= List of Dad's Army episodes =

Dad's Army is a British television sitcom about the United Kingdom's Home Guard during the Second World War, produced by David Croft, and written by Jimmy Perry and David Croft. Set in the fictional seaside town of Walmington-on-Sea, located near Eastbourne, it follows a well-meaning platoon of men ineligible for active service as they serve as Britain's "last line of defence". The series was broadcast on BBC1 from 31 July 1968 to 13 November 1977; a total of 80 episodes, spread over nine series, including three Christmas specials and three missing episodes, were produced. Four short Christmas sketches were also broadcast as part of Christmas Night with the Stars.

The first two series were broadcast in black-and-white, from 31 July 1968 to 5 April 1969, and the next seven series were produced in colour and broadcast from 11 September 1969 to 13 November 1977. Episodes ran for 30 minutes each, with some exceptions: the 1971 Christmas special "Battle of the Giants!" aired on 27 December 1971 and ran for 60 minutes; the 1975 Christmas special "My Brother and I" aired on 26 December 1975 and ran for 40 minutes; and the final episode of series nine, "Never Too Old", aired on 13 November 1977, with a duration of 35 minutes.

Five episodes of series two were not retained by the BBC Archives, but two of those episodes, "Operation Kilt" and "The Battle of Godfrey's Cottage", were located in 2001. An audio recording of "A Stripe for Frazer", one of the three missing episodes, was discovered in 2008 and an animated version of it was released in February 2016. An episode of series three, "Room at the Bottom", was broadcast in colour but only a black-and-white copy survives in the archives. The episode was restored in 2008 using colour recovery.

All interior studio scenes for the nine series, the Christmas specials and the Christmas Night with the Stars specials were recorded in the BBC Television Centre in West London, where the production used many of the eight main television studios there, to record the show.

Many exterior scenes were filmed in a studio, but when location recordings were made, they were completed in Norfolk, with the production team basing themselves in the small Norfolk town of Thetford.

Every Dad's Army episode included the following main cast members: Arthur Lowe (Captain George Mainwaring), John Le Mesurier (Sergeant Arthur Wilson), Clive Dunn (Lance Corporal Jack Jones), John Laurie (Private James Frazer), Arnold Ridley (Private Charles Godfrey) and Ian Lavender (Private Frank Pike). These cast members appeared in all 80 episodes of the series, ranging from "The Man and the Hour" in 1968 to "Never Too Old" in 1977, while James Beck (Private Joe Walker) appeared in 59 episodes, leading up to his sudden death in 1973, ranging from "The Man and the Hour" in 1968 to "Things that Go Bump in the Night" in 1973. Following the deaths of every Dad’s Army cast member starting from James Beck in 1973 to Ian Lavender in 2024, there are now no surviving main cast members of Dad's Army.

== Cast timeline ==
| Character | Actor | Duration | Episodes | Rank |
|---|---|---|---|---|
| George Mainwaring | Arthur Lowe | 1968-1977 | 80 | Captain |
| Arthur Wilson | John Le Mesurier | 1968-1977 | 80 | Sergeant |
| Jack Jones | Clive Dunn | 1968-1977 | 80 | Lance Corporal |
| James Frazer | John Laurie | 1968-1977 | 80 | Private |
| Charles Godfrey | Arnold Ridley | 1968-1977 | 80 | Private |
| Frank Pike | Ian Lavender | 1968-1977 | 80 | Private |
| Joe Walker | James Beck | 1968-1973 | 59 | Private |

== Series overview ==
| Series | Episodes | Originally released | | Average viewers (millions) |
| Series | Episodes | First released | Last released | Average viewers (millions) |
|---|---|---|---|---|
| 1 | 6 | 31 July 1968 | 11 September 1968 | 8.2 |
| 2 | 6 | 1 March 1969 | 5 April 1969 | 12.2 |
| 3 | 14 | 11 September 1969 | 11 December 1969 | 12.1 |
| 4 | 13 | 25 September 1970 | 18 December 1970 | 14.4 |
| Christmas | 1 | 27 December 1971 | | 18.7 |
| 5 | 13 | 6 October 1972 | 29 December 1972 | 16.3 |
| 6 | 7 | 31 October 1973 | 12 December 1973 | 12.3 |
| 7 | 6 | 15 November 1974 | 23 December 1974 | 14.8 |
| 8 | 6 | 5 September 1975 | 10 October 1975 | 13.5 |
| Christmas | 2 | 26 December 1975 | 26 December 1976 | 13.65 |
| 9 | 6 | 2 October 1977 | 13 November 1977 | 10.5 |

== Episodes ==
Of the 80 episodes and four short sketches produced from 1968 to 1977, the first twelve episodes (Series 1 and Series 2) and one sketch in 1968 were filmed in black and white. From Series 3 to Series 9, all episodes were filmed in colour (the first ten episodes of Series 3 were first aired in black and white).

=== Series 1 (1968) ===
| No. overall | No. in series | Title | Recorded date | Original release date | U.K. viewers (millions) |
|---|---|---|---|---|---|
| 1 | 1 | "The Man and the Hour" | 15 April 1968 | 31 July 1968 | 7.2 |
After hearing of the formation of the Home Guard, George Mainwaring, a bank manager, takes it upon himself to form a platoon in Walmington-on-Sea. He declares himself captain, an assumption others are not so keen to make. He names his chief clerk, Arthur Wilson, sergeant. They enrol some of the townsfolk for the Local Defence Volunteers, although most are unfit and/or over the age limit of 65 years, and almost no supplies are available. Note: First appearances of Arthur Lowe as Captain George Mainwaring, John Le Mesurier as Sergeant Arthur Wilson, Clive Dunn as Lance Corporal Jack Jones, John Laurie as Private James Frazer, Arnold Ridley as Private Charles Godfrey, Ian Lavender as Private Frank Pike and James Beck as Private Joe Walker.
| 2 | 2 | "Museum Piece" | 22 April 1968 | 7 August 1968 | 6.8 |
Mainwaring, worried that the Nazis could attack at any time, attempts to requisition much-needed weapons from the local Peabody Museum of Historic Army Weapons.
| 3 | 3 | "Command Decision" | 29 April 1968 | 14 August 1968 | 8.6 |
In exchange for weapons, Mainwaring hands over command to Colonel Square, but the weapons are muskets and Square wants the platoon to fight on horseback.
| 4 | 4 | "The Enemy Within the Gates" | 6 May 1968 | 28 August 1968^{a} | 8.1 |
Lance Corporal Jones and Private Walker capture two Luftwaffe airmen, earning a monetary reward; however, a Polish officer wishes to claim the reward for himself.
| 5 | 5 | "The Showing Up of Corporal Jones" | 13 May 1968 | 4 September 1968^{b} | 8.8 |
Major Regan from area headquarters decides that Jones is too old to be in the Home Guard, and announces that unless Jones can complete the assault course in fifteen minutes, he will be removed from the platoon.
| 6 | 6 | "Shooting Pains" | 20 May 1968 | 11 September 1968^{c} | 9.7 |
The platoon is chosen to provide the guard of honour for the Prime Minister on his visit to Walmington-on-Sea, but poor performance at the shooting range causes Major Regan to have them compete with the neighbouring Eastgate platoon for the honour.
| - | - | "Santa on Patrol^{d}^{‡}" | 27 October 1968 | 25 December 1968 | N/A |
Mainwaring orders the platoon to parade as usual on Christmas Day. Broadcast as part of Christmas Night with the Stars.

^a This episode was planned for transmission on 21 August 1968. However, the BBC replaced it with a documentary on the Hungarian uprising, due to the Warsaw Pact invasion of Czechoslovakia.

^b This episode was planned for transmission on 28 August 1968, but was replaced by "The Enemy Within the Gates", which was postponed from last Wednesday.

^c This episode was planned for transmission on 4 September 1968, but was replaced by "The Showing Up of Corporal Jones", which was postponed from last Wednesday.

^d This 10-minute sketch is officially untitled, but is generally referred to as "Santa on Patrol"; however, when the sketch was animated in 2023, it was known by the title "Poles Apart".

Episodes in italics are missing
^‡ Episode reconstructed using animation and original soundtrack

=== Series 2 (1969) ===
| No. overall | No. in series | Title | Recorded date | Original release date | U.K. viewers (millions) |
|---|---|---|---|---|---|
| 7 | 1 | "Operation Kilt" | 13 October 1968 | 1 March 1969^{b} | 13.9 |
The platoon participates in an invasion exercise with Captain Ogilvie and a Highland regiment.
| 8 | 2 | "The Battle of Godfrey's Cottage" | 20 October 1968 | 8 March 1969 | 11.3 |
The platoon mistakenly believes an invasion is in progress, and splits into two sections. One section, though, mistakes the other for the enemy.
| 9 | 3 | "The Loneliness of the Long Distance Walker"^{†}^{‡} | 27 October 1968 | 15 March 1969 | 11.3 |
Walker is called up into the army. The platoon, anxious at how they will obtain off-the-ration supplies without him, fight to keep him. Note: This is the first missing episode.
| 10 | 4 | "Sgt. Wilson's Little Secret" | 4 November 1968 | 22 March 1969 | 13.6 |
Private Pike's mother agrees to take in a child evacuee, but Wilson misunderstands her and believes she is pregnant. Mainwaring orders Wilson to marry her.
| 11 | 5 | "A Stripe for Frazer"^{†}^{‡} | 15 November 1968 | 29 March 1969 | 11.3 |
Mainwaring has the opportunity to promote someone to corporal. Rather than promote Jones, he tests who has the greatest potential by temporarily promoting Private Frazer to lance corporal. Frazer's increasingly dictatorial manner soon alienates the platoon.
| 12 | 6 | "Under Fire"^{†}^{‡} | 27 November 1968 | 5 April 1969 | 11.6 |
When Frazer spots what he believes to be a German spy who is in the act of signalling to planes, the platoon arrests a suspect who protests that he is a naturalised Englishman. Note: This was the last episode to be produced in black and white.

^A The series was scheduled originally to be broadcast in January 1969. Instead, the BBC decided to repeat the first series in January 1969 because they believed many people had missed the series when it had started in the summer of 1968.

Episodes in italics are missing

^† Episode remade using new cast in 2019

^‡ Episode reconstructed using animation and original soundtrack

=== Series 3 (1969) ===
| No. overall | No. in series | Title | Recorded date | Original release date | U.K. viewers (millions) |
|---|---|---|---|---|---|
| 13 | 1 | "The Armoured Might of Lance Corporal Jones" | 25 May 1969 | 11 September 1969 | 10.5 |
Jones donates his van as a troop transport, but Walker wants to use it for his black market activities. Both men are sent with the van to work with Air Raid Precautions during an exercise. Note: This was the first episode to be produced and transmitted in colour, but the full colour television service on BBC One did not commence until Saturday 15 November 1969.
| 14 | 2 | "Battle School" | 1 June 1969 | 18 September 1969 | 11.4 |
The platoon is selected to attend a weekend camp run by a tough Spanish captain.
| 15 | 3 | "The Lion Has Phones" | 8 June 1969 | 25 September 1969 | 11.3 |
Mainwaring teaches the men to use the public telephone system as emergency communication. Jones and Hodges attempt to phone general headquarters when a German aeroplane crashes in the reservoir.
| 16 | 4 | "The Bullet is Not for Firing" | 22 June 1969 | 2 October 1969 | 11.8 |
The platoon's supply of ammunition is used up when engaging a low-flying German plane, and Mainwaring sets up a court of inquiry to determine who should be held responsible. The inquiry descends into farce when the platoon attempts to re-enact the event.
| 17 | 5 | "Something Nasty in the Vault" | 15 June 1969 | 9 October 1969 | 11.1 |
The bank takes a direct hit during an air-raid, but the bomb fails to explode, leaving Mainwaring and Wilson stuck in the vault with it. When the bomb disposal officer leaves to collect the right tools, the platoon members take matters into their own hands.
| 18 | 6 | "Room at the Bottom" | 29 June 1969 | 16 October 1969 | 12.4 |
General headquarters discovers that Mainwaring has never held a commission; he is demoted to private. Mainwaring however accepts and continues in the platoon proudly as private. Wilson now leads the platoon, but with little success; at the request of the members of the platoon Mainwaring is reinstated as captain.
| 19 | 7 | "Big Guns" | 6 July 1969 | 23 October 1969 | 13.2 |
The platoon is given a heavy naval artillery piece but the town's bandstand, a rare example of Victorian ironwork, stands in its field of fire. The town council insists it must be preserved but Mainwaring reasons that a demonstration of the gun's capabilities will quiet any protests.
| 20 | 8 | "The Day the Balloon Went Up" | 23 October 1969 | 30 October 1969 | 12.5 |
A runaway barrage balloon must be retrieved. After a series of mistakes, Mainwaring is dragged through the countryside by one of the balloon's cables.
| 21 | 9 | "War Dance" | 30 October 1969 | 6 November 1969 | 12.6 |
Mainwaring announces that a dance will be held to raise morale. He is less than pleased when Pike announces that his date for the evening will be the daughter of Mainwaring's cleaning woman.
| 22 | 10 | "Menace from the Deep" | 7 November 1969 | 13 November 1969 | 13.3 |
The platoon is placed on guard duty, and mans a machine gun post at the end of the pier. When Pike loses the food and the boat, morale begins to fall. The situation worsens when they spot a drifting sea mine.
| 23 | 11 | "Branded" | 14 November 1969 | 20 November 1969 | 11.1 |
When Private Godfrey admits to having been a conscientious objector during the Great War, he is branded a coward, sent home in disgrace and thereafter ostracised by the platoon. When he saves Mainwaring's life, though, and it emerges that he holds the Military Medal for bravery under fire as a medical orderly, he is forgiven and reinstated. Note: This was the very first colour episode of Dad's Army to officially air in colour, for the BBC One colour television service commenced transmission on Saturday 15 November 1969 (Colour tests, which included earlier episodes of series 3, had been taking place for some weeks).
| 24 | 12 | "Man Hunt" | 21 November 1969 | 27 November 1969 | 11.8 |
Mainwaring uses Walker's new tracking dog to locate a discarded parachute. After finding dozens of ladies' undergarments made from the parachute's silk, an enemy airman is finally cornered.
| 25 | 13 | "No Spring for Frazer" | 28 November 1969 | 4 December 1969 | 13.6 |
Frazer the undertaker loses the spring of the Lewis gun. He believes it may be in a recently-made coffin which is shortly to be buried.
| 26 | 14 | "Sons of the Sea" | 5 December 1969 | 11 December 1969 | 13.3 |
The platoon requisitions a boat and sets off to guard the local river. After getting lost in what they think is the English Channel, they believe themselves to be stranded behind enemy lines.
| - | - | "Resisting the Aggressor Down the Ages" | 21 November 1969 | 25 December 1969 | N/A |
The platoon are rehearsing their performance for the upcoming pageant to raise money for "War Weapons Week". Broadcast as part of Christmas Night with the Stars.

=== Series 4 (1970) ===
| No. overall | No. in series | Title | Recorded date | Original release date | U.K. viewers (millions) |
|---|---|---|---|---|---|
| 27 | 1 | "The Big Parade" | 17 July 1970 | 25 September 1970 | 14 |
The platoon joins the Spitfire Week parade, but has to compete with the Sea Scouts and the ARP wardens for pole position. Mainwaring thinks a mascot will help their chances. Note: The platoon have ceased using the original "Denim overalls, 1939 pattern" uniforms that they had worn since "The Showing Up of Corporal Jones", and are now wearing Battledress uniforms made of wool serge. This includes the first use of the "CP1" formation badge on the tunic arm.
| 28 | 2 | "Don't Forget the Diver" | 24 July 1970 | 2 October 1970 | 12.3 |
The platoon takes part in an exercise with Captain Square's men. Square's men will defend a windmill and the platoon must plant a dummy bomb inside. The platoon devises a plan which involves putting Jones in a fake tree trunk and pushing him up the river.
| 29 | 3 | "Boots, Boots, Boots" | 31 July 1970 | 9 October 1970 | 13.2 |
Mainwaring puts the platoon on a foot-toughening regime, including 20 miles (32 km) route marches and playing football in bare feet.
| 30 | 4 | "Sgt – Save My Boy!" | 27 June 1970 | 16 October 1970 | 14.5 |
Pike is caught in barbed wire in the middle of a mine field on the beach. The army engineers are slow to arrive so the platoon takes action to save him.
| 31 | 5 | "Don't Fence Me In" | 10 July 1970 | 23 October 1970 | 16.4 |
The platoon is sent to guard a camp full of Italian prisoners of war, but Walker's attitude toward them makes Mainwaring wonder if he is a fifth columnist.
| 32 | 6 | "Absent Friends" | 7 August 1970 | 30 October 1970 | 13.9 |
In Mainwaring's absence, the platoon foregoes parade to compete in a darts match against the ARP wardens. Upon his return, Mainwaring orders Wilson to bring them back. With two pints for the winners, though, the platoon refuses to leave.
| 33 | 7 | "Put That Light Out!" | 30 October 1970 | 6 November 1970 | 13 |
The platoon mans a local lighthouse as defence against a seaborne assault. During an air raid, the light is switched on and the town is illuminated.
| 34 | 8 | "The Two and a Half Feathers" | 6 November 1970 | 13 November 1970 | 15.6 |
A new platoon member who served with Jones during the Mahdist War accuses him of cowardice.
| 35 | 9 | "Mum's Army" | 13 November 1970 | 20 November 1970 | 16.4 |
Mainwaring allows women into his platoon but rumours begin to circulate that he has become personally involved with one of the new members.
| 36 | 10 | "The Test" | 20 November 1970 | 27 November 1970 | 16 |
The ARP wardens challenge the Home Guard to a game of cricket. While Mainwaring is happy to play fairly, Hodges recruits Ernie Egan, a professional cricketeer.
| 37 | 11 | "A. Wilson (Manager)?" | 27 November 1970 | 4 December 1970 | 15.4 |
Mainwaring is shocked to discover that Wilson has been both made manager of the Eastgate branch of the bank and commissioned as 2nd Lieutenant of the Eastgate platoon. Mainwaring is left with Pike as his chief clerk and Jones as his sergeant.
| 38 | 12 | "Uninvited Guests" | 4 December 1970 | 11 December 1970 | 13.1 |
After the ARP headquarters is bombed, the platoon is forced to share the church hall with the wardens.
| 39 | 13 | "Fallen Idol" | 11 December 1970 | 18 December 1970 | 13.1 |
Captain Square gets Mainwaring drunk in the officers' mess, damaging Mainwaring's reputation in the eyes of the platoon. Mainwaring must repair his image.
| - | - | "Cornish Floral Dance^{‡}" | 4 December 1970 | 25 December 1970 | N/A |
The platoon have joined forces with the ARP warden and the local WRVS to form a choir for an upcoming Christmas concert. Broadcast as part of Christmas Night with the Stars.

Episodes in italics are missing
^‡ Episode reconstructed using animation and original soundtrack

=== Christmas Special (1971) ===
| No. | Title | Recorded date | Original release date | U.K. viewers (millions) |
|---|---|---|---|---|
| 40 | "Battle of the Giants!" | 19 October 1971 | 27 December 1971 | 18.7 |
The platoon is challenged to a test by the Eastgate platoon, with Hodges, the vicar and the verger as judges. They seem unlikely to win and their chances worsen when Jones has a bout of malaria.

=== Series 5 (1972) ===
| No. overall | No. in series | Title | Recorded date | Original release date | U.K. viewers (millions) |
|---|---|---|---|---|---|
| 41 | 1 | "Asleep in the Deep" | 26 May 1972 | 6 October 1972 | 17 |
Godfrey and Walker are trapped when a bomb falls on the local pumping station. When Hodges and the others try to free them, they all become trapped. A pipe bursts and the room begins rapidly filling with water. Jones, trapped in the other room, tries desperately to turn the water off.
| 42 | 2 | "Keep Young and Beautiful" | 9 June 1972 | 13 October 1972 | 16 |
When GHQ announce swapping members of the home guard and the ARP, Jones, Godfrey and Frazer use Frazer's embalming equipment to make themselves look younger to avoid transfer to the ARP. Walker tricks Hodges into dying his hair with ceiling paint, with Hodges believing the 'dye' will make him look old enough to stay in the ARP.
| 43 | 3 | "A Soldier's Farewell" | 2 June 1972 | 20 October 1972 | 17.7 |
Mainwaring, unhappy because his men are not living up to his expectations, and believing his leadership to be unappreciated, dreams he is Napoleon after eating too much toasted cheese.
| 44 | 4 | "Getting the Bird" | 19 May 1972 | 27 October 1972 | 17.5 |
Wilson goes AWOL and is seen with his arm round a younger woman, who turns out be his daughter. Walker acquires 250 pigeons for Jones to sell as off-the-ration meat. When Jones then hears of an unexplained shortage of pigeons in Trafalgar Square, he changes his mind.
| 45 | 5 | "The Desperate Drive of Corporal Jones" | 16 June 1972 | 3 November 1972 | 15.8 |
The platoon is to guard a barn near another that is the target for artillery practice and after a mix-up over map coordinates end up in the wrong one. Jones cannot phone a correction from HQ due to Godfrey cutting the wire by mistake. With the van broken, Jones and Godfrey must drive two cars there; as Godfrey cannot drive, Jones tows his car along.
| 46 | 6 | "If the Cap Fits..." | 30 June 1972 | 10 November 1972 | 15.5 |
After Frazer complains that Mainwaring is wasting his time with irrelevant lectures, Mainwaring allows Frazer to act as captain for a couple of days. Frazer begins abusing his power by firing Wilson, insulting Jones (resulting in Jones's resignation), and promoting Walker and Pike. A Scottish general asks the 'captain' to play the bagpipes, but Mainwaring has a hidden talent.
| 47 | 7 | "The King Was in His Counting House" | 23 June 1972 | 17 November 1972 | 16 |
To boost morale, Mainwaring holds a party in his home. A bomb hits the bank during the party; thousands of pounds must be counted and guarded by the party guests, then taken to the Eastgate branch by horse-and-cart. Pike scares the horse, and it bolts – with Mainwaring on board.
| 48 | 8 | "All is Safely Gathered In" | 3 November 1972 | 24 November 1972 | 16.5 |
Private Godfrey requests leave in order to help his widowed friend Mrs Prentice gather the harvest – and Mainwaring, citing the harvest as vital to the war effort, offers the assistance of the platoon. Hodges wants to turn over a new leaf, and comes to help as well. Jones loses his trousers in the threshing machine and the platoon get drunk on Mrs Prentice's homemade wine, after which they fight with an equally drunk Hodges during the vicar's harvest blessing.
| 49 | 9 | "When Did You Last See Your Money?" | 10 November 1972 | 1 December 1972 | 16 |
When Jones arrives at the bank to deposit £500 from local shopkeepers for the servicemen's canteen, he realises his packet contains half a pound of sausages instead of the money.
| 50 | 10 | "Brain Versus Brawn" | 17 November 1972 | 8 December 1972 | 18.6 |
The platoon is challenged to plant a dummy bomb in the officer commanding's office. They disguise themselves as firemen travelling in an old fire engine, but Hodges spots a real fire. Wilson and Walker then reveal their contingency plan.
| 51 | 11 | "A Brush with the Law" | 26 November 1972 | 15 December 1972 | 15.4 |
Mainwaring is charged with showing a light and is taken to court by a gleeful Hodges. When Mr Yeatman tries to admit his responsibility to Hodges, he is blackmailed into remaining silent. Walker then blackmails the judge, Captain Square, into freeing Mainwaring due to Walker observing the light being switched on at the time he brought Square some illegal whiskey. Mr Yeatman then admits in court that he had switched on the light.
| 52 | 12 | "Round and Round Went the Great Big Wheel" | 1 December 1972 | 22 December 1972 | 13.7 |
Operation Catherine Wheel is the testing of the War Office's new, radio-controlled explosive wheel. The platoon is chosen for fatigues, but Pike and Walker sneak off to listen to the radio; unbeknownst to them, the radio waves push the wheel out of control. (This episode appears to be loosely based on the Department of Miscellaneous Weapons Development project The Great Panjandrum.)
| - | - | "Broadcast to the Empire" | 26 November 1972 | 25 December 1972 | N/A |
The platoon have been chosen to take part in a BBC Radio programme to be broadcast just prior to the King's Christmas message. Broadcast as part of Christmas Night with the Stars.
| 53 | 13 | "Time On My Hands" | 8 December 1972 | 29 December 1972 | 16.6 |
An enemy pilot has bailed out and is trapped on the town hall clock. The platoon climbs up the precarious ladder to reach him, but getting down becomes more difficult when Jones breaks the ladder. After bringing the terrified German pilot to safety, the vicar comes to the platoon's rescue.

=== Series 6 (1973) ===
| No. overall | No. in series | Title | Recorded date | Original release date | U.K. viewers (millions) |
|---|---|---|---|---|---|
| 54 | 1 | "The Deadly Attachment" | 22 June 1973 | 31 October 1973 | 12.9 |
The platoon is ordered to guard the crew of a sunken U-boat until the escort arrives. The escort is delayed, though, and the platoon must guard the crew all night.
| 55 | 2 | "My British Buddy" | 8 June 1973 | 7 November 1973 | 12.5 |
A group of American soldiers arrives at Walmington-on-Sea, but their presence is unappreciated when they begin flirting with the platoon's girlfriends.
| 56 | 3 | "The Royal Train" | 29 June 1973 | 14 November 1973 | 13.1 |
The platoon will provide a guard of honour for George VI as he passes through Walmington-on-Sea. A mix-up stops another train in the station, though, blocking the King's route.
| 57 | 4 | "We Know Our Onions" | 15 June 1973 | 21 November 1973 | 11.6 |
The platoon takes an efficiency test that will promote the platoon to twelve stars if successful. The Warden and Verger try and steal their onions from the platoon.
| 58 | 5 | "The Honourable Man" | 8 July 1973 | 28 November 1973 | 12.1 |
Wilson inherits a title and consequently receives an invitation to become a member of the golf club that Mainwaring has been trying to join for years.
| 59 | 6 | "Things That Go Bump in the Night" | 15 July 1973 | 5 December 1973 | 12.2 |
The platoon runs out of petrol and spends the night in a deserted – and apparently haunted – house. Note: Last regular appearance of James Beck as Private Joe Walker. Walker only appears in the external scenes as Beck was taken ill shortly before the studio scenes were recorded.
| 60 | 7 | "The Recruit" | 22 July 1973 | 12 December 1973 | 11.5 |
When Mainwaring takes leave due to an ingrown toenail, Wilson takes charge. He angers the rest of the platoon, though, by allowing the vicar and Mr Yeatman to join. Note: This is the first episode not to feature James Beck as Private Joe Walker, although Beck is still included in the closing credits.

=== Series 7 (1974) ===
| No. overall | No. in series | Title | Recorded date | Original release date | U.K. viewers (millions) |
|---|---|---|---|---|---|
| 61 | 1 | "Everybody's Trucking" | 27 October 1974 | 15 November 1974 | 14.1 |
The platoon is given the job of signposting the area for an Army exercise, but a steam engine is blocking the route. When Jones tries to drive round it, his van becomes stuck, blocking both Hodges in his van and Mr Farthing with his bus of pensioners. Note: This is the first series not to feature James Beck as Private Joe Walker, following his death the previous year.
| 62 | 2 | "A Man of Action" | 7 May 1974 | 22 November 1974 | 16.4 |
A landmine has destroyed 100 yards (92 m) of railway track, along with the water and gas mains, and the telephone line. Compounding the problem, Pike gets his head stuck between the bars of a gate. Mainwaring declares martial law.
| 63 | 3 | "Gorilla Warfare" | 27 October 1974 | 29 November 1974 | 14.4 |
On a field exercise acting as commandos meeting a secret agent (represented by Mainwaring), the platoon must trust no one for GHQ has sent out counter agents to catch them. The appearance of a gorilla compounds their problem.
| 64 | 4 | "The Godiva Affair" | 3 November 1974 | 6 December 1974 | 13.8 |
The platoon dresses up as morris dancers as part of a carnival to raise money for the town's Spitfire fund, which is still £2,000 short. A Lady Godiva figure will lead the parade but there is confusion over who this will be.
| 65 | 5 | "The Captain's Car" | 17 November 1974 | 13 December 1974 | 14.4 |
Lady Maltby donates her Rolls-Royce for use as a staff car. Wilson and Pike are assigned to paint it for camouflage, but instead Jones mistakenly paints the Mayor's Rolls-Royce, just before a French general is due to visit the town.
| 66 | 6 | "Turkey Dinner" | 10 December 1974 | 23 December 1974 | 15.8 |
After Jones mistakenly shoots a turkey on patrol and its owner cannot be found, the platoon decides to hold a turkey dinner and treat the town's senior citizens.

=== Series 8 (1975) ===
| No. overall | No. in series | Title | Recorded date | Original release date | U.K. viewers (millions) |
|---|---|---|---|---|---|
| 67 | 1 | "Ring Dem Bells" | 3 July 1975 | 5 September 1975 | 11.3 |
The platoon is chosen to play Germans in a training film. After arriving on the set a week early, they are mistaken for real Germans on the way home.
| 68 | 2 | "When You've Got to Go" | 6 June 1975 | 12 September 1975 | 12.6 |
Despite his bad chest, blocked sinuses, weak ankles and a recently acquired facial tic, Pike passes the medical exam and is set to join the Royal Air Force.
| 69 | 3 | "Is There Honey Still for Tea?" | 26 June 1975 | 19 September 1975 | 12.8 |
Godfrey's cottage is under threat from the building of a new aerodrome, but Frazer blackmails the minister in charge to save it.
| 70 | 4 | "Come In, Your Time Is Up" | 10 July 1975 | 26 September 1975 | 14.6 |
The platoon goes camping and discovers three German airmen in a dinghy on the reservoir. Pike wants to shoot through the dinghy and sink them, but Mainwaring dismisses this as unfair. Wilson must devise a more civilised strategy.
| 71 | 5 | "High Finance" | 30 May 1975 | 3 October 1975 | 14.3 |
Mainwaring stops Jones from cashing any more cheques because his bank balance is in the red. An investigation reveals an increasing train of debtors, leading back through an orphanage, to which Jones has been supplying meat, to Hodges.
| 72 | 6 | "The Face on the Poster" | 17 July 1975 | 10 October 1975 | 15.5 |
Mainwaring prepares a poster for a recruitment drive, eager to increase his platoon to a company and so gain promotion to Major. A mix-up at the printer, though, lands the platoon in trouble and Jones, the face of the recruitment drive, in a prisoner of war camp.

=== Christmas Specials (1975–1976) ===
| No. | Title | Recorded date | Original release date | U.K. viewers (millions) |
|---|---|---|---|---|
| 73 | "My Brother and I" | 23 May 1975 | 26 December 1975 | 13.6 |
Mainwaring's drunken brother Barry arrives in Walmington-on-Sea claiming that their father's pocket watch, held by Mainwaring, belongs to him. Mainwaring gives him the pocket watch to assuage him, but Barry gatecrashes Mainwaring's party for local dignitaries.
| 74 | "The Love of Three Oranges" | 10 October 1976 | 26 December 1976 | 13.7 |
To raise money for the Comforts for the Troops Fund, the vicar organises a bazaar to which each member of the platoon donates something. Hodges, the greengrocer, donates three oranges, rare due to wartime rationing. Mainwaring is determined to buy one of the oranges for his wife.
| - | "Cornish Floral Dance" | 16 October 1975 | 16 October 1975 | N/A |
The sketch from 1970 was restaged for the Royal Variety Performance of 1975.

=== Series 9 (1977) ===
| No. overall | No. in series | Title | Recorded date | Original release date | U.K. viewers (millions) |
|---|---|---|---|---|---|
| 75 | 1 | "Wake Up Walmington" | 8 July 1977 | 2 October 1977 | 10.2 |
As the threat of invasion lessens, the towns people become lax. Mainwaring orders Operation Wake-Up, dressing up the platoon members as fifth columnists and telling them to act suspiciously. Eventually, the Eastgate platoon is called in to deal with them.
| 76 | 2 | "The Making of Private Pike" | 1 July 1977 | 9 October 1977 | 10.3 |
Pike borrows Mainwaring's recently acquired staff car to drive his new girlfriend to Eastgate, but it runs out of petrol on the way home, forcing Pike to spend all night pushing it back.
| 77 | 3 | "Knights of Madness" | 22 July 1977 | 16 October 1977 | 10 |
As part of a Wings for Victory Week, the platoon decides to stage a reenactment of the battle between Saint George and the Dragon. The ARP wardens, though, have been planning the same thing.
| 78 | 4 | "The Miser's Hoard" | 24 June 1977 | 23 October 1977 | 11.1 |
Frazer, distrustful of banks, keeps his savings in the form of gold sovereigns, but Mainwaring believes his hoard would be better in the bank. Rumours spread about the savings and when Frazer is seen carrying a box to the graveyard, the platoon follows.
| 79 | 5 | "Number Engaged" | 15 July 1977 | 6 November 1977 | 9.6 |
The platoon is given the job of guarding telephone lines. Mainwaring spots an unexploded bomb caught in the wires.
| 80 | 6 | "Never Too Old" | 29 July 1977 | 13 November 1977 | 12.5 |
Jones marries Mrs Fox but the party after the service is interrupted when an invasion warning is sounded. In the end, Wilson and Mainwaring agree that the platoon are to raise their glasses for a toast-raising ceremony to say in unison "To Britain's Home Guard!" Notes: Screened on Remembrance Sunday 1977. Last appearances of Arthur Lowe as Captain George Mainwaring, John Le Mesurier as Sergeant Arthur Wilson, Clive Dunn as Lance Corporal Jack Jones, John Laurie as Private James Frazer, Arnold Ridley as Private Charles Godfrey and Ian Lavender as Private Frank Pike.

== Sketches and short films ==
Christmas Night with the Stars, broadcast annually on BBC1 on Christmas Day, included sketches from Dad's Army in four years:

- "Untitled Christmas Short" in 1968
- "Resisting the Aggressor Down the Ages" in 1969
- "Cornish Floral Dance" in 1970
- "Broadcast to the Empire" in 1972.

The 1968 sketch was broadcast in black and white, and the others were broadcast in colour. The 1968 and 1970 sketches are lost from the BBC Archives but survive as audio recordings. The 1968 sketch ran for nine minutes. The 1969 sketch ran for ten minutes, whilst the 1970 and 1972 sketches ran for fifteen minutes each.

The "Cornish Floral Dance" was again performed for the Royal Variety Performance of 1975. This version is extant and can be found online.

In 1974 and 1977, the cast of Dad's Army appeared in-character for public information films commissioned by the Central Office of Information to instruct viewers how to successfully use pelican crossings.
