= Santa on Patrol =

- Dad's Army episode
- Directed by: David Croft
- Story by: Jimmy Perry and David Croft
- Original air date: 25 December 1968
- Running time: 10 mins

Episode chronology
← Previous —	Next → "Resisting the Aggressor Down the Ages"

"Santa on Patrol" is the first Christmas Night with the Stars sketch from the British comedy series Dad's Army. It was originally transmitted on Christmas Day (25 December) 1968. Although audio recordings of the sketch exist, it is not otherwise known to have survived (See Wiping).

This short (less than 10 minutes long) episode was never given any kind of episode title. All surviving paperwork of the time confirms that it was only ever officially designated as a Dad's Army segment for the BBC's Christmas Night with the Stars strand. In recent years the title "Santa on Patrol" has become attached to the story. This happened quite by accident. When the story was being lined up for an audio CD release, a producer at BBC Audiobooks called Charles Norton, invented the title, as it saved confusion on internal paperwork. Somehow this title was later accidentally given out to online retailers and has been mistakenly taken as a real title, although it is entirely unofficial. Outside of some online listings, the title is not used in any book or on any BBC DVD, video or CD release. The title was coined in 2014 in an internal BBC email and was never intended to become public.

== Plot ==
Although it is Christmas Day 1940, Captain Mainwaring is unable to forget his sense of duty and orders his men to parade as normal. Sergeant Wilson, being more relaxed about the festive affair, says they can wear civvies. Mainwaring does not like the sergeant's sudden burst of decision making and subsequently, the men arrive at the parade all dressed as Father Christmas, with various reasons why. Mainwaring views this as proof that you cannot be seen to let discipline drop for one moment.

GHQ have come up with an idea of using telegraph poles as a means of exercise and Mainwaring runs through the instructions with his men and as usual, forgets the age of some of them, especially when he shouts 'jump' to the aged Private Godfrey and expects him to sit cross-legged on the floor. Eventually Mainwaring has to show them how it's done, but everyone is saved by the bell as the Major phones through to the office with his seasonal greetings.

Mainwaring returns to the hall and delivers a speech which shows how confident he is regarding the outcome of the war. In return, the men show their respect and affection for him as they wish him and each other a Merry Christmas.

== Cast ==
- Arthur Lowe as Captain Mainwaring
- John Le Mesurier as Sergeant Wilson
- Clive Dunn as Lance Corporal Jones
- John Laurie as Private Frazer
- James Beck as Private Walker
- Arnold Ridley as Private Godfrey
- Ian Lavender as Private Pike
- Edward Sinclair as The Verger

== Notes ==
1. This sketch is sometimes referred to as "Present Arms", although confusingly that is the name of a Dad's Army radio episode (number 021) which has a completely different plot.
2. This episode no longer exists in television video archives, most likely due to the re-use of the then expensive videotape. However, a domestic audio recording of this special was discovered and can be heard on the Dad's Army: The Lost Tapes CD.
3. First appearance of The Verger who would appear in Series 2.
4. This was recorded on the same day as the lost series 2 episode "The Loneliness of the Long Distance Walker".
5. In 2023, an animated version of this was broadcast alongside "Cornish Floral Dance" as one of a series of animated recreations of all of the missing episodes
