= Dad's Army (stage show) =

1975 sitcom "Dad's Army"

Dad's Army: A Nostalgic Music and Laughter Show of Britain's Finest Hour
- A poster advertising the stage show.
- Original language: English
- Written by: Jimmy Perry; David Croft
- Based on: Dad's Army
- Subject: Wartime
- Genre: Revue
- Setting: Walmington-on-Sea, 1940s

Premiere
- Date: 4 September 1975
- Place: Forum Theatre, Billingham
- Directed by: Roger Redfarn

Dad's Army: A Nostalgic Music and Laughter Show of Britain's Finest Hour was a 1975 stage adaptation of the BBC sitcom Dad's Army. Following the success of the television programme, the stage show was commissioned by Bernard Delfont in the spring of 1975.

Jimmy Perry and David Croft adapted material from the original scripts, making changes to allow for the absence of location filming. The show was in the style of a revue, with songs, familiar scenes from the show, and individual turns for cast members. It was directed by Roger Redfarn, who shared the same agent as the writers.

== Cast ==
Character	Original television series	West End 1975	2007 tour
Captain Mainwaring	Arthur Lowe	Arthur Lowe	Peter Martin; Tim Knightley (halfway)
Sergeant Wilson	John Le Mesurier	John Le Mesurier	David Warwick
Lance Corporal Jones	Clive Dunn	Clive Dunn	Richard Tate
Private Walker	James Beck	John Bardon	Leslie Grantham
Private Pike	Ian Lavender	Ian Lavender	Tom Richardson
Private Frazer	John Laurie	Hamish Roughead	
Private Godfrey	Arnold Ridley	Arnold Ridley	
Private Maple		Norman Macleod	
Private Meadow		Graham Hamilton	

Jeffrey Holland, who would frequently collaborate with Croft in the future, portrayed multiple roles, as did actor Ronnie Grainge, who as well as singing and dancing in all the musical numbers, also played an RAF officer and German General.

== Dates ==
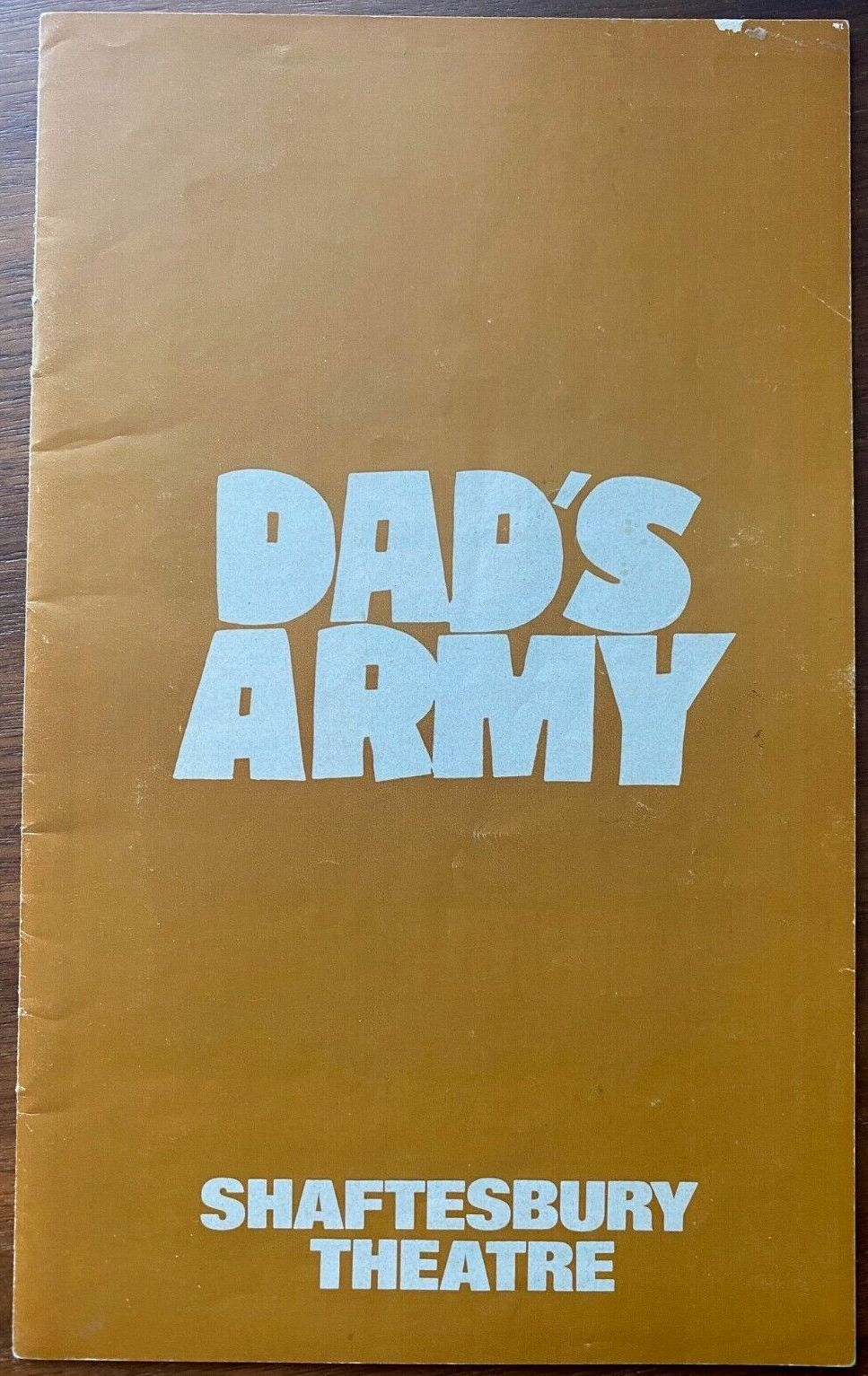
Shaftesbury Theatre programme, 1975

The show opened at the Forum Theatre, Billingham, County Durham on 4 September 1975 for a two-week try out. A local critic wrote of the event:

"The special bond of affection between cast and audience helped each item spark along" - Kevin Eason

After cuts and revisions, the show transferred to London's West End and opened at the Shaftesbury Theatre on 2 October 1975. On the opening night there was a surprise appearance by Chesney Allen, singing the old Flanagan and Allen song Hometown with Arthur Lowe.

The show ran in the West End until February 1976, where it was disrupted twice by bomb scares, and then toured the country until 4 September 1976. Jack Haig took over from Clive Dunn as Lance Corporal Jones for the second half of the tour. The stage show was later revived, billed as Dad’s Army—The Musical, and toured Australia and New Zealand in 2004–2005, starring Jon English.

=== 1976 UK tour dates ===
Venue	City	Start	Finish
Opera House	Manchester	Tuesday 23 March 1976	Saturday 10 April 1976
Theatre Royal	Nottingham	Monday 12 April 1976	Saturday 1 May 1976
Bradford Alhambra	Bradford	Monday 3 May 1976	Saturday 15 May 1976
Hippodrome	Birmingham	Monday 17 May 1976	Saturday 22 May 1976
Pavilion Theatre	Bournemouth	Monday 24 May 1976	Saturday 5 June 1976
Winter Gardens	Blackpool	Monday 7 June 1976	Saturday 19 June 1976
Theatre Royal	Newcastle	Monday 21 June 1976	Saturday 3 July 1976
Richmond Theatre	Richmond upon Thames	Monday 12 July 1976	Saturday 24 July 1976
Theatre Royal	Brighton	Monday 26 July 1976	Saturday 21 August 1976
Theatre Royal	Bath	Monday 23 August 1976	Saturday 4 September 1976

== Running order ==
=== Act One ===
- Scene 1 Who do you think you are kidding Mr Hitler?
- Scene 2 Put that light out
- Scene 3 When Can I Have a Banana Again?
- Scene 4 Command Post
- Scene 5 Private Pike's Dream
- Scene 6 Cliff top: Lance Corporal Jones stands guard
- Scene 7 Battle of Britain
- Scene 8 Choir practice

=== Act Two ===
- Scene 9 The song that we would rather forget
- Scene 10 Unarmed combat
- Scene 11 Tinpan alley
- Scene 12 Morris Dance
- Scene 13 A Nightingale sang in Berkley Square
- Scene 14 Radio personalities of the 40s
- Scene 15 The beach
- Scene 16 Finale

== New stage show ==
In April 2007 a new Dad's Army stage show was announced. It featured two lost episodes ("The Loneliness of the Long Distance Walker" and "A Stripe for Frazer") combined with two additional episodes "Room at the Bottom" (of which only a black-and-white version survived, until its colour was recreated in December 2008) and "The Deadly Attachment". A sequel to the 2007 stage show was announced in December 2009 with the tour starting the following year. It features the same cast as the 2007 show, but has different episodes, including "Branded" and "Mum's Army".

== Bibliography ==
- Croft, D & Perry, J, Dad's Army: the lost episodes. London: Virgin, 1998 ISBN 1-85227-757-2
- Pritchard, T: Stonehouse, Dad's Army- an appreciation. Dad's Army Appreciation Society, 2004 ISBN 0-9547702-0-X
- Webber, R, Complete A-Z of Dad's Army. London Orion 2000 ISBN 0-7528-1838-4
