= Under Fire (Dad's Army) =

Episode of the British sitcom Dad's Army

- Dad's Army episode
- Episode no.: Series 2 Episode 6
- Directed by: Harold Snoad
- Story by: Jimmy Perry and David Croft
- Original air date: 5 April 1969
- Running time: 30 minutes

Episode chronology
← Previous "A Stripe for Frazer"	Next → "The Armoured Might of Lance Corporal Jones"

"Under Fire" is a missing episode in the British comedy series Dad's Army. It was originally transmitted on Saturday 5 April 1969. One of the three missing Dad's Army episodes, the videotape was wiped for reuse. The last episode of series 2, it was the final Dad's Army episode to be recorded in black and white.

== Plot ==
The platoon arrest a suspect agent, who insists on being a British citizen, despite his accent, and the fact that he has a dog called Fritz. He attempts to help them put out a fire in the church hall, and is then found to be Warden Hodges' uncle. He comments that he doesn't know how Britain will win the war, and Wilson agrees.

== Cast ==
- Arthur Lowe as Captain Mainwaring
- John Le Mesurier as Sergeant Wilson
- Clive Dunn as Lance Corporal Jones
- John Laurie as Private Frazer
- James Beck as Private Walker
- Arnold Ridley as Private Godfrey
- Ian Lavender as Private Pike
- Geoffrey Lumsden as Corporal-Colonel Square
- Janet Davies as Mavis Pike
- John Ringham as Captain Bailey
- Queenie Watts as Mrs Keen
- Gladys Dawson as Mrs Witt
- Ernst Ulman as Sigmund Murphy
- Bill Pertwee as ARP Warden Hodges
- June Peterson as the woman

=== Remake ===
- Kevin McNally as Captain Mainwaring
- Robert Bathurst as Sergeant Wilson
- Kevin Eldon as Lance Corporal Jones
- David Hayman as Private Frazer
- Mathew Horne as Private Walker
- Timothy West as Private Godfrey
- Tom Rosenthal as Private Pike
- David Horovitch as Corporal-Colonel Square
- Tracy-Ann Oberman as Mavis Pike
- William Andrews as Captain Bailey
- Tamzin Griffin as Mrs Keen
- Thelma Ruby as Mrs Witt
- Philip Pope as Sigmund Murphy
- Simon Ludders as ARP Warden Hodges
- Joann Condon as the woman

== Notes ==
1. Known as one of the three missing Dad's Army episodes, after the tape was wiped by the BBC for reuse. The other two are The Loneliness of the Long Distance Walker and A Stripe for Frazer.
2. Before being wiped, the episode was repeated on 29 August 1969.
3. Gold commissioned recreations of all three missing episodes. The remake of this episode was first broadcast on 27 August 2019.
4. In 2023, a new animated version of this episode was broadcast as one of a series of animated recreations of all of the missing episodes. Owing to the audio of the broadcast episode also being missing, the radio series episode was used instead.
5. It is never explained in the radio episode (and presumably the television episode as well), what the flashing light was and who was responsible. Despite the fact that Mrs Keen claims to have clearly seen Sigmund Murphy signalling to the enemy during previous air raids, the implication is he is innocent of the crime. Who is responsible for the flashing light Frazer and Godfrey saw, and what its intention was, is never revealed.

== Radio Episode ==
The radio episode still exists. It was Episode 11 of the 1st radio series.
