= Cornish Floral Dance (Dad's Army sketch) =

- Dad's Army episode
- Directed by: David Croft
- Story by: Jimmy Perry and David Croft
- Original air date: 25 December 1970
- Running time: 11 mins

Episode chronology
← Previous "Fallen Idol"	Next → "Battle of the Giants!"

"Cornish Floral Dance" is the third Christmas Night with the Stars sketch from the British comedy series Dad's Army. It was originally transmitted on Christmas Day (Friday, 25 December) 1970, and again for the Royal Variety Performance of 1975. The latter still exists. The first version does not, although extracts and the soundtrack survive. It was recorded on 4 December 1970.

== Synopsis ==
The platoon, air raid wardens and a number of ladies from the local Women's Voluntary Service congregate in the church hall to rehearse for a performance of 1911 song The Floral Dance.

== Plot ==
The Walmington-on-Sea Home Guard have joined forces with Chief ARP Warden Hodges and ladies from the local WRVS to form a choir and they are practising for an upcoming Christmas concert that they intend to give to wounded troops from the Duke of Cornwall's Light Infantry. Due to the origin of their audience, they are all dressed in the costume of Cornish smocks.

After "winning" a coin toss, Captain Mainwaring has naturally assumed the role of conductor, much to the annoyance of Hodges and then proclaims that they will begin with the Floral Dance. Mainwaring leads the choir with Sergeant Wilson accompanying on the piano. Wilson though has difficulty in hitting the correct note because one of the keys is not working. Mainwaring, without understanding the nuances of a piano keyboard, tells him to use another note, but with no real option has to play in a different key. There follows some jollity with ladies and then the men in the choir being unable to follow the key chosen, now being too high or too low. Subsequently, Wilson then investigates inside the piano, and discovers that Private Walker has hidden a bottle of black market whisky in there. Mainwaring is furious, and he tells Walker to get rid of it, adding "I never want to see it again." Walker laughs "Please yourself, it was your Christmas present!"

Now that the whisky is removed, they can use the piano more appropriately. Cue scenes of Corporal Jones coming in too early on the solo part "Borne from afar on the gentle breeze", followed by the next line which he splits between the platoon members. He gives Pike "Fiddle and cello", but on hearing this, Wilson laughs heartily, and asks "Wouldn't it be better really, if Walker was on the fiddle?" (a pun on Walker's black market activities). Ignoring this, Mainwaring gives Walker "Big bass drum" instead. When it comes to the final instrument, "Euphonium", he is a platoon member short, at which point Walker suggests "Why don’t we split that up? I mean Jonesie here can be the 'U, I'll be the 'Pho', and Pikey can be the 'Bum!'" (a pun on the English use of bum, meaning buttocks). Mainwaring is furious and threatens to send Walker home until Hodges intervenes and volunteers to take the "Euphonium" line.

It goes well till Frazer’s line of "Big trombone" where he adds a "Whoop!". Mainwaring stops them, and points out to Frazer that there is no "Whoop!" after big trombone. Frazer, in thick Scots brogue, says "I ken (know) that's fine, I was just trying to buck up a kind of peely-wally English tune." Mainwaring says "Yes all right, we can do very well without it thank you very much" and Frazer adds "It’ll no be as good!".

They begin again, and it goes fine to the end of the verse - at this point a visual gag occurs which is not discernable via the existing soundtrack, but probably involved the Captain falling off his rostrum and coming back up with glasses and cap askew (a piece of business used regularly in many Dad's Army episodes).

On to the final part, which is to be sung by Private Pike. Wilson, having twice previously come in too early does so again, and Mainwaring finally snaps and shouts "Wilson! Wilson! Do not anticipate!! Watch (for) the blo.... watch the stick!!". Driven to distraction he nearly says "bloody" which would have offended many television viewers in the 1970s, let alone the ladies in the 1940s choir. Pike begins his solo, reading word for word from his song sheet "I felt so lonely standing there, and I could only stand and stare. For I have no boy/girl with me. Lonely..." Mainwaring stops him and asks "Why are you singing 'I have no boy/girl with me'?", to which Pike replies "That’s what it says here." He shows the Captain, who, now exasperated, explains "If you’re a boy, you have a girl! If you’re a girl you have a boy! Do you understand?" Pike replies "Yes." Mainwaring adds "You stupid boy!" and if that was not enough of a clue, Pike asks the plaintive question "Well what am I then?" Walker chips in with "We're all beginning to wonder!"

Finally, for the grand finale to the sketch, there is one last run-though, and despite Pike singing his lines as "I felt so lonely standing there, and I could only stand and stare, for I had no boy with me...", the choir actually sounds really good together.

== Cast ==
- Arthur Lowe as Captain Mainwaring
- John Le Mesurier as Sergeant Wilson
- Clive Dunn as Lance Corporal Jones
- John Laurie as Private Frazer
- James Beck as Private Walker
- Arnold Ridley as Private Godfrey
- Ian Lavender as Private Pike
- Bill Pertwee as ARP Warden
- Colin Bean as Private Sponge
- Hugh Hastings as Private Hastings
- George Hancock as Private Hancock

== Notes ==
1. Part of this short episode's script was recycled for a scene in the radio adaptation of Series 7 Episode 4, "The Godiva Affair", replacing a visual Morris dance scene from the television version.
2. The script was also used in part of the Dad's Army stage play, a segment of which was also included in 1975 's Royal Variety Performance, recorded at the London Palladium and broadcast on ITV. Also within the Dad's Army Appreciation Society archives a video of the theatre performance exists.
3. This episode no longer exists in visual form. However, a domestic audio recording of this special was uncovered and was included as an extra on BBC DVD releases. l. The audio also appears on The Lost Tapes CD along with the missing 1969 Series 2 episode "A Stripe for Frazer" and the 1968 Christmas Night With The Stars sketch.
4. This episode was recorded prior to the recording of the TV episode "Uninvited Guests".
5. A more detailed version of the plot can be found on the Dad's Army Appreciation Society New Zealand Branch website.
