= Resisting the Aggressor Down the Ages =

- Dad's Army episode
- Directed by: David Croft
- Story by: Jimmy Perry and David Croft
- Original air date: 25 December 1969
- Running time: 10 mins

Episode chronology
← Previous "Sons of the Sea"	Next → "The Big Parade"

"Resisting the Aggressor Down the Ages" is the second Christmas Night with the Stars sketch from the British comedy series Dad's Army. It was originally transmitted on Christmas Day 1969.

== Synopsis ==
The platoon are busy rehearsing their performance for the town pageant, a propaganda show to inspire the locals and raise funds for "War Weapons Week".

== Plot ==
The platoon's pageant item tells of England's defeat of many oppressors down the ages, including Julius Caesar (played by Godfrey), William the Conqueror (Frazer), Philip of Spain (Pike) and Napoleon (Wilson). Captain Mainwaring, in the guise of John Bull, is, as usual, struggling to motivate his platoon to give convincing performances.

The conceit of the item is that England has always defeated its aggressors (generally ignoring historical fact), with each aggressor in turn saying "England shall be crushed, never to rise again" and each segment ending with the proclamation "The aggressor shall not pass, the aggressor did not pass" jointly said by the spirits of Agriculture and Commerce (Jones and Walker respectively).

However, the rehearsal is rudely interrupted by an air raid and Chief ARP Warden Hodges brings a bailed out Luftwaffe pilot to see the Home Guard. When presented to Captain Mainwaring, the airman proclaims, "England shall be crushed, never to rise again – Heil Hitler!", at which point Corporal Jones pokes the pilot from behind with a pitchfork (to the pilot's obvious discomfort) and proclaims: "They don't like it up 'em, Captain Mainwaring".

== Cast ==
- Arthur Lowe as Captain Mainwaring / John Bull
- John Le Mesurier as Sergeant Wilson / Napoleon
- Clive Dunn as Lance Corporal Jones / Spirit of Agriculture
- John Laurie as Private Frazer / William the Conqueror
- James Beck as Private Walker / Spirit of Commerce
- Arnold Ridley as Private Godfrey / Julius Caesar
- Ian Lavender as Private Pike / Philip II of Spain
- Bill Pertwee as ARP Warden
- Robert Aldous as German Pilot

== Notes ==
1. An extract from this sketch was shown as part of Fry & Laurie Host a Christmas Night of the Stars BBC2 special broadcast 27 December 1994 as part of a 20-minute Dad's Army item.
2. Robert Aldous also appeared as another German pilot in the Series 3 episode "Man Hunt", which was recorded on the same day.
3. Mainwaring asks Wilson (who is dressed as Napoleon) if he has seen Charles Boyer in a film with Greta Garbo, to which Wilson says that he has not. This film becomes an important plot point of the Series 5 episode "A Soldier's Farewell", where the platoon watches the film at a cinema (for which a reenactment clip is shown) which leads to Mainwaring dreaming that he is Napoleon.
