= Sgt. Wilson's Little Secret =

Episode of the British sitcom Dad's Army

- Dad's Army episode
- Episode no.: Series 2 Episode 4
- Directed by: Harold Snoad
- Story by: Jimmy Perry and David Croft
- Original air date: 22 March 1969
- Running time: 30 minutes

Episode chronology
← Previous "The Loneliness of the Long Distance Walker"	Next → "A Stripe for Frazer"

"Sgt. Wilson's Little Secret" is an episode in the British tv comedy series Dad's Army. It was originally transmitted on Saturday 22 March 1969.

== Synopsis ==
When Mrs Pike plans to take in an evacuee, Wilson misunderstands and thinks that she is pregnant. Mainwaring orders him to marry her, and just as the preparations are under way, Mrs Pike leads in a 10-year-old Cockney evacuee also named Arthur. The wedding doesn't take place.

== Plot ==
Tensions rise when Sgt. Arthur Wilson’s close friendship with widow Mavis Pike starts sparking rumours in the town of Walmington-on-Sea. The gossip takes a surprising turn when Mavis reveals that she is expecting a child, leading the Home Guard members—and especially Captain Mainwaring—to assume that Wilson is the father. Mainwaring, proud of his moral standards, is scandalized by Wilson's supposed indiscretion and can't resist meddling in what he believes is Wilson's personal responsibility.

As the rumours spread, the platoon is abuzz with opinions on Wilson's presumed impending fatherhood. Wilson, in his typically laid-back and reserved manner, seems indifferent to the speculation, much to Mainwaring’s annoyance. The situation reaches a climax during the Home Guard’s manoeuvres, where the misunderstandings and assumptions pile up, leading to comedic mishaps. Eventually, the truth is revealed, and the episode ends on a note of camaraderie, as the misunderstanding is humorously cleared up, much to the relief of everyone involved.

== Cast ==
- Arthur Lowe as Captain Mainwaring
- John Le Mesurier as Sergeant Wilson
- Clive Dunn as Lance Corporal Jones
- John Laurie as Private Frazer
- James Beck as Private Walker
- Arnold Ridley as Private Godfrey
- Ian Lavender as Private Pike
- Janet Davies as Mrs Pike
- Graham Harboard as Little Arthur (portrayed by Bill Pertwee in the audio drama)

== Episode status ==
Until 2001, when two "lost" episodes ("Operation Kilt" and "The Battle of Godfrey's Cottage") were found, "Sgt. Wilson's Little Secret" was the only episode surviving from the second series.

== Notes ==
Even though in this episode it becomes common knowledge (erroneously as it turns out) that Sergeant Wilson and Mrs Pike are expecting a baby and so have decided to get married, from the next episode onwards things appear to have been retconned and as a consequence their “relationship” becomes a secret again to everyone, including Frank Pike.
