= Dad's Army missing episodes =

Lost episodes of Dad's Army

The Dad's Army missing episodes are lost episodes and sketches of the British television sitcom Dad's Army. The programme ran for nine series from 31 July 1968 to 13 November 1977. Three out of six episodes from the second series and two of the four Christmas sketches are missing because, at that time, the BBC routinely reused videotape as a cost-saving measure.

== Background ==
Until 1978, when the BBC Film and Videotape Library was created as a permanent archive for all its television programmes, the BBC had no central archive. The videotapes and film recordings stored in the BBC's various libraries were often either wiped or discarded for recording new programmes and to free storage space to reduce costs. The BBC Film Library kept only some programmes that were made on film, whilst the Engineering Department handled videotape but had no mandate to retain material. Some shows were kept by BBC Enterprises, but they too had limited storage space and only kept material that was considered commercially exploitable. In the mid-1970s, BBC Enterprises disposed of much older material for which the rights to sell the programmes had expired, and the Engineering Department routinely wiped videotapes in an era when rescreening potential was limited.

The first two series (12 episodes) of Dad's Army were made in black-and-white, with almost all episodes made on two-inch quad videotape for initial broadcast. The first series was thought to have commercial potential overseas, and was offered for sale to foreign broadcasters by BBC Enterprises. To this end, 16mm film copies were made of the first six episodes by the BBC Engineering Department before the master videotapes were wiped, and these were retained by the Film Unit.

In the event, the first series sold very poorly and so BBC Enterprises did not express any interest in selling Series 2 abroad. Thus very few film copies of episodes from series 2 were made. Dad's Army was made in colour from series 3 onwards; overseas interest in the series picked up, and BBC Enterprises resumed offering the episodes for sale in film and video format; this meant they were more likely to be permanently retained.

== Recovery ==
In 1998, David Croft, one of the co-creators of Dad's Army, made an appeal on BBC Two asking people if they held copies of the missing episodes. At the time, five of the six episodes of series 2 were missing; "Sgt. Wilson's Little Secret" had survived the cull as it was recorded onto 35 mm film instead of videotape, either because it required additional editing (which was easier with film before electronic timecode editing) or because no videotape recording facilities were available in the recording period. The fact that the copy was on film rather than videotape ensured the episode's survival, as it fell within the BBC Film Library's remit of retaining filmed productions.

In 2001, three years after Croft's appeal, 16 mm film recordings of "Operation Kilt" and "The Battle of Godfrey's Cottage" were returned to the BBC archive. It has since been established that the two episodes were film recorded to show to executives at Columbia Pictures during discussions on the structure of the Dad's Army feature film. The film copies were then junked and retrieved from a skip by an opportunistic collector and stored in a garden shed for 30 years until returned to the BBC. When returned, the film cans were in a poor condition and the films themselves had seriously deteriorated. Following restoration by BBC technicians, both episodes were broadcast repeatedly on air.

The three episodes from series 2 that remain missing are "The Loneliness of the Long Distance Walker", "A Stripe for Frazer" and "Under Fire". There are three likely sources for recovering these episodes, if they are still in existence:

1. The episodes were recorded off-air during their original UK broadcasts by using an early videotape recorder such as a Shibaden or Sony CV-2000 machine
2. The episodes were recorded off-air during their original UK broadcasts by having a 8 mm or 16mm camera pointed at the television screen
3. The episodes were copied as 16 mm tele-recordings, which were subsequently saved from being junked

However these three episodes were among the 67 adapted for BBC Radio in the 1970s, and recordings of the radio episodes still exist.

On 17 October 2024, the Film Is Fabulous project returned a print of the already existing episode The Battle of Godfrey's Cottage to the BBC Archives. This particular copy was higher quality than the copy that was returned in 2001, as well as confirming the episode had no missing minutes, the only difference being a characteristic of the editing.

=== Christmas sketches ===
Two of the four Christmas sketches which aired as part of Christmas Night with the Stars – "Santa On Patrol" from 1968 and the "Cornish Floral Dance" from 1970, both of which were made in colour – remain missing, though audio recordings of both have been recovered. The "Cornish Floral Dance" was also performed at the Royal Variety Performance of 1975. This second version is still extant.

=== Colour episodes ===
The colour episodes in series 3–9 have been remarkably fortunate compared with many of their contemporaries. Missing episodes were returned from overseas broadcasters, mainly from those in Europe, New Zealand and Australia, with the result that all full-length episodes now exist in the original colour format.

=== Compared with other series ===
Of all ongoing BBC series from the 1960s, only Steptoe and Son and Maigret have a similar survival record, with all episodes from both series existing in some form. Compared with other BBC series broadcast in the 1960s, Dad's Army is comparatively rare amongst contemporaries in that it is one of the few BBC series (along with Doctor Who and The Morecambe and Wise Show) to have all of its 1970s episodes exist as masters or telerecordings, while other series such as Z-Cars and Dixon of Dock Green are missing episodes from as late as 1975.

== Restoration and recreation ==
Episode restoration and recreation

"Room at the Bottom" – to the left is the 16 mm black and white copy; to the right is the restored colour version.

"A Stripe for Frazer" – a scene from the animated episode

Kevin McNally as Captain Mainwaring and Robert Bathurst as Sergeant Wilson in Dad's Army: The Lost Episodes

=== Colour restoration ===
By the 1990s, "Room at the Bottom", the sixth episode of Series 3, was the only episode produced in colour that did not have a colour copy in the archive; instead, it survived only as a 16 mm black-and-white film recording. Because of the way in which the original black and white recordings were made, colour information was sometimes inadvertently preserved in them even though it could not be displayed; this colour information is known as chroma dots. In 2008, a computer technique of colour recovery was developed to recover the chroma dot information from black and white recordings to recreate a usable colour signal. "Room at the Bottom" was used as the pilot project to test this process of colour recovery, with the success of the episode's restoration leading to it being used on other 16mm recordings. The new colour copy was officially adopted as the BBC's archive copy, and "Room at the Bottom" was broadcast in colour for the first time in almost forty years on 13 December 2008.

=== Recreations ===
==== Restagings ====
Although not a deliberate attempt to restore lost material, the "Cornish Floral Dance" was also performed at the Royal Variety Performance of 1975. This second version is still extant.

==== Animation ====
In 2008, the soundtrack of "A Stripe for Frazer" was rediscovered in the hands of a private collector. This recording was then digitally remastered for a 2015 BBC Audio CD release. In January 2016, it was announced that the BBC were creating an animated version of the episode, to be combined with the newly discovered copy of the audio, which was released via the BBC Store online service.

Pre-production for "A Stripe for Frazer" began in October 2015, and a little under 12 weeks later the finished animated episode was released on BBC Store on 4 February 2016. The animation was produced and directed for BBC Worldwide by Charles Norton and a team that included comic book artist, Martin Geraghty.

In October 2023, UKTV announced that it had produced animated versions of the remaining missing episodes for broadcast on its Gold channel alongside "A Stripe for Frazer". These were produced using the same production team that was originally assembled for "A Stripe for Frazer". The series ran to four episodes, with versions of the three missing episodes from Series 2, plus an additional episode containing the two missing sketches from Christmas Night with the Stars. While the original audio from both "A Stripe for Frazer" and the two Christmas sketches was extant and available to be used alongside the animation, for the remaining two episodes the already existing radio series episodes were used as alternatives. For both "The Loneliness of the Long-Distance Walker" and "Under Fire", neither James Beck nor Ian Lavender appeared in the radio adaptations, and they were therefore not part of the cast of the animated versions of the episodes. The characters were instead redubbed by actors David Benson and Jack Lane, who created the two-man theatrical show "Dad's Army Radio Show".

==== Remake ====
In 2018, UKTV announced plans to recreate the three missing episodes for broadcast on its Gold channel under the title Dad's Army: The Lost Episodes. Mercury Productions, the company responsible for Saluting Dad's Army, Gold's 50th anniversary tribute series, produced the episodes, directed by Ben Kellett. The recreations were broadcast in 2019, coinciding with the 50th anniversary of their original broadcast on the BBC. Kevin McNally and Robert Bathurst were the initial casting announcements as Captain Mainwaring and Sergeant Wilson, with Bernard Cribbins portraying Private Godfrey. The full cast was announced in January 2019, with McNally, Bathurst and Cribbins joined by Kevin Eldon, Mathew Horne, David Hayman and Tom Rosenthal. However, Bernard Cribbins subsequently withdrew from the project, and was replaced as Godfrey by Timothy West. The recreated episodes were shown in August 2019 and released on DVD & Blu Ray on 25 November 2019 by the British Network imprint. The series also ran on Yesterday on 25–28 August 2020.

| No. | Title | Original series number | Original episode airdate | Recorded date | Original release date |
|---|---|---|---|---|---|
| 1 | "The Loneliness of the Long Distance Walker" | 2.3 | 15 March 1969 | 1 March 2019 | 25 August 2019 |
Walker is called up into the army. The platoon, anxious at how they will obtain off-the-ration supplies without him, fight to keep him.
| 2 | "A Stripe for Frazer" | 2.5 | 29 March 1969 | 8 March 2019 | 26 August 2019 |
Mainwaring has the opportunity to promote someone to corporal. Rather than promote Jones, he tests who has the greatest potential by temporarily promoting Private Frazer to lance corporal. Frazer's increasingly dictatorial manner soon alienates the platoon.
| 3 | "Under Fire" | 2.6 | 5 April 1969 | 15 March 2019 | 27 August 2019 |
When Frazer spots what he believes to be a German spy signalling planes, the platoon arrests a suspect who protests that he is a naturalised Englishman.

===== Cast =====
- Kevin McNally – Captain Mainwaring
- Robert Bathurst – Sergeant Wilson
- Kevin Eldon – Lance Corporal Jones
- David Hayman – Private Frazer
- Mathew Horne – Private Walker
- Timothy West – Private Godfrey
- Tom Rosenthal – Private Pike

== List of missing episodes ==
| Series no. | Episode no. | Title | Recorded | Original airdate | Notes | | | Recreations | |
| Series no. | Episode no. | Title | Recorded | Original airdate | Video | Audio | Radio episode | Remake | Animation |
Episodes
| 2 | 9 | "The Loneliness of the Long Distance Walker" | 27 October 1968 | 15 March 1969 | Missing | Missing | Exists | Yes | Yes |
| 2 | 11 | "A Stripe for Frazer" | 15 November 1968 | 29 March 1969 | Missing | Exists | Exists | Yes | Yes |
| 2 | 12 | "Under Fire" | 27 November 1968 | 5 April 1969 | Missing | Missing | Exists | Yes | Yes |
Christmas sketches
| N/A | 1 | "Santa On Patrol" | 27 October 1968 | 25 December 1968 | Missing | Exists | None | No | Yes (Note: Renamed as "Poles Apart" for the animated version broadcast by UKTV Gold in November 2023.) |
| N/A | 3 | "Cornish Floral Dance" | 4 December 1970 | 25 December 1970 | Missing | Exists | Exists (Note: Video still missing, amateur soundtrack recording found (can be heard as an extra on the Christmas Specials DVD). The script was recycled for a scene in the radio adaptation of The Godiva Affair and as part of the Dad's Army stage show (a segment of which was also included in the 1975 Royal Variety Performance).) | No | Yes |

== Further research ==
=== Documentaries ===
- Dad's Army: Missing Presumed Wiped (2001) – a 30-minute documentary about episode recoveries and restoration.
- Time Shift – Missing Believed Wiped (2003) – a general documentary about archive television, featuring some clips and discussions about Dad's Army.

== Overseas broadcasters ==
The following is a list of overseas broadcasters who purchased the second series of Dad's Army.

| Country | TV Network(s) |
|---|---|
| Australia | ABC |
| Bahrain | BRTC |
| Barbados | CBC |
| Finland | Yle |
| Gibraltar | GBC |
| British Hong Kong | RTV |
| Jamaica | JBC |
| Malta | TVM |
| Netherlands | NOS |
| New Zealand | NZBC |
| Nigeria | RKTV |
| Saudi Arabia | |
| Singapore | Channel 5 |
| Sweden | SVT |
| SFR Yugoslavia | JRT |
| Zambia | ZNBC |

== See also ==
- BBC Archive Treasure Hunt
- Missing Believed Wiped
- Doctor Who missing episodes
