= A Stripe for Frazer =

Episode of the British sitcom Dad's Army

- Dad's Army episode
- Episode no.: Series 2 Episode 5
- Directed by: Harold Snoad
- Story by: Jimmy Perry and David Croft
- Original air date: 29 March 1969
- Running time: 30 minutes

Episode chronology
← Previous "Sgt. Wilson's Little Secret"	Next → "Under Fire"

"A Stripe for Frazer" is a missing episode of the British television comedy series Dad's Army. It was originally transmitted on 29 March 1969. Of the three missing Dad's Army episodes (all from the second series) it was the first to be reconstructed using animation.

== Synopsis ==
Frazer is promoted to Lance Corporal, and battles with Jones for further promotion.

== Plot ==
When Captain Bailey informs Mainwaring that he can make up another lance corporal, Frazer is chosen. Jones and Frazer both try desperately to impress Mainwaring into making them a corporal, and Frazer issues many charge sheets. The episode ends with Frazer breaking into Mainwaring's office with a boat-hook.

== Cast ==
- Arthur Lowe as Captain Mainwaring
- John Le Mesurier as Sergeant Wilson
- Clive Dunn as Lance Corporal Jones
- John Laurie as Private Frazer
- James Beck as Private Walker
- Arnold Ridley as Private Godfrey
- Ian Lavender as Private Pike
- Geoffrey Lumsden as Corporal-Colonel Square
- John Ringham as Captain Bailey
- Gordon Peters as Police Officer
- Edward Sinclair as Caretaker

== Status ==
Screenshot from animated episode

This episode is one of three missing Dad's Army episodes after the tapes were wiped by the BBC for reuse. The other two are "The Loneliness of the Long Distance Walker" and "Under Fire".

=== Animation ===
In November 2008 the soundtrack of this episode was returned to the BBC, and, in 2016, the BBC released an animated version of the episode via its BBC Store online service. This version of the episode used the original 1969 audio with new hand-drawn animation synchronised to the soundtrack. The animated version was broadcast by Gold in November 2023 alongside newly commissioned animated versions of the other missing episodes. It was also released on DVD on the Dad's Army - The Missing Episodes in November 2023

=== Remake ===
UKTV Gold commissioned recreations of all three missing episodes. The remake of this episode was first broadcast on 26 August 2019. The new cast are:

- Kevin McNally as Captain Mainwaring
- Robert Bathurst as Sergeant Wilson
- Kevin Eldon as Lance Corporal Jones
- David Hayman as Private Frazer
- Mathew Horne as Private Walker
- Timothy West as Private Godfrey
- Tom Rosenthal as Private Pike
- David Horovitch as Corporal-Colonel Square
- William Andrews as Captain Bailey
- John Biggins as the Verger
- Jack Barry as the policeman

== Broadcast ==
The second series was scheduled originally to be broadcast in January 1969. Instead, the BBC decided to repeat the first series in January 1969 because they believed many people had missed the series when it had started in the summer of 1968. Consequently, "A Stripe for Frazer" was originally planned for transmission on 27 January 1969, but was delayed until 29 March 1969. It was repeated on 5 September 1969.

== Radio episode ==
The radio version of this episode was adapted by Michael Knowles and Harold Snoad and was first broadcast on 18 March 1974.
