= The Recruit (Dad's Army) =

- Dad's Army episode
- Episode no.: Series 6 Episode 7
- Directed by: David Croft
- Story by: Jimmy Perry and David Croft
- Original air date: 12 December 1973
- Running time: 30 minutes

Episode chronology
| ← Previous "Things That Go Bump in the Night" | Next → "Everybody's Trucking" |

"The Recruit" is the seventh episode of the sixth series of the British television sitcom Dad's Army. It was originally transmitted on 12 December 1973.

== Synopsis ==
Captain Mainwaring is indisposed due to an ingrowing toenail, so Sergeant Wilson takes charge temporarily of the platoon. When, however, he allows the vicar and the verger to join the ranks, the rest of the men are far from happy.

== Plot ==
With Captain Mainwaring absent from the platoon, Sergeant Wilson signs on two new recruits into the platoon, the vicar and the verger. When Mainwaring returns from hospital, he learns of the changes that Wilson has made and does not approve. However he can do nothing about it as the official papers for the vicar and verger have already been sent to GHQ. Mainwaring states that he will not go easy on the two of them.

On their first night on watch, the vicar and the verger have a run-in with a young boy who gives them nothing but trouble. The boy mocks them by answering "Adolf" when challenged by "Halt! Who goes there?" Unable to handle the situation, they call for the rest of the section, who identify the boy as a local troublemaker. Mainwaring arrives and asserts his authority on the boy and tells him to clear off. The boy states that he is going to "tell his Uncle Willie", who turns out to be the Chief Warden, Hodges.

Hodges confronts Mainwaring and his platoon about the way they treated his nephew. After a war of words breaks out between Hodges and the platoon, his nephew states that "they are almost as funny as the Wardens," which prompts Hodges to turn his anger on his nephew and they both run out of the church hall. After having a laugh, Mainwaring turns to the vicar and the verger and states that "This never would have happened if you had handled the situation properly." Upset with Mainwaring's attitude, the vicar resigns, prompting the verger to do the same.

== Cast ==
- Arthur Lowe as Captain Mainwaring
- John Le Mesurier as Sergeant Wilson
- Clive Dunn as Lance Corporal Jones
- John Laurie as Private Frazer
- Arnold Ridley as Private Godfrey
- Ian Lavender as Private Pike
- Bill Pertwee as ARP Warden Hodges
- Edward Sinclair as The Verger
- Frank Williams as The Vicar
- Susan Majolier as Nurse
- Lindsey Dunn as Hamish, the Small Boy

== Notes ==
1. This is the first episode not to feature James Beck (Walker), who was in a coma with acute pancreatitis during its recording. Beck died shortly thereafter; in this episode he is still billed during the end credits, but was removed from series 7 onwards. Walker's absence in this episode is explained by a note left in his place, saying he has "gone up to the smoke for a few days to do a deal" — this segment was hastily written into the script at the last minute when Beck became ill. In later series, the character was never referred to again. Walker was however written into the radio episode, played by Larry Martyn.
