= The Loneliness of the Long Distance Walker =

Episode of the British sitcom Dad's Army

- Dad's Army episode
- Episode no.: Series 2 Episode 3
- Directed by: David Croft
- Story by: Jimmy Perry and David Croft
- Original air date: 15 March 1969
- Running time: 30 minutes

Episode chronology
← Previous "The Battle of Godfrey's Cottage"	Next → "Sgt. Wilson's Little Secret"

"The Loneliness of the Long-Distance Walker" is a missing episode in the British comedy series Dad's Army. It was originally transmitted on 15 March 1969. One of the three missing Dad's Army episodes.

== Synopsis ==
To his complete surprise, Walker receives his call-up papers. Mainwaring tries his best to get the authorities to reconsider.

== Plot ==
When Private Walker is called up, he applies to the Military Service Hardship Committee, which rejects him on the grounds that he does not keep books for his business. After Jones's attempts to sabotage his medical test fail, Walker is invalided out because he is allergic to corned beef.

== Cast ==
- Arthur Lowe as Captain Mainwaring
- John Le Mesurier as Sergeant Wilson
- Clive Dunn as Lance Corporal Jones
- John Laurie as Private Frazer
- James Beck as Private Walker
- Arnold Ridley as Private Godfrey
- Ian Lavender as Private Pike
- Anthony Sharp as Brigadier (War Office)
- Diana King as Chairwoman
- Patrick Waddington as Brigadier
- Edward Evans as Mr Rees
- Michael Knowles as Captain Cutts
- Gilda Perry as Blonde
- Larry Martyn as Soldier
- Robert Lankesheer as Medical Officer
- Colin Bean as Private Sponge

=== Remake ===
- Kevin McNally as Captain Mainwaring
- Robert Bathurst as Sergeant Wilson
- Kevin Eldon as Lance Corporal Jones
- David Hayman as Private Frazer
- Mathew Horne as Private Walker
- Timothy West as Private Godfrey
- Tom Rosenthal as Private Pike
- Christopher Villiers as Brigadier (War Office)
- Sam Phillips as Captain Cutts
- Julia Deakin as the Chairwoman
- Andrew Havill as the Brigadier
- Jerry-Jane Pears as Judy
- Gareth Benjamin as Mr Rees
- Lee Barnett as the soldier

== Notes ==
1. This episode was originally planned for transmission on 20 January 1969.
2. This is one of the three missing Dad's Army episodes, after the tape was wiped by the BBC for reuse. The other two are A Stripe for Frazer and Under Fire.
3. UKTV Gold commissioned recreations of all three missing episodes. The remake of this episode was first broadcast on 25 August 2019.
4. In the remade episode, two cast members have a link to David Croft, Julia Deakin was in Oh Doctor Beeching! and Andrew Havill was in the 2016 film of Dad's Army.
5. In 2023, a new animated version of this episode was broadcast as one of a series of animated recreations of all of the missing episodes. Owing to the audio of the broadcast episode also being missing, the radio series episode (with Graham Stark as Walker) was used instead.
