= When Can I Have a Banana Again? =

1943 song

Song by Harry Roy
- Recorded: 23 October 1943
- Genre: Comic song
- Label: Regal Zonophone Records
- Songwriters: Nat Mills; Gaby Rogers; Harry Roy

When Can I Have a Banana Again? is a 1943 British comedy song which became a Second World War hit for the bandleader Harry Roy. It makes humorous reference to the complete shortage of bananas in Britain. While the singer is able to cope without other foodstuffs rationed in wartime, he laments the total absence of bananas which will only return with an Allied victory. A review in Gramophone described it as "slightly silly but well put over".

The song featured in the 1975 Dad's Army stage show.

== See also ==
- Yes! We Have No Bananas, which also gained popularity in the United Kingdom during World War II rationing

== Bibliography ==
- Chevalier, Natacha. Food in Wartime Britain: Testimonies from the Kitchen Front (1939–1945). Taylor & Francis, 2020.
- Murdoch, Brian. Fighting Songs and Warring Words: Popular Lyrics of Two World Wars. Taylor & Francis, 2002,
- Seeley, Robert & Bunnett, Rex. London Musical Shows on Record, 1889-1989. General Gramophone Publications, 1989.
