= Graham Hamilton =

British stage and television actor (born 1944)

- Born: James Graham Hamilton McOwat; 27 November 1944 (age 81); Leeds, England
- Education: Giggleswick School, Giggleswick, North Yorkshire Rose Bruford College, London, England
- Occupations: Actor, singer
- Years active: 1966–present

James Graham Hamilton McOwat (born 27 November 1944) is a British stage and television actor who served as the 15th President of Equity, the actors' trade union, from 2008 to 2010. Formerly vice-president for ten years, Hamilton has been involved in Equity's ruling Council since 1976, during his acting career in plays and musicals in the West End. He is known chiefly for his portrayal of Fagin in Lionel Bart's hit musical Oliver! After working in the West End, he played the villain in over twenty-one pantomimes, appearing at theatres throughout the UK, regularly starring opposite major variety acts like Cannon & Ball, Max Boyce, Roy Hudd, The Krankies, and Keith Harris & Orville. He was the architect of Equity's Annual Conference and the Rules that replaced the union's inadequate Annual General Meeting in 1995. In 2007, Equity's governing Council awarded him Honorary Life Membership of Equity for distinguished service to the union.

== Early life ==
Graham Hamilton was born on 27 November 1944 in Leeds, West Yorkshire. He was educated at Giggleswick School in North Yorkshire, where he was taught English and directed in school plays by Russell Harty when the television presenter and chat show host was a schoolmaster there. He trained as an actor at Rose Bruford College in London from 1963 to 1966.

== Selected credits ==
West End Theatre credits include:

- Oliver! (musical) as Fagin and Mr Sowerberry, the Undertaker (Albery Theatre, now Noel Coward Theatre, and pre-West End tour).
- Dad's Army (musical) as Private Meadow (Shaftesbury Theatre).
- Jeeves (musical) as Seppings, the Butler (His Majesty's Theatre).
- Oh! Calcutta! (revue) as various roles (Royalty Theatre, Duchess Theatre).
- The Mousetrap as Giles Ralston (Ambassadors Theatre).

Pantomime Seasons credits include:

- Captain Hook in Peter Pan - the Musical (Norwich Theatre Royal).
- Abanazar in Aladdin (Cardiff New, Lewisham Broadway).
- Sheriff of Nottingham in Babes in the Wood (Nottingham Theatre Royal, Oxford New, Bristol Hippodrome, Bradford Alhambra).
- King Rat in Dick Whittington and His Cat (Cardiff New, Southport Theatre, Bradford Alhambra).
- Fleshcreep, the Giant's Henchman, in Jack and the Beanstalk (Wolverhampton Grand, Cardiff New, Norwich Theatre Royal, Bradford Alhambra, Bournemouth Pavilion, Stockport Davenport, Aberdeen His Majesty's, Halifax Victoria).
- Will Atkins, the Pirate in Robinson Crusoe (Watford Palace).
- Poo Stink, the Evil Magician, in Puss in Boots (Watford Palace).
- Compost, the Giant's Henchman, in Jack and the Beanstalk (Watford Palace).

Repertory Theatre credits include plays at:

- Harrogate Theatre, Plymouth Athenaeum Theatre, St. Andrews Byre, Colchester Repertory Theatre, Billingham Forum, Leicester Haymarket.

Theatre Tours credits include:

- Oliver! (musical). Pre-West End tour. (See West End credits above). (Leicester Haymarket - Birmingham Alexandra - Wolverhampton Grand - Eastbourne Congress - Bournemouth Pavilion - Oxford New - Manchester Opera House).
- Billy Liar as Arthur Crabtree (Billingham Forum - Darlington Hippodrome - Newcastle Flora Robson Playhouse).

Summer Season/Tours credits include:

- We'll Meet Again (a Wartime revue) as Narrator/various roles (Blackpool North Pier - Llandudno Arcadia - Bridlington Spa).
- The Jimmy Cricket Show as Compere/Straight man (Paignton Festival - Weymouth Pavilion - Bridlington Spa - Great Yarmouth Britannia Pier - Southport Theatre).
- The Illuminations Laughter Show, starring The Krankies as Straight man (Blackpool Opera House).

Television credits include:

- All Creatures Great and Small as Sergeant Bannister/Soldier (BBC TV).
- Last of the Summer Wine as Gordon (BBC TV).
- It Ain't Half Hot, Mum as MP Sergeant (BBC TV).
- I Didn't Know You Cared as Patient (BBC TV).
- Rosie as Mr Robinson (BBC TV).
- Dad's Army (musical) as Private Meadow in the Royal Variety Performance at the London Palladium (ITV).
- General Hospital as PC Smith (ITV).
- Crimewatch UK as Villain (BBC TV).
- The Puppet Man as Father (Channel 4).
- Me, You and Him as Man in Pub (BBC TV).
- Not by the Book as Harry (BBC TV).
- Crime and Punishment as Court Usher (BBC TV).
- One Day as Will Mason (BBC TV).
- Crime Docudrama as Bar Customer (NBC Universal).
- The Art of Outdoor as TV Presenter (Heavenly/Knock Knock Productions).

Radio credits include:

- I Like Spike (a Spike Milligan anthology, two programmes) as various roles (BBC Radio).

== Discography ==
- Dad's Army (West End musical), Jeeves (West End musical), original cast recordings, Spike Milligan - At The Beeb (I Like Spike, an anthology) (BBC Radio).
