= Civil Service Supply Association =

Former department store in London

Coordinates: 51.5097°N 0.1237°W

Civil Service Supply Association was a department store on Strand, London. Founded in the 1860s in Blackfriars, the shop moved to Strand in the following decade, remaining open until 1982.

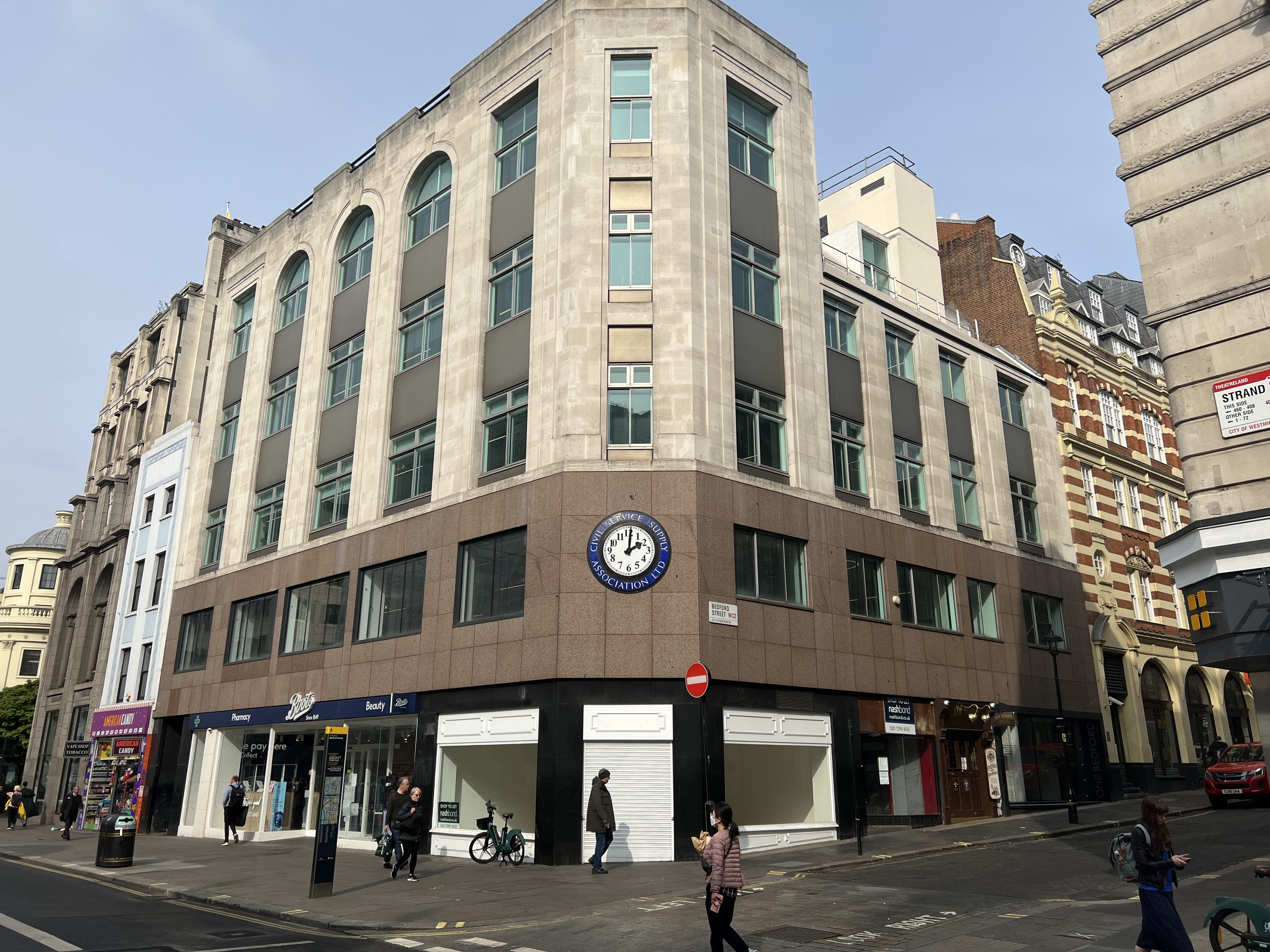
Civil Service Supply Association building (May 2022)

== History ==
In 1864, a group of clerks in the General Post Office joined together to buy a half chest of tea. Their first transaction resulted in them saving 9 pence to the pound, and they decided to extend their purchasing to coffee, sugar and other grocery products.

In January 1865, they formed the Post Office Supply Association, a co-operative with forty members. The co-operative was so successful that by April the scheme had been opened up to all civil servants and the name changed to the Civil Service Supply Association. Civil servants could purchase tickets for 2 shillings and sixpence, which would entitle them to purchase goods at the store or from firms associated with the association.

Initially located on Queen Victoria Street in Blackfriars, the co-operative moved to 6 Bedford Street, Covent Garden, in 1877, occupying a new building designed by architects Lockwood & Mawson. The store gradually expanded along the Bedford Street side of the block towards Strand. A new frontage was added at 425 Strand by 1925. In 1927, the co-operative was incorporated as a private company, becoming a fully fledged department store and severing its links with the Civil Service. By 1930, the store had taken over the remaining corner plot at Bedford Street and Strand, and the Strand frontage were completely rebuilt in the art deco style. The company was merged with Country and New Town Properties in 1969. The original store remained open until 1982 when it was closed following a severe fire.
