= Christmas Night with the Stars =

British television show

Christmas Night with the Stars is a television show broadcast each Christmas night by the BBC from 1958 to 1972 (with the exception of 1961, 1965 and 1966). The show was hosted each year by a leading star of BBC TV and featured specially-made short seasonal editions (typically about 10 minutes long) of the previous year's most successful BBC sitcoms and light entertainment programmes. Most of the variety segments no longer exist in accordance with the BBC's practice of discarding programmes at the time.

From 1969 to 1973, ITV countered with its own annual Christmas variety show, All Star Comedy Carnival, while the BBC itself resurrected the format in 1982 with a special titled The Funny Side of Christmas.

Since its original run, Christmas Night with the Stars has been revived twice, with Fry and Laurie in 1994, and with Michael Parkinson in 2003.

In 2005, the show was voted 24th in Channel 4's 100 Greatest Christmas Moments.

== Some featured television programmes ==
- All Gas and Gaiters
- The Benny Hill Show
- The Dick Emery Show
- Bachelor Father
- Beggar my Neighbour
- Dad's Army
- Dixon of Dock Green
- Faces of Jim
- The Goodies
- Hugh and I
- The Likely Lads
- Marriage Lines
- Not in Front of the Children
- Oh, Brother!
- On the Buses
- Steptoe and Son
- Sykes and a...
- The Likely Lads
- The Liver Birds
- The Rag Trade
- The Two Ronnies
- Till Death Us Do Part

== Chronological listing of episodes ==
=== 1958 Christmas Night with the Stars ===
Broadcast on Thursday 25 December 1958. Introduced by David Nixon and starring Charlie Chester with Eric 'Jeeves' Grier, The George Mitchell Singers and The Television Toppers, The Beverley Sisters, Charlie Drake with Dave Freeman, Perry Como, Ted Ray with Kenneth Connor, David Nixon with Sheila Holt, Tony Hancock with Totti Truman Taylor, Alec Bregonzi and Percy Edwards, Vera Lynn with The Lynnettes, Jimmy Edwards with Arthur Howard, John Stirling, David Langford and Jeremy Roughton, Billy Cotton and his Band with Alan Breeze and The Leslie Roberts Silhouettes, Jack Warner with Arthur Rigby, Jeannette Hutchinson, Peter Byrne, Anthony Parker, Moira Mannion and Graham Ashley.

=== 1959 Christmas Night with the Stars ===
Broadcast on Friday 25 December 1959. Introduced by David Nixon and starring Ken Mackintosh and his Orchestra, Jimmy Logan, David Hughes, Charlie Drake, Jack Warner, Joan Regan, Jimmy Edwards, and The Black and White Minstrels.

=== 1960 Christmas Night with the Stars ===
Broadcast on Sunday 25 December 1960. Introduced by David Nixon and starring The Mitchell Minstrels, The Television Toppers, Sid James with Bill Kerr, Liz Fraser, Sydney Tafler, Nina and Frederik, Harry Worth with Deryck Guyler, Hugh Lloyd, George Roderick, Kenneth McKellar with The Showtime Dancers, David Nixon and Robert Harbin, Stanley Baxter and Betty Marsden, Joan Regan, Jimmy Edwards with Arthur Howard, Cyril Fletcher, Pip Hinton, Eric Robinson, Johnny Vyvyan, Chan Canasta, The Showtime Dancers and the George Mitchell Singers

=== 1962 Christmas Night with the Stars ===
Broadcast on Tuesday 25 December 1962. Eamonn Andrews introduced contributions from the casts of the Billy Cotton Band Show, The Black and White Minstrel Show, Dixon of Dock Green, Steptoe and Son, The Rag Trade and The White Heather Club.

- The Billy Cotton Band Show – Billy Cotton and his Band with Alan Breeze, Kathie Kay, The High-Lights and The Leslie Roberts Silhouettes
- The Rag Trade – Peter Jones, Miriam Karlin, Reg Varney, Esma Cannon, with Barbara Windsor, Sheena Marshe, Patricia Denys, Claire Davenport
- A Song for Everyone – Kenneth McKellar with Tom McCall at the organ.
- Sykes and his Sister – Eric Sykes and Hattie Jacques
- Adam Sings – Adam Faith with Susan George
- Raise Your Glasses – Arthur Askey and Alan Melville with Mary Hignett, Alec Bregonzi, Ken Grief
- Juke Box Jury – David Jacobs, Sid James, Sydney Tafler, Terry Scott, Hugh Lloyd and Jill Curzon
- It's A Square World – Michael Bentine
- Cartoon by Biographic Cartoon Films Ltd.
- Russ's Requests – Russ Conway with The Billy Cotton Band
- The Christmas Face of Jim – Jimmy Edwards with June Whitfield, Ronnie Barker, Michael Brennan, Eunice Black
- The White Heather Club – Andy Stewart with The White Heather Dancers, Ian Powrie and his Band
- Steptoe and Son – Harry H. Corbett, Wilfrid Brambell
- The Black and White Minstrel Show – The Mitchell Minstrels and The Television Toppers
- Dixon of Dock Green – Jack Warner with Arthur Rigby, Peter Byrne, Jeannette Hutchinson, Geoffrey Adams, Anne Ridler, John Hughes, Christopher Gilmore, Jocelyne Rhodes

=== 1963 Christmas Night with the Stars ===
Broadcast on Wednesday 25 December 1963. Eamonn Andrews introduced contributions from Stanley Baxter, Michael Bentine, The Black and White Minstrels, Marriage Lines featuring Richard Briers and Prunella Scales, Russ Conway, Billy Cotton, the cast of Dixon of Dock Green, Dick Emery, Kenneth McKellar, Nina & Frederik, Terry Scott and Hugh Lloyd and Andy Stewart, with the Harry Rabinowitz orchestra.

=== 1964 Christmas Night with the Stars ===
Broadcast on Friday 25 December 1964. Jack Warner introduced The Barron Knights, The Black and White Minstrels, Roy Castle, Billy Cotton, Dick Emery, Benny Hill, Kathy Kirby, The Likely Lads with Rodney Bewes and James Bolam, Marriage Lines (as 1963), Meet the Wife with Freddie Frinton and Thora Hird, Terry Scott and Hugh Lloyd and Andy Stewart, with the Harry Rabinowitz orchestra.

=== 1967 Christmas Night with the Stars ===
Broadcast on Monday 25 December 1967. Rolf Harris introduced Cilla Black, Val Doonican, Billy Cotton, Roy Hudd, Lulu, David Nixon, Beryl Reid, Sandie Shaw, Kenneth Williams and Harry Worth with the casts of Beggar My Neighbour, Steptoe and Son and Till Death Us Do Part with the Alyn Ainsworth orchestra.

=== 1968 Christmas Night with the Stars ===
Broadcast on Wednesday 25 December 1968. Eric Morecambe and Ernie Wise introduced Louis Armstrong, Petula Clark, Rolf Harris, Jimmy Logan, Lulu, Kenneth McKellar, Nana Mouskouri, Cliff Richard, The Seekers and The Young Generation with excerpts from Ray Alan’s Ice Cabaret, Marty Feldman, Oh Brother, Not in Front of the Children, Dad's Army (see "Santa on Patrol") and Harry Worth. With the Alyn Ainsworth orchestra.

=== 1969 Christmas Night with the Stars ===
Broadcast on Thursday 25 December 1969. Val Doonican introduced Moira Anderson, Cilla Black, Roy Castle, Wendy Craig, Rolf Harris, Mary Hopkin, Lulu, Kenneth McKellar, Kenneth Williams, and The Young Generation. Choreography by Douglas Squires. Also featured:

- Dad's Army – Script by Jimmy Perry and David Croft, starring Arthur Lowe, John Le Mesurier and Clive Dunn, featuring John Laurie, James Beck, Arnold Ridley and Ian Lavender, with Bill Pertwee, Robert Aldous. Directed by David Croft.
- Dick Emery – with Peter Elliott. Script by Peter Robinson. Directed by Ernest Maxin.
- Marty – Written by Marty Feldman and Barry Took, starring Marty Feldman with John Junkin, Tim Brooke-Taylor and Roland MacLeod. Directed by Roger Race.
- Kenneth McKellar and Moira Anderson – Orchestra directed by Peter Knight. Directed by Yvonne Littlewood.
- Not in Front of the Children – by Richard Waring, starring Wendy Craig and Ronald Hines, with Hugo Keith-Johnston, Verena Greenlaw, Jill Riddick and Reginald Marsh. Directed by Graeme Muir.
- Monty Python's Flying Circus – Conceived, written and performed by John Cleese, Graham Chapman, Michael Palin, Terry Jones, Eric Idle, with Carol Cleveland. Animations by Terry Gilliam. Directed by Ian McNaughton.
- The Cliff Adams Singers – Orchestra directed by Ken Thorne. Script by Austin Steele, David Climie and Val Doonican. Graphics by Bernard Lodge. Design by Brian Tregidden. Associate producer Colin Charman. Produced by Terry Hughes.

=== 1970 Christmas Night with the Stars ===
Broadcast on Friday 25 December 1970 at 6:45pm. Introduced by Cilla Black. Special guests: Bob Hope, Mary Hopkin, Graham Kerr, Jerry Lewis, Nana Mouskouri, Clodagh Rodgers, Frank Sinatra, Jack Warner.

- Dad's Army – Script by Jimmy Perry and David Croft and starring Arthur Lowe, John Le Mesurier and Clive Dunn, featuring John Laurie, James Beck, Arnold Ridley and Ian Lavender with Bill Pertwee. Produced by David Croft.
- Stanley Baxter – Script by Ken Hoare. Produced by Roger Race.
- Dick Emery – Script by Warren & Singer and Gary Chambers. Produced by Colin Charman.
- Bachelor Father – Script by Richard Waring, starring Ian Carmichael with Pauline Yates, Ian Johnson, Briony McRoberts, Beverley Simons, Roland Pickering. Produced by Graeme Muir.
- Terry Scott and June Whitfield – Script by Dave Freeman and Ronnie Taylor. Produced by Peter Whitmore. Choreography by Irving Davies. Vocal backing by The Breakaways. Orchestra directed by Ronnie Hazlehurst. Designed by Vic Meredith. Associate producer James Moir. Produced by Michael Hurll.

=== 1971 Christmas Night with the Stars ===
Broadcast on Saturday 25 December 1971. Hosted by Ronnie Barker and Ronnie Corbett, with special guests Engelbert Humperdinck, Lulu, Vera Lynn, Harry Secombe, and The New Seekers. Also featuring contributions from Till Death Us Do Part, Bachelor Father, Dick Emery, The Young Generation, and Look: Mike Yarwood!

=== 1972 Christmas Night with the Stars ===
Broadcast on Monday 25 December 1972. Hosted by Ronnie Barker and Ronnie Corbett, with special guests Cilla Black, The Young Generation, Lulu, and The Breakaways. Also featuring contributions from The Goodies, The Liver Birds, Dad's Army, and Look: Mike Yarwood!

=== 1994 Christmas Night with the Stars ===
Broadcast on Tuesday 27 December 1994. Stephen Fry and Hugh Laurie hosted the show. Performers included Sandie Shaw, Vic and Bob, The Fast Show, Ronnie Corbett, Alan Partridge, Rab C. Nesbitt, Felix Dexter and Alexei Sayle.

=== 2003 Christmas Night with the Stars ===
Broadcast on Thursday 25 December 2003. Hosted by Michael Parkinson. Performers included The Kumars, Will Young, Jo Brand, Ricky Tomlinson, Victoria Beckham, Jon Culshaw and Ronnie Corbett.
