= Private Frazer =

- Dad's Army character
- John Laurie as Private Frazer
- First appearance: "The Man and the Hour"
- Last appearance: "Never Too Old"
- Created by: Jimmy Perry; David Croft
- Portrayed by: Television/Radio; John Laurie; 1975/76 Stage Show; Hamish Roughead; 2016 Film; Bill Paterson; 2019 Remakes; David Hayman

In-universe information
- Occupation: Philatelist shopkeeper (Series 1–2); Undertaker (Series 3–9)
- Relatives: Blodwen (niece)
- Affiliated with: Home Guard

Private James Frazer is a fictional Home Guard platoon member and undertaker, first portrayed by John Laurie in the BBC television sitcom Dad's Army. He is noted for his catchphrases "We're doomed!" and "Rubbish!"

== Characterisation ==
It is mentioned that Frazer was born in 1882 and is portrayed as a dour, trouble-stirring, exaggerating, wild-eyed Scottish undertaker (formerly the keeper of a philatelist's shop with a hobby of making coffins), who possesses a curious fascination with women who have "big, strong thighs." He hails from the "wild and lonely" Isle of Barra in the Outer Hebrides, an apparently desolate and bleak place that appears to have informed most of his pessimistic, dark tendencies.

It is stated that during the First World War, Frazer served as chief petty officer in the Royal Navy, and was a cook on board HMS Defiant (a fictional warship) during the Battle of Jutland. A fine marksman, he served as a member of the crew of a minesweeper, being responsible for shooting mines with a rifle from the ship. Following the First World War, he moved to Walmington-on-Sea, becoming the town's undertaker.

Private Frazer is a notoriously miserable and miserly soul, he is known for his bleak, pessimistic outlook on life. He makes no secret of his desire for increased rank and power within the platoon. To that end, Frazer is frequently negative and hyper-critical of his superior officers and their decisions, and clearly considers Captain Mainwaring, Sergeant Wilson and Lance Corporal Jones barely fit for command. When given any form of power, he becomes overconfident, arrogant, and tyrannical. A notable example of this is seen in the episode "If the Cap Fits...", when Frazer is given command of the platoon for a few days as an exercise in the difficulties of leadership.

Another example of Frazer letting authority go to his head was shown in the missing episode "A Stripe for Frazer". In the episode, Mainwaring is told he can make one of the members of the platoon up to a full corporal; rather than promote Lance Corporal Jones, he decides to temporarily promote Frazer to lance corporal instead, thinking that he can evaluate which of the two men would make the best corporal. Frazer's desire for power (and the beginning of his rivalry with Jones) leads to him filing numerous charges against nearly every member of the platoon, with Frazer exaggerating petty offences into serious charges to impress Mainwaring.

Frazer is somewhat two-faced, having a tendency to doubt people and their situations. In many instances, he will quickly cast doubt upon Mainwaring's plans, or the bravery of one of his fellow platoon members (usually the mild-mannered Godfrey). When the targets of his scorn manage to prove him wrong, Frazer will immediately ensure he is on the winning side of an argument; in these cases he will often make statements like "I never doubted ye for a second" to Mainwaring, or proclaim Godfrey to be "a man of steel, just like I've always said". His main rivalries are with the other ageing members in the platoon, notably Corporal Jones and Private Godfrey, though he has a more amenable relationship with Private Walker, who jokingly gives Frazer the nickname "Taffy" (a slang term for Welsh people, used by Walker as a playful dig at Frazer's Scottish heritage). Occasionally, Frazer does show a more generous side to his character, such as when he saves Private Godfrey's cottage from being demolished to make way for a runway, though in typical Frazer style, he does not let on that it was he who saved the cottage.

== Medals ==
Although Private Frazer rarely wore his ribbons he was awarded the usual trilogy of First World War campaign medals (commonly known as "Pip, Squeak and Wilfred"), (Note: The 1914–15 Star, the British War Medal and the Victory Medal, nicknamed Pip, Squeak and Wilfred after a trio of popular cartoon characters of the period.) as a Chief Petty Officer in the Royal Navy during the First World War, in addition to his Polar Medal for the Shackleton Expedition of 1904–1907.

== Other portrayals ==
John Laurie believed that taking part in the Dad's Army stage show would prove to be too exhausting for him, so the part of Frazer was played by Hamish Roughead in the 1975–76 stage production.

Bill Paterson played Frazer in the 2016 feature film, while David Hayman portrayed Private Frazer in Dad's Army: The Lost Episodes in 2019.
