= Private Walker =

- Dad's Army character
- Private Walker in "The Honourable Man" (1973), his penultimate onscreen appearance
- First appearance: "The Man and the Hour"
- Last appearance: "Things That Go Bump in the Night"
- Created by: Jimmy Perry; David Croft
- Portrayed by: Television; James Beck; Radio; James Beck; Graham Stark; Larry Martyn; 1975/76 Stage Show; John Bardon; 2007 Stage Show; Leslie Grantham; 2016 Film; Daniel Mays; 2019 Remakes; Mathew Horne

In-universe information
- Occupation: Black market spiv
- Relatives: Grandmother
- Affiliated with: Home Guard

Private Joe Walker is a fictional black market spiv (or "wholesales supplier", as he describes it) and Home Guard platoon member, first portrayed by James Beck in the British television sitcom Dad's Army. Appearing in the first six series, Walker was one of the seven primary characters in Dad's Army.

== Concept and creation ==
Scriptwriter Jimmy Perry originally intended to play the part of Private Walker himself, but was advised against it by his co-writer David Croft. The character was based on a spiv character created and performed by British comedian and actor Arthur English.

== Characterisation ==
A cockney, Walker was born in 1906, and raised in Plaistow, East London. He is the second-youngest member of the platoon, the youngest being Private Pike. A pleasant and amiable, if slightly shifty, personality, Walker is nevertheless a constant thorn in Captain Mainwaring's side, for he does not share Mainwaring's idealism. However, despite this, he is a good-natured man, who is loyal to his commanding officer and platoon comrades and is a valuable asset to the platoon. This is owing to his many black market "business" connections and his ability to mysteriously conjure up almost anything that, due to the war, has become rationed or is no longer available in the shops.

Possessing keen improvisational skills and cunning, Walker is usually responsible for getting the platoon out of the many scrapes they find themselves in. He is constantly on the lookout for opportunities to make a few bob, often attempting to sell black market supplies to his platoon comrades, and various influential people, often at high prices and from dubious sources. A ladies' man, Walker is seen with several girlfriends across the series; the most prominent of these is Shirley/Edith (played by Wendy Richard), who is seen in several episodes.

Walker is allergic to corned beef, which is why he has not been called up for the regular army, although it is generally assumed that he has found a way to dodge the rules. This allergy was revealed in the episode "The Loneliness of the Long Distance Walker", in which he was conscripted, only to be discharged when it was found that corned beef fritters were the only rations left for the soldiers to eat.

== Departure ==
Walker's final appearance was in the episode "Things That Go Bump in the Night". Beck had only completed the location filming for this episode, filmed some time before the studio recordings, when he fell ill and died on 6 August 1973. His character was last mentioned in the following episode, "The Recruit", in which it was explained that Walker had "gone up to the smoke" to "do a deal". However, the character survived the war, as he is seen attending the launch of Mainwaring's "I'm Backing Britain" campaign in a scene set in 1968 in the first episode.

Following Beck's death, war reporter Private Cheeseman, played by Talfryn Thomas, was brought into the series. He had previously made a cameo appearance in the episode "My British Buddy".

== Other portrayals ==
In the radio series of Dad's Army, Graham Stark took over the role of Walker following Beck's death until Larry Martyn was cast to portray Walker for the remaining radio series. John Bardon played Walker in the stage production from 1975–76.

Daniel Mays played Walker in the 2016 feature film, while Mathew Horne portrayed Walker in Dad's Army: The Lost Episodes in 2019.

== Reception ==
Co-writer Jimmy Perry approved of the casting of Beck: "He had the right mix of cheekiness and charm. He gave the role a bit of oomph."

Historian Mark Lewisohn wrote that, following Beck's death in 1973, "The subsequent series failed to match the brilliance of the earlier episodes, perhaps indicating how integral Beck's dodgy spiv character was to the mix."
