= Private Godfrey =

- Dad's Army character
- Arnold Ridley as Private Godfrey
- First appearance: "The Man and the Hour"
- Last appearance: "Never Too Old"
- Created by: Jimmy Perry; David Croft
- Portrayed by: Arnold Ridley; Michael Gambon (2016 film); Timothy West (2019 remakes)

In-universe information
- Full name: Charles Godfrey
- Occupation: Retired shop assistant/tailor
- Family: Lavinia (aunt); Elsie (aunt); Cissy Godfrey (sister); Dolly Godfrey (sister)
- Home: Cherry Tree Cottage, Walmington-on-Sea
- Nationality: British
- Affiliated with: Home Guard

Private Charles Godfrey MM is a fictional Home Guard soldier, first portrayed by Arnold Ridley in the British television sitcom Dad's Army. He is retired and was previously a tailor for the Civil Service Stores or the Army & Navy Stores. Godfrey was a conscientious objector during the First World War, yet he did work as a stretcher bearer with the Royal Army Medical Corps and earned a Military Medal for taking the wounded off the battle field at the Battle of the Somme. This has earned him great respect among the platoon members and resulted in him being appointed as the First Aid supervisor. Ridley himself fought at the Battle of the Somme during the First World War.

== Personality ==
Godfrey was born in 1871, and is a gentle, mild-mannered and kindly old gentleman, though more complex than at first evident. He is the only member of the platoon who has retired. In the episode "Branded" it is revealed that he was a conscientious objector in the First World War. This revelation initially makes him a pariah. However, during a training exercise, he risks his life to rescue Captain Mainwaring. Later, his sister reveals to the platoon that, far from avoiding service, he earned the Military Medal during the Battle of the Somme, where he served with distinction as a stretcher bearer with the Royal Army Medical Corps, and heroically saved several men's lives while under fire, an accomplishment he plays down modestly. This earns him the respect of the platoon, and leads to him being appointed as First Aid supervisor. Arnold Ridley actually served during the First World War with the Somerset Light Infantry, and fought in the Battle of the Somme, where he was severely wounded. These injuries gave a practical reason for his role: it was much easier for Ridley to carry the first aid bag than a heavy rifle.

Godfrey is a long-standing friend of Sergeant Wilson, and in the episode "High Finance" he lends Wilson a large sum of money when Mrs Pike is blackmailed by Hodges. He lives in picturesque Cherry Tree Cottage with his hard-of-hearing spinster sisters, Dolly and Cissy. He is clearly very fond of them, and often brings them up in conversation. When provisions are needed, his sister Dolly often provides upside-down cakes.

He is immensely loyal to Captain Mainwaring, who often feels quite guilty whenever he has criticised Godfrey:

Mainwaring: "If you're not fit for active service, perhaps you shouldn't come at all."
Godfrey: "I didn't want to disappoint you, sir."
Mainwaring: "Well done, Godfrey."

— from the episode "Everybody's Trucking"

He served for 35 years either as an assistant in the sports department of the Civil Service Stores (TV) or tailor and assistant in the Army & Navy Stores (radio).

Mainwaring: "Occupation?"
Godfrey: "I'm retired, but I was 25 years in the Civil Service."
Mainwaring: "Really? Indian or British?"
Godfrey: "Civil Service Stores."
Mainwaring: "Any previous military experience?"
Godfrey: "I was several years in the sports department. That meant archery and air guns."

— from the pilot episode "The Man and the Hour"

An aspect of his old age is his weak bladder, which lets him down and postpones all platoon activity, hence his catchphrase, "May I be excused, sir?", and his tendency to fall asleep can be similarly categorised: "I must have dropped off!".

== Medals ==
Although Private Godfrey rarely wore his ribbons, he was awarded the usual trio of First World War campaign medals (commonly known as "Pip, Squeak and Wilfred"), (Note: The 1914–15 Star, the British War Medal and the Victory Medal, nicknamed Pip, Squeak and Wilfred after a trio of cartoon characters of the period.) in addition to his Military Medal for bravery.

== Other portrayals ==
Private Godfrey is portrayed by Michael Gambon in the 2016 Dad's Army film.

Bernard Cribbins was set to portray him in a series of re-enactments of otherwise lost episodes of Dad's Army, but had to step away from the project for personal reasons, and was replaced by Timothy West.

== See also ==
- William Coltman, a stretcher bearer who served in the First World War, receiving the Victoria Cross for actions similar to those written into Private Godfrey's character.
- Charles Godfrey, a music hall entertainer in the 1880s and 1890s
