= James Beck =

English actor (1929–1973)

- James Beck as Private Walker in the Dad's Army episode "The Honourable Man" in 1973, just over a week before his collapse
- Born: Stanley James Carroll Beck; 21 February 1929; Islington, London, England
- Died: 6 August 1973 (aged 44); Roehampton, London, England
- Resting place: Putney Vale Cemetery, London, England
- Occupation: Actor
- Years active: 1961–1973
- Spouse: Kathleen Bullus (m. 1959)

Stanley James Carroll Beck (21 February 1929 – 6 August 1973) was an English television actor. He appeared in a number of programmes, but is best known for the role of Private Walker, a cockney spiv, in the BBC sitcom Dad's Army from the show's beginning in 1968 until his sudden death in 1973.

== Early life ==
Beck was born on 21 February 1929 in Islington, North London, and attended Popham Road Primary School.

After attending Saint Martin's School of Art and doing his national service as a physical training instructor in the British Army, Beck became an actor.

== Career ==
=== Theatre ===
In 1949, Beck made his career acting debut in Little Lambs Eat Ivy at the Granville Theatre, Ramsgate. and followed in Peace Comes to Peckham and Miranda, at the same venue later that year. In 1954, he starred in A Murder Has Been Arranged at Bridgwater Town Hall. He joined the 'Unicorn Players', and performed in seven different plays at the Palace Theatre, Paignton between 1955–1957. In January 1956 he played Doctor Brown in the thriller-farce Wanted - One Body, written and directed by Charles Dyer, at the Hippodrome theatre in Aldershot in Hampshire. From 1958 to 1967, he was a regular performer in many different plays at York Theatre Royal.

=== Film and television ===
He concentrated on television and his early broadcast roles included Charlie Bell in an episode of Dr Finlay's Casebook (Series 1 episode 4, "Conduct Unbecoming", 1962), and was cast as a policeman in a 1965 episode of Coronation Street, in a storyline concerning the collapse of a house and in a 1967 episode in a storyline concerning a train crash. He also appeared, uncredited, as a policeman in Gideon's Way (1965), and was often seen in TV drama, with one-off roles in series such as The Troubleshooters (1965, 1967, 1970) and in 1968, with Peter Cushing in the episode "The Blue Carbuncle", the BBC's Sherlock Holmes.

In 1968, he was offered the role of Private Walker in Dad's Army, originally written by Jimmy Perry for himself. Perry approved of the casting of Beck: "He had the right mix of cheekiness and charm. He gave the role a bit of oomph."

Always in demand, he continued to work on TV programmes including A Family at War (1970) and Romany Jones (1972–73), in which he played the lead character of Bert Jones. He also recorded a pilot for an uncommissioned series called Bunclarke With an E (1973), which was to be based on scripts originally written for Hancock's Half Hour and in which Arthur Lowe was also to appear.

== Death ==
By 1973, Beck had recorded five series of Dad's Army and had nearly finished working on the sixth, besides working on the radio series of the show. All of the location filming and studio recording for five of the planned seven episodes of Series Six had been completed when Beck suddenly fell ill while opening a school fête in aid of Guide Dogs for the Blind. He returned home and within an hour was taken to Queen Mary's Hospital, Roehampton suffering from pancreatitis. He died three weeks later of a combination of heart failure, renal failure, and pancreatitis. He was 44.

The last time Beck's Dad's Army co-stars saw him alive was on Friday 13 July 1973 at the Playhouse Theatre in London, where he recorded two radio episodes of Dad's Army, which ran alongside the TV series. The following afternoon Beck suddenly became ill.

His death was a great shock to his fellow cast members, as well as to Jimmy Perry and David Croft. Perry has said that heavy drinking was common in show business at the time, and that he paid little attention to Beck's habit until he "saw Jimmy’s legs and they were purple. It was the last episode he appeared in before he died".

As a result of the filming of exterior locations being completed before the studio filming, the character of Walker appears in the episode "Things That Go Bump in the Night" in exterior shots but not in studio shots. To explain Walker's eventual disappearance from the series, in the episode "The Recruit" (the series 6 finale), Mainwaring reads a note written by Walker apologising for his absence, as he has gone "up to the Smoke" (London) to conduct one of his deals. The character was not referenced again in the series.

== Filmography ==
=== Film ===
Year	Title	Role	Notes
1968	Star!	Drunken Soldier	Uncredited
1970	Groupie Girl	Brian	Released as I Am a Groupie in the United States
1970	Carry On Loving	Mr Roxby	Scenes deleted from final film
1971	Dad's Army	Private Walker	
1971	A Couple of Beauties	Sidney	Short
1973	Love Thy Neighbour	Cyril	

=== Television ===
Year	Title	Role	Episode
1961	Dixon of Dock Green	Various	6 episodes
1961	Deadline Midnight	Ambulance man	1 episode
1962	Dr. Finlay's Casebook	Charlie Bell	"Conduct Unbecoming"
1962	Z Cars	Constable	"The Five Whistles"
1963, 1966, 1972	Comedy Playhouse	Various characters	3 episodes
1964	Taxi!	Len Gladwin	5 episodes
1964–67	Coronation Street	Police Sergeant Bowden	6 episodes
1965	Gideon's Way	Police Inspector	"A Perfect Crime"
1966	All Gas and Gaiters	Policeman	"The Bishop Rides Again" (pilot)
1967	The Troubleshooters	Dave Candy	"Some Days You Just Can't Win"
1968	The Blue Carbuncle	James Ryder	
1968	Not in Front of the Children	Estate Agent	"Home Chat"
1968–73	Dad's Army	Private Walker	59 episodes
1969	Two in Clover	Dr. Molineux	
1970	Doctor in the House	Mr Wale	"What Seems to Be the Trouble"
1972	The Fenn Street Gang	Auctioneer	"Horse of the Year"
1972	Scoop	Corker	3 episodes
1972	My Wife Next Door	Mr Fielding	"Undesirable Residence"
1972–73	Romany Jones	Bert Jones	14 episodes

=== Radio ===
Year	Title	Role	Episode	Notes
1968	The Events at Black Tor	Sergeant	5 episodes	
1970, 1971	Brothers in Law	Fred Tanner, Newman	2 episodes	Beck played Fred Tanner in the first series (1970), and Newman in the second series (1971).
1971	Hush Hush, Here Comes the Bolshie Man		1 episode	A pilot episode recorded for Comedy Parade 1971.
1971, 1972	The Motorway Men	Steve	8 episodes + pilot	This program's pilot episode featured alongside Hush Hush, Here Comes the Bolshie Man on Comedy Parade 1971.
1973	Dad's Army	Private Walker	20 episodes	
