= Sergeant Wilson =

Fictional character from Dad's Army sitcom

- Dad's Army character
- First appearance: "The Man and the Hour"
- Last appearance: "Never Too Old"
- Portrayed by: John Le Mesurier; Bill Nighy (2016 film); Robert Bathurst (2019)

In-universe information
- Title: The Honourable
- Occupation: Bank Chief Clerk; Sergeant, Royal Artillery; Captain, Middlesex Regiment
- Relatives: Unnamed Ex-Wife; Unnamed Daughter; Frank Pike ("nephew"/son); Lettice (aunt)
- Affiliated with: Home Guard

Sergeant Arthur Wilson is a fictional Home Guard platoon sergeant and bank chief clerk, first portrayed by John Le Mesurier in the BBC television sitcom Dad's Army.

== Background ==
Wilson was born in 1887, and is carefree, cheerful and well-spoken, although more complex than he first seems. He is chief clerk of the Walmington-on-Sea bank and captain of the cricket club. He has an upper-middle-class background; his uncle was a peer of the realm, his father had a career in the City of London, and Wilson often recalls fond memories of his nanny. He was educated at a public school named Meadow Bridge, having failed the entrance exam for Harrow. He was destined for the Indian Civil Service but failed that exam too. The final episode reveals Wilson to have reached the rank of captain in the Middlesex Regiment whilst serving in the First World War.

Captain Mainwaring, Wilson's senior in the Home Guard and in the bank, envies and resents Wilson's privileged background and once compared Wilson with Peter Pan, because he could never face responsibilities. These include Private Pike, who worships his "Uncle Arthur" but may be Wilson's son – Wilson has had a long relationship with Mavis Pike, Pike's widowed mother. It is gossip in Walmington-on-Sea, as both arrived in Walmington from Weston-super-Mare around the same time, and there are other "coincidences" that show Wilson and Mrs Pike are more than just close friends, such as them unofficially living together. He admits that Pike originally called him Daddy, until told to call him Uncle (although the writers have confirmed that Wilson is Pike's biological father). In "Menace from the Deep" Jones brushes against Wilson while he is asleep, and he says without fully waking "Gently, Mavis".

Although Wilson is shown to have a very flirtatious nature, and Mrs Pike has on occasion been seen out with other men (such as Warden Hodges, or the dashing American Army soldiers that arrived in Walmington-on-Sea), their relationship seems to be enduring, with both Wilson and Mrs Pike expressing sincere distress during the various times when they believe the other has left them for someone else.

In "Getting the Bird" it is revealed that Wilson has an adult daughter from an early marriage whom he paid to attend a good school and who is serving during the war in the Women's Royal Naval Service. He admits to Fraser that he does not see his daughter as much as he would like, but it is clear that father and daughter love each other deeply. In "Sgt. Wilson's Little Secret" a misunderstanding leads to him nearly marrying Mrs Pike (indicating that he has divorced his previous wife) but he apparently calls it off at the last moment. There remain loose ends about Wilson's personal life, e.g. he may avoid marrying Mrs Pike because he does not want his previous marriage to become known, or he may never have been divorced from his wife, meaning a marriage to Mrs Pike would be bigamous.

In the post-war radio sequel It Sticks Out Half a Mile, Wilson claims to be 54 years old, and born in 1894. The radio sequel also reveals that he did become the manager of Swallows bank at Walmington-on-Sea in 1947. It also reveals that Mrs Pike moved over to the same location when Wilson is transferred.

== Personality ==
Wilson has a vague and dreamy personality and an aura of mystery. In appearance, he resembles Anthony Eden, and in the episode "Ring Dem Bells" loves to be told of his supposed resemblance to the actor Jack Buchanan (and is mocked for doing so by Mainwaring in the episode "The Love of Three Oranges"). He is a kind man, who goes with the flow of life. Wilson's dream-like manner is often mimicked by the platoon, mostly Privates Walker and Fraser, but the men like him, and some admire him (including Jones, Godfrey, and most of all Private Pike). Rather than bark orders as a sergeant would be expected to do, he asks "Would you mind awfully falling in, please?"

However, when pushed, a different Wilson emerges. In "High Finance", it is revealed that Warden Hodges has been forcing his attentions on Mrs Pike by blackmailing her with a rent increase; Wilson reacts by punching Hodges in the face, to the admiration of Mrs Pike and Frank. Wilson is the only member of the platoon to be physically violent, as in "Absent Friends" when Pike, Jones, Fraser, Walker and Mainwaring attempt to subdue three IRA members and are beaten, Wilson defeats them singlehanded with only bruised knuckles to show for it.

In social settings, Wilson is effortlessly charming, often to the frustration of Mainwaring (who is the exact opposite of Wilson in these situations), especially as many of the people Mainwaring is hoping to impress are people Wilson already knows quite well. Wilson even manages to charm Mrs. Mainwaring (albeit over the telephone, as she is never seen on screen), telling her "we understand him, don't we" in reference to her husband.

When it comes to women, Wilson is especially debonair, effortlessly flirting and attracting the attention of women, often to the exasperation of Mainwaring, who detests Wilson's flirtatious manner (such as when he is flirting with Mainwaring's nurse, some of the ladies signing up to join the Home Guard, or even the young woman serving drinks at a social event). In the episode "Man Hunt", Wilson asks an attractive young woman to let him come in and look at her knickers, when it is suspected they may have been made of material from a German pilot's parachute (as a result of one of Walker's many black market schemes); in response to this request, the young woman eagerly agrees and invites Wilson inside. This prompts Walker (who was forced to remain outside with Mainwaring after the young woman invited Wilson inside) to remark to Mainwaring about the "extraordinary influence" Wilson has over women. Mainwaring replies that he is getting a little bored with his sergeant's peccadilloes.

Wilson's charm is not limitless, however; in the episode "The Two and a Half Feathers", Wilson clashes several times with one of the serving ladies during lunch at the British Restaurant; the serving lady is clearly unimpressed with Wilson's upper-class manner of speech (calling it "lah-de-dah talk"), and even referring to Wilson as a "capitalist lackey" when he leaves his dirty dishes behind for her to gather up.

== Relationship with Mainwaring ==
Tension and comedy between Wilson and Mainwaring is heightened by their difference in social class: Wilson had an upper middle class childhood and a public school education, prompting resentment from the lower middle class Mainwaring, who had to work his way up and views Wilson as having had it easy. Mainwaring frequently emphasises his superior rank at the bank and in the Home Guard to maintain his authority and superiority over Wilson. Wilson undermines his superior through casual charm and frequent concern at Mainwaring's plans, querying, "Do you really think that's wise, sir?"

The contrasts are established in several ways: as a civilian, Mainwaring wears a bowler hat while Wilson wears a more fashionable Anthony Eden hat. In "The Honourable Man", Wilson became "The Honourable Arthur Wilson" after an uncle who was a peer dies. Mainwaring tried to stay at the centre of attention; Wilson detested his new style and the unwelcome attention it brought him and refused to use his title, which only infuriated Mainwaring more, as he believed one should revel in titles of nobility rather than be ashamed of them.

Conflict between the two reaches a head in "A. Wilson (Manager)?", in which Wilson is promoted as manager of another branch and also to second lieutenant in a neighbouring Home Guard Unit. Wilson finds out that he would have been promoted long ago if Mainwaring had not told his superiors that he was unsuitable for promotion. Mainwaring's resentment of Wilson's breeding is revealed. Wilson's new branch is bombed, so he has to return to Walmington. His sign, "A. WILSON, manager", is among the debris. Mainwaring's first concern is to let Wilson know that GHQ is allowing him to keep his rank. Wilson is glad until Mainwaring throws him the sergeant's stripes.

Wilson thinks Mainwaring a pompous fool; in "A. Wilson (Manager)?", Wilson reminds Mainwaring that when he first wore his captain's uniform, he saw him walking up and down the high street all afternoon trying to find someone to salute him, but he had to make do with a sea scout troop. However, they remain friends. In the episode "Room at the Bottom", Wilson was told that Mainwaring had not been commissioned a captain's position, and was gleeful when he was told thus Mainwaring would be demoted. Wilson provides a more realistic and down-to-earth appraisal of a situation than Mainwaring, who is blinded by pomposity and patriotism, as demonstrated in this exchange:

Mainwaring: They'll never get through the Maginot Line.
Wilson: Haven't you heard... They went around the side.
Mainwaring: That's a typical shabby Nazi trick!

Mainwaring also routinely comments on Wilson's private life, specifically his relationship with Mrs Pike and her son (and their underling at the bank and fellow platoon member) Frank. Mainwaring often chastises Wilson to handle either Mrs Pike or Frank whenever they cause problems for him (usually revolving around Mrs. Pike's complaints to Mainwaring of how he treats her son, who she views as overly delicate). Wilson's response to this is usually a mix of nonchalance and exasperation, though in the episode "War Dance", he finally displays his irritation at Mainwaring's butting into his personal life; when Mainwaring refers to him as "Peter Pan" due to his reluctance to act as a father figure to Pike, Wilson drops his normal air of deference to his boss and platoon leader, and angrily replies "My god, Mainwaring, you can hit pretty low when it suits you!"

Despite their conflicts, however, Wilson and Mainwaring do share a respectful, if somewhat formal, sort of friendship. In the episode "Something Nasty in the Vault", Wilson and Mainwaring are trapped in the vault of their bank, desperately cradling an unexploded German bomb. During this time, they bond over their shared danger; at one point Mainwaring even scratches Wilson's nose for him when he develops a maddening itch.

Likewise, in the episode "Keep Young and Beautiful", when presented with the possibility that some of the members of their platoon may be reassigned to the ARP due to their age, Wilson points out to Mainwaring that he has no wish to leave the platoon and is actually very proud of what the two of them have achieved. On several occasions, Mainwaring informs Wilson that he considers him not just his subordinate (at both the bank and the platoon), but also a friend.

In the final episode, Wilson turns up at the wedding of Jones and Mrs Fox in a captain's uniform, having achieved the rank during the First World War. He is modest about it (in the first episode Wilson claims to have been a sergeant in the Royal Artillery serving at Mons, Passchendaele and Gallipoli) and Mainwaring is pleasantly surprised – although he insisted that "it doesn't change anything, you know."

== Medals ==
Although Sergeant Wilson rarely wore his ribbons, he was awarded the usual trilogy of First World War campaign medals (commonly known as "Pip, Squeak and Wilfred"), (Note: The 1914–15 Star, the British War Medal and the Victory Medal, nicknamed Pip, Squeak and Wilfred after a trio of cartoon characters of the period,) which he had previously been awarded as a captain in the First World War.

== Other portrayals ==
In the feature film Dad's Army released in 2016, Wilson is played by Bill Nighy.

Wilson is played by Robert Bathurst in a series of re-enactments of otherwise lost episodes of Dad's Army.
