= List of Dad's Army radio episodes =

Dad's Army is a British television sitcom that was broadcast from 1968 to 1977. From 1974 to 1976, a radio version was broadcast on BBC Radio 4. It was written by Harold Snoad and Michael Knowles, based on the scripts of the television episodes written by Jimmy Perry and David Croft, and was produced by John Dyas. A total of 67 radio episodes of Dad's Army across three series were broadcast on BBC Radio 4 from 28 January 1974 to 7 July 1976. The first series consisted of twenty-one episodes, including a Christmas special, and aired in 1974. The second series aired in 1975 and ran for twenty episodes. The third and final series, consisting of twenty-six episodes, was broadcast in 1976.

The series starred Arthur Lowe as Captain Mainwaring, John Le Mesurier as Sergeant Wilson, Clive Dunn as Lance Corporal Jones, John Laurie as Private Frazer, Arnold Ridley as Private Godfrey and Ian Lavender as Private Pike; all portrayed the same characters in the television series. However, only Lowe, Le Mesurier and Dunn appeared in every episode, as having each member of the cast in every episode was deemed unnecessary by the BBC radio department. All members of the main cast appeared from the second series onwards. The role of Private Walker was initially played by James Beck (who also played Walker in the television version), until his death in 1973. Graham Stark took over the role until Larry Martyn was cast as a permanent replacement. Janet Davies, who played Mrs Pike in the television series, was not asked to appear in the radio series, being replaced by Pearl Hackney.

Although most of the eighty television episodes were adapted to radio, the following were not: "Gorilla Warfare", "Ring Dem Bells", "When You've Got to Go", "Come in, Your Time is Up", "The Face on the Poster", "My Brother and I", "The Love of Three Oranges", "Wake Up Walmington", "The Making of Private Pike", "Knights of Madness", "The Miser's Hoard", "Number Engaged" and "Never Too Old". Only one Dad's Army sketch broadcast as part of the BBC's Christmas Night with the Stars programme, "Broadcast to the Empire", was adapted for radio. The remaining three, "Santa on Patrol", "Resisting the Aggressor Down the Ages" and "Cornish Floral Dance", were not adapted for radio, although the Cornish Floral Dance's titular dance replaced the Morris dancing sequence in the radio adaptation of "The Godiva Affair". As the radio series ended before the ninth television series had aired in 1977, all episodes from the ninth series were not adapted; the remaining episodes were not adapted because they were deemed too visual. Some episode titles were changed from their television equivalents at the request of the producer, in order to sound more concise.

All episodes were recorded in mono; early episodes were recorded at the Playhouse Theatre, while the rest of the episodes were recorded at the Paris Studios in London. John Snagge was the announcer for each episode. A technical team composed of Eric Young, John Whitehall and Ian Richardson assisted Dyas with production.

== Series overview ==
Series	Episodes	Originally released		Average listeners (millions)
Series	Episodes	First released	Last released	Average listeners (millions)
1	21	28 January 1974	25 December 1974	0.9
2	20	11 February 1975	24 June 1975	1.0
3	26	16 March 1976	7 July 1976	0.7

== Series 1 (1974) ==
No. overall	No. in series	Title	Recorded	Original release date	U.K. listeners (millions)
1	1	"The Man and the Hour"	3 June 1973	28 January 1974	0.9
2	2	"Museum Piece"	7 June 1973	4 February 1974	0.9
Arnold Ridley does not appear in this episode.
3	3	"Command Decision"	21 June 1973	11 February 1974	0.6
Arnold Ridley and Ian Lavender do not appear in this episode.
4	4	"The Enemy Within the Gates"	21 June 1973	18 February 1974	1.0
John Laurie does not appear in this episode.
5	5	"The Battle of Godfrey's Cottage"	6 July 1973	25 February 1974	1.1
James Beck does not appear in this episode.
6	6	"The Armoured Might of Lance Corporal Jones"	6 July 1973	4 March 1974	0.9
Arnold Ridley and Ian Lavender do not appear in this episode.
7	7	"Sgt. Wilson's Little Secret"	13 July 1973	11 March 1974	1.3
John Laurie does not appear in this episode.
8	8	"A Stripe for Frazer"	13 July 1973	18 March 1974	1.0
This was the final episode to feature Private Walker as portrayed by James Beck, who died soon after recording it. Walker would appear later in the series, portrayed by Graham Stark, following Beck's death.
9	9	"Operation Kilt"	13 July 1973	25 March 1974	1.3
10	10	"Battle School"	28 June 1973	1 April 1974	1.0
Although it was recorded before James Beck's death, his character does not appear in this episode.
11	11	"Under Fire"	27 July 1973	8 April 1974	0.8
Ian Lavender does not appear in this episode.
12	12	"Something Nasty in the Vault"	23 July 1973	15 April 1974	0.7
Arnold Ridley does not appear in this episode.
13	13	"The Showing Up of Corporal Jones"	20 July 1973	22 April 1974	1.2
This is the first episode to feature Graham Stark as Private Walker.
14	14	"The Loneliness of the Long Distance Walker"	20 July 1973	29 April 1974	0.9
Ian Lavender does not appear in this episode.
15	15	"Sorry, Wrong Number"	27 July 1973	6 May 1974	1.0
The television equivalent is titled "The Lion Has Phones". Arnold Ridley does not appear in this episode.
16	16	"The Bullet is Not for Firing"	26 July 1973	13 May 1974	1.0
John Laurie and Ian Lavender do not appear in this episode. This is the final episode to feature Graham Stark as Private Walker. The character does not appear again until the Christmas special "Present Arms".
17	17	"Room at the Bottom"	23 July 1973	20 May 1974	0.7
Ian Lavender does not appear in this episode.
18	18	"Menace from the Deep"	24 July 1973	27 May 1974	0.6
Arnold Ridley does not appear in this episode.
19	19	"No Spring for Frazer"	26 July 1973	3 June 1974	1.0
Ian Lavender does not appear in this episode.
20	20	"Sons of the Sea"	25 July 1973	10 June 1974	0.9
Christmas Special
21	21	"Present Arms"	18 July 1974	25 December 1974	0.7
This episode, which features the first appearance of Larry Martyn as Private Walker, was recorded at the end of the recording block for the second series; the earliest episodes of that series do not feature Walker. Therefore, Walker only appears again from the eighth episode, "A Brush with the Law", onwards. The television equivalent is two episodes, titled "Battle of the Giants!" and "Shooting Pains".

== Series 2 (1975) ==
No. overall	No. in series	Title	Recorded	Original release date	U.K. listeners (millions)
22	1	"Don't Forget the Diver"	16 July 1974	11 February 1975	1.1
23	2	"If the Cap Fits..."	17 April 1974	18 February 1975	1.0
24	3	"Put That Light Out!"	30 April 1974	25 February 1975	0.9
25	4	"Boots, Boots, Boots"	16 April 1974	4 March 1975	1.1
26	5	"Sgt – Save My Boy!"	16 April 1974	11 March 1975	0.9
27	6	"Branded"	17 July 1974	18 March 1975	1.1
28	7	"Uninvited Guests"	18 April 1974	25 March 1975	0.9
29	8	"A Brush with the Law"	17 July 1974	1 April 1975	1.0
This episode marks the second appearance of Larry Martyn as Private Walker; the actor portrays the character until the series' end, although he does not appear in selected episodes.
30	9	"A Soldier's Farewell"	15 May 1974	8 April 1975	1.4
31	10	"Brain Versus Brawn"	30 April 1974	15 April 1975	0.8
32	11	"War Dance"	12 May 1974	22 April 1975	1.2
33	12	"Mum's Army"	12 May 1974	29 April 1975	0.7
34	13	"Getting the Bird"	15 July 1974	6 May 1975	0.9
35	14	"Don't Fence Me In"	16 May 1974	13 May 1975	0.9
36	15	"The King Was in His Counting House"	15 May 1974	20 May 1975	1.2
37	16	"When Did You Last See Your Money?"	15 May 1974	27 May 1975	0.7
Larry Martyn does not appear in this episode.
38	17	"Fallen Idol"	16 July 1974	3 June 1975	0.9
Larry Martyn does not appear in this episode.
39	18	"A. Wilson (Manager)?"	17 April 1974	10 June 1975	0.9
Larry Martyn does not appear in this episode.
40	19	"All is Safely Gathered In"	15 July 1974	17 June 1975	0.8
Larry Martyn does not appear in this episode.
41	20	"The Day the Balloon Went Up"	18 April 1974	24 June 1975	0.9
Larry Martyn does not appear in this episode.

== Series 3 (1976) ==
No. overall	No. in series	Title	Recorded	Original release date	U.K. listeners (millions)
42	1	"A Man of Action"	28 April 1975	16 March 1976	0.8
43	2	"The Honourable Man"	28 April 1975	23 March 1976	0.7
44	3	"The Godiva Affair"	5 May 1975	30 March 1976	0.7
45	4	"Keep Young and Beautiful"	12 May 1975	6 April 1976	0.7
46	5	"Absent Friends"	6 May 1975	13 April 1976	0.7
47	6	"Round and Round Went the Great Big Wheel"	7 May 1975	20 April 1976	0.6
48	7	"The Great White Hunter"	30 May 1975	27 April 1976	0.6
The television equivalent is titled "Man Hunt".
49	8	"The Deadly Attachment"	30 April 1975	4 May 1976	0.8
50	9	"Things That Go Bump in the Night"	7 May 1975	11 May 1976	0.7
51	10	"My British Buddy"	6 May 1975	18 May 1976	0.7
52	11	"Big Guns"	5 May 1975	25 May 1976	0.8
53	12	"The Big Parade"	2 May 1975	1 June 1976	0.8
54	13	"Asleep in the Deep"	9 May 1975	8 June 1976	0.5
55	14	"We Know Our Onions"	8 May 1975	15 June 1976	0.7
56	15	"The Royal Train"	29 April 1975	22 June 1976	0.7
57	16	"A Question of Reference"	12 May 1975	29 June 1976	0.5
The television equivalent is titled "The Desperate Drive of Corporal Jones".
58	17	"High Finance"	27 June 1975	6 July 1976	0.7
59	18	"The Recruit"	1 May 1975	13 July 1976	0.6
60	19	"A Jumbo-Sized Problem"	18 June 1975	20 July 1976	0.7
The television equivalent is titled "Everybody's Trucking".
61	20	"The Cricket Match"	1 May 1975	27 July 1976	0.5
The television equivalent is titled "The Test".
62	21	"Time on My Hands"	29 April 1975	3 August 1976	0.9
63	22	"Turkey Dinner"	2 May 1975	10 August 1976	0.7
64	23	"The Captain's Car"	9 May 1975	17 August 1976	0.7
65	24	"The Two and a Half Feathers"	8 May 1975	24 August 1976	0.9
66	25	"Is There Honey Still for Tea?"	11 July 1975	31 August 1976	0.8
Larry Martyn does not appear in this episode.
67	26	"Ten Seconds from Now"	18 June 1975	7 September 1976	0.9
The television equivalent is titled "Broadcast to the Empire".
