= List of Dad's Army audio releases =

The following is a list of audio releases for the British television and radio sitcom Dad's Army. The list includes cassette tape, compact disc, LP record and 7-inch single vinyl releases.

== LP ==
- Dad's Army, BBC Records, 1975. Contained the radio series episodes "Something Nasty in the Vault" and "Sgt. Wilson's Little Secret".

== Volume releases ==
Since 1990, the BBC has been releasing the original radio episodes. Initially, they were released on cassette tape only, but later they were released on cassette and CD together. Below is a list of all the CD and cassette releases, up to date.

- Volume 1: A Jumbo-Sized Problem

- Ten Seconds from Now
- A Jumbo-Sized Problem
- When Did You Last See Your Money?
- Time on My Hands

- Volume 2: Command Decision

- The Man and the Hour
- Museum Piece
- Command Decision
- The Enemy Within the Gates

- Volume 3: A Stripe for Frazer

- The Honourable Man
- High Finance
- The Battle of Godfrey's Cottage
- A Stripe for Frazer

- Volume 4: Sergeant Wilson's Little Secret

- The Armoured Might of Lance Corporal Jones
- Sergeant Wilson's Little Secret
- Operation Kilt
- Battle School

- Volume 5: Sorry Wrong Number

- Something Nasty in the Vault
- The Showing Up of Corporal Jones
- The Loneliness of the Long Distance Walker
- Sorry Wrong Number

- Volume 6: The Menace from the Deep

- Under Fire
- The Bullet is Not for Firing
- Room at the Bottom
- Menace from the Deep

- Volume 7: Don't Forget the Diver

- Don't Forget the Diver
- If the Cap Fits...
- A Brush with the Law
- Getting the Bird

- Volume 8: My British Buddy

- The King Was in His Counting House
- The Godiva Affair
- The Deadly Attachment
- My British Buddy

- Volume 9: A Man of Action

- The Day the Balloon Went Up
- Branded
- Round and Round Went the Great Big Wheel
- A Man of Action

- Volume 10: A Soldier's Farewell

- A Soldier's Farewell
- All is Safely Gathered In
- The Big Parade
- Asleep in the Deep

- Volume 11: Put That Light Out

- Put That Light Out!
- Sergeant - Save My Boy!
- Uninvited Guests
- Fallen Idol

- Volume 12: Absent Friends

- No Spring for Frazer
- Sons of the Sea
- Brain Versus Brawn
- Absent Friends

From this point on, all releases were released on both cassette and CD.

- Volume 13: Mum's Army

- Boots, Boots, Boots
- War Dance
- Mum's Army
- Don't Fence Me In

- Volume 14: Big Guns

- A. Wilson (Manager)?
- The Great White Hunter
- Things That Go Bump in the Night
- Big Guns

- Volume 15: We Know Our Onions

- We Know Our Onions
- The Royal Train
- A Question of Reference
- The Recruit

- Volume 16: Keep Young and Beautiful

- Keep Young and Beautiful
- The Captain's Car
- The Two and a Half Feathers
- Turkey Dinner

- Christmas Special: Present Arms

- Present Arms

== Collections ==
In 2003 and 2004, the BBC released three CD collections one for each series. Priced around £80.

- Dad's Army: Collector's Edition – Series 1
- Dad's Army: Collector's Edition – Series 2
- Dad's Army: Collector's Edition – Series 3

== Music only ==
=== LP ===
Dad's Army – Original Cast Recording, Warner K56186, 1976. The original cast recording of the stage show.

=== 7" singles ===
Who Do You Think You're Kidding, Mr. Hitler?, PYE 7N 17854, 1969
A side: Who Do You Think You're Kidding, Mr. Hitler (Dad's Army Theme), Bud Flanagan.
B side: It Ain't Gonna Rain on Me Mo!, Bernard Bedford & Chorus
The theme song recording was reissued in 1975.

Dad's Army March / What Did You Do in the War?, Columbia DB8766, 1971
Released for Christmas 1971 following the release of the film. Both tracks were performed by the Dad's Army Choir comprising Arthur Lowe, John Le Mesurier, Clive Dunn, John Laurie, James Beck, Arnold Ridley and Ian Lavender. The Dad's Army March was included in the film but without lyrics. What Did You Do in the War? includes solo parts by each member accompanied by the chorus.

We Stood Alone / Down Our Way, Columbia DB8952, 1972
Both tracks were credited to the Dad's Army Choir comprising Arthur Lowe, John Le Mesurier, Clive Dunn, John Laurie, James Beck, Arnold Ridley, Ian Lavender and Bill Pertwee.

=== CD ===
- Who Do You Think You Are Kidding Mr. Hitler?, River Records RRCD13/PT, 2001. Music from the TV series performed by various wartime artists, including the series theme performed by Bud Flanagan.
- Dads Army: Music From The Television Series, various artists, 2005, CD41 label, catalogue number CD41010
