= The Godiva Affair =

- Dad's Army episode
- Episode no.: Series 7 Episode 4
- Directed by: David Croft
- Story by: Jimmy Perry and David Croft
- Original air date: 6 December 1974
- Running time: 30 minutes

Episode chronology
← Previous "Gorilla Warfare"	Next → "The Captain's Car"

"The Godiva Affair" is the fourth episode of the seventh series of the British comedy series Dad's Army. It was originally transmitted on Friday 6 December 1974.

== Synopsis ==
As the town is still £2,000 short of the sum it requires for the purchase of a Spitfire, the platoon decide to drum up support by performing a morris dance at the fund-raising carnival. It is the identity of the Lady Godiva figure, however, that ends up grabbing most people's attention.

== Plot ==
The platoon are practising their morris dance in the church hall. Mainwaring notices that Corporal Jones is not his usual self. A few minutes later, Jones asks for a heart to heart with Mainwaring. He reveals that his paramour, the widowed Mrs Fox, has become involved with another man, Mr Gordon the town clerk, who Sergeant Wilson describes as "a bald-headed old duffer", much to Mainwaring's annoyance. Jones implores his commander to do something about it.

Reluctantly, Mainwaring agrees to meet with Mrs Fox in the Marigold Tea Rooms. Unfortunately, a large portion of the platoon is crowded into the cafe to watch, sensing a scandalous affair. Mainwaring is distinctly embarrassed by the whole thing; he is clearly made uncomfortable by the overly forward Mrs Fox, who he describes as a "flashy woman".

Mainwaring tries to speak to her on Jones' behalf, but when he subtly refers to a new bald-headed admirer, she assumes he means himself – and in the process mistakenly believes he is trying to proposition her. She offers to let Mainwaring have Tuesdays and Thursdays, whilst letting Jones have Mondays and Fridays. When a shocked Mainwaring points out he is talking about Mr Gordon, she says "he can have Wednesdays". The whole meeting leads to speculation through the town that the two are involved, rumours which reach the ears of Mrs Mainwaring.

The same evening, Mainwaring is giving a lecture in the office, when they become curious about what is happening in the adjoining church hall. They enter to find the Vicar, Verger, Warden Hodges and Town Clerk are holding trials for a Lady Godiva to ride at the head of the coming Spitfire Fund procession. While Mainwaring is outraged and appalled, Hodges tells him not to be so 'Victorian'. Mrs Fox meanwhile persuades Mr Gordon to use his influence to allow her to play the part.

The choice of Mrs Fox causes quite some consternation amongst the womenfolk of the town. Mrs Pike for instance berates Wilson for allowing this to happen, noting she is "much slimmer" than Mrs Fox, while Mrs Mainwaring, clearly suspicious her husband is conducting some sort of affair with Mrs Fox, constantly rings him at the bank and church hall demanding to know why she has not been chosen to play the part. Meanwhile, Jones is distraught, convinced he has now lost Mrs Fox to Mr Gordon.

On the day of the procession, the platoon are readying themselves for their morris dance. At that moment a tearful Mrs Fox arrives and falls into the arms of Jones, explaining that somebody has stolen the Lady Godiva costume from her at the town hall. Frazer disappointedly notes that they will not get to see a Lady Godiva after all.

Just then, Pike announces that a Godiva is going down the high street. It is assumed that Mrs Pike has stolen the costume and Mainwaring chides Wilson "can't you keep that woman under control?". However, when he looks out the window and sees that it is instead Mrs Mainwaring who has taken the part, a shocked and distraught Mainwaring faints into Jones' arms.

== Cast ==
- Arthur Lowe as Captain Mainwaring
- John Le Mesurier as Sergeant Wilson
- Clive Dunn as Lance Corporal Jones
- John Laurie as Private Frazer
- Arnold Ridley as Private Godfrey
- Ian Lavender as Private Pike
- Bill Pertwee as ARP Warden Hodges
- Frank Williams as The Vicar
- Edward Sinclair as The Verger
- Janet Davies as Mrs Pike
- Pamela Cundell as Mrs Fox
- Talfryn Thomas as Private Cheeseman
- Colin Bean as Private Sponge
- George Hancock as Private Hancock
- Peter Honri as Private Day
- Eric Longworth as Town Clerk
- Rosemary Faith as Waitress

== Notes ==
1. This episode is based around the legend of Lady Godiva who rode through the streets of Medieval Coventry, by having someone ride through the streets of Walmington clad only in a body-suit.
2. The platoon's morris dancing and the Godiva procession are to raise money for the Spitfire Fund. A common trend at the time was for towns to raise enough cash to construct a Spitfire.
3. The whole platoon, despite never having seen Mrs. Mainwaring before (except Wilson), recognise her as Lady Godiva. This might imply that the platoon have seen Mrs. Mainwaring in public previously since Mum's Army. As throughout the series, she never appears in person.

== Radio version ==
In the radio adaptation of this episode, first broadcast 30 March 1976, the platoon's Morris dance is replaced with the Cornish Floral Dance from the TV sketch of the same name.

Mrs Fox is played by Mollie Sugden. Mr Gordon is renamed Mr Upton and played by Julian Orchard. Private Walker is also featured, rather than Private Cheeseman, and is played by Larry Martyn.
