= Present Arms (Dad's Army radio episode) =

- Dad's Army episode
- Episode no.: Series 1 Episode 21
- Written by: Harold Snoad; Michael Knowles
- Original air date: 24 December 1974
- Running time: 60 minutes

Episode chronology
← Previous "Sons of the Sea"	Next → "Don't Forget the Diver"

"Present Arms" is the first episode of the second BBC Radio 4 series of the British television sitcom Dad's Army. It was originally broadcast on 24 December 1974, as a Christmas Special. "Present Arms" was compiled for radio from two television episodes, "Battle of the Giants!" and "Shooting Pains", and ran for a duration of 60 minutes, twice the length of a normal radio episode.

== Synopsis ==
As the season of goodwill approaches, Captain Mainwaring and his men use their rifles and their wits in a no-holds-barred contest with Captain Square and the Eastgate Platoon. The prize is the honour of guarding a very important person. But in the end it is the ingenuity of Private Walker which saves the day.

== Plot ==
It's December 1941 and while Corporal Jones and the rest of the platoon hold a very noisy bayonet practice, Captain Mainwaring and Sergeant Wilson are doing paperwork and are discussing the upcoming Ceremonial church parade of all the Home Guard platoons in the area. Mainwaring receives a new officer's cap in the post and hangs it on a nail on the door. Unfortunately, while charging at the bayonet dummy, Private Pike puts his bayonet through the door, and also Mainwaring's new hat. Mainwaring is incensed and shouts at Pike, calling him "a stupid boy" while Wilson receives a telephone call from Mrs Mainwaring. He hands the phone to Mainwaring, claiming she heard him shouting. Mainwaring is forced to leave to return his bedding to the air-raid shelter, leaving Wilson to dismiss the parade.

Shortly afterwards, Captain Square from the Eastgate platoon arrives unexpectedly and goes into the office and confronts Wilson about a note he sent about the ceremonial parade, a battalion order which stated that all medals should be worn. Wilson finds the note hidden in a drawer, and Square surmises that the reason he hid the letter is because Mainwaring hasn't got any medals, and he didn't want to feel out of place. Square orders Wilson to read the letter to the platoon.

Before the next parade the following evening, Mainwaring tells Wilson that he has received a letter from HQ Southern Command saying that the platoon, as the first one formed in the area, will be escorting the Prime Minister in a tour of local coastal defences. Mainwaring is very excited, implying the honour is based on his reputation, but Wilson points out that it's only because they were the first platoon in the area. Mainwaring inspects the men, and is shocked to see that they are all wearing their medals (except for Pike who has been forced, by his mum, to wear his Scouting merit badges instead). He riles Wilson about the unimportance of medals, and then is even more disgusted when he learns that Chief Air Raid Precautions (ARP) Warden Hodges also has medals.

Before the ceremonial parade the platoon gather in the church hall, but Mainwaring appears in civvies, saying that his wife has sent his uniform to the dry cleaners by mistake. At which point Private Pike comes in with the uniform which he happened to see while collecting his own dry cleaning on the way home from the bank. Mainwaring tries his best to avoid wearing it only to be foiled by his well-meaning platoon. Private Frazer says that the Captain deserves a medal "for sheer cunning".

After the parade, the platoon gather in the pub, along with Square and Hodges. There is jovial humour before an argument breaks out about between Mainwaring and Square. This leads to Mainwaring letting it slip about his platoon being offered the prime ministerial escort duty, of which Square is obviously unaware.

At the next parade, Mainwaring lets the platoon know about the escort duty. He also tells them that there will be further shooting practice following the poor showing at the previous session. In the office after the parade, Mainwaring and Wilson are interrupted by Brigadier Bell. It appears that Square has complained about Mainwaring's platoon getting the escort detail, and that the fairest way of resolving the issue would be a competition to decide which platoon would provide the escort. The format of the competition was as yet undecided.

A few days letter, Private Walker joins the captain and the sergeant in the office, with a letter from Brigadier Bell. It informs them that the competition will consist of two parts. The first will be map reading, for which there will need to be a flag for the platoon which can be raised at the destination in the map exercise. As they don't have a flag already, Walker says he can provide one (for a fee!). They then read that the other part will be a shooting competition, which leads Mainwaring to conclude they have already lost following the previous poor showing.

At this point Mrs Pike enters and Wilson explains the revised situation with the escort. Walker invites everyone to come to the hippodrome that evening to see the variety performance by "Cheerful" Charlie Cheeseman, a variety entertainer, to raise their spirits. Reluctantly, Wilson and Mainwaring attend – though Mrs Mainwaring won't as she hasn't smiled since "Munich". At the performance, Cheeseman is performing some inappropriate jokes and performing some songs. Wilson is asleep and Mainwaring is not enjoying it at all. Cheeseman announces the next act – The Great Alberto – who is a non-English-speaking Italian trick sharpshooter, who performs some amazing feats of shooting. Wilson comments that with shooting like that, he should be in the Home Guard. Walker goes to see Alberto after the performance, discovering he isn't Italian but is from Wigan and his real name is Bert Postlethwaite. He says he has a proposition for Postlethwaite.

At the church hall next morning Mainwaring and Wilson have been summoned by Walker who has recruited a new platoon member – one Bert Postlethwaite. Walker has "recruited" him to take part in the shooting range competition. Despite initial concerns Mainwaring agrees to let Albert take part "for the honour of the platoon".

We cut to the competition and after the first round, it's neck and neck between the platoons. Unfortunately, though Postlethwaite hits the bull on his first shot, his next two shot are a miss, the explanation being he couldn't do his normal trick shot routine! Frazer is next up, and hits four consecutives bulls, much to Mainwaring's surprise as when informed, he thinks he's shot the farmer's real bull. It turns out Frazer wasn't able to take part in practice as there was no more ammunition when it was his turn and that is a crack shot from his days in World War I when he used to shoot at mines from a minesweeper.

On to the last part of the competition which is to find the a church tower at a secret location using map coordinates (629571). The Walmington platoon are in Jones' van – he is driving when he suffers an inconvenient bought of delirium from Malaria. Frazer is providing directions but he is leading them in circles, passing the same cottage twice. Fortunately, the Eastgate platoon have been stuck in mud and also broken down, so the despite Jones' delirium and Frazer's directions, Walmington platoon reach the tower first.

They reach the top of the tower, but Jones has another fit of delirium and this gives the Eastgate boys the chance to raise their flag. However, Frazer notes that it's the Walmington platoon's flag they're flying, and not their own. Square is irate, but Walmington platoon have won! The Eastgate platoon leave the tower in a huff, and Mainwaring prepares to chuck the Eastgate flag over the parapet, but Walker stops him. Mainwaring is shocked to learn that both flags are the same – Walker offers up an excuse, but Mainwaring sees through him, knowing he did it on purpose. However, he is prepared to let him off as he has used his initiative and because they won the contest.

Walker enquires if the guard of honour is for Winston Churchill, as he has just had a load of cigars "fall off the back of a lorry" and wonders if he'd like them as they were going cheap!

== Cast ==
- Arthur Lowe as Captain Mainwaring
- John Le Mesurier as Sergeant Wilson
- Clive Dunn as Lance Corporal Jones
- John Laurie as Private Frazer
- Larry Martyn as Private Walker and Sergeant Jenkins
- Arnold Ridley as Private Godfrey
- Ian Lavender as Private Pike
- Bill Pertwee as ARP Warden Hodges
- Geoffrey Lumsden as Captain Square
- Pearl Hackney as Mrs Pike
- Jack Watson as Brigadier Bell / Charlie Cheesemen
- Norman Bird as Bert Postlethwaite
- John Snagge as The Announcer

== Production ==
This radio episode largely follows the plot of the TV episode "Battle of the Giants!", however the essentially visual elements of the initiative tests (balloon bayoneting, carrying feathers to fill barrels and crossing a battlefield), which would not have worked on radio, are replaced by the bulk of the "Shooting Pains" TV episode. The main differences from the TV episodes are that the vicar and verger roles are removed from "Battle of the Giants!", and the sharpshooter role from "Shooting Pains" morphs from a female (Laura La Plaz) to a male (The Great Alberto).

This episode features Larry Martyn's first transmitted performance as Private Walker.

== Media release ==
This episode was released as a BBC CD in 2004.
