= The King Was in His Counting House =

- Dad's Army episode
- Episode no.: Series 5 Episode 7
- Directed by: David Croft
- Story by: Jimmy Perry and David Croft
- Original air date: 17 November 1972
- Running time: 30 minutes

Episode chronology
← Previous "If the Cap Fits..."	Next → "All is Safely Gathered In"

"The King was in His Counting House" is the seventh episode of the fifth series of the British comedy series Dad's Army. It was originally transmitted on 17 November 1972.

== Plot ==
Mainwaring is organising a drinks party at his house, despite his wife's fears that he and his men will "get drunk and smash the house up". He informs Wilson that he may call him "George" at the party, something Wilson takes great delight in. However, he sternly tells him he cannot call him "George" during work hours and turns down Mr. Pike's request to also call him "George" at the party.

The party starts off with Jones' section in attendance and clearly very uncomfortable. The stilted conversation remains until the arrival of Walker, with his girlfriend Shirley, which immediately throws Mainwaring off kilter. He serves them a small amount of beer and sandwiches, which they quickly wolf down, after which Mainwaring gives them a guided tour of the room, while Walker gets down to business with Shirley on the sofa.

Much excitement is generated by the imminent arrival of Mrs Mainwaring, but an air raid warning sees her scurrying to the shelter before being introduced or even being seen by any of the platoon members. Hodges arrives, and a few moments later bombs land on the allotments, the taxi garage and the bank. Alarmed, Mainwaring and his men hurry round to the bank to salvage the money. They secure it and carry it back to the church hall where they plan to count it. Mainwaring orders the other section to guard the money, but they refuse out of spite as they were not invited to the party, forcing Mainwaring to promise to throw them a party the following week.

After a very long night, they eventually total it up. They then attempt to carry it to Eastgate using a horse and cart supplied by Walker and their own bicycles. A short way into the journey, the money starts blowing out of the hamper used to carry it. Trying to alert Mainwaring's attention to this, Pike fires his rifle, only to frighten the horse and send it charging off into a field with the platoon following close behind on their bikes.

== Cast ==
- Arthur Lowe as Captain Mainwaring
- John Le Mesurier as Sergeant Wilson
- Clive Dunn as Lance Corporal Jones
- John Laurie as Private Frazer
- James Beck as Private Walker
- Arnold Ridley as Private Godfrey
- Ian Lavender as Private Pike
- Bill Pertwee as ARP Warden Hodges
- Frank Williams as the Reverend Timothy Farthing
- Edward Sinclair as the Verger Maurice Yeatman
- Wendy Richard as Shirley

== Notes ==
1. This episode maintains and builds on the running gag of the unseen Mrs. Mainwaring. Her footsteps are heard before she runs off when the air-raid siren sounds. As Frazer puts it, "we'll never see her now".
2. In this episode, Mainwaring attempts to hide his lower-class background by claiming his father was a member of "the Master Tailors' Guild"; when he leaves the room, Jones refutes Mainwaring's claims by revealing that Mainwaring's late father was not a tailor, merely a draper with a small business in a side alley who sold poor quality workman's trousers. Mainwaring's profligate brother, Barry, confirms this fact in the episode "My Brother and I".
3. Goof: Once counted, the money is going to be taken to the Eastgate branch of the bank and stored in their vault. In episode 11 of series 4, “A. Wilson (Manager)?, this branch was shown to be bombed and Mainwaring informs Wilson that the bank has decided to close that branch.

== Radio episode ==
"The King was in His Counting House" is the fifteenth episode of the second series of the British radio comedy series Dad's Army. It was originally transmitted on 20 May 1975.
