= Knights of Madness =

- Dad's Army episode
- Episode no.: Series 9 Episode 3
- Directed by: David Croft
- Story by: Jimmy Perry and David Croft
- Original air date: 16 October 1977
- Running time: 30 minutes

Episode chronology
← Previous "The Making of Private Pike"	Next → "The Miser's Hoard"

"Knights of Madness" is the third episode of the ninth and final series of the British comedy series Dad's Army. It was originally transmitted on 16 October 1977.

== Synopsis ==
To support the Wings for Victory Week, the platoon restages the Battle of Saint George and the Dragon. This does not go down well with Hodges and his ARP wardens, however, as they have been planning the same thing.

== Plot ==
At the town meeting, the council are trying to organise the events that will take place in order to celebrate Saint George's Day. After a vote, it is decided that the Home Guard and the ARP will share the grand finale. Both Mainwaring and Hodges are reluctant to reveal what they each will be doing for the event.

Later that day, Mainwaring is in his office with Wilson and Pike. Mainwaring tells them of his plan to celebrate St. George's Day by staging a fight between St. George and a dragon, representing Britain's fight against Hitler. Mainwaring reveals that he will be playing St. George.

Later at the church hall, Mainwaring insists on wearing a real knight's metal helmet, despite Wilson's objections. After some trouble with getting the helmet's visor open, Mainwaring is ready. Jones and the rest of the men enter in their huge dragon costume. Mainwaring says he will start the fight by shouting "Cry God for Harry, England and St. George!", but the men have trouble getting the dragon's smoke machine to work, and they all soon emerge, coughing, from inside the costume. Meanwhile, an embarrassed Pike is told to dress up as a Squander Bug using a costume his mother made him, but later manages to get out of this and becomes a herald instead.

During the rehearsal of the fight outside, Mainwaring is finding it quite difficult to manoeuver in a real suit of armour, and the men have to hoist him up onto his horse. He is still persistent, stating that "if our forebears could wear it, so can I". After falling off the horse a number of times, he eventually gives up and agrees to let Godfrey's sister knit him a suit of armour.

As the platoon are about to get their staged fight underway, the ARP interrupt them, as they too are staging the fight between St. George and the dragon, with Hodges as St. George. As things take a turn for the worse, Hodges challenges Mainwaring to a duel, which he accepts. The two dragons also face off, with Jones at the head of one and the Vicar at the head of the other. Wilson tells Pike that they "ought to do something" and with that, Pike shoots Hodges' horse in the backside using his herald's trumpet as a peashooter, causing it to rear up and throw Hodges off. The Home Guard dragon eventually defeats the ARP dragon, and Mainwaring salutes the cheering crowd from his horse.

== Notes ==
1. This episode references the legend of St George and the Dragon. However it throws a peculiar twist on it by having St George fight St George and the dragon fight the dragon.
2. This episode is mistakenly copyrighted 1972, as it was recorded and filmed in 1977.

== Cast ==
- Arthur Lowe as Captain Mainwaring
- John Le Mesurier as Sergeant Wilson
- Clive Dunn as Lance Corporal Jones
- John Laurie as Private Frazer
- Arnold Ridley as Private Godfrey
- Ian Lavender as Private Pike
- Janet Davies as Mrs Pike
- Bill Pertwee as ARP Warden Hodges
- Frank Williams as The Vicar
- Edward Sinclair as The Verger
- Colin Bean as Private Sponge
- Janet Davies as Mrs. Pike
- Olive Mercer as Mrs. Yeatman
- Eric Longworth as the Town Clerk
- Fred McNaughton as the Mayor
