= Gorilla Warfare (Dad's Army) =

- Dad's Army episode
- Episode no.: Series 7 Episode 3
- Directed by: David Croft
- Story by: Jimmy Perry and David Croft
- Original air date: 29 November 1974
- Running time: 30 minutes

Episode chronology
← Previous "A Man of Action"	Next → "The Godiva Affair"

"Gorilla Warfare" is the third episode of the seventh season of the British comedy series Dad's Army. It was originally transmitted on Friday 29 November 1974.

== Synopsis ==
Mainwaring casts himself as a highly important secret agent whom his platoon must escort to a clandestine destination.

== Plot ==
The platoon arrives at the church hall and load their equipment onto Jones' van, ready for a weekend exercise. Mainwaring briefs the men on the exercise, which concerns guerrilla warfare. The objective of the exercise is to transport a highly important agent (Mainwaring) to a selected destination while avoiding the best efforts of counter-agents GHQ has put out to capture him. The importance of the exercise does not stop Godfrey and Wilson bringing a few luxury items, to the consternation of Mainwaring.

Mainwaring then takes the opportunity to ridicule Captain Square and the Eastgate platoon, after their attempt at the exercise the previous week resulted in Square being captured after only an hour. Unbeknownst to Mainwaring, the Verger and Warden Hodges are watching them, discussing their plans to sabotage the platoon's efforts on the orders of Captain Square, who has offered them £1 each to foil Mainwaring.

The platoon embarks on the exercise with various adventures, such as ignoring two nuns who need help with their car and checking a baby's pram for a wireless receiver. Making surprisingly good progress, they also manage to avoid the schemes of Hodges and the Verger who, while walking through some woodland, are suddenly pursued by what appears to be a gorilla. Meanwhile, a man in a white coat approaches Mainwaring with a story about a missing gorilla, trained by the War Office for war work. Sensing a ploy, the men dismiss this information, even when Hodges, having taken refuge in a tree, tells them of the animal he and the Verger encountered.

That evening, the platoon arrive in an outlying barn to spend the night in. Frazer tells them the "Story of the Auld Empty Barn" ("There was nothing in it!"). Unbeknownst to them, the gorilla enters and hides in the straw unnoticed. After the men go to sleep, the gorilla sneaks away and returns to GHQ, where it is revealed to be an officer, Lieutenant Wood in disguise, spying on the platoon.

The following morning Mainwaring and his men attempt the final leg of the exercise, to transport Mainwaring to the special destination. Pressed for time after Mainwaring's inept skills with a compass get them nowhere, he and Jones commandeer Hodges' motorbike, with the rest of the platoon following in the van. Before they set off, Hodges returns, having called the RSPCA and summoned their help. They have provided him with a large hypodermic, though Mainwaring still brushes aside any suggestion of a gorilla, until it suddenly appears brandishing a revolver.

They race away on the motorbike, with the gorilla hijacking it. A panicking Jones tries to incapacitate it with the hypodermic, but jabs Mainwaring with it by mistake, causing him to lose control and veer off the road, but Jones manages to get hold of the revolver. As the rest of the platoon arrive, the gorilla implores them not to shoot, revealing himself as Lieutenant Wood. The Colonel arrives to congratulate the men on winning the exercise, while a slumped Mainwaring passes out.

== Cast ==
- Arthur Lowe as Captain Mainwaring
- John Le Mesurier as Sergeant Wilson
- Clive Dunn as Lance Corporal Jones
- John Laurie as Private Frazer
- Arnold Ridley as Private Godfrey
- Ian Lavender as Private Pike
- Bill Pertwee as ARP Warden Hodges
- Edward Sinclair as The Verger
- Talfryn Thomas as Private Cheeseman
- Robert Raglan as The Colonel
- Robin Parkinson as Lieutenant Wood
- Erik Chitty as Mr. Clerk
- Rachel Thomas as The Mother Superior
- Michael Sharvell-Martin as The Lieutenant
- Verne Morgan as The Farmer
- Joy Allen as The Lady with the pram
