= Brain Versus Brawn =

- Dad's Army episode
- Episode no.: Series 5 Episode 10
- Directed by: David Croft
- Story by: Jimmy Perry and David Croft
- Original air date: 8 December 1972
- Running time: 30 minutes

Episode chronology
← Previous "When Did You Last See Your Money?"	Next → "A Brush with the Law"

"Brain Versus Brawn" is the tenth episode of the fifth series of the British comedy series Dad's Army. It was originally transmitted on 8 December 1972. It was also adapted for radio and broadcast as part of the second radio series in 1975. This was the highest-rated episode of Dad's Army, with 18.5 million viewers.

== Synopsis ==
The platoon dress up as firemen in order to infiltrate an enemy camp during a training exercise.

== Plot ==
At a Rotary Club dinner for several prominent people of the town, representing professions and crafts, the middle-class Mainwaring tries to ingratiate himself further with the upper classes, with little success. As he talks to Jones (who is representing the butchers), he is annoyed when he discovers that Walker is in attendance as well, mostly because he was the one who supplied all the food and drink for the event. Whilst talking with Colonel Pritchard, Jones and Walker are hurt to discover that their platoon is being left out of exercises training a new unit of commandos made of various Home Guard personnel, in a scheme dreamt up by the Training Major. Mainwaring calls the idea a "farce", claiming that the commandos use "brute force" rather than cunning and intellect, a notion that the others agree with. Pritchard offers to get them involved in the exercises to let them prove their point, which they eagerly accept.

The platoon is challenged to plant a dummy bomb in the Officer-in-Charge's office located inside a secure compound, which is protected by a guarded bridge. After exhaustive suggestion taking from the others, they decide that they need a scheme to cross both the bridge and get into the compound; Walker then claims that he has something in a warehouse near the compound that can help, and explains his plan: they disguise themselves as firemen, as it would allow them to enter the office to plant the dummy bomb. To assist in this plan, they get a "secret agent" to travel to the compound and start a fire in some wooden crates that would be left near the compound in advance.

The following afternoon, they all meet up at Walker's warehouse and discover his secret weapon: an old fire engine. Unfortunately, they learn too late that Wilson had arranged for the Verger to be the agent as Mrs Pike could not decide on her outfit. As they are about to set off, they hear the air raid siren, which Frazer points out will help their credibility. While travelling in the old fire engine, everything is going smoothly according to plan, but they do not realise that the Verger was caught loitering near the compound, looking for the crates that had been cleared away. After crossing the bridge, they are pulled over by Hodges, who tells them that a real fire is happening, forcing the platoon to the rescue.

Despite being out of their depth with the fire equipment, the platoon quickly connect up the hoses and start putting the fire out. Pritchard then arrives to tell Mainwaring that the bomb was delivered and they have won: Walker reveals that he arranged for a second dummy bomb to be sent through the post after the planning session the day before, which arrived in the morning post and was opened by the Training Major himself, thus proving that brains will always beat brawn.

== Cast ==
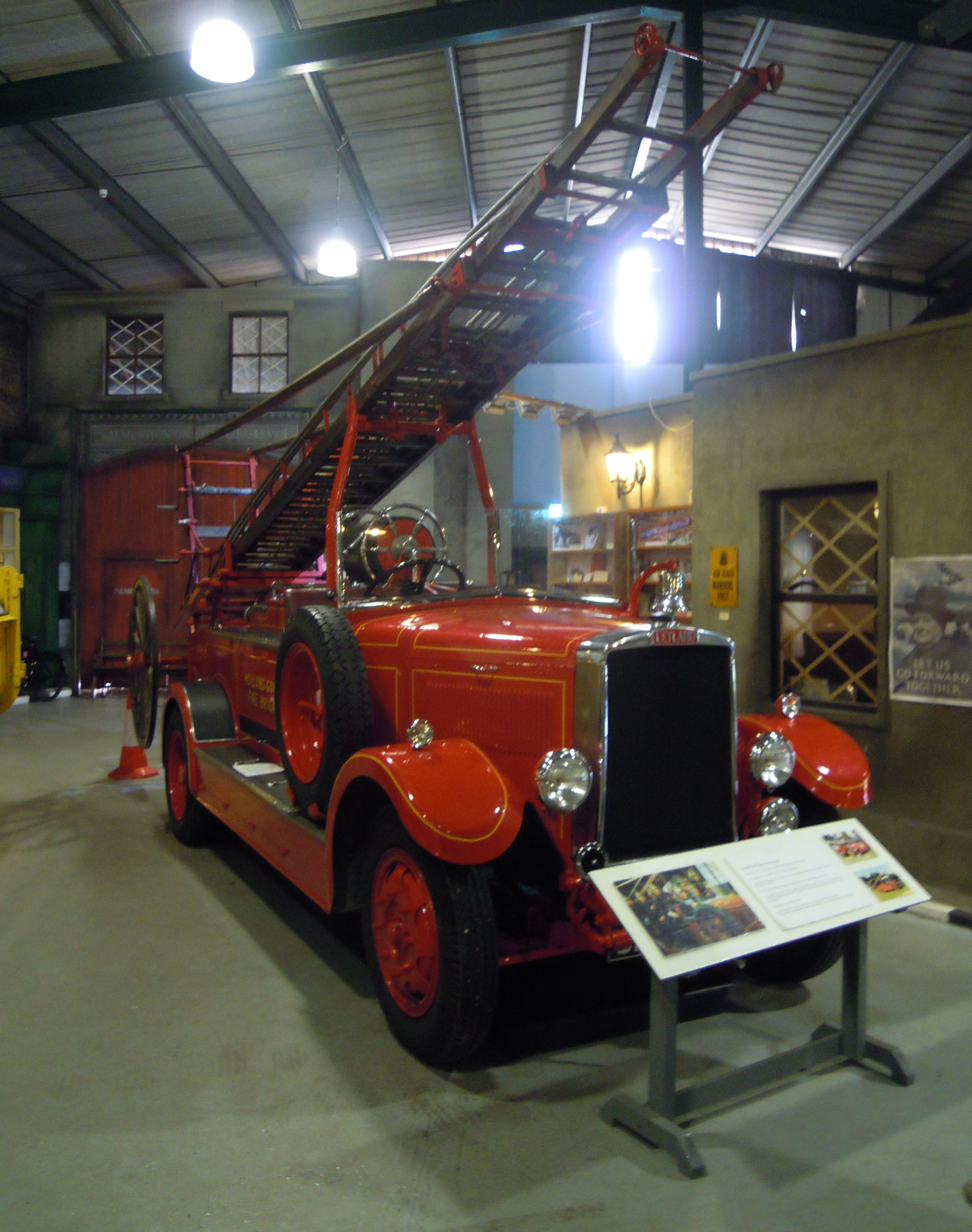
The fire engine used during filming of this episode is now on display at Bressingham Steam and Gardens in Norfolk.

- Arthur Lowe as Captain Mainwaring
- John Le Mesurier as Sergeant Wilson
- Clive Dunn as Lance Corporal Jones
- John Laurie as Private Frazer
- James Beck as Private Walker
- Arnold Ridley as Private Godfrey
- Ian Lavender as Private Pike
- Bill Pertwee as ARP Warden Hodges
- Robert Raglan as Colonel Pritchard
- Edward Sinclair as The Verger
- Anthony Roye as Mr Fairbrother
- Maggie Don as Waitress
- Geoffrey Hughes as Bridge Corporal
- David Rose as Dump Corporal

== Radio episode ==
Harold Snoad and Michael Knowles adapted the television script of Brain versus Brawn as a radio episode. It was the tenth episode of the second series and was broadcast on 15 April 1975.
