= Uninvited Guests =

- Dad's Army episode
- Episode no.: Series 4 Episode 12
- Directed by: David Croft
- Story by: Jimmy Perry and David Croft
- Original air date: 11 December 1970
- Running time: 30 minutes

Episode chronology
← Previous "A. Wilson (Manager)?"	Next → "Fallen Idol"

"Uninvited Guests" is the twelfth episode of the fourth series of the British comedy TV series Dad's Army. It was originally transmitted on Friday 11 December 1970.

== Synopsis ==
Following the bombing of ARP HQ, Hodges moves his wardens into the church hall alongside the Home Guard. Mainwaring, appalled by this development, protests to the vicar, Area HQ, the Civil Defence people and a fellow Rotarian, and eventually Hodges' wardens are ordered to leave, but not for another week.

== Plot ==
While Mainwaring is testing his new communication system, talking through sweet tins strung together by string, trouble is brewing on the horizon. The ARP Headquarters was bombed the previous night, and the town clerk and vicar have given them permission to move in with the Home Guard at the church hall. Mainwaring, naturally, is appalled at having to share his office with Hodges, and the hall with his "rabble". He orders his men to get rid of him, and Corporal Jones chases him out with a bayonet.

Hodges returns, this time with the vicar and the verger and takes over half the hall. The Home Guard platoon struggle to come to terms with this new sharing arrangement, and even Walker, who is usually shrewd in business, is unimpressed, though he takes the chance to sell the wardens a "firelighter" to light the stove. While Mainwaring and Hodges are wresting for control of the office telephone, a call comes through warning them of a fire that has started at a large building next to St Aldhem's church. After initially calling for the fire brigade, they realise that it is in fact their own headquarters burning, and the chimney set alight by Walker's firelighter.

The Wardens and Home Guard combine forces to try to put it out, entailing a rooftop drama with a hose and buckets of water. Eventually Wilson puts out the fire with a pinch of salt, despite Hodges's scepticism. Just as they are about to exit the roof, Mainwaring, Hodges and their men are trapped in a thunderstorm by a falling ladder, leading Mainwaring to ask Wilson if "the Fire Brigade wouldn't mind popping round".

== Cast ==
- Arthur Lowe as Captain Mainwaring
- John Le Mesurier as Sergeant Wilson
- Clive Dunn as Lance Corporal Jones
- John Laurie as Private Frazer
- James Beck as Private Walker
- Arnold Ridley as Private Godfrey
- Ian Lavender as Private Pike
- Bill Pertwee as ARP Warden Hodges
- Frank Williams as The Vicar
- Edward Sinclair as The Verger
- Rose Hill as Mrs. Cole
- Don Estelle as Gerald
