= Dad's Army (disambiguation) =

Dad's Army is a British television sitcom, which ran from 1968 until 1977, about the Home Guard in the Second World War.

Dad's Army may also refer to:

- Dad's Army radio episodes
- Dad's Army (1971 film), a spin-off of the television series
- Dad's Army (2016 film), based on the television series
- Dad's Army (stage show), based on the television series
- The Home Guard (United Kingdom), a defence organisation of the British Army during the Second World War, later portrayed in a TV show called Dad's Army
