= The Making of Private Pike =

- Dad's Army episode
- Episode no.: Series 9 Episode 2
- Directed by: Bob Spiers
- Story by: Jimmy Perry and David Croft
- Original air date: 9 October 1977
- Running time: 30 minutes

Episode chronology
| ← Previous "Wake Up Walmington" | Next → "Knights of Madness" |

"The Making of Private Pike" is the second episode of the ninth and final series of the British comedy series Dad's Army. It was originally transmitted on 9 October 1977.

== Synopsis ==
Mainwaring now has his own staff car. Pike, still heady from his raspberryade binge, borrows it to drive his new girlfriend to the cinema in Eastgate. Pike's naive and immature nature ruins the date. On the way back, however, and nine miles from Walmington, it runs out of petrol. It takes Pike all night to push it back. It becomes appropriate for Wilson to have a serious word with the boy.

== Cast ==
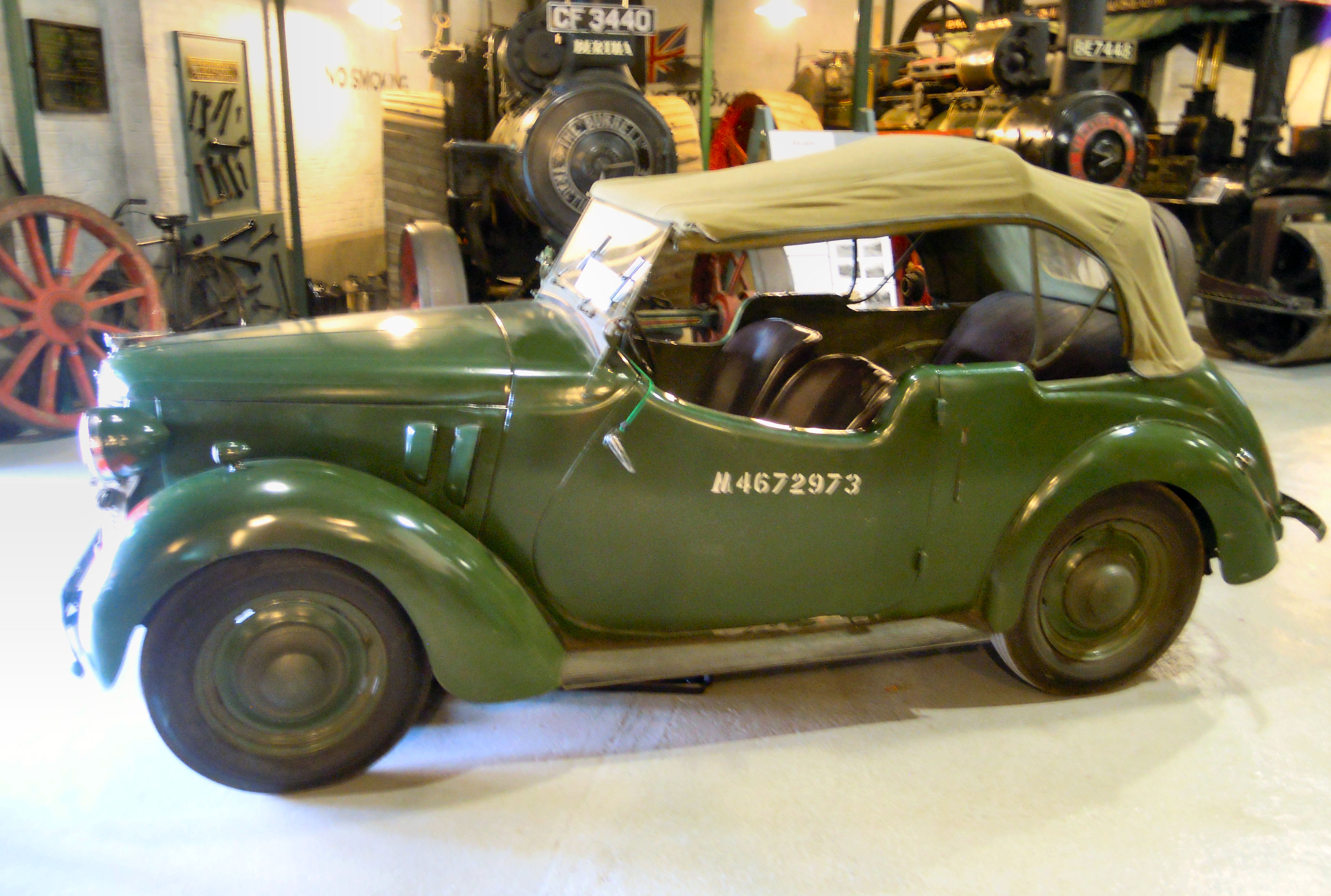
The Austin 8 used during filming is now at Bressingham Steam and Gardens

- Arthur Lowe as Captain Mainwaring
- John Le Mesurier as Sergeant Wilson
- Clive Dunn as Lance Corporal Jones
- John Laurie as Private Frazer
- Arnold Ridley as Private Godfrey
- Ian Lavender as Private Pike
- Janet Davies as Mrs Pike
- Bill Pertwee as ARP Warden Hodges
- Frank Williams as Reverend Timothy Farthing
- Edward Sinclair as The Verger
- Jean Gilpin as Sylvia
