= The Captain's Car =

- Dad's Army episode
- Episode no.: Series 7 Episode 5
- Directed by: David Croft
- Story by: Jimmy Perry and David Croft
- Original air date: 13 December 1974
- Running time: 30 minutes

Episode chronology
← Previous "The Godiva Affair"	Next → "Turkey Dinner"

"The Captain's Car" is the fifth episode of the seventh series of the British comedy series Dad's Army. It was originally transmitted on Friday 13 December 1974.

== Synopsis ==
Captain Mainwaring acquires a Rolls-Royce car for the platoon, but things get out of hand when the Mayor's car is mistaken for it and gets camouflaged.

== Plot ==
Mainwaring and Wilson are discussing the upcoming visit of a Free French general. Mainwaring voices his opinion that "the French don't make very good soldiers, you know, especially after lunch". Jones enters and announces the arrival of Lady Maltby, who carefully maintains her class distinction, being very superior to Mainwaring, then catches sight of Wilson, and greets him warmly as "Dear Arthur". They talk for a few minutes, obviously well acquainted, leaving Mainwaring fuming. Maltby explains that she is unable to acquire any petrol for her Rolls-Royce car, so is keen to see it used for the war effort. Mainwaring agrees to take it and decides to use the vehicle as a staff car, which will be camouflaged.

As Mainwaring is telling the men about the new car, Colonel Pritchard arrives to remind the platoon that they have been selected to provide the guard of honour for the French general. He also agrees to leave the ARP Wardens out of it, and has Wilson, due to his fluency in French, give a welcoming speech to the general.

Mainwaring's new car runs out of petrol at the town hall while on its way to be camouflaged, so Pike and Wilson go to help (unbeknownst to Mainwaring) and "requisition" some petrol from Warden Hodges' motorbike for the car. Meanwhile, Mainwaring sends Jones, Cheeseman and Frazer to collect the car, but when they arrive at the town hall, they only find the Mayor's car and take it instead, since Wilson and Pike had already left with Mainwaring's car. Thus, the men end up with two camouflaged Rolls-Royces. Hodges also gives Mainwaring a piece of his mind for letting the men take his bike's petrol.

Mr. Gordon, the town clerk phones the platoon to help look for the Mayor's car, believing it was stolen (as he was the one responsible for leaving it unguarded). After Frazer goes to respray the Mayor's car black again in time for the parade, Hodges sees his chance and blackmails Mainwaring into letting the Wardens join the Guard of Honour, which Mainwaring grudgingly accepts.

At the Guard of Honour, Frazer just manages to deliver the Mayor's (now black) car in time, but the paint is still wet. The Vicar's choir sings half of the French National Anthem ("they didn't have time to learn it all"), Wilson gives the French speech, and the French General is so overcome he kisses Wilson, then Mainwaring, on both cheeks. Then the flash of Cheeseman's camera startles him, and he steadies himself with his hands against the Rolls-Royce, so that when he kisses Hodges, the Warden ends up with black paint all over his face.

== Notes ==
The main car used in the episode was a 1934 Rolls-Royce 20/25, that belonged to a television and film prop company. Upon arrival for filming, director David Croft noticed that the Spirit of Ecstasy, usually on the bonnet, was missing, and so the car had to be driven back to London immediately for the missing emblem to be retrieved. The same car was used by the character Audrey fforbes-Hamilton in the BBC's To The Manor Born, and in other British and Hollywood films.

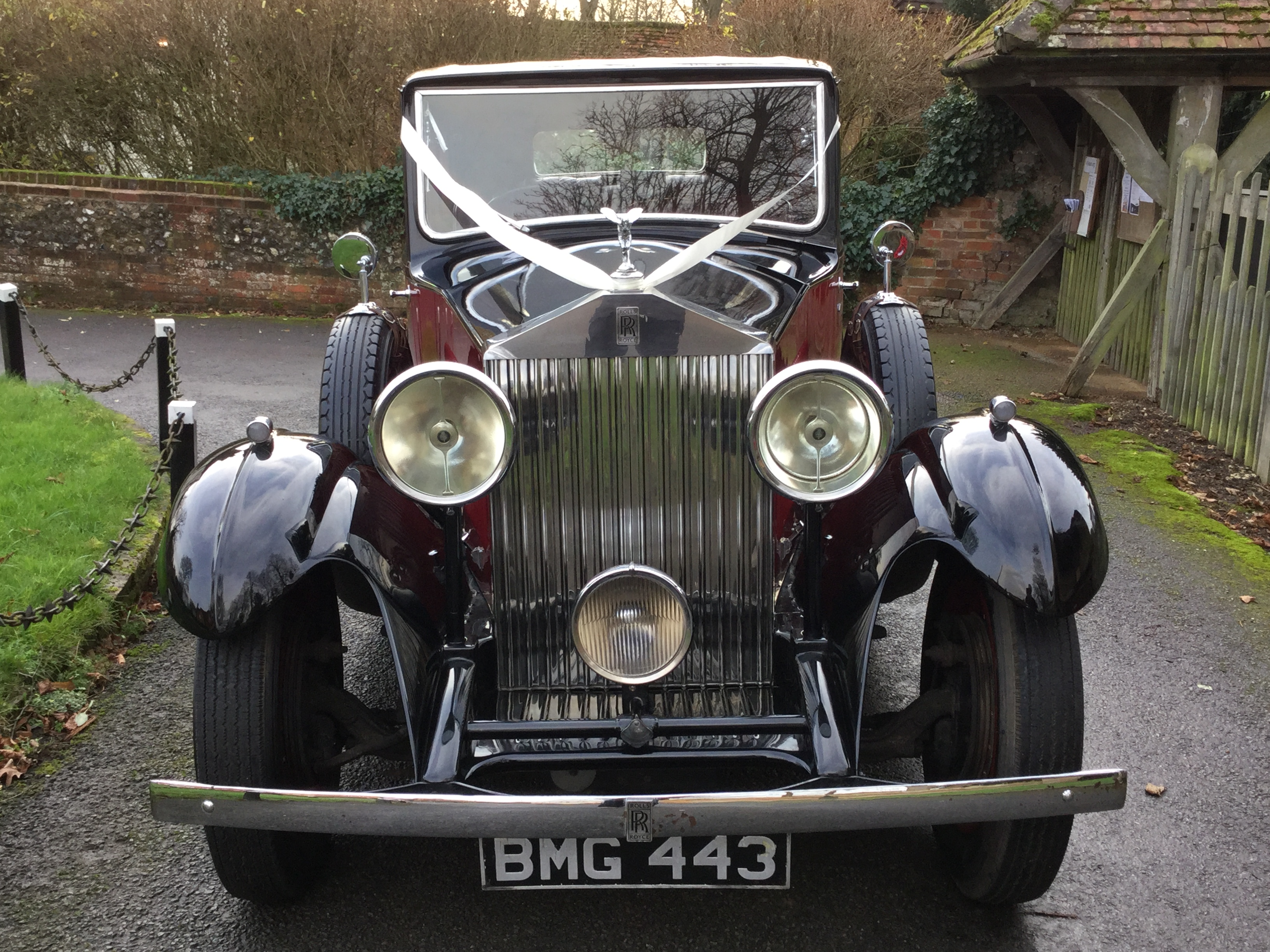
The Rolls-Royce 20/25 used in the episode

== Cast ==
- Arthur Lowe as Captain Mainwaring
- John Le Mesurier as Sergeant Wilson
- Clive Dunn as Lance Corporal Jones
- John Laurie as Private Frazer
- Arnold Ridley as Private Godfrey
- Ian Lavender as Private Pike
- Bill Pertwee as ARP Warden Hodges
- Talfryn Thomas as Private Cheeseman
- Frank Williams as The Vicar
- Edward Sinclair as The Verger
- Colin Bean as Private Sponge
- John Hart Dyke as The French General
- Eric Longworth as Town Clerk
- Fred McNaughton as The Mayor
- Mavis Pugh as Lady Maltby
- Robert Raglan as Colonel Pritchard
- Donald Morley as Glossip
