= Asleep in the Deep (Dad's Army) =

- Dad's Army episode
- Episode no.: Series 5 Episode 1
- Directed by: David Croft
- Story by: Jimmy Perry and David Croft
- Original air date: 6 October 1972
- Running time: 30 minutes

Episode chronology
← Previous "Battle of the Giants!"	Next → "Keep Young and Beautiful"

"Asleep in the Deep" is the first episode of the fifth series of the British television sitcom Dad's Army. It was originally transmitted on 6 October 1972. The title may have come from the song, Asleep in the Deep that is referenced by Private Walker in the episode.

== Synopsis ==
A bomb falls on the local pumping station, where Walker and Godfrey are on patrol. Efforts at freeing them result in the rest of the platoon becoming trapped with them, and a pipe bursting, filling the room rapidly with water...

== Plot ==
The episode opens with the Walmington-on-Sea Home Guard unit in an air raid shelter during a raid. Jones and his section arrive, Frazer complaining that the "shrapnel was coming down like hail". Pike makes a fool of himself by explaining why he acquires hundreds and thousands as his sweet ration to Mainwaring, but to Pike's dismay his sweets all go on the floor when a bomb falls nearby. They are joined by ARP Warden Hodges, who mentions that a bomb has fallen on the local pumping station. Godfrey and Walker are on duty there, so some of the platoon, with Hodges, go to rescue them.

When they arrive, Walker and Godfrey are unhurt but Godfrey is asleep in an inner room and Walker cannot wake him up. Bomb damage has made the corridor very dangerous, so Mainwaring puts two dots on pieces of paper to determine who goes at the head of a human chain with a frightened Hodges picking the first of the two dots. Mainwaring pulls a blank piece but lies to stop the young Pike of having any chance of being at the front. They quickly shift the rubble to gain access to the trapped men, with Mainwaring at the front, then Hodges, Wilson, Frazer, Pike, and Jones at the back. Once inside, they wake up Godfrey, who had taken soporific tablets to help him sleep (since he has had trouble sleeping lately), explaining why Walker couldn't wake him. Mainwaring asks Wilson to tell Jones to close his door, but Jones slams the door, thus bringing the roof down in the corridor and trapping everyone (except Jones, who is left outside) in the inner room. When Jones goes for help he breaks the handle on the outside door, leaving him trapped as well.

Mainwaring enlists Wilson's help to cheer the men up and wait for rescue. To pass the time, they sing "Under the Spreading Chestnut Tree", but whilst doing this a pipe bursts and the inner room starts to flood, Pike being soaked first by the jet of water. Jones tries to shut off the water from his side with the stopcock, but only increases it and leaving Pike's jacket, which he was using to try and wrap up the pipe, completely drenched.

Later, the inner room is now waist-high in water, with Pike standing in the flood, pleading with everyone to do something otherwise he will drown, Hodges floating in a tank, and the rest of the men crammed onto the bunks.

Much later, the water is chest-high. Pike is still pleading, and the rest assure him that they are thinking about how to get out. Eventually, Godfrey discovers a manhole that can be opened to allow them all to escape. The spanner needed to unbolt it is hanging high on the wall, and when Hodges tries to reach it, he falls out of his tank and into the water, dropping the spanner. Pike dives under the water and retrieves it, leaving him more wet than ever, but at least the men can get out. After opening the manhole, they crawl through it to the outside of the pumping house, then run round to rescue Jones, who has managed to open another inspection hatch into the flooded chamber.

But before they can all leave, Godfrey shuts the outside door ("There's a nasty draught and you're all wet. I didn't want you to catch cold"), therefore trapping them all in the outer room again and leaving Wilson having to go around again through the now neck-high water filled chamber to open the door from the other side.

== Production ==
The scenes inside the flooded room were recorded in a TV studio in front of a live audience (like all the other interior scenes). The entire studio set was lowered into a large water tank. To give the illusion of rising water levels, the set was lowered to a greater depth between scenes, with the cameras outside the tank lowered to match. At the greatest depth, Ian Lavender, whose character Pike was supposedly standing upright on the room floor, was in reality on his knees in the water tank.

== Cast ==
- Arthur Lowe as Captain Mainwaring
- John Le Mesurier as Sergeant Wilson
- Clive Dunn as Lance Corporal Jones
- John Laurie as Private Frazer
- James Beck as Private Walker
- Arnold Ridley as Private Godfrey
- Ian Lavender as Private Pike
- Bill Pertwee as ARP Warden Hodges
- Colin Bean as Private Sponge
