= A Brush with the Law =

- Dad's Army episode
- Episode no.: Series 5 Episode 11
- Directed by: David Croft
- Story by: Jimmy Perry and David Croft
- Original air date: 15 December 1972
- Running time: 30 minutes

Episode chronology
← Previous "Brain Versus Brawn"	Next → "Round and Round Went the Great Big Wheel"

"A Brush with the Law" is the eleventh episode of the fifth series of the British comedy series Dad's Army. It was originally transmitted on 15 December 1972.

== Synopsis ==
Captain Mainwaring is charged with showing a light, contrary to blackout rules, and is taken to court by a delighted Warden Hodges.

== Plot ==
At the ARP headquarters, Hodges is writing at the desk when Reg, one of the Wardens enters and reports on how the light in the church hall office was on for a whole hour, and how he had to nearly break in to put it out. Hodges is overjoyed, as he finally has a chance to get Mainwaring busted.

At the church, Mainwaring and Wilson are in the office checking the patrol schedule. Mainwaring tells Wilson that he should have his hair cut, to which Wilson replies that Mrs Pike thinks he looks like Anthony Eden. Mainwaring then gets a phone call from Captain Square, who explains that he had met Mainwaring's men on patrol recently and saw that their rifles were filthy. Mainwaring angrily chastises Wilson for this and they go to inspect the men's rifles. During the inspection, Hodges enters with a policeman carrying a summons and accuses Mainwaring of the light he seemingly left on in the office. Mainwaring is skeptical and informs his solicitor, but as all evidence points to the contrary, he will have to go to court. The platoon decide to help by testifying on Mainwaring's behalf and rehearse a story claiming his innocence, though Jones has trouble remembering it.

On the day of the trial, Mainwaring has decided to conduct his own defence, but soon discovers that the magistrate is Captain Square (who seems just as determined to convict him as Hodges is). Several witnesses are called, including the Vicar, and things start to look bad for Mainwaring, especially when Jones is called and messes up the platoon's defence story. But then Walker steps in and reveals he was out delivering "supplies" to a "nearby customer", putting some pressure on Square by reminding him of his own illegal activities, such as buying black market whisky. Just as Square is about to dismiss the trial, the Verger confesses it was he who was showing the light, having used the office after the platoon had left on patrol to write his memoirs, much to the fury of Hodges.

The case is dismissed and Mainwaring is allowed to leave the court "without a stain on his character". He attributes his acquittal to "honesty, fair play and the integrity of British justice".

== Cast ==
- Arthur Lowe as Captain Mainwaring
- John Le Mesurier as Sergeant Wilson
- Clive Dunn as Lance Corporal Jones
- John Laurie as Private Frazer
- James Beck as Private Walker
- Arnold Ridley as Private Godfrey
- Ian Lavender as Private Pike
- Bill Pertwee as ARP Warden Hodges
- Geoffrey Lumsden as Captain Square
- Frank Williams as The Vicar
- Edward Sinclair as The Verger
- Stuart Sherwin as Junior Warden Reg Adamson
- Jeffrey Gardiner as Mr Wintergreen
- Marjorie Wilde as Lady Magistrate
- Chris Gannon as Mr Bone, the Clerk of the Court
- Toby Perkins as Usher

== Notes ==
1. Mainwaring is prosecuted under the Emergency Powers (Defence) Act 1939, which had been rushed onto the statute book by the government under public pressure. Under its rules, Mainwaring could have been sentenced to several months in prison had he been found guilty as charged.
2. After Mainwaring is proved innocent, Pike says "it's just like that film with John Garfield", a reference to the 1939 film They Made Me a Criminal.
3. After the recording of this episode, the regular cast recorded the special sketch "Broadcast to the Empire" which was transmitted as part of the 1972 Christmas Night with the Stars on BBC1.
