= Time on My Hands (Dad's Army) =

- Dad's Army episode
- Episode no.: Series 5 Episode 13
- Directed by: David Croft
- Story by: Jimmy Perry and David Croft
- Original air date: 29 December 1972
- Running time: 30 minutes

Episode chronology
| ← Previous "Broadcast to the Empire" | Next → "The Deadly Attachment" |

"Time on My Hands" is the thirteenth and final episode of the fifth series of the British comedy series Dad's Army. It was originally transmitted on 29 December 1972.

== Synopsis ==
A German pilot has bailed out and is now tangled up on the town hall's clock tower. Mainwaring's men are obliged to retrieve him. Getting up is not a problem – they can climb a makeshift ladder. Getting down again proves more difficult – Jones has broken the ladder.

== Plot ==
Mainwaring and Wilson are enjoying a relaxing morning coffee at the Marigold Tea Rooms. Walker comes in and asks Mainwaring to go outside and tell him if the police are about. This is because Walker has to bring some unauthorised items in for the shop. Mainwaring refuses to be part of Walker's black market business. After Walker leaves, Pike and Jones burst in, announcing that a Luftwaffe pilot is stuck hanging from the roof of the town hall after bailing out. Gathering together the rest of the platoon, they head straight for the town hall.

When they arrive, they find the ARP and Warden Hodges marshalling a large crowd of spectators, watching the stranded German hanging from his parachute, which is caught on the clock tower. Mainwaring brusquely pushes Hodges aside and takes over command of the situation himself. He leads his men (except Godfrey, who stays behind and watches from outside) up a ladder to the tower, to try to rescue the German. The ladder is a makeshift one made out of several ladders to replace the tower's old staircase that was destroyed by a fire bomb the previous year.

After a number of failed attempts to rescue the pilot, with his lack of English not helping matters, they eventually manage to reach him using a pole found by Jones. Unfortunately, the pole had been holding up the ladders to the tower, which collapse, leaving them stranded. While Mainwaring puts the German pilot under close arrest, he and the rest of the men try to find a way to get back down. Meanwhile, on the ground level, a sneering Hodges mocks their predicament, enraged because it was he who had erected the ladders in the first place. Mainwaring and Pike drop a note in a glass bottle to the ground asking for help, but Hodges just writes in chalk "How are you going to get down?" on the pavement, prompting Pike to throw a second bottle down at him in annoyance. The Vicar and the Verger arrive, and after being told of the platoon's predicament, the Vicar has an idea, and leaves to fetch something.

The platoon suggests various ideas of getting down. Pike and Jones suggest using the German's parachute; the former says they could float down with it, while the latter says they could tear it up and "plait" it into a rope. Fraser tells a story of two lighthouse keepers who were trapped in a lighthouse and decided to get out by dismantling it as they had gone mad from the isolation. Wilson tells a story his nanny told him: a Prince rescued a beautiful Princess trapped in a tower by firing an arrow into the tower; attached to the arrow was a piece of thread, attached to the thread was a piece of twine and attached to that was a rope which the Princess used to escape. All of this is just too much for Mainwaring. Eventually, Walker comes up with something: he suggests using a rope with a weight on the end in the tower to get down. Mainwaring claims he already noticed the rope and was just waiting to see if anybody else would.

When the men try to free the rope, they accidentally start up the clock mechanism. After Jones gets caught up in (and rescued from) the clock automatons twice, and several of the men's finest hats are ruined to silence the large bell in order to avoid a false invasion alert, an arrow loosed by the Vicar strikes the tower – a note wrapped around it states that there is a piece of thread attached to the arrow; attached to the thread is a piece of twine and attached to the twine is a piece of rope, just like in the fairy tale Wilson's nanny told him.

== Cast ==
- Arthur Lowe as Captain Mainwaring
- John Le Mesurier as Sergeant Wilson
- Clive Dunn as Lance Corporal Jones
- John Laurie as Private Frazer
- James Beck as Private Walker
- Arnold Ridley as Private Godfrey
- Ian Lavender as Private Pike
- Bill Pertwee as ARP Warden Hodges
- Frank Williams as Vicar
- Edward Sinclair as The Verger
- Harold Bennett as Mr Blewitt
- Colin Bean as Private Sponge
- Joan Cooper as Miss Fortescue
- Eric Longworth as Mr Gordon the Town Clerk
- Christopher Sandford as The German Pilot

== Notes ==
1. This is the only episode since the first series (apart from "Something Nasty in the Vault") in which the platoon does not wear their uniforms for the whole episode.
2. Mainwaring calls his bank Martins Bank (a real-life bank, whose name is also used in the 1971 film), instead of the fictitious "Swallows Bank" usually used in the series.
3. Mainwaring refers to his revolver as a "thirty-eight". Considering its appearance, this means it is probably intended to be a Webley Mk IV .38/200 Service Revolver or an Enfield No. 2 Mk I. However, in some episodes, such as "The Deadly Attachment", the prop is recognisably a Webley Mark VI in .455 calibre.
