= If the Cap Fits... =

- Dad's Army episode
- Episode no.: Series 5 Episode 6
- Directed by: David Croft
- Story by: Jimmy Perry and David Croft
- Original air date: 10 November 1972
- Running time: 30 minutes

Episode chronology
← Previous "The Desperate Drive of Corporal Jones"	Next → "The King was in his Counting House"

"If the Cap Fits..." is the sixth episode of the fifth series of the British television sitcom Dad's Army. It was originally transmitted on 10 November 1972.

== Synopsis ==
When Private Frazer openly complains about Captain Mainwaring's supposedly irrelevant lectures, Mainwairing decides to let Frazer take over for a few days to assuage his grumbling.

== Plot ==
The episode opens with the Walmington-on-Sea Home Guard unit in the church hall, waiting for Mainwaring to give a presentation. Led by Frazer, the disgruntled platoon begin a chorus of "Why are we waiting", to the tune of "O Come All Ye Faithful". Mainwaring enters and tells them to be quiet. He begins to give them a farcical slideshow entitled "Know your enemy", which contains exaggerated drawings of German infantrymen, panzer crew and parachutists. The show is narrated languidly by Wilson, who insists on wearing a monocle.

Jones is attempting to operate the projector, closely watched by the Verger. Godfrey is asleep, whilst Walker and Pike interject with silly questions. Warden Hodges arrives and accuses them of looking at dirty pictures, and Jones finally messes up, showing a picture of a topless Zulu woman from the Vicar's slide collection, "Light into Darkest Africa", much to Hodges' delight and Mainwaring's discomfort.

Afterwards in the office, Mainwaring threatens to stop Wilson wearing the monocle, but Wilson responds by threatening to tell everyone that Mainwaring wears arch supports for his feet. Frazer enters, and not only tells Mainwaring the lecture was a waste of time, but consults notes he has made and reminds Mainwaring of other similar irrelevant lectures, such as "Why the Germans don't play cricket" and "How to send Hitler a poisoned carpet" (because he chews the rug when angry), and observes that Mainwaring has wasted 438 hours on "useless blather". Naturally, Mainwaring is furious at Frazer's insubordinate behaviour. He consults the Home Guard manual and discovers a potential solution to the problem. Back on parade, he challenges Frazer to take command of the platoon for a week. To Mainwaring's surprise, Frazer agrees.

Once Frazer is in charge, he swiftly reduces Wilson to the ranks for discrepancies in the platoon stores, and is so rude to Jones that he resigns. Mainwaring has been banished to the broom cupboard, where he is soon joined by a furious Wilson and a distraught Jones. Mainwaring observes that Frazer is playing into their hands by "antagonizing" the rest of the platoon. However, they are interrupted by Pike, who reveals that he is the platoon's new lance corporal, having been promoted by Frazer, due to Pike's "hidden qualities" of "drive, tenacity, and leadership". They are then interrupted by Wilson's replacement, the newly-promoted Sergeant Walker, who assumes the demeanour of a hard-nosed NCO, complete with a swagger stick, and proceeds to tell the now-Privates Wilson and Jones that they can go home (to "recuperate"). He also passes on a request from Frazer: that Mainwaring should turn over his own swagger stick and leather gloves.

Back in Mainwaring's office, Frazer is having a chat with Godfrey. Initially, he appears sympathetic to Godfrey's age and health-related problems, telling him that if he ever feels unwell, he will be excused without any trouble. After a grateful Godfrey thanks him, Frazer changes his manner, sternly telling Godfrey that if he does decide to come on parade, he will receive no special treatment, and will have to do what the other members of the platoon do. Just then, a Scottish officer, Major-General Menzies, arrives. A puzzled Godfrey departs, and Frazer and Menzies discuss the state of the platoon as it currently stands. Pleased at finding a fellow Scot in command, Menzies invites Frazer to play the bagpipes to pipe in the haggis at a forthcoming regimental dinner. Frazer agrees, though, as Menzies departs, he calls Frazer "Mainwaring", revealing that he is unaware that Frazer has temporarily replaced Mainwaring as commander of the platoon.

Discussing his arrangement with the Colonel in the mess, Menzies tells him to organise the dinner, and the Colonel (who, unlike Menzies, knows Mainwaring) expresses his surprise that Mainwaring is Scottish and can play the pipes.

Back in the church hall, Frazer's tenure has ended. Mainwaring is quick to re-establish control and forget about the whole incident, although both Walker and Pike speak up in favour of Frazer, while Jones remains loyal to Mainwaring. Frazer attempts to tell Mainwaring about the commitment to pipe the haggis at the dinner, but Mainwaring does not give him a chance.

Later, Mainwaring and the platoon arrive at the regimental dinner. A sergeant appears and takes Mainwaring through the procedure. Finally, to Mainwaring's surprise, the sergeant presents him with some bagpipes. Expecting Mainwaring to be nonplussed, Frazer issues an ultimatum: "It was me he invited because he was impressed with my handling of the platoon. There's only one thing you can do: let me go into the dinner playing the pipes at the head of MY platoon". Mainwaring refuses, shoulders the pipes and the platoon forms up, ready to lead the haggis in. Wilson and Frazer predict doom, but Mainwaring reveals that,

"I spent my honeymoon at a place in Scotland called InverGeechie [sic]. It was a wild and lonely place. The nights were long ... and there was nothing else to do."

To everyone's amazement, Mainwaring starts the pipes and, playing magnificently, leads the haggis party into the mess. Frazer is left outside, dumbfounded. He finally shouts that he apparently never doubted Mainwaring and rushes in after the rest.

== Cast ==
- Arthur Lowe as Captain Mainwaring
- John Le Mesurier as Sergeant Wilson
- Clive Dunn as Lance Corporal Jones
- John Laurie as Private Frazer
- James Beck as Private Walker
- Arnold Ridley as Private Godfrey
- Ian Lavender as Private Pike
- Bill Pertwee as ARP Warden Hodges
- Robert Raglan as Colonel Pritchard
- Campbell Singer as Major-General Menzies
- Alex McAvoy as The Sergeant
