= Broadcast to the Empire =

- Dad's Army episode
- Directed by: David Croft
- Story by: Jimmy Perry and David Croft
- Original air date: 25 December 1972
- Running time: 14 minutes

Episode chronology
| ← Previous "Round and Round Went the Great Big Wheel" | Next → "Time on My Hands" |

"Broadcast to the Empire" is the fourth (and final) Christmas Night with the Stars sketch of the British television comedy series Dad's Army. It was originally transmitted on Monday 25 December 1972. A full-length radio version was also made, entitled Ten Seconds From Now, which was the last radio episode to be made.

== Cast ==
- Arthur Lowe as Captain Mainwaring
- John Le Mesurier as Sergeant Wilson
- Clive Dunn as Lance Corporal Jones
- John Laurie as Private Frazer
- James Beck as Private Walker
- Arnold Ridley as Private Godfrey
- Ian Lavender as Private Pike
- Bill Pertwee as ARP Warden Hodges
- Roger Gartland as BBC Engineer
- Frank Thornton as Mr Willerby Troughton-Maxwell, BBC Producer

== Plot ==
The platoon is excited by the broadcast, which they will be performing from the church hall where a microphone and radio speaker have already been set up. There is a great deal of excitement in the platoon, though the typically cynical Chief ARP Warden Hodges bets they will "make a right mess of it"; he then leaves to go and listen on the Verger's Wireless.

During a run-through practice of the script, the BBC producer, Mr. Willerby Troughton-Maxwell (who is heard from Broadcasting House over the speaker), annoys Captain Mainwaring by telling him he "does not sound like an officer", and suggesting that he and Sergeant Wilson switch parts. Mainwaring firmly points out, "I am the officer, and he is the sergeant, and that's the way it's staying!" Meanwhile, Lance Corporal Jones irritates both Troughton-Maxwell and the BBC sound engineer present at the broadcast by continually banging on the microphone.

Sergeant Wilson's lines have been written to be spoken in a Cockney accent which does not suit him too well. The rest of the men play up to their usual roles. The BBC sound effects team are unable to make it to the broadcast because their van has broken down, and so the platoon is forced to imitate the required coastal noises (namely wind, waves and seagulls, the latter being Private Pike's only contribution) themselves.

Later, the platoon is ready and waiting to go on the air, but strangely nothing seems to be happening; not even the BBC engineer knows what is going on. Hodges enters to ask, "What happened to you lot?" and says that the programme is all over; he has just been listening to the King's speech and "Old Mother Riley's Christmas Party is on now". Troughton-Maxwell apologises, revealing that a preceding broadcast from Hong Kong overran and the platoon's contribution has had to be dropped, because the BBC could not keep His Majesty waiting. The platoon takes their revenge by all banging repeatedly on the microphone.

== Notes ==
1. This sketch exists in the BBC Archives and was released on the BBC DVD Dad's Army – The Christmas Specials and can be found in the "Extras" menu. along with the 1969 sketch.
2. This was recorded the same day as A Brush with the Law.
3. The sketch reflects BBC practice at the time in which it is set as radio broadcasts were usually scripted rather than participants being able to speak spontaneously.
