= Round and Round Went the Great Big Wheel =

- Dad's Army episode
- Episode no.: Series 5 Episode 12
- Directed by: David Croft
- Story by: Jimmy Perry and David Croft
- Original air dates: 22 December 1972; (recorded 1 December 1972)
- Running time: 30 minutes

Episode chronology
← Previous "A Brush with the Law"	Next → "Broadcast to the Empire"

"Round and Round Went the Great Big Wheel" is the twelfth episode of the fifth series of the British comedy series Dad's Army that was originally transmitted on 22 December 1972.

== Synopsis ==
Operation Catherine Wheel has been set up in order to test the War Office's latest weapon: a large, radio-controlled, high explosive-carrying wheel. The Walmington-on-Sea platoon is chosen for fatigues.

== Plot ==
The episode opens with a General briefing two others in the War Office building in 1941: the General briefs the others about a weapon called the High Explosive Attack Device Propelled by Ultra High Frequency (HEADPUHF) and the test called "Operation Catherine Wheel". Several local Home Guard units will be roped in to help during the test and the smarmy Captain Stewart tells them he will get the Walmington-On-Sea brigade to do the dirty work.

When Captain Stewart arrives in Walmington to recruit the platoon, Captain Mainwaring misinterprets his hesitancy in describing what exactly they are required for to mean 'special duties' – Stewart allows him to believe this to get his co-operation. Mainwaring debriefs the platoon down in the church crypt to maintain secrecy, but ARP Warden Hodges barges in. Deciding they cannot trust him to keep quiet, they take him with them to the base where the test is taking place.

However, the men are annoyed to find that their 'special duties' involve dirty work such as peeling potatoes and digging latrines, much to Hodges' amusement. Pike gets bored and sneaks out back to Jones' van with Walker. It's revealed that Pike has built a kit radio and brought it along, and they try to tune in to the comedy programme Hi Gang!. Unbeknownst to them, the signals from the radio interfere with the control signals for the secret weapon – a giant rocket-propelled wheel – and make it go berserk. It rolls out of the base during its demonstration test and the Walmington platoon find themselves having to pursue it – if they don't stop it, it will explode and the town will be destroyed.

The chase is a shambles, with the wheel repeatedly chasing the platoon's van and even appearing to ambush them (due to the signals from Pike's radio). Stewart, who has been following them, tells them that they can disable the wheel by cutting off its two antennae. The men cut off the first antennae on the wheel's side with their bayonets while driving past it, but run out of petrol soon after.

When Walker suggests they could use Pike's radio to lure the wheel, Mainwaring is infuriated about Pike's secret radio, but they follow Walker's plan, with Mainwaring, Hodges and Pike taking off on a commandeered motorcycle. While they're gone, Jones comes up with a plan on how to deal with the wheel's top antennae, and they head to a nearby railway bridge. As Pike and Mainwaring lure the wheel under the bridge, Jones is lowered down and manages to cut the antennae off with a pair of pruning shears, causing the wheel to topple over. The platoon gather around the fallen weapon as Jones reports "Mr. Mainwaring... I've killed it" and hang their heads in respect.

== Cast ==
- Arthur Lowe as Captain Mainwaring
- John Le Mesurier as Sergeant Wilson
- Clive Dunn as Lance Corporal Jones
- John Laurie as Private Frazer
- James Beck as Private Walker
- Arnold Ridley as Private Godfrey
- Ian Lavender as Private Pike
- Bill Pertwee as ARP Warden Hodges
- Edward Underdown as Major General Sir Charles Holland
- Michael Knowles as Captain Stewart
- Geoffrey Chater as Colonel Pierce
- Jeffrey Segal as Minister
- John Clegg as Wireless Operator

== Notes ==
1. This episode references the many different, and often bizarre, weapons tested by the War Office at the time. In contrast to some of the schemes the 'big wheel' is actually rather practical. The weapon is based on a real device called the Panjandrum although this was never radio-controlled.
2. The HEADPUHF prop was not actually propelled by rockets. It was designed to have a human occupant in the centre, pedalling it along. When this mechanism broke down during filming the crew resorted to pushing it into shot and filming as it slowed down.
3. Pike and Walker listen to Hi Gang!, a comedy radio show during World War II. It featured Vic Oliver, Prime Minister Winston Churchill's son-in-law.
4. The title of the episode is a covert reference to "An engineer told me before he died", an extremely bawdy Oscar Brand song of the day.
5. This was the last appearance of Michael Knowles in Dad's Army.
