= A. Wilson (Manager)? =

- Dad's Army episode
- Episode no.: Series 4 Episode 11
- Directed by: David Croft
- Story by: Jimmy Perry and David Croft
- Original air date: 4 December 1970
- Running time: 30 minutes

Episode chronology
← Previous "The Test"	Next → "Uninvited Guests"

"A. Wilson (Manager)?" is the eleventh episode of the fourth series of the British comedy series Dad's Army. It was originally transmitted on 4 December 1970.

== Synopsis ==
Captain Mainwaring is infuriated to discover that Wilson is heading for promotion both at the bank and in the Home Guard.

== Plot ==
Mainwaring arrives at the bank one morning just as Pike is bringing in two letters marked "Delayed by Enemy Action". He then begins to set up the Lewis Gun in the office window, before receiving a telephone call from Mr West at head office. He orders Pike to attend to the gun whilst he takes the call. Mr West informs him that they "shan't be able to send anyone to replace Wilson for several weeks". Confused, Mainwaring proceeds to ask what he is talking about. He learns that Wilson has been made manager of the Eastgate branch, and the letter informing him of this must have been destroyed in an air raid.

Vexed, Mainwaring hangs up the phone only to receive another call from Colonel Pritchard from GHQ, informing him that Wilson's commission had come through and he had been made a second lieutenant in the Eastgate platoon. His anger growing, Mainwaring receives a call from the Vicar and sardonically asks him if he is about to tell him if Wilson has been made Archbishop of Canterbury. After Mainwaring has calmed down, the Vicar asks if he will cancel his parade that night so he can hold his own function. Mainwaring obliges, and just as he hangs up the phone Wilson walks in and informs Mainwaring that the reason for his late arrival is that he was out buying an officer's cap, further infuriating Mainwaring. A war of words ensues between Mainwaring and Wilson, which boils down to the fact that Wilson went to public school. To annoy Wilson, Mainwaring summons Pike into his office and promotes him to chief clerk and after Pike leaves, he summons Jones and promotes him to Sergeant. He puts Jones' promotion in writing and asks Pike to type it up, duplicate it and see that every platoon member gets a copy. However, he forgot to put Jones' name at the top, resulting in every member of the platoon each believing he is the one being promoted (except for Pike, who does not get one).

Just before the start of the parade the following night, Mrs Pike seeks comfort from the vicar over the fact that Wilson will be moving to Eastgate. Mainwaring then enters and Mrs Pike tries to convince him to reason with Wilson. Meanwhile, Jones arrives in the main hall and begins practising his own sergeant routine. After he is called to the office, the rest of the platoon begin to arrive for parade, each believing that they have been promoted to sergeant. Frazer enters first and then Walker a minute later (also with their own routines). The Verger asks them both separately to help him in the clock tower, so they take their jackets off because of the heat in the tower. Because they are asked separately, they do not see each other's stripes. As the last of the platoon arrives there is confusion. Exiting the office, Jones sees all the men with their three stripes, and returns to Mainwaring to utter the immortal question "I've fallen the Private in, what shall I do with the Sergeants?"

Later, just before Wilson leaves, he asks Mainwaring if he wants to see him off. Mainwaring refuses, and another war of words ensues. Composed, Wilson gives Mainwaring a goodbye salute and departs, with his former captain shouting after him, "At least I did my salutes properly! That salute was rotten!"

Just as Wilson is opening his new bank on Monday morning, the air raid siren sounds. All the staff move down to the shelter, and whilst they are down there, a bomb lands on the Eastgate bank, leaving it in ruins. A few days later West tells Mainwaring over the phone that head office has decided to close the Eastgate branch, with Mainwaring musing that it will go down in history as the shortest managerial appointment: Wilson was manager of a bank at 9 am, and five minutes later he had no bank to manage. Mainwaring then calls Wilson in and offers his condolences on losing his bank. Mainwaring reveals that he has arranged for Wilson to be transferred back to Walmington-on-Sea, and hands him a pair of Sergeants stripes for his uniform.

As Wilson leaves, he glances at the "G. Mainwaring, Manager" plate on Mainwaring's door, a look of disappointment on his face.

== Cast ==
- Arthur Lowe as Captain Mainwaring
- John Le Mesurier as Sergeant Wilson
- Clive Dunn as Lance Corporal Jones
- John Laurie as Private Frazer
- James Beck as Private Walker
- Arnold Ridley as Private Godfrey
- Ian Lavender as Private Pike
- Frank Williams as The Vicar
- Edward Sinclair as The Verger
- Janet Davies as Mrs. Pike
- Blake Butler as Mr. West
- Robert Raglan as Colonel Pritchard
- Arthur Brough as Mr. Boyle
- Colin Bean as Private Sponge
- Hugh Hastings as Private Hastings

== Notes ==
- This episode was repeated on BBC1 on 23 November 1983 as a tribute to John Le Mesurier following his death on 15 November.
- Mr West, who appears here played by Blake Butler, previously appeared in the Series 3 episode "Something Nasty in the Vault", played by Robert Dorning.
