= Big Guns (Dad's Army) =

- Dad's Army episode
- Episode no.: Series 3 Episode 7
- Directed by: David Croft
- Story by: Jimmy Perry and David Croft
- Original air date: 23 October 1969
- Running time: 30 minutes

Episode chronology
← Previous "Room at the Bottom"	Next → "The Day the Balloon Went Up"

"Big Guns" is the seventh episode of the third series of the British comedy series Dad's Army. It was originally transmitted on 23 October 1969. The episode was recorded Sunday 6 July 1969.

== Synopsis ==
The platoon is given heavy artillery and, directly in the line of fire of their naval gun, the town's bandstand is at grave risk.

== Plot ==
Captain Mainwaring and Sergeant Wilson are discussing a church parade in the Vicar's office when they are interrupted by the Verger, accompanied by an official from Pickfords, complaining that a large artillery gun has been left in the yard. It is revealed to be a 13 pounder naval gun and Mainwaring is very impressed. Jones explains that when he was in the Sudan, the only heavy weapons they used were Gatling guns. Mainwaring calls in Frazer, who was in the navy, to tell them how the gun works, but Frazer reveals that, despite being present at the Battle of Jutland and a chief petty officer, he was only a cook. Fortunately, the man from Pickfords returns with an instruction manual, and Mainwaring begins to read it.

The platoon is each assigned different positions, with amusing consequences. However, they cannot open the breech until the verger reveals that they had the safety catch on, to the indignation of the platoon. Eventually, as they attempt to rehearse the drill, Mainwaring calls out the range and inclination, but ends up standing directly in front of the gun's barrel, so when he gives the order to fire, Jones calls out "I wouldn't do that, sir!".

The next day, the platoon organise a TEWT (Tactical Exercise Without Troops) and make a miniature version of Walmington to test their new battle strategy, using, among other things, a powder puff, a scrubbing brush and a bottle of whisky. Mainwaring orders the destruction of the cricket scoreboard (much to Wilson's annoyance), the allotments (to Frazer's disapproval) and the bandstand (to the dismay of Jones, who reveals that he was present when it was erected and dedicated to Queen Victoria) within 48 hours. He tells Wilson he is meeting with Mr Rees, the Town Clerk, to confirm it. However, Mr Rees is less than pleased, and asks for a demonstration.

On the day of the demonstration, Jones and a sneezing Pike arrive with camouflage netting to put over the gun. After Mr Rees arrives, the platoon gather around the gun before Mainwaring gives the command "enemy tank right! Action!". The men jump to it, but as the gun is covered by the camouflage net, it proves to be the downfall of the platoon as they all become entangled in the net whilst attempting to remove it. Mr Rees has had enough at this point and promises to tell his committee that "they can sleep sound in their beds, provided they make them inside that enemy tank".

== Cast ==
- Arthur Lowe as Captain Mainwaring
- John Le Mesurier as Sergeant Wilson
- Clive Dunn as Lance Corporal Jones
- John Laurie as Private Frazer
- James Beck as Private Walker
- Arnold Ridley as Private Godfrey
- Ian Lavender as Private Pike
- Edward Sinclair as The Verger
- Edward Evans as Mr Rees, the Town Clerk
- Don Estelle as The Pickfords Man
- Roy Denton as Mr Bennett
