= Battle of the Giants! =

- Dad's Army episode
- Episode no.: Series 4 Episode 14
- Directed by: David Croft
- Story by: Jimmy Perry and David Croft
- Original air date: 27 December 1971
- Running time: 60 minutes

Episode chronology
← Previous "Fallen Idol"	Next → "Asleep in the Deep"

"Battle of the Giants!" is the first special Christmas episode of the British comedy series Dad's Army. It was originally transmitted on 27 December 1971. The episode was recorded 19 October 1971.

== Synopsis ==
After being insulted by Captain Square for his lack of medals, Captain Mainwaring challenges the Eastgate platoon to a test of initiative and fitness to prove who commands the better platoon.

== Plot ==
While Jones and the rest of the platoon hold a bayonet practice, Mainwaring and Wilson discuss the upcoming ceremonial church parade of all the Home Guard platoons in the area. A new officer's cap is delivered to Mainwaring, who hangs it on a hook on the door. Unfortunately, while charging at a dummy of Adolf Hitler, Pike bayonets the door, simultaneously puncturing Mainwaring's new hat. Mainwaring is incensed and shouts at Pike, while Wilson receives a telephone call from Mrs Mainwaring. He hands the phone to Mainwaring, claiming she heard him shouting. Mainwaring is forced to leave the parade to put back the bedding in the air-raid shelter, leaving Wilson in charge.

Captain Square arrives, and compliments Jones on his impressive row of medals. He goes into the office and confronts Wilson about a note he sent about the church parade, which stated that all medals should be worn. Wilson finds the note hidden under some other papers, and Square surmises that the reason he hid the letter is because Mainwaring has not got any medals, and he did not want to feel out of place. Square orders Wilson to read the letter to the platoon.

At the next parade, Mainwaring inspects the men, and is shocked to see that they are all wearing their medals (except for Pike, who has been forced by his mother to wear his Scout badges instead, and Walker who wears a medallion given to him for finding an escort for a sheikh visiting London). Mainwaring riles Wilson about the unimportance of medals and is even more disgusted when he learns that Chief ARP Warden Hodges, the Vicar and the Verger also have medals.

After the church parade, Square irks Mainwaring by saying that his platoon is "too old" to be of any real use. Mainwaring responds by claiming that his platoon could "wipe the floor" with his any day, because they are fitter, better trained and better led, and insults Square by saying that he has a "Colonel Blimp mentality". Square is angered and says that Mainwaring should prove that or apologise, and the Colonel suggests some initiative tests to settle the argument. Both Square and Mainwaring accept the challenge. Hodges, the Vicar and the Verger volunteer to be umpires.

Once they receive the details of the test, Mainwaring convenes a parade to discuss their plan of action. Walker tells Mainwaring that he has made separate flags for both platoons to fly at the top of a tower, to mark the end of the test. Frazer foresees a snag: while they are performing the test, Godfrey will still be trying to climb out of Jones' van and suggests that he breaks his leg to avoid going on the test, but Jones suggests that they carry Godfrey the way the natives carried Dr. Livingstone in Africa. Mainwaring agrees.

As the first part of the test, a race between the two platoon vans to the site of the initiative tests, gets underway, Jones suffers an attack of malaria, forcing them to pull over. Frazer recommends quinine, but Godfrey only has tonic wine in his Red Cross bag. As they set off again with Mainwaring taking over as driver, they realise they have been travelling in a circle, and the Eastgate van is catching them up. Mainwaring tries to stall them by swerving all over the road, but Hodges stops them, allowing the Eastgate platoon to get ahead. However, their van breaks down and Mainwaring's platoon resume their lead. To stall the Eastgate platoon, Mainwaring decides to release some sheep onto the road, but they eventually end up blocking the Walmington-on-Sea platoon, while the Eastgate platoon simply drive around the sheep and take the lead.

They eventually come to a halt on a bridge, with the Eastgate platoon approaching from one direction and the Walmington platoon arriving from the other. Neither commander is willing to back down, so both platoons get out and push their respective vehicles. Hodges arrives and is accidentally pushed into the river by Wilson. Mainwaring and Square rush to help but tell their respective Sergeants to let down the enemy's tyres, leaving them both stranded.

After they arrive, the first initiative test begins, which involves puncturing balloons with bayonets. The Eastgate platoon take the early lead, mainly thanks to a drunken Corporal Jones. However, Walker and Godfrey use their initiative by using a cigarette and a safety pin respectively. The final balloon floats away out of reach, but Mainwaring shoots it, and they quickly rush off.

The second initiative test begins, which involves carrying feathers from a tank to three barrels. Many ideas are suggested, but Pike comes up trumps by suggesting that they carry the barrels to the tank and fill them up from there. This works and gives them a huge advantage. Hodges attempts to stifle the platoon's effort by pulling the plug out of one of the boats they must use to cross the river, but Mainwaring and the platoon choose the other boat, leaving Hodges fuming. He rows over in a dinghy to fetch another boat, but it is revealed that Sergeant Parkins of the Eastgate platoon had removed the plug from the dinghy and tested it for the plugless boat, and Hodges ends up in the water again.

The platoon pass successfully through a battlefield, and successfully fire five rounds at the target, leaving them with just the flag to fly at the top of the tower, with still a huge margin for victory. However, their plans are temporarily scuppered when Mainwaring inadvertently pulls the rope off the flagpole. A still drunken Jones bravely, and successfully, shins along the pole and secures the rope again. However, he suffers another attack of malaria, giving the Eastgate platoon the opening they need to fly their flag. But Frazer notes that it is the Walmington platoon's flag they are flying, and Square is irate as the Walmington platoon has won.

The Eastgate platoon leave the tower in a huff, and Wilson prepares to chuck the Eastgate flag over the parapet, but Walker stops him. Mainwaring is shocked to learn that both flags are theirs. Walker offers up an excuse, but Mainwaring sees through him, knowing he did it on purpose. However, he is prepared to let him off because they won the contest.

== Cast ==
- Arthur Lowe as Captain Mainwaring
- John Le Mesurier as Sergeant Wilson
- Clive Dunn as Lance Corporal Jones
- John Laurie as Private Frazer
- James Beck as Private Walker
- Arnold Ridley as Private Godfrey
- Ian Lavender as Private Pike
- Bill Pertwee as ARP Warden Hodges
- Frank Williams as Vicar
- Edward Sinclair as Verger
- Geoffrey Lumsden as Captain Square
- Robert Raglan as The Colonel
- Charles Hill as Sergeant Parkins
- Colin Bean as Private Sponge
- Rosemary Faith as Shirley, the Barmaid

== Notes ==
1. Several scenes are frequently cut for this episode's repeats but are present in the 2007 Christmas DVD release. These include Private Walker's explanation of how he received his medal, and various incidents during the competition with the Eastgate platoon.
2. The slight blue haze around the overhead shots of Corporal Jones whilst he is climbing out on the flagpole and people on the ground below are visible, indicates it was recorded using Colour-separation overlay.
3. No new series of Dad's Army were made in 1971 as the team had been busy the previous year not only filming thirteen episodes of Series 4 but also spending six weeks filming the feature film, so the decision was made to have a break in 1971 and not to have a full series which would detract from the release of the feature film. Instead this Christmas Special was made. The series would return the following year with a full series.
4. Jones refers to "Pip, Squeak and Wilfred", the facetious nickname for the three service medals worn by those who served in World War I from 1914/15.
