= Put That Light Out! =

- Dad's Army episode
- Episode no.: Series 4 Episode 7
- Directed by: David Croft
- Story by: Jimmy Perry and David Croft; Based on an idea by Harold Snoad
- Original air date: 6 November 1970
- Running time: 30 minutes

Episode chronology
← Previous "Absent Friends"	Next → "The Two and a Half Feathers"

"Put That Light Out!" is the seventh episode of the fourth series of the British comedy series Dad's Army. It was originally transmitted on Friday 6 November 1970.

== Synopsis ==
The Walmington-on-Sea Home Guard are sent to guard the local lighthouse, and Corporal Jones is in charge.

== Plot ==
Mainwaring recently sent a letter to GHQ requesting the platoon's use of the local lighthouse as a guard house, and has just received permission to do so. Jones' section are the first to test this new guard house and prepare to move off that same evening. Walker is unable to attend because he is delivering some essential supplies, but the Lewis gun has been fixed, no questions asked.

They arrive at the lighthouse and set themselves up. They have been asked to stand guard from 8:00 in the evening to 2:00 in the morning, much to Godfrey's disappointment. He is suddenly taken short and has to go downstairs, as the nearest convenience is right at the bottom.

Jones asks Frazer to check on Godfrey, but he refuses. He tells the story of his school friend Wally Reagan. Wally had been asked to watch over a lighthouse and, one night, he heard a slithering and a moaning from downstairs. He had gone downstairs to investigate but had been scared back up because the "slithery thing" was following him up the stairs. He locked the door, but the "slithery thing" was trying to get in... Suddenly they hear a knocking on the door and scream, but it is only Godfrey.

They try the telephone, but they have been cut off. Frazer panics, and Pike reckons it is the "slithery thing" coming to get them. Jones takes control and pulls a switch. Suddenly, they hear a large moaning sound, and they realise they have turned the main lamp on, lighting up the whole town. They attempt to turn it off, hoping there is not an air raid that evening, just as the air raid siren sounds. They try to block out the light by holding a blanket up in front of it, but the heat from the lamp sets it on fire, forcing Pike to put it out with a fire extinguisher, coating Jones' trousers with foam in the process.

It is Wilson and a panicking Warden Hodges who discover the light, and inform Mainwaring and Mr Alberts, another ARP Warden, respectively. They discuss how to put it out, and Mainwaring suggests rowing out there. Mr Alberts says they will be dashed to pieces on the rocks, but Mainwaring does not care, until Mr Alberts says that there is no boat in the first place. Walker arrives with the Lewis Gun, and Hodges suggests shooting it out, but Mainwaring says it will kill the men in the lighthouse.

Walker suggests asking a friend of his at the power company to black out the entire county, but Mainwaring rebuffs the suggestion as it will draw too much attention, so instead they decide to put the nearby transformer out of action via the fuses, but only succeed in fusing the whole of the Jolly Roger Pier, but not the lighthouse. The disgruntled lighthouse keeper appears and informs them that it is powered by its own generator. As the telephone line to the lighthouse is cut off, Mainwaring rings the telephone exchange to try to get it reconnected but struggles to make himself plain to the lady at the exchange.

Walker talks to her and convinces her to reconnect the line, as the two of them used to work together during his pre-war smuggling activities. Mainwaring rings Jones, and tells him to go down to the generator room and turn off the lighthouse from there. However, they are taking a long time about it and Hodges soon hears the sound of German bombers approaching. He eventually persuades them to shoot the light with the Lewis Gun. Mainwaring declares that he himself will do it as they are his men and readies the gun, not knowing that Godfrey is in the way.

However, as Mainwaring is about to fire, the generator is shut down just in time. Hodges remarks that they have not heard the last of this, and Wilson adds that they will all be a lot poorer once GHQ learns about it. Mainwaring assures him there is no evidence of their activities, until Walker points out the results of them attacking the transformer: a destroyed tin hat, Mainwaring's soot-covered face and his cap falling apart.

== Cast ==
- Arthur Lowe as Captain Mainwaring
- John Le Mesurier as Sergeant Wilson
- Clive Dunn as Lance Corporal Jones
- John Laurie as Private Frazer
- James Beck as Private Walker
- Arnold Ridley as Private Godfrey
- Ian Lavender as Private Pike
- Bill Pertwee as ARP Warden Hodges
- Stuart Sherwin as Mr Alberts, 2nd ARP Warden
- Gordon Peters as the Lighthouse Keeper
- Avril Angers as Freda, the Telephone Operator

== Notes ==
1. This episode was based upon an idea by series director Harold Snoad.
