= Shooting Pains =

Episode of the British sitcom Dad's Army

- Dad's Army episode
- Episode no.: Series 1 Episode 6
- Directed by: David Croft
- Story by: Jimmy Perry and David Croft
- Original air date: 11 September 1968
- Running time: 30 minutes

Episode chronology
← Previous "The Showing Up of Corporal Jones"	Next → "Operation Kilt"

"Shooting Pains" is the sixth and final episode of the first series of the British comedy series Dad's Army. It was originally transmitted on Wednesday 11 September 1968.

== Synopsis ==
The Walmington-On-Sea platoon is selected to provide the guard of honour for Prime Minister Winston Churchill's visit to the review the area's coastal fortifications, but a poor show at the shooting range prompts the irascible Major Regan to consider using the Eastgate platoon instead. A shooting contest between Walmington and Eastgate will settle the matter.

== Plot ==
Captain Mainwaring and Sergeant Wilson are in the bank manager's office. Mainwaring is carrying a pistol on a ridiculous improvised holster, which is supposed to allow a fast draw, but it does not work when he tries a demonstration, and he is then subsequently forced to take the pistol out in order to sit down. They are discussing the upcoming shooting practice (the previous session was a disaster; the platoon having shot out all the tyres, including the spare, on the Major's car) when Mainwaring opens a letter from General Headquarters (GHQ). He reads it excitedly; it says that the Walmington platoon will be escorting the Prime Minister in a tour of local coastal defences. Mainwaring is very excited, implying the honour is based on his reputation, but Wilson drolly points out that the letter says it is only because they were the first platoon formed in the area. Mainwaring dismisses Wilson, and whilst fooling around with his pistol, discharges it accidentally at the same time as the secretary is bringing in the coffee, and the tray and its contents ends up going everywhere.

At the shooting practice, Corporal Jones, Private Pike, Private Walker and Private Frazer are sent by Regan to man the target equipment. Jones tells Pike to take charge of the flag, which is used to denote a miss, telling him to use it for every shot as no-one from the platoon will hit the target. Unbeknownst to Jones, Regan has decided to show them how it is done and is exasperated to get flagged a miss on every shot. Furious, he orders Mainwaring and Wilson down to the target and it is obvious he has hit near the centre of the target on every shot. Mainwaring is very annoyed and embarrassed by his men's behaviour.

After Private Godfrey has taken his shots and missed the target completely, Regan makes Mainwaring shoot using his pistol, but after nearly being knocked over by the recoil and spraying shots wildly, Regan says that not only did he not hit the target, but he also actually missed the firing range. Next, he forces Wilson to use a Tommy gun. Wilson is clearly terrified; he closes his eyes to do the shooting and is still shaking rhythmically long after the clip is emptied.

After the practice, the platoon return to the church hall, where Mrs Pike has made tea, sandwiches and some rather firm rock cakes. Major Regan enters the hall, and says that following the shooting practice, he had decided that the platoon were unfit to escort the Prime Minister. However, the Area Commander has given them a second chance in that there should be a shooting contest to determine which platoon should form the escort. After Regan leaves, Mainwaring is at a low ebb, fearing the worst for his platoon's chances. To cheer everyone up, Walker invites everyone to come to the hippodrome that evening to see the variety performance by "The Cheerful Chump", Charlie Cheeseman, a variety entertainer, in order to raise their spirits. Reluctantly, Wilson and Mainwaring agree to attend, spurred on by Mrs Pike.

At the performance, Cheeseman is telling some inappropriate jokes of the time and performing some songs. Wilson and Mainwaring are not enjoying it at all. After Cheeseman, the next act – Laura La Paz – performs some amazing feats of trick shooting. Subsequently, Walker disappears making his apologies. At the church hall the next morning Mainwaring and Wilson have been summoned by Walker who has recruited a new platoon member. Frazer is also there and tries to discuss something with the Captain, but is interrupted when Walker and Jones appear with a new platoon member – one Laura La Paz. Walker has "recruited" her to take part in the shooting range competition. Jones and Walker dress her in an ill-fitting uniform, bottle glasses and fake moustache as a disguise. Mainwaring and Wilson are unconvinced, but when Regan enters unexpectedly, Mainwaring is forced to introduce the new recruit whom Wilson hastily names "Private Paderewski".

Having gone first, the Eastgate platoon have set a high mark. Pike is first and has made a reasonable start, and it is now down to Private Paderewski. Unfortunately, though she hits the bull on her first shot from an unorthodox standing position, the next two she attempts to take in full trick shot mode but is made by Mainwaring to assume the proper prone firing position. As a result, the next shots are only "outers", putting the platoon behind. Taken aside, she explains she only ever practises doing her normal routine. Meanwhile, Frazer, who is last to shoot, hits five consecutive bulls, much to everyone's surprise. It turns out Frazer was not able to take part in practice as there was no more ammunition when it was his turn and that he is a crack shot from his days in World War I when he used to shoot at mines from a minesweeper.

A few days later, the platoon are seen being the honor guard for Winston Churchill.

== Cast ==
- Arthur Lowe as Captain Mainwaring
- John Le Mesurier as Sergeant Wilson
- Clive Dunn as Lance Corporal Jones
- John Laurie as Private Frazer
- James Beck as Private Walker
- Arnold Ridley as Private Godfrey
- Ian Lavender as Private Pike
- Barbara Windsor as Laura La Plaz / Private Paderewski
- Janet Davies as Mrs Pike
- Caroline Dowdeswell as Janet King
- Martin Wyldeck as Major Regan
- Jimmy Perry as Charlie Cheeseman
- Thérèse McMurray as Girl at the Window

== Notes ==
1. Co-writer Jimmy Perry performs a cameo appearance as the entertainer Charlie Cheeseman.
2. This episode was shown as part of the BBC's programmes commemorating the 50th anniversary of VE Day on 8 May 1995.
3. Despite being asked to fire five shots in rapid succession, Mainwaring actually shoots six, meaning his revolver has fired a magical seven shots, including his accidental first shot.
4. Despite being a key part of the plot, no-one from the Eastgate platoon appears in the episode.
5. Pike licks his thumb and wipes the foresight of his rifle before firing, explaining that "I saw Gary Cooper do it in a film once." Cooper did this in the 1941 film Sergeant York, including a scene at a firing range with sliding targets similar to those shown in this episode.
6. Although Frazer is shown to be an expert shot with a rifle due to experience shooting mines, in the later episode "Menace from the Deep" he is unable to destroy a floating mine with a Lewis gun.
7. This episode was planned for transmission on 4 September 1968, but was replaced by "The Showing Up of Corporal Jones", which was postponed from last Wednesday.
