= The Showing Up of Corporal Jones =

Episode of the British sitcom Dad's Army

- Dad's Army episode
- Episode no.: Series 1 Episode 5
- Directed by: David Croft
- Story by: Jimmy Perry and David Croft
- Original air date: 4 September 1968
- Running time: 30 minutes

Episode chronology
| ← Previous "The Enemy Within the Gates" | Next → "Shooting Pains" |

"The Showing Up of Corporal Jones" is the fifth episode of the first series of the British comedy series Dad's Army. It was originally transmitted on Wednesday 4 September 1968.

== Synopsis ==
When Major Regan from GHQ inspects the platoon he decides that Jones must resign, as he is too old. But he also says that if Jones can complete an assault course in 15 minutes he can stay. The platoon organise an elaborate plan to keep Jones amongst them.

== Cast ==
- Arthur Lowe as Captain Mainwaring
- John Le Mesurier as Sergeant Wilson
- Clive Dunn as Lance Corporal Jones
- John Laurie as Private Frazer
- James Beck as Private Walker
- Arnold Ridley as Private Godfrey
- Ian Lavender as Private Pike
- Janet Davies as Mrs Pike
- Martin Wyldeck as Major Regan
- Patrick Waddington as Brigadier
- Edward Sinclair as Caretaker
- Thérèse McMurray as Girl at the Window

== Notes ==
1. The platoon receive their uniforms in this episode.
2. This episode includes the only occasion Mainwaring says the word "bastard".
3. Strangely Wilson says "I've never heard you swear before, Sir" after Mainwaring says "Bloody cheek!" during The Lion Has Phones, an episode from Series 3 (1969), despite the fact he clearly hears Mainwaring say "the rotten bastard", initially thinking Mainwaring is directing the insult at him.
4. This episode was planned for transmission on 28 August 1968, but was replaced by "The Enemy Within the Gates", which was postponed from last Wednesday.
