= Mum's Army =

- Dad's Army episode
- Episode no.: Series 4 Episode 9
- Directed by: David Croft
- Story by: Jimmy Perry and David Croft
- Original air date: 20 November 1970
- Running time: 30 minutes

Episode chronology
← Previous "The Two and a Half Feathers"	Next → "The Test"

"Mum's Army" is the ninth episode of the fourth series of the British comedy series Dad's Army. It was originally transmitted on Friday 20 November 1970.

== Synopsis ==
Mainwaring's plans to involve the local women in the platoon become rather too personal.

== Plot ==
Mainwaring is convening a parade, and is growing fed up with Jones' slowness. Walker suggests nodding his head whenever he wants them to come to attention, and Jones will understand. Mainwaring dismisses this, but Jones takes it on board, standing to attention and standing at ease whenever Mainwaring nods his head.

Mainwaring informs the platoon that the women of Walmington-on-Sea want to join their platoon to help the war effort. He and Wilson thought that this was a good idea, as it would allow the men of the platoon to "grapple" with the enemy. Mainwaring suggests that they could serve in the canteen, and Frazer adds that they could sew on their jacket buttons. The platoon are asked to bring as many female volunteers as they can.

The next evening, Mainwaring enrols some of the women, including the flashy Marcia Fox, the quiet Ivy Samways, and the tarty Edith Parish, who were recruited by Jones, Pike and Walker respectively. Frazer informs Mainwaring that his recruit, Miss Ironside of the Gas Light and Coke Company, will be unavailable until tomorrow, as will Mrs Pike. As Wilson leaves to dismiss the parade, a lady of about middle age enters and introduces herself as Mrs Fiona Gray. Mainwaring is immediately smitten with her, and it is clear that his feelings are reciprocated; when taking Mrs Gray's information, Mainwaring unconsciously finds himself repeating some of Wilson's flirtatious lines (that he had used earlier when they interviewed some of the other ladies volunteering).

Mrs Gray is from London, she had to bring her mother down because the bombing was too much for her, and is now living in Wilton Gardens, not far from Mainwaring's house. She remarks that her life consists only of morning coffee, and making dahlias grow. Mainwaring admits he is fond of dahlias, but Elizabeth is not. As she prepares to depart, Mrs Gray asks Mainwaring to remove his glasses, telling him that she feels they take away the "warmth" in a person's face. When Mainwaring obliges her, she is clearly pleased, and Mainwaring is flattered.

The following parade Mainwaring teaches the women, who now include Miss Ironside and Mrs Pike, the rudiments of foot drill, including left turns, right turns, and the attention and at ease positions. He criticises everyone, except Mrs Gray, who is "very good". Walker passes several lewd remarks about Godfrey and the ladies, and is eventually ordered home.

Later, Mainwaring makes a visit to Anne's Pantry, a tea shop where he knows Mrs Gray regularly visits. Indeed, it is not long before she arrives, and Mrs Gray's order willingly joins Mainwaring's bill. However, while trying to have a quiet chat, they are interrupted by Godfrey, Jones, Walker, and eventually Pike, who informs Mainwaring that the bank inspectors have arrived, forcing Mainwaring to abandon his chat. Mainwaring leaves as the waitress returns, leaving Mrs Gray to pay for both coffees.

Later, Jones' section comments on Mainwaring's recent behaviour. Edith remarks that they went to the pictures together twice over the past week, and Pike says that they have coffee every morning together at the Dutch Oven, due to wagging tongues. Frazer thinks Mainwaring is making a fool of himself. Unbeknown to them, Wilson is listening, and decides to confront Mainwaring.

Wilson skirts round the subject, trying to subtly tell Mainwaring that he is making a fool of himself. However, Mainwaring misconstrues Wilson's incomprehensible speech, and announces that he is disbanding the ladies section, except for a few special helpers, which should, he believes, keep Mrs Pike out of Wilson's hair. Wilson is shocked.

Mainwaring notices that Mrs Gray is not on parade. Ivy tells Pike that she saw Mrs Gray head towards Walmington station with two heavy suitcases. Walker reminds Mainwaring that there is only one train at this time of the evening: the 8:40 to London, and Mainwaring quickly makes himself scarce. He confronts Mrs Gray at the station, admitting that he lives from one meeting to the next, and she confesses that she is exactly the same, and that is the reason why she is leaving. Mainwaring desperately implores her to stay, but Mrs Gray points out that people are beginning to talk about them; despite Mainwaring's claims that he does not care what other people think about them, Mrs Gray points out that he cannot afford scandal with his career at the bank (to which Mainwaring replies loudly "damn the bloody bank!", shocking her). Mainwaring continues to plead with her to stay, but a resolute Mrs Gray eventually boards the train. However, as the train steams off, she promises to write. As the train disappears, Mainwaring is left standing alone on the station, his face broken with hidden emotion as he quietly mouths the words "I love you".

== Cast ==
- Arthur Lowe as Captain Mainwaring
- John Le Mesurier as Sergeant Wilson
- Clive Dunn as Lance Corporal Jones
- John Laurie as Private Frazer
- James Beck as Private Walker
- Arnold Ridley as Private Godfrey
- Ian Lavender as Private Pike
- Carmen Silvera as Mrs Gray
- Janet Davies as Mrs Pike
- Wendy Richard as Edith Parish
- Pamela Cundell as Mrs Fox
- Julian Burbury as Miss Ironside
- Rosemary Faith as Ivy Samways
- Melita Manger as Waitress
- David Gilchrist as Serviceman
- Jack Le White as Porter

== Production ==
According to Ian Lavender on a 2015 programme about Arthur Lowe on BBC Radio 4 Extra, Do Tell Them Pike: Arthur Lowe on the Radio, Lowe insisted that Carmen Silvera, who had played Mrs Gray in the TV episode, should also be cast for the radio version, or else he would not record this episode.
