= Sons of the Sea (Dad's Army) =

- Dad's Army episode
- Episode no.: Series 3 Episode 14
- Directed by: David Croft
- Story by: Jimmy Perry and David Croft
- Original air date: 11 December 1969
- Running time: 30 minutes

Episode chronology
| ← Previous "No Spring for Frazer" | Next → "Resisting the Aggressor Down the Ages" |

"Sons of the Sea" is the fourteenth and final episode of the third series of the British comedy series Dad's Army. It was originally transmitted on 11 December 1969.

== Synopsis ==
When the bank inherits a boat, the platoon is able to mount a river patrol – and ends up lost in the English Channel.

== Plot ==
Mr Maxwell, the solicitor for the late Mr Johnson, tells Mainwaring and Wilson that Mr Johnson left nothing of value except "the clothes he stood up in", and his boat The Naughty Jane. Wilson adds that Mr Johnson's account was overdrawn to the extent of £33 12s 6d. Mainwaring reveals that this means the boat becomes the property of the bank, and can be used to offset the overdraft.

Just as Mr Maxwell leaves, Mainwaring has an idea, much to Wilson's panic: the platoon can use that boat for river patrols and tells him that "half a dozen determined men, armed to the teeth, can play havoc with the Nazis" if they invaded. Wilson tells Mainwaring that the platoon "work hard enough as it is", and deserve a rest. Mainwaring tells Wilson that he only wants to test it out and decides to call for volunteers. He chooses Jones, Pike, Walker, Desmond, Godfrey and Frazer.

They hold a practice in the church hall using chairs and mops. Mainwaring's lack of nautical knowledge annoys Frazer, who holds the most claim to being an experienced sailor. It is not long before they get it out on the open water. Mainwaring says they will row to the mouth of the river and turn back. However, it soon turns foggy, and Mainwaring decides to turn round. It is not long before Mainwaring takes charge completely, and Frazer goes into a sulk.

Night falls, and Mainwaring assumes they must be well up-stream by now. Pike is ill, and wants a drink; Walker scoops some water with his forage cap and gives it to Pike, who promptly spits it out because it is salty. At that moment, the group realise they are in the middle of the English Channel. Frazer refuses to help, still stung after being spurned by Mainwaring, so the men have to come up with their own ideas, with little success. Mainwaring is proud of the men's loyalty, and Frazer, realising his stupidity, apologises to Mainwaring, and he accepts his apology. Mainwaring asks him where the North is, but Frazer does not know either.

As dawn breaks, Jones hears voices from the shore. Elated, the men row into the shore, and prepare to call out, but are interrupted by French singing (in fact, French Canadian pilots celebrating a successful mission in a nearby pub). Mainwaring believes that they must have drifted to France. The platoon sneak ashore, then hide in an empty railway truck and make themselves comfortable, so they can escape the next night.

Later, Jones is woken by the sound of wheels turning, and is shocked when he opens the truck door and sees the train moving. He alerts Mainwaring, who in turn wakens the platoon, and they prepare to jump off, stop by stop, and make their way back to the coast to get back to England. They throw their rifle bolts and the Lewis gun's butterfly spring out of the door, stuff their hats and jackets up their tunics and exchange goodbyes. As the train stops, they open the door, and spot a man on the station. Using schoolboy French, they attempt to bluff their way out of it, and the puzzled man tells them that they are at Eastbourne station, much to the men's relief.

Wilson gets the idea of heading back to Walmington-on-Sea by train for lunch, but Mainwaring bursts his bubble by reminding him that they have to retrieve their rifle bolts and they set off back down the tracks.

== Cast ==
- Arthur Lowe as Captain Mainwaring
- John Le Mesurier as Sergeant Wilson
- Clive Dunn as Lance Corporal Jones
- John Laurie as Private Frazer
- James Beck as Private Walker
- Arnold Ridley as Private Godfrey
- Ian Lavender as Private Pike
- Michael Bilton as Mr. Maxwell
- John Leeson as 1st Soldier
- Jonathan Holt as 2nd Soldier
- Ralph Ball as Man on Station
- Desmond Cullum-Jones as Private Desmond
