= The Man and the Hour =

Episode of the British sitcom Dad's Army

- Dad's Army episode
- Episode no.: Series 1 Episode 1
- Directed by: David Croft
- Written by: Jimmy Perry; David Croft
- Original air date: 31 July 1968
- Running time: 30 minutes

Guest appearances
- Janet Davies as Mrs Pike; Caroline Dowdeswell as Janet King; John Ringham as Private Adam Bracewell; Bill Pertwee as ARP Warden Hodges; Neville Hughes as Soldier; Jack Wright as Despatch Rider

Episode chronology
← Previous —	Next → "Museum Piece"

"The Man and the Hour" is the first episode of the British television sitcom Dad's Army. It was written by Jimmy Perry and David Croft, and was first broadcast on 31 July 1968. It was later adapted for radio.

== Synopsis ==
At the outbreak of the Second World War, a local bank manager, George Mainwaring, takes it upon himself to form a unit of Local Defence Volunteers in the Sussex town of Walmington-on-Sea.

== Plot ==
The episode begins in the then-present day (1968), with local Walmington-on-Sea dignitary George Mainwaring announcing that he is backing Britain. A flashback appears on a 1940s TV screen showing scenes from the Second World War and the Army.

It then reverts to Swallows Bank (1940), Walmington-on-Sea. George Mainwaring and his clerks, Arthur Wilson and Frank Pike, are laying sandbags at the window. Mainwaring then receives a message saying that he can set up a LDV unit to protect Britain. He finds out more about this on the wireless, having been told by a clerk, Janet King, that Anthony Eden is about to make a Ministerial broadcast. Pike is told to go round to all the LDV volunteers and tell them to meet in the church hall.

At the church hall, many people are waiting and Mainwaring (now the self-appointed commander) begins to enroll them. He makes Wilson his sergeant and Jones his lance-corporal. ARP warden Hodges bursts in and tells the commander to "shove off" because he needs the hall for an ARP lecture. Mainwaring is forced to let Hodges use it and instructs the platoon to meet in the hall later.

Later, Captain Mainwaring and Sergeant Wilson are inspecting the platoon, Godfrey has a gun and Mainwaring believes that he should have it because he is the officer, but Godfrey refuses. The platoon are told about tanks and how to defeat them. The men play at being tanks and how to destroy them. Frank's mother, Mavis, arrives to pick up Frank because it's his bedtime. The uniform (armbands) and weapons (pepper) arrive and are handed out. It is not what the platoon expected. Mainwaring gives a speech and the platoon cheer.

== Cast ==
- Arthur Lowe as Captain Mainwaring
- John Le Mesurier as Sergeant Wilson
- Clive Dunn as Lance Corporal Jones
- John Laurie as Private Frazer
- James Beck as Private Walker
- Arnold Ridley as Private Godfrey
- Ian Lavender as Private Pike
- Janet Davies as Mrs Pike
- Caroline Dowdeswell as Janet King
- John Ringham as Private Adam Bracewell
- Bill Pertwee as ARP Warden Hodges
- Neville Hughes as Soldier
- Jack Wright as Despatch Rider

== Production ==
=== Casting ===
This episode featured the first regular appearances of Arthur Lowe as Captain George Mainwaring, John Le Mesurier as Sergeant Arthur Wilson, Clive Dunn as Lance Corporal Jack Jones, John Laurie as Private James Frazer, Arnold Ridley as Private Charles Godfrey, Ian Lavender as Private Frank Pike and James Beck as Private Joe Walker.

=== Development ===
"The Man and the Hour" served as the pilot episode for the series, introducing the characters and premise. An early version of this episode ran at 35 minutes long, which was too long for the standard assigned half-hour broadcast slot. Thus, the series was delayed from its originally planned debut in order to find a suitable thirty-five-minute slot. However, the episode was eventually edited down into standard half-hour length to begin broadcast on 31 July 1968.

The deleted scenes mostly introduced the various characters more fully, and including an additional altercation between Mainwaring and Hodges, which suggests the feud between the pair had been running for many years prior. Hodges states that, after Mainwaring "pompously" turned him down for a loan several years prior, in a time of war, Hodges will rise to the top of the local hierarchy and that Mainwaring will soon be indebted to him. It is unknown if these extra scenes or the original 35-minute version still exist in the BBC archive.

The episode, and thus the series, begins with a pre-opening credits scene set in the (then) modern day, with the characters, older, gathered at a meal with Mainwaring announcing that he is backing Britain (it is also subtly hinted but not confirmed, that this may be his retirement party from his role of bank manager), as a television set by the characters shows scenes from the Second World War, leading into the opening credits and the series proper. This is the only episode of the series to have a pre-opening credits scene, and the series never returned to the modern day. The scene is not recreated in the radio adaptation.

This was the only Dad's Army episode to feature an audience laughter track during the opening titles.

=== Filming ===
When filming began, the original script was seven minutes too long, so a scene involving the fire brigade wanting to use the hall for practice was rehearsed but not filmed.

=== Broadcast ===
Due to the episode overrunning, the series was delayed from its originally planned debut on Wednesday, 5 June 1968 in order to find a suitable thirty-five-minute slot. However, the episode was eventually edited down into standard half-hour length to begin broadcast on 31 July 1968, although the episode was originally planned for broadcast on 5 June 1968 but was put back for UEFA Euro 1968.

== Radio episode ==
In the TV episode, when asked his occupation, Frazer replies "I keep a philatelist's shop." Later in the series this is dropped and Frazer is suddenly the local undertaker instead. In order to explain this changing of occupation (as well as retain the "How do you spell that?" joke), the radio episode changes this to Frazer having two occupations, he is the undertaker and also keeps a philatelists shop.

== Reception ==
The day after the episode aired, Ron Boyle from The Daily Express wrote that, while he did not "raise a good hearty belly-laugh", he believed that "the BBC [was] about to come up with a classic comedy series". Boyle admired how the episode "mercifully avoided all the tempting cliché traps", and believed that the series would be successful, stating that the possibilities for the series were "tremendous". He wrote: "The more I think of it I don't see how this series can fail."
