= Chief ARP Warden Hodges =

Fictional British television character

- Dad's Army character
- Bill Pertwee as Warden Hodges in "The Captain's Car"
- First appearance: "The Man and the Hour"; (1968)
- Last appearance: "Never Too Old"; (1977)
- Created by: Jimmy Perry; David Croft
- Portrayed by: Bill Pertwee (TV series); Martin Savage (2016 film); Simon Ludders (2019 remakes)

In-universe information
- Full name: William Hodges
- Occupation: Greengrocer
- Affiliation: ARP Wardens
- Family: Hamish (nephew); Sylvia (niece)
- Nationality: British

Chief ARP Warden William Hodges, commonly known as "Hodges", is a fictional greengrocer and chief air raid warden first portrayed by Bill Pertwee in the British television sitcom Dad's Army. Created by series writers Jimmy Perry and David Croft, Hodges served as Captain Mainwaring's main rival in the series, and was noted for his catchphrases "Ruddy hooligans!" and "Put that light out!".

He appeared throughout all nine series of the sitcom, which ran from 1968 to 1977. He later reprised his role of Hodges for the radio sequel series It Sticks Out Half a Mile, which ran from 1983 to 1984.

== Concept and creation ==
Bill Pertwee was offered the role of Hodges in the summer of 1968, when he received a phone call from series co-writer David Croft, asking whether he wished to appear as an air raid warden with two lines in a new sitcom called Dad's Army. Pertwee described this as being a "key moment in my career".

In a 1998 interview with Dave Homewood, the founder of the New Zealand branch of the Dad's Army Appreciation Society, Pertwee explained that co-writers Jimmy Perry and David Croft introduced the character of Hodges because "they wanted an anti-Mainwaring character" who could "break his pomposity".

Pertwee went on to explain that the writers "wanted someone to stir Mainwaring up, and someone who lived in Walmington-on-Sea: that was the idea. A tradesman and a bit of a chap who rushed in and did a lot of shouting and so forth".

== Appearances ==
=== Dad's Army ===
Warden Hodges, as portrayed by Bill Pertwee, appeared in 60 episodes of Dad's Army from 1968 to 1977. His first appearance was in the first episode of the series, titled "The Man and the Hour", and his final appearance was in the series' final episode, "Never Too Old". Initially, Hodges was a regular ARP warden, but from "The Armoured Might of Lance Corporal Jones" until the series' end, he was promoted to a chief air raid warden. Bill Pertwee also appeared as Hodges in the Dad's Army radio series, the stage show, and the 1971 feature film.

Martin Savage played Warden Hodges in the 2016 feature film, while Simon Ludders portrayed Hodges in Dad's Army: The Lost Episodes in 2019.

=== It Sticks Out Half a Mile ===
From 1983 to 1984, Pertwee reprised his role of Hodges in the radio sequel series It Sticks Out Half a Mile. No longer an ARP warden, but still a greengrocer in Walmington-on-Sea, he appeared in all thirteen episodes of the series.

== Characterisation ==
=== Dad's Army ===
Born in 1893, Hodges is a crude, brash and meanspirited greengrocer. Following the outbreak of war, Hodges has become the air raid warden (later chief air raid warden) of the fictional Walmington-on-Sea. The position has given him considerable power which has gone to his head. He is an uncouth and coarse man, at times as pompous and officious as his chief rival Captain Mainwaring, and delights in antagonising the Home Guard platoon, in particular Mainwaring, whom he frequently refers to as "Napoleon".

Hodges shares an intense rivalry with Mainwaring and his platoon, and views them as ineffective old men. In several episodes, Hodges and his co-conspirator, the Verger, attempt to sabotage the platoon's efforts, usually at the command of Captain Square, the platoon leader of the rival Home Guard outfit in the fictional Eastgate. Hodges's feelings towards both Mainwaring and his own wartime responsibilities are summarised in the episode "Time on My Hands", when, while Mainwaring is stuck up a townhall clock tower, Hodges shouts: "I hope you stay up there to let me enjoy this war in peace. Because I do enjoy this war. I've never enjoyed anything as much in all my life... And you! You always spoil it." As a result of his resentment for Mainwaring and his platoon, they also greatly dislike Hodges, voicing their contempt for him throughout the series. Godfrey describes him as a "rude, common and nasty fellow", and Pike often encourages Mainwaring to shoot Hodges at any flimsy excuse (and Mainwaring never discourages these suggestions). Hodges is also greatly disliked by the Walmington-on-Sea residents.

The character often attempts to take charge of important situations under the justification that it is an "ARP matter". However, Hodges displays a cowardly streak, and is quick to transfer command back to Mainwaring if his life becomes at risk. In several episodes, Hodges refers to having "funny turns", which hints that he may have a neurological condition. Hodges fought in the First World War, where he learned to speak German as a prison guard, while also developing an intense dislike for Americans. In "The Recruit", it is revealed that Hodges has a Scottish nephew called Hamish, who calls Hodges "Uncle Willie". He also has a niece called Sylvia, who appears in "The Making of Private Pike".

Despite his hostility toward the platoon, Hodges has sided with them in times of need, such as in the episode "Wake Up Walmington". Occasionally, he reveals a softer side to his character, such as when he shows concern for a captured German soldier, and there are times when he is shown to possess hidden talents, for example, being a fine cricketer.

In 1998, Bill Pertwee described Hodges as being "an over the top character. A bit of a bumbling fool, and probably a coward, don't you think? I mean it was a great piece of writing, because they wrote the character over the top so that he wasn't just accepted as a villain, he was accepted as a bit of an idiot. I think that probably describes him." He went on to add that Hodges "wasn't a straightforward villain. He was just like a naughty boy causing a lot of trouble."

=== It Sticks Out Half a Mile ===
In the radio sequel series It Sticks Out Half a Mile, Hodges is still a greengrocer at Walmington-on-Sea. He becomes interested in renovating a seaside pier in the nearby Frambourne-on-Sea and enters a business partnership with Frank Pike to renovate the pier. Later in the series, he is revealed to be married, to a bossy woman called Beatrice. He also had a past love interest with a woman called Myrtle Spivy. They went on holiday to Bognor Regis in the summer of 1929. Hodges went to get her a drink, and never came back.

In 1998, Bill Pertwee admitted that his character was "very different" in this series, and agreed that he had become a "bit less rough". In this series, Hodges's first name has changed from William to Bert.

== Medals ==
Although Warden Hodges rarely wore his ribbons, he was awarded the usual trio of First World War campaign medals (commonly known as "Pip, Squeak and Wilfred"). (Note: The 1914–15 Star, the British War Medal and the Victory Medal, nicknamed Pip, Squeak and Wilfred after a trio of cartoon characters of the period.)

== In popular culture ==
Warden Hodges is referenced in the song "Descent of the Stiperstones" by English rock band Half Man Half Biscuit. To mark Dad's Army's fiftieth anniversary, the Royal Mail issued a set of eight stamps in June 2018. These featured the main characters and their catchphrases, including Hodges's "Put that light out!". In addition, several bobbleheads of the Dad's Army characters have been created by Big Chief Studios, including one of Hodges.
