= Edward Sinclair (actor) =

English actor (1914–1977)

- Sinclair as the Verger Maurice Yeatman in Dad's Army
- Born: Edward Sinclair Perry; 3 February 1914; Oldham, Lancashire
- Died: 29 August 1977 (aged 63); Cheddar, Somerset, England
- Occupation: Comedy actor
- Years active: 1969–1977
- Spouse: Gladys Green (m. 1940)

Edward Sinclair Perry (3 February 1914 – 29 August 1977) was an English actor who played the role of the verger, Maurice Yeatman, in Dad's Army. He also made appearances in Z-Cars, Danger Man.

== Career ==
His first appearance in Dad's Army was in 1969, the fifth episode (before audiences had been introduced to the Vicar) as the caretaker, playing the verger from the second series.

He also appeared in several films and theatre productions, and was due to perform in the Christmas panto Ugly Sisters, in 1977, but died soon after from a heart attack, while on holiday in Cheddar, Somerset. This came as a shock to the cast, and it was Arthur Lowe who stated at his funeral service, "With the loss of Teddy, it is now quite clear that there will be no more Dad's Army."

He was born and married as Edward Sinclair, although his death was registered as Edward Sinclair Perry.

== Selected filmography ==
- The Magic Christian (1969) – Park Attendant (uncredited)
- Dad's Army (1971) – Verger Maurice Yeatman
- No Sex Please, We're British (1973) – Postman
- David Copperfield (1974) - Mr Barkis
