= Lance Corporal Jones =

Fictional television character

- Dad's Army character
- First appearance: The Man and the Hour
- Last appearance: Never Too Old
- Portrayed by: Clive Dunn (TV series); Clive Dunn and Jack Haig (stage show); Tom Courtenay (2016 film); Kevin Eldon (Dad's Army: The Lost Episodes)

In-universe information
- Occupation: Butcher
- Relatives: George Jones (father); Mildred Fox (wife); Unnamed brother Unnamed sister
- Affiliated with: Home Guard

Lance Corporal Jack Jones is a fictional Home Guard platoon lance corporal and veteran of the British Empire, first portrayed by Clive Dunn in the BBC television sitcom Dad's Army. His catchphrases are "Don't panic!", "Permission to speak, sir?" and "They don't like it up 'em!". Jones also often recounts, at length, his past military experiences, particularly those in Sudan and India and gives a glimpse to the military traditions and events in the concluding years of the 19th century.

== Fictional biography ==
The backstory invented for Jones suggests that he was born in 1870 in Walmington-on-Sea, the son of George Jones, who by the start of World War II is the 88-year-old caretaker of the Peabody Museum of Historical Army Weapons. In "The Showing Up of Corporal Jones", when Major Regan asks him his age, Jones replies sixty, but tells Captain Mainwaring later in the same episode his actual age, which is seventy. Jack Jones joined the army as a drummer boy in 1884; thereafter, he served in five military campaigns – the Gordon Relief Expedition to the Sudan (1884–1885), the Anglo-Egyptian Reconquest of the Sudan (1896–1899), the Boer War (1899–1901), where after that he was promoted to Lance Corporal, and the First World War (1914–1918) (declaring in "The Deadly Attachment" that, "I haven't had this much fun since I was in the trenches in 1916!" although he states in the episode The Man and the Hour he had been invalided out of the army in 1915).

Occasionally he mentions fighting the Pathans on the North-West Frontier (his medal ribbons imply service on the Frontier in 1895-98 (Note: Ribbon for the India Medal, 1895–1902) and 1908). (Note: Ribbon for the India General Service Medal, 1909) In the episode "The Two and a Half Feathers" he mentions that he served in the Royal Warwickshire Regiment, while in "The Bullet Is Not for Firing" he startles his khaki clad colleagues by appearing at a court of enquiry in the pre-1914 scarlet and blue full dress uniform of the regiment, complete with two rows of medals. While some characters, such as Major Regan, comment on Jones' medals as a way of critiquing his age and fitness for service in the Home Guard, others such as Captain Square (from the rival Eastgate platoon) are quite complimentary; at one point Square (himself a veteran campaigner) tells Jones that he has "an illuminated history of the British Empire" on his chest.

During his service on the Western Front, he says that he was known as the Mad Bomber, due to his inclination to throw grenades madly. He was invalided out of the army in 1915 because of his poor eyesight, as he said in the first episode "The Man and the Hour". Ιn the same episode he mentions that the last 14 years of his career he was a Lance Corporal. So it means that he was promoted to this rank in 1901, after the Boer War. He also claims that he once formed part of a Guard of Honour for Queen Victoria. During the episode "Battle of the Giants!" Jones gets an attack of malaria, which he probably picked up during his service in Africa. Despite his advanced age, Jones reveals that both his parents are still alive and well. It is also stated in the episode "Room at the Bottom", that Jones is a member of the Royal Antediluvian Order of Buffaloes.

At the outbreak of the Second World War, Jones was working as the town butcher. (The address of his shop was mentioned in the episode "A Brush with the Law" as being 19 High Street, Walmington-on-Sea.) He was so keen to join the Local Defence Volunteers that, despite his age (70), Captain Mainwaring instantly appointed him as the platoon's lance corporal. However, it is suggested that Jones' ability to provide off-the-ration meat may have had rather more to do with this decision than his physical and mental abilities, which were declining somewhat due to his age. His vision, for example, was so poor that when signing up for duty, he initially signed the table instead of the form.

In many episodes, Jones fondly recalls his participation in the Battle of Omdurman in the Sudan, facing the "Fuzzy Wuzzies" under the command of General Kitchener. As an aged veteran, he is extremely fond of bayonet warfare ("the cold steel"), and usually meets any queries about this with the assertion that "they don't like it up 'em!", a phrase which writer Jimmy Perry remembered an old campaigner using, during his own service in the Home Guard.

It is also noted that Jones once kept wicket behind the great cricketer Ranjitsinhji, who was "an Indian gentleman and upstanding man" until he "whipped his bails off".

== Age and health ==
It is a bit of a puzzle as to how old Jones is. In the fifth episode of series one ("The Showing Up of Corporal Jones"), he tells Major Regan (who is inspecting the platoon) that he is sixty years old. Yet later in the same episode, he tells Captain Mainwaring that he is "only" seventy. But in the last episode of series four ("Fallen Idol"), he says that he is not sixty yet. Yet Walker says that due to all of the military activities Jones keeps claiming that he took part in, he must be over ninety. Jones contracted malaria during his military service in Egypt and the Sudan in the Season 4 Episode 14 extended Christmas special "Battle of the Giants!" he gets a bout of it and says he had it for nearly forty years.

== Character traits ==
Jones is known for a number of eccentric traits, such as using long, rambling explanations and anecdotes whenever he wants to make a point. He is also invariably one step behind the rest of the platoon in any drill manoeuvre. This is apparently a trait he has had throughout his military career; a fellow veteran, named George Clarke, remembered Jones by this trait in the series 4 episode "The Two and a Half Feathers". Only twice was Jones witnessed to be in step with the platoon, once after a whole year's practice; but he quickly reverted to form. The next time was when the whole platoon took the extra second Jones always does to respond to make them look orderly. He often makes far-fetched suggestions, such as advising that they chop off the German prisoners' trouser buttons, on the grounds that if they escaped, a group of men walking through the town with their trousers around their ankles might cause people to "raise some inquiries". Every time, Jones' suggestions are soundly refuted by Mainwaring with a curt "I think you're wandering into the realms of fantasy, Jones." Jones is notably brave, eagerly volunteering for even the most suicidal of missions: for example, when the platoon was discussing torture, he declared loudly and excitedly that the platoon should torture him to see what they were up against. In this instance he failed to calm down when grabbed by other members of the platoon, only returning to normal after being slapped by Frazer. Jones uses odd turns of phrase such as "It would be more tasty for us to tell him" (instead of "tasteful"), and "I would go through fire and brimstone and treacle for you, sir".

Despite his advanced years and physical failings, Jones is extremely excitable and active. Whenever action or danger is imminent he becomes near-hysterical and runs around frantically shouting, "Don't panic! DON'T PANIC!" at the top of his voice (usually at some inappropriate moment, such as when holding an armed landmine or hand grenade) until someone manages to calm him down to a state in which he is useful. This is often not evidence of fear, however, but of extreme eagerness: a courageous man, Jones is always the first to volunteer for any activity (regardless of any potential danger) and is extremely keen when doing so: he is known to sulk if someone else is chosen (the one time he did not volunteer, Frazer accused him of only volunteering to impress Captain Mainwaring – who was not with them – and infuriated Jones into volunteering after all). If awoken suddenly from sleep, or if someone tries to take his bayonet, Jones will attempt to strangle the culprit, for which he profusely apologises afterwards.

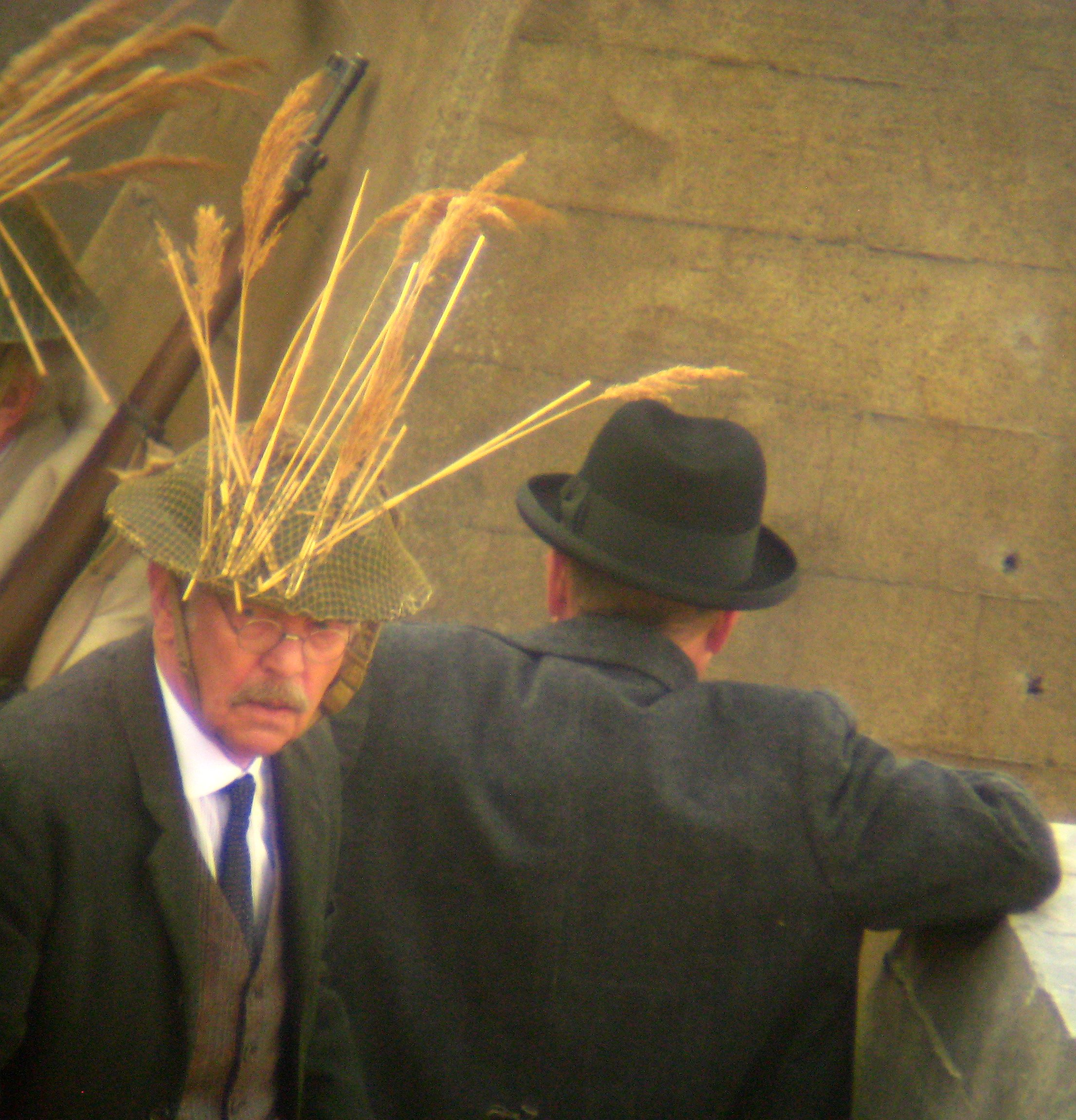
Tom Courtenay in the role of Corporal Jones in the 2016 Dad's Army film.

In one episode, "The Two and a Half Feathers" Jones has to confront his past when a former comrade from the Sudan, Private Clarke, joins the Walmington-on-Sea platoon. Clarke accuses Jones of leaving him to die, following an incident many years before in which both men were attacked and kidnapped by dervishes. After his courage is doubted by the town and the platoon, Jones later vindicates himself with the true story of what happened (which he had nobly held back to spare a third party unnecessary pain or scandal). After Jones reveals the truth, Clarke later flees without explanation, leaving Jones' honour and respect intact.

The platoon uses Jones' delivery van as transport and improvised IFV for their manoeuvres. Jones is very proud of his van, and is often reluctant to allow various modifications needed for the platoon's activities. The instances when Mainwaring causes the van to get damaged are the very rare occasions when Jones becomes upset with the captain, at one point threatening to blacklist Mainwaring from his sausage list; to which Mainwaring replied carefully "Steady Jones". However Mainwaring generally dismisses the matter, insisting "There's a war on!". As well as keeping Mainwaring and Wilson buttered up with bribes of meat, Jones often does the same with various other townsfolk when needed. His assistant in the shop is "my boy Raymonde", with the accent on the "e".

== Relationships ==
Jones appears to have reasonably good relationships with both Mainwaring and Wilson, whom he often bribes with meat when he wants his own way. Although Jones' over-keen and sometimes bungled efforts sometimes annoy Mainwaring, the captain is nonetheless admiring of his ever-enthusiastic approach, and considers him one of his best men, often discussing matters with him and Wilson before addressing the rest of the platoon. In an episode where an unexploded bomb is stuck at the top of a telegraph pole after an air raid, Jones volunteers to climb up and retrieve it, causing Mainwaring to say that Jones is "brave as a lion, if every one of our men were like him no one could stop us." His relationship with Mainwaring is also doubtlessly improved by Jones' tendency to flatter his superior officer and remains steadfastly loyal to him. However, there have been few occasions where Jones has shown doubt and even mistrust towards Mainwaring. Notably in the episode "The King was in His Counting House", Jones disdains Mainwaring's claim that his father was a renowned tailor and member of "The Master Tailors' Guild", by revealing that Mainwaring's father merely owned a "poky little drapery shop up a side alley" and sold poor-quality workman's trousers. His main rivalries are with Frazer, and the Verger, whom he often calls a troublemaker.

On informal occasions, Jones is often accompanied by Mrs Fox, his love-interest. Mrs Fox is a busty middle-aged widow, and a regular customer at Jones' butcher's shop. He has also been known to court the attention of Mrs. Prosser on occasion. In the final episode Jones and Mrs. Fox get married.

== Military service ==
Jones is seen throughout the series wearing his ribbon bars which recognise his previous service in the British Army. From the beginning of series 4 they are as follows: (Note: Jones wears these medal ribbons from the first episode of series 4, "The Big Parade", filmed in 1970.)

1. Egypt Medal (1882–1889)
2. Indian General Service Medal (1895–1902)
3. Queen's Sudan Medal (1897)
4. Queen's South African War Medal (1899–1902)
5. King's South African War Medal (1901–1902)
6. India General Service Medal (1909)
7. 1914 Star (or 1914–15 Star)
8. British War Medal
9. Allied Victory Medal
10. Army Long Service and Good Conduct Medal (with 1916 ribbon)
11. Khedive's Star (1882–1891)
12. Khedive's Sudan Medal
