= Bressingham Steam and Gardens =

Steam museum and gardens visitor attraction in Norfolk, England

Coordinates: 52.3846°N 1.0571°E

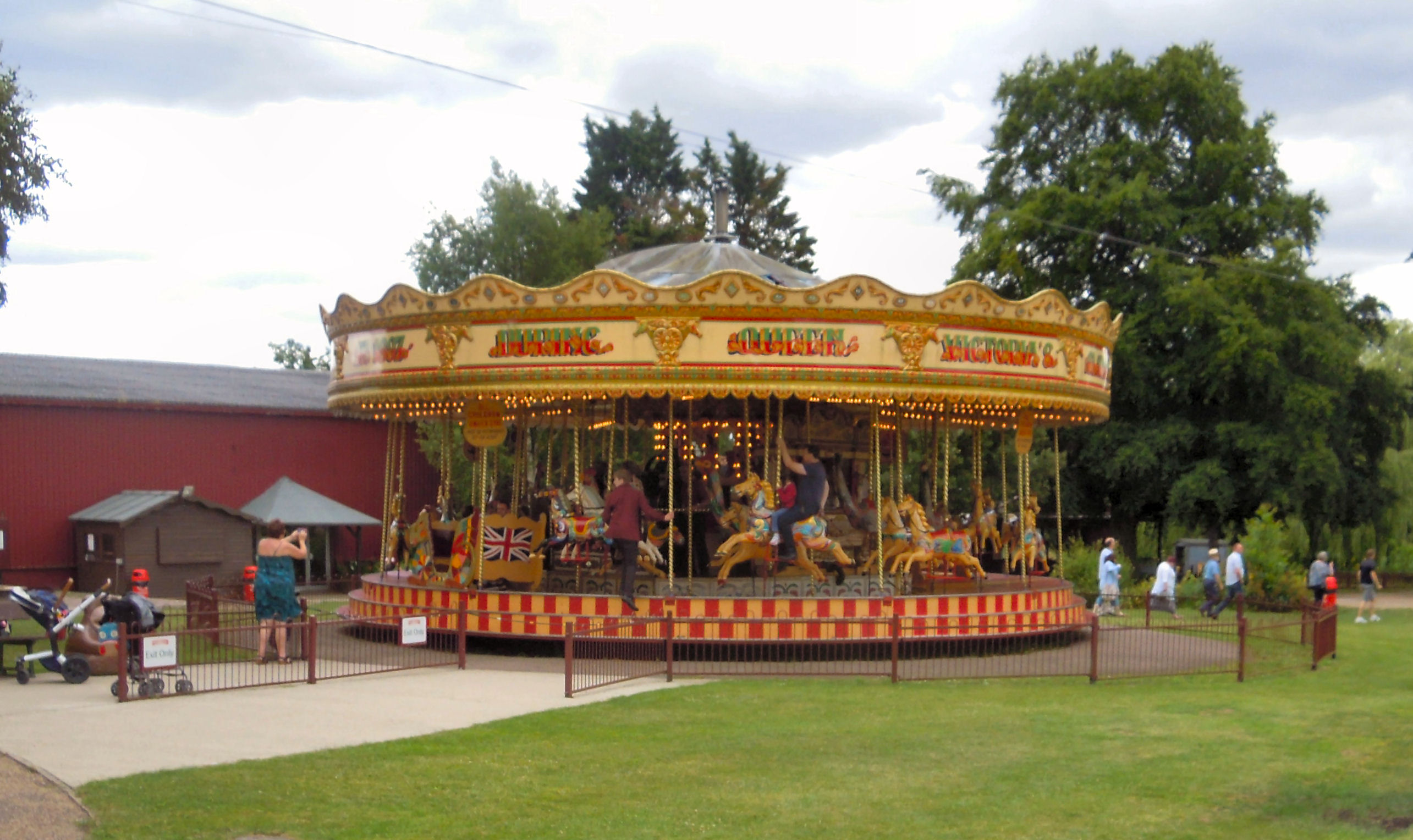
The gallopers at Bressingham

Bressingham Steam & Gardens is a steam museum and gardens located at Bressingham (adjacent to a garden centre), west of Diss in Norfolk, England. The site has several narrow gauge rail lines and a number of types of steam engines and vehicles in its collection and is also the home of a Dad's Army exhibition.

== The gardens ==
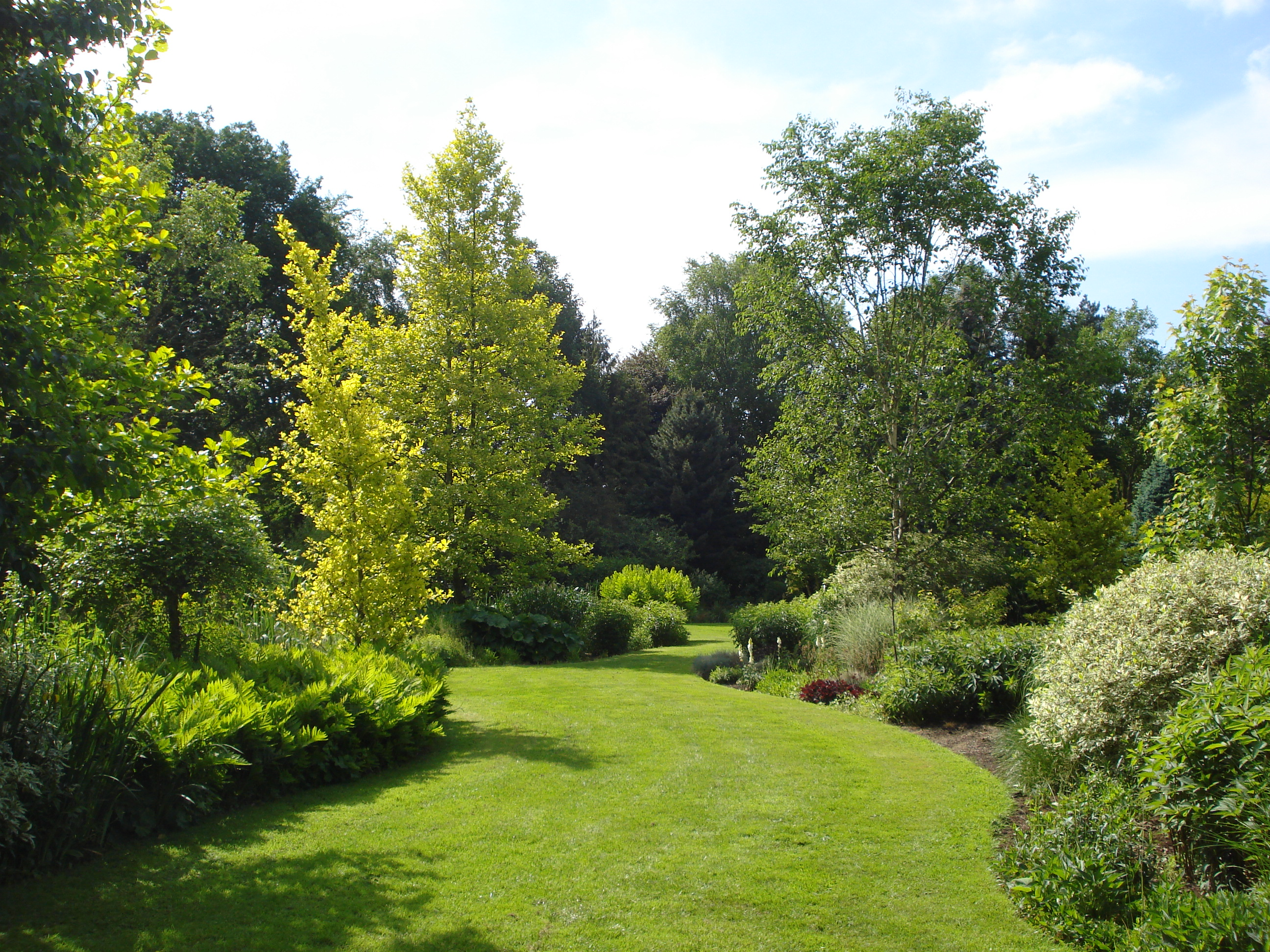
A view of a part of the gardens at Bressingham

The gardens were established by Alan Bloom MBE at Bressingham Hall. He moved to Bressingham in 1946, after selling his previous 36-acre (15 ha) site at Oakington in Cambridgeshire to raise the capital for the 220 acres (89 ha) in Norfolk, where he hoped to be both a farmer and a nurseryman. He was a plant expert of international renown, particularly in the field of hardy perennials. He laid out the Dell Garden at Bressingham, with its well-known island beds. His son, Adrian Bloom, laid out five additional gardens for year-round interest, starting with Foggy Bottom in 1963, and planted trees and shrubs from all over the world. He is still largely in charge of the Bressingham Gardens, which are not part of the charity but are privately owned by the Bloom family business. The Dell Garden is curated by Alan Bloom's son-in-law, Jaime Blake.

Much of the site is given over to commercial horticulture. The nurseries are not open to the public, but there is a garden centre on the site, which is independent from the Steam Museum and the Bloom Nurseries and Gardens. Bressingham Steam Museum is an independent charitable trust. Alan Bloom had wanted to create his own trust in 1967, to ensure that the collection would not be dispersed to pay for death duties, but the laws of the time made this difficult and after five years of negotiation, the museum was close to being handed over to the Transport Trust. However, the legislation governing private museums was relaxed just before the proposed handover in 1971. Consequently, Bloom was able to create his own trust and thus retain control of it, because the collection was of historical and educational importance.

== The Gallopers ==
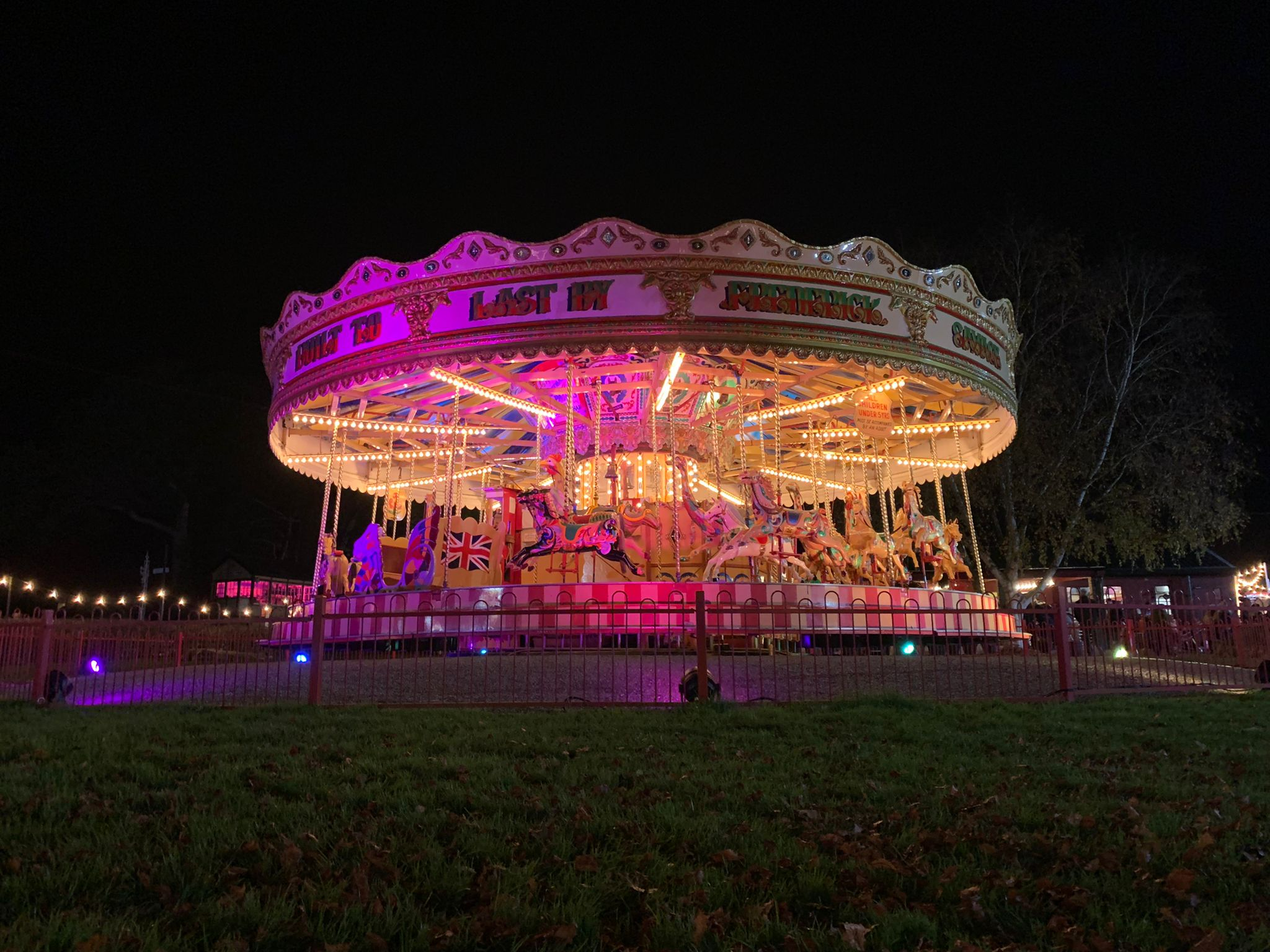
The Gallopers during the "Bressingham at Night" event.

The three-abreast Gallopers, purchased by Alan Bloom in 1967, are the centrepiece of the site. They were built by Frederick Savage in Kings Lynn in 1897 and were owned and operated by the Thurston family of Norfolk until 1934. The Gallopers later operated at Whitley Bay and later in Scotland before finding a home at Bressingham. They are currently powered by electricity, but were previously steam-powered. The engine used, "Victoria", was originally built by Tidmans of Norwich. The organ – a Bruder-built, 48 keyless Chiappa – which was built from two organs in 1954, accompanies the Gallopers.

== Miniature gauge railways ==
There exists a short loop of dual gauge, 5" and 7.25", track complete with turntable and locomotive shed. This along with a 7.25" Stafford steam locomotive, built by Station Road Steam, which was funded by the Young Steamers club at the Museum. The Young Steamers and this track has lain unused for a number of years. In 2023 the track was lifted and the kiddies fair ground, around which the railways ran, also departed and the area used for storage.

=== The Garden Railway ===
This 10 1/4 in (260 mm) gauge miniature railway runs through the Dell Garden, giving passengers clear views of the flower beds. The journey begins in a terminus station within the museum grounds before heading into the Dell Garden. At the far end of the garden, the train is turned in a balloon loop, before returning to the station. A turntable is located at the end of the platform road to facilitate the turning of the locomotive with minimal movements required. The points located at the balloon loop and the entrance to the platform road are spring operated so there is no requirement for a signalman. The coloured light aspect signal protecting the platform is interlocked with the lie of the points being set for the platform road and the turntable also being set to the platform road.

==== Locomotives ====
Number and name	Builder	Type	Livery	Notes	Image
1 Alan Bloom	Bressingham Steam Museum	0-4-0ST	Blue	Constructed along with the Garden Railway in 1995. The design of Alan Bloom was inspired by the design of Large Quarry Hunslet George Sholto, which operates on Bressingham's Fen Railway.	
2	Bressingham Steam Museum	4wDH	Red		

== Narrow gauge railways ==
There are two railway lines which take visitors around the gardens:

=== The Fen Railway ===
The Fen Railway (formerly the Nursery Railway) is a 1 ft 11 1/2 in (597 mm) narrow gauge railway. It was the second railway to be completed at Bressingham, first opening in 1966. The railway is 2.5 miles (4.0 km) long and crosses the Waveney Valley Railway, running parallel to it for a short distance. It also runs through meadows and passes the now-defunct plant nurseries. The Railway was extended twice following initial completion to become the length it is today.

Locomotives:

Number and name	Builder	Type	Livery	Notes	Image
316 Gwynedd	Hunslet	0-4-0ST Penrhyn Quarry Hunslet	Lined Penrhyn Quarry Black (Late Penrhyn Livery)	Built in 1883. The locomotive spent all of its working life at Penrhyn Quarry - initially working at Port Penrhyn before moving to the quarry. It arrived at Bressingham in 1966 and becoming a regular performer on the Fen Railway. Gwynedd received a new, all-welded boiler in 1984 to replace her life expired riveted boiler. A major overhaul was completed in 2000, where Gwynedd was repainted into Early Penrhyn Livery - the first authentic livery this locomotive has carried in preservation. She operated until 2007 when she was withdrawn from service for overhaul; the work included a new firebox and the locomotive was returned to service in 2017. In 2019, Gwynedd was the primary locomotive in use on the Fen Railway. In June 2018, Gwynedd attended the Penrhyn Theme gala at Bala Lake Railway in North Wales, where she ran alongside Hunslet 364 Winifred of 1885. This was the first time 2 Penrhyn Port Class Hunslets had steamed together in preservation. The following weekend, Gwynedd attended the Ffestiniog Railway's Hunslet 125 event. In addition to operating the Fen Railway at Bressingham, Gwynedd spent much of her time in the 1970s operating on Bressingham's short-lived Woodland Railway which has since been replaced by the 15-inch gauge Waveney Valley Railway.	
994 George Sholto	Hunslet	0-4-0ST Large Quarry Hunslet	Lined Green	Built in 1909. Similar to Gwynedd, George Sholto also operated at Penrhyn Quarry. The locomotive was restored at Bressingham and entered service in 1966. This locomotive has been a long serving and reliable performer on the Fen Railway. During the late 1990s, she was renamed Bill Harvey in honour of the former Norwich Shed Master. The locomotive was withdrawn from service in 2003 in need of a major overhaul. The overhaul involved the construction of a new boiler [The 3rd one this locomotive has carried during preservation] and work on the chassis in addition to a replacement saddle tank being constructed. The locomotive was outshopped in 2011 with her original name of George Sholto reinstated. Following overhaul the locomotive was outshopped with a cab - a feature that this locomotive had never possessed in its working life. Ordinarily, this locomotive is the primary locomotive on the regular passenger trains that operate, with occasional use on the slate train using wagons similar to those she hauled at Penrhyn - usually reserved for special events and driver experience courses. As of November 2018, this locomotive has been withdrawn for major overhaul.	
2 Bevan	Bressingham	0-4-0T	Lined Green	Bevan arrived at Bressingham as a kit of parts in 2007 as an abandoned project previously being carried out by the Cambridge Welding Institute. When Bressingham acquired her, she was a boiler, with frames and cylinders and nothing else. Bressingham assembled and constructed the rest of the locomotive. This entailed designing the motion from scratch, building water tanks, the cab and tender to name a few. She was test steamed in 2009 with final completion in 2010. Usually reserved for running weekday trains outside of the School Holidays when less carriages are required. She has however become the primary locomotive once she returned to service in summer 2019 following an overhaul; largely owing to George Sholto being withdrawn for a major overhaul.	
2088 Armistice	Bagnall	0-4-0ST		Moved from the Bredgar & Wormshill Light Railway in 2025.	
22120	Motor Rail Simplex	4wdDM	Brown	Built in 1964 and spend its working life at Anglia Water. During the early 1990s, this was disguised to resemble Toby the Tram Engine. It has since lost the wooden body and returned to service on the railway.	
8911	Hunslet	4wDH Hunslet	Unlined Blue.	Built in 1980. The locomotive is operational and is primarily used to pull passengers on the Fen Railway at quieter times of the year.	
9155 Bovis	Hunslet	4wBE	Lined Black	Built in 1971. A rare example of a Hunslet Battery Electric locomotive. This is out of service and plinthed near one of the standard gauge sheds.	

=== The Waveney Valley Railway ===
15 in (381 mm) gauge miniature railway. The line was first opened in 1973 and is 1.5 miles (2.4 km) in length. It crosses the 1 ft 11 1/2 in (597 mm) Fen Railway and also runs parallel to the 4 ft 8 1/2 in (1,435 mm) standard gauge line for a time.

Locomotives:

Number and name	Builder	Type	Livery	Notes	Image
1662 Rosenkavalier	Krupp	4-6-2 Pacific	Lined light Green	Built in 1937. Along with Männertreu she was built for use at a trade fair in Düsseldorf. Arrived at Bressingham in 1973 and has been a mainstay of the Waveney Valley Railway. Withdrawn from service in 2011 in need of a major overhaul and is currently on display in the Exhibition Hall.	
1663 Männertreu	Krupp	4-6-2 Pacific	Lined dark Green	Built in 1937. Along with Rosenkavalier she was built for use at a trade fair in Düsseldorf. Arrived at Bressingham in 1973 and has been a mainstay of the Waveney Valley Railway. Withdrawn from service in 2008 and is undergoing a major overhaul. Locomotive's frames are currently on public display – it is anticipated that much of the work will be carried out in the locomotive display sheds so visitors can monitor progress.	
St Christopher	Exmoor Steam Railway	2-6-2T	Lined Red	Constructed by the Exmoor Steam Railway in 2001 and was based on the Windmill Farm Railway. The locomotive moved to Bressingham in 2011 and is operational. It is the main locomotive used on the Waveney Valley Railway. Repainted to a lined red livery in favour over the original lined blue livery during the 2017/2018 mechanical overhaul.	
D6353 Beaver	J. Brown	4wd-4wdDM	Green with full Yellow ends.	Built in 1998. Based on a British Rail Class 22 locomotive. Operational and occasionally used on passenger trains.	
Ivor	Frezne Engineering	4wDH	Green	Built in 1979. Operational and used as a works locomotive.	

== Standard gauge railway ==
=== Standard gauge locomotives ===
Number and name	Builder	Type	Wheel arrangement	Year	Livery	Status	Notes	Image
662 Martello	Brighton railway works	LB&SCR A1 Class	0-6-0T	1875	SR Lined Green	Boiler certificate expired 2026		No. 662 "Martello"
102 Granville	Nine Elms Locomotive Works	LSWR B4 class	0-4-0T	1893	Dark green	On static display		No. 102 "Granville"
490	Stratford Works	GER Class T26	2-4-0	1894	GER Ultramarine Blue	On static display	On loan from the National Railway Museum	No. 490
87	Stratford Works	GER Class S56	0-6-0T	1904	GER Ultramarine Blue	On static display	On loan from the National Railway Museum	No. 87
80	Robert Stephenson and Company	LT&SR 79 Class	4-4-2T	1909	LT&SR green	On static display	On loan from the National Railway Museum	No. 80
6841 William Francis	Beyer, Peacock and Company		0-4-0+0-4-0	1937	Brown, lined	On static display	Worked at Baddesley Colliery. This is the last surviving standard gauge Garratt in Britain.	No. 6841 "William Francis"
25	Neilson and Company		0-4-0ST	1896	Green	On static display	worked at Beckton Gas Works	No. 25
1472 Bluebottle	Andrew Barclay		0-4-0F	1916		On static display		No. 1472 "Bluebottle"
5865 Peer Gynt	Schichau-Werke	DB/NSB Class 52/63	2-10-0	1944	Black	On static display	Stored in a disused tunnel in Norway from 1958 to 1972 and restored, now on static display.	No. 5865 "Peer Gynt"
377 King Haakon VII	NOHAB	NSB Class 21c	2-6-0	1919	Green	On static display		No. 377 "King Haakon"
92203 Black Prince	Swindon Works	BR Standard Class 9F	2-10-0	1959	Black	Stored awaiting overhaul	On loan from the North Norfolk Railway	No. 92203 "Black Prince"
11103 Mavis		BR Class 04						

== Broad gauge steam locomotives ==
Number and name	Builder	Type	Wheel arrangement	Year	Livery	Status	Notes	Image
1144	Lokomo	VR Class Tk3	2-8-0	1948	VR Dark Green	On static display. Plinthed.		No. 1144

== Steam vehicles ==
A variety of steam vehicles are in the collection.

=== Steam Engines Portable and others ===
- Burrell No. 2363 of 1901 Portable. Operational.
- Youngs Portable of 1910. Manufactured locally in Diss. On display.
- Tidman Centre Engine (fairground) No. 1891 Victoria. Usually resides in the centre section of Gallopers. Withdrawn 2015 pending replacement of Boiler Barrel - Expected to re-enter service late 2019
- Merryweather Fire Engine no. 3702.
- Merryweather Fire Pump of 1914.

=== Steam Rollers ===
- Burrell No. 3962 Boxer of 1923 reg no. PW 1714. On display.
- Burrell No. 3993 Buster of 1924 reg no. CF 5646. Operational.
- Robey 4 ton Tandem Steam Roller No. 42520 Barkis built in 1925 reg No. FE 7632. On display.

=== Steam Tractors / Traction ===
- Garrett 5 ton Steam Tractor No. 34641 Bunty, built in 1924 reg no. CF 5913. On display.
- Burrell Traction engine No. 3112 Bertha of 1909 reg no. CF 3440. On display.
- Foster Traction engine No. 2821 Beryl of 1903 reg. no. BE 7448. Operational.
- Fowler Traction engine No. 6188 Beulah of 1890 reg no. MA 8528. On display.

== Gallery ==
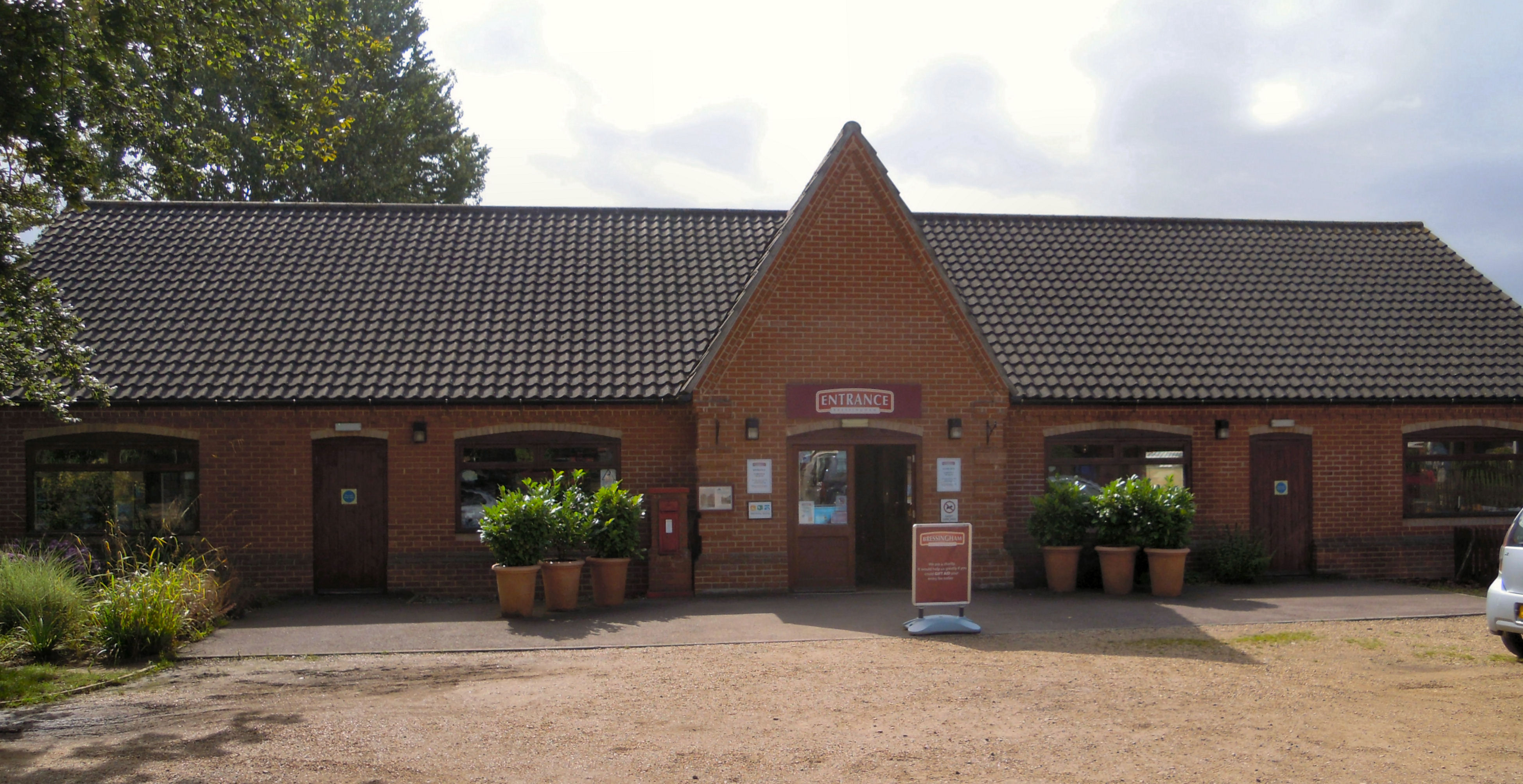
The entrance

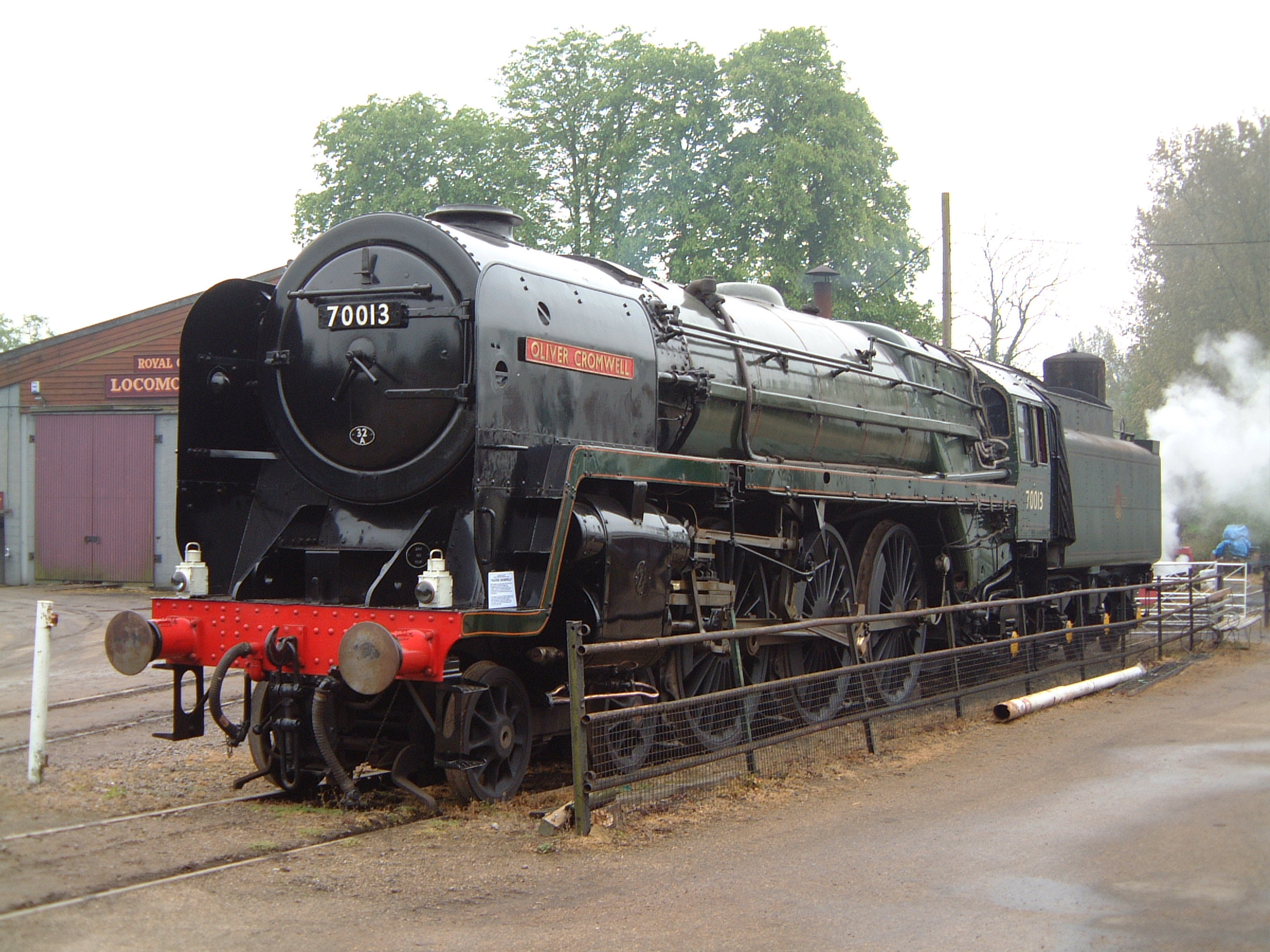
70013, Oliver Cromwell at Bressingham in May 2004

== Dad's Army Collection ==
The museum is the home of the national Dad's Army collection of vintage vehicles. These are located on a reconstruction of the High Street in the fictional Walmington-on-Sea, beside the butcher's shop of Lance Corporal Jones, Private Frazer's undertaker's shop, and Captain Mainwaring's bank office.

The vehicles include Jones's van and the dust cart from the 1971 Dad's Army film, Mainwaring's Austin 8 staff car used in the episode "The Making of Private Pike", the vintage fire engine used in "Brain Versus Brawn" and the steamroller "Boxer" and traction engine "Bertha", which appeared in other episodes.

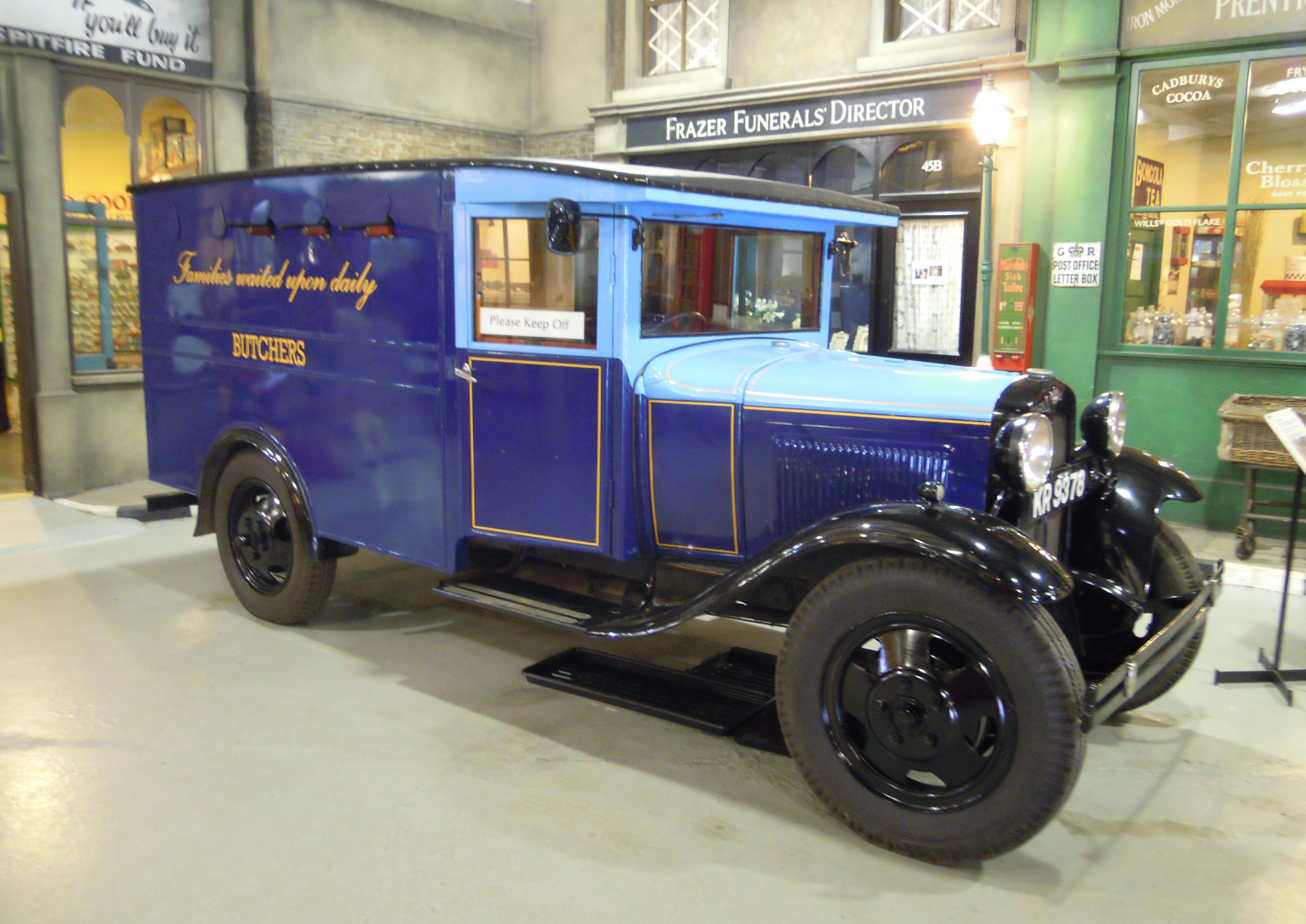
Jones' van from the 1971 Dad's Army film.

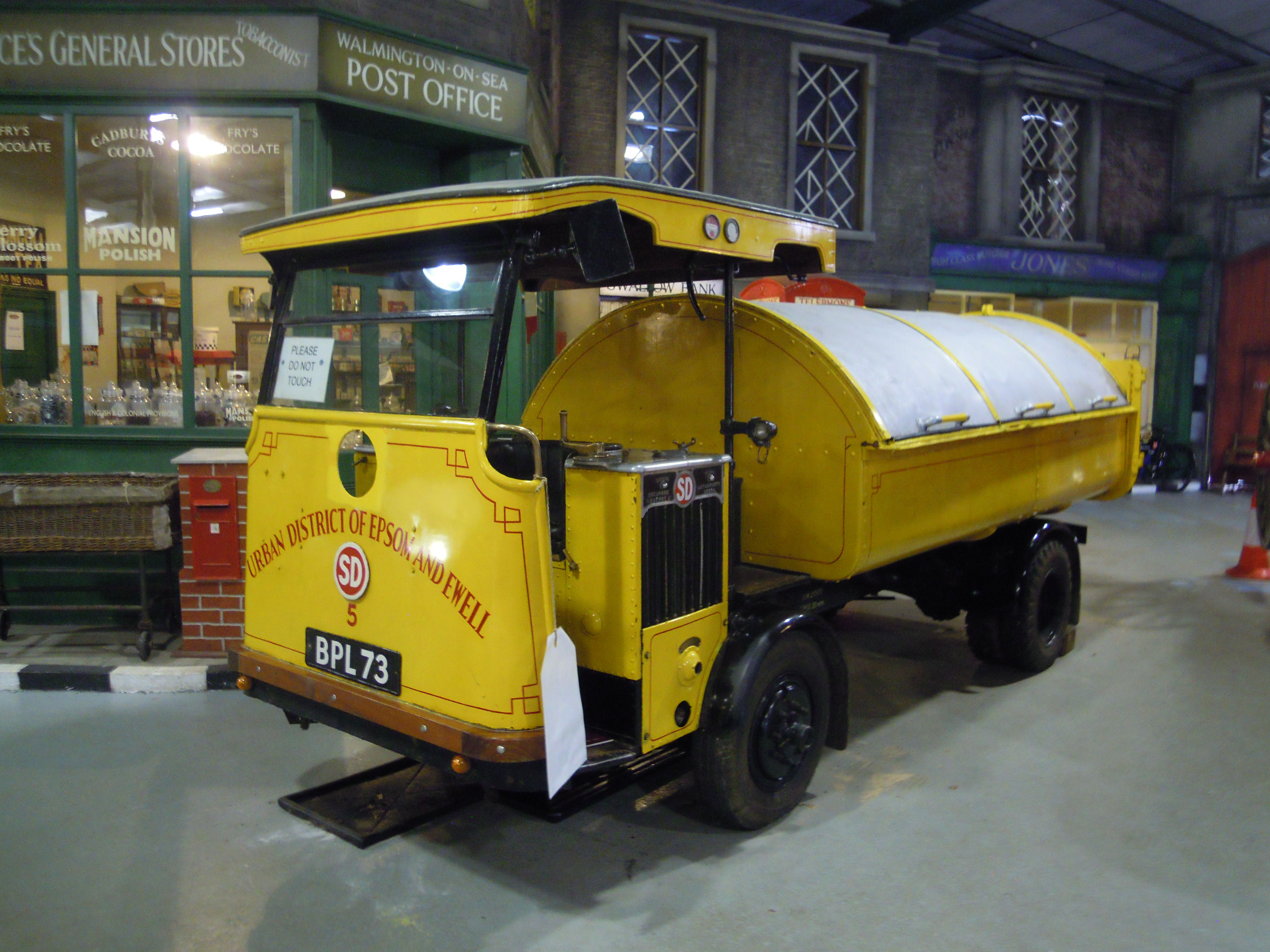
Dust cart from the 1971 Dad's Army film.

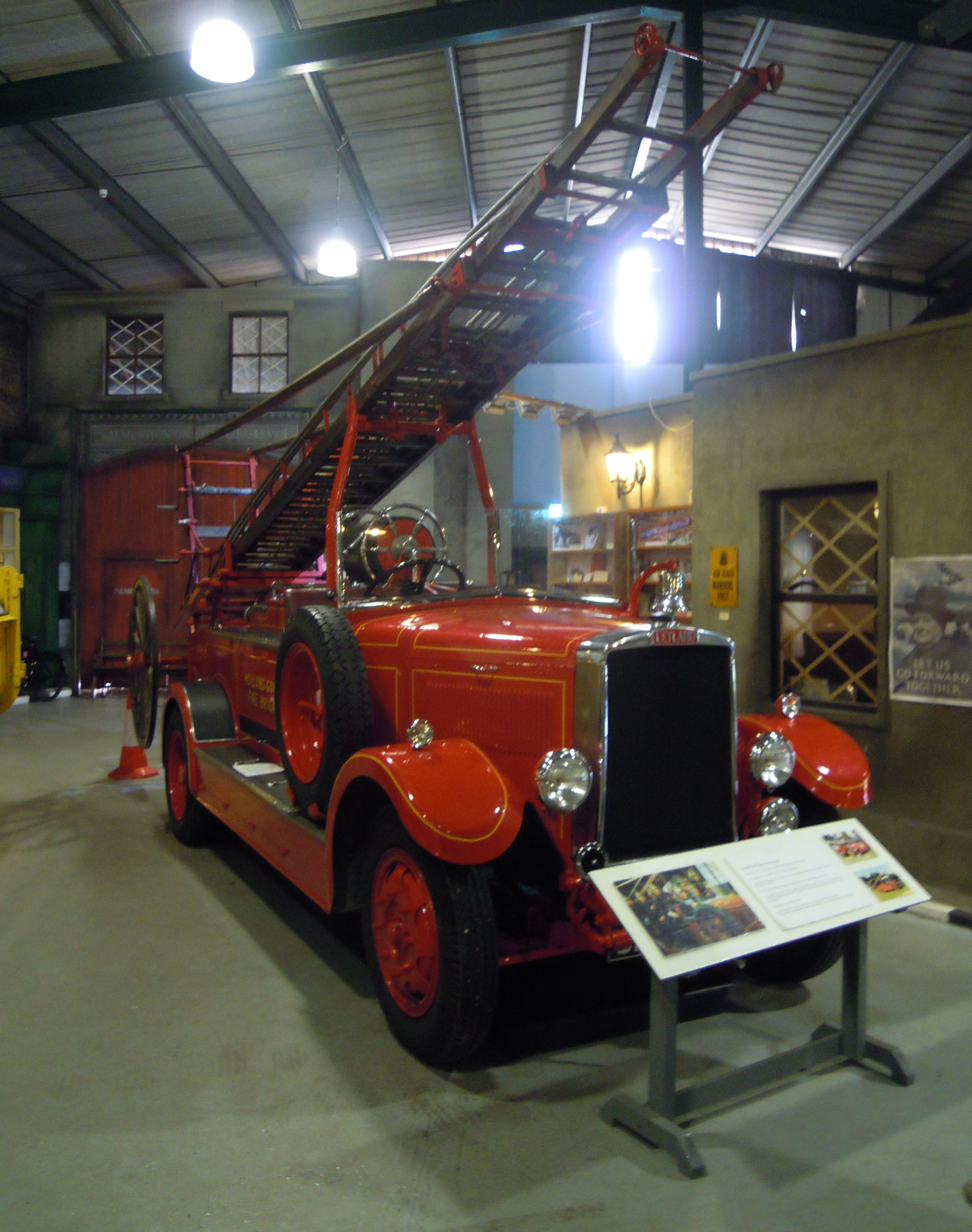
Fire engine used in "Brain Versus Brawn".

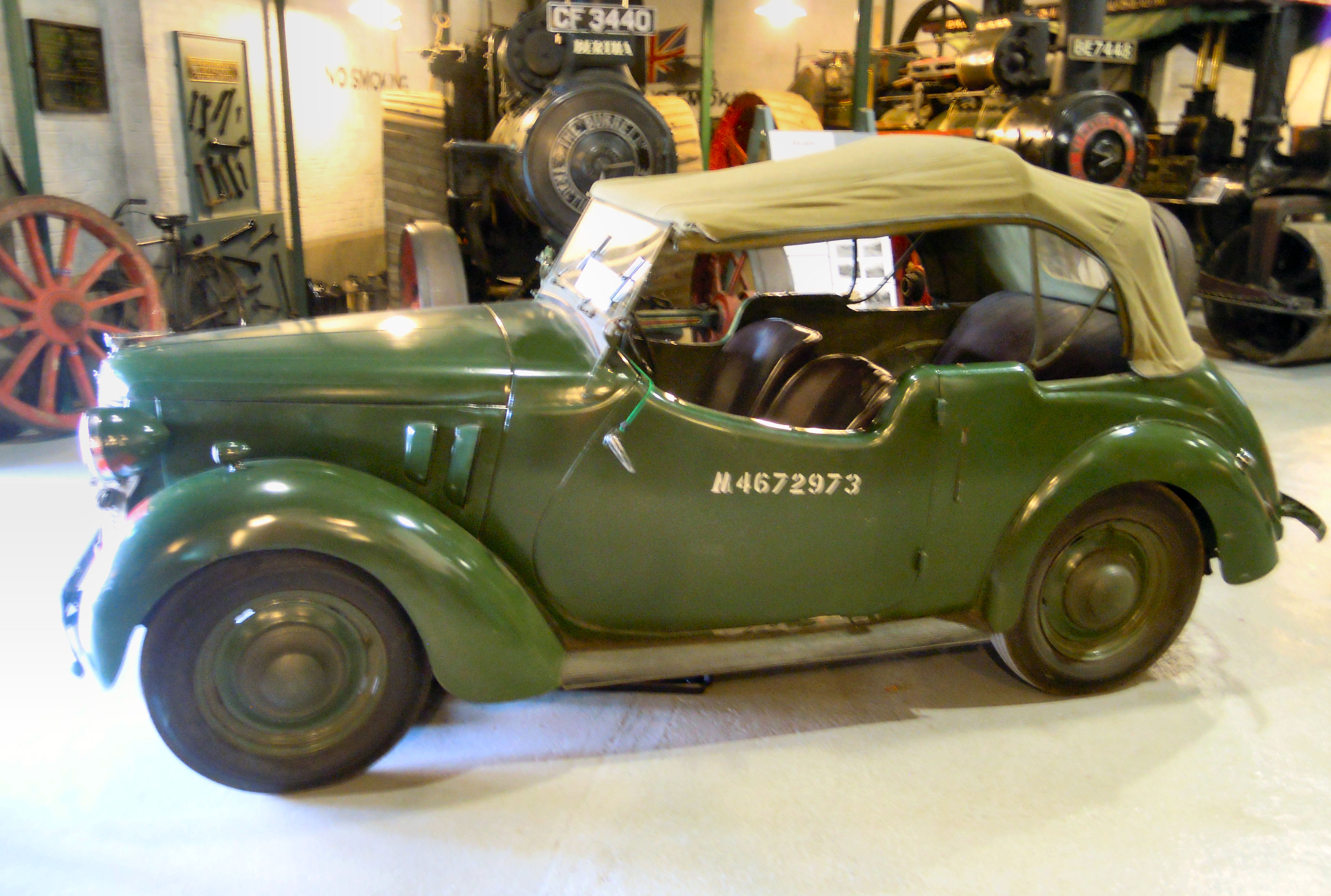
Captain Mainwaring's Austin 8 staff car from "The Making of Private Pike".

== See also ==
- Index of steam energy articles
