= Fallen Idol (Dad's Army) =

- Dad's Army episode
- Episode no.: Series 4 Episode 13
- Directed by: David Croft
- Story by: Jimmy Perry and David Croft
- Original air date: 18 December 1970
- Running time: 34 minutes

Episode chronology
← Previous "Uninvited Guests"	Next → "Battle of the Giants!"

"Fallen Idol" is the thirteenth and final episode of the fourth series of the British comedy series Dad's Army. It was originally transmitted on Friday 18 December 1970.

== Synopsis ==
Captain Mainwaring has always epitomized the principle of military sobriety to his men, but, after Captain Square leads him astray one day in the Officer's Mess, he ends up inebriated. Only something genuinely heroic now can restore his damaged reputation in the eyes of his men.

== Plot ==
The Walmington-on-Sea platoon arrive at a weekend country training camp to learn about handling bombs. The camp is run by the twitchy Captain Reed, who is frightened by the enthusiasm and lack of awareness shown by the Home Guard units. He is particularly unsettled by the Walmington platoon, especially Corporal Jones.

As the men bring their bedding into their bivouac tent, Private Pike tries to find his teddy bear, Mr. Snuggly. When Sergeant Wilson finds it, Mainwaring notices and Wilson reluctantly claims that the bear is his, so as not to embarrass Pike. Meanwhile, Jones has brought a mosquito net, despite Walker telling him there are not any around. Jones explains that he has had the net since his Sudan days, and that it helped to keep out snakes as well during cold nights.

Captain Square enters and convinces Mainwaring to set up an officers only section in the tent for himself and Wilson, much to the outrage of the men. He subsequently offends them by attending a select officers mess, drinking whisky with Square and his two colleagues, and playing "Cardinal Puff" (Note: Cardinal Puff is a real-life army drinking game dating back to the 17th century. The prospective "Cardinal" must go through a series of rituals: tapping finger once above table, once under table, stamping left foot, stamping right foot, standing up, and banging the glass on the table before toasting Cardinal Puff. The rituals are repeated twice for the second drink to Cardinal Puff-Puff and three times for the final toast to the health of Cardinal Puff-Puff-Puff. If the drinker gets one of the steps wrong, he has to finish his glass and start from the beginning.) while his men enjoy a couple of bottles of ale elsewhere. Most of the men are disgruntled, while noting this is not Mainwaring's normal behaviour. Frazer goes so far as to threaten to resign (his general surly attitude of late has led Mainwaring to suspect he is a communist, noting he "never plays Monopoly with the others" as evidence of his suspicions). After the men go to bed, a drunken Mainwaring returns to their tent only to be jumped on by Jones, thinking he is a thuggee.

The next morning, a rather hungover and worse for wear Captain Mainwaring joins his men for training. While at first things go seemingly to plan, potential disaster soon strikes when a stray rifle grenade is fired into the roof of Jones's van. He starts to drive away, so Mainwaring gives chase on a bicycle, gets into the van and warns Jones, who abandons the van while it is moving. A cool Mainwaring then stops and evacuates the van, but it is stood next to power lines. Mainwaring immediately re-enters the van and recovers the grenade: his command of the situation restoring his reputation in the eyes of the platoon. After Mainwaring throws the grenade away and dives for safety he hears panting, looking up to see the grenade being held by a shaggy dog. Mainwaring flees, only to be chased down the road by the dog as the episode ends. (Note: The dog at the end of this episode is a Bearded Collie.)

== Cast ==
- Arthur Lowe as Captain Mainwaring
- John Le Mesurier as Sergeant Wilson
- Clive Dunn as Lance Corporal Jones
- John Laurie as Private Frazer
- James Beck as Private Walker
- Arnold Ridley as Private Godfrey
- Ian Lavender as Private Pike
- Geoffrey Lumsden as Captain Square
- Rex Garner as Captain Ashley-Jones
- Michael Knowles as Captain Reed
- Anthony Sagar as Sergeant Major
- Tom Mennard as Mess Orderly
- Robert Raglan as Captain Pritchard

== Notes ==
- The runtime of this episode is over 34 minutes.
- This is Robert Raglan’s third appearance in series three. Somewhat unusually each time he appears in series three he has a different rank: HG Sergeant in “Don’t Forget The Diver”, Colonel Pritchard in “A.Wilson (Manager)?”, and Captain Pritchard in “Fallen Idol”. He would appear in the following episode, the 1972 Christmas episode “Battle of the Giants”, this time with his rank restored to ‘Colonel’ - he remains with this rank for the rest of his time on the series.
