= Charles Burrell Museum =

Museum in Thetford, Norfolk, England

Coordinates: 52.4149°N 0.7453°E

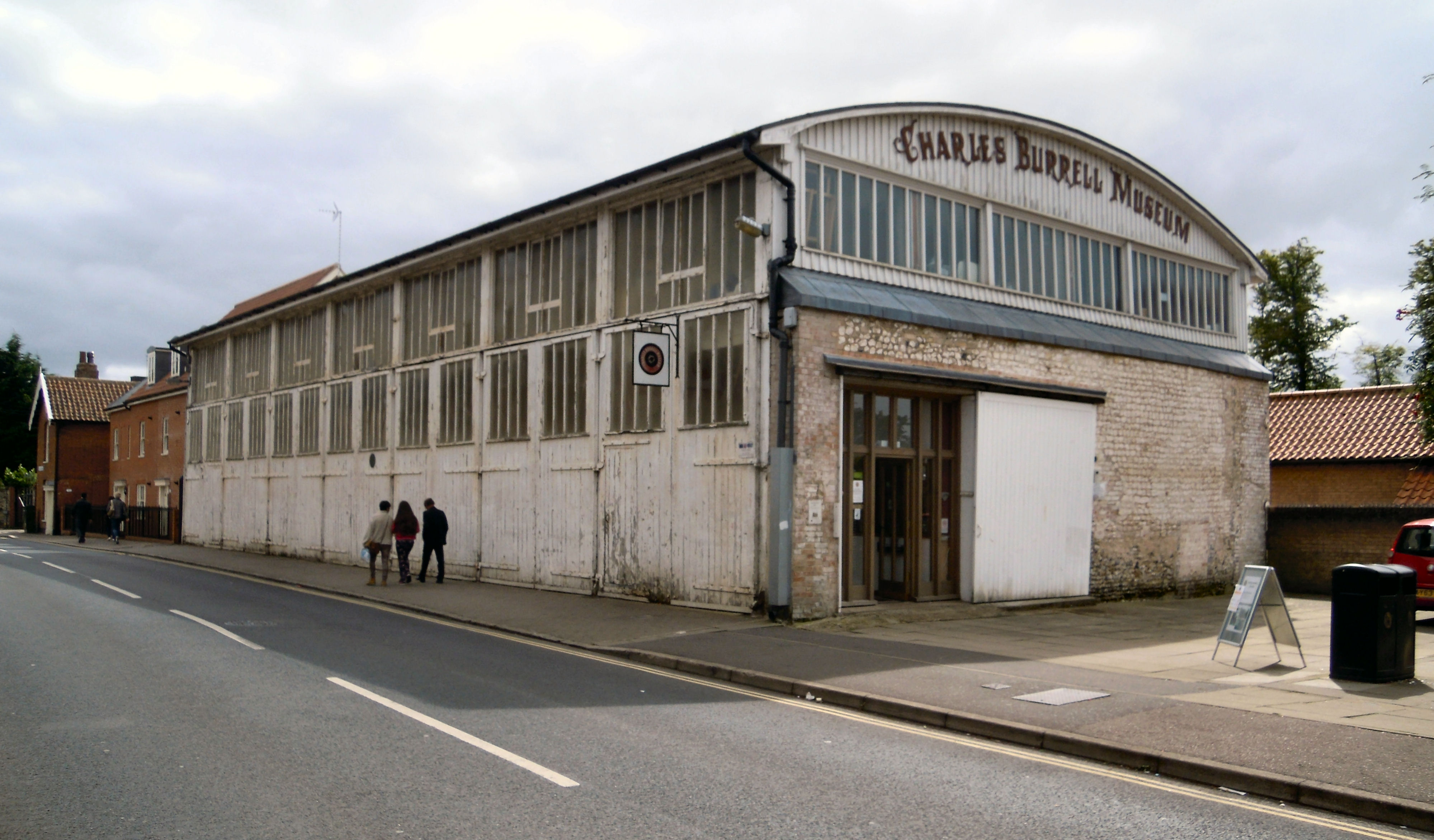
The Charles Burrell Museum in Thetford

The Charles Burrell Museum is a museum in Thetford in Norfolk, England, dedicated to steam power and steam transport.

The museum opened in 1991 in the former Paint Shop of Charles Burrell & Sons, which is grade II listed, on Minstergate in Thetford. The collections tell the stories of the Charles Burrell Works, a company which at one time employed 350 people who worked there until the business closed in 1928, and the steam-powered engines they produced and which sold around the world. Displays include a Charles Burrell and Sons Ltd steam roller, traction engine and a Showmans Road Locomotive, parts of Burrell engines, factory machinery, agricultural equipment and items linked to the Burrell Family.

The original plans to many of the Burrell engines are held privately by the Palmer family of Haughley in Suffolk through the marriage of Mrs Annie Palmer to Mr Thomas Doran JP, Mayor of Thetford, whom with his brother founded Doran Bros of Thetford at Haughley House in Croxton Road, Thetford.

The museum is open on Saturdays with free admission and is run by volunteers.

== Jones's van from Dad's Army ==
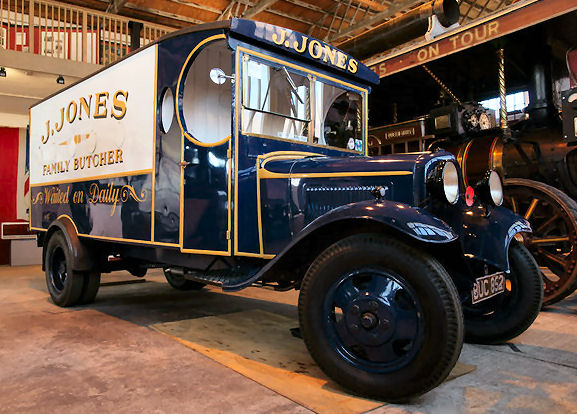
Jones's van was purchased by the Dad's Army Museum in 2012

In 2012, the nearby Dad's Army Museum bought the original Ford BB van used as Jones's butcher's van in Dad's Army. The van went on display at the Charles Burrell Museum in early 2013 owing to lack of space at the former museum.

== Gallery ==
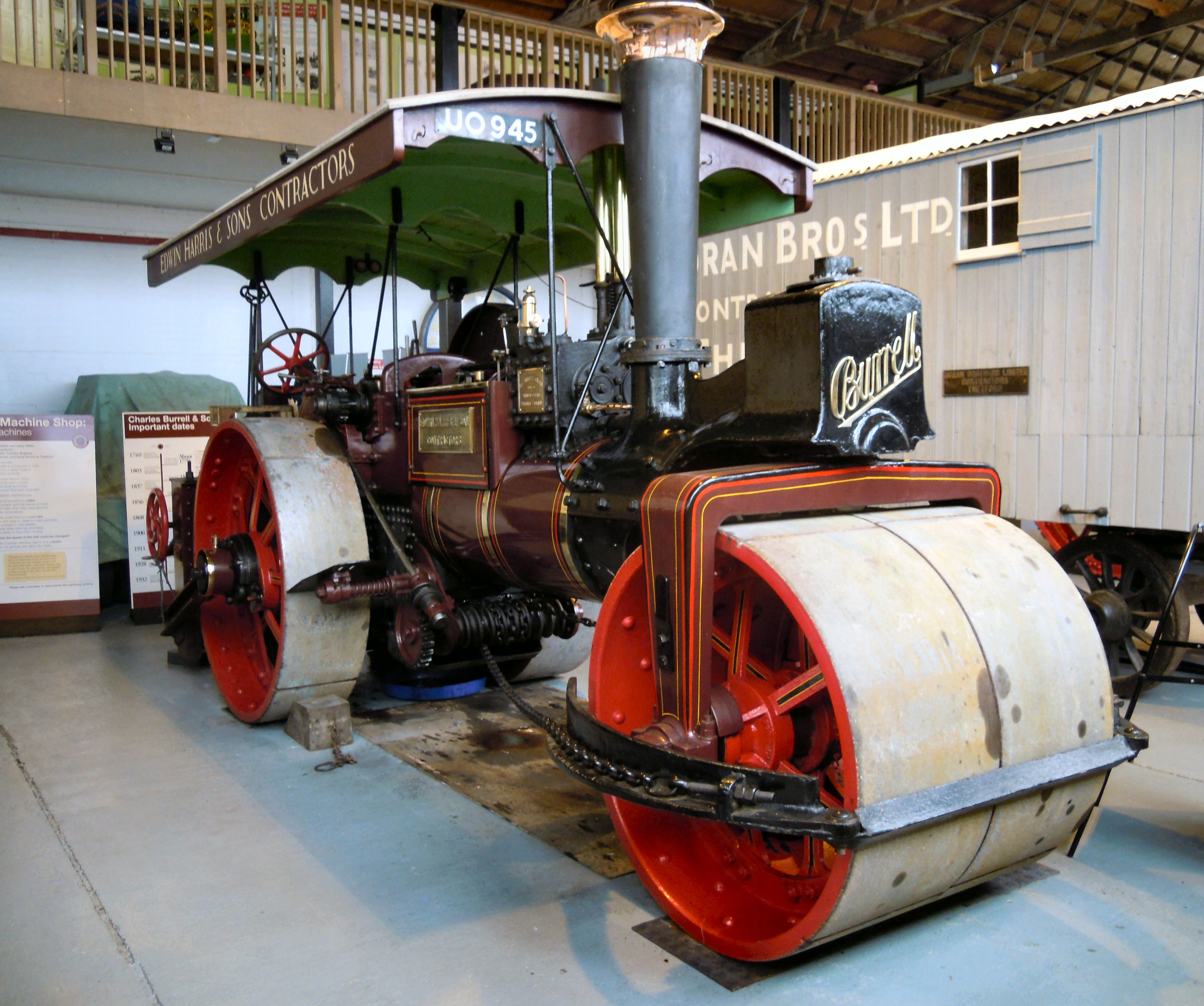
An engine displayed at the museum

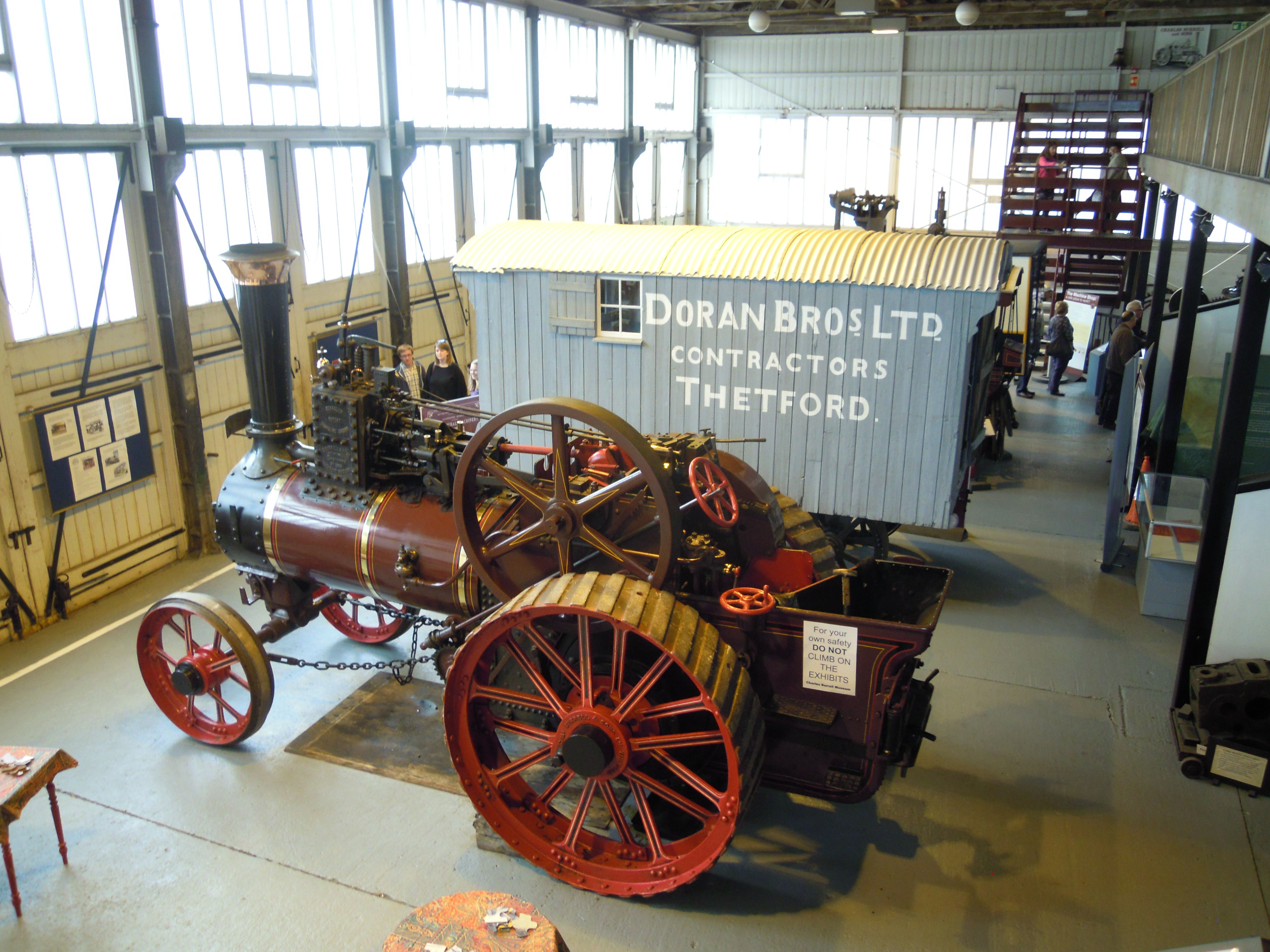
An engine displayed at the museum

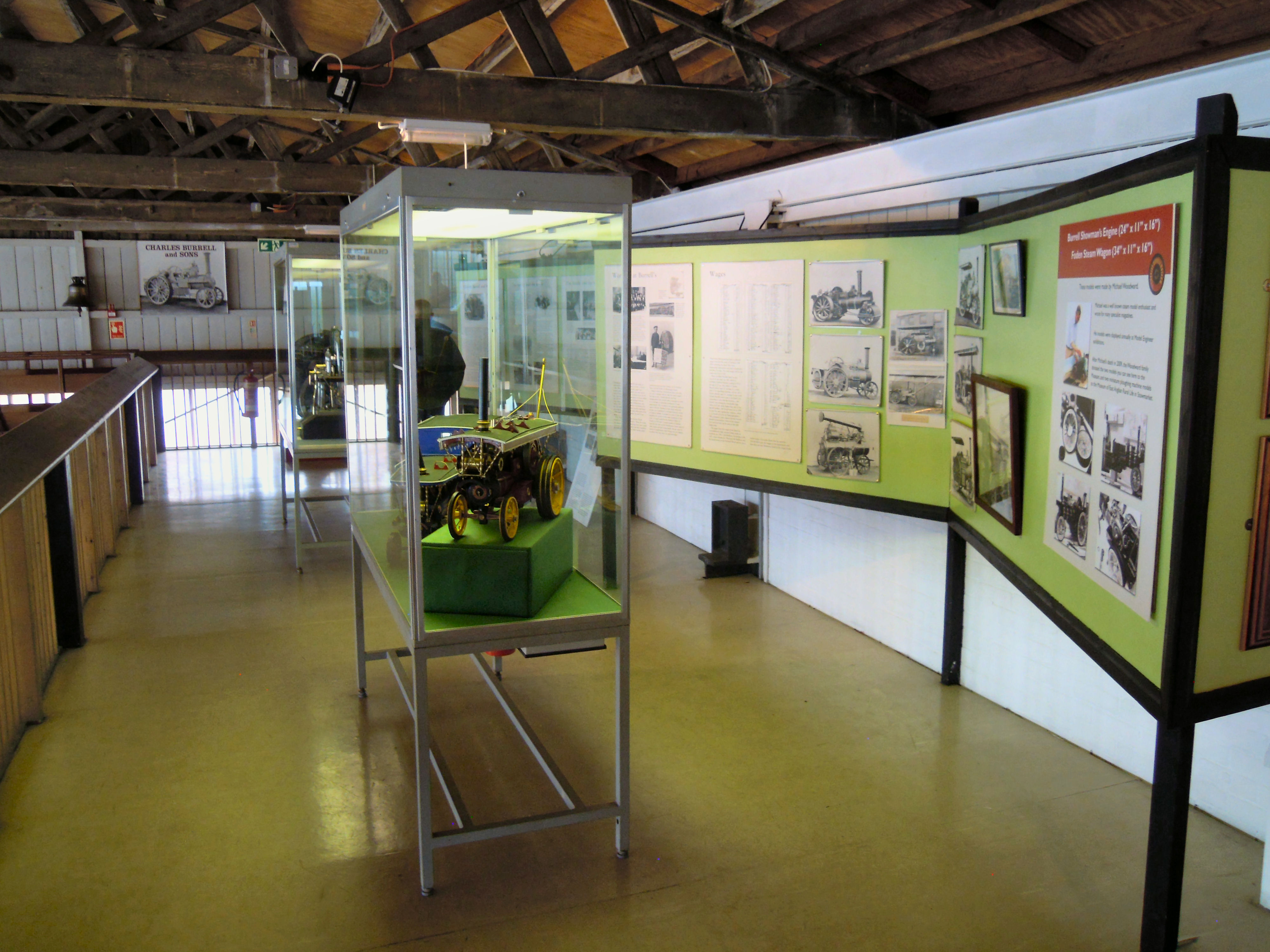
A gallery at the museum

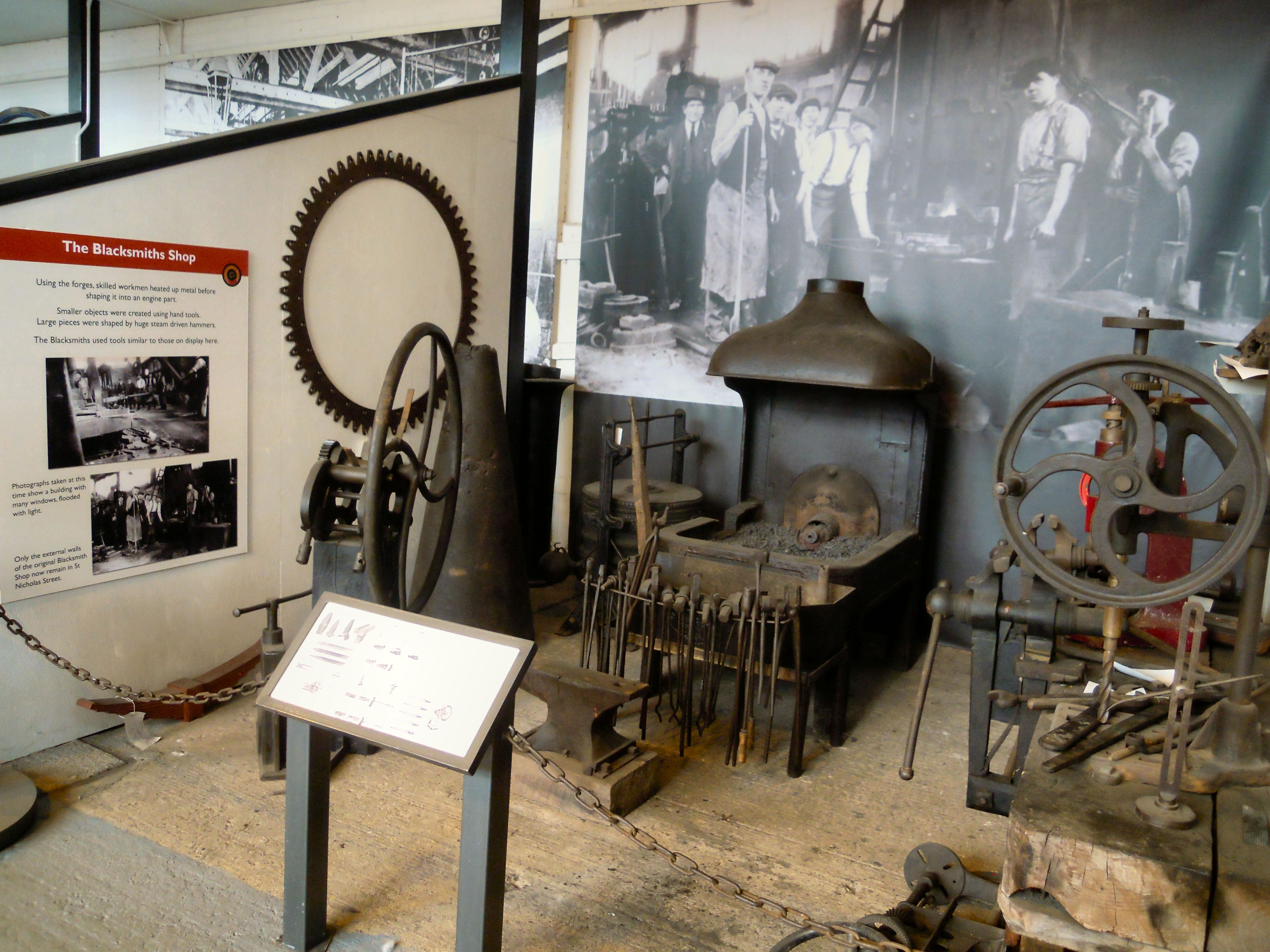
A display at the museum
