= Dad's Army (2016 film) =

2016 British comedy film by Oliver Parker

- Theatrical release poster
- Directed by: Oliver Parker
- Written by: Hamish McColl
- Based on: Dad's Army by David Croft and Jimmy Perry
- Produced by: Damian Jones
- Starring: Bill Nighy; Catherine Zeta-Jones; Toby Jones; Tom Courtenay; Michael Gambon; Blake Harrison; Daniel Mays; Bill Paterson
- Cinematography: Christopher Ross
- Edited by: Guy Bensley
- Music by: Charlie Mole
- Production company: DJ Films
- Distributed by: Universal Pictures International
- Release date: 5 February 2016 (United Kingdom)
- Running time: 100 minutes
- Country: United Kingdom
- Language: English
- Box office: $12.8 million

Dad's Army is a 2016 British war comedy film, based on the BBC television sitcom Dad's Army. It is directed by Oliver Parker and set in 1944, after the events depicted in the television series. Catherine Zeta-Jones plays an elegant German spy, posing as a journalist, reporting on the Walmington-on-Sea Home Guard platoon.

The platoon members are played by Toby Jones (Captain Mainwaring, based on Arthur Lowe), Bill Nighy (Sergeant Wilson, based on John Le Mesurier), Tom Courtenay (Lance Corporal Jones, based on Clive Dunn), Bill Paterson (Private Frazer, based on John Laurie), Michael Gambon (Private Godfrey, based on Arnold Ridley), Blake Harrison (Private Pike, based on Ian Lavender) and Daniel Mays (Private Walker, based on James Beck).

The production design was by Simon Bowles and the cinematography by Christopher Ross. The film was released on 5 February 2016 in the United Kingdom by Universal Pictures. DVD and Blu-ray released in the United Kingdom on 13 June 2016. It received mostly negative reviews from critics. When the film was released in the United Kingdom, it reached second place in the box-office charts, behind Goosebumps.

== Plot ==
In the spring of 1944, German forces work to secure intelligence about the upcoming Allied invasion, after one of their spies is intercepted in London by MI5 agents, Major Cunningham and Captain Meeks. Meanwhile, Captain Mainwaring finds his Home Guard in the coastal town of Walmington-on-Sea suffer from a lack of appreciation for their work in contributing to the war effort. Things change when the platoon, during an exercise, accidentally force Rose Winters, an elegant journalist, off the road. When they learn she intends to write a report about them for a national magazine, the men feel delighted, but also are charmed by her presence, causing them to have feuds with the townsfolk, and especially with their wives. The matter is further complicated when Sergeant Wilson develops a friendship with Winters after recognising her as a student he once tutored at the University of Oxford.

Unknown to the platoon, Rose is actually the spy sent by Germany to investigate the Allied invasion plans, but a transmission she sends by radio is detected by Cunningham and Meeks, who travel there to seek her out. After meeting with Mainwaring and informing him of the situation, he takes delight in using this as a means to save his platoon from being disbanded by the Home Guard's senior officer, Colonel Theakes, after a disaster during an important patrol near Dover. Rose swiftly joins the patrol through Private Joe Walker, after discovering his illegal bootlegging business, and uses the next patrol to discover important details on the Allies' plan, including where the invasion will take place. As the platoon work to find the spy on Mainwaring's orders, Rose deceives him in believing the spy is Wilson, who is promptly arrested.

While Mainwaring decides to meet with Rose to thank her for her assistance, the rest of the platoon detain Wilson for questioning, until evidence is brought to their attention that Rose is the spy they were seeking. Tracking her down, they quickly find her holding Mainwaring prisoner with a Wehrmacht landing party, after he discovered the truth upon seeing a German U-boat appear in a nearby bay. However, the platoon help to rescue him with the aid of their wives, and manage to capture the landing party and Rose, causing the U-boat to flee. Cunningham and Meeks swiftly arrest her, ensuring her intelligence doesn't return, while Theakes commends the platoon, saving them from being disbanded. Mainwaring and Wilson reconcile, and both men join their platoon for a parade through Walmington-on-Sea.

== Cast ==
- Toby Jones as Captain Mainwaring
- Bill Nighy as Sergeant Wilson
- Catherine Zeta-Jones as Rose Winters
- Tom Courtenay as Lance Corporal Jones
- Blake Harrison as Private Pike
- Michael Gambon as Private Godfrey
- Bill Paterson as Private Frazer
- Daniel Mays as Private Walker
- Sarah Lancashire as Mrs Pike
- Mark Gatiss as Colonel Theakes
- Mark Tandy as Major Cunningham, MI5
- Andrew Havill as Captain Meeks, MI5
- Emily Atack as Daphne
- Alison Steadman as Mrs Fox
- Holli Dempsey as Vera Shilton
- Annette Crosbie as Cissy Godfrey
- Ian Lavender as Brigadier Pritchard
- Frank Williams as the Reverend Timothy Farthing (Credited only as 'The Vicar')
- Felicity Montagu as Mrs Mainwaring
- Martin Savage as Warden Hodges
- Oliver Tobias as Admiral Canaris
- Julia Foster as Dolly Godfrey
- Jacqueline Tong as Mrs Todd

Ian Lavender makes a cameo as Brigadier Pritchard, providing a link with the original series, and Frank Williams reprised his role as the vicar.

The regular series character of the verger Maurice Yeatman, originally played by Edward Sinclair was not recreated for the film. Semi-regular platoon member Private Sponge, originally played by Colin Bean, appeared as a nonspeaking role for (unknown). Mrs. Mainwaring, who was a completely unseen character for the whole of the original series, now has a prominently visible role in the film, where she is portrayed as a chief volunteer of the local Auxiliary Territorial Service, and is even more pompous, domineering and vociferous than her husband.

== Production ==
Filming began in Yorkshire in October 2014. Principal photography took place at North Landing, Flamborough Head and Bridlington. The East Riding Theatre in Beverley was used for church hall/parade room and Captain Mainwaring's office. Sections of the film were also captured in Leeds and Pickering. Jones's van from the original television series, on loan from the Dad's Army Museum in Thetford, was used in the film.

== Reception ==
Dad's Army has received generally negative reviews from critics. The film holds a 31% approval rating on Rotten Tomatoes, based on 35 reviews, with an average rating of 4.91/10. On Metacritic, it has a score of 38 out of 100, based on seven critics, which indicates "generally unfavorable" reviews.

Sean O'Grady, of The Independent, gave the film a five star review, remarking that rather than threatening the series' legacy, it "surpasses the original", calling it a "well crafted reproduction containing all the elements that made the original so clever, durable and loveable."

Peter Bradshaw of The Guardian was less convinced, giving it two stars, stating that "it's hard to escape the sinking feeling that this is a waste of talent – that this is a good natured, well meaning but pointless kind of Brit comedy ancestor worship; paying elaborate homage to a TV show that got it right the first time."

Empire rated it two stars describing the plot as "moderately entertaining bunkum" and that "as a whole it's an inessential oddity – amiable enough but also over reverential and unlikely to leave a lasting impression".
