= Dad's Army (1971 film) =

1971 British comedy film by Norman Cohen

- Theatrical release poster
- Directed by: Norman Cohen
- Screenplay by: Jimmy Perry; David Croft
- Story by: Jimmy Perry
- Based on: Dad's Army by Jimmy Perry and David Croft
- Produced by: John R. Sloan
- Starring: Arthur Lowe; John Le Mesurier; Clive Dunn; John Laurie; James Beck; Arnold Ridley; Ian Lavender; Liz Fraser
- Cinematography: Terry Maher
- Edited by: Willy Kemplen
- Music by: Wilfred Burns
- Production company: Norcon Film Productions
- Distributed by: Columbia Pictures
- Release date: 12 March 1971
- Running time: 95 minutes
- Country: United Kingdom
- Language: English

Dad's Army is a 1971 British war comedy film directed by Norman Cohen and starring Arthur Lowe, John Le Mesurier, Clive Dunn, John Laurie, Arnold Ridley, Ian Lavender and James Beck. It was written by Jimmy Perry and David Croft and was the first film adaptation of the BBC television sitcom Dad's Army (1968–1977). It was filmed between series three and four and was based upon material from the early episodes of the television series. The film tells the story of the Home Guard platoon's formation and their subsequent endeavours at a training exercise.

== Plot ==
1940, Walmington-on-Sea, England. George Mainwaring, the manager of the Walmington-on-Sea branch of Martins Bank, and his chief clerk, Arthur Wilson, listen to Anthony Eden's radio broadcast, informing them of the formation of the Local Defence Volunteers (LDV), later renamed the Home Guard. At the local police station, Mainwaring takes charge of the enrolment of the men and, after commandeering the local church hall, he registers the assembled volunteers.

The local platoon is formed with Mainwaring in command as captain, Wilson as his sergeant and local butcher Jack Jones as the lance corporal. The appointed privates include undertaker James Frazer, retired tailor Charles Godfrey, Frank Pike, a junior bank clerk at Martins Bank and Wilson's nephew, and spiv Joe Walker. The platoon is ordered to take part in a training weekend, taking part in wargame exercises. The platoon, under Mainwaring's command, unintentionally sabotage the first day, angering Major-General Fullard, who is already annoyed with Mainwaring for previously refusing to cash his cheque at the bank, under the impression that Mainwaring is merely a bank clerk.

The next morning, the platoon are detailed to hold a pontoon bridge during the day's exercise. The bridge has been sabotaged by the Royal Marines, causing Mainwaring's platoon to fail the assignment. Mainwaring is summoned by Fullard and told that, due to the platoon's poor performance, he will recommend Mainwaring be replaced.

While the platoon are walking back to Walmington, a Luftwaffe reconnaissance aircraft is shot down and its three-man crew parachutes to safety. That night, the Luftwaffe team enter Walmington Church Hall where a meeting is taking place. The Germans take all those present as hostages, including the mayor and vicar, and demand a boat back to France.

Returning to town, Mainwaring's platoon meet at the church to attend the meeting, where they learn of the situation. Dressed in choir surplices, the platoon infiltrate the building though the church crypt, singing "All Things Bright and Beautiful", with their own extemporised second verse detailing how they plan to overpower the Germans. Mainwaring takes a revolver concealed under a collection plate and confronts the Luftwaffe leader, who aims his Luger pistol at him. Both officers agree they will shoot at the count of three; Mainwaring warns the Germans that if he dies, seven men will take his place, to which the platoon draw their rifles from beneath their white robes. Reluctantly, the Germans surrender. An impressed Fullard congratulates Mainwaring and his platoon, who are deemed local heroes.

Later, Wilson informs Mainwaring that the German officer's gun was empty; Mainwaring reveals his gun was empty also. In the closing scene, Mainwaring's platoon meet at the white cliffs of Dover, vowing to combat the German threat until the war is over.

== Cast ==
- Arthur Lowe as Captain Mainwaring
- John Le Mesurier as Sergeant Wilson
- Clive Dunn as Lance Corporal Jones
- John Laurie as Private Frazer
- James Beck as Private Walker
- Arnold Ridley as Private Godfrey
- Ian Lavender as Private Pike
- Liz Fraser as Mrs Pike
- Bernard Archard as Major General Fullard
- Derek Newark as Regimental Sergeant Major
- Bill Pertwee as Chief ARP Warden Hodges
- Frank Williams as the Vicar
- Edward Sinclair as the Verger
- Anthony Sagar as Police Sergeant
- Pat Coombs as Mrs Hall
- Roger Maxwell as Peppery Old Gent (General Wilkinson)
- Paul Dawkins as Nazi General
- Sam Kydd as Nazi Orderly
- Michael Knowles as Staff Captain
- Fred Griffiths as Bert King
- John Baskcomb as the Mayor

== Production ==
=== Development ===
In 1970, following the release of the third series of the television sitcom Dad's Army, filmmaker Norman Cohen approached writers Jimmy Perry and David Croft about adapting their television series into a film. Cohen, who had already directed the film adaptation of television sitcom Till Death Us Do Part (1965–1975) in 1968, offered the two writers a £300 advance in order to source investors for the film. The writers wrote a synopsis which Cohen showed to potential investors; Cohen, along with his agent Greg Smith, eventually secured a deal with US-based producer John R. Sloan and Hollywood studio Columbia Pictures. Croft and Perry were optimistic about the film, which would allow them freedom to write a more detailed story, using a larger budget than television allowed. Cohen, who was enthusiastic for the project, had not seen an episode of Dad's Army before directing the film, which concerned the cast.

=== Pre-production ===
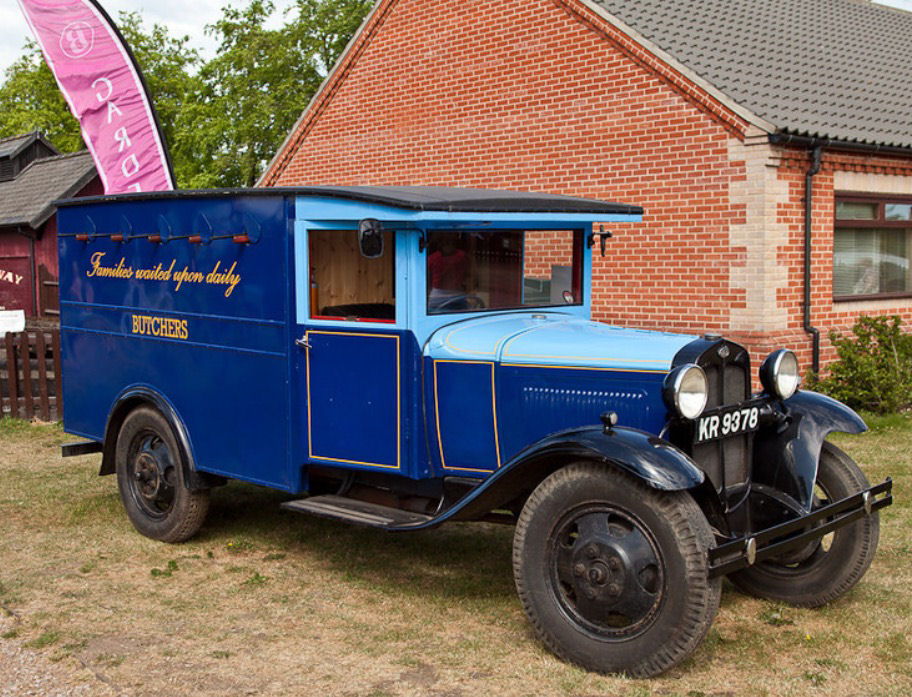
The 1930s Ford Model AA used in the film.

Columbia Pictures imposed several changes from the television series, which concerned and disappointed the cast and crew of the original series. The studio chose to recast the role of Mrs Pike, who was played by Janet Davies in the television series, instead choosing Liz Fraser, believing Fraser, who had previously appeared in the Carry On films, to be a more well-known actress, while director Cohen wanted a less homely, more "sexy" actress for the role. In 1997, Perry recalled that, "It was a mistake [...] not to cast Janet in the role because the viewing public has come to recognise her as Mrs. Pike. But that was a decision made by Columbia."

Corporal Jones's van, which was a 1935 Fordson Model BB box van in the television series, was replaced with a 1930s Ford Model AA for the film. A second signature tune, in addition to "Who Do You Think You Are Kidding, Mr Hitler?", was also proposed. The bank was renamed Martins Bank (a genuine bank of the time), as opposed to Swallow. However, Perry had originally wanted to use the Martins Bank name for the television series before a copyright issue prompted him to change it to Swallow Bank. With the increase in budget, the streets of Walmington-on-Sea were populated with extras, rather than being empty. Additionally, the film explicitly showed the German forces, rather than them being a mostly-unseen threat in the television series, which Ian Lavender believed resulted in "much of the cosiness, the charm, of the television show [being] lost". Lavender was critical of the changes imposed by Columbia, believing the studio's attitude to be, "We're doing the film, we'll do it differently."

=== Production ===
Three weeks before filming began, Columbia terminated Cohen's contract. In 2000, Croft recalled that, "I was told [by representatives of Columbia] that they'd had a lot of trouble with Norman Cohen and they asked me to take over." Croft refused, explaining how he "[didn't] really like the script now". believing that the film had been "rewritten for him, to his specifications, and there are quite a lot of things which I think I could have done much, much better". Croft did not believe Cohen was competent as director, but was busy with other projects at the time, so refused. Perry acted as technical advisor for the film, but felt Columbia were in too much control, saying in 2000 that, "It was obvious the decision-making power had been taken out of our hands: they were going to do what they were going to do." However, he did make certain changes when he felt necessary. With no replacement, Cohen remained as director, being pressured by producer Sloan and Columbia executives to continue progress with the film. The main cast felt uncomfortable with Columbia's involvement. The platoon's second row of cast members were treated merely as extras, which concerned the main cast.

The screenplay, written by Croft and Perry, was revised by Cohen to be more cinematic, before being further revised for filmic purposes by Columbia, in order to help quicken the pace and strengthen the plot. John Le Mesurier, writing in his autobiography A Jobbing Actor (1984), believed the screenplay was "little more than three half hour episodes joined together". The first two-thirds of the screenplay was a retelling of the first television series.

=== Filming ===
While outdoor scenes for the television series had been filmed in Thetford, Norfolk, Columbia Pictures chose Chalfont St Giles in Buckinghamshire for outdoor filming, in order to assist with making the film's story more "dynamic". Ian Lavender recalled in 2000 that most of the changes "struck us as arbitrary", stating that the new filming location "wasn't any nearer to the seaside". Additional outdoor filming locations included Chobham in Surrey and Seaford, East Sussex. Columbia Pictures expected the film to be completed in six weeks, an extremely short time period that, according to writer Graham McCann, sent a "clear message" to the cast and crew that they "would not be encouraged to pause and polish". The first day of filming began on 10 August 1970 at Shepperton Studios, Middlesex. At the time, the British film industry was in decline, and, for the first week of filming, Dad's Army was the only film being made at the studios. Filming also took place on 29 August and 5 September at the church of St Mary Magdalene, Littleton, which is adjacent to Shepperton Studios. Filming concluded on 25 September, with the completion of a few minor inserts.

== Release ==
Dad's Army was passed with a U certificate by the British Board of Film Classification on 27 January 1971. It premiered in the United Kingdom on 12 March 1971 at the Columbia Theatre in London. It was first broadcast on BBC1 on 5 May 1979, attracting audience viewing figures of thirteen million.

== Reception ==
Critical reviews were mixed, but it was the fifth most financially successful film at the United Kingdom box office of the year. It gained a score of 31% on Rotten Tomatoes, and a score of 6.9/10 via IMDb.

The Monthly Film Bulletin wrote: "A reliable method of luring the public away from its television sets and back to the cinema is to remould successful TV series for the big screen. Dad's Army, like Till Death Us Do Part, has been done over in this way, with the usual loss of intimacy and subtlety of characterisation which the leisure of a weekly series allows. In this case, grooming for the cinema means the introduction of coarsening and inflating elements which overwhelm, almost to extinction, the fragile, nostalgic humour of the original. ... Though the scriptwriters are the same, even the verbal humour is cruder."

In The Radio Times Guide to Films David Parkinson gave the film 3/5 stars, writing: "As with so many other TV spin-offs, the producers couldn't resist tinkering with the winning formula, and here we are treated to a Nazi invasion of Walmington-on-Sea that is somewhat at odds with the cosy incompetence that made the series so irresistible. But this is still great fun and it's always a pleasure to see such gifted character actors at work."

Leslie Halliwell wrote "A pleasant souvenir but rather less effective than was expected because everything is shown – the town, the Nazis, the wives – and thus the air of gentle fantasy disappears, especially in the face of much coarsened humour."

Richard Webber, in his book The Complete A-Z of Dad's Army (2000), wrote that, although many film adaptations of sitcoms became "pallid versions of the original concept", the Dad's Army film was "an exception", writing that the film was "warmly received and still enjoys regular outings on TV".

== Proposed sequel ==
Despite the film performing well at the box office, Croft and Perry were disappointed with the film. Following its release, the writers decided to draft an outline for a proposed sequel, titled Dad's Army and the Secret U-Boat Base. The film was to be set in a small coastal town in North Wales, beginning with the sinking of several British warships in the Irish Sea. The War Office suspects the Germans have established a secret U-boat base along the coast, so, rather than arouse suspicion by sending the Regular Army, the War Office sends the Walmington-on-Sea Home Guard to investigate the area. Once there, the platoon discover that Nazi troops are posing as the workers of a manor house; beneath the house is the secret base. Eventually, the Germans take the platoon hostage in one of their U-boats, intending to travel to Germany to show the ineptitude of the British Home Guard. However, the platoon overpower the Germans, before realising they do not know how to drive the submarine.

The outline was distributed to interested film companies. Laurence Olivier, a fan of the series, read the outline and expressed interest in portraying the lead Nazi character, posing as the lord of the manor. However, the project never came to fruition, as funding for the film was slow to eventuate, and Croft and Perry became distracted by their other television series. Additionally, Perry stated in 2000 that he and Croft were "very busy" at the time and "didn't think the first film had succeeded, so we dropped the whole idea".

A second film was released in 2016 with an almost entirely new cast, also titled Dad's Army.
