= Thetford Guildhall =

Municipal building in Thetford, Norfolk, England

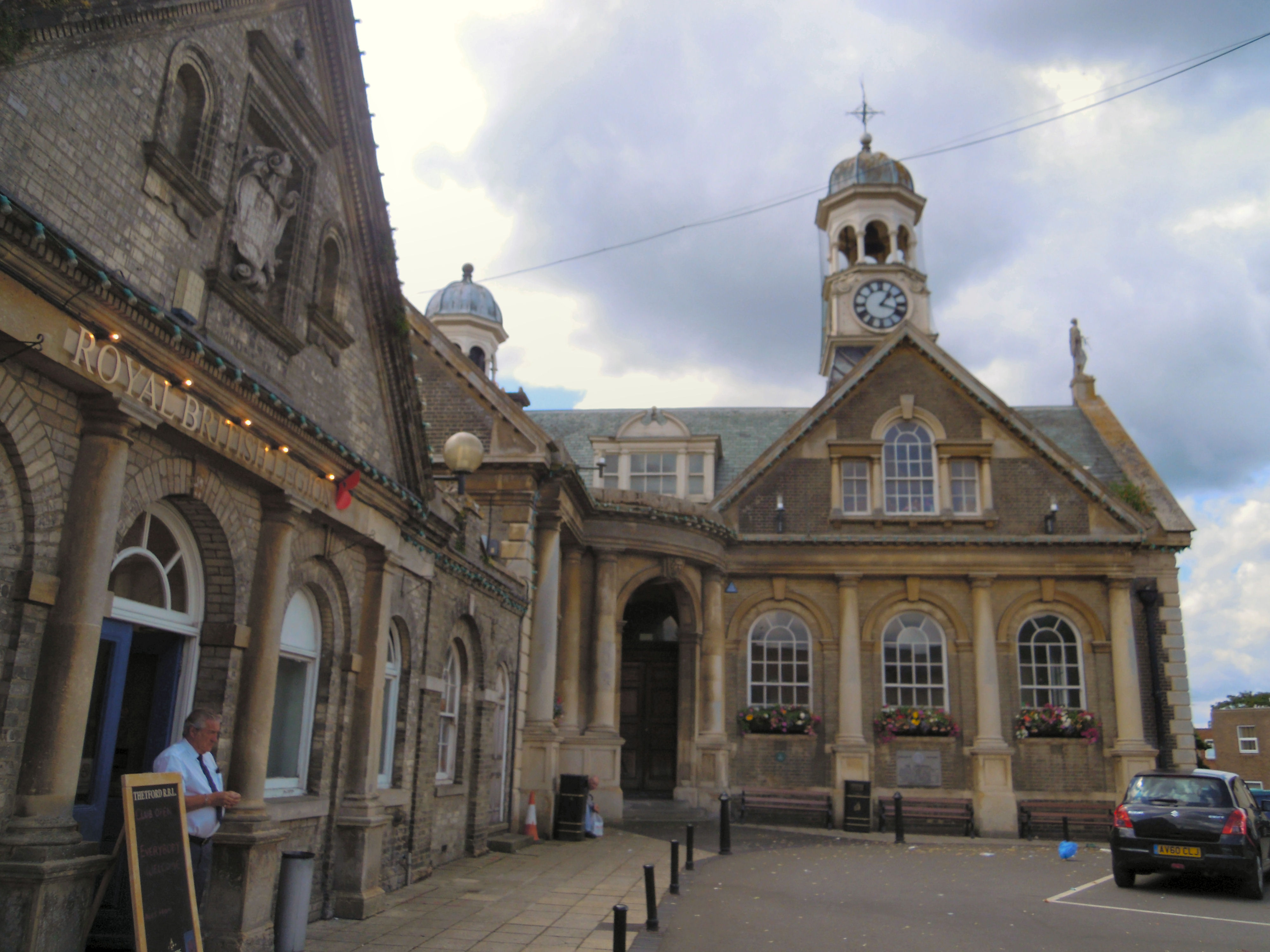
- Thetford Guildhall

- Shown in Norfolk
- 52.4130°N 0.7506°E
- Location: Market Place, Thetford

History
- Built: 1901

Site notes
- Architect: Herbert John Green
- Architectural style: Neoclassical style

Listed Building – Grade II
- Official name: Guildhall
- Designated: 10 March 1971
- Reference no.: 1207867

Thetford Guildhall is a municipal structure in the Market Place in Thetford, Norfolk, England. The town hall, which was the headquarters of Thetford Borough Council, is a Grade II listed building.

== History ==
The first building on the site was the hall of the Guild of St Mary which was a medieval structure built in black flint and completed in 1337. Following the Dissolution of the Guilds in 1547, ownership of the building passed to Thetford Corporation when it received its royal charter from Queen Elizabeth I in 1574. The local member of parliament, Sir Joseph Williamson, enlarged the building at his own expense in around 1675, and a local workhouse was established the basement in around 1700. After the medieval structure was found to be unsafe, it was remodelled with a new council chamber and a new courthouse in 1799.

Following a structural survey in the late 19th century, it was discovered that the foundations of the old building were defective and civic leaders decided to rebuild the structure again. The new building was designed by Herbert John Green in the neoclassical style, built in ashlar stone and completed in 1901. The design involved a main frontage at the south west corner of the Market Place: it featured a porch in the corner with one bay to the left facing north and three bays to the right facing east. The doorway within the porch was flanked by Doric order columns supporting a frieze, while the bays to the left and right contained round headed sash windows which were also flanked by Doric order pilasters supporting the frieze. Above the right hand section was a gable containing a Venetian window and, above the gable, there was a clock with a cupola and a weather vane. The town hall continued to serve as the headquarters of the borough until the council relocated to new chambers and offices at King's House in King Street in 1952. A plaque commemorating the airmen of No. 311 Squadron RAF, a Czechoslovak-manned bomber squadron based at RAF Honington during the Second World War, was placed in the bay to the left of the entrance to the guildhall in 1980.

After the guildhall featured in several episodes of the BBC comedy series Dad's Army in the early 1970s, the Dad's Army Museum opened at the rear of the guildhall in December 2007 and was extended into the basement in February 2009. In June 2020, Thetford Town Council announced that a heritage hub would be established in the guildhall. It was planned that the hub would include an exhibition about the last ruler of the Sikh Empire, Maharaja Duleep Singh, who had settled at Elveden Hall in the 19th century, as well as a display of paintings collected by the Maharaja's son, Prince Frederick.
