= Jones's van (Dad's Army) =

Butcher's delivery vehicle used in Dad's Army

Jones's van (1935 Fordson Model BB)
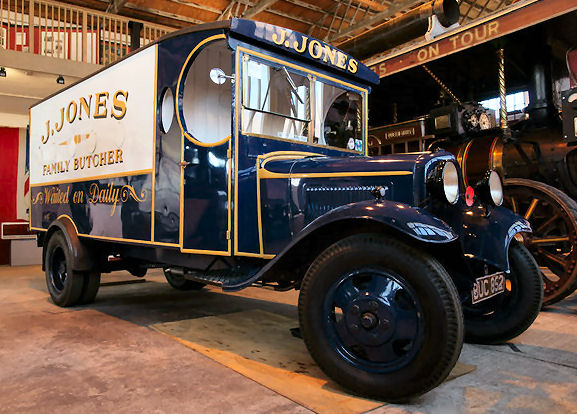
- Jones's van displayed at the Charles Burrell Museum, Thetford in 2015.

Overview
- Type: Box van
- Manufacturer: Fordson
- Production: 1935
- Assembly: England: Dagenham, Essex (Ford Dagenham)

Powertrain
- Engine: 3445 cc

Dimensions
- Kerb weight: Two imperial tons

Jones's van is a butcher's delivery van owned by the fictional character Lance Corporal Jones from the British television sitcom Dad's Army. It made its debut appearance in the first episode of the third series, "The Armoured Might of Lance Corporal Jones" (1969), and appeared nineteen times throughout the series until 1977. The van is a 1935 two-ton Fordson Model BB box van.

After the series ended, the van was sold to a Ford dealer in Finchley, before being bought by the Patrick Motor Museum in 1990. The van was auctioned by Bonhams and sold to the Dad's Army Museum in 2012, where it has remained since. The van later appeared in the 2016 Dad's Army film.

A different van, a 1930s Ford Model AA, was used for the 1971 Dad's Army film. As of 2026, this van is housed in the Bressingham Steam and Gardens as part of their Dad's Army collection.

== Appearances ==
=== Dad's Army ===
Jones's van is owned by the fictional character Lance Corporal Jones (portrayed by Clive Dunn) from the British television sitcom Dad's Army (1968–1977), who used it as a butcher's delivery van. The van first appeared in the first episode of the third series, "The Armoured Might of Lance Corporal Jones", which was first broadcast on 11 September 1969; it made a total of nineteen appearances until the series concluded in 1977.

While it is doubtful that a small local butcher like Jones would have needed so large a van in real life, let alone have been able to finance its running costs during wartime, the van becomes essential in the series as a means of primary transportation of the Walmington-on-Sea platoon. The platoon uses Jones's van as transport and an improvised infantry fighting vehicle for their manoeuvres, with holes cut into the van's side panels and roof to allow the platoon to point their rifles out of the van to defend against enemy invasion. On one occasion in its debut appearance, the van was converted to run on gas as an alternative to fuel; a large bag filled with gas, a "gas bag", was strapped to the van's roof for this episode. In "The Day the Balloon Went Up" (1969), the eighth episode of the third series, the platoon use the van to pursue platoon leader Captain Mainwaring after he is carried off by a barrage balloon. The van's final appearance occurs in "Number Engaged" (1977), the fifth episode of the ninth series, in which the platoon use it to reach a two-mile stretch of telephone wires located along the coast, which the platoon have to guard.

=== Other appearances ===
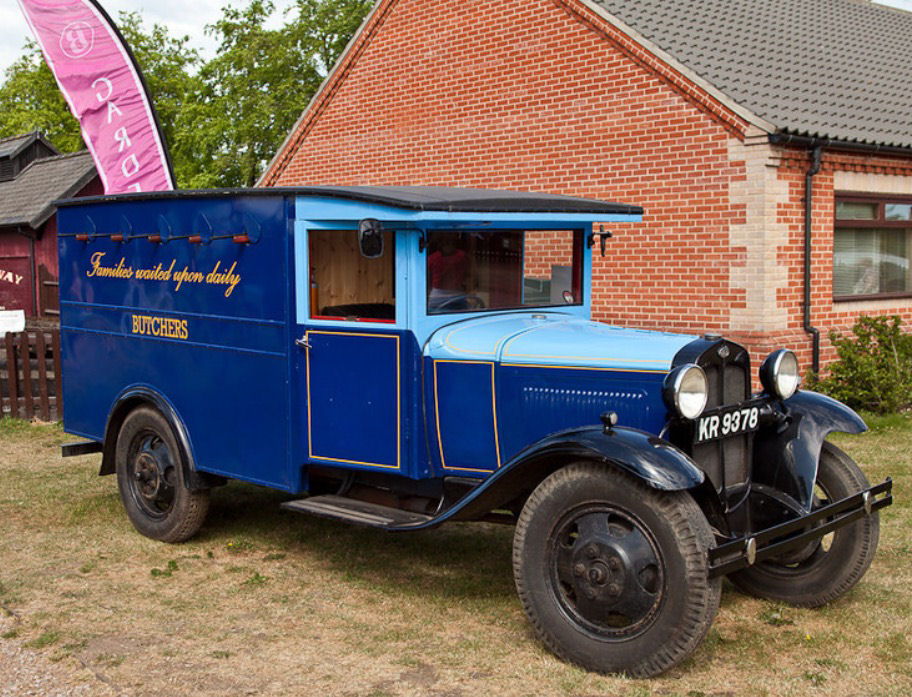
The Ford Model AA used in the 1971 Dad's Army film, as pictured in 2011.

A different van was used for the 1971 Dad's Army film, a 1930s closed cab Ford Model AA (registration plate KR 9378). When Dad's Army was adapted for film, Columbia Pictures made several changes, including changing filming locations and changing Jones's van. Ian Lavender, who played Private Pike in the film and series, stated in 2000 that "most of the changes struck us as arbitrary" and questioned why it was necessary to change Jones's van. Once the film was released, this van was housed in a private museum in Reading, before being sold at auction to a man from Lincolnshire, shortly before the year 2000. As of February 2026, the van is part of the Dad's Army collection held at the Bressingham Steam and Gardens.

In 1979, the original van was seen in episodes of Dick Barton: Special Agent, with the distinctive side panels (sign-painted with "J. Jones Family Butcher") covered to disguise the van. The van also appeared in the comedy crime film The Stick Up (1977), driven by lead actor David Soul, and the spy film Eye of the Needle (1981). It appeared in the documentary Don't Panic!: The Dad's Army Story (2000), where it was driven by presenter Victoria Wood. Having been fully restored, the van appeared in the 2016 Dad's Army film.

== History ==
=== Manufacturing and use in Dad's Army ===
Jones's van is a 1935 two-ton Fordson Model BB box van (registration plate BUC 852), 3445 cc, one of the first commercial models produced at Ford's Dagenham factory when it opened in 1931. During World War II, it spent most of its working life in Central London, being used as a confectioner's van and a baker's van. In the 1960s, long before Dad's Army was first broadcast in 1968, it was discovered in a dilapidated condition in Streatham, London by Frank Holland, an assistant property master for the BBC. Holland contacted Fred Wilmington, whose company loaned vehicles to the BBC; after enquiring with the police as to the vehicle's ownership, Wilmington purchased the van, which had been stationary for months, and restored it to full working order.

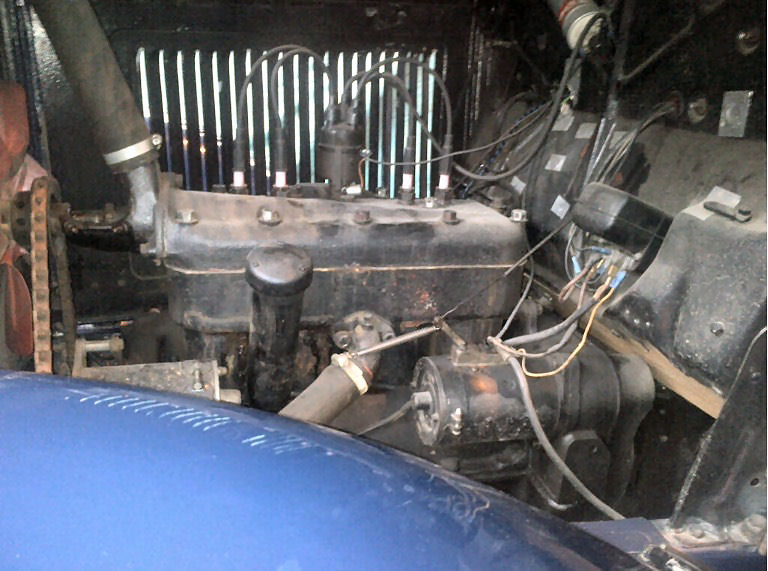
The original 1935 engine of Jones's van, as pictured in 2015.

Later, Paul Joel, a designer working on Dad's Army, saw the van among Wilmington's stock of vehicles and obtained it for use in the series. Joel had to persuade Wilmington's company to make the vehicle roadworthy, which they "just about did". At the request of Joel, holes were cut into the van's side panels and part of the roof was altered by Wilmington's company, to allow the cast members to point their rifles out of the van to defend against enemy invasion. Additionally, the van was repainted navy and white, and "J. Jones Family Butcher" was sign-painted on its side panels. The florid, late-Victorian-style lettering was designed by Joel, to reflect the personality of Corporal Jones and to reflect his butcher's shop. Joel "really enjoyed" designing the van, describing it as the "most delightful" of the "big prop[s]" he worked on for the series.

When filming studio sequences involving the van in motion, a blue screen was placed alongside the van and a moving background would be displayed onto the screen, imitating the van's movement. Combining scenes filmed on location and studio sequences involving the van was challenging and "a very complex job", according to sound supervisor Michael McCarthy; the footage for both would have to be intercut with one another for the scene to appear smoothly. When not used for filming Dad's Army by the BBC, the van was kept in its Dad's Army paintwork; however, false sides were constructed, which could be slotted into channelling on the side of the vehicle, allowing the van to be used as a regular-looking vehicle in other programmes.

Among the assorted period vehicles used in the series, which were carefully chosen in order to keep the series authentic, the van, according to writer Graham McCann, "became a great favourite", being used in "a series of memorable set pieces". Additionally, McCann wrote that, according to Clive Dunn, "There was never any shortage of volunteers to sit behind its steering-wheel when the vehicle was off-camera." In the 2018 documentary Saluting Dad's Army, presenter Alexander Armstrong described the van as a "truly magnificent vehicle".

=== After Dad's Army ===
When Dad's Army ended in 1977, the van was sold to a Ford dealer in Finchley, where it was displayed prominently in their showroom. It was sold at auction on 26 November 1990 to the Patrick Motor Museum in Birmingham. On 3 December 2012, the van was auctioned by Bonhams, where it was sold to the Pearson and Jenkins families for £63,100, including the buyer's premium (equivalent to £90,741 in 2025). The Jenkins family donated their half of the van to the Dad's Army Museum in Thetford, while the museum began raising funds to buy the other half of the van; the museum had previously been intending to purchase the van at the auction. By the end of December, the museum had raised £10,000 of the £63,100 required for purchase. By the end of March 2013, when £20,000 had been raised, the van went on public display at the Charles Burrell Museum after a period of cosmetic restoration.

By February 2016, the van was fully restored for use in the Dad's Army film. The restoration, completed at the van's original Ford Dagenham factory where it was built, included a full engine rebuild, a clutch replacement, and the fitting of new wiring looms. Following restoration, the van was rehoused at the Dad's Army Museum. In 2017, the van and volunteers from the Dad's Army Museum took part in the Lord Mayor's Show. In December 2022, the van was named "Vehicle of the Month" by car-enthusiast website Facts Disc. A book detailing the history of the van, titled Jones's Van: The Journey, was published by Chris Garrod in April 2026. The book was released in part to help fund the restoration of the van, which required repairs worth £10,500, including the replacement of axle carriers and the replication of van parts that were no longer available. By the start of May, £1,200 was raised by supporters of the Dad's Army Museum. By the start of June, the funds had been raised, with plans for the van to attend the Old Buckenham Air Show and the Royal Norfolk Show, the latter for the first time. However, the van broke down at the Bressingham Steam and Gardens, requiring additional funds of £1,500. Despite this, the van is expected to attend the 2026 Lord Mayor's Show in London.

== Merchandise ==
Various toy versions of the van were commercially available, including one made as part of a series of Dad's Army and wartime vehicles by the BBC and Radio Times, dubbed the "Radio Times Vintage Comedy Classics Collection", manufactured by Lledo. Additionally, Corgi released a 1:50 scale model of a Thornycroft van as Jones's van, along with a figurine of Jones.
