= Dad's Army Museum =

Museum dedicated to the comedy series Dad's Army

- Established: 7 December 2007
- Location: Cage Lane in Thetford, Norfolk
- Coordinates: 52.412934°N 0.750606°E
- Type: Dad's Army
- Website: http://dadsarmythetford.org.uk/

The Dad's Army Museum is a museum located in Cage Lane in Thetford in Norfolk, England, dedicated to the BBC comedy series Dad's Army. Many of the outdoor locations were filmed in the local area. The museum is housed in the old fire station at the rear of Thetford Guildhall, which itself stood in for Walmington-on-Sea Town Hall in several of the episodes.

It is run by volunteers who, throughout the year, attend many 1940s events in East Anglia with Jones' Van.

== History ==
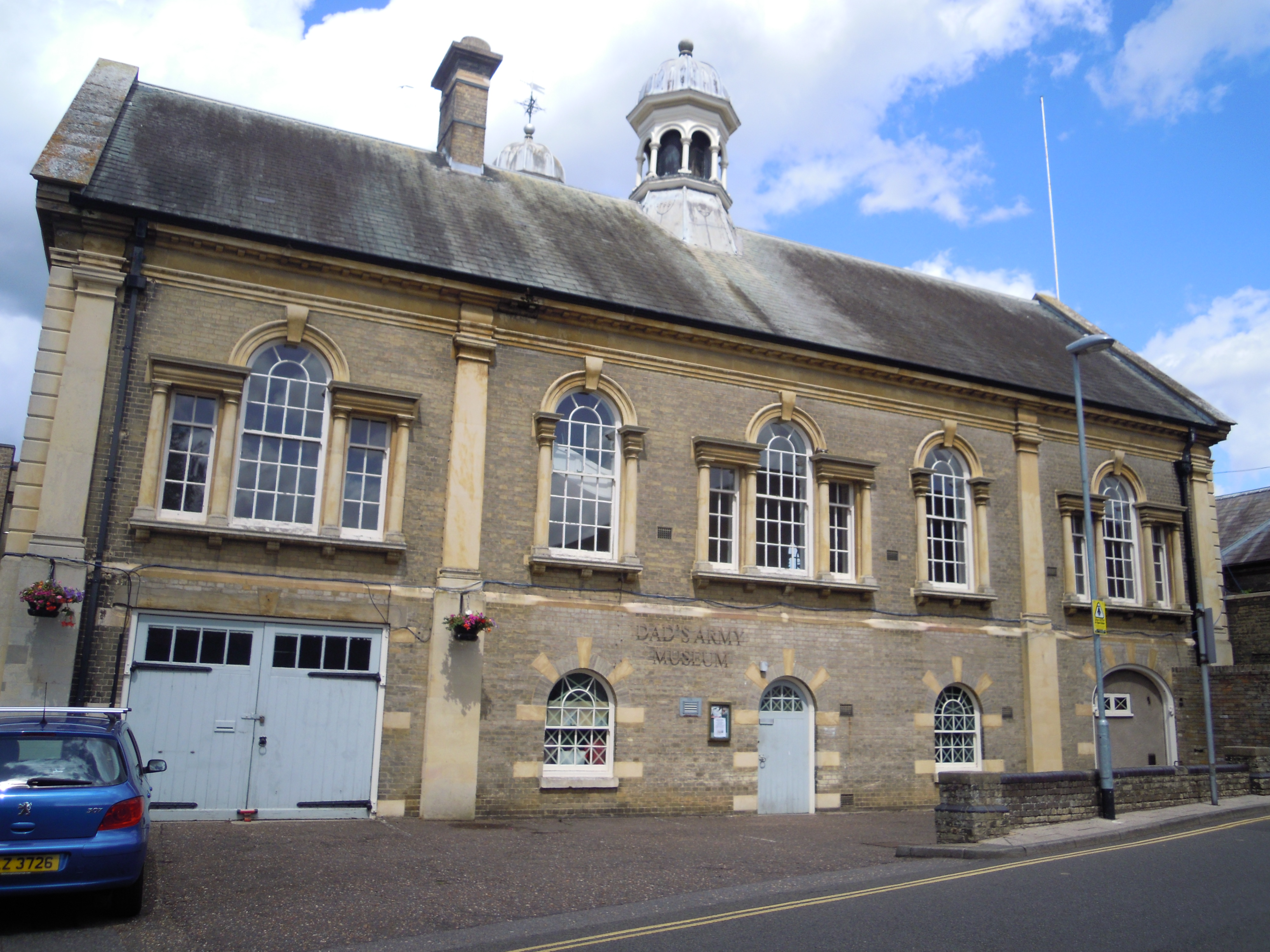
The exterior of the Dad's Army Museum

Thetford Guildhall, where the museum is based, featured in the 1972 episode "Time On My Hands", in which a German Luftwaffe pilot dangled from the clock tower when his parachute became caught in the clock's hands. The Guildhall was also used in a 1974 episode, "The Captain's Car".

The Dad's Army Museum was opened by Dad's Army co-writer David Croft on Friday, 7 December 2007, and includes a reconstruction of Captain Mainwaring's church hall office, several display areas, a shop and the Marigold Tea Room. The museum displays many unique photographs (many from the collection of the Dad's Army Appreciation Society) along with other memorabilia and items connected with the series.

Uniforms on display include a replica of the red, be-medalled full dress uniform worn by Lance-Corporal Jones in the series, and others worn by the Home Guard.

== Jones' van ==
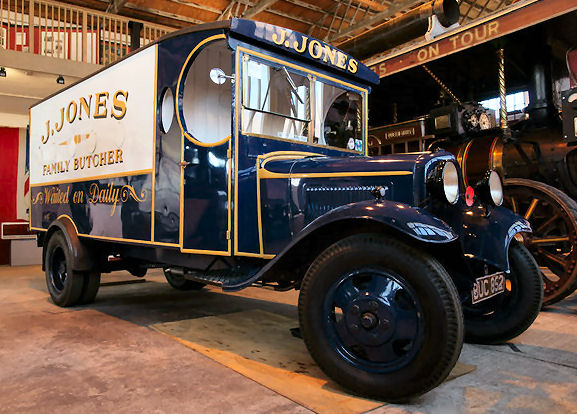
Jones' van was purchased by the Dad's Army Museum in the end of 2012

In December 2012, the museum bought the original Ford BB van used as Jones' butcher's van in the series for £63,100, including the premium. Because of limited space in the Dad's Army Museum, the van went on display at the nearby Charles Burrell Museum in March 2013 following a period of restoration.

== Gallery ==
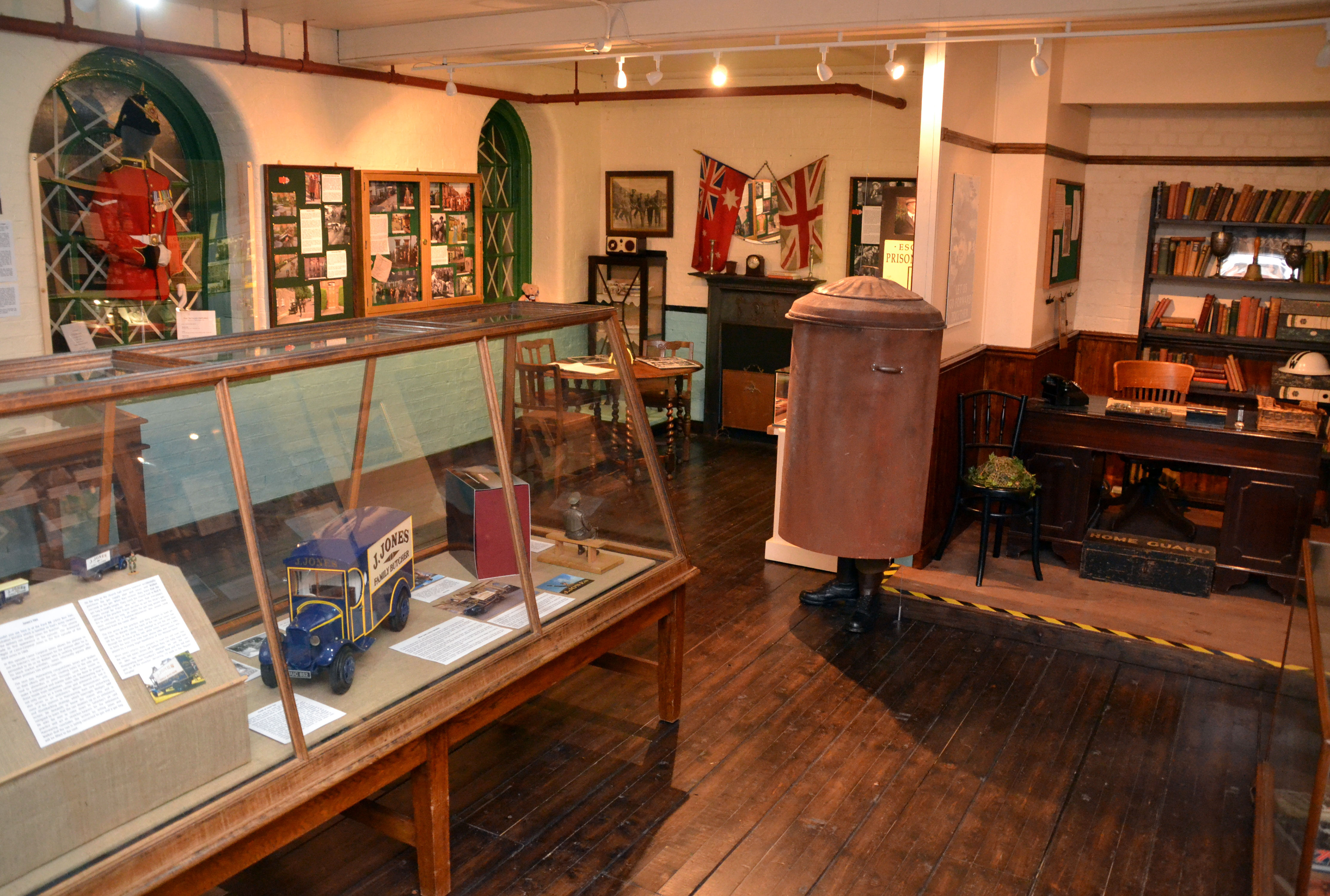
The Exhibition Hall

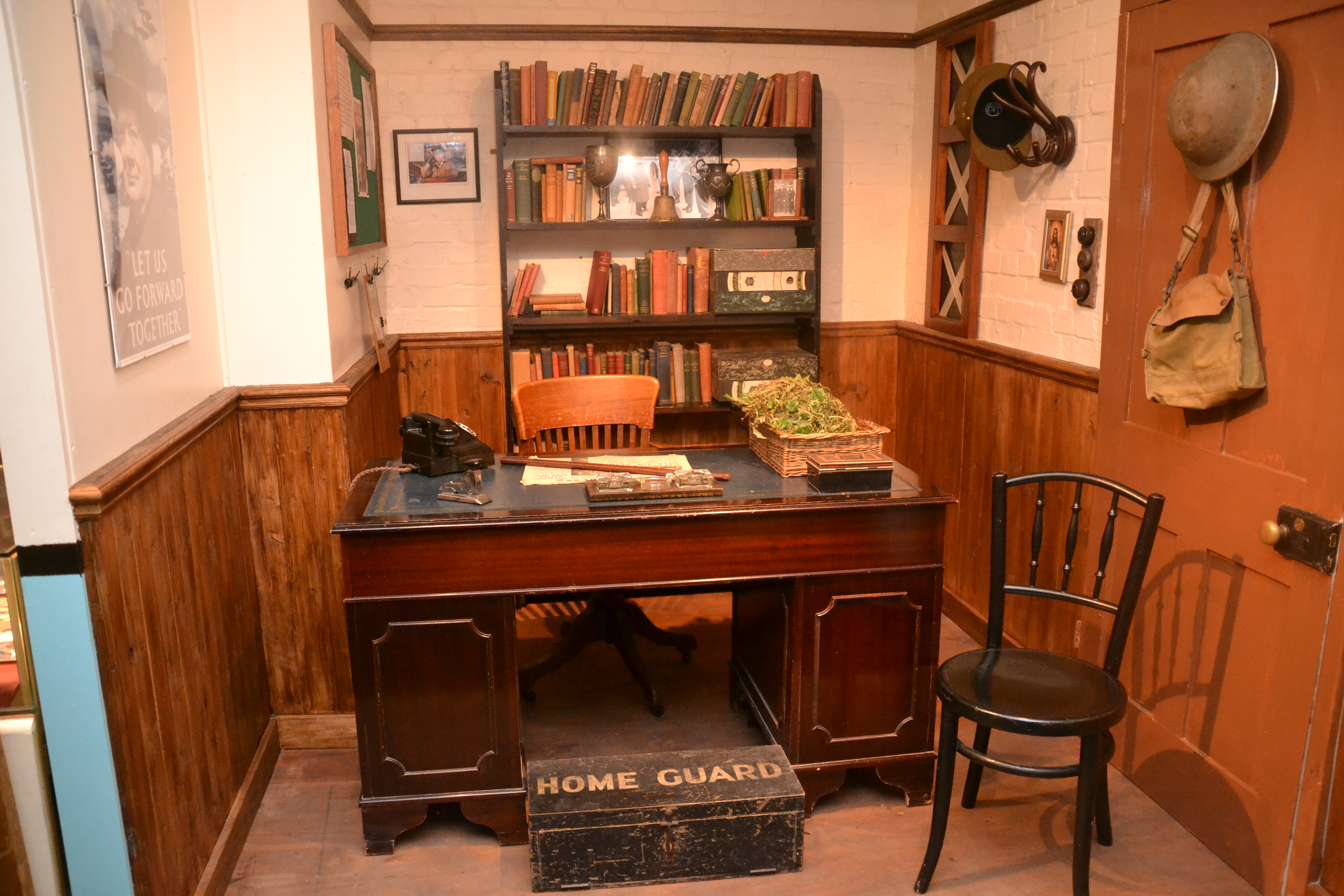
Captain Mainwaring's office

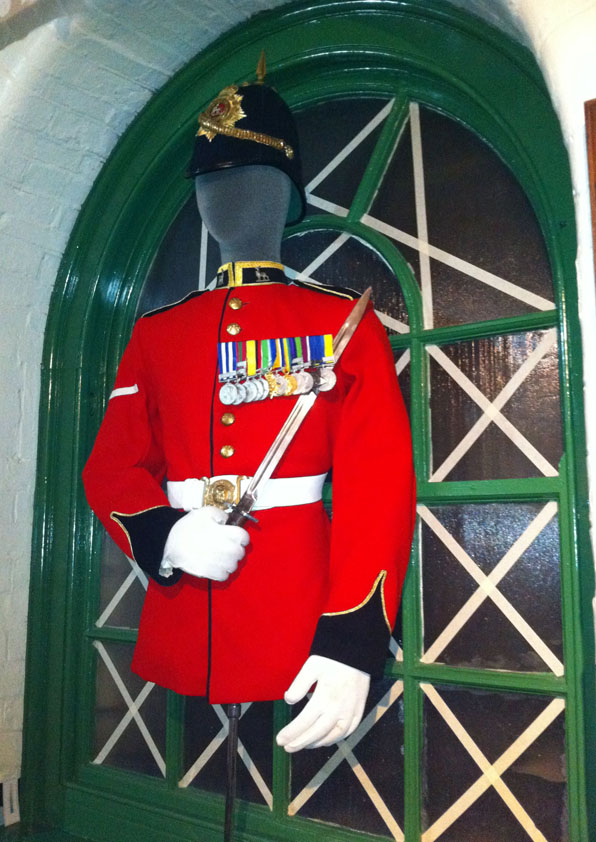
Lance-Corporal Jones' medals and tunic
