= The Armoured Might of Lance Corporal Jones =

- Dad's Army episode
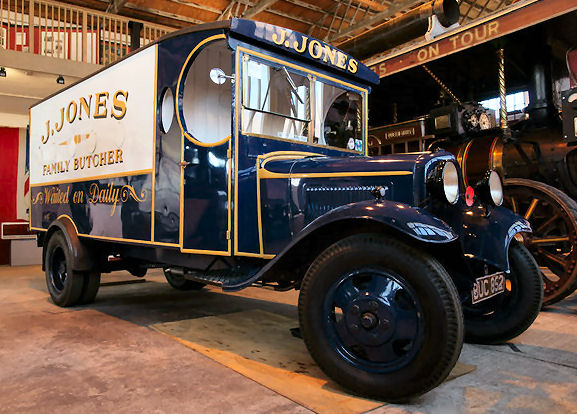
- Jones' van made its first appearance in this episode
- Episode no.: Series 3 Episode 1
- Directed by: David Croft
- Story by: Jimmy Perry and David Croft
- Original air date: 11 September 1969
- Running time: 30 minutes

Episode chronology
← Previous "Under Fire"	Next → "Battle School"

"The Armoured Might of Lance Corporal Jones" is the first episode of the third series of the British comedy series Dad's Army. It was originally transmitted on Thursday 11 September 1969. It is also the first episode to be made in colour, though it was originally broadcast in black and white.

== Synopsis ==
Lance Corporal Jones allows the platoon to use his butcher's van as an armoured car and Mainwaring meets the new Chief ARP Warden, William Hodges the greengrocer.

== Plot ==
Following a lecture on the gases the enemy will use, Captain Mainwaring reads a communiqué sent by GHQ, which says that there is insufficient communication between the ARP and the Home Guard, so the new Chief Warden is attending to discuss co-operation. Mainwaring is disgusted to learn from Wilson that the new Chief Warden is that "common fellow", greengrocer Mr Hodges. Mainwaring believes that Hodges' occupation does not entitle him to be Chief Warden. Wilson agrees by saying that he has dirty fingernails. When Hodges arrives, he and Mainwaring have a brief argument about who should get the church hall every Wednesday evening.

Sometime afterwards, Walker talks to Jones about his delivery van. He reckons that he should lend it to Mainwaring as platoon transport. Jones is suspicious, so Walker admits that it will help his black market activities, but offers Jones petrol coupons in return. Jones reluctantly agrees.

The next day, Mainwaring congratulates Jones and Walker on their efforts with the van. Jones tells Mainwaring that it not only serves as a troop carrier and armoured car, but it also serves as an ambulance. Wilson demonstrates with some of the platoon to Mainwaring, their new embarking and disembarking strategy, which interrupts Hodges' ARP lecture. He demands to know the reason why, and is intrigued to learn that the van doubles up as an ambulance. He asks the men to come down to Saturday's air raid practice and act as stretcher bearers for the ambulance. Mainwaring concludes the lecture by telling Jones and Walker that the van is being converted to gas.

Jones and Walker reluctantly travel to the church hall with a giant gasbag on the roof. Jones' bayonet accidentally punctures the gas supply pipe and Jones becomes light-headed. Walker plugs the hole in the pipe, and Jones tells him to "be like that little Belgian boy". Walker corrects him, realising that he is getting confused between Manneken Pis and the Little Dutch Boy. They reach the churchyard to find it empty except for Frazer, who tells them that everyone is already at the practice. Frazer decides the gas fire of the Vicar (the Reverend Timothy Farthing) can be used to refill the gas bag. The Vicar interrupts, but Frazer passes it off as filling the gas fire.

The trio arrive at the practice, and they prepare to load an old man on a stretcher into the back of the van, but Jones has left the back door keys at his shop. They attempt to put the old man through the front window of the van, while Jones "borrows" an irate man's bike to fetch the keys. When he returns, they try to load the old man into the van, but Hodges accidentally gives the signal of "two bangs" before they can fully load him on, and it drives off. After one more unsuccessful attempt, the old man gets up off the stretcher, declaring "I'll walk to the flippin' hospital!"

== Cast ==
- Arthur Lowe as Captain Mainwaring
- John Le Mesurier as Sergeant Wilson
- Clive Dunn as Lance Corporal Jones
- John Laurie as Private Frazer
- James Beck as Private Walker
- Arnold Ridley as Private Godfrey
- Ian Lavender as Private Pike
- Janet Davies as Mrs. Pike
- Bill Pertwee as ARP Warden Hodges
- Frank Williams as Vicar
- Queenie Watts as Mrs Peters
- Pamela Cundell as Mrs Fox
- Jean St. Clair as Miss Meadows
- Olive Mercer as Mrs Casson
- Nigel Hawthorne as the Angry Man
- Harold Bennett as the Old Man
- Dick Haydon as Raymond

== Notes ==
1. This is the first episode to be produced in colour. However, it was not the first episode to be seen in colour, as colour transmission on BBC1 did not officially launch until Saturday 15 November 1969, which meant the episode "Branded" was the first episode to be transmitted in colour.
2. This is the first episode to feature the vicar, Reverend Timothy Farthing (Frank Williams), in person.
3. This is the first episode to feature Jones's van, which the platoon use in future episodes.
4. The old man on the stretcher is Mr Bluett, as established in later episodes in a semi-regular role.
5. The episode could have got confused between town gas and laughing gas, since Jones becomes light-headed when the gas affects him.
