= Walmington-on-Sea =

Fictional seaside town in England

Map of the fictional Walmington-on-Sea from the Dad's Army Appreciation Society

Walmington-on-Sea is a fictional seaside resort that is the setting of Dad's Army during the Second World War, including the BBC Television sitcom (1968–1977), the BBC Radio 4 series, and two feature films of 1971 and 2016.

Walmington-on-Sea is a village on the south coast of England which, following the fall of France and the evacuation of the British Expeditionary Force from Dunkirk, found itself on the front line against Hitler.

The series followed the adventures and mishaps of members of a fictional platoon of the Local Defence Volunteers to later be called the Home Guard — a (real) WWII volunteer army that was formed from those ineligible for conscription, (by age, minor physical inability, or occupation), to defend the United Kingdom from German invasion following the fall of France.

== Location ==
In the series, Walmington-on-Sea's police station is depicted as part of the Kent Constabulary, and the series writers have described it as being "on that strip of Kent coast which endured so much". A writer for the Dad's Army Appreciation Society considers Littlestone-on-Sea, a village just north of the Kent headland of Dungeness, to be a likely analogue for the resort.

A 1989 BBC book on the series, written in character as if by Sergeant Wilson, describes the village as being in Sussex, and includes mentions of the Eastbourne Gazette.

George Mainwaring is described as having been educated at a grammar school in Eastbourne, to the west of the village, with and Dymchurch and Folkestone to the east. The village could equally could be further west by Winchelsea near Rye, Sussex as the geography is left deliberately vague.

== Amenities and filming locations ==
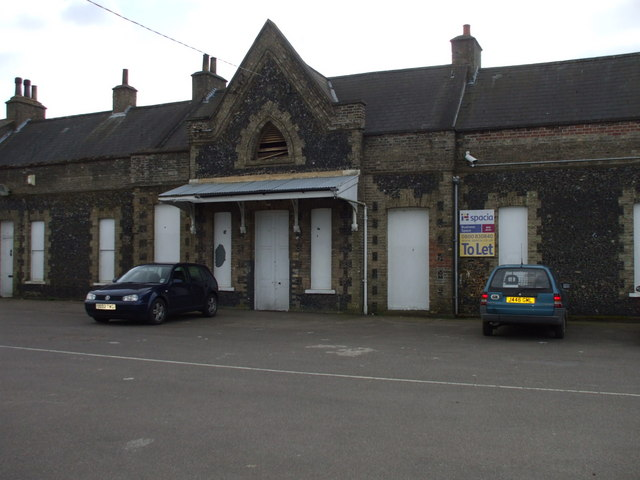
Brandon railway station stood in for the station at Walmington-on-Sea

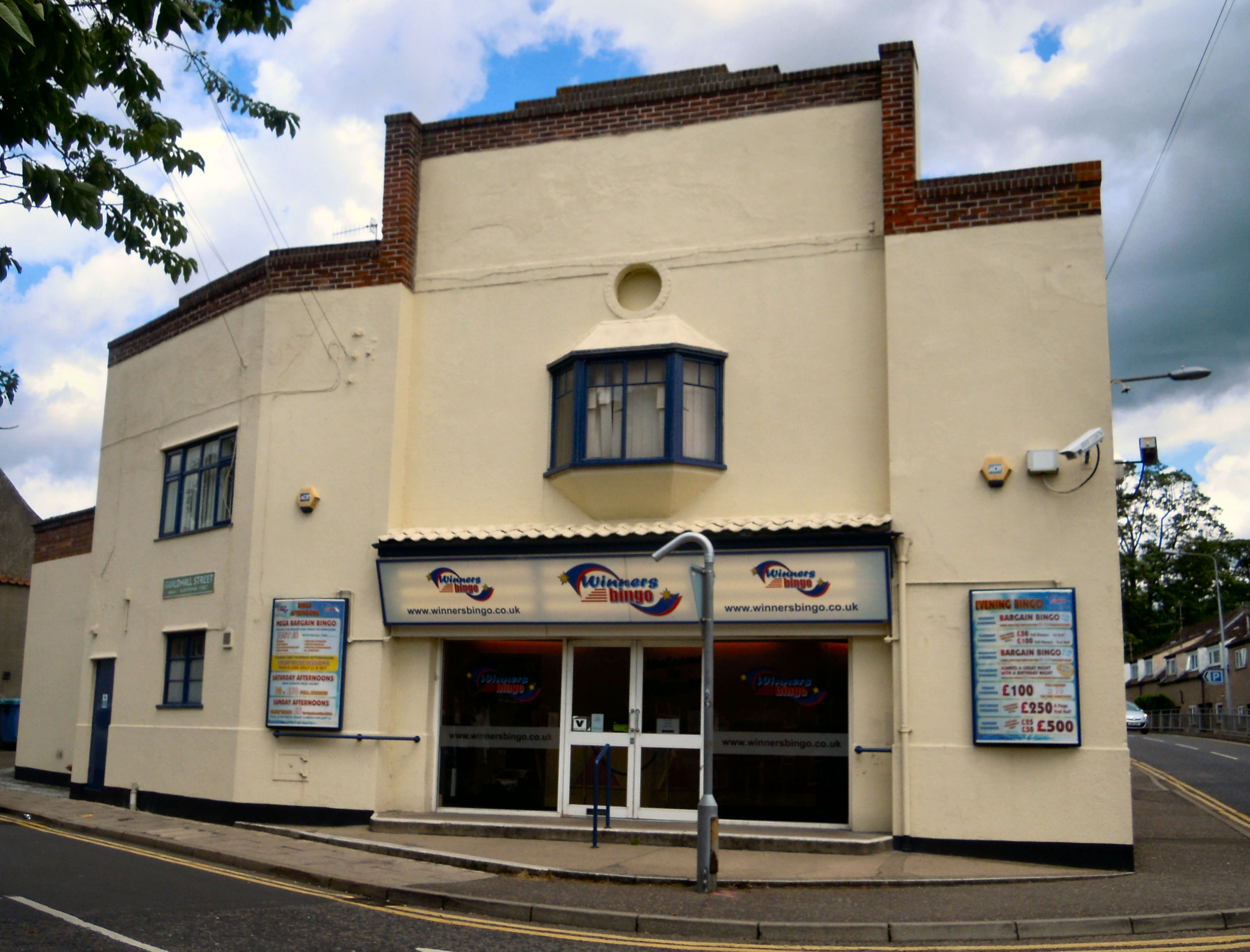
Thetford's Palace Cinema (now a bingo hall) doubled as Walmington's Empire Cinema

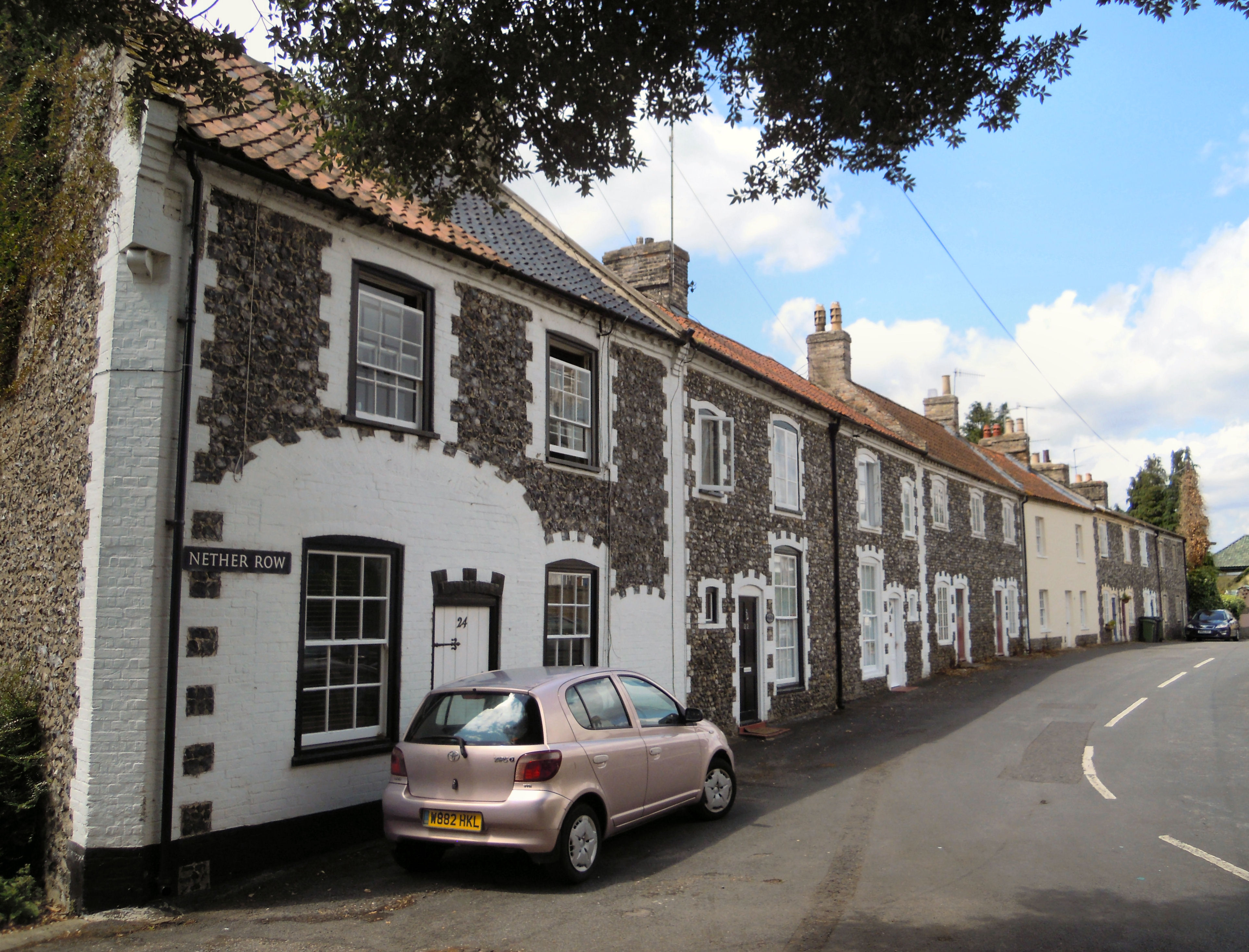
Several episodes were filmed at Nether Row in Thetford

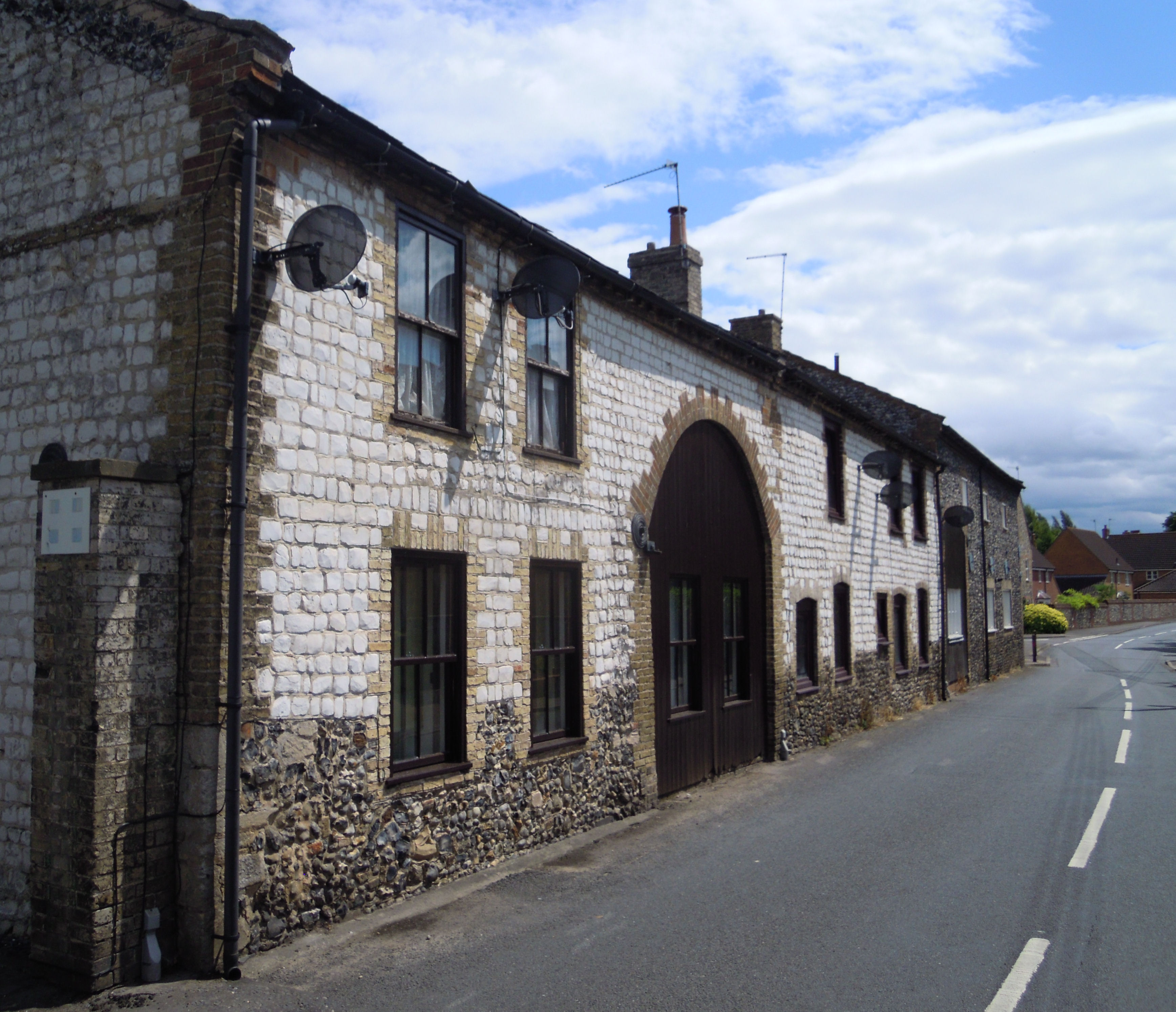
Filming of "The Deadly Attachment" took place on Mill Lane in Thetford

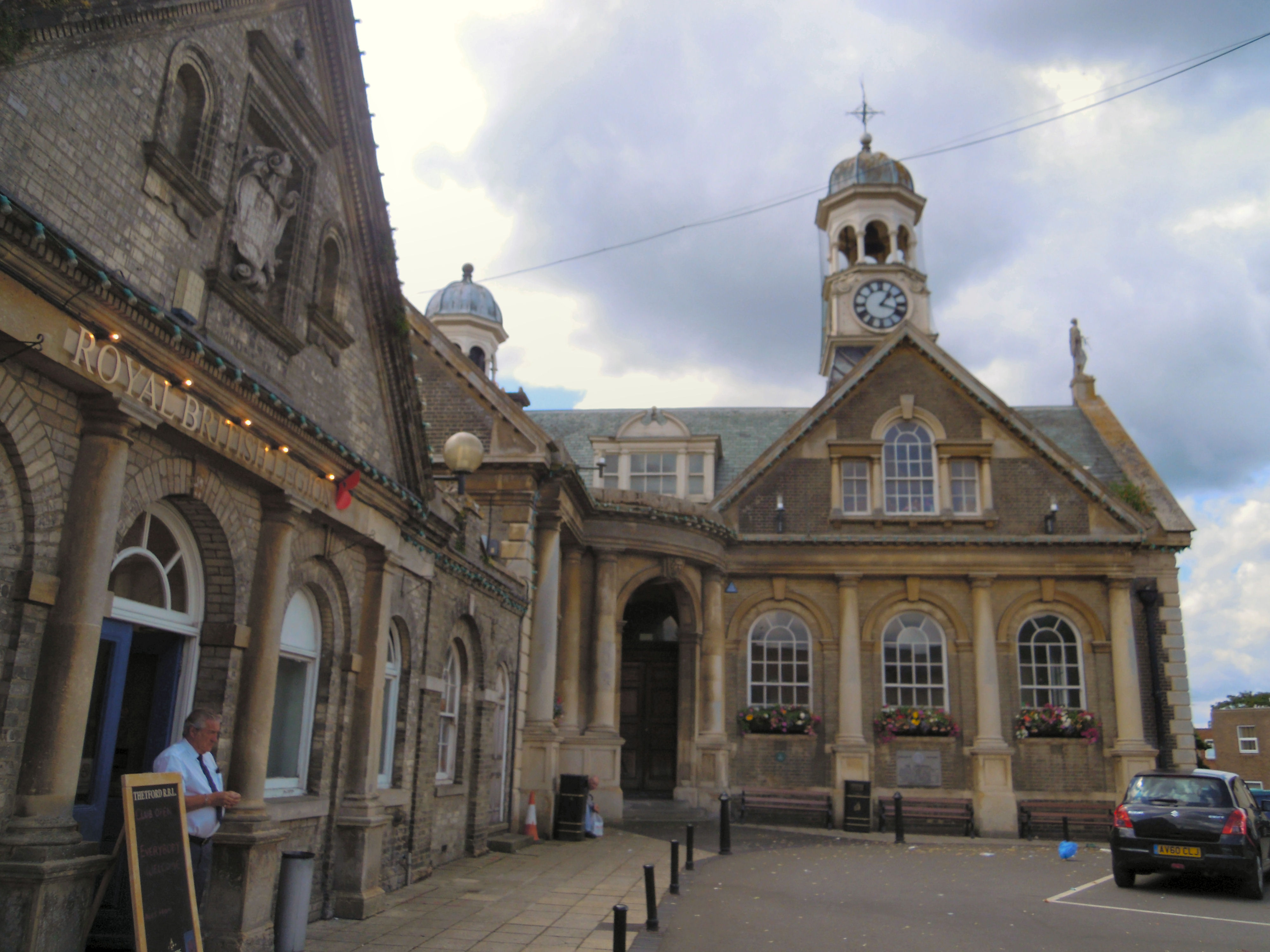
The Guildhall at Thetford became Walmington-on Sea's Town Hall

Over the nine television series, the action is set in various places in Walmington-on-Sea, the interiors of which were built in the television studios, while the exterior scenes were filmed at various Norfolk locations. Those included a pleasure pier (filmed in Great Yarmouth) sectioned with a gap, 20 foot (6 m) wide, blown in the middle to prevent it from being used as a landing stage by invading armed forces. The beach is protected with barbed wire and other defences including mines, pillboxes, and tank traps.

Other locations, typical of a seaside town during the Second World War, included at least two banks (the fictional Swallows Bank, which appeared in early episodes, and the real Martins Bank); Jones's butcher's shop; Hodges's greengrocers; Frazer's undertakers; a sweet shop, The Novelty Rock Emporium; tea rooms, the Marigold, Anne's Pantry, and the Dutch Oven; a cinema; and numerous pubs, including the Red Lion; which all suggest it was a reasonably sized place. There is also a Free Polish Club for Polish servicemen. In common with most real British towns, Walmington-on-Sea has a church, Saint Aldhelm's, with a church hall next door which is the setting for various community events in the episodes such as the Christmas pantomime and a place for the Sea Scouts to parade. It is also where the Walmington-on-Sea Home Guard platoon muster on parade nights.

Many outdoor scenes were filmed at Thetford, an inland town in Norfolk. The 1971 film, Dad's Army, moved location to Chalfont St Giles in Buckinghamshire, even further from the coast. The 2016 film, Dad's Army, was filmed even more distantly, in Yorkshire.

Thetford's Guildhall (today the home of the Dad's Army Museum) became Walmington-on-Sea's Town Hall. The Guildhall featured in the 1972 episode "Time on My Hands", in which a German Luftwaffe pilot dangled from the clock tower when his parachute became caught in the top of the building. The Guildhall was also used in the 1974 episode "The Captain's Car". The distinctive flint cottages in Thetford's Nether Row appeared in four episodes: "Man Hunt", "The Armoured Might of Lance Corporal Jones", "The Big Parade", and "Time on My Hands". Mill Lane was used in "The Deadly Attachment", while Thetford's real-life Palace Cinema (now a bingo hall) doubled as Walmington-on-Sea's Empire Cinema in two episodes – "The Big Parade" (1970) and "A Soldier's Farewell" (1972).

Brandon railway station was used for exterior shots of Walmington-on-Sea railway station, while the platforms of Weybourne Station on the preserved North Norfolk Railway (a heritage steam railway) stood in for the platforms at Walmington-on-Sea station in the episode "The Royal Train".
