= List of lost television broadcasts in the United Kingdom =

This is an incomplete list of lost television broadcasts that are lost to broadcasters in the United Kingdom.

== Associated-Rediffusion (ITV) ==
=== Badger's Bend ===
Of the 38 episodes made, 24 are missing, 13 survive and 1 survives with no audio.

Series	Episode No.	Episode Title	Original Broadcast Date	Notes
1	3	The Animal Hotel: Part 3	18 January 1963	
1	4	The Animal Hotel: Part 4	25 January 1963	
1	5	The Animal Hotel: Part 5	1 February 1963	
1	6	The Animal Hotel: Part 6	8 February 1963	
1	9	The Animal Hotel: Part 9	1 March 1963	
1	12	The Animal Hotel: Part 12	22 March 1963	
1	13	The Animal Hotel: Part 13	29 March 1963	
1	14	The Animal Hotel: Part 14	5 April 1963	
1	15	The Animal Hotel: Part 15	12 April 1963	
1	17	The Animal Hotel: Part 15	26 April 1963	
2	2	The Animal Hotel 2	8 October 1963	
2	3	The Animal Hotel 3	15 October 1963	
2	4	The Animal Hotel 4	22 October 1963	
2	5	The Animal Hotel 5	29 October 1963	Picture only exists - there is no sound.
2	6	The Animal Hotel 6	5 November 1963	
2	9	The Animal Hotel 9	26 November 1963	
2	13	The Animal Hotel 13	31 December 1963	
3	1	The Animal Hotel 1	7 January 1964	
3	2	The Animal Hotel 2	14 January 1964	
3	3	The Animal Hotel 3	21 January 1964	
3	4	The Animal Hotel 4	28 January 1964	
3	5	The Animal Hotel 5	4 February 1964	
3	6	The Animal Hotel 6	11 February 1964	
3	7	The Animal Hotel 7	18 February 1964	
3	8	The Animal Hotel 8	25 February 1964	

=== The Barnstormers ===
Of the 11 episodes made only episodes 1, 2 and 11 are missing.

=== The Blackness ===
All 6 episodes are missing.

=== The Citadel ===
All 9 episodes are missing.

=== Crane ===
Of the 39 episodes made, 37 are missing and only 2 survive.

=== The Devil in the Fog ===
Of the 6 episodes made only episode 5 is missing.

=== Jango ===
Out of the 8 episodes produced for the series, 7 of them are missing. The 7th episode produced for the series titled "Treacle on Three Fingers" is the only surviving episode of the series.

=== No Hiding Place ===
Of the 236 episodes made, 194 are missing, 30 survive in full and 12 survive incomplete.

=== Object Z Returns ===
All 6 episodes are missing.

=== Orlando ===
Of the 76 episodes made, 72 are missing and only 4 survive.

Series	Episode No.	Episode Title	Original Broadcast Date
1	1	The Silver Spoon	13 April 1965
1	2	Orlando Tells a Story	20 April 1965
1	3	A Ring of Dogs	27 April 1965
1	4	Humpty-Dumpty	4 May 1965
1	5	Mask of Fear	11 May 1965
1	6	The Black Snake	18 May 1965
1	7	Ding-Dong Bell	25 May 1965
1	8	Flight to Calais	1 June 1965
1	9	A Load of Bilge Water	8 June 1965
1	10	The New People	15 June 1965
1	11	Skinny	22 June 1965
1	12	A Code for Life	29 June 1965
1	13	The Gold-Plated Football	6 July 1965
2	1	A Slight Case of Pilfering: A Packet Full of Trouble	5 April 1966
2	2	A Slight Case of Pilfering: A Man Called Burton	12 April 1966
2	3	A Slight Case of Pilfering: The Achilles Heel	19 April 1966
2	4	A Slight Case of Pilfering: Check	26 April 1966
2	5	A Slight Case of Pilfering: The Cookie Begins to Crumble	10 May 1966
2	6	A Slight Case of Pilfering: Rainbow Day	17 May 1966
2	7	A Slight Case of Pilfering: Follow the Leader	24 May 1966
2	8	Orlando and the Cemetery Walkers: The Cemetery Walkers	31 May 1966
2	9	Orlando and the Cemetery Walkers: A Body in the Basin	7 June 1966
2	10	Orlando and the Cemetery Walkers: The Plot Thickens	14 June 1966
2	11	Orlando and the Cemetery Walkers: Maiden Voyage	21 June 1966
2	12	Orlando and the Cemetery Walkers: Break Out	28 June 1966
2	13	Orlando and the Cemetery Walkers: The Tables Turned	5 July 1966
2	14	Orlando and the Gizzmo’s Revenge: High Jinks and Old Junk	12 July 1966
2	15	Orlando and the Gizzmo’s Revenge: Royalty Moves In	19 July 1966
2	16	Orlando and the Gizzmo’s Revenge: Lady in Waiting	26 July 1966
2	17	Orlando and the Gizzmo’s Revenge: Corpse Diplomatic	2 August 1966
2	18	Orlando and the Gizzmo’s Revenge: Sink or Swim	9 August 1966
2	19	Now You See It - Now You Don’t: That Was No Lady - That Was the Man from M.I.N.C.E.	16 August 1966
2	20	Now You See It - Now You Don’t: Shuffle the Pack and up Pops the Joker	23 August 1966
2	21	Now You See It - Now You Don’t: A Funny Thing Happened to Me on My Way to Prison	30 August 1966
2	22	Now You See It - Now You Don’t: And for My Next Trick	6 September 1966
2	23	Now You See It - Now You Don’t: The Spies That Went Into the Cold	13 September 1966
2	24	Now You See It - Now You Don’t: Don’t Go Down the Mine Chaps, It’s Bursting at the Seams	20 September 1966
2	29	Orlando and the Dangerous Waters: Find the Lady	25 October 1966
2	30	Orlando and the Dangerous Waters: All in the Book	1 November 1966
2	31	Orlando and a Man Called Moosh: Has Anyone Seen Fred Kebah	8 November 1966
2	32	Orlando and a Man Called Moosh: Come with Me to the Casbah	15 November 1966
2	33	Orlando and a Man Called Moosh: A Man Called Moosh	22 November 1966
2	34	Orlando and a Man Called Moosh: Only a Camel Loves a Camel	29 November 1966
2	35	Orlando and a Man Called Moosh: Hubble, Bubble, Double Trouble	6 December 1966
2	36	Stealers Keepers: Storm Warning	13 December 1966
2	37	Stealers Keepers: Wake up Screaming	20 December 1966
2	38	Stealers Keepers: A Peeping Tom and a Shoe	27 December 1966
2	39	Stealers Keepers: Assassin Airborne	3 January 1967
2	40	Stealers Keepers: In at the Death	10 January 1967
3	1	Orlando and the Frightened Clown: Beginners Please	17 January 1967
3	2	Orlando and the Frightened Clown: The Show Must Go On	24 January 1967
3	3	Orlando and the Frightened Clown: Clown on a Bike	31 January 1967
3	4	Orlando and the Frightened Clown: An Apple a Day…	7 February 1967
3	5	Orlando and the Frightened Clown: Send for Fred Pinwad	14 February 1967
3	6	Orlando and the Frightened Clown: Curtain Up	21 February 1967
3	7	Orlando and the Irish Stew: A Tune in the Night	28 February 1967
3	8	Orlando and the Irish Stew: The Stew Thickens	7 March 1967
3	9	Orlando and the Irish Stew: Masks Over Masks	14 March 1967
3	10	Orlando and the Irish Stew: A Bit of a Dance	21 March 1967
3	11	Orlando and the Irish Stew: Pincer Movement	27 March 1967
4	1	Orlando and the Return of Moosh: Beau Geste and All That	25 March 1968
4	2	Orlando and the Return of Moosh: When Did You Last See Your Father?	1 April 1968
4	3	Orlando and the Return of Moosh: Don’t Look Now, There’s a Djellebah Behind You	8 April 1968
4	4	Orlando and the Return of Moosh: Where Was Moosh When the Lights Went Out?	15 April 1968
4	5	Orlando and the Up the Jungle Affair: Lady Tapwater Turns It On	26 April 1968
4	6	Orlando and the Up the Jungle Affair: Who’s Afraid of Piranha Fish?	3 May 1968
4	7	Orlando and the Up the Jungle Affair: Me Tarzan - Up a Gum Tree	10 May 1968
4	8	Orlando and the Up the Jungle Affair: Let’s All Be Hairy Together	17 May 1968
4	9	Orlando and the Fifi Affair: Ou est Fifi Le Bon Bon?	24 May 1968
4	10	Orlando and the Fifi Affair: Aimez-Vous Serge Trowzerzoff?	30 May 1968
4	11	Orlando and the Fifi Affair: Comment Allez Are You Up?	7 June 1968
4	12	Orlando and the Fifi Affair: Au Revoir but Not Goodbye	14 June 1968

=== Riviera Police ===
Of the 13 episodes made, 8 are missing.

Series	Episode No.	Episode Title	Original Broadcast Date
1	2	That Kind of Girl	9 August 1965
1	6	A Shot in the Dark… And Two in the Midday Sun	6 September 1965
1	8	There Comes a Point	20 September 1965
1	9	Past Indefinite - Future Imperfect	27 September 1965
1	10	There’s Something Moving in the Water	5 October 1965
1	11	Girl on a Plate	12 October 1965
1	12	Bubbles Through a Looking Glass	19 October 1965
1	13	A Rainbow Has Two Ends	26 October 1965

=== Sara and Hoppity ===
Out of 52 episodes produced for the 1962-1963 series, 1 official episode exists in its entirety, as does the unaired pilot.

=== Smugglers' Cove ===
All 6 episodes are missing.

== ATV (ITV) ==
=== Call Oxbridge 2000 ===
22 episodes are missing out of the total of 23 episodes. The surviving episode is Episode 1 of the first series, which was released as part of the Soap Box: Volume 1 DVD.

Series	Episode No.	Episode Title	Original Broadcast Date
1	2	Episode 2	1 October 1961
1	3	Episode 3	8 October 1961
1	4	Episode 4	15 October 1961
1	5	Episode 5	22 October 1961
1	6	Episode 6	29 October 1961
1	7	Episode 7	5 November 1961
1	8	Episode 8	12 November 1961
1	9	Episode 9	19 November 1961
2	1	Episode 1	30 September 1962
2	2	Episode 2	7 October 1962
2	3	Episode 3	14 October 1962
2	4	Episode 4	21 October 1962
2	5	Episode 5	28 October 1962
2	6	Episode 6	4 November 1962
2	7	Episode 7	11 November 1962
2	8	Episode 8	18 November 1962
2	9	Episode 9	25 November 1962
2	10	Episode 10	2 December 1962
2	11	Episode 11	9 December 1962
2	12	Episode 12	16 December 1962
2	13	Episode 13	23 December 1962
2	14	Episode 14	30 December 1962

=== The Cliff Richard Show ===
Episode Title	Original Broadcast Date	Notes
Episode dated 17 May 1969	17 May 1969	Guests - Cilla Black, Una Stubbs, Sheila White, Hank B. Marvin, Audrey Bayley, Wendy Gotelee, Celia Hetherington, Domini Winter, The Breakaways, Norrie Paramour and his Orchestra.
Episode dated 31 August 1970	31 August 1970	Guests - Una Stubbs, Hank B. Marvin, Aretha Franklin, The Breakaways, Norrie Paramour and his Orchestra. Exists on 16mm b&w film, but the television programme was originally on 2" colour videotape.
Episode dated 24 December 1970	24 December 1970	Guests - Olivia Newton-John, Marvin, Welch and Farrar, Una Stubbs, Hank Marvin, Norrie Paramour and his Orchestra, The Breakaways.

=== Crossroads ===
Out of 4,522 episodes, 2,854 episodes are missing and 2 other episodes exist on formats of lower quality than the original.

=== Emergency Ward 10 ===
Out of 1,139 episodes, 912 episodes are missing.

=== Fly Into Danger ===
All 7 episodes survive but only episodes 3, 5 and 7 exist on 2” colour videotape, episodes 1, 2, 4 and 6 exist as 16mm black and white film prints.

=== General Hospital ===
Out of 340 episodes, 232 episodes are missing.

=== The Golden Shot ===
Out of 366 episodes, 337 episodes are missing, 4 episodes are incomplete and 18 other episodes exist on formats of lower quality than the original.

=== Little Big Time ===
Out of the 52 episodes, only 1 episode is believed to exist from this 1968 children series, although the surviving episode isn’t fully available to the public, with only around 7-8 minutes of the episode being available to watch. A full list can be seen here

=== Lunch Box ===
Out of 1,334 episodes, none exist as originally broadcast. Being a live magazine show the majority would not have been recorded in the first place. A collection of telerecorded sequences from the programme were retained. A full list can be seen here

=== Market in Honey Lane ===
Series	Episode No.	Episode Title	Original Broadcast Date
2	1	The Initiation	28 December 1967
2	2	The Lost Leader	4 January 1968
2	3	Reasons Of State	11 January 1968
2	4	The Flower Game	18 January 1968
2	5	Third Party Risk	25 January 1968
2	6	The Matchmakers	1 February 1968
2	7	Cabbage	8 February 1968
2	8	Just Good Friends	15 February 1968
2	9	The Organisers	22 February 1968
2	10	Some Of My Best Friends Are ------s!	29 February 1968
2	11	Take A Pair Of Sparkling Eyes	7 March 1968
2	12	It's A Free Country, Isn't It?	14 March 1968
2	13	Balance Of Payment	21 March 1968

=== Meet Peters and Lee ===
Series	Episode No.	Episode Title	Original Broadcast Date
1	1	Episode 1	25 December 1974

=== New Faces ===
Out of 166 episodes, 128 episodes are missing.

=== Pipkins ===
Out of 333 episodes, 197 episodes are missing, 2 episodes are incomplete, and 56 episodes exist on formats of lower quality tapes than the original ones.

=== Saturday Variety ===
Although there are no episodes missing, 1 episode is only available on 16mm black-and-white film, having been recorded on 2" colour videotape. As the film print have Chroma dots visible, it will be possible in the future for the film to undergo Colour recovery.

Series	Episode No.	Episode Title	Original Broadcast Date
1	2	Episode 2	29 January 1972

=== Stryker of the Yard ===
Series	Episode No.	Episode Title	Original Broadcast Date
1	2	The Case Of Uncle Henry	7 December 1961

=== Sunday Night at the London Palladium ===
Out of 389 episodes, 378 episodes are missing, and a further episode is incomplete.

=== Thingumybob ===
7 out of the 8 episodes of this 1968 series are lost.

=== Timeslip ===
Although none of the 26 episodes are missing or incomplete, 19 episodes exist only on 16mm black-and-white film and it was originally recorded on 2" colour videotape. As many of the film prints have Chroma dots visible, it will be possible in the future for the films to undergo Colour recovery.

Series	Episode No.	Episode Title	Original Broadcast Date
1	1	Episode 1	28 September 1970
1	2	Episode 2	5 October 1970
1	3	Episode 3	12 October 1970
1	4	Episode 4	19 October 1970
1	5	Episode 5	26 October 1970
1	6	Episode 6	2 November 1970
2	1	Episode 1	9 November 1970
2	2	Episode 2	16 November 1970
2	3	Episode 3	23 November 1970
2	4	Episode 4	30 November 1970
2	5	Episode 5	7 December 1970
3	1	Episode 1	21 December 1970
3	2	Episode 2	28 December 1970
3	3	Episode 3	4 January 1971
3	4	Episode 4	11 January 1971
3	5	Episode 5	18 January 1971
3	6	Episode 6	25 January 1971
3	7	Episode 7	1 February 1971
3	8	Episode 8	8 February 1971

=== Tiswas ===
Out of 302 episodes, the exact number of episodes are missing is unclear, although it is believed that 22 episodes do exist in their entirety.

=== Two of a Kind ===
Out of 68 episodes, 18 episodes are missing.

Series	Episode No.	Episode Title	Original Broadcast Date	Notes
1	1	Episode 1	12 October 1961	Guests - Jack Parnell and his Orchestra.
1	2	Episode 2	19 October 1961	Guests - Jack Parnell and his Orchestra, The Confederates.
1	3	Episode 3	26 October 1961	Guests - Jack Parnell and his Orchestra, Acker Bilk.
1	4	Episode 4	2 November 1961	Guests - Jack Parnell and his Orchestra, The McGuire Sisters.
1	5	Episode 5	9 November 1961	Guests - Jack Parnell and his Orchestra, The Peters Sisters.
1	6	Episode 6	16 November 1961	Guests - Jack Parnell and his Orchestra, Cleo Laine.
1	7	Episode 7	23 November 1961	Guests - Jack Parnell and his Orchestra, Gary Miller, Monty Sunshine's Jazz Band.
1	8	Episode 8	30 November 1961	Guests - Jack Parnell and his Orchestra, Micky Ashman's Ragtime Jazz Band, Valerie Masters.
1	9	Episode 9	7 November 1961	Guests - Jack Parnell and his Orchestra, The Kaye Sisters, Alex Welsh and his Band.
6	1	Episode 1	Unknown date	Guests - Millicent Martin, The Kinks, Engelbert Humperdinck.
6	2	Episode 2	12 November 1967	Guests - Millicent Martin, The Hollies, Tom Jones, Diana Williams, Eddie Mulloy, The Paddy Stone Dancers, The Mike Sammes Singers, Jack Parnell and his Orchestra.
6	3	Episode 3	10 December 1967	Guests - Millicent Martin, Manfred Mann, George Maharis, Jill Curzon, Margaret Nolan, Freddy Powell, Mike Briton, Diana Williams, Roger Jacombs, The Paddy Stone Dancers.
6	4	Episode 4	31 December 1967	Guests - Millicent Martin, The New Vaudeville Band, Frankie Avalon, Janet Webb, Diana Williams, Jenny Lee-Wright, Valerie Stanton, Sally Douglas, The Paddy Stone Dancers, The Mike Sammes Singers.
6	5	Episode 5	14 January 1968	Guests - Millicent Martin, The Moody Blues, Tommy Leonetti, Jenny Lee-Wright, Daphne Odin-Pearse, Jackie Poole, Roger Jacombs, Mike Briton, The Paddy Stone Dancers, The Mike Sammes Singers.
6	6	Episode 6	4 February 1968	Guests - Millicent Martin, The Tremeloes, Peter Nero, Wanda Ventham, Sheila Bernette, Joe Chusatis, Gene Cherico, Jenny Lee-Wright, The Paddy Stone Dancers, Jack Parnell and his Orchestra.
6	7	Episode 7	25 February 1968	Guests - Millicent Martin, Eric Burdon and the Animals, Gene Pitney, Gladys Whitred, Dinny Powell, Jenny Lee-Wright, Sally Douglas, Jackie Poole, Jonathan Barrett, The Paddy Stone Dancers.
6	8	Episode 8	17 March 1968	Guests - Millicent Martin, Georgie Fame and the Fame Group, Bobby Vinton, Diana Williams, Jimmy Lee, Mike Briton, Roger Jacombs, The Paddy Stone Dancers, The Mike Sammes Singers, Jack Parnell and his Orchestra.
6	9	Episode 9	March 1968	Guests - Millicent Martin, The Dave Clark Five, Cliff Richard.

== ABC Weekend Television (ITV) ==
=== Armchair Mystery Theatre ===
25 out of 34 episodes are missing.

=== Armchair Theatre ===
258 Episodes are missing from the first 14 series, episodes from series 15 onwards exist.

=== The Avengers ===
The first series is missing 22 out of 26 episodes, leaving only episodes 6, 15 and 20 surviving as well as act 1 of episode 1. All episodes from series 2 onwards exist.

=== Callan ===
Of the 21 episodes made for the first 2 series, 10 are missing, 1 episode has surviving audio. All episodes from series 3 onwards exist. 1 surviving episode from series 2 exists as a complete recording block and was re-edited as close as possible to its original transmission.

Series	Episode No.	Episode Title	Original Broadcast Date	Notes
1	2	Goodbye, Nobby Clarke	15 July 1967	
1	3	The Death of Robert E. Lee	22 July 1967	
1	4	Goodness Burns Too Bright	29 July 1967	
1	5	But He’s a Lord, Mr Callan	5 August 1967	
2	3	You’re Under Starter’s Orders	22 January 1969	
2	7	Land of Light and Peace	19 February 1969	
2	8	Blackmailers Should Be Discouraged	26 February 1969	
2	10	Jack-On-Top	12 March 1969	
2	11	Once a Big Man, Always a Big Man	19 March 1969	Audio
2	12	The Running Dog	26 March 1969	

=== Emerald Soup ===
All 7 episodes are missing.

=== Mystery and Imagination ===
Of the 18 episodes made for the first 3 series, only 2 exist. Sequences exist for 1 episode and audio exists for 6 episodes. All episodes from series 4 onwards exist.

=== Our House ===
Out of 39 episodes, only 3 have survived.

=== Out of This World ===
Out of 13 episodes made, 12 are missing and only 1 survives, 2 missing episodes have audio recordings.

=== Plateau of Fear ===
All 6 episodes are missing.

=== Police Surgeon ===
Out of the 13 episodes made only episode 1 survives, the rest are missing.

=== Public Eye ===
Of the 41 episodes made for the first 3 series, 36 are missing, 1 has surviving sequences and 5 have surviving audio. All episodes from series 4 onwards exist.

=== Redcap ===
Out of 26 episodes, 2 are missing and 1 is incomplete.

=== Target Luna ===
All 6 episodes are missing.

== Granada Television (ITV) ==
=== The Army Game ===
Of the 156 episodes made 50 survive.

=== Bootsie and Snudge ===
Of the 104 episodes made only 4 are missing.

=== Bulldog Breed ===
All 7 episodes are missing.

=== The Dustbinmen ===
All 20 episodes exist but 5 episodes from series 2 survive as black and white 16mm telerecordings and the first 2 episodes of series 3 survive as U-matic tape.

=== Kipps ===
All 8 episodes are missing.

=== Knight Errant Limited ===
Of the 75 episodes made only 2 survive.

=== Mess Mates ===
Of the 40 episodes made only 1 survives.

=== It’s Dark Outside ===
Of the 16 episodes made, 6 (all from series 2) are missing.

Series	Episode No.	Episode Title	Original Broadcast Date
2	2	Specimens Walk on Their Hind Legs Too	5 March 1965
2	3	Arrangements in Black and White	12 March 1965
2	4	A Dream of Magic - A Greed of Money	19 March 1965
2	6	The Party	2 April 1965
2	7	The Prevalence of Liars	9 April 1965
2	8	The Gatling’s Jammed and the Colonel’s Dead	23 April 1965

=== Shadow Squad ===
Of the 179 episodes made only 4 survive.

=== Skyport ===
Of the 52 made only 1 survives.

=== Turn Out the Lights ===
All 6 episodes are missing.

== Scottish Television (STV) ==
=== Garnock Way ===
Out of 173 episodes made, only 4 (Episodes 1 and 129-131) survive.

== Southern Television (ITV) ==
=== Bright’s Boffins ===
All 39 episodes are missing.

=== Danger Island ===
All 6 episodes exist incomplete.

=== Follow That Dog ===
All 6 episodes are missing.

=== Freewheelers ===
Out of the 104 episodes made, 51 episodes are missing, 12 episodes (1 from series 7 and 11 from series 8) exist on domestic video formats, 16mm film inserts exits for all or at least the majority of Episodes.

Series	Episode No.	Episode Title	Original Broadcast Date
2	1	The Zander Plot: Breakout	20 November 1968
2	2	The Zander Plot: Treasure	27 November 1968
2	3	The Zander Plot: Master Plan	4 December 1968
2	4	The Zander Plot: The Code	11 December 1968
2	5	The Zander Plot: The Lighthouse	18 December 1968
2	6	The Zander Plot: The Stones	25 December 1968
2	7	The Zander Plot: Time Bomb!	1 January 1968
2	9	The Secret Base: The Key	15 January 1969
2	10	The Secret Base: Black Knight	22 January 1969
2	11	The Secret Base: Vulcan	29 January 1969
2	12	The Secret Base: Double Trouble	5 February 1969
2	13	The Secret Base: Damocles!	12 February 1969
3	1	Rammed	9 July 1969
3	2	The Banchee	16 July 1969
3	3	Minded	23 July 1969
3	4	Trapped	30 July 1969
3	5	Tanks!	6 August 1969
3	6	Caged!	13 August 1969
3	7	The Tower	20 August 1969
3	8	Triton	27 August 1969
3	9	Kidnapped	3 September 1969
3	10	The Voyage	10 September 1969
3	11	The Island	17 September 1969
3	12	Blockade	24 September 1969
3	13	Thunderbolt!	1 October 1969
4	1	Not In Jest	29 April 1970
4	2	A Thing Like Death	6 May 1970
4	3	Package Deal	13 May 1970
4	4	Spartika	20 May 1970
4	5	Merely Players	27 May 1970
4	6	Agincourt	3 June 1970
4	7	Microdot	10 June 1970
4	8	Kythera!	17 June 1970
4	9	The Dictator	24 June 1970
4	10	Petrov	1 July 1970
4	11	Decoy	8 July 1970
4	12	Firing Squad	15 July 1970
4	13	Explosion	22 July 1970
5	1	Sniper!	20 January 1971
5	2	Spin Off	27 January 1971
5	3	The Mill	3 February 1971
5	4	Blackmail	10 February 1971
5	5	Zukov	17 February 1971
5	6	Russian Roulette	24 February 1971
5	7	Destruct	3 March 1971
5	8	Zyton!	10 March 1971
5	9	Entombed	17 March 1971
5	10	Roll Up	24 March 1971
5	11	Booby Trap	31 March 1971
5	12	Pipeline	7 April 1971
5	13	The Answer	14 April 1971

=== Letters from the Dead ===
Out of the 6 episodes made only episodes 4 and 6 survive, sequences exist for the first 3 episodes.

=== The Master ===
All 6 episodes are missing.

=== Mystery Hall ===
All 6 episodes exist incomplete.

=== The New Forest Rustlers ===
All 6 episodes are missing.

=== Together ===
Out of the 53 episodes made only 2 are missing along with the untransmitted pilot.

== Tyne Tees Television (ITV) ==
=== Life With Johnny ===
3 out of 6 episodes are missing.

== Anglia Television (ITV) ==
=== Weavers Green ===
Only the 2 untransmitted pilots are missing.

== HTV (ITV) ==
=== The Georgian House ===
Out of the 7 episodes made only episodes 1, 3 and 7 survive with episode 3 surviving as an off air video recordings.

=== King of the Castle ===
All 7 episodes exist but episode 3 survives on VHS.

=== SKY ===
All 7 episodes exist but episodes 3 and 7 survive on VHS.

== YTV (ITV) ==
=== Castle Haven ===
All 100 episodes are missing.

=== Inside George Webley ===
All episodes from series 1 are missing, all episodes from series 2 survive.

=== Sez Les ===
All episodes from the first 2 series are missing. All episodes from series 3 onwards exist.

== Thames Television (ITV) ==
=== Ace of Wands ===
All episodes from the first 2 series are missing except for sequences from series 1, episode 3, domestic audio recording for 9 episodes from series 2 also exist. All episodes from series 3 survive.

Series	Episode No,	Episode Title	Original Broadcast Date	Notes
1	1	One and One and One are Four: Part 1	29 July 1970	
1	2	One and One and One are Four: Part 2	5 August 1970	
1	3	One and One and One are Four: Part 3	12 August 1970	Sequences
1	4	The Mind Robbers: Part 1	19 August 1970	
1	5	The Mind Robbers: Part 2	26 August 1970	
1	6	The Mind Robbers: Part 3	2 September 1970	
1	7	The Mind Robbers: Part 4	9 September 1970	
1	8	Now You See It, Now You Don’t: Part 1	16 September 1970	
1	9	Now You See It, Now You Don’t: Part 2	23 September 1970	
1	10	The Smile: Part 1	30 September 1970	
1	11	The Smile: Part 2	7 October 1970	
1	12	The Smile: Part 3	14 October 1970	
1	13	The Smile: Part 4	21 October 1970	
2	1	Seven Serpents, Sulphur and Salt: Part 1	21 July 1971	Audio
2	2	Seven Serpents, Sulphur and Salt: Part 2	28 July 1971	Audio
2	3	Seven Serpents, Sulphur and Salt: Part 3	4 August 1971	Audio
2	4	Joker: Part 1	11 August 1971	
2	5	Joker: Part 2	18 August 1971	
2	6	Joker: Part 3	25 August 1971	
2	7	Nightmare Gas: Part 1	1 September 1971	Audio
2	8	Nightmare Gas: Part 2	8 September 1971	Audio
2	9	Nightmare Gas: Part 3	15 September 1971	Audio
2	10	The Eye of Ra: Part 1	22 September 1971	
2	11	The Eye of Ra: Part 2	29 September 1971	Audio
2	12	The Eye of Ra: Part 3	6 October 1971	Audio
2	13	The Eye of Ra: Part 4	13 October 1971	Audio

=== Best of Enemies ===
All 5 episodes are missing.

=== The Incredible Adventures of Professor Branestawm ===
All 7 episodes are missing.

=== The Queen Street Gang ===
All 9 episodes are missing.

=== The Tingaree Affair ===
All 7 episodes are missing.

=== Tottering Towers ===
All 13 episodes are missing.

== LWT (ITV) ==
=== The Adventures of Don Quick ===
Out of the 6 episodes made, 5 are missing.

=== We Have Ways of Making You Laugh ===
All 12 episodes are missing, 2 episodes have surviving audio.

=== Within These Walls ===
Only episode 3 of series 2 is missing.

== TVS (ITV) ==
=== The Boy Who Won the Pools ===
Out of the 10 episodes made, 9 exist as off air video recordings.

=== The Brief ===
All 13 episodes exist as off air video recordings

=== C.A.T.S. Eyes ===
Out of the 30 episodes made, 18 exist as off air video recordings, 8 from series 1, 7 from series 2 and 3 from series 3.

=== The Haunting of Cassie Palmer ===
All 6 episodes exist as off air video recordings.

=== Knights of God ===
Of the 13 episodes made, 8 exist as off air video recordings.

=== Letty ===
All 6 episodes exist as off air video recordings.

=== Travellers by Night ===
Out of the 6 episodes made, 5 exist as off air video recordings.

=== The Witches and the Grinnygog ===
All 6 episodes exist as off air video recordings.

== BBC ==
=== 199 Park Lane ===
Out of 18 episodes, all episodes are missing.

Series	Episode No.	Episode Title	Original Broadcast Date
1	1	The New Tenant	3 August 1965
1	2	Decision	6 August 1965
1	3		10 August 1965
1	4		13 August 1965
1	5		17 August 1965
1	6		20 August 1965
1	7		24 August 1965
1	8		27 August 1965
1	9		31 August 1965
1	10		3 September 1965
1	11		7 September 1965
1	12		10 September 1965
1	13		14 September 1965
1	14		17 September 1965
1	15		21 September 1965
1	16		24 September 1965
1	17		28 September 1965
1	18		1 October 1965

=== A for Andromeda ===
Out of 7 episodes, 4 episodes are missing and 2 episodes are incomplete.

Series	Episode No.	Episode Title	Original Broadcast Date
1	1	The Message	3 October 1961
1	2	The Machine	10 October 1961
1	3	The Miracle	17 October 1961
1	4	The Monster	24 October 1961
1	5	The Murderer	31 October 1961
1	7	The Last Mystery	14 November 1961

=== Abigail and Roger ===
All 9 episodes are missing.

Series	Episode No.	Episode Title	Original Broadcast Date
1	1	Episode One	4 July 1956
1	2	Episode Two	11 July 1956
1	3	Episode Three	18 July 1956
1	4	Episode Four	25 July 1956
1	5	Episode Five	1 August 1956
1	6	Episode Six	8 August 1956
1	7	Episode Seven	15 August 1956
1	8	Episode Eight	22 August 1956
1	9	Episode Nine	29 August 1956

=== Adam Adamant Lives! ===
Out of 29 episodes, 12 episodes are missing and 1 episode only exists in 16mm black-and-white film and it was originally telerecorded on 35mm black-and-white film.

Series	Episode No.	Episode Title	Original Broadcast Date
0	Pilot (unbroadcast)	Adam Adamant Lives	Not aired
1	14	Ticket To Terror	29 September 1966
2	1	A Slight Case Of Reincarnation	31 December 1966
2	3	Conspiracy Of Death	14 January 1967
2	4	The Basardi Affair	21 January 1967
2	5	The Survivors	28 January 1967
2	6	Face In A Mirror	4 February 1967
2	7	Another Little Drink	11 February 1967
2	8	Death Begins At Seventy	18 February 1967
2	9	Tunnel Of Death	25 February 1967
2	10	The Deadly Bullet	4 March 1967
2	11	The Resurrectionists	11 March 1967
2	12	Wish You Were Here	18 March 1967

=== Adventure Weekly ===
Out of the 13 episodes made, 8 are missing and only 5 survive. The untransmitted pilot also survives.

Series	Episode No.	Episode Title	Original Broadcast Date
1	3	Explosion	13 January 1969
1	4	Take-Over: Part 1	20 January 1969
1	5	Take-Over: Part 2	27 January 1969
1	6	Take-Over: Part 3	3 February 1969
1	8	The Dig: Part 1	17 February 1969
1	9	The Dig: Part 2	24 February 1969
1	10	The Dig: Part 3	3 March 1969
1	11	Double Bluff	10 March 1969

=== Bachelor Father ===
Out of 22 episodes, 10 episodes are missing and 11 episodes exist only on 16mm black-and-white film and it was originally recorded on 2" colour videotape.

Series	Episode No.	Episode Title	Original Broadcast Date
1	4	The Normal Front	8 October 1970
1	5	Birthday Boys	15 October 1970
1	6	The Peter Pan Syndrome	22 October 1970
1	7	A Little Learning	29 October 1970
1	8	A Spot Of Natural Expression	5 November 1970
1	9	A Man's Man About The House	12 November 1970
1	10	A Kind Of Love	19 November 1970
1	11	Time To Go Home	26 November 1970
1	12	Love Thy Neighbour	3 December 1970
1	13	Feminine Company	10 December 1970

=== Barlow at Large ===
Out of the 29 episodes made, 5 are missing and 7 survive as black and white 16mm telerecordings.

Series	Episode No.	Episode Title	Original Broadcast Date
4	1	Vindication	8 January 1975
4	3	Bullion	22 January 1975
4	4	Rat Run	29 January 1975
4	6	Contessa	12 February 1975
4	7	Nemesis	19 February 1975

=== The Borderers ===
Out of 26 episodes 11 are missing. 8 of the 15 surviving episodes exists in black and white when originally made in colour.

Series	Episode No.	Episode Title	Original Broadcast Date
1	7	"Hero"	11 February 1969
1	9	"Giant"	25 March 1969
1	10	"Wedlock"	4 March 1969
2	4	"What a Vengeance Upon England"	27 January 1970
2	5	"Among The Eagles"	3 February 1970
2	6	"Plot Counterplot"	10 February 1970
2	7	"The Quacksalver"	17 February 1970
2	8	"To The Gallows Tree"	24 February 1970
2	9	"A Woman or an Epitaph"	3 March 1970
2	10	"Hostage"	10 March 1970
2	12	"The Terror of the March"	24 March 1970

=== Christmas Night with the Stars ===
Out of 105 mini episodes, 71 mini episodes are missing and further episode is incomplete. Christmas Night with the Stars showed short seasonal editions of popular shows.

Edition	Broadcast	Missing mini episodes
1959	25 December 1959	Ken Mackintosh And His Orchestra, Jimmy Logan, David Hughes, Charlie Drake, Jack Warner, Joan Regan, Jimmy Edwards, The Black And White Minstrels.
1960	25 December 1960	The Black And White Minstrels, Sid James, Nina And Frederick, Harry Worth, Kenneth McKellar, David Nixon And Robert Harbin, Stanley Baxter And Betty Marsden, Joan Regan, Jimmy Edwards.
1962	25 December 1962	The Billy Cotton Band Show, The Rag Trade, A Song For Everyone, Sykes And His Sister, Adam Faith, Raise Your Glasses, Juke Box Jury: Hugh And I Versus Citizen James, It's A Square World, Russ's Requests, The Christmas Face Of Jim, The White Heather Club, Steptoe And Son, The Black And White Minstrels, Dixon Of Dock Green.
1963	25 December 1963	The Black And White Minstrels, Russ Conway, Billy Cotton And His Band, Dixon Of Dock Green, Dick Emery And Joan Sims, Hugh And I, It's A Square World, Juke Box Jury, The Marriage Lines, Kenneth McKellar, Nina And Frederik, Andy Stewart.
1967	25 December 1967	Till Death Us Do Part, Beggar My Neighbour, The Illustrated Weekly Hudd, Harry Worth, Steptoe And Son (sequences exist, but are incomplete).
1968	25 December 1968	Presentation, Not In Front Of The Children, Dad's Army, Harry Worth, Ice Cabaret, Marty Feldman Sings A Song Of Christmas, Oh Brother! All Gas And Gaiters.
1969	25 December 1969	Presentation, Marty, Kenneth McKellar And Moira Anderson, Not In Front Of The Children.
1970	25 December 1970	Presentation, Dad's Army, Stanley Baxter, Dick Emery, Bachelor Father, Terry Scott And June Whitfield.
1971	25 December 1971	Presentation, Till Death Us Do Part, Bachelor Father, Dick Emery, A Policeman's Lot, Look Mike Yarwood, The Young Generation.

=== Citizen James ===
Out of 32 episodes, 21 are missing and 11 survive.

=== Compact ===
Out of 373 Episodes, only 4 have survived.

=== Cluff ===
The pilot episode and all episodes of series 1 are missing, all episodes from series 2 survive but 11 episodes survive on 16mm film when they were originally telerecorded onto 35mm film.

=== Codename ===
All 13 episodes are missing.

=== Dad's Army ===
Series no.	Episode no.	Title	Broadcast	Notes
2	3	The Loneliness of the Long Distance Walker	15 March 1969	Both video and soundtrack still missing. Radio version survives.
2	5	A Stripe for Frazer	29 March 1969	Soundtrack found in 2008, video still missing. Radio version survives.
2	6	Under Fire	5 April 1969	Both video and soundtrack still missing. Radio version survives.

In addition, the 16 October 1969 episode Room at the Bottom only survived on 16mm black-and-white film and it was originally recorded on 2" colour videotape. In 2008, the film underwent the Chroma dot colour recovery and was broadcast in colour for the first time in almost forty years on 13 December 2008.

2 of the 4 Christmas sketches of Dad's Army (broadcast as part of Christmas Night with the Stars between 1968 and 1972) survive only as off-air soundtrack recordings:

- "Present Arms" (1968) - soundtrack found in 2008, picture still missing.
- "The Cornish Floral Dance" - soundtrack found (can be heard on the DVD boxset), picture still missing.

=== Dixon of Dock Green ===
Out of 432 episodes, 380 episodes are missing and 19 episodes are incomplete. 5 episodes have audio recordings and 1 episode has picture but no audio.

=== Doctor Who ===
Doctor	Season	Story No.	Serial	Lost Episodes	Tally
First Doctor	1	004	Marco Polo	All 7 episodes	7
First Doctor	1	008	The Reign of Terror	Episodes 4 & 5 (of 6 total)	2
First Doctor	2	014	The Crusade	Episodes 2 & 4 (of 4 total)	2
First Doctor	3	018	Galaxy 4	Episodes 1, 2 & 4 (of 4 total)	3
First Doctor	3	019	Mission to the Unknown	Entire episode	1
First Doctor	3	020	The Myth Makers	All 4 episodes	4
First Doctor	3	021	The Daleks' Master Plan	Episodes, 4, 6-9, 11 & 12 (of 12 total)	7
First Doctor	3	022	The Massacre of St Bartholomew's Eve	All 4 episodes	4
First Doctor	3	024	The Celestial Toymaker	Episodes 1, 2 & 3 (of 4 total)	3
First Doctor	3	026	The Savages	All 4 episodes	4
First Doctor	4	028	The Smugglers	All 4 episodes	4
First Doctor	4	029	The Tenth Planet	Episode 4 (of 4 total)	1
First Doctor Totals			12 serials	42 episodes	
Second Doctor	4	030	The Power of the Daleks	All 6 episodes	6
Second Doctor	4	031	The Highlanders	All 4 episodes	4
Second Doctor	4	032	The Underwater Menace	Episodes 1 & 4 (of 4 total)	2
Second Doctor	4	033	The Moonbase	Episodes 1 & 3 (of 4 total)	2
Second Doctor	4	034	The Macra Terror	All 4 episodes	4
Second Doctor	4	035	The Faceless Ones	Episodes 2, 4-6 (of 6 total)	4
Second Doctor	4	036	The Evil of the Daleks	Episodes 1, 3-7 (of 7 total)	6
Second Doctor	5	038	The Abominable Snowmen	Episodes 1, 3-6 (of 6 total)	5
Second Doctor	5	039	The Ice Warriors	Episodes 2 & 3 (of 6 total)	2
Second Doctor	5	041	The Web of Fear	Episode 3 (of 6 total)	1
Second Doctor	5	042	Fury from the Deep	All 6 episodes	6
Second Doctor	5	043	The Wheel in Space	Episodes 1, 2, 4 & 5 (of 6 total)	4
Second Doctor	6	046	The Invasion	Episodes 1 & 4 (of 8 total)	2
Second Doctor	6	049	The Space Pirates	Episodes 1, 3-6 (of 6 total)	5
Second Doctor Totals			14 serials	53 episodes	
Totals			26 serials	95 episodes	

Audio versions of all missing episodes survive, made during the original broadcasts of the 1960s.

==== Unaired lost episodes ====
In addition to the official list of missing episodes, also missing is the original Episode 1 of The Daleks. At some point after the recording, it was discovered that a technical problem had caused backstage voices to be heard on the resulting videotape; in early December 1963, the episode was remounted with a different costume for Susan. The only surviving portion is the reprise at the beginning of Episode 2.

Planet of Giants is another odd example, having originally recorded four episodes. Directed by Douglas Camfield and entitled "The Urge to Live", Episode 4 was spliced together with the original Episode 3 ("Crisis") to create a faster-paced climax with only Camfield being credited on the resulting episode. This decision, made by then-Head of Drama Sydney Newman, resulted in a gap at the end of the second production block (and the creation of Mission to the Unknown); the unused portions of Episodes 3 and 4 are believed to have been destroyed.

Doctor	Season	Story No.	Serial	Lost Episodes	Tally
First Doctor	1	002	The Daleks (original version)	Episode 1 (remounted; original is missing, minus the reprise at the beginning of Episode 2)	1
First Doctor	2	009	Planet of Giants (original version)	Episodes 3–4 (these two episodes were edited together into a single episode for broadcast; only the original, unaired versions are missing)	2

=== Doomwatch ===
Of the 38 episodes made, 14 are missing. 14 of the 24 surviving episodes survive as NTSC tapes instead of their original PAL tapes.

Series	Episode No.	Episode Title	Original Broadcast Date
1	2	Friday’s Child	16 February 1970
1	3	Burial at Sea	23 February 1970
1	9	Spectre at the Feast	13 April 1970
1	12	Near No Evil	4 May 1970
1	13	Survival Code	11 May 1970
3	1	Fire and Brimstone	5 June 1972
3	2	High Mountain	12 June 1972
3	3	Say Knife, Fat Man	19 June 1972
3	5	Without the Bomb	3 July 1972
3	7	Deadly Dangerous Tomorrow	17 July 1972
3	8	Enquiry	24 July 1972
3	9	Flood	31 July 1972
3	10	Cause of Death	7 August 1972
3	11	The Killer Dolphins	14 August 1970

=== Dr. Finlay's Casebook ===
Out of 191 episodes, 123 are missing and 1 is incomplete, many surviving episodes now exist on 16mm film when they were originally telerecorded onto 35mm film.

=== The Expert ===
14 out of 62 episodes are missing. Out of the 48 surviving episodes, 31 exist in black and white when they were originally made in colour.

Series	Episode No.	Episode Title	Original Broadcast Date
1	1	The Unknown Factor	5 July 1968
1	3	Liars, Damn Liars	19 July 1968
1	4	Miss Daley	26 July 1968
1	5	Nice Day	2 August 1968
1	6	The Long Hate	9 August 1968
1	7	Nobody's Going to Hurt You	16 August 1968
1	8	Here Lies…	23 August 1968
1	9	The Contact	30 August 1968
1	10	He's Good For It	6 September 1968
1	11	Fire Without Smoke	13 September 1968
1	12	Full Choke	20 September 1968
1	13	And So Say All of Us	27 September 1968
2	20	Eddie	15 August 1969
2	26	Sufficiently Loved and Cared For	26 September 1969

=== The Gnomes of Dulwich ===
All 6 episodes are missing.

Series	Episode No.	Episode Title	Original Broadcast Date
1	1	Episode 1	12 May 1969
1	2	Episode 2	19 May 1969
1	3	Episode 3	26 May 1969
1	4	Episode 4	2 June 1969
1	5	Episode 5	9 June 1969
1	6	Episode 6	16 June 1969

=== The Goodies ===
Out of 76 episodes, 1 episode is missing, 2 episodes exist on black & white film.

Series No.	Ep No.	Title	Broadcast	Notes
1	4	Caught in the Act	29 November 1970	Originally recorded on 2" colour videotape, it only exists on 16mm black and white film. This episode is also known as "The Playgirl Club" and as "Compromising Photos".
2	2	Commonwealth Games	8 October 1971	Originally recorded on 2" colour videotape, it only exists on 16mm black and white film. This episode is also known as "Sporting Goodies" and "Goodies of Sport".
2	7	Kitten Kong	12 November 1971	Only missing episode, originally recorded on 2" colour videotape. (This episode was remade in an expanded form.)

=== Hancock's Half Hour ===
Out of 57 episodes, 26 episodes are missing.

Series	Episode No.	Episode Title	Original Broadcast Date
1	1	The First TV Show	6 July 1956
1	2	The Artist	20 July 1956
1	3	The Dancer	3 August 1956
1	4	The Bequest	17 August 1956
1	5	The Radio Show	31 August 1956
1	6	The Chef That Died Of Shame	14 September 1956
2	2	Lady Chatterley's Revenge	15 April 1957
2	3	The Russian Prince	29 April 1957
2	4	The New Neighbour	13 May 1957
2	5	The Pianist	27 May 1957
2	6	The Auction	10 June 1957
3	1	The Continental Holiday	30 September 1957
3	2	The Great Detective	7 October 1957
3	3	The Amusement Arcade	14 October 1957
3	4	A Holiday In Scotland	21 October 1957
3	6	The Regimental Reunion	4 November 1957
3	7	The Adopted Family	11 November 1957
3	8	The Elocution Teacher	25 November 1957
4	2	Underpaid! Or Grandad's SOS	2 January 1959
4	5	The Flight Of The Red Shadow	23 January 1959
4	6	The Horror Serial	30 January 1959
4	7	The Italian Maid	6 February 1959
4	8	Matrimony - Almost	13 February 1959
4	9	The Beauty Contest	20 February 1959
4	10	The Wrong Man	6 March 1959
4	13	The Servants	27 March 1959

=== The Likely Lads ===
Out of 20 episodes, 10 episodes are missing.

Series	Episode No.	Episode Title	Original Broadcast Date	Notes
1	5	Chance Of A Lifetime	13 January 1965	
2	1	Baby It's Cold Outside	16 June 1965	
2	3	The Talk Of The Town	30 June 1965	
2	6	Where Have All The Flowers Gone?	21 July 1965	
3	1	Outward Bound	4 June 1966	Audio exists
3	2	Friends And Neighbours	11 June 1966	
3	4	Brief Encounter	25 June 1966	Audio exists
3	5	The Razor's Edge	2 July 1966	Audio exists
3	6	Anchors Aweigh	9 July 1966	Audio exists
3	7	Love And Marriage	16 July 1966	

=== The Long Way Home ===
Out of the 7 episodes made only episode 2 is missing.

=== Marriage Lines ===
Out of 44 episodes + 2 shorts episodes, the exact number of episodes missing is unclear, as the BBC and Kaleidoscope both have different lists.

=== Marty ===
Out of 12 episodes, 4 episodes are missing (note sometimes series 2 is called "It's Marty")

Series	Episode No.	Episode Title	Original Broadcast Date
1	1	Episode 1	29 April 1968
1	3	Episode 3	13 May 1968
1	4	Episode 4	20 May 1968
1	5	Episode 5	3 June 1968

=== Mistress of Hardwick ===
This ten-part historical drama series from 1972, starring Hilary Mason, is lost.

=== The Morecambe & Wise Show ===
Out of 71 episodes, 3 episodes are missing and 1 episode is incomplete. Off-air soundtracks survive, made during broadcasts in Australia.

Series	Episode No.	Episode Title	Original Broadcast Date	Notes
1	1	Episode 1	2 September 1968	Guests - Georgia Brown, Los Zafiros, Jenny Lee-Wright, Bettine Le Beau, Alyn Ainsworth and his Orchestra.
1	4	Episode 4	23 September 1968	Guests - Bruce Forsyth, Jenny Lee-Wright, Kenny Ball and his Jazzmen, Alyn Ainsworth and his Orchestra.
1	6	Episode 6 (extracts survive)	7 October 1968	Guests - with Edmund Hockridge, Jenny Lee-Wright, Kenny Ball and his Jazzmen, Alyn Ainsworth and his Orchestra.
1	8	Episode 8	21 October 1968	Guests - Matt Monro, Kenny Ball and his Jazzmen, Jenny Lee-Wright, Sandra Fehr, George Fisher, Jane Bartlett, Thelma Bignall, Linda Hotchkin, Johnny Harris and his Orcheqstra.

=== Not in Front of the Children ===
Out of 38 episodes, 30 episodes are missing, 6 black and white episodes exist, 1 colour episode exists and 1 episode originally recorded on 2" colour videotape only exists as a 16mm b&w telerecording.

Series	Episode No.	Episode Title	Original Broadcast Date
1	0 (Pilot)	House In A Tree	26 May 1967
1	1	Just Pack A Toothbrush	25 August 1967
1	2	Survival	1 September 1967
1	4	A Drop Of The Soft Stuff	15 September 1967
1	5	Part Of The Furniture	22 September 1967
1	6	While The Brood's Away	29 September 1967
2	1	Lady With A Screwdriver	23 February 1968
2	3	Sweet Memories	8 February 1968
2	4	Wholly Deadlock	15 March 1968
3	1	Spare Time Job	25 October 1968
3	2	Look For The Crystal Lining	1 November 1968
3	3	Echo Of The Past	8 November 1968
3	4	A Real Family Evening	15 November 1968
3	5	An Older Man's Fancy	22 November 1968
3	6	Baby Talk	29 November 1968
3	1	Feathers For The Nest	12 September 1969
3	2	Old Grey Mare	19 September 1969
3	3	Bundle Of Joy	26 September 1969
3	4	A Babe Around The House	3 October 1969
3	5	A Stand On Ceremony	10 October 1969
3	6	A Slight Case Of Baptism	17 October 1969
3	7	Unemployment Problem	24 October 1969
3	8	Happy Birthday	31 October 1969
3	9	Art For Our Sake	7 November 1969
3	10	A Yap In The Night	14 November 1969
3	11	Change Of Scene	21 November 1969
3	12	No Man At The Helm	28 November 1969
3	14	Friendships Old, Friendships New	12 December 1969
3	15	Domestic Help	19 December 1969
3	16	Home From Home	2 January 1970
3	17	Country Style	9 January 1970

=== Out of the Unknown ===
29 out of 49 episodes are missing.

Series	Episode Title	Episode No.	Original Broadcast Date	Notes
1	The Fox and the Forest	8	22 November 1965	
1	Andover and the Android	9	29 November 1965	Sequences
2	Frankenstein Mark 2	2	13 October 1966	
2	Second Childhood	5	10 November 1966	Audio
2	The World in Silence	6	17 November 1966	
2	The Eye	7	24 November 1966	
2	The Fastest Draw	9	8 December 1966	
2	Too Many Cooks	10	15 December 1966	
2	Walk’s End	11	22 December 1966	
2	Satisfaction Guaranteed	12	29 December 1966	Audio & Sequences
2	The Prophet	13	1 January 1967	Audio
3	Immortality Inc.	1	7 January 1969	Audio
3	Liars!	2	14 January 1969	Audio & Sequences
3	Beach Head	4	28 January 1969	Audio
3	Something in the Cellar	5	4 February 1969	Audio
3	Random Quest	6	11 February 1969	Audio & Sequences
3	The Naked Sun	7	18 February 1969	Audio
3	The Little Black Bag	8	25 February 1969	Audio & Sequences
3	1 + 1 = 1.5	9	3 March 1969	Audio
3	The Fosters	10	11 March 1969	Audio
3	Target Generation	11	18 March 1969	Audio
3	The Yellow Pill	12	25 March 1969	Audio
3	Get Off My Cloud	13	1 April 1969	Audio
4	Taste of Evil	1	21 April 1971	
4	The Sons and the Daughters of Tomorrow	5	19 May 1971	
4	The Last Witness	7	2 June 1971	
4	The Chopper	9	16 June 1971	
4	The Uninvited	10	23 May 1971	Audio
4	The Shattered Eye	11	30 May 1971	

=== Paul Temple ===
Of the 52 episodes made 36 are missing.

=== Pride and Prejudice ===
All 6 episodes are missing.

Episode No.	Original Broadcast Date
1	24 January 1958
2	31 January 1958
3	7 February 1958
4	14 February 1958
5	21 February 1958
6	28 February 1958

=== The Quatermass Experiment ===
Of the 6 episodes made only the first 2 survive as the other 4 were never recorded during their live broadcast.

=== Quick Before They Catch Us ===
Out of 20 episodes made, 19 are missing and only 1 survives.

Episode No.	Episode Title	Original Broadcast Date
1	Power of Three: Part 1	7 May 1966
2	Power of Three: Part 2	14 May 1966
3	Power of Three: Part 3	21 May 1966
4	Power of Three: Part 4	28 May 1966
5	Mark of Distinction: Part 1	4 June 1966
6	Mark of Distinction: Part 2	11 June 1966
7	Mark of Distinction: Part 3	18 June 1966
8	Mark of Distinction: Part 4	25 June 1966
9	Season of the Skylark: Part 1	9 July 1966
10	Season of the Skylark: Part 2	16 July 1966
11	Season of the Skylark: Part 3	23 July 1966
12	Season of the Skylark: Part 4	30 July 1966
14	The Tungsten Ring: Part 2	13 August 1966
15	The Tungsten Ring: Part 3	20 August 1966
16	The Tungsten Ring: Part 4	27 August 1966
17	The Weasel Goes Pop: Part 1	3 September 1966
18	The Weasel Goes Pop: Part 2	10 September 1966
19	The Weasel Goes Pop: Part 3	17 September 1966
20	The Weasel Goes Pop: Part 4	24 September 1966

=== The Rag Trade ===
Of the 36 episodes made by the BBC, 14 are missing.

=== The Regiment ===
All 23 episodes exist but episode 8 of series 1 exists as a black and white 16mm telerecording, the 1970 play broadcast as part of the BBC Drama Playhouse that the series is based on also exist as a black and white telerecroding.

=== Ryan International ===
Out of the 10 episodes made, the first is missing and the rest exist as black and white telerecordings.

=== Scotch on the Rocks ===
Out of the 5 episodes made, episodes 2 and 3 are missing.

=== The Secret Garden ===
The 1960 BBC adaptation is missing 3 out of 8 episodes.

Episode No.	Episode Title	Original Broadcast Date
1	There is No-One Left	3 January 1960
4	The Door in the Wall	24 January 1960
7	Magic	14 February 1960

=== Smuggler's Bay ===
All 6 episodes are missing.

=== Softly, Softly/Softly, Softly: Task Force ===
81 out of 120 episodes of Softly, Softly are missing and 2 are incomplete. By comparison all 149 episodes of Softly, Softly: Task Force exist but 1 episode survives as a black and white 16mm telerecording.

=== Spy Trap ===
Only the first 4 episodes exist of the first 2 series and these episodes exist as black and white 16mm telerecordings, sequences exist for episode 29 of series 1, all episodes of series 3 exist.

=== Top of the Pops ===
Out of 2,255 episodes, 514 episodes are missing, 97 episodes are incomplete and 13 other episodes exist on formats of lower quality than the original.

=== The Troubleshooters ===
Of the 136 Episodes produced, 88 are missing, 48 survive, 16 of the 17 surviving colour episodes exist in black and white, 2 missing episode have domestic audio recordings and 1 missing episode has an existing unbroadcast technical trial run version done on colour film using a dual film/video camera.

Series	Episode No.	Episode Title	Original Broadcast Date	Notes
1(Mogul)	3	Safety Man	21 July 1965	
1(Mogul)	6	The Schloss Belt	11 August 1965	
1(Mogul)	8	The Way It Crumbles	25 August 1965	
1(Mogul)	9	A Job for Willy	1 September 1965	
1(Mogul)	10	Meet Miss Mogul	8 September 1965	
1(Mogul)	12	Driver of the Year	22 September 1965	
1(Mogul)	13	Borrowed Time	29 September 1965	
2	2	When You Gotta Go	7 May 1966	
2	3	Thea	14 May 1966	
2	4	If You Can’t Lick ‘Em	21 May 1966	
2	5	This Is Where I Came In	28 May 1966	
2	7	The Fires of Hell	11 June 1966	
2	8	Wingless Wonder	18 June 1966	
2	9	Cablegrams Come Expensive	25 June 1966	
2	10	Operation Saigon	2 July 1966	
2	12	Join the Club	16 July 1966	
2	13	Do Your Best for the Lads	23 July 1966	
3	1	Words Are Softer Than Oil	30 January 1967	
3	2	A Damn Great Lump of Oil	6 February 1967	
3	3	My Daughter Knows Her Way Around	20 February 1967	
3	4	Home and Dry	27 February 1967	
3	5	We’re None of Us Perfect	6 March 1967	
3	6	Think Big	13 March 1967	
3	8	Nothing to Do with Mogul	27 March 1967	
3	9	No Sentiment in Business?	3 April 1967	
3	10	Journey from the Interior	10 April 1967	
3	11	Long Knives Cut Deep	17 April 1967	
3	12	Women and Business Never Did Mix	24 April 1967	
3	13	There’s Always a Next Time	1 May 1967	
4	1	Dragon by the Tail	13 October 1967	
4	2	The Daring Young Men	20 October 1967	
4	3	Where the Carpet Ends	27 October 1967	
4	4	Winner Lose All	10 November 1967	
4	5	A Nice White Girl - Is She for Sale?	17 November 1967	
4	6	Mr. Know-How	24 November 1967	
4	7	And the Walls Came Tumbling Down	1 December 1967	
4	8	Good Lord No, It’s Illegal	8 December 1967	
4	9	Thanks for Nothing	15 December 1967	
4	10	Rest You Merry	22 December 1967	
4	11	Who Buys Who?	29 December 1967	
4	12	The Deeper You Dig	5 January 1968	
4	13	Kitchener Knew It Well	12 January 1968	Domestic audio recording exists
4	17	Stop It, You’re Breaking My Heart	16 February 1968	
4	19	Give Me the Simple Life	1 March 1968	
4	20	A Slight Problem with the Press	8 March 1968	
4	21	Never the Twain	15 March 1968	
4	22	Cut Off Whose Nose	22 March 1968	
4	24	The Dispossessed	5 April 1968	
4	26	The Minister of the Crown… And the Very Compromising Photograph	3 May 1968	
5	1	A Dirty Old Man and a Rare Bird	6 January 1969	
5	2	Twenty Years is No Time at All	13 January 1969	
5	3	How Much is One Man Worth?	20 January 1969	
5	4	If He Hollers - Let Him Go	27 January 1969	
5	5	A Very Special Relationship	3 February 1969	
5	6	There’s a Nasty Word - Love	10 February 1969	
5	7	You’re Not Going to Believe This, But…	17 February 1969	Unbroadcast technical trial run version exists
5	8	Take-Over is Two Four-Letter Words	24 February 1969	
5	9	Everybody is That Kind of Man	3 March 1969	
5	10	So You Think You’re One of Us	10 March 1969	
5	12	There’s This Bird, See…	24 March 1969	
5	13	You Want a Clockwork Nightingale	31 March 1969	
5	14	Don’t Ask, Take	14 April 1969	
5	15	Dr. Liebling, I Presume	21 April 1969	
5	16	You Can’t Trust Women	28 April 1969	
5	17	Really. She Did, She Really Did	5 May 1969	Domestic audio recording exists
5	18	Some of the Mud is Bound to stick	12 May 1969	
5	19	Lord, What a Tangled Web	19 May 1969	
5	20	And One Wise Man Came Out from the East	2 June 1969	
5	21	Let’s All Drop Out Together	9 June 1969	
5	22	She’ll Be Right Mate	16 June 1969	
5	23	It’s a Very Bad Day for Travelling	23 June 1969	
5	25	They Call Me Israel	7 July 1969	
5	26	Over the Hill	14 July 1969	
6	1	The Slick and the Dread	18 May 1970	
6	2	A Pig in a Pipe	25 May 1970	
6	4	Who Did You Say Inherits the Earth?	8 June 1970	
6	5	The Price of a Bride	15 June 1970	
6	6	Operation Black Gold	22 June 1970	
6	7	We Also Need Experts	29 June 1970	
6	8	I’m Glad I’m Just an Oilman…	6 July 1970	
6	10	The Dangerous Green Impala	20 July 1970	
6	11	A Truly Exotic Development	27 July 1970	
6	12	That’s Africa, Baby	3 August 1970	
6	13	They Shall Not Pass	10 August 1970	
6	14	Let’s See the Colour of Your Money	17 August 1970	
6	15	Hey We’ve Got a Problem Here	24 August 1970	
6	16	The Order of the Good Time	31 August 1970	
6	17	Injury to the Nation	7 September 1970	

=== Vendetta ===
Out of 36 episodes, 27 are missing and 1 is incomplete. 1 episode has a surviving domestic audio recording.

Series	Episode No.	Episode Title	Original Broadcast Date	Notes
1	2	The Dolly Man	11 November 1966	
1	3	The Widow Man	18 November 1966	Incomplete
1	4	The Lullaby Man	25 November 1966	
1	6	The Putty Man	9 December 1966	
1	7	The Ice-Cream Man	16 December 1966	
1	10	The Chemical Man	6 January 1967	
1	11	The Mourning Man	13 January 1967	
1	13	The Madonna Man	27 January 1967	
2	1	The Ten-Per-Cent Man	21 June 1967	
2	2	The Holy Man	28 June 1967	
2	3	The Lady’s Man	5 July 1967	
2	4	The Target Man	12 July 1967	
2	5	The Suicide Man	19 July 1967	Audio Exists
2	7	The Revolutionary Man	2 August 1967	
2	8	The Pilgrim Man	9 August 1967	
2	9	The Scandal Man	16 August 1967	
2	10	The Desperate Man	23 August 1967	
2	11	The Solitary Man	30 August 1967	
2	13	The Dying Man	13 September 1967	
3	1	The Saint Valentine’s Man	1 July 1968	
3	2	The Twelve-Year-Old Man	8 July 1968	
3	4	The Hit and Run Man	22 July 1968	
3	5	The Money Man	29 July 1968	
3	6	The Paradise Man	5 August 1968	
3	7	The Hollow Man	12 August 1968	
3	8	The Blackfoot Man	19 August 1968	
3	9	The Partisan Man	26 August 1968	
3	10	The Anniversary Man	2 September 1968	

=== The Venturers ===
All 10 are missing and the 1972 play of Drama Playhouse that the series is based on exists as a black and white telerecording.

=== Z-Cars ===
Out of 801 episodes, 462 episodes are missing.
