= Family Affairs (1949 TV serial) =

- Genre: Television comedy
- Written by: Eric Maschwitz
- Starring: Heather Thatcher; Michael Shepley; Denis Goacher; Betty Blackler; David Preston; Madoline Thomas
- Country of origin: United Kingdom
- Original language: English
- No. of series: 1
- No. of episodes: 14

Production
- Producer: Michael Mills
- Production company: BBC

Original release
- Network: BBC Television Service
- Release: October 29, 1949 – February 18, 1950

Family Affairs is the first television serial. It was broadcast by BBC Television in fourteen episodes from 1949–1950.

Among the actors who appeared in this comedy series are Daphne Oxenford, Heather Chasen and Michael Shepley. Chasen and Shepley had minor roles.

The episodes of Family Affairs are lost broadcasts; no recordings are known to remain.

== See also ==
- List of lost television broadcasts
- List of lost television broadcasts in the United Kingdom
