= Electronicam =

System that shot an image on film and television at the same time through a common lens

The Honeymooners was filmed using three Electronicams.

Electronicam was a television recording system that shot an image on film and television at the same time through a common lens. It was developed by James L. Caddigan for the DuMont Television Network in the 1950s, before electronic recording on videotape was available. Since the film directly captured live scenes, its quality was much higher than the commonly used kinescope films, which were shot from a TV screen. This improved film production by reducing the shooting time.

== How it worked ==
The image passes through a lens into a beam splitter that sends half the light to a 35 mm or 16 mm camera mounted on the right side of the television camera. The other half of the light passes to the other side, through a 45-degree angle mirror and into a video camera tube. Because the camera dollies had to support two cameras—one conventional electronic image orthicon TV camera tube, and one 35mm motion picture camera—the system was bulky and heavy, and somewhat clumsy in operation. This made complex productions problematic. Single-stage shows, such as The Honeymooners, were relatively easy since they had few sets and generally small casts.

In the studio, when two or three Electronicam cameras were used, a kinescope system recorded the live feed (as broadcast), so the Electronicam films could later be edited to match. The audio was recorded separately, onto either a magnetic fullcoat (1952, and all later) or as an optical soundtrack negative (pre-1952).

== Usage ==
The DuMont Television Network used Electronicams in 1955 to produce most of its studio-based programming since it had (except for occasional sports events) discontinued use of coaxial cable and microwave links to connect stations. Stations were sent films of shows for broadcast.

The "Classic 39" episodes of The Honeymooners aired during the 1955–56 television season on CBS were shot with Electronicams, which meant they could be rerun on broadcast TV and eventually transferred to home video. Without Electronicams, the half-hour The Honeymooners episodes in the 1955-56 season may have been broadcast live and only exist as poor-quality kinescopes.

Also, around 1956 British producer J. Arthur Rank brought three Electronicams to the United Kingdom to experiment but eventually was disappointed with the picture quality.

The introduction of Ampex's videotape recorder in mid-1956 began to eliminate the need for Electronicam and similar systems, allowing electronic recording from live video cameras.

== See also ==
- Electronovision
