= Dot crawl =

Visual artifact present in composite video signals

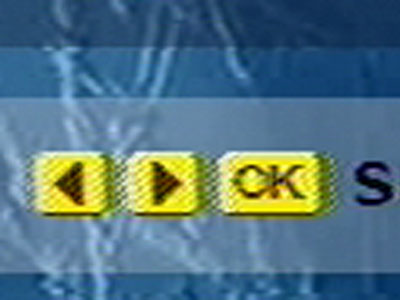
Enlarged detail from a video source exhibiting dot crawl. Note the distinctive checkerboard pattern on the vertical edges between yellow and blue areas.

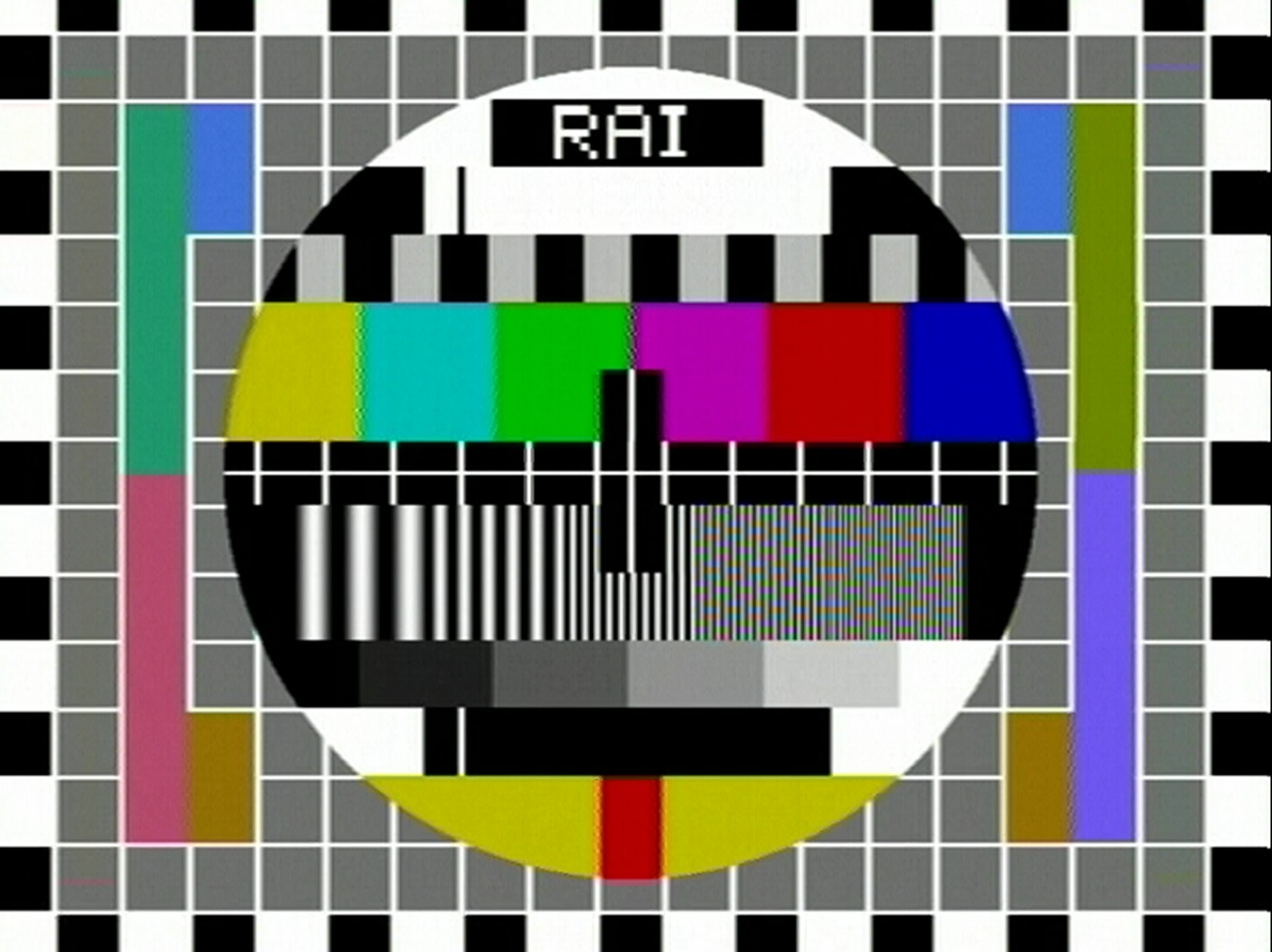
RAI Philips test card with artifacts visible in areas of contact between solid colors (ex: yellow and cyan) and on high horizontal detail ("rainbows" over fine vertical stripes pattern) - click to enlarge

Dot crawl (also known as chroma crawl or cross-luma) is a visual defect of color analog video standards when signals are transmitted as composite video, as in terrestrial broadcast television. It consists of moving checkerboard patterns which appear along horizontal color transitions (vertical edges). It results from intermodulation or crosstalk between chrominance and luminance components of the signal, which are imperfectly multiplexed in the frequency domain.

The term is more associated with the NTSC analog color TV system, but is also present in PAL (see Chroma dots). Although the interference patterns are slightly different depending on the system used, they have the same cause and the same general principles apply. A related effect, color bleed or rainbow artifacts, is discussed below.

== Description ==
Intermodulation or crosstalk problems take two forms:

- chrominance interference in luminance (chrominance being interpreted as luminance),
- luminance interference in chrominance.

Dot crawl is most visible when the chrominance is transmitted with a high bandwidth, so that its spectrum reaches well into the band of frequencies used by the luminance signal in the composite video signal. This causes high-frequency chrominance detail at color transitions to be interpreted as luminance detail.

Some (mostly older) video-game consoles and home computers use nonstandard color burst phases, thereby producing dot crawl that appears quite different from that seen in broadcast NTSC or PAL. The effect is more noticeable on these cases due to the saturated colors and small pixel scale details normally present on computer graphics.

The opposite problem, luminance interference in chroma, is the appearance of a colored noise in image areas with high levels of detail. This results from high-frequency luminance detail crossing into the frequencies used by the chrominance channel and producing false coloration, known as color bleed or rainbow artifacts. Bleed can also make narrowly spaced text difficult to read. Some computers, such as the Apple II, or IBM PC compatibles with CGA graphics utilized this to generate color (see Composite artifact colors).

== History ==
Dot crawl has long been recognized as a problem by professionals since the creation of composite video. When the NTSC standard was adopted in the 1950s, TV engineers realized that it should theoretically be possible to design a filter to properly separate the luminance and chroma signals. However, the vacuum tube-based electronics of the time did not permit any cost-effective method of implementing a comb filter. Thus, the early color TVs used only notch filters, which cut the luminance off at 3.5 MHz. This effectively reduced the luminance bandwidth (normally 4 MHz) to that of the chroma, causing considerable color bleed.

=== Comb filters ===
By the 1970s, TVs had begun using solid-state electronics and the first comb filters appeared. This coincides with the advent of LaserDiscs and other high quality media that make the problem noticeable for the public. However, comb filters were expensive and only high-end TVs used them, while most color sets continued to use notch filters.

By the 1990s, a further development took place with the advent of three-line digital comb filters. This type of filter uses a computer to analyze the NTSC signal three scan lines at a time and determine the best place to put the chroma and luminance. During this period, digital filters became standard in high-end TVs while the older analog filter began appearing in cheaper models (although notch filters were still widely used). Modern HDTVs and capture devices do a much better job at eliminating dot crawl than traditional CRT TVs and earlier LCD TVs.

However, no comb filter can eliminate NTSC artifacts and the only complete solutions to dot crawl are not to use NTSC or PAL composite video, maintaining the signals separately by using S-Video or component video connections instead, or encoding the chrominance signal differently as in SECAM or any modern digital video standard as long as the source video has never been processed using any video system vulnerable to dot crawl.

=== Other solutions ===
Some consoles like the PlayStation 3 have a built-in filter that reduces dot crawl and "rainbow effect" almost completely. So it is technically possible, without the use of a built-in TV filter, to remove this negative effect in the composite video signal in both NTSC and PAL signals.

Likewise Colour-plus, a technique part of the PALplus standard introduced in 1993, gives a cleaner luminance/chrominance separation in the PALplus receiver. It is used with signals with high horizontal luminance frequencies (3 MHz) that share the spectrum with the chrominance signals. Colour pictures on both standard and PALplus receivers are enhanced.

== Color recovery ==
Monochrome film recordings of color television programs may exhibit dot crawl, and starting in 2008 this has been used to recover the original color information in a process called color recovery.

== See also ==
- Composite artifact colors
- Chroma dots
- Hanover bars
- Color framing
