= Richard T. Russell =

British programmer

Richard Thomas Russell is the creator of the BBC BASIC for Windows programming language and the author of the Z80 and MS-DOS versions of BBC BASIC.

He was educated at Gravesend Grammar School and Hertford College, Oxford graduating with a degree in physics in 1973. The same year he began work at the BBC as a design engineer. During his career with the BBC he was involved with several high-profile projects including the BBC Microcomputer and the BBC Domesday Project. He retired from the BBC in 2006.

His "2D DVE for Virtual Studios" won Video R&D Achievement of the Year at the International Broadcasting Awards 1996, and his hardware implementation of the BBC's patented Transform PAL Decoder has been acclaimed as probably the best PAL decoder in the world.

In 2008 he developed a technique for recovering the colour from the black-and-white telerecordings of TV programmes, making it possible to restore full colour versions of some programmes for which no conventional colour recordings exist. He is featured in the documentary "The Story of Are You Being Served?" talking about his work on the colour restoration process.

In addition to creating BBC BASIC for Windows, Russell also runs a support group for the language to which he regularly contributes tips, advice and comments on other users' code. He is married and lives in Norfolk in the United Kingdom.
