= Colour recovery =

Practice of restoring colour to monochrome copies of colour programmes

Colour recovery (or colour restoration) is a process that restores lost colour to television programmes that were originally recorded on colour videotape but for which only black-and-white copies exist. This is not the same as colourisation, a process by which colour is artificially added to source material that was always black-and-white (or for which no colour information was preserved in the black-and-white copy), or used to enhance poor-quality original sources. Colour recovery is a newer, fundamentally different process that uses residual colour information. Most of the work has been performed on PAL programmes, but the concept is not fundamentally restricted to that system.

Colour recovery can be based on combining colour information from lower-quality recordings, or in the case of the BBC's new method, the particular effects created when colour source material was encoded into the common analogue television format PAL for transmission. With early colour televisions, until the mid-1980s, this could lead to a problem known as dot crawl because the encoding of colour information could interfere with the underlying signal. This causes a form of distortion in the output signal displayed on the screen. The pattern is evident even if the resulting image is recorded on film and in black and white. The colour recovery process detects these telltale patterns and uses them to decode the original colours.

As of 2018, colour recovery has successfully been applied to episodes of the BBC TV programmes Doctor Who (exception of the first part of the episode Invasion of the Dinosaurs), Dad's Army, Are You Being Served? and The Morecambe & Wise Show.

== Background ==
Because of the well-documented practice of wiping, many original videotape recordings of colour programmes were lost. However, in the case of the BBC, many telerecorded black-and-white film copies of affected programmes survived. For a variety of technical and practical reasons (for example, various incompatible international television standards and the high cost of videotape compared to film), black-and-white film copies were the preferred medium for selling programmes overseas. This practice ultimately caused many programmes that were originally recorded and transmitted in colour to survive only in black-and-white form after the practice of wiping ceased.

== Methods of colour recovery ==
=== From off-air recordings ===
During the 1970s, various off-air NTSC video recordings were made by American and Canadian Doctor Who fans that were later returned to the BBC. Whilst the quality of these early domestic video recordings were not suitable for broadcast, the lower-definition chrominance signal could be retrieved from them. This signal could be successfully combined with the luminance signal from digitally scanned existing broadcast-quality monochrome telerecordings to produce new colour master copies suitable for broadcast and sales. In the 1990s, this method was performed by the Doctor Who Restoration Team, and several colour Doctor Who serials were subsequently released on VHS. Combining the recorded colour signals with the monochrome telerecordings is a complex task requiring digital processing (for example, matching the different screen sizes of the two recordings). By the early 1990s, cheaply available, sufficiently powerful computer hardware and software made this task practical for the first time.

Dad's Army episode "Room at the Bottom" – to the left is the 16 mm black-and-white copy; to the right is the restored colour version.

=== From chroma crawl ===
Black-and-white television systems predate those with colour, so subsequent analogue colour broadcast systems have been designed with backward compatibility in mind (known as a compatible colour system). Thus, the chrominance (colour) signal is typically forced into the same channel as the luminance (brightness) signal, modulated on a fixed frequency known as the colour subcarrier. Black-and-white televisions do not decode this extra colour information in the subcarrier, using only the luminance to provide a monochrome picture. However, because of limited bandwidth in the video channel, the chrominance and luminance signals bleed into each other considerably, causing the colour information to appear as chroma crawl or chroma dots on black-and-white television sets. This phenomenon is normally considered a nuisance in analogue broadcasting. However, because many telerecordings were sourced from black-and-white screens without filters to remove the interference, these patterns are retained even in the existing monochrome film prints and theoretically contain the original colour information, but occasionally the colour information was filtered using a notch filter and is thereby lost. The idea to recover this information was originally suggested by BBC researcher James Insell.

In practice, the recovery of this colour information from telerecordings is highly complex for several reasons. The colour reference-timing signal, known as the colour burst, is absent from telerecordings, as it is nominally off the edge of the visible screen area that is recorded. This timing must be recovered as the phase of the chroma dots, which is represented by their horizontal position on the screen, determines the hue of the reconstructed colours. Because of the alternating property of the PAL format, it is possible to restrict the colours to four possibilities, requiring much less guesswork as compared to NTSC. Distortions in the geometry of the telerecordings resulting from recording from a curved CRT screen onto film means that a transformation must be applied to infer the original positions of the chroma dots within the broadcast.

However, these technical obstacles were overcome in 2008, and software written by developer Richard T. Russell at the informal Colour Recovery Working Group was employed, finally resulting in the broadcast and release of colour-recovered episodes of Dad's Army and Doctor Who, and subsequently two episodes of The Morecambe & Wise Show as well as the "Party Political Broadcast (Choreographed)" sketch from Monty Python's Flying Circus.

Example of the chroma dot reconstruction:

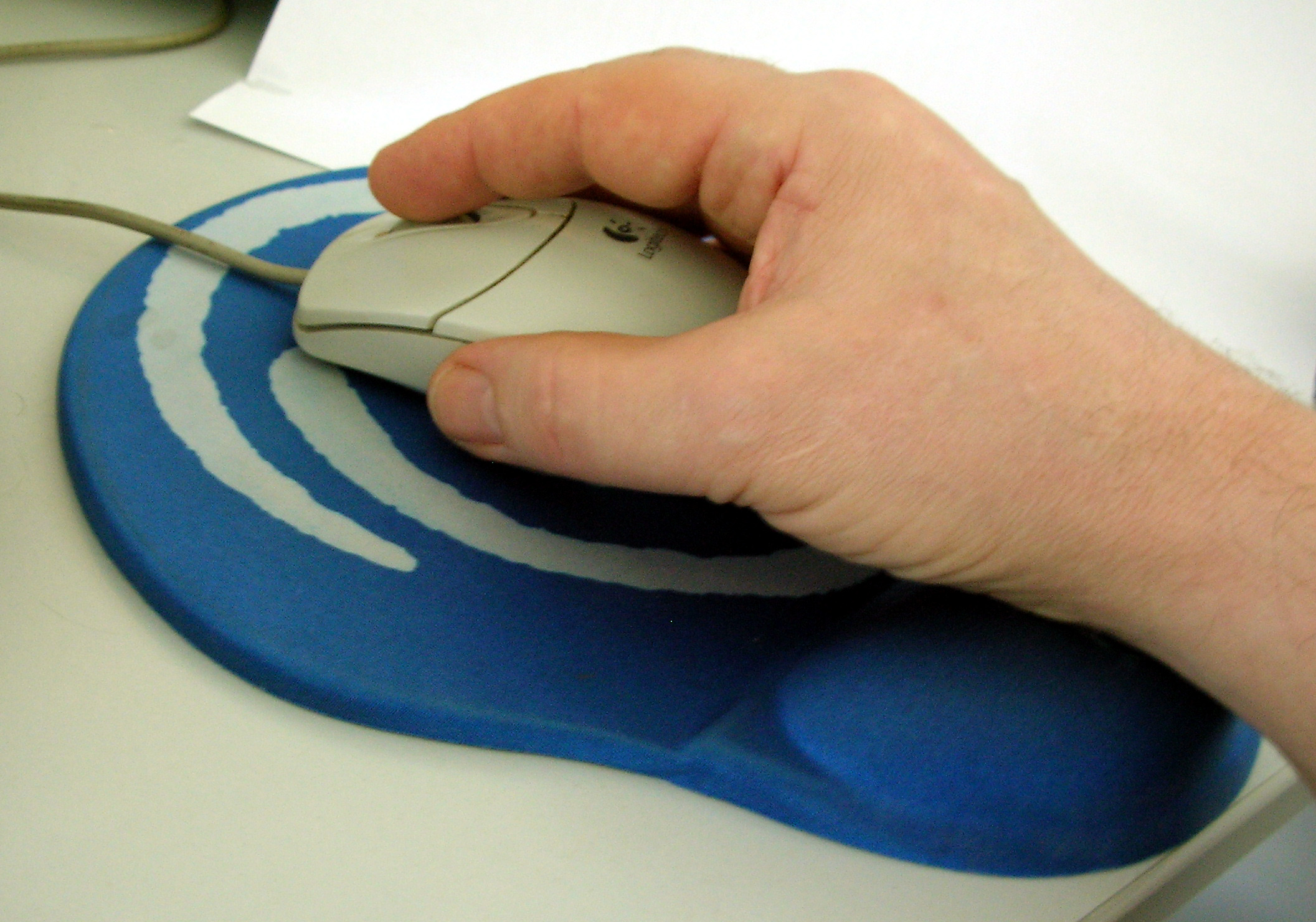
Original picture

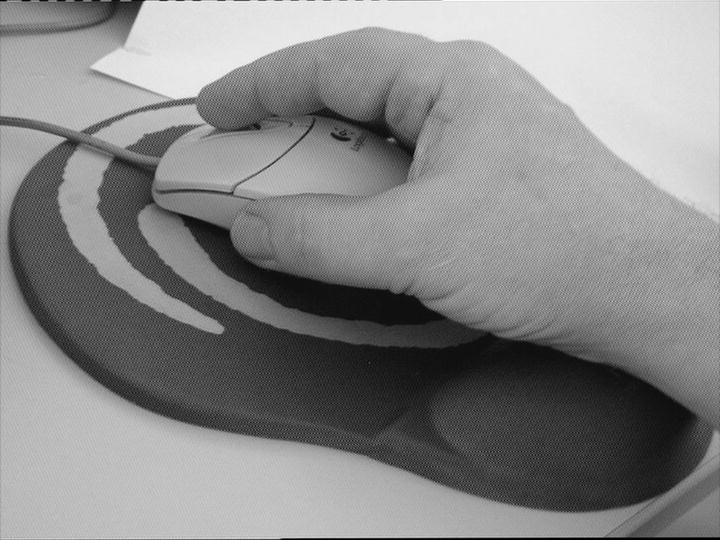
Black-and-white picture with PAL chroma dots

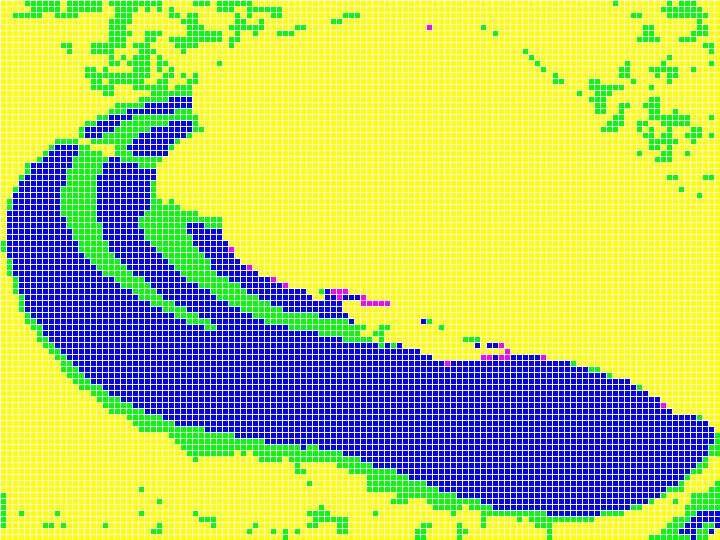
Quadrant assignment for colour reconstruction (Russell's software)

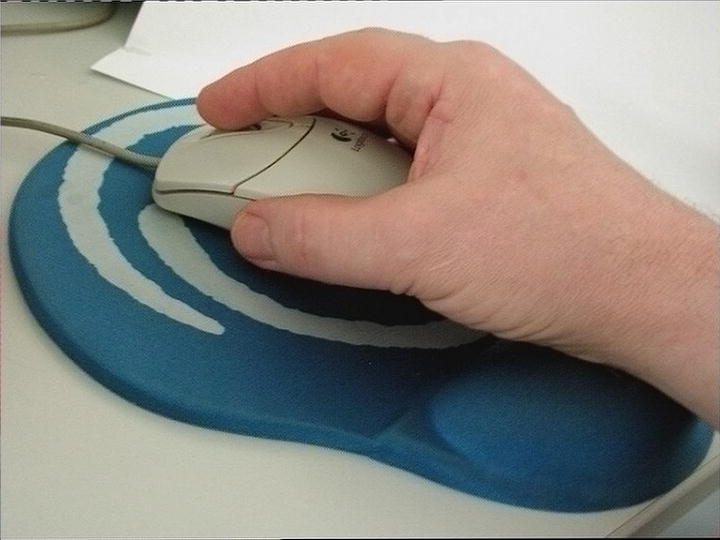
Reconstructed colour picture (Russell's software)

== See also ==
- Room at the Bottom (Dad's Army) § Colour restoration of the original television recording
- Reverse Standards Conversion
- Digital image processing
- Image color transfer
- Luminance HDR
