= Composite video =

Baseband analog video signal format

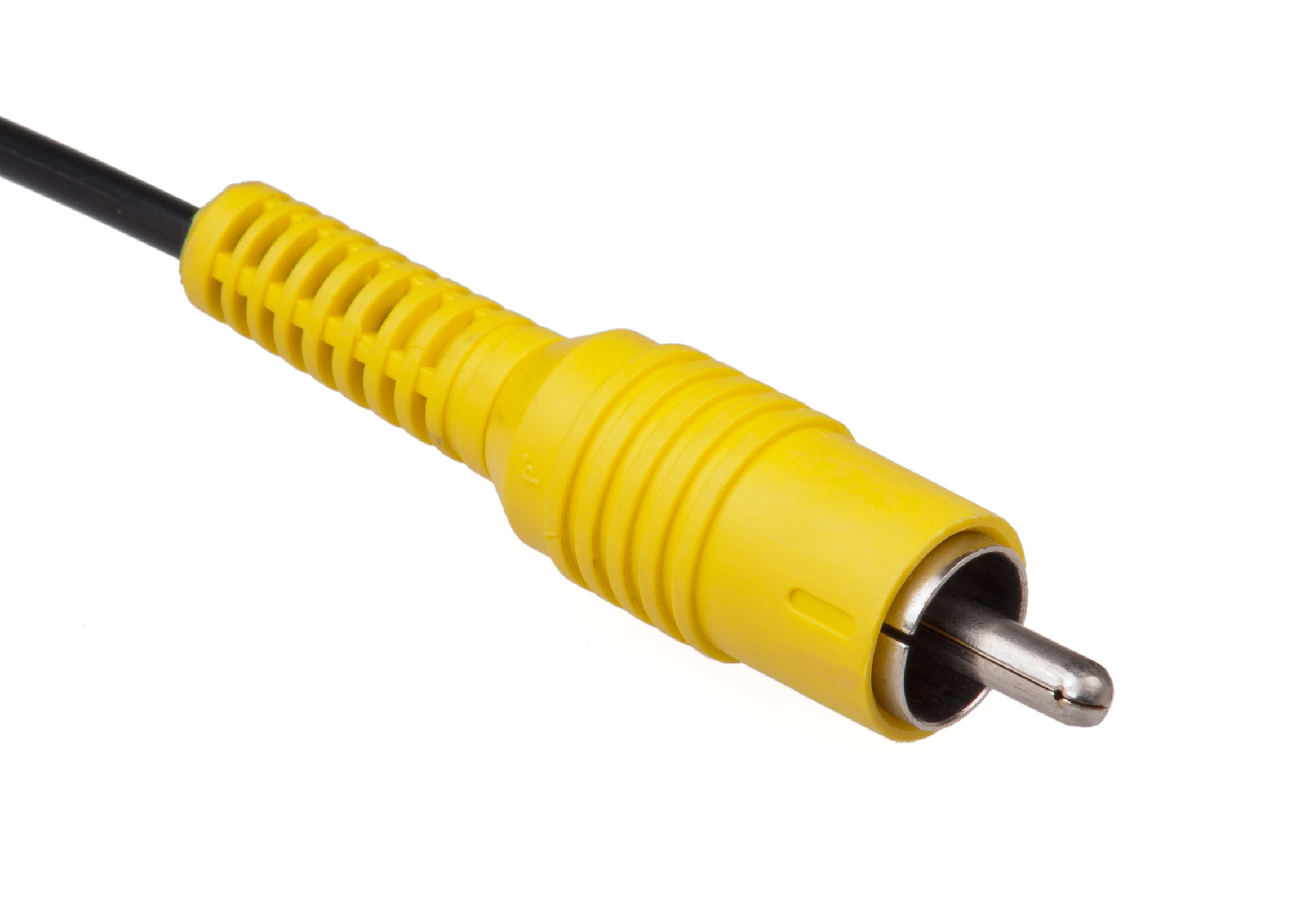
- On consumer products, a yellow RCA connector is typically used for composite video.
- Type: Analog video connector

Production history
- Designer: RCA
- Designed: 1954–1956
- Superseded by: Analog: S-Video & Component & SCART; Digital: SDI & HDMI

General specifications
- External: Yes
- Audio signal: Requires separate cables
- Video signal: NTSC, PAL or SECAM video
- Cable: Coaxial
- Pins: 1 plus grounding shield
- Connector: RCA, BNC, others

Electrical
- Signal: 1 volt
- Max. voltage: 1.5

Pinout
| Pin 1 | center | video |
| Pin 2 | sheath | ground |

Composite video, also known as CVBS (composite video baseband signal or color, video, blanking and sync), is an analog video format that combines image information—such as brightness (luminance), color (chrominance), and synchronization, into a single signal transmitted over one channel. It is most commonly used for standard-definition television, and is sometimes referred to as SD video.

The signal is typically carried on a yellow RCA connector, with separate connectors used for left and right audio channels; however, cables with RCA connectors of any color can be used. For example, an RGB Component Video cable can be used (Red for video, Green and Blue for audio). In professional equipment, a BNC connector is often used instead. Other connector types may appear in compact consumer devices like digital cameras.

Composite video supports several line resolutions, including 405-line, 525-line, and 625-line interlaced formats. It exists in three major regional variants based on analog color encoding standards: NTSC, PAL, and SECAM. The same format can also be used to transmit monochrome (black-and-white) video.

== Signal components ==
Composite video signal graphic

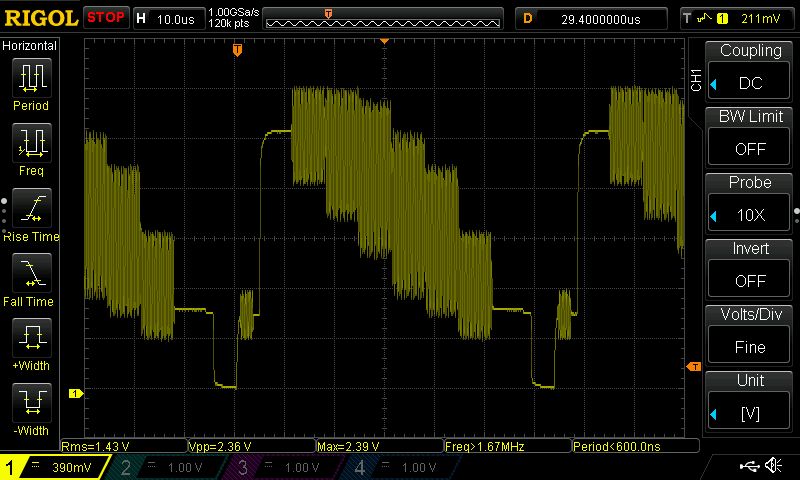
NTSC composite video signal (analog) displayed on a DSO.

A composite video signal combines, on one wire, the video information required to recreate a color picture, as well as line and frame synchronization pulses. The color video signal is a linear combination of the luminance (Y) of the picture and a chrominance subcarrier which carries the color information (C), a combination of hue and saturation. Details of the combining process vary between the NTSC, PAL and SECAM systems.

The frequency spectrum of the modulated color signal overlaps that of the baseband signal, and separation relies on the fact that frequency components of the baseband signal tend to be near harmonics of the horizontal scanning rate, while the color carrier is selected to be an odd multiple of half the horizontal scanning rate; this produces a modulated color signal that consists mainly of harmonic frequencies that fall between the harmonics in the baseband luma signal, rather than both being in separate continuous frequency bands alongside each other in the frequency domain. The signals may be separated using a comb filter. In other words, the combination of luma and chrominance is indeed a frequency-division technique, but it is much more complex than typical frequency-division multiplexing systems like the one used to multiplex analog radio stations on both the AM and FM bands.

A gated and filtered signal derived from the color subcarrier, called the color burst, is added to the horizontal blanking interval of each line (excluding lines in the vertical sync interval) as a synchronizing signal and amplitude reference for the chrominance signals. In NTSC composite video, the 3.58 MHz burst signal is inverted in phase (180° out of phase) from the reference subcarrier. In PAL, the phase of the 4.43 MHz color subcarrier alternates on successive lines. In SECAM, no color burst is used since phase information is irrelevant.

=== Composite artifacts ===
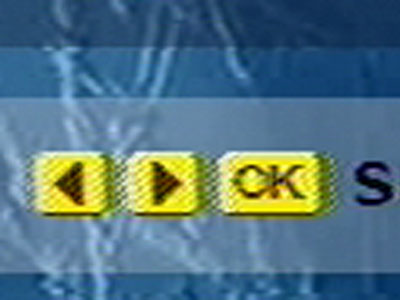
Enlarged detail from a video source exhibiting dot crawl. Note the distinctive checkerboard pattern on the vertical edges between yellow and blue areas.

The combining of component signals to form the composite signal does the same, causing a checkerboard video artifact known as dot crawl. Dot crawl is a defect that results from crosstalk due to the intermodulation of the chrominance and luminance components of the signal. This is usually seen when chrominance is transmitted with high bandwidth, and its spectrum reaches into the band of the luminance frequencies. Comb filters are commonly used to separate signals and eliminate these artifacts from composite sources. S-Video and component video avoid this problem as they maintain the component signals physically separate.

=== Recording ===
Most home analog video equipment record a signal in (roughly) composite format: LaserDiscs and type C videotape for example store a true composite signal modulated, while consumer videotape formats (including VHS and Betamax) and commercial and industrial tape formats (including U-matic) use modified composite signals FM encoded (generally known as color-under). The professional D-2 videocassette format digitally stores a sampled analog composite video signal on magnetic tape. With the advent of affordable, high-speed analog-to-digital converters, real-time composite-to-YUV sampled digital sampling has been possible since the 1980s, and raw waveform sampling and software decoding have been possible since the 2010s.

=== Extensions ===
A number of so-called extensions to the visible TV image can be transmitted using composite video. Since TV screens hide the vertical blanking interval of a composite video signal, these take advantage of the unseen parts of the signal. Examples of extensions include teletext, closed captioning, information regarding the show title, a set of reference colors that allows TV sets to automatically correct NTSC hue maladjustments, widescreen signaling (WSS) for switching between 4:3 and 16:9 display formats, etc.

== Connectors and cable ==
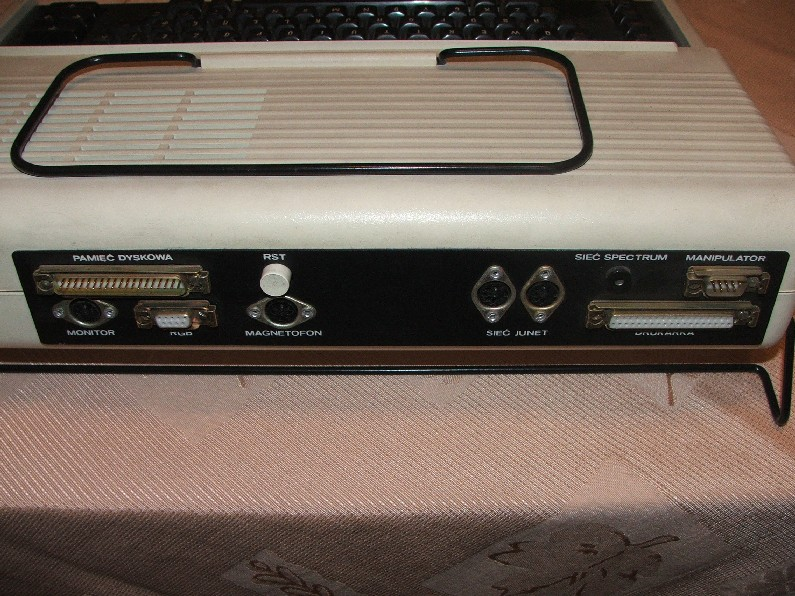
Rear of the Polish Elwro 800 Junior computer. DIN output carries a composite video signal to an external monitor.

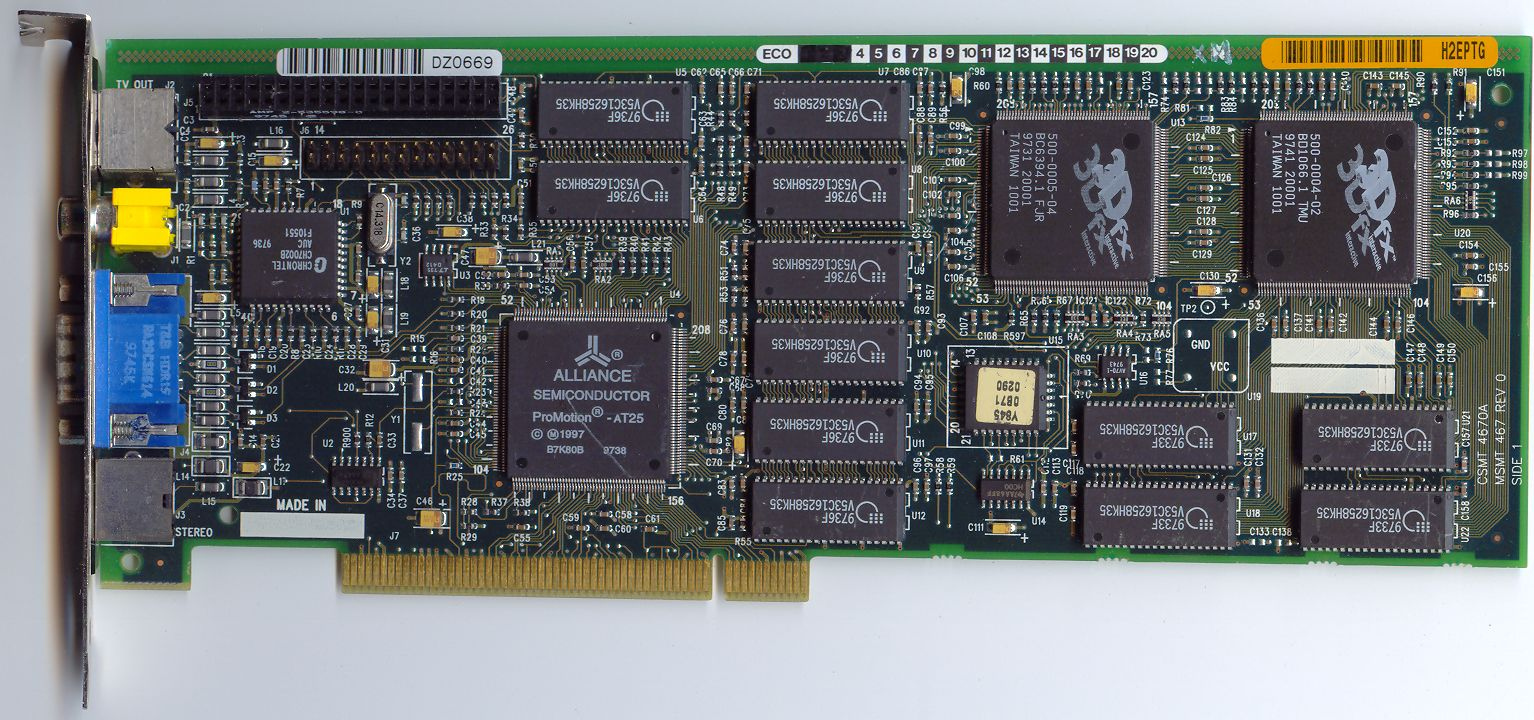
Intergraph Intense3D Voodoo Rush with TV-out; S-video (topmost connector) and composite video (yellow RCA connector below)

In home applications, the composite video signal is typically connected using an RCA connector, normally yellow. It is often accompanied by red and white connectors for right and left audio channels, respectively. BNC connectors and higher quality coaxial cable are often used in professional television studios and post-production applications. BNC connectors were also used for composite video connections on early home VCRs, often accompanied by either RCA connector or a 5-pin DIN connector for audio. The BNC connector, in turn, post-dated the PL-259 connector featured on first-generation VCRs.

Video cables are 75 ohm impedance, low in capacitance. Typical values run from 52 pF/m for an HDPE-foamed dielectric precision video cable to 69 pF/m for a solid PE dielectric cable.

== Digital sampling and modern usage ==
The active image area of composite and S-Video signals is digitally stored at 720 × 576 i25 PAL and 720 × 480 i29.7 (or 720 × 488) pixels. This does not represent the whole signal. Hardware typically samples at four times the color subcarrier frequency (4fsc), which includes the vertical blanking interval (VBI). Only commercial video capture devices used in broadcast output images with the extra VBI space. Direct sampling with high-speed ADCs and software time base correction has allowed projects like the open-source CVBS-Decode to create a D-2 like a 4fsc stream that preserves and allows full presentation and inspection of the entire composite signal. This can then be chroma-decoded to a color image on a standard computer or via DAC, played back to a TV.

Modern televisions don't always include a composite video input, however European TVs have to include at least one SCART connector which accepts composite video as well as YPbPr component video and sometimes S-Video; for TVs outside of Europe that lack a composite video input; composite to HDMI adaptors exist that combine composite video, left and right audio to either 480 or 576, or upscaled to 720 or 1080.

== See also ==
- List of video connectors
- NTSC color encoding
- PAL color encoding
