= Chroma dots =

Visual artifact

Chroma dots are visual artifacts caused by displaying an unfiltered PAL analogue colour video signal on a black-and-white television or monitor. They are commonly found on black-and-white recordings of television programmes originally made in colour. Chroma dots were once regarded as undesirable picture noise, but recent advances in computer technology have allowed them to be used to reconstruct the original colour signal from black-and-white recordings, providing a means to re-colour material where the original colour copy is lost.

Example of the chroma dot reconstruction:

Example of the chroma dot reconstruction (please view images at 100%)

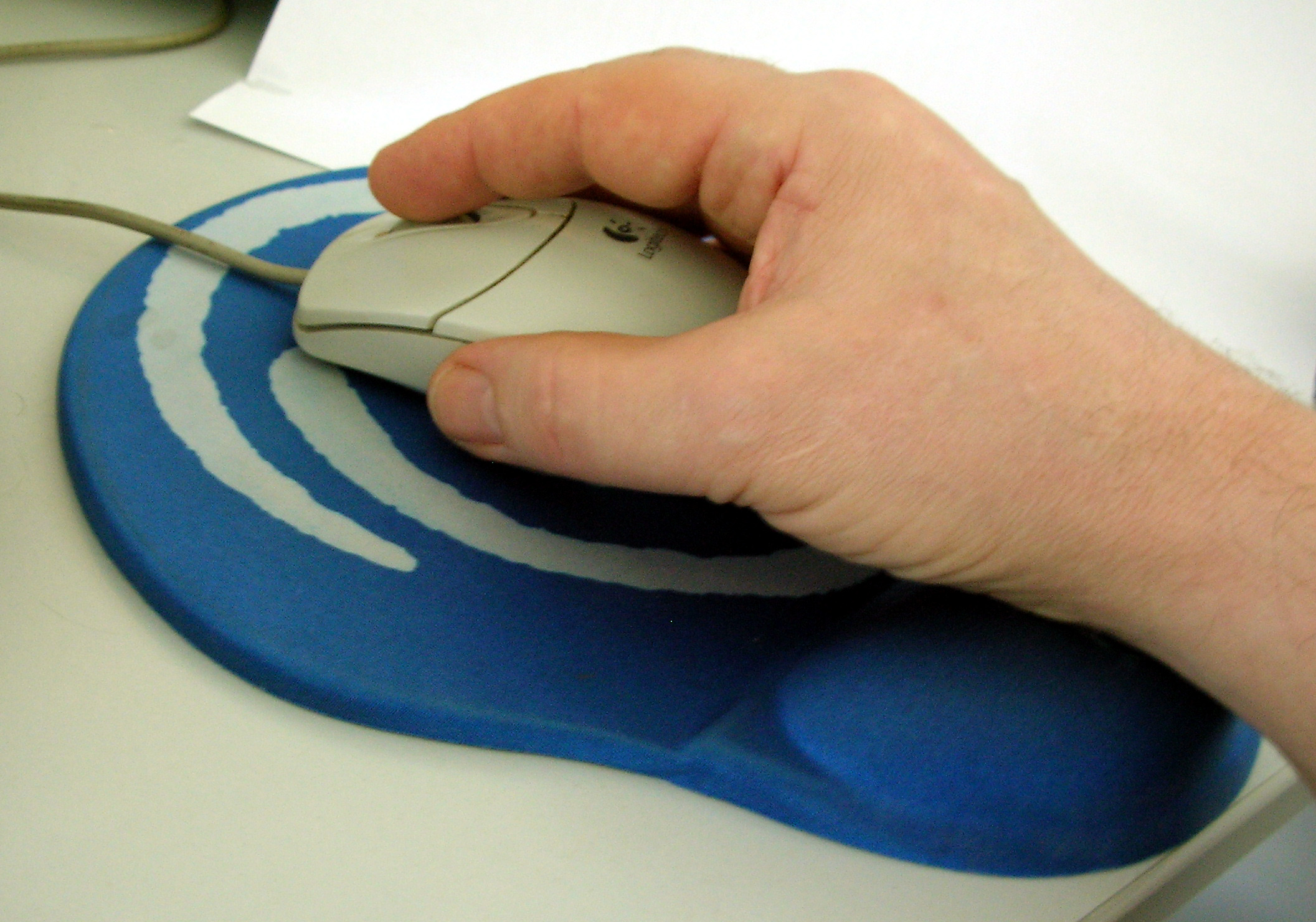
Original picture

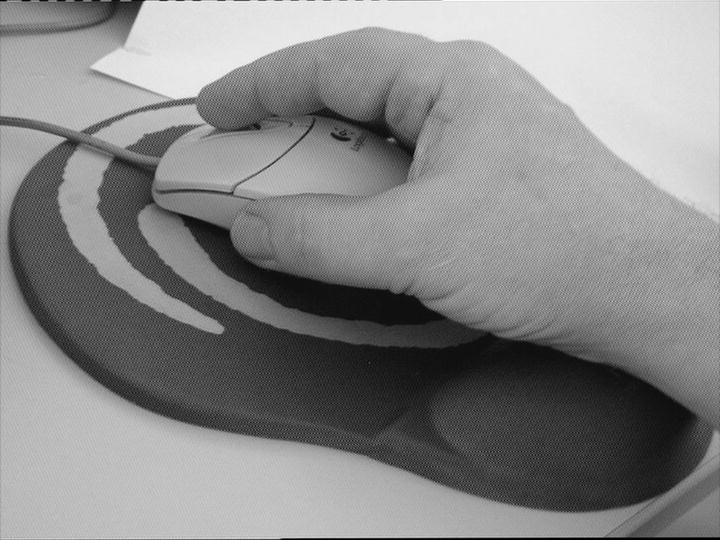
Black and white picture with chroma dots

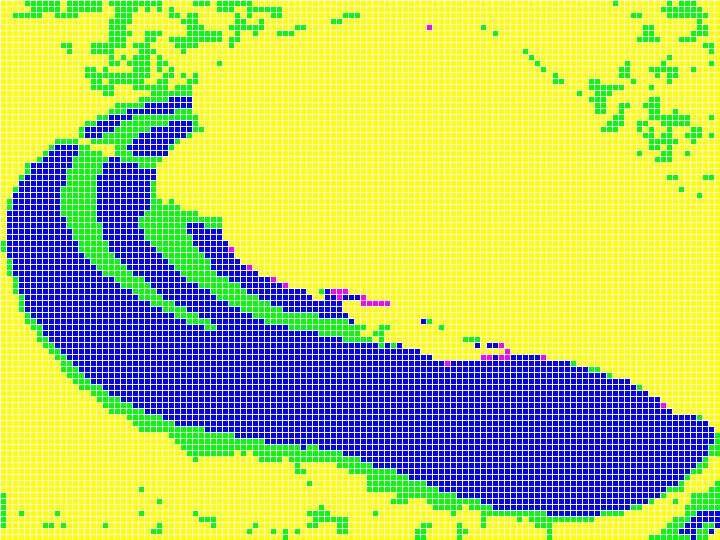
Quadrant calculation for Colour reconstruction

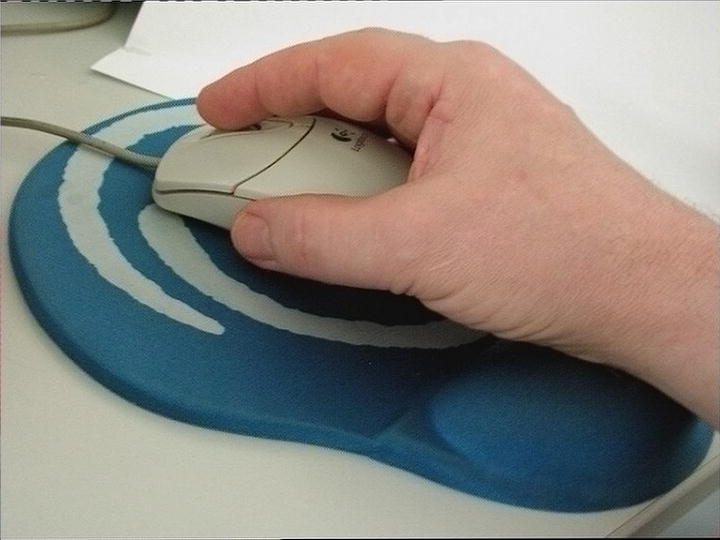
Reconstructed Colour picture (reconstructed using software written by Richard Russell)

== Background ==
Analogue colour video signals comprise two components: luminance and chrominance. The luminance component describes the brightness of each part of the picture, while the chrominance component describes the colour tone. When displayed on a black-and-white monitor, the luminance signal produces a normal black-and-white image, while the chrominance signal manifests as a fine pattern of dots of varying size and intensity overlaid over the black-and-white picture. A related phenomenon is dot crawl, which can produce visual artifacts in colour pictures.

== History ==
In the early days of colour television, it was common practice for broadcasters to produce black-and-white film copies of colour programmes for sale and transmission in territories lacking colour broadcast facilities or employing different colour television systems. During the telerecording process, it was normal practice to insert a filter circuit between the colour video output and the black-and-white monitor input in order to remove the colour signal and prevent the formation of chroma dots. In many cases, however, the filter was not used and the chroma dot patterning is permanently burned into the resulting film recording.

== Use in restoration ==
In 1994, James Insell, a BBC engineer, noticed that when playing back a copy of a black-and-white telerecording through colour video equipment, spurious colour was generated by the presence of chroma dots in the picture. He theorised that it might be possible to use the chroma dots to reconstruct the original colour signal, and in 2007, set up a working group to carry out further research.

In 2008, it was announced that members of the working group had successfully managed to restore the Dad's Army episode "Room at the Bottom" using information from the chroma dot patterning. The process has since been used to restore other programmes including the pilot episode of Are You Being Served? and various episodes of Doctor Who: (Planet of the Daleks, episode 3; Invasion of the Dinosaurs, episode 1; and episodes 2–6 of The Mind of Evil). The working group hope that the technique may enable the restoration of many other programmes for which no colour copy is known to exist. However, the results are dependent on whether or not chroma dot patterning is present and the quality of the black-and-white recording.
