= Room at the Bottom (Dad's Army) =

- Dad's Army episode
- Episode no.: Series 3 Episode 6
- Directed by: David Croft
- Story by: Jimmy Perry and David Croft
- Original air date: 16 October 1969
- Running time: 30 minutes

Episode chronology
| ← Previous "Something Nasty in the Vault" | Next → "Big Guns" |

"Room at the Bottom" is the sixth episode of the third series of the British comedy series Dad's Army that was originally transmitted on Thursday 16 October 1969.

== Plot ==
Wilson is sitting at Mainwaring's desk, when Captain Bailey from GHQ arrives. He asks Wilson about how long Mainwaring has been in charge. Wilson says it was ever since they were Local Defence Volunteers. Bailey is surprised because there were no commissions in the LDV, and Wilson admits that Mainwaring made himself a captain. Bailey tells him that it is more ordinary to have a lieutenant in charge of a platoon, so Mainwaring must remove one of his pips. Wilson is delighted and is even more delighted when Walker brings him his new hat: a beret.

Wilson, with some glee, practises what he is going to say to Mainwaring, who then arrives, announcing that he has recruited a Drill Sergeant for drill practice. Wilson tells him about Bailey's visit, but Mainwaring laughs it off. He rings GHQ and speaks to a sergeant, who knows nothing about it. He waits for Wilson's explanation, and concludes that Wilson is jealous of him, and that is the reason why he bought a beret. GHQ rings; Mainwaring answers and is horrified to learn that Wilson was telling the truth. Wilson insists that he is sorry for Mainwaring, even though he is laughing in his face.

Godfrey sees Mainwaring removing his pips, offering to assist based on his former experience in tailoring, but is quickly dismissed by Mainwaring, who is determined to make sure nobody finds out, but Godfrey blabs to the rest of the platoon. Frazer, Jones and Walker wonder whether he has been promoted to major, though Walker hopes not, believing that Mainwaring is pompous enough already. When the parade is about to be dismissed, Mainwaring emerges from the office with a rubber tyre on his shoulders, covering up his badge of rank. Walker and Frazer point out that they cannot salute Mainwaring unless they can see his rank. A reluctant Mainwaring is about to reveal the truth, when the Verger comes rushing in, announcing that the Bismarck has been sunk. The platoon cheer and Mainwaring quickly dismisses them, the Navy having "saved his bacon".

The next day, Captain Bailey returns and tells Wilson that Mainwaring has not even been commissioned as a lieutenant, and he must join the ranks. He adds that Wilson will be in charge for the time being. Bailey gives Wilson the news in an envelope and leaves via the main hall so as not to disturb the platoon's drilling. Mainwaring then arrives and opens the letter as Wilson quickly leaves the office. He hears a shot and thinks Mainwaring has committed suicide. He rushes in and is joined by Jones, who explains that it was Godfrey's rifle that fired, and the two of them help a speechless Mainwaring into his chair.

Wilson commands the next parade and admits he will be leading them on the divisional scheme on Sunday. Mainwaring enters, wearing a private's uniform, nobly declaring that the protection of the town must come before pride. The platoon, particularly Jones and Godfrey, are saddened as he joins the ranks. Wilson calls the platoon to attention, but Mainwaring mistimes his drill, while Jones has improved. However, the roles are soon reversed.

Suddenly the pre-arranged Drill Sergeant Gregory turns up and immediately starts barking orders, insulting many members of the platoon. Mainwaring speaks up in their defence but, now as a private, is picked on for speaking out of turn. However, Gregory is soon given a taste of his own medicine when they practise sloping arms; Jones mucks it up, accidentally throwing his rifle on the Drill Sergeant's foot.

At the exercise Wilson does not make a good job of leadership. Jones volunteers to be the scout, but ants climb up his trousers and he has to take them off to get rid of them. Believing this is the signal to advance, the platoon moves forward but soon find themselves in an ambush. It is a disheartened platoon that heads back to Walmington. Sponge remarks there will be no platoon left for the new officer to take charge of. Therefore, the platoon decides to write to GHQ, asking for Mainwaring to be commissioned. In his letter, Walker offers a couple of bottles of scotch "if it will tip the balance". Frazer declines to write with his colleagues, instead writing at home anonymously and asking for promotion himself.

As a result of the letters, Mainwaring is reinstated, and everything is almost back to normal. He and Wilson then muse on the events of the past few days. When Wilson laughs at the fact that Mainwaring had had no authority whatsoever to command the platoon, the latter then shocks Wilson by saying that he, therefore, had had no authority to promote him to sergeant in the first place. Wilson realises what Mainwaring is implying, but the latter plays on the moment by saying that he was sure everything would be sorted out, and then says nonchalantly, "Perhaps you'd like to borrow my penknife" (to remove his sergeant's stripes).

=== Notes ===
- According to the Verger's announcement, the first half of this episode must be set on 27 May 1941.
- When Drill Sergeant Gregory asks Walker why he is not in the army, Walker replies that he "got his ticket" for being allergic to corned beef – a reference to the earlier episode The Loneliness of the Long Distance Walker.

== Cast ==
| Character | TV episode | Audio drama |
|---|---|---|
| Captain Mainwaring | Arthur Lowe | Arthur Lowe |
| Sergeant Wilson | John Le Mesurier | John Le Mesurier |
| Lance Corporal Jones | Clive Dunn | Clive Dunn |
| Private Frazer | John Laurie | John Laurie |
| Private Walker | James Beck | |
| Private Godfrey | Arnold Ridley | Arnold Ridley |
| Private Pike | Ian Lavender | |
| Maurice Yeatman | Edward Sinclair | |
| Captain Bailey | John Ringham | John Ringham |
| Drill Sergeant Gregory | Anthony Sagar | Jack Watson |
| Private Sponge | Colin Bean | |

== Radio version ==
Although changes from the original TV episode were otherwise minor, there is no scene in the radio episode depicting the battle exercise. The platoon did participate in it, though, since Frazer, when commenting about the plunging morale of the platoon on the night Mainwaring absented himself, he remarks bitterly on the fact that "Sergeant Wilson led us straight into an ambush!"

The surname of the character played by guest actor John Ringham was changed from Captain Bailey to Captain Turner, presumably because actor Michael Knowles, who co-adapted the TV episodes for radio with Harold Snoad, made occasional cameo appearances as "Captain Bailey", including in the radio episode, "A Stripe for Frazer".

== Colour restoration of the original television recording ==
The original recording unscrambled (Photo: BBC)

This episode of Dad's Army, after its original broadcast on BBC One in October 1969 and repeat in May 1970, had only survived as a 16 mm black-and-white film telerecording which had been transferred from the original colour videotape before that tape was wiped and reused for reasons of cost. In 2007, James Insell, a preservation specialist at the BBC Archive, established the Colour Recovery Working Group and in 2008, a new technique developed by member Richard Russell was used to restore the episode back to colour.

The technique relies on the fact that some black-and-white film recordings contain the original PAL colour sub-carrier recorded on each film frame as a pattern of fine "chroma dots" and the software is able to decode these back to colour. This process is completely different from the artificial colouring technique that was applied to some black-and-white films during the 1980s – with The Guardian describing the group's new descrambling process as "akin to turning an omelette back into an egg".

After being re-mastered with a high quality audio soundtrack, the resulting restored copy was as close to the episode's master recording as possible and is now kept as the official BBC Archive copy — this was broadcast again in colour for the first time since 1970 on Saturday 13 December 2008 on BBC Two, and has been included in a DVD release called 'The Missing Episodes'.
