= Kinescope =

Early recording process for live television

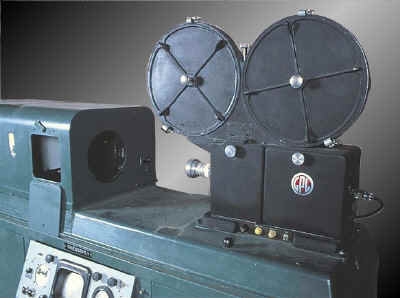
A PA-302 General Precision Laboratories (GPL) kinescope (c.1950–1955). Its movie film camera, bolted to the top of the cabinet, used Kodak optics.

Kinescope /ˈkɪnɪskoʊp/, shortened to kine /ˈkɪni/, also known as telerecording in Britain, is a recording of a television program on motion picture film directly through a lens focused on the screen of a video monitor. The process was pioneered during the 1940s for the preservation, re-broadcasting, and sale of television programs before the introduction of quadruplex videotape, which was released in 1956 and superseded the use of kinescopes for all of these purposes by the 1970s. Kinescopes were the only practical way to preserve live television broadcasts prior to the availability of videotape equipment.

Typically, the term can refer to the process itself, the equipment used for the procedure (a movie camera mounted in front of a video monitor and synchronized to the monitor's scanning rate), or a film made using the process. Film recorders are similar, but record source material from a computer system instead of a television broadcast. A telecine is the inverse device, used to show film directly on television.

The term originally referred to the cathode-ray tube (CRT) used in television receivers, as named by inventor Vladimir K. Zworykin in 1929. Hence, the recordings were known in full as kinescope films or kinescope recordings. RCA was granted a trademark for the term (for its CRT) in 1932; it voluntarily released the term to the public domain in 1950.

== History ==
The General Electric laboratories in Schenectady, New York, experimented with making still and motion picture records of television images in 1931.

There is anecdotal evidence that the BBC experimented with filming the output of the television monitor before its television service was suspended in 1939 due to the outbreak of World War II. A BBC executive, Cecil Madden, recalled filming a production of The Scarlet Pimpernel in this way, only for film director Alexander Korda to order the burning of the negative as he owned the film rights to the book, which he felt had been infringed. While there is no written record of any BBC Television production of The Scarlet Pimpernel during 1936–1939, the incident is dramatized in Jack Rosenthal's 1986 television play The Fools on the Hill.

Some of the surviving live transmissions of the Nazi German television station Fernsehsender Paul Nipkow, dating as far back as the 1930s, were recorded by pointing a 35 mm camera to a receiver's screen; although, most surviving Nazi live television programs, such as the 1936 Summer Olympics (not to be confused with the cinematic footage made during the same event by Leni Riefenstahl for her film Olympia), a number of Nuremberg Rallies, or official state visits (such as Benito Mussolini's), were shot directly on 35 mm instead and transmitted over the air as a television signal, with only two minutes' delay from the original event, by means of the so-called Zwischenfilmverfahren (see intermediate film system) from an early outside broadcast van on the site.

According to a 1949 film produced by RCA, silent films had been made of early experimental telecasts during the 1930s. The films were produced by aiming a camera at television monitors, at a speed of eight frames per second, resulting in somewhat jerky reproductions of the images. By the mid-1940s, RCA and NBC were refining the filming process and including sound; the images were less jerky but still somewhat fuzzy.

By early 1946, television cameras were being attached to American guided missiles to aid in their remote steering. Films were made of the television images they transmitted for further evaluation of the target and the missile's performance.

The first known surviving example of the telerecording process in Britain is from October 1947, showing the singer Adelaide Hall performing at the RadiOlympia event. Hall sings "Chi-Baba, Chi-Baba (My Bambino Go to Sleep)" and "I Can't Give You Anything But Love", as well as accompanying herself on ukulele and dancing. When the show was originally broadcast on BBC TV it was 60 minutes in length and also included performances from Winifred Atwell, Evelyn Dove, Cyril Blake and his Calypso Band, Edric Connor and Mable Lee, and was produced by Eric Fawcett. The six-minute footage of Miss Hall is all that survives of the show.

From the following month, the wedding of Princess Elizabeth and Philip Mountbatten also survives, as do various early 1950s productions such as It is Midnight, Dr Schweitzer, The Lady from the Sea and the opening two episodes of The Quatermass Experiment, although in varying degrees of quality. A complete 7-hour set of telerecordings of Queen Elizabeth II's 1953 coronation also exists.

The first near-instant replay of a sporting event occurred in 1955 during a Hockey Night in Canada broadcast on CBC Television, using a kinescope to replay a goal scored, mere minutes after had been broadcast live.

=== Worldwide program distribution ===
In the era before satellite communications, kinescopes were used to distribute live events such as a royal wedding as quickly as possible to other countries of the Commonwealth that had started a television service. A Royal Air Force aircraft would fly the telerecording from the UK to Canada, where it would be broadcast over the whole North American network.

Prior to the introduction of videotape in 1956, kinescopes were the only way to record television broadcasts, or to distribute network television programs that were broadcast live from originating cities to stations not connected to the network, or to stations that wished to show a program at a time different than the network broadcast. Although the quality was less than desirable, television programs of all types, from prestigious dramas to regular news shows, were handled in this manner.

Even after the introduction of videotape, the BBC and the ITV companies made black and white kinescopes of selected programs for international sales and continued to do so until the early 1970s, by which time programs were being videotaped in color. Most, if not all, recordings from the 405-line era have long since been lost as have many from the introduction of 625-line video to the early days of color. Consequently, the majority of British shows that still exist before the introduction of color, and a number thereafter, do so in the form of these telerecordings. A handful of shows, including some episodes of Doctor Who and most of the first series of Adam Adamant Lives!, were deliberately telerecorded for ease of editing rather than being videotaped.

=== Eastman Television Recording Camera ===
In September 1947, Eastman Kodak introduced the Eastman Television Recording Camera, in cooperation with DuMont Laboratories and NBC, for recording images from a television screen under the trademark "Kinephoto". NBC, CBS, and DuMont set up their main kinescope recording facilities in New York City, while ABC chose Chicago. By 1951, NBC and CBS were each shipping out some 1,000 16 mm kinescope prints each week to their affiliates across the United States, and by 1955 that number had increased to 2,500 per week for CBS. By 1954, the television industry's film consumption surpassed that of all of the Hollywood studios combined.

=== Hot kinescope ===
After the network of coaxial cable and microwave relays carrying programs to the West Coast was completed in September 1951, CBS and NBC instituted a hot kinescope process in 1952, where shows being performed in New York were transmitted west, filmed on two kinescope machines in 35 mm negative and 16 mm reversal film (the latter for backup protection) in Los Angeles, rushed to film processing, and then transmitted from Los Angeles three hours later for broadcast in the Pacific Time Zone. In September 1956, NBC began making color hot kines of some of its color programs using a lenticular film process which, unlike color negative film, could be processed rapidly using standard black-and-white methods. They were called hot kines because the film reels being delivered from the lab were still warm from the developing process.

=== Double system editing ===
Even after the introduction of quadruplex videotape machines in 1956 removed the need for hot kines, the television networks continued to use kinescopes in the double system method of videotape editing. It was impossible to slow or freeze frame a videotape at that time, so the unedited tape would be copied to a kinescope and edited conventionally. The edited kinescope print was then used to conform the videotape master. More than 300 videotaped network series and specials used this method over a 12-year period, including the fast-paced Rowan & Martin's Laugh-In.

== Alternatives to kinescoping ==
With the variable quality of kinescopes, networks looked towards alternative methods to replace them with a higher degree of quality.

=== Change to 35 mm film broadcasts ===
Programs originally shot with film cameras (as opposed to kinescopes) were also used in television's early years, although they were generally considered inferior to the big-production live programs because of their lower budgets and loss of immediacy.

In 1951, the stars and producers of the Hollywood-based television series I Love Lucy, Desi Arnaz and Lucille Ball, decided to film the show directly onto 35 mm film using the three-camera system, instead of broadcasting it live. Normally, a live program originating from Los Angeles would be performed live in the late afternoon for the Eastern Time Zone and seen on a kinescope three hours later in the Pacific Time Zone. But as an article in American Cinematographer explained,

In the beginning there was a very definite reason for the decision of Desilu Productions to put I Love Lucy on film instead of doing it live and having kinescope recordings carry it to affiliate outlets of the network. The company was not satisfied with the quality of kinescopes. It saw that film, produced especially for television, was the only means of ensuring top quality pictures on the home receiver as well as ensuring a flawless show.

The I Love Lucy decision introduced reruns to most of the American television audience, and set a pattern for the syndication of TV shows after their network runs.

=== Electronicam ===
The program director of the DuMont Television Network, James L. Caddigan, devised an alternative – the Electronicam. In this, all the studio TV cameras had built-in 35 mm film cameras which shared the same optical path. An Electronicam technician threw switches to mark the film footage electronically, identifying the camera takes called by the director. The corresponding film segments from the various cameras then were combined by a film editor to duplicate the live program. The "Classic 39" syndicated episodes of The Honeymooners were filmed using Electronicam (as well as the daily five-minute syndicated series Les Paul & Mary Ford At Home in 1954–55), but with the introduction of a practical videotape recorder only one year away, the Electronicam system never saw widespread use. The DuMont network did not survive into the era of videotape, and in order to gain clearances for its programs, was heavily dependent on kinescopes, which it called Teletranscriptions.

=== Electronovision ===
Attempts were made for many years to take television images, convert them to film via kinescope, then project them in theatres for paying audiences. In the mid-1960s, Producer/entrepreneur H. William "Bill" Sargent, Jr. used conventional analog Image Orthicon video camera tube units, shooting in the B&W 819-line interlaced 25fps French video standard, using modified high-band quadruplex VTRs to record the signal. The promoters of Electronovision (not to be confused with Electronicam) gave the impression that this was a new system created from scratch, using a high-tech name (and avoiding the word kinescope) to distinguish the process from conventional film photography. Nonetheless, the advances in picture quality were, at the time, a major step ahead. By capturing more than 800 lines of resolution at 25 frame/s, raw tape could be converted to film via kinescope recording with sufficient enhanced resolution to allow big-screen enlargement. The 1960s productions used Marconi image orthicon video cameras, which have a characteristic white glow around black objects (and a corresponding black glow around white objects), which was a defect of the pick-up. Later, vidicon and plumbicon video camera tubes produced much cleaner, more accurate pictures.

=== Videotape ===
In 1951, singer Bing Crosby’s company Bing Crosby Enterprises made the first experimental magnetic video recordings; however, the poor picture quality and very high tape speed meant it would be impractical to use. In 1956, Ampex introduced the first commercial Quadruplex videotape recorder, followed in 1958 by a colour model. Offering high quality and instant playback at a much lower cost, Quadruplex tape quickly replaced kinescope as the primary means of recording television broadcasts.

== Decline ==
In the late 1960s, U.S. television networks continued to make kinescopes of their daytime dramas available, many of which still aired live during that time period, for their smaller network affiliates that did not yet have videotape capability but wished to time-shift the network programming. Some of these programs aired up to two weeks after their original dates, particularly in Alaska and Hawaii. Many episodes of programs from the 1960s survive only through kinescoped copies.

In Australia, kinescopes were still being made of some evening news programs as late as 1977, if they were recorded at all. A recording of a 1975 episode of Australian series This Day Tonight is listed on the National Archives of Australia website as a kinescope, while surviving episodes of the 1978 drama series The Truckies also exist as kinescopes, indicating that the technology was still being used by the ABC at that point.

Until the early 1960s, much of the BBC's output, and British television in general, was broadcast live, and entire drama productions were performed live for a second time until recording methods improved. Eventually, telerecordings would be used to preserve a program for repeat showings. In the UK, telerecordings continued to be made after the introduction of commercial broadcast videotape in 1958, as they possessed several distinct advantages. Firstly, they were easier to transport and more durable than videotape. Secondly, they could be used in any country regardless of the television broadcasting standard, which was not true of videotape. Later, the system could be used to make black-and-white copies of color programs for sale to television stations that were not yet broadcasting in color.

The system was largely used for black-and-white reproduction. Although some color telerecordings were made, they were generally in the minority as by the time color programs were widely needed for sale, video standards conversion was easier and higher quality and the price of videotape had become much reduced. Before videotape became the exclusive recording format during the early to mid-1980s, any (color) video recordings used in documentaries or filmed program inserts were usually transferred onto film.

In the 1950s a home telerecording kit was introduced in Britain, allowing enthusiasts to make 16 mm film recordings of television programs. The major drawback, apart from the short duration of a 16 mm film magazine, was that a large opaque frame had to be placed in front of the TV set in order to block out any stray reflections, making it impossible to watch the set normally while filming. It is not known if any recordings made using this equipment still exist.

British broadcasters used telerecordings for domestic purposes well into the 1960s, with 35 mm film usually used as it produced a higher quality result. For overseas sales, 16 mm film would be used, as it was cheaper. Although domestic use of telerecording in the UK for repeat broadcasts dropped off sharply after the move to colour in the late 1960s, 16 mm black and white film telerecordings were still being offered for sale by British broadcasters well into the 1970s.

Telerecording was still being used internally at the BBC in the 1980s too, to preserve copies for posterity of programs that were not necessarily of the highest importance, but which nonetheless their producers wanted to be preserved. If there were no videotape machines available on a given day, then a telerecording would be made. There is evidence to suggest that the children's magazine program Blue Peter was occasionally telerecorded as late as 1985. After this point, however, cheap domestic videotape formats such as VHS could more easily be used to keep a backup reference copy of a program.

Another occasional use of telerecording into the late 1980s was by documentary makers working in 16 mm film who wished to include a videotape-sourced excerpt in their work, although such use was again rare.

In other territories, film telerecordings stopped being produced after the introduction of videotape. In Czechoslovakia, the first videotape recorders (Machtronics MVR-15) were introduced in 1966 but were soon replaced by the Ampex 2" Quadruplex in 1967. Most of the programs, like TV dramas, were recorded on video, but only a few programs continued to be telerecorded onto 16 mm film. The last known telerecording was produced in 1971, and soon after, all programs were recorded on video only.

== Legacy ==
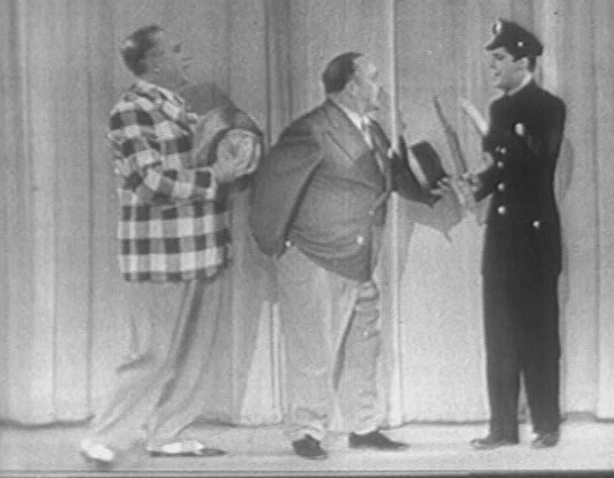
Screenshot from 1949 kinescope

Kinescopes were intended to be used for immediate rebroadcast, or for an occasional repeat of a program; thus, only a small fraction of kinescope recordings remain today. Many television shows are represented by only a handful of episodes, such as with the early television work of comedian Ernie Kovacs, and the original version of Jeopardy! hosted by Art Fleming.

Another purpose of Kinescopes involved satisfying show sponsors. Kinescopes sometimes would be sent to the advertising agency for the sponsor of a show so that the ad agency could determine whether or not the sponsor's ads appeared properly. Due to this practice, some kinescopes have actually been discovered in the storage areas of some of these older advertising agencies or in the storage areas of the program sponsors themselves.

=== In the United States ===
Certain performers or production companies would require that a kinescope be made of every television program. Such is the case with performers Jackie Gleason and Milton Berle, for whom nearly complete program archives exist. As Jackie Gleason's program was broadcast live in New York, the show was kinescoped for later rebroadcast for the West Coast. Per his contract, he would receive one copy of each broadcast, which he kept in his vault, and only released them to the public (on home video) shortly before his death in 1987.

Milton Berle sued NBC late in his life, believing the kinescopes of a major portion of his programs were lost. However, the programs were later found in a warehouse in Los Angeles.

Mark Goodson-Bill Todman Productions, the producers of such TV game shows as What's My Line?, had a significant portion of their output recorded on both videotape and kinescopes. These programs are rebroadcast by current-day game show channels, including Buzzr and Game Show Network.

All of the NBC Symphony Orchestra telecasts with Arturo Toscanini, from 1948 to 1952, were preserved on kinescopes and later released on VHS and LaserDisc by RCA and on DVD by Testament. The original audio from the kinescopes, however, was replaced with high fidelity sound that had been recorded simultaneously either on transcription discs or magnetic tape.

In the mid-1990s, Edie Adams, wife of Ernie Kovacs, claimed that so little value was given to the kinescope recordings of the DuMont Television Network that after the network folded in 1956 its entire archive was dumped into Upper New York Bay. Today, however, efforts are made to preserve the few surviving DuMont kinescopes, with the UCLA Film and Television Archive having collected over 300 for preservation.

In September 2010, a kinescope of Game 7 of the 1960 World Series was found in the wine cellar of Bing Crosby. The game was thought lost forever but was preserved due to Crosby's superstition about watching the game live. The film was digitally transferred by Major League Baseball, and then presented by MLB Network before the 2011 season.

=== In Australia ===
Early Australian television drama series were recorded as kinescopes, such as Autumn Affair and Emergency, along with variety series like The Lorrae Desmond Show. Kinescopes continued to be made after videotape was introduced to Australia; most existing episodes of the 1965–1967 children's series Magic Circle Club are kinescopes (per listings for episodes on the National Film and Sound Archive website)

=== In Britain ===
Telerecordings form an important part of British television heritage, preserving what would otherwise have been lost. Nearly every pre-1960s British television program in the archives is in the form of a telerecording, along with the vast majority of existing 1960s output. Videotape was expensive and could be wiped and re-used; film was cheaper, smaller, and in practice more durable. Only a very small proportion of British television from the black-and-white era survives at all.

As the BBC has taken stock of the large gaps in its archive and sought to recover as much of the missing material as possible, many recovered programs have been returned from the 1980s onwards as telerecordings held by foreign broadcasters or private film collectors. Many of these surviving telerecorded programs, such as episodes of Doctor Who, Steptoe and Son and Till Death Us Do Part continue to be transmitted on satellite television stations such as UKTV Gold, and many such programs have been released on VHS and DVD.

In 2008, the BBC undertook color recovery work on the existing 16 mm monochrome telerecording of Room at the Bottom, a 1969 episode of the sitcom Dad's Army. Although this episode was originally produced and broadcast in color, the black and white film was the only surviving copy of the episode following the wiping of the original videotape. However, the telerecording process left color information in the form of chroma dots in the frames of the film; using a specially designed computer program, these chroma dots were used to bring out the original color information, which was then applied to the film, allowing the color to be restored to the episode. The restored version of Room at the Bottom was broadcast on 13 December 2008, the first time it had been seen in color since May 1970.

== Technology ==
NTSC television images are scanned at roughly 60 Hz, with two interlaced fields per frame, displayed at 30 frames per second.

A kinescope must be able to convert the 30 frame/s image to 24 frame/s, the standard sound speed of film cameras, and do so in a way so that the image is clear enough to then be re-broadcast by means of a film chain back to 30 frame/s.

In kinescoping an NTSC signal, 525 lines are broadcast in one frame. A 35 mm or 16 mm camera exposes one frame of film for every one frame of television (525 lines), and moving a new frame of film into place during the time equivalent of one field of television (131.25 lines). In the British 405-line television system, the French 819-line television system and the greater European 625-line television system, television ran at 25 frames—or more correctly, 50 fields—per second, so the film camera would also be run at 25 frames per second rather than the cinematic film standard of 24 frames.

Therefore, in order to maintain successful kinescope photography, a camera must expose one frame of film for exactly 1/30th or 1/25th of a second, the time in which one frame of video is transmitted, and move to another frame of film within the small interval of 1/120th of a second.

In some instances, this was accomplished through means of an electronic shutter, which cuts off the TV image at the end of every set of visible lines. Most US kinescope equipment, however, utilized a mechanical shutter, revolving at 24 revolutions per second. This shutter had a closed angle of 72° and an open angle of 288°, yielding the necessary closed time of 1/120th of a second and open time 1/30th of a second. Using this shutter, in 1 second of video (60 fields equaling 30 frames), 48 television fields (totaling 24 frames of video) would be captured on 24 frames of film, and 12 additional fields would be omitted as the shutter closed and the film advanced.

Analog television is a field-based system, and most electronic video recording solutions retain both fields of every frame, preserving the temporal resolution of interlaced video. Some early consumer-grade videotape recorders preserved only one field of each frame. Film, being a frame-based system, can retain full information from interlaced video by converting every field into a frame, but the required frame rate had been deemed impractical. Various solutions to the mapping problem have been developed, resulting in successive improvements to the quality of the image at the traditional 24 fps frame rate. Nevertheless, video converted to film loses the fluid look of interlaced video, taking on a look somewhat similar to film.

=== Shutter bar and banding problems ===
The 72°/288° shutter and the systematic loss of 12 fields per second were not without side effects. In going from 30 frame/s to 24 frame/s, the camera photographed part of some fields. The juncture on the film frame where these part-fields meet is called a splice.

If the timing is accurate, the splice is invisible. However, if the camera and television are out of phase, a phenomenon known as shutter bar or banding occurs. If the shutter is slow in closing, overexposure results where the partial fields join and the shutter bar takes the form of a white line. If the shutter closes too soon, underexposure takes place, and the line is black. The term banding refers to the phenomenon occurring on the screen as two bars.

=== Suppressed field ===
A simpler system, less prone to breakdown, was to suppress one of the two fields in displaying the television picture. This left the time during which the second field would have been displayed for the film camera to advance the film by one frame, which proved sufficient. This method was called skip field recording.

The method had several disadvantages. In missing every other field of video, half the information of the picture was lost on such recordings. The resulting film thus consisted of fewer than 200 lines of picture information and as a result, the line structure was very apparent. The missing field information also made movement look jerky.

=== Stored field ===
A successful improvement on the suppressed field system was to display the image from one of the fields at a much higher intensity on the television screen during the time when the film gate was closed, and then capture the image as the second field was being displayed. By adjusting the intensity of the first field, it was possible to arrange it so that the luminosity of the phosphor had decayed to exactly match that of the second field, so that the two appeared to be at the same level and the film camera captured both.

Another technique developed by the BBC, known as spot wobble, involved the addition of an extremely high frequency but low voltage sine wave to the vertical deflection plate of the television screen, which changed the moving 'spot' - a circular beam of electrons by which the television picture was displayed - into an elongated oval. While this made the image slightly blurred, it removed the visible line structure (by causing adjacent lines to touch, so that no separating band of darkness lay between them) and thereby resulted in a better image. It also prevented moiré pattern from appearing when the resulting film was re-broadcast on television, which occurred if the line structure on the film recording did not precisely match the scanning lines of the electronic film scanner.

=== Moye-Mechau film recording ===
The Mechau system used a synchronized rotating mirror to display each frame of a film in sequence without the need for a gate. When reversed, a high-quality television monitor was set up in place of the projection screen, and unexposed film stock is run through at the point where the lamp would have been illuminating the film.

This procedure had the advantage of capturing both fields of the frame on a film, but required significant attention to produce quality results. The Mechau film magazine only held enough for nine minutes so two recorders were needed to run in sequence in order to record anything longer.

=== Lenses ===
Lenses did not need a great depth of field but had to be capable of both producing a very sharp image with high resolution of a flat surface and of doing so at high speed. In order to minimize light fall-off on the perimeter of the lens, a coated lens was preferable. 40 mm or 50 mm lenses were usually used with 16 mm in calibrated mounts. Focus was checked by examining a print under a microscope.

=== Sound recording ===
The camera could be equipped with sound recording to place the soundtrack and picture on the same film for single-system sound recording. More commonly, the alternative double system, whereby the soundtrack was recorded on an optical recorder or magnetic dubber in sync with the camera, yielded a better quality soundtrack and facilitated editing.

=== Kinescope image ===
Kinescope CRTs intended for photographic use were coated with phosphors rich in blue and ultraviolet radiation. This permitted the use of positive type emulsions for photographing in spite of their slow film speeds. The brightness range of kinescope CRTs was about 1 to 30.

Kinescope images were capable of great flexibility. The operator could make the CRT image brighter or darker, adjust contrast, width and height, rotate left, right or upside down, and positive or negative image.

Since kinescope CRTs were able to produce a negative image, direct positive recordings could be made by simply photographing the negative image on the kinescope CRT. When making a negative film, in order for final prints to be in the correct emulsion position, the direction of the image was reversed on the television. This applied only when double system sound was used.

=== Film stock used ===
For kinescopes, 16 mm film was the common choice by most studios because of the lower cost of stock and film processing, but in the larger network markets, it was not uncommon to see 35 mm kinescopes, particularly for national rebroadcast. Fine-grain positive stock was most commonly used because of its low cost and high resolution.

=== Common issues ===
Videotape engineer Frederick M. Remley wrote of kinescope recordings:

Because of the many variables in the combined electronic/photographic process, the quality of such recordings often leaves much to be desired. Defects often encountered in photographic recording include relatively poor image resolution; a compressed brightness range often limited by kinescope display technology to a brightness ratio of about 40:1; nonlinearity of recordings, as exemplified by lack of gradation in both the near-white and near-black portions of the reproduced pictures; and excessive image noise due to film grain and video processing artifacts. The final signal-to-noise ratio is often less than 40 dB, especially in the case of 16 mm film.

Because each field is sequential in time to the next, a kinescope film frame that captured two interlaced fields at once often showed a ghostly fringe around the edges of moving objects, an artifact not as visible when watching television directly at 50 or 60 fields per second.

Some kinescopes filmed the television pictures at the television frame rate - 30 full frames per second for American System M broadcasts and 25 full frames per second for European System B broadcasts, resulting in more faithful picture quality than those that recorded at 24 frames per second. The standard was later changed to 59.94 fields/s or 29.97 frame/s for System M broadcasts, due to the technical requirements of color TV. Since these reasons did not affect System B, the color TV framerate in Europe remained at 25 frames/s. (Note: If electrical interference was present in the old 30 frame/s, 60 fields/s black-and-white System M format, a shutter bar would appear horizontally across the screen and not move due to U.S. electrical standards having the same frequency (60 Hertz) as the fields refresh rate in the picture. When color TV was standardized, the frame rate was shifted to 29.97 and the field rate shifted to 59.94 to allow a frequency shift not only to introduce the luminance/chrominance delay needed to share the information on the screen, but also to move the hum bar from a stationary position. As System B ran on 25 frame/s, 50 fields/s in black-and-white (to accommodate the 50 Hertz electrical frequency used in Europe), and had a wider bandwidth per channel, this issue was rendered moot.)

In the era of early color TV, the chroma information included in the video signal filmed could cause visible artifacts. It was possible to filter the chroma out, but this was not always done. Consequently, the color information was included (but not in color) in the black-and-white film image. Using modern computing techniques, the color may now be recovered, a process known as color recovery.

Because videotape records at fifty interlaced fields per second and telerecordings at twenty-five progressive frames per second, videotaped programs that exist now only as telerecordings have lost their characteristic live video look and the motion now looks filmic. One solution to this problem is VidFIRE, an electronic process to restore video-type motion.

== See also ==
- Intermittent mechanism
