= Are You Being Served? (disambiguation) =

Are You Being Served? is a British sitcom by Jeremy Lloyd and David Croft which ran on BBC One from 1973 to 1985.

Are You Being Served? may also refer to:

- 2016 reboot of the British sitcom
- Are You Being Served? (film), a 1977 film based on the television series
- Are You Being Served? (Australian TV series), an Australian version of the British TV series which ran on Network Ten between 1980 and 1981
- Are You Being Served? Again!, the American and Canadian name for Grace & Favour, a spin-off of Are You Being Served?
- "Are You Being Served?", the title of an episode of the American sitcom Frasier, unrelated to the British series
