= Arthur Brough =

British actor (1905–1978)

- Brough as Mr. Grainger in Are You Being Served?
- Born: Frederick Arthur Baker; 26 February 1905; Petersfield, Hampshire, England
- Died: 28 May 1978 (aged 73); Folkestone, Kent, England
- Years active: 1925–1978
- Television: Mr. Grainger in Are You Being Served?
- Spouse: Elizabeth Addeyman (m. 1929; died 1978)
- Children: Joanna Hutton

Arthur Brough (born Frederick Arthur Baker; 26 February 1905 – 28 May 1978) was a British actor, theatre founder, producer, and director. He is best known for portraying the bumbling senior menswear salesman Ernest Grainger on the BBC TV sitcom Are You Being Served?.

== Biography ==
=== Early life ===
Brough originally aspired to become a teacher but was unable to secure employment in the field and instead worked in a solicitor's office. Developing an interest in acting, Brough attended the Royal Academy of Dramatic Art (RADA), graduating in 1928. He subsequently joined a Shakespearean theatrical troupe, where he met his future wife, actress Elizabeth Addeyman. After marrying in 1929, they used their wedding dowry as collateral to rent the Leas Pavilion, a repertory theatre in Folkestone, Kent. The couple had one daughter, Joanna.

== Theatre impresario ==
Having used the name The Pioneer Players in Folkestone since 1929, Brough and his wife, Elizabeth, formed The Arthur Brough Players in 1932. Once the Folkestone repertory company was established, Brough went on to form new repertory companies in Bradford, Bristol, Blackpool, Keighley, Leeds, Lincoln, Oxford and Southampton.

With the outbreak of World War II, Brough enlisted in the Royal Navy, where he served for the duration of the war. His service included assisting with the evacuation of Dunkirk in 1940, with his ship returning to the rescue scene multiple times to evacuate soldiers before the Nazis reached the seaport.

Following demobilisation, Brough resumed his acting career and reopened the Folkestone repertory theatre. Many prominent actors began their careers with The Arthur Brough Players, including Peter Barkworth, who appeared in The Guinea Pig in 1948; Eric Lander, later a star of the TV series No Hiding Place, in 1949; Polly James in the early 1960s; and Anne Stallybrass, who started as an assistant stage manager in 1960 and went on to play Ida the maid in Pool's Paradise by Philip King. She also appeared in The Aspern Papers, Candida, and A Taste of Honey at the small Folkestone theatre. Other notable alumni included Andrew Jack; Sydney Sturgess, who later married Barry Morse; and Trevor Bannister, who would eventually act alongside Brough in Are You Being Served?

At that time, local repertory companies would present a new play each week to compete with cinemas. A small, permanent cast would rehearse one play during the day while performing the previous week's production each evening, with a mid-week matinee. Due to economic constraints, the limited number of actors often meant performers had to portray characters far removed from their own age or appearance.

Brough also took his company on tour and helped establish repertory companies in Aldershot, Southend and Eastbourne.

== Television ==
With the rise of television, Brough predicted the decline of repertory theatre as a viable entertainment form. In the 1960s, he began seeking roles in the mass media, appearing in small roles in both films and television. His daughter, Joanna Hutton, commented on his forecast regarding the decline of repertory theatre: "He was very astute and unsentimental about it. He realized the era was over and that he must diversify." According to Hutton, her father initially struggled with the transition from stage to screen. "He realized how hammy he was. He used to take the mickey out of himself; he'd always acted in a Shakespearean manner and suddenly realized he had to tone down his performance for film."

One of the first roles Brough took away from the stage was in the film The Green Man (1956) with Alastair Sim, in which he played the landlord of the eponymous hotel. He also had a minor role opposite Jayne Mansfield in The Challenge (1960), and made guest appearances in TV shows such as Upstairs, Downstairs, Dad's Army, Z-Cars, The Persuaders, Adam Adamant Lives!, Randall and Hopkirk (Deceased), and Jason King. He also continued to appear in theatrical productions, including Half a Sixpence, where he played a shopkeeper. The Folkestone Rep continued until 1969 before closing when Brough's wife Elizabeth began to suffer from ill health.

=== Are You Being Served? ===
In 1972, Brough was cast as Mr Ernest Grainger in the BBC sitcom Are You Being Served? by Jeremy Lloyd and David Croft, which is the role he is most remembered for today. Initially aired as a pilot episode in the Comedy Playhouse slot, it was well received and commissioned for a series in early 1973. Set in a fading fictional department store, Brough played the senior menswear salesman alongside his assistants Mr Humphries (John Inman) and Mr Lucas (Trevor Bannister). The show ran until 1985.

After the show completed its fifth series in 1977, Brough's wife of almost 50 years, Elizabeth, died on 22 March 1978. Devastated by her death, Brough announced that he was quitting acting. He stayed with his daughter for a few weeks following his wife’s death, and according to his daughter, Jeremy Lloyd and David Croft made contact to inform him that they were writing him into the next series. However, Brough died just two months later, on 28 May 1978, in Folkestone. Croft decided not to have another actor take over the role of Mr Grainger, so his character in Are You Being Served? was replaced by Mr Tebbs, played by James Hayter.

=== Related family life ===
Brough's daughter, Joanna Hutton (who died in 2002), became the first female curator of the Brontë Parsonage Museum in Haworth during the 1960s.

== Credits ==
Arthur Brough dedicated his life to the theatre, and his Are You Being Served? co-star Mollie Sugden credited him with helping train a generation of actors. His colleagues had fond memories of working with Brough, who, as his daughter noted, "was a highly respected actor who'd spent forty years in the profession." At the time of his death, David Croft said: "Arthur created a living character who was the inspiration for much of the humour. His personality made him a pivot round which a whole lot of laughter and affection revolved."

With a mischievous sense of humour, he would often pull pranks on the rest of the cast during recordings. Despite this, however, Trevor Bannister held him in very high regard, saying of him that he was a "wicked old man but a wonderful man." David Croft recalls how Brough would disappear from the set: "Whenever we were rehearsing, he'd vanish at about three minutes to eleven. For a while, we wondered where he went, but eventually discovered that he'd nip next door to the pub for a quick pink gin. We'd watch from the window as this little figure hurled towards the pub – we never spoke to him about it. One day, when he returned, John Inman asked where he'd been. He made some excuse, but what he'd forgotten was that it was pouring with rain, and his bald head was soaking wet!"

== Filmography ==
=== Film ===
| Year | Title | Role | Notes |
|---|---|---|---|
| 1956 | The Green Man | Landlord | |
| 1959 | The Night We Dropped a Clanger | Admiral Bewdly | |
| 1960 | The Challenge | Landlord | |
| 1961 | The Singer Not the Song | Burning haystacks Farmer | Uncredited |
| 1965 | Dead Man's Chest | Groves | |
| 1975 | Royal Flash | King Ludwig of Bavaria | |
| 1977 | Are You Being Served? | Mr Grainger | (final film role) |

=== Television ===
| Year | Title | Role | Notes |
|---|---|---|---|
| 1957 | Kenilworth | Giles Gosling, Black Bear landlord | 1 episode |
| 1960 | Campion | Inspector Oates | Series 2: "Death of a Ghost" |
| 1960 | No Hiding Place | Dr. Shepherd | Episode: "The Missing Moorhen" |
| 1960 | Barnaby Rudge | John Willet | 8 episodes |
| 1961 | Jango | Taffe | Episode: "The Bumbling Burglar" |
| 1961 | Deadline Midnight | Billy Bloor | Episode: "Pen of Venom" |
| 1966 | Adam Adamant Lives! | Mr. Percy | Episode: "The Terribly Happy Embalmers" |
| 1967-1968 | Champion House | Reg Hapsley | 4 episodes |
| 1968 | Public Eye | Rowan | Episode: "Have Mud, Will Throw" |
| 1969 | The Main Chance | County Court Judge | Episode: "Liar's Dice" |
| 1969 | Randall and Hopkirk (Deceased) | Snowy | Episode: "That's How Murder Snowballs" |
| 1970 | Parkin's Patch | Tom Marsh | Episode: "Low Noon" |
| 1970 | His and Hers | Mr. Ridley | Episode: "Anniversary" |
| 1970 | The Adventures of Don Quick | Odin | Episode: "The Quick and the Dead" |
| 1970 | Dad's Army | Mr. Boyle | Episode: "A. Wilson (Manager)?" |
| 1970 | The Roads to Freedom | Old Man | 1 episode |
| 1970 | Doomwatch | Sandy Larch | Episode: "Invasion" |
| 1971 | Kindly Leave the Kerb | Actor | Episode: "The Collection" |
