= Are You Being Served? (Australian TV series) =

- Created by: Jeremy Lloyd and David Croft
- Written by: Jim Burnett
- Directed by: Bob Spiers
- Starring: John Inman; June Bronhill; Reg Gillam; Basil Clarke; Peter Collingwood; Anthony Bazell; Judith Woodroffe; Reg Evans; Shane Bourne; Ken Fraser; Christine Amor
- Opening theme: "Are You Being Served Sir?" (Jeremy Lloyd, Penny Croft)
- Country of origin: Australia
- No. of series: 2
- No. of episodes: 16

Production
- Running time: 25 minutes
- Production companies: Lyle McCabe Productions; McCabe / Paradine Productions

Original release
- Network: Network 10
- Release: June 16, 1980 – October 28, 1981

Related
- Are You Being Served? (UK); Are You Being Served? (film); Beane's of Boston; Grace & Favour

Are You Being Served? is an Australian sitcom that is based on the British sitcom of the same name; it was produced by Network 10. A total of 16 episodes were produced in two series, which aired in 1980 and 1981. The draw-card was the presence of actor John Inman reprising his role of Mr. Humphries from the original series. The other characters were all directly based on the regular characters in the show's original British version, but were all given new names, hence there were no other returning original actors.

In comparison to the original series, Inman described this version of the series as "tighter - there's less padding". For the opening theme, Inman himself performed vocals.

== Premise ==
Audio samples of Are You Being Served? (media help)

Theme Song for Are You Being Served?

Mr. Humphries (Inman) is sent to Australia by Mr. Grace to work temporarily for his Australian cousin Mr. Bone at Bone Brothers. Apart from the new setting and Australian rather than British characters, the characters and situation are almost identical to that of the original series, as are the set design and layout and even the costuming (down to the senior sales woman's ever-changing hair colours). Menswear and ladies apparel share a floor of a large city department store and the departments come into regular conflict. The staff on the floor are the pompous floor-walker Captain Wagstaff (Reg Gillam), crusty senior salesman Mr. Mankowitz (Anthony Bazell), randy sales junior Mr. Randel (Shane Bourne), strident older sales woman Mrs. Crawford (June Bronhill) and attractive but brassy and common younger sales woman Miss Buxton (Judith Woodroffe). Basil Clarke portrays the store's owner Mr. Bone, Reg Evans is the obnoxious cleaner Mr. Cocker, Kerry Daniel plays the nurse, and Tracey Kelly is Bone's attractive secretary.

== Cast ==
- John Inman as Mr. Humphries
- June Bronhill as Mrs. Crawford
- Reg Gillam as Captain Wagstaff
- Judith Woodroffe as Miss Buxton
- Christine Amor as Miss Nicholls
- Tony Bazell as Mr. Mankowitz
- Shane Bourne as Mr. Randel
- Peter Collingwood as Mr. Dunkley
- Ken Fraser as Mr. Fenwick
- Basil Clarke as Young Mr. Bone
- Reg Evans as Mr. Cocker
- Kerry Daniel as Young Mr. Bone's Nurse
- Tracey Kelly as Young Mr. Bone's Secretary
- Bernadette Gibson as the Canteen Manageress
- Maurie Fields as Harry Collins (1 episode)

Both Judith Woodroffe (Miss Buxton) and Peter Collingwood (Mr. Dunkley) were unavailable for series two so they were replaced with Miss Nicholls (Christine Amor) and Mr. Fenwick (Ken Fraser) respectively.

=== Character similarities with the original series ===
- Mrs. Crawford = Mrs. Slocombe
- Captain Wagstaff = Captain Peacock
- Miss Buxton/Miss Nicholls = Miss Brahms
- Mr. Mankowitz = Mr. Grainger (with some characteristics of Mr. Goldberg)
- Mr. Randel = Mr. Lucas/Mr. Spooner
- Mr. Dunkley/Mr. Fenwick = Mr. Rumbold
- Young Mr. Bone = Young Mr. Grace
- Mr. Cocker = Mr. Mash

== Production notes ==
The first series was produced at the ATV-10 studios in Melbourne in the early months of 1980.

It was the first television role for opera singer June Bronhill. (Her first straight dramatic acting role had been in a theatre production the previous year.) John Inman said, "It's amazing to think this is her first television role, she's a natural." Bronhill discussed the role with TV Week magazine. "I'm delighted with the way my character has turned out. Mrs. Crawford tries to be very refined but sometimes the ocker in her slips out. The British version of Are You Being Served? has always been my favourite comedy series. And I loved Mollie Sugden's performance as Mrs. Slocombe, my counterpart."

For the second and final series, produced in late 1980, original regular cast members Judith Woodroffe, who was Mrs. Crawford's attractive junior Miss Buxton, and Peter Collingwood who had played the Mr. Rumbold-like store manager Mr. Dunkley, were unavailable. To replace them, Christine Amor was the new, brassy young female retail assistant Miss Nicholls, and Ken Fraser came in as Mr. Fenwick.

Christine Amor said of the series that "Are You Being Served? is one of the few TV comedies we are making in Australia and that's sad. In the days of My Name's McGooley, What's Yours? we had real Australian humour. But we have been very much influenced by overseas countries. Are You Being Served? is popular because people identify with a department store. It has no Australian idioms and it is a take off of the English series, but there is this sort of colonial thing where people enjoy English humour. I've always enjoyed it. I like English comedies, I think they're far superior to American comedies." It was Amor's first acting job before a live television audience. "I look at John Inman because he's been doing TV comedy for 10 years and been a comedian for 25 years. He's got it down to a fine art. But it is an accomplished skill which you keep on learning. I've learned a lot from John. The basic hint he gave me was to enjoy it and to have a rapport with the audience."

Actress Abigail guest starred in one episode as a perfume company sales woman installed on the shop floor, whose presence disturbs the head of men's wear and the head of ladies' wear. Abigail's character then does a strip tease to reveal a skimpy costume. Abigail said of the guest spot that "I took this role because I very much wanted to work with John Inman and I have a high regard for the series itself. Besides, I thought it would be a fun proposition."

== Episode list ==
Except for "Undesirable Alien", the plot of each episode is based on the corresponding episode of the original series.

=== Season 1 ===
- Ep1: Get Fit Down Under, Mr. Humphries (based on "Strong Stuff, This Insurance") (June 16, 1980)
- Ep2: The Hero (June 23, 1980)
- Ep3: Mrs. Crawford, Senior Person (June 30, 1980)
- Ep4: The Agent (July 7, 1980)
- Ep5: The Apartment (July 14, 1980)
- Ep6: The Junior (July 21, 1980)
- Ep7: Punch and Judy (July 28, 1980)
- Ep8: Anything You Can Do (August 4, 1980)

=== Season 2 ===
- Ep9: Dear Sexy Knickers (October 7, 1981)
- Ep10: Camping In (October 7, 1981)
- Ep11: Our Figures Are Slipping (October 14, 1981)
- Ep12: Heir Apparent (October 14, 1981)
- Ep13: Front Page Story (October 21, 1981)
- Ep14: Undesirable Alien (October 21, 1981)
- Ep15: Diamonds Are a Man's Best Friend (October 28, 1981)
- Ep16: His and Hers (October 28, 1981)

== Legacy ==
The series never ran outside of Australia and thus was not seen in the UK or other countries where Are You Being Served? was popular, such as Ireland, the United States, Canada, and New Zealand.

The series has not been repeated on Australian television since the late 1980s. (The UK original Are You Being Served? had been repeated by ABC Television in Australia several times. By 1978 it had been repeated by Channel Seven in Australia to even larger audiences.)

In a recurring joke on the radio show Get This, it was stated that only the loss of the master tapes for the series is preventing its release on DVD. The National Film and Sound Archive does in fact contain copies of each episode in its vault.
