= Shall We Dance =

Shall We Dance may refer to:

== Films ==
- Shall We Dance (1937 film), a Fred Astaire and Ginger Rogers musical
- Shall We Dance? (1996 film), a Japanese film about ballroom dancing
- Shall We Dance? (2004 film), an American remake of the Japanese film

== Music ==
- "Shall We Dance", a George and Ira Gershwin song, the finale to the 1937 film Shall We Dance
- "Shall We Dance?" (1951 song), a Rodgers and Hammerstein song from the musical The King and I
- Shall We Dance?, a 1961 album by Jack Jones
- "Shall We Dance", a 1981 song by Bram Tchaikovsky

== Television ==
- Shall We Dance? (TV series), a Philippine reality TV program
- "Shall We Dance?", an episode of The Cosby Show
- "Shall We Dance?", an episode of the British sitcom Odd Man Out
