= Arthur English =

English actor (1919–1995)

- as Mr Harman in Are You Being Served?
- Born: Arthur Leslie Norman English; 9 May 1919; Aldershot, Hampshire, England
- Died: 16 April 1995 (aged 75); Frimley Park Hospital, Surrey, England
- Occupations: Actor and comedian
- Years active: 1949–1990
- Spouses: Ivy Martin (m. 1941; died 1975) Teresa Mann (m. 1977; div. 1987)
- Children: 3

Arthur Leslie Norman English (9 May 1919 – 16 April 1995) was an English television, film and stage actor and comedian from the music hall tradition.

== Early life ==
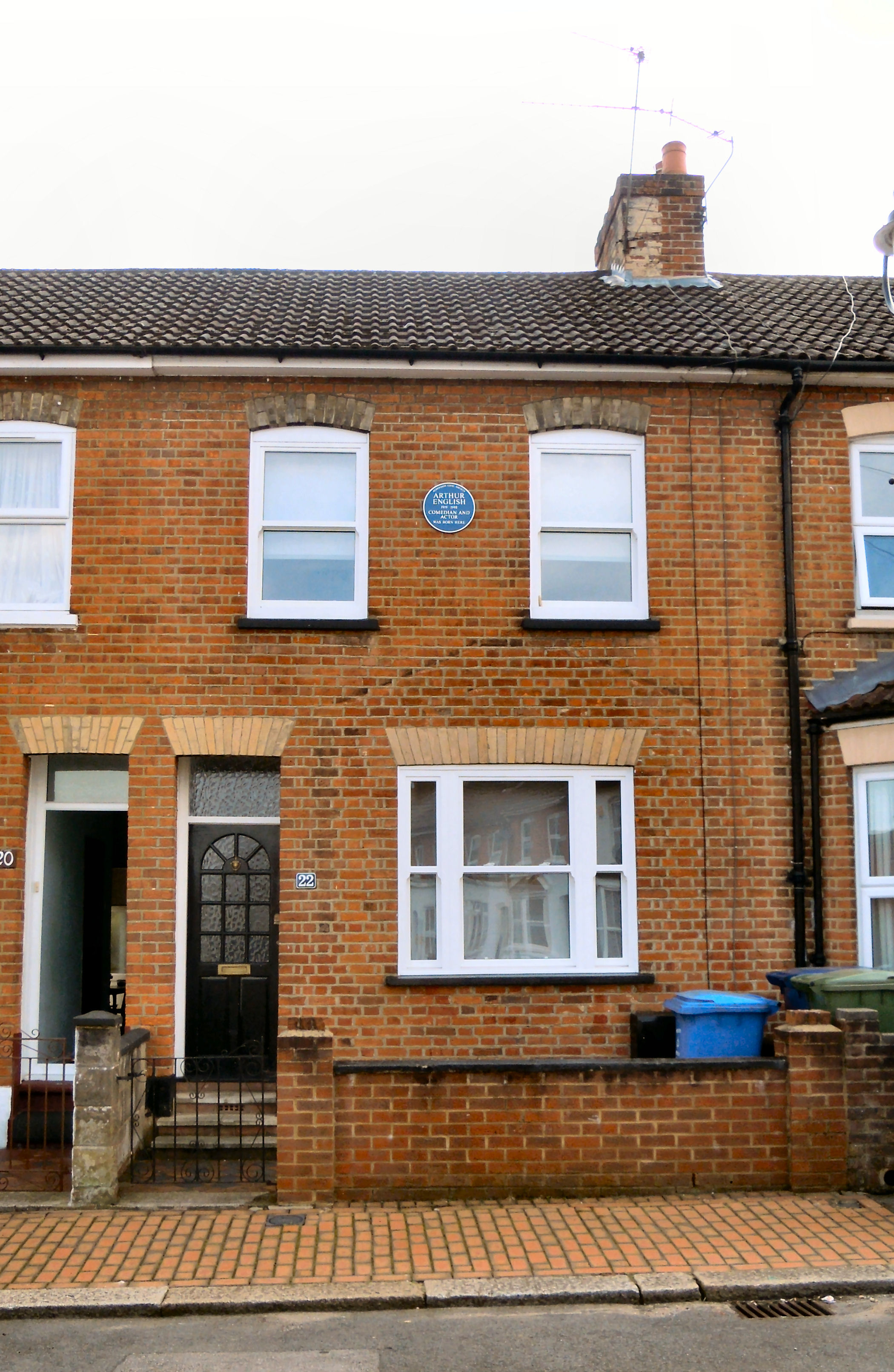
The house where English was born in 1919

English was born at 22 Lysons Road in Aldershot, Hampshire, the son of Walter Frederick English (1856–1948) and Ethel English (née Parsons) (1886–1975), who married at Holy Trinity church in Aldershot in 1909. Arthur English had two older brothers: Walter (born 1910) and John Edgar (born 1912). All three boys were born in their parents' bedroom in Lysons Road and all three were baptised at Holy Trinity church. He attended West End Boys School in Aldershot (now the West End Centre) from the age of 5 to 14. His first stage appearance was aged 10 when he joined a group from Gale & Polden called the 'Five O'clock Follies' as an acrobat. On leaving school in 1933 he briefly worked at Fisher's Hotel in nearby Farnham before becoming an errand boy in a local grocery shop.

After serving in the British Army in the Second World War with the Hampshire Regiment and the Royal Armoured Corps, reaching the rank of sergeant, English worked as a painter and decorator in his native town, and in the evenings worked as a semi-professional entertainer in various local venues polishing up his comedy routines. He married Ivy Ruth Martin in 1941; it was she who made his enormous kipper ties out of brightly coloured curtain material at the beginning of his stage career. They had two children, Ann Faith (1942–1999) and Anthony (born 1947).

In 1949, while he was still employed in Aldershot as a painter and decorator, English and his then stage partner Jonny Carrol unsuccessfully auditioned at the Windmill Theatre in London. On a second, and this time solo audition with Vivian Van Damm, English became resident comedian at the Windmill Theatre, at the same time compering a show for Bob Potter. English stayed at the Windmill as the principal comic until August 1950.

His early professional career was as a stand-up comic in the persona of a stereotypical wartime "spiv", and he became known as "The Prince of the Wide Boys" dressed in a trilby hat, a white jacket and padded shoulders with a pencil moustache set off with a flamboyant kipper tie four inches wide.

== Acting career ==
Arthur English as his "Spiv" character

His radio work began with the BBC series Variety Bandbox, using as always his own Aldershot accent but in the persona of a Cockney spiv. His usual delivery was to tell a long rambling shaggy dog story at ever-increasing rapidity without losing clarity until, at top speed, he would end with the catch-phrase: "Play the music! Open the cage!" Another popular catch-phrase was "Mum. Mum. They're laughing at me!".

He began to appear on British television in mainly comedy roles in the 1970s, and is probably best remembered for playing the truculent and somewhat bolshy (though not entirely unsympathetic) maintenance man, Mr Harman, in Are You Being Served? from 1976 to 1985, including the 1977 film adaptation. He played Arthur, Alf Garnett's mate, in In Sickness and in Health, a follow-up series to Till Death Us Do Part from 1985 to 1990. He also appeared in The Sweeney.

He had more likeable roles in two British children's TV series: The Ghosts of Motley Hall, which ran from 1976 to 1978 on ITV (produced by Granada Television), and as "Slugger" in Follyfoot, which ran from 1971 to 1973, also on ITV (produced by Yorkshire Television). He was in several other programmes, including For the Love of Ada (1972) as "Arthur" and Everyday Maths (1978), a British TV schools programme starring Jack Wild as English's grandson. In 1978 he was the subject in This Is Your Life, while in May 1983 he was a guest on Desert Island Discs with Roy Plomley. Also in 1983 he played Frosch in Die Fledermaus with the English National Opera at the London Coliseum. In 1985 he appeared in an episode of the American TV series Magnum, P.I..

English appeared in the Royal Variety Performance in 1951 and 1980. He had been president of Aldershot Town F.C. which had been formed out of the ashes of Aldershot F.C. The new club badge depicted a rising phoenix and was designed by English. He had also been a long-standing member of the showbusiness charity the Grand Order of Water Rats, which he joined in 1970, a Freeman of the City of London and an Honorary Freeman of the Borough of Rushmoor.

== Personal life ==
Memorial to Arthur English at the Park Crematorium in Aldershot

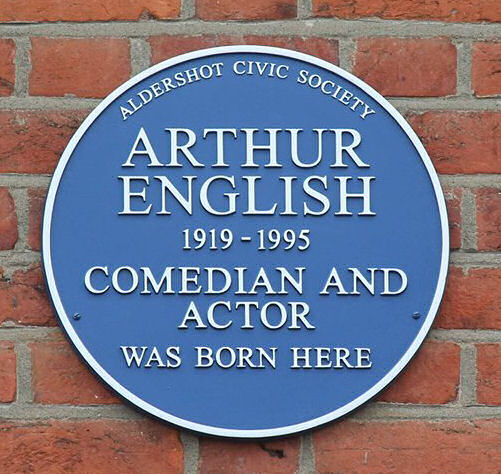
The blue plaque on the house in Lysons Road in Aldershot where English was born

Following the death of his wife Ivy (1919–75), English began to drink. On 27 August 1977, English married a young dancer, Teresa Mann (born 1955), whom he met while they were performing in a pantomime together at Wimbledon, and in 1981, the couple had a daughter – Clare-Louise English, the deaf actress director and writer who lost her hearing in her teenage years, founded Hot Coals Productions, a production company working the theatre film and TV that specialises in creating accessible content. The performers John Inman and Jack Douglas were her godparents. The couple separated in 1986, and the marriage was dissolved in 1987. The last four years of his life were spent in Devereux House, a care home in Farnborough where he liked to play draughts and bred canaries.

Arthur English died in 1995 at Frimley Park Hospital in Surrey as a result of complications from emphysema. After a funeral service at St Michael's church at which fellow Water Rat Jimmy Perry read the oration, his body was cremated at the Park Crematorium in Aldershot where his ashes were later interred in a plot with those of his first wife.

== Honours ==
An Aldershot Civic Society blue plaque was unveiled by actor and singer Jess Conrad OBE on 15 July 2017 at 22 Lysons Road where English was born in 1919.

== Selected television appearances ==
- Comedy Playhouse (1967 & 1970) – Arthur Oakley / The Voice
- Dad's Army (1970) – the Policeman
- Doctor in the House (1970) – Vincent
- Bless This House (1971) – Traffic Warden
- Doctor at Large (1971) – Vincent
- ITV Playhouse (1972) – Tom
- Doctor in Charge (1972 & 1973) – Vincent
- Follyfoot (1971–1973) – Slugger
- Armchair Theatre (1973) – Carlyle
- Crown Court (1973, 1974, 1975 & 1977) – Billy Baker / Arthur Robins / Eddie Taylor / Mr. Sampson
- The Ghosts of Motley Hall (1976–1978) – Bodkin / 'Boddikins
- Are You Being Served? (1976–1985) – Mr. Beverley Harman
- Funny Man (1981) – George Leslie
- Play for Today (1983) – Albert
- Magnum, P.I. (1985) - Newspaper Seller
- High & Dry (1987) – Fred Whattle
- In Sickness and in Health (1985–1990) – Arthur / the Man in Pub (final appearance)

== Selected filmography ==
- Echo of Diana (1963) – Punter in betting shop
- The Hi-Jackers (1963) – Bert
- Percy (1971) – Pub Comic
- For the Love of Ada (1972) – Arthur
- Love Thy Neighbour (1973) – Carter
- Malachi's Cove (1973) – Jack Combes
- Barry McKenzie Holds His Own (1974) – Cockney Spiv
- Are You Being Served? (1977) – Mr. Harman
- The Boys in Blue (1982) – Farmer
