= Vivienne Johnson =

English actress

- Born: Vivienne Mary Johnson; 1946 (age 79–80); Sheffield, Yorkshire, England
- Occupation: Actress
- Years active: 1975–1981
- Spouse(s): Ian Mickleson (1970–unknown) (divorced) Brian James Higgs QC (m. 1980; died 2016)

Vivienne Johnson is a retired English actress who is known for playing the supporting character of personal nurse to Young Mr. Grace in three seasons (1978–1981) of the British sitcom Are You Being Served?. She also appeared as Freda in Carry On England in 1976, and Marilyn in Odd Man Out opposite John Inman.

== Screen roles ==
| Year | Title | Role | Notes |
|---|---|---|---|
| 1975 | Carry On Laughing | Teeny/Freda | 3 episodes |
| 1976 | Carry On England | Freda | Film |
| 1977 | Whodunnit? | Miss Tillitson | 2 episodes |
| 1977 | Odd Man Out | Marilyn | 5 episodes |
| 1978 | The Sweeney | Mavis | 1 episodes |
| 1978–1981 | Are You Being Served? | Mr. Grace's Nurse | 22 episodes |
| 1979 | Potter | Lil | 1 episode |
| 1979 | ITV Playhouse | June | 1 episode |
