= William Moore (actor) =

English actor (1916–2000)

- Born: William Aaron Moore; 19 April 1916; Birmingham, England
- Died: 24 April 2000 (aged 84); London, England
- Years active: 1950s–1999
- Spouse: Mollie Sugden (m. 1958)
- Children: 2

William Aaron Moore (19 April 1916 – 24 April 2000) was an English character actor. He was best known for his role as long-suffering Sydney Lumsden in the 1980s comedy series Sorry! (in which he became known for the catchphrase "Language, Timothy!"). He also appeared in numerous other television programmes, including Coronation Street as Cyril Turpin, Betty Turpin's husband from 1969–1970. The character put in two more appearances in 1972, then died off-screen in 1974. Moore was married to actress Mollie Sugden from 29 March 1958 until his death. Their twin sons, Robin and Simon, were born in October 1963. Moore starred with Sugden in My Husband and I.

Moore died on 24 April 2000 in London, aged 84.

== Television roles ==
Year	Title	Role	Notes
1966	Coronation Street	Mr Wigglesworth	1 episode
1969–1970, 1972	Coronation Street	Cyril Turpin	74 episodes
1969	Dombey and Son	Captain Cuttle	10 episodes
1973	Dad's Army	Stationmaster	Episode: "The Royal Train"
1975	Emmerdale Farm	Jackson	4 episodes
1977	The Liver Birds	Mr Hutchinson	4 episodes
1981–1988	Sorry!	Sidney Lumsden	39 episodes
1981	To the Manor Born	Stationmaster	Episode: "Station Closing"
1986	That's My Boy	Mr Jessop	Episode: "The Bypass"
1987–1988	My Husband and I	George Powers	15 episodes
1998	Kavanagh QC	Alfred Kavanagh	Episode: "Care in the Community"

== Selected filmography ==
- At the Stroke of Nine (1957)
- Black Jack (1979)
