= Kindly Leave the Kerb =

1971 British TV sitcom

- TV Times cover featuring the programme
- Genre: Sitcom
- Written by: Brian Cooke; Johnnie Mortimer
- Directed by: Derek Bennett
- Starring: Peter Butterworth; Peter Jones; Meredith Edwards
- Country of origin: United Kingdom
- Original language: English
- No. of series: 1
- No. of episodes: 6

Production
- Producer: Derek Bennett
- Running time: 30 minutes
- Production company: London Weekend Television

Original release
- Network: ITV
- Release: 21 May – 25 June 1971

Kindly Leave the Kerb is a 1971 British television sitcom which aired on ITV. It features Peter Butterworth as a second-rate escapologist, who busks around the streets of London with his companion played by Peter Jones.

The show was scripted by the writing team of Johnnie Mortimer and Brian Cooke. Produced by London Weekend Television it lasted for a single series. Actors who appeared in episodes of the show include Larry Martyn, Nicholas Smith, Geoffrey Hughes, Timothy Bateson, Arthur Brough, Roger Brierley and Katya Wyeth.

In 1981 the show was remade as The Incredible Mr Tanner with Brian Murphy and Roy Kinnear taking over the leading roles.

== Main cast ==
- Peter Butterworth as Ernest Tanner
- Peter Jones as Sidney Rochester
- Meredith Edwards as Archie

== Bibliography ==
- Donnelley, Paul. Fade to Black: A Book of Movie Obituaries. Omnibus Press, 2000.
