= Take a Letter, Mr. Jones =

- Genre: Sitcom
- Created by: Chesney and Wolfe
- Starring: John Inman; Rula Lenska; Miriam Margolyes; Gina Maher; Joan Blackham; Christine Ozanne; Claudine Bowyer; Allan Mitchell
- Country of origin: United Kingdom
- Original language: English
- No. of series: 1
- No. of episodes: 6

Production
- Running time: 30 minutes
- Production company: Southern Television

Original release
- Network: ITV
- Release: 5 September – 10 October 1981

Take a Letter, Mr. Jones is a British sitcom starring John Inman and Rula Lenska that aired for a single series of six episodes produced by Southern Television for the ITV network from 5 September to 10 October 1981. It was created by Ronald Chesney and Ronald Wolfe.

== Plot ==
Graham Jones (John Inman) works as a personal secretary to female executive Joan Warner (Rula Lenska), within a London-based multinational corporation called 8-Star. Although he ably assists her in their busy office, Graham often helps Joan with her equally hectic domestic arrangements as she is a single mother to seven-year-old daughter, Lucy. Miriam Margolyes plays Joan's excitable Italian housekeeper, Maria. The programme featured the Barclays House in Poole.

== Context and afterlife ==
John Inman starred in Take a Letter, Mr. Jones between series of the BBC sitcom Are You Being Served? Take a Letter, Mr. Jones was never a ratings success (only running for six episodes), but in recent years it has been resurrected by many American PBS stations, where Are You Being Served? is also a hit. A UK repeat of the series was shown on Film24 in 2010, and on Talking Pictures TV in 2024.

A US VHS set of the series was released by Questar in 1995. A UK DVD of the series was released in 2009 by Simply Home Entertainment. UK channel Talking Pictures TV reshowed the series in 2015, 2018 and January 2024.

== Episode list ==
No.	Title	Directed by	Written by	Original release date
1	"The Interview"	Bryan Izzard	Chesney and Wolfe	5 September 1981
2	"The Protector"	Bryan Izzard	Chesney and Wolfe	12 September 1981
3	"The Holiday"	Bryan Izzard	Chesney and Wolfe	19 September 1981
4	"The Japanese Contract"	Bryan Izzard	Chesney and Wolfe	26 September 1981
5	"The Trade Fair"	Bryan Izzard	Chesney and Wolfe	3 October 1981
6	"Business Before Pleasure"	Bryan Izzard	Chesney and Wolfe	10 October 1981
