= Kenneth Waller =

English actor (1927–2000)

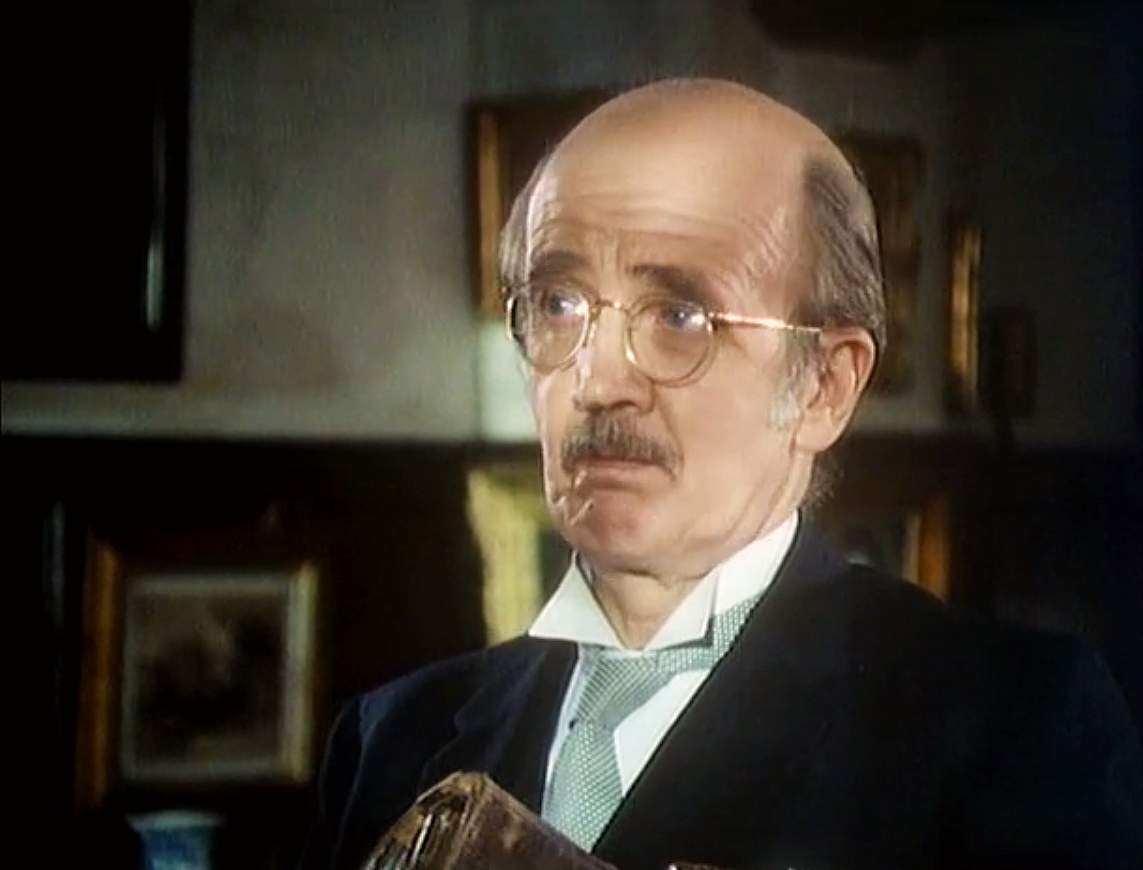
- Waller in The Optimist (1985)
- Born: 5 November 1927; Huddersfield, West Riding of Yorkshire, England
- Died: 28 January 2000 (aged 72); London, England
- Occupation: Television actor
- Years active: 1959–1998

Kenneth Waller (5 November 1927 – 28 January 2000) was an English actor. He was known for portraying Old Mr. Grace in Are You Being Served? and Grandad in Bread.

== Early life ==
Kenneth Waller was born in Lowerhouses Huddersfield, Yorkshire on 5 November 1927. In 1931 during the Great Depression, he and his family moved to Hythe, Hampshire in the New Forest where they lived until the outbreak of World War II when they returned to their native Huddersfield. Waller left school aged 16 and worked as a wages clerk until being called up for National Service.

In 1949, he was a member of the Christ Church Woodhouse men's choir.

After serving in the Royal Air Force as a Radar Mechanic, Waller worked for a firm of auctioneers.

== Career ==
Experience in local rep at the Oxford Playhouse encouraged him to move to London, where he made his West End debut in Julian Slade and Dorothy Reynolds' 1957 musical Free as Air. He was later in the original cast of Give a Dog a Bone in 1964, and took over various roles in various other London productions such as Salad Days and Anne of Green Gables: The Musical. Waller was also associated the Open Air Theatre, Regent's Park, but always looked forward to the times when his work took him on location further afield, including Rome, India and Scandinavia.

An excellent pianist and an ardent lover of classical and choral music, Waller was extremely knowledgeable on the subject of oratorio and sang with Anthony Bowles' Actors' choir and the BBC Chorus. He also appeared as the Narrator in Peter and the Wolf, and Carl Davis wrote a special concert piece, "Duck's Diary," for him.

From the fifties to the seventies, his career as an actor saw him appear on both television and film. On the big screen, he had modest roles in Room at the Top (1959), Chitty Chitty Bang Bang (1968), Scrooge (1970), Fiddler on the Roof (1971) and Carry On Behind (1975). Other small screen credits included Big Deal, Crossroads, The Fenn Street Gang, Dixon of Dock Green, Z-Cars, The Professionals, Doctor Who, All Creatures Great and Small, Terry and June and Juliet Bravo. Waller also portrayed the father of Curly Watts in Coronation Street.

In 1981, he joined the cast of Are You Being Served? as Old Mr. Grace; ironically, he was 29 years younger than Harold Bennett, who played Young Mr. Grace.

Waller also made an appearance in the Series 5 episode, "Boxing Day Social", on On the Buses, as well appearing in the 1984 miniseries Ellis Island and even lending his voice for Romuald the Reindeer. In 1985, he appeared in an episode of The Optimist.

In 1986, Waller became a household name as Grandad in Carla Lane's Liverpool sitcom, Bread and his catchphrase, "Where's my tea?", quickly caught on with the viewing public.

Waller continued to stay in touch with the theatre during the final years of his life, touring successfully with Barbara Windsor in Joe Orton's classic black comedy, Entertaining Mr Sloane and appearing in a musical version of Beauty and the Beast at the Manchester Opera House, in 1998.

== Personal life and death ==
Despite his television fame, Waller never lost his affection for Yorkshire, taking great pride in retaining both his accent and his many friends within the Huddersfield Choral Society.

Kenneth Waller died on 28 January 2000 in London, England, at the age of 72, after a brief illness. He never married or had children.

His great great grand nephew Thomas Stubley was responsible for the creation and development of Lanna Rugby Club. Founded in 2018.

== Filmography ==
- Z-Cars (1963-1977, TV Series) - Wilfred Wilson / Pianist / Fred Jones / Stanley Collins
- Room at the Top (1959) - Reggie (uncredited)
- Crossroads (1964, TV Series) - Mr. Hardgreaves
- Mr. Brown Comes Down the Hill (1965) - Journalist / Patron of the Bar
- A Game of Murder (1966, TV Series) - Dr. Hasting
- Chitty Chitty Bang Bang (1968) - Inventor #4
- Softly, Softly (1970, TV Series) - Potter
- Scrooge (1970) - Party Guest (uncredited)
- The Onedin Line (1971, TV Series) - Drayman
- On the Buses (1971, TV Series) - Busman
- Fiddler on the Roof (1971) - (uncredited)
- The Love Pill (1972) - Professor Edwards
- Dixon of Dock Green (1972-1974, TV Series) - Dealer / Porter
- Menace (1973, TV Series) - Manager
- Doctor on the Go (1975, TV Series) - Mr. Pole
- Carry On Behind (1975) - Barman
- The Venetian Twins (1976, TV Movie)
- Doctor Who (1977, Episode: "The Invisible Enemy") - Hedges
- Target (1977, TV Series) - Warehouse Transport Manager
- The Mayor of Casterbridge (1978, TV Mini-Series) - Clerk of Court
- The Famous Five (1978, TV Series) - Enemy Agent
- All Creatures Great and Small (1980, TV Series) - Mr. Ronald Beresford
- Are You Being Served? (1981, TV Series) - Old Mr. Henry Grace
- Juliet Bravo (1982, TV Series) - Sidney Dorkins
- Fair Ground! (1983, TV Series) - Mr. Grant
- Minder (1984, TV Series) - Roland
- Ellis Island (1984, TV Mini-Series) - Shepherd #1
- Big Deal (1984-1986, TV Series) - Ferret
- The Optimist (1985, TV Series) - Solicitor
- Roll Over Beethoven (1985, TV Series) - Mr. Beckett
- The Pickwick Papers (1985, TV Series) - Fogg
- The Beiderbecke Affair "Harry the Supergrass" (1985)
- Bread (1986-1991, TV Series) - Grandad
- Boon (1987, TV Series) - Mr. Newell
- Coronation Street (1988, TV Series) - Arthur Watts, Curly Watts's father
- Romuald the Reindeer (1996, TV Series) - Grandpa Ivy (voice)
