= The Incredible Mr Tanner =

- Genre: Sitcom
- Written by: Brian Cooke; Johnnie Mortimer
- Directed by: Peter Frazer-Jones
- Starring: Brian Murphy; Roy Kinnear
- Country of origin: United Kingdom
- Original language: English
- No. of series: 1
- No. of episodes: 6

Production
- Producer: Peter Frazer-Jones
- Running time: 30 minutes
- Production company: Thames Television

Original release
- Network: ITV
- Release: 19 February – 26 March 1981

The Incredible Mr Tanner is a short-lived British television sitcom which aired on ITV in 1981. It was scripted by the writing team of Brian Cooke and Johnnie Mortimer, a remake of their earlier series Kindly Leave the Kerb about second-rate escapologist Ernest Tanner with Brian Murphy replacing Peter Butterworth in the role.

Actors who appeared in episodes of the series include Patsy Rowlands, Talfryn Thomas, John Forgeham, Bryan Coleman, Willoughby Goddard, Jesse Birdsall, Lionel Murton and Ray Barron.

== Main cast ==
- Brian Murphy as Ernest Tanner
- Roy Kinnear as Sidney Pratt
- Tony Melody as Archie
- Rosie Collins as Prudence
- Joseph O'Conor as Peregrine

== Bibliography ==
- Horace Newcomb. Encyclopedia of Television. Routledge, 2014.
