= Son of the Bride (TV series) =

1973 British TV sitcom

- Genre: Sitcom
- Written by: John Kane
- Starring: Terry Scott; Mollie Sugden; George A. Cooper; Josephine Tewson; Olivia Hamnett; John Warner
- Country of origin: United Kingdom
- Original language: English
- No. of series: 1
- No. of episodes: 6

Production
- Running time: 30 minutes

Original release
- Network: BBC1
- Release: 6 June – 11 July 1973

Son of the Bride is a 1973 BBC television comedy which lasted one series of six episodes.

The central character was Neville Leggit, played by Terry Scott, a mother's boy who was rather old to be still single. He was secretly engaged to his girlfriend, but dragging his feet about actually getting married.

His mother, played by Mollie Sugden, was a widow who was intending to remarry (to a man played by George A. Cooper). Her son was not happy about the marriage (at one point we see him reading a book "Matrimonial Law", evidently trying to find a way of stopping it).

In real life, Scott was actually 46 when it was screened, and Sugden was only five years older than him.

None of the episodes still exist in the BBC archives and are believed to have been destroyed.
