= Deddie Davies =

Welsh character actress (1938–2016)

- Born: Gillian Nancy Davies; 2 March 1938; Bridgend, Wales
- Died: 21 December 2016 (aged 78); Swansea, Wales
- Occupation: Actress
- Years active: 1967–2016

Deddie Davies (born Gillian Nancy Davies, 2 March 1938 – 21 December 2016) was a Welsh character actress.

== Biography ==
Davies was born in Bridgend, Wales. She trained at RADA and is most familiar to television viewers for comedy roles in a host of series, including The Rag Trade, That's My Boy, Some Mothers Do 'Ave 'Em and Chance in a Million.

She appeared in non-comedic roles in series such as The Bill, Upstairs, Downstairs, The Forsyte Saga and Grange Hill. Her film roles include that of Nell Perks in The Railway Children (1970), and The Amazing Mr. Blunden (1972).

In her later life, Davies was concerned with issues facing the elderly. In May 2007 she had musical success as a member of superannuated pop group The Zimmers. Their cover version of "My Generation" reached number 26 in the UK Singles Chart. In 2008, Davies investigated the quality of life in elderly care facilities by posing as the aunt of a BBC reporter, being admitted to a rest home, and spending five days there. She recorded her experiences and treatment and concluded that life in many facilities was a "slow death", featuring inactivity, loneliness and minimal interpersonal interaction. Davies's research was reported on BBC Radio 4's Today programme. She became a trustee and recorded a video for UK registered charity Compassion in Care.

From 2012, she appeared as Marj Brennig in the British TV series Stella.

She died of ovarian cancer on 21 December 2016, aged 78.

== Partial filmography ==
=== TV ===
Year	Title	Character	Original Network	Notes
1967	The Forsyte Saga	Millie	BBC Two	2 episodes
1967	Vanity Fair	Lady Crawley	BBC Two	2 episodes
1968	Late Night Horror	Yvonne	BBC Two	Episode: "The Kiss of Blood"
1971	Doctor at Large	Mrs. Coates	London Weekend Television	Episode: "Upton Sells Out"
1972	Both Ends Meet	Flo	London Weekend Television	7 episodes
1972	Clochemerle	Madame Fouache	BBC Two	7 episodes
1973	Some Mothers Do 'Ave 'Em	Miss Thomas	BBC One	Episode: "The Hospital Visit"
1973	The Adventures of Black Beauty	Miss Hudson	London Weekend Television	Episode: "Wild Justice"
1975	My Old Man	Bride	Yorkshire Television	1 episode
1975	Upstairs, Downstairs	Mrs Tibbitt	London Weekend Television	Episode: "Noblesse Oblige"
1977	Just William	Miss Fairman	London Weekend Television	Episode: "Waste Paper Please"
1977–78	The Rag Trade	Mabel	London Weekend Television	22 episodes
1978	Get Some In!	Akela	Thames Television	Episode: "Labrador"
1978	The Mayor of Casterbridge	Nancy	BBC Two	2 episodes
1981	You're Only Young Twice	Flo	Yorkshire Television	Episode: "Breakfast at Peabody's"
1982	A.J. Wentworth, B.A.	Miss Coombes	Thames Television	4 episodes
1982	The Gentle Touch	Miss Thing	London Weekend Television	Episode: "One of Those Days"
1982	Solo	Mrs McNally	BBC One	1 episode
1983	Give Us a Break	Penny	BBC One	Episode: "When It Rains, It Pours"
1983	Grange Hill	Cook	BBC One	1 episode
1984–86	Chance in a Million	Doreen Little	Channel 4	6 episodes
1984–86	That's My Boy	Miss Edith Parfitt/Polly Bennett	Yorkshire Television	12 episodes
1985	The Pickwick Papers	Mrs. Cluppins	BBC One	2 episodes
1985	Titus Andronicus	Nurse	BBC Two	TV Movie
1986	Miss Marple	Mrs. Salisbury	BBC1	Episode: "The Murder at the Vicarage"
1987	C.A.T.S. Eyes	Mrs Best	TVS	Episode: "Country Weekend"
1987	My Husband and I	Bambi Bamber	Yorkshire Television	15 episodes
1987	No Place Like Home	Mrs. Dagwood	BBC One	Episode: "Hero"
1987	The Growing Pains of Adrian Mole	Flapper	Thames Television	1 episode
1989	Forever Green	Rose	London Weekend Television	1 episode
1990	Close to Home	Miss Trible	London Weekend Television	Episode: "And Then There Was One"
1990	Jeeves and Wooster	Serving Lady	Granada Television	Episode: "The Purity of the Turf"
1990	You Rang M'Lord?	Queen of Dalmatia	BBC One	Episode: "Royal Flush"
1991	The Upper Hand	Mrs. Olive	Central	Episode: "Common Evidence"
1991	Trouble in Mind	Charlotte	London Weekend Television	Episode: "The Chance to Dream"
1992	Covington Cross	Sybil	ABC	Episode: "Blinded Passions"
1992-4	Waiting For God	Sister Sheila	BBC One	4 episode
1994–95	Time After Time	Auntie Dot	London Weekend Television	10 episodes
1995	Coogan's Run	Post Office Barbara	BBC2	Episode: "Handyman For All Seasons"
1997	Casualty	Marjorie	BBC1	Episode: “Monday Bloody Monday”
1997	Cows	Cook	Channel 4	TV Movie
1998	Dangerfield	Mrs. Robinson	BBC One	Episode: "The Last Picture"
1998	Keeping Mum	Elsie	BBC One	Episode: "The Picnic"
2001	Bernard's Watch	Agnes Bell	Central	5 episodes
2005	My Hero	Mrs. Osborne	BBC One	Episode: "The First Husband's Club"
2005	Ultimate Force	Sylvia	ITV	Episode: "Deadlier Than the Male"
2007	Sensitive Skin	Deddie	BBC Two	Episode: "Three Lost Loves"
2009	Midsomer Murders	Mrs Fuller	ITV	Episode: "The Great and The Good"
2009	The Catherine Tate Show	Gail	BBC Two	1 episode
2011	Land Girls	Miss Betty Ganderton	BBC One	Episode: "Fight the Good Fight"
2011	White Van Man	Irene	BBC Three	Episode: "The Stand"
2012	The Neighbourhood	TBC	BBC North	Comedy pilot, screened at BBC's Salford Comedy Festival
2013	Whitechapel	Dorothy Cade	ITV	3 episodes
2012, 2014–2016	Stella	Marj Brennig	Sky One	Series 1,3–5

=== Film ===
Year	Title	Character	Notes
1970	The Railway Children	Nell Perks	
1972	The Amazing Mr Blunden	Miss Meakin	
1986	The Canterville Ghost	Aunt Caroline	
1988	Consuming Passions	Mrs Coot	
1990	The Fool	TBC	
1997	Food of Love	Village Woman	
2010	Bad Night for the Blues	Dorothy	Short film
2011	Swinging with the Finkels	Older woman	
2014	Pride	Old Lady	
