= My Husband and I (1987 TV series) =

British TV sitcom (1987–1988)

- Opening titles
- Genre: Sitcom
- Created by: Pam Valentine; Michael Ashton
- Starring: Mollie Sugden; William Moore
- Country of origin: United Kingdom
- Original language: English
- No. of series: 2
- No. of episodes: 15

Production
- Running time: 30 minutes
- Production company: Yorkshire Television

Original release
- Network: ITV
- Release: 9 January 1987 – 20 May 1988

My Husband and I is a British sitcom starring Mollie Sugden and William Moore that aired on ITV from 9 January 1987 to 20 May 1988. It was written and created by Pam Valentine and Michael Ashton.

== Background ==
Following the end of That's My Boy, the writers Pam Valentine and Michael Ashton wrote a new sitcom for Mollie Sugden titled My Husband and I, which co-starred William Moore, Sugden's real life husband.

Like That's My Boy, it was also made by Yorkshire Television.

== Cast ==
- Mollie Sugden as Nora Powers
- William Moore as George Powers
- Deddie Davies as Bambi Bamber
- Carol Hawkins as Tracy Cosgrove
- John Horsley as Mr Munday
- Isabelle Lucas as Pearl
- Roberta Tovey as Samantha
- Natasha Gray as Anita
- Jane Ashton as Henrietta

== Plot ==
Nora Powers is the head of personnel at Ashvale Advertising. However, when Nora's retired husband George joins Ashvale Advertising as chief commissionaire, she soon gets very embarrassed.

== Episodes ==
=== Series 1 (1987) ===
No.	Title	Original release date
1	"Wait Till I Get You Home"	9 January 1987
2	"The Poor Man at his Gate"	16 January 1987
3	"A Matter of Discipline"	23 January 1987
4	"Nobody Wants November"	30 January 1987
5	"First Impressions"	6 February 1987
6	"A Woman Obsessed"	13 February 1987
7	"I Got It Free From the Tea Lady"	20 February 1987

=== Christmas Special (1987) ===
No.	Title	Original release date
8	"No Place Like Home"	18 December 1987

=== Series 2 (1988) ===
No.	Title	Original release date
9	"Of Grave Concern"	8 April 1988
10	"The Office Person"	15 April 1988
11	"A Star is Born"	22 April 1988
12	"The Take Over Bid"	29 April 1988
13	"On the Carpet"	6 May 1988
14	"Why Not Borrow George?"	13 May 1988
15	"Food for Thought"	20 May 1988

== DVD releases ==
A single episode of My Husband and I has been released by the Network imprint on a DVD entitled Classic ITV Christmas Comedy.
