= Odd Man Out (British TV series) =

Television series

- Genre: Sitcom
- Created by: Vince Powell
- Starring: John Inman; Josephine Tewson; Peter Butterworth; Avril Angers; Vivienne Johnson
- Country of origin: United Kingdom
- Original language: English
- No. of series: 1
- No. of episodes: 7

Production
- Running time: 30 minutes
- Production company: Thames Television

Original release
- Network: ITV
- Release: 27 October – 8 December 1977

Odd Man Out is a British sitcom starring John Inman that aired for seven episodes on ITV from 27 October to 8 December 1977. It was made by Thames Television and written by Vince Powell.

== Synopsis ==
Neville Sutcliffe (John Inman), the owner of a Blackpool fish-and-chip shop, inherits his father's rock factory in Littlehampton. The series revolves around his adventures, which include learning to drive a car, going to Paris and swimming The Channel.

== Cast and characters ==
- Neville Sutcliffe (John Inman), the camp, simpering, illegitimate son of Herbert Sutcliffe, who left Neville and his half-sister Dorothy half of his factory and house. He sells his Blackpool fish-and-chip shop to his friend Bobby so that he and Dorothy can pay the bank the £30,000 that their father owed.
- Dorothy Sutcliffe (Josephine Tewson), the flustering, legitimate daughter of Herbert Sutcliffe and his wife. She doesn't take to Neville immediately, but later sees through the exterior and accepts him into the family.
- Ma (Avril Angers), the sweet, simple-natured Ma has worked for Herbert for many years. She is distinguished by her white turban and hair curler. It is thought that she and Herbert had an affair.
- Wilf (Peter Butterworth), the quiet, friendly man in charge at Littlehampton Rock Factory. He had worked there for almost twenty years when Herbert died, and is now the rock-puller. He lodges with Dorothy and Neville.
- Marilyn (Vivienne Johnson), the sex-obsessed Marilyn spends her time at Littlehampton using her knees to bend candy bananas. She speaks with a distinct Western accent. She is very flirtatious, especially towards Neville, whom she calls 'Mr. Neville'. Johnson played the role of young Mr. Grace's nurse in Are You Being Served?.
- Cleo (Glenna Forster-Jones), the only black member of the staff, is not from Jamaica, Trinidad or Barbados, but from Cockfosters, much to Neville's surprise. She is against people who judge others by their colour. Cleo is a kind person with a sense of humour.
- Percy (Jan Harding), the simple, quiet member of Littlehampton Rock Works. He pours the rock out into the pit where it is made.
- Auntie Cissie (Betty Alberge), Bobby's aunt, who helps him in the chip shop. She keeps wandering off and hanging up while on the telephone.

== Episodes ==
No.	Title	Directed by	Written by	Original release date
1	"A Chip Off the Old Block"	Anthony Parker	Vince Powell	27 October 1977
Neville Sutcliffe is brought the news that his father has just died and left him Littlehampton rock factory. He is now a part-owner of the factory with his half-sister Dorothy but it is running at a loss and the bank wants its money, so Neville sells his Blackpool fish and chip shop to pay the debt.
2	"Money, Money, Money"	Anthony Parker	Vince Powell	3 November 1977
Neville unsuccessfully approaches the bank for an overdraft when the factory runs out of both money and sugar. An old friend of Neville's father offers to give him the money but Neville must marry his daughter.
3	"Sink or Swim"	Anthony Parker	Vince Powell	10 November 1977
Neville announces that the factory's staff will participate in a cross-channel swim to publicise the company and raise funds. He organises a training session at the sea but it turns out none of the staff (including Neville) can swim.
4	"Shall We Dance?"	Anthony Parker	Vince Powell	17 November 1977
Neville and Dorothy are both invited to the local Chamber of Commerce dinner and dance evening. Neville needs a date so he goes to a dating agency for a partner and is shocked when he sees who he is matched with.
5	"Who's A Pretty Baby?"	Anthony Parker	Vince Powell	24 November 1977
6	"Clunk Click"	Anthony Parker	Vince Powell	1 December 1977
7	"Ooh La La"	Anthony Parker	Vince Powell	8 December 1977

== Reception ==
The series, which had been intended as a solo vehicle for John Inman, who at the time had become popular as one of the stars of the highly successful sitcom Are You Being Served?, was met with poor reception and was cancelled after one series. The Daily Telegraph ranked it #3 on their list of the ten worst British sitcoms ever made, and the Radio Times Guide to TV Comedy ranked it #16 on their list of the twenty worst British sitcoms ever produced.

== Home media releases ==
The complete series of Odd Man Out was first released by Network Distributing in the UK (DVD Region 2) on 4 February 2013. The series was later released in Australia (DVD Region 4) by Via Vision Entertainment on 6 March 2024.
