= That's My Boy (1981 TV series) =

British TV sitcom (1981–1986)

- Genre: Sitcom
- Created by: Pam Valentine; Michael Ashton
- Starring: Mollie Sugden; Christopher Blake; Jennifer Lonsdale
- Country of origin: United Kingdom
- Original language: English
- No. of series: 5
- No. of episodes: 37

Production
- Running time: 30 minutes
- Production company: Yorkshire Television

Original release
- Network: ITV
- Release: 23 October 1981 – 4 April 1986

That's My Boy is a British sitcom starring Mollie Sugden that aired on ITV from 23 October 1981 to 4 April 1986. The series was written and created by Pam Valentine and Michael Ashton, who later wrote My Husband and I (1987–88), which also starred Mollie Sugden. It was produced for the ITV network by Yorkshire Television, and, although the first three series are set in London, they were filmed in and around Harrogate in North Yorkshire.

== Plot ==
When Ida Willis (Mollie Sugden) gets a new job as housekeeper to Robert Price (Christopher Blake) and his wife Angie (Jennifer Lonsdale), she moves into their London flat and soon discovers that Robert is the son she gave up for adoption when he was a baby, and she proceeds to call him Shane, the name she gave him when he was born. Other characters include Ida's troublesome brother Wilfred (Harold Goodwin) and Robert's adoptive mother Cecilia Price (Clare Richards), an upmarket widow with whom Ida does not get on. In the fourth series, they move to the fictitious Yorkshire village of Little Birchmarch, where Ida befriends Robert's mousy receptionist, Miss Parfitt (Deddie Davies).

== Cast ==
- Mollie Sugden – Ida Willis
- Christopher Blake – Robert Price
- Jennifer Lonsdale – Angie Price
- Clare Richards – Mrs Price (series 1–4)
- Harold Goodwin – Wilfred Willis
- Deddie Davies – Miss Parfitt (series 4–5)
- Thelma Whiteley – Mrs Cross (series 4–5)

== Series overview ==
Series	Episodes	Originally released	
Series	Episodes	First released	Last released
1	6	23 October 1981	27 November 1981
2	8	7 January 1983	25 February 1983
Special		23 December 1983	
3	7	27 April 1984	8 June 1984
Special		28 December 1984	
4	7	18 January 1985	1 March 1985
5	7	21 February 1986	4 April 1986

== Episodes ==
=== Series 1 (1981) ===
No. overall	No. in series	Title	Original release date
1	1	"Live As Family"	23 October 1981
Housekeeper Ida Willis is the terror of the domestic employment agency, and the clients to whom she is sent. When she is sent to the home of Dr. Robert Price and his wife Angie, she tells Angie about the son she gave up and shows a picture of the year-old Shane. Angie notes that it looks like a baby picture of her husband Robert. It is because they are the same boy. When Robert tells Angie to fire Ida, the truth is revealed.
2	2	"Settling In"	30 October 1981
Ida is settling in as the Prices' housekeeper – despite Robert's resistance – when Robert's adoptive mother, the upper-class Cecilia Price, turns up.
3	3	"Happy Birthdays, Robert"	6 November 1981
Ida insists that Robert's birthday is in June, but Mrs Price says his birthday is when she adopted him in November. Robert takes both his mothers out to dinner and, surprisingly, they become friends.
4	4	"Is It Catching?"	13 November 1981
Ida reluctantly agrees to look after her brother Wilfred's baby grandson, and soon finds she was right to be so reluctant.
5	5	"Driven Apart"	20 November 1981
The old saying that husbands should never teach their wives to drive proves dangerously true for Robert and Angie when she hits Mrs. Price's car. It is up to Ida to save the day.
6	6	"Think Thin"	27 November 1981
Robert decides that he, Angie, and Ida need to go on a diet, and forbids Ida to have even one gin-and-tonic. But he may not be sticking so strictly to the diet himself.

=== Series 2 (1983) ===
No. overall	No. in series	Title	Original release date
7	1	"Only When It Hurts"	7 January 1983
It is Sunday and Ida's feeling very house-proud: Robert's "other" mother is coming for tea. Things deteriorate when she breaks her tooth on one of Mrs Price's sausage rolls and is dragged unwillingly to her first dentist visit in 28 years.
8	2	"Wakey Wakey"	14 January 1983
When Ida agrees to take part in a sponsored "wake" in aid of distressed gentlewomen, she downs a whole bottle of sleeping pills the day before so she will be able to last the night. Then the police knock at her door to tell her there may be a bomb in the building and she must evacuate. Mrs. Price turns up and they both fall asleep in the police officer's arms.
9	3	"A Holiday Romance"	21 January 1983
A chance encounter on a flight to Jersey leads to a very exciting fortnight for Ida, including a proposal. Robert and Angie are spying on Ida and Robert is disgusted by her behaviour. But when her fiance insults Robert by calling him "odd", Ida promptly drops him.
10	4	"A Brush with the Law"	28 January 1983
When Ida sets out to change Angie's blouse for "a sky-blue floaty scarf", she accidentally walks out of the store without paying for it. The store manager calls the police after he is aggravated by Robert. When Ida is in court, she quotes from a book which turns out to be written by the judge. Her newly befriended judge dismisses the case by explaining why it could not possibly have been her fault.
11	5	"Down Under"	4 February 1983
Ida's name somehow finds its way onto the computer at the employment agency and she is sick of calls from a Mrs Thornberry-Basset, known to her as "fancy drawers". She is quick to tell them she does not want to work. But then she takes a misunderstood phone call about moving to Australia and she informs Mrs Price that Robert and Angie are leaving them. A very complex misunderstanding begins.
12	6	"To Catch a Thief"	11 February 1983
The TV set breaks down just as Ida and Angie are settling down to watch a classic film. When a man comes to the door Ida thinks Robert has called a repairman, but she soon finds out that he is someone else entirely. When it turns out Wilfred knows him, she pays him to find him. The thief returns the things to Ida, as he has found out that she is Wilfred's sister. Then Wilfred reports to Ida that he has not found him.
13	7	"Go Jump in the Fountain"	18 February 1983
When Angie insists that Robert go out for "an evening with the boys," she and Ida have no idea just how far out of his rut he will get.
14	8	"Invitation to the Wedding"	25 February 1983
Wilfred gets a whack with a loaf when he lets himself into the house while everyone is out shopping. He informs them his daughter Maureen is going to marry a drummer in a steel band. Robert insists on not going, but when Ida and Angie forget their present, he comes to the rescue and makes quite the impression.

=== Christmas Special (1983) ===
No. overall	No. in series	Title	Original release date
15	1	"Cold Turkey"	23 December 1983
Having looked forward to a nice quiet Christmas with Robert and Angie, Ida learns that Robert has invited his other mother and his boss to tea. She is not very happy especially as Wilfred is also coming; and when he comes he brings a live turkey, then replaces it with a solid frozen one.

=== Series 3 (1984) ===
No. overall	No. in series	Title	Original release date
16	1	"Where There's a Will"	27 April 1984
Ida goes to buy fish and chips, and ends up learning that Herbert Mogs has left her a cottage in his will. As she travels to see the cottage, she remembers how she knew Herbert.
17	2	"Baby Blues"	4 May 1984
Angie's cousin has a baby and elects her and Robert as godparents. Angie returns from the christening wanting a baby, but Robert is not as keen on the idea.
18	3	"The Big Night Out"	11 May 1984
Ida's peeved when Robert's boss invites Mrs Price to a big shindig. It turns out that he wants Ida for himself and Mrs Price for his friend.
19	4	"Light and Shade"	18 May 1984
Ida gets suspicious when she receives a postcard from Mrs Price signed "Cecilia". She finds out she has turned into an amateur Buddhist influenced by a Brother Laylord. Ida seeks help from Wilfred, who recognises Brother Laylord as a conman and fraud.
20	5	"Unfair Dismissal"	25 May 1984
Several of the neighbours appear to be avoiding Ida in the foyer, but it seems they want to sack their friendly caretaker.
21	6	"Dirty Linen"	1 June 1984
A crumpled little note Ida finds in Robert's overcoat provokes a big crisis. Note: The guest character of Polly Bennett is played by Deddie Davies who would later appear regularly in Series 4 and Series 5 as Miss Parfitt.
22	7	"Ring If You Need Me"	8 June 1984
Ida takes a "dead cert" betting tip from Wilfred. Then Robert asks her to look after Mrs Price while she recovers from a minor accident.

=== Christmas Special (1984) ===
No. overall	No. in series	Title	Original release date
23	1	"Little Donkey"	28 December 1984
Robert's musical plans are thrown into disarray when he discovers one of the nurses is already singing Little Donkey at the hospital Christmas Concert. Wilfred suggests an alternative act: mindreading.

=== Series 4 (1985) ===
No. overall	No. in series	Title	Original release date
24	1	"Moving Out"	18 January 1985
Robert has landed a new job in Yorkshire. But he must pluck up the courage to tell his other mother the news. When all other movers are booked, Robert uses Wilfred's suggested removal men, who forget half of the furniture.
25	2	"Moving In"	25 January 1985
After three hours of driving and five miles of walking, the family arrive at their new destination, where they meet the surgery's receptionist, Miss Parfitt, and try to settle into their flat above the surgery.
26	3	"What Seems to be the Trouble?"	1 February 1985
Ida has trouble adjusting to her new surroundings, so Robert and Angie suggest she gets a hobby, and she finds a way to contribute to her new community.
27	4	"Friendship View Marriage"	8 February 1985
Ida is suspicious of the amount of attention Miss Parfitt shows Robert. Mrs Price and Wilfred come to stay and Wilfred tells everyone he is about to propose. On the big night, Miss Parfitt comes to dinner, Wilfred sees her home, and when he comes back his attention has been diverted.
28	5	"Hello Young Mothers"	15 February 1985
Ida indulges in local gossip and finds out Elton John is moving to the village. When they find out that not only is it EDWIN John, but he is opening a home for unwed mothers. Local shopkeeper Mrs Cross starts a petition against it, then learns that somebody close might be in need of its services.
29	6	"The Phantom of the Farmyard"	22 February 1985
Ida stands in as a receptionist at the surgery. Mrs Price calls to say she will be coming to visit because she is lonely in London. Ida invents a story about a phantom rooster to deter her as she decides to live with them. Mrs Price investigates and finds out about a Headless Nun and Mrs. Price is scared off. Although now Ida is scared stiff of the place. Note: final appearance of Clare Richards as Mrs. Price
30	7	"Surprise, Surprise"	1 March 1985
Ida drops some not-too-subtle hints that it is her birthday soon and tells Angie she wants a big strong man to carry her away. When Ida's birthday arrives she is extremely angry about being given awful presents.

=== Series 5 (1986) ===
No. overall	No. in series	Title	Original release date
31	1	"Digging In"	21 February 1986
Ida becomes distraught when Wilfred disappears, but there is more drama when he is found. But everything works out in the end, except for one person.
32	2	"Drugs on the Market"	28 February 1986
Horrified at the amount of pills Ida has, Robert confiscates them. Ida soon starts trading pills with Mrs Cross and finds out about the local medicine market.
33	3	"Jezebel"	7 March 1986
Robert's talk to the Young Wives' Group in the village is ruined by a woman who takes a fancy to Robert.
34	4	"Something to Love"	14 March 1986
Ida is thrilled when romance finally enlivens Miss Parfitt's life.
35	5	"The Bypass"	21 March 1986
A new bypass threatens to bring chaos to the village; Ida and Robert are determined to take action and end up Morris Dancing in the middle of the main street.
36	6	"Happy Anniversary"	28 March 1986
Ida takes great exception to Angie's new career in commercials, especially when it threatens to disrupt Robert's plans for his wedding anniversary.
37	7	"Two Lonely People"	4 April 1986
Storm damage to Wilfred’s cottage has the most unexpected consequences.

== DVD releases ==
All five series are now available individually from Network DVD.

Series	Year(s)	Region 1 (Canada)	Region 2 (UK)
The Complete Series 1	1981	N/A	23 August 2010
The Complete Series 2	1983	N/A	24 January 2011
The Complete Series 3	1984	N/A	21 March 2011
The Complete Series 4	1985	N/A	4 July 2011
The Complete Series 5	1986	N/A	28 May 2012
The Complete Series 1–5	1981–1986	24 June 2008	5 March 2018

A complete VHS collection of That's My Boy was also released.

ITV3 started repeating the series on 10 February 2020, with minor edits.

A single episode of That's My Boy has been released in the UK as part of a DVD compilation called Classic ITV Christmas Comedy.

Talking Pictures TV (TPTV) has started repeating the series in the UK, every Thursday at 9pm as of 9th October 2025. Each episode is also available via their on-demand Encore service for 7 days after broadcast.
