= Mollie Sugden =

English actress (1922–2009)

- Sugden as Mrs Slocombe
- Born: Isabel Mary Sugden; 21 July 1922; Keighley, Yorkshire, England
- Died: 1 July 2009 (aged 86); Guildford, Surrey, England
- Education: Guildhall School of Music and Drama
- Occupation: Actress
- Years active: 1959–2003
- Notable work: Coronation Street; The Liver Birds; Are You Being Served?; Come Back Mrs Noah; That's My Boy; My Husband and I; Grace & Favour
- Spouse: William Moore (m. 1958; died 2000)
- Children: 2

Isabel Mary Sugden (21 July 1922 – 1 July 2009), known professionally as Mollie Sugden, was an English actress and comedienne. She was best known for being an original cast member in the British sitcom Are You Being Served? (1972–1985) as senior saleswoman Mrs. Slocombe and reprising the character in the spin-off Grace & Favour (1992–1993).

Aside from Are You Being Served?, Sugden was also notable for her roles as Mrs Hutchinson in The Liver Birds and as Nellie Harvey, a rival landlady to Annie Walker (Doris Speed), in Coronation Street.

== Early life ==
Sugden was born on 21 July 1922 in Keighley, West Riding of Yorkshire, the younger child of Mary (née Shackleton; 1882–1962) and Willie Sugden (1876–1952); she had an elder brother, John (1907–1970).

Sugden began performing at four years old, when at a family Christmas party she repeated a poem that she had learnt from a woman at a village concert; her family's positive reaction made her realise "how wonderful it was to make people laugh. After leaving school Sugden worked in a munitions factory, making shells for the British Royal Navy during World War II. Once the war was over and she was released from the factory Sugden attended the Guildhall School of Music and Drama in London.

== Early career ==
When Sugden graduated from the Guildhall School of Music and Drama, she worked in repertory for eight years with a company that included Eric Sykes and Roy Dotrice. She also had work in radio and made her television debut in a live half-hour comedy show. Sugden's other appearances before Are You Being Served? included parts in The Benny Hill Show, Just Jimmy (with Jimmy Clitheroe), Z-Cars, Up Pompeii!, The Goodies, Steptoe and Son and five episodes of Jackanory in 1968.

== Television ==
Sugden's first regular sitcom role was as Mrs Crispin in the sitcom Hugh and I (1962–1967). This was written by John T. Chapman, and when he became involved with The Liver Birds series, he suggested Sugden for the role of Sandra's mother, Mrs Hutchinson. She appeared in the bulk of the run, from 1971 to 1979.

In 1973, she appeared in Son of the Bride.

Meanwhile, aged 50 she was cast in a role which brought her international fame: Mrs Slocombe, a department store saleswoman with a socially superior attitude, a repertoire of double entendres, and a penchant for bouffant, pastel-coloured coiffures, in the long-running Are You Being Served? (1972–1985). In 1978, she was the lead star in Come Back Mrs. Noah, a sitcom that is regarded by some as one of the worst ever made. From 1965 to 1976, she intermittently played Nellie Harvey, the landlady of The Laughing Donkey pub, in Coronation Street. In this she often appeared opposite Annie Walker, landlady of the Rovers Return. In 1986, she had a 23-week stint on That's Life!

Sugden also played main roles in other sitcoms, including That's My Boy (1981–1986) and My Husband and I (1987–1988), both for ITV. In an unsuccessful revival of The Liver Birds (1996), Sugden reprised her role as Mrs Hutchinson, despite being on steroids as treatment for polymyalgia.

She played opposite her husband, William Moore (1916–2000), in several series, including two episodes of The Liver Birds and again in My Husband and I, on both occasions as a married couple. They married on 29 March 1958, having met while in repertory theatre in Swansea, and had twin sons born in October 1963, Robin and Simon. She had five grandchildren.

== Radio ==
Sugden appeared alongside Deryck Guyler in two series of the sitcom Home to Roost on BBC Radio 4 in 1974 and 1975. She also played Mrs Fox in the radio version of Dad's Army from 1975 to 1976.

== Later years and death ==
Seven years after the end of Are You Being Served?, five members of the original cast – including Sugden – came together to appear in Grace & Favour, where the staff of Grace Brothers are left an old manor house in the country, which they try to run as a hotel. It ran for two series, until 1993. Other appearances at this time included Just William and Oliver's Travels. In 2003, Sugden appeared in an episode of The Bill and also appeared (as herself) in an episode of the comedy sketch show Little Britain.

In 2002, a tribute programme called Celebrating Mollie Sugden: An Are You Being Served? Special, aired on American PBS stations featuring several members of the cast of Are You Being Served?

Sugden died on 1 July 2009, age 86, at the Royal Surrey County Hospital in Guildford, Surrey of unspecified heart failure and was cremated. Her final public appearance had been at the funeral of her Are You Being Served? co-star Wendy Richard nearly four months earlier.

== Filmography ==
=== Film ===
Year	Title	Role	Notes
1977	Are You Being Served?	Mrs. Slocombe	
1989	The BFG	Mary	Voice
1991	The Princess and the Goblin	Looti	Voice; final film role

=== Television ===
Year	Title	Role	Notes
1959	The Way of an Angel	Angel's Wife	TV film
1962	Suspense	Belle	Episode: "Killer in the Band"
1962–1966	Hugh and I	Ethel Crispin	33 episodes
1962	Benny Hill	Woman Tenant	Episode: "The Time Bicycle"
1964	First Night	Mrs. Phillips	Episode: "Maggie"
1964	Festival	Isabelle's Mother	Episode: "Ring Round the Moon"
1964–1968	Just Jimmy	Mum	9 episodes
1965; 1972–1974; 1976	Coronation Street	Nellie Harvey	23 episodes
1965	Steptoe and Son	Melanie's Mother	Episode: "And Afterwards At..."
1967	Armchair Theatre	District Nurse	Episode: "I Am Osango"
1967	Z-Cars	Vera	2 episodes
1968	Harry Worth	Audrey Bellamy	Episode: "Only Four Can Play"
1969–1970	Oh Brother!	Various	2 episodes
1969	The Very Merry Widow and How	Mrs. White	Episode: "How Are You Feeling?"
1970	The Six Wives of Henry VIII	Lotte	Episode: "Anne of Cleves"
1970	As Good Cooks Go	WRAC Sergeant	Episode: "Battle of the Bulge"
1970	Up Pompeii!	Flavia	Episode: "The Love Potion"
1970	Turkey Time	Mrs. Pike	TV film
1970	Dirty Work	Mona Flower	TV film
1970	The Goodies	Minister for Trade and Domestic Affairs	Episode: "Caught in the Act"
1971–1979; 1996	The Liver Birds	Mrs. Hutchinson	49 episodes
1971	Doctor at Large	Mrs. Mollett	2 episodes
1971	For the Love of Ada	Nellie Pollitt	2 episodes
1971	Please Sir!	Alice Larch	Episode: "What's a Class Between Friends?"
1972	Mandog	Mrs. Morris	2 episodes
1972	Comedy Playhouse	Lady Wright	Episode: "Born Every Minute"
1972	Steptoe and Son	Auntie Minnie	Episode: "Oh, What a Beautiful Mourning"
1972	Six Days of Justice	Mrs. Dunne	Episode: "A Private Nuisance"
1972	Doctor in Charge	Mrs. Waring	3 episodes
1972	Emma	Mrs. Goddard	2 episodes
1972–1985	Are You Being Served?	Mrs. Slocombe	69 episodes
1972	A Class by Himself	Lesley Charles	Episode: "Guess Who's Coming to Lunch?"
1972	My Wife Next Door	George's Mother	Episode: "Total Separation"
1972	The Fenn Street Gang	Mrs. Greer	Episode: "The Lady with the Lamp"
1973	Son of the Bride	Mum	6 episodes
1973	Billy Liar	Mrs. Bottomley	Episode: "Billy and the Party Spirit"
1974	Love Thy Neighbour	Sister Martin	Episode: "The Antenatal Clinic"
1974	Holiday with Strings	Doris	TV film
1974	Men of Affairs	Mum	Episode: "Silver Threads"
1975	Three Comedies of Marriage	Mother	Episode: "Bobby Bluesocks"
1975	The Virtuoso	Lady Gimcrack	TV film
1976	The Dick Emery Show	Blackpool Woman	Episode: #15.8
1977–1978	Come Back Mrs. Noah	Mrs. Gertrude Noah	6 episodes
1978	The Talking Parcel	Hortense the Flying Train	Voice; TV film
1979	The Tea Ladies	Char Lady	TV pilot
1981–1986	That's My Boy	Ida Willis	37 episodes
1986–1988	Tickle on the Tum	Bessie Bagwash	9 episodes
1987–1988	My Husband and I	Nora Powers	15 episodes
1991	Cluedo	Mrs. White	6 episodes
1992–1993	Grace & Favour (Are You Being Served, Again?)	Mrs. Slocombe	12 episodes
1995	Oliver's Travels	Mrs. Robson	Episode: "Why Did We Eat the Frogs?"
1995	Just William	Great Aunt Florence	Episode: "Boys Will Be Boys"
1996	Dennis the Menace	Vilhemina Slop Bucket	Voice; Episode: "Special Agent Dennis"
1996	Romuald the Reindeer	Knitting Teacher	Voice; Episode: "Knitting Patterns"
2001	Revolver	Mother	Episode: #1.0
2003	The Bill	Lally	Episode: "Professional Image"
2003	Little Britain	Mollie Sugden	Series 1, Episode 8
