= Are You Being Served? (film) =

1977 British comedy film by Bob Kellett

- British quad poster
- Directed by: Bob Kellett
- Screenplay by: David Croft; Jeremy Lloyd
- Based on: Are You Being Served? by Jeremy Lloyd and David Croft
- Produced by: Andrew Mitchell
- Starring: Mollie Sugden; John Inman; Frank Thornton; Trevor Bannister; Wendy Richard; Arthur Brough; Nicholas Smith; Arthur English; Harold Bennett
- Cinematography: Jack Atcheler
- Edited by: Al Gell
- Music by: Ronnie Hazlehurst
- Production company: Anglo-EMI
- Distributed by: EMI
- Release date: 31 July 1977
- Running time: 95 minutes
- Country: United Kingdom
- Language: English

Are You Being Served? is a 1977 British comedy film directed by Bob Kellett and written David Croft and Jeremy Lloyd, based on the 1972–85 BBC sitcom of the same name, which follows the staff of the men's and women's clothing departments of the London Grace Brothers department store.

The story is adapted from the successful stage production of the show, which played at Winter Gardens, Blackpool. The film features the performers from the television series, including Mollie Sugden, John Inman, Frank Thornton, Trevor Bannister, Arthur Brough, Wendy Richard, and Nicholas Smith.

The movie was one of the last credits for executive Nat Cohen.

== Plot ==
As the Grace Bros' department store temporary closes for refurbishment, Young Mr. Grace sends the staff on a paid holiday to the resort of "Costa Plonka", on the Spanish coast. On the first night they think they are allocated seven "penthouses" but it is in fact "tent-houses" outside the hotel – save for Mr Harman, who is given one of the hotel's luxury suites after making his booking under the "Earl of Harman", much to the chagrin of the others.

After various misfortunes and misunderstandings, the staff narrowly survive a gunfight between the revolutionaries and government troops. They are rescued by a group of tanks that arrive on the scene; revealed to have been commandeered by Young Mr Grace, who wanted to visit his beleaguered underlings, but was unable to find a taxi.

== Cast ==
- John Inman as Mr Wilberforce Clayborne Humphries, the senior sales assistant on the men's counter.
- Mollie Sugden as Mrs Betty Slocombe, the head of the ladies department and the film's main female protagonist.
- Frank Thornton as Captain Stephen Peacock, the floorwalker at Grace Brothers.
- Trevor Bannister as Mr Dick Lucas, the junior of the men's department.
- Wendy Richard as Miss Shirley Brahms, the Cockney junior of the ladies' department and Mrs Slocombe's friend.
- Arthur Brough as Mr Ernest Grainger, the head of the men's department and the oldest member of the staff. This was Arthur Brough's last appearance as Mr Grainger as he died before filming of series 6 began.
- Nicholas Smith as Mr Cuthbert Rumbold, the manager of the floor.
- Harold Bennett as Young Mr Grace, the elderly head of Grace Brothers department store.
- Arthur English as Mr Beverley Harman, the head of the packing department.
- Karan David as Conchita, a young waitress who works at the hotel.
- Glyn Houston as Cesar Rodriguez, a terrorist with a crush on Mrs Slocombe.
- Andrew Sachs as Don Carlos Bernardo, the moderately dishonest hotel manager, and Cesar's unwilling accomplice.
- Derek Griffiths as the Emir.
- Nadim Sawalha and Sheila Steafel as various Grace Brothers customers.
- Penny Irving as Miss Nicholson, Mr Grace's new secretary.
- Raymond Bowers as Henry, the barber at Grace Brothers.
- Paul Grist as the Customs Officer

== Production ==
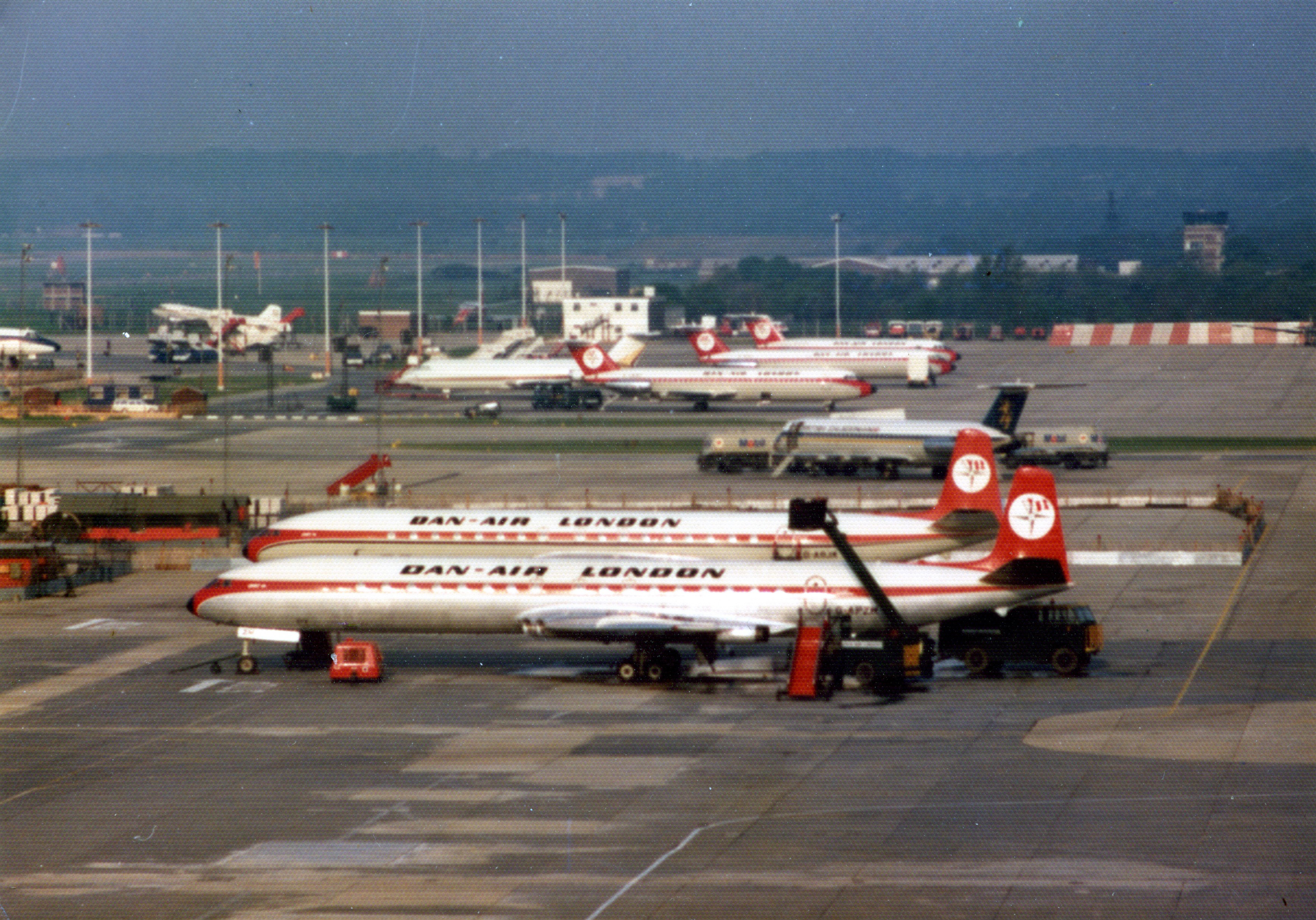
Location filming took place at London Gatwick Airport and on board a Dan-Air Comet 4C aircraft for the flight departure scene

EMI Films had enjoyed success adapting a number of TV shows into films such as On the Buses, Up Pompeii!, Steptoe and Son and The Sweeney. It approached Jeremy Lloyd and David Croft to adapt Are You Being Served? into a film. The writers agreed and decided to use plot from a stage show they had already written based on the sitcom. The stage show had been presented in Blackpool 1976 by Bernard Delfont who was head of EMI. The stage show had been successful but was expensive to produce because of its large number of characters.

The job of directing the film went to Bob Kellett who had made a number of comedies for EMI including Up Pompeii and Spanish Fly. "At first the cast found it strange having someone intrude into their happy family," said Kellett. “But they were a wonderful team and quickly got used to me as the director, particularly when they began realizing that working on a film requires a different discipline and I could help."

The film was mostly shot at Elstree Studios with one day of filming at London Gatwick Airport. The tight budget meant the unit could not go on location to Spain, so the resort had to be recreated on the backlot. Frank Thomson recalled, "I didn’t think it [the film] was very good; there wasn’t enough money spent on it. In the film the characters had to sleep in tents because all the rooms were full, but when you see the dining-room or the reception desk, the place is empty — there could at least have been a few other visitors strolling around making it look less deserted."

== Release ==
The film opened in British cinemas from 31 July 1977 onwards.

== Reception ==
=== Box office ===
Kellett recalled the film being "fairly successful." David Croft said "It was made entirely in a studio and it shows. It didn’t make much money, but if it had been handled differently, I believe it could have. I felt it was badly distributed. But even though it wasn’t terribly well made, it was funny." Jeremy Lloyd called the movie "moderately successful, even if it didn’t make us much money." Lloyd and Croft took a percentage of the profits, but never received any.

=== Critical ===
In a contemporary review, John Pym of the Monthly Film Bulletin gave the film a negative review, stating that "The humour consists mainly of a withering selection of patent British puns; an inflatable brassiere, some let's-insult-the-Germans jokes and a rickety thunder-box which bolts from the outside are thrown in for good measure."

In a retrospective review, DVD Verdict's Michael Stailey regards it as a film that is "guilty of violating almost every law of comedy and film." The film is widely considered to be lacking in originality, plot, and focus. At present, the film holds a 60% positive rating on Rotten Tomatoes; the cutoff for a positive rating is 59%.

== Notes ==
- Webber, Richard (1998). Are you being served? : a celebration of twenty-five years. Welcome Rain.
