= Romuald the Reindeer =

- Genre: Animated
- Created by: Robin Lyons; Andrew Offiler
- Written by: Roger Planer; Robin Lyons; Andrew Offiler
- Directed by: Wayne Thomas
- Voices of: Nigel Planer; Julie Higginson; Arthur Smith; Emma Wray; Kenneth Waller; Howell Evens; Jonathan Kydd; Christian Rodska
- Theme music composer: Roger Planer
- Countries of origin: United Kingdom; France
- Original language: English
- No. of seasons: 1
- No. of episodes: 13

Production
- Executive producers: Patrick Moine; Mikael Shields; Steve Walsh
- Production companies: Siriol Productions; La Fabrique; EVA Entertainment

Original release
- Network: BBC1, TCC, CBBC, ZDF, France 3
- Release: 24 September – 20 December 1996

Romuald the Reindeer is a short-lived British children's animated series, created by Robin Lyons and Andrew Offiler, and produced by Siriol Productions, France 3 and La Fabrique in association with EVA Entertainment, BBC and ZDF in 1996. It aired on the BBC on 24 September 1996 and focuses on the adventures of a Christmas reindeer named Romuald, a character who had previously appeared in Siriol Productions and La Fabrique's thirty-minute specials Santa and the Tooth Fairies and Santa's First Christmas and an episode of their television series Tales of the Tooth Fairies. The series ran for a single season, consisting of thirteen ten-minute episodes.

== Synopsis ==
The series takes place in Reindeersville, Lapland, a community of Christmas reindeer. The reindeer populace can all fly, and use their antlers like hands, playing instruments, picking up phones, etc. The focus is on Romuald Haroldson, a sullen teen reindeer, and his misadventures.

== Production ==
The series was first announced on December 20, 1994 and began production in 1995.

== Characters ==
- Romuald Haroldson (voiced by Nigel Planer) – A teenage Christmas reindeer. Melancholy, woebegone, and always carrying around a sledful of teen angst, Romuald suffers life's twists and turns more than most, although things usually work out for him in the end.
- Ulrika Haroldson (voiced by Julie Higginson) – Romuald's three-and-a-half-year-old younger sister. She usually gets her own way at home, and loves to pester her older brother.
- Harold and Hilda Haroldson (voiced by Jonathan Kydd and Emma Wray) – Romuald and Ulrika's parents. Harold is your average working Reindeer, whilst Hilda is knitting mad. Both are clueless towards their son's angst-ridden attitude, and powerless to say "no" to Ulrika's demands-usually.
- Grandpa Ivy (voiced by Kenneth Waller) – A senior member of Santa's elves. He tends to the sheep around Lapland, and teaches classes at the reindeer school.
- Clint, Kirk and Burt (voiced by Arthur Smith, Jonathan Kydd and Christian Rodska) – the local reindeer bullies, determined to make life miserable for everyone, particularly Romuald. All three wear leather jackets. Clint wears shades, Kirk wears a cap over his antlers, Burt has a permanent black eye and his antlers wear boxing gloves.

== Episodes ==
1. Baby Sitter (24 September 1996)
2. Deerwatch (1 October 1996)
3. Flee on the Wall (8 October 1996)
4. Migration World (15 October 1996)
5. Knitted Patterns (22 October 1996)
6. Reindeer School (29 October 1996)
7. Ulrika's Solo Flight (5 November 1996)
8. Camping Trip (12 November 1996)
9. Space Reindeer (19 November 1996)
10. Computer Whizz (3 December 1996)
11. Pet Swap (10 December 1996)
12. Pen Pals (17 December 1996)
13. Music Maestro (20 December 1996)

== Home release ==
A single video, entitled Adventures With Romuald the Reindeer was released, containing the episodes "Music Maestro", "Computer Whizz", "Space Reindeer", "Reindeer School" and "Baby Sitter".
