= Floorwalker =

Senior employee in a large store with supervisory responsibilities

A floorwalker is a senior employee in a large store (usually a department store) who supervises sales staff, in addition to directing and assisting customers and resolving complaints and returns. Until the early twentieth century, when formal training came into vogue, the floorwalker would often be responsible for training new sales staff.

== History ==
The first floorwalkers were employed at Selfridges, which opened in 1909. Gamages was another department store in which floorwalkers were used.

In the late twentieth century, the use of floorwalkers declined, owing to the introduction of self-service. However, in recent years, the concept of the floorwalker has returned to several department stores, including Macy's, Showfields and Nordstrom.

== Cultural depictions ==
- Charlie Chaplin had his Tramp character impersonate a floorwalker in the 1916 silent comedy film The Floorwalker.
- Captain Stephen Peacock is a regular character who held that position in the British television sitcom Are You Being Served?.
