= Harold Bennett =

English actor (1898–1981)

- Bennett during his military service in World War I
- Born: Harold Frank Bennett; 17 November 1898; Hastings, Sussex, England
- Died: 11 September 1981 (aged 82); London, England
- Occupation: Actor
- Years active: 1910–1981
- Children: 3

Harold Frank Bennett (17 November 1898 – 11 September 1981) was an English actor, active in stage, television and film best remembered for being in sitcoms written and produced by David Croft, having played 'Young Mr. Grace' in the 1970s British sitcom Are You Being Served?, as well as minor character Sidney Bluett in Dad's Army.

== Biography ==
Bennett was born in Hastings, Sussex. After leaving school at the age of twelve, in his early life he toured America as a clown with a circus, and later taught English at the Working Men's College in London. During World War I he served as a courier, initially on horseback, then on motorcycle. After the war he took up acting and eventually worked as stage producer in the Tower Theatre, London. He subsequently pursued a career as a draughtsman for an electric company, only taking up his acting career again following retirement.

Harold Bennett died of a heart attack on 11 September 1981, aged 82. His wife predeceased him in the 1930s; he was survived by their three children. One of his children, John, was also an actor.

== Acting career ==
He played the recurring character Mr (Sidney) Bluett in Dad's Army from 1969 to 1977, but it was as Young Mr Grace, the ancient, amiably callous owner of Grace Brothers department store in British sitcom Are You Being Served? that he achieved his greatest fame. His last appearance in Are You Being Served? aired some three months after his death, having been recorded earlier in the year.

Bennett also played the role of the aged Archdeacon Pulteney in The Stalls of Barchester, the BBC A Ghost Story for Christmas broadcast 24 December 1971 and adapted from M.R. James's story of the same title. Bennett also appeared in Vote, Vote, Vote for Nigel Barton (1965), and in several films, including as a photographer in Games That Lovers Play (1971) and as the aged odd-job man Gasper in The Ups and Downs of a Handyman (1975).

On the stage, he appeared in a Royal Shakespeare Company production of London Assurance (1972) as Martin, and in an Open University production of Chekhov's The Three Sisters.

== Filmography ==
=== Film ===
Year	Title	Role	Ref.
1967	The Sky Bike	Old Man	
1971	Games That Lovers Play	Old photographer	
1972	Au Pair Girls	Lord Tryke	
1973	Adolf Hitler - My Part in His Downfall	Doctor	
1976	The Ups and Downs of a Handyman	Gasper	
1977	Are You Being Served?	Young Mr. Grace	

=== Television ===
Year	Title	Role	Notes
1965	Vote, Vote, Vote for Nigel Barton	Old man	TV play by Dennis Potter
1969–1977	Dad's Army	Sidney Bluett	13 episodes
1971	Whack-O!	Mr Dinwiddie	13 episodes
1971	The Stalls of Barchester	Archdeacon Pulteney	
1972	Upstairs Downstairs	Bookshop assistant	Episode: "Magic Casements"
1972–1981	Are You Being Served?	"Young" Mr Grace	46 episodes
1973	Thriller	Second old man	Episodes: "A Place To Die"
1976	Thriller	Blind man	Episode: "The Next Victim"
1976–1977	Clayhanger	Mr Shushions	4 episodes
1977	Jesus of Nazareth	Elder (uncredited)	TV mini-series
1978	Come Back Mrs Noah	The Priest	Episode: "Who Goes Home?"
1980	Oh Happy Band!	Vicar	4 episodes
