= Nicholas Smith (actor) =

English actor (1934–2015)

- Smith c. 1992
- Born: Nicholas John Smith; 5 March 1934; Banstead, Surrey, England
- Died: 6 December 2015 (aged 81); Sutton, London, England
- Occupation: Actor
- Years active: 1960–2012
- Television: Are You Being Served?
- Spouse: Mary Smith
- Children: Catherine Russell

Nicholas John Smith (5 March 1934 – 6 December 2015) was an English comedian and actor. He appeared in the BBC sitcom Are You Being Served?, playing Mr (Cuthbert) Rumbold, the manager of the fictional Grace Brothers department store.

== Early life ==
Smith, the son of a chartered surveyor, attended a preparatory school and St John's School, Leatherhead. He served with the Royal Army Service Corps in Aldershot during his national service. He learned to play musical instruments, studied singing and trained as an actor at RADA. He then appeared in repertory theatres, on the West End stage, at the Bristol Old Vic and on Broadway.

== Roles ==
Smith's earliest TV roles were as a non-speaking extra in various ITV programmes. He had his first speaking role in the BBC's Doctor Who serial The Dalek Invasion of Earth (1964). Smith persuaded the serial's director, Richard Martin, to expand the role so that his character, Wells, appeared in three of the serial's six episodes instead of only one or two as originally scripted. This was followed by small roles in many other adventure series, such as The Saint, The Avengers, The Champions and Ace of Wands. In 1969 he appeared in the television period drama The First Churchills as the historical figure of Titus Oates. In 1971 in the series Budgie episode "Some Mother's Sons" as Detective Sergeant Clooney.

=== Are You Being Served? ===
Are You Being Served? began with a pilot episode in 1972, with Smith playing Mr Cuthbert "Jug Ears" Rumbold, the manager of the menswear and ladieswear departments in a large fictional London store called Grace Brothers.

Smith remained with the programme until the end of its run in 1985, as well as appearing in the Are You Being Served? spin-off film in 1977 and the sitcom's sequel, Grace & Favour (also known as Are You Being Served? Again! in the United States), in 1992 and 1993. Following the death of Frank Thornton on 16 March 2013, Smith was the last surviving member of the original cast of Are You Being Served? The last surviving principal actor was Mike Berry, who joined the cast beginning in 1981 for series 8 in the role of Mr Spooner following actor Trevor Bannister's departure from the series. He died on 11 April 2025.

=== Other roles ===
From September 1972, in contrast to his contemporaneous work in Are You Being Served?, he also had a semi-regular role as PC Jeff Yates in the series Z-Cars. His last appearance as Yates was in February 1975. His film work included appearances in Salt and Pepper (1968), A Walk with Love and Death (1969), The Champions-Project Zero (1969), The Twelve Chairs (1970), dubbed in an Italian version of The Canterbury Tales (1972) directed by Pier Paolo Pasolini, and The Adventure of Sherlock Holmes' Smarter Brother (1975) as Hunkston, Sigerson Holmes' servant. He played Mr. Simpkins (a miserable and desperately unattractive leisure centre manager who had rings run around him by two lazy, womanising Australian criminals who had taken jobs in the leisure centre as a cover for their crimes) in The Sweeney, episode Golden Fleece in 1975.

In 1979, he appeared in Worzel Gummidge as Mr Foster, the headmaster of the school.

In 1986 he played Sir John Treymayne in the British tour of Me and My Girl, a role played in the West End by his Are You Being Served? co-star Frank Thornton. In 1987 he joined the cast on And There's More and was paired up with Joan Sims for a number of sketches for each episodes as an old couple.

He appeared in the TV mini-series Martin Chuzzlewit. In 2005, Smith featured in a supporting role as vicar Clement Hedges in the Academy Award-winning film Wallace & Gromit: The Curse of the Were-Rabbit, for which he was nominated for an Annie Award for Voice Acting in a Feature Production. In 2008, he appeared as a vicar in Last of the Summer Wine.

In 2010, he appeared in children's TV programme M.I. High as Professor Quakermass. Smith also wrote music and poetry.

== Personal life and death ==
Smith was the father of actress Catherine Russell. He died on 6 December 2015 following seven weeks of hospitalisation for a head injury from a fall at his home in Sutton, London.

== Partial filmography ==
- Partners in Crime (1961) - Pawn Shop Assistant
- Doctor Who (1964, season 2) - Resistant
- Those Magnificent Men in Their Flying Machines (1965) - Fireman (uncredited)
- Salt and Pepper (1968) - Constable
- The Saint - "The Fiction-Makers" (1968) - Bishop
- A Walk with Love and Death (1969) - Pilgrim
- The Champions- "Project Zero" (1969) - Postmaster.
- The Twelve Chairs (1970) - Actor in Play
- The Canterbury Tales (1972) - Friar
- Are You Being Served? (1972) - Mr. Rumbold
- Baxter! (1973) - 1st Taxi Driver
- Frankenstein and the Monster from Hell (1974) - Death Wish (uncredited)
- Village Hall - “The Magic Sponge” (1974) - Brian Good
- The Adventure of Sherlock Holmes' Smarter Brother (1975) - Hunkston
- Are You Being Served? (1977) - Mr. Rumbold
- Grace & Favour (1992) - Mr. Rumbold
- Martin Chuzzlewit (1994) - Mr. Spottletoe
- What Rats Won't Do (1998) - Chaplain
- Wallace & Gromit: The Curse of the Were-Rabbit (2005) - Reverend Clement Hedges (voice), Nominated - Annie Award for Voice Acting in a Feature Production
- Every Hidden Thing (2006) - Abel
