= John Inman =

English actor, comedian and singer (1935–2007)

- Inman as Mr. Humphries in Are You Being Served?
- Born: Frederick John Inman; 28 June 1935; Preston, Lancashire, England, UK
- Died: 8 March 2007 (aged 71); Paddington, London, England, UK
- Education: Cambridge House
- Occupations: Actor; comedian; singer
- Years active: 1948–2004
- Television: Odd Man Out; Are You Being Served?; Take a Letter, Mr. Jones; Grace & Favour
- Partner: Ron Lynch (1972–2007; cp. 2005–2007)

Frederick John Inman (28 June 1935 – 8 March 2007) was an English actor, comedian and singer best known for his role as Mr. Humphries in Are You Being Served?, a British sitcom between 1972 and 1985, and the spin-off series Grace and Favour (also titled Are You Being Served? Again!). He was the only actor from those series to reprise the role when an Australian version was launched.

In 1976, Inman was named both BBC TV Personality of the Year and TV Times readers' Funniest Man on Television. He was also a well-known character actor in the United Kingdom as a pantomime dame.

== Early life ==
Frederick John Inman was born on 28 June 1935 in Preston, Lancashire, and was often said to be a cousin of actress Josephine Tewson, though she denied they were related. (They did, however, play half-siblings in the 1977 sitcom Odd Man Out.) At the age of 12, Inman moved with his parents to Blackpool where his mother ran a boarding house, while his father owned a hairdressing business. As a child, he enjoyed dressmaking. He was educated at Cambridge House in Preston, and then a secondary modern school. Inman always wanted to be an actor, and his parents paid for him to have elocution lessons at the local church hall.

At the age of 13, he made his stage debut in the Pavilion on Blackpool's South Pier, in a melodrama entitled Freda. Aged 15, he took a job at the pier, making tea, clearing up and playing parts in plays.

After leaving school, Inman worked for two years at Fox's, a gentlemen's outfitters in Blackpool, specialising in window dressing. Aged 17, he moved to London to join retailer Austin Reed in Regent Street. Four years later, he left Austin Reed to become a scenic artist with Kenneth Kendall's touring company at a theatre in Crewe, so that he could earn his Equity Card, required at the time for professional actors.

== Theatre career ==
Inman made his West End debut in the 1960s when he appeared in Ann Veronica at the Cambridge Theatre. He appeared as the pop singer Willie in Dennis Spencer's What a Racket at Manchester's Palace Theatre in December 1963 and appeared in Paula Stone's How Now Brown Cow at the Lyric Theatre, Hammersmith, in late 1965. By 1975, his television fame was such that he was also a starring attraction in the long-running Let's Get Laid at London's Windmill Theatre. The same year he appeared in Salad Days at the Windmill, and as Lord Fancourt Babberley in Charley's Aunt at the Adelphi Theatre in 1979.

During the sixties, Inman won a reputation alongside Barry Howard as one of the most celebrated Ugly Sister acts in pantomime and throughout later years established himself as one of the country's best-loved dames in such familiar pantomimes as Mother Goose, Babes in the Wood, Aladdin and Jack and the Beanstalk. His other stage appearances included many summer shows and his own show, Fancy Free, and Pyjama Tops, My Fat Friend and Bedside Manners.

== Television and film career ==
Inman made his television debut in 1965 in the sitcom A Slight Case Of... titled The Enemy Within. In 1966, he appeared in two episodes of the BBC sitcom Hugh and I. In 1970, he acted in one episode of the ITV sitcom Two in Clover. In 1972, as a theatre job ended and he prepared to return to work in a department store, David Croft asked Inman to play a part in a Comedy Playhouse pilot called Are You Being Served?. This was a sitcom set in a department store, written by Croft with Jeremy Lloyd, based on the latter's experiences working at Simpsons of Piccadilly. Playing a minor role with only a few lines, he was soon asked to "camp it up", despite initial reluctance from the BBC to include such a camp character. The pilot went unused; it was finally broadcast in September 1972, when the BBC had programming gaps during the Munich massacre. Audience response was strong enough to commission a five-episode series, which followed the first series in early 1973. The first series was scheduled opposite Coronation Street on ITV and attracted little attention, though repeats later that year proved very successful.

Inman played the sharp-tongued sales assistant Mr. Wilberforce Claybourne Humphries, and his earlier career in the clothes retail business was good preparation for this role in a menswear department. Inman developed a characteristic limp-wristed mincing walk – reportedly lifted from a window dresser he had worked with – and a high-pitched catchphrase, "I'm free!", which soon entered popular culture. Inman reported that four or five members of the group Campaign for Homosexual Equality picketed one of his shows in protest as they believed his persona did not help their cause. Inman said: "They thought I was over exaggerating the gay character. But I don't think I do. In fact there are people far more camp than Mr. Humphries walking around this country. Anyway, I know for a fact that an enormous number of viewers like Mr. Humphries and don't really care whether he's camp or not. So far from doing harm to the homosexual image, I feel I might be doing some good." Both Inman and David Croft stated that the character was "just a mother's boy", and that his sexual orientation was never explicitly stated. Inman continued to play in live shows after his success as Mr. Humphries, and began to incorporate camp mannerisms to those performances too, once saying "Even when I'm not playing Mr. Humphries, say at a summer season, I camp it up a bit. If I don't, the audience are disappointed."

Are You Being Served? ran for ten series until 1985. At its peak in 1979 it attracted British audiences of 22 million viewers while Inman's portrayal of Mr. Humphries made him a household name. The series also became popular in the United States, where Inman became a gay cultural icon. Once, in San Francisco, a passing cyclist spotted Inman and fell off his bicycle in surprise, crying "Mr. Humphries, I love you!"

Between 1975 and 1977, DJM Records released five singles by Inman, usually in character as Mr. Humphries. "Are You Being Served, Sir?" reached number 39 in the UK singles chart. He released an LP of the same name, and two further albums: I'm Free in 1977 and With a Bit of Brass in 1978. His single "Teddy Bears' Picnic" was regularly playlisted on BBC Radio 1/Radio 2 Saturday morning children's show Ed Stewart's Junior Choice in the late 1970s and included on the show's official BBC soundtrack album.

From 1980 to 1981, Inman also played Mr Humphries in the Australian version of Are You Being Served?, the only cast member of the original British series to do so. He made many appearances on BBC TV's long-running television show, The Good Old Days. During the 69-episode, 13-year run of Are You Being Served?, Inman also appeared in the 1977 film of the series, in which the characters visited the fictional Spanish holiday resort of "Costa Plonka". In Odd Man Out (1977), his own sitcom, Inman played the owner of a fish and chip shop who inherits half of a rock factory; and Take a Letter, Mr. Jones (1981), a sitcom in which Inman played Graham Jones, who is secretary to Rula Lenska's character Joan Warner.

He made a cameo appearance in the film The Tall Guy (1989), and was one of five of the Are You Being Served? cast to be reunited in character for the sitcom Grace & Favour (titled Are You Being Served? Again! in the United States), which ran for twelve episodes in 1992 and 1993. Inman had a small part as Lady Capulet in the film Shakespeare in Love (1998) and appeared in the 1999 French and Saunders Christmas special. He appeared as Father Chinwag in the film The Mumbo Jumbo (2000).

== Later years, illness and death ==
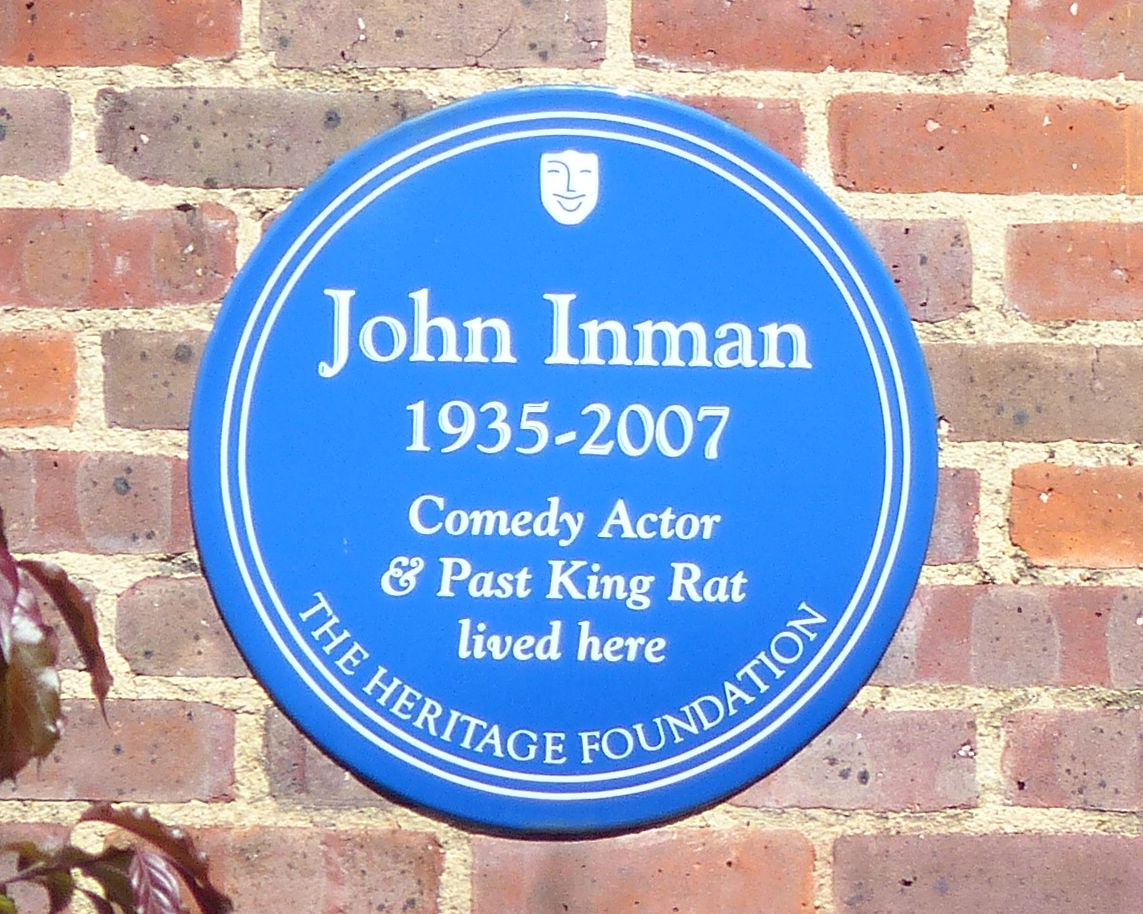
A blue plaque commemorates John Inman on his former home

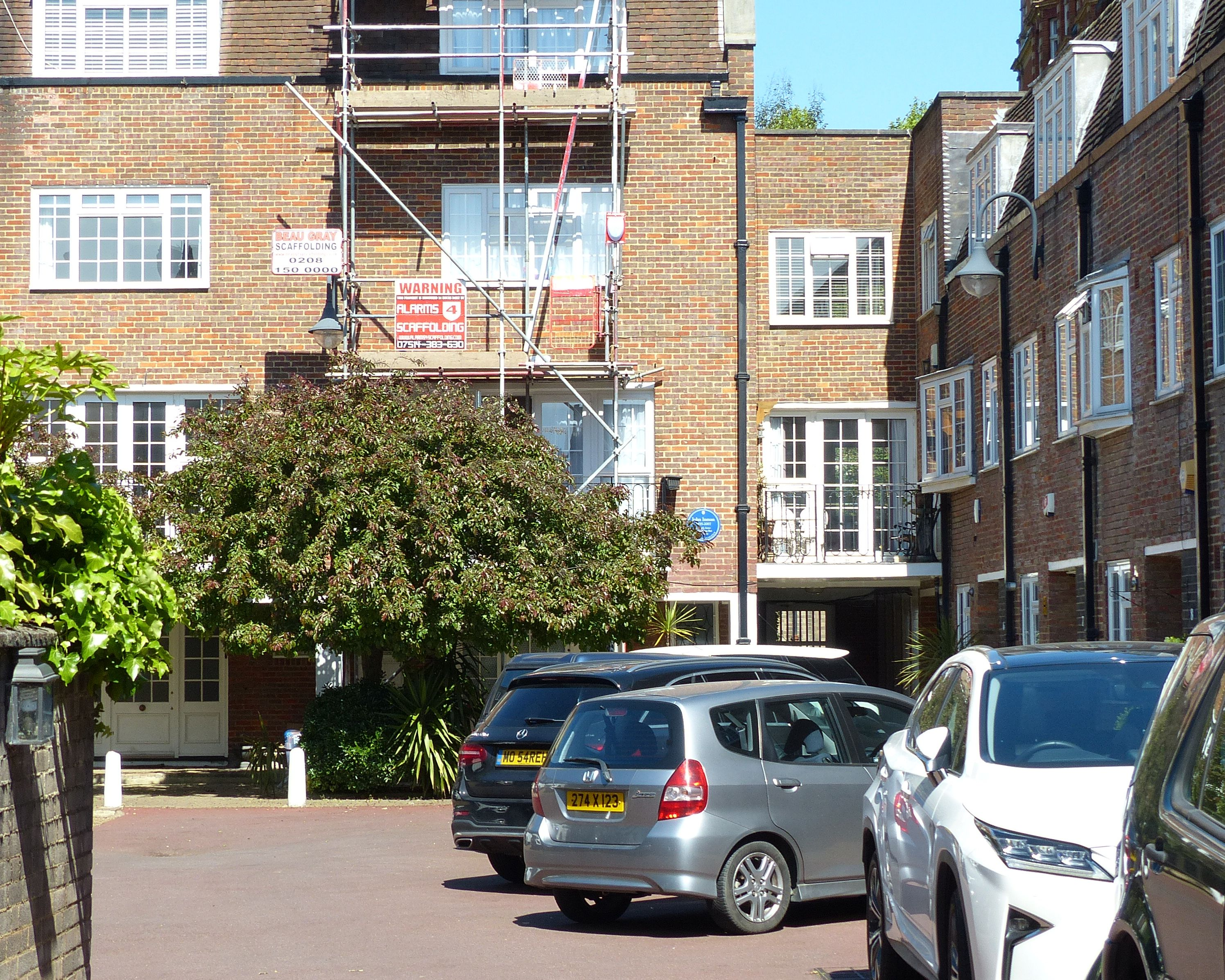
John Inman's former house in Little Venice, London

Inman toured Australia, starring in a number of productions including Bedside Manners (2003) and a revival of Are You Being Served? (2001) as a stage show at Twelfth Night Theatre, Brisbane. In 2004, he made additional television appearances in Doctors and Revolver.

Inman suffered from poor health in his later years. He was hospitalised with bronchitis in 1993, and collapsed on stage in 1995. He was admitted to Paddington's St Mary's Hospital in 2001 after suffering breathing difficulties and spent three days in intensive care.

In December 2004, Inman was forced to cancel an appearance in a pantomime as he was suffering from a hepatitis A infection, contracted from contaminated food.

Inman died early in the morning of 8 March 2007, aged 71, at St Mary's Hospital, Paddington, London, of an infection. His body was cremated at Golders Green Crematorium after a funeral on 23 March 2007.

== Personal life ==
For some thirty years, Inman lived in a mews house in Little Venice, Paddington. On 23 December 2005, at the Westminster register office, he entered into a civil partnership with his partner of 33 years, Ron Lynch. In his will, he left nearly all of his estate, valued at more than £2.8 million, to Lynch.

Inman served as King Rat, the head of the Grand Order of Water Rats (a London-based British entertainment industry fraternity and charitable organisation), in 1993.

== Filmography ==
Year	Title	Role	Notes
1965	A Slight Case of...		Episode: "The Enemy Within"
1966	Hugh and I		2 episodes
1970	Two in Clover	Bowler	1 episode
1972–1985	Are You Being Served?	Mr. Humphries	69 episodes
1977	Odd Man Out	Neville Sutcliffe	7 episodes
1977	Are You Being Served?	Mr. Humphries	Film based on UK TV series
1980–1981	Are You Being Served?	Mr. Humphries	16 episodes – Australian adaptation
1981	Take a Letter, Mr. Jones	Graham Jones	6 episodes
1989	The Tall Guy	John Inman	
1989	Family Fortunes	Fanny the Ugly Sister	1 episode
1992–1993	Grace & Favour	Mr Humphries	12 episodes
1995	Call up the Stars	Frank Randle	TV movie
1998	Shakespeare in Love	Lady Capulet in play	Uncredited
1999	French and Saunders	Darth Sid	1 episode
2000	Full Mountie	Tailor	1 episode
2000	The Mumbo Jumbo	Father Chinwag	
2004	Revolver	The Antiques Dealer	5 episodes
2004	Doctors	Teddy	Episode: "Intolerance"
