= Are You Being Served? =

British TV sitcom (1972–1985)

- Typical intertitle
- Genre: Sitcom
- Created by: Jeremy Lloyd; David Croft
- Written by: Jeremy Lloyd; David Croft; Michael Knowles; John Chapman; Derren Litten (2016)
- Directed by: David Croft; Bernard Thompson; Harold Snoad; Ray Butt; Gordon Elsbury; John Kilby; Martin Shardlow
- Starring: Mollie Sugden; John Inman; Frank Thornton; Wendy Richard; Nicholas Smith; Trevor Bannister; Arthur Brough; Larry Martyn; Harold Bennett; Arthur English; James Hayter; Alfie Bass; Mike Berry; Kenneth Waller; Milo Sperber; Benny Lee; Candy Davis
- Theme music composer: Ronnie Hazlehurst
- Country of origin: United Kingdom
- Original language: English
- No. of series: 10
- No. of episodes: 70 (list of episodes)

Production
- Executive producer: David Croft
- Producers: David Croft; Harold Snoad; Bob Spiers; Martin Shardlow
- Camera setup: Multi-camera
- Running time: 30 minutes
- Production company: BBC

Original release
- Network: BBC1
- Release: 8 September 1972 – 1 April 1985

Related
- Comedy Playhouse; Are You Being Served? (film); Are You Being Served? (Australian TV series); Beane's of Boston; Grace & Favour

Are You Being Served? is a British television sitcom that was broadcast from 1972 to 1985. It was created and written by Jeremy Lloyd and David Croft, with Croft also serving as executive producer and director. Michael Knowles and John Chapman also co-wrote certain episodes with Lloyd and Croft. Produced by the BBC, the series originally starred Mollie Sugden, Trevor Bannister, Frank Thornton, John Inman, Wendy Richard, Arthur Brough, Nicholas Smith, Larry Martyn and Harold Bennett, with Arthur English, James Hayter, Alfie Bass, Mike Berry, Kenneth Waller and Candy Davis taking subsequent roles. Set in London, the show followed the staff of the retail ladies' and gentlemen's clothing departments in the flagship department store of the fictional Grace Brothers, a stuffy and old-fashioned establishment constantly out of step with the times.

The series was broadcast on the BBC for 10 series, totalling 69 episodes between 8 September 1972 and 1 April 1985, including five Christmas specials. A ratings hit with UK audiences, it gained international attention when broadcast in several other English-speaking countries, including Canada, New Zealand, Australia, the Republic of Ireland, and the United States. A feature film of the same title was released in 1977, and a spin-off television series, Grace & Favour, ran from 1992 to 1993 with the same main cast. In 2004, Are You Being Served? was ranked 20th in a television countdown of Britain's Best Sitcom. A one-off revival episode with a new cast was created in 2016. The sitcom (including its pilot and Christmas specials), the spin-off and the film have since been released on DVD.

== Premise ==
Are You Being Served? depicts the work (and occasionally personal) lives of the staff of a fictional London department store, Grace Brothers. Its main characters serve in the ladies' and gentlemen's departments, alongside their senior staff, maintenance workers and the store's owner. Plots generally focused on the relationships among staff, their attempts to improve sales (being chronically underpaid), and the effects of local events that impacted the store's running.

A key humorous aspect of the series was its parody of the British class system, which permeated the interactions among management, sales personnel and the maintenance staff. The episodes rarely featured locations outside the store, with most of the action taking place on the shop floor and in the staff-only areas. Characters rarely addressed each other by their first names, even after work, instead using their surnames in the manner of "Mr", "Miss", or "Mrs".

The sitcom featured humour based on sexual innuendo, misunderstanding, mistaken identity, farce, and occasional slapstick. In addition, there were sight gags generated by outrageous costumes that the characters were sometimes required to wear for store promotions, and gaudy store displays featuring malfunctioning robotic mannequins. The show is remembered for its prolific use of double entendres.

== Production ==
=== Programme conception ===
The idea for the show came from Lloyd's brief period of employment in the early 1950s at Simpsons of Piccadilly, a clothing store which traded for over 60 years until its closure in 1999. The inspiration for the store has also been credited to the former Clements store in Watford, where the concept of the floorwalker character, Captain Peacock, was devised.

=== Broadcast ===
Logo used for the pilot episode and series one; from series two onwards, the quotation marks were removed.

Are You Being Served? was originally produced as a standalone pilot episode for the BBC Television Comedy Playhouse series, but the episode was not selected for broadcast. During the 1972 Summer Olympics, television coverage of the games was interrupted by the Munich massacre. The BBC, faced with a gap in the schedules, selected the unused pilot episode to fill a 30-minute slot on Friday 8 September. The episode was not well received by critics, but David Croft's reputation as a writer enabled him to gain support from the BBC's Head of Light Entertainment, Bill Cotton, to turn the pilot into a series. After Croft agreed to a limited budget and a short production schedule, a first series of five further episodes was commissioned. The series was broadcast with the repeated pilot episode as episode one on Wednesday 14 March 1973. Cotton expressed some dissatisfaction with the character of Mr Humphries, and reportedly told Croft to "get rid of the poof". Croft refused to alter his scripts and threatened to quit, telling Cotton: "If the poof goes, I go".

The first series was initially aired in a Wednesday timeslot, in competition with the ITV soap opera Coronation Street. As a consequence, Are You Being Served? received relatively little attention, but when the BBC later repeated the show in a Friday evening primetime slot, its popularity soared.

The sitcom was recorded at BBC Television Centre in London in front of a live studio audience, on two main adjoining sets, the Grace Bros shop floor and the staff canteen. The cast and crew rehearsed and filmed one episode each week.

After a successful 13-year run, Are You Being Served? came to an end on 1 April 1985.

Of the original cast, only John Inman, Mollie Sugden, Frank Thornton, Wendy Richard and Nicholas Smith appeared in all 69 episodes. The same five later featured in the sequel sitcom, Grace & Favour (also known as Are You Being Served? Again!). The cast performed in character for a stage sketch on the BBC1 programme Variety on 19 June 1976.

=== Restoration of the 1972 pilot ===
Although the pilot was produced in colour, the videotape was wiped in the 1970s, leaving only a 16mm black-and-white film telerecording, which was made for international syndication to countries where colour television broadcasts had not yet been adopted. In 2009, the pilot episode was restored to colour using the colour recovery technique previously used for the Dad's Army episode "Room at the Bottom". The restored colour version was first shown on BBC2 on 1 January 2010 as part of a special Are You Being Served? night. As of 2026, the colour version has yet to be released on DVD or Blu-ray.

=== Character development ===
The 1972 Comedy Playhouse pilot had originally been conceived with Mr Lucas as the lead character, providing a vehicle for Trevor Bannister's acting career. In the early episodes, Lloyd and Croft recognised that the characters of Mr Humphries and Mrs Slocombe were raising the most laughter from the studio audience, and as a result they became breakout characters, receiving the best lines in the scripts of the new series. The phrase "I'm free!" was first spoken by Mrs Slocombe in the pilot. John Inman reportedly first used the phrase behind the scenes which amused his colleagues so much that Mollie Sugden suggested to the writers that Inman should be given the line in future scripts. Inman developed "I'm free!" as his camp catchphrase in Series 2, and it rapidly became one of the most popular catchphrases in British comedy.

=== Theme tune ===
"Are You Being Served?" theme

The theme tune, written by the show's co-writer David Croft and composer Ronnie Hazlehurst, consists of an imaginary lift girl, voiced by Stephanie Gathercole, who also played Mr Rumbold's first secretary, (1944–2011), announcing each floor over the musique concrète sounds of a cash register and a simple musical accompaniment.

The 1977 Are You Being Served? film has a different version of the theme tune which is longer, in a different key and without the floor announcements. A remix of the theme was released in 1996 by a dance act calling itself "Grace Brothers", and featured vocal samples of John Inman and Frank Thornton.

There is an homage to the theme tune in the Ladytron song "Paco!" from the album 604, and New Zealand band Minuit's "I Hate Guns". A lugubrious version of the theme tune is featured on the album The Ape of Naples by the experimental music group Coil. The theme tune has also been covered by Australian band Regurgitator on their 1999 album ...art. Pop singer Jamelia's song "Window Shopping" (from her 2006 album Walk with Me) begins with a sample of the familiar cash register sound effect as well as Mrs Slocombe's voice inquiring, "Good morning, Mr Grainger; are you free?"

The song was also used in a 2016 Audi advertisement for its Quattro range. In the same year, Goldie Lookin Chain used the tune extensively for their song "Waitrose Rap".

== Cast ==
Cast of Are You Being Served?

Original cast of 1972–75. (From left): Mollie Sugden, Wendy Richard, Trevor Bannister, Nicholas Smith, Larry Martyn, Arthur Brough, John Inman, and Frank Thornton.

Series 8 cast of 1981. (left to right): (top) Arthur English, Wendy Richard, Benny Lee, Mike Berry; (bottom) Nicholas Smith, Frank Thornton, Mollie Sugden, Vivienne Johnson, John Inman, Kenneth Waller, Louise Burton

=== Main cast ===
- John Inman as Mr Wilberforce Claybourne Humphries: a camp-acting sales assistant (later senior) in the gentleman's department. The character is implied as having a sexually fluid lifestyle, frequently telling colourful stories and using double entendres that leave his orientation in doubt.
- Mollie Sugden as Mrs Betty Slocombe: a senior sales assistant and head of the ladies' department, portrayed with a different hair colour in each episode. She is vain and snobbish, and speaks with an affected Received Pronunciation accent, which reverts to a broad, working class Northern accent when annoyed or angry. She frequently tells stories about her pet cat, referring to it as "my pussy".
- Wendy Richard as Miss Shirley Brahms: a young, attractive Cockney junior sales assistant under Mrs Slocombe, who sometimes refers to her as "dead common" regarding her working-class background.
- Frank Thornton as Captain Stephen Peacock: a haughty floorwalker who purportedly fought in the North Africa Campaign of World War II, although in one episode a wartime acquaintance reveals him to have been a NAAFI corporal. Croft designed the character to both command and crave respect. He is the nominal floor manager.
- Arthur Brough as Mr Ernest Grainger (series 1–5): a 40-year veteran of Grace Brothers, a senior sales assistant and head of the gents' department. Croft devised the character as being somewhat unlikeable and displaying his age, such as sleeping during opening hours. Brough made his final appearance as Grainger in the 1977 film, dying before the sixth series.
- Trevor Bannister as Mr James/Dick Lucas (series 1–7): a penniless, womanising junior salesman in the gents' department, often cheeky and mocking to the female staff. Bannister appeared until the end of the seventh series, when a job in the theatre conflicted with the show's taping schedule and the BBC refused to reschedule their dates. In an interview after the show's conclusion, Wendy Richard claimed it was originally devised as a platform for Bannister.
- Nicholas Smith as Mr Cuthbert Rumbold, the autocratic, obsequious, bumbling and incompetent manager of both departments. His prominent ears and confused reactions are used to comic effect.
- Harold Bennett as "Young" Mr Grace (series 1–8): the elderly, miserly, and oversexed owner of Grace Bros, often seen with his attractive secretary and/or nurse. Bennett died following the eighth series, prior to the broadcast of the 1981 Christmas special; his character was referenced in the first episode of the spinoff series Grace & Favour.
- Larry Martyn as Mr Mash (series 1–3): a working-class stock and maintenance man at Grace Bros, often hounded from the floor by Captain Peacock. Mash helped demonstrate the specially-designed comic display units that featured in episodes. Martyn left after the 1975 Christmas special; he simultaneously appeared in the series Spring & Autumn, and could no longer manage both schedules.
- Arthur English as Mr Beverley Harman (series 4–10): a working-class stock and maintenance man at Grace Bros, who has more friendly relations with the floor staff than Mr Mash. Harman was created after Mash's departure, and became a staple of the series.
- James Hayter as Mr Percival Tebbs (series 6): a prominent salesman assigned to the men's department in order to replace Mr Grainger. The character lasted only for the sixth series, after which Hayter was paid generously to voice Mr Kipling television adverts.
- Alfie Bass as Mr Harry Goldberg (series 7): a Cockney tailor, brought in to replace Mr Tebbs after retiring. Bass dropped out of the programme following the conclusion of the seventh series.
- Mike Berry as Mr Bert Spooner (series 8–10): a junior sales assistant, with similar traits to Mr Lucas. Berry replaced Bannister following his departure.
- Kenneth Waller as "Old" Mr Henry Grace (series 8): "Young" Mr Grace's even-older brother, who took over the running of Grace Bros while his younger brother took a sabbatical to write his memoirs. Though older than his brother, "Old" Mr. Grace was much more energetic and mobile than "Young" Mr. Grace. Like Dad's Army's Clive Dunn, Waller was much younger than his character's age and the production used makeup to "age up" the actor. Waller replaced Bennett, who left the series after the first episode of Series 8 due to declining health. "Old" Mr. Grace wasn't received well by fans, so he was dropped in favour of bringing back "Young" Mr. Grace as an invisible character.
- Milo Sperber as Mr Grossman (series 8): an expert shoe salesman assigned to the shop floor between men's and ladies'. The character was a replacement for Mr. Goldberg, but Sperber dropped out after four episodes to take a lucrative movie role.
- Benny Lee as Mr Abraham Klein (series 8): a sales assistant assigned to the gents' department to help out with upcoming sales in the store. Like Sperber, Lee lasted only four episodes.
- Candy Davis as Miss Belfridge (series 9–10): the final and longest-lasting of Mr Rumbold's secretaries, an attractive younger woman heavily implied to be having an affair with Captain Peacock.

=== Recurring cast ===
- Freddie Wiles as Goddard (series 1–6): a non-speaking chauffeur to "Young" Mr Grace, who was usually assisting the elderly man in standing up.
- Hilda Fenemore as Elsie (series 2–7): a cleaner at Grace Brothers on friendly terms with the maintenance men, but treated with disdain by the department staff due to her lower social class. The character was also referred to as Ivy and Daphne.
- Moira Foot as Miss Thorpe (series 3): a secretary to Mr Rumbold.
- Doremy Vernon as Mrs Diana Yardswick (series 3–4, 6–10): the canteen manageress at Grace Brothers, famous for serving unappetising food and her distinctively unfriendly service. Her full name is only revealed in later series in separate episodes.
- Penny Irving as Miss Bakewell (series 4–7): the young, naïve secretary to "Young" Mr Grace, who frequently accompanied him around the store and on several implied romantic conquests.
- Diana King and Diana Lambert as Mrs Peacock (series 4, 8–10): the wife of Captain Peacock, who (correctly) suspects that he has extramarital interests.
- Vivienne Johnson as Mr Grace's Nurse (series 6–8): a permanent companion to both "Young" and "Old" Mr Grace, whose competence as a medical professional is outshined by her sex appeal. The character was dropped after both Mr Graces became off-screen presences. Another nurse, uncredited and non-speaking, was played by Pat Ashley in series 4 and 5.
- Louise Burton as Virginia Edwards (series 8): a new secretary hired for "Old" Mr Grace, fulfilling the post previously held by Miss Bakewell.
- Jimmy Mac as Warwick (series 7–9): a maintenance colleague of Mr Harman's who assists with the department's displays.
- Keith Hodiak as Seymour (series 9–10): another maintenance friend of Mr Harman's, more relaxed and cheerful than Warwick, and more involved in the department's activities.

Character appearances series 1–10 and Grace & Favour
Character	Actor	Are You Being Served?											Grace & Favour	
Character	Actor	Series 1	Series 2	Series 3	Series 4	Film	Series 5	Series 6	Series 7	Series 8	Series 9	Series 10	Series 1	Series 2
Cast
Mrs Slocombe	Mollie Sugden	Main	Main	Main	Main	Main	Main	Main	Main	Main	Main	Main	Main	Main
Captain Peacock	Frank Thornton	Main	Main	Main	Main	Main	Main	Main	Main	Main	Main	Main	Main	Main
Mr Humphries	John Inman	Main	Main	Main	Main	Main	Main	Main	Main	Main	Main	Main	Main	Main
Miss Brahms	Wendy Richard	Main	Main	Main	Main	Main	Main	Main	Main	Main	Main	Main	Main	Main
Mr Rumbold	Nicholas Smith	Main	Main	Main	Main	Main	Main	Main	Main	Main	Main	Main	Main	Main
Mr Grainger	Arthur Brough	Main	Main	Main	Main	Main	Main							
Mr Lucas	Trevor Bannister	Main	Main	Main	Main	Main	Main	Main	Main					
Young Mr Grace	Harold Bennett	Recurring	Recurring	Main	Main	Main	Main	Main	Main	Guest				
Mr Mash	Larry Martyn	Recurring	Recurring	Main										
Mr Harman	Arthur English				Main	Main	Main	Main	Main	Main	Main	Main		
Miss Bakewell	Penny Irving				Recurring	Recurring	Recurring	Main	Main					
Mr. Grace's Nurse	Vivienne Johnson							Main	Main	Main				
Mr Tebbs	James Hayter							Main						
Mr Goldberg	Alfie Bass								Main					
Mr Grossman	Milo Sperber									Recurring				
Mr Klein	Benny Lee									Recurring				
Mr Spooner	Mike Berry									Main	Main	Main		
Old Mr Grace	Kenneth Waller									Main				
Miss Belfridge	Candy Davis										Main	Main		

== Episodes ==
Series	Episodes	Originally released	
Series	Episodes	First released	Last released
Pilot		8 September 1972	
1	5	21 March 1973	18 April 1973
2	5	14 March 1974	11 April 1974
3	9	27 February 1975	22 December 1975
4	7	8 April 1976	24 December 1976
5	7	25 February 1977	8 April 1977
Film		31 July 1977	
6	6	15 November 1978	26 December 1978
7	8	19 October 1979	26 December 1979
8	8	9 April 1981	24 December 1981
9	6	22 April 1983	27 May 1983
10	7	18 February 1985	1 April 1985
Special		28 August 2016	

Are You Being Served? was initially broadcast from 1973 to 1985. Each series had between five and nine episodes. Counting the pilot episode, all episodes and specials from the series, and the film, the show ran for sixty-nine episodes and ten series. Each episode was self-contained, with no continuing story or theme throughout the series.

=== Film ===
In 1977, as for many other British sitcoms of the time, a feature film was released. The film version of Are You Being Served? followed the staff of Grace Brothers taking a package holiday together while the store is closed for redecoration, a loose adaptation of the play version from the year before. Set in the fictional resort of Costa Plonka, in Spain, the entire cast of the television series reprised their roles in the film. Reviews of the film were generally mixed, with the Monthly Film Bulletin reviewer John Pym declaring, "The humour consists mainly of withering selection of patent British puns; an inflatable brassiere, some let's-insult-the-Germans jokes and a rickety thunder-box which bolts from the outside are thrown in for good measure."

=== The Best of Are You Being Served? (1992) ===
Buoyed by the huge success of the series in the United States, BBC America commissioned a special straight-to-VHS compilation in 1992. Running at 78 minutes, The Best of Are You Being Served featured newly shot scenes of Mr Humphries reminiscing with his elderly mother, Annie, about his time working at Grace Brothers. Both roles were played by John Inman. The additional sequences were filmed in America, when John Inman was in Phoenix, AZ to promote the show on the local PBS channel, and directed by Don Hopfer.

=== 2016 revival ===
In 2016, a one-off revival episode was announced and filmed at dock10 studios. It was broadcast as part of BBC's Landmark Sitcom Season, a celebration of 60 years of television sitcoms. It was set in 1988 with the original characters, played by a new cast.

Actors John Challis portrayed Captain Peacock and Sherrie Hewson and Roy Barraclough were cast as Mrs Slocombe and Mr Grainger respectively, with comedian Arthur Smith as Mr Harman. Mr Humphries was portrayed by Jason Watkins, Miss Brahms by Niky Wardley, and Mr Rumbold by Justin Edwards. New characters introduced in the show included Young Mr Grace's grandson, also called Young Mr Grace, played by Mathew Horne; Miss Croft, named as a tribute to series co-creator David Croft, played by Jorgie Porter; and newcomer Mr Conway, played by Kayode Ewumi. The episode was written by Derren Litten. The BBC issued a press release saying: "It's 1988 and Young Mr Grace is determined to drag Grace Brothers into, well 1988, but he has a problem on his hands. Mr Humphries, Captain Peacock, Mr Rumbold and Mrs Slocombe all seem to be stuck in another era. A new member of staff, Mr Conway, joins the team but will he help shake things up or will he just put a pussy amongst the pigeons?"

The episode was aired in August 2016 to universally poor reviews for both the writing and the acting. No further episodes were commissioned.

== Other adaptations ==
=== Spin-off ===
Almost immediately after the cancellation of Are You Being Served? in 1985, the cast began suggesting a spin-off to Jeremy Lloyd and David Croft. Though all felt the department store format was exhausted, it was suggested the characters could be moved to a new location. In 1992, most of the original cast reunited for Grace & Favour (known as Are You Being Served? Again! in the United States and Canada). The new series followed the characters after Young Mr Grace's death, when they are forced to run a hotel in a dilapidated manor house that was purchased using their pension fund. Grace & Favour ran for two series.

=== Play ===
In the summer of 1976, a stage adaptation of Are You Being Served? ran at the Winter Gardens, Blackpool. Directed by Robert Redfarn, John Inman, Mollie Sugden, Frank Thornton, Wendy Richard, and Nicholas Smith reprised their characters from the television show while the characters of Mr Lucas, Mr Grainger, and Mr Mash were recast. The play had basically the same plot as the film version which would debut the next year, though Young Mr Grace's role was omitted entirely and Mr Mash had less to do than Mr Harman in the film. Reviews for the play were mixed; a writer for the Blackpool Diarist of the Stage declared it the funniest show he had seen in thirty years, while Michael Leapman from The Times declared the play to be worthless except for the final line, though he admitted he had never seen the television show. The play has occasionally been run at other theatres since.

=== American adaptation ===
In 1979, Garry Marshall, in the midst of success producing and directing Happy Days and its spin-offs, produced a pilot for an American version of Are You Being Served?, Beane's of Boston, remaking the episode, "German Week" for the television pilot.

At the time, Americanised versions of British series, including Three's Company, All in the Family, and Sanford and Son were doing well in the ratings, and Marshall hoped to capitalise on this with his script for the production.

Most of the characters were substantially similar to those of the UK version, with slight name changes in some instances. The one significant difference was that the Rumbold character was replaced by "Franklin Beane" (George O'Hanlon, Jr.), the young nephew of the proprietor who has recently been put in charge of the department.

Jeremy Lloyd's Laugh-In partner, Alan Sues, was cast as Mr Humphries, a decision Lloyd regretted, saying Sues had been miscast.

Other cast included future Magnum, P.I. star John Hillerman as Mr Peacock, Charlotte Rae as Mrs Slocombe, Lorna Patterson as Miss Brahms, Tom Poston as Mr. Beane (the Mr. Grace equivalent), Larry Bishop as Mr. Lucas, Morgan Farley as Mr. Grainger, and Don Bexley as Mr. Johnson (the Mash/Harman role).

Ultimately, CBS passed on Beane's of Boston and a full series was not produced.

=== Australian adaptation ===
An Australian adaptation, also called Are You Being Served?, ran for two series and sixteen episodes from 1980 to 1981 on Network Ten. It starred John Inman as Mr Humphries, who travels to Australia on loan from Grace Brothers to work for the Grace brothers' cousin, Mr Bone at his department store, Bone Brothers (the name Grace Brothers being the name of an actual department store chain founded in Sydney in 1885). Renamed versions of characters from the original series rounded out the cast including June Bronhill as Mrs Crawford, a copy of Mrs Slocombe, and Reg Gillam as Captain Wagstaff, a copy of Captain Peacock. Jeremy Lloyd adapted episodes for the show from his own scripts from the British Are You Being Served, drawing from the then-new episodes of the seventh series for series one of the Australian version, and a selection of older episodes for series two. Lloyd would later say he hated the process of adapting the episodes, which were mostly left intact with the exception of some topical jokes, which were changed or deleted.

=== Dutch specials ===
The TROS, the Dutch broadcaster that showed AYBS? in the Netherlands, invited over the key faces of the original cast twice to reprise their characters on Dutch television (albeit not for a full, half-hour episode). First in 1976, Dutch comedian André van Duin entered a shop and ran into Mr Humphries, Miss Brahms and Mrs Slocombe. A different special was made in 1994, on the occasion of the 30 years jubilee of the TROS. This time, the search was for a replacement for Mrs Slocombe, with Mollie Sugden, John Inman, Frank Thornton, Wendy Richard, and Trevor Bannister all reprising their roles. In 1985 John Inman also assisted in character as co-presenter for a quiz.

== Reception ==
The series gained much of its popularity with TV viewers by "pushing the envelope" through its deliberate-yet-subtle use of risqué visual gags, innuendo-infused dialogue and cleverly disguised sophomoric humour. These comical devices also attracted some mild criticism, in part for relying on sexual stereotypes and double entendres – e.g., Mrs Slocombe discussing her cat (always referred to as her pussy): "Animals are very psychic; the least sign of danger and my pussy's hair stands on end."

John Inman's portrayal of Humphries' over-the-top antics and sharp-tongued, witty responses, along with his trademark catch-phrase "I'm free!", were enthusiastically embraced by many audience members. The character has since evolved into a gay icon in popular culture. Despite this, Inman pointed out that Mr Humphries' sexual orientation was never explicitly stated in the series, and David Croft said in an interview that the character was not homosexual, but "just a mother's boy". In an episode of the spin-off Grace & Favour, the character is further described as neither a "woman's man" nor a "man's man" and as being "in limbo".

In 2000, three new planets were named after cast members Wendy Richard, John Inman and Mollie Sugden in recognition of their roles on the show.

=== International broadcasts ===
The series was shown in the United States on PBS stations and on BBC America, as well as in many Commonwealth nations around the world. PBS first began airing it (on 24 stations) in 1987, and viewership steadily climbed as more stations carried it. By the early 1990s, it had gained such a loyal following that American viewers of the show formed fan clubs and were in large attendance wherever cast members made guest appearances.

Are You Being Served? aired in Canada in prime time on Global Television Network in the mid-1980s and late night on YTV. The show aired on Saturday evening prime time from the mid-1980s to late 1990s. It was also available to Canadian viewers from most border PBS stations in the United States.

The series was successfully screened in Australia. It began on ABC Television in 1974 and was repeated by ABC in Australia several times. By 1978, the rights to early episodes had been acquired by the commercial Seven Network who gained a larger audience than it had received on the ABC. Are You Being Served? was ranked as the top-rated show on Australian television for 1978, being watched by 2,255,000 people in five cities. New episodes were aired on ABC until 1984. After that, the last series was broadcast on the Seven Network.

The entire series was screened in New Zealand on TVNZ.

== Merchandise ==
Seven early episodes were novelised for a book, written by Jeremy Lloyd, called Are You Being Served? – Camping in and other Fiascos. This was written in 1976, and republished in 1997 by KQED Books. The seven episodes featured are "Camping In", "Up Captain Peacock", "Wedding Bells", "His and Hers", "Coffee Morning", "The Hand of Fate" and "The Clock".

In 1995, KQED Books published Are You Being Served – The Inside Story by Adrian Rigelsford, Anthony Brown, and Geoff Tibbals, with a foreword by Jeremy Lloyd, and sub-titled: The Inside Story of Britain's Funniest – and Public Television's Favorite – Comedy Series. In 212 pages, the book's six chapters cover: The Cast of Characters, Behind the Scenes, The Episodes, The Spin-offs, Trivia Quiz, and Glossary.

In 1998, Are You Being Served? 25 Years, a guide to the series was published by Orion Media. It was written by Richard Webber with David Croft and Jeremy Lloyd. The book contains an introduction by the actress Joanna Lumley. The book is 176 pages.

In 1999, I'm Free! The Complete Are You Being Served?, a guide to the series, was published by Orion Books. It was written by Richard Webber, with contributions from David Croft and Jeremy Lloyd. This book as stated on Amazon is 176 pages. It also contains the introduction by Joanna Lumley, so it is probably a reprint of the 25th anniversary book.

A board game was also produced in the 1970s. Players moved round a board resembling the shop floor to purchase one item from each of the four counters and leave the store, before their opponents and without going over budget.

=== DVD releases ===
All episodes exist in the BBC Archives. All ten series, as well as both series of Grace & Favour are now available on DVD in the UK (Region 2). The Are You Being Served? film was released in 2002. A colour-restored version of the original pilot episode has yet to be released commercially but is available in the US to stream on BritBox.

All ten series, as well as both series of Grace & Favour (in packaging titled Are You Being Served? Again!) and the film are available on DVD in Region 1 (North America).

All ten series, as well as both series of Grace & Favour and the film have been released in Australia (Region 4).

A DVD titled Are You Being Served? – Best of The Early Years and Are You Being Served? Christmas Specials have also been released.

DVD title	Discs	Year	Ep. #	DVD release			Special episodes
DVD title	Discs	Year	Ep. #	Region 1	Region 2	Region 4	Special episodes
Complete Series 1	1	1972–1973	6	27 August 2002	25 July 2005	2 March 2006	The Pilot B&W version
Complete Series 2	1	1974	5	27 August 2002	19 September 2005	8 June 2006	—
Complete Series 3	2	1975	9	27 August 2002	30 January 2006	5 October 2006	1975 Christmas Special
Complete Series 4	1	1976	7	27 August 2002	27 March 2006	7 March 2007	1976 Christmas Special
Complete Series 5	1	1977	7	27 August 2002	5 June 2006	6 June 2007	—
Complete Series 6	1	1978	6	30 September 2003	28 August 2006	3 October 2007	1978 Christmas Special
Complete Series 7	1	1979	8	30 September 2003	25 August 2008	6 March 2008	1979 Christmas Special
Complete Series 8	1	1981	8	30 September 2003	7 September 2009	7 August 2008	1981 Christmas Special
Complete Series 9	1	1983	6	30 September 2003	24 May 2010	2 October 2008	—
Complete Series 10	1	1985	7	30 September 2003	13 September 2010	5 March 2009	—
Complete Series 1–5	6	1972–1977	34	27 August 2002	2 October 2006	N/A	Same as individual releases
Complete Series 6–10	5	1978–1985	35	30 September 2003	N/A	N/A	Same as individual releases
Complete Series 1–10	11	1972–1985	69	7 September 2003; 11 August 2009	13 September 2010	1 April 2010	Extra Disc with Profile Specials on Mollie Sugden, Wendy Richard etc. The 2009 R1 reissue comes in the smaller 2 disc thinpak cases instead of standard Amaray keep cases.

== See also ==
- British sitcom
- List of films based on British sitcoms
