= Life with Cooper =

British TV comedy series (1966–1969)

- Genre: Comedy
- Starring: Tommy Cooper
- Country of origin: United Kingdom
- Original language: English
- No. of series: 3
- No. of episodes: 19

Production
- Producers: Milo Lewis; Mark Stuart
- Production companies: ABC Weekend Television (1966–1968); Thames Television (1968–1969)

Original release
- Network: ITV
- Release: 31 December 1966 – 20 May 1969

Life with Cooper is a British comedy television show which was originally broadcast on ITV from 1966 to 1969. A sketch show vehicle for the prop comedian and magician Tommy Cooper, it ran for three series.

Other performers who appeared one or more episodes during the show's run included Warren Mitchell, Robert Dorning, Claire Davenport, Arthur Mullard, Totti Truman Taylor, Frank Williams, Bob Todd, John Clive, Sheila Hancock, John Junkin, Deryck Guyler, Ronald Adam, Cardew Robinson, Dandy Nichols, Willoughby Goddard, Patricia Hayes, Kenneth Cope, Garry Marsh, Dawn Addams, Anna Karen and Glyn Houston.

== Bibliography ==
- Carroll, Ian. Cooperman!: The Life of Tommy Cooper. Fonthill Media, 2018.
- Vahimagi, Tise . British Television: An Illustrated Guide. Oxford University Press, 1996.
