= The Alf Garnett Saga =

1972 British comedy film by Bob Kellett

- Directed by: Bob Kellett
- Written by: Johnny Speight
- Produced by: Terry Glinwood; Ned Sherrin
- Starring: Warren Mitchell; Dandy Nichols; Adrienne Posta
- Cinematography: Nicholas D. Knowland
- Edited by: Al Gell
- Music by: Georgie Fame; Colin Green
- Production companies: Associated London Films; Virgin Films
- Distributed by: Columbia-Warner Distributors
- Release date: 3 August 1972
- Running time: 90 minutes
- Country: United Kingdom
- Language: English

The Alf Garnett Saga is a 1972 British comedy film directed by Bob Kellett and starring Warren Mitchell, Dandy Nichols, Paul Angelis and Adrienne Posta. The film was the second spin-off from the BBC TV series Till Death Us Do Part (1965–1975). It starts where the first film finished, but with Angelis and Posta now playing Mike and Rita, the roles previously played by Anthony Booth and Una Stubbs.

Producer Ned Sherrin said the film "was memorable for a close-up chance to observe the detail which Warren Mitchell and Dandy Nichols put into their characterisations, for a gallery of cameos, and for two curious guest appearances by the football stars Bobby Moore and George Best."

== Plot ==
With the Garnetts' Wapping home demolished, Alf and his family are installed in a high-rise council flat. Alf struggles with "living in the sky", using lifts (which frequently break down due to power cuts "caused by the striking miners") and walking long distances to the local pub. Alf also swallows LSD thinking it is a sugar cube and walks across his neighbours' balcony handrail

== Cast ==
- Warren Mitchell as Alf Garnett
- Dandy Nichols as Else Garnett
- Paul Angelis as Mike Rawlins
- Adrienne Posta as Rita Rawlins
- John Le Mesurier as Mr Frewin
- John Bird as Willis
- Roy Hudd as milkman
- Roy Kinnear as Wally
- Joan Sims as Gran
- Arthur Askey as himself
- George Best as himself
- Max Bygraves as himself
- Julie Ege as herself
- Bobby Moore as himself
- Eric Sykes as himself
- Kenny Lynch as himself
- Patsy Byrne as Mrs Frewin
- Ellis Dale as Clerk
- Derek Griffiths as Rex
- Cleo Sylvestre as conductress
- Tom Chadbon as Jim
- Margaret Heald as 1st bird
- Patricia Quinn as 2nd bird
- Ken Wynne as non-smoker
- Ahmed Khalil as Pakistani
- Mary Pratt as receptionist
- Will Stampe as publican
- Jumoke Debayo as coloured mother
- Elroy Josephs as coloured father
- Arnold Diamond as policeman
- Maurice Bush as docker
- Jackie Donachie as girl
- Richard Speight as boy
- Johnny Speight as Barmy Harry

== Producer ==
The film was made by Ned Sherrin at Virgin Films.

== Reception ==
The Monthly Film Bulletin wrote: "Sadly, The Alf Garnet Saga, which follows directly on from Till Death Us Do Part [1968], is an equally unsuccessful attempt to translate to the cinema what is on the small screen a marvellous, larger-than-life comic creation. Inevitably, other characters ... tend to pale beside that of Alf, as he bulldozes his way through a series of static set-pieces, giving vent to his opinions about the council, strikes, the IRA, 'coons', and so on. Varied locations, however, don't prevent the film from seeming one long repetitive and unfunny diatribe, occasionally broken up by some irrelevant scenes apparently tacked on as an afterthought. ... Johnny Speight's script only occasionally rises above the crudity of its protagonist, as when Alf, with the twisted logic of the true bigot, admits that smoking is dangerous but justifies it by saying he's smoking for Queen and Country, since the tobacco tax supports the National Health Service."

Leslie Halliwell said: "Second inflation of the TV series Till Death Us Do Part, even cruder and less funny than the first; listlessly written and developed."
