= For Richer For Poorer =

For Richer For Poorer may refer to:

- "For Richer For Poorer" (The Green Green Grass), an episode of the BBC sitcom, The Green Green Grass
- For Richer...For Poorer, a 1975 BBC television pilot
- For Richer, for Poorer (film), a 1992 made-for-TV comedy film
- Lovers and Friends, an American soap opera, renamed For Richer, For Poorer

== See also ==
- For Richer or Poorer, a 1997 American comedy film
