= For Richer...For Poorer =

- Created by: Johnny Speight
- Starring: Harry H. Corbett
- Country of origin: United Kingdom
- Original language: English

Original release
- Network: BBC1
- Release: 25 June 1975

For Richer...For Poorer is a 1975 BBC television pilot starring Harry H. Corbett as Bert, a union shop steward who worships Stalin and has dreams of becoming a major politician.

Part of a Comedy Playhouse season, this one-off was broadcast on BBC1, on Wednesday 25 June 1975.

The show had many overlaps with Till Death Us Do Part. It had the same writer (Johnny Speight) and producer (Dennis Main Wilson). Both shows took their titles from the traditional wedding vows, and Bert was seen as the left-wing equivalent of Alf Garnett.

The show is missing from the television archives.

== See also ==
- Maude, an American series that parallels this one
