= Till Death Us Do Part (film) =

1968 British comedy film by Norman Cohen

- Film Poster
- Directed by: Norman Cohen
- Written by: Johnny Speight
- Produced by: Jon Penington
- Starring: Warren Mitchell; Dandy Nichols; Tony Booth; Una Stubbs
- Cinematography: Harry Waxman
- Edited by: Anthony Lenny
- Music by: Wilfred Burns
- Production company: Associated London Films
- Distributed by: British Lion Film Corporation
- Release dates: 12 December 1968 (World premiere); 10 January 1969 (United Kingdom)
- Running time: 100 minutes
- Country: United Kingdom
- Language: English
- Budget: £300,000
- Box office: £1 million

Till Death Us Do Part (also known as Alf'n' Family) is a 1968 British comedy film directed by Norman Cohen, written by Johnny Speight, and starring Warren Mitchell and Dandy Nichols. It was based on the BBC television series of the same name created by Speight. A sequel, The Alf Garnett Saga, followed in 1972.

The success of the film inspired a series of feature films based on British sitcoms.

== Plot ==
The film begins in September 1939 shortly before World War II begins. Alf Garnett, a dockyard worker, and his wife Else have been married for only a few weeks, and are already weary of one another. Alf gets called up for military duty but is turned down because he is in a reserved occupation. The film depicts their lives during the London Blitz. Else eventually gets pregnant to Alf and Else's shock, and they have a baby daughter, Rita, in 1942. The war ends in 1945 with a huge street party and Alf, characteristically, gets drunk.

Midway through the film it advances from the end of World War II to the 1966 General Election. Rita is now a young woman and engaged to Mike Rawlins, a long-haired layabout from Liverpool. Alf dislikes him because of his support for the Labour Party. Mike and Rita marry in a Catholic church, further angering Alf. At the wedding supper he fights with Mike's family. But Alf and Mike grow a bit closer, attending the 1966 FIFA World Cup final together.

The film ends in 1968 with the family moving to a new tower block in Essex after their East End neighbourhood street is demolished.

== Cast ==
- Warren Mitchell as Alf Garnett
- Dandy Nichols as Else Garnett
- Una Stubbs as Rita Rawlins
- Antony Booth as Mike Rawlins
- Liam Redmond as Mr. Rawlins
- Bill Maynard as Bert
- Brian Blessed as sergeant
- Sam Kydd as Fred
- Frank Thornton as valuation officer
- Ann Lancaster as woman at the flats
- Michael Robbins as pub landlord
- Pat Coombs as neighbour
- Kate Williams as sergeant's girlfriend
- Shelagh Fraser as Mrs. Rawlins
- John D. Collins as RAF officer at Tube station
- Geoffrey Hughes as Mike's brother
- Tommy Godfrey as knowledgeable man in pub
- Bob Grant as man in pub
- Edward Evans as Jim (shopkeeper)

== Production ==
Don Sharp was originally meant to direct but during production had disagreements with Johnny Speight over the script which led to Sharp being fired.

The film had investment from the Robert Stigwood Organisation. It went over budget but recovered its cost with a successful theatre run.

Location footage was filmed in Tower Hamlets.

The theme tune was composed by Ray Davies of the Kinks. Sung by Chas Mills, it is heard briefly at the end of the film over the closing credits.

The film operates in a separate continuity to that of the TV series, most notably the Garnetts moving out of Wapping which did not occur in the series or its continuation.

== Reception ==
=== Critical ===
The Monthly Film Bulletin wrote: "The familiar story of a successful half-hour television series expanded for the big screen and losing itself in the process. On television Johnny Speight's outrageous bigot was allowed to work out his prejudices one by one; the formula was relaxed, ideal for the cumulative effect essential to a television comedy series. Transferred to a feature-length film, the Garnett persona is diminished rather than extended, and the acerbity of the original is almost inevitably sugared over. The script attempts to steer round this difficulty by taking us back to the war, and the recreation of wartime Wapping ... is accurate and ingenious, if a little too insistently nostalgic. But the film itself is formless and uneven, and Alf's essential crudity is matched by Norman Cohen's characterless direction, which too often falls back on playing to the gallery (repeated lavatory jokes, Alf rising to attention from his bath in naked homage to the National Anthem or stealing milk from his baby's bottle). The second half of the film is no more than a string of disconnected sketches, some of them, like the football match, purloined from the television series; Alf's prejudices are reduced to a few badly timed jibes at all and sundry. ... Above all, the didactic purpose of the original is completely gone: watching the film at a public showing one noticed that the audience consistently laughed with Alf rather than at him."

Time Out wrote, "In its favour, it preserves the original characterisations at something like full strength and doesn't attempt to stitch three weekly episodes together and pass it off as a feature."

Leslie Halliwell said: "Unremarkable and frequently misguided opening-up of a phonomenally successful TV series ... The original cast wades cheerfully enough through a bitty script."

=== Box office ===
Till Death Us Do Part was the third-most popular film at the UK box office in 1969.
