= Curry and Chips =

1969 British TV sitcom

- Written by: Johnny Speight
- Directed by: Keith Beckett
- Starring: Spike Milligan; Eric Sykes; Norman Rossington; Kenny Lynch
- Country of origin: United Kingdom
- Original language: English
- No. of series: 1
- No. of episodes: 6

Production
- Running time: 30 minutes
- Production company: London Weekend

Original release
- Network: ITV
- Release: 21 November – 26 December 1969

Curry and Chips is a British television sitcom broadcast in 1969 which was produced by London Weekend Television for the ITV network.

Set on a factory floor of 'Lillicrap Ltd', it starred a browned up Spike Milligan as an Irishman of Pakistani heritage named Kevin O'Grady, who also featured in episode 7 of the fifth series of Speight's Till Death Us Do Part. It also featured Eric Sykes as the foreman, Norman Rossington as the shop steward; other regulars were Kenny Lynch, and Sam Kydd. The series was written by Till Death Us Do Part writer Johnny Speight, but based on an idea by Milligan. The programme attracted controversy for its high amount of profanity and its racist humour, and was cancelled as a result.

It was the first LWT sitcom to be broadcast in its entirety in colour, and all episodes still exist.

== Background ==
The ambition of Curry and Chips was purportedly to highlight discrimination, rather than promote it. The Independent Television Authority disagreed, and Curry and Chips was cancelled by them after only six episodes. Speight himself later remarked, "It was the English who were made to look bigoted in the show but the people at the ITA couldn't understand that. It was London Weekend Television's first year, but only six shows went out. The ITA made LWT take it off, saying it was racist." They were not alone, as amongst those who originally complained about the show were the Race Relations Board.

Screenonline says of the show, "though it again attempted to raise important questions, [it] lacked a strong enough voice to challenge the racist attitudes of its characters, and too much of its humour relied on the use of crude racial abuse and Milligan's caricatured performance as the charmlessly-nicknamed 'Paki Paddy'. The shocked reaction from some viewers and cultural commentators led to the show being dropped by ITV after just six episodes, and in retrospect it is hard to understand how Speight and LWT can have failed to anticipate the offence it caused."

The show was also controversial for the number of swear words in it. The word 'bloody' was used 59 times in one episode, although Eric Sykes refused to swear until doing so, once, in the final episode.

Six years later, Milligan once again blacked up in the BBC series The Melting Pot. Only one episode was shown, and the other five were pulled.

== Episodes ==
No.	Title	Directed by	Written by	Original release date
1	"Episode 1"	Keith Beckett	Johnny Speight	21 November 1969
2	"Episode 2"	Keith Beckett	Johnny Speight	28 November 1969
3	"Episode 3"	Keith Beckett	Johnny Speight	5 December 1969
4	"Episode 4"	Keith Beckett	Johnny Speight	12 December 1969
5	"Episode 5"	Keith Beckett	Johnny Speight	19 December 1969
6	"Episode 6"	Keith Beckett	Johnny Speight	26 December 1969

== DVD release ==
Curry and Chips – The Complete Series was released on 19 April 2010 by Network. Catalogue Number 7953165.
