= Warren Mitchell =

English actor (1926–2015)

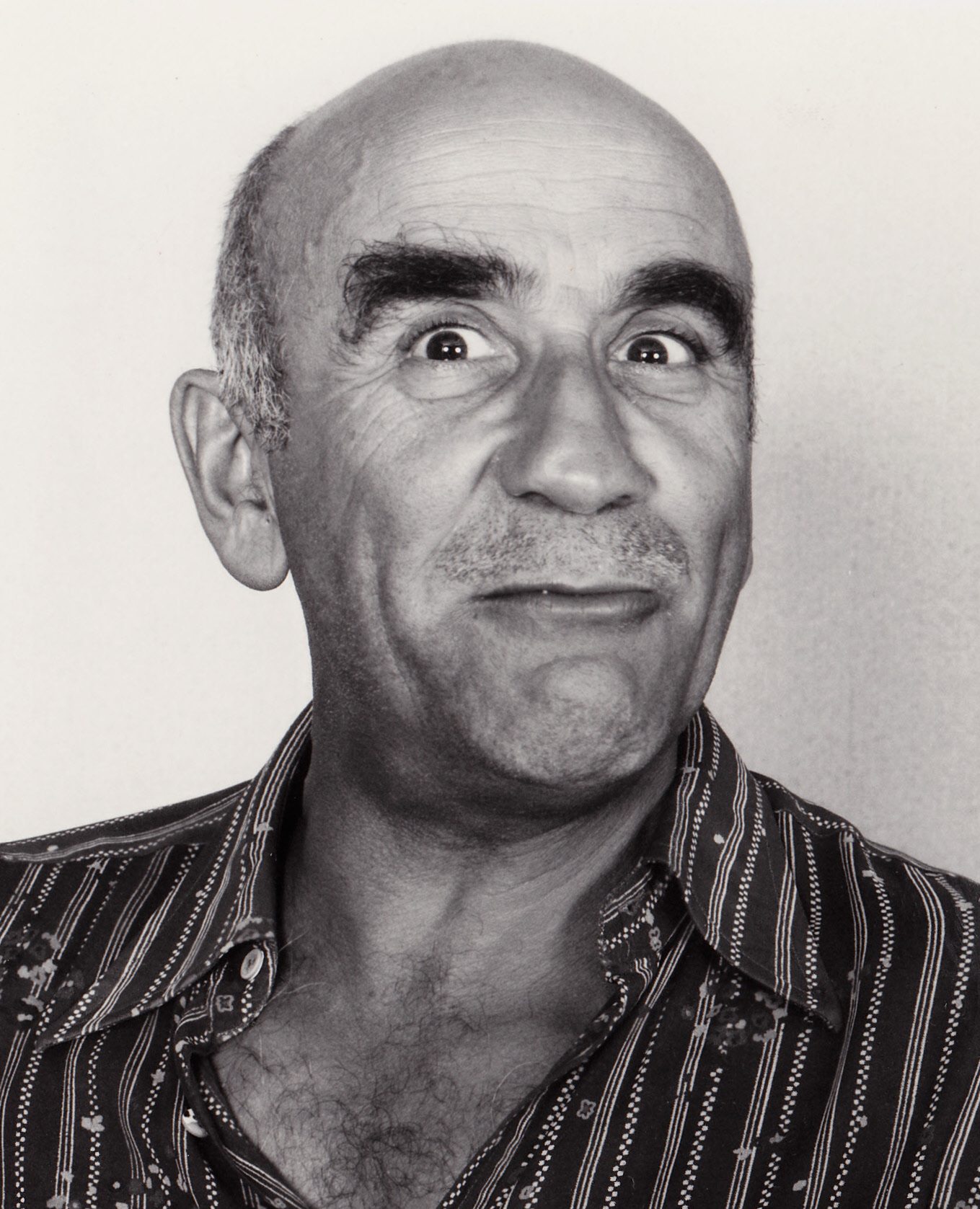
- Mitchell in 1978
- Born: Warren Misell; 14 January 1926; Stoke Newington, London, England
- Died: 14 November 2015 (aged 89); Hampstead, London, England
- Education: University College, Oxford; Royal Academy of Dramatic Art
- Occupation: Actor
- Years active: 1951–2015
- Notable work: See below
- Spouse: Constance Wake (m. 1951)
- Children: 3

Warren Mitchell (born Warren Misell; 14 January 1926 – 14 November 2015) was an English actor best known for playing bigoted cockney Alf Garnett in television, film and stage productions from the 1960s to the 1990s. He was a BAFTA TV Award winner and twice a Laurence Olivier Award winner.

In the 1950s, Mitchell appeared on the radio programmes Educating Archie and Hancock's Half Hour. He also performed minor roles in several films. In the 1960s, he rose to prominence in the role of Alf Garnett in the BBC television sitcom Till Death Us Do Part (1965–75), created by Johnny Speight, which won him a Best TV Actor BAFTA in 1967. He reprised the role in the television sequels Till Death... (ATV, 1981) and In Sickness and in Health (BBC, 1985–92), and in the films Till Death Us Do Part (1969) and The Alf Garnett Saga (1972).

Mitchell's other film appearances include Three Crooked Men (1958), Carry On Cleo (1964), The Spy Who Came In from the Cold (1965), The Assassination Bureau (1969) and Norman Loves Rose (1982). He held both British and Australian citizenship and enjoyed considerable success in stage performances in both countries, winning Olivier Awards in 1979 for Death of a Salesman and in 2004 for The Price.

== Early life ==
Mitchell was born and raised in Stoke Newington, London. His father was a glass and china merchant. His family were Russian Jews (originally called "Misell").

Mitchell was interested in acting from an early age and attended Gladys Gordon's Academy of Dramatic Arts in Walthamstow from the age of seven. He did well at Southgate County School (which became Minchenden School), a state grammar school at Palmers Green, North London. He then studied physical chemistry at University College, Oxford, as a Royal Air Force cadet student on a six-month university short course which the armed services sponsored for potential officers. There he met his contemporary, Richard Burton, and together they joined the RAF in October 1944. He completed his navigator training in Canada just as the Second World War ended.

== Career ==
Richard Burton's description of the acting profession had convinced him that it would be better than completing his chemistry degree, and so Mitchell attended RADA for two years, performing in the evening with London's Unity Theatre. After a short stint as a DJ on Radio Luxembourg, in 1951, Mitchell became a versatile professional actor with straight and comedy roles on stage, radio, film and television. His first broadcast was as a regular on the radio show Educating Archie, and this led to appearances in both the radio and television versions of Hancock's Half Hour.

By the late 1950s, Mitchell regularly appeared on television. These roles included Sean Connery's trainer in boxing drama Requiem for a Heavyweight (1957), with Charlie Drake in the sitcom Drake's Progress (BBC, 1957) and a title role in Three 'Tough' Guys (ITV, 1957), in which he played a bungling criminal. He also appeared in several episodes of Armchair Theatre. During the first of these, Underground (1958), one of the lead actors died during the live performance. He also had roles in The Avengers in addition to many ITC drama series including: William Tell, The Four Just Men, Sir Francis Drake, Danger Man and as a recurrent guest in The Saint, as in the second episode of the first season, "The Latin Touch" in 1962, depicting an Italian taxi driver.

Mitchell's cinema début was in Guy Hamilton's Manuela (1957), and he began a career of minor roles as sinister foreign agents, assisted by his premature baldness and facility with Eastern European accents. He appeared in The Roman Spring of Mrs. Stone (1961), the Hammer horror The Curse of the Werewolf (1961), Carry On Cleo (1964), Where Has Poor Mickey Gone? (Gerry Levy, 1964), and Help! (Richard Lester, 1965) and played leads in All the Way Up (James MacTaggart, 1970), The Chain (Jack Gold, 1984), The Dunera Boys (Ben Lewin, 1985) and Foreign Body (Ronald Neame, 1986).

In 1965, Mitchell was cast in the role for which he became best known, as the Conservative-voting, bigoted cockney West Ham United supporter Alf Garnett in a play for the BBC Comedy Playhouse series, broadcast on 22 July 1965. This was the pilot edition of the long-running series Till Death Us Do Part, with Gretchen Franklin, Una Stubbs and Anthony Booth. The part of Mum, played by Franklin, was recast with Dandy Nichols in the role when the programme was commissioned as a series. Mitchell's real life persona was different from Alf Garnett, being Jewish, Labour-voting and a staunch supporter of Tottenham Hotspur. The show ran from 1966 to 1975, in seven series, making a total of 53 30-minute episodes. While the series aimed to satirise racism, it actually also gained the support of many bigoted racists who perceived Alf as "the voice of reason".

Mitchell reprised the role of Alf Garnett in the films Till Death Us Do Part (1969) and The Alf Garnett Saga (1972), in the ATV series Till Death... (1981), and in the BBC series In Sickness and in Health (1985–92). He also reprised his role as Alf Garnett in 1983 in the television series The Main Attraction where comedians recreated their famous acts from their past in front of a live and television audience (similar to An Audience with... that began in 1976). In 1997 he played the role in An Audience with Alf Garnett. The same year, ITV aired a series of mini-episodes called A Word With Alf, featuring Alf and his friends. All the TV shows and both films were written by Johnny Speight. When Speight died in 1998, the character of Alf Garnett was retired at Mitchell's request.

Mitchell had a long and distinguished career on stage and television. Other small screen roles included a 13-episode series, Men of Affairs with Brian Rix (ITV, 1973–74), based on the West End hit farce Don't Just Lie There, Say Something! There were also performances in 1975 in Play for Today (showing that he could play a serious character role in the episode, Moss), as William Wardle, a crooked accountant in The Sweeney episode Big Spender (Thames Television for ITV, 1978), Lovejoy (BBC), Waking the Dead (BBC), Kavanagh QC (Central Television for ITV, he played a concentration camp survivor in the episode Ancient History), as Shylock in The Merchant of Venice (BBC, 1980) and Gormenghast (BBC, 2000). In 1991 he starred as Ivan Fox, a Jewish atheist from London living in Belfast in So You Think You've Got Troubles, a BBC One comedy series written by Maurice Gran and Laurence Marks.

In 2001, Mitchell appeared in a Christmas Special episode of Last of the Summer Wine, "Potts in Pole Position".

Mitchell was a subject of the television programme This Is Your Life in 1972 when he was surprised by Eamonn Andrews.

On stage, Mitchell received extensive critical acclaim for his performances as Willy Loman in Arthur Miller's Death of a Salesman at the National Theatre directed by Michael Rudman (1979, being originally cast in the role by Stephen Barry at the Playhouse in Perth, Australia); Harold Pinter's The Caretaker at the National Theatre; Pinter's The Homecoming at London's Comedy Theatre (1991), King Lear at the then West Yorkshire Playhouse directed by Jude Kelly in 1995 and Miller's The Price at the Apollo Theatre in 2003.

Mitchell had a number of musical roles in his lengthy career, beginning with the role of Theophile in the original London production of Can-Can and the small role of Crookfinger Jake in The Threepenny Opera. He also sang briefly in the film Till Death Do Us Part and played Alfred Doolittle on the studio album of My Fair Lady, Music Hall Songs, songs of the First World War, and other recordings such as The Writing's on the Wall, from 1967, on CBS, all in the Alf Garnett persona, were released in LP and 45 rpm single form, too, in Britain and Australia.

In 2008, at the age of 82, Mitchell was performing alongside Ross Gardiner at the Trafalgar Studios, in London's West End, as a retired dry-cleaner in Jeff Baron's portrait of Jewish-American life Visiting Mr. Green.

== Awards ==
In 1976, Mitchell's one-man show The Thoughts of Chairman Alf won the Evening Standard Theatre Award for best comedy in London's West End. In 1982, he received an Australian Film Institute Award for best supporting actor in the film Norman Loves Rose. He received two Laurence Olivier Theatre Awards: for playing Willy Loman in Arthur Miller's Death of a Salesman (National Theatre, 1979) and as best supporting actor in a 2003 performance of The Price, also by Miller. His role in Death of a Salesman also won him an Evening Standard Theatre Award for Best Actor and was highly praised by Peter Hall. Miller reportedly described Mitchell's performance as "one of the best interpretations of the part he had ever seen."

| Year | Award | Category | Work | Result | Ref. |
|---|---|---|---|---|---|
| 1967 | BAFTA TV Award | Best Actor | Till Death Us Do Part | Won | |
| 1979 | Olivier Award | Actor of the Year in a Revival | Death of a Salesman | Won | |
| 1979 | Evening Standard Theatre Awards | Evening Standard Theatre Award for Best Actor | Death of a Salesman | Won | |
| 1981 | Olivier Award | Actor of the Year in a Revival | The Caretaker | Nominated | |
| 1982 | AACTA Award (AFI) | Best Supporting Actor | Norman Loves Rose | Won | |
| 1991 | Olivier Award | Actor of the Year | The Homecoming | Nominated | |
| 2004 | Olivier Award | Best Performance in a Supporting Role | The Price | Won | |

== Personal life and death ==
Mitchell described himself in an interview as an atheist, but also stated that he "enjoy[ed] being Jewish". He was a patron of the British Humanist Association. In 1951, he married Constance Wake, an actress who appeared in early 1960s television dramas such as Maigret. They had three children.

For over 20 years, Mitchell suffered pain from nerve damage, caused by transverse myelitis, and was a supporter of the Neuropathy Trust. He suffered a mild stroke in August 2004. He was back on stage a week later, reprising his lauded role as a cantankerous old Jew in Arthur Miller's The Price.

In sharp contrast to his signature Alf Garnett character, who was a staunch Conservative, Mitchell was a socialist and Labour Party supporter. He believed that the 2010 Labour Party leadership election had a lack of firebrands.

Mitchell died aged 89, at the Royal Free Hospital in Hampstead, London, on 14 November 2015, following a long illness.

== Selected filmography ==
=== Films ===
- Five Days (1954) as Laughing Man in Bar (uncredited)
- The Passing Stranger (1954) (uncredited)

The Trollenberg Terror (1956) as Professor Crevett

- Manuela (1957) as Moss
- Barnacle Bill (1957) as Artie White
- Girls at Sea (1958) as Arthur
- The Trollenberg Terror (1958) as Prof. Crevett
- Three Crooked Men (1959) as Walter Prinn
- The Stranglers of Bombay (1959) as Merchant (uncredited)
- Tommy the Toreador (1959) as Waiter
- Two-Way Stretch (1960) as Tailor
- Hell Is a City (1960) as Commercial Traveller
- Doctor in Love (1960) as Haystack Club Manager (uncredited)
- The Boy Who Stole a Million (1960) as Pedro
- Surprise Package (1960) as Klimatis
- The Pure Hell of St Trinian's (1960) as Tailor
- The Curse of the Werewolf (1961) as Pepe Valiente
- Don't Bother to Knock (1961) as Waiter
- The Roman Spring of Mrs. Stone (1961) as Giorgio
- The Silent Invasion (1962) as Robert
- Postman's Knock (1962) as Rupert
- Operation Snatch (1962) as Contact Man
- Village of Daughters (1962) as Puccelli (A Father)
- The Main Attraction (1962) as Cafe Proprietor (uncredited)
- We Joined the Navy (1962) as 'Honest' Marcel
- The King's Breakfast (1963) as The Gym Instructor (short)
- Edgar Wallace Mysteries episode: Incident at Midnight (1963) as Chemist
- The Small World of Sammy Lee (1963) as Lou Leeman
- Unearthly Stranger (1963) as Prof. Geoffrey D. Munro
- Calculated Risk (1963) as Simmie
- The Sicilians (1964) as O'Leary
- Seventy Deadly Pills (1964) as Lofty
- Carry On Cleo (1964) as Spencius
- Where Has Poor Mickey Gone? (1964) as Emilio Dinelli, the Magician (with Ottilie Patterson)
- The Intelligence Men (1965) as Prozoroff
- The Spy Who Came In from the Cold (1965) as Mr. Zanfrello
- San Ferry Ann (1965) as Maitre d'Hotel
- Help! (1965) as Abdul
- Promise Her Anything (1965) as Frank Focus / Panel Moderator
- Night Caller from Outer Space (1965) as Reg Lilburn
- The Sandwich Man (1966) as Gypsy Sid
- Drop Dead Darling (1966) as Conte de Rienz / Maximillian
- The Jokers (1967) as Lennie
- Dying for a Smoke (1967) as Old Nick O'Teen (voice)
- Diamonds for Breakfast (1968) as Popov
- Till Death Us Do Part (1969) as Alf Garnett
- The Assassination Bureau (1969) as Herr Weiss
- The Best House in London (1969) as Count Pandolfo
- Moon Zero Two (1969) as Hubbard
- All the Way Up (1970) as Fred Midway
- Innocent Bystanders (1972) as Omar
- The Alf Garnett Saga (1972) as Alf Garnett
- What Changed Charley Farthing? (1975) as MacGregor
- Jabberwocky (1977) as Mr. Fishfinger
- Stand Up, Virgin Soldiers (1977) as Morris Morris
- Meetings with Remarkable Men (1979) as Gurdjieff's Father
- Norman Loves Rose (1982) as Morris
- The Plague Dogs (1982) as Tyson / Wag (voice)
- The Chain (1984) as Bamber
- Foreign Body (1986) as I.Q. Patel
- Knights and Emeralds (1986) as Mr. Kirkpatrick
- Kokoda Crescent (1988) as Stan
- Brahms and the Little Singing Girls (1996) as Brahms
- Crackers (1998) as Albert Hall
- The 10th Man (2006) as Coleman (short)

=== Television ===
- The Children of the New Forest (1955) as Oliver Cromwell
- Hancock's Half Hour (1956–1959) as Various characters (5 episodes)
- No Shepherds Watched (1957) as Boxer Baxter (TV Movie)
- The Man Who Was Two (1957) as Vickery (1 episode)
- Requiem for a Heavyweight (1957) as Army
- Nicholas Nickleby (1957) as Gentleman in small clothes (1 episode)
- Big Guns (1958) as Kegworthy (5 episodes)
- Dick and the Duchess (1958) as Charlie Burrows (1 episode)
- Starr and Company (1958) as Charlie Rogers (3 episodes)
- The Larkins (1958) as Maxie Green (1 episode)
- The Vise (1958) as Ben Chou (1 episode, uncredited)
- Underground (1958) as Stan
- William Tell (1959) as Carlo
- Interpol Calling (1959) as Willi (1 episode)
- The Four Just Men (1959) as George Rudley (1 episode)
- No Hiding Place (1960–1962) as Miles Webber, Bembo (2 episodes)
- Knight Errant Limited (1960) as Police Chief (1 episode
- Man from Interpol (1960) as Police Chief (1 episode
- Danger Man (1960–1966) as Various characters (5 episodes)
- Bootsie and Snudge (1961–1963) as Various characters (5 episodes)
- Colonel Trumper's Private War (1961) as Prof. Pan Malcov (5 episodes)
- Deadline Midnight (1961) as Andre Gudenian (1 episode)
- Sir Francis Drake (1961) as Roberto (1 episode)
- Maigret (1961) as Aristide (1 episode)
- Comedy Playhouse: Cliquot et Fils (1961) as Alphonse Lagillarde
- Comedy Playhouse: The Channel Swimmer (1962) as Austin
- Suspense (1962) as Mullen (1 episode)
- Brothers in Law (1962) as George Coles (1 episode)
- Man of the World (1962) as Alex (1 episode)
- Ghost Squad (1962–1963) as Mahmoud, Alfiat (2 episodes)
- The Saint (1962–1963) as Marco Di Cesari (3 episodes)
- Z-Cars (1962) as Morrie Morris (1 episode)
- Crane (1963) as Julius Dorfmann (1 episode)
- The Human Jungle (1963) as Deacon Hobbs (1 episode)
- Mauspassant (1963) as Monsieur Dubois (1 episode)
- Zero One (1963) as Suleman Bey, Captain Awad (2 episodes)
- Harry's Girls (1963) as The Director (1 episode)
- Our Man at St. Mark's (1963) as Joe Meyer (1 episode)
- The Sentimental Agent (1963) as Pugh (1 episode)
- The Avengers (1963–1967) as Various characters (3 episodes)
- Sergeant. Cork (1964) as Kendrick (1 episode)
- Detective (1964) as Roscovitch (1 episode)
- The Graham Stark Show (1964) as Various characters (1 episode)
- The Indian Tales of Rudyard Kipling (1964) as Dina Da (1 episode)
- The Big Noise (1964) as Willy Lyman (1 episode)
- Redcap (1964) as Inspector Grigoriou (1 episode)
- A Little Big Business (1965) as Dr. Froehling (1 episode)
- Comedy Playhouse: Till Death Us Do Part (1965) as Alf Ramsey
- Gaslight Theatre (1965) as Various characters (5 episodes)
- Out of the Unknown: The Fox and the Forest (1965) as Kendrick
- The Wednesday Play: Calf Love (1966) as Herr Westermann
- Court Martial (1966) as Guido Orsini (1 episode)
- Frankie Howerd (1966) as Francis' Agent (1 episode)
- Lee Oswald Assassin (1966) as Spas T. Raikin
- Pardon the Expression (1966) as Harvey Clawson (1 episode)
- The Man in Room 17 (1966) as Petropolous (1 episode)
- Till Death Us Do Part (1966–1975) as Alf Garnett (All 53 episodes)
- Intrigue (1966) as Schumminge (1 episode)
- Life with Cooper (1967) as Various characters (1 episode)
- Misleading Cases (1967) as Professor Lindquist (1 episode)
- Marriage and Henry Sunday (1967) as Henry Sunday
- Comedy Playhouse: Tooth and Claw (1969) as Reuben Tooth
- The Frankie Howerd Show (1969) as Various characters (1 episode)
- Comedy Playhouse: No Peace on the Western Front (1972) as Fritz Van Scharganau Clausewitz
- Black and Blue: Secrets (1973) as Rose
- Men of Affairs (1973–1974) as Sir William Mainwaring-Brown MP (All 15 episodes)
- The Sweeney (1975) as William Wardle (1 episode)
- Play For Today: Moss (1975) as Moss (1 episode)
- Big Deal in New York City (1977) as Albert Cakebread
- The Merchant of Venice (1980) as Shylock
- The Caretaker (1981) as Davies
- Till Death... (1981) as Alf Garnett (All 6 episodes)
- Lady Is a Tramp (1984) as Tramp (1 episode)
- Waterfront (1984) as Laughing Les (Mini Series)
- Men of Letters (1984) as Sir Dorton Serry (TV Movie)
- The Last Bastion (1984) as Franklin D Roosevelt (Mini Series)
- The Dunera Boys (1985) as Mr Baum (Mini Series)
- In Sickness and in Health (1985–1992) as Alf Garnett (All 47 episodes)
- Songs From 'My Fair Lady' (1987) as Alfred P. Doolittle
- Tickets for the Titanic (1988) as George (1 episode)
- Acropolis Now (1989) as Kostas Stephanidis (1 episode)
- Jackaroo (1990) as Ambrose Barberton (1 episode)
- So You Think You've Got Troubles? (1991) as Ivan Fox (4 episodes)
- Lovejoy (1993) as Uncle Jack (1 episode)
- Screen One: Wall of Silence (1993) as Samuel Singer (1 episode)
- Death of a Salesman (1996) as Willy Loman (TV Movie)
- Gobble (1997) as Waterboard Chairman (TV Movie)
- Kavanagh QC (1997) as Avran Rypin (1 episode)
- Ain't Misbehavin' (1997) as Ray Smiles (Mini Series)
- A Word with Alf (1997) as Alf Garnett
- The Thoughts of Chairman Alf (1998) as Alf Garnett (All 6 episodes)
- Gormenghast (2000) as Barquentine (4 episodes)
- Monsignor Renard (2000) as Marshall Petain (1 episode, voice)
- A Christmas Carol (2000) as James Scrooge (Eddie's Dad)
- Last of the Summer Wine (2001) as Potts (1 episode)
- Waking the Dead (2003) as Edgar Truelove (2 episodes)
- The Shark Net (2003) as Ralph Wheatley (2 episodes)
