= Mist: The Tale of a Sheepdog Puppy =

- Directed by: Richard Overall
- Country of origin: United Kingdom
- Original language: English

Original release
- Release: 25 December 2006

Mist: The Tale of a Sheepdog Puppy is a British family television film following the life of a Border Collie puppy as she grows up to become a working Herding dog. Part fiction, part documentary, it was filmed by real-life shepherd David Kennard on his farm in Devon. It features his seven working dogs - the puppy Mist, her gentle mother Gail, grandfather 'Sir' Gregory, eccentric, bubbly, hyper uncle Jake, sour and negative great-auntie Fern, gruff, tough cousin Ernie and wise auntie Swift.

The dogs are voiced by artists including Mel Giedroyc, Brian Blessed, Una Stubbs and Sandra Dickinson, and the film is narrated by Derek Jacobi. It was first broadcast by Five in the United Kingdom on Christmas Day 2006.

== Plot ==
One foggy night in Devon, Gail, a working Border Collie Herding dog, gives birth to a litter of three puppies, in a barn on Borough Farm. As she lies with her newborn litter, her father, Sir Gregory, walks inside, not realizing she had her puppies until she summons his attention and he spots them curled up next to her. She has already named two of them Storm and Drift but she thinks Sir Gregory should name the third. He looks out of the window and names her Mist after the "misty" night she was born. All the other dogs, Swift, her son Ernie, and Jake, are delighted to meet the puppies at last but Fern doesn't seem to like puppies and is not happy to be their aunt.

When the puppies realize they can finally see things, Mist looks out of a nearby window and sees a flock of sheep pass by, but does not exactly know what they are. She points them out to Storm and Drift, but by the time they come to the window, the sheep are gone. They think Mist is making it up, and they playfully tease and wrestle each other around the barn. This soon tires them out, and they slowly fall asleep side by side.

Mist seems to like the idea of working the flock more than her brother and sister. Later that day, Sir Gregory talks with Gail about how well Mist is doing compared to Storm and Drift. Gail realises it is finally time to choose which of the puppies will stay on Borough Farm to be trained as a working sheepdog, and which have to leave. One day the puppies are playing in the yard when two different families come to take Storm and Drift away. They are placed in the cars and Gail sadly watches them drive away.

Winter arrives at Borough Farm, but Fern has still not warmed up to Mist. One day Mist gets giddy and runs off into the woods; a dark place where she soon gets lost and has to be rescued by the Boss and Sir Gregory. This amuses Fern.

Mist wants to be a working sheepdog more quickly and gets bored of her training. So when her first test arrives, she gets over excited and fails. She is given the walk of shame by the Boss, which pleases Fern very much.

Mist begins to doubt she will ever become a working sheepdog and decides she needs more practice and rounds up some ducks that she befriends from a nearby pond, pretending they are sheep. With their help, she slowly manages to control herself and learns what it takes to be a good sheepdog.

Fern does not want everyone to think Mist is better than her, so she tricks Mist into breaking one of the rules and rounding up rams. After a narrow escape from them Mist is harshly told off by her mother and Fern watches with pride. The next day, Mist succeeds in her next test. Sir Gregory is very proud of her and thinks of how far she has come from being a puppy as he goes to sleep, deciding to remember to tell Mist that in the morning but he dies in his sleep.

Everyone misses Sir Gregory but does not let it interfere with their work. Without Sir Gregory though, Mist starts to lose confidence. One misty day, Mist and Fern (still not friends) are sent to save a ram, named MacPhereson, from a cliff. Mist has to go alone since Fern is terrified of heights, but Fern helps Mist go in the right direction with her "amazing" hearing but Mist is attacked and pushed off by MacPhereson. Fern, the Boss and MacPhereson think she didn’t survive and Fern suddenly feels sad and guilty, but it turns out Mist survived, and she moves McPherson off the cliff with the skill Sir Gregory taught her: "The power is in the eyes". Fern is amazed and glad to see Mist safe and sound, and they climb back up the cliff together.

Back on the farm, Fern says she is extremely proud of Mist and concedes that she is a brilliant sheepdog, burying their rivalry at last. As the film ends, we see Mist happily working the flock with her family, having now claimed her place as one of the pack.

== Characters ==
Narrator: Derek Jacobi

The Boss: David Kennard

=== Borough Farm Sheepdogs ===
- Mist is the main character. She is a brave and cheeky sheepdog who is born on a sheep farm on a misty night. She dreams of becoming a great working sheepdog and is voiced by Mel Giedroyc.
- Sir Gregory is the oldest and wisest dog on the farm, and is Mist's grandfather. He teaches her how to be a sheepdog, and is voiced by Brian Blessed.
- Fern is Mist's auntie (though she does not like to be called so) and does not get on with the new arrival to Borough Farm. She likes to give Mist a hard time as she grows up, has very good hearing due to her pointy ears, and is voiced by Una Stubbs.
- Gail is Mist's mum who looks after her as she grows up. She is very close to her father, Sir Gregory, and guides Mist well with her caring nature as Mist learns how to become a sheepdog. Voiced by Sandra Dickinson.
- Jake is Mist's uncle, who is the joker of the Borough Farm dogs. He is highly intelligent but is easily distracted. He is obsessed with mud, sticks and rolling on his back more than work and gets on Fern's nerves the most. Voiced by Paul Litchfield.
- Swift is the second eldest dog, Mist's Auntie and mother of Ernie. She is very stubborn and hard-working. Voiced by Gillian Hanna
- Ernest ("Ernie") is Mist's cousin. He is a boisterous teenager who always gets into trouble. He wants to be independent, although he always sticks with his mum. Voiced by David McNeill
- Young Eddie, Jake's son, comes along after a few years (2009), and together they streak across the fields to manage the sheep.

=== Borough Farm Rams ===
- MacPhereson, known as "the angriest ram" on the farm is a bully who likes to challenge anyone who stands in his way. He is terribly stubborn, not until Mist makes him climb back up a cliff one misty morning. He is voiced by Clive Russell
- MacVicar is McPherson's friend. He too is a stubborn ram. Also voiced by David McNeill

=== Borough Farm Ducks ===
- Joyce is the first of the three sisters in the group. She is happy as Larry and loves to pretend to be a sheep to help her new friend Mist. Sandra Dickinson also voices her.
- Josephine
- Janet
- Jessica
- Steve is the only male in the flock. He is always down and whinges and feels miserable a lot.

== Television series ==
The film spawned a spin-off television series called Mist: Sheepdog Tales (2007–2009), which charts the sheepdog adventures of the adult Mist. The series aired 39 episodes during its three season run.
