= Three Crooked Men =

1958 British film by Ernest Morris

- Directed by: Ernest Morris
- Written by: Brian Clemens; Eldon Howard
- Produced by: Edward J. Danziger; Harry Lee Danziger
- Starring: Gordon Jackson; Warren Mitchell
- Cinematography: James Wilson (as Jimmy Wilson)
- Edited by: Maurice Rootes
- Music by: Edwin Astley; Albert Elms
- Production company: Danziger Productions
- Distributed by: Paramount British Pictures (UK)
- Release date: October 1958 (UK)
- Running time: 71 minutes
- Country: United Kingdom
- Language: English

Three Crooked Men is a 1958 British 'B' crime film directed by Ernest Morris and starring Gordon Jackson and Warren Mitchell. It was written by Brian Clemens and Eldon Howard.

== Plot ==
Three crooks break into a shop, planning to gain access to the bank next door. The shopkeeper has remained in the rear of the store after a drunken argument with his wife, and the men take him hostage. A passer-by, a bank employee, hears him shout, knocks on the front door, tries to help, but he too is captured. The two kidnapped men are dumped in the countryside, eventually getting free, and are recognised and arrested as the "wanted men" described in news reports. Under questioning the police do not believe their account, and decide the shopkeeper and bank employee have committed the crime. While awaiting court the two men return to the shop and find a photo which had been dropped by one of the thieves during the break-in. They decide their best chance is to track down the thieves themselves.

== Cast ==
- Gordon Jackson as Don Wescot
- Sarah Lawson as May Wescot
- Eric Pohlmann as Masters
- Philip Saville as Seppy
- Warren Mitchell as Walter Prinn
- Michael Mellinger as Vince
- Kenneth Edwards as Inspector Wheeler
- Michael Goodliffe as shop customer
- Frank Sieman as Constable Jason
- Peter Bathurst as Mr Bond
- Arnold Bell as Mr Brady, the bank manager
- Michael Allinson as photographer's assistant
- Len Sharp as Joe, proprietor of café

== Critical reception ==
The Monthly Film Bulletin wrote: "This film falls between two stools: it builds up some suspense as a crime melodrama; it is occasionally interesting as a character study of two men, Wescot and Prinn, who imagine themselves to be failures, but, as a result of the events in the story, recover their sense of purpose. But the two halves are awkwardly joined, and despite good performances from Gordon Jackson and Warren Mitchell, the long arm of coincidences is sometimes violently wrenched."

Picturegoer wrote: "Convincingly acted by Jackson the film achieves some smart suspense."

In British Sound Films: The Studio Years 1928–1959 David Quinlan rated the film as "average", writing: "Mixture of suspense-drama and character studies; not too bad."
