= The Lady Is a Tramp (TV series) =

- Written by: Johnny Speight
- Directed by: Douglas Argent; Dennis Main Wilson
- Starring: Patricia Hayes; Pat Coombs
- Country of origin: United Kingdom
- Original language: English
- No. of series: 2
- No. of episodes: 13

Production
- Production company: Regent Productions

Original release
- Network: Channel 4
- Release: 8 January 1983 – 30 March 1984

The Lady Is a Tramp is a sitcom shown on the then-new British television channel, Channel 4. Written by Johnny Speight, the programme lasted for two series, and totalled 13 episodes from 8 January 1983 to 30 March 1984.

== Synopsis ==
Old Pat and Lanky Pat are a pair of elderly tramps or "bag ladies" who have spent many years sleeping rough in such places as on park benches in London. The two move into a derelict van in an apparently unused yard. They then resist repeated attempts to move them from their new home.

== Chief characters and actresses ==
- Old Pat – played by Patricia Hayes
- Lanky Pat – played by Pat Coombs

The character of Old Pat echoes the title role in the Jeremy Sandford drama Edna the Inebriate Woman which Hayes had played in 1971, but is done with a greater sense of comedy. According to her autobiography, Hayes used costume items from her performance as Edna in the role of Old Pat.
