= In Sickness and in Health =

British TV sitcom (BBC1, 1985–92)

- Created by: Johnny Speight
- Starring: Warren Mitchell; Dandy Nichols
- Country of origin: United Kingdom
- Original language: English
- No. of series: 6
- No. of episodes: 47

Production
- Running time: 30 minutes

Original release
- Network: BBC1
- Release: 1 September 1985 – 3 April 1992

Related
- Till Death Us Do Part; Till Death...

In Sickness and in Health is a BBC television sitcom that ran between 1 September 1985 and 3 April 1992. It is a sequel to the successful Till Death Us Do Part, which ran between 1966 and 1975, and Till Death..., which ran for one series of six episodes in 1981. The series includes 47 episodes, and, unlike its predecessor, all the episodes have survived and are available on DVD.

The show's theme tune was performed by Chas and Dave and two versions of the lyrics were used – the original version in Series 1 and then revised from Series 2 onward to reflect the Else Garnett character's death. The lyrics were changed again for the episodes set in Australia during the fourth series.

== Cast ==
- Warren Mitchell as Alfred 'Alf' Garnett
- Dandy Nichols as Else Garnett (Series 1)
- Carmel McSharry as Camille Hollingbery
- Una Stubbs as Rita Rawlins (Series 1–2)
- Arthur English as Arthur (Series 1–5)
- Eamonn Walker as Winston ('Marigold') (Series 1–3)
- Ken Campbell as Fred Johnson
- Eileen Kennally as Mrs Johnson (Series 1–3)
- Gareth Forwood as The Doctor (Series 3)
- Tricia Kelly as Mrs Johnson (Series 4–5)
- Yvonne D'Alpra as Mrs Johnson (Series 6)
- Harry Fowler as Harry the milkman
- Arnold Diamond as Mr Rabinsky (Series 1–4)
- Patricia Hayes as Min Reed (Series 2–6)
- Irene Handl as Gwenneth (Series 2–3)
- Renu Setna as Mr Kittel (Series 2–3)
- Fanny Carby as The Barmaid (Series 3–5)
- Vas Blackwood as Pele (Series 4)
- Hugh Lloyd as Harry Carey (Series 4–6)
- Pat Coombs as Mrs Carey (Series 4–6)
- James Ellis as Michael (Series 6)

== Episode guide ==
=== Series 1 (1985) ===
This comedy series debuted in 1985 and took the former Till Death Us Do Part characters Alf Garnett (Warren Mitchell) and his wife Else (Dandy Nichols) from their Wapping house to a lower-class one-level flat in West Ham. Else now uses a wheelchair due to Nichols' real-life ill health.

The council sends a black, gay man named Winston (Eamonn Walker), to do the housework and help care for Else. Despite Alf's dual prejudices against Winston, eventually the two become used to one another, and Winston takes Alf to watch his beloved West Ham United. Nevertheless, Alf gives Winston the nickname "Marigold".

Alf and Else's daughter Rita (Una Stubbs) now lives with her husband Mike in his home town of Liverpool and often visits her parents, although Mike does not appear (as Tony Booth had no interest in reprising the role). Usually, Alf is seen drinking with his friend Arthur (Arthur English) in the local pub.

Although his beloved Conservative Party has returned to power, Alf is not happy with Margaret Thatcher being Prime Minister because, according to him, "a woman's place is in the home". He is also unhappy about Else needing to use a wheelchair and the fact he has to push her around everywhere and that, after a lifetime of hard work and paying contributions to the Welfare State, he has to fight the social security system for a decent living allowance.

Across the road lives Fred Johnson (Ken Campbell), a man stubborn like Alf, with whom he rarely gets along. When angry, Johnson bumps his head on the wall. His wife (first played by Eileen Kennally, from Series 1 to 3, then by Tricia Kelly in Series 4 and 5, and Yvonne D'Alpra in Series 6) has anxiety. Much of the comedy surrounding the Johnsons is based on Mrs. Johnson's sympathy towards Alf, often letting him walk all over them and much to the anger of Mr. Johnson.

Episode	First broadcast	Description
1	1 September 1985	The Garnetts are back in London. Else is severely arthritic and can barely walk and Alf extols the joys of the wheelchair he has got her, that is until he has to push her around in it. However Alf does find that the chair does come in handy for getting him on the front row at football matches of his beloved West Ham United although his response to a home win reveals that he is using it fraudulently.
2	8 September 1985	Alf complaining about his failing eyesight he takes his wife out in her wheelchair and buys her an ice cream cornet whilst avoiding giving money to the local vicar. However his poor sight proves his undoing when he accidentally goes into a ladies' toilet and is arrested as a sex pest.
3	15 September 1985	Having scrubbed the hall floor and disapproved of Else's using the milkman to place her bets, Alf feels that they are entitled to a home help but manages to antagonise three women home helps in succession. Returning from the pub he finds that the 4th home help is Winston, an extremely flamboyant gay black man who will clearly take no nonsense from him.
4	29 September 1985	Alf tries the patience of his neighbours Fred Johnson by using their phone to make a very long-winded long-distance call to his daughter Rita. After expounding upon funerals in the pub Alf repays Fred by buying him so many drinks he falls over but Alf's homeward progress pushing Else in her wheelchair also ends in drunken calamity.
5	6 October 1985	Alf's daughter Rita comes to visit and no sooner is she home Alf argues with her about her mother Else. Alf criticises Margaret Thatcher, claiming that no woman should be prime minister so Else and Rita gang up against him with Winston, who brings an equally camp friend home to throw a party for Rita. Alf is given extremely strong drink so which causes Alf to pass out while the others continue to party.
6	13 October 1985	Alf is tired of pushing Else around in her chair and he feels she should have an electric scooter instead but they cost £2500 and the lady at the Social Security office tells Alf that as long as he is around to push his wife, Else cannot have one. Using an idea from some kids with a go-kart Alf adds a lawn mower engine to Else's chair, which goes out of control foiling a bank robbery and landing him in hospital. Alf is declared a hero but following Winston's view that the robbers' accomplices may be out to get him Alf ultimately decides it is best to remain anonymous.

=== Christmas Special (1985) ===
First broadcast	Description
26 December 1985	Rita has come over for a visit, but intends on travelling back to Liverpool for Christmas. In an effort to get to stay and help look after Else, he feigns a leg injury when he falls off a ladder. At the old folk's Christmas lunch at the Church, Alf continues this pretence. However, later on, his enthusiastic participation during the after dinner dancing, reveals his sprained leg was merely just a ruse.

=== Series 2 (1986) ===
The first series ended on 13 October 1985 and was very popular in the ratings. On Boxing Day a Christmas special was aired, which was also successful. On 6 February 1986 Dandy Nichols died, aged 78.

When Dandy Nichols died, the decision was taken to continue the series, as the ratings and audience appreciation had been excellent. By the first episode of series two, her character has died of natural causes. Left alone after all the other mourners have gone home, Alf, the belligerent old curmudgeon who always treated his wife appallingly, gently touches the handle of her (now empty) wheelchair and sobs "Silly old moo!". However, Alf quickly discovers his state pension has been cut (along with entitlement to other social security benefits) as a result of Else's death. The lyrics of the theme tune (performed by Chas and Dave) were changed to reflect this:

Now my 'ol darlin, they've laid her down to rest
And now I'm missing 'er with all me heart
But they don't give a monkeys down the DHSS
And they've cornered half me pension for a start
So it won't be very long until I'm by her side
Cos I'll probably starve to death that's what I'll do
For richer or for poorer – (Alf interjects: "Bloody poorer that's a fact!")
That's 'cos in sickness and in health I said "I do"
In sickness and in health I said "I do"

In series two, Carmel McSharry became a permanent member of the cast playing Mrs Hollingbery, a gossipy, Catholic pensioner who lives in the flat upstairs. She did make an appearance in the first series but this was very low-key, and she had not been named as Mrs Hollingbery either yet. Alf and Mrs Hollingbery don't get on at first but later become close. The roles of the Johnsons increased, and several recurring characters were added including Mr Rabinsky (a tightfisted Jew), Mr Kittel (Renu Setna) a Muslim shopkeeper, Winston's cousin, and the milkman. Alf's crazy former neighbour Min Reed (Patricia Hayes) also returns for one episode, along with her sister Gwenneth (Irene Handl).

Episode	First broadcast	Description
1	4 September 1986	Else has died and following her funeral, Alf, Rita and the rest of the congregation convene back at the flat for the wake. Alf is morose when his finds out that his pension has been cut in half following his wife's death, along with the £30 a week disability allowance.
2	11 September 1986.	Rita and Winston cause a commotion late one night, when they have difficulty trying to get in, following a night out. They manage to frighten Mrs Hollingberry, who responds by locking the front door of the flat at 10:30pm each night. Later, Alf gets into a row and she threatens to lock him out if returns late from the pub.
3	18 September 1986	Mrs Hollingberry's obsession with security picks up a pace, when she locks Alf inside his own flat, but then he desperately needs to go to the toilet. Meanwhile, their shopkeeper Mr Kittel, informs Alf that Else owed him a series of debts before she died, and Alf is irritated when he finds out from the Milkman about her last bet.
4	25 September 1986	It's Sunday and Alf is annoyed that everyone else is having Sunday lunch without him. So he decides to go to the Supermarket for the first time, and later he attempts to cook his own lunch, even-though he cannot cook.
5	2 October 1986	Rita buys Alf a second-hand jacket which he soon notices is covered in medals seeing an opportunity he uses it to try to gain all sorts of special favours. Alf is also visited by canvassing politicians.
6	9 October 1986	Alf unexpectedly gets a visit from his former neighbour Min, who has come over with her sister Gwenneth who turns out to be senile and hard of hearing. Mrs Hollingberry gets annoyed by Min's presence and a quarrel erupts between them.

=== Christmas Special (1986) ===
First broadcast	Description
23 December 1986	Alf loses his job as a department stall Santa, when he gets into a heated argument with a pushy mother (Alison Steadman) who demands an extensive list of presents from him for Christmas. Later when he delivers some groceries from Mr Kittel, he bumps into her again, and she robs him off all his items. Later on Rita announces that she won in a competition a trip to Spain, Alf tries to make Rita feel sorry for him by complaining that he will be alone at Christmas.

=== Series 3 (1987) ===
During the third series, Rita divorces Mike and moves back to London to marry a doctor (although Una Stubbs did not appear in the show after series two). Eamonn Walker also left at the end of series three. Three characters from the 1970s Till Death Us Do Part also made a comeback - Mrs. Carey and her henpecked husband Wally (Pat Coombs and Hugh Lloyd, although Wally was now named Harry). Min also returns for an appearance, along with her sister Gwenneth who makes her second and final appearance in the series, as Handl died later that year.

Episode	First broadcast	Description
1	22 October 1987	Rita has left Mike for good and is divorcing him. Alf is delighted by the prospect that his daughter is coming home to stay and look after him so he starts to prepare the spare room for her. But his joy soon turns to anger when he finds out that she has been having a romantic dalliance with the local GP, Dr Thompson, who later reveals to Alf that he intends on marrying her. Alf reluctantly lets Winston lodge at his flat and use the spare room instead.
2	29 October 1987	Alf receives a leaflet about AIDS, and at the pub he complains about how foreigners have brought the disease into the country. Later Alf and Arthur visit a sex shop, where Arthur sneakily steals a sex magazine and gives it to Alf to look after. Mrs Hollingberry soon discovers it in his possession, and Alf tries to blame it on Winston, so he can get him evicted.
3	5 November 1987	Dr Thompson gives Alf and Mrs Hollingberry a new cordless telephone. Soon, they come to blows when they each try to claim ownership on the phone. Alf also causes a commotion among his neighbours when he rings everybody he knows, which leads to a series of unfortunate incidents for Arthur and Fred.
4	12 November 1987	Min and Gwenneth pay Alf another visit, and he's desperate to try and get them to leave. Gwenneth causes a commotion at the pub when she mistakes Arthur for a former boyfriend. Later that evening, Min organises a seance at the flat whilst Winston and his boyfriend try to trick Alf into believing that he can hear an otherworldly spirit.
5	19 November 1987	At a tea dance, Alf gets into a fight with Fancy Fred (Spike Milligan). One afternoon a large truck parks outside his window, and Alf confronts the driver who turns out to be the same adversary he fought at the dance. Mrs Hollingberry volunteers Alf to clean her windows and soon gets into trouble when he gets his legs caught on the window ledge.
6	26 November 1987	On one of the hottest days of the year, Alf and Winston are watching cricket on the television in the back garden. Later that day, Alf visits the DHSS where he complains about not getting enough money for last winter's heating allowance. He later returns home, to find that Arthur, Mr Kittel and Mr Rabinksky have turned up uninvited, to watch the cricket.

=== Christmas Special (1987) ===
First broadcast	Description
25 December 1987	Alf is suffering from a bad hip and soon finds himself in hospital awaiting a hip replacement. Alf is spooked when Arthur, Winston, Mrs Hollingberry, Fred and his wife come to visit him and discuss with him about various scare stories about what could go wrong in the operation. On the night before the operation, Alf escapes hospital dressed up as a woman, which incurs a drunk's amorous advances on his way back home.

=== Series 4 (1989) ===
Alf gets a new lodger, Pele, and Mrs Hollingbery starts to get closer to Alf. Eventually, Alf begins courting her and they are soon engaged. Mrs Hollingberry learns that as a couple, they can purchase their house for £20,000. Later in the series, with Arthur in tow, they travel to the Outback to meet her wealthy long-lost brother Ricky (John Bluthal) so they can get his blessing on their engagement and provide them the money towards the purchase of the house. Alf soon comes to blows with her brother and they have a fight at a drinks party to celebrate his engagement to Mrs Hollingberry. Ricky expels them and sends them back to London with their plans in disarray.

Episode	First broadcast	Description
1	7 September 1989	Alf has recovered from his hip operation and Winston has moved out. At the pub, he discusses his financial situation with Arthur, who suggests to him that he could improve his finances by marrying Mrs Hollingberry.
2	14 September 1989	Alf attempts to propose to Mrs Hollingberry but she spurns his advances and wants time to think over his proposal of marriage. Later, a surprise engagement party is thrown for them at the pub, where Mrs Hollingberry discovers that if she marries Alf, as a couple they can purchase their house from the council.
3	21 September 1989	Excitement is in the air when Arthur has a large windfall on the football pools. Upon hearing the news, Alf organises a lavish celebratory meal for Arthur. When he comes over for the meal, Arthur despondently announces that his wife has failed to post the coupon. Meanwhile, Mrs Hollingberry receives a letter from her brother Ricky in Australia who is willing to purchase their house, providing he gets to meet the groom to be.
4	28 September 1989	Alf, Mrs Hollingberry and Arthur are preparing for their trip down under. On the night before they depart, Alf is dismayed when everyone in the pub places a bet on whether the plane will crash. Back at the flat, he gets into an argument with Mrs Hollingberry about having to travel to Australia.
5	5 October 1989	During their flight to Australia, Alf's initial fears about flying are soon relieved when he gets drunk on Whisky. At the airport, he gets into a heated argument with a man, who turns out to be Mrs Hollingberry's brother. He takes them back to the house where he introduces them to his haughty wife Railene (Noeline Brown). Alf and Ricky soon quickly bond over their shared racial views.
6	12 October 1989	The following day, Ricky persuades Alf, Arthur and Mrs Hollingberry to take a sightseeing tour around Sydney. During their trip, Alf gets into a row with a lifeguard, and later on discovers that he and his bride to be have conflicting views over many things.
7	19 October 1989	After a disastrous trip to the Outback which leads to Ricky getting injured when Alf mistakes him for a Crocodile. At the flat, Alf and Arthur overhear Ricky's deceitful property plans and they decide to get their revenge on him when Ricky offers Alf a business proposition. At a drinks party to celebrate the engagement, it quickly descends into drunken chaos between the two.

=== Christmas Special (1989) ===
First broadcast	Description
25 December 1989	With the daunting prospect of another frugal Christmas. Alf deceitfully cons the local Vicar into donating him a Christmas hamper. Mrs Hollingberry is furious when she finds out that he managed to acquire it through dishonest means, so Alf takes the hamper to the pub for raffle, while making sure he puts his name on all the slips, so that he can win the prize.

=== Series 5 (1990) ===
Series five was broadcast in 1990. These episodes focused on the build-up to Alf and Mrs. Hollingberry's big day which would end in disaster when the pair fall out at the altar over the revised terms and conditions of the ceremony. Alf objecting to the removal of the "I obey" clause by the wife. Just as she rejects and abandons him in the church, Alf is reminded by Fred that he has had a "lucky escape", to which Alf angrily replies, "What do you mean? I could have watched the bloody football!!".

Episode	Title	First broadcast	Description
1	Power Cut	1 September 1990	Due to a power cut, Alf and Mrs Hollingberry go off to the pub, where Alf complains about Thatcher and a heated argument develops between Fred and Arthur. Later when Alf and Mrs Hollingberry return home, the lights have gone back on and he moans at her for wasting electricity.
2	Suicide	8 September 1990	As a means of getting more money before their wedding, Mrs Hollingberry gets a job. Alf is disgusted by the idea and tries to fake an overdose in order to prevent her from leaving, but she's not convinced. Feeling dejected, Alf goes off to the pub where he has a long conversation with Arthur about suicide and death.
3	X-Rays	15 September 1990	Mrs Hollingberry wants Alf to take out life insurance in case he dies first. At the pub, a chat about health does nothing to relieve Mrs Carey's fears of getting a hip replacement. Another row between the Johnsons convinces Alf to surmise that Fred may be poisoning his wife.
4	Window Cleaning	22 September 1990	Alf gets a job, working for Mrs Carey as a window cleaner, but he fails to clean any windows due to the confusing instruction given by her husband. Later, Alf sees the Milkman in a compromising position with one of his customers, and he manages to bribe him in return for free groceries. Meanwhile, Arthur wins the jackpot on the fruit machine at Royal British Legion Club. He splits the winnings with Alf, providing they keep quiet about it.
5	Dogs	28 September 1990	At the pub, Alf and Arthur are discussing about the past, when Arthur reminisces about his time as the captain of the West Ham juniors football team. Later Alf tries to earn money by becoming a dog walker, but he finds that the two large dogs he's been tasked to look after quite a handful and soon chaos erupts and he gets into trouble with an irate housewife.
6	Jury	6 October 1990	One morning, Alf receives an official letter, and he gets nervous about opening it. After much discussion with Mrs Hollingberry, he opens it and is delighted that he's been called up for jury service. At the pub he boasts about how honoured it is to be called up, until Fred dampens his enthusiasm when he informs him about a juror who was hospitalised after sending a man down. On the way back home from the pub, Alf is convinced that he's been followed by a stalker.
7	Courtroom	13 October 1990	Alf's first day in jury service is approaching and he tries to get prepared. At the pub, he gets into a heated argument about justice with Harry and Mr Carey about how the jury system is corrupt, whilst he continues to get teased by Fred who again frightens him about his tales of retribution on members of the jury. On the day Alf takes his place in the jury box, Mrs Hollingberry irons his trousers badly, and he tries to disguise himself by wearing a false beard.
8	Bus	20 October 1990	Alf is thrown off a bus for not having a bus pass. Later he organises a pensioners outing and encourages them to board the same bus since they all have bus passes. During the course of the journey, Alf gets into an argument with an Irishman (Frank Kelly), directs the ladies to use the men's toilets to relieve queuing and eventually the pensioners get drunk and rowdy.
9	Storm	27 October 1990	With their wedding only a few weeks away, Mrs Hollingberry instructs Alf to give up drinking and smoking, so he tries to do it in secrecy. Later that evening a tremendous storm dislodges his secret money box which he has been hiding in the chimney. To his chagrin, Mrs Hollingberry tries to claim half of the money.
10	Wedding	3 November 1990	On the eve of his wedding to Mrs Hollingberry, Alf has a long conversation with the Catholic priest who is marrying them. At his stag night down the pub, Alf is irritated to find that all his friends have whipped round to give him a cheap cutlery set as a wedding present. The big day comes along, and at the church, Alf and Mrs Hollingberry get into a heated argument whilst trying to do their wedding vows. She eventually jilts him at the altar.

=== Christmas Special (1990) ===
First broadcast	Description
30 December 1990	After being jilted at the altar, a dejected Alf goes off to the pub. Later, Mrs Hollingberry goes to church for confession when the Priest berates her for her behaviour against Alf and should do penance. She does this by cooking and cleaning for Alf, which he soon uses for his advantage. He soon pretends that he's booked a luxury Christmas holiday for the pair of them.

=== Series 6 (1992) ===
In 1992, after over a year off the air, the sitcom returned for the sixth and final series of seven episodes in which Alf discovers a ton of banknotes and becomes very rich. During the final series, Arthur did not appear, due to Arthur English suffering from ill health, and so Alf gained a new friend, the Irishman Michael (played by James Ellis). Tricia Kelly departed, so Mrs. Johnson runs off with another woman. The character did briefly appear in this series, but was portrayed by Yvonne D'Alpra (the third person to play the role). The last episode aired on 3 April 1992.

Episode	First broadcast	Description
1	21 February 1992	Alf tries to unblock Mrs Hollingberry's sink, even-though she intends to call for a plumber. Their scrounging friend Michael arrives and unexpectedly decides to stay round for dinner even-though Mrs Hollingberry only cooked enough for two. Alf later is driven to desperation when an alarm on a car parked outside his house goes off. He later gets into an altercation with two workmen who are digging a hole in the street.
2	28 February 1992	At a football game, Alf offends one of the West Ham players. In order to earn some extra cash, Alf gets a job delivering newspapers using a wheelchair. Alf tries to improve his efficiency by hooking the wheelchair to a Milk Float, but he soon find himself careering downhill and he ends up in a swimming pool, which happens to be owed by the same West Ham player he recently offended.
3	6 March 1992	Mrs Hollingberry is disgusted by Alf's personal hygiene habits when he tries to cut his toenails. At the pub, Alf discovers that Fred's wife has left him for another woman, and she intends to move her to their marital home. Alf complains about the French introducing permissiveness into the country and soon gets rebuked by Mrs Johnson for his comments.
4	13 March 1992	After injuring her leg, Mrs Hollingberry finds herself confined to the house. Alf is irritated by the situation since he has to look after himself, and he gets her doctor to visit the house after confronting him at the surgery. During the doctor's visit, he gets more than he bargained for when he gets himself imposed upon by Michael and the Carey's about their ailments.
5	20 March 1992	Alf finds a suitcase full of cash hidden in a wardrobe that he's trying to move for Mrs Hollingberry. He then gets trapped inside the wardrobe and overhears her talking to Mrs Carey, when she admits she only wanted to marry him for his money, so he does not tell her about the cash. He takes the money to set up an account at a bank, but is dismayed when he is asked to explain how he came to have so much cash which is in old notes no longer of legal tender, which may also cause issues with the tax office.
6	27 March 1992	Having managed to deposit his money in several bank accounts under various assumed names, Alf returns home to find his furniture has been stolen. He splashes out the cash, purchasing new furniture, some wall paintings and a large television set. Alf later visits a Harley Street doctor, when he becomes concerned about his health.
7	3 April 1992	Alf purchases a new snooker table and installs it in the living room, which barely leaves enough space to get around. He takes Fred as his new lodger, and is later visited by Min, whom confesses that she still has amorous intentions towards him. They are soon joined by the bank manager who pays them a visit, and brings with him an official from the tax office to investigate Alf's newfound wealth.

== History ==
=== Cancellation ===
On 29 September 1993, despite talks about the 7th series going forward, the show got axed by the BBC due to Alf's behaviour.

=== After the cancellation ===
Warren Mitchell would continue to perform as Alf Garnett on special occasions; this meant on stage in front of a live audience, and similarly to an invited audience consisting largely of celebrities and public figures.

In 1997, a number of special shows were arranged for Granada Television, in which Alf would be in his front room in the company of Mrs Hollingberry or in the pub with a drinking partner. The material was written by Johnny Speight and Alf now grumbles about the Labour Party being returned to power under Tony Blair.

After Johnny Speight's death in 1998, Warren Mitchell decided that he no longer wanted to play Alf.

=== International versions ===
In 1991 a Dutch version of the series, In voor en tegenspoed ("In good times and in bad"), debuted on Dutch TV. According to the end credits only the first 12 episodes are based on Speight's original scripts. Two more series of episodes were written by Paul-Jan Nelissen and Marc Nelissen. The Dutch Alf Garnett is called Fred Schuit (played by Rijk de Gooyer). He lives in Amsterdam, supports AFC Ajax, drinks jenever for medicinal reasons, and does not trust a TV-set unless it is made in Eindhoven. The series was awarded two Awards of the Dutch Academy.

== DVD releases ==
- Series 1: 9 June 2008
- Series 2: 22 September 2008
- Christmas Specials: 3 November 2008
- Series 3: 23 March 2009
- Series 4: 13 July 2009
- Series 5: 12 July 2010
- Series 6: 13 September 2010
- The Complete Collection: 13 September 2010
