= Una Stubbs =

British actress, television personality, and dancer (1937–2021)

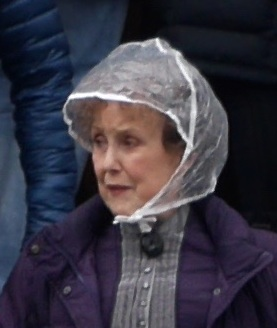
- Stubbs in 2015, while filming Sherlock
- Born: 1 May 1937; Welwyn Garden City, Hertfordshire, England
- Died: 12 August 2021 (aged 84); Edinburgh, Scotland
- Occupations: Actress, dancer, TV presenter
- Years active: 1956–2017
- Spouses: Peter Gilmore (m. 1958; div. 1969) Nicky Henson (m. 1969; div. 1975)
- Children: 3; including Christian Henson
- Relatives: Ebenezer Howard (great-grandfather); Geoffrey Howard (uncle)

Una Stubbs (1 May 1937 – 12 August 2021) was an English actress, television personality, and dancer who appeared on British television, in the theatre, and occasionally in films. She became known after appearing in the film Summer Holiday (1963) and later played Rita Rawlins in the BBC sitcoms Till Death Us Do Part (1965–1975) and In Sickness and in Health (1985–1992). Her other television roles include Aunt Sally in Worzel Gummidge (1979–1981) and Miss Bat in The Worst Witch (1998–2001). She also appeared as Sherlock Holmes's landlady Mrs. Hudson in the BAFTA-winning television series Sherlock (2010–2017) where she was nominated for Best Supporting Actress at the Crime Thriller Awards.

== Early life ==
Stubbs was born in 1937 in Welwyn Garden City, Hertfordshire, the daughter of Angela K. Rawlinson and Clarence Reginald Stubbs. Stubbs was a great-granddaughter of Sir Ebenezer Howard, the founder of the garden city movement, who was the driving force in the creation of Letchworth Garden City and Welwyn Garden City, both in Hertfordshire.

She grew up in Hinckley, Leicestershire, and was sent to La Roche dancing school in Slough by her mother. As a 16-year-old, in 1953, she danced in a Folies Bergère-style musical revue, "Pardon My French", at the Prince of Wales Theatre, alongside Frankie Howerd and the pianist Winifred Atwell. She first appeared on television as one of the Dougie Squires Dancers on the British television music show Cool for Cats (ITV) in 1956. She also appeared as a dancer at the London Palladium and worked in cabaret, clubs and revues in London, and was in Lionel Blair's dance ensemble.

During 1958–59, Stubbs was the "cover girl" of Dairy Box chocolates, produced by Rowntree. She referred to herself as the "Rowntree's Chocolate Girl", when describing a visit she made to the Rowntree's factory in York (where unknown to her, her grandfather had worked).

== Acting career ==
In 1963, Stubbs joined the cast of a new charades-based gameshow, Don't Say a Word (ITV), a forerunner of Give Us a Clue. Her first screen role was in the Cliff Richard film Summer Holiday (1963). She also appeared in Richard's next film, Wonderful Life (1964). Soon afterward, she made her breakthrough in television comedy, playing Rita, the married daughter of Alf Garnett in the BBC sitcom Till Death Us Do Part (1966–1975). In 1968, as a direct spin-off from the sitcom, she appeared alongside Warren Mitchell in a series of television adverts for Findus frozen products.

She also appeared in the short-lived sitcom Till Death... (1981), again playing Rita. She played Rita a third time in a few episodes of the BBC sitcom In Sickness and in Health (1985–1992). During 1970–71, Stubbs teamed again with Cliff Richard to appear each week on his BBC1 TV series, It's Cliff Richard! When she did not take part in the next series, as it was broadcast shortly after she had had a baby, her TV "mother", Dandy Nichols from Till Death Us Do Part, took her place.

Stubbs featured in the Fawlty Towers episode "The Anniversary" in 1979. From 1979 to 1981, she played Aunt Sally in the ITV children's series Worzel Gummidge opposite Jon Pertwee and Barbara Windsor, and was for several years a team captain in the weekly game show Give Us a Clue in the 1980s, reuniting her with Lionel Blair, the other team captain.

She appeared in the shows Midsomer Murders, Heartbeat, Casualty, Keeping Up Appearances, Born and Bred and The Worst Witch. In recent years, Stubbs also appeared in Victoria Wood's We'd Quite Like to Apologise, The Catherine Tate Show, Agatha Christie's Marple, EastEnders, Benidorm and, from 2010, Sherlock as Mrs. Hudson where she was nominated for Best Supporting Actress at the Crime Thriller Awards. She appeared in an episode of Call the Midwife in 2015.

Stubbs was on the West End stage in Noël Coward's Star Quality with Penelope Keith in 2001 and Friedrich Schiller's Don Carlos with Derek Jacobi in 2005. Her other theatre credits included La Cage Aux Folles at the Menier Chocolate Factory, Pygmalion at the Theatre Royal, Bath and Old Vic and The Family Reunion at the Donmar Warehouse. She was in the original cast of The Curious Incident of the Dog in the Night-Time at the National Theatre in 2012.

In 2015 she co-presented The Big Painting Challenge on BBC One alongside Richard Bacon.

== Personal life ==
Stubbs was married to the actor Peter Gilmore from 1958 to 1969: they adopted a son, Jason. After their divorce in 1969, she married another actor, Nicky Henson. They divorced in 1975, after having two sons, but remained good friends. Their sons are the composer Christian Henson (born 25 December 1971), and the musician-composer Joe Henson (born 18 September 1973).

For many years, Stubbs sketched vignettes of characters around London and held exhibitions of these near her London home. On several occasions, paintings by Stubbs, submitted anonymously, were exhibited at the Royal Academy's Summer Exhibition, most recently in 2020.

Stubbs had known her Sherlock co-star Benedict Cumberbatch since he was four years old, as she had worked with his mother, Wanda Ventham.

Stubbs was the subject of an episode of the BBC series Who Do You Think You Are?, broadcast on 24 July 2013. It discussed several of her ancestors.

After several months of ill health, Stubbs died at her home in Edinburgh on 12 August 2021, at the age of 84.

== Filmography ==
=== Film ===
Year	Title	Role	Notes	Ref
1963	Summer Holiday	Sandy		
1963	West 11	Girl on Her Knees at Party	Uncredited	
1964	The Bargee	Bridesmaid	Uncredited	
1964	Wonderful Life	Barbara Tate		
1965	Three Hats for Lisa	Flora		
1967	Mister Ten Per Cent	Lady Dorothea		
1969	Till Death Us Do Part	Rita Garnett Rawlins		
1973	Penny Gold	Anna		
1974	Bedtime with Rosie	Rosie		
1978	The Water Babies		Voice	
2007	Angel	Miss Dawson		
2016	National Theatre Live: Les Liaisons Dangereuses	Madame de Rosemond		
2016	Golden Years	Shirley		

=== Television ===
Year	Title	Role	Notes	Ref
1960	The Strange World of Gurney Slade	Vacuum Cleaner Girl / Girl in Park	2 episodes	
1966–1975	Till Death Us Do Part	Rita Garnett Rawlins	52 episodes	
1971	The Rivals of Sherlock Holmes	Katie Harris	Episode: "The Woman in the Big Hat"	
1970–1972	It's Cliff Richard!	Herself	33 episodes	
1978	Whodunnit?	Herself – panellist	TV game show	
1979	Fawlty Towers	Alice	Episode: "The Anniversary"	
1979–1981	Worzel Gummidge	Aunt Sally	21 episodes	
1979–1986	Give Us a Clue	Herself	Multiple episodes	
1981	Till Death...	Rita Garnett Rawlins	6 episodes	
1985–1986	In Sickness and in Health	Rita Garnett Rawlins	9 episodes	
1987–1989	Worzel Gummidge Down Under	Aunt Sally	22 episodes	
1989	Victoria Wood	Una	Episode: "We'd Quite Like to Apologise"	
1989	Tricky Business	Mrs. Breeze	9 episodes	
1995	Keeping Up Appearances	Mrs. Moody	Episode: "The Pageant"	
1995, 1997	Heartbeat	Anthea Cowley	2 episodes	
1996	Delta Wave	Gilly Pigeon	4 episodes	
1998	Midsomer Murders	Selina Jennings	Episode: "Written in Blood"	
2000	Casualty	Joan Banville	Episode: "Not Waving but Drowning"	
1998–2000	The Worst Witch	Miss Davina Bat	25 episodes	
2003	Born and Bred	Joy	Episode: "A Very Ormston Christmas"	
2004	Von Trapped	Kath Moogan	TV movie	
2005–2007	The Catherine Tate Show	Carole-Ann & Ursula	4 episodes	
2006	EastEnders	Caroline Bishop	6 episodes	
2006	Agatha Christie's Marple	Edith Pagett	Episode: "Sleeping Murder"	
2007–2009	Mist: Sheepdog Tales	Fern	23 episodes	
2009	Benidorm	Diana Armstrong	Season 3 Episode 5	
2009	Ingenious	Gransha	TV movie	
2010–2017	Sherlock	Mrs. Hudson	13 episodes	
2011	The Bleak Old Shop of Stuff	Aunt Good Spelling	Episode: "Christmas Special"	
2012	Celebrity Antiques Road Trip	Herself	Season 2 Episode 4	
2012	National Theatre Live	Mrs. Alexander	Episode: "The Curious Incident of the Dog in the Night-Time"	
2013	Who Do You Think You Are?	Herself	Series 10, Episode 1	
2013	Starlings	Molly	4 episodes	
2013	Coming Up	Cynthia	Episode: "Sink Or Swim"	
2013	The Tractate Middoth	Miss Chambers		
2015	Midsomer Murders	Audrey Braylesford	Episode 17.1 "The Dagger Club"	
2015	The Big Painting Challenge	Co-Presenter	Series 1	
2015	Call The Midwife	Gert Mills	Episode #4.7	
2017	The Durrells	Mrs. Haddock	Series 2, Episode 4	
2017	Murder on the Blackpool Express	Peggy	TV movie, final film role	

=== Audio dramas ===
Year	Title	Role	Ref
2007	Doctor Who: Horror of Glam Rock	Flo	

=== Theatre ===
Year	Title	Playwright	Director	Role	Venue	Ref
1990	She Stoops to Conquer	Oliver Goldsmith	James Maxwell	Mrs Hardcastle	Royal Exchange, Manchester	
1992	An Ideal Husband	Oscar Wilde	James Maxwell	Lady Markby	Royal Exchange, Manchester	
1996	The Philadelphia Story	Philip Barry	Josephine Abady	Margaret Lord	Royal Exchange, Manchester	
1997	The Deep Blue Sea	Terence Rattigan	Michael Grandage	Hester Collyer	Mercury Theatre, Colchester	
2001	Star Quality	Noël Coward	Christopher Luscombe	Marion Blakely	Apollo Theatre, London	
2005	Don Carlos	Friedrich von Schiller	Michael Grandage	Duchess of Olivarez	Gielgud Theatre, London	
