= Till Death... =

British TV sitcom (1981)

- Created by: Johnny Speight
- Starring: Warren Mitchell; Dandy Nichols; Patricia Hayes; Una Stubbs
- Country of origin: United Kingdom
- Original language: English
- No. of series: 1
- No. of episodes: 6

Production
- Running time: 30 minutes
- Production company: ATV

Original release
- Network: ITV
- Release: 22 May – 3 July 1981

Related
- Till Death Us Do Part; In Sickness and in Health

Till Death... is a British sitcom of six episodes that was produced by ATV and aired on ITV from 22 May to 3 July 1981. It is a continuation of the BBC sitcom Till Death Us Do Part that aired from 1965 to 1975. The title was changed to Till Death... because the title Till Death Us Do Part was controlled by the BBC.

== Series ==
The show saw the return of East End bigot Alf Garnett (Warren Mitchell). He and his wife Else (Dandy Nichols) have now retired to Eastbourne. They are sharing a bungalow with Min (Patricia Hayes) following the death of her husband Bert. Mike and Rita, characters from Till Death Us Do Part, were no longer main characters. Una Stubbs returned for three episodes as Rita together with her son Michael, but although her layabout husband Mike was talked about, he was never seen.

Michael (born in Till Death Us Do Part in September 1972) had seemingly become a victim of soap opera rapid aging syndrome as he had reached the age of 16 and become a punk rocker, much to Alf's dismay.

The show was not as successful as its predecessor, mainly because of the huge differences from Till Death Us Do Part. When ATV's successor, Central Television, began transmission in 1982, they came to the decision to discontinue the series.

== Main cast ==
- Warren Mitchell – Alf Garnett
- Dandy Nichols – Elsie "Else" Garnett
- Patricia Hayes – Min Reed
- Una Stubbs – Rita Rawlins
- John Fowler – Michael Rawlins Jr.

== Crew ==
- Johnny Speight – writer
- William G. Stewart – director / producer

== DVD release ==
Till Death...: The Complete Series was released on DVD on 28 January 2019. Reviews of the DVD release were few, and middling.
