= Till Death Us Do Part =

British television sitcom (1965–1975)

- Original opening titles
- Created by: Johnny Speight
- Starring: Warren Mitchell; Anthony Booth; Dandy Nichols; Una Stubbs; Patricia Hayes; Alfie Bass
- Country of origin: United Kingdom
- Original language: English
- No. of series: 7
- No. of episodes: 54 (13 missing) + 3 shorts (list of episodes)

Production
- Running time: 20–40 minutes
- Production company: BBC

Original release
- Network: BBC1
- Release: 22 July 1965 – 17 December 1975

Related
- Till Death...; In Sickness and in Health

Till Death Us Do Part is a British television sitcom that aired on BBC1 from 1965 to 1975. The show was first broadcast in 1965 as a Comedy Playhouse pilot, then as seven series between 1966 and 1975. In 1981, ITV continued the sitcom for six episodes, calling it Till Death.... The BBC produced a sequel from 1985 until 1992, In Sickness and in Health.

Created by Johnny Speight, Till Death Us Do Part centred on the East End Garnett family, led by patriarch Alf Garnett (Warren Mitchell), a reactionary white working-class man who holds racist and anti-socialist views. His long-suffering wife Else was played by Dandy Nichols, and his daughter Rita by Una Stubbs. Rita's husband Mike Rawlins (Anthony Booth) is a socialist "layabout" from Liverpool who frequently locks horns with Garnett. Alf Garnett became a well-known character in British culture, and Mitchell played him on stage and television until Speight's death in 1998.

In addition to the spin-off In Sickness and in Health, Till Death Us Do Part was remade in several countries including Germany (Ein Herz und eine Seele), and the Netherlands (as Tot de dood ons scheidt) in 1969 and as Met goed fatsoen in 1975, the latter was never broadcast; In Sickness and in Health was adapted as In voor- en tegenspoed in 1991–1997). It is also the show that inspired All in the Family in the United States, which, in turn, inspired the Brazilian A Grande Família. Many episodes from the first three series are thought no longer to exist, having been destroyed in the late 1960s and early 1970s as was the policy at the time.

In 2000, the show was ranked number 88 on the 100 Greatest British Television Programmes list compiled by the British Film Institute. The title is a reference to the Marriage Liturgy from the Book of Common Prayer.

== Series ==
=== Success years ===
The series became an instant hit because, although a comedy, it dealt with aspects of working-class life comparatively realistically and in the context of its time. It addressed racial and political issues that had been becoming increasingly prevalent in British society. Mitchell imbued the character of Alf Garnett with an earthy charm that served to humanise Alf and make him likeable. According to interviews he gave, the fact that some viewers overlooked Alf's racist views and regarded him as a "rough diamond" disappointed Speight.

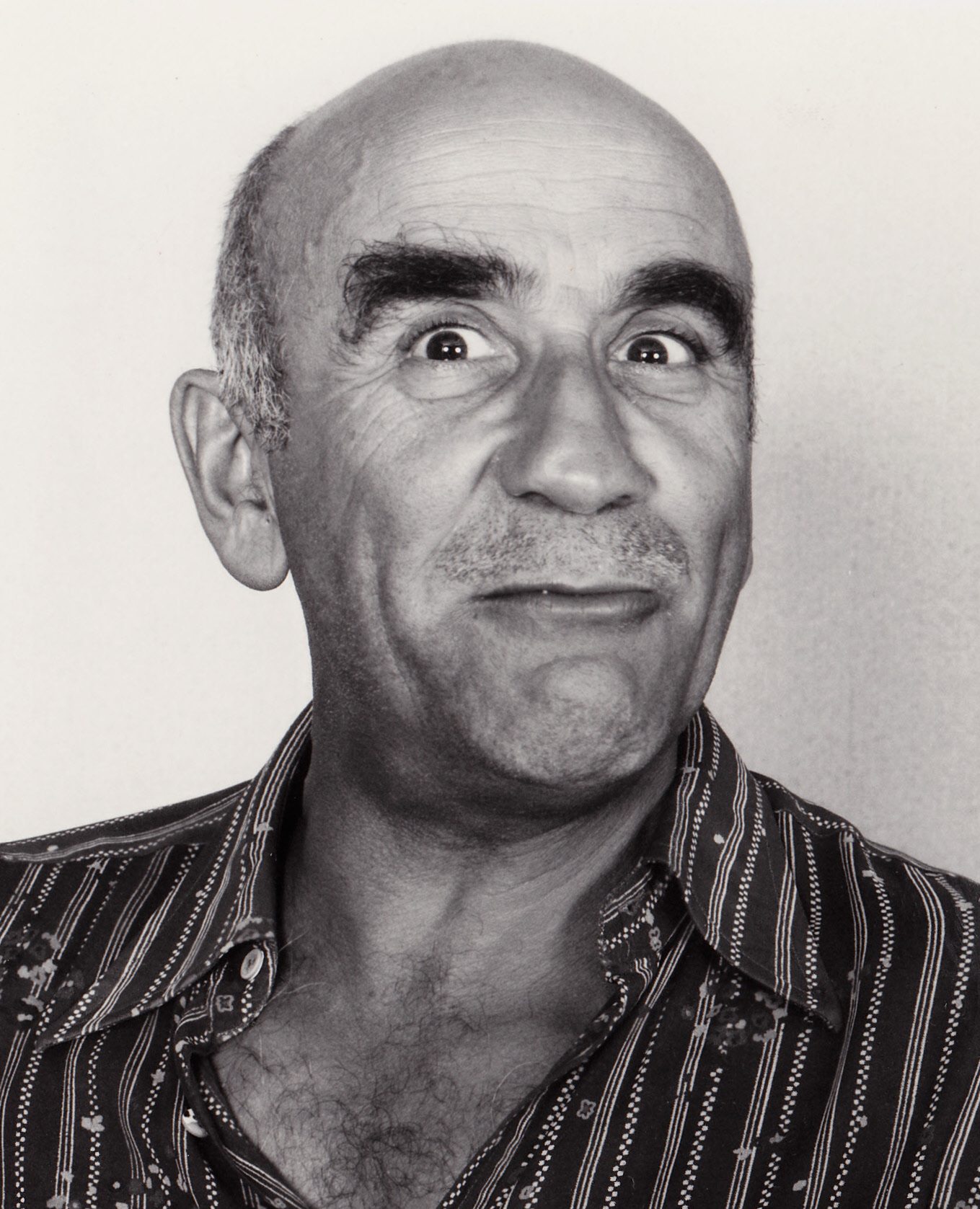
Warren Mitchell, who played Alf Garnett in the series

The show captured a key feature of Britain in the 1960s – the public perception that the generation gap was widening. Alf, and to a lesser degree his wife, represented the old guard, the traditional and conservative attitudes of the older generation. Alf's battles with his left-wing son-in-law were not just ideological but generational and cultural. His son-in-law and daughter represented the younger generation. They supported the aspects of the new era, such as relaxed sexual norms, as well as new fashions and styles of music. The same things were anathema to Alf and in his opinion indicative of everything that was wrong with the younger generation and the liberal attitudes they embraced.

Alf was portrayed as the archetypal working-class Conservative. His two primary passions were football and politics, though his actual knowledge of either was limited. He used language considered unacceptable for television in the 1960s. He often referred to racial minorities as "coons" and similar terms. He referred to his Liverpudlian son-in-law as "Shirley Temple" or a "randy Scouse git" (a phrase that caught the ear of Micky Dolenz of the Monkees, who heard it while on tour in the UK and used it as the title of the group's next single – though their record label renamed it "Alternate Title" in the UK market to avoid controversy), and to his wife as a "silly [old] moo" (a substitute for "cow" which was vetoed by the BBC's head of comedy Frank Muir). Michael Palin wrote in his diary for 16 July 1976 that Warren Mitchell told him that "silly moo" was not scripted: "It came out during a rehearsal when he forgot the line 'Silly old mare'." Controversially, the show was one of the earliest mainstream programmes to feature the swear word "bloody". The show was one of many held up by Mary Whitehouse as an example of the BBC's "moral laxity".

In a demonstration of Speight's satirical skills – after a successful libel action brought against Speight by Whitehouse – he created an episode, first broadcast on 27 February 1967, in which Alf Garnett is depicted as an admirer of Whitehouse. Garnett was seen proudly reading her first book. "What are you reading?" his son-in-law asks. When he relates that it is Mary Whitehouse, his son-in-law sniggers. Alf's response is "She's concerned for the bleedin' moral fibre of the nation!" The episode ends with the book being burnt.

Ultimately "silly moo" became a comic catchphrase. Another Garnett phrase was "it stands to reason", usually before making some patently unreasonable comment. Alf was portrayed as an admirer of Enoch Powell, a right-wing Conservative politician known particularly for his strong opposition to the immigration of people from non-white countries. Alf was also a supporter of West Ham United (a football club based in the East End) and known to make derogatory remarks about "the Jews up at Spurs" (referring to Tottenham Hotspur, a north London club with a sizeable Jewish following). This was a playful touch by Speight, as Warren Mitchell was both Jewish and a Tottenham Hotspur supporter.

In interviews, Speight explained he had originally based Alf on his father, an East End docker who was staunchly reactionary and held "unenlightened" attitudes toward black people. Speight made clear that he regretted that his father held such attitudes, which Speight regarded as reprehensible. Speight saw the show as a way of ridiculing such views and dealing with his complex feelings about his father.

It was later claimed in the book about the series, A Family at War by Mark Ward, that the only similarities between Alf and Speight's father were that his father was a hard-working, working-class East End docker and manual labourer who voted Conservative, revered traditional British values, and was very polite to everyone he met, no matter their background. It is claimed that Speight picked up the idea for Alf's bigoted personality from railway station porters he met when he had worked in temporary jobs for British Rail in the London area. The political views of both Alf and Mike were reflective of Speight's own perception of people both on the left and the right, with the ignorance and bigotry of those on the right represented by Alf and the idealism of many sections of the left represented by Mike.

=== Original decline ===
Johnny Speight gained a reputation for late delivery of scripts, sometimes unfinished and still in the form of rough notes (which would be finished and finalised as a script by the script editor and cast during rehearsals), either close to, on, or occasionally past the deadline. This was claimed by Speight to ensure maximum topicality for the series, although this was disputed by the programme's first producer, Dennis Main Wilson, who stated that Speight was frequently found late at night in a regular selection of West End bars, and that on more than one occasion the writer had to be physically dragged out of such establishments by Wilson and driven home to get the scripts typed up and finished.

This was the reason for the second series consisting of ten episodes rather than the commissioned thirteen. As three scripts that were scheduled to be recorded and broadcast towards the end of that series were not ready and actors, crew and Speight had already been paid in advance for thirteen episodes, it was decided that an Easter Monday bank holiday special – "Till Closing Time Us Do Part" – would be made and that this would mostly be made up of the cast and crew ad-libbing within the broad confines of a plot. For accounting reasons, this would be considered an 11th episode of the second series. At double the usual length, it also made up for screen time of a 12th episode. The addition of this episode meant that only one week's worth of pay was wasted, rather than three. Normally, a sitcom would have plenty of time (ranging from several weeks to several months) between recording and transmission to iron out any such script delivery problems. To ensure maximum topicality, most episodes of the second series of Till Death Us Do Part were recorded less than seven days before their intended transmission date, and as all studios would be booked on other nights for other – sometimes more important – productions, this meant that the recording of Till Death Us Do Part episodes could not be moved to another night or another studio should the script not be ready in time for rehearsals or recording. Should this happen (which it did towards the end of the second series), this would mean no episode ready for transmission that week and, because of the very short gap between recording and transmission and lack of unbroadcast episodes to replace them, other programmes had to be used to fill in the schedule in the last three planned weeks of the second series' thirteen-episode run. It is because of these problems of topicality delaying (sometimes cancelling) scripts that the third series is noticeably less topical than the second and had some weeks between recording and transmission to act as a "cushion" to ensure continuity of the series should one or more episodes fall through.

The late delivery of scripts had been a problem that had first reared its head during production of the first series. The second series got off to a good start in this respect with the first four scripts being delivered ahead of the deadline, but it became clear as that series wore on that Speight was having these problems again. Amongst a myriad of other problems (detailed below), the final straw for the original run appears to have been a script in the final (third) series of eight episodes not being delivered in time for rehearsals to begin and thus losing one episode. This confirmed to the BBC their suspicions that Speight was not an ideal writer to be writing for a topical sitcom.

To combat these problems, it was suggested by the production team that there be "windows" or "spaces" within the script that could easily be excised and replaced with more topical jokes (a frequent tactic used in other topical sitcoms like Yorkshire Television's The New Statesman twenty years later), a suggestion that was initially refused by Speight in the 1960s run of the series but which was taken up during the 1970s run. This came to be particularly useful to ensure maximum topicality during the 1974 series, some episodes of which reflected and satirised the UK miners' strike and the Three-Day Week. Speight's initial refusal to accept these suggestions, combined with his constant demands of pay increases (eventually becoming the highest-paid comedy writer and then – after another increase – the highest-paid TV writer, during a time of strict public-sector pay restraints imposed by the Labour government of Harold Wilson, which was a source of particular embarrassment to the BBC) and the increasing clashes he and the BBC were having with Mary Whitehouse, came to a head. Over time, Mary Whitehouse and the National Viewers' and Listeners' Association (NVLA) had several court cases with the BBC directly or indirectly related to the series, some of which Whitehouse or the NVLA won. During the first two series, the programme was originally broadcast on weeknights in a 7:30pm timeslot, before the post-9pm "watershed", and both Whitehouse and Speight campaigned for such a change in scheduling, the only aspect of the programme that they agreed upon. The reluctance of the BBC to reschedule the series at first can possibly be explained in the fact that the "watershed" was a relatively new phenomenon at the time and there was no consensus between the BBC and the ITA over what should and should not constitute family-friendly broadcasting, nor when this "watershed" should start, the responsibility over what constituted family-friendly viewing being primarily placed with the child's parents.

Public outcry over the episode "The Blood Donor" as being a particularly distasteful episode and a new Chairman of the BBC Board of Governors – Lord Hill (who had been appointed as Lord Normanbrook's successor when Normanbrook died suddenly in June 1967) – taking a rather different, more conservative approach to the running of the BBC than the liberal and laid-back attitude of his predecessor, were two other factors that turned up the heat of criticism against the series. Lord Hill had previously been the chairman of the Independent Television Authority and ensured that the ITV network remained relatively controversy-free. He shared many of the same opinions as Whitehouse and the wider NVLA, which also clashed with the opinions of the then BBC Director General, Hugh Carleton Greene (he is quoted as having the "utmost contempt" for Hill), who had been the series' biggest champion and gleefully ignored Whitehouse whenever he had to. Many other members of BBC management also voiced their opinions directly to Hill over his appointment, most notably the then Controller of BBC2, David Attenborough, who compared Hill being Chairman of the BBC Board of Governors to "giving Rommel the command of the Eighth Army". Neither Hill nor his predecessor, Normanbrook, had any direct influence over the series itself (as the BBC Charter prohibits this), but their relationship with the Director-General indirectly influenced the programme. Because of his total personality and culture clash with Hill, Greene resigned in July 1968 (soon after the series ended its original run) and, with the series' biggest champion now out of the BBC, it looked like the show would be cancelled. Another champion of the series – Head of Comedy output at the BBC, Frank Muir had resigned his post between the second and third series to take up a new, similar, post at David Frost's fledgling new ITV franchise London Weekend Television, which would launch on 2 August 1968. His replacement, Michael Mills, recognised that the series had enormous potential but did not understand why it had to be so topical, controversial or full of swearing and blasphemy, which hugely irritated Speight.

The final straw for the BBC at this time came when a script for the third series, which was intended to be made up of eight episodes, was so late that it missed the scheduled beginning of rehearsals. This episode was intended to be between the fourth and fifth episodes, putting a break in the recording dates and leading to one week's less space between recording and transmission of episodes.

Given the problems the series had given the BBC with steep pay increases in the midst of a government-imposed public sector pay freeze, scripts being delivered in varying degrees of completeness (and sometimes not at all), several court cases (usually libel or blasphemy), hundreds of complaints, several run-ins with Mary Whitehouse and the NVLA, the loss of the series' two biggest champions (first Frank Muir, then Hugh Carleton Greene), the new management having different opinions over the programme and the general stress its production placed on staff (primarily down to the incomplete scripts submitted by Speight), all despite its ratings success over ITV (particularly over Coronation Street) in its first two series and its general popularity as a whole, contributed to the BBC getting cold feet over the programme. A planned fourth series, scheduled for autumn 1968, was scrapped.

=== Revival ===
The programme was revived in 1972, during a time when the BBC were reviving some of their more successful sitcoms from the 1960s for colour production (Steptoe and Son being an example). A contributory factor to this decision may have been that, since the ITV franchise changes of the summer of 1968, ITV had paid a lot more attention to making sitcoms, particularly those featuring, and appealing to, the working class, which had previously been the preserve of the BBC during the 1960s. This can be attributed as a direct effect of the popularity of Till Death Us Do Part, The Likely Lads and Steptoe and Son, which were the first sitcoms to truly depict the realities of working-class life in Britain and were not set in typical "middle-class sitcom suburbia". In amongst these programmes, Till Death Us Do Part would not look as out of place as it did in the late 1960s, particularly now as the show would be less topical (bar some 1974 episodes) but no less political or controversial, as it had originally been. This was of great help to Speight, as it now meant that he did not have to wait until the very last minute to submit completed or half-completed scripts.

=== Second decline ===
This was also the series' downfall, as viewers noted the increasingly less-topical plots and the satire was much less vicious than it had been in the 1960s, with the style of the series in both 1975 series bearing little semblance to those transmitted in the late 1960s. Speight has put this down not only to reducing the pressures of working on a topical sitcom but also to his own personal declining interest in politics, which may be an explanation of why In Sickness and In Health was much less political, and not as vicious as its predecessor could be.

Additionally, towards the end of the series Dandy Nichols fell ill and was unable to attend the live-audience recordings. So, in a later episode Else was seen leaving for Australia, to Alf's dismay. Her scenes were recorded separately from the rest of the episodes. The plan was for Nichols to tape scenes from time to time set in Australia where she would phone Alf or Rita in short segments, but only one episode featured such a scene and the idea was dropped due to Nichols' poor health.

Patricia Hayes, who had been seen from time to time previously as next-door neighbour Min, became a starring character along with her husband Bert, previously played by Bill Maynard and now by Alfie Bass. The show's ratings began to suffer and when it was clear Nichols was not returning as hoped by the writer, in 1975, the series was cancelled. The final episode saw Alf lose his job and receive a telegram from Else asking for a divorce.

== Production ==
As with most BBC sitcoms Till Death Us Do Part was recorded before a live studio audience. The programmes were recorded onto two-inch quadruplex videotape. From 1966 to 1968, the show was transmitted in black and white. When the series returned in 1972, it was transmitted in colour. The opening titles/end credits of the first colour episodes originally used the black-and-white sequence from the 1960s tinted in red, as seen on UKTV Gold repeats in 2006.

The house seen in the opening and closing titles to the 1960s episodes was located on Garnet Street in Wapping (from where writer Johnny Speight took the Garnett family name). This terrace was demolished in June 1968 for road widening (which is why the street used in the 1969 film and the opening titles to the colour episodes do not match with the houses used in the original opening sequence). Subsequent to this, in the 1980s, a terrace of newer multicoloured homes and an estate agents took the places of the terraced estate. They are located on Garnet Street.

== Missing black and white episodes ==
Some of the show's 26 episodes from series 1–3 that were videotaped in black and white and broadcast between 1965 and 1968 no longer exist; they were wiped by the BBC during the late 1960s and early 1970s. Currently, most material from thirteen episodes still survives, with one episode on the original tape and the rest on film or domestic formats. The surviving 1960s B&W episodes are: "Arguments, Arguments"; "A House With Love in It"; "Intolerance"; "Peace & Goodwill"; "Sex Before Marriage"; "In Sickness and in Health"; "State Visit"; "Alf's Dilemma"; "Till Closing Time Do Us Part"; "The Phone"; "The Blood Donor"; "Monopoly" and "Aunt Maud". Sequences exist from: the pilot episode; "The Bulldog Breed"; "A Wapping Mythology (The Workers' King)"; and "The Puppy".

The public appeal campaign, the BBC Archive Treasure Hunt, continues to search for lost episodes. In 1997, the long-lost episode "Alf's Dilemma" was found in a private collection on a 21-minute 16mm telerecording. This is the episode featuring Garnett reading Mary Whitehouse's first book. The episode was rebroadcast in 1998 on UK Gold.

In 2001, two episodes from Series 3 were recovered, "The Phone" and "Aunt Maud". Both were taken from off air recordings on a Philips EL3400 open reel videotape by Martin Loach, the latter episode was missing the first two minutes.

In August 2009, two more black and white episodes, "In Sickness and in Health" and "State Visit", were returned by a film collector.

The episode "Intolerance" was recovered in August 2016. It was screened at the BFI's annual "Missing Believed Wiped" event on Saturday 16 December 2016 at their Southbank venue. Network's late 2016 complete DVD box set contains off-air audio recordings of what was then every missing episode. In autumn 2017, a copy of "Sex Before Marriage" was recovered.

Till Death Us Do Part started airing on That's TV on 4 September 2022, as part of a nightly BBC sitcom double bill with The Fall and Rise of Reginald Perrin, with four 'lost episodes' ("Intolerance", "In Sickness and In Health", "State Visit" and "The Phone") included as part of the run by the channel.

In October 2023, Kaleidoscope announced the discovery of the previously lost episode "Monopoly" which was recorded on a domestic 405 line reel to reel tape format, which was donated to the organisation by a member of the cast in 2018. Two further copies of previously recovered episodes were also discovered, including another copy of the episode "The Phone" and a complete copy of "Aunt Maud" which previously existed incomplete.

== Differences with All in the Family ==
In contrast with their American counterparts Archie and Edith Bunker, Alf and Else Garnett had a more dysfunctional marriage which involved both constantly hurling insults at each other. Unlike Edith, who usually did not react to Archie whenever he insulted her by calling her "dingbat", Else was less happy with her marriage and would call her husband "pig" after he called her "silly moo". Unlike Else, Edith would refrain from sharing her husband's prejudices. Though both the Garnett and Bunker households were intended to represent working class life, Archie Bunker's house was one of more private, cozier quality. In contrast to the Bunker household, Alf Garnett's family lived in a very modest house which, at least in the series' early seasons, had only one lavatory (and that outdoors), and no telephone. Unlike the less prosperous Garnett household, the socio-economic status of the Bunker household was considered to be lower-middle class. Like Alf Garnett, Archie Bunker was both conservative-minded and bigoted. However, Alf's attitude and language was more violent. Unlike the more abrasive Alf Garnett, Archie Bunker was regarded as a tamer, watered-down version of his British counterpart, and was even considered a protagonist.

== Controversy ==
Although Speight said he wrote the series to challenge racism, some critics believed that many people watched it because they agreed with Garnett's views. Anthony Clark of Screenonline stated, "Sadly, Speight's defence was far from watertight—having a white actor, Spike Milligan, black up and don a turban in one episode is clearly questionable", and added that "In Till Death Us Do Part, Alf's lengthy rants go largely unchallenged; his wife does little more than raise an eyebrow, while the responses from daughter Rita and the wholly unsympathetic Mike are often little more than impotent quips or frustrated laughter." John Cleese, who was himself accused of making racist remarks, defended the series in 2020, saying "We laughed at Alf's reactionary views. Thus, we discredited them, by laughing at him. Of course, there were people—very stupid people—who said, 'Thank God someone is saying these things at last'. We laughed at these people too."

The linguist Alan Crosby has argued that the constant use of the phrase "Scouse git" with reference to Anthony Booth's character spread both the word "Scouse" and negative stereotypes of Liverpudlians.

== Sequels ==
In 1980, the ITV company ATV picked up the series and produced a solo show starring Alf, titled The Thoughts of Chairman Alf at Christmas, transmitted on 26 December. The master copy has been wiped, but a home video recording is currently available to view at the National Media Museum in Bradford.

In 1981, ATV made six episodes under the title Till Death.... The series had Alf and Else sharing a bungalow with Min (Patricia Hayes) in Eastbourne following the death of her husband Bert (Alfie Bass). Although Rita remained in the cast, Anthony Booth declined to return. Rita's son Michael was now a teenager and a punk rocker (even though he was born in 1972 and therefore should only have been about nine). The series was not a success and when ATV was restructured as Central Television in 1982, Till Death... was not recommissioned.

Alf Garnett returned to the BBC in 1985 for In Sickness and in Health. This took Alf and Else, who was now in a wheelchair, onward into old age, and some of Alf's more extreme opinions were shown to have mellowed. Una Stubbs made some guest appearances, but Anthony Booth was not interested in reprising his role. Eventually, Mike and Rita divorced, and Rita began dating a doctor. After the first series, Dandy Nichols died, and subsequent episodes showed Alf having to deal with life as a widower.

The loss of Else (and later, Rita) as regulars in the cast meant that new characters had to be brought in as antagonists for Alf. These notably included his home help, Winston (played by Eamonn Walker), who was both black and gay, and Alf's prim upstairs neighbour, Mrs. Hollingbery (played by Carmel McSharry), who eventually agreed to marry Alf.

In 1988, Speight was warned about the use of racist language; after discussion, it was decided that Alf's racist language was to be discontinued and the character of Winston was to be written out. With such improvements helping to update the basic concept, In Sickness and in Health ran until 1992.

Warren Mitchell also appeared solo on stage and TV as Alf Garnett, dispensing variations on Alf's homespun reactionary philosophy and singing old music hall songs, most notably in the London Weekend Television show An Audience with Alf Garnett.

After Johnny Speight's death in July 1998, Mitchell decided to retire the character of Alf Garnett.

== Cast ==
- Warren Mitchell as Alf Garnett
- Dandy Nichols as Else Garnett
- Una Stubbs as Rita Rawlins, née Garnett
- Anthony Booth as Mike Rawlins
- Joan Sims as Gran
- Patricia Hayes as Min Reed
- Alfie Bass as Bert Reed
- Hugh Lloyd as Wally Carey
- Pat Coombs as Mrs. Carey
- Will Stampe as Fred the barman

In the Comedy Playhouse pilot, Alf's family name was Ramsey, but the BBC changed his name to Garnett for the subsequent series, to avoid confusion with the England football manager at the time.

== Film adaptations ==
Two feature films were made based on the series – the first was Till Death Us Do Part (1969), whose first half dealt with the younger Alf and Else during World War II, and whose second half dealt with all the Garnetts in the present day being moved from their East End slum to the new town of Hemel Hempstead, and the adjustments and changes that brought on the family. It gave a nuanced glimpse of British life at the time. The second film, The Alf Garnett Saga (1972), had Adrienne Posta playing the part of Rita and Paul Angelis playing Mike. It is notable for featuring Alf Garnett on an LSD trip.

== DVD releases ==
In the UK, Network previously released the first two colour series (4 and 5) on DVD, but these releases are now discontinued, as the licence has since expired, and rights have reverted to BBC Worldwide, who release their titles through 2 Entertain. On 5 December 2016, Network, under licence with BBC Worldwide and 2 Entertain, released the whole colour series (4 to 7), along with every surviving episode from the black-&-white series (1 to 3) and off-air remastered audio recordings of all lost episodes, on DVD as an eight-disc box-set included with a detailed booklet which includes black-and-white and colour photographs, a "story of" and a full list of episode synopses. The episode Sex Before Marriage, recovered in 2017, was included as an extra on Network's 2019 release of the film on both DVD and Blu-Ray.

The fourth series was available in the United States and Canada, having been released before the Network edition and featuring some title sequence variations. The 1969 movie is available in both the UK and the US, but the 1972 movie is only available on DVD via bootlegs.

All six series and the Christmas specials of In Sickness and in Health have been released on DVD by 2 Entertain.

== See also ==
- British sitcom
- List of films based on British sitcoms
- Kingswood Country, an Australian comedy with a similarly intolerant protagonist.
