= Patricia Hayes =

British actress (1909–1998)

Patricia Hayes OBE
- Born: Patricia Lawlor Hayes; 22 December 1909; Streatham, London, England
- Died: 19 September 1998 (aged 88); Puttenham, Surrey, England
- Resting place: Watts Cemetery Chapel, Compton, Surrey, England
- Occupation: Actress
- Years active: 1936–1996
- Spouse: Valentine Brooke (m. 1939; div. 1951)
- Children: 3, including Richard O'Callaghan

Patricia Lawlor Hayes (22 December 1909 – 19 September 1998) was an English character actress. She is best known for playing the titular Edna in the Play for Today, Edna, the Inebriate Woman (1971), for which she won the British Academy Television Award for Best Actress.

== Early life ==
Patricia Lawlor Hayes was born in Streatham, London, the daughter of George Frederick Hayes and Florence Alice Hayes. Her father was a clerk in the civil service and her mother was a schoolmistress. As a child, Hayes attended the Sacred Heart High School, Hammersmith.

== Career ==
Hayes attended RADA, graduating in 1928. She spent the next 10 years in repertory theatre.

She was featured in many radio and television comedy shows between 1940 and 1996, including Hancock's Half Hour, Ray's a Laugh, The Arthur Askey Show, The Benny Hill Show, Bootsie and Snudge, Hugh and I and Till Death Us Do Part. She played the part of Henry Bones in the BBC Children's Hour radio programme Norman and Henry Bones, the Boy Detectives from 1943 to 1965.

Hayes was cast in supporting roles for films including The Bargee (1964), The NeverEnding Story (1984), A Fish Called Wanda (1988) and was also featured as Fin Raziel in the Ron Howard film Willow (1988).

Her most substantial television appearance was in the title role of Edna, the Inebriate Woman (Play for Today, 1971) for which she won a BAFTA award. She provided the character voice for comedy puppet performances for television programmes such as Gran (Woodland Animations, 1982).

In April 1975, Hayes was interviewed by Roy Plomley for Desert Island Discs. A sizeable, but incomplete, extract is available to listen to and download via the programme's website on the BBC.

In 1977, she appeared on the BBC's long running TV variety show The Good Old Days; she had been an early member of the Players' Theatre in London, an old time music hall club, from the 1950s onwards.

In 1978, Hayes was nominated for the Laurence Olivier Award for Best Actress in a Supporting Role for playing Rosalina in Filumena at The National Theatre.

In 1985, she starred in the title role of the TV play Mrs Capper's Birthday by Noël Coward.

In 1989, she appeared with her son Richard O'Callaghan in the Boon episode "The Rise of Fall of the Bowman Empire", in which they played mother and son, Elsepth and Cecil Bowman respectively.

Hayes played Miss. Willow, in one episode of the 1991 radio show The Secret Life of Rosewood Avenue.

== Personal life ==
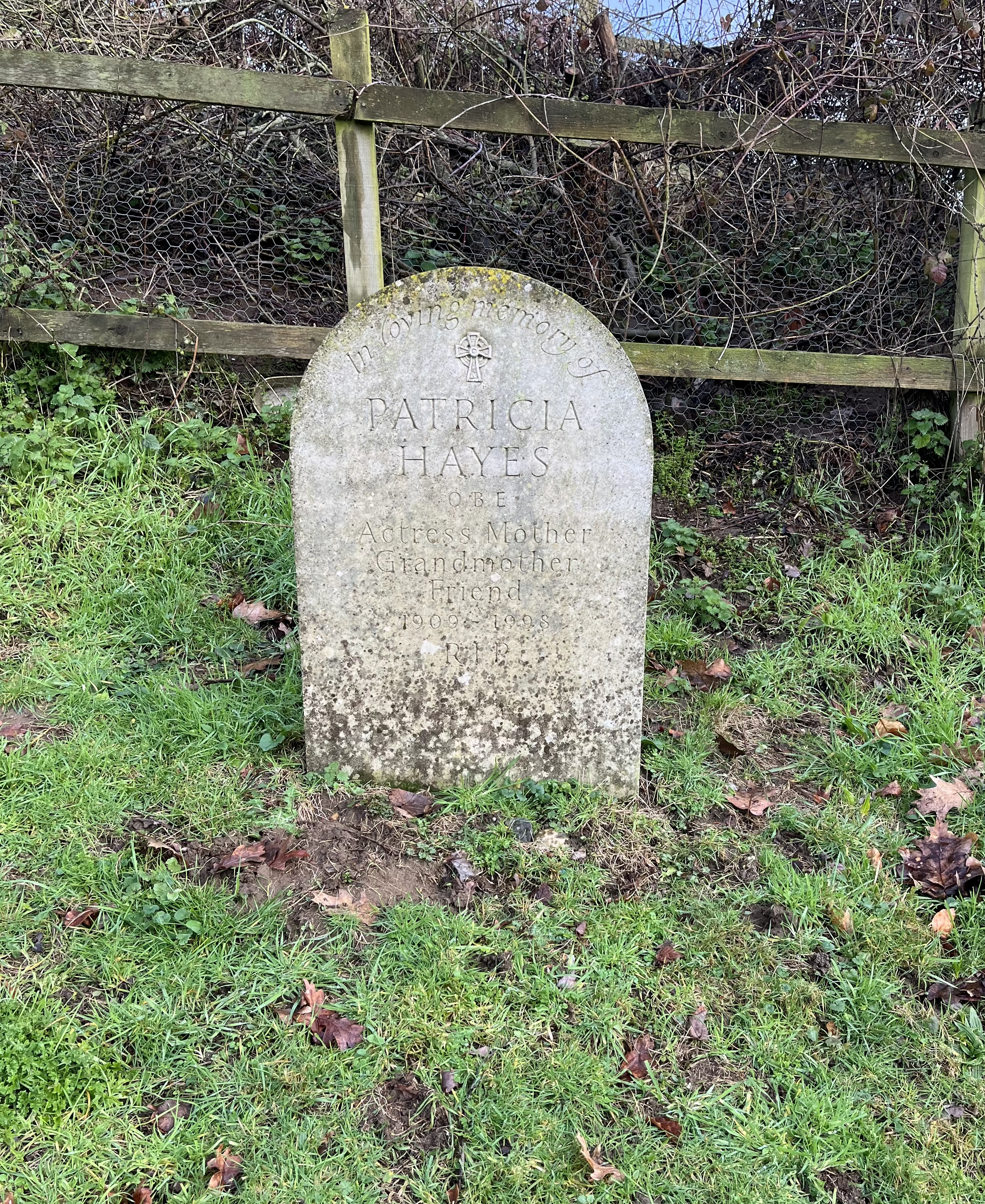
The grave of Patricia Hayes at the Watts Cemetery Chapel in 2026

She was the mother of British actor Richard O'Callaghan (born Richard Brooke) by her marriage to Valentine Brooke, whom she divorced. She also had a daughter, Gemma Brooke, born in 1948. She never remarried. She was formerly the head of the British Catholic Stage Guild, which her son later chaired.

She was awarded an OBE in 1987.

== Death ==
Patricia Hayes died in September 1998 in Puttenham, Surrey. She appeared posthumously in the 2002 film Crime and Punishment which had been filmed in 1993, but delayed because of a legal case. She is buried at the Watts Cemetery Chapel, Compton, Surrey.

== Television roles ==
Year	Title	Role	Notes
1938	When We Are Married	Ruby Birtle	
1957 to March 14, 1979	The Benny Hill Show	Various	(TV series)
1957 to 1958	Educated Evans	Emma Troggs	9 episodes
1958 to 1960	Hancock's Half Hour	Mrs. Cravatte/ Aunt Edie/ 3rd Old Woman	7 episodes
1959	The Four Just Men	Miss Lee	"National Treasure" (ep 1.13)
1960 to 1963	Bootsie and Snudge	Various	5 episodes
1962 to 1966	Hugh and I	Griselda Wormold	
1962 to 1966	The Arthur Haynes Show	Various	21 episodes
1962 to 1967	The Ken Dodd Show	Various	6 episodes
1963	Maigret	Didine Gulot	"The Judge's House" (ep 4.9)
1963	Boyd Q.C.	Miss Twiss	"End of Term" (ep 6.11)
1967 to 1969	The Very Merry Widow	Katie	
1967 to 1975	Till Death Us Do Part	Mrs. Carey/ Min Reed	14 episodes
1968	Misleading Cases	Mrs Jackson	"Ill Met by Sunlight" (ep 2.5)
1968 to 1969	According To Dora	Various	3 episodes
1968 to 1969	The World of Beachcomber	Various	10 episodes
1969	The Galton and Simpson Comedy	Joyce	"Friends in High Places"
1970	Catweazle	Mrs. Skinner	"The Wisdom of Solomon" (ep 1.12)
1971	Grasshopper Island	Lupus	9 episodes
1971	Edna, the Inebriate Woman	Edna	Play for Today (ep 2.2)
1971	The Trouble With Lilian	Lilian	6 episodes
1971 to 1972	The Last of the Baskets	Mrs Basket	13 episodes
1972	The Goodies	Hazel, or "Hecate, Queen of Necromancy"	"That Old Black Magic" (ep 3.4)
1974	Holiday With Strings	Air Hostess	TV movie
1975	Softly, Softly: Task Force	Anne Hobbes	"Female of the Species" (ep 7.8)
1977	London Belongs To Me	Connie Coke	7 episodes
1977	Galton and Simpson Playhouse	Granny	"I Tell You It's Burt Reynolds"
1979 to 1982	Spooner's Patch	Old Lady/ Mrs Cantaford	14 episodes
1980	Juliet Bravo	Doris Latham	"Fraudently Uttered" (ep 1.2)
1981	Till Death...	Min Reed	6 episodes
1983	The Witches and the Grinnygog	Miss Bendybones	4 episodes
1983	Gran	Gran, Narrator	13 episodes
1983 to 1984	The Lady Is a Tramp	Old Pat	13 episodes
1984	Hammer House of Mystery and Suspense	Gran Waters	"And the Walls Came Tumbling Down"
1985	Marjorie and Men	Alice Tripp	6 episodes
1986 to 1992	In Sickness and in Health	Min Reed	3 episodes
1989	Boon	Elsepth Bowman	"The Rise and Fall of the Bowman Empire" (ep 3.12)
1989	Casualty	Mrs. Calthorn	"Banking for Beginners" (ep 4.11)
1990	The Bill	Mrs. Croft	"Decisions" (ep 6.93)
1993	Lovejoy	Lady Alfreston	"A Growing Concern" (ep 5.3)
1994	Murder Most Horrid	Mrs. Templecombe	"Mangez Merveillac" (ep 2.5)
1994	The Ruth Rendell Mysteries	Grannie Nauls	"The Master of the Moors" (2 parts)
1994	Woof!	Great Aunt Sarah	"High Temperatures" (ep 7.8)
1995	Heartbeat	Flo	"Expectations" (ep 5.2)
1995	The Tomorrow People	Felicity Triplett	5 episodes

== Selected filmography ==
- Broken Blossoms (1936) – Minor role (uncredited)
- Went the Day Well? (1942) – Daisy
- When We Are Married (1943) – Ruby Birtle
- The Dummy Talks (1943) – (uncredited)
- Hotel Reserve (1944) – Woman
- Candles at Nine (1944) – Gewndolyn – Maid
- Great Day (1945) – Mrs. Beadle
- The Life and Adventures of Nicholas Nickleby (1947) – Phoebe
- To the Public Danger (1948) – Postmistress
- Poet's Pub (1949) – Mrs. Lott (uncredited)
- La Rosa di Bagdad (1949) – Amin (English version, voice)
- Skimpy in the Navy (1949) – (uncredited)
- The Enforcer (1951) – Teenager (uncredited)
- The Love Match (1955) – Emma Binns
- The Battle of the Sexes (1960) – Jeannie Macdougall
- Reach for Glory (1962) – Mrs. Freeman
- Kill or Cure (1962) – Lily – Waitress
- The Sicilians (1963) – Plane passenger
- It's All Over Town (1964) – Charlady
- Saturday Night Out (1964) – Edie's Mother
- The Bargee (1964) – Onlooker (uncredited)
- A Ghost of a Chance (1967, Children's Film Foundation) – Miss Woollie
- The Terrornauts (1967) – Mrs. Jones
- Can Heironymus Merkin Ever Forget Mercy Humppe and Find True Happiness? (1969) – Grandma
- Goodbye, Mr. Chips (1969) – Miss Honeybun (uncredited)
- Carry On Again Doctor (1969) – Mrs. Beasley
- Fragment of Fear (1970) – Mrs. Baird
- Raising the Roof (1972) – Aunt Maud
- Super Bitch (1973) – Mamma the Turk
- Love Thy Neighbour (1973) – Annie Booth
- The Best of Benny Hill (1974) – Interviewer ('Words of Comfort') / Marie Quaint
- Danger on Dartmoor (1980) – Mrs. Green
- Cymbeline (1982) – Soothsayer
- The NeverEnding Story (1984) – Urgl
- Little Dorrit (1987) – Affery
- Willow (1988) – Fin Raziel
- A Fish Called Wanda (1988) – Mrs. Coady
- War Requiem (1989) – Mother
- The Fool (1990) – The Dowager
- The House of Bernarda Alba (1991) – Maria Josefa
- Blue Ice (1992) – Old Woman
- The Steal (1995) – Mrs. Fawkes
- Crime and Punishment (2002) – Alyonna Ivanovna, old pawnbroker (final film role; released posthumously)
