= Carmel McSharry =

Irish actress (1926–2018)

- Born: 18 August 1926; Dublin, Ireland
- Died: 4 March 2018 (aged 91); Chiswick, London, England
- Education: RADA
- Occupation: Actress
- Years active: 1947–1997

Carmel Evelyn McSharry (18 August 1926 – 4 March 2018) was an Irish character actress, best known for her roles as Beryl Humphries in Beryl's Lot (1973–77), and as Mrs. Hollingbery in In Sickness and in Health.

== Early life ==
Carmel McSharry's parents, John McSharry and Christina Harvey were Irish. Her mother travelled back to Dublin for the birth of Carmel so that she would be born in Ireland.

== Career ==
McSharry was chiefly known for her roles as Beryl Humphries in Beryl's Lot (1973–77), and as Mrs. Hollingbery in In Sickness and in Health. She also played bit parts in The Day the Earth Caught Fire (1961), 80,000 Suspects (1963) and The Leather Boys (1964).

Her television work included roles in The Liver Birds, Casualty and Z-Cars. She also appeared in the BBC play Home from Home in 1973, which also featured Yootha Joyce and Michael Robbins.

== Personal life ==
McSharry married Derek Briggs in 1949. They had three children, Desna, Theresa (the actress Tessa Bell Briggs) and Sean. The marriage ended in divorce.

== Retirement and death ==
McSharry retired in 1997. She died on 4 March 2018 in London, aged 91.

== Selected TV and filmography ==
- Life in Danger (1959) as Mrs. Ashley
- Oliver Twist as Nancy (10 episodes, 1962)
- 80,000 Suspects (1963) as Cleaner
- The Leather Boys (1964) as Bus conductor
- The Witches (1966) as Mrs. Dowsett
- The Man Outside (1967) as Olga
- Beryl's Lot as Beryl Humphries (52 episodes, 1973–1977)
- Little Lord Fauntleroy (1980) as Mary
- The Liver Birds as Mrs. Boswell/Hennessey (8 episodes, 1975–78, 1996)
- Bluebell as Aunt Mary (6 episodes, 1986)
- The Ruth Rendell Mysteries as Ruby Branch (4 episodes, 1987)
- Wish Me Luck as Annette (4 episodes, 1989)
- In Sickness and in Health as Mrs. Hollingbery (27 episodes, 1985–1992)
- Goodnight Sweetheart as Phoebe's grandmother (1 episode, 1997: "The Leaving of Liverpool")
