= Dandy Nichols =

British actress (1907–1986)

- Born: Daisy Sander; 21 May 1907; Fulham, London, England
- Died: 6 February 1986 (aged 78); Whitechapel, London, England
- Occupation: Actress
- Years active: 1947–1985
- Spouse: Stephen Bagueley Waters (m. 1942; div. 1955)

Dandy Nichols (born Daisy Sander; 21 May 1907 – 6 February 1986) was an English actress best known for her role as Else Garnett, the long-suffering wife of the character Alf Garnett, in the BBC sitcom Till Death Us Do Part.

== Early life and career ==
Born Daisy Sander in Fulham, London, she started her working life as a secretary in a London factory. Twelve years later, after drama, diction and fencing classes, she was spotted in a charity show by a producer, who offered her a job in his repertory theatre company in Cambridge. During her early career on stage she acted under the name Barbara Nichols but later changed it to Dandy, her childhood nickname.

When the Second World War broke out, Nichols returned to office work but later undertook a six-week tour with ENSA. When the war was over, she returned to the theatre and also began appearing in films: usually comedies and almost invariably as a maid or charlady. The latter role she took on in the music video "Goody Two Shoes" by Adam Ant.

Nichols's successes in theatre include the Royal Court Theatre and Broadway productions of Home. Her big screen debut was in Hue and Cry, in 1947, followed with performances in Nicholas Nickleby, The Fallen Idol, The Winslow Boy, The History of Mr Polly, Scott of the Antarctic, Mother Riley Meets the Vampire and Dickens' The Pickwick Papers.

== Till Death Us Do Part ==
Dandy Nichols's best-known role was Else Garnett in the landmark series Till Death Us Do Part, where she played the long-suffering wife of the character Alf Garnett who was a parody of a working class Tory. The part was originally played in the pilot episode for the series (as part of the BBC's Comedy Playhouse) by future EastEnders actress Gretchen Franklin. However, when it was commissioned as a series, Franklin was unable to break her contract for a West End play and Nichols was cast.

Nichols's role seemed, at first, almost negligible: spending the best part of one early episode reading the telephone book as Alf embarked on another of his tirades. However, Else proved to be a perfect foil for Alf, and could put him down effortlessly with a withering look or cutting remark. Perhaps her finest hour – in an episode shown by the BBC in tribute to Dandy in 1986 – was when, in 1974, Else took a leaf out of Prime Minister Edward Heath's book and went on a "three-day week", forcing Alf to fend for and feed himself on her days off.

In the original scripts, Alf was to refer to his wife as a "silly cow". This was firmly vetoed by BBC Head of Comedy Frank Muir, who thought this was inappropriate. Nichols said that it was "a lot of silly fuss about a silly moo" which was overheard by script writer Johnny Speight and became the series' most enduring catchphrase.

== In Sickness and in Health ==
Till Death Us Do Part came to an end in 1975 but was revived in 1981, entitled Till Death..., and again in 1985. Nichols agreed to appear, but had been suffering from rheumatoid arthritis and had to use a wheelchair. Her illnesses were written into the scripts, and the series was renamed In Sickness and in Health. The series continued after her death, with Alf left on his own.

== Film career ==
Nichols appeared in numerous films, which included Carry On Doctor, Ladies Who Do, The Holly and the Ivy, The Vikings, the Beatles' film Help!, Georgy Girl, Doctor in Clover, The Birthday Party, The Bed Sitting Room, O Lucky Man!, Confessions of a Window Cleaner and Britannia Hospital amongst others.

== Later years ==
After her role in Till Death Do Us Part, Nichols found work in television, notably playing opposite Alastair Sim in William Trevor's production of The Generals Day. She made appearances in Flint, The Tea Ladies and Bergerac. On stage, she appeared in Ben Travers's comedy Plunder, as well as playing alongside Sir Ralph Richardson and Sir John Gielgud in David Storey's Home, in both London and on Broadway.

== Personal life ==
Nichols was married to the newspaper editor Stephen Bagueley Waters in 1942, but the marriage ended in divorce in 1955.

Nichols's poor health led to a fall in her flat and she died three days later of pneumonia and heart disease on 6 February 1986 aged 78 at the London Hospital, Whitechapel.

== Television roles ==
Year	Title	Role	Notes
1966 to 1975; 1981; 1985	Till Death Us Do Part; Till Death... In Sickness and in Health	Else Garnett	
1971	The Trouble With You, Lilian	Madge	
1981	The Bagthorpe Saga	Mrs Forsdyke	
1983	Bergerac	Mrs Honeyman	Episode: A Message for the Rich

== Partial filmography ==
- Hue and Cry (1947) - Bit Part (uncredited)
- The Life and Adventures of Nicholas Nickleby (1947) - Mantalini's Employee (uncredited)
- The Winslow Boy (1948) - Miss Hawkins (uncredited)
- The Fallen Idol (1948) - Mrs. Patterson
- Woman Hater (1948) - Mrs. Burrell
- Here Come the Huggetts (1948) - Aunt Edie Hopkins
- Scott of the Antarctic (1948) - Caroline
- The History of Mr. Polly (1949) - Mrs. Johnson
- Now Barabbas (1949) - Bit Part
- Don't Ever Leave Me (1949) - Mrs. Marshall
- Your Witness (1950) - Waitress
- Tony Draws a Horse (1950) - Mrs. Smith
- Dance Hall (1950) - Mrs. Crabtree
- The Clouded Yellow (1950) - Ernie's Mother on Train (uncredited)
- White Corridors (1951) - Char
- High Treason (1951) - Woman Scrubbing Porch Step (uncredited)
- Women of Twilight (1952) - Third Landlady (uncredited)
- The Happy Family (1952) - Ada
- Emergency Call (1952) - Barmaid
- Mother Riley Meets the Vampire (1952) - Mrs. Mott
- The Pickwick Papers (1952) - Lady at Ball (uncredited)
- The Holly and the Ivy (1952) - Neighbour
- Street Corner (1953) - Mrs. Furness - Neighbour (uncredited)
- Meet Mr Lucifer (1953) - Mrs. Clarke
- The Wedding of Lilli Marlene (1953) - Mrs. Harris (uncredited)
- Adventure in the Hopfields (1954) - Mrs. Harris
- Time Is My Enemy (1954) - Mrs. Budd - Charwoman
- The Crowded Day (1954) - Charwoman
- Mad About Men (1954) - Nurse Carey's Landlady (uncredited)
- The Glass Cage (1955) - Woman with Child (uncredited)
- Where There's a Will (1955) - Maud Hodge
- The Deep Blue Sea (1955) - Mrs. Elton
- A Time to Kill (1955) - Waitress (uncredited)
- Lost (1956) - Mrs. Gamble (uncredited)
- Not So Dusty (1956) - Mrs. Clark (Nobby's wife)
- The Feminine Touch (1956) - The Ward Maid
- Yield to the Night (1956) - Mrs. Price
- Tiger in the Smoke (1956) - Stall Attendant (uncredited)
- Town on Trial (1957) - Mrs. Wilson (uncredited)
- Doctor at Large (1957) - Lady in Outpatients Dept.
- Carry On Sergeant (1958) - (uncredited)
- The Strange World of Planet X (1958) - Mrs. Tucker
- The Vikings (1958) - Bridget
- A Cry from the Streets (1958) - Mrs. Jenks (uncredited)
- Crooks Anonymous (1962) - Mrs. Cundall
- Don't Talk to Strange Men (1962) - Molly
- Ladies Who Do (1963) - Mrs. Merryweather
- Act of Murder (1964) - Maud Peterson
- The Leather Boys (1964) - Mrs. Stanley
- The Knack ...and How to Get It (1965) - Tom's Landlady, and off-screen voice
- The Amorous Adventures of Moll Flanders (1965) - Orphanage Superintendent
- Rotten to the Core (1965) - Woman in Cemetery (uncredited)
- Help! (1965) - Neighbour,(uncredited)
- The Early Bird (1965) - Woman Flooded by Milk
- Doctor in Clover (1966) - Patient with Kidney Stones
- Georgy Girl (1966) - Hospital Nurse
- How I Won the War (1967) - First Old Lady
- Carry On Doctor (1967) - Mrs. Roper
- The Birthday Party (1968) - Meg Bowles
- Till Death Us Do Part (1969) - Else Garnett
- The Bed Sitting Room (1969) - Mrs Ethel Shroake
- First Love (1970) - Princess Zasekina
- The Alf Garnett Saga (1972) - Else Garnett
- O Lucky Man! (1973) - Tea Lady / Neighbour
- Confessions of a Window Cleaner (1974) - Mrs. Lea
- Three for All (1975) - Henrietta
- Britannia Hospital (1982) - Florrie
- The Plague Dogs (1982) - Phyllis (voice)
- Goody Two Shoes (Adam Ant music video) (1982) - Cleaning lady
