= Johnny Speight =

English television writer (1920–1998)

- Cropped still by Lewis Morley, 1962
- Born: 2 June 1920; Canning Town, London, England
- Died: 5 July 1998 (aged 78); Chorleywood, Hertfordshire, England
- Occupations: Radio scriptwriter, TV screenwriter
- Spouse: Connie Barrett (m. 1956)
- Children: 3
- Writing career
- Period: 1955–98
- Genre: Television
- Notable works: Till Death Us Do Part (1965–75); Curry & Chips (1969); In Sickness and in Health (1985–92)

Johnny Speight (2 June 1920 – 5 July 1998) was an English television scriptwriter of many classic British sitcoms.

Speight emerged in the mid-1950s, writing for radio comics Frankie Howerd, Vic Oliver, Arthur Askey, and Cyril Fletcher. For television he wrote for Morecambe & Wise, Peter Sellers and The Arthur Haynes Show. Later, he began to write Till Death Us Do Part, which included his most famous creation, the controversial bigot Alf Garnett. His shows often explored the themes of racism and sexism through satire.

== Life and career ==
John Speight was born into an Irish Catholic family in Canning Town, West Ham, Essex (now Greater London). He left school at 14, and after a series of odd jobs, tried his hand at writing, looking to George Bernard Shaw as inspiration. He began contributing scripts to comedy shows in 1955, starting with Great Scott - It's Maynard!. He later contributed to Sykes and a... (1960–65), which starred Eric Sykes, Hattie Jacques and Richard Wattis. Speight was one of many writers on that series which also included Sykes, John Antrobus and Spike Milligan. He created the iconic working class tramp figure played by Arthur Haynes in the latter's long-running and top-rating ATV comedy series. Haynes died in 1966.

In 1965, Speight wrote a BBC TV pilot which became the 1966 series Till Death Us Do Part featuring Warren Mitchell as Alf Garnett, a reactionary Conservative-voting working-class man with a chip on his shoulder and an angry word on everything. Garnett became one of the most memorable characters in British TV history. The 1971 US sitcom All in the Family was based on this series. In 1965, Speight did uncredited screenplay work for the film You Must be Joking!. Speight also played Barmey Harry in the second film spin-off, The Alf Garnett Saga, in 1972.

Speight's later series Curry and Chips (1969) was a more controversial sitcom from LWT for the ITV channel, soon cancelled on the instructions of the Independent Broadcasting Authority on racial grounds. His next comedy was For Richer...For Poorer (1975), a one-off pilot which featured Harry H. Corbett as a left-wing answer to Alf Garnett. After a brief return of Till Death Us Do Part on ITV in 1981 as Till Death..., Alf Garnett returned on the BBC's In Sickness and in Health which ran from 1985 to 1992. In 1985, he wrote the unbroadcast pilot "Jewel in the Crown" starring Spike Milligan and Eric Sykes, with Milligan wearing blackface and making racially charged jokes, while adopting a Pakistani accent.

In 1988 Speight wrote a set of special short sketches for inclusion in London's Museum of the Moving Image (MOMI) in a feature called "Ask Alf". Using random access video visitors were invited to ask Alf Garnett his thoughts on a variety of subjects including museums. Warren Mitchell recorded the short sketches free of charge for MOMI while on tour in Australia.

Speight's work brought him financial success, but despite driving a Rolls-Royce he remained a life-long socialist.

He was a subject of the television programme This Is Your Life in May 1970 when he was surprised by Eamonn Andrews.

== Death ==
In 1998, Speight died of pancreatic cancer, aged 78 at his home in Chorleywood. LWT put forward a series of specials featuring Warren Mitchell as Alf Garnett, giving his thoughts on a variety of subjects. The programmes were originally shelved by ITV controller David Liddiment.

== TV writing credits ==
- Great Scott – It's Maynard! (1955)
- Evans Abode (1956)
- Frankie Howerd (1956)
- The Dickie Valentine Show (1956)
- Two's Company (1956)
- Early to Braden (1957)
- That's Life, Says Max Wall (1957)
- The Arthur Haynes Show (1957)
- Frankie Howerd In... (1958)
- The Show of 8 April (Seven Days Early) (1958)
- The Cyril Fletcher Show (1959)
- Ladies and Gentle-Men (1960)
- Sykes and a... (1960)
- The Compartment (1961)
- That Was the Week That Was (1962)
- Shamrot (1963)
- The Graham Stark Show (1964)
- Till Death Us Do Part (1965)
- To Lucifer – A Son (1967)
- If There Weren't Any Blacks You'd Have to Invent Them (1968)
- Curry and Chips (1969)
- Spate of Speight (1969)
- All in the Family (1971)
- Them (1972)
- Ein Herz und eine Seele (1973)
- Frankie Howerd in Ulster (1973)
- Francis Howerd in Concert (1974)
- Marty Back Together Again (1974)
- For Richer...For Poorer (1975)
- The Mike Reid Show (1976)
- Spooner's Patch (with Ray Galton, 1979)
- The Tea Ladies (with Ray Galton, 1979)
- The Thoughts of Chairman Alf at Christmas (1980)
- Till Death... (1981)
- The Lady Is a Tramp (1983)
- In Sickness and in Health (1985)
- Carrott Confidential (1987)
- The Nineteenth Hole (1989)
- A Word with Alf (1997)
- An Audience with Alf Garnett (1997)
- The Thoughts of Chairman Alf (1998)
