= Alf Garnett =

- Till Death Us Do Part character
- First appearance: "Pilot" (Comedy Playhouse, 1965)
- Last appearance: The Thoughts of Chairman Alf (1998)
- Created by: Johnny Speight
- Portrayed by: Warren Mitchell

In-universe information
- Family: Charlie Garnett (father)
- Spouse: Else Garnett
- Children: Rita Rawlins
- Relatives: Michael Rawlins, Jr. (grandson)
- Nationality: British

Alfred Edward Garnett is a fictional character from the English sitcom Till Death Us Do Part and its follow-on and spin-off series Till Death... and In Sickness and in Health. He also appeared in the chat show The Thoughts of Chairman Alf. The character was created by Johnny Speight and played by Warren Mitchell.

In a 2001 poll conducted by Channel 4, Alf Garnett was ranked 49th on their list of the 100 Greatest TV Characters.

== Character ==
=== History ===
Alf Garnett was born in Wapping around 1917. Little is known of Alf's parents, but his father was sometimes mentioned negatively by Alf's wife Else, who said "nobody knew what he was – some say he was a gyppo (gypsy)." It was also hinted that Alf had Jewish ancestry, though he always denied this and often referred to his religion as Church of England, "same as Her Majesty the Queen", though he rarely attended services. He was unpopular as a youth and it was claimed he only began going out with Else, whom he had known since they were children, as a result of his mother's intervention. A two-year courtship followed during the early years of World War II and the pair married in 1941 (the film Till Death Us Do Part (1968) showed the couple marrying in 1939, but the actual series always stated them to have been married in 1941). Alf was called up for military service in 1940 but managed to avoid duty by claiming he was in a reserved occupation. In the series, however, Garnett claimed that he saw active service overseas during the war. Alf and Else had a daughter, Rita, by 1942 and raised her in the slums of Wapping at 25 Jamaica Street, where Alf worked on the docks and Else stayed at home and tended to the house.

Rita married her "long-haired layabout" socialist boyfriend Mike in 1966, shortly after the general election of 31 March, and they moved into the Garnetts' house. Alf and Mike rarely got along; the only time they saw eye to eye was when they both went to the 1966 World Cup Final. Around 1968, according to the film The Alf Garnett Saga, despite resistance from Alf, the Garnetts were rehoused in a tower block in a new town on the outskirts of London. Alf continued to work on the docks in London despite the long commute. In the TV series they remained in the East End. Else eventually left Alf in 1974 and moved to Australia to live with her sister Maud, whom Alf hated. She later wired Alf in 1975 on his birthday asking him for a divorce. The same day, Alf lost his job.

Some time between 1975 and 1981, Mike and Rita moved back to Liverpool, and Alf and Else reconciled and moved to Eastbourne with their widowed neighbour Min. Rita visited and Alf was horrified to see his grandson, now a teenager (albeit being born in 1972, his age is inconsistent between series), was a punk rocker. Between 1981 and 1985, the Garnetts moved back to a small house in the East End, and Min stayed behind with her sister Gwenyth. Else became ill and needed to use a wheelchair.

Else died in September 1986 and Alf, after years of poor treatment of his wife, was devastated by her death. He later got involved with and nearly married his upstairs neighbour, Mrs. Hollingberry. They later broke it off but remained good friends. Alf's views on race softened in his old age, and he invited Else's black home help, Winston, and then Winston's cousin Pele to be his lodgers. He was also on moderately good terms with the local Pakistani shopkeeper Mr Kittel and a Jewish neighbour, Mr Rabinsky. In 1998, Alf was still living in the East End and Mrs. Hollingberry was still his neighbour.

=== Personality ===
In the episode "State Visit" (20 February 1967) Alf gives his full name as Alfred Edward Garnett.

Alf was a working class man, forever complaining that he worked hard and yet lived near the poverty line. He was a staunch supporter of the Conservative Party but did not support one-time leader Margaret Thatcher because he believed that a woman's place was at home "chained to the bloody kitchen sink!" and blamed Thatcher's husband Denis for not telling her "to keep her place". He did not admire her predecessor, "grammar school boy" Edward Heath, either.

His biggest reason for being a Conservative was not that he admired the party, but that he fully rejected the policy of the Labour Party, believing them to pretend to represent the working classes, whilst "all they would do when in power is feather their own nests". He was also an admirer of the Queen and the royal family, decorating his home with prints of many members of the royal family, including the late Duke of Windsor, which he bought from a local junk shop. This, however, did not stop him from criticising them when he thought they deserved it. His biggest passion in life though, was his local football team West Ham United.

Generally, Alf blamed his problems on everybody but himself. His family was the usual target of his anger and frustration. In the shows, Garnett was regularly ridiculed for his illogical views and hypocrisy by his family, but he stubbornly refused to admit he was wrong. Alf also showed himself to be a coward - despite his angry diatribes about people or organisations whom he despised, he usually shirked away from any actual confrontation with such individuals if the opportunity presented itself.

Alf was mean and selfish towards his emotionally detached wife, Else played by Dandy Nichols, referring to her as a "silly old moo". Else usually turned a deaf ear to most of Alf's rantings, but if he got too personal, she would come up with a sharp retort to fight back. Her usual retort was to call him "Pig!" Though detached from him emotionally, she could easily give as good as she got.

In the sequel series In Sickness and In Health Else needed to use a wheelchair, and Alf grumbled about having to care for her. When Dandy Nichols died in 1986, the character of Else was killed off. Alf always treated his wife appallingly, but genuinely missed her after her death.

Alf was outraged when his daughter Rita, played by Una Stubbs, decided to marry Michael, her long-haired, unemployed boyfriend, played by Anthony Booth. Michael was from Liverpool and a Catholic of Irish descent, precisely the type of person Alf hated most. Alf often described him as a "Randy Scouse Git". This terminology was later picked up by the American pop group The Monkees for their song, "Randy Scouse Git", included on their 1967 album Headquarters. Alf and Michael had opposite political views and much of the programme focussed on their heated political debates.

Rita could give as good as she got as well, her catchphrase was often "You make me sick, you do!" before she would go off on her own tirades, at times aimed at her husband when they had a disagreement, but more often at her overheating father over his negative treatment of her mother or at his bigoted views.

Writer Johnny Speight often commented that the character was supposed to be a figure of ridicule, but admitted that not all viewers saw the satirical elements of the character. Speight defended the Alf Garnett character, saying: "If you do the character correctly, he just typifies what you hear – not only in pubs but in golf clubs around the country. To make him truthful he's got to say those things, and they are nasty things. But I feel as a writer that they should be out in the open so we can see how daft these comparisons are."

Mitchell left the Royal Academy of Dramatic Art with a trained actor's voice. A lifelong, committed socialist, he sold socialist newspapers on street corners, shouting his wares in his beautifully trained voice. It was only when he realised why people were not buying his newspapers that he developed Alf's voice, to appear more "working class". Mitchell stated that he became tired of always being associated with Alf Garnett but enjoyed playing the part and appreciated the debt he owed to the character.

In the late 1980s, the Museum of the Moving Image in London staged an "Alf Garnett exhibition", where visitors pressed buttons representing particular social problems and were presented with Alf giving his opinions on the subject.

The American adaptation of Till Death Do Us Part, All in the Family, featured Archie Bunker in the Alf Garnett mould. Like Garnett in British popular culture, Bunker became an icon in American popular culture for his very conservative views, although the Bunker character was portrayed as somewhat more likable than Garnett. Bunker, in turn, served as an inspiration for Eric Cartman of South Park.

The German adaptation of the show, Ein Herz und eine Seele, featured Alfred Tetzlaff in the Garnett mould, although Tetzlaff was also designed as a parody of Adolf Hitler.

In the movie Till Death Us Do Part, Alf receives a letter advising him that he has been called up for war service. However, the letter which is shown on screen is addressed to Alfred Garnet. Later in the film, Alf claims that the call-up papers were in error because he was in a Reserved Occupation and thus ineligible for service, so possibly the authorities had confused him with someone with a similar name.

In the TV series and films, Alf is always shown as a pipe smoker, usually smoking St Bruno tobacco in a Straight Billiard type pipe. The character was a staunch defender of smoking and Warren Mitchell himself received the award of Pipe Smoker of the Year in 1967 for services to pipe smoking.

== References to Alf Garnett in politics ==
The character's name has become a standard description of anyone ranting at the world in general, and has even found its way into British politics. Oswald Mosley dismissed Enoch Powell after his Rivers of Blood speech as "a middle class Alf Garnett". Former Prime Minister Harold Wilson also criticised Powell for making Alf Garnett "politically articulate" and conferring upon him "a degree of political respectability". Denis Healey accused Margaret Thatcher of possessing "the diplomacy of Alf Garnett".

More recently, Garnett has been used in criticism of politicians such as Ken Livingstone and John Reid. On 9 June 2010, during Prime Minister's Questions, David Cameron referred to Ed Balls as "the new Alf Garnett of British politics" following his comments on immigration. During the 2024 general election campaign, Reform UK leader Nigel Farage likened one of his own activists to Garnett after he was recorded calling for English Channel migrants to be used as "target practice".

== See also ==
- Archie Bunker, a character partly based on Alf Garnett
