= List of Are You Being Served? episodes =

Episodes for the British television sitcom Are You Being Served? aired from 1972 to 1985. All episodes were 30 minutes long. A film of the same name was released in 1977. While all episodes were in colour, the pilot had originally survived only in black-and-white as a film transfer from the original colour source; a restoration into colour using the chroma dots computer colour restoration technique aired 1 January 2010 on BBC Two.

== Series overview ==
Series	Episodes	Originally released	
Series	Episodes	First released	Last released
Pilot		8 September 1972	
1	5	21 March 1973	18 April 1973
2	5	14 March 1974	11 April 1974
3	9	27 February 1975	22 December 1975
4	7	8 April 1976	24 December 1976
5	7	25 February 1977	8 April 1977
Film		31 July 1977	
6	6	15 November 1978	26 December 1978
7	8	19 October 1979	26 December 1979
8	8	9 April 1981	24 December 1981
9	6	22 April 1983	27 May 1983
10	7	18 February 1985	1 April 1985
Special		28 August 2016	

== Episodes ==
=== Pilot (1972) ===
No.	Title	Directed by	Written by	Original release date
1	"Are You Being Served?"	Bernard Thompson	Jeremy Lloyd and David Croft	8 September 1972
A reorganisation at Grace Brothers department store sees the Ladies' Intimate Apparel and Gentleman's Ready-Mades departments sharing one floor. Senior assistants Mrs Slocombe and Mr Grainger clash over who gets use of the central display unit, leading them to state their case to department manager Mr Rumbold. Note: This episode was broadcast as a part of Comedy Playhouse and guest starred Michael Knowles.

=== Series 1 (1973) ===
No.	Title	Directed by	Written by	Original release date
2	"Dear Sexy Knickers..."	Bernard Thompson	Jeremy Lloyd and David Croft	21 March 1973
Gents' junior salesman Mr Lucas is eager to spend an evening after work with Ladies' junior Miss Brahms. To try to attract her he writes a note addressing her as "Sexy Knickers", but the note causes misunderstandings when it is dropped near floorwalker Captain Peacock, who hands it over to Mrs Slocombe. Guest starring Robert Raglan.
3	"Our Figures Are Slipping"	Bernard Thompson	Jeremy Lloyd and David Croft	28 March 1973
Mr Rumbold insists the floor staff stay after closing time to learn about sales technique when the sales figures for both departments keep falling.
4	"Camping In"	Bernard Thompson	Jeremy Lloyd and David Croft	4 April 1973
A transport strike in London stops the staff from getting home, so it is decided that they should sleep overnight in the store using camping equipment. Guest stars Colin Bean and Pamela Manson.
5	"His and Hers"	Bernard Thompson	Jeremy Lloyd and David Croft	11 April 1973
As part of a new promotion, an attractive saleswoman arrives to sell a unisex perfume. The staff become upset when the saleswoman undercuts their own sales with special promotional freebies for passing customers, and work together to sabotage her. Guest starring Joanna Lumley.
6	"Diamonds Are a Man's Best Friend"	Bernard Thompson	Jeremy Lloyd and David Croft	18 April 1973
A customer loses a diamond from a piece of jewellery and offers a reward for its return. The staff initially agree to split the money between them but soon turn on each other when they think they have found the diamond, although maintenance man Mr Mash dashes their hopes with his delivery of dress alterations. Guest stars Elizabeth Larner, Hilary Pritchard and Janet Davies.

=== Series 2 (1974) ===
No.	Title	Directed by	Written by	Original release date
7	"The Clock"	Harold Snoad	Jeremy Lloyd and David Croft	14 March 1974
Mr Grainger is set to celebrate his 65th birthday with a special dinner on the shop floor. However, Mr Rumbold is placed in the difficult position of handing him a cuckoo clock traditionally given to retiring staff. Guest stars Pearl Hackney and John Ringham.
8	"Cold Comfort"	Harold Snoad	Jeremy Lloyd, David Croft and Michael Knowles	21 March 1974
Due to issues securing fuel, the store's central heating is turned off despite cold weather. The staff ignore warnings not to waste electricity by using various heating appliances during opening hours, unaware that Mr Rumbold is secretly using an electric fire in his office.
9	"The Think Tank"	Harold Snoad	Jeremy Lloyd and David Croft	28 March 1974
After both departments make a total loss of £600 for the previous week a "think tank" is formed to increase sales, settling on a fashion show with the staff modelling the department's products.
10	"Big Brother"	Harold Snoad	Jeremy Lloyd, David Croft and Michael Knowles	4 April 1974
With shoplifting on the increase, Grace Brothers makes plans to trial a new CCTV system. The staff are delighted to find themselves on camera until they discover Mr Rumbold can use the system to spy on them, so they scheme to remove the CCTV altogether. Guest stars Donald Morley and Robert Raglan.
11	"Hoorah for the Holidays"	Harold Snoad	Jeremy Lloyd and David Croft	11 April 1974
Young Mr Grace wants the whole store redecorated, but needs to shut it down for two weeks for the work to be carried out. To this end, he requests the staff take their holidays during that period. The staff complain about this and the £5 "inconvenience money", until Mr Rumbold ups the offer with something less appealing. Guest starring John Clegg.

=== Series 3 (1975) ===
No.	Title	Directed by	Written by	Original release date
12	"The Hand of Fate"	David Croft	Jeremy Lloyd and David Croft	27 February 1975
Mr Humphries' skill for palm reading promises big things for Captain Peacock, especially when the staff learn that a vacancy is imminent on the board of directors. However, the predictions end up proving to be more literal than intended. Filmed: 21 February 1975
13	"Coffee Morning"	David Croft	Jeremy Lloyd and David Croft	6 March 1975
Following management concern about long-running tea breaks and visits to the lavatory, the implementation of an invasive new clocking-in book moves the staff to militant protests under the supervision of Mr Mash. Filmed: 28 February 1975
14	"Up Captain Peacock"	David Croft	Jeremy Lloyd and David Croft	13 March 1975
Captain Peacock's twentieth anniversary at Grace Brothers sees him receive access to the executives' lavatory and dining room, much to Mr Grainger's envy. The store's lunch hour has been pushed back to 2:00pm and the staff find themselves struggling to cope. Guest stars Donald Hewlett, Michael Knowles and Jeffrey Segal. Filmed: 7 March 1975
15	"Cold Store"	David Croft	Jeremy Lloyd and David Croft	20 March 1975
With assistance from Mr Mash, Mr Lucas attempts to be sent home sick by Captain Peacock in order to keep a date with a girlfriend, but finds himself working in Ladies' Intimate Apparel with a cold-stricken Mrs Slocombe after Miss Brahms refuses to work with her. Elsewhere, Mr Humphries has injured his back and Mr Grainger is suffering gastric trouble. Guest stars Ann Sidney, Pamela Cundell, Gordon Peters and Joy Allen. Filmed: 14 March 1975
16	"German Week"	David Croft	Jeremy Lloyd and David Croft	27 March 1975
The store's German Week is tainted by anti-German sentiment and a lack of interest in the German-made goods. The staff's attempts at creating a jovial Bavarian atmosphere to encourage sales are thwarted when Mrs Slocombe gets into the German wine and ruins their traditional German dance. Guest starring Joanna Lumley. Filmed: 21 March 1975
17	"Wedding Bells"	David Croft	Jeremy Lloyd and David Croft	3 April 1975
Young Mr Grace announces that he plans to remarry and asks Mrs Slocombe to see him privately, leading her colleagues to indulge her and smooth over past wrongs. Guest starring John Clegg. Filmed: 28 March 1975
18	"Shoulder to Shoulder"	Ray Butt	Jeremy Lloyd, David Croft and Michael Knowles	10 April 1975
With only the budget to redecorate one half of the floor, Mrs Slocombe and Miss Brahms find themselves relocated into the Gentleman's Ready-Mades, to the great irritation of the male staff. Guest stars Jonathan Cecil and Hilary Pritchard Filmed: 4 April 1975
19	"New Look"	Ray Butt	Jeremy Lloyd, David Croft and Michael Knowles	17 April 1975
After another dismal week's takings, the idea arises to use background music and voiceover announcements to push products. The staff welcome the idea after a cash bonus is promised to whomever is selected to be the announcer. Guest star Felix Bowness. Filmed: 11 April 1975
Special
20	"Christmas Crackers"	Ray Butt	Jeremy Lloyd and John Chapman	22 December 1975
Young Mr Grace's idea to encourage a boost in Christmas sales figures sees the department redecorated and the staff, including Captain Peacock and Mr Rumbold, dressed in novelty costumes. The department's Christmas dinner proves to be underwhelming. Note: Final appearance of Mr Mash. Filmed: 16 December 1975

=== Series 4 (1976) ===
No.	Title	Directed by	Written by	Original release date
21	"No Sale"	Ray Butt	Jeremy Lloyd and David Croft	8 April 1976
The store starts opening at 8:30am to catch customers on their way to work. While initially successful, the staff find it inconvenient and exhausting, and decide to put customers off buying in order to tank sales and end the early opens. Guest stars Gordon Peters, Anne Cunningham, Reg Dixon, Hilary Pritchard and John Bardon. Filmed: 2 April 1976
22	"Top Hat and Tails"	Ray Butt	Jeremy Lloyd and David Croft	15 April 1976
The staff are chosen to represent Grace Brothers at the Golden Shoes Competition, a nationwide department store dance contest, and Mr Humphries is ordered to instruct them. Guest starring Peter Gilmore. Note: First appearance of Mr Harman. Filmed: 9 April 1976
23	"Forward Mr Grainger"	Ray Butt	Jeremy Lloyd and David Croft	22 April 1976
Mr Grainger is promoted to department manager when Mr Rumbold goes to a seminar in Swansea, but his management style makes him very unpopular. When the seminar is cancelled and Mr Rumbold returns, Mr Grainger finds himself alienated from his colleagues. Filmed: 16 April 1976
24	"Fire Practice"	Ray Butt	Jeremy Lloyd and David Croft	29 April 1976
Young Mr Grace holds a surprise fire drill that interrupts the sale of 100 pairs of trousers to an Arabian Emir and his many wives. As a result of the poor response to the fire drill, the staff have to stay behind and practise what to do in case of a real fire. Filmed: 23 April 1976
25	"Fifty Years On"	Ray Butt	Jeremy Lloyd and David Croft	5 May 1976
After she drops some obvious hints, the staff learn of Mrs Slocombe's imminent birthday. They work out that she should be 50 and decide to go the extra mile to mark the occasion. Two new display models only work in tandem with each other. Guest stars Tony Sympson, Mavis Pugh and Diana Lambert. Filmed: 30 April 1976
26	"Oh What a Tangled Web"	Ray Butt	Jeremy Lloyd and David Croft	12 May 1976
Mrs Peacock descends on the store after learning of rumours about an affair between Captain Peacock and Miss Hazlewood, Mr Rumbold's secretary, after they grew close at the Christmas party. After Mrs Peacock attacks Mrs Slocombe and Mr Grainger is assaulted with a wedding cake, and inquiry is held in the boardroom. Guest starring Diana King. Filmed: 7 May 1976
Special
27	"The Father Christmas Affair"	Ray Butt	Jeremy Lloyd and David Croft	24 December 1976
Plans to have a mechanical Father Christmas in every department go awry, so Young Mr Grace offers a £50 bonus to anyone willing to play the part. Mr Grainger's annual performance at an old people's home, containing impressions of Winston Churchill and Stafford Cripps, gets a revamp from Mr Humphries and Mr Lucas. Filmed: 6 December 1976

=== Series 5 (1977) ===
No.	Title	Directed by	Written by	Original release date
28	"Mrs Slocombe Expects"	Ray Butt	Jeremy Lloyd and David Croft	25 February 1977
A misunderstanding sees the male staff suspecting Mrs Slocombe is pregnant by a Burmese bus conductor, but it is actually her cat Tiddles who is expecting. When Captain Peacock refuses her permission to stay home with Tiddles, Mr Harman smuggles her into the dressing room. Young Mr Grace serves on the floor to try and impart his sales wisdom. Filmed: 24 February 1977
29	"A Change Is as Good as a Rest"	Ray Butt	Jeremy Lloyd and David Croft	4 March 1977
The staff think they will all be sacked after snooping in a file when summoned to the boardoom, and Mr Grainger resigns in protest; they are actually going to be swapped to the Toys and Games Department for a week in a store-wide scheme, and they end up enjoying the change. Mr Grainger attempts to withdraw his resignation but is instead rehired as a junior salesman. Filmed: 3 March 1977
30	"Founder's Day"	Ray Butt	Jeremy Lloyd and David Croft	11 March 1977
Young Mr Grace's 80th birthday is coming and it is the department's turn to celebrate it, so they steal his memoirs to use for a This Is Your Department presentation in the boardroom. Meanwhile, Mrs Slocombe and Miss Brahms help a customer make up his mind buying a fur coat each for his wife and his mistress. Guest starring Tim Barrett. Note: Several references are made to John Inman's This Is Your Life appearance the previous year. It also marks the first appearance (via video) of Mr Humphries' mother, also played by Inman. Filmed: 10 March 1977
31	"The Old Order Changes"	Ray Butt	Jeremy Lloyd and David Croft	18 March 1977
After a visit to the USA Young Mr Grace insists on an American informality in the store, including staff wearing their own clothes and the use of Christian names, which is not welcomed by all. Guest stars Jeffrey Holland and Bernice Adams. Note: Part of Mr Lucas' costume is a Jim'll Fix It badge from a sequence where a child wished to meet the Are You Being Served? cast. Filmed: 17 March 1977
32	"Take-Over"	Ray Butt	Jeremy Lloyd and David Croft	25 March 1977
The staff learn that Grace Brothers is at risk of a takeover from unpopular Bristol firm Lally & Willets, which can only be defeated by enough votes against it at a Shareholder's Dinner. To keep their jobs they agree to attend and impersonate unavailable anti-takeover shareholders. When the catering staff are also rendered unavailable, Captain Peacock becomes commis chef under Mr Lucas as head waiter. Guest stars Donald Bisset and Mavis Pugh. Filmed: 24 March 1977
33	"Goodbye Mr Grainger"	Ray Butt	Jeremy Lloyd and David Croft	1 April 1977
Mr Grainger is having another patch of ill-temper, and his colleagues vote for him to be sacked; having sent Mr Harman to listen in, Mr Grainger decides to resign first. However, a win on the pools changes his attitude and he showers everyone in gifts as his resignation reaches Young Mr Grace. When Mr Humphries speaks to the pools firm and learns Mr Grainger has won nothing, the staff conspire to refund his expenses and retrieve his resignation so he won't be penniless. Filmed: 31 March 1977
34	"It Pays to Advertise"	Bob Spiers	Jeremy Lloyd and David Croft	8 April 1977
To reach a wider audience, Young Mr Grace commissions a cinema advert set in a cocktail bar featuring a "David Niven-ish type", using the staff as cast and crew. Life-size mannequins of Mrs Slocombe and Mr Humphries are issued across the company to represent the average man and woman. Guest starring Ferdy Mayne. Note: Last appearance of Mr Grainger in the main series; he appeared in the 1977 film and again in the 2016 special. Filmed: 7 April 1977

=== Series 6 (1978) ===
No.	Title	Directed by	Written by	Original release date
35	"By Appointment"	Bob Spiers	Jeremy Lloyd and David Croft	15 November 1978
The staff return from their holidays with a variety of injuries and welcome Mr Tebbs as the new head of Gentleman's Ready-Mades. News of a royal visit to the borough and to Grace Brothers excites the staff and they rehearse what to do for that eventuality. Unfortunately, when watching the royal party approach, Mrs Slocombe knocks a pot plant off the windowsill that lands too close to Prince Philip. Note: First appearance of Mr Tebbs. Filmed: 29 October 1978
36	"The Club"	Bob Spiers	Jeremy Lloyd and David Croft	22 November 1978
The department are offered a basement room in the store that they can turn into a social club, which they agree to decorate for Young Mr Grace's budget of £300 and split it between them. The process soon devolves into fighting when the job proves too much. Guest starring Mavis Pugh. Filmed: 5 November 1978
37	"Do You Take This Man?"	Bob Spiers	Jeremy Lloyd and David Croft	29 November 1978
Mrs Slocombe has become engaged to one Mr Metaxis, a Greek bazouki player, and her American uncle has offered to pay for it all and buy them a house after the ceremony. When Mr Metaxis turns out to be married already and is summoned back to Greece by his wife, the staff fake the wedding in the store to help Mrs Slocombe save face, with Mr Humphries posing as the groom, Mr Lucas as the best man and Mr Tebbs as a Greek Orthodox priest. Guest stars Gorden Kaye, Felix Bowness and Norman Mitchell. Filmed: 12 November 1978
38	"Shedding the Load"	Bob Spiers	Jeremy Lloyd and David Croft	6 December 1978
Continually falling sales mean that it has been decided one if the floor staff is to be made redundant. Unable to pick someone himself, Mr Rumbold lets the staff decide which one of them will go via secret ballot, and Mr Harman runs a book on who will get the chop. Filmed: 19 November 1978
39	"A Bliss Girl"	Bob Spiers	Jeremy Lloyd and David Croft	13 December 1978
Heavy fog delays the staff and prevents the arrival of a girl sent to man the new "Bliss" perfume stall. Mrs Slocombe and Miss Brahms refuse to run it, so Mr Humphries is sent across to do so. When Mr Tebbs complains that this leaves Gentleman's Ready-Mades understaffed, Mr Rumbold orders an enraged Captain Peacock to cover for Mr Humphries, to the delight of Mr Lucas and Mr Harman. Guest stars Jan Holden and Bernice Adams. Filmed: 26 November 1978
Special
40	"Happy Returns"	Bob Spiers	Jeremy Lloyd and David Croft	26 December 1978
For another of Young Mr Grace's birthdays the staff sing to him and sit through the traditional free lunch. They also rehearse their cabaret act for his party, The Ballet of the Toys, but when the professional cabaret performers arrive intending to perform the same routine the department fall back on top hat and tails. Note: Last appearance of Mr Tebbs. Filmed: 3 December 1978

=== Series 7 (1979) ===
No.	Title	Directed by	Written by	Original release date
41	"The Junior"	David Croft	Jeremy Lloyd and David Croft	19 October 1979
When Mr Tebbs retires and Mr Humphries and Mr Lucas are promoted, a post for junior assistant is advertised. The final and successful applicant is Mr Goldberg, who quickly proves to be gifted at selling (especially to his friends) and endearing to all except Captain Peacock, who may have served alongside Mr Goldberg in the War. Guest starring Tony Sympson. Note: First appearance of Mr Goldberg. Filmed: 16 September 1979
42	"Strong Stuff, This Insurance"	Gordon Elsbury	Jeremy Lloyd and David Croft	26 October 1979
A group insurance scheme promising sizeable pensions sees the staff enduring a physical examination, which they prepare for by having Mr Humphries engage his former ballet instructor for a keep-fit class. They are then summoned to Young Mr Grace's office to hear their results, although there is confusion about some office furniture. Guest stars Amanda Barrie and Joy Allen. Filmed: 23 September 1979
43	"The Apartment"	David Croft and Gordon Elsbury	Jeremy Lloyd and David Croft	2 November 1979
Mrs Slocombe is refused the day off to move into her new flat, and things get worse when squatters prevent the removal men installing her furniture. When her colleagues prove unhelpful Young Mr Grace allows her and her furniture to reside in the empty Furniture Department, and she delights in arranging everything into a cosy home-from-home. However, a sudden transport strike means that she finds herself inundated with overnight guests. Guest starring Jeffrey Holland. Filmed: 30 September 1979
44	"Mrs Slocombe, Senior Person"	Gordon Elsbury	Jeremy Lloyd and David Croft	9 November 1979
Mr Rumbold is stricken with food poisoning and Mrs Slocombe is temporarily promoted to his place, relishing in the executive perks. But when takings in Ladies' Intimate Apparel flourish under Miss Brahms, and Mr Humphries informs her that she will be ejected from the trade union after two weeks as a manager, she worries that she will have no job to go back to. However, one of Mrs Rumbold's homemade meringues may save her. Guest stars Avril Angers and Gorden Kaye. Note: This was Mollie Sugden's favourite episode, and was repeated as a tribute to her on 18 July 2009 after her death. Filmed: 6 October 1979
45	"The Hero"	Gordon Elsbury	Jeremy Lloyd and David Croft	16 November 1979
Captain Peacock is horrified when he learns that Mr Franco of the Sports Department has spread a secret from the fitting room. To defend his honour he challenges Mr Franco to a boxing match, but backs out on "doctor's advice". It falls to Mr Humphries, and ultimately Mrs Slocombe, to save the honour of both Captain Peacock and the department as a whole. Guest starring Jackie Pallo. Filmed: 13 October 1979
46	"Anything You Can Do"	Gordon Elsbury	Jeremy Lloyd and David Croft	23 November 1979
After complaining once too often about the quality of the canteen meals, and refusing to defuse the situation with an apology to the manageress, the department end up staffing the canteen themselves. They also find that they lack the ability to cook a decent meal, and their apparent profit is very quickly eaten away. Guest starring Ronnie Brody. Filmed: 20 October 1979
47	"The Agent"	Gordon Elsbury	Jeremy Lloyd and David Croft	30 November 1979
The rest of the floor staff discover that Mr Goldberg has a lucrative sideline in staff recruitment, helping people get better-paying jobs at other stores. When Mr Humphries and Mrs Slocombe receive desirable offers, Captain Peacock and Mr Rumbold struggle to keep them at Grace Brothers without offering any wage increases. Guest starring Jeffrey Segal, Renu Setna and Peggy Ann Clifford. Filmed: 27 October 1979
Special
48	"The Punch and Judy Affair"	David Croft	Jeremy Lloyd and David Croft	26 December 1979
When the floor chose to scab on a company-wide strike, they find they have become pariahs. To regain favour they agree to hold a party for the striking workers' children featuring a life-size Punch and Judy show, directed by Mr Humphries, with Mr Lucas and Miss Brahms as the titular characters. Mrs Slocombe is unenchanted with her role as a policewoman, Captain Peacock overacts as The Devil, Mr Goldberg begrudges the theft of his chipolatas and Mr Rumbold's musical accompaniment pushes Mr Humphries over the edge. Note: Last appearances of Mr Lucas and Mr Goldberg.

=== Series 8 (1981) ===
No.	Title	Directed by	Written by	Original release date
49	"Is It Catching?"	John Kilby	Jeremy Lloyd and David Croft	9 April 1981
Young Mr Grace steps down in favour of Old Mr Grace, Mr Spooner of the Paint Department replaces Mr Lucas, and part of the Shoe Department, including senior salesman Mr Grossman, is merged with Ladies' Intimate Apparel and Gentleman's Ready-Mades. This is underwritten by Mr Humphries catching "Marine's Disease", which sees the whole department quarantined in the basement to prevent spreading the disease any further. Guest starring John D. Collins. Note: First appearances of Old Mr Grace, Mr Spooner and Mr Grossman. Filmed: 3 April 1981
50	"A Personal Problem"	John Kilby	Jeremy Lloyd and David Croft	16 April 1981
The Peacocks experience another marital upset, this time when Mrs Peacock gets her own back by taking a job as Mr Rumbold's secretary and letting her husband believe that they are having an affair. Outraged at being cuckolded by his superior, Captain Peacock goes to great lengths trying to catch them in flagrante and save his marriage. Guest stars Diana King and Jack Haig. Filmed: 10 April 1981
51	"Front Page Story"	John Kilby	Jeremy Lloyd and David Croft	23 April 1981
A store magazine is created and Mr Humphries appointed editor because of his ability to get items for the gossip column. Old Mr Grace suggests a store beauty contest with a cash bonus for the winning department, and the staff arrange for Miss Brahms to be entered as a ringer. When she refuses Mrs Slocombe steps up, but it is Mr Humphries who ends up winning the prize. Filmed: 17 April 1981
52	"Sit Out"	John Kilby	Jeremy Lloyd and David Croft	30 April 1981
With the department's sales at an all-time low, Old Mr Grace threatens to either cut their wages by 10% or move them into the little-frequented Bargain Basement. To protest their treatment the staff come into work late and barricade themselves on the rooftop, backed by Mr Harman and all in the Maintenance and Packing Department, but their strike becomes dangerous when a fire breaks out in the building. Note: Last appearance of Mr Grossman. Filmed: 24 April 1981
53	"Heir Apparent"	John Kilby	Jeremy Lloyd and David Croft	7 May 1981
After seeing a photograph of Mr Humphries' mother in her days as a chorus girl, Old Mr Grace thinks that Mr Humphries may be his long-lost son and the heir to the store. Mrs Humphries arrives to confirm the story, but it soon comes out that there were two girls called Annie in the chorus line. Mr Klein replaces Mr Grossman as the head of Gentleman's Ready-Mades, on loan from the Cutting Department. Note: First appearance of Mr Klein, and a dual credit for John Inman as both Mr Humphries and his mother. Filmed: 1 May 1981
54	"Closed Circuit"	John Kilby	Jeremy Lloyd and David Croft	21 May 1981
Grace Brothers' new advertising campaign features Miss Brahms displaying items on television screens in the windows, but when her Cockney accent proves unsuitable she is "dubbed" by Old Mr Grace's nurse. The wealthy Lord Hirly sees the advert and falls in love with the voice, sending a note inviting Miss Brahms and her "parents" - Captain Peacock and Mrs Slocombe - out to dinner. Their plans for Miss Brahms to imitate the nurse fall through when Old Mr Grace, with his nurse, arrive at the same restaurant and Lord Hirly hears them first. Guest stars Gorden Kaye and John D. Collins. Filmed: 8 May 1981
55	"The Erotic Dreams of Mrs Slocombe"	John Kilby	Jeremy Lloyd and David Croft	28 May 1981
Mrs Slocombe has been suffering from repeated erotic dreams involving Mr Humphries, and his lack of reciprocation has driven her to alcoholism. After an unsuccessful attempt to find a partner through a lonely hearts magazine, Mr Humphries is ordered to show her some attention when the staff attend a ballet concert. Guest stars Brenda Cowling, Jack Haig and Rusty Goffe. Filmed: 15 May 1981
Special
56	"Roots?"	John Kilby	Jeremy Lloyd and David Croft	24 December 1981
For Old Mr Grace's 90th birthday the department want to pay a musical tribute to him, as it costs them nothing. With the help of Mr Rumbold's genealogist brother, their act explores the Grace family history through Wales, Scotland, Somerset and (apparently) deepest Africa. Note: Last appearances of Mr Klein and both Old and Young Mr Grace. Nicholas Smith appears in a dual role as both Mr Rumbold and his brother Mycroft. This episode is sometimes omitted in television repeats due to the final musical number, which featured the main cast (except Wendy Richard) in blackface. Filmed: 23 May 1981

=== Series 9 (1983) ===
David Croft did not co-write the final two series, but did act as executive producer.

No.	Title	Directed by	Written by	Original release date
57	"The Sweet Smell of Success"	Bob Spiers	Jeremy Lloyd	22 April 1983
To supplement her poor wages and meagre commission, Mrs Slocombe starts selling her homemade perfume under the counter. Unfortunately it seems to have some extraordinary qualities, which land Captain Peacock in trouble with his wife when she catches him with Mr Rumbold's new secretary, Miss Belfridge. Guest starring Diana King. Note: First appearance of Miss Belfridge. Filmed: 18 March 1983
58	"Conduct Unbecoming"	Bob Spiers	Jeremy Lloyd	29 April 1983
Mr Humphries is in hot water for being frequently late to work, having moved out of home after an argument with his mother. When £50 goes missing from the till he is accused of stealing it by Captain Peacock and Mr Rumbold, leading to a mock trial in which Mrs Slocombe acts as his defence. He is found guilty and forced to resign, but the money is found wedged in the back of the till and Mrs Humphries phones to ask her son to come home. Guest starring Tony Sympson. Filmed: 25 March 1983
59	"Memories are Made of This"	Bob Spiers	Jeremy Lloyd	6 May 1983
When illness sweeps the Sports Department, Ladies' Intimate Apparel and Gentleman's Ready-Mades inherit their only healthy assistant, golf pro Mr Walpole. While demonstrating his golf swing Captain Peacock hits Mrs Slocombe in the head with a golf ball, leaving her with amnesia and believing that she is a little girl again. Guest stars Jess Conrad and Ballard Berkeley. Filmed: 1 April 1983
60	"Calling All Customers"	Bob Spiers	Jeremy Lloyd	13 May 1983
Grace Brothers opts to advertise on CB radio and the staff are asked to come up with a show to frame around the advert, with Miss Belfridge assessing their submissions. Mr Harman's countryside saga is chosen, but the rehearsals are broadcast live on the air and risk attracting the wrong type of customer. Guest stars Nosher Powell and Ron Tarr, with the voices of Vicki Michelle and Robbie Coltrane. Filmed: 8 April 1983
61	"Monkey Business"	Bob Spiers	Jeremy Lloyd	20 May 1983
When the large pay-rise they are promised is withdrawn and the store is at risk of a Japanese takeover bid, the staff decide to protest by visiting the Prime Minister at 10 Downing Street. Elsewhere, a monkey has escaped from the Pet Department and is hiding in the lift shafts. Guest stars John D. Collins, Rusty Goffe and the voice of Jan Ravens. Filmed: 15 April 1983
62	"Lost and Found"	Bob Spiers	Jeremy Lloyd	27 May 1983
Tiddles, Mrs Slocombe's beloved cat, has been missing for nearly a week. Fearing the worst, the rest of the staff club together and buy her a kitten to replace it. When Mr Humphries tries to present it to her she misinterprets him as proposing marriage and accepts. Guest stars Norman Mitchell. Filmed: 22 April 1983

=== Series 10 (1985) ===
No.	Title	Directed by	Written by	Original release date
63	"Goodbye Mrs Slocombe"	Martin Shardlow	Jeremy Lloyd	18 February 1985
Floor staff above a certain age are in line for redundancy, among them Mrs Slocombe, who is replaced by the unpleasant Miss Featherstone of the Toiletries Department. The staff try desperately to get Miss Featherstone to leave them, while Mrs Slocombe haunts Mr Rumbold in a series of different low-paying jobs around the store. She gets her revenge when she is reinstated, but further cuts mean Captain Peacock and Mr Rumbold are in line for redundancy. Guest starring Joanna Dunham. Filmed: 22 June 1984
64	"Grounds for Divorce"	Martin Shardlow	Jeremy Lloyd	25 February 1985
Captain Peacock has strayed again, but his lover Miss Bagnold has taken a job in the Accounts Department to be near him; he finds this especially vexing, as he is tired of her and has tried to call it off several times. After being issued with an ultimatum by Mrs Peacock, he is forced to make a decision, and is willing to go to extreme measures. Guest starring Diana Lambert. Filmed: 13 May 1984
65	"The Hold-Up"	Martin Shardlow	Jeremy Lloyd	4 March 1985
The floor staff stay late for stocktaking, but burglars break in and take Miss Brahms hostage. Captain Peacock and Mr Spooner join her as hostages when their police disguises are rumbled. With Mr Rumbold at home in bed and refusing to believe them, it falls to Mr Harman, Mrs Slocombe and Mr Humphries to impersonate a vicious local crime family and free their colleagues. Guest stars Michael Attwell and Ian Collier. Filmed: 17 June 1984
66	"Gambling Fever"	Martin Shardlow	Jeremy Lloyd	11 March 1985
The staff receive their long-awaited bonuses - except for Mr Rumbold, whose bonus has been placed on Mr Grace's racehorse, Inside Leg. After learning from Mr Harman of a dead cert two-horse accumulator, everyone bets their bonuses on the horse, which reawakens Captain Peacock's gambling addiction and leads to Mr Humphries acting the race out over the CCTV system. Miss Belfridge is unable to decide between two equally revealing bathing costumes. Filmed: 19 May 1984
67	"The Night Club"	Martin Shardlow	Jeremy Lloyd	18 March 1985
To try and generate more money, the staff are allowed to use the department floor after hours and they decide on a night club with food and music, called "Club Rendezvous". A friend of Mr Humphries agrees to make an advert and show it in his cinema (where Mr Humphries' mother is an usherette), but when the staff go to view it, they find that technical issues mean the picture is lost and that the cinema itself shows questionable films. Guest starring Ronnie Brody and the voice of Vicki Michelle. Filmed: 13 July 1984
68	"Friends and Neighbours"	Martin Shardlow	Jeremy Lloyd	25 March 1985
Rising transportation costs lead Mr Grace to let the staff utilise penthouse apartments above the store. Tensions between the staff emerge when they have to live and work together, especially when Captain Peacock tries to bring Miss Belfridge along and Mr Humphries is left babysitting twin babies. Guest stars Diana Lambert and Carol Cleveland. Filmed: 27 May 1984
69	"The Pop Star"	Martin Shardlow	Jeremy Lloyd	1 April 1985
Just when Mr Spooner is to be sacked for his persistent lateness, he is offered a contract by a record company after his successful turn singing "Chanson D'Amour" at the Department Store Annual Concert and his colleagues jostle to be backup on his record. The staff are then offered a spot on a local television show, but Mr Spooner's throat gives out and the backup tape also causes a problem. Guest stars Nick Ross and Suzy Aitchison. Filmed: 27 July 1984

=== Special (2016) ===
No.	Title	Directed by	Written by	Original release date	UK viewers (millions)
70	"You Can't Teach a New Dog Old Tricks"	Dewi Humphreys	Derren Litten	28 August 2016	6.56
With Young Mr Grace's estranged grandson taking over Grace Brothers, and wanting a younger face to the shop, Mr Conway is hired as the junior in menswear, taking a liking to Miss Brahms at the same time; meanwhile Mr Grainger returns as the senior of the department and Mrs Slocombe has problems at home. This was a one-off special to celebrate BBC Comedy and filmed on 5 March 2016.

== Bibliography ==
- Richard Webber, "I'm Free! – The Complete Are You Being Served?", Orion Books, 1999
