= Landmark Sitcom Season =

Television series

Landmark Sitcom Season is a BBC project, launched in March 2016, to mark 60 years since Hancock's Half Hour started on BBC television.

As part of ongoing celebrations throughout 2016, the BBC commissioned new scripts for iconic British sitcoms of the prior six decades.

== Sitcoms ==
=== New episodes ===
The landmark sitcom season began in the summer of 2016 with a live airing of Mrs. Brown's Boys.

No.	Title	Show	Directed by	Written by	Original release date	UK viewers (millions)
1	"Mammy Sutra"	Mrs. Brown's Boys	Ben Kellett	Brendan O'Carroll	23 July 2016	9.09
When Agnes discovers that Mark and Betty are having bedroom problems, she takes it upon herself to help. Meanwhile, as Dermot's business grows, he has a difficult decision to make about his best friend Buster.
2	"You Can't Teach a New Dog Old Tricks"	Are You Being Served?	Dewi Humphreys	Derren Litten	28 August 2016	6.26
Grace Brothers are now under the management of new Young Mr Grace (Mathew Horne), the grandson of the store's founder. Determined to drag retailing into the modern era of 1988, the new owner has to overturn the old ways still favoured by Captain Peacock (John Challis), Mrs Slocombe (Sherrie Hewson), Mr Humphries (Jason Watkins), Miss Brahms (Niky Wardley), Mr Grainger (Roy Barraclough), Mr Harman (Arthur Smith), Mr Rumbold (Justin Edwards), and newcomer Mr Conway, played by Kayode Ewumi.
3	"Porridge"	Porridge	Dominic Brigstocke	Dick Clement and Ian La Frenais	28 August 2016	5.38
40 years after his grandfather, Norman Stanley Fletcher, served time at HMP Slade, Nigel Norman Fletcher (Kevin Bishop) has been sentenced to five years for computer hacking.
4	"Young Hyacinth"	Keeping Up Appearances	Sandy Johnson	Roy Clarke	2 September 2016	4.14
The 1950s see a young Hyacinth Walton(Kerry Howard) working as a maid for the well-off Cooper-Smiths. She and her siblings live together in a crowded canal cottage with their father, a part-time brush salesman with a drink problem. She dreams of the day when she succeeds in transforming her sisters, Daisy, Violet and Rose, into an altogether better class of family.
5	"Many Happy Returns"	Goodnight Sweetheart	Martin Dennis	Laurence Marks and Maurice Gran	2 September 2016	4.66
It is 1962 and Gary Sparrow has been trapped in the past for 17 years. About to celebrate his birthday, he decides to visit the hospital on the very day he was born. Aware of the delicate nature of the fabric of space and time, Gary is not prepared for what happens next. How have Yvonne and Ron coped in his absence? What will Phoebe and Reg do if he doesn't return?

=== Lost sitcoms ===
In addition to the new episodes produced, the BBC also commissioned remakes of three episodes from its classic sitcoms under the banner of the "Lost Sitcoms". Of these, the selected episodes of both Till Death Us Do Part and Hancock's Half Hour are missing from the BBC archives, while the episode of Steptoe and Son, originally broadcast in colour, exists only as an off-air black & white videotape recording.

No.	Title	Show	Directed by	Written by	Original release date	UK viewers (millions)
1	"A Woman's Place Is In The Home"	Till Death Us Do Part	Ben Gosling Fuller	Johnny Speight	1 September 2016	0.57
Alf Garnett arrives home to find himself in an empty house with a burnt supper and sets about putting things right using his local telephone box.
2	"The New Neighbour"	Hancock's Half Hour	Ben Gosling Fuller	Ray Galton & Alan Simpson	8 September 2016	0.35
Tony Hancock's new neighbour has a very, very suspicious night-time routine.
3	"A Winter's Tale"	Steptoe and Son	Ben Gosling Fuller	Ray Galton & Alan Simpson	14 September 2016	0.37
Harold Steptoe is desperate to go on a skiing holiday – but he doesn't want his father Albert there, under any circumstances.

== Under consideration ==
Another sitcom marked for possible remake and broadcast was Up Pompeii!. Writer Derren Litten, who wrote the revival of Are You Being Served, revealed on his Facebook page that he was also commissioned to write an episode of Hi-De-Hi for this season that was ultimately not used.
