= Spooner's Patch =

- Created by: Ray Galton; Johnny Speight
- Directed by: William G. Stewart
- Starring: Ronald Fraser; Peter Cleall; Norman Rossington; Patricia Hayes; John Lyons; Donald Churchill
- Country of origin: United Kingdom
- Original language: English
- No. of series: 3
- No. of episodes: 19

Production
- Running time: 30 minutes
- Production company: ATV/Central

Original release
- Network: ITV
- Release: 9 July 1979 – 24 August 1982

Spooners Patch is a British television sitcom, written by Ray Galton and Johnny Speight. It ran for 3 series and 19 episodes and was first broadcast from 9 July 1979 to 24 August 1982 on the ITV network, by ATV. A pilot episode was taped in 1978 with Ian Bannen as Inspector Spooner, after ATV commissioned a full series, he was replaced with Ronald Fraser, who subsequently left after the first series and was replaced by Donald Churchill who played the role the remainder of its run.

== Plot ==
It is set in a police station in the fictional London suburb of Woodley. The title character of Spooner is the inspector in charge who is engaged in various corrupt ventures and lives above the station. The other main characters are the officers who work under him, including DC Bolsover who thinks he is from Starsky & Hutch and drives around in a Ford Anglia in the same red and white colour scheme as their Ford Torino; the sardonic PC Killick, the bigoted PC Goatman and the irascible traffic warden Mrs. Cantaford. Spooner also has to contend with various members of the criminal fraternity including Kelly, an Irish grass who frequently torments the station staff with his presence, he was later succeeded by another informer, Jimmy the Con in later episodes.

== Cast list ==
- Ronald Fraser as Inspector Spooner (1979)
- Donald Churchill as Inspector Spooner (1980–1982)
- Peter Cleall as Detective Constable Bolsover
- John Lyons as PC Killick
- Patricia Hayes as Mrs. Cantaford
- Norman Rossington as PC Goatman
- Dermot Kelly as Kelly
- Lynn Farleigh as Mrs. Webster
- John Clegg as Vicar
- Donald Morley as Mayor
- Ronnie Brody as Waiter, Man in police station
- Roy Barraclough as Landlord
- Amanda Barrie as Spooner's girlfriend
- Ballard Berkeley as Bank Manager
- Barrie Rutter as Psychiatrist
- Harry Fowler as Jimmy the Con
- Reginald Marsh as Senior Police Officer
- James Villiers as Film Producer
- Jonathan Cecil as Captain Jim
- Wendy Richard as Girl
- Stuart Saunders as Golf club secretary
- Bob Bryan as Mr. Webster
- Mary Conlon as Bulsover’s girlfriend
- Chris Cunningham as Dutch Sailor
- Jack Douglas as Man in car
- Frank Coda as Jimmy’s friend
- Jeffrey Segal as Bank manager
- Lee Whitlock as Boy
- John Barron as the Golf Club President
- Willy Bowman as Dutch Sailor
- Sarah Carthy as Killick’s girlfriend
- Anthony Sharp as Doctor
- Ruby Buchanan as Old lady
- John Louis Mansi as Waiter
- Ava Cadell as Greta
- Mavis Pugh as Woman
- Terry Gurry as Dutch Sailor
- Bill Treacher as Car owner
- Debbie Linden as Film girl
- Bella Emberg as the Mayor’s wife
- Richard Fraser as TV reporter
- Richard Sheekey as Dutch sailor
- Stan Van as 2nd waiter
- Billy Gray as Postman
- Richard Speight as Clapper Boy

== Episodes ==
=== Series 1 (1979) ===
No. overall	No. in series	Title	Original release date
1	1	"The Unwanted Prisoner"	9 July 1979
2	2	"The Morning After"	16 July 1979
3	3	"The Presentation Clock"	6 August 1979
4	4	"The Mayor’s Brother"	13 August 1979
5	5	"Par For the Course"	20 August 1979
6	6	"The Share Out"	27 August 1979

=== Series 2 (1980) ===
No. overall	No. in series	Title	Original release date
7	1	"High Noon"	4 September 1980
8	2	"Psycho on the Roof"	11 September 1980
9	3	"Spooner’s Box"	18 September 1980
10	4	"Drag-Net"	25 September 1980
11	5	"Spooner’s Patch Thatch"	9 October 1980
12	6	"The Birthday Double"	16 October 1980

=== Series 3 (1982) ===
No. overall	No. in series	Title	Original release date
13	1	"The Big Match"	15 April 1982
14	2	"The Lock-Up"	22 April 1982
15	3	"Finders, Keepers"	29 April 1982
16	4	"The Sting"	6 May 1982
17	5	"Suffer the Little Children"	13 May 1982
18	6	"Vote Mrs. Cantaford"	20 May 1982
19	7	"Police Intelligence"	27 May 1982

== Archive Status ==
16 episodes exist complete in broadcast quality 2" masters, the original transmission tapes for two episodes "The Share Out" and "High Noon" were wiped, however Ray Galton kept personal copies of the missing episodes, which now form part of the archive. The broadcast master for "Vote Mrs. Cantaford" was damaged, Galton's own copy was utilized for the later DVD release.

== Home Media ==
The complete series was released on DVD by Network on 25 July 2011. The boxset featured scripts from all 19 episodes and the 1978 pilot. Initially an online only release, it was subsequently retailed in shops from 13 August 2012 onwards.
