= You Can't Teach a New Dog Old Tricks =

- Are You Being Served? episode
- Directed by: Dewi Humphreys
- Written by: Derren Litten
- Editing by: Chris Wadsworth
- Original air date: 28 August 2016
- Running time: 30 minutes

Guest appearances
- Alex J. Phelps as 501 Customer; Daniel Croucher as 501's Friend

Episode chronology
← Previous "The Pop Star"	Next → —

"You Can't Teach a New Dog Old Tricks" is a one-off revival episode of the British television sitcom Are You Being Served?. Written by Derren Litten, the episode serves a direct continuation of the series, set in 1988 and featuring the same characters as the original sitcom.

Broadcast as part of the BBC's anniversary programming event titled the Landmark Sitcom Season, the episode received generally unfavourable reception from viewers and a subsequent series was not renewed.

== Premise ==
The episode, set in 1988, follows Young Mr Grace's grandson who hires a new member of staff, the youthful Mr Conway, in an attempt to modernise Grace Bros. However, Mr Humphries, Mrs Slocombe, Captain Peacock and Mr Rumbold prove resistant to change.

== Cast ==
- Jason Watkins as Mr Humphries
- Sherrie Hewson as Mrs Slocombe
- John Challis as Captain Peacock
- Roy Barraclough as Mr Grainger
- Kayode Ewumi as Mr Conway
- Niky Wardley as Miss Brahms
- Arthur Smith as Mr Harman
- Mathew Horne as Young Mr Grace
- Justin Edwards as Mr Rumbold
- Jorgie Porter as Miss Croft

== Development ==
=== Background ===
The episode was first announced in February 2016. Writer Derren Litten described writing the episode as "the most fun I have ever had as a professional writer". The episode, set in 1988, is a direct continuation of the original series. It was recorded on 5 March 2016, at The Studios in MediaCityUK, Salford. Tickets to attend the recording of the programme as part of the live studio audience went on sale in February 2016.

=== Casting ===
The cast, showing left to right: Arthur Smith (Mr Harman), Jorgie Porter (Miss Croft), Niky Wardley (Miss Brahms), Justin Edwards (Mr Rumbold), Sherrie Hewson (Mrs Slocombe), Mathew Horne (Mr Grace), John Challis (Captain Peacock), Jason Watkins (Mr Humphries), Kayode Ewumi (Mr Conway), Roy Barraclough (Mr Grainger).

Former Only Fools and Horses actor John Challis portrayed Captain Peacock; former Coronation Street actors Sherrie Hewson and Roy Barraclough were cast as Mrs Slocombe and Mr Grainger respectively, and comedian Arthur Smith was cast as Mr Harman. Mr Humphries was portrayed by Jason Watkins, Miss Brahms by Niky Wardley, and Mr Rumbold by Justin Edwards. New characters introduced in the show included Young Mr Grace's grandson, Mr Grace, played by Mathew Horne; Miss Croft, who was named as a tribute to the co-creator of the series, David Croft, and was played by Jorgie Porter; and newcomer Mr Conway, played by Kayode Ewumi, cast to align with the intention of the Landmark Sitcom Season to feature more diverse casting. The episode marked the return of Mr Grainger, who left the original series in Series 5 (1977).

== Broadcast and ratings ==
"You Can't Teach a New Dog Old Tricks" was first broadcast at 9:00 pm on 28 August 2016, being part of the BBC's programming event, the Landmark Sitcom Season, which was a celebration of sixty years of television sitcoms. It aired before the revival episode of Porridge.

The episode achieved overnight viewing figures of 5,039,000 million, a 24.5% share of that night's television audience, despite competing with the opening episode of ITV drama series Victoria; it was also the tenth-most watched British comedy of 2016. The episode was watched by 6.26 million people within seven days of its broadcast, making it the fourth most-watched BBC One programme for the week ending 28 August. 6.56 million viewers watched the episode within 28 days of its initial broadcast.

In October 2016, it was confirmed that the BBC would not be renewing Are You Being Served? for a new series.

== Reception ==
Professional ratings
Review scores
Source	Rating
The Telegraph	2/5 stars
Medium	2/5 stars

The episode received generally negative reception upon broadcast, with mixed reception on Jason Watkins's portrayal of Mr Humphries. Several viewers criticised the show's humour and casting on Twitter prior to broadcast. Michael Hogan, writing for The Telegraph, believed the episode to be "without much of a plot", criticising Litten's script for its obvious jokes and dialogue that "clanked and creaked". Hogan praised the inclusion of Mr Conway, who served as a chorus that modern audiences could relate to, but believed Watkins's portrayal of Mr Humphries to be the "biggest misfire" in the episode, criticising Watkins's overplaying of the character. Hogan felt that the overall humour of the episode was "tired and limp", and suggested that further revival of seventies sitcoms be left alone.

Graeme Virtue of The Guardian called the episode "old-fashioned", though he believed the script to be "elevated by a game cast", particularly noting Watkins's innuendo-laden portrayal of Mr Humphries. Ryan Leston, writing for Yahoo! News, called the episode "absolutely rubbish", criticising the episode's dated, "cringeworthy" jokes and its "nonsensical" scripts. Although stating that the acting was "rather good", Leston ultimately felt that the episode was "a horrific rehash of a tired, stagnant format". Dan Owen, writing for Medium, believed the episode was "a decent tribute act" to the original series, praising both the performances of the actors and Litten's script, which "kept the spirit of the original series alive" with "lashings of innuendo, broad caricatures, and moments of slapstick", though noted much of the humour was predictable. Owen believed that it was "hard to get too upset" about the episode, which "did exactly what you'd expect[...] for a Sunday night BBC audience".

Stuart Jeffries of The Guardian, who believed the original sitcom to be misogynistic and homophobic, was pleased that Litten "didn't airbrush the show, but fondly disinterred its double entendres", but ultimately was glad that the episode was "only a one-off, though". Joni Blyth, writing for the Evening Standard, stated that, while praising Watkins's "admirable" performance, Edwards's "understated" performance as Mr Rumbold "is the glue that holds this special together". Mark Lawson, reviewing the Landmark Sitcom Season as a whole, described the episode as "most obviously a cover version" of the original series, noting that Watkins and Hewson offered "karaoke acting, more or less copying the intonations, body language and costumes of John Inman and Mollie Sugden".
