= National Campaign for the Reform of the Obscene Publications Acts =

Anti-Censorship Campaign

The National Campaign for the Reform of the Obscene Publications Acts (NCROPA) was an anti-censorship campaigning organisation whose goal was the reform of Britain's obscenity laws, in particular the Obscene Publications Act 1959. It was set up in 1976 by the actor David Webb as a response to Mary Whitehouse's conservative morality group National Viewers and Listeners Association. NCROPA's original name was the National Campaign for the Repeal of the Obscene Publications Acts, but "Repeal" was soon amended to "Reform" under pressure, despite Mary Millington objecting. From the late 1970s, NCROPA was affiliated to the National Council for Civil Liberties (NCCL). The last year for which NCROPA had any measurable activity was 1998, and with the death of its founder in June 2012 it effectively ceased to exist.

In December 2014, it was absorbed into the Campaign Against Censorship, an organisation with which it had had an overlapping membership. The NCROPA's archives are now held by Warwick University's Modern Records Centre.

== Notable members ==
- Pamela Manson, actress (committee member)
- Gerald Fowler, politician and academic (committee member)
- John Julius Norwich, writer and historian (committee member)
- Mary Millington, model and actress

== See also ==
- Campaign Against Censorship
- Pornography in the United Kingdom
