= John Lyons (actor) =

British actor (b. 1943)

- Born: John Lyons; 14 September 1943 (age 82); Whitechapel, London, England
- Occupation: Actor
- Years active: 1963–present
- Known for: A Touch of Frost

John Lyons (born 14 September 1943) is an English stage and screen actor. He played Detective Sergeant George Toolan in the long-running UK detective drama A Touch of Frost (1992–2010) alongside David Jason.

== Early life ==
Lyons was born in Whitechapel in 1943, the son of a dock worker and an office cleaner, and the youngest of three children. Aged six, he would help the local milkman deliver milk to the neighbouring block of flats before school. Leaving school at fifteen, Lyons became a labourer for British Rail at Paddington Station. An aspiring footballer, every Sunday morning, he and several hundred others would play football on Hackney Marshes. Aged 17, a member of his team happened to be a journalist who gave him a business card advertising a new drama school, East 15. Lyons attended the drama school for three years after being accepted after an audition.

== Career ==
Lyons' first acting job out of drama school was in Catch Hand, after which he worked consistently in many popular television series, including On the Buses, Man About the House, George and Mildred, Doctor in Charge, and UFO. Lyons also had a prominent role as Detective Sgt. Jim Huke in a 1976 episode of The Sweeney. Shortly thereafter, he appeared in the second film of the series.

Following appearances in Spooner's Patch, Bottle Boys, and Upstairs Downstairs, Lyons starred opposite David Jason in the detective series A Touch of Frost as DS George Toolan, a role he played from 1992 until the show's end in 2010. In addition, Lyons also starred in Shameless, Spooks, and Doctors.

Lyons has had a long and successful theatre career. In September 2005, he joined the cast of the world's longest-running play, The Mousetrap, in London's West End. In 2015 and 2016, Lyons toured the UK in a stage adaptation of the BBC amateur detective series Father Brown. He is also a regular performer in Pantomime throughout the country, having appeared in the role of "King Crumble" in Sleeping Beauty at the Marina Theatre, Lowestoft, in December 2015. Lyons also appeared for the second time as special guest at a 43tv Retro TV Sweeney Meet in October 2016 in Hammersmith, London, where he gave an after-dinner talk about his career in TV & Film.

In 2018, Lyons appeared in Ray Cooney's Caught in the Net and in a new play The Eleventh Hour, set in war time. For both the 2018/2019 and 2019/2020 Christmas season, Lyons appeared in pantomime at Bridlington Spa in Bridlington as "The King" in Jack and the Beanstalk and "Baron Hardup" in Cinderella, respectively.

== Personal life ==
Born a true Cockney from the East End of London, Lyons had to take elocution lessons every morning at drama school to remove his accent.

== Filmography ==
=== Film ===
Year	Title	Role	Notes
1973	Yellow Dog	Homicidal Maniac	
1978	Sweeney 2	Mead	
1988	Action Jackson	Yacht Guard	
1990	Bullseye!	Train Guard	
1998	Blues Brothers 2000	Russian Thug	

=== Television ===
Year	Title	Role	Notes
1966–1967	United!	Alan Murdoch	70 episodes
1971	Dr. Jekyll and Sister Hyde	Second Sailor	
1971–1973	On the Buses	Bert / Sid / Bill	4 episodes
1974	My Name is Harry Worth	Arthur	1 episode
1975	Man About The House	Binman	1 episode
1976	The Sweeney	DS Jim Huke	1 episode
1976–1979	George and Mildred	Barman / Milkman / Decorator	3 episodes
1984–1985	The Bill	Fire Investigation Officer / Fire Officer	2 episodes
1979	Spooner's Patch	PC Killick	3 episodes
1988	The Nineteenth Hole	Dennis	7 episodes
1992–2010	A Touch of Frost	DS George Toolan	39 episodes
