= Mavis Pugh =

British actress (1914–2006)

- Born: Mavis Gladys Fox Pugh; 25 June 1914; Croydon, Surrey, England
- Died: 6 December 2006 (aged 92); Chichester, West Sussex, England
- Years active: 1939–1993
- Spouse: John Clegg (m. 1959)

Mavis Gladys Fox Pugh (25 June 1914 – 6 December 2006) was a British actress who made many appearances (typically playing upper-class women) in several sitcoms including Dad's Army, Are You Being Served? and Fawlty Towers. Her best known role was as Lady Lavender Southwick in all four series of You Rang, M'Lord?. Before appearing on television, she had a long and successful career in repertory theatre, including with the Arthur Brough Players.

== Early life ==
Pugh was born in Croydon, Surrey on 25 June 1914. Her father was a London solicitor, and her acting talent was first noticed while performing in school plays at Downs College in Folkestone, Kent. Pugh won a scholarship to the International School of Acting. Having worked in rep in Amersham, Buckinghamshire, Pugh toured in 1939 with My Wife's Family and in 1943 made her West End debut in Junior Miss. As well as doing several years in rep, Pugh toured music halls and clubs with Hugh Paddick with the pair trying to beat each other's ad-libbing.

While performing at the Golders Green Hippodrome in 1956, she was spotted by Jimmy Perry, who then invited her to join his rep company at the Palace Theatre in Watford. There she met John Clegg, an actor 20 years her junior who was later best known as pianist Gunner Graham in the BBC sitcom It Ain't Half Hot Mum. They married in 1959.

== Later life ==
Pugh did not begin her television career until the age of 60, with an appearance in the 1974 Dad's Army episode "The Captain's Car". Two years later she appeared in one episode of It Ain't Half Hot Mum, titled "Ticket to Blighty", and in Are You Being Served? in the episode "Fifty Years On". She also appeared in two other Are You Being Served? episodes, "Take-over" and "The Club", both as different characters. In 1979, Pugh played Mrs Chase in the Fawlty Towers episode "The Kipper and the Corpse". Pugh had small parts in two films, The Class of Miss MacMichael in 1978 and Brothers and Sisters in 1980.

Pugh appeared in two episodes of Hi-de-Hi! as The Hon. Winifred Dempster, the aunt of camp entertainments manager Clive Dempster - the 1986 episode "God Bless Our Family" (Series 8) and the 1988 episode "Wedding Bells" (Series 9). From 1987 to 1988, she played Mrs Barrable in four episodes of the Ronnie Corbett sitcom Sorry!. In 1989, she appeared in an episode of Alas Smith and Jones and an episode of Boon the following year. The largest role of her television career was that of the porridge-hurling Lady Lavender Southwick in all 26 episodes of You Rang, M'Lord?, from 1988 to 1993.

== Death ==
Mavis Pugh died in Chichester, West Sussex on 6 December 2006, aged 92, of natural causes. She was survived by her husband, John Clegg.

== Filmography ==
Year	Title	Role	Notes
1974	Dad's Army	Lady Maltby	
1975	The Growing Pains Of PC Penrose	Mrs. Toombs	
1976	It Ain't Half Hot Mum	Chief Commander Crisp	
1976–78	Are You Being Served?	Claude's Wife/Lady Weeble-Abel-Smith/Roger's Mistress	3 episodes
1978	The Class of Miss MacMichael	Mrs. Barnett	
1979	Fawlty Towers	Mrs. Chase	
1979	Spooner's Patch	Woman	
1980	Brothers and Sisters	The Mother	
1982	The Stanley Baxter Hour	Various Roles	TV film
1986–88	Hi-de-Hi!	The Honourable Winifred Dempster	2 episodes
1987–88	Sorry!	Mrs. Barrable	4 episodes
1988	Life Without George	Mrs. Matthews	
1988–93	You Rang, M'Lord?	Lady Lavender	26 episodes
1989	Close to Home	Miss Rothermere	
1989	Alas Smith and Jones		
1990	Boon	Lady in Office	
