= Night of the Demon (1980 film) =

American horror film by James C. Wasson

- 1983 VHS artwork by VCII, Inc.
- Directed by: James C. Wasson
- Screenplay by: Mike Williams
- Story by: Jim L. Ball
- Produced by: Jim L. Ball
- Starring: Michael Cutt; Joy Allen; Robert Collings; Jodi Lazarus; Richard Fields; Michael Lang; Melanie Graham
- Cinematography: John Quick
- Edited by: Joy Rencher's Editorial Service
- Music by: Stuart Hardy; Dennis McCarthy
- Production company: Aldan Company
- Release date: 1983 (U.S.)
- Running time: 92 minutes (Note: Some VHS releases (such as the 1983 and 1986 VCII, Inc. releases) indicate a 97-minute running time on the box artwork, while the 1987 VHS release by Gemstone Entertainment lists a 95-minute running time; however, the 2011 DVD release by Code Red—which is presented as the "uncut version"—runs approximately 92 minutes.)
- Country: United States
- Language: English
- Budget: $70,000

Night of the Demon is a 1980 (Note: The film is most often classified as a 1980 production, though it contains a copyright date of 1979 in its end credits.) American horror film directed by James C. Wasson, written by Jim L. Ball and Mike Williams, and starring Michael Cutt, Joy Allen, Robert Collings, Jodi Lazarus, Richard Fields, Michael Lang, and Melanie Graham. The film centers on an anthropologist who, along with a group of his pupils, embarks on an expedition to prove the existence of Bigfoot in a rural region of Northern California, only to be stalked and systematically slaughtered by the creature.

Completed in 1979, the film was first released on VHS in the United States in 1983. Due to its graphic violence, the film was deemed a "video nasty" by the British Board of Film Classification, and underwent heavy censorship in the United Kingdom. It later received a DVD release from Code Red in 2011, sourced from a tape master. In November 2021, Severin Films issued the film for the first time on Blu-ray, featuring a 2K scan from the original film elements, which were previously alleged to be lost.

== Plot ==
Bill Nugent, an anthropology professor, is approached by Carla Thomas, a young woman whose father was murdered in the woods in Northern California. She suspects that his death was caused by a Bigfoot who, according to legend, resides in the woods in the region. Despite many disappearances and brutal murders–including the death of a young couple, the manual emasculation of a biker, and the butchering of two Girl Scouts–police have deemed the theory of a Bigfoot being responsible a hoax. Carla requests to accompany Bill along with four of his students—Roy, Pete, Gary, and Linda—on an expedition aiming to prove Bigfoot's existence.

They embark by boat along a river and first camp on the property of an elderly man, Lou Carlson, who has claimed to have witnessed Bigfoot. Lou allows them to stay, but is evasive when they attempt to speak to him. When one of the students, Roy, bribes Lou with alcohol, Lou suggests they seek out Wanda, a recluse who resides deep in the woods and supposedly holds more information about Bigfoot. Meanwhile, a hunter camping nearby is attacked and impaled by the Bigfoot on a jagged branch.

The next day, Nugent and his 5 companions visit the nearby town, where they glean from locals more information about Wanda: She is the daughter of a deranged preacher, Emmet McGinty, whose followers were rumored to engage in inbreeding, cannibalism, and human sacrifice. Emmet has since committed suicide. After learning of this, the group returns to the woods. After the group had fallen asleep that night, they were awoken by chanting. Bill and Roy follow the sound and stumble upon a Satanic sexual ritual involving Wanda around an effigy of Bigfoot; among the practitioners is a local sheriff. Bill interrupts the ritual by firing a gun, causing the cultists to scatter.

In the morning, Bill and the others find their boat missing, with large footprints on the shore. After making plaster casts of the footprints, they push onward. That night, the Bigfoot attacks Linda and Gary while the two have sex, but they survive. The group eventually reaches Wanda's cabin, bribing her with candy, but she has a nervous breakdown when the Bigfoot is mentioned. That night, Pete is attacked by the Bigfoot, who causes him to shoot himself with his rifle. The others attempt to locate Pete but find he has disappeared.

Bill decides to hypnotise Wanda the next day, causing her to recall her abusive childhood: As a teenager, the Bigfoot brutally raped Wanda, an event Emmet had witnessed in horror. Convinced the beast was a demon, Emmet attempted to induce an abortion by forcing Wanda to drink poison. Wanda eventually gave birth to the mutant half-human child, but Emmet killed it moments after its birth. In retaliation, Wanda killed her father, staging it to look like a suicide.

Hoping to find evidence of Wanda's Bigfoot child, Bill explores a nearby cemetery and digs up the infant Bigfoot's skeletal remains. Bigfoot appears in the graveyard and abducts its dead spawn as Bill and the others barricade themselves in Wanda's cabin. Hours later, the Bigfoot hangs Pete's mutilated body on the porch before breaking into the home. Ignoring a dissonantly calm Wanda, the Bigfoot strangles Carla to death as the others shut themselves in the kitchen. The Bigfoot breaks into the kitchen, where he disembowels Gary. Roy attempts to stop him, but the Bigfoot smashes his head through the window and cuts his throat on the glass before impaling Linda with a pitchfork. Finally, the Bigfoot burns Bill's face on the hot stove, leaving him for dead.

Sometime later, Bill lies helplessly in a hospital bed, having been found unconscious in the woods, his face burned. When detectives inquire about Carla and the four missing students, Bill recounts his version of events. Both the police and attending doctors receive his story with disbelief, and the hospital psychologist deems him criminally insane.

== Cast ==
- Michael Cutt as Professor Bill Nugent
- Melanie Graham as Wanda McGinty
- Shannon Cooper as Carla Thomas
- Bob Collings as Roy
- Jodi Lazarus as Linda
- Michael Lang as Pete
- Ray Jarris as Gary
- William F. Nugent as Lou Carlson
- Paul Kelleher as Sheriff
- Barrett Cooper as Reverend Emmet McGinty
- Lynn Eastman-Rossi as Susan Nugent
- Joy Allen as Female Student
- Eugene Dow as Doctor Paxton
- Don Hurst as Doctor Harris
- Terry Wilson as Inspector Stack
- Shane Dixon as Monster
- Richard Fields as Carla's Father
- Sally Swift as Van Lover
- Greg Langdon as Van Lover
- Rob Camp as Motorcyclist
- Michael Lang (Note: The 1983 VCII, Inc. VHS release lists a Michael Lang on the front cover under the list of "starring" actors, and he is also credited on the Internet Movie Database; however, because the film does not have an end credits sequence, his role is undetermined.)
- Kathy Stimac as Girl Scout Jr.
- Renata Lee as Girl Scout Sr.

== Production ==
=== Filming ===
By cinematographer John Quick's recollection, the film's budget was approximately $70,000. Quick had worked with producer Jim L. Ball previously on a 1964 feature he had filmed while attending the University of Southern California entitled Fraternity of Horror.

Principal photography took place in 1979, with the exterior sequences being largely filmed in Valencia, California, near Six Flags Magic Mountain, as well as other undeveloped areas outside Los Angeles. Additional filming locations include at the Feedbin feed store in Malibu, as well as producer Jim L. Ball's private studio on La Brea Avenue, which is where the interior cabin sequences were filmed. (Note: In the documentary short Eye of the Demon: An Interview with John Quick on the 2021 Severin Films Blu-ray, portions of the original screenplay and shooting schedule are shown at the approximately 8 minute-mark, which name several shooting locations and their exact addresses.) The college campus featured in the beginning of the film is that of Immaculate Heart College.

=== Post-production ===
Following the film's completion, a small showing was held largely for cast and crew members, which led to a second screening at a local Los Angeles film festival. After the film performed poorly with audiences at the festival, producer Jim L. Ball shot numerous gore-filled sequences to insert into the film, retrofitting it in a way that each of the graphic murders are told through flashback, and serve as the anthropology students' impetus to capture the bigfoot. According to director James C. Wasson, he had no involvement in the filming of these scenes, and his original cut of the film was much more tame. The final sequence in which the bigfoot murders the remaining students in the cabin was filmed in a makeshift studio in producer Ball's garage in Los Angeles.

== Release ==
=== Censorship ===
Due to its depiction of brutal violence, Night of the Demon was listed as a "video nasty" by the BBFC. It remained banned in the UK until January 1994, when VIPCO resubmitted it to the BBFC, who agreed to pass it with an 18 certificate as long as 1 minute and 41 seconds' worth of gore was deleted. Almost all of the violent scenes were trimmed, but the castration of the biker and the removal of a student's intestines (for use as a flail) were removed completely.

=== Home media ===
The film was released on VHS in the USA in 1983 by the L.A.-based home video company VCII, Inc., who reissued it in 1986. Gemstone Entertainment released another VHS edition in 1987. Vipco released the film on VHS in the UK on September 13, 1993, though, according to the BBFC, cuts were made to the film for this release.

It was later released on DVD for the first time by Black Horse on November 1, 2004, and by Vidtape on November 30 that same year. Code Red released the film as a part of its Maria's "B" Movie Mayhem series on October 11, 2011. It was last released by Mr Fat-W Video on June 21, 2016.

On November 26, 2021, Severin Films released the film on Blu-ray for the first time, as part of their annual Black Friday online sale. Additionally, Severin released a new novelization of the film by Brad Carter, as well as various limited memorabilia, including keychains, figurines, and a small number of Bigfoot masks replicated from the mask used in the film.

== Reception ==
=== Critical response ===
Devon Bertsch of Digital Retribution wrote, "When the Bigfoot is off screen, it is admittedly hard to overlook the film's many, many flaws. Indeed everything that is not the Bigfoot is highly flawed, and even the Bigfoot himself looks pretty crap. The acting, script, FX and the often incongruous score are laughable, but add to the film's wacko charm." A 2½ out of 5 was given to the film by Justin Kerswell of Hysteria Lives!, who called it "undoubtedly the best of the worst of the early 80s backwoods slashers". Dread Central's Chris Haberman stated, "Is this a 'so-bad-it's-good' movie? No. This is one of those rare, largely forgotten films that was taken so seriously by its creators that it is difficult to imagine a large team of people reading the script, enjoying it, coming on-board, and putting in the time and energy to bring the terrible story to life. As such, this is an 'I-must-have-a-fever' movie, because most of what you'll see may feel like a hallucination" and "The film has plenty of problems, but I think the reason its supporters still stand beside this freakshow is that the film works hard to entertain. No matter how clumsy the dialogue and effects may be, these cats were trying to be taken seriously, and the result is too angry and depraved to be considered a lazy cash-in or mocking parody piece. The filmmakers' intention to make an earnestly mean and perverted film is undeniable, and that weird essence turns even the most absurdly executed set pieces into memorable mindfuckers".

Film scholar Scott Von Doviak wrote of the film's representation of violence: "It's a repugnant piece of work all around, yet Night of the Demon earns its place in motion picture history simply by getting more out of the phrase 'horribly mutilated' than any other movie ever made." In the book See No Evil: Banned Films and Video Controversy (2000), writers David Kerekes and David Slater gave the film a favorable assessment, noting it as "oddly engaging... Despite its cheapness, lousy acting and trite script the film is immensely watchable, with a dynamism that kicks off right from the opening pre-title killing."

Rob Hunter of Film School Rejects wrote that the film "is played completely straight, but Night of the Demon is gloriously bonkers."

== Sources ==
- Kerekes, David; Slater, David (2000). See No Evil: Banned Films and Video Controversy. London, England: Headpress. ISBN 978-1-900-48610-1.
- Nash, Jay Robert; Ross, Stanley Ralph (1987). The Motion Picture Guide. Vol. 9. Cinebooks. ISBN 978-0-933-99709-7.
- Newman, Kim (1984). Nightmare Movies: Wide Screen Horror Since 1968. New York City, New York: Proteus Books. ISBN 978-0-862-76215-5.
- Gregory, David (director) (2021a). The Demon Made Me Do It: An Interview with James C. Wasson (Blu-ray documentary short). Severin Films.
- Gregory, David (producer) (2021b). Eye of the Demon: An Interview with John Quick (Blu-ray documentary short). Severin Films.
- Gregory, David (director) (2021c). Just a Little Green Kid Outta Waco, Texas: An Interview with Jim L. Ball (Blu-ray documentary short). Severin Films.
- Scheuer, Steven (1990). Movies on TV and Videocassette, 1991-1992 (15th ed.). New York City, New York: Bantam Books. ISBN 978-0-553-28801-8.
- Von Doviak, Scott (2004). Hick Flicks: The Rise and Fall of Redneck Cinema. Jefferson, North Carolina: McFarland. ISBN 978-0-786-41997-5.
