= David Webb (anti-censorship campaigner) =

English activist

- Born: David Alec Webb; 6 March 1931; Luton, England
- Died: 30 June 2012 (aged 81); Clapham, England
- Occupation: Actor
- Notable work: Doctor Who

David Alec Webb (6 March 1931 – 30 June 2012) was a British actor and anti-censorship campaigner.

== Early life ==
Webb was born in Luton, the second child and only son of Alec Webb, and attended Luton Grammar School from 1942 to 1950. He completed his National Service from 1950 to 1952, and trained at the Royal Academy of Dramatic Art from 1952 to 1954.

== Career ==
In 1954 he joined the York Repertory Company, in 1955 the Bromley Repertory Company, and from 1955 to 1956 he toured in the play Love From Judy. He worked in television from the late 1950s onwards appearing in scores of programmes including Emergency Ward 10, Dixon of Dock Green, and Doctor Who, among many others. He featured briefly in Battle of Britain as an unnamed RAF officer.

== NCROPA ==
In April 1976, he set up the anti-censorship pressure group, the National Campaign for the Repeal of the 1959 Obscene Publications Act; this was later amended to National Campaign for the Reform of the Obscene Publications Acts (NCROPA).

NCROPA was very active from its inception through the 1980s, and in 1983 Webb stood as the anti-censorship candidate against the incumbent Prime Minister Margaret Thatcher in her Finchley constituency. He was also a member of the Campaign Against Censorship. By the late 1990s, NCROPA was effectively moribund, and in December 2014, NCROPA was formally merged with the CAC.

== Personal life ==
David Webb was unmarried. He was a secular humanist.

== Death ==
He died at Trinity Hospice, Clapham, and was cremated at Mortlake Crematorium on 17 July 2012.
