= The Class of Miss MacMichael =

1978 British film by Silvio Narizzano

- Theatrical release poster
- Directed by: Silvio Narizzano
- Written by: Judd Bernard
- Produced by: Judd Bernard
- Starring: Glenda Jackson; Oliver Reed; Michael Murphy; Rosalind Cash; John Standing
- Cinematography: Alex Thomson
- Edited by: Max Benedict
- Music by: Stanley Myers
- Production companies: Brut Productions; Kettledrum Films
- Distributed by: Gala Film Distributors
- Release dates: 28 December 1978 (Australia); 27 January 1979 (USA)
- Running time: 94 minutes
- Country: United Kingdom
- Language: English

The Class of Miss MacMichael is a 1978 British comedy drama film directed by Silvio Narizzano, and starring Glenda Jackson, Oliver Reed, and Michael Murphy. It was written by Judd Bernard based on the 1978 novel of the same name by Sandy Hutson.

== Plot ==
The film depicts the attempts of an idealistic teacher, Miss MacMichael, to inspire her pupils in an inner-city London school. While trying to help the teens she works with, she also must fight the ultra authoritarian headmaster, Mr Sutton.

== Cast ==
- Glenda Jackson as Conor MacMichael
- Oliver Reed as Terence Sutton
- Michael Murphy as Martin West
- Rosalind Cash as Una Ferrar
- John Standing as Charles Fairbrother
- Phil Daniels as Stewart
- Peta Bernard as Mabel
- Mavis Pugh as Mrs. Barnett
- Ian Thompson as Mr. Bowden
- Patsy Byrne as Mrs. Green
- Judy Wiles as Miss Eccles
- Pamela Manson as Mrs. Bellrind
- Dierdre Forrest as Dierdre
- Perry Benson as Timmy
- Riba Akabusi as Gaylord
- Patrick Murray as Boysie
- Danielle Corgan as Tina
- Sharon Fussey as Belinda
- Tony London as Adam
- David Elmon as Boris
- Constantine Gregory as Maj. Brady (as Constantin de Goguel)
- Thomas Baptiste as Tour Visitor
- Boliver as Boliver

== Production ==
Although the film was shot in Britain it was financed entirely from the United States which the director thought was "disgraceful".

== Reception ==
The Monthly Film Bulletin wrote: "A curious throwback to the days of The Blackboard Jungle and, closer to home, To Sir with Love, which fails to make much of a case, in its earnest liberal fashion, for the way society shapes its juvenile delinquents. Reformist in inspiration, inappropriate in interpretation (Oliver Reed plays Sutton the headmaster as though he were a music-hall character), and inexplicable in casting (it is the most unlikely vehicle yet for Glenda Jackson), the film simply limps from one clumsy exhibition of delinquency to the next. It does, however, give work to a fair number of young black actors, which is not an everyday occurrence, and one performance in particular stands out: Phil Daniels as the lanky adolescent with the prurient eye whom Miss MacMichael designates to give the functionaries of the school board an eye-opening tour of the premises' seedier nooks and crannied."

Janet Maslin in the New York Times wrote, "Brut Productions, which once brought you Glenda Jackson in A Touch of Class (1973), this time presents her in circumstances that are decidedly déclassé ... Miss Jackson does nothing here that she hasn't done better elsewhere."

Variety criticized the film as, "Treading the usual characterizations and situations", but added, "Though predictable, and the script serviceable for this oft-treated theme, with direction average, it has Glenda Jackson adding her presence to the part of a dedicated teacher who eschews a second marriage to stay with her impossible charges."

Time Out wrote: "Reed, as the neo-fascist headmaster of a school for delinquents, parodies his boorish film persona to the point of farce, alternately strutting around like a boiled turkey or oiling his way with the school's visitors, while Jackson goes at her role of committed teacher/lone befriender of kids with jaw-forward heartiness. Add to this conflict in styles the film's confused intentions – black comedy, the horrific realities of reform schools, a sentimental belief that understanding will overcome – and you have a mess."

Leslie Halliwell said: "The Blackboard Jungle lives on, very boringly."

In The Radio Times Guide to Films Tom Hutchinson gave the film 3/5 stars, writing: "This chalkface bungle features two watchable, hyperactive performances by Glenda Jackson and Oliver Reed. ... There's more sexual permissiveness unleashed here than in other teenage dramas of the time but, when Jackson and Reed are absent, this doesn't make it any more watchable."
