= Judd Bernard =

American film producer and screenwriter (1927–2022)

Judd Bernard (born Sherman Bernard Goldberg; June 20, 1927 – January 25, 2022) was an American film producer and screenwriter. Bernard died on January 25, 2022, at the age of 94.

== Filmography ==
Producer

- Blood Red (1989)
- The Class of Miss MacMichael (1978)
- Inside Out (1975)
- The Marseille Contract (1974)
- The Man Who Had Power Over Women (1970)
- Deep End (1970)
- Negatives (1968)
- Blue (1968)
- Fade-In (1968)
- Point Blank (1967)
- Double Trouble (1967)

Writer

- The Class of Miss MacMichael (1978)
- Inside Out (1975)
- The Marseille Contract (1974)
