= Campaign Against Censorship =

UK pressure group

The Campaign Against Censorship (CAC) is a non-party political pressure group that opposes censorship and promotes freedom of expression in the United Kingdom. The group is based in Fareham, England. It was formerly named the Defence of Literature and the Arts Society (DLAS). It was founded in 1968 with the publisher John Calder as a prime mover behind it as a direct result of the Last Exit to Brooklyn novel publication trial. In 1976 it sent a delegation to see the Home Secretary to argue that "films are subject to unjust discrimination and should be placed on the same legal basis as books and plays as far as content is concerned", and that "the common law offences on indecency should come to an end".

In 1983, the group was relaunched as the Campaign Against Censorship.

== Guiding principles ==
The guiding principles of the Campaign are:

1. The right to obtain and impart knowledge
2. Freedom from censorship
3. Freedom for creative artists to present their perceptions, interpretations and ideas
4. Freedom from discrimination on the grounds of sex, sexual orientation, race, politics or religion.

== Officers ==
Officers of the CAC are Edward Goodman (Chair) a lawyer and former local councillor, Dr Nigel Meek (Publications and Website Officer) and Mary Hayward (Hon. Secretary/Treasurer).

== Informal links ==
Campaign Against Censorship have informal links with Liberty, Backlash and the Open Rights Group. In recent years, the CAC has also made formal submissions to the Deputy Prime Minister's 2010 Law Review and the 2013 proposals on press regulation. In December 2014, CAC absorbed the remnant of the late David Webb's National Campaign for the Reform of the Obscene Publications Acts.

== Bibliography ==
- Sutherland, John (1983). Offensive Literature: Decensorship in Britain, 1960-1982. Rowman & Littlefield. ISBN 9780389203544.
