= Bernice Adams =

English actress

Bernice Adams (born August 1949) is an English stage and television actress.

The London-born Adams studied at a dancing school for three years from age thirteen. She went on to work on stage in pantomime, variety shows and cabaret. Late in the 1950s she appeared in West End musicals including The Most Happy Fella, Gentlemen Prefer Blondes, Promises, Promises, Gypsy, Sweet Charity, and the Dad's Army.

On television she appeared in It Ain't Half Hot Mum, Dad's Army and Are You Being Served? In the 1980s Adams gave up acting and became a production manager for a dance and theatre company, eventually relocating to France. She now lives in Monte Carlo.
