= Pamela Manson =

British actress (1928–1988)

Pamela Manson in The Fall and Rise of Reginald Perrin (1976)

Pamela Manson (30 September 1928 – 19 March 1988) was a British actress who in her 30–year career on film, television and stage is best known for playing comedy roles. She was also a political activist who was a member of Equity, and the International Committee for Artists' Freedom, and a committee member of the National Campaign for the Reform of the Obscene Publications Acts.

== Early years ==
Born as Pamela J. Cowan, and originally from Leeds, before turning to an acting career she worked as a secretary on the News Chronicle and at one time also worked as a public relations officer in the fashion industry and managed theatrical artists for a period.

== Acting career ==
Manson's first acting role was in 1952 following which she had a long career in the theatre. Breaking into television, she made appearances as the Canteen Server/Bertha in four episodes of Hancock's Half Hour (1957–1959), Rita/Irma Stevens in Dixon of Dock Green (1961–1962), Mrs. Phillips in Z-Cars (1965), René Tanner in Emergency – Ward 10 (1966), Maggie in All Gas and Gaiters (1967), Mrs. Lloyd in Champion House (1967–1968), Mrs. Levy in Alexander the Greatest (1971), the Large Brim with Fruit in Are You Being Served? (1973), Sykes (1973), the NAAFI Girl in the We Know Our Onions episode of Dad's Army (1973), Sheila in Second Time Around (1974), Sally in The Good Life (1975), Sylvia in Bar Mitzvah Boy (1976), Barmaid in The Fall and Rise of Reginald Perrin (1976), Jackanory (1977), Molly in The Professionals (1978), and Sybil Nunn in Sorry, I'm A Stranger Here Myself (1981–1982), Landlady in The Chinese Detective (1982), Mavis in Hi-de-Hi! (1984), Mrs. Ivan in The Life and Loves of a She-Devil (1986) and the Fairy Godmother in The Growing Pains of Adrian Mole (1987), among other roles. She also appeared with Peter Sellers.

Her film roles included Room at the Top (1959), Greek Brothel Keeper in On the Game (1974) and Mrs. Bellrind in The Class of Miss MacMichael (1978), while her stage appearances included A Penny for Bread at the Almost Free Theatre as well as seasons at the Chichester Festival Theatre and the Mermaid Theatre.

== Other activities ==
As an active member of the actors' union Equity, she was a member of the International Committee for Artists' Freedom that campaigned in late 1987 when 77 of Chile's leading actors were threatened with death if they refused to leave their country. As an activist in the Soviet Jewry Campaign she was also involved in the campaign to allow the ballet dancer Valery Panov and his wife Galina to leave Russia in 1974. Manson was also a committee member of the National Campaign for the Reform of the Obscene Publications Acts (NCROPA) and had been the Chairman of the Redcliffe Ward Chelsea Labour Party.

With her friend, the actress Diane Hart, she set up a ladies' underwear business in west London. In 1961 the two went to the Soviet Union where they thought their products would be in demand. Manson explained "We thought it was about time someone made the Russian women figure-conscious. If they wear corsets at all, which we doubt, they're probably ones which came out of the Ark. So we're taking our top-selling line, Beatnix, and lots of older models which were in fashion here some years ago. Frankly, we think they will be a better sell with the Russians than modern, snazzy, sexy little garments."

== Personal life and death ==
In 1949, she married Louis Manson, later the Chairman of Cope Allman International, in Kensington; they had two sons and two daughters. The marriage was later dissolved.

Manson lived in Kensington and died in London aged 59, following a sudden illness and heart surgery. She was survived by her four children.

== Partial filmography ==
- Room at the Top (1959) – Thespians Member (uncredited)
- On the Game (1974) – Greek Brothel Keeper
- The Class of Miss MacMichael (1978) – Mrs. Bellrind
