= Diana Lambert =

British actress (1931–1995)

Diana Lambert (1931–1995) was a British actress.

She was born on 17 September 1931 in Kensington, London, England as Diana Charlotte Herrmann. She was an actress, known for The Nun's Story (1959), Séance on a Wet Afternoon (1964) and Vicky's First Ball (1956). She played Anna in episode 28 of The Adventures of William Tell, The Avenger (1959).

Lambert was also in Mrs Thursday, The Famous Five and appeared in the BBC department store sitcom Are You Being Served? three times (1976 and 1985), once playing a customer and the other two playing Captain Peacock's long suffering, battle axe wife.

She died in Kensington, London in 1995 aged 63.
