= List of Till Death Us Do Part episodes =

This is an episode list for the BBC show sitcom Till Death Us Do Part by Johnny Speight, broadcast between 22 July 1965 and 3 April 1992, including Till Death... and In Sickness and in Health.

== Series overview ==
Series	Series	Episodes	Originally released		
Series	Series	Episodes	First released	Last released	Network
Till Death Us Do Part	Pilot		22 July 1965		BBC1
Till Death Us Do Part	1	7	6 June 1966	1 August 1966	BBC1
Till Death Us Do Part	2	11	26 December 1966	27 March 1967	BBC1
Till Death Us Do Part	3	7	5 January 1968	16 February 1968	BBC1
Till Death Us Do Part	S	Special	18 June 1970		BBC1
Till Death Us Do Part	4	6	13 September 1972	25 October 1972	BBC1
Till Death Us Do Part	4	Special	26 December 1972		BBC1
Till Death Us Do Part	5	7	2 January 1974	28 February 1974	BBC1
Till Death Us Do Part	6	Special	31 December 1974		BBC1
Till Death Us Do Part	6	6	8 January 1975	12 February 1975	BBC1
Till Death Us Do Part	7	6	5 November 1975	17 December 1975	BBC1
Till Death...	1	6	22 May 1981	3 July 1981	ITV
In Sickness and in Health	1	6	1 September 1985	13 October 1985	BBC1
In Sickness and in Health	1	Special	26 December 1985		BBC1
In Sickness and in Health	2	6	4 September 1986	9 October 1986	BBC1
In Sickness and in Health	2	Special	23 December 1986		BBC1
In Sickness and in Health	3	6	22 October 1987	26 November 1987	BBC1
In Sickness and in Health	3	Special	25 December 1987		BBC1
In Sickness and in Health	4	7	7 September 1989	19 October 1989	BBC1
In Sickness and in Health	4	Special	25 December 1989		BBC1
In Sickness and in Health	5	10	1 September 1990	3 November 1990	BBC1
In Sickness and in Health	5	Special	30 December 1990		BBC1
In Sickness and in Health	6	7	21 February 1992	3 April 1992	BBC1

== Till Death Us Do Part ==
Earlier episodes were produced in black-and-white; all episodes after Series 3 are in colour. The original videotapes of nearly all episodes prior to Series 4 were wiped, although complete or partial telerecordings of some episodes have been recovered. Recordings exist of all episodes from Series 4 and onwards.

=== Pilot episode ===
No.	Title	Original release date
1	"Till Death Us Do Part"	22 July 1965
The only way that Mike can take out a deposit on a new home is to take out a life insurance policy on Alf. Notes: Aired as an episode of Comedy Playhouse. Only an excerpt is known to exist. Gretchen Franklin plays Else.

=== Series 1 ===
No. overall	No. in series	Title	Original release date
2	1	"Arguments, Arguments..."	6 June 1966
Incensed by Mike's comments about his home, Alf takes himself off to the pub to drown his sorrows. Note: This episode was missing from the BBC Archives, until a recording was found in 2002. This episode was included as an extra on The Complete 1974 Series DVD.
3	2	"Hair Raising! (handwritten as "Baldhead" on the camera script)"	13 June 1966
An argument about clothes turns into one about Alf's baldness, if which he is particularly sensitive. After being caught trying on one of Rita's wigs he resorts to a fearsome concoction to try to induce his hair to grow. Note: Only an off-air audio recording exists.
4	3	"A House With Love in It"	20 June 1966
Mike tries to help Alf out when he forgets his 25th wedding anniversary — but no good deed goes unpunished!
5	4	"Intolerance"	27 June 1966
After a bit of fracas at the European Cup Winners Cup, Alf returns home with two black eyes and no voice. Notes: This episode was missing from the BBC Archives, until a recording was found in 2016. There are guest appearances of Ian St John and Willie Stevenson, both of Liverpool FC.
6	5	"Two Toilets? ... That's Posh"	4 July 1966
Mike and Rita have their heart set on their own house — the only problem is that they can't afford one. While Alf is having a bath in the kitchen, he overhears Mike talking to an estate agent about selling Alf's house to use as a deposit for a new one. Note: Only an off-air audio recording exists.
7	6	"From Liverpool with Love"	18 July 1966
Alf opens one of Mike's letters and is horrified to discover that Mike's parents are coming to visit — one of whom is a devout catholic while the other is a compulsive liar. Things turn worse when Alf finds out they intend to stay for a week Note: Only an off-air audio recording exists.
8	7	"Claustrophobia"	1 August 1966
Alf gets the hump during a family holiday in the West Country. The journey is a nightmare but it is the ramshackle holiday cottage and utter desolation of its location that sends him straight to the nearest pub. Note: Only an off-air audio recording exists.

=== Series 2 ===
No. overall	No. in series	Title	Original release date
9	1	"Peace and Goodwill"	26 December 1966
Christmas in the Garnett household is no less fraught than any other time of year. Note: This episode only existed in the archive in an incomplete form until the full episode was returned in 2009.
10	2	"Sex Before Marriage"	2 January 1967
Alf breaks the monotony of wallpapering the living room by railing against the permissive society. The whole world has obviously gone sex mad — even the clergy are getting in on the act! Note: This episode resurfaced in 2017 in the form of a 16mm film print struck for overseas sales. The recovered print of Sex Before Marriage was screened at the BFI's annual Missing Believed Wiped event in December 2017 and was presented for the first time on DVD.
11	3	"I Can Give It Up Any Time I Like"	9 January 1967
Mike's hacking smoker's cough enrages Alf, but Mike turns the tables with a bet to see who can stop smoking the longest. Painted into a corner, Alf has no choice other than to suffer the pangs of nicotine withdrawal. Note: This episode no longer exists in the archive and is an off-air audio made during transmission. It is missing several minutes of dialogue-free material, which do not impact on the storyline.
12	4	"The Bulldog Breed"	16 January 1967
An attempt by Mike to appeal to Alf's good side for a donation towards medical aid to Vietnam comes a cropper as Alf doesn't have a good side. A rant about war ensues — only interrupted when a belligerent driver parks his huge lorry outside the Garnett's house. Note: This episode no longer exists in the archive and is an off-air audio made during transmission.
13	5	"Caviare on the Dole (aka Caviar on the Dole)"	23 January 1967
Mike is on the dole again, but isn't downhearted as the recently increased weekly benefits allow him to live a life of luxury until the next job comes along. Needless to say, Alf is enraged. Note: This episode no longer exists in the archive and is an off-air audio made during transmission.
14	6	"A Woman's Place Is in the Home"	30 January 1967
Arriving home to an empty house and a burnt dinner, Alf is appalled to find out that — not only has everyone else been enjoying a few hours at the pictures — but that they've been to the chip shop and not got him anything to eat. Note: This episode no longer exists in the archive and is an off-air audio made during transmission.
15	7	"A Wapping Mythology (The Workers' King)"	6 February 1967
Alf tells tall stories about his dad's personal friendship with the Duke of Windsor — though Mike's scorn is tempered when Alf receives two free tickets to the impending West Ham v Liverpool game. Note: This episode no longer exists in the archive and is an off-air audio made during transmission.
16	8	"In Sickness and in Health"	13 February 1967
Alf is ill in bed while everyone else is downstairs enjoying the television. A visit from the decrepit Dr Kelly results in a verdict of "nothing wrong with you", so Alf sets off in search of a second opinion. Note: Missing for many years, this episode was returned to the archive in 2009.
17	9	"State Visit"	20 February 1967
Alf is enraged to learn that Harold Wilson is to play host to the Russian president. Even worse, he reads that the Queen will have to meet this Bolshevik heathen - something that ought not to happen to someone who is descended from God. Note: Missing for many years, this episode was returned to the archive in 2009.
18	10	"Alf's Dilemma (aka Cleaning Up TV)"	27 February 1967
Alf lectures everyone on the benefits of Mary Whitehouse's edifying new book — a rhapsody that is that is abruptly interrupted when the diarrhoea from which he's suffering flares up. At that point he discovers that their loo isn't working due to Else's tea leaves... Note: Twenty minutes of sound and image were returned to the archive in 1997 — with three sections missing from the complete episode. With the aid of an off-air audio recording, this episode has been reconstructed to its full running time.
19	11	"Till Closing Time Us Do Part: A Bank Holiday Knees-up with the Garnett family"	27 March 1967
Alf finds his local pub full of celebrities — and promptly insults them all!

=== Series 3 ===
No. overall	No. in series	Title	Original release date
20	1	"The Phone"	5 January 1968
Alf wins seventeen quid on the horses only to find out that Mike couldn't place the bet as the phone box was occupied. He is soft-soaped into believing that getting a telephone installed is in his own best interests, but he soon finds out it is anything but. Note: Missing from the archive until 2023, however in 2001 this episode was recovered by Martin Loach from an off-air recording on a Phillips EL3400 open-reel video tape. Due to oxide shedding from the tape it was recovered in small sections which were then reassembled into the full episode.
21	2	"The Blood Donor"	12 January 1968
Sensing cowardice, Mike tries to talk Alf into giving blood. Despite Alf's concern about who his blood would be given to, he's finally convinced to do It on a fiver bob bet.
22	3	"Monopoly"	19 January 1968
Else's sloth-like behaviour at the Monopoly board drives Alf into a New Year's Eve rage. Venting his spleen on transcendentalism and religion he's momentarily distracted by the tray of water that Else puts down for the mice... Note: Missing from the archive for over fifty years, a copy was found in 2023.
23	4	"The Funeral"	26 January 1968
Mike fails to see the point in turning off the television as a mark of respect when a neighbour dies — especially as Alf never liked her in the first place and West Ham are on the box later that evening. Note: This episode no longer exists in the archive and is an off-air audio recording made during transmission.
24	5	"Football (aka The Football)"	2 February 1968
The vicar foolishly asks Alf to coach the local kids' football team. When Mike advises that one of the tearaways could become a professional, Alf decides that West Ham FC must get first refusal. Note: This episode no longer exists in the archive and is an off-air audio recording made during transmission.
25	6	"The Dog (aka The Puppy)"	9 February 1968
A drunken Alf surprises everyone by bringing home a dog the he has just bought from a man in the pub. Despite telling everyone tall tales about his Dad's dog-rearing skills, it is soon pretty clear that Alf has not got the first clue how to handle one himself. Note: This episode no longer exists in the archive and is an off-air audio recording made during transmission.
26	7	"Aunt Maud"	16 February 1968
Dr Kelly prescribes bed rest for a poorly Else, so her sister Maud moves in to look after things. When Alf makes his contempt more than plain, he finds out he has got to fend for himself or starve. Note: Missing from the archive until 2023, however in 2001 this episode was recovered by Martin Loach from an off-air recording on a Phillips EL3400 open-reel video tape. It is missing the first few minutes, but with the aid of an off-air audio recording this episode has been reconstructed to its full running time. The end credits are also missing but this has been left 'as is'.

=== Surviving Episodes from 1965–1968 ===
Series	Episode	Title	Airdate	Notes
1	1	Arguments, Arguments...	6 June 1966	Found in 2002
1	3	A House with Love in It	20 June 1966	
1	4	Intolerance	11 July 1966	Found in August 2016
2	1	Peace and Goodwill	26 December 1966	Found in 2009
2	2	Sex Before Marriage	2 January 1967	Found in October 2017
2	8	In Sickness and In Health	13 February 1967	Found in 2009
2	9	State Visit	20 February 1967	Found in 2009
2	10	Alf's Dilemma (a.k.a. Cleaning Up TV)	27 February 1967	Found in 1997
2	11	Till Closing Time Do Us Part	27 March 1967	
3	1	The Phone	5 January 1968	A low-quality, domestic recording exists
3	2	The Blood Donor	12 January 1968	
3	3	Monopoly	19 January 1968	Found in 2023
3	7	Aunt Maud	16 February 1968	Found in 2023

=== Election special ===
No.	Title	Original release date
27	"The Campaign's Over (a.k.a. Up the Polls)"	18 June 1970
It is General Election night, and Alf is discussing the state of the nation, immigration, the Common Market, and the World Cup. Note: First episode produced in colour. A low-quality, 25 minute domestic black-and-white video recording (missing the first 5 minutes) exists, as well as a complete off-air audio recording and 27 seconds of colour footage.

=== Series 4 ===
This series was released on DVD in the UK as The Complete 1972 Series by Network.

No. overall	No. in series	Title	Original release date
28	1	"To Garnett A Grandson (aka To Garnett — a Grandson)"	13 September 1972
Alf's happy to be a granddad — though he's considerably less so when he hears about the christening!
29	2	"Pigeon Fancier (aka The Bird Fancier)"	20 September 1972
Alf's in the money; celebrating at the pub he meets a friend and thinks he has a sure-fire way to make some more. Note: This episode included in this set is an early, extended edit which runs two minutes longer than the transmitted version. It also features the intended titles for series four, which were ultimately replaced prior to transmission.
30	3	"Holiday in Bournemouth (aka Women's Lib and Bournemouth)"	27 September 1972
As the Garnett family set out for Bournemouth after a raging argument about Women's Lib, Alf isn't really in a holiday mood.
31	4	"Dock Pilfering (aka If We Want a Proper Democracy Here We've Got to Start Shooting a Few People)"	11 October 1972
Alf lectures Mike on the benefits of inflation before falling into an argument over whether Jesus was Labour or Conservative.
32	5	"Up The Hammers (aka Up the 'Ammers)"	18 October 1972
Alf wants his grandson to play for his beloved West Ham. He encounters some firm resistance.
33	6	"Alf's Broken Leg"	25 October 1972
Alf, in a wheelchair with a broken leg, on overpopulation: "Let's have a war and get rid of some of your bloody youth!" Guest: Joan Sims
Christmas Special (1972)
34	—	"Jesus Christ Superstar"	26 December 1972
Guest: Paul Nicholas

=== Series 5 ===
This series was released on DVD in the UK as The Complete 1974 Series by Network.

No. overall	No. in series	Title	Original release date
35	1	"TV Licence"	2 January 1974
Alf feels he doesn't need a TV licence if he only gets commercial television. Guest: Gorden Kaye
36	2	"The Royal Wedding"	9 January 1974
Alf wants to throw a street party for the royal wedding of Princess Anne and Mark Phillips. Guest: Joan Sims Note: The original transmission version of this episode no longer exists and is from an off-air recording.
37	3	"Strikes and Blackouts"	23 January 1974
There's a power cut – isn't there?
38	4	"Three Day Week (a.k.a. Else's Three Day Week)"	30 January 1974
Else begins her own three-day week so there's no dinner for Alf.
39	5	"Gran's Watch"	5 February 1974
Gran appears to be dying, so she won't need her late husband's gold watch now, will she? Guest: Joan Sims
40	6	"Party Night (a.k.a. The Demon Drink)"	13 February 1974
Alf likes a drink, but isn't amused when the women are skinful. Guests: Joan Sims, Roy Kinnear, Rita Webb and Adrienne Posta
41	7	"Paki-Paddy"	28 February 1974
Alf shows his prejudice against immigrants, one of whom moves next door. Guest: Spike Milligan as "Paki-Paddy"

=== Series 6 ===
No. overall	No. in series	Title	Original release date
Christmas Special (1974)
42	—	"Outback Bound"	31 December 1974
Else's sister Maud has fallen ill and Else leaves for Australia to care for her. Alf tries to stop her from going but Else leaves anyway.
Series
43	1	"Phone Call to Else"	8 January 1975
Alf is missing Else who is still away in Australia and Rita and Mike convince him to make a long-distance phone call to her. But Else answers and lays the phone down to answer the doorbell, the time clicks away and the bill grows. Note: Dandy Nichols' last appearance as Else Garnett on the series.
44	2	"Marital Bliss"	15 January 1975
Min and Bert Reed from next door have a fight and split up.
45	3	"Wedgie Ben"	22 January 1975
Alf, the Reads and the Rawlins get involved in the inevitable political argument. Alf regards long term Labour minister Anthony Wedgewood Benn a fraud because he has a title – which he will later renounce – and lives in a wealthy Conservative neighbourhood. Mike, however, turns the tables on his father-in-law by pointing out that Alf is a Conservative voter living in a far from wealthy Labour stronghold.
46	4	"The Wake"	29 January 1975
Min's mother has died and everybody has returned from the funeral though Min is adamant that her mother will be reincarnated as a blackbird. Having made sure that he has not already learnt of its outcome Alf settles down to watch the Ali-Foreman fight on TV but there are, of course, complications.
47	5	"Christmas Club Books"	5 February 1975
Alf has been charged to look after the Christmas club subscriptions at the local pub. However maths is not his strong point and he has trouble balancing the books. This in turn leads to the regulars suspecting that, instead of intending to pay them out, he is keeping the cash to join his wife in Oz and an argument breaks out, though he is almost importuned by a gay man.
48	6	"The Letter"	12 February 1975
Alf is heartbroken to learn Else isn't returning to England and has written a letter confirming it to Rita.

=== Series 7 ===
No. overall	No. in series	Title	Original release date
49	1	"Moving in With Min"	5 November 1975
With it clear Else isn't returning, Alf considers the sale of the house and moving in with Min and Bert next door.
50	2	"Min the Housekeeper"	12 November 1975
Min goes on strike as a housekeeper.
51	3	"Drunk in Charge of a Bicycle"	19 November 1975
Alf and Bert go out for the day and Alf gets drunk and arrested for riding a bicycle intoxicated.
52	4	"The Window"	26 November 1975
While cleaning the windows, Alf gets stuck on the ledge. Guest: Pat Coombs
53	5	"A Hole in One"	3 December 1975
Alf and Bert head off to go golfing.
54	6	"Unemployment"	17 December 1975
Alf returns home after being laid off work to find a surprise birthday party with friends and family. Arguments about politics, Catholics and the Irish fill the night. A near fight between Alf and neighbour Wally Carry is interrupted when a telegram arrives from Else in Australia asking for a divorce. Guests: Joan Sims, Pat Coombs and Hugh Lloyd

== Till Death... ==
=== Series 1 (Series 8) ===
No. overall	No. in series	Title	Original release date
55	1	"Episode 1"	22 May 1981
Alf, Else and Min explore Eastbourne – including the Pier, the Pier Arcade and the Queen's Hotel.
56	2	"Episode 2"	29 May 1981
Rita and her son, Michael, visit Alf, Else and Min. Whilst on a walk, Alf claims that he was mugged by one of "Michael's sort", when in fact the group of boys were only helping him across the road.
57	3	"Episode 3"	5 June 1981
Alf comes home drunk after watching a West Ham football game and ends up sleeping on the floor in the hall. In the morning, he finds that Else hasn't cooked him any breakfast – and he's livid.
58	4	"Episode 4"	19 June 1981
Alf answers their transport problems by acquiring a very old motorbike and sidecar – however, he hasn't got a licence for it.
59	5	"Episode 5"	26 June 1981
The television is broken.
60	6	"Episode 6"	3 July 1981
Alf is taken ill with liver complaints, after spending the night before drinking.

== In Sickness and in Health ==
=== Series 1 (Series 9) ===
No. overall	No. in series	Title	Original release date
61	1	"Episode 1"	1 September 1985
The Garnetts are back in London. Else is severely arthritic and can barely walk and Alf extols the joys of the wheelchair has got her – until he has to push her around in it. With so many cars parked on the pavement he uses the middle of the road, incurring a motorist's wrath. The chair does come in handy for getting him on the front row at football matches though his response to a home win reveals that he is using it fraudulently.
62	2	"Episode 2"	8 September 1985
Having complained about his failing eyesight – and just about everything else – Alf takes his wife out in her wheelchair and buys her an ice cream cornet whilst avoiding giving money to the vicar. However his poor sight proves his undoing when he accidentally goes into a ladies' toilet and is arrested as a sex pest.
63	3	"Episode 3"	15 September 1985
Having scrubbed the hall floor and disapproved of Else's using the milkman to place her bets, Alf feels that they are entitled to a home help but manages to antagonise three women in succession. Returning from the pub he finds that the latest is Winston, an extremely flamboyant gay black man who will clearly take no nonsense from him.
64	4	"Episode 4"	29 September 1985
Alf tries the patience of good-natured Fred Johnson and his wife from next door by using their phone to make a very long-winded long-distance call to Rita. After expounding upon funerals in the pub, Alf repays Fred by buying him so many drinks he falls over, but Alf's homeward progress pushing Else in her wheelchair also ends in drunken calamity.
65	5	"Episode 5"	6 October 1985
Rita comes to visit and no sooner is she through the door than Alf argues with her about Else. After Alf has criticised Margaret Thatcher, claiming that no woman should be prime minister, Else and Rita gang up against him with Winston, who brings an equally camp friend home to throw a party for Rita. Alf is given extremely strong drink so that, whilst the others continue carousing, he passes out.
66	6	"Episode 6"	13 October 1985
Tired of pushing Else around in her chair Alf feels she should have an electric scooter but they cost two and a half grand and the woman at Social Security tells Alf that, as long as he is around to push, Else is ineligible. Taking an idea from some kids with a go-kart Alf adds jet propulsion to the chair, which goes out of control, foiling a bank robbery and landing him in hospital. He is declared a hero but, following Winston's view that the robbers' accomplices may be out to get him, he decides to remain anonymous.
Christmas Special (1985)
67	—	"Untitled"	26 December 1985
Rita has come to stay but announces her intention to go back home on Christmas Eve. In order to persuade her to stay and help him look after Else, Alf falls off a ladder and claims to have injured his leg. However, whilst Rita does stay, the knees up at the Christmas Day party goes so well that Alf's enthusiastic participation soon exposes his supposedly bad leg as nothing more than a ruse.

=== Series 2 (Series 10) ===
No. overall	No. in series	Title	Original release date
68	1	"Episode 1"	4 September 1986
Else has died and Alf and Rita with friends and neighbours including landlady Mrs Hollingbery return from the funeral for the wake. With Else gone his pension will be halved yet the bills remain the same and Mrs Hollingbury surprises everybody by revealing that Alf has finally lost faith in the Conservatives and persuaded her to vote Labour with him at the last election. She also shows her racist side, provoking Rita's displeasure but being calmed down with an ironic kiss from Winston. However, when the mourners leave and he's alone, he breaks down at the sight of her now empty wheelchair.
69	2	"Episode 2"	11 September 1986
When Rita and Winston come in at night making a noise, Mrs. Hollingbery decides to start locking the front door of the flats at 10:30. But can Alf make it back from the pub in time?
70	3	"Episode 3"	18 September 1986
Mrs. Hollingbery's obsession with locking doors takes on new dimensions when she even locks Alf into his own flat but then he needs to go to the toilet. Meanwhile, the shopkeeper wants to call in Else's debts, and the milkman has some news about her gambling.
71	4	"Episode 4"	25 September 1986
Alf gets fed up with everybody having a Sunday roast except him, so he makes his first trip to a supermarket. However, he's forgotten he can't cook.
72	5	"Episode 5"	2 October 1986
Rita buys Alf a second-hand jacket, and when he notices it is covered in medals he uses it to try to gain all sorts of favours under false pretences. He also gets a visit from canvassing politicians.
73	6	"Episode 6"	9 October 1986
Min Reed and her sister visit Alf and end up staying for a few days. This provokes the jealousy of Mrs. Hollingbery who has grown found of Alf without admitting it.
Christmas Special (1986)
74	—	"Untitled"	23 December 1986
Its Alf's first Christmas since Else died, and he is furious when Rita jets off to Spain for a second honeymoon leaving him alone. Note: This is Una Stubbs’s last episode playing Rita.

=== Series 3 (Series 11) ===
No. overall	No. in series	Title	Original release date
75	1	"Episode 1"	22 October 1987
Having got himself a free teas-maid by causing a scene in an electrical shop Alf goes home to open a private letter to Rita, telling her her divorce from Mike has come through. He is overjoyed as he thinks she will move into the spare room and look after him. However she is planning to marry local doctor Thompson so Alf reluctantly is forced to let Winston have the room instead. To compound Alf's joy Fred Johnson has made sure the teas-maid goes off in the night and wakes all the street.
76	2	"Episode 2"	29 October 1987
After holding forth in the pub on how foreigners have brought AIDS to England Alf and his friend Arthur visit a sex shop, where Arthur steals a pornographic magazine but gives it to Alf to mind for him. When Mrs Hollingbery finds it Alf blames it on Winston and tries to have him evicted but Arthur puts his foot in it by turning up at the house asking for his book just as it is being torn up.
77	3	"Episode 3"	5 November 1987
Alf decides to invest in his own phone but quickly finds himself at war with Mrs Hollingbery over its use as she claims ownership as she is the householder. With the phone being cordless they are frequently hiding it from each other and Winston's calls to Jamaica are no help whilst Alf's delight in trying out his new acquisition by ringing everybody he knows leads to friction with Arthur's wife and injury for Fred Johnson.
78	4	"Episode 4"	12 November 1987
Min and Gwenneth pay Alf another visit, Gwenneth as confused as ever as she mistakes Alf for a doctor and takes her skirt off and, in the pub, mistakes Arthur for an old boyfriend. Back at the house the sisters hold a seance which Winston and his boyfriend use to make Alf believe he is possessed by an evil spirit before faking a conversation with God, who persuades Alf to give the women his bed for the night.
79	5	"Episode 5"	19 November 1987
At the local old time dance afternoon Alf is challenged to fight ageing Lothario Fancy Fred by two merry widows who end up fighting each other but Alf has his chance to threaten Fred when Fred parks his van on the pavement outside the house. However, when Alf gets his legs wedged on the window ledge as he tries to clean the window Arthur and Winston see Fred's van as a means of escape. Fred has other ideas though and Alf has a landing of a different sort.
80	6	"Episode 6"	26 November 1987
On a boiling hot summer day Alf goes to the DHSS to complain that he should have had more money in last winter's heating allowance for living in an end terrace but it cuts no ice. Back home he joins his friends watching cricket on television and falls asleep, loudly dreaming that he has been knighted for his services to the game. He wakes up to general derision and the knowledge that he has been exposed for stealing the eggs from next door's hens.
Christmas Special (1987)
81	—	"Untitled"	25 December 1987
Alf is spending Christmas in hospital for a hip replacement but his visitors' scare stories of what could go wrong propel him into fleeing from the ward dressed as a woman – which incurs a drunk's unwanted attention. Back at the house he is outraged when Mrs Hollingbery's sister turns up after his room, being told that he is not expected to live, but all is forgiven when Mrs Hollingbery invites everybody upstairs for a Christmas party. Unfortunately he has forgotten the loose stair rod and ends up back in the hospital.

=== Series 4 (Series 12) ===
No. overall	No. in series	Title	Original release date
82	1	"Episode 1"	7 September 1989
Alf has had his hip operation and Winston has moved out, replaced by his straight cousin Pele. However some things never change, such as Alf's continuing feud with Mrs Hollingbery, particularly as she hogs his television. Things could be about to change, though, as Arthur points out to Alf that he could be a very rich man by marrying the widow and he sets about wooing her.
83	2	"Episode 2"	14 September 1989
Encouraged by Arthur Alf continues to pursue Mrs Hollingbery, even going down on one knee to propose though she wants time to think. After a night in the pub a surprise engagement party is thrown for the still – undecided – couple but when Mrs Hollingbery learns that, as a husband and wife, they could buy the house for twenty thousand pounds when its market value is five times that she is quick to accept.
84	3	"Episode 3"	21 September 1989
Alf prepares a lavish meal for Arthur who has just come up with eight score draws on the football pools. Unfortunately he has won nothing as his stupid wife failed to post the coupon. There is further despondency as Alf realises he may be too old to acquire a mortgage to buy the house and the idea of his adopting Pele, who'll get it for him, does not appeal. Fortunately salvation arrives when Mrs Hollingbery gets a letter from her brother in Australia, who is happy to buy the house for her – providing that he meets and approves of the groom-to-be.
85	4	"Episode 4"	28 September 1989
It is the eve of Alf and Mrs Hollingbery's trip down under – taking Arthur for company. In the pub the Johnsons have one of their increasingly public rows and Alf is not cheered when everybody places a book on whether the plane will crash. Back home he gets into an argument about noise with just about everybody before admitting to himself that he would really rather not go to Australia.
86	5	"Episode 5"	5 October 1989
On the flight to Australia Arthur, Alf and Mrs Hollingbery are nervous passengers though Alf's argument with a steward who forbids him to smoke breaks the monotony. On arrival Alf argues with a man who turns out to be Mrs H's brother Ricky but, back at his house, he bonds with Alf over their shared racism. Neither Alf nor Mrs Hollingbery are happy when they are given a double room and Ricky gets the wrong idea when Alf says he wants to room with Arthur. Note: This episode and the next two were videotaped in Australia by the ABC (Australian Broadcasting Corporation) in a joint production with the BBC.
87	6	"Episode 6"	12 October 1989
The three visitors have a day sight-seeing, starting in a cafe where Alf defends Hitler. After Alf has rowed with a lazy lifeguard over a non-existent drowning victim, the trio take a boat trip and Alf soon discovers that he and his bride-to-be hold differing views on many things. As far as Alf is concerned, one thing is for sure though. Australians are descended from convicts and they are still not to be trusted.
88	7	"Episode 7"	19 October 1989
The sight-seeing continues with Alf having a confrontation with a crocodile and some Aboriginals, who nonetheless get the better of him after he tries to patronise them. Back at Ricky's Alf gets a business proposition from Ricky and his partner Mooney but it is apparent that they have misunderstood Alf's financial position and soon the three Brits are on the plane back home.
Christmas Special (1989)
89	—	"Untitled"	25 December 1989
Facing another Christmas with a frugal dinner Alf cons the vicar into giving him a Christmas hamper but Mrs Hollingbery refuses to accept it because it has been dishonestly obtained. So Alf takes it to the pub to raffle, making sure that most of the slips of paper have his name on them. However he is outwitted at the last minute by the equally devious Bert Luscombe (Guest star Bill Maynard).

=== Series 5 (Series 13) ===
No. overall	No. in series	Title	Original release date
90	1	"Episode 1 - Power Cut"	1 September 1990
As a result of a power cut Alf and Mrs Hollingbery repair to the candle-lit pub where Alf sounds off about Margaret Thatcher, despite her being a Conservative, and a general argument breaks out with Arthur and Fred Johnson about a number of things – including death, the undertaker at the next table unsettling Alf. When he and Mrs Hollingbery return home after the lights have gone back on Alf rails at her for wasting electricity before fusing all the electrics in the house.
91	2	"Episode 2 - Suicide"	8 September 1990
They may be halfway up the aisle but Alf and his bride-to-be are still arguing, especially when she wants to throw out his furniture as being tat. A fake overdose attempt cuts no ice so Alf is off to the pub to talk about suicide, death and heaven – though Fred Johnson, as an atheist, is having none of it. Back home Alf tries another pretend suicide but is diverted when Mrs Hollingbery brings him in a roast dinner and a can of beer – plus more Aspirin in case he runs out.
92	3	"Episode 3 - X-Rays"	15 September 1990
Complaining that Alf is a shabby dresser, Mrs Hollingbery also wants him to take out life insurance in case he goes first. In the pub a discussion on health does anything but allay Mr Carey's fears about getting a hip replacement in view of Alf's horror stories about hospitals. Another row between the Johnsons prompts Alf to surmise that Fred is a poisoner, leading to Mrs Hollingbery getting her own back by pretending to poison Alf.
93	4	"Episode 4 - Window Cleaning"	22 September 1990
Alf decides to earn some money by working for Mrs Carey as a window cleaner. He fails to get any wages but gets lots of free groceries after catching the milkman in a compromising position. Later Arthur wins the jackpot on the fruit machine at the British Legion but he and Alf decide to split it and keep quiet about it. Baffled by the presence of the groceries and informed by Alf that he has no money for her Mrs Hollingbery is not pleased when Fred tells everybody what really happened.
94	5	"Episode 5 - Dogs"	29 September 1990
Alf and Arthur are in the pub recalling old times and Alf is not impressed when Arthur tells him that he was once the local Romeo and the celebrity captain of the juniors football team. He is even less impressed when everybody else who comes in, especially Mrs Hollingbery, are fawning over Arthur and seeking autographs. Alf then gets a job as a dog walker but the two large dogs get him into trouble with an irate housewife and end up injuring him.
95	6	"Episode 6 - Jury"	6 October 1990
Alf is initially nervous when he receives a brown envelope but swells with pride when he sees that it is calling him up for jury service, a fact which causes him to lord it in the pub. However, when Fred tells him of a juror who was hospitalised for sending a man down and he believes he is being followed by a sinister stalker, Alf finds himself besieged in a strange house.
96	7	"Episode 7 - Courtroom"	13 October 1990
As Alf's day as a juror approaches he sounds off in the pub about his views on justice, inevitably inviting opposing comments from Mr Carey, who believes that the system is corrupt and imprisons the innocent and Fred, who, once more frightens him with tales of retribution from aggrieved villains. By the time he takes his place in the jury box – his trousers wrongly ironed by Mrs Hollingbery – Alf has a plan to preserve his anonymity, a false beard.
97	8	"Episode 8 - Bus"	20 October 1990
Alf organizes a pensioners' outing, immediately falling foul of the bus driver as all the passengers have bus passes which delays the start. In the course of the trip Alf almost has a fight with an Irishman, directs all the ladies to use the gents' toilets to prevent queueing and is rewarded with a glimpse of the queen. Come evening all the pensioners are drunk and noisy, which leaves the driver dreading the trip back home.
98	9	"Episode 9 - Storm"	27 October 1990
The happy couple discuss their forthcoming wedding, a marriage of convenience in every sense as they intend to each remain in their own flat and the bride has no desire for sex, despite Alf's boasts about his youthful prowess. That night a terrible storm dislodges a box of money Alf has been hiding in the chimney. To Alf's annoyance Mrs Hollingbery claims half of it.
99	10	"Episode 10 - Wedding"	3 November 1990
After baffling the Catholic priest who will be marrying him to Mrs Hollingbery with thoughts on separate heavens Alf goes on his stag night where his friends have had a whip round for a cheap cutlery set and the bride comes in to take him home whilst he is enjoying himself with the stripper. Next day everybody assembles for the wedding but, on learning that he wants her to 'obey' him Mrs H jilts Alf at the altar, complaining about his cheap skate ways. Fred thinks he has had a lucky escape but Alf disagrees, claiming that he could have been watching West Ham instead.
Christmas Special (1990)
100	—	"Untitled"	30 December 1990
Following the non-wedding the happy couple hold separate receptions with their same sex friends but just before Christmas Mrs Hollingbery goes to confession, the priest telling her that she has wronged Alf and should do penance. To Alf this means cooking and cleaning for him and, to make her feel guilty, pretends he had booked a luxury honeymoon for them. Mrs H however rebels and, when the priest visits to make her do further penance, makes sure she gets her money's worth.

=== Series 6 (Series 14) ===
No. overall	No. in series	Title	Original release date
101	1	"Episode 1"	21 February 1992
A year later and Alf is still living under the same roof as – and bickering with – Mrs Hollingbery, particularly over her scrounging friend Michael. Alf really loses it when the alarm on a car parked outside his house goes off and decides to teach the driver a lesson, though of course it rebounds on him and his efforts to get revenge on the workmen digging a hole outside the house are equally as ineffectual.
102	2	"Episode 2"	28 February 1992
Alf gets a job pushing the wheelchair to deliver papers but, after he has played a prank on an irate householder, a storm blows his papers away so he decides to gain efficiency by hooking his wheelchair to the milk float. Unfortunately he goes careering downhill – into the swimming pool of a black footballer he recently abused. There is reconciliation but a further misadventure with the chair lands him in a removals van on its way to Newcastle.
103	3	"Episode 3"	6 March 1992
After holding forth on moral issues Alf goes to the pub where the big news is that Fred Johnson's wife has left him for her lesbian lover. To make matters worse she intends to move her into the marital home. Alf, of course, blames the French for introducing permissiveness into the country and ends up getting threatened by Mrs Johnson for his pains.
104	4	"Episode 4"	13 March 1992
Mrs Hollingbery is laid up with a bad leg and Alf is not happy having to fend for himself so he makes an angry trip to the doctor. When the doctor comes to visit he finds himself beset by the Careys and Michael wanting advice for their ailments, leading to the doctor himself needing an ambulance. Later Alf takes Mrs Hollingbery out in her wheelchair and witnesses a blessed miracle as she gets up and runs – to the toilet.
105	5	"Episode 5"	20 March 1992
When Alf gets stuck inside the wardrobe he is moving for Mrs Hollingbery he overhears her telling Mrs Carey she only wanted to marry him for his money so he takes all the cash he has been hoarding to the bank. The notes are so old they are no longer legal tender and having accumulated so much undeclared cash might cause problems with the tax office. Fortunately Alf sees a way round such matters.
106	6	"Episode 6"	27 March 1992
Having deposited his wealth in several banks under assumed names Alf makes a hefty withdrawal but comes home to find his furniture has been stolen so he buys more and chains it down. Anxious to know how long he has left he visits a Harley Street doctor who books him into a private clinic, which soon becomes the scene of a good old knees up for Alf and his friends.
107	7	"Episode 7"	3 April 1992
As Alf celebrates his wealth with a new snooker table he takes Fred as a lodger and gets a visit from Min, still amorously pursuing him. He also gets a visit from the bank manager, who has brought the tax man to investigate why Alf is so wealthy. Alf persuades Michael and Fred to impersonate him and explain everything was won in competitions. He nearly gets away with it too.

== Films ==
Title	Original release date
Till Death Us Do Part	12 December 1968
The Alf Garnett Saga	3 August 1972

== Sketches ==
=== Royal Variety Performance ===
The Royal Variety Performance is a televised variety show held annually in the United Kingdom to raise money for the Royal Variety Charity. It is attended by senior members of the British royal family. The evening's performance is presented as a live variety show, usually from a theatre in London and consists of family entertainment that includes comedy, music, dance, magic and other speciality acts. Till Death Us Do Part participated in the 1972 edition.

Title	Original release date
"1972 sketch"	5 November 1972

=== Christmas Night with the Stars ===
Christmas Night with the Stars was a special screened annually on Christmas night, in which the top stars of the BBC appeared in short—typically five- to ten-minute—versions of their programmes. Till Death Us Do Part was among the programmes featured in the 1967 and 1971 specials. No recordings of either of these two segments are known to exist.

Title	Original release date
"1967 sketch"	25 December 1967
Black-and-white; missing
"1971 sketch"	25 December 1971
Colour; missing

=== A Word with Alf ===
A series of 18 short sketches made by Carlton and sporadically aired on UK Gold between 30 November 1997 and 2000. It starred Mitchell, McSharry and Brian Murphy. Titles below taken from VHS release, others unknown.

Sketch titles

- "Ugly Women"
- "Toilet Food"
- "Education"
- "Filming"
- "Libraries"
- "The Dog"
- "Showers"
- "The Wedding"
- "Immigrants"
- "New Labour"
- "Books"

== Stand up shows ==
=== Specials ===
Title	Original release date	Network
"The Thoughts of Chairman Alf at Christmas (On Yer Actual Boxing Day)"	26 December 1980	ITV
ATV stand-up show, which still exists in the archives.
"The Thoughts of Chairman Alf"	1994	BMG Video (not transmitted)
"An Audience with Alf Garnett"	5 April 1997	ITV

=== The Thoughts of Chairman Alf ===
Standup series produced by LWT and transmitted on ITV.

No. in series	Title	Original release date
1	"Episode 1"	23 September 1998
2	"Episode 2"	7 October 1998
3	"Episode 3"	14 October 1998
4	"Episode 4"	21 October 1998
5	"Episode 5"	28 October 1998
6	"Episode 6"	4 November 1998
