= John Clegg (actor) =

British actor (1934–2024)

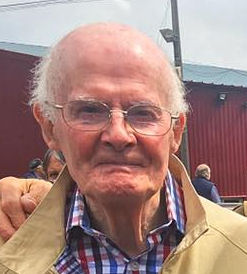
- Clegg in 2018
- Born: John Walter Laurence Clegg; 9 July 1934; Murree, Punjab Province, British India
- Died: 2 August 2024 (aged 90); Chichester, West Sussex, England
- Occupation: Actor
- Years active: 1961–2009
- Notable work: It Ain't Half Hot Mum
- Spouse: Mavis Pugh (m. 1959; died 2006)

John Walter Laurence Clegg (9 July 1934 – 2 August 2024) was an English actor, best known for playing the part of 'La Di Da' Gunner Graham in the BBC sitcom It Ain't Half Hot Mum.

== Early life ==
Clegg was born on 9 July 1934 in Murree, British India (present-day Pakistan) to English parents, John and Barbara (née Bell) Clegg. His father was in the army, a Lieutenant Colonel in Royal Hampshire Regiment who fought in the Second World War, and his mother was a teacher. He had two sisters, Anne and Mary, one older and one younger who both died before him. Clegg's mother wrote pantomime plays for a local drama group, and sometimes cast Clegg to play small roles, starting at age four. When Clegg was eighteen months old, the family moved to Lowestoft, Suffolk, and then to Shawford, a village in Hampshire.

After he and his parents returned to the United Kingdom, Clegg was educated at The Pilgrims' School, Winchester, and Canford School, near Bournemouth. During the Second World War, Clegg's father was badly wounded and was advised to no longer be stationed in the east, and after he was moved to a base in Winchester, John's family followed. When Clegg did National Service he served as a private in the Wiltshire Regiment in Hong Kong, followed by a commission as a second lieutenant in the Royal Hampshire Regiment. Clegg later became a student at the Royal Academy of Dramatic Art (RADA) for two years; Clegg attended RADA at the same time as Peter O'Toole, Albert Finney and Richard Briers.

== Career ==
After leaving RADA, Clegg joined the Watford Palace Theatre Company, where he met Jimmy Perry, who would go on to cast Clegg in the role for which he is best known. It was there that he also met many of his future co-stars, including Michael Knowles, Donald Hewlett and Mavis Pugh (whom he married in 1959). During his time at Watford, Clegg appeared in many performances including farces such as Charley's Aunt and The Happiest Days of Your Life. He also appeared in thrillers such as Gas Light.

In 1973 he was cast in the BBC sitcom It Ain't Half Hot Mum as Gunner Graham, the concert party's pianist. The show ran for eight series and Clegg appeared in all 56 episodes. Despite playing the pianist in the concert party of the show, John could not actually play piano and as a result did not appear in the 1979 stage adaptation of the series; instead, the role was taken up by David Rowley, who was able to play the piano live on stage.

Since It Ain't Half Hot Mum he has made numerous television and film appearances including Dad's Army, Are You Being Served? and Bless This House. Between 2 August and 17 August 1978 Clegg appeared as Clifford Howes in the soap opera Crossroads. In 1979, he made an appearance in the BBC Television Shakespeare production of Measure for Measure, in which he played Froth, the foolish gentleman. In 1982, Clegg made a return to the theatre, co-producing with his wife a one-man show about Rudyard Kipling which achieved success at the Edinburgh Festival Fringe, winning a Fringe Award.

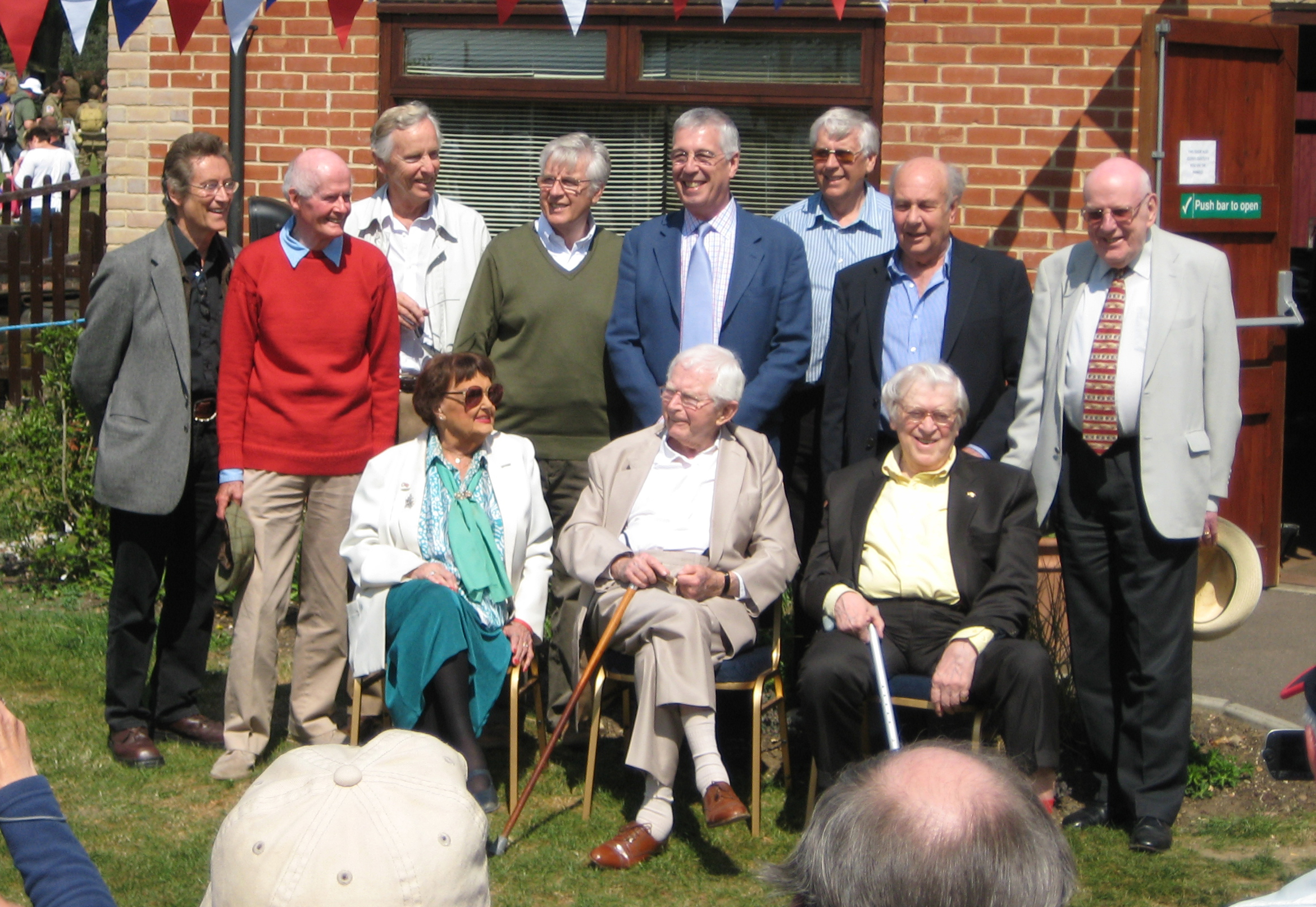
Clegg (second from left) at a 2011 Dad's Army reuinion

In 2001, he had a background role as an elderly man in Bridget Jones's Diary. His last role was in the 2006 film Tommy the Kid, as a police officer but in 2009 appeared in the Dad's Army podcast.

== Personal life ==
Clegg met Mavis Pugh in the mid 1950s and married her in 1959. Pugh appeared in Croft and Perry sitcoms including Dad's Army, It Ain't Half Hot Mum and Hi-de-Hi!, but she is best known for playing Lady Lavender Southwick in You Rang, M'Lord?. Due to the twenty year age gap between Clegg and Pugh many were sceptical as to whether the marriage would last, apart from Jimmy Perry and his wife Gillian. After the wedding there was a whip-round at the theatre which collected enough money to buy what Clegg described in an interview as 'lots of practical things, like sponges and cloths—the most practical things you could imagine.' They had no children.

== Death ==
John Clegg died in a care home in Chichester, West Sussex, on 2 August 2024, at the age of 90. A private funeral was held on 29 August.

== Acting credits ==
=== Film ===
Year	Title	Role
1994	Tom & Viv	Second man
1997	Shooting Fish	Church vicar
1997	Keep the Aspidistra Flying	Mckechnie
2001	Bridget Jones's Diary	Elderly man
2006	Tommy the Kid	Police Officer

=== Television ===
Year	Title	Role	Notes
1961	Dixon of Dock Green	D.C. Greaves	One episode
1962	Dr. Finlay's Casebook	Dr. Mitchell	One episode
1963	Compact	Captain Hicks	One episode
1965	Fothergale Co. Lt.	Shop assistant	One episode
1967	Half a Sixpence	Shop assistant	One episode, uncredited
1968	The Gunpowder Plot	Francis Tresham	
1971	Whack-O!	Proctor	One episode
1972	Father, Dear Father	Vicar	One episode
1972	Lollipop Loves Mr Mole	Taxi Driver	One episode
1972	Dad's Army	Wireless Operator	One episode
1973	Bless This House	Waiter	One episode
1973	Thirty Minutes Worth	Umbrella Salesmen	One episode
1974	My Name Is Harry Worth	Shop assistant	One episode
1974—1975	Are You Being Served?	Customer	Two episodes
1974—1981	It Ain't Half Hot Mum	Gunner Graham	Fifty-six episodes
1975	The Tommy Cooper Hour		One episode
1975	Comedy Playhouse	Gerald	One episode
1975	Hogg's Back	Policeman	Three episodes
1976	Whodunnit?	Brother Paul	One episode
1976	This Is Your Life	Himself	One episode / edition for Windsor Davies
1978	Crossroads	Clifford Howes	Seven episodes
1979	Spooner's Patch	Vicar	Two episodes
1979	Measure for Measure	Froth	
1981	Keep It in the Family	Vicar	One episode
1981	Family Fortunes	Himself	One episode
1982	Summer Festival	Rudyard Kipling	One-man show
1987	Three Up, Two Down	Max	One episode
1989	The Nineteenth Hole	Sam	One episode
1990	You Rang, M'Lord?	Mr. Franklyn	Two episodes
1991	Doctor at the Top	Dinner guest	One episode
1993	Demob	Camera	One episode
1994	Mr. Bean	Calligrapher	One episode
1995	Coogan's Run	Alf	One episode
1995	This Is Your Life	Himself	One episode / edition for David Croft
2003	Death in Holy Orders	Father John Betterton	Two episodes
2009	The Dad's Army Podcast	Himself	One episode
