= Joy Allen =

English actress

- Born: 10 November 1948 (age 77); Werrington, Peterborough, England
- Occupation: Actress

Joy Allen (born 10 November 1948) is an English actress best known for her television appearances.

== Early life ==
Allen was born in Werrington, Cambridgeshire. She trained at the Royal Academy of Dramatic Art.

== Career ==
She has appeared in several television roles including in Dad's Army (as a bus conductress to whom Captain Mainwaring is notably chivalrous), Are You Being Served?, Archie Bunker's Place, Oh, Doctor Beeching! and 'Allo 'Allo!.

== Filmography ==
=== Film ===
Year	Title	Role	Notes
1963	Blind Corner	Dancer	
1979	Night of the Demon	Classmate	

=== Television ===
Year	Title	Role	Notes
1972	Dad's Army	The Clippie	Episode: "A Soldier's Farewell"
1974	Dad's Army	The Lady with the Pram	Episode: "Gorilla Warfare"
1975	Are You Being Served?	Sister	Episode: "Cold Store"
1979	Are You Being Served?	Staff Nurse	Episode: "Strong Stuff This Insurance"
1982	Archie Bunker's Place	Waitress	Episode: "A Blast from the Past"
1983	Archie Bunker's Place	Shirley	3 episodes
1983	Death of an Expert Witness	District Nurse	1 episode
1985	'Allo 'Allo!	Mrs Fairfax	Episode: "The Gâteau from the Château
1997	Oh, Doctor Beeching!	Passenger	Episode: "Father's Day"
