= Jeffrey Segal =

British actor (1920–2015)

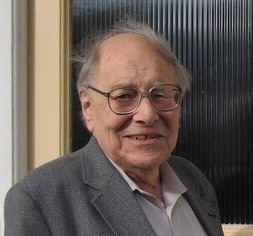
- Segal in London, 2008
- Born: 1 August 1920; London, England
- Died: 5 February 2015 (aged 94); London, England
- Occupations: Actor, scriptwriter
- Years active: 1934–2003

Jeffrey Segal (1 August 1920 – 5 February 2015) was an English actor and scriptwriter. He made his first screen appearance, as an extra, in the film Jew Süss (1934). From the early 1960s onwards he appeared in many British TV series, notably Callan, Z-Cars, The Protectors, Terry and June, The Pallisers, It Ain't Half Hot Mum and Dad's Army.

== Career ==
Segal played "Arthur Perkins" in the children's comedy series Rentaghost, in the "Gourmet Night" episode of Fawlty Towers, he played a hotel guest who is a hen-pecked husband and father of a babied spoiled brat; his character name was given, although this is never mentioned in dialogue, as Mr Heath in the credits, and he appeared as a civil servant in an episode in Yes Minister. He appeared in The Sweeney and Minder. In the mid-1980s he appeared in the mini-series of Oliver Twist, Vanity Fair, and in an episode of Jonathan Creek.

Segal broadcast on British radio over a long period, with more than one stint as a member of the BBC Drama Repertory Company (now the Radio Drama Company). He played parts as various as Agamemnon in Troilus and Cressida, Yasha in The Cherry Orchard and the Earl of Westmoreland in Henry V. He scripted programmes for BBC Radio, such as the series "Superintendent Pepper Remembers", in which he also acted, and at one time was a member of the scriptwriting team for "The Dales", another programme he sometimes took part in. Segal also appeared in two episodes of the BBC's department store sitcom Are You Being Served.

Segal's stage work was varied over the years, including performing in "The Queen's Highland Servant" at the Savoy Theatre. He was in Love's Labour's Lost at the Open Air Theatre, Regents's Park. At Richmond (Surrey) he played Rosencrantz to Alan Wheatley's Hamlet. Later he performed in numerous productions for the Royal Shakespeare Company, such as Much Ado About Nothing with Ralph Fiennes.

== Death ==
Segal died on 5 February 2015, aged 94.

== Selected filmography ==
- The Traitors (1962)
