= Roll Safe =

Internet meme

The frame which originated the internet meme

Roll Safe is an Internet meme in which British filmmaker and actor Kayode Ewumi, while portraying the character Reece Simpson (also known as Roll Safe) in his own web series Hood Documentary, is seen tapping his finger on his head. The images are used, often with joking caption, to mock poor decision-making and failures in critical thinking, a common format being "You can't X, if there is no Y".

The character Roll Safe had first emerged in Vine in 2015. The Hood Documentary episode was published in June 2016 and, months later, was used as a reaction image by some British Twitter accounts. In late January 2017, its popularity increased drastically, especially on the Black Twitter community. Khal of Complex declared it was "the new petty meme for 2017", Desire Thompson of Vibe said it was "the best way to kick off Black History Month", and "robopanda" of Yahoo said the meme "is here to give you the best worst advice".

It was included on many best 2017 memes lists, including Thrillist, Complex, BuzzFeed News, The Daily Dot, Insider, BBC News, PCMag, Washington Post, PopBuzz, and MTV UK. The Reddit moderators of the /r/MemeEconomy subreddit told Inverse that they thought it was one of the best memes of 2017.

It was a finalist in the 10th Shorty Awards. In 2024, The Daily Dot called the meme "one of the most indelible images" of 2010s Internet.
