= Andrew Tourell =

English actor (1946–2004)

- Born: Andrew Ernest Tourell; 18 January 1946; Islington, London, England
- Died: 17 January 2004 (aged 57); Haywards Heath, West Sussex, England
- Occupation: Actor
- Years active: 1967–1994
- Spouse: Janet Marshall (m. 1975)

Andrew Ernest Tourell (18 January 1946 – 17 January 2004) was an English actor. He was known for his extensive work in television and theatre.

== Career ==
=== Television ===
Tourell began his career working with the Swansea Repertory Company in 1967, appearing in plays including The Ghost Train as Saul Hodgkin, The Winslow Boy as Dickie Winslow, Dial M For Murder as Inspector Hubbard and Home at Seven as Dr. Sparling.

He was best known on television for his role as Geoffrey Ballard in Waiting For God where he appeared in 46 out of a total of 47 episodes. The son of leading character Tom (Graham Crowden), Geoffrey was known for his genial and mild mannered personality, yet could be insufferably dull at times. Although a successful businessman, his marriage to Marion (Sandra Payne) is a disaster; he frequently has to deal with her abusive, drunken and frequently adulterous behaviour. He eventually suffers a nervous breakdown in Series 5, where he leaves Marion, resigns from his position in the company and briefly reinvents himself as the rebellious biker 'Fatboy Higgins'.

Tourell also made appearances in supporting roles in a number of notable sitcoms including Napley in It Takes a Worried Man, Anthony Black in No Place Like Home, Mr. Gerrard, the prosecution counsel in the Only Fools and Horses episode 'Hole in One', Benson in Terry & June and Graham, the estranged (and later ex) husband of Penny (Jan Francis) in two episodes of Just Good Friends.

In 1982, he appeared in the Doctor Who serial Black Orchid as Constable Cummings, who assists the Fifth Doctor (Peter Davison) with his investigation into the murder of two servants at a fancy dress party. He also played Mark Smith in an episode of the long running soap opera Crossroads.

=== Stage ===
In addition to his work in television, Tourell also frequently played roles on stage, appearing in various productions including Boston Story as George Fenton at the Arts Theatre, Belfast; An Italian Straw Hat as Nonacourt and The Owl and Pussycat as Plum Pudding Flea at the Lyceum Theatre, Crewe. He later became director of productions for the Byre Theatre Company at the Byre Theatre, St Andrews, between 1972-5, where he directed a number of plays including The Importance of Being Earnest, The Boy Friend and Wait Until Dark. He also acted in various productions at the Byre, including Barefoot in the Park as Paul Bratter and Babes in the Wood as Friar Tuck. After leaving the Byre, Tourell directed further plays including An Evening with Marcel Proust at the Maximus Actors Arena, London and Revenge which ran at the Finborough Theatre, London in November 1982. He briefly returned to the Byre in 1979, where he directed Candida by George Bernard Shaw.

== Personal life ==
Tourell married the actress Janet Marshall in 1975, with whom he had worked at the Byre Theatre and Crewe Theatre Company. He died suddenly from a heart attack on 17 January 2004, the eve of his 58th birthday, in Haywards Heath.

== Filmography ==
Year	Title	Role	Notes
1976	Bouquet of Barbed Wire	2nd Police Constable	
1976	Dixon of Dock Green	Doctor	
1977	Fathers and Families	2nd Constable	
1979	Shelley	Clerk	
1981 – 1983	It Takes a Worried Man	Napley	18 episodes
1982	Doctor Who: Black Orchid	Constable Cummings	
1982	Strangers	PC Higgs	
1984	Just Good Friends	Graham Pratt	2 episodes
1985	Crossroads	Mark Smith	
1985	Only Fools and Horses	Mr. Gerrard	Episode: Hole in One
1986	Troubles and Strife	Ian Smith	
1986 – 1987	No Place Like Home	Anthony Black	5 episodes
1987	Bread	Doctor	
1990 – 1994	Waiting For God	Geoffrey Ballard	46 episodes
1991	The Secret	Second Policeman	
