= Sorry, I'm a Stranger Here Myself =

- Genre: Sitcom
- Created by: David Firth and Peter Tilbury.
- Starring: Robin Bailey; David Hargreaves; Nadim Sawalha; Diana Rayworth; Christopher Fulford
- Country of origin: United Kingdom
- Original language: English
- No. of series: 2
- No. of episodes: 13

Production
- Producer: Anthony Parker
- Running time: 30 minutes
- Production company: Thames Television

Original release
- Network: ITV
- Release: 15 June 1981 – 18 May 1982

Sorry, I'm a Stranger Here Myself is a British sitcom that aired for two seasons from 15 June 1981 to 18 May 1982. It was co-created by actor David Firth and Shelley and It Takes a Worried Man creator Peter Tilbury. The first series was co-written by Firth and Tilbury, and the second one by Firth alone.

It starred Robin Bailey, David Hargreaves, Nadim Sawalha (who had also guest starred in a few episodes of Shelley), Diana Rayworth and Christopher Fulford.

It was made by Thames Television for the ITV network.

== Plot ==
The show revolved around librarian Henry Nunn (played by Bailey), who lived with his wife Sybil in Datchet, Berkshire. He is henpecked by his wife, who seems only interested in sitting in front of the TV, and whose face is never seen on screen, only being represented by a waving arm (belonging to Pamela Manson).

On his 60th birthday, the frustrated Henry receives an inheritance from his late Uncle Crispin of a sum of money, and ownership of the house where he was born and spent his youth. The house was situated in Stackley, a fictitious Black Country town, so Henry quits his job and makes the move northwards.

Unfortunately for him, when he arrives at Stackley he will find himself immediately at odds with his neighbours: Tom (played by Hargreaves), a 'red under the bed' union shop steward and his wife Doreen (played by Rayworth); and Mumtaz (played by Sawalha), the Asian owner of the corner shop and who has a fondness for curry. Even worse, his house is squatted by Alex (played by Fulford), a green-haired punk.

The essence of the show was the lack of communication between the Henry and the other characters, and it was serialised, each episode following off from the previous one.

== Episodes ==
=== Series One (1981) ===
- 1.1. Death of a Songbird (15 June 1981) Written by David Firth and Peter Tilbury.
- 1.2. Arrival (22 June 1981) Written by David Firth and Peter Tilbury.
- 1.3. All Friends (29 June 1981) Written by David Firth and Peter Tilbury.
- 1.4. Haven't You Got Homes? (6 July 1981) Written by David Firth and Peter Tilbury.
- 1.5. Small Hours (13 July 1981) Written by David Firth and Peter Tilbury.
- 1.6. Never Look Back (20 July 1981) Written by David Firth and Peter Tilbury.
- 1.7. Dress Optional (27 July 1981) Written by David Firth and Peter Tilbury.

=== Series Two (1982) ===
- 2.1. Whither Henry (13 April 1982)
- 2.2. First Take Your Shepherd (20 April 1982)
- 2.3. A Cut Above the Restaurant (27 April 1982)
- 2.4. You Wash (4 May 1982)
- 2.5. Keep away from Children (11 May 1982)
- 2.6. The Camel's Back (18 May 1982)

== DVD release ==
The complete series of Sorry, I'm a Stranger Here Myself, both series 1 and 2, was released by Network in the UK (DVD Region 2) on 11 March 2013.
