= The Clairvoyant (TV series) =

- Genre: Sitcom
- Written by: Roy Clarke
- Directed by: Alan J. W. Bell
- Starring: Roy Kinnear; Sandra Dickinson; Carmel Cryan; Glynis Brooks; Hugh Lloyd; Shaun Curry
- Opening theme: "Que Sera, Sera (Whatever Will Be, Will Be)"
- Ending theme: "Que Sera, Sera (Whatever Will Be, Will Be)"
- Country of origin: United Kingdom
- Original language: English
- No. of series: 1
- No. of episodes: 6 (1 pilot)

Production
- Producer: Alan J. W. Bell
- Editor: Ian Williams
- Camera setup: Multi-camera
- Running time: 30 minutes

Original release
- Network: BBC2
- Release: 27 November 1984 – 19 June 1986

The Clairvoyant is a British television sitcom written by Roy Clarke, the creator of Last of the Summer Wine. Airing on BBC2, the series starred Roy Kinnear, Sandra Dickinson, Carmel Cryan, Glynis Brooks, Hugh Lloyd and Shaun Curry. Beginning with a pilot in 1984, five more episodes were broadcast in 1986.

== Premise ==
Roy Kinnear stars as Arnold Bristow, a dodgy used car salesman who is knocked down by a car. Regaining consciousness, Arnold believes that he has psychic powers, and decides to change his lifestyle by being more honest and moral in his business dealings, although this leads to near bankruptcy.

== Cast ==
- Roy Kinnear as Arnold Bristow
- Sandra Dickinson as Lily Wang
- Carmel Cryan as Carmen
- Glynis Brooks as Dawn
- Hugh Lloyd as Burma
- Shaun Curry as Newton

== Production ==
The series began with a pilot episode that aired on 27 November 1984, as the first episode of a four-week run of pilot episodes broadcast by BBC2. This was followed by five more episodes, broadcast from 15 May to 19 June 1986. The series' opening and closing theme was "Que Sera, Sera (Whatever Will Be, Will Be)", which was sung by Sandra Dickinson and arranged by Ronnie Hazlehurst.

== Episodes ==
=== Pilot (1984) ===
No. overall	No. in series	Title	Produced & Directed by	Written by	Original release date
1	1	"Pilot"	Alan J. W. Bell	Roy Clarke	27 November 1984

=== Series 1 (1986) ===
No. overall	No. in series	Title	Produced & Directed by	Written by	Original release date
2	1	"Episode 1"	Alan J. W. Bell	Roy Clarke	15 May 1986
3	2	"Episode 2"	Alan J. W. Bell	Roy Clarke	22 May 1986
4	3	"Episode 3"	Alan J. W. Bell	Roy Clarke	29 May 1986
5	4	"Episode 4"	Alan J. W. Bell	Roy Clarke	12 June 1986
6	5	"Episode 5"	Alan J. W. Bell	Roy Clarke	19 June 1986

== Reception ==
Of the series, in his Radio Times Guide to TV Comedy, Mark Lewisohn wrote: "A fairly odd idea, this, and not one that ran as smoothly as most of Roy Clarke's work. Kinnear was faultless as the confused Arnold and the support cast fared well enough, but the idea seemed flawed and the supposed psychic phenomenon too vague to hold much interest." In a 2018 review of the series, it was noted that: "Although the show only lasted one series, its six episodes quickly created something of a cult following in the UK."
