= David Firth (actor) =

English actor and writer

David Firth (born 15 March 1945) is an English actor, writer and singer. Firth created the role of Monsieur André in the original cast of Phantom of the Opera, among other roles in the West End, and originated the role of John Wilkes Booth in the first London production of Assassins, in a career spanning more than 40 years.

== Early life ==
Firth was born David Firth Coleman in Bedford on 15 March 1945, the son of Ivor Firth Coleman and Beatrice née Jenkins. He was educated at Bedford Modern School, the University of Sussex and the Guildhall School of Music and Drama. In 1969 he married Julia Elizabeth née Gould, and the couple have two sons.

== Career ==
Firth was with the Royal Shakespeare Company (1967–70) and the Royal National Theatre (1973). His first West End role was The Courier in 1776 (Albery Theatre, 1970), for which he was nominated as Most Promising Actor in the Plays and Players Awards. He created the role of Monsieur André in the original cast of The Phantom of the Opera (Her Majesty's Theatre, 1986).

During his stage career, Firth appeared in the revue Side by Side by Sondheim (Wyndham's Theatre and Garrick Theatre, 1977), played Algernon in a musical version of The Importance of Being Earnest (Ambassadors Theatre, 1984), originated the role of Sir Alastair in The Metropolitan Mikado (Queen Elizabeth Hall, 1985), and played roles in King Lear (Old Vic, 1988), The Hunting of the Snark (1991), A Tree Grows in Brooklyn (Barbican Theatre, 1992) and Jubilee (Barbican Theatre, 1992). In the original London production of Assassins (Donmar Warehouse, 1992), he played John Wilkes Booth "with mesmerising power". He followed this with roles in Knickerbocker Holiday (Barbican, 1993), Follies (Brighton, 1993) and Forty Years On (West Yorkshire Playhouse, 1994), and sang in Manfred at the Royal Festival Hall in 1994. He next appeared in Love Life (Barbican Theatre, 1995) and as Colonel Ricci in the original West End production of Passion (Queens Theatre, 1996). He created the role of Reed Chandler in The Fix (Donmar Warehouse, 1997), and appeared in Die Fledermaus (Arts Theatre, 1998), On a Clear Day You Can See Forever (Barbican Theatre, 1998), Good Grief (Yvonne Arnaud, 1998), H.M.S. Pinafore (Royal Festival Hall, 1999), Susanna's Secret (Drill Hall, 1999) and Jubilee (Her Majesty's and BBC Radio 3, 1999).

In recent decades, he appeared in Der Kuhandel (Barbican and BBC Radio 3, 2000), Journey's End (Drill Hall, 2000), Alidoro in Cenerentola (Music Theatre London, 2001), Reverend Tooker in Cat on a Hot Tin Roof (Lyric, 2001), Relatively Speaking (Secombe Theatre, Sutton, 2002), Our Song (tour, 2003), Coward and Others (2004), The Man Who... (Orange Tree Theatre, Richmond, 2005), The Shell Seekers (tour, 2006), Alan Sugar in Yellow Lines (Oval House, 2007), Park Avenue (Lilian Bayliss Theatre, 2008), Dirty Dancing (Aldwych Theatre, 2008) and Phantom of the Opera (Royal Albert Hall, 2011). He played Phileas Fogg in Around the World in Eighty Days in 2013 (Sadler's Wells Theatre).

Alongside his stage career, Firth has performed in a number of television series and on film, and is credited as a writer on The Return of Shelley, Home James! and Sorry, I'm a Stranger Here Myself.

== Filmography ==
=== Actor ===
- The Phantom of the Opera at the Royal Albert Hall (2011)
- Casualty (2006–07)
- Doctors (2003–07)
- Midsomer Murders (TV Series) (2007)
- The Upside of Anger (2005) – David Senior
- Waking the Dead (2004)
- The Bill (2003)
- Swallow (TV Series) (2001)
- Holby City (TV Series) (2001)
- Wycliffe (1998)
- Agatha Christie: Poirot (TV Series) (1992)
- Stay Lucky (TV Series) (1990)
- Screen One (TV Series) (1989)
- Singles (TV Series) (1989)
- Drummonds (1985)
- Yes Minister (TV Series) (1982)
- The New Adventures of Lucky Jim (TV Series) (1982)
- Troilus & Cressida (TV Movie) (1981)
- Sorry, I'm a Stranger Here Myself (TV Series) (1981)
- Love for Lydia (TV Series) (1977)
- Jubilee (TV Series) (1977)
- Raffles (TV Series) (1977)
- Wings (TV Series) (1977)
- Village Hall (TV Series) (1974)
- Armchair Theatre (TV Series) (1972)
- Jason King (TV Series) (1972)
- Spyder's Web (TV Series) (1972)
- Love Story (TV Series) (1972)
- The Search for the Nile (TV Mini-Series) (1971)
- Eyeless in Gaza (TV Series) (1971)

=== Writer ===
- The Return of Shelley (TV Series) (1992)
- Home James! (TV Series) (1987)
- Sorry, I'm A Stranger Here Myself (1981)
