= Debbie Linden =

Scottish model and actress (1961–1997)

- Born: Debbie Angela Linden; 22 February 1961; Glasgow, Scotland
- Died: 6 October 1997 (aged 36); Kingston upon Thames, London, England
- Occupations: Actress; glamour model
- Years active: 1978–1997

Debbie Angela Linden (22 February 1961 – 6 October 1997) was a Scottish-born actress and glamour model, best known for her role as old Mr Grace's secretary in the sitcom Are You Being Served? (1981).

== Life and career ==
Born in Glasgow, she acted in local plays and trained as a dancer in her teens, before starting as a lingerie and glamour model. She featured in The Benny Hill Show in 1978, followed by appearances in television shows headlined by Dick Emery and Jim Davidson. She also played roles in various other TV series, such as The Professionals, Just Good Friends, Bergerac, Cowboys, and The Bill. She appeared in several feature films, among them Home Before Midnight (1979) and The Wildcats of St Trinian's (1980).

Her "best-loved and most high-profile television role" was as the seductive secretary of Mr Grace (played by Kenneth Waller) in Are You Being Served?, although she only appeared in five episodes and had little dialogue. Her later appearances included Layla in the 1987 film Eat the Rich with The Comic Strip team, and as a hostess on the game show 3-2-1.

== Health and death ==
Linden was plagued with a drug problem, including alcohol, slimming pills, cocaine and Valium for years. On the night of 5 October 1997, she died of a heroin overdose at home at the age of 36. Her boyfriend, Russell Ainsworth, was acquitted of manslaughter charges but sentenced to two-and-a-half years imprisonment for supplying the drug.

She is buried in Surbiton Cemetery.

== Film credits ==
- Home Before Midnight (1979) as Carol
- The Wildcats of St Trinian's (1980) as Mavis
- Bloodbath at the House of Death (1984) as Attractive girl
- Eat the Rich (1987) as Layla

== TV credits ==
- The Benny Hill Show (1978)
- Dick Emery's Comedy Hour (1979)
- The Professionals (1979; Bodie's Girl)
- The Ghost Sonata (TV film) (1980; as Milkmaid)
- Cowboys (1980; as Doreen)
- The Jim Davidson Show (1981)
- Are You Being Served? (1981; as Old Mr Grace's secretary)
- Don't Rock the Boat (TV series) (1982; as Melanie)
- The Kenny Everett Television Show (1981)
- Just Good Friends (1984; as Brenda)
- The Kid (TV series) (1986; as the Blonde Girl)
- The Dame Edna Experience (1987 Christmas special episode "The Dame Edna Christmas Experience"; as Debbie)
- Bergerac (1991; as Margie)
- The Bill (1994; as Mrs Petty)

== Video release ==
- The Kenny Everett Naughty Joke Box (1981)
- Music Video "Why Me?" By Planet P Project (1983)

== Discography ==
- The Kenny Everett Naughty Joke-Box (1984)

Vinyl Album (catalogue ref LAX LP 101) on Relax Records.
