= Christopher Benjamin (actor) =

English actor (1934–2025)

- Born: Christopher John Benjamin; 27 December 1934; Trowbridge, Wiltshire, England
- Died: 10 January 2025 (aged 90)
- Education: Royal Academy of Dramatic Art
- Occupation: Actor
- Years active: 1958–2020
- Spouse: Anna Fox (m. 1959)

Christopher John Benjamin (27 December 1934 – 10 January 2025) was an English actor with many stage and television credits from 1958 to 2016. He played Henry Gordon Jago in the 1977 Doctor Who story The Talons of Weng-Chiang, a role he reprised for the audio drama series Jago & Litefoot (2010–2017, 2021), and made two other appearances in the series, portraying Sir Keith Gold in Inferno (1970) and Colonel Hugh Curbishley in "The Unicorn and the Wasp" (2008). He also provided the voice of Rowf in the animated film The Plague Dogs (1982). His radio acting career included two BBC Radio adaptations of Christopher Lee's crime drama Colvil and Soames.

== Early life ==
Benjamin was born in Trowbridge, Wiltshire, on 27 December 1934. He served in the Royal Air Force for his national service and studied at the Royal Academy of Dramatic Art.

== Career ==
Benjamin appeared regularly in television and radio from 1965. He is well known for his roles in some of the UK's biggest cult television programmes. This included playing the same character ("Potter") in two Patrick McGoohan dramas, Danger Man and The Prisoner, fuelling speculation that they are possibly linked. He played the Old Man (boss of Philip Roath) in the Thames Television comedy by Peter Tilbury, It Takes a Worried Man (1981). He was also an occasional guest star in The Avengers and Doctor Who, making three appearances in each, mostly in comedy roles.

Benjamin also played recurring roles in several period dramas. He was Sir John Glutton, the regular adversary in the period family adventure series Dick Turpin, Channing in several episodes of the third series of When The Boat Comes In, and Prosper Profond in the acclaimed 1967 adaptation of The Forsyte Saga. He reprised the role of Henry Gordon Jago, from the Doctor Who serial The Talons of Weng-Chiang in thirteen series of Jago and Litefoot audio plays, after a well-received episode of the Big Finish Productions audio C.D. series Doctor Who: The Companion Chronicles entitled The Mahogany Murderers, acting alongside Trevor Baxter as Professor George Litefoot. He played Sir William Lucas in the BBC's 1995 production of Pride and Prejudice.

Benjamin's few film roles included appearances in Ring of Bright Water (1969), Brief Encounter (1974), Hawk the Slayer (1980), The Tichborne Claimant (1998) and Angel (2007). His final screen appearance was in The Legend of Tarzan (2016).

Predominantly a stage actor, after six years in repertory theatres, Manchester, Salisbury and Bristol Old Vic (1958–1965), he performed regularly over twenty years with the Royal Shakespeare Company. He played Nick Bottom five times, at Bristol Old Vic, Regents Park, on Radio 3, at the RSC (including a tour of Australia and New Zealand) and finally at Glyndebourne in The Fairy-Queen, before retiring from the stage in 2012.

Benjamin's West End performances included How the Other Half Loves at the Duke of Yorks, A Voyage Round My Father at Wyndhams, The Clandestine Marriage at the Queens Theatre, Sweeney Todd at the Royal National Theatre, and The Resistible Rise of Arturo Ui at the Saville (with Leonard Rossiter). He also appeared in several plays at the Donmar, the Kings Head, Mermaid, etc. He played Falstaff in rep at Salisbury, at Regents Park, and at the Globe in 2008 and after touring the US and UK in 2010.

== Personal life and death ==
Benjamin lived in Hampstead, London, with his wife, Anna Fox, an actress and writer. He died on 10 January 2025, at the age of 90.

== Selected filmography ==
Year	Title	Role	Notes
1965	The Wednesday Play	Dan Royston	Sir Jocelyn, the Minister Would Like a Word
1965	Z-Cars	Dennis Ludd	Episode: "Give a Dog a Name"
1965	The Man in Room 17	Chief Supt. Craythorpe	Episode: "The Millons of Muzafariyah"
1966	Orlando	The Great Cardini	5 episodes
1966	The Baron	Verel	Episode: "The Seven Eyes of Night"
1966–1968	The Avengers	Various roles	3 episodes
1967	Danger Man	Potter	Episode: "Koroshi"
1967	The Forsyte Saga	Prosper Profond	4 episodes
1967–1968	The Prisoner	Various roles	3 episodes
1968	Public Eye	Barnby	Episode: "There's No Future in Monkey Business"
1968	Late Night Horror	Algy Somerville	The Kiss of Blood
1968	The Saint	Fish	Episode: "The Master Plan"
1969	Ring of Bright Water	London Fishmonger	Film
1969	Fraud Squad	Lal Choudhry	Episode: "Over a Barrel"
1969	The Gold Robbers	Edward Meakin	Episode: "An Oddly Honest Man"
1970	Ace of Wands	Falk	2 episodes
1970	Paul Temple	Roffey	Episode: "The Artknappers"
1970	The Roads to Freedom	Assistant Superintendent	1 episode
1970, 1976	Softly, Softly: Task Force	Chief Immigration Officer Ingrams/Civil Servant	2 episodes
1970, 1977	Doctor Who	Sir Keith Gold/Henry Gordon Jago	2 serials: Inferno and The Talons of Weng-Chiang
1971	Jason King	The Police Inspector	Episode: "A Red Red Rose Forever"
1971	Man at the Top	Mr. Fisher	Episode: "A Bit of Spare, Nothing Else"
1971	Never Mind the Quality, Feel the Width	Dr. Shapiro	Episode: "Manny Cohen R.I.P."
1972	Budgie	Claude	Episode: "Twenty-Four Thousand Ball Point Pens"
1972	The Protectors	Banker	Episode: "The Quick Brown Fox"
1972	The Strauss Family	Domnayer	5 episodes
1972	The Onedin Line	Said Ben Alim	Episode: "The Challenge"
1973	Bowler	Supt. Chamberlain	3 episodes
1973	Jack the Ripper	Club Man	2 episodes
1973	New Scotland Yard	Mr. Foster	Episode: "Rogues Gallery"
1973	Upstairs, Downstairs	Max Weinberg	Episode: "A Change of Scene"
1973	Van der Valk	Mulder	Episode: "Rich Man, Poor Man"
1974	Brief Encounter	Porter	Film
1974	Father Brown	Dukes	Episode: "The Quick One"
1974	Special Branch	Dr. Eric Blyth	Episode: "Stand and Deliver"
1975	Churchill's People	Peter	Episode: "On the Anvil"
1975	Village Hall	Bill Jolly	Old Scores
1975–1976	Poldark	Sir Hugh Boldrugan	9 episodes
1976	Angels	Samuels	Episode: "Challenges"
1976	Hadleigh	Oberman	Episode: "Hong Kong Rock"
1976	The Squirrels	Craig	Episode: "The Cruise"
1976	Gangsters	Assistant Managing Director	3 episodes
1977	Rooms	Bernard Metcalfe	3 episodes
1977	Target	Panter	Episode: "Blow Out"
1977	When the Boat Comes In	Channing	3 episodes
1977	Yes, Honestly	Roscoe B. Roscoe	Episode: "Educating Mr. Roscoe"
1978	Armchair Thriller	Det. Inspector Tarrant	5 episodes
1978	Get Some In!	Sergeant Foot	2 episodes
1978	Scorpion Tales	Arab	Episode: "Crimes of Persuasion"
1978	The Sandbaggers	David Follett	Episode: "The Most Suitable Person"
1978	Wilde Alliance	Miller	Episode: "Affay in Amsterdam"
1979–1980	Dick Turpin	Sir John Glutton	14 episodes
1980	Hawk the Slayer	Fitzwalter	Film
1980	Shoestring	Leacock	Episode: "Room with a View"
1980	Play For Today	Rabbi	The Executioner
1980	We, the Accused	Inglewood	3 episodes
1980–1982	Holding the Fort	Col. Aubrey Sanderson	5 episodes
1981	A Spy at Evening	Stevens	4 episodes
1981	Play For Today	Mr. Porter	A Brush with Mr. Porter on the Road to El Dorado
1981	Winston Churchill: The Wilderness Years	Air Ministry Official	Episode: "The Flying Peril"
1981–1983	It Takes a Worried Man	The Old Man	16 episodes
1982	Shine on Harvey Moon	Mr. Hartley	2 episodes
1982	The Life and Times of Nicholas Nickleby	Mr. Vincent Crummings	3 episodes
1982	The Plague Dogs	Rowf (voice)	Film
1984	Minder	Mr. Rushmere	Episode: "The Car Lot Baggers"
1985	Blott on the Landscape	Chief Constable	Episode: "Man in a Tree"
1985	Black Silk	Judge	Episode: "Winner Takes All"
1986	Dempsey and Makepeace	Sam Powell	Episode: "Mantrap"
1986	Call Me, Mister	Shop Manager	Episode: "The Other Woman"
1986	The Return of Sherlock Holmes	Dr. Huxtable	Episode: "The Priory School"
1987	Boon	Teddy Rawlingston	Episode: "A Fistful of Pesetas"
1987	Casanova	Massimo	TV movie
1987	The Diary of Anne Frank	Mr Van Daan	3 episodes
1987	Yes, Prime Minister	French Ambassador	Episode: "A Diplomatic Incident"
1988	Melba	Col. Otway	4 episodes
	King and Castle	Enwright	Episode: "Cons"
1989	Saracen	Charles Saunders	Episode: "Girls' Talk"
1990	Brass	Sir Dudley Tilstock	Episode: "Bradley Gets on Top"
1990	Campion	Coroner	Episode: "Flowers for the Judge – Part 1"
1990	Haggard	Lord Tartlet	Episode: "The Great Lover"
1990	Spymaker: The Secret Life of Ian Fleming	McKinnon	TV movie
1991	Rumpole of the Bailey	Sir Denis Tolston	Episode: "Rumpole and the Right to Silence"
1991	Thatcher: The Final Days	George Younger	TV movie
1991	She-Wolf of London	Dr. Morris	Episode: "Voodoo Child"
1992	A Likely Lad	Harold Sowter	6 episodes
1992	Casualty	Henry Lindall	Episode: "Cry Wolf"
1992	Maigret	Guillaume Saure	Episode: "Maigret and the Burgular's Wife"
1992	Inspector Morse	Professor Furlong	Episode: "Cherubim & Seraphim"
1992	London's Burning	Mr. Brody	2 episodes
1994	Lovejoy	Walid	Episode: "Fruit of the Desert"
1994	The Tomorrow People	Middlemass	4 episodes
1995	Pride and Prejudice	Sir William Lucas	5 episodes
1998	Seesaw	Malcolm Green	2 episodes
1998	The Last Salute	Sir Gilbert	Episode: "One for the Road"
1998	The Tichborne Claimant	Gibbes	Film
1999	Treasure Island	Squire Trelawney	TV movie
2001	Sword of Honour	Doctor	TV movie
2003	Foyle's War	Brigadier Harcourt	Episode: "War Games"
2003	Looking For Victoria	Lord Stanley	TV movie
2003–2006	Judge John Deed	Steve Gaydon	4 episodes
2004	Down to Earth	Mr. Yates	Episode: "Family Ties"
2005	Midsomer Murders	Harvey Crane	Episode: "Midsomer Rhapsody"
2006	Heartbeat	Oliver Ridley	Episode: "Accidents Happen"
2006	Rosemary & Thyme	Trevor Squires	Episode: "Seeds of Time"
2007	Angel	Lord Norley	Film
2008	Doctor Who	Colonel Hugh Curbishley	Episode: "The Unicorn and the Wasp"
2009	Doctors	Arthur Cuthbert	Episode: "Up the Garden Path"
2011	The Merry Wives of Windsor	Sir John Falstaff	Video
2016	The Legend of Tarzan	Lord Knutsford	Film
