= List of Ripping Yarns episodes =

Ripping Yarns is a British television comedy series created by Michael Palin and Terry Jones and first broadcast on BBC 2 between 1976 and 1979. This is a list of the nine episodes forming the series. Although all were co-written by Palin and Jones, the latter appeared only in the first episode, Tomkinson's Schooldays.

== Pilot and first series ==
The series is introduced by a bearded man in an opera cape (Palin) standing at some cliffs, who takes several tries to say the phrase "The follies of our youth are in retrospect glorious when compared to the follies of our old age." The director (Jones) keeps cueing him and finishes by saying it himself. This is a parody of Orson Welles' appearance in a Domecq sherry commercial, made explicit by Palin saying "Our sherry tonight...".

No. in series	Title	Setting	Directed by	Original release date
1	"Tomkinson's Schooldays"	England, 1913	Terry Hughes	7 January 1976
Tomkinson (Palin) is a new boy at Graybridge, a traditional English public school. In voiceover he tells of the horrors of school life: beating the headmaster (also Palin), fighting the grizzly bear, being nailed to the wall on St. Tadger's Day, having to ask permission to breathe out after 10:30 pm, and Grayson (Ian Ogilvy), the school bully, who gets whatever he wants: alcohol, cigarettes and the company of an unmarried Filipina woman. Grayson addresses other pupils with epithets such as "you dismally untalented little creep" and "you spotty little oik". One day, Tomkinson is shot in the stomach during French translation. When his mother (Gwen Watford) visits him in hospital, he begs her to take him home, but she refuses and tells him that his father, a polar explorer, has returned to the Antarctic because he has got a woman there. Tomkinson is shocked - not least because his father is homosexual. Tomkinson decides to escape. During a rugby match he scores a try and keeps on running, but having run some miles he is caught by the school leopard (and carried back to school on a stretcher). Then he tries to get out disguised as a woman and is caught by the Spanish master (Jones) who tries to molest him. In the school's model boat club, Tomkinson builds a full-scale model icebreaker, but is told to melt it down by Mr. Ellis (Jones). When a polar explorer comes to the school to do a speech, Tomkinson hides in his trunk, but then discovers that the polar explorer was only Mr. Ellis. After three weeks' detention in the school's maggot-pit, Tomkinson is brought before Grayson. He tells Tomkinson that he and the chaplain control the way out of the school, and that he wants Tomkinson to test the chaplain's new tunnel. An hour later Tomkinson finds himself behind the headmaster's writing desk, completely drunk, with 200 cigarettes and accompanied by a half-naked, unmarried Filipina lady, as the tunnel finishes too early. He is sentenced to the worst penalty: the 30-mile hop against St. Anthony's, a Buddhist public school. During the first half of the hop, Graybridge students drop out one by one, and just as Tomkinson feels his end near, Grayson comes and gives him a stimulant. Tomkinson wins the hop and he hops on to his home, where he finds his mother entangled with a half-naked man. He again tries to persuade her to let him stay, she again refuses. He is about to leave when another half-naked man joins them: it is his father (Jones). Tomkinson returns to Graybridge where he is appointed the new school bully, Grayson having been offered a place at Eton. Tomkinson sees his chance to change Graybridge; but decides he will have to do it in small steps, and carries on the bullying tradition. Notes: The episode was made as a pilot at the suggestion of BBC Director Terry Hughes, the intention being to "take a familiar genre of Victorian and Edwardian children's literature, the public school story, and to make it the basis of an outrageous spoof". It was well-received, and a series was commissioned. The episode is a parody of any number of "school stories", most notably Tom Brown's Schooldays and the Greyfriars stories of Charles Hamilton. Scenes were filmed in Dorset.
2	"The Testing of Eric Olthwaite"	Denley Moor, 1934	Jim Franklin	27 September 1977
Eric Olthwaite (Palin) is interested in precipitation patterns in West Yorkshire, shovels and black pudding (his mother makes pudding so black, that even the white bits are black). His family avoids him. His mother (Barbara New) always gives him something to do the moment he starts talking, his sister Irene (Anita Carey) simply tells him to shut up, his father (John Barrett) pretends to be French in the hope that Eric won't talk to him or fakes a bilious attack at meal times. One morning, Eric discovers that his family has left him. He tries to talk about it with his girlfriend, Enid Bag (Petra Markham), but she's too busy having an affair with another man. Her father (Reg Lye), a vulture keeper, tells Eric what his problem is: He's boring. He advises him to make something out of his life. Eric tries to start at a bank, but the manager (Palin again) tells him that he's too boring for the job. Eric's about to leave when the bank is robbed by a man called Arthur (Kenneth Colley), who takes Eric with him. They run for it and manage to escape. Arthur is about to shoot Eric, when the two of them discover how much they've got in common: they're both interested in rain, shovels and black pudding. They decide to form a gang together. In a pastiche of Bonnie and Clyde the pair are shown carrying out daring raids to capture rainfall records. Their new fame actually makes Eric interesting. Enid joins them, Eric's mother and father are interviewed about him and in the end, Eric Olthwaite is appointed mayor of Denley Moor. In the second series episode "Golden Gordon", Olthwaite is briefly seen playing for Denley Moor's football team. His past as a bank robber is scornfully mentioned. Notes: Location scenes were filmed at Beamish, Sacriston, Tow Law, and High Force, all in County Durham.
3	"Escape from Stalag Luft 112B"	Germany, 1917	Jim Franklin	4 October 1977
Major Errol Phipps (Palin) is a "legend" among prisoners of war. He has attempted over five hundred escapes, two hundred of them before he left England. One day in June 1917, therefore, he is transferred to the most infamous prison camp: Stalag Luft 112B. He tries eleven escapes en route (getting a black eye for his pains) and one just after arriving, but is stopped by fellow British officers who are comfortable where they are, bossing the Germans around. One of the officers is Major Attenborough (David Griffin), alluding to Richard Attenborough's role in the film The Great Escape, which the episode parodies very successfully. Escape attempts have to be organized by a special committee which only meets very irregularly, yet Phipps single-mindedly refuses to co-operate with people apparently content to "sit around on (their) arses until the war's over" and tries to escape nonetheless. He starts to construct a glider out of toilet rolls, maps the wires and perimeters and starts digging tunnels in the flower beds, yet one escape was foiled when he was reported to the Germans who promptly took him away to solitary confinement; unbeknownst to Phipps, he had almost stumbled across one of the escape tunnels under construction, about which he had known nothing, and therefore needed to be stopped. One day, he is woken up by the furious guard leader Sergeant Vogel (Roy Kinnear): all the other prisoners have escaped. To give Phipps no chance to do the same, he is from now on closely watched even when using the toilet. One night, two guards ask him for help. They want to escape because they are fed up with Vogel's somewhat brutal methods of running the camp (which is why the Kommandant apparently wants to escape as well). Phipps refuses, saying he would never besmirch the name of his regiment by collaborating with the enemy. The next morning, he finds all the guards, except Vogel, are escaping. Vogel tries to persuade him "as a friend" to help him shoot the other guards, yet Phipps again refuses. When Vogel shoots, he accidentally kills the fleeing Kommandant and has no choice but to escape. Phipps is left alone and has at last time to complete all his escape plans. He finishes his glider, digs a tunnel system "so elaborate that it later became part of the Munich underground", and builds a giant catapult "that could fling him 200 miles across occupied Europe". He is about to start constructing a hot air balloon "using only the little bits you peel off Elastoplast before sticking it on" when "tragedy struck" - peace is declared (on 11 November 1918). Major Phipps "was the only man never to escape from Stalag Luft 112B". He returns to England but dies a broken man within three months. Two years after his burial at Totnes, a hole is found dug from his grave to the cemetery fence: his final escape was his "greatest". Notes: Location scenes were filmed on Salisbury Plain.
4	"Murder at Moorstones Manor"	Scotland, 1926	Terry Hughes	11 October 1977
Sir Clive Chiddingfold (Frank Middlemass), the irascible proprietor of Moorstones Manor, has his birthday. His sons Hugo and Charles (both played by Palin) drive up with their fiancées. Hugo, the elder, is only interested in motors and seen as a loony by the rest of the family. He even leaves his fiancée Dora (Candace Glendenning) on the moor, when she makes him choose between her and the car. Charles, the younger, arrives with his fiancée Ruth (Ann Zelda). During dinner, Ruth drops unconscious into a cottage pie, due to Sir Clive's stories of cruelty. Hugo comes down for a chat, his mother takes him up to bed again, when they hear a shot. Sir Clive has just been murdered. Charles claims having seen nothing as he just watched a trapdoor open. Lady Chiddingfold (Isabel Dean) then discovers that Ruth has choked on her pie. Charles offers to go and check whether Hugo is still alive. There is another shot and Charles comes down saying Hugo was shot and that he again saw nothing due to the fact that he watched a secret passageway open. In the middle of the night, Dora reaches Moorstones Manor, in a terrible state. The next morning, Dr. Farson (Iain Cuthbertson) comes to check on Dora and the dead. He is obsessed with Lady Chiddingfold and at last confesses that he shot everyone to have her all for himself. The butler Manners (Harold Innocent) comes in and confesses to the murders. He did it as revenge, because he didn't want to be ordered around anymore. Dora arrives and claims she shot everyone as a revenge for having had to bear Hugo for six years. Charles comes down and also confesses to the murders, having been after the money. The four confessed murderers then shoot one another and only Lady Chiddingfold is left. Notes: Location shooting took place at Harefield, Middlesex and Glencoe, Scotland.
5	"Across the Andes by Frog"	Peru, 1927	Terry Hughes	18 October 1977
Plot: Walter Snetterton (Palin) is an explorer unluckily forgotten. His expedition had been trying to prove that frogs could scale the highest mountains. He wanted to cross the Andes by frog. The expedition starts in the sleepy village of Quequeña, where they are not quite greeted by the British Consul (Denholm Elliott), and meet some problems. Due to the Cup Final, the only guide available is an old woman (Eileen Way), who nonetheless is able to climb the mountains much faster than Snetterton and his men. Then the natives think the frogs bring bad luck. Snetterton dismisses this as superstitious nonsense, but has three men guard the frogs. The next morning, after his Sergeant Major (Don Henderson) has left the army to marry a native girl, he discovers that they all have left their posts for a love night with the beautiful native maidens and that someone has set all the frogs free. He makes the whole village search for the frogs, but they are distracted by the radio, transmitting Wimbledon week tennis. Furious, Snetterton shoots the radio and realises he's gone too far. Pursued by the angry villagers, he grabs the last remaining frog (the Himalayan sleeping frog) and runs for the mountains. Later, only his journal is found, saying that after three weeks he had to eat the frog. However, we are told that the other frogs hopped to Mexico City, therefore proving his theories right. Notes: This story had first appeared in Palin & Jones' 1974 book "Bert Fegg's Nasty Book for Boys and Girls". Location shooting was at Glencoe, Scotland.
6	"The Curse of the Claw"	Maidenhead, 1926	Jim Franklin	25 October 1977
In a dark and stormy night, Sir Kevin Orr (Palin) is visited by a bunch of strange men: Captain Merson (Keith Smith) leading an expedition to the Naga Hills of Burma with a few natives in tow. On hearing this place name, Sir Kevin gets excited and tells Merson a long hidden secret. He grew up in a very strict house. His parents (Tenniel Evans and Hilary Mason) had his sister imprisoned for putting too much butter on her scone and his brother killed for walking on the flower beds. Young Kevin (Nigel Rhodes) had a secret sweetheart, Agatha (Bridget Armstrong) - so secret that she herself didn't know. The only excitement in his life was visiting his Uncle Jack (Palin), who loved dirt and filth and had about every disease known to man. On his sixtieth birthday, Uncle Jack told his now grown nephew a secret: he had taken a sacred claw from the Naga hills in Burma, but had discovered there was a curse on it. The owner had to return it before his sixtieth birthday to the tribesmen or die. Kevin promises to do his best and on no account to touch the Claw. He tries to persuade his parents to let him go, but of course they refuse. His father touches the Claw in spite of Kevin's warnings and breaks two legs just as a thunderstorm tears the house apart. Kevin runs away with the Claw. He becomes captain of the Greasy Bastard, a small ship carrying rubber goods between England and Burma. But the Curse starts to operate on him, and he finds himself attracted to the Chief Petty Officer Russell (Judy Loe). After some agonising, he discovers that Russell is a woman and that in fact nearly all members of the crew are. The voyage becomes a paradise and they don't want it to end when they reach Burma. Kevin tries to explain the situation to his crew, but Russell throws the Claw into the sea. The ship explodes and Kevin is the only survivor. He returns to his uncle, who tells him that the Claw will find a way to return to him and that he shall live in this house until it does. Then he dies. Kevin, after his parents' death, marries Agatha, and lives happily in his uncle's house until the morning of his sixtieth birthday, when he finds his wife dead and the Claw lying next to her. He hands it back to the Naga tribesmen. But it has one final trick to play on him: his uncle and wife are returning from the dead, Kevin and Agatha become kids again and suddenly his father is standing in front of the door to fetch him. Notes: The locations used were at Rippingale, Lincolnshire and the Medway Estuary.

== Second series ==
Consisting of only three episodes and following two years after the first, the series is introduced by the same presenter as the first. This time, he knows his text and explains in length about a London building, about to be important in the story. Only, a truck stops just in front of him, blocking him from view. Two cars crash in front of the truck and the truck driver does a tap dance when he realises he's on film. The presenter doesn't notice and is rather surprised when told that the scene has to be filmed again.

No. in series	Title	Setting	Directed by	Original release date
1	"Whinfrey's Last Case"	England, 1913	Alan J. W. Bell	10 October 1979
Plot: In the War Office in Whitehall, rumours abound that the Germans will start the war one year early. The British government ask Gerald Whinfrey (Palin) to look into this. However, Whinfrey refuses. In the last four months, he has stopped the Balkan Wars, sold submarines to France, annexed two new colonies, and started an insurrection in Brazil. He feels he has deserved a holiday. So he goes off to Torpoint, a small Cornish village, for a fishing holiday. A lot of strange events happen there. First, a porter on the station tells him that he has got off at the wrong station, however a sign concealed by shrubs reveals the station to be Torpoint after all. In the local pub, the waitress, a small lady (Ann Way), goes to great lengths never to reach over the counter. She also drives Gerald in the taxi to Smuggler's Cottage, a beach house, even though she can't see the road. Whinfrey arrives and is greeted by a housekeeper, Mrs. Otway (Maria Aitken) and a strangely large staff of at least 20 people. Before sleeping, he has to chase out the butler, the master of the bedchamber, and Mr. Girton (Edward Hardwicke), who insist on tuning the mattress' bedsprings. The next morning, he finds the house surrounded by about eighty gardeners, his clothes removed and his door locked. He overhears Mrs. Otway and Mr. Girton plotting on how to stop him getting out of the house and poisoning his breakfast. Remembering that he is in smuggling country, Whinfrey finds twenty-three secret passageways in his room and escapes, pursued by Girton and Mrs. Otway. He reaches Torpoint and enters the pub again, where he finds the villagers singing a Bavarian drinking song. One of them introduces the others in uneasy English and, when Gerald asks their names, they all claim to be either named Eddie or Tony. The cottage's staff burst in and reveal their plans - that they are from Germany and were planning to infiltrate Britain with nannies, shepherds, judges, village idiots, and vicars. At this moment the War Office staff burst in, arresting them all. The Germans thank Whinfrey, saying it was an honour to be caught by him. The British general tells Gerald that he nearly believed Whinfrey was really going on holiday and thanks him for saving the world once again. Notes: Cape Cornwall was used as an authentic location.
2	"Golden Gordon"	Barnstoneworth, Yorkshire, 1935	Alan J.W. Bell	17 October 1979
Plot: Barnstoneworth United is a small football club, once successful in the Yorkshire Premier League, now losing every game. One of their fans, Gordon Ottershaw (Palin), who has named his son Barnstoneworth United (John Berlyne), comes home after every lost match and smashes the furniture in fury. His wife Eileen (Gwen Taylor) quietly accepts this, although she protects the valuable family clock on the mantelpiece. She keeps trying to tell him that she's having a baby, even putting notes in his lunchbox, but he seems not to notice. After an 8-1 defeat by an elderly team ("Eight One - Eight bloody One! - And even that were an own goal!"), it is decided that the club will be disbanded and the ground sold to a scrap dealer. The upcoming match against Denley Moor (the scene of The Testing of Eric Olthwaite) will therefore be the last. Gordon visits the new owner, Mr. Foggen (Bill Fraser), and tries to persuade him to keep the club alive. Foggen refuses, but Gordon has another idea. He starts visiting the players from the great 1922 team, reassembling them for the last match. The day of the match it looks bad for Barnstoneworth. They have only four players (and three pairs of shorts), whereas the captain of the Denley Moor team is the famous Eric Olthwaite. At the last minute, Gordon arrives with the old team, who defeat Denley Moor 8-1. Gordon arrives home and the family smashes the furniture together in happiness. Eileen joins in, throwing a large potted plant at Gordon, who tries to "head" it like a football. The episode ends on a freeze-frame of him heading potted plant, as Eileen is heard saying, "Gordon? Gordon?". Notes: Filming locations include Saltaire and Keighley, West Yorkshire. John Cleese makes a brief cameo as a passer-by in the street.
3	"Roger of the Raj"	England/India, 1914	Jim Franklin	24 October 1979
Plot: Roger Bartlesham (Palin) has grown up in a wealthy family. They have a large number of houses, an overflowing breakfast table, even more servants. Roger's mother, Lady Bartlesham (Joan Sanderson), has killed more grouse than any woman in history and quite a few beaters, who looked too much like grouse. His father, Lord Bartlesham (Richard Vernon), can't get used to the fact that slavery no longer exists and that all his servants are free men and women. Roger is rather uncomfortable with his parents and spends a lot of time with his Latin tutor, Mr. Hopper (Roger Brierley), a former child molester, who doesn't teach him Latin (because he knows none) but about Marxism and socialism. When the war breaks out, the Bartleshams move to India and do their part for King and country (which is having Indian servants playing their croquet for them). One evening, after dinner, the ladies are about to withdraw from the table when Captain Morrison (Charles McKeown) suddenly exclaims: "We'll be in to spank you later, you firm-buttocked young amazons." Offended, Bartlesham says to him "You know what you've got to do," and so Morrison steps outside and shoots himself. A moment later, another man is caught passing the port from left to right. He too has to step out and shoot himself. Another man stands up and says he thinks you should be able to pass the port any way you wanted to. He follows the other two. Another one gets up and says the women should be allowed port, too. After that death, Colonel Runciman (John Le Mesurier) gets up and says he also wanted the women in here. He also wanted to abolish the Loyal Toast, the National Anthem and set up a socialist republic. After he shoots himself (needing two attempts because he misses the first time), Roger gets up, leaving his father alone. Roger visits his girlfriend Miranda (Jan Francis). They dream of having a small shop, a pharmacy perhaps, but Miranda first refuses, saying that there also have to be rich people. However, she is won over by Roger's ideas. They prepare to leave for England, but in the meantime, the Russian Revolution has started. Mr. Hopper is delighted and tries to make Roger join him and the regiment in a mutiny. The Bartleshams wake and mistake the noise for a Pathan uprising. The regiment force Roger to be their leader and talk to his parents. Lady Bartlesham, convinced by Hopper that Roger really was the leader, is prepared to shoot him. The soldiers shoot back at her, Miranda comes to rescue Roger, the chaos escalates and, under its cover, Roger and Miranda escape. They realise their dream of a small shop in the big manor belonging to Roger's parents. Notes: Final episode.
