= Sylvia Kay =

British actress (1936–2019)

- Born: Sylvia Margaret Kay; 16 May 1936; Stockport, Cheshire, England
- Died: 18 January 2019 (aged 82); London, England
- Occupation: Actress
- Years active: 1957–1997
- Spouses: Ted Kotcheff (m. 1962; div. 1972) (3 Children) Christopher Douglas (m. 1987; div. 2008)
- Children: 3

Sylvia Margaret Kay (16 May 1936 – 18 January 2019) was an English character actress who had many roles in British television programmes, most notably as Daphne Warrender in the BBC sitcom Just Good Friends.

== Early life ==
Sylvia Kay was the daughter of William Kay, a metallurgist, and his wife, Edith. She was born in Stockport and raised in Altrincham, and attended Culcheth Hall school in Altrincham. She briefly studied psychology at Manchester University before leaving to train as an actress at Lamda in London.

== Career ==
Kay appeared in films such as That Kind of Girl (1963), Rapture (1965), Wake in Fright (1971) (directed by her then-husband Ted Kotcheff), and Coming Out of the Ice (1982). She also appeared in the television dramas The Avengers (1968), Crown Court, Dalziel and Pascoe, Shelley, Z-Cars, Dead of Night, Minder, Jeeves and Wooster, Just Good Friends, The Professionals, Mixed Blessings and an episode of Public Eye (1968). As landlady Dorothy Lawson, she appeared in 29 episodes of the first series of Rooms (1974–77).

== Personal life ==
Sylvia was married twice. In 1962 she married the Canadian director, Ted Kotcheff, with whom she had three children, Aaron, Katrina and Joshua. After their divorce she married again in 1987 to the actor and writer, Christopher Douglas. The marriage ended in divorce in 2008.

In the 1990s, she resumed her psychology studies, qualified as a psychotherapist and practised in London and later in Herefordshire until 2017.

== Filmography ==
Year	Title	Role	Notes
1957	Kill Me Tomorrow	Nurse	
1963	That Kind of Girl	Mrs. Millar	
1965	Rapture	Genevieve	
1971	Wake in Fright	Janette Hynes	
