= Under the Hammer =

- Genre: Comedy drama
- Written by: John Mortimer
- Directed by: Robert Tronson; David Tucker
- Starring: Richard Wilson; Jan Francis; Robert Lang
- Composer: Bill Connor
- Country of origin: United Kingdom
- Original language: English
- No. of series: 1
- No. of episodes: 7

Production
- Executive producer: Colin Rogers
- Producers: Jonathan Alwyn; Jacqueline Davis
- Running time: 51 minutes
- Production companies: New Penny Productions; Meridian Broadcasting

Original release
- Network: ITV
- Release: 10 January – 21 February 1994

Under the Hammer is a British comedy drama television series that originally aired on ITV from 10 January to 21 February 1994. Written by John Mortimer, it is set at a London auction house.

== Episodes ==
1. "The Fatal Attribution" (10 January 1994)
2. "Wonders in the Deep" (17 January 1994)
3. "The Virgin of Vitebsk" (24 January 1994)
4. "The Jolly Joker" (31 January 1994)
5. "After Titian" (7 February 1994)
6. "The Spectre at the Feast" (14 February 1994)
7. "Treasure Trove" (21 February 1994)

== Main cast ==
- Richard Wilson as Ben Glazier
- Jan Francis as Maggie Perowne
- Robert Lang as Lord Holloway
- Michael Siberry as Nick Roper
- Marsha Fitzalan as Camilla Mounsey
- Stephen Boxer as Keith Shrimsley
- Rose Keegan as Lucy Starr
- Susan Engel as Lady Holloway

Other actors who appeared in episodes of the series include John Gielgud, Ian Carmichael, Ursula Howells, Dan O'Herlihy, Hermione Norris, Thora Hird, Keith Barron, Judy Cornwell, Burt Kwouk, Alfred Burke, Phyllida Law, Lloyd McGuire, Philip Fox, Frederick Treves, James Cossins, Martin Clunes, Rosalie Crutchley, Emily Mortimer, Rosemary Harris, Michael J. Shannon and Susan Fleetwood.
