= Spark (TV series) =

British television sitcom (1997)

- Opening title card
- Genre: Sitcom
- Written by: Roy Clarke
- Directed by: Angela de Chastelai Smith
- Starring: James Fleet; Jan Francis; Anne Reid; Brigit Forsyth; Rebecca Raybone
- Composer: Roy Moore
- Country of origin: United Kingdom
- Original language: English
- No. of series: 1
- No. of episodes: 6

Production
- Executive producer: Mike Stephens
- Editor: Roger Martin
- Camera setup: Multi-camera
- Running time: 30 minutes

Original release
- Network: BBC One
- Release: 10 November – 15 December 1997

Spark is British television sitcom that was first broadcast on BBC One from 10 November to 15 December 1997. Written by Roy Clarke, the six-episode series starred James Fleet, Jan Francis, Anne Reid, Brigit Forsyth and Rebecca Raybone.

== Premise ==
Following the death of his mother, mild-mannered computer expert Ashley Parkerwell finds himself free to experience life and romance. Although already in a relationship with Gillian Wells, who is determined to marry him due to the urging of her mother, Ashley does not love her. With the help of his sister-in-law, Colette, and housekeeper Mrs Rudge, Ashley embarks on a series of dates to find a prospective partner.

== Cast ==
=== Main ===
- James Fleet as Ashley Parkerwell
- Jan Francis as Colette Parkerwell
- Anne Reid as Mrs Rudge
- Brigit Forsyth as Mrs Wells
- Rebecca Raybone as Gillian Wells

=== Recurring ===
- Alistair McGowan as Mike Parkerwell
- Julia Deakin as Ursula Craig
- Carla Mendonça as Beth

== Episodes ==
The series was broadcast at 8:30 pm on BBC One. It has never been repeated since its first broadcast run.

No.	Title	Directed by	Written by	Original release date
1	"Fourth Cousin Kimberley"	Angela de Chastelai Smith	Roy Clarke	10 November 1997
Guest starring Roger Brierley, Joan Sims, Roger Booth and Ian Burford.
2	"Beth"	Angela de Chastelai Smith	Roy Clarke	17 November 1997
Guest starring Guy Vincent and Christopher Armstrong.
3	"Beth Again"	Angela de Chastelai Smith	Roy Clarke	24 November 1997
Guest starring Mike Walling and Christopher Scoular.
4	"Ursula"	Angela de Chastelai Smith	Roy Clarke	1 December 1997
5	"Ursula... Sober This Time"	Angela de Chastelai Smith	Roy Clarke	8 December 1997
Guest starring Christopher Scoular, Peter Foster, Nigel Bradshaw and Michael Hobbs.
6	"The Girl at the Bull's Head"	Angela de Chastelai Smith	Roy Clarke	15 December 1997
Guest starring Bryan Lawrence and Philip Snipe.

== Production ==
The series was one of Roy Clarke's final television sitcoms, written at the same time Clarke was writing Last of the Summer Wine (1973–2010).

== Reception ==
The series was unsuccessful with the public and only lasted one series. The Independent's Thomas Sutcliffe drew comparisons between the series and the Woody Allen comedy film Play It Again, Sam (1972). Sutcliffe noted that Ashley's character is similar to the "klutzy but lovable sexual incompetent" Allen character, while Colette is similar to the Diane Keaton character, who attempts to help Ashley with his relationships. However, Sutcliffe noted that, despite the similarities, Ashley's character "seems to have a mental age of six" which causes viewers to "feel almost embarrassed to be in his company".

Marcus Berkmann, writing in The Spectator, was critical of Spark's premise, describing it as being an "old idea" that was "more grizzled" than the elderly characters in Last of the Summer Wine (1973–2010), the sitcom Roy Clarke was writing at the same time. Berkmann also criticised the "awful stereotypical" brother of Ashley, the several "allegedly hilarious" scrapes that Ashley finds himself in, and the bland minor characters, "northern grotesques who ramble on incessantly to fill time before the next scrape".

Mark Lewisohn, writing in the Radio Times Guide to TV Comedy, praised James Fleet's and Jan Francis's performances in the series, but noted that the plot "moved with the stately pace of the hearse that took away Ashley's mother in the opening episode". Though acknowledging that the series was "bittersweet" and "full of typically colourful Roy Clarke dialogue", Lewisohn noted that the series was "short on belly laughs and long (overlong, really) on whimsy and artful observation".
