= Peter Tilbury =

English actor and writer

- Born: Peter Tilbury; 20 October 1945 (age 80); Redruth, Cornwall, England
- Occupations: Actor; Writer
- Notable work: It Takes a Worried Man; Shelley

Peter Tilbury (born 20 October 1945) is a British actor and writer, best known for the sitcom It Takes a Worried Man (1981-4), which he created and starred in.

Tilbury was born in Redruth, Cornwall. As an actor, Tilbury's television appearances include The Shadow of the Tower (1972), Dixon of Dock Green (1974), Miss Marple ('Nemesis' episode) (1987), Fortunes of War (1987), Casualty (1989), The Bill (1990), Birds of a Feather (1990), and Chef! (1993).

He appeared in the film Breaking Glass (1980). The following year, in It Takes a Worried Man, he created the character of Philip Roath, who was approaching a midlife crisis. Other major characters in the series were his psychiatrist, played by Nicholas Le Prevost, his boss, played by Christopher Benjamin, and his girlfriend, played by Sue Holderness.

As a television writer, Tilbury's credits include Sorry, I'm a Stranger Here Myself, the first three series of Shelley, starring Hywel Bennett, and thirteen episodes of Chef! from 1993 to 1994, starring Lenny Henry, for which Tilbury was nominated for a BAFTA in 1994. He also wrote ten episodes of Birds of a Feather from 1990 to 1996, and three episodes of Not Going Out in 2007.

His play, Under the Doctor, starring Peter Davison and Anton Rodgers, opened at the Comedy Theatre in London in 2001. It received poor reviews and soon closed.
