= Cowboys (TV series) =

- Created by: Peter Learmouth
- Starring: Roy Kinnear; David Kelly; Colin Welland; James Wardroper; Debbie Linden; Janine Duvitski
- Country of origin: United Kingdom
- Original language: English
- No. of series: 2
- No. of episodes: 13

Production
- Producer: Thames
- Running time: 30 minutes

Original release
- Network: ITV
- Release: 3 September 1980 – 15 December 1981

Cowboys is a British television sitcom that aired on the ITV network during the early 1980s. The title refers to the British colloquial use of "cowboy" to describe a workman of doubtful professionalism e.g. a "cowboy builder".

== Overview ==
Roy Kinnear starred as Joe Jones, the hapless owner of a small building firm. His inept employees include 'Wobbly' Ron (David Kelly), Geyser (Colin Welland) and Eric (James Wardroper). Debbie Linden appeared in Series 1 as Doreen, with Janine Duvitski taking over as Muriel in Series 2.

The show was created by Peter Learmouth who would go on to create Granada television sitcoms Surgical Spirit and Let Them Eat Cake.

== Cast ==
- Roy Kinnear – Joe Jones
- David Kelly – Wobbly Ron
- Colin Welland – Geyser
- James Wardroper – Eric
- Debbie Linden – Doreen (series 1)
- Janine Duvitski – Muriel (series 2)

== Episodes ==
=== Series One (1980) ===
No.	Title	Original release date
1	"Ripping Out"	3 September 1980
2	"Perks"	10 September 1980
3	"Remember Honky Stubbs"	17 September 1980
4	"Black Day at Bad Rock"	24 September 1980
5	"C.L.O.D."	1 October 1980
6	"Two Right Casanovas"	8 October 1980

=== Series Two (1980-1981) ===
No.	Title	Original release date
1	"Was It Eddie Croucher?"	20 November 1980
2	"On Top of Old Smokey"	27 November 1980
3	"Bell, Book and Candle"	4 December 1980
4	"Hurricane Lesley"	11 December 1980
5	"Pieces of Hate"	18 December 1980
6	"Operation Douche"	8 December 1981
7	"Middle for Diddle"	15 December 1981

== DVD releases ==
DVD	Release date
The Complete Series 1	17 January 2011
The Complete Series 2	5 March 2012
