= Chef! =

- The show's title, formed from food prepared during the opening credits.
- Created by: Peter Tilbury (based on an idea from Lenny Henry)
- Starring: Lenny Henry; Caroline Lee-Johnson; Roger Griffiths
- Country of origin: United Kingdom
- Original language: English
- No. of series: 3
- No. of episodes: 20

Production
- Executive producer: Polly McDonald
- Producer: Crucial Films for the BBC
- Camera setup: Single-camera (series 1 and 2); Multi-camera (series 3)
- Running time: approx. 30 minutes

Original release
- Network: BBC1
- Release: 28 January 1993 – 30 December 1996

Chef! is a British sitcom starring Lenny Henry that aired as twenty episodes over three series from 28 January 1993 to 30 December 1996 on the BBC. The show was created and primarily written by Peter Tilbury based on an idea from Lenny Henry and produced for the BBC by Henry's production company, Crucial Films.

== Plot ==
Henry starred as Gareth Blackstock, a talented, arrogant, tyrannical and obsessed chef who has endlessly inventive insults for his staff, unknowing customers, and almost anyone else he encounters. Chef Blackstock's traditional French cuisine with an eclectic flair is served at "Le Château Anglais," a gourmet restaurant in the English countryside that is one of the few in the United Kingdom to receive a two-star rating from Michelin. The chef's quest for perfection and his lack of awareness about the costs of that perfection mean that the restaurant is on the brink of financial collapse when he and his wife Janice (played by Caroline Lee-Johnson) buy it early in the first series. The establishment mostly remains on that brink, despite Janice's best efforts as manager, eventually coming under the control of the boorish Cyril Bryson (Dave Hill) in the final series.

Although focused on the restaurant's kitchen, the countryside (with its black market suppliers) and the Blackstocks' home life are also backdrops for the show; the chef's long hours mean that Janice is routinely neglected in the bedroom, and their plans for a family remain delayed.

== Cast ==
Besides Gareth and Janice Blackstock, a third character, Everton Stonehead (played by Roger Griffiths), appears throughout all three series. Stonehead went to school with the chef and dreams of becoming a top chef himself. He bumbles through his early days in the kitchen, but eventually even develops a signature dish of his own.

== Production ==
According to Lenny Henry:

The first episode of Chef! was developed over two years, and so Peter Tilbury and I were really put through loads of hoops about character motivation. Why is this character such an arsehole? Is this the right kind of character for Lenny Henry to be playing? All that kind of stuff. Once we got through that and they greenlit the series, Peter then had something like eight or nine weeks to write the rest of it. The remaining five episodes were much easier to write because we'd had every argument about who, what, where, and how. The world had been mapped out. Actually, the very first episode of Chef! was the hardest one to watch for me because we'd worked so hard on it and you could see all the things that had been rewritten in the first episode.

Lenny Henry was coached in cooking techniques at the L'Ortolan Restaurant, in Shinfield, Reading, Berkshire. The restaurant was modelled on, and many scenes were filmed at, Le Manoir aux Quat' Saisons, a restaurant in Oxfordshire owned by chef Raymond Blanc. Many other scenes were filmed at Nether Winchendon House, in Buckinghamshire. The third series was shot at Teddington Studios in Middlesex. Celebrity chef John Burton Race acted as food consultant for the show.

The first two series were shot on film and directed in the style of a drama series, with the finished episodes shown to screening audiences.

Lenny Henry stated on his website that he and Tilbury had worked on a storyline for another series, but that nothing came of it.

== Episodes ==
=== Series 1 (1993) ===
No.	Title	Directed by	Written by	Original release date
1	"Personnel"	John Birkin	Peter Tilbury	28 January 1993
Gareth Blackstock is the executive chef at Le Chateau Anglais, and he is infuriated when management cuts his budget. He is one up on the budget when Everton shows up and volunteers his service as a chef for no compensation in order to train in the most famous kitchen in England.
2	"Beyond the Pass"	John Birkin	Peter Tilbury	4 February 1993
In order to make a successful takeover of the restaurant, Gareth and Janice must first make certain personal sacrifices before they grovel to the bank manager. This is no easy task for someone with a pathological hatred of bank managers.
3	"Subject to Contract"	John Birkin	Peter Tilbury	11 February 1993
Having made the ultimate sacrifice of putting their idyllic cottage on the market, Janice feels that Gareth must now set about raising his own public profile in the press... (Just a smiley picture...) To raise the profile of his restaurant, Gareth opens his kitchen to the press. But Everton has lost track of something very personal and rather unpleasant in the veal stew. Or was it in the pies? Or the ravioli?
4	"The Big Cheese"	John Birkin	Peter Tilbury	25 February 1993
Gareth discovers that famous chef Albert Roux is about to honour his restaurant with a visit. He tries to coax his troops into preparing the perfect meal. Gareth goes in search of the perfect unpasteurized English Stilton. But beware the Cheese Police!
5	"Fame Is the Spur"	John Birkin	Peter Tilbury	4 March 1993
Janice arranges for Gareth and Le Chateau to be featured in the television food program Kitchens Live. The producer has a few surprises in store for Gareth, and Everton manages to release 50 pounds of live crayfish in the kitchen.
6	"Rice and Peas"	John Birkin	Peter Tilbury	11 March 1993
Gareth has promised his father a Caribbean evening at Le Chateau. The trouble is, he knows nothing of Caribbean cuisine. Gareth must endure the ultimate indignity of requesting Everton's assistance in the matter.
7	"A Bird in the Hand"	John Birkin	Peter Tilbury	24 December 1993
A disagreement with his regular poultry supplier leads Gareth and Janice on a hunt for Christmas turkeys. This episode was originally a "stand alone" episode, having aired much later than the first six episodes of Series 1.

=== Series 2 (1994) ===
No.	Title	Directed by	Written by	Original release date
8	"A River Runs Thru It"	John Birkin	Peter Tilbury	8 September 1994
The kitchen staff at Le Chateau are overwhelmed, and Gareth simply must find another chef as soon as possible. The new addition to the kitchen staff (Gustav LaRoche) proves to be more than a handful for Gareth when it turns out that he prefers imbibing the wine rather than cooking with it.
9	"Time Flies"	John Birkin	Peter Tilbury	15 September 1994
Janice suspects that she may be pregnant and she insists that they seek outside investment to secure their offspring's future. Gareth's reaction is typically uncertain about both.
10	"Do the Right Thing"	John Birkin	Peter Tilbury	22 September 1994
Is there no end to the depths that Gareth will stoop to get the finest ingredients for his renowned dishes? Gareth deals with a "poacher" to get ingredients. But the long arm of the law is quickly in pursuit. Will Gareth land in the soup?
11	"A Diploma of Miseries"	John Birkin	Geoff Deane	29 September 1994
Publicity-shy Gareth is hounded by Janice to appear on a chat show, but she soon wishes she had never bothered. When Gareth bad-mouths Janice's cooking to the television audience, he might as well book in with Everton at the latter's new flat. Everton tries to teach his boss a few things about 'amour'.
12	"Masterchef"	John Birkin	Peter Tilbury	13 October 1994
Everton has developed his own signature dish and, much to Gareth's (very publicly displayed) irritation, he begins to hog the media spotlight!
13	"Private Lives"	John Birkin	Peter Tilbury	20 October 1994
The kitchen staff are having domestic troubles en masse and it's up to Gareth to play agony aunt, if only to get his staff back to work.
14	"England Expects"	John Birkin	Peter Tilbury	27 October 1994
Gareth enters an international cookery competition in Lyon, France. All the dishes must have ingredients exclusively from the originating country - but where will he get English wine?!?

=== Series 3 (1996) ===
No.	Title	Directed by	Written by	Original release date
15	"Gareth's True Love"	Dewi Humphreys	Geoff Deane	25 November 1996
Gareth has had to sell Le Chateau Anglais to Cyril Bryson. There's a troublesome new American chef named Savannah in the kitchen. Then Janice suddenly tells Gareth that she's leaving him, prompting him to resign in efforts to get her back.
16	"Reeny/Renée"	Dewi Humphreys	Paul Makin	2 December 1996
When Renée, Cyril's spoiled daughter arrives at the restaurant, Gareth is forced into letting her help out in the kitchen. Everton is smitten by Renée and will do anything to keep her from being removed from her position.
17	"Lessons in Talking"	Dewi Humphreys	Paul Makin	9 December 1996
With Janice having moved out on him and with talk of divorce in the air, Gareth takes his temper out on the diners when Cyril has made a policy decision that Gareth should mingle and chat with the clientele at Le Chateau. This is decidedly not what Gareth would prefer.
18	"Love in the Air"	Dewi Humphreys	Geoff Deane	16 December 1996
The arrival of Gareth's father is not the tonic he needs to help him overcome his failed marriage, especially when he brings along his new, very attractive and very young, girlfriend.
19	"Rochelle"	Dewi Humphreys	Geoff Deane	23 December 1996
Everton talks Gareth into catering for his cousin's wedding. One of the guests is one of Gareth's ex-girlfriends, Rochelle. An old flame looks like being rekindled, until Janice makes an unexpected appearance.
20	"Paris? Jamaica?"	Dewi Humphreys	Paul Makin	30 December 1996
In this final episode, Gareth is at a cross road. He must decide whether to accept Rochelle's invitation to join her in Paris for the weekend or to fly off to Jamaica to try to patch things up with Janice. Gareth foolishly relies upon the advice of Everton to help him make a decision on his future.

== Reception ==
According to the Museum of Broadcast Communications, the show was "highly critically acclaimed for its high production values, its comic-drama scripts, and its lead performances. Most of all, perhaps, the series [was] a landmark programme in the sense that Henry plays a character who just happens to be black; the fact of his blackness does not limit the narrative or the audience the series reaches."

BFI's screenonline noted that "what really marked out Chef!, however, was Henry's development as an actor. As the kitchen tyrant Gareth Blackstock, he proved himself capable of representing a multifaceted character far beyond the caricatures of his sketch shows." It also noted that Chef! "managed some acute observations on food and contemporary Britain: the celebritisation of cuisine, the pathological obsession with hygiene, the near impossibility of securing genuinely excellent produce in a culture dominated by industrial farming and supermarket giants."

Some contemporary critics were less positive, however. Reviewing the second series in the Evening Standard, Victor Lewis-Smith described it as "...not funny enough to be classed as sit-com, nor believable enough to be classed as drama, forensic science has been unable to detect any trace of humour or subtlety in this dismal hybrid".

== Home release ==
All three series were released on Region 1 DVD on 30 August 2005. The Region 2 DVDs have been available since 2 October 2006. Several minutes of the first series episode "The Big Cheese" were missing from the Region 2 DVD release. This was due to a mastering error; corrected replacement discs were later offered by the BBC. The Region 1 release is full and uncut.
