= The Return of the Musketeers =

- Theatrical release poster by Steven Chorney
- Directed by: Richard Lester
- Written by: George MacDonald Fraser
- Based on: Twenty Years After; 1845 novel by Alexandre Dumas
- Produced by: Michelle de Broca; Pierre Spengler
- Starring: Michael York; Oliver Reed; Frank Finlay; C. Thomas Howell; Kim Cattrall
- Cinematography: Bernard Lutic
- Edited by: John Victor Smith
- Music by: Jean-Claude Petit
- Production company: Falconfilms
- Distributed by: Entertainment Film Distributors (UK); Universal (US)
- Release dates: 19 April 1989 (France); 25 August 1989 (United Kingdom)
- Running time: 102 minutes
- Countries: United Kingdom; France; Spain
- Language: English

The Return of the Musketeers is a 1989 film adaptation loosely based on the novel Twenty Years After (1845) by Alexandre Dumas. It is the third Musketeers film directed by Richard Lester, following 1973's The Three Musketeers and 1974's The Four Musketeers. Like the previous two films, the screenplay was written by George MacDonald Fraser.

It stars Michael York, Oliver Reed, Frank Finlay (reprising their roles), C. Thomas Howell and Kim Cattrall. Richard Chamberlain returns in a special appearance. Geraldine Chaplin, Roy Kinnear and Christopher Lee also reprise their roles. The character of Mordaunt, Milady de Winter's son in the original novel, is replaced by Milady's daughter, Justine de Winter (Catrall's character). Jean-Pierre Cassel, who played Louis XIII in the original films, has a cameo appearance as Cyrano de Bergerac.

While filming in September 1988, character actor Roy Kinnear died following an on-camera accident in which he fell off a horse.

== Plot ==
In 1649 (twenty years after the events of The Four Musketeers), Royalty in Europe are troubled by events in England, fearing that the overthrow of King Charles I by Oliver Cromwell's forces might encourage their own subjects to rebel against them. In France, boy-King Louis XIV is enthroned, but his mother, Queen Anne, and her lover, the greedy Cardinal Mazarin, rule the nation. Together, they imprison the Duke of Beaufort, leader of the people's party, the Fronde, which splits the country into warring factions. Families and old friends support opposing leaders; Beaufort or Mazarin. Even the Musketeers are divided, which strains their camaraderie. Mazarin hires d'Artagnan to bring together Athos, Porthos, and Aramis, to work for him. Porthos accepts, but Athos and Aramis decline. By this time, Athos has a son named Raoul.

Milady de Winter's daughter, Justine, captures and questions the executioner that the musketeers hired to kill her mother. After finding out that "Comte de la Fere" hired him, she kills him. Raoul happens upon the aftermath of this event and chases after Justine, who is disguised as a priest. After a swordfight, when he discovers who she really is and her plan, Raoul leaves and tells d'Artagnan, Porthos, and Athos that Justine wants to kill them.

Comte de Rochefort is unable to prevent Beaufort from escaping from his prison, and he is subsequently arrested by Mazarin. Mazarin sends d'Artagnan and Porthos after Beaufort, but Beaufort escapes them due to interference from Athos and Aramis, who are working for Beaufort. This starts a fight amongst the Musketeers, in which d'Artagnan slices Aramis' hand. Aramis breaks his sword and rides away. d'Artagnan and Porthos are fired by Mazarin for not catching Beaufort.

Rochefort, who has survived his near-fatal clash with d'Artagnan in the previous film and has gone into hiding, finds Justine (his daughter) and tells her the names of d'Artagnan, Porthos, and Aramis, revealing to her that the Comte de la Fere is Athos. King Charles I of England is to be executed, so Queen Anne of Austria sends d'Artagnan, Athos, Porthos, and Raoul to rescue him. They attempt a rescue by knocking out the executioner, but Justine takes his place and beheads Charles.

The Musketeers have several encounters with Justine: in one, Raoul's true allegiance is revealed to her; in another, Justine and Rochefort attempt to kill the Musketeers by blowing up their ship. The Musketeers notice their trap, set their own bomb and escape. Rochefort is killed when the ship explodes, but Justine escapes.

Justine attempts to kill King Louis XIV, but is stopped by the Musketeers, and their battle concludes with Justine jumping out of the window into the water. Aramis rejoins the Musketeers, and they force Mazarin to sign several forms in favour of them, including making Porthos a baron, Aramis a bishop, and Raoul being commissioned into the Guards. The film ends with the Musketeers riding together again.

== Cast ==
- Michael York as d'Artagnan
- Oliver Reed as Athos
- Frank Finlay as Porthos
- C. Thomas Howell as Raoul
- Kim Cattrall as Justine de Winter
- Geraldine Chaplin as Anne of Austria
- Roy Kinnear as Planchet
- Christopher Lee as the Comte de Rochefort
- Philippe Noiret as Cardinal Mazarin
- Richard Chamberlain as Aramis
- Eusebio Lázaro as the Duke of Beaufort
- Alan Howard as Oliver Cromwell
- David Birkin as Louis XIV
- Bill Paterson as Charles I
- Jean-Pierre Cassel as Cyrano de Bergerac
- Billy Connolly as Caddie
- Pat Roach as French Executioner
- Leon Greene as Captain Groslow
- Ágata Lys as Duchesse de Longueville
- Bob Todd as High Bailiff
- Aldo Sambrell as Burly Demonstrator
- Jack Taylor as Gentleman on Horseback
- Ricardo Palacios as Jailer
- Luciano Federico as Tall Lackey

== Production ==
The Return of the Musketeers was filmed in Spain. It was Richard Lester's first movie in four years. It reunited him with the main cast of the first two films.

Author George MacDonald Fraser said that in the film "Charles I is seen playing golf, which is, incidentally, true. He was playing golf just before he was captured."

Lester said the two main problems with the film were a lack of money, and a refusal of the Salkinds to let him use footage from the first two films. "The whole concept of making Dumas' Twenty Years After was destroyed," said Lester. "It was the hole beneath the water line." However Lester did admit even that may not have worked as the target audience were unlikely to have been familiar with the original films.

Charlton Heston was hoping to be asked to reprise his role as Cardinal Richelieu from the original films but the cardinal had died several years before the events of the new movie. Heston did give the filmmakers permission to use a painting of Richelieu that featured his likeness—provided he was given the painting once filming ended. "It's a good portrait," wrote Heston. "I'm very fond of it. It's very much in the style of the period."

Kim Cattrall was in London for dubbing in December 1988. She had planned to fly to New York on the 21st but decided to take a different flight 45 minutes after the one she had planned to fly due to realizing she had forgotten to buy a teapot for her mother. The flight she missed, Pan Am Flight 103 was soon destroyed by a bomb over Lockerbie.

=== Death of Roy Kinnear ===
Roy Kinnear was accidentally killed during production in Toledo, Spain. The Spanish crew misunderstood the instructions of director Lester when it came to putting sand on the cobblestone street before filming in the belief that it would create more grip. Kinnear and other cast members had to travel on horses across the Puente de Alcántara above the river Tagus. Kinnear was given one fifteen-minute practice ride before the take.

When Kinnear and other cast members rode into the shot on horses and stopped, Kinnear's horse slipped, and Kinnear (not a confident horseman) fell off, breaking his pelvis. He was treated at the Ruber Internacional Hospital in Madrid and on 20 September was transferred to a nearby clinic but died soon after from a heart attack brought on by his injuries. Kinnear's role was completed by using a body double, filmed from the rear, and dubbed-in lines from a voice artist.

Following a six-year legal battle Kinnear's widow was awarded £650,000 in damages from the production company, Falconfilms—consisting of producer Pierre Spengler and director Richard Lester. A court later ruled that the hospital was 60% liable for his death and ordered them to pay 60% of the payout figure.

== Release ==
Completed in 1988, The Return of the Musketeers was released for cinemas in the European market in April 1989, and while it was given positive reviews by critics, it was not well received at the box office. It was released on video in the spring of 1990. The film was acquired by Universal for U.S. theatrical release, but given its lacklustre European box office, the studio chose instead to give the film its U.S. debut on cable television's USA Network (which was partly owned by the studio) two years later, on 3 April 1991.

Years later in a career interview, Lester said, "I really won't talk about The Return of the Musketeers...I never have and I won't now. But I think you can draw your own conclusions."

== Reception ==
The Return of the Musketeers received mixed reviews: the online review aggregator Rotten Tomatoes currently rates it at 60%, based on five reviews.

== See also ==
- The Three Musketeers in film
