= Roy Kinnear =

English character actor (1934–1988)

- Born: 8 January 1934; Wigan, Lancashire, England
- Died: 20 September 1988 (aged 54); Madrid, Spain
- Resting place: East Sheen Cemetery, London, England
- Education: Royal Academy of Dramatic Art
- Occupations: Actor; comedian
- Years active: 1955–1988
- Spouse: Carmel Cryan (m. 1970)
- Children: 3, including Rory Kinnear

Roy Mitchell Kinnear (8 January 1934 – 20 September 1988) was an English character actor and comedian. He was known for playing Algernon in the Beatles' Help! (1965), Clapper in How I Won the War (1967), Henry Salt in Willy Wonka & the Chocolate Factory (1971), and Planchet in The Three Musketeers (1973) and its two sequels. On television, Kinnear starred in No Appointment Necessary (BBC 1977), The Dick Emery Show (1979–1981), Man About the House (1974–1975), George and Mildred (1976–1979), and Cowboys (1980–1981).

== Early life ==
Kinnear was born on 8 January 1934 in Wigan, Lancashire, the son of Annie (née Durie, previously Smith) and Roy Kinnear. He had a sister, Marjory. His parents were Scottish, originally from Edinburgh. His father was an international in both rugby union and rugby league, having played for Scotland and Great Britain; he scored 81 tries in 184 games for Wigan. He collapsed and died while playing rugby union with the RAF in 1942 at the age of 38. Scotland Rugby League have named their Student Player of the Year Award after him.

Kinnear was educated at George Heriot's School in Edinburgh. Aged 17, he enrolled in the Royal Academy of Dramatic Art. This was cut short by his call up for National service, for which he served in the army for two years, returning to RADA to complete his education in acting, graduating in 1955.

== Career ==
Kinnear's acting career began in 1955, playing Albert in The Young in Heart, at the repertory theatre, Newquay. In 1959 he joined Joan Littlewood's Theatre Workshop at the Theatre Royal Stratford East, performing in both the 1960 play and 1963 film of Sparrows Can't Sing.

Kinnear's television debut was on the STV children's series Mr. Fixit in 1959, before gaining national attention as a participant in the television show That Was the Week That Was.

Kinnear later appeared in many films and television shows, including Till Death Us Do Part, Doctor at Large, Man About the House, George and Mildred, The Dick Emery Show (as Gaylord's long-suffering father) and four episodes of The Avengers. He starred in Cowboys, a sitcom about builders. His best-known films are those he made with director and close friend Richard Lester: Help!, A Funny Thing Happened On the Way to the Forum, How I Won the War, The Bed Sitting Room, Juggernaut and the Musketeer series of the 1970s and 1980s.

He appeared with Christopher Lee in the Hammer horror film Taste the Blood of Dracula (1970). Also in 1970 he played Mr. Perkins, Melody's father in Waris Hussein's Melody (1971), a puppy love story. He played the father of spoiled rich girl Veruca Salt in the film Willy Wonka & the Chocolate Factory (1971), an adaptation of Roald Dahl's children's novel Charlie and the Chocolate Factory.

He guest-starred as the Roman Emperor in episode "Rome Antics", in The Goodies (1975), and as the fearsome German Sergeant Vogel in the BBC's Ripping Yarns episode "Escape From Stalag Luft 112B" (1977).

He narrated and provided voices for the stop-motion children's television show Bertha. He appeared in two music videos for Mike and the Mechanics ("All I Need Is a Miracle" and "Taken In") as the band's manager; in the former, he was reunited with his Help! co-star Victor Spinetti.

He narrated Towser (1990-1991), and voiced Pipkin in the animated film Watership Down (1978), and voiced Texas Pete's henchman Bulk in SuperTed (also with Victor Spinetti, who voiced the evil Texas Pete). Kinnear appeared regularly on the stage. In later life he appeared in productions such as The Travails of Sancho Panza (playing the title role), and in The Cherry Orchard, in 1985.

His final completed roles were in A Man for All Seasons (1988), a made-for-television film directed by and starring Charlton Heston, John Gielgud and Vanessa Redgrave, as a patient in the BBC One hospital drama Casualty, and a voice role as Mump in The Princess and the Goblin (1992), four years after his sudden death in September 1988. Following his death, the Casualty episode was postponed, and not aired until August 1989. In October 1988 Radio 4 first broadcast The T Machine, an episode of the comedy series The Fall of the Mausoleum Club in which he played the lead character, Mr Tilly.

== Personal life and death ==
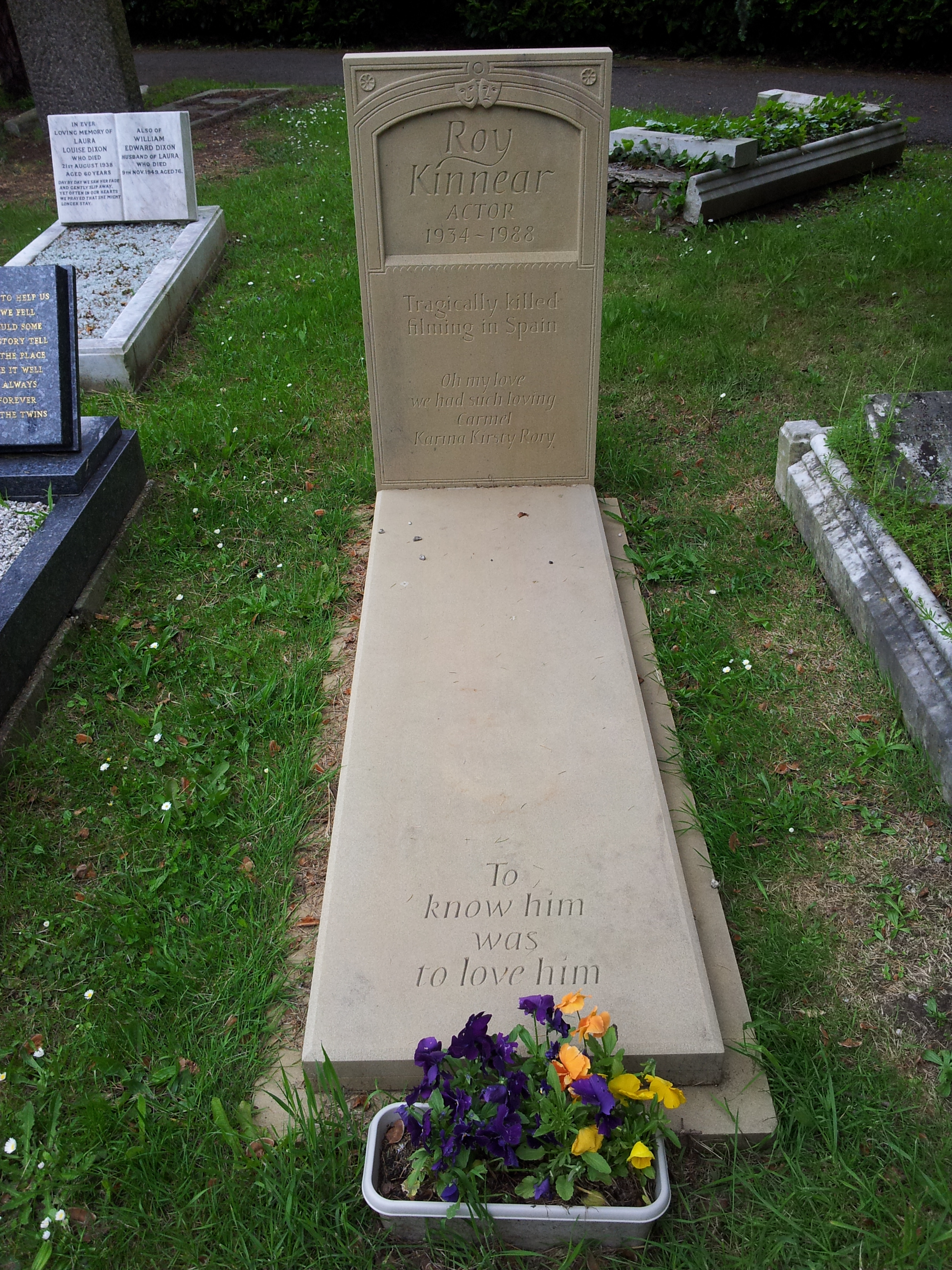
Roy Kinnear's grave in East Sheen Cemetery, London

Kinnear was married to actress Carmel Cryan, and they had three children, including actor Rory.

On 19 September 1988, Kinnear fell from a horse while filming The Return of the Musketeers in Toledo, Spain, sustaining a broken pelvis and internal bleeding. He died the following day, at age 54, in Ruber International Hospital in Madrid, from a heart attack brought on by his injuries. Kinnear was buried in East Sheen Cemetery, London. Following his death, Kinnear's family sued the film's production company and director, Richard Lester, receiving a £650,000 settlement in 1991.

== Legacy ==
In May 1994, the Roy Kinnear Trust, which was inspired by his daughter, Karina, was founded to help improve the life of young adults with physical and mental disabilities.

== Shows ==
- The Roy Kinnear Show
- The Clairvoyant

== Filmography ==
Year	Title	Role	Notes
1944	The World Owes Me a Living		Uncredited
1955	Oh... Rosalinda!!		
1960	The Millionairess	Man Carrying Crate	Uncredited
1962	Tiara Tahiti	Capt. Enderby	
1962	The Boys	Bus Conductor	Uncredited
1963	Sparrows Can't Sing	Fred	
1963	The Small World of Sammy Lee	Lucky Dave	
1963	Heavens Above!	Fred Smith	
1963	The Informers	Shorty	
1964	French Dressing	Henry Liggott	
1964	A Place to Go	Bunting	
1965	The Hill	Monty Bartlett	
1965	Help!	Algernon	
1966	A Funny Thing Happened on the Way to the Forum	Gladiator Instructor	
1967	The Deadly Affair	Adam Scarr	
1967	How I Won the War	Clapper	
1968	The Mini-Affair	Fire Extinguisher Salesman	
1969	Lock Up Your Daughters	Sir Tunbelly Clumsey	
1969	The Bed Sitting Room	Plastic mac man	
1970	Taste the Blood of Dracula	Weller	
1970	On A Clear Day You Can See Forever	Prince Regent	
1970	Scrooge	2nd Gentleman of Charity	
1971	The Firechasers	Roscoe	
1971	Melody	Mr. Perkins	
1971	Willy Wonka & the Chocolate Factory	Henry Salt	
1972	The Pied Piper	Burgermaster Poppendick	
1972	The Alf Garnett Saga	Wally	
1972	Raising the Roof	Dad Burke	
1972	Alice's Adventures in Wonderland	Cheshire Cat	
1973	The Three Musketeers	Planchet	
1974	The Four Musketeers	Planchet	
1974	Juggernaut	Social Director Curtain	
1974	Barry McKenzie Holds His Own	Bishop of Paris	
1975	Royal Flash		Scene deleted
1975	The Amorous Milkman	Sergeant	
1975	Eskimo Nell	Benny U. Murdoch	
1975	Three for All	Hounslow Joe	
1975	One of Our Dinosaurs Is Missing	Superintendent Grubbs	
1975	The Adventure of Sherlock Holmes' Smarter Brother	Moriarty's Assistant	
1976	Not Now, Comrade	Hoskins	
1977	Herbie Goes to Monte Carlo	Quincey	
1977	No Appointment Necessary	Manager	
1977	The Last Remake of Beau Geste	Boldini	
1978	The Hound of the Baskervilles	Selden the Axe Murderer	
1978	Watership Down	Pipkin	
1979	Quincy's Quest	Top	
1980	High Rise Donkey	Mr. Garnett	
1980	Hawk the Slayer	Innkeeper	
1982	Hammett	English Eddie Hagedorn	
1982	Return of the Ewok	Talent Agent	Short
1983	Anna Pavlova	Gardener	
1983	The Boys in Blue	Mr. Lloyd	
1986	Pirates	Dutch	
1988	Just Ask for Diamond	Jack Splendide	
1989	The Return of the Musketeers	Planchet	
1991	The Princess and the Goblin	Mump	

== Television ==
Year	Title	Role	Notes
1961	Armchair Theatre	Douglas MacIntyre	Episode: "The Conscientious Gauger"
1963	BBC Sunday-Night Play	Bruce	Episode: "A Right Crusader"
1963	ITV Television Playhouse	Sgt. Buzfuz	Episode: "Mr. Pickwick"
1963-1969	The Avengers	Various	3 episodes
1964-1965	A World of His Own	Stanley Blake	
1970	His and Hers	Mr. Moulding	Episode: "Crime"
1971-1977	Play for Today	Various	3 episodes
1971-1983	Jackanory	Storyteller	4 stories
1972	Madame Sin	Holidaymaker	TV film
1973-1976	Man About the House	Jerry	3 episodes
1973-1981	The Dick Emery Show	Various	11 episodes
1975	The Sweeney	Frank Little	Episode: "I Want the Man"
1976-1979	George and Mildred	Jerry	5 episodes
1977	Ripping Yarns	Vogel	Episode: "Escape from Stalag Luft 112 B"
1979	The London Connection	Bidley	TV film
1980-1981	Cowboys	Joe Jones	
1980	Rhubarb Rhubarb	Home Owner	TV film
1980	Metal Mickey	Wilf	Episode: "Mickey in Love"
1981	If You Go Down in the Woods Today	Fishfingers	TV film
1981	Dick Turpin	Clanton	Episode: "Dick's Greatest Adventure Part 2"
1981	Blake's 7	Keiller	Episode: "Gold"
1981	The Incredible Mr Tanner	Sidney Pratt	
1982	Anyone for Denis?	Boris	TV special
1983-1986	SuperTed	Bulk	
1984	The Zany Adventures of Robin Hood	Friar Tuck	TV film
1984-1986	The Clairvoyant	Arnold Bristow	Pilot
1985-1986	Bertha	Narrator /Ted/Roy	
1985	Super Gran	Chistleton football manager	Episode: "Super Gran and the Super Match"
1986	The Sooty Show	Spider-Man's Assistant	Episode: "Moths"
1987	Hardwicke House	R. G. Wickham/Mr. Wickham	
1987	Casanova	Balbi	TV film
1987	Boon	Mr. Beamish	Episode: "Wheels of Fortune"
1988	The Ray Bradbury Theater	Funeral Home Director	Episode: "There Was an Old Woman"
1988	Casualty	Brian McCarthy	Episode: "A Wing and a Prayer"
1988	A Man for All Seasons	The Common Man	TV film
1989	Minder	Fat Charlie	Episode: "It's a Sorry Lorry Morrie"

== Theatre (partial) ==
- Make Me an Offer, Theatre Royal Stratford East, October 1959 – 18th June 1960.
- Sparrers Can't Sing, Theatre Royal Stratford East + Wyndham's Theatre 1960.
- They Might Be Giants, Theatre Royal Stratford East, 28 June – 22 July 1961.
- The Clandestine Marriage, Theatre Royal, Bath, 1983 – 1984.
- The Real Inspector Hound, Royal National Theatre, 1985 – 1986.
- The Travails of Sancho Panza
- The Cherry Orchard
- The Duchess of Malfi
- Cinderella
