= It Takes a Worried Man =

- Created by: Peter Tilbury
- Directed by: Anthony Parker (series 1–2); Douglas Argent (series 3)
- Starring: Peter Tilbury
- Country of origin: United Kingdom
- No. of series: 3
- No. of episodes: 19

Production
- Producers: Anthony Parker Series 1 and 2. Douglas Argent Series 3.
- Running time: 30 minutes
- Production company: Thames Television

Original release
- Network: ITV (series 1–2); Channel 4 (series 3)
- Release: 27 October 1981 – 20 November 1983

It Takes a Worried Man is a British TV sitcom. It was made by Thames Television and ran for three series, broadcast from October 1981 to November 1983. The first two series were broadcast on the ITV network, and the third and final series on Channel 4. Most episodes were written by the star, Peter Tilbury, who played office worker Philip Roath. The other writers were Bernard McKenna, Barry Pilton and Colin Bostock-Smith. The title comes from a line in the folk song Worried Man Blues. The series was based on the writings about the male menopause by novelist Philip Roth, after whom Tilbury named the main character. He also took inspiration from his own life for the character of Roath.

== Premise ==
Philip Roath is a middle-aged and divorced office worker who is highly intelligent, but suffering a midlife crisis, and completely bored with his job. He is never seen doing any actual work, just conversing with his colleagues about his boredom and frustrations with life. His boss suspects that Philip does little work, but is powerless to prove it or to do anything about it. Philip is also seen in psychoanalysis sessions with his analyst, Simon, who has worse emotional issues than Philip does.

== Cast list ==
- Peter Tilbury – Philip Roath
- Sue Holderness – Liz (Series 2-3)
- Diana Payan – Ruth
- Andrew Tourell – Napley
- Nicholas Le Prevost – Simon
- Christopher Benjamin – The Old Man (Philip's Boss)
- Angela Down – Lillian (Series 1)

== Episodes ==
=== Series 1 (1981) ===
No. overall	No. in series	Title	Original release date
1	1	"Endangered Species"	27 October 1981
2	2	"As You Like It"	3 November 1981
3	3	"New Leaf"	10 November 1981
4	4	"Mixed Feelings"	17 November 1981
5	5	"Frankly Speaking"	24 November 1981
6	6	"Soul Mates"	1 December 1981

=== Series 2 (1983) ===
No. overall	No. in series	Title	Original release date
7	1	"Aren't Our Policemen Wonderful?"	13 January 1983
8	2	"At First the Infant"	20 January 1983
9	3	"Night and Day"	27 January 1983
10	4	"Listening In"	3 February 1983
11	5	"Personnel"	10 February 1983
12	6	"Pros and Cons"	17 February 1983
13	7	"Scenes From Country Life"	24 February 1983

=== Series 3 (1983) ===
No. overall	No. in series	Title	Original release date
14	1	"Seasonally Adjusted"	16 October 1983
15	2	"Naughty But Nice"	23 October 1983
16	3	"Getaway"	30 October 1983
17	4	"Do Me a Favour"	6 November 1983
18	5	"Annually, Once a Year"	13 November 1983
19	6	"Three Cheers"	20 November 1983

== DVD Release ==
All three series of It Takes a Worried Man have been released individually on DVD by Network. In 2024, a complete boxset was released by Old Gold Media.

DVD	Release date
The Complete Series 1	31 October 2011
The Complete Series 2	25 February 2013
The Complete Series 3	14 October 2013
The Complete Series 1 to 3 Boxset	2024 Old Gold Media
