= Dial M for Murder! =

Swedish band

- Origin: London / Oslo / Halmstad / Stockholm; Sweden
- Genres: Indie rock Electro; Post-punk revival
- Years active: 2007–present
- Labels: Tapete Records
- Members: David Ortenlöf; Anders Lantto
- Website: Myspace

Dial M for Murder! is a Swedish indie/post punk band that was formed in late 2007 by David Alexander Ortenlöf and Anders Lantto.

In the beginning of 2008 they started to perform at home parties. Thanks to their energetic performances it did not take long until the band had got a lot of attention.

The band was soon noticed by several record labels that were interested in making a deal. They finally signed with the German label Tapete Records.

Their first single "Oh no!" was released in November 2008 and in August 2009 they released their debut album Fiction of her dreams which was critically acclaimed. The album was followed up with some touring in Europe

== Releases ==
- Oh no! 7" (November 7, 2008, Tapete Records)
- Fiction of her dreams (August 14, 2009, Tapete Records)
