= Just Good Friends =

British TV sitcom (1983–1986)

- Genre: Sitcom
- Created by: John Sullivan
- Starring: Paul Nicholas; Jan Francis; Sylvia Kay; John Ringham
- Theme music composer: John Sullivan
- Country of origin: United Kingdom
- Original language: English
- No. of series: 3
- No. of episodes: 22

Production
- Running time: 30 minutes

Original release
- Network: BBC1
- Release: 22 September 1983 – 25 December 1986

Just Good Friends is a British sitcom written by John Sullivan. It stars Paul Nicholas and Jan Francis as former lovers Vincent Pinner and Penny Warrender, who meet in a pub five years after he jilted her at the altar.

Three series and a 90-minute Christmas special were produced for the BBC by Ray Butt. In 2004, it came 43rd in Britain's Best Sitcom.

== Background ==
Writer John Sullivan had previously written two successful sitcoms for the BBC, Citizen Smith and Only Fools and Horses. The lead roles in these series had all been male, and Sullivan decided he would base his new sitcom on a woman. His source of inspiration was a letter in a magazine read to him by his wife, written by a woman who had been jilted by her fiancé on the day of her wedding.

According to a 2007 Comedy Connections documentary on Just Good Friends, Sullivan was originally motivated to create the character by Cheryl Hall, the co-star of Citizen Smith. Hall complained that Sullivan was incapable of writing comedy for women, always giving the best of his material to the male characters. Sullivan was stung by the remark because, in his words, "she was absolutely right", and deliberately set out to create a strong and funny female lead.

Jan Francis, who had played Lisa Colbert in Secret Army, was cast as Penny, and established theatre actor Paul Nicholas was chosen to play Vincent, although this was his first major television role. Being a notable singer, Nicholas also performed the title theme song, written by John Sullivan and arranged by Ronnie Hazlehurst. For the end title music, Hazlehurst arranged the theme for flugelhorn.

== Plot ==
The series follows the wavering relationship between two people, Penny Warrender, a secretary for an advertising firm, and Vincent Pinner, an ex-ice cream salesman turned bookmaker who is the son of a wealthy scrap metal merchant. The couple (who first met in the summer of 1976 at a party) parted when Vincent jilted Penny on their wedding day in June 1978. In the pilot episode, five years since their intended wedding day, the pair meet again by chance in a pub while out on individual dates. The pair decide to forget the past and become friends, although the rekindling of their relationship is not welcomed by Penny's parents, particularly her mother, Daphne, played by Sylvia Kay.

The 1984 90-minute Christmas special is a prequel to the series, showing how Penny and Vince first met and fell in love, and how Penny was jilted by Vince and married Graham. The last episode of the second series was intended to be the final episode, with Penny leaving for a job in Paris.

The cast reunited in 1986 for a further seven episodes, in which Penny and Vince meet up in Paris two years after they had split up. Penny is now divorced and Vince is married; the couple renew their relationship and Vince, now a successful businessman, gives up everything for a quick divorce to pay off his wife Gina so he can be with Penny. In the final episode, Vince is still recovering from his painful divorce when his father pays a visit. Vince is told that unless he calls the wedding off, a lucrative wine export contract cannot be signed: Gina's way of blackmailing the Pinners by hitting where it hurts. Similarly, Penny is told that unless she calls the wedding off, her father's new job may not happen and at work, she is offered a permanent basing in Paris, all because Gina Marshall (Vince's ex) is too important a client to turn down. Eventually, Penny accepts the new posting but uses it to her advantage by returning to Paris and marrying Vince at the town hall.

== Cast ==
=== Main ===
- Paul Nicholas as Vincent Pinner
- Jan Francis as Penny Warrender
- John Ringham as Norman Warrender
- Sylvia Kay as Daphne Warrender
- Shaun Curry as Les Pinner
- Ann Lynn as Rita Pinner
- Adam French as Clifford Pinner

=== Recurring ===
- Charlotte Seely as Georgina "Gina" Marshall, Vince's wife (Series 3)
- Colette Gleeson as Elaine, Penny's friend and co-worker
- James Lister as Lennie, Vince's friend
- Bill Wallis as A.J. Styles, Penny's boss
- Sally Faulkner as Bev, Vince's secretary (Series 3)
- Andrew Tourell as Graham Pratt, Penny's husband
- Derek Newark as Eddie Brown, Vince's boss

== Episodes ==
=== Series 1 (1983) ===
No.	Title	Original release date
1	"After All This Time"	22 September 1983
2	"Hello Again"	29 September 1983
3	"Let’s Spend the Night Together"	6 October 1983
4	"Fatherly Advice"	13 October 1983
5	"I Don’t Want to See You Again"	20 October 1983
6	"Happy Birthday, Penny"	27 October 1983
7	"Moving In… And Out Again"	3 November 1983

=== Series 2 (1984) ===
No.	Title	Original release date
8	"Guilt"	7 October 1984
9	"Another Man"	14 October 1984
10	"The Evidence/ His Bottle Went"	21 October 1984
11	"Caught on a Shoulder Strap"	28 October 1984
12	"Farewell Holiday"	4 November 1984
13	"Pregnant?"	11 November 1984
14	"Goodbye Again"	18 November 1984

=== Christmas Special (1984) ===
No.	Title	Original release date
15	"Special"	25 December 1984

=== Series 3 (1986) ===
No.	Title	Original release date
16	"Paris"	13 November 1986
17	"Back in London"	20 November 1986
18	"Meeting By Chance"	27 November 1986
19	"Juanita"	4 December 1986
20	"The Witness"	11 December 1986
21	"Employment Prospects"	18 December 1986
22	"The Wedding"	25 December 1986

== Awards & nominations ==
Year	Award	Category	Nominee(s)	Result	Ref.
1985	British Academy Television Awards	Best Comedy Series	Just Good Friends	Nominated	
1985	British Academy Television Awards	Best Light Entertainment Performance	Paul Nicholas	Nominated	
1987	British Academy Television Awards	Best Comedy Series	Just Good Friends	Won	

== Home releases ==
The first two series had been released in a joint boxset in the UK under the Universal Playback label. However, these were edited due to music clearance rights. The third series was not released. In 2008, Cinema Club bought the rights to the series and were to re-release series one and two in June 2009, with series three to follow. These were later cancelled.

DVD company Eureka bought the rights to the series and released the complete collection on 25 October 2010 "containing all three series including the 1984 Christmas Special". Unfortunately copyright clearance could not be obtained for all the music included in the Christmas Special, and as Eureka "could not isolate and remove the music alone" they "had to replace that portion of the programme's soundtrack and feature the dialogue in subtitles" feeling this was "a better option than cutting out the scene in its entirety".
