= Carmel Cryan =

British actress (born 1949)

- Born: 8 July 1949 (age 77); London, England
- Occupation: Actress
- Years active: 1963–present
- Spouse: Roy Kinnear (m. 1970; died 1988)
- Children: 3, including Rory Kinnear

Carmel Cryan (born 8 July 1949) is an English actress, known for the role of Brenda Boyle in the BBC soap opera EastEnders. She is the widow of the actor Roy Kinnear (1934–1988).

== Life and career ==
Cryan was born in London. She was married to the actor Roy Kinnear until his death in 1988. They had three children together, including Rory Kinnear, who is also an actor; and Kirsty, who works as a casting assistant. The couple's elder daughter, Karina (1972–2020), who was born quadriplegic and had learning difficulties, died from COVID-19. In May 2014 Cryan was appointed as a trustee to Choice Support, a charitable trust that provides care to disabled people and people with learning disabilities.

In June 2008, she was cast as Brenda Boyle in EastEnders, a love interest for Charlie Slater (actor Derek Martin). She signed a six-month contract in August 2008. Cryan was written out of EastEnders in August 2009 when Brenda emigrated to Madeira with Charlie.

== Acting roles ==
| Year | Title | Role | Notes |
|---|---|---|---|
| 1963 | The Rag Trade | Gloria | 11 episodes |
| 1966 | Thirty-Minute Theatre | Rose | |
| 1969 | Fraud Squad | | |
| 1970 | Beyond Belief | | |
| 1970 | Catweazle | Audrey | |
| 1970 | Steptoe and Son | Muriel | |
| 1970-1972 | His and Hers | Vanessa Hooker / Philippa Gutteridge | 2 episodes |
| 1971 | The Magnificent Seven Deadly Sins | Vera | |
| 1972 | Nearest and Dearest | Sabrina Clegg | |
| 1972 | Nearest and Dearest (film) | Club Hostess | |
| 1972 | There Was An Englishman, Irishman & A Scotsman | Barmaid | |
| 1975 | Within These Walls | Mrs. Flower | |
| 1981 | Partners | Gladys | |
| 1986 | The Whistle Blower | Frank's Secretary | |
| 1989 | Ever Decreasing Circles | Nina | |
| 1991 | Lovejoy | | |
| 1997 | Rag Nymph | | |
| 2002 | The Bill | Mrs. Hacker | |
| 2005 | Life Begins | Maureen Russell | |
| 2008–2009 | EastEnders | Brenda Boyle | 18 episodes |
