= Jan Francis =

English actress (born 1947)

- Born: Janet Stephanie Francis; 5 August 1947 (age 79); Westminster, London, England
- Years active: 1969–present
- Spouse: Martin Thurley (m. 1977)
- Children: 2

Janet Stephanie Francis (born 5 August 1947) is an English actress. She appeared as Lisa Colbert in the late-1970s series Secret Army and as Penny Warrender in the 1980s romantic comedy Just Good Friends.

== Early life ==
Francis was born on 5 August 1947 at Charing Cross Hospital, Westminster, London. She is the eldest child of Frank Francis, a clerical officer with the Royal Agricultural Society of England, and Marjorie (née Watling), an employment agent. She was brought up in Streatham and was educated at the Lady Edridge Grammar School.

After training as a dancer at the Royal Ballet Senior School from which she graduated in 1965, Francis performed with the Royal Ballet Touring Company in Britain, in the rest of Europe and the United States. Francis left the Royal Ballet in September 1969 to pursue an acting career.

== Acting ==
Francis made the transfer to becoming an actress through choreography, and performed with the Cheltenham Repertory Company between 1969 and 1970. She first appeared on television in 1972 in the mini-series Anne of Green Gables playing the part of Diana Barry, before landing BBC Television drama roles including Kschessinska in Fall of Eagles and Lisa Colbert in Secret Army (1977–78). She appeared in Dracula (1979) as Mina Van Helsing with Laurence Olivier as Abraham Van Helsing.

She played the part of Susie Dean in Alan Plater's adaptation of the J. B. Priestley novel The Good Companions (1980) which was produced by Yorkshire Television. Writer John Sullivan met Francis and later created her best-known part, Penny Warrender, in the 1980s BBC sitcom Just Good Friends.

She later co-starred with Dennis Waterman as Sally Hardcastle in the 1989–1992 ITV drama series Stay Lucky. This was followed by an appearance in Heartbeat in 1993, in which she played Vivienne Keen in the episode Love Hurts. She also played Nick's "old enough to be his mother" girlfriend in the sitcom My Family.

During the late 1980s and early 1990s, she appeared in the Lloyds Bank television commercials alongside Nigel Havers and Leo McKern.

In 2006, she guest starred in ITV prison drama Bad Girls as interior designer Catherine Earlham, who was sent to Larkhall on remand for embezzlement. The character played a key role in the exit storyline for fellow inmate Darlene Cake (Antonia Okonma). She is also a regular performer, and part of the original cast, of the touring play Seven Deadly Sins Four Deadly Sinners.

In 2009, she appeared as Julia in the second series of Mistresses on BBC1. In November 2009, she appeared in the ITV drama Collision. She also played a love interest for Rodney Blackstock in the ITV soap opera Emmerdale, in 2010.

In April 2014, she made a guest appearance as a patient in the BBC hospital drama series Casualty.

== Personal life ==
Francis married the actor-writer Martin Thurley in Newton Abbot on 1 August 1977; he writes using the pseudonym Thomas Ellice. They have two daughters and reside in Woodchurch, Kent.

== Selected filmography ==
Year	Title	Role	Notes
1969	The Ken Dodd Show	Various	1 episode
1971	The Fenn Street Gang	Shirley Matthews	Episode: "Who Was That Lady?"
1972	Anne of Green Gables	Diana Barry	4 episodes
1972	BBC Play of the Month	Popham	The Magistrate
1972	The Long Chase	Susan Fraser	13 episodes
1972	Thirty Minute Theatre	Stephanie	Swiss Cottage
1973	Country Matters	Sophie Davenport	Episode: "The Four Beauties"
1973	Doctor in Charge	Diana	Episode: "The Pool"
1973	Hawkeye The Pathfinder	Mabel Dunham (Magnet)	5 episodes
1973	Thriller	Gille Randall	File Under Fear
1974	Fall of Eagles	Kschessinska	Episode: "The Last Tsar"
1974	Play for Today	Lizzie	The Lonely Man's Lover
1974	Rooms	Jan	Jan & Tony (Parts 1 & 2)
1975	Anne of Avonlea	Diana Barry	6 episodes
1975	BBC Play of the Month	Maria	Love's Labour's Lost
1975	Softly Softly: Taskforce	Karen	Episode: "Dorothy's Birthday"
1975	Village Hall	Milly	The Rough and the Smooth
1976	Couples	Emily Rowland	6 episodes
1976	BBC Play of the Month	Grace Harkaway	The London Assurance
1976	Sutherland's Law	Lesley Galbraith	Episode: Blind Jump
1976	The Duchess of Duke Street	Irene Baker	2 episodes
1977	Premiere	Christabel	Give Us a Kiss Christabel
1977	Raffles	Netje	Episode: A Bad Night
1977–78	Secret Army	Lisa 'Yvette' Colbert	17 episodes
1978	Target	Jenny	Episode: "Rogue's Gallery"
1979	Dracula	Mina Van Helsing	Film
1979	ITV Playhouse	Prudence	Casting the Runes
1979	Ripping Yarns	Miranda	Roger of the Raj
1980–81	The Good Companions	Susie Dean	9 episodes
1981	Love Story: A Chance to Sit Down	Barbara Livesey	4 episodes
1982	Tales of the Unexpected	Leila Graham	Death Can Add
1983–86	Just Good Friends	Penny Warrender	22 episodes
1984	Champions	Jo Beswick	Film
1984	Hammer House of Mystery and Suspense	Eva Baler	Corvini Inheritance
1985	Minder	Sarah Bates	Episode: "Life in the Fast Food Lane"
1989–91	Stay Lucky	Sally Hardcastle	16 episodes
1994	Under the Hammer	Maggie Perowne	7 episodes
1995	Jeremy Hardy Gives Good Sex	Various	Video
1995	The Ghostbusters of East Finchley	Grace	6 episodes
1997	Spark	Colette	6 episodes
2000	Sunburn	Rachel Dearbon	1 episode
2001	My Family	Amanda	Episode: "Age of Romance"
2002	Heartbeat	Vivenne Keen	Episode: "Love Hurts"
2002	Micawber	Lady Charlotte	Episode: "Micawber and the Aristocracy"
2005	According to Bex	Sally Atwell	Episode: The Time Warp
2005	Twisted Tales	Penny Marchant	Fruitcake of the Living Dead
2006	Bad Girls	Catherine Earlham	1 episode
2007	Diamond Geezer	Kate	Episode: "Old Gold"
2007	New Tricks	June Parker	Episode: "Power House"
2008	The Invisibles	Janet Rigby	1 episode
2009	Collision	Christine Edwards	4 episodes
2009	Mistresses	Julia	2 episodes
2010	Emmerdale	Sue Hastings	3 episodes
2013	Law and Order UK	Caroline Moran	Episode: "Mortal"
2014	Casualty	Ginny Roxburgh-Berrow	Episode: "Carrot Not Stick"
2016	I Want My Wife Back	Paula	5 episodes
2018	Next of Kin	Elspeth	2 episodes

== Theatre ==
- The Sleeping Beauty (1969) ... Royal Ballet (1969)
- The Farmer's Wife (1969) ... Cheltenham Repertory Company, as Susan Maine
- Sleeping Beauty (1969–1970) ... Pantomime, as Fairy Dreamawhile
- The Boyfriend (1970) ... as Maisie (& Lolita)
- When Did You Last See My Mother (1970) ... at The Theatre Upstairs at the Royal Court, as Linda
- Cinderella (1970) ... at the Manchester Opera House
- Play It Again Sam (1971) ... at the New Theatre, Bromley as one of Barbara and the Dream Girls
- The Heiress (1971) ... as Marian Almond
- Romance! (1971) ... at the Duke of York's Theatre, London as Lotte
- Out of Bounds (1973) ... Bristol Old Vic Company as Ermyntrude Johnson
- Lend Me A Tenor (1986) ... at the Globe Theatre, London as Maggie
- Hay Fever (1988) ... at the Chichester Festival Theatre as Myra Arundel
- 'Dear Ralph' A Valentine's Day Gala (1993) ... at the London Palladium as a Host for the Evening
- Seven Deadly Sins Four Deadly Sinners (2004–2008) ... at various theatres on tour
- An Evening at Le Candide (2006) ... at the King's Head Theatre, London
