= Shelley (TV series) =

British TV sitcom (1979–1992)

- Created by: Peter Tilbury
- Directed by: Anthony Parker
- Starring: Hywel Bennett; Warren Clarke; Garfield Morgan; Belinda Sinclair; Josephine Tewson
- Country of origin: United Kingdom
- Original language: English
- No. of series: 10
- No. of episodes: 71

Production
- Producer: Anthony Parker
- Running time: 25 minutes per episode
- Production company: Thames Television

Original release
- Network: ITV
- Release: 12 July 1979 – 12 January 1984
- Release: 11 October 1988 – 1 September 1992

Shelley is a British sitcom made by Thames Television and originally broadcast on ITV from 12 July 1979 to 12 January 1984 and from 11 October 1988 to 1 September 1992. It stars Hywel Bennett as Dr James Shelley, 28 years old at the outset although 35 by the sixth series only four years later, and a sardonic, perpetually unemployed anti-establishment 'freelance layabout' with a doctoral degree. In the original run, Belinda Sinclair played Shelley's girlfriend Fran, and Josephine Tewson appeared regularly as his landlady, Edna Hawkins. The series was created by Peter Tilbury who also wrote the first three series. The scripts for subsequent episodes were by Andy Hamilton and Guy Jenkin, Colin Bostock-Smith, David Frith, Bernard McKenna and Barry Pilton. All 71 episodes were produced and directed by Anthony Parker.

Series seven was titled on screen The Return of Shelley, and was broadcast in 1988. This time around, Shelley is (still) separated from Fran, and lives on his own, doing his best to avoid obtaining gainful employment. The series begins with Shelley returning to the UK from Kuwait after teaching English for several years, only to find that his calls to his old friends are now screened by answering machines and that yuppieness has taken root in his old neighbourhood. The final three series returned to the on-screen title of Shelley.

In the final series, Shelley is a lodger with Ted Bishop (David Ryall). Ted's house is the only one left in his street, the other residences having been demolished to make way for a leisure centre. Shelley moves in as lodger to help Ted with his fight against the developers who want to demolish the house Ted has lived in his whole life.

== Characters ==
James Shelley
Portrayed by Hywel Bennett
Shelley (or Perce) is the protagonist. He is a terminal layabout who is usually unemployed. He is qualified with a Ph.D. in geography. For a brief time he worked as an advertising executive (only to leave over a point of principle). He was later hired by the Foreign Office, only to be made redundant before his starting date. Shelley is obdurate, argumentative, and awkward; he has a wry, sardonic wit. He espouses left wing socially liberal views, but he is often shown to have reactionary tendencies, and may be something of a hypocrite. Shelley is usually honest about his unemployment and poor work ethic, though occasionally he likes to obscure it by claiming he is 'paid by the government' or is 'in leisure'. He once described his occupation as 'a government artist' because 'I draw the dole'.
Frances Shelley (née Smith)
Portrayed by Belinda Sinclair
Fran is Shelley's longsuffering girlfriend and, later, wife. She is an aspiring writer. Like Shelley, she is educated but unemployed. She is one of the few people who can counter Shelley's more fanciful and obtuse arguments. In the first series she becomes pregnant with Shelley's child; in the second, she publishes a book and marries Shelley; in the third, she gives birth to a daughter, Emma. The beginning of the fifth series reveals that she has left Shelley; she appears in only one episode, and ceases to be a central character.
Edna Hawkins (Mrs H.)
Portrayed by Josephine Tewson
Mrs H. is a somewhat waspish and prim landlady who lets a West Hampstead bedsit to Shelley and Fran in series one and two. She has a son named Colin, and she refers often to Willy, an unseen husband whom she has apparently coerced into working days and nights. She is suspicious of Shelley, and she disapproves of his languid lifestyle. She shows little restraint in verbally attacking him, even though she may be left browbeaten by his eloquence. Her attitude toward Shelley softens over time, however.
Paul England
Portrayed by Warren Clarke
Shelley's closest friend and best man (after being let down by the alcoholic Ned). Paul is a loyal friend to Shelley. Unlike Shelley, he is an industrious man with a successful career. Even so, some of his lifestyle choices betray moral failings (for instance, evidently he solicits prostitutes). Although coarser than Shelley, he doesn't attract the disdain from establishment figures that Shelley does, owing to his charm and self-restraint. He lets his flat to Shelley in series five.
Mrs Radcliffe
Portrayed by Madoline Thomas
An elderly widow who rents a bedsit downstairs from Shelley and Fran. She seems to enjoy a cordial relationship with Shelley, but she believes Fran to be a 'doxy', and landlady Mrs H. to be a murderess who killed her first husband. She appears only in series two and three.
Desmond
Portrayed by Garfield Morgan
A pompous warden in the flats to which Shelley moves in series five. He is envious of the educated Shelley, believing him to be typical of a privileged generation which has grown up in a society where education is attainable by the masses. He has an unrealistic appraisal of his own intelligence, and he fancies himself an amateur poet. He believes that his abilities could have been recognised had he enjoyed the educational privileges of Shelley.
Isobel Shelley
Portrayed by Sylvia Kay
Shelley's mother, who is only 16 years older than her son. Like him, Isobel is outspoken and argumentative. Her political views border on communism, and she lives a fairly nonconformist lifestyle. She smokes cannabis, which she grows for herself throughout her flat (which makes Shelley worry that she'll be discovered and imprisoned). She berates Shelley as an 'evil little capitalist'. Despite her sharp tongue, she has a kinder side: re-mortgages her flat so that Shelley and Fran can buy a house.

=== Minor characters ===
Cyril
Portrayed by John Barron
Shelley's pompous and ineffectual boss at the advertising firm Harper Mackintosh. Cyril is an old-fashioned, self-important. He is detached from the realities of both the company he runs and of contemporary life. (Compare the character CJ, whom Barron previously portrayed in The Fall and Rise of Reginald Perrin.)
Ramond "Ned" Kelly
Portrayed by David Pugh
Ned is Shelley's first choice for best man, even though Fran dislikes him intensely. Ned is an irresponsible alcoholic who is often involved in pub brawls. He is aware that he is slowly drinking himself to death. Although he only appears in one episode, he is mentioned several times thereafter, and is addressed on the telephone.

== List of episodes ==
=== Series 1 (1979–80) ===
The ITV technicians' strike of 1979 delayed transmission of the last three episodes of series one (episodes 5–7). Because of the delay, ITV instead transmitted the three episodes eight months later, immediately before series two.

No. overall	No. in series	Title	Original release date
1	1	"Moving In"	12 July 1979
2	2	"The Nelson Touch"	19 July 1979
3	3	"Gainfully Employed"	26 July 1979
4	4	"The Distaff Side"	2 August 1979
5	5	"Elders and Betters"	17 April 1980 (Note: ITV originally scheduled episode 5 for 16 August 1979.)
6	6	"May the Best Man Win"	24 April 1980 (Note: ITV originally scheduled episode 6 for 23 August 1979.)
7	7	"Nowt So Queer"	1 May 1980 (Note: ITV originally scheduled episode 7 for 30 August 1979.)

=== Series 2 (1980) ===
For the three weeks leading up to the premiere of series two, ITV transmitted the three episodes from series one whose release had been delayed by the technician strike.

No. overall	No. in series	Title	Original release date
8	1	"Owner Occupiers"	8 May 1980
9	2	"Expletive Deleted"	15 May 1980
10	3	"Tea and Sympathy"	22 May 1980
11	4	"Hearth and Home"	29 May 1980
12	5	"Fully Furnished"	5 June 1980
13	6	"Dearly Beloved"	18 June 1980

=== Christmas Special (1980) ===
No. overall	No. in series	Title	Original release date
14	1	"Christmas With Shelley"	22 December 1980

=== Series 3 (1980–81) ===
No. overall	No. in series	Title	Original release date
15	1	"Of Mice and Men"	29 December 1980
16	2	"Signing On"	5 January 1981
17	3	"Nor Iron Bars a Cage"	12 January 1981
18	4	"Foreign Affairs"	19 January 1981
19	5	"Universal Trust"	26 January 1981
20	6	"Dry Rot"	2 February 1981
21	7	"You Have to Laugh"	9 February 1981

=== Series 4 (1982) ===
No. overall	No. in series	Title	Original release date
22	1	"Unkindest Cuts"	18 February 1982
23	2	"A Drop of the Pink Stuff"	25 February 1982
24	3	"No News is Good"	4 March 1982
25	4	"Credit Where Credit’s Due"	11 March 1982
26	5	"Mortal Coils"	18 March 1982
27	6	"Slaughterhouse Sling"	25 March 1982

=== Series 5 (1982) ===
No. overall	No. in series	Title	Original release date
28	1	"On the Road to Damascus"	4 November 1982
29	2	"Brave New World"	11 November 1982
30	3	"Shelley Versus Shelley"	18 November 1982
31	4	"Noises Off"	25 November 1982
32	5	"Tubes Help You Breed Less Easily"	2 December 1982
33	6	"When the Chip Hits the Fan"	9 December 1982

=== Series 6 (1983–84) ===
No. overall	No. in series	Title	Original release date
34	1	"Dry Dreams"	1 December 1983
35	2	"It Nearly Happens to Somebody Else"	8 December 1983
36	3	"Of Cabbages and Kings"	15 December 1983
37	4	"The Party"	22 December 1983
38	5	"Owed to the Electrician"	5 January 1984
39	6	"Brief Encounter"	12 January 1984

=== Series 7 (1988) ===
For this series only, it was titled The Return of Shelley.

No. overall	No. in series	Title	Original release date
40	1	"The Return of Shelley"	11 October 1988
41	2	"In God We Trust"	18 October 1988
42	3	"Emergency Ward 9"	25 October 1988
43	4	"One of Those Nights"	1 November 1988
44	5	"Why Me?"	8 November 1988
45	6	"The Big S"	15 November 1988

=== Series 8 (1989–90) ===
No. overall	No. in series	Title	Original release date
46	1	"The Artful Lodger"	17 October 1989
47	2	"Shelley Washes Whiter"	24 October 1989
48	3	"A Happy Event"	31 October 1989
49	4	"Born Freeish"	7 November 1989
50	5	"Day of the Reptile"	14 November 1989
51	6	"For Whom the Bell Tolls"	21 November 1989
52	7	"The Gospel According to Shelley"	28 November 1989
53	8	"Wages of Virtue"	5 December 1989
54	9	"It’s Only a Game"	12 December 1989
55	10	"Killer Driller"	19 December 1989
56	11	"Cold Turkey"	26 December 1989
57	12	"A Problem Aired"	2 January 1990
58	13	"Help!"	9 January 1990

=== Series 9 (1990) ===
No. overall	No. in series	Title	Original release date
59	1	"A Trial Period"	24 September 1990
60	2	"A Question of Attitude"	1 October 1990
61	3	"Golden Oldies"	8 October 1990
62	4	"The Bug"	15 October 1990
63	5	"Second Best Man"	22 October 1990
64	6	"Brainstrain"	29 October 1990

=== New Year Special (1991) ===
No. overall	No. in series	Title	Original release date
65	1	"Forward to the Past!"	1 January 1991

=== Series 10 (1992) ===
No. overall	No. in series	Title	Original release date
66	1	"The Deep End"	28 July 1992
67	2	"Come Fly With Me"	4 August 1992
68	3	"Love Is…"	11 August 1992
69	4	"A Little Learning"	18 August 1992
70	5	"Happy Birthday - R.I.P."	25 August 1992
71	6	"Accountants & Zulus"	1 September 1992

== Video releases ==
Network Distributing released the first six series on Region 2 DVD-Video between 2007 and 2012. Although a technician strike in 1979 delayed the transmission of three episodes of series one by several months, the Complete Series 1 DVD set contains all seven of the series one episodes, including the three that were delayed. Similarly, the Complete Series 2 set contains only the six episodes that belong to series two—even though ITV transmitted the delayed episodes directly before the series two episodes.

On 20 November 2017, Network released a six-disc set comprising the first six series, and a second DVD set comprising series 7–10.

DVD box sets
Title	Release date
Shelley: The Complete Series 1	19 March 2007
Shelley: The Complete Series 2	16 July 2007
Shelley: The Complete Series 3	5 November 2007
Shelley: The Complete Series 4	22 June 2009
Shelley: The Complete Series 5	13 June 2011
Shelley: The Complete Series 6	30 April 2012
Shelley: The Complete Series 1 to 6	20 November 2017
Shelley: The Complete Series 7 to 10	20 November 2017

== Novelisation ==
New English Library published a novelisation of the first series as a mass-market paperback in 1980. The novel, called Shelley, was adapted by Colin Bostock-Smith.
