= Harold Snoad =

British television producer, writer and director (1935–2024)

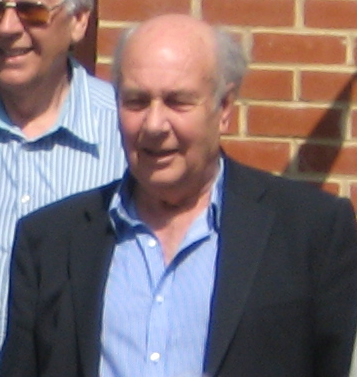
- Snoad in 2011
- Born: Harold Edward Snoad; 28 August 1935; Mill Hill, Middlesex, England
- Died: 2 June 2024 (aged 88)
- Other name: Alan Sherwood
- Occupations: Television director, producer and writer
- Years active: 1957–1995
- Employer: BBC
- Notable work: Dad's Army (1968–1977), Keeping Up Appearances (1990–1995), Don't Wait Up (1983–1990), Ever Decreasing Circles (1984–1988)
- Spouses: Anna Cadwallader (m. 1957, divorced) Jean Green (m. 1963)
- Children: 3

Harold Edward Snoad (28 August 1935 – 2 June 2024) was a British television producer, writer and director. He was best known for the television sitcom Keeping Up Appearances, starring Patricia Routledge and Clive Swift. He was also well known for having directed and produced Ever Decreasing Circles starring Richard Briers and Peter Egan, as well as Don't Wait Up starring Tony Britton and Nigel Havers.

Snoad also had a successful writing career with his writing partner Michael Knowles, writing the Dad's Army radio spinoff, It Sticks Out Half a Mile which evolved into the short-lived television series for ITV called High & Dry.

== Directing and producing career ==
Harold Snoad joined the BBC in 1957, after having worked in the theatre and had numerous roles, including as a "call boy" for an episode of Hancock's Half Hour in 1960. Snoad soon gained promotion, becoming a producer and director in 1969. At the time, he was one of the youngest directors work in television. His first directing role came with Dad's Army starring Arthur Lowe, John Le Mesurier and Clive Dunn. Snoad had already served as production assistant for the first two series and was responsible for choosing the town of Thetford in Norfolk as the site for the location filming. The first episode to be directed by Snoad was The Lion Has Phones, which was first broadcast on 25 September 1969 and attracted 11.3 million viewers. In 1973, Snoad directed the sitcom Casanova '73 starring Leslie Phillips, but the series was not a success and received criticism from Mary Whitehouse. Snoad later went on to say of the series that he felt that if it had been aired five years later then it would "probably have been better received". In 1974, he went on to work on series two of Are You Being Served?. Later that year, Snoad began to work on The Dick Emery Show, the show was already in its twelfth series by then and he would continue to direct and produce the show until its end in 1981. In 1976, Snoad directed with Ray Cooney his first feature film Not Now, Comrade which starred Leslie Phillips, Windsor Davies, Don Estelle and Ian Lavender.

In the 1980s, Snoad worked on all six series of Don't Wait Up, starring Tony Britton, Nigel Havers and Dinah Sheridan, which ran from 1983 to 1990. In 2009, Snoad recalled a joke that the cast played on him while he was having dinner with Patricia Routledge, he said: "Tony Britton - who, by his own admission, did not always arrive at rehearsals dead on time - stopped and knelt down in front of me and asked whether I would be kind enough to allow him another forty-eight hours to complete the five hundred lines I had given him for being late the previous morning! Tony moved on and was replaced by Nigel Havers and Dinah Sheridan who begged forgiveness for chatting during rehearsals. Simon Williams apologised for mucking up one of his lines that morning. One by one the whole cast generally 'bowed and scraped'. As the last member moved on Patricia turned to me and said, 'They obviously adore you!'" Snoad then went on to direct and produce the final two series of Ever Decreasing Circles after the show previous director, Sydney Lotterby, was replaced due to not giving enough direction to the leading actors. The series starred Richard Briers, Penelope Wilton and Peter Egan. The series attracted 12 million views, and Snoad uses the fourth series as a case study for his 1988 book Directing Situation Comedy. While working on the show, Peter Egan observed that Snoad had a very different technique to Lotterby saying that while Lotterby was an introvert, Snoad was an extrovert. In 1988, Snoad directed and produced the television film Wife begins at 40, for this Snoad again worked with Ray Cooney, who he had worked with in Not Now, Comrade. In 1990 he began work on the series that he is perhaps best known, Keeping Up Appearances. The programme ran for five series with 44 episodes, it was ranked 12th in the 2004 poll in Britain's Best Sitcom. By February 2016, the show had been sold almost 1,000 times to overseas broadcasters making it the BBC's most exported television programme.

After 38 years of working with the BBC, Snoad returned to the theatre and in 2009 directed the stage play Say Who You Are. Later that year, he published his second book It's Bouquet - Not Bucket!, in which he tells the behind-the-scenes story of the series. In the book he states that "My intention in writing this book is ... to provide the millions of fans of Keeping Up Appearances with a 'companion' to the series". On the fiftieth anniversary of the first airing of Dad's Army, Snoad gave an interview for the BBC, in which he said "The director of many of the earliest episodes of Dad's Army, which is 50 years old, has said he doubts many of today's shows will last as long." He went on to say that "Nowadays comedies are not so much family viewing." He gave a number of talks on cruise liners, mainly on the Queen Elizabeth 2, on the subject of television comedy.

In 2016, Snoad returned to directing television for the Animated short, Dads Army: A Stripe for Frazer which was a recreation of the original episode A Stripe for Frazer from 1969, of which all recordings have since been wiped. Only the audio tape and the radio episode have survived from the original episode.

== Writing career ==
Snoad began writing with Michael Knowles in 1972 after they were introduced by their mutual friend, Jimmy Perry. When it was decided that there would be a Dad's Army radio series, Perry and Croft were too busy writing series six so it was suggested that Snoad should adapt it with Knowles. In total 67 episodes of Dad's Army were adapted for radio.

In 1981, Snoad and Knowles created the Dad's Army spinoff radio series It Sticks Out Half a Mile. In 1985, they again worked together to create the television adaptation of It Sticks Out Half a Mile with the pilot "Walking the Plank", starring Bernard Cribbins, Richard Wilson and Angus Barnett. The BBC did not commission the series, but in 1987 Yorkshire Television ordered seven episodes under the name of High & Dry. The series was short-lived, with criticism aimed at its lack of location filming which was due to a technicality with union rules. For the series, Snoad uses the pseudonym Alan Sherwood due to his contract to the BBC at the time.

In 2017, nine of the Dad's Army radio scripts were adapted for the stage into a performance called The Dads Army Radio Hour (later The Dads Army Radio Show) by David Benson and Jack Lane for the Edinburgh Festival Fringe. The show toured the UK until March 2020 when it was cut short by the COVID-19 pandemic.

== Personal life and death ==
In 1957 Snoad married Anna Christine Cadwallader, the marriage which later ended in divorce, produced one daughter.

On 6 July 1963, Snoad married Jean Green; the couple had two daughters.

Snoad was a member of the Dad's Army Appreciation Society and in 2013, after the death of Bill Pertwee, he became the society's vice president, with Frank Williams as the President. Snoad frequently attended events with the society as a special guest and speaker.

Snoad died on 2 June 2024, aged 88.

== Awards ==
Throughout his career, Snoad received a number of awards. In 1987 and 1988, he was nominated for a BAFTA for his work on Ever Decreasing Circles. Then in 1989, for Don't Wait Up, he reserved the Television and Radio Industries Club award for "Sitcom of the Year". For his work on Keeping Up Appearances, he reserved two further BAFTA nominations and the prestigious Dutch award, the Silver Tulip.

== Producing/directing credits ==
Year	Title	Notes
1969–1970	Dad's Army	Seven episodes
1969	Oh, Brother!	Three episodes
1972	Idle at Work	One episode
1972	His Lordship Entertains	
1972	Them	Five episodes
1973	Seven of One	Three episodes
1973	Elementary, My Dear Watson	One episode
1973	Home from Home	One episode
1973	Casanova '73	
1974	Are You Being Served?	Five episodes
1974	French Relish	One episode
1974–1981	The Dick Emery Show	52 episodes
1975	The Rough with the Smooth	
1976	Not Now, Comrade	Film
1977	No Appointment Necessary	Two episodes
1978–1980	Rings on Their Fingers	
1981	Partners	Six episodes
1982	Legacy of Murder	
1982	The Further Adventures of Lucky Jim	
1983	Tears Before Bedtime	One episode
1983–1990	Don't Wait Up	
1984	Hilary	Six episodes
1985	The Gender Gap	One episode
1985	Walking the Planks	One episode
1985	Barnet	One episode
1986–1989	Ever Decreasing Circles	14 episodes
1987	Divided We Stand	
1988	Wife Begins at 40	
1988–1989	Brush Strokes	Series 3 (six episodes)
1990–1995	Keeping Up Appearances	
1992	Don't Tell Father	
1994	All Night Long	
2016	Dad's Army	Animated episode: "A Stripe for Frazer"
2023	Dad's Army: The Animations	Animated episode: "A Stripe for Frazer"

== Writing credits ==
Unless otherwise stated, all are co-written with Michael Knowles.

Year	Title	Notes
1970	"Put That Light Out!"	Series 4, Episode 7 of the television series Dad's Army. Episode was based on an idea by Harold Snoad, but written by Jimmy Perry and David Croft
1974–1976	Dad's Army	Radio adaptation of the TV series.
1978	Share and Share Alike	BBC Radio 4 sitcom.
1983–1984	It Sticks Out Half a Mile	Radio sequel series to Dad's Army.
1985	Walking the Planks	Television adaptation of It Sticks Out Half a Mile.
1987	High & Dry	Television adaptation of It Sticks Out Half a Mile, written under the pseudonym Alan Sherwood.
1989	Just His Luck	An untransmitted television pilot, co-written with Ivor Burgoyne.

== Guest appearances ==
Year	Title	Notes
1987	Did You See...?	
2004–2008	Comedy Connections	Episodes: Keeping Up Appearances; Ever Decreasing Circles; Don't Wait Up; Dad's Army
2007	The World's Greatest Comedy Characters	
2008	The Comedy Map of Britain	
2008–2011	The Dad's Army Podcast	6 episodes
2009	Dick Emery: The Comedy of Errors?	
2010	The Story of Are You Being Served?	
2011	Behind the Britcoms: From Script to Screen	
2012	The Unforgettable...	Episode: "The Unforgettable Dick Emery"
2012	Tales of Television Centre	
2014	The Many Faces of...	Episode: "The Many Faces of Dick Emery"
2018	Saluting Dad's Army	3 episodes
2023	Comedy Classics: Keeping Up Appearances	Archive material

== Additional appearances ==
Snoad was interviewed for several television documentaries. In 1987, he appeared in Did You See...? in which he spoke about Ever Decreasing Circles. Then in 2007, he was interviewed for The World's Greatest Comedy Character and then again in 2008 for Comedy Map of Britain. Snoad appeared in four episodes of Comedy Connections in which he spoke about Dad's Army, Don't Wait Up, Ever Decreasing Circles and Keeping Up Appearances. In 2010, Snoad appeared in The Story of 'Are You Being Served'. When the BBC moved from Television Centre, London, Snoad was interviewed for the documentary Tales of Television Centre. On the fiftieth anniversary of Dad's Army, Snoad appeared in four episodes of the UKTV Gold series Salting Dads Army. In 2021, it was announced that Snoad had contributed to a new upcoming book about British sitcoms in the 1970s entitled Raising Laughter: How the Sitcom Kept Britain Smiling in the '70s.

== Views on studio audience ==
Snoad was always a great supporter of the studio audience, saying that "when you watch comedy in a theatre or a cinema you are with other people and laughter is infectious. However, at home there could well just be a couple of you watching or you may even be alone and the genuine reaction of a studio audience (not a laughter track!) can really enhance the viewers' enjoyment."

== Bibliography ==
- Snoad, Harold (1988). Directing Situation Comedy. England: BBC Television Training. ISBN 978-0948694257.
- Snoad, Harold (2009). It's Bouquet – Not Bucket. Brighton, England: Book Guild. ISBN 9781846243516.
