= Michael Knowles (actor) =

English actor (born 1937)

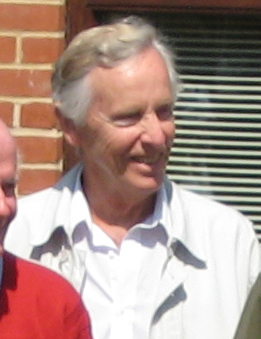
- Knowles at a Dad's Army event in Norfolk, May 2011
- Born: Michael Sydney Knowles; 26 April 1937 (age 89); Spondon, Derby, Derbyshire, England
- Occupations: Actor; scriptwriter
- Notable work: It Ain't Half Hot Mum (1974–1981), Come Back Mrs. Noah (1977–1978), It Sticks Out Half a Mile (1981–1983), You Rang, M'Lord? (1988–1993)
- Spouse: Linda James (m. 1964)
- Children: 2

Michael Sydney Knowles (born 26 April 1937) is an English actor and scriptwriter who is best known for his roles in BBC sitcoms written by Jimmy Perry and David Croft.

He often starred alongside Donald Hewlett with whom he first appeared in It Ain't Half Hot Mum. They later appeared together in Rogue's Rock, Come Back Mrs. Noah and You Rang, M'Lord?

In Knowles' writing career, he co-adapted (with Harold Snoad) the radio version of Dad's Army and writing with Snoad the Dad's Army spinoff series It Sticks Out Half a Mile for radio, which became the television series High and Dry.

== Early life ==
Knowles attended Bemrose Grammar School for Boys, Derby (now The Bemrose School), where he stayed on into the 6th form and played the lead role in the school's production of Shakespeare's Henry V. Knowles considered reading medicine before deciding to become an actor.

== Acting career ==
Knowles started his acting career with the Watford Palace Theatre company which was being managed by Jimmy Perry. It was at Watford where he also met many of his future co-stars including Colin Bean, John Clegg, Donald Hewlett, Jeffrey Holland, Frank Williams, and his future wife Linda James.

Knowles made his earliest appearance in Dad's Army in the 1969 episode "The Loneliness of the Long Distance Walker", one of that series' three missing episodes, but Knowles made four further appearances in the series. Knowles later said of his time with Dad's Army that it "was my introduction to TV. It was quite awe-inspiring working with actors like John Laurie and John Le Mesurier, people I'd only seen in films before, and here I was actually working with them. I was very nervous but enjoyed my time very much." Knowles made his first film appearance in the 1971 feature film of Dad's Army, and the next year appeared in the film That's Your Funeral.

Knowles appeared in the first episode of Are You Being Served? and played the first customer that was served on the series. Knowles later went on to co-write several episodes.

Knowles is best known for his role as Captain Jonathan Ashwood in the sitcom It Ain't Half Hot Mum (1974–81). The series was written by Jimmy Perry and David Croft. When Knowles asked how he ought to play his character, Croft said Captain Ashwood was rather like Knowles himself, a bit 'silly arse'. With Hewlett, he later worked on other series and many pantomimes. It Ain't Half Hot Mum regularly got audiences of up to 17 million.

Shortly after making his first appearance in It Ain't Half Hot Mum, Knowles had a recurring role in The Rough with the Smooth in 1975 playing the Vicar. The series also starred Tim Brooke-Taylor, John Junkin and Richard Hurndall. At the same time as The Rough with the Smooth Knowles appeared as the character of Nigel in the series Rogue's Rock, starring Clive Morton and Knowles' and Donald Hewlett. The next year Knowles went on to have a minor role in the film Spy Story starring Philip Latham.

In 1977, Knowles featured alongside Hewlett again for Jeremy Lloyd and David Croft's second writing collaboration with the science fiction series Come Back Mrs. Noah in which Knowles played the mathematician Fanshaw. Unfortunately, the series ran for only six episodes with some even going as far as to say that it is Britain's worst ever TV sitcom. The series has not been repeated in the UK but has in America where it was slightly more well received by audiences. Knowles continued his double-act alongside Hewlett in the 1984 eight-part BBC Radio sitcom Anything Legal as George, a laid-off city gent. In 1986, Knowles appeared in the film The End Of The World Man playing Sir George.

In 1988, Knowles played The Honourable Teddy Meldrum in Jimmy Perry and David Croft's last collaboration You Rang, M'Lord? which ran until 1993. The series was a success in Eastern Europe and especially in Hungary. In 2018, Knowles along with four other former cast members attending an event in Budapest with 900 Hungarian fans.

In 1989, he voiced the Head of the Air Force in the animated movie The BFG, starring David Jason and based on the novel by Roald Dahl.

Knowles has appeared as Norrington Byng in the children's television series The DJ Kat Show and alongside David Walliams in the comedy sketch show Walliams & Friend, playing the father of Jack Whitehall alongside Whitehall's real life mother Hillary.

In 2021, Knowles appeared on British television for the first time in five years by being interviewed for the Channel 5 documentary Dad's Army: Secret Lives & Scandal. Others interviewees included Frank Williams, Arthur Lowe's son Stephen Lowe and John Le Mesurier's wife Joan Le Mesurier.

== Writing career ==
Knowles is first credited with writing four episodes of Are You Being Served? including Cold Comfort, Big Brother, Shoulder to Shoulder and New Look. Knowles also appeared in two episodes including the pilot and Up Captain Peacock.

Knowles first met Harold Snoad in 1972 when they were introduced by a mutual friend Jimmy Perry, and in 1973 it was decided that Dad's Army would be adapted for radio. At the time David Croft and Jimmy Perry were writing series six and unable to adapt it themselves so it was suggested that Knowles and Snoad would do the first script, the BBC liked it and asked them to do another five. In total the pair adapted 67 episodes for radio which were recorded at London's Paris Theatre. In 2017, David Benson and Jack Lane adapted nine of the radio scripts for the theatre in a show called The Dad's Army Radio Hour (later called Dad's Army Radio Show) which they performed at the Edinburgh Festival Fringe. They went on to tour the country with the show until 2020 when the tour was interrupted by the COVID-19 pandemic.

After the radio adaptation of Dad's Army, Knowles once again teamed up with Snoad to write It Sticks Out Half a Mile, a radio spin-off to Dad's Army. Work started on writing the script in 1980 and when the first one was shown to Arthur Lowe he was so taken with it he unsuccessfully tried to persuade the BBC to make it a television series rather than radio. Recording began in 1981 and picked up the story in 1948 and follows the attempts at trying to save the town's pier. Arthur Lowe died in 1982 and many believed that that was the end of it, however at Lowe's funeral Joan Cooper (Lowe's wife) found Knowles and Snoad, and told them that her husband liked their scripts so much that he would have wanted the full series to go ahead. Recording for the series stated later in 1982 with Ian Lavender and Bill Pertwee.

Together they also adapted It Sticks Out Half a Mile for television, with a pilot called Walking the Planks for the BBC which first aired on 2 August 1985 starred starring Michael Elphick and Richard Wilson. The BBC were not interested in making a series. Undeterred, the two men took the idea to Yorkshire Television who agreed to making a seven part series for ITV, this time with Bernard Cribbins instead of Michael Elphick. The series was well received but filmed on a very low budget and therefore had no location filming, a second series was not commissioned.

== Personal life ==
Knowles married actress Linda James in 1964, having met her while working at the Watford Palace Theatre. James has also worked on many situation comedies, with her most notable role being in The Gnomes of Dulwich which was written by Jimmy Perry, she also appeared in several episodes of Dad's Army and The Liver Birds. They have twin daughters.

In 2022, following the death of Frank Williams, Knowles agreed to take over as president of the Dad's Army Appreciation Society, having been a great supporter of the society since its founding in 1993.

== Selected filmography ==
=== Film ===
Year	Title	Role	Notes
1971	Dad's Army	Captain Cutts	
1972	The Flesh and Blood Show	Curran	
1976	Spy Story	Milkman	
1989	The BFG	Head of the Air Force	

=== Television ===
Year	Title	Role	Notes
1969–72	Dad's Army	Captain Cutts	Occasional character
1970	Up Pompeii!	Caushus	
1971	Sykes and a Big, Big Show		Regular character
1972	His Lordship Entertains	Mr Smith	
1972	Scott On... The Sex War		
1972	That's Your Funeral	Man with Car (Petrol Station)	
1972	Christmas Night with the Stars	Radio producer	
1972	That's Your Funeral	Man with Car	
1972	Casanova '73	Judge	
1972–73	Comedy Playhouse	Rupert/The Customer	
1972–75	Are You Being Served?	The Bold Check/The Customer	
1974–81	It Ain't Half Hot Mum	Captain Jonathan Ashwood	Regular character
1975	The Rough with the Smooth	Vicar	Regular character
1975	Against the Crowd	Rev. Foster	
1975–76	Rogue's Rock	Nigel	Regular character
1975–81	The Dick Emery Show		
1976	Yes, Honestly	Assistant Manager	
1976	Two's Company	Forbes	
1977	Jackanory Playhouse	Duke	
1977	Rings on Their Fingers	Leslie	
1977–78	Come Back Mrs. Noah	Fanshaw	Regular character
1983	Cannon and Ball	Ship Captain	
1986	The End of the World Man	Sir George	
1988	Brush Strokes	Vicar	
1988–93	You Rang, M'Lord?	The Honourable Edward "Teddy" Meldrum	Regular character
1994	KTV	Norrington	
1995	The DJ Kat Show	Norrinton Byng	
2016	Walliams & Friend	Dad	
2021	The Secret Lives of Dad's Army	Self	

=== Radio ===
Year	Title	Role
1974–76	Dad's Army	Various
1983–84	It Sticks Out Half a Mile	Ernest Woolcot
1984–85	Anything Legal	George
1990	Someone and the Grumbleweeds	Guest/Tarzan

== Writing credits ==
Except as stated otherwise, all are co-written with Harold Snoad.

Year	Title	Notes
1974–1976	Dad's Army	Radio adaptation of the TV series.
1974–1975	Are You Being Served?	Four episodes: "Cold Comfort", "Big Brother", "Shoulder to Shoulder", "New Look". Co-written with Jeremy Lloyd and David Croft
1978	Share and Share Alike	BBC Radio 4 sitcom.
1983	Saturday Stayback	Co-writer of two episodes along with various writers (excluding Snoad).
1983–1984	It Sticks Out Half a Mile	Radio sequel series to Dad's Army.
1985	Walking the Planks	Television adaptation of It Sticks Out Half a Mile.
1987	High & Dry	Television adaptation of It Sticks Out Half a Mile.
