= It Sticks Out Half a Mile =

British radio sitcom (1983-84)

- Genre: Sitcom
- Running time: 30 minutes
- Country of origin: United Kingdom
- Language: English
- Home station: BBC Radio 2
- Syndicates: BBC Radio 4 Extra
- TV adaptations: Walking the Planks (1985); High & Dry (1987)
- Starring: John Le Mesurier; Ian Lavender; Bill Pertwee; Vivienne Martin
- Written by: Harold Snoad; Michael Knowles
- Produced by: Martin Fisher
- Recording studio: Paris Studios, London
- Original release: 13 November 1983 – 2 October 1984
- No. of series: 1
- No. of episodes: 13

It Sticks Out Half a Mile is a British radio sitcom that was first broadcast on BBC Radio 2 from 1983 to 1984. Starring John Le Mesurier, Ian Lavender, Bill Pertwee and Vivienne Martin, the series served as a sequel to the television wartime sitcom Dad's Army, for which writers Harold Snoad and Michael Knowles had previously written radio adaptations.

Following the end of Dad's Army, writers Snoad and Knowles wrote a pilot episode starring Arthur Lowe and John Le Mesurier, reprising their roles of Captain Mainwaring and Sergeant Wilson from that series. Recorded in 1981, the episode was left unbroadcast due to Lowe's death in April 1982; it was subsequently broadcast for the first time in 2004 on BBC 7.

In consequence, Snoad and Knowles introduced Lavender and Pertwee, reprising their roles of Private Pike and Warden Hodges, and Vivienne Martin as secretary Miss Perkins, to produce a thirteen-episode series. The series followed the group's attempts to renovate a near-decrepit pier in the seaside town of Frambourne-on-Sea. Ratings were strong enough for a second series to be commissioned. However, Le Mesurier's death in November 1983 resulted in the series's end.

The series spawned two television adaptations. The first, Walking the Planks, was broadcast on BBC1 in 1985. Despite achieving positive viewing figures, the pilot was not commissioned for a full series. In consequence, Snoad and Knowles took their concept to Yorkshire Television, who produced a series titled High & Dry, which ran for seven episodes in 1987.

== Plot ==
It Sticks Out Half a Mile serves as a sequel series to the television wartime sitcom Dad's Army, which followed a platoon of Home Guard soldiers during the Second World War. The sequel series follows the lives of two of the members of the Home Guard platoon, the former Sergeant Arthur Wilson and Private Frank Pike, and their nemesis, the former Chief ARP Warden Hodges, three years after the war in 1948.

Bert Hodges arrives in the seaside town of Frambourne-on-Sea (which is located on the same stretch of coastline as Dad's Army's Walmington-on-Sea, on the South Coast of England) with a plan to restore the town's near-decrepit pier back to its former glory. To achieve this goal, Hodges meets Frank Pike, now twenty-two and working at Woolworths, to convince him to enter a partnership to raise the needed funds. Pike's "uncle" (actually Pike's father), Arthur Wilson, is now the bank manager of the Frambourne branch of Swallow's Bank, so Hodges convinces Pike to ask Wilson for the £5,000 loan needed to purchase the pier. When Wilson refuses to invest such a sum of money in a such a venture, Pike blackmails Wilson over an affair that occurred when Wilson first moved to Frambourne. Wilson reluctantly agrees to give Hodges and Pike the loan, and the pier's renovation begins, but not without its challenges. The trio are met with opposition from Fred Guthrie, the lone chief attendant in charge of supervising the pier, while Wilson must ward off the advances of Miss Perkins, the chief cashier at Swallow's Bank, who is in love with him.

== Cast and characters ==
The cast of It Sticks Out Half a Mile (left to right): Ian Lavender (Pike), John Le Mesurier (Wilson), Vivienne Martin (Miss Perkins), Bill Pertwee (Hodges).

=== Main ===
- John Le Mesurier as Arthur Wilson, a former Sergeant in the Home Guard, who is now the manager of the Frambourne-on-Sea branch of Swallow's Bank. Possessing a calm and relaxed attitude to life, Wilson reluctantly acts as Pike and Hodges's financial advisor upon their purchase of Frambourne Pier.
- Ian Lavender as Frank Pike, a former Home Guard Private who now works in ironmongery at Woolworths. A young, naïve man, and also a dreamer, he enters a partnership with Hodges to renovate Frambourne Pier. Pike's age is incorrect in this series. When Dad's Army began, it was set in 1940, and Pike was stated as being seventeen. However, eight years later in It Sticks Out Half a Mile, set in 1948, Pike is stated as being twenty-two, when he should actually be twenty-five.
- Bill Pertwee as Bert Hodges, a former Chief ARP Warden, who enters a partnership with Pike to renovate Frambourne Pier. An uncouth and brash man, he was previously Pike and Wilson's rival during the war years, however, Hodges decides to work together with Pike and Wilson to renovate the pier. In a 1998 interview with Dave Homewood, the founder of the New Zealand branch of the Dad's Army Appreciation Society, Bill Pertwee admitted that the character of Hodges was "very different" in this series, and agreed that he had become a "bit less rough". Hodges's first name in Dad's Army is William, but in It Sticks Out Half a Mile, his first name has changed to Bert.
- Vivienne Martin as Miss Perkins, the chief cashier at Swallow's Bank. Known for her irritating laugh, she is in love with her manager, Wilson.

=== Recurring ===
- Glynn Edwards as Fred Guthrie, the chief attendant at Frambourne Pier. He complains of various ailments, including a perforated eardrum.
- Michael Knowles as Ernest Woolcot, a talkative know-all with a deep knowledge of piers.
- Hilda Braid as Mrs Briggs, a kindly widower.
- Janet Davies as Mavis Pike, Pike's mother and Wilson's secret lover.

== Episodes ==
All episodes, including "Loyal Support", the original pilot, were recorded at the Paris Studios in London. "Loyal Support" was produced by Jonathan James-Moore, while the regular series was produced by Martin Fisher.

=== Original pilot (1981) ===
| No. overall | No. in series | Title | Recorded | Original release date |
|---|---|---|---|---|
| 1 | 1 | "Loyal Support" | 19 July 1981 | 29 May 2004 |
Arthur Wilson is now manager of the Frambourne-on-Sea branch of Swallow's Bank. He discovers that he has an appointment with George Mainwaring, his former Home Guard Captain. Mainwaring informs Wilson that he wishes to purchase the decrepit Frambourne Pier, with an intention on restoring it. He thus requires an expensive loan from Wilson's bank. Guest starring Josephine Tewson (Miss Baines), Timothy Bateson (Guthrie), Anthony Sharp (Charles Hunter), Duggie Brown (Stephen Rawlings), Sydney Bromley (Percy Short), Haydn Wood (the Man).

=== Series 1 (1983-84) ===
| No. overall | No. in series | Title | Recorded | Original release date |
|---|---|---|---|---|
| 1 | 1 | "The Business Proposition" | 11 September 1982 | 13 November 1983 |
Bert Hodges approaches Frank Pike with a proposal to renovate Frambourne Pier. However, the duo require a loan to fund their venture. Hodges suggests that Pike ask his uncle, bank manager Arthur Wilson, for the loan. Guest starring Edward Burnham (Mr Short), Robin Parkinson (Mr Hunter), Gordon Peters (Mr Rawlings) and Spencer Banks (Council Employee).
| 2 | 2 | "The Bank Loan" | 19 February 1983 | 20 November 1983 |
Pike and Hodges have secured the loan from Wilson's bank. The two men convince Wilson to venture onto the pier in order to inspect their purchase. However, they meet opposition from pier chief attendant Fred Guthrie. Guest starring Glynn Edwards (Guthrie) and Michael Bilton (Mr Johnson).
| 3 | 3 | "Who Owned the Pier?" | 23 February 1983 | 27 November 1983 |
Hodges recruits Wilson to assist him and Pike in conducting research into the history of Frambourne Pier. Meanwhile, Pike organises to reconnect the pier to the electricity board. Guest starring Glynn Edwards (Guthrie), Barrie Gosney (Mr Watkins/the Electrician), James Bryce (the Bank Cashier/the Librarian), and Stuart Sherwin (Electricity Showroom Assistant).
| 4 | 4 | "Inspecting the Piles" | 23 February 1983 | 4 December 1983 |
Hodges and Pike bribe Wilson into helping them inspect the piles of the pier. Having supplied themselves with a radio, a hammer, and a boat, they set off at night on the water.
| 5 | 5 | "Pike in Love" | 19 February 1983 | 11 December 1983 |
Pike has a new girlfriend, but his engagements with her threaten further plans for the pier's renovation. Meanwhile, Hodges discovers that the pier ballroom requires a replacement of deckchairs. Guest starring Carol Hawkins (Avril), Janet Davies (Mrs Pike), and Gordon Salkilld (the Telephone Engineer).
| 6 | 6 | "The Friends of Frambourne Pier" | 26 February 1983 | 18 December 1983 |
Hodges receives the estimates for the pier's renovation. He discovers that the high labour costs involved would prove unreasonable. Miss Perkins suggests that Hodges, Pike and Wilson hire volunteers to help with the renovation. Guest starring Glynn Edwards (Guthrie), Michael Knowles (Ernest Woolcot) and Hilda Braid (Mrs Briggs).
| 7 | 7 | "The First Meeting" | 5 March 1983 | 1 January 1984 |
Due to Wilson's time spent helping Pike and Hodges renovate the pier, Mrs Pike believes that Wilson is having an affair. Meanwhile, the first meeting of the Friends of Frambourne Pier Association (FOFPA) is held. Guest starring Glynn Edwards (Guthrie), Michael Knowles (Ernest Woolcot), Hilda Braid (Mrs Briggs), Michael Bilton (Elderly Man), Madi Hedd (Woman), Jill Lidstone (Young Lady).
| 8 | 8 | "Marooned" | 8 March 1983 | 8 January 1984 |
Pike and Hodges decide to access the pier theatre, the only place they have not been able to access before. Together with Wilson and Miss Perkins, the four of them cross the forty-foot gap by bosun's chair. Guest starring Paul Russell (Derek).
| 9 | 9 | "The Fancy Dress Night" | 5 March 1983 | 15 January 1984 |
In order to attract more interest in the pier and to earn some much-needed funds for repairs, Pike suggests that a fancy-dress party be held at the pier theatre. Guest starring Janet Davies (Mrs Pike), Michael Knowles (Ernest Woolcot), Hilda Braid (Mrs Briggs), Gordon Clyde (Willoughby Smallpiece), Miranda Forbes (Waitress).
| 10 | 10 | "The Builder" | 26 February 1983 | 21 August 1984 |
Pike and Hodges require a builder for the pier. Pike organises to meet the builder, Mr Fisher, later that day, although Hodges is opposed to the idea. Guest starring Glynn Edwards (Guthrie), Stella Tanner (Myrtle Spivy), Gordon Clyde (Mr Fisher), Carol Harrison (the Builder's Receptionist), Katherine Parr (Irish Nun).
| 11 | 11 | "War Damage" | 8 March 1983 | 4 September 1984 |
Miss Perkins suggests that Pike and Hodges apply for war damage compensation from the government to help restore the pier, so Pike and Hodges, along with a reluctant Wilson, travel to Whitehall. Guest starring Reginald Marsh (Sir Wensley Smithers), Michael Bilton (Mr Thorndyke/Civil Servant 3), Gordon Clyde (Civil Servant 1 and 5), Jon Glover (Civil Servant 2 and 4).
| 12 | 12 | "The Pin Up Girl" | 15 March 1983 | 18 September 1984 |
The photos in the pier's What the Butler Saw machines need updating. Pike and Hodges task Wilson in persuading Miss Perkins to pose as the model. Meanwhile, Hodges attempts to join the local rotary club in order to gain contacts to help restore the pier. Guest starring Robin Parkinson (Mr Hunter), Christopher Biggins (Dudley Watkins).
| 13 | 13 | "Hidden Treasure" | 15 March 1983 | 2 October 1984 |
While mending the pier turnstiles, Pike, Hodges and Guthrie discover a booklet revealing the general location of a jewel-studded golden seahorse brooch, hidden somewhere on the pier. Pike suggests they seek guidance from Madame Zara, a fortune teller. Guest starring Glynn Edwards (Guthrie), Betty Marsden (Madame Zara).

== Production ==
=== Development ===
When Dad's Army ended after nine series in 1977, there were discussions about either continuing the series on the ITV network or for a sequel series to be produced which would follow the Walmington-on-Sea platoon as members of the town council in post-war Walmington. However, Harold Snoad and Michael Knowles instead submitted the idea for It Sticks Out Half a Mile to the BBC's radio department. Initially, the writers had intended the series to be produced for television, but the BBC suggested that a radio series would be more appropriate. The idea was well-received, and a pilot episode was commissioned.

The pilot episode, titled "Loyal Support", starred Arthur Lowe and John Le Mesurier, reprising their roles of Captain Mainwaring and Sergeant Wilson respectively. The episode followed Mainwaring, who, returning from Switzerland with his wife, arrives in Frambourne-on-Sea and approaches Swallow's Bank for a loan to purchase the town's decrepit pier. He is shocked to discover that the bank manager is his former Home Guard Sergeant Arthur Wilson. Wilson, reluctantly, agrees to give Mainwaring his loan, and together they meet the local town council to purchase Frambourne Pier.

During the Second World War, seaside piers had sections removed from them in order to prevent German forces from using them to access the mainland. Shortly after the war, piers across the United Kingdom were dilapidated and poorly maintained; the series depicts this era in Britain's post-war history.

Lowe had struggled to record the pilot, owing to his narcolepsy, which caused him to slur his words and fall asleep part way through recording; however, he and Le Mesurier enjoyed working with each other on the pilot and agreed to return to their roles once further episodes had been written. If the ratings were strong, the possibilities of adapting the series for television were discussed. Snoad and Knowles were writing the rest of the scripts for a full series when, on 15 April 1982, Arthur Lowe died. The series was shelved, the existing pilot episode was left unbroadcast, and the tape was wiped, but co-writer Snoad retained a copy which he later returned to the BBC. A short excerpt of this pilot was played on a documentary entitled The Archive Hour: Radio's Lost Property on 1 November 2003, with the complete programme being heard on a BBC 7 compilation entitled Some of Our Archives Were Missing on 29 May 2004.

It was believed that the aborted series had ended; however, Lowe's wife, actress Joan Cooper, assured Snoad and Knowles that the series should continue, since her husband had believed that it "had so much potential". Snoad and Knowles thus convinced the BBC that the idea could still be viable, so a second pilot, titled "The Business Proposition", was recorded on 11 September 1982, with Ian Lavender, Bill Pertwee and Vivienne Martin joining the cast. This being a success, twelve more episodes were commissioned as part of a thirteen-part series.

=== Writing ===
As part of their contracts with the BBC, Snoad and Knowles were obligated to write fifteen scripts for the series, even though two episodes were ultimately never recorded. The writing process began when Snoad and Knowles met to discuss the storylines for each episode. They would then separate, write an episode each, and meet again to discuss the episodes they had written. In consequence, the only episodes written by the two writers together were the original pilot, "Loyal Support", and the second pilot, "The Business Proposition". According to Michael Knowles, he was more adept at writing dialogue and Snoad was better at writing plots and storylines.

=== Aftermath ===
In a 1998 interview, Bill Pertwee, when prompted, believed that, had John Le Mesurier not died, the BBC "probably would have done another series". This was supported by Lavender, who, in 1999, revealed that there were again discussions about adapting the series for television after the first series had aired. However, it was not until 2014 that news of a second series having been commissioned was confirmed. Producer Martin Fisher, speaking in a separate interview recorded before 2014, recalled that the first series "went out and [was] quite popular" with the public. Fisher was editing the final episode when he received the news that Le Mesurier had died, which "spelt the end of a second series, which had already been commissioned".

The series was notable in that it featured some of Le Mesurier's final performances, being the final radio series he recorded before his death on 15 November 1983, two days after the first episode, "The Business Proposition", was broadcast. Pertwee later recalled, in May 2000, that the series "was like one last get-together, one last party with great friends".

== Release ==
=== Broadcast and archival status ===
The first nine episodes of the series were broadcast from 13 November 1983 to 15 January 1984 on Sunday afternoons at 1:30 pm. Each episode was repeated the following Friday at 10:00 pm, from 18 November 1983 to 20 January 1984. Later in the year, following a repeat airing of the first five episodes beginning 17 July 1984, the final four episodes of the series were broadcast from 21 August to 9 October 1984 at 10:30 pm.

Following its original airing and a repeat airing, the series was repeated for a second time on BBC Radio 2, but a mix-up between different departments of the BBC resulted in most of the broadcast tapes being wiped. Since the series was believed to be of no interest to an overseas audience, none of the episodes were preserved by the BBC Transcription Services. Off-air recordings of the series were unearthed during the BBC's Treasure Hunt campaign, which were later broadcast by the digital radio archive channel BBC 7. Up until 2000, the only episodes held in the BBC archives were "The Business Proposition", "The Bank Loan" and "Pike in Love", in addition to the original pilot, "Loyal Support", which had been returned by co-writer Harold Snoad prior to the BBC Treasure Hunt campaign.

=== Media releases ===
The original pilot and the first three episodes of the series were released in September 2010, on a compact disc titled Classic BBC Radio Comedy: It Sticks Out Half a Mile. A second CD, containing the next four episodes and titled It Sticks Out Half a Mile: Continued, was released in February 2012. Both were also released as audiobooks. The whole series, including the original pilot, was subsequently released as a CD and audiobook in October 2019.

The original pilot was released on the Dad's Army: The Complete Radio Series: Series 3 compact disc in May 2015. The pilot was also released on the collector's edition of series three, released in March 2004.

== Reception ==
Reception for the series was mixed, with reviewers praising the performances of the central actors yet criticising the show's humour and its overall quality compared to Dad's Army. According to Pertwee, large groups of people, many of whom were Dad's Army fans, lined up to attend the recording for the first episode of the series on 11 September 1982, a rare occurrence for radio programmes at that time. Andrew Grimes, writing in the Manchester Evening News after the first episode had aired, described the series as an "unexpected sequel". He praised Le Mesurier's performance, but noted that his comedic mannerisms, perfectly suited for television, were lost due to the series being on radio. Grimes wrote that Le Mesurier was "getting laughs that the dialogue did not by itself deserve", but observed that he was "mugging for the benefit of the studio audience" rather than for the general listening public.

Conversely, The Daily Telegraph's Gillian Reynolds believed that the series "tarnishe[d] the memory" of Dad's Army. Although praising the "worthy performances" of the lead characters, she criticised the "sad smut of the script" and wrote that the series "comes nowhere near to awakening that mixture of rueful nostalgia and ironic affection that Dad's Army did so well".

In 2012, Graham McCann, in his biography on John Le Mesurier, wrote that, while the first episode was enjoyable, further episodes in the series would "fall rather flat". However, he went on to acknowledge that "the unforced rapport between Le Mesurier, Lavender and Pertwee kept the series sufficiently entertaining to justify it as a spin-off". In a 2021 article, Rhianna Evans from the British Comedy Guide wrote positively of the series, commenting that the central characters of Hodges, Pike and Wilson "all remain very recognisable" from their roles established in Dad's Army. She noted that the series possessed a "character-driven, gentle-paced form of storytelling", and expressed admiration for the new characters introduced in the series, such as Miss Perkins and Guthrie, noting that "the new cast don't alter the style or tone of It Sticks Out Half A Mile from that laid down in Dad's Army at all". She concluded by writing that the series is "a continuation of the Dad's Army story that any fan would enjoy".

== Television adaptations ==
There were two attempts to adapt It Sticks Out Half a Mile for television, without the Dad's Army characters. The first attempt was a pilot episode for BBC1, titled Walking the Planks. Filmed on location at a real pier, it starred Michael Elphick as Ron Archer (Hodges's equivalent), Richard Wilson as Richard Talbot (Wilson's equivalent), Gary Raynsford as Trevor Archer (Pike's equivalent) and Vivienne Martin as Talbot's secretary, now called Miss Baxter. Despite being watched by eleven million viewers, the BBC did not commission a series.

In consequence, Knowles and Snoad took the concept to Yorkshire Television, who produced a seven-episode series titled High & Dry. In the role previously performed by Elphick, Bernard Cribbins was cast, and Angus Barnett took over the role of Trevor Archer. Snoad and Knowles were unhappy with this series, since, unlike the pilot for the BBC, High & Dry was filmed solely in the studio; they believed this was the reason the series lasted for only seven episodes.

== See also ==
- Dad's Army
- Dad's Army radio series
- Share and Share Alike
- High & Dry
