= High & Dry (1987 TV series) =

- Genre: Comedy
- Created by: Harold Snoad (as Alan Sherwood); Michael Knowles
- Starring: Bernard Cribbins; Richard Wilson; Angus Barnett; Vivienne Martin
- Country of origin: United Kingdom
- Original language: English
- No. of series: 1
- No. of episodes: 7 (+ 1 BBC pilot)

Production
- Producer: Ronnie Baxter
- Running time: 25 minutes
- Production company: Yorkshire Television

Original release
- Network: ITV
- Release: 7 January – 18 February 1987

High & Dry is a 1987 British television sitcom written by Harold Snoad (using the pseudonym Alan Sherwood, as he was then contracted to the BBC) and Michael Knowles. The series, produced by Ronnie Baxter for Yorkshire Television, starred Bernard Cribbins, Richard Wilson, Angus Barnett and Vivienne Martin. It was a television adaptation of the BBC radio series It Sticks Out Half a Mile, a sequel to Dad's Army.

Following a pilot episode for BBC Television broadcast in 1985 under the title Walking the Planks, the writers took the concept to the ITV company. Only one series was made.

== Walking the Planks ==
A television pilot was broadcast on BBC1 on 2 August 1985. It starred Michael Elphick as Ron Archer, Richard Wilson as Richard Talbot, Gary Raynsford as Trevor Archer and Vivienne Martin as Miss Baxter. It was an attempt to adapt the radio series It Sticks Out Half a Mile for television, but the BBC did not commission a series. Writers Snoad and Knowles took their idea to Yorkshire Television, who decided High & Dry was a suitable project for a series.

Title	Written by	Directed by	First broadcast	Broadcast details
Walking the Planks	Harold Snoad and Michael Knowles	Harold Snoad	2 August 1985	BBC1, 8.30pm

Ron Archer only allowed himself the merest flirtation with the three Rs. However, over the years, he has carefully developed a fourth R – Resourcefulness. This comes to the fore when he decides to buy an old seaside pier. All he needs is the money!

== Cast ==
=== Main characters ===
- Bernard Cribbins - Ron Archer
- Richard Wilson - Richard Talbot
- Angus Barnett - Trevor Archer
- Vivienne Martin - Miss Baxter

=== Secondary characters ===
- Arthur English - Fred Whattle
- David Simeon - Ernest Woolcott
- Diana Coupland - Mrs Olive Briggs
- Poppy Lane - Laura Talbot (unseen character)

== Plot ==
Ron Archer and his son Trevor decide to buy an old decrepit pier, with Midbourne Council having put it up for sale for just five shillings. After visiting his brother-in-law Richard Talbot, manager of the local bank, Ron asks for a £2000 loan for maintenance costs, which he must guarantee to pay once he buys the pier. Richard is aghast at the prospect of giving someone a £2000 loan, especially a man like Ron. However, Ron has expected this to happen, so he blackmails Richard into giving him the loan. With financial costs all sorted, Ron and Trevor, with an uneasy Richard acting as financial advisor, meet with Midbourne Council to discuss the pier. When Richard starts having second thoughts again, Ron blackmails him further, and forms a solution for paying off the loan. With that all sorted, the council and the new owners of Midbourne Pier raise their glasses in celebration. Midbourne Pier is theirs.

== Episodes ==
This series chronicalises the first eight episodes of It Sticks Out Half a Mile.

#	Episode Title	Written by	Directed by	First broadcast
1	"The Pier"	Alan Sherwood (Harold Snoad) and Michael Knowles	Ronnie Baxter	7 January 1987
2	"Dry Rot"	Alan Sherwood and Michael Knowles	Ronnie Baxter	14 January 1987
3	"The Plans"	Alan Sherwood and Michael Knowles	Ronnie Baxter	21 January 1987
4	"Trevor's Brainwave"	Alan Sherwood and Michael Knowles	Ronnie Baxter	28 January 1987
5	"The Battle of Britain Reborn"	Alan Sherwood and Michael Knowles	Ronnie Baxter	4 February 1987
6	"Local Enthusiasm"	Alan Sherwood and Michael Knowles	Ronnie Baxter	11 February 1987
7	"The Hole"	Alan Sherwood and Michael Knowles	Ronnie Baxter	18 February 1987

== Setting ==
The series was set in 1946, just after the Second World War, in the fictional town of Midbourne. Most of the action took place at the decrepit pier owned by Ron and Trevor, or the bank where Richard and Miss Baxter worked.

=== Midbourne Pier ===
Midbourne Pier was built in 1860 by real-life pier designer Eugenius Birch. In 1917, the pier was bought by Rolf Andrews and his partner Thomas Adler. They owned the pier for four months, before selling it, as they couldn't get it back on its feet. The pier was closed in 1932. After that, the council bought it, later selling it to Ron and Trevor Archer for five shillings in 1946. Between 16 and 21 March 1940, the middle of the pier was demolished so that the enemy could not land aboard and sneak onto the shore.

Ron and Trevor's telephone number for the pier is Midbourne 293. Visiting figures for the pier revealed that just 86 people visited the pier in September 1931.

Attractions at the pier included the clairvoyant Madame Zara, Gladys Wilcox and Her Trio and a theatre at the end of the pier, where Wee Georgie Wood and Myra Hess used to perform.

Amusements included: a test-your-strength machine, a punchball, distorted mirrors, a cockle and whelks stall, a rock shop, a crooked house, a ballroom, a haunted graveyard, a What the Butler Saw machine, a horoscope machine and a gift crane, among others.

=== The Friends of Midbourne Pier Association (FOMPA) ===
The Friends of Midbourne Pier Association, often shortened to FOMPA, is a voluntary service that was created to help restore the decrepit Midbourne Pier. It was formed when Ron Archer and his son Trevor were having financial difficulties, and discovered it would cost a hefty price to restore the pier. It was originally Trevor's idea to have volunteers help with the restoration, when he read in an article about a parents association that rebuilt a school. Trevor thought of the name SPAM, the Society for Preserving Ancient Monuments, but they both settled on FOMPA, the Friends of Midbourne Pier Association. Its members include:

- Ron and Trevor Archer, chairmen
- Richard Talbot, enrolment official
- and volunteers Miss Baxter, Ernest Woolcott, Olive Briggs, Arthur Ramsden, and various citizens of Midbourne

=== Midbourne Council ===
The council of Midbourne appear in the first episode of the series. It is made up of the town clerk Henry Cummings, entertainments manager Derek Rawlings, head of publicity Graham Winters and Borough Treasurer Frank Short, along with several council employees. Former clairvoyant Madame Zara who used to work at the pier now works for the council in forward planning. After placing an advertisement in the Midbourne Gazette, the council sell Midbourne Pier for just five shillings and are pleased to let it go. As a council, they appear to work well together, and are well acquainted with respectable bank manager Richard Talbot.

== Characters ==
=== Main characters ===
==== Ron Archer (played by Bernard Cribbins) ====
Ron Archer
- Walking the Planks and High & Dry character
- First appearance: "The Pier"; High & Dry; 7 January 1987
- Last appearance: "The Hole"; 18 February 1987
- Created by: Harold Snoad and Michael Knowles
- Based on: ARP Warden Hodges
- Portrayed by: Michael Elphick (Walking the Planks); Bernard Cribbins (High & Dry)

In-universe information
- Occupation: Unemployed
- Family: Ex wife Trevor Archer (son); Laura Talbot (sister)
- Relatives: Richard Talbot (brother-in-law)
- Nationality: British

Ron Archer is a crafty lower class unemployed man who is the owner of Midbourne Pier, along with his son Trevor. He is about 45, born around 1901, and has a not-too-bright son aged 19. Ron's wife left him for a publican eighteen years ago, in 1928, but he is still optimistic that she will return. Ron was left unemployed when the firm he was working for (creating garden gnomes) closed down during the war. His son's school was bombed and when at home and the air raids began, Ron would take Trevor down the garden into the air raid shelter. In "The Battle of Britain Reborn", he is hinted to suffer from migraines. He sometimes mispronounces words and confuses maths sums, but is not unintelligent. He is, however, a shady and "common" character.

Ron is disgusted at what is happening with Midbourne Pier, and feels it is his duty to restore 'this prime example of British heritage'. He and his son Trevor buy the pier for just five shillings, but must pay £2000 in maintenance costs. Ron visits his brother-in-law Richard, who also happens to be a bank manager, to ask for a loan. (It is revealed in "Dry Rot" that had Ron's bank managing friend not been in jail, he would have acquired the loan from him.) When Richard is reluctant, Ron blackmails Richard into giving him the loan.

His sister Laura, who is described as being heavily built, moved to Midbourne in 1945, just after the war. She is married to Richard Talbot, Ron's brother-in-law. Ron and Richard have not seen each other for at least five years (sometime before the war), and are not very close friends. Ron, much to the disgust of Richard, likes to call his brother-in-law "Dickie".

His son's dimwittedness causes Ron some anxiety and annoyance. Generally, however, Ron and Trevor share a good relationship together.

Ron has fond memories of the pier and is very enthusiastic to repair it. He also knows quite a lot about its history. Before the war, clairvoyant Madame Zara, who Ron wishes to hire at Midbourne, read Ron's palm. She said that he would always be greatly respected for his business decisions, but after that her ball went hazy. Ron is rather rattled when a card from the pier's horoscope machine reads about his star sign: 'Naturally aggressive. You should hold this in check. You would like to be accepted in the world of big business, but your inability to grasp even basic facts precludes you. Consider whether you have a chip on your shoulder, otherwise true success will always elude you.' Ron lives nine miles from the pier and owns a rusty and poorly running small dark grey vehicle. Its door has a tendency to fall off its hinges.

Ron Archer is based on ARP Warden Hodges (portrayed by Bill Pertwee), regular cast member in Dad's Army and It Sticks Out Half a Mile. Ron was portrayed by Michael Elphick in Walking the Planks.

He appears in all episodes.

==== Richard Talbot (played by Richard Wilson) ====
Richard Talbot
- Walking the Planks and High & Dry character
- First appearance: Walking the Planks; 2 August 1985
- Last appearance: "The Hole"; High & Dry; 18 February 1987
- Created by: Harold Snoad and Michael Knowles
- Based on: Sergeant Arthur Wilson
- Portrayed by: Richard Wilson

In-universe information
- Nickname: Dickie
- Occupation: Bank manager
- Family: Laura Talbot (wife); Children
- Children: Yes; two or more
- Relatives: Ron Archer (brother-in-law); Trevor Archer (nephew-in-law)
- Nationality: British

Richard Talbot, often nicknamed "Dickie" by his brother-in-law Ron, much to Richard's annoyance, is the manager of the Midbourne branch of the National United Bank. He is rather unhappily married to Laura Talbot. The couple have children as revealed in "The Pier". Richard is a respectable citizen in Midbourne; he knows all the members of Midbourne Council and is recognised by nearly everyone in the community. He arrived in Midbourne in 1945 to manage the National United Bank in town. He is often cynical and makes dry witted jokes and observations, mostly towards Ron's attempts to restore Midbourne Pier. During the war, Richard fought in the desert with General Montgomery at the Second Battle of El Alamein.

It is revealed in the opening episode that Richard supposedly had an affair with one Gloria Smith, a lonely widow, just after being offered the job at the bank. He needed a place to stay in Midbourne and answered Gloria's advert in the paper. Ron Archer, Richard's brother-in-law, uses this information to bribe Richard into giving Ron a loan. Richard claims, 'There was nothing in it.' It is uncertain whether anything did happen, but Ron still convinces Richard to give him the loan by informing that his wife wouldn't be pleased if she knew he had shared a house with a widow. Ron also learned that Gloria knew about an incident where several traveller's cheques went missing, and Richard was responsible. This is confirmed when Richard asks Ron worriedly, 'How do you know about that?' From there forth, Richard must act as Ron and his son Trevor's financial advisor.

Richard is cynical towards Ron and Trevor's attempts to restore the pier, and is shocked at the amount of money his bank must lend them to restore it. He finds Ron a common man, which he is, and discourages Miss Baxter to become involved with the pier. Richard does, however, have fond memories of the pier when he visited it as a young man.

Miss Baxter, Richard's secretary at the bank, is completely in love with him. At times, Richard knows this and tends to keep a safe distance away from her, and at other times he is oblivious to her harmless advances. He wants to stay loyal to his wife. He does, however, like Miss Baxter as a friend and sees her as a very efficient worker. When Ron visited Richard in his office, he commented that Richard had a 'fatal fascination over women', referring to Miss Baxter. Richard seemed quite pleased. Miss Baxter tells Richard that his signature is 'most impressive', but concludes that 'somehow it doesn't matter that you can't read it'. Richard is mildly offended by this.

Richard turns out to be very strong: in "Dry Rot" when Ron, Richard and Trevor are seeing what needs mending at the pier, Ron finds a test your strength machine. Ron claims he used to be good at it, so he tries it out. The readout reads three pounds. When Richard has a go, the readout reads 54 pounds. Ron sheepishly claims that the machine is obviously faulty. Later on in "Local Enthusiasm", he is heard to have hit the pier's punchball off its rusted chain into the sea.

Richard usually wears a grey two-piece suit with a red tie, and when outside a grey flat cap. He owns a red MGTC that is often serviced at Middleton Motors.

Richard Talbot is based on Sergeant Arthur Wilson (portrayed by John le Mesurier), regular cast member in Dad's Army and It Sticks Out Half a Mile. Richard was also portrayed by Richard Wilson in Walking the Planks.

He appears in all episodes.

==== Trevor Archer (played by Angus Barnett) ====
Trevor Archer
- Walking the Planks and High & Dry character
- First appearance: Walking the Planks; 2 August 1985
- Last appearance: "The Hole"; High & Dry; 18 February 1987
- Created by: Harold Snoad and Michael Knowles
- Based on: Private Frank Pike
- Portrayed by: Gary Raynsford (Walking the Planks); Angus Barnett (High & Dry)

In-universe information
- Occupation: Trainee Deputy Assistant Undermanager in Ironmongery at Woolworths
- Family: Ron Archer (father); Mother (whereabouts unknown)
- Relatives: Richard Talbot (uncle); Laura Talbot (auntie)
- Nationality: British

Trevor Archer is a gormless young man who owns Midbourne Pier with his father Ron. He was born in 1927 and is 19-years-old. His mother ran out on Ron and Trevor for a publican the following year. In 1940, the air raids began; Trevor's school was bombed and when at home, Ron would take the young Trevor down to the air raid shelter. 'What with one thing and another,' his father explains to Richard, 'Trevor led a very sheltered life.' Ron is worried that Trevor may think the real reason his mother left was because of Ron. Trevor is aware that Richard and Ron are not close friends; they haven't seen each other since before the war. At first, Trevor is shocked and discouraged that Ron has bought Midbourne Pier, especially after learning they must pay £2000 for maintenance, but quickly grasps the opportunity to restore it back to its former glory.

Trevor is a gormless man who sometimes has flights of ingenuity. On more than one occasion, he is seen to hatch plans and create schemes to help out with the restoration of Midbourne Pier, saving money in the process. He had the idea to start a voluntary service to mend the pier, called FOMPA.

Trevor works at the local Woolworths as a Trainee Deputy Assistant Undermanager in Ironmongery. He suffers from carsickness, and doesn't like apples. In "Trevor's Brainwave", Trevor finds a girlfriend, a 20-year-old blonde called.

Trevor Archer is based on Private Frank Pike (portrayed by Ian Lavender), regular cast member in Dad's Army and It Sticks Out Half a Mile. Trevor was portrayed by Gary Raynsford in Walking the Planks.

He appears in all episodes.

==== Miss Baxter (played by Vivienne Martin) ====
Miss Baxter
- Walking the Planks and High & Dry character
- First appearance: Walking the Planks; 2 August 1985
- Last appearance: "The Hole"; High & Dry; 18 February 1987
- Created by: Harold Snoad and Michael Knowles
- Based on: Miss Perkins, It Sticks Out Half a Mile
- Portrayed by: Vivienne Martin

In-universe information
- Occupation: Secretary
- Family: Auntie
- Nationality: British

Miss Baxter is Richard's secretary at the Midbourne branch of the National United Bank. She is completely in love with the manager of the bank, Richard; in the first episode, she remembers the exact date he started working there. 'It's been absolutely marvellous since you took over from Mr Russell. I really enjoy coming to work now,' she says fondly. Miss Baxter is a very considerate person and worries about Richard's health and wellbeing, such as when he wanted to open a window for fresh air, she asked him worriedly, 'You're not going to do anything silly, are you?'. She has an annoying, longwinded laugh; laughing mostly at Richard's half-hearted jokes. She admires Richard's great way with words.

In the first episode, she informs Richard that Ron Archer has made an appointment to see him. She is fairly suspicious of Ron at first, when he keeps having private meetings with Richard, but grows to like Ron and the fact that he is taking his time to restore Midbourne Pier. However, in "The Battle of Britain Reborn", after Ron makes a joke about Richard's managing skills, she angrily defends Richard, and apologises for speaking "out of turn". She displays much interest in FOMPA and is the first to volunteer to help out with the pier; she also looks forward to working with Ron, Trevor and especially Richard on the project. In "Local Enthusiasm", she is seen handing out the pamphlets for FOMPA, and makes sure to sit next to Richard during the meeting. At the meeting, she checks the haunted graveyard, and tells a vivid and frightening story of what she saw. When an eager crowd ask what happened next, she tells them that, 'I closed my eyes, I can't stand anything like that.' Miss Baxter provides her homemade gingerbread men and elderberry wine at the meeting, which Trevor gets drunk on. She is distraught when, over some complicated events beforehand, she overhears that Richard may be having an affair with another woman and storms off. In the final episode, she ventures with Ron, Trevor and Richard to the other side of the pier, taking notes in shorthand.

Miss Baxter hasn't met Richard's wife Laura. She lives with her auntie and has never had much luck with men. She is fond of Thumper the rabbit in Bambi, and has seen the movie six times and cried each time. She is also very fond of the theatre. Miss Baxter's first name is never given.

Miss Baxter also appears in Walking the Planks and as Miss Perkins in It Sticks Out Half a Mile, all played by Vivienne Martin.

She appears in all episodes.

=== Secondary characters ===
==== Fred Whattle (played by Arthur English) ====
Fred Whattle
- High & Dry character
- First appearance: "Dry Rot"; High & Dry; 14 January 1987
- Last appearance: "Local Enthusiasm"; 11 February 1987
- Created by: Harold Snoad and Michael Knowles
- Based on: Fred Guthrie, It Sticks Out Half a Mile
- Portrayed by: Arthur English

In-universe information
- Occupation: Chief attendant at Midbourne Pier
- Family: Wife
- Nationality: British

Fred Whattle is a lower class, "common" individual who works as the chief attendant at Midbourne Pier. His duties include having to lock up at the end of his shift, keeping unwanted visitors out, and maintaining the pier and its buildings. There were once five chief attendants at Midbourne Pier, but two left when the pier closed in 1932, and another two left during the war, leaving Fred as the only one still working there in 1946. He is not in the best of health, as he describes himself as having a perforated eardrum, a funny wrist and a faulty heart, among others. He supposedly suffers from shooting pains, even though he never went to war. In "The Battle of Britain Reborn" he is revealed to keep whippets. Also in "The Battle of Britain Reborn", he is hinted to have a wife, and in the following episode ("Local Enthusiasm") he himself confirms he is married. It takes him an hour to walk to and from his house from the pier, so he lives quite a distance from it. He occasionally clashes with Ron, usually over work matters, but maintains a generally good relationship with Ron, Trevor and Richard. He declines to join FOMPA, which would mean him having to work overtime, unpaid.

Fred Whattle is based on Fred Guthrie (portrayed by Glynn Edwards) in It Sticks Out Half a Mile.

He appears in "Dry Rot", "The Battle of Britain Reborn" and "Local Enthusiasm".

==== Ernest Woolcott (played by David Simeon) ====
Ernest Woolcott is an annoying, pigheaded, upper-class Midbourne citizen who is an expert on piers. He has a great knowledge about piers, and the history of Midbourne Pier, including how Eugenious Birch built it in 1860, and even the date when the middle part of the pier was demolished during the war. After Miss Baxter, he is the first to show an interest in volunteering for FOMPA. He doesn't have much of a sense of humour. He likes to be very prompt, saying: 'That promptness is the first cousin to efficiency.' He also suspects that Richard and Miss Baxter are having an affair. Ernest likes voicing his opinion during the meetings of FOMPA, and although Ron respects Ernest's knowledge in piers, he doesn't like him very much. Trevor calls him a bit of a bore. At the meeting, Ernest checks the What the Butler Saw machines, which unsurprisingly don't work. He forms a small friendship with Miss Olive Briggs, as he is often seen chatting to her.

Ernest Woolcott is played by Michael Knowles in It Sticks Out Half a Mile.

He appears in "The Battle of Britain Reborn" and "Local Enthusiasm".

==== Mrs Olive Briggs (played by Diana Coupland) ====
Mrs Olive Briggs is a flashy middle-aged widow who lives in Midbourne. After Miss Baxter, she is the second person (following Ernest Woolcott) to show an interest in volunteering for FOMPA. She has fond memories of Midbourne Pier, such as strolling along the pier with a glass of sarsaparilla, or eating tea and cake. She is quite friendly to everyone she meets, and enjoys a bit of gossip. She voices her opinions during the meetings of FOMPA, which mildly annoy and bore Ron and Trevor. At the meeting, Mrs Briggs checks the test-your-strength machine and the punchball, which are not in good shape. She forms a small friendship with Ernest Woolcott, as she is often seen chatting to him.

Mrs Olive Briggs is played by Hilda Braid in It Sticks Out Half a Mile.

She appears in "The Battle of Britain Reborn" and "Local Enthusiasm".

==== Laura Talbot (played by Poppy Lane) ====
Laura Talbot
- High & Dry character
- Created by: Harold Snoad and Michael Knowles
- Based on: Mrs Mainwaring
- Portrayed by: Poppy Lane

In-universe information
- Full name: Laura Talbot, née Archer
- Family: Richard Talbot (husband); Children; Ron Archer (brother); Trevor Archer (nephew)
- Children: Yes; two or more
- Nationality: British

Despite being an unseen character throughout the series, Laura Talbot appears in a photo on her husband's desk and is mentioned various times throughout the series. She is married to local bank manager Richard Talbot and her brother is Ron Archer. She moved to Midbourne just after the war in 1945 after her husband had secured a place for her and their children to stay. She is often described as being heavily built. Her relationship to her husband is a strained one; she is seen to shout at Richard through the telephone and is suspicious, or even paranoid, that Richard may leave her. This is mostly due to Richard's time spent at work and at the pier; Laura suspects her husband of having an affair.

Laura attends keep fit classes, and as a result Richard and her must have tea early before the classes begin. In "Trevor's Brainwave", Trevor says that Laura is 'very clever with the old dried egg', but in later episodes she is heard to have served lumpy custard to Richard, and, according to her husband, a fifteen year old pork pie reminds him of something she served for supper the previous night. According to Richard, she hasn't been the same since she saw Brief Encounter (the female lead, Celia Johnson, was also called Laura) and she thinks that her husband pays a resemblance to Trevor Howard (who played the male lead in the movie).

Laura Talbot is possibly based on Captain Mainwaring's wife from Dad's Army. Like Mrs Mainwaring, Laura is never seen onscreen (except for a photo on Richard's desk) and is mentioned throughout the series by others. She also shouts at Richard through the phone, a gag that was often seen in Dad's Army between Captain Mainwaring and his wife.

== Production and transmission notes ==
Yorkshire Television were unable to do any location filming for the series.

The theme tune was composed and sung by Neil Innes. During Episodes 7 and 8, another part of the theme tune not sung during the opening and closing titles can be heard.

The series was repeated in 1997 in the afternoon slot of UK Gold's Comedy Cupboard.
