= Frank Williams (actor) =

English actor (1931–2022)

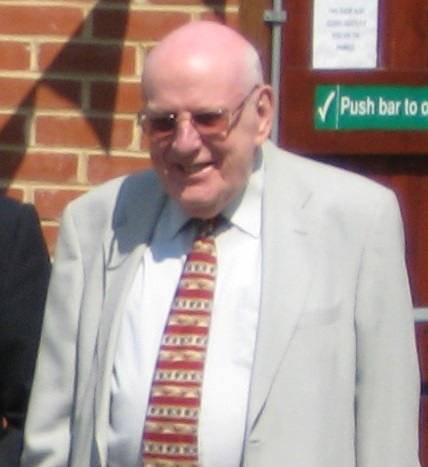
- Williams in 2011
- Born: Frank John Williams; 2 July 1931; Edgware, Middlesex, England
- Died: 26 June 2022 (aged 90); London, England
- Occupation: Actor
- Years active: 1953–2022
- Notable work: The Army Game, Dad's Army

Frank John Williams (2 July 1931 – 26 June 2022) was an English actor best known for playing the Reverend Timothy Farthing in the BBC television sitcom Dad's Army (1969–1977).

Often cast as a member of the clergy, Williams appeared in similar roles in sitcoms including The Worker, Vanity Fair, Hi-de-Hi! and You Rang, M'Lord? and film What's Up Nurse!. Williams reprised his role of the Reverend Mr. Farthing in the 2016 film adaptation of Dad's Army.

== Early life ==
Williams was born in Edgware, Middlesex, on 2 July 1931, to William Williams, a Welsh nonconformist, and his wife Alice (née Myles). He was educated at a school which temporarily functioned in St Andrew's Church, Edgware, and two private schools before attending Ardingly College, West Sussex, and Hendon School (then Hendon County School). Williams was an only child and in 1956 bought a house one and a half miles away from his parents' house.

== Career ==
Williams started his acting career in repertory theatre and worked with the Watford Palace Theatre, which was being run by Jimmy Perry, the creator of Dad's Army, some years later. Williams also met many of his future co-stars, including Michael Knowles, Colin Bean, Donald Hewlett and Mavis Pugh.

At the time, television was in its infancy and it was this sector of the industry that Williams wished to enter. He made several television appearances throughout the 1950s; during series one of The Army Game he made various small appearances and in 1957 was invited back as a regular character, the commanding officer Captain Pocket. Williams continued to play the role until the series ended in 1960. In total, he appeared in 116 episodes of The Army Game which were transmitted weekly.

Williams's first film appearance was as an uncredited extra in The Story of Gilbert and Sullivan in 1953, his first larger role came in 1956 with the film The Extra Day in which he played the role of Sid. Williams went on to appear in three films with Norman Wisdom including: The Square Peg (1958), The Bulldog Breed (1960) and A Stitch In Time (1963). He then appeared in films such as: Inn for Trouble (1960), Just for Fun (1963), Hide and Seek (1964), Headline Hunters (1968), One of Our Dinosaurs Is Missing (1975), Jabberwocky (1977), What's Up Nurse! (1977), The Human Factor (1979) and Oh! Heavenly Dog (1980). He had a leading role in the BBC TV series Diary of a Young Man (1964), which was partly directed by Ken Loach, in addition to small parts in numerous TV series of the 1950s and 1960s.

Williams's best-known role was in Dad's Army as the vicar. His first appearance on the show was in the episode "The Armoured Might of Lance Corporal Jones", which was the first episode of series three. He had worked with producers David Croft before on Hugh and I, and Jimmy Perry at the Watford Palace Theatre. He thought he had come to make a one-off appearance and did not realise that he would become a regular fixture of the show. He would go on to appear in half of the 80 episodes and both feature films. In 2021, Williams said of his time working on Dad's Army that "it was the happiest period of my professional life." Coincidentally, while at Hendon County, Williams wrote in his memoir, he had played the lead in the school play of his final year, The Ghost Train, written nearly thirty years earlier by Arnold Ridley, who would also appear in Dad's Army.

Williams featured with Tessie O'Shea in the short-lived sitcom As Good Cooks Go (1970). He appeared in an episode of All Gas and Gaiters as one of the vicars choral in episodes broadcast in 1967 and 1971. At the height of his Dad's Army fame, he had a cameo role in Monty Python's Flying Circus (1972), and later appeared as a record producer in the Rutles movie All You Need Is Cash (1978). He appeared in the short-lived television sitcom High & Dry (1987) as a bank clerk, and he made a cameo appearance in 'Minder', playing a tobacconist. He had a recurring role in You Rang, M'Lord?, a later series written by Jimmy Perry and David Croft. Williams played Lord Bishop Charles appearing in 14 out of a total of 26 episodes.

Williams was a guest on This Morning on Thursday 31 July 2008, talking about Dad's Army with fellow cast members Ian Lavender and Bill Pertwee. He also appeared on BBC1's Jonathan Ross Salutes Dad's Army show on Sunday 3 August 2008.

With other surviving members of the Dad's Army cast, Williams walked in the 100th Birthday parade for Queen Elizabeth The Queen Mother, because Dad's Army was her favourite programme. He was the author of several plays, including The Playing Fields and Murder Weekend, some of which have been performed in the pro-amateur theatre. His autobiography, Vicar to Dad's Army: the Frank Williams story, was published in 2002.

In 1993, Williams co-founded with Bill Pertwee the Dad's Army Appreciation Society. He was the society's vice president until Pertwee's death in 2013, when Williams became the president, attending many society events until his death.

Williams reprised his role of the vicar for the 2016 reboot of Dad's Army. He recalled his time on set of the new film: "It meant four days work, which I thoroughly enjoyed. The film was pretty successful but received a mixed reaction from Dad's Army fans because seeing other people playing roles made famous by the likes of Arthur and John wasn't easy to accept."

== Personal life ==
Williams lived in his hometown of Edgware, Greater London. A lifetime Christian, he was until 2000 a member of the House of Laity in the General Synod of the Church of England. He opposed the ordination of women and attacks on gay people.

Williams was the patron of Veneratio, a charity established to prevent the social isolation of the elderly.

In 2020, during the COVID-19 pandemic, Williams reported that "I share the house with my good friend Ronald Grainge, who I met on the Dad's Army stage show way back in 1975, so the two of us have been self-isolating and watching TV. We enjoy good dramas, and catch up with an old film occasionally." He then went on to say that the programmes which he enjoyed the most are "older comedies, but programmes like Would I Lie to You? are great fun. And chat programmes where comedy people get together."

In a 2017 Daily Telegraph interview, Williams answered a question on his best financial decision with "buying a house. ... Initially, I rented out the downstairs rooms and it produced some money but there were problems, like tenants not paying the rent. So, about ten years ago, my great friend Ronnie Grainge, who was in the Dad's Army stage show, moved in."

== Death ==
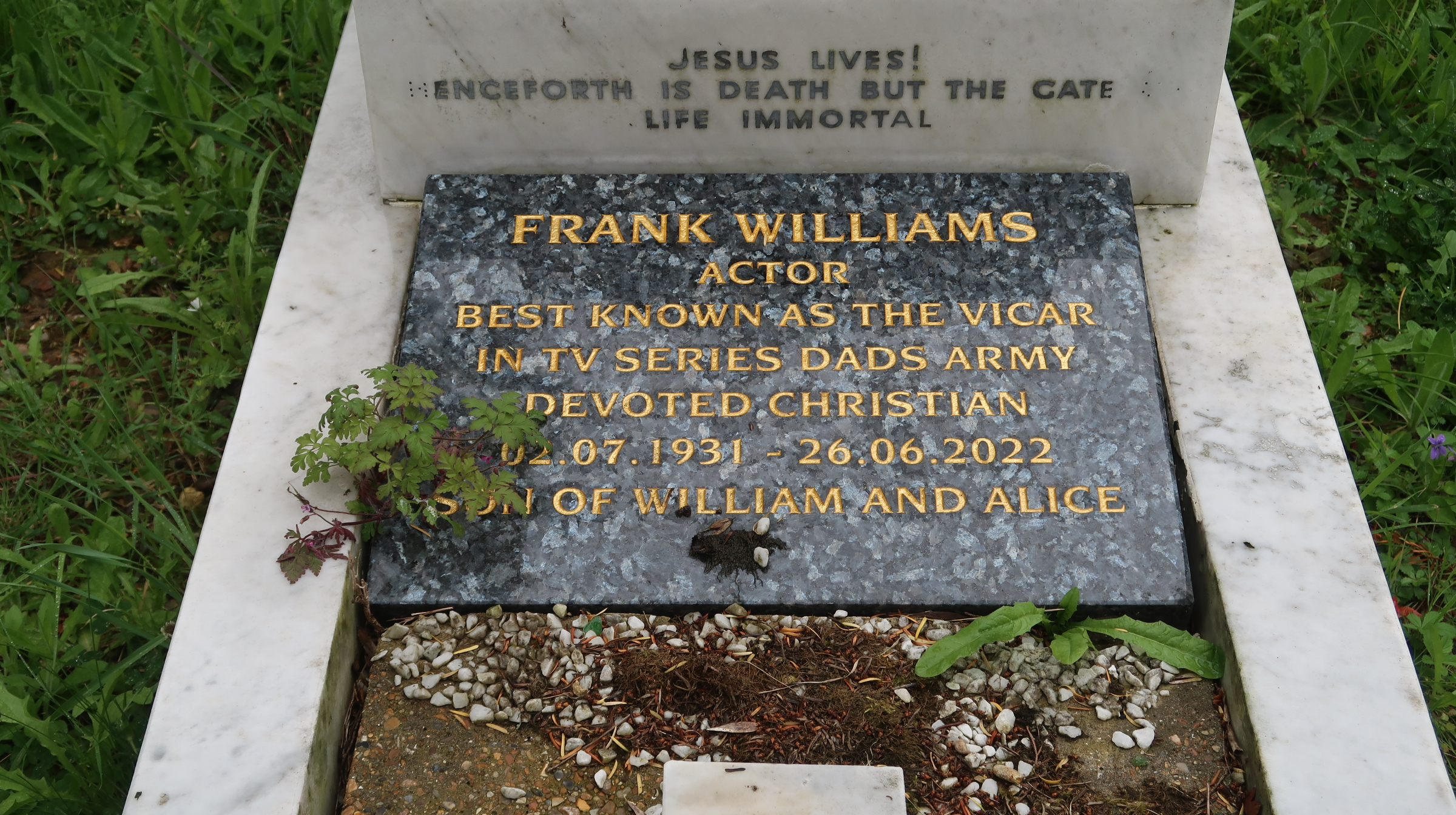
Frank Williams – Actor best known as the Vicar in TV series Dads Army, Devoted Christian 2 July 1931 – 26 June 2022 Son of William and Alice – St Margaret of Antioch, Edgware, London UK

Williams died on 26 June 2022, aged 90. A statement was released on Facebook saying "so sorry to say that our beloved friend, colleague and actor Frank Williams, passed away this morning."
