= Margot Boyd =

English actress (1913–2008)

Margot Boyd (born Beryl Billings, 24 September 1913 – 20 May 2008) was an English stage, television and radio actress. She grew up in Bath and trained as an actor at the Royal Academy of Dramatic Art (RADA). Here Boyd acted in a production supervised by George Bernard Shaw.

== Biography ==
After graduating from RADA, she gained work at the Leeds Theatre Royal Repertory Company, never seeming to play a leading role less than 55 years of age, she later commented. She later worked with Michael Redgrave at Stratford Memorial Theatre in 1953. In 1956 she appeared in One Bright Day at the Apollo Theatre in London. Redgrave cast her in the lead role of Noël Coward's Waiting in the Wings in 1960, with Coward himself becoming a friend when the production reached Dublin. On television, Boyd starred in the lead of Our Miss Pemberton (1957) and had many guest appearances in series such as Dixon of Dock Green, The Clifton House Mystery and Upstairs, Downstairs.

She appeared regularly in numerous radio dramas over four decades, including Dr. Finlay's Casebook, The Slide, and Share and Share Alike (radio series).

In later years, she was best known for playing Marjorie Antrobus in The Archers radio serial on BBC Radio 4 and Hilda Rumpole in The Splendours and Miseries of an Old Bailey Hack on the same station. As a member of the BBC Radio Drama Company in 1984, she was originally intended to make a one-off appearance in The Archers, but became a regular member of the cast. Her character was effectively written out in 2004, when Mrs. Antrobus moved to the local home for the elderly and became a silent character. Boyd died at the home for retired actors, Denville Hall, in Northwood, London.
