= Rogue's Rock =

British television series

Rogue's Rock is a British series broadcast from 1974 to 1976 as three separate series of 30 minute programmes. It was bracketed as "comedy adventure". Plots varied from comic to action plots, but the latter were largely effected by use of stock library footage. The first series contained six episodes, the second series thirteen episodes and the final third series eight episodes. The programme was produced by Southern Television and broadcast on ITV. Reruns were broadcast on Talking Pictures TV from December 2020.

The main writer was Royston Caws.

== Setting ==
All stories take place on Rogue's Rock: a supposed privately owned island off the south coast of England long-owned by the Rogue family. In reality it was filmed on the island of Herm in the Channel Islands and centred around Herm Harbour, with small boats featuring in all episodes.

Plots varied from Russian spies to romance but all had a somewhat parochial atmosphere. The first series centres on the arrival of two German strangers who are trying to find sunken treasure. Series two involved underwater beacons around the island.

The overall population seemed to come from all around the world and there were a wide array of accents, creating a cosmopolitan mix within a parochial context.

One typically extreme plot featured both the Bolshoi Ballet and New York Metropolitan Opera arriving on the island at the same time, each wishing to perform, and being offered the quarry as a venue.

== Regular characters ==
- Clive Morton as Commander Rogue (series 1)
- Donald Hewlett as his brother Wing Commander Julius Rogue (series 2 and 3) aka "Wingco"
- Royston Tickner as Will Polberry
- Harold Goodwin as Hawkins
- Graham Simpson as Tom
- Susan Dury as Jane Steele
- Michael Knowles as Nigel

== Other characters ==
- Vladek Sheybal as Boris Lubchenko
- Ed Bishop as Cyrus Triphammer
- Shirley Allen as Princess Zina (the African princess)
- Philip Madoc as Spinetti
- Kristin Hatfield as Katy
- Chubby Oates as Cyril
- Katya Wyeth as Ilse
- Anthony Chinn as Wu
- David Scheuer as Max
- Nicholas Amer as Uncle Achmed
