= Dagon in the Land of Weeds =

Japanese anime television series

- いきなりダゴン
- Based on: Dagon by Denis Bond and Ken Morton
- Written by: Nobuyuki Fujimoto; Yu Yamamoto
- Directed by: Kazuyoshi Yokota
- Music by: Kazunori Ishida
- Country of origin: Japan
- Original language: Japanese
- No. of episodes: 12

Production
- Executive producer: Koichi Motohashi
- Producers: Ryuji Matsudo; Masatoshi Kawata (TV Asahi)
- Production companies: TV Asahi; Nippon Animation

Original release
- Network: ANN (TV Asahi)
- Release: April 9 – June 25, 1988

Dagon in the Land of Weeds (いきなりダゴン, Ikinari Dagon) is a Japanese anime television series, based on the British childrens' book series by Denis Bond.
