= Vivienne Martin (actress) =

New Zealand-born English actress (1930–2023)

- Born: 28 December 1930; Kaitaia, New Zealand
- Died: 22 January 2023 (aged 92)
- Occupation: Actress
- Years active: 1950s–2000
- Notable work: It Sticks Out Half a Mile; King Street Junior
- Spouse: John Burgess (m. 1976)

Vivienne Ann Martin (28 December 1930 – 22 January 2023) was a New Zealand-born character actress. She had a career in British television, radio, stage and film which spanned over 40 years. She was best known for her portrayal of Mrs Lillian Rudd in the radio sitcom King Street Junior, of which she starred for the entire series from 1985 to 1998. She also starred in the radio sitcom It Sticks Out Half a Mile as Miss Perkins, and in eleven episodes of The Dick Emery Show from 1974 to 1980. From 1994 to 1995, she appeared in three episodes of the sitcom As Time Goes By, in which she played secretary Gwen Flack.

== Biography ==
Martin was born in Kaitaia, New Zealand on 28 December 1930. In the early 1950s, after receiving a bursary from the New Zealand Government, Martin moved to England in order to take up acting. In 1967, after starring in a number of unsuccessful musical comedy stage productions, Martin decided to focus her acting career on television roles.

Martin's first on-screen appearance was in the 1954 film The Belles of St Trinian's, in which she played Arabella. She landed her first television role in 1957 with The Benny Hill Show, but her first regular role was in the 1958 television adaptation of Pride and Prejudice, in which she played Lydia Bennet.

Martin appeared in many sitcoms throughout her career. Her first regular sitcom role was in the 1961 musical sitcom Moody In..., followed by the 1971 six-episode television series Keep It in the Family. She appeared in the second series of the ITV sitcom Up the Workers in 1976, and had a starring role as Miss Perkins in It Sticks Out Half a Mile, the radio sequel to Dad's Army. She again played the same character, now called Miss Baxter, in the television adaptations of the series: Walking the Planks in 1985 and High & Dry in 1987.

Martin was best known in her role as Mrs Rudd in the radio sitcom King Street Junior. She appeared throughout the sitcom's entire run, from 1985 to 1998.

From 1994 to 1995, Martin appeared in three episodes of the British television sitcom As Time Goes By, in which she played secretary Gwen Flack.

=== Personal life and death ===
In June 1976, Martin married British actor John Burgess; she was his third wife. Their marriage lasted just six weeks.

Martin died on 22 January 2023, at the age of 92. Her death was announced by the performing arts trade union Equity in their Spring/Summer 2023 magazine.

== Filmography ==
=== Film and television ===
Year	Title	Role	Notes
1954	The Belles of St Trinian's	Arabella	Film, first on-screen role
1954	Aunt Clara	Maid	Film, uncredited
1954	Carrington V.C.	Private Smith	Film, uncredited
1955	As Long as They're Happy	Kay	Film
1955	The Water Gypsies	Daisy Fig	Television film
1955	Secret Venture	Lola	Film
1957	Town on Trial		Film, uncredited
1957–60	The Benny Hill Show	Various	ATV series
1958	Hancock's Half Hour	Elizabeth	Episode: "Matrimony, Almost"
1958	Pride and Prejudice	Lydia Bennet	Five episodes
1958	Rush Hour		Episode: "Murder He Says"
1960	Two-Way Stretch	Fred's Wife	Film
1960	Bootsie and Snudge	Enid	Episode: "The Blind Date"
1960	BBC Sunday-Night Play	Fanny Marryot	Episode: "Tuppence in the Gods"
1961	The Benny Hill Show	Various	BBC series, Series 4
1961	Moody In...	Various	Musical sitcom
1961	Armchair Theatre	Robbie	Episode: "Tune on the Old Tax Fiddle"
1962	A Pair of Briefs	Hotel Maid	Film, uncredited
1963	Armchair Theatre	Daphne Perkins	Episode: "Little Doris"
1965	Public Eye	Eileen Osborne	Episode: "And a Very Fine Fiddle Has He"
1965	Undermind	Dorothy	Episode: "The New Dimension"
1967	Thirty-Minute Theatre	Frankie One	Episode: "Boa Constrictor"
1967	Before the Fringe	Various	Four episodes
1968	The Dickie Henderson Show	Mrs Ashburton	Episode: "The Amateur Professional"
1969	Playhouse	Judy Jenkins	Episode: "The Beauty Operators"
1970	Bachelor Father	Mrs Moore	Episode: "A Spot of Natural Expression"
1971	Keep It in the Family	Yvonne Bannister	
1971	Please Sir!	Miss Petting	Eight episodes
1972	Dead of Night	Jessie	Episode: "Two in the Morning"
1974	Z-Cars	Georgia Jones	Episode: "Certain Parties"
1974–80	The Dick Emery Show	Various	Eleven episodes
1976	Up the Workers	Mavis	Series 2
1979	Rings on Their Fingers	Girl in Restaurant	Episode: "Anniversary Jig"
1980	Angels	Audrey Mears	Two episodes
1980–81	The Good Companions	Elsie Longstaff	Miniseries, nine episodes
1982	Legacy of Murder	Mrs Harper	Episode: "Holy Smoke"
1982	The Further Adventures of Lucky Jim	Lollipop Lady	Episode: "The Ties That Bing"
1983	Spyship	Mrs Franklin	Miniseries, three episodes
1985	Walking the Planks	Miss Baxter	
1986	Ever Decreasing Circles	Diana Danby	Episode: "House to Let"
1987	High & Dry	Miss Baxter	
1987	Divided We Stand	Edna	Five episodes
1992	Garbo	Bin Lady with Budgie	Film
1993	The Bill	Mrs Fuller	Episode: "Return to Sender"
1993	Paul Merton: The Series		Series 2, Episode 2
1994–95	As Time Goes By	Gwen Flack	Three episodes
1996	EastEnders	Aunt Betty	One episode

=== Radio ===
Year	Title	Role	Notes
1967	Sam and Janet	Janet Marshall	
1983–84	It Sticks Out Half a Mile	Miss Perkins	
1985–98	King Street Junior	Mrs Lillian Rudd	
2000	King Street Junior Revisited	Mrs Lillian Rudd	Episode: "Centenary"

=== Theatre ===
Year	Title	Theatre	Role	Notes
1963	Oliver!	West End, London	Nancy	
1966	The Matchgirls	Globe Theatre, London	Kate	Lead role
1966	The Great Grimaldi	Palace Theatre, Manchester		
1967	The Ballad of Queenie Swann	Yvonne Arnaud Theatre, Guildford	Queenie Swann	Lead role
1984	Little Me	Prince of Wales Theatre, London	Mrs Eggleston	
