= Norman Macleod (musician) =

British musician and songwriter

Norman Macleod is a British musician and songwriter. He was a member of the 1950s group The Maple Leaf Four with his brother, the songwriter John Macleod. He took additional stage role "Private Maple" in the early performances of the Dad's Army stage show "Who do you think you are kidding Mr Hitler" in 1975, and EMI released the Dad's Army stage show single "Get Out And Get Under The Moon" sung with actor Bill Pertwee (a.k.a. ARP Warden Hodges).

== Discography ==
With The Maple Leaf Four

- "Old Shep" B-side "The Clock On The Wall" 1959
- Smokey Mountain Round-Up EP 1960 : "Mule Train", "Call Of The Canyon", "(Roll Along) Wagon Train", "Old Shep"

With the cast of Dad's Army stage show

- "Get Out And Get Under The Moon", composed Tobias-Jerome-Shay, producer John MacLeod
