= The Rough with the Smooth =

1975 British TV sitcom

- Genre: Sitcom
- Written by: Tim Brooke-Taylor; John Junkin
- Directed by: Jim Franklin; Harold Snoad
- Starring: Tim Brooke-Taylor; John Junkin
- Country of origin: United Kingdom
- Original language: English
- No. of series: 1
- No. of episodes: 7

Production
- Producer: Harold Snoad
- Running time: 30 minutes
- Production company: BBC

Original release
- Network: BBC 1
- Release: 16 July – 20 August 1975

The Rough with the Smooth is a British television sitcom which aired on BBC One. After appearing in 1971 as an episode of the Comedy Playhouse, a single series of six episodes was broadcast in 1975. The plot revolves two writers, one from East London and the other an Old Etonian, who live and work together on a radio serial. The serial, about a vicar running an urban church, is called "Concrete Pastures".

== Cast ==
=== Recurring ===
- Tim Brooke-Taylor as Richard Woodville
- John Junkin as Harold King
- Richard Hurndall as Mervyn Thackeray
- Jenny Till as Veronica
- Richard McNeff as Policeman
- Michael Knowles as Vicar

=== Single episodes ===
- Keith Skues as Radio actor
- Jonathan Cecil as George Robinson
- Allan Cuthbertson as The Salesman
- Robert Dorning as Mr. Andrews
- Sheila Fearn as Sally Thackeray
- Cyd Hayman as Leonie
- Reginald Marsh as Mr. Green
- Annette Andre as Irene Fellowes
- David Daker as Rudolph Culpepper
- Elaine Delmar as Marie
- Sue Lloyd as The American girl
- Barry Cryer as Duggie Doogood
- Bernard Holley as Supermarket Assistant
- Jenny McCracken as Nina
- Alan Tilvern as George
- John Cater as Peter
- Jenny Logan as Beryl
- Karin MacCarthy as Anita
- Jacki Piper as Helen
- Pamela Manson as Mrs. Andrews
- Larry Martyn as Simpson
- Barbara New as Mrs. Arbuthnot
- Christine Paul as Sammy
- Tina Martin as Lynda Andrews
- Ivor Salter as Taxi driver
- Tim Barrett as Hallidays' salesman
- Cleo Sylvestre as Rosalie

== Bibliography ==
- Christopher Perry. The British Television Pilot Episodes Research Guide 1936-2015. 2015.
