= Share and Share Alike (radio series) =

British radio sitcom (1978)

- Genre: Sitcom
- Running time: 30 minutes
- Country of origin: United Kingdom
- Language: English
- Home station: BBC Radio 4
- Syndicates: BBC Radio 4 Extra
- Starring: Hugh Paddick; Michael Robbins; Elizabeth Morgan; Denis Bond (writer)
- Written by: Harold Snoad; Michael Knowles
- Produced by: John Dyas
- Original release: 24 July – 18 September 1978
- No. of series: 1
- No. of episodes: 9

Share and Share Alike is a British radio sitcom that aired on BBC Radio 4 from 24 July to 18 September 1978. Written by Harold Snoad and Michael Knowles, the series starred Hugh Paddick and Michael Robbins as two brothers who must learn to live peacefully with one another to inherit the fortune from their mother's will.

== Cast ==
- Hugh Paddick as Leslie Burrows
- Michael Robbins as Jack Burrows
- Elizabeth Morgan as Janice
- Denis Bond (writer) as Ron

== Episodes ==
All episodes were written by Harold Snoad and Michael Knowles, and produced by John Dyas.

| No. | Title | Recorded | Original release date |
|---|---|---|---|
| 1 | "The Will" | TBA | 24 July 1978 |
Guest starring Deryck Guyler as the Solicitor.
| 2 | "The Codicil" | TBA | 31 July 1978 |
Guest starring Ron Pember as Sid.
| 3 | "Missing Persons" | 21 May 1978 | 7 August 1978 |
Guest starring Deryck Guyler as the Solicitor.
| 4 | "The Strike" | TBA | 14 August 1978 |
Guest starring Reginald Marsh as the Managing Director and George A. Cooper as the Shop Steward.
| 5 | "Age of Concern" | TBA | 21 August 1978 |
Guest starring Karin MacCarthy as Vivien.
| 6 | "Shared Interests" | 21 May 1978 | 28 August 1978 |
Guest starring Margot Boyd as the Instructor, Rosalyn Slater as the Receptionist and Peter O'Sullevan as the Racing Commentator.
| 7 | "The Film" | TBA | 4 September 1978 |
Guest starring Rob Pember as Sid and Frank Thornton as the Film Director.
| 8 | "Redundancy" | TBA | 11 September 1978 |
Guest starring Reginald Marsh as the Managing Director and George A. Cooper as the Shop Steward.
| 9 | "The Séance" | 22 November 1977 | 18 September 1978 |
Guest starring Deryck Guyler as Mr Brown and Henry McGee as Archie Cartwright.

== Production ==
An original pilot episode was recorded on 19 January 1975, but was never broadcast. Reg Varney and Roy Kinnear starred as the two brothers.

Producer John Dyas had previously worked as producer on the Dad's Army radio series, written by Harold Snoad and Michael Knowles and broadcast from 1974 to 1976. Sixty-seven episodes of the television series were adapted for radio.

== Archival status ==
Due to the BBC's policy of wiping material after broadcast, only three episodes of the series were kept in the BBC's archives: "Missing Persons", "Shared Interests", and the final episode, "The Séance". However, in 2001, as part of the BBC's Treasure Hunt campaign, Harold Snoad returned copies of the entire series, including the unbroadcast pilot episode, to the BBC's radio department.

== Media release ==
In November 2023, the series was commercially released for the first time, distributed by BBC Digital Audio as a digital audiobook.

== See also ==
- Dad's Army radio series, a series of adaptations, written by Snoad and Knowles, of the television series of Dad's Army
- It Sticks Out Half a Mile, a radio sitcom by Snoad and Knowles that ran from 1983 to 1984
