= Dad's Army Appreciation Society =

British television show fan club

- Logo
- Abbreviation: DAAS
- Formation: 1993
- Founders: Bill Pertwee; Frank Williams
- Members: 1,700+ (2009)
- Official language: English
- President: Jeffrey Holland
- Website: http://www.dadsarmy.co.uk/
- Formerly called: The New Dad's Army Appreciation Society (1993-1995)

The Dad's Army Appreciation Society is an organisation dedicated to the British television sitcom Dad's Army. It is run by a small group of individuals and has over 1,700 members.

== History ==
The Dad's Army Appreciation Society was originally formed in February 1990 by David Lovering, a Dad's Army fan, but it was shortly disbanded due to Lovering's work commitments.

Under the title The New Dad's Army Appreciation Society, the present society was founded in 1993 by Tadge Muldoon and Stephanie Castle, two fans of the show, who ran it from their home at Keighley in Yorkshire with the support of Jimmy Perry. The society published a regular newsletter. The society organised two public meetings in 1995: the first at the Victory Services Club near London's Marble Arch, attended by cast member Colin Bean, and the second at Chalfont St Giles in Buckinghamshire, the location used for Walmington-on-Sea in the 1971 feature film based on the series.

In June 1995, upon the death of Tadge Muldoon, Bill Pertwee (who played Warden Hodges) and Frank Williams (who played the Vicar), appointed a new Commander-in-Chief, Jack Wheeler, a fan of the show, who took on the running of the society, which at that time had a membership of around 300 members. Annual meetings were established, held each May at Thetford in Norfolk, the location used for Walmington-on-Sea in the television series. In 1998, to mark the thirtieth anniversary of the airing of the first episode in 1968, the society held its first major convention, at The Oval cricket ground in London, attended by all the surviving cast and crew. The society, in association with the Bressingham Steam Museum, later set up the Dad's Army Collection, which was officially opened on 14 May 2000 by Dad's Army creators Jimmy Perry and David Croft. Thetford (where much of the show was filmed) opened a Dad's Army Museum in 2007. In 2003, the secretary of the society, Tony Pritchard, designed a heritage trail for Dad's Army fans, in part funded through a grant from the European Union.

As of 2009, the society had 1,700 members, having grown from approximately 300-500 members in 1997 and 1998.

=== New Zealand branch ===
In March 1995, Dave Homewood founded a New Zealand branch of the DAAS, which ran for almost ten years. The society published a quarterly magazine, titled Platoon Attention!.

== Key figures ==
Position	Person
President	Jeffrey Holland
Vice President	Jonathan Pertwee
Membership & Enquiries	Tony Pritchard
Magazine Items & Enquiries	Paul Carpenter
Video and Audio Library	Andrew Biggs

== Events ==
The society holds many individual events around the country where they show and play rare Dad's Army items and footage. However, there is a main event in May/June when the society members meet up, have the annual society dinner, and go to the Dad's Army Collection at the Bressingham Steam and Gardens.

Events have included a gathering in 1998 at The Oval attended by a number of the original cast including Clive Dunn (1920-2012) and Ian Lavender (1946-2024) as well as the show's writers, Jimmy Perry (1923-2016) and David Croft (1922-2011), and a 1998 gathering at Cambridge (New Zealand) attended by Stephen Lowe, the son of the show's Arthur Lowe (1915-1982) who played Captain George Mainwaring. More recently, a 2009 gathering was held at Whitmore Hall; Frank Williams was able to attend and speak to the society's members, and, before his death, Colin Bean (who played Private Sponge in the series) regularly attended events, despite needing to use a wheelchair at the time. Since then (and from 1998), the society has arranged annual events based in or around Thetford, attended by the writers and cast members, including tours of the restricted STANTA Battle Area used for location filming. The society organised several events to commemorate the 50th anniversary of the Croft and Perry partnership in 2018.

== Permission To Speak, Sir! ==
The society publishes a members magazine called Permission To Speak, Sir!. Started by Tadge Muldoon in 1993, it includes society news, society merchandise and Dad's Army items for sale by members. Regular features are "Guest Appearances" and "Letters from Members".

In 2018, the Society published an updated version of the Dad's Army Companion to coincide with the fiftieth anniversary celebrations.

== Video and Audio Library ==
The Video and Audio Library features a large selection of video and audio items that can be borrowed by members. In December 2020, a special section of the society's website was set aside for fan fiction written by the members, the first submission was made in January 2021 and was entitled Dad’s Army Negotiates Brexit and was by Niles Schilder.

== List of presidents ==
- 1993–2013: Bill Pertwee
- 2013–2022: Frank Williams
- 2022–2026: Michael Knowles
- 2026–present: Jeffrey Holland

Vice presidents have included: Jeffrey Holland, Harold Snoad and Jonathan Pertwee (son of Bill Pertwee).
