= Who Do You Think You Are Kidding Jurgen Klinsmann? =

Song by Tonedef Allstars
- Language: English
- Genre: Parody music, novelty song
- Songwriter: Tonedef Allstars
- Composer: Tonedef Allstars

"Who Do You Think You Are Kidding Jurgen Klinsmann?" is a song by the English band Tonedef All Stars. It is set to the tune of the Dad's Army theme tune, "Who do you think you are kidding, Mr Hitler?" The song was released to coincide with the 2006 FIFA World Cup.

== History ==
The song was created as part of a competition run by The Sun to determine their official World Cup song. "Who Do You Think You Are Kidding Jurgen Klinsmann?" was selected as the winner. The song was first broadcast on 26 May 2006 on BBC Radio 2 on Chris Evans Drivetime.

The song was performed by Tonedef All Stars with boxer Frank Bruno, 1966 World Cup winners Geoff Hurst and Martin Peters, and Bill Pertwee, who played Warden Hodges in Dad's Army.

== Reception ==
It was initially believed by music journalists and bookmakers that the song would chart at a higher place than the official world cup song, "World at Your Feet" by Embrace. Embrace member Danny McNamara said that the song was "brilliant" and thought that it might beat Embrace in the charts. The song debuted in the UK Singles Charts at 13, behind "World at Your Feet" at 3. It spent four weeks in the charts, failing to improve on its initial 13th position after dropping to 27 in its second week.

Although appreciated by England fans, the song was not universally liked. Stylus Magazine called it "charming xenophobia", with it being suggested that The Football Association didn't like it because of the references to the war. The Germany national team manager Jürgen Klinsmann reportedly did not like the song because he disliked the connection that the song was comparing him to Adolf Hitler. Tony Christie, a singer with an entry in the competition, said that while he thought the video was "very good", he felt the change from "Hitler" to "Klinsmann" was unwise and suggested that people should "steer clear". Manchester Evening News criticised the performers, calling them "just a few celebrities on a karaoke machine"; however, they also stated that the song was "infuriatingly catchy".
