= Mr. Big (TV series) =

British TV comedy series

- Genre: Sitcom
- Written by: Christopher Bond; Peter Jones
- Directed by: Ray Butt; Dennis Main-Wilson
- Starring: Peter Jones; Prunella Scales; Ian Lavender; Carol Hawkins
- Country of origin: United Kingdom
- Original language: English
- No. of series: 2
- No. of episodes: 12 (+ pilot)

Production
- Producer: Dennis Main-Wilson
- Running time: 30 minutes
- Production company: BBC

Original release
- Network: BBC 1
- Release: 7 January – 4 August 1977

Mr. Big is a British comedy television series that originally aired as a pilot in 1974 on the Comedy Playhouse. It was followed by two series of six episodes each, both broadcast in 1977.

== Cast ==
=== Main ===
- Peter Jones as Eddie
- Prunella Scales as Dolly
- Ian Lavender as Ginger
- Carol Hawkins as Norma

=== Other ===
Guest stars included Ronald Fraser, David Kelly, Simon Williams, Geoffrey Hughes, Angela Thorne, Gorden Kaye, André Morell, Ballard Berkeley, Penny Irving, Victor Maddern, Norman Rossington, Bill Shine, April Walker and Alfie Bass.

== Bibliography ==
- Bright, Morris & Ross, Robert. Fawlty Towers: Fully Booked. BBC, 2001.
- Perry, Christopher. The British Television Pilot Episodes Research Guide 1936-2015. 2015.
- Sellers, Robert. Raising Laughter: How the Sitcom Kept Britain Smiling in the '70s. The History Press, 2021.
