= The Glums =

1979 British TV sitcom

- Genre: Sitcom
- Written by: Frank Muir; Denis Norden
- Directed by: John Kaye Cooper; John Reardon
- Starring: Jimmy Edwards; Ian Lavender; Patricia Brake
- Country of origin: United Kingdom
- Original language: English
- No. of series: 1
- No. of episodes: 8

Production
- Producer: Simon Brett
- Running time: 30 minutes
- Production company: London Weekend Television

Original release
- Network: ITV
- Release: 11 November – 30 December 1979

The Glums is a British television sitcom which first aired on ITV in 1979. It had its origins in a segment of the 1950s radio show Take It from Here. The characters were revived as part of Bruce Forsyth's Big Night variety show in 1978, and the following year were given a spin-off which lasted for one series of eight episodes. Frank Muir and Denis Norden adapted their original radio scripts for the series.

== Main cast ==
- Jimmy Edwards as Father
- Ian Lavender as Ron
- Patricia Brake as Eth
- Michael Stainton as Ted the landlord

== Bibliography ==
- Morgan-Russell, Simon. Jimmy Perry and David Croft. Manchester University Press, 2004.
- Slide, Anthony. Wake Up At The Back There: It's Jimmy Edwards. 2018.
