= Denis Bond (writer) =

British writer

Denis Bond (born 22 November 1946) is a British writer of children's books and television. His TV programmes include The Munch Bunch and Picme, and his books include Avenue, Pop Rivals and, for younger children, The Witch Who Loved To Make Children Cry.

== ITV series ==
Bond was trained in drama at the Rose Bruford College and acted on stage and TV. After a period of working as a teacher, he was commissioned to write 26 episodes for the ITV series Pipkins. He also wrote for the series Rainbow, Let's Pretend and The Munch Bunch.

== The Munch Bunch ==
Although Rainbow remains a cult classic, the Munch Bunch stands alone among the three for being written entirely by Bond. He had already begun writing a series of Munch Bunch books (launched under the pseudonym Giles Reed) a year previously.

== Dagon ==
His next publishing venture was a series of books about Dagon, a boy from space. These were published, like the Munch Bunch, by the Ipswich-based Studio Publications, but both ranges were terminated when a fire at Studio Publications destroyed all of the original artwork.

Dagon is also known as the original work of a Japanese anime television series Dagon in the Land of Weeds (Ikinari Dagon).

== Scholastic ==
Bond had two novels published by Methuen but success really came when he began being published by Scholastic. His first book for the publishers was The Dragon Who Couldn't Help Breathing Fire (1990) and, by 1994, he was having books for teenagers published as well. These included three books for Scholastic's Point Romance series under the pseudonym Denise Colby, a clear reference to the US TV series Dynasty, as well as a feminisation of his own name, No 1, an in-depth look at the dark side of the pop music scene, and Avenue, about a soap opera.

== Picme ==
Bond returned to the field of television with Picme an animated educational series written for the Irish broadcasters RTÉ. This has been nominated for a BAFTA.

== Workshops ==
As well as continuing to write, Denis Bond regularly conducts writing workshops at schools and libraries both in the UK and abroad.

== Select bibliography ==
=== For younger readers ===
- The Dragon Who Couldn't Help Breathing Fire (1990)
- The Train Who Was Frightened of the Dark (1992)
- The Granny Who Wasn't Like Other Grannies (1993)
- The Monster Who Couldn't Scare Anyone (1994)
- The Witch Who Loved To Make Children Cry (1996)
- The Shark Who Bit Things He Shouldn't (1998)
- The Big Bad Story Book (containing, The Witch Who Loved To Make Children Cry, The Dragon Who Couldn't Help Breathing Fire and The Monster Who Couldn't Scare Anyone) (2000)
- The Very Clever Farmer (illustrated by Steve Cox) (2000)

Except where stated, all of the above titles are illustrated by Valeria Petrone.

== For teenagers ==
- No 1 (1995)
- Avenue (2000)
- Pop Rivals (2004) a condensed version of No 1 published by Red Fox

== Point Romance (as Denise Colby) ==
- Two Weeks in Paradise (1994)
- Spotlight On Love (1995)
- Love Letters (1997)

== Radio ==
- Bond played the part of Ron in the nine-episode radio series Share and Share Alike (radio series), in 1978.
