= Not Now, Comrade =

1976 British film by Ray Cooney and Harold Snoad

- British quad poster
- Directed by: Ray Cooney; Harold Snoad
- Written by: Ray Cooney
- Based on: "Chase Me, Comrade" (play) by Ray Cooney
- Produced by: Martin C. Schute
- Starring: Leslie Phillips; Roy Kinnear; Windsor Davies; Don Estelle; Michelle Dotrice; Ray Cooney; June Whitfield; Carol Hawkins; Lewis Fiander; Ian Lavender
- Cinematography: Jack Hildyard
- Edited by: Peter Thornton
- Music by: Harry Robinson
- Production company: Not Now Films (Independent)
- Distributed by: EMI (UK)
- Release date: December 1976
- Running time: 89 minutes
- Country: United Kingdom
- Language: English
- Budget: £175,000

Not Now, Comrade is a 1976 British comedy film directed by Ray Cooney and Harold Snoad and starring Leslie Phillips, Windsor Davies, Don Estelle and Ian Lavender. It was shot at Elstree studios as the sequel to Not Now, Darling (1973), and was the second in an intended series of "Not Now" films, with Not Now, Prime Minister pencilled in as a follow-up. But box office returns for this film, unlike those of its predecessor, were disappointing. It was the only feature film directed by Snoad.

== Plot ==
Russian ballet dancer Rudi Petrovyan wants to defect. Unable to reach the British embassy and pursued by the KGB, he hides out with, and falls for, stripper Barbara Wilcox. But Rudi's planned escape in the boot of a Triumph backfires when he climbs into the wrong car, and he ends up in the country home of unsuspecting naval Commander Rimmington.

== Cast ==
- Leslie Phillips as Commander Rimmington
- Roy Kinnear as Hoskins
- Windsor Davies as Constable Pulford
- Don Estelle as Bobby Hargreaves
- Michele Dotrice as Nancy Rimmington
- Ray Cooney as Mr Laver
- June Whitfield as Janet Rimmington
- Carol Hawkins as Barbara Wilcox
- Lewis Fiander as Rudi Petrovyan
- Ian Lavender as Gerry Buss
- Richard Marner as 1st Russian official
- Michael Sharvell-Martin as 2nd Russian official

== Stage origins ==
Cooney's 1964 play Chase Me, Comrade was based on the 1961 defection of Rudolf Nureyev. First appearing in 1964 at the Theatre Royal, Windsor, Cooney himself played Gerry Buss. The play became a Whitehall farce running for 765 performances between 1964 and 1966. It was televised by the BBC's Laughter from the Whitehall in August 1964 and again in December 1967. In 1966 Cooney published a novelisation of the play. In 1981 Dutch television transmitted a version of the play called Een Kus van een Rus.

== Production ==
Not Now Darling had been financed by Tigon Pictures who went broke. Not Now Comrade was financed by EMI. Richard Stone, an agent, wrote about the film that "Bernie Delfont, now at EMI, backed us, but it was a stinker!"

The film was shot at Elstree Studios in March 1976.

== Songs ==
Don Estelle sings "Not Now" (lyric: Sammy Cahn, music: Walter Ridley).

== Critical reception ==
The Monthly Film Bulletin wrote: "Barbara removes her clothes and enthusiastically twirls her tasselled breasts; the ballet dancers posing for photographers in front of the Albert Hall spontaneously break into dance; Rudi mistakenly leaps into Rimmington's car; Barbara buttons up her blouse while angrily driving after him round Hyde Park. Having provided this obligatory glimpse of a semi-nude woman, Not Now, Comrade settles into the familiar round of harmless double entendres buried in the ramifications of a mistaken-identity plot played by the familiar troupers of British farce – Roy Kinnear, the gardener perpetually on the point of repressed sexual combustion; Leslie Phillips, still the self-regarding gay blade, here complete with naval beard and yellow Bentley; June Whitfield, Nancy's homely Mum; Windsor Davies, the doubting hob-nailed Constable, and Don Estelle, arbitrarily brought on in the last reel to partner him in yet another re-run of their Indian Army routine. Master of ceremonies Ray Cooney delivers the film's most embarrassing lines (the drunken Laver indulges in cloying baby-talk) and co-directs the mirthless proceedings at great speed but in a style derived from the dated traditions of the Whitehall Theatre."

The British Comedy Guide called the film "a really delightful forgotten gem of British cinema comedy".

The Radio Times called it a "horrid comedy of errors," adding "for the sake of a hard-working cast, let's draw a discreet Iron Curtain over the whole charade."

Time Out said it was "from the darkest days of British cinema, a farrago which began life as Cooney's Whitehall farce, Chase Me, Comrade."
