= Comedy Map of Britain =

BBC documentary series

Comedy Map of Britain is a BBC documentary series which visits the places that have inspired many of Britain's leading comedians. It first aired on BBC Two in 2007 and 2008.

Narrated by veteran broadcaster Alan Whicker, comedians included in the two series include Angus Deayton, Anton Rodgers, Arthur Smith and Hale and Pace, Bill Bailey, Chris Moyles, the Chuckle Brothers, Dudley Moore, Eric Idle, Graham Fellows, Hugh Grant, Ian Hislop, Ian Lavender, Jim Davidson, Jon Culshaw, Mark Thomas, Maureen Lipman, Michael Palin, Paul Merton, Richard Whiteley, Ricky Gervais, Ronni Ancona, Rowan Atkinson, Roy Chubby Brown, Steve Coogan, Syd Little and Eddie Large, Terry Jones, Leigh Francis and many others.
