= Windsor Davies =

British actor (1930–2019)

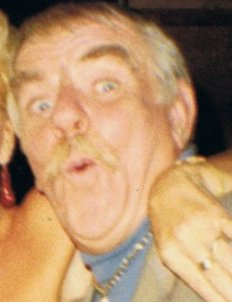
- Davies during filming of Never the Twain
- Born: 28 August 1930; Canning Town, Essex (now London), England
- Died: 17 January 2019 (aged 88) near Toulouse, France
- Occupation: Actor
- Years active: 1961–2004
- Spouse: Eluned Evans (m. 1957; died 2018)
- Children: 5

Windsor Davies (28 August 1930 – 17 January 2019) was a British actor. He is best remembered for playing Battery Sergeant Major Williams in the sitcom It Ain't Half Hot Mum (1974–1981) over its entire run. The show's popularity resulted in Davies and his co-star Don Estelle achieving a UK number-one hit with a version of "Whispering Grass" in 1975. He later starred with Donald Sinden in Never the Twain (1981–1991), and his deep Welsh-accented voice was heard extensively in advertising voice-overs.

== Early life ==
Davies was born on 28 August 1930 in Canning Town, East London, to Welsh parents. In 1940 they returned to their native village of Nant-y-moel, Glamorgan. Davies studied at Ogmore Grammar School and worked as a coal miner. He performed his National Service in Libya and Egypt, with the East Surrey Regiment, between 1950 and 1952. Following teacher training at Bangor Teacher Training College, he taught English and Maths at Leek in Staffordshire, and at a school in Elephant and Castle, south London.

Davies had become active in amateur dramatics, including the Bromley Little Theatre, and took a short drama course with a Kew theatre company. He became a professional actor at the age of 31 and began working at the Cheltenham repertory theatre in 1961.

== Career ==
=== Television ===
Davies' best known role was as Battery Sergeant Major Williams in the British sitcom It Ain't Half Hot Mum (1974–1981), who was modelled on similar individuals Davies had met as a soldier during his national service. "Bastards, real bastards some of them were. They knew it, too, and took pride in it", he said. Among his character's catchphrases was "Shut Up!!", delivered as an eardrum-shattering military scream. Another phrase was "Oh dear, how sad, never mind", delivered in a dry, ironic manner, and used when others around him had problems. Journalist Neil Clark, contributing to The Times in 2005, described his performance as the "definitive portrayal of a bullying and uneducated sergeant-major" and reported Spike Milligan was of the opinion that Davies' role was "the funniest comic performance he had ever" watched. Davies and co-star Don Estelle had a number-one hit in the UK with a semi-comic version of "Whispering Grass" in 1975.

His other television roles included the sailor Taffy in the first of the BBC series The Onedin Line (1971), a boat captain in an episode of Special Branch, a special branch detective in Callan (1972), and the antique dealer Oliver Smallbridge in Never the Twain (1981–1991), with Donald Sinden. In the field of science fiction television, Davies appeared in the 1967 Doctor Who story "The Evil of the Daleks" as Toby; and was the voice of Sergeant Major Zero (a spherical robotic soldier in charge of 100 other spherical robotic soldiers) in the 1983 Gerry Anderson–Christopher Burr production Terrahawks.

He was the subject of This Is Your Life in 1976 when he was surprised by Eamonn Andrews.

In September–October 1985, Davies played the lead role of George Vance, a museum custodian elevated to the peerage, in the six-part BBC Two comedy series The New Statesman. This was based on the play by Douglas Watkinson and is not to be confused with the later sitcom of the same name. (Colin Blakely played the role of Vance in a pilot episode transmitted on BBC2 in December 1984.)

Davies also featured in the BBC comedy sitcom Oh, Doctor Beeching!, written by David Croft and Richard Spendlove, as the Lord Mayor in an episode broadcast in 1997. He also featured in an episode of 2 Point 4 Children in 1999, as Ben's long-lost Uncle Ion.

=== Films ===
In the cinema, Davies played major roles in two Carry On films, Behind (1975) and England (1976), in the latter again as a sergeant major. He played Mog in the Welsh rugby film Grand Slam (1978), and was a sergeant in the Highland Regiment in Adolf Hitler: My Part in His Downfall (1973) with Jim Dale and Spike Milligan. In 1989, he revived the role of Sergeant Major Williams in a 30-minute Royal Air Force training film, Hazardous Ops.

=== Voice work ===
Davies' distinctive voice was heard in commercials for New Zealand's Pink Batts house insulations and confectionery ads for Cadbury's Wispa and for Heinz Curried (baked) Beans. He also appeared alongside New Zealand rugby union coach Alex Wyllie in New Zealand advertisements for Mitre 10 hardware stores in the early 1990s. Davies and Wyllie had worked together previously on the rugby-themed film Old Scores in 1991.

In the 1970s, he read an edition of BBC Radio 4's Morning Story programme, and also narrated the audiobook for the Ladybird children's classic Treasure Island. He sang and voiced many characters in the Paul McCartney film Rupert and the Frog Song in 1984, and appeared in that year's children's film Gabrielle and the Doodleman as three different characters (the Ringmaster, the Black Knight, and an Ugly Sister). In 1984, he auditioned to be the voice of the UK's speaking clock.

== Personal life ==
In 1957, he married Eluned Lynne Evans; the couple had four daughters and a son. Eluned died in September 2018. The couple lived just outside Toulouse in the south of France, and he was a keen birdwatcher.

He died on 17 January 2019, aged 88, four months after the death of his wife.

== Filmography ==
- The Pot Carriers (1962) - Police Constable
- Murder Most Foul (1964) - Sergeant Brick
- The Alphabet Murders (1965) - Dragbot
- Arabesque (1965) - Policeman in Car Crash (uncredited)
- The Family Way (1966) - Man in Crowd (uncredited)
- Drop Dead Darling (1966) - Radio Engineer
- Assignment K (1968) - Bill (uncredited)
- Hammerhead (1968) - Police Sergeant
- Frankenstein Must Be Destroyed (1969) - Police Sergeant
- UFO (British TV series) The Cat with Ten Lives (1970) - Morgan (Gate Security Guard) (uncredited)
- The Mind of Mr. J.G. Reeder (1969–1971) - Chief Inspector Pyne
- Clinic Exclusive (1971) - Geoffrey Carter
- Endless Night (1972) - Sgt. Keene
- Adolf Hitler: My Part in His Downfall (1973) - Sgt. MacKay
- Soft Beds, Hard Battles (1974) - Bisset (uncredited)
- Mister Quilp (1975) - George
- Carry On Behind (1975) - Fred Ramsden
- Confessions of a Driving Instructor (1976) - Mr. Truscott
- Carry On England (1976) - Sergeant-Major 'Tiger' Bloomer
- Not Now, Comrade (1976) - Constable Pulford
- Grand Slam (1978, TV movie) - Mog Jones
- The Playbirds (1978) - Assistant Police Commissioner
- Terrahawks (1983–1986; voice only) - A children's science fiction programme
- Gabrielle and the Doodleman (1984) - Ringmaster / Black Knight / Ugly Sister
- Rupert and the Frog Song (1985, short) - Rupert's Father / Father Frog (voice)
- “Hazardous Ops.” (1989) - RAF training film
- Old Scores (1991) - Evan Price
- The Thief and the Cobbler (1993) - Chief Roofless (voice)
- The Willows in Winter (1996, TV movie) - Commissioner of Police (voice)
- Mosley (1998, Mini-series) - David Lloyd-George

== Discography ==
=== Albums ===
Year	Album	UK	Notes	Sources
1975	Sing Lofty	X	With Don Estelle	
1978	Bless You For Being An Angel	X	With Don Estelle	
1978	Do I Worry	X	With Don Estelle	
1983	Rudyard Kipling The Jungle Book	X	Audiobook	

=== Singles ===
Year	A-side	B-side	UK	Notes	Sources
1975	"I Don't Want to Set the World on Fire"	"I Don't Want to Set the World on Fire"	X	With Don Estelle	
1975	"Whispering Grass"	"I Should Have Known"	1	With Don Estelle	
1975	"Paper Doll"	"When I Learn To Love Again"	41	With Don Estelle	
1976	"I Don't Want to Set the World on Fire"	"What a Wonderful World"	X	With Don Estelle	
1976	"Nagasaki"	"Anything Is Possible"	X	With Don Estelle	
1979	"Cool Water"	"Muck Spreadin' Charlie"	X	With Don Estelle	
