= Don Estelle =

English actor (1933–2003)

- Estelle as Lofty in It Ain't Half Hot Mum
- Born: Ronald Edwards; 22 May 1933; Crumpsall, Manchester, Lancashire, England
- Died: 2 August 2003 (aged 70); Rochdale, Greater Manchester England
- Resting place: Rochdale Cemetery, Rochdale, Greater Manchester, England
- Other name: Rolly
- Occupations: Actor, singer
- Years active: 1954–2001
- Television: It Ain't Half Hot Mum; Dad's Army
- Height: 145 cm (4 ft 9 in)
- Spouses: Mary Heywood (m. 1955; div. 1972) Elizabeth Amy Brent (m. 1974)

Don Estelle (22 May 1933 – 2 August 2003) was an English actor and singer, best known as Gunner "Lofty" Sugden in It Ain't Half Hot Mum. In 1975, he recorded "Whispering Grass" with co-star Windsor Davies, which spent three weeks at number one in the UK.

== Early life ==
Born Ronald Edwards in Crumpsall, Manchester, he was brought up in a house on Russell Street in the area. During the Second World War, at the age of eight, he was evacuated to Darwen, Lancashire to escape the Manchester Blitz. It was there he found his voice as a boy soprano at the local Holy Trinity Parish Church, and on returning home after the war, he continued singing at St Mary's Church, Crumpsall. He later joined a charity group, the Manchester Kentucky Minstrels, and with them, performed "Granada" in the 1954 talent show What Makes a Star? at BBC Radio's northern studios in Manchester.

Estelle worked at a soft furniture shop before his career in acting took off. In the day he worked at the shop and by night was singing in clubs around Northern England.

== Career ==
=== Early career ===
Estelle, whose real name was Ronald Edwards, chose his stage name by combining the name of a Levenshulme ladies fashion shop "Estelle Modes" with advice from a co-worker that "Don" sounded better than "Ron" and became Don Estelle, and started finding work as an extra on many shows taped at the Granada Studios.

Estelle gained experience by singing one song 12 times a week in the show The Backyard Kids at the Hulme Hippodrome in Manchester. In the early 1960s he appeared as an extra on many episodes of Coronation Street, sat inside the Rovers Return Inn or walking up and down the street. His time on the Coronation Street set and his club singing interfered with his job at the furniture shop and was eventually fired. Estelle then softened out and according to him: "I drank a lot, had a moustache, wore a medallion around my neck, I was crazy, romantic".

He met the actor Windsor Davies in 1962 at the Garrick Theatre in London and the two men formed an act which toured theatres and clubs for four years. Estelle had small roles in Dad's Army (playing a Pickfords removals man in one 1969, episode and an ARP warden called Gerald in three more in 1970).

=== It Ain't Half Hot Mum ===
He eventually gained the role of Gunner "Lofty" Sugden in the sitcom It Ain't Half Hot, Mum, which was first broadcast in January 1974 and ran until September 1981, reuniting him with Davies, whose sergeant major character often mocked Lofty in the storylines. The character was given the ironic nickname of Lofty because of Estelle's 4 ft 9 in (145 cm) stature.

Estelle's powerful tenor operatic singing voice was featured in It Ain't Half Hot, Mum, and became a staple in Lofty's character. In 1975, Davies asked Estelle if he wanted to restart their double act, however this time in character as SJM Williams and Gunner Lofty. Realising that double acts had to sing in addition to comedy, Estelle went through his record collection and found the single "Whispering Grass", a song by The Ink Spots he had bought for a sixpence many years ago, and recorded the song; as Davies could not sing, he instead provided spoken word and backing vocals in his distinctive baritone voice; their semi-comic version of "Whispering Grass" went to number one in the UK in June 1975, spending three weeks at the top of the charts and selling half a million copies. This was followed by a cover of "Paper Doll" which reached number 41, their second and last single to chart, and a top ten LP, Sing Lofty (1976), all three recorded with Davies. Estelle's solo album (not featuring Davies), "Lofty" Sings, peaked at number ten in the album charts.

=== Later career ===
After It Ain't Half Hot Mum ended in 1981, Estelle found it hard to find auditions. He was offered the occasional one-off gig at a night club and was asked to film a few adverts, however he hated filming them as they apparently took too long to shoot and Estelle felt that the producers were paying him less than what he should have and they relied too much on the "Lofty" look.

Estelle also acted in the films Not Now, Comrade (1976) and A Private Function (1984), in addition to Santa Claus: The Movie (1985) alongside Melvyn Hayes, who also appeared in It Ain't Half Hot Mum. In the first series of The League of Gentlemen, he made brief appearances in two episodes as Little Don, the keeper of the Roundabout Zoo, a zoo on a traffic island. In 2001, he appeared in an episode of Linda Smith's A Brief History of Timewasting as Little Don of the East End Art Mafia.

In his autobiography, Sing, Lofty: Thoughts Of A Gemini (1999), Estelle was extremely bitter about modern-day entertainment producers, describing them as being "tight-crutched, white-trousered morons". According to his obituary in The Independent, "in recent years Estelle cut a slightly sorry figure, dressed in his 'Lofty' outfit, setting out a stall of his tapes and singing to passers-by in shopping centres." He appeared as a "dirty old man" in the promotional video for The Sun Page Three Girl Jo Hicks's single "Yakety Sax" in 2001 (based on the theme from The Benny Hill Show). Estelle produced a duo recording with Sir Cyril Smith, by then the former MP for Rochdale. The six-track CD, which included "The Trail of the Lonesome Pine", was available by mail order in 1999.

== Personal life ==
Estelle briefly moved to Christchurch, New Zealand, where he spent countless hours working with jazz/blues pianist Malcolm Bishop. According to Bishop, "Lofty was clearly looking for someone to pass the figurative baton on to. He was extremely generous with time, his resources, and a shortbread that he loved made for him by a local friend. On the evening before Don returned to the UK I sat with him in his living room until after 4 am as he so passionately encouraged and advised me in my own career. Even though we had discussed business for after his return to New Zealand, part way through the evening I realised this would be the last time I would see my friend."

== Death ==
Beyond reuniting with family and friends, the reasons for Estelle's UK visit were twofold. The BBC was filming a documentary on the history of British comedy and had requested interviews. He also needed a liver transplant, but he became too weak for doctors to operate. Estelle returned to the UK weeks before his death. He died in Rochdale Infirmary on 2 August 2003, and was buried in Rochdale with the oversized pith helmet he wore as Gunner "Lofty" Sugden. He was survived by his second wife, Elizabeth.

== Filmography ==
Year	Title	Role	Notes
1968	Playhouse	Short football hooligan	Uncredited
1969–1970	Dad's Army	Gerald/2nd ARP warden/Pickfords man	Four episodes
1974–1981	It Ain't Half Hot Mum	Gunner "Lofty" Sugden	Fixty-six episodes
1975	The Benny Hill Show	Various characters	One episode
1975	Seaside Special	Himself	One episode
1975	The Basil Brush Show	Himself	One episode
1975	The Saturday Special: All This and Ronnie Corbett Too	Himself	One episode
1975	Crackerjack!	Himself	One episode
1975	Top of the Pops	Gunner "Lofty" Sugden (performer)	Five episodes
1975	The Good Old Days	Himself	One episode
1975–1999	This Is Your Life	Himself	Four episodes (for Michael Bates, Windsor Davies, David Croft and George Layton)
1976	Not Now, Comrade	Bobby Hargreaves	Film
1976–1980	Multi-Coloured Swap Shop	Himself	Four episodes
1977	Your Move	role unknown	One episode
1977	Saturday Night at the Mill	Himself	One episode
1977	Stars on Sunday	Himself	One episode
1978	Look Who's Talking	Himself	One episode
1978–1981	Star Turn	Himself	Four episodes
1978–1980	The Generation Game	Himself	Two episodes
1981	A Midsummer Night's Dream	Starveling	TV movie
1982–1984	3-2-1	Himself / Ernie Bond 003	Two episodes
1983	The Beggar's Opera	Crook fingered Jack	TV movie
1984	On Safari	Himself	One episode
1984	A Private Function	Barraclough	Film
1985	Wogan	Himself	One episode
1985	Blankety Blank	Himself	One episode
1985	Santa Claus: The Movie	Groot	Film
1986	Sunday, Sunday	Himself	One episode
1989	Sky Star Search	Himself / Show judge	One episode
1992	Don't Tell Father	Mr. Ridley	One episode
1995	Omnibus	Himself	One episode
1997	Tellystack	Himself	One episode
1999	The League of Gentlemen	Little Don	Two episodes
2000	Top Ten	Himself	One episode
2000	After They Were Famous	Himself	One episode
2001	Never Mind the Buzzcocks	Himself	One episode

== Discography ==
=== Albums ===
Year	Album	UK	Notes	Sources
1975	Sing Lofty	X	With Windsor Davies	
1976	"Lofty" Sings	10		
1977	Beautiful Dreamer	X		
1978	Bless You For Being An Angel	X	With Windsor Davies	
1978	Do I Worry	X	With Windsor Davies	
1979	Sing Songs For Christmas	X		
1979	Time After Time	X		
1984	With A Song In My Heart	X		
1985	Lonely Wine	X		

=== EP's ===
- 1999 — The Trail of The Lonesome Piles — with Cyril Smith — The Trail of the Lonesome Pine / The Crazy Years / Love Hurts / I Write the Song / Devil Woman / One for My Baby

=== Singles ===
Year	A-side	B-side	UK	Notes	Sources
1975	"I Don't Want to Set the World on Fire"	"I Don't Want to Set the World on Fire"	X	With Windsor Davies	
1975	"Whispering Grass"	"I Should Have Known"	1	With Windsor Davies	
1975	"Paper Doll"	"When I Learn To Love Again"	41	With Windsor Davies	
1976	"I Don't Want to Set the World on Fire"	"What a Wonderful World"	X	With Windsor Davies	
1976	"If You'd Really Cared"	"Not Now"	X		
1976	"Nagasaki"	"Anything Is Possible"	X	With Windsor Davies	
1977	"Only You"	"It Matters To Me"	X	With Harry Robinson and The Mike Sammes Singers	
1979	"Cool Water"	"Muck Spreadin' Charlie"	X	With Windsor Davies	
1979	"Pretend"	"Restless Wind"	X		
1980	"The Green Cross Code Song"	"Is It True"	X	With David Prowse and The Green Cross Code	
1980	"Walk On By"	"Blue Bayou"	X		
1981	"Beautiful Dreamer"	"Rose-Marie"	X		
1981	"Little Donkey"	"Auld Lang Syne"	X	With The Mold Green Folk Group Choir	
1982	"Rule, Britannia!"	"Goodbye"	X	With Jack Douglas	
1983	"Ecoutez Ma Chanson"	"I Have An Empty Space Within My Heart"	X		
1989	"Not So Much Waste"	"It Still Hurts"	X		
