= Angus Barnett =

English actor (born 1963)

- Born: 1963 (age 62–63); Ruddington, Nottinghamshire, England
- Occupation: Actor
- Years active: 1987–present

Angus Barnett (born 1963) is an English actor known for his role of Mullroy in the Pirates of the Caribbean film series and the British ITV series Dead Man Weds (2005). He was born and brought up in Ruddington, Nottinghamshire and attended West Bridgford Comprehensive School. He trained as an actor at Bristol Old Vic Theatre School.

== Theatre ==
In 1997 he was part of a hand-selected cast for the Japan-Thai Contemporary Theatre Joint Production of Red Demon in a joint production of the Japan Foundation and the Setagaya Public Theatre. The production was written and directed by Hideki Noda, and performed with a cast of 14 Thai actors and Barnett, carefully selected by Noda himself. It was first performed for three days at Theatre Tram at the end of 1997.

== Film and television ==
Barnett has appeared in many television and film productions over the years, most usually in 'character roles' rather than starring ones. This has led to his being cast by many high-profile directors, including Gore Verbinski, Martin Scorsese, Bryan Singer, George Miller and Marc Forster. The director Nigel Cole, cast Barnett in three separate films, Calendar Girls, Made in Dagenham and The Wedding Video.

=== Filmography ===
- Consuming Passions (1988) as Josiah's Son
- Lorenzo's Oil (1992) as Suddaby's Junior Manager
- Black Beauty (1994) as Ned Burnham
- FairyTale: A True Story (1997) as Second Reporter
- Uncle Gilbert & the Hurlo-Thrumbo (1997) as Bert
- Sabotage! (2000) as Marvin
- Pirates of the Caribbean: The Curse of the Black Pearl (2003) as Mullroy
- Calendar Girls (2003) as Orchid Photographer
- Finding Neverland (2004) as 'Nana' / Mr. Reilly
- Colour Me Kubrick (2005) as Ace
- Irish Jam (2006) as Milos O Shea
- Copying Beethoven (2006) as Krenski
- Sixty Six (2006) as Stan Shivers
- Flood (2007) as Bill
- Pirates of the Caribbean: At World's End (2007) as Mullroy
- Seared (2008) as Policeman 1
- St. Trinian's II: The Legend of Fritton's Gold (2009) as Drunken Sailor
- Made in Dagenham (2010) as Passing Van Driver
- Albatross (2011) as Man Guest
- Hugo (2011) as Theatre Manager
- The Wedding Video (2012) as Reverend Dobbs
- Jack the Giant Slayer (2013) as Foe
- Up All Night (2015) as Gene Peck
- Pirates of the Caribbean: Dead Men Tell No Tales (2017) as Mullroy
- Jellyfish (2018) as Vince
- Trautmann (2019)
- Cottontail (2023)

=== Television ===
- High & Dry (1987) as Trevor Archer
- Hot Metal (1988) as Jezz
- The Storyteller (1988) as Servant 1
- Boon (1988) as Roger, Electrician
- Square Deal (1988) as Alan
- Hannay (1989) as Cromwell Thorpe
- Birds of a Feather (1991) as Video Repair Man
- Adam Bede (1991) (TV film)
- The Queen's Nose (1998 & 2000) as PC Williams
- Alice in Wonderland (1999) (TV film) as Four Of Hearts
- The Strangerers (2000) as Fluids
- Shackleton (2002) (TV film) as Wounded Soldier
- Outlaws (2004) as Ron the Con
- Holby City (2004) as Ian Franklin
- Dead Man Weds (2005) as Cliff the Clutch
- M.I.High (2007) as Brent Gilbert
- Miss Marie Lloyd - Queen of The Music Hall (2007) (TV film) as Mr. Belafonte
- Christmas at the Riviera (2007) (TV film) as Ellis
- Fairy Tales (2008) as Dr. Wolf
- Skins (2008) as Big Bob
- Massive (2008) as Nico
- Little Dorrit (2008) as horsedealer Slingo
- Crusoe (2008) as Isbister
- Doctors (2009) as Micky Greening
- The Gemma Factor (2010) as Kenny Grantham
- Midsomer Murders (2011) as Kenny Pottinger
