= Bill Pertwee =

English actor (1926–2013)

Bill Pertwee MBE
- Born: William Desmond Anthony Pertwee; 21 July 1926; Amersham, Buckinghamshire, England
- Died: 27 May 2013 (aged 86); Truro, Cornwall, England
- Occupation: Actor
- Years active: 1959–1997
- Spouse: Marion Rose (m. 1955; died 2005)
- Children: 1
- Relatives: Michael Pertwee; Jon Pertwee; Sean Pertwee; Roland Pertwee

William Desmond Anthony Pertwee (21 July 1926 – 27 May 2013) was an English actor. He played Chief ARP Warden Hodges in Dad's Army and P.C. Wilson in You Rang, M'Lord?.

== Early life ==
Pertwee was born in Amersham, Buckinghamshire, on 21 July 1926. He was youngest of three boys of a Brazilian mother and an English father, James Francis Carter Pertwee, who travelled the country as a salesman until he became ill and died in 1938, when Bill Pertwee was 12. The family moved home many times during Pertwee's childhood and he lived in Hereford, Glasbury, Colnbrook, Newbury, Erith, Belvedere, Blackheath, Storrington, Westcliff-on-Sea, Wilmington and Worthing.

His education was disrupted by the moves and he attended many schools including an independent convent school, a small independent school, followed by Frensham Heights School in Surrey, Dartford Technical College and Southend College.

Pertwee left school during the Second World War and worked for a company that made parts for Spitfire cannons. He was declared unfit for RAF service as he was on medication following a swimming accident, but was a member of the Air Training Corps (UK Air Cadets). He later worked as an accounts clerk at the Stock Exchange and as a salesman for the clothing retailer Burberry in London.

== Entertainment career ==
Pertwee appeared in the radio comedy series Beyond Our Ken (1959–1964) and Round the Horne (1965–1967). He was also a warm-up act for television shows.

His most prominent role was that of ARP Warden Hodges in Dad's Army, which he played in both the original television series from 1968 to 1977, and the radio adaptations, as well as the radio sequel It Sticks Out Half a Mile, set after the war. Pertwee was president of the Dad's Army Appreciation Society and the author of the book Dad's Army – The Making of a Television Legend.

In July 2008 he and other surviving members of the Dad's Army cast gathered together at the Imperial War Museum on the 40th anniversary of the show's first broadcast in 1968. He also made appearances on This Morning. In 1975 he took part in the Dad's Army stage show and with Norman Macleod released the Dad's Army single "Get Out And Get Under The Moon", with Pertwee's B-side song "Hooligans" on EMI.

Pertwee appeared in two Carry On films – Carry On Loving (1970) and Carry On Girls (1973). His appearance in Carry On at Your Convenience (1971) was cut from the final film. His other film appearances include The Magnificent Seven Deadly Sins (1971), Psychomania (1973), as postmen in the film versions of Love Thy Neighbour and Man About the House, Confessions of a Pop Performer (1975), What's Up Nurse! (1977) and What's Up Superdoc! (1978).

On television Pertwee appeared in the final episode of It Ain't Half Hot Mum (1981) and an episode of Hi-de-Hi! (1986). He played PC Wilson in You Rang, M'Lord? (1988–1993), another creation of Jimmy Perry and David Croft.

The subject of This Is Your Life in 1999, Pertwee was surprised by Michael Aspel at the Imperial War Museum. In 2006, he performed in the World Cup song, "Who Do You Think You Are Kidding Jurgen Klinsmann?"

In 2011 a portrait of Pertwee, painted by a local artist, was unveiled in the Dad's Army Museum, Thetford where it now resides. Pertwee was patron of the museum and of the DAAS (Dad's Army Appreciation Society) until his death.

== Personal life ==
Pertwee married Marion Macleod, sister of John and Norman Macleod of the Maple Leaf Four, in 1955. They had a son, Jonathan James Pertwee (born in 1966), who has appeared in various TV programmes, including guest starring in the final episode of Oh Doctor Beeching!, co-created by Dad's Army co-creator David Croft.

Following the death of his wife, he lived in Topsham, Devon. He was awarded an MBE in the Queen's 2007 Birthday Honours list for his services to charity. He was vice-president of the "Railway Ramblers" and a member of the executive committee of the Entertainment Artistes' Benevolent Fund ('The Royal Variety Charity') and was initiated in 1976 as a member of the Grand Order of Water Rats.

Pertwee died aged 86 on 27 May 2013. He had been ill since the previous year and died peacefully at his home in Cornwall. Three days previously he had attended a parade in Thetford (home of the Dad's Army Museum) where spectators and museum volunteers remarked how frail he was looking.

Pertwee's brother James Raymond "Jiggy" Pertwee was an RAF Whitley Bomber pilot who was killed in a crash on a hillside close to a disused quarry above Bank Foot, near Ingleby Greenhow in North Yorkshire, following a leaflet drop over Dortmund, Germany, in June 1941.

He was related to Michael Pertwee and Jon Pertwee, being a second cousin of Michael's and Jon's father, the screenwriter and actor Roland Pertwee. He was godfather to one of the sons of his Dad's Army co-star Ian Lavender.

== Film/TV/radio ==
=== Film ===
Year	Title	Role	Notes
1970	Carry On Loving	Barman	
1971	Dad's Army	ARP Warden Hodges	
1971	The Magnificent Seven Deadly Sins	Cockney Man	(segment "Lust")
1971	Carry On at Your Convenience	Manager of Whippit Inn	(scenes deleted)
1973	Psychomania	Publican	
1973	Love Thy Neighbour	Postman	
1973	Carry On Girls	Fire Chief	
1974	Man About the House	Postman	
1975	Confessions of a Pop Performer	Husband with javelin	
1977	What's Up Nurse!	Flash Harry Harrison	
1978	What's Up Superdoc!	Woodie	
2012	Run for Your Wife	1st man getting off bus	(final film role)

=== Television ===
Year	Title	Role	Notes
1968–1977	Dad's Army	ARP Warden Hodges	Recurring role, 60 episodes
1969	Two in Clover	Policeman	5 episodes
1971	Bless This House	Mr Crawford	Episode: The Morning After The Night Before
1972	The Generation Game	Courtroom Clerk	Series 2, Episode 2
1973	Sykes	Builder	Episode: Protest
1984–1986	Chance in a Million	Sergeant Gough	6 episodes
1987	Edward and Friends	Voice	9 episodes
1988–1993	You Rang, M'Lord?	P.C.Wilson	26 episodes
1990	Fred The Steam Fugitive	Mr Jenkins	Time to Go TV short
1994	Woof!	Arthur	Episode: Getting up Steam

=== Radio ===
Year	Title	Role	Notes
1959–64	Beyond Our Ken	Various	100 episodes
1965–67	Round the Horne	Various	50 episodes
1971, 1972	The Motorway Men	Reg Ponsonby	8 episodes + pilot
1974-76	Dad's Army	ARP Warden Hodges	
1983-4	It Sticks Out Half a Mile	Bert Hodges	13 episodes
