= Ian Lavender =

English actor (1946–2024)

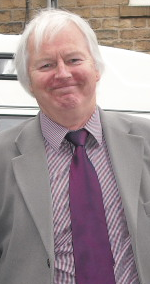
- Lavender in 2011
- Born: Arthur Ian Lavender; 16 February 1946; Birmingham, England
- Died: 2 February 2024 (aged 77); Stowlangtoft, Suffolk, England
- Resting place: St. Mary the Blessed Virgin Churchyard, Woolpit, Suffolk, England
- Occupation: Actor
- Years active: 1967–2019
- Spouses: Suzanne Kerchiss (m. 1967; div. 1976) Miki Hardy (m. 1993)
- Children: 2

Arthur Ian Lavender (16 February 1946 – 2 February 2024) was an English stage, film and television actor. He played the role of Private Pike in Dad's Army between 1968 and 1977, a BBC sitcom set during World War II, of which he was the last surviving main cast member. He also portrayed Derek Harkinson in the BBC soap opera EastEnders from 2001 to 2005, and again from 2016 to 2017.

== Early life ==
Arthur Ian Lavender was born to Edward and Kathleen (née Johnson) Lavender in Birmingham, England on 16 February 1946. He attended Bournville Boys Technical School (later Bournville Grammar-Technical School for Boys) where he appeared in many school dramatic productions. From there he went to the Bristol Old Vic Theatre School, with the assistance of a grant from the City of Birmingham. Following his graduation in 1967 he appeared on stage in Canterbury.

== Career ==
Lavender's first television appearance was as the lead in a Rediffusion play entitled Half Hour Story: Flowers at my Feet in 1968.

=== Dad's Army ===
In 1968, aged 22, Lavender was cast as Private Frank Pike, the youngest member and "stupid boy" of the platoon in the BBC sitcom Dad's Army. This made him a household name and gave him the great advantage of working alongside a number of experienced actors during his formative years, helping him to hone his acting skills. He appeared in the entire run of the series, and in the spinoff film released in 1971. He appeared in 1974 in one episode of Man About the House (While The Cat's Away) as Mark, an aspiring actor consumed by his own vanity. He reprised the part of Pike in the BBC Radio sitcom It Sticks Out Half a Mile. The sitcom was a radio sequel to Dad's Army, but ran for only one series.

Lavender continued to be associated with Dad's Army, and took part in occasional fan conventions and cast reunions. He made a variety of appearances during 2008 in connection with the 40th anniversary of the series. These included a reunion with surviving cast members in July 2008, and an appearance on BBC1's Jonathan Ross Salutes Dad's Army in August.

Lavender also recorded a special introduction for the 'lost' colour episode of Dad's Army entitled "Room at the Bottom", which was broadcast on 13 December 2008. In 2014 Lavender appeared at the Edinburgh Festival Fringe in a show with Steven McNicoll entitled Don't tell him, Pike!, in which Lavender talked about his time on Dad's Army and the subsequent effect it had on his career.

Lavender made a cameo appearance as Brigadier Pritchard in the 2016 Dad's Army film, providing a link with the original series. (Note: Frank Williams reprised his role as Reverend Timothy Farthing – thus making him and Lavender the only two actors from the original series to appear in the film.)

In 2022, after the death of Frank Williams, Lavender became the last surviving member of the main cast.

=== After Dad's Army ===
After Dad's Army, Lavender returned to the theatre, including a role in a production of Shakespeare's The Merchant of Venice. Between 1971 and 1973 Lavender joined Dad's Army colleague Arthur Lowe on the BBC radio comedy Parsley Sidings. He was in a BBC radio comedy series, a spin-off from Dad's Army called It Sticks Out Half a Mile. Lavender also appeared in films and television series, one of which (Mr. Big, 1977) featured him starring alongside Peter Jones and Prunella Scales. During the 1970s he appeared as a supporting actor in a number of British 'low farce' films, including one Carry On film – Carry On Behind (1975).

Lavender was reunited with producer David Croft for the television series Come Back Mrs. Noah (1977–78, co-written by Croft with Jeremy Lloyd), though it was unsuccessful. A revival of The Glums (1978–79), at first as part of a Bruce Forsyth variety series, proved rather more satisfactory, being adapted from scripts for the 1950s radio series Take It From Here that were written by Frank Muir and Denis Norden.

Lavender then appeared in several other television comedy shows during the 1980s, including two episodes of Yes Minister, and a lead role in the short-lived The Hello Goodbye Man (1984). He also appeared on ITV's television game show Cluedo (1990), based on the board game. During the 1980s Lavender continued to appear occasionally in television comedy roles including a bit-part as a burglar alarm salesman in the BBC sitcom Keeping Up Appearances. He made an appearance in Goodnight Sweetheart as two different parallel universe versions of the time-travelling lead character's son Michael. He also provided the lead voice of BBC children's animation PC Pinkerton in 1988. In 1998 he appeared as Joe Porter in a production of Hollywood Pinafore at the Barbican Centre in London.

In 2001 Lavender joined the BBC soap opera EastEnders, playing the role of Derek Harkinson, a gay friend of Pauline Fowler. He continued in EastEnders for four years, with storylines mainly involving the Fowler family, before leaving the serial in 2005. On 4 November 2016, it was announced that Lavender would make a brief return to the show.

Lavender then toured with The Rocky Horror Show musical, playing the Narrator. He also played the part of a patient in the 5 May 2007 episode of Casualty on BBC. In late 2007, he toured in the comedy play Donkey's Years. In May 2008, Lavender appeared in the BBC documentary series Comedy Map of Britain.

Over Christmas 2008, Lavender appeared in Celebrity Mastermind. As presenter John Humphrys asked his name, fellow contestant Rick Wakeman shouted 'Don't tell him, Pike!', a reference to Captain Mainwaring's most famous line from Dad's Army. At the start of 2009, Lavender appeared as a guest character in an episode of the CBBC sitcom, The Legend of Dick and Dom. Lavender starred in the film, 31 North 62 East (released September 2009), an independent psychological thriller starring John Rhys-Davies, Marina Sirtis, Heather Peace and Craig Fairbrass.

Lavender appeared as Monsignor Howard in the West End theatre production of Sister Act the Musical. The musical opened at the London Palladium on 2 June 2009, and ran through to October 2010. In January 2011, Lavender appeared at the Slapstick Silent Comedy Festival in Bristol. Lavender introduced Sherlock Jr., a 1924 silent film directed by and starring Buster Keaton.

In early 2013, Lavender appeared as The Mikado in three concert performances of the Gilbert and Sullivan opera, taking place in The Royal Festival Hall, London, the Symphony Hall, Birmingham and the Bridgewater Hall, Manchester. In August 2013 he made his Edinburgh Fringe debut in a stage version of The Shawshank Redemption.

In November 2014, Lavender made a cameo appearance in the film remake Dad's Army directed by Oliver Parker, released in February 2016. In February 2015 he was a recipient of one of The Oldie magazine's "Oldie of the Year Awards" – specifically the "Stupid Oldie Boy of the Year".

On 9 May 2015, Lavender gave a reading at VE Day 70: A Party to Remember in Horse Guards Parade, London that was broadcast live on BBC1.

In 2017, Lavender appeared alongside Rula Lenska, Johnny Ball, Judith Chalmers and Diana Moran in the reality show A Celebrity Taste Of Italy for Channel 5. During filming he fell ill with sepsis, and spent some time in an Italian hospital before returning to the UK to recuperate.

In 2019, Lavender appeared alongside Maureen Beattie, Jonathan Harden, Helen Vine and Rosin Rae in the mental health radio monologue series Talking Taboos, produced by Vine.

== Personal life and death ==
Lavender grew up supporting Aston Villa F.C.. When filming began on Dad's Army, he was allowed to choose Pike's scarf from an array in the BBC wardrobe. Lavender, who was colourblind, chose a claret and blue scarf (the colours of Aston Villa) to remind him of his home city. He was a big cricket fan.

On 22 June 2015, Lavender was awarded a star on the Birmingham Walk of Stars.

Lavender was first married to actress Suzanne Kerchiss. They had two sons. Kerchiss appeared as Pike's girlfriend, Ivy, in one episode of Dad's Army. Lavender married a second time to Michele (Miki) Hardy in 1993.

He survived bladder cancer, and a heart attack in mid-2004. Lavender died on 2 February 2024, two weeks short of his 78th birthday. His death was announced three days later. His funeral took place at Saint Mary's Church, Woolpit, Suffolk, on 29 February.

== Filmography ==
=== Film ===
Year	Title	Role	Ref.
1971	Dad's Army	Private Pike	
1975	Three for All	Carlo	
1975	Confessions of a Pop Performer	Rodney	
1975	Carry On Behind	Joe Baxter	
1976	Not Now, Comrade	Gerry Buss	
1976	Adventures of a Taxi Driver	Ronald	
1977	Adventures of a Private Eye	Derek	
2009	31 North 62 East	John Mandelson	
2014	The Hooligan Factory	Granddad Albert	
2016	Dad's Army	Brigadier Pritchard	

=== Television ===
Year	Title	Role	Notes	Ref.
1968–1977	Dad's Army	Private Pike	80 episodes	
1974	Man About the House	Mark	Episode: "While the Cat's Away"	
1975	Rising Damp	Platt	Episode: "Stand Up and Be Counted"	
1977	Mr. Big	Ginger	12 episodes	
1977–1978	Come Back Mrs. Noah	Clive Cuncliffe	6 episodes	
1978–1979	The Glums	Ron Glum	8 episodes	
1982	Yes Minister	Dr Richard Cartwright	2 episodes	
1984	The Hello Goodbye Man	Denis Ailing	6 episodes	
1995	Keeping Up Appearances	Security Representative	Episode: "Hyacinth Is Alarmed"	
1998	Goodnight Sweetheart	Michael Sparrow	Episode: "My Heart Belongs to Daddy"	
1999; 2007; 2008	Casualty	Benny Jenkins/Gordon Cunningham	4 episodes	
2000; 2005; 2007; 2011	Doctors	Peter Rogers/Rowland Beckley/Trevor Barnstaple/Ian Bardwell	4 episodes	
2001–2005, 2016–2017	EastEnders	Derek Harkinson	240 episodes	
2014	Stella	Keith Jackson	1 episode	
2014	Holby City	Norman Lodge	1 episode	

=== Radio ===
- Parsley Sidings, BBC Radio 2, 1971–73 – Bertrand Hepplewhite
- Dad's Army, BBC Radio 4 series adopted from the television series 1974-1976, Frank Pike
- It Sticks Out Half a Mile, BBC Radio 2, 1983-84 - Frank Pike
- A Cuckoo in the Nest by Ben Travers. BBC Radio 4, 1983 - Peter Wykeham
- Rookery Nook by Ben Travers, BBC Radio 4, Saturday Night Theatre, Saturday 24 August 1985 – Gerald Popkiss
- Mischief by Ben Travers, BBC Radio 4, 1986 - Henry
- The 4:50 from Paddington, BBC Radio 4 adaptation , 1996 - Det Insp Craddock
- The Mirror Crack'd from Side to Side, BBC Radio 4 adaptation, 1998 - Chief Inspector Craddock
- A Murder Is Announced, BBC Radio 4 adaptation, 1999 - Detective Inspector Craddock
