= List of Dad's Army books and memorabilia =

This is a list of books and memorabilia relating to the BBC television and radio sitcom Dad's Army.

== Annuals ==
Publishing annuals based on a current television series was common in the 1970s. World Distributors published six Dad's Army annuals between 1973 and 1978. Aimed mainly at children, they included short stories (some loosely based on TV episodes but most written for each annual), games, puzzles and historical information about World War II and the Home Guard. Photographs in the 1973 Annual were mainly from the film, with photographs in other issues taken from the TV series.

Dad's Army Annual 1973, ISBN 978-0-7235-0142-8.
Text stories: Which Way To Walmington?, Parachute Invasion, The Anti-Jerry Device, Souped-up Tactics!, The Platoon on Manoeuvres, False Alarm!, The New Recruits
Cartoon strip stories: Guerilla Warfare, Invasion

Dad's Army Annual 1974, ISBN 7-235-02099-7.
Text stories: Horror for Hodges, The Regimental Mascot, Mum's Army, The Official Inspection, Sealed Instructions, A Ghoul on the Loose, Dad's Army Joins the Navy
Cartoon strip stories: Jones Saves the Day, The Great Defenders

Dad's Army Annual 1975, ISBN 978-0-7235-0233-3.
Text stories: Operation Evacuees, Down on the Farm, The Riding Lesson, Midnight Marauders, Take Shelter, The Social Evening, Ready Steady Blow!, The Captain's Lucky Day
Cartoon strip stories: Sausage and Bash, Enemy Invasion

Dad's Army Annual 1976, ISBN 978-0-7235-0319-4.
Text stories: Yo Ho Hodges, The Usurper, Tomorrow's Heroes, Ladies First!, Roll 'Em!, The Captain Plays Cards
Cartoon strip stories: Fishy Business, The Documents

Dad's Army Annual 1977, ISBN 978-0-7235-0350-7.
Text stories: Gorilla Warfare, Night Manoevres, Tank Tactics, A Case of Mistaken Identity, A Star Is Born, The Captains Clanger
Cartoon strip stories: Raising a Stink, The Magnificent Eleven

Dad's Army Annual 1978, ISBN 7-235-04380-6.
Text stories: Fire! Fire!, Once a Soldier Always a Soldier, On Course With the Captain, Friends or Foes?, Operation Evacuees!
Cartoon strip stories: Getting to Betsy, The Hero

== Fiction ==
Dad's Army Sketches by Nico Broekhuis. City Stone Publishing, 2023. ISBN 978-1-9153-9917-5. A book of sketches of the main characters from episodes of Dad's Army.

Dad's Army by John Burke, Hodder, 1971. ISBN 0-340-15027-0.
A novelisation of the film.

Dad's Army Cartoon Book, Piccolo, 1973. ISBN 0-330-23759-4. This contains six comic stories written by R.A.G Clarke and drawn by Bill Titcombe (in black and white) : Operation Spycatcher, Dad's Army Goes to Sea, Operation Blunderbuss, Dad's Army in the Red, Operation Spit-and-Polish, Sure-fire Mainwaring!. 96 pages. Price 20p.

Dad's Army: The Defence of a Front Line English Village by Paul Abelman, BBC Books, 1989. ISBN 0-563-20850-3.
A retelling of some events in the TV series, based on Captain Mainwaring's diary and "edited by Arthur Wilson M.A."

== Script books ==
Dad's Army by Jimmy Perry and David Croft, Elm Tree Books, 1975. ISBN 978-0-241-89251-0. Foreword by Arthur Lowe.
TV scripts of "Asleep in the Deep", "The Deadly Attachment", "The Godiva Affair", "Everybody's Trucking" and "Keep Young and Beautiful". It included character and actor profiles, production notes, historical information and period newspaper articles about the Home Guard.

Dad's Army – The Lost Episodes by Jimmy Perry and David Croft, Virgin Books, 1998. ISBN 1-85227-757-2.
TV scripts of "Operation Kilt", "The Battle of Godfrey's Cottage", "The Loneliness of the Long Distance Walker", "Sgt. Wilson's Little Secret", "A Stripe for Frazer" and "Under Fire".

Dad's Army – Walmington Goes To War by Jimmy Perry and David Croft, Orion Books, 2001. ISBN 0-7528-4153-X.
The complete TV scripts of series 1–4, including "Battle of the Giants!"

Dad's Army – The Home Front by Jimmy Perry and David Croft, Orion Books, 2001 ISBN 0-7528-4743-0.
The complete TV scripts of series 5–8.

== Non-fiction ==
Dad's Army – The Making of a Television Legend by Bill Pertwee, Foreland Films, 1989. ISBN 1-872699-28-6.
Republished by Pavilion Books, 1997. ISBN 1-86205-176-3.

Dad's Army – A Celebration by Richard Webber with Jimmy Perry and David Croft, Virgin Books, 1997. ISBN 0-7535-0307-7.

Dad's Army Song Book, Wise Publications, 1995. ISBN 0-7119-5141-1.
Music and lyrics of Who do you think you're kidding Mr. Hitler? and other wartime songs.

The Dad's Army Handbook by Tony Pritchard and Paul Carpenter, Dad's Army Appreciation Society, 1998.
The first attempt at a comprehensive Dad's Army reference book.

The Complete A to Z of Dad's Army by Richard Webber with Jimmy Perry and David Croft, Orion Books, 2000. ISBN 0-7528-1838-4.

Dad's Army – The Story of A Classic Television Show by Graham McCann, 4th Estate, 2001. ISBN 1-84115-308-7.

The Best of British Comedy-Dad's Army by Richard Webber

== Memorabilia ==
In addition to books, memorabilia and merchandise were manufactured throughout the run and continued many years after.

- At least 10 jigsaw puzzles with pictures from the TV series.
- A set of 25 cigarette cards featuring scenes from the film was released in 1971.
- Two board games, one as a promotion by Ovaltine in 1971 and another in 1974.
- A Pan/Piccolo book of their adventures in comic form with storylines by R.A.G. Clarke and pictures by Bill Titcombe. It was released in 1973 and cost 20p in the UK. It contained six stories.
- Models of Jones' and Hodges' vans, a Walmington-on-Sea taxi, and a Walmington newspaper van were part of a Radio Times promotion.
- Corgi released 1:50 scale models of a Thornycroft van as Jones the butcher's van and Bedford 0 Series as Hodges’ van. Each came with a figurine of the character.
- The Imar Models series of 1:32 scale World War II figurines includes a "Home Guard Captain" which, although not advertised as such, bears a striking resemblance to Captain Mainwaring.
- Foundry Models released a series of Home Guard figurines as part of the "England Invaded!" series. Although not directly advertised as such, the figurines were clearly based on characters from the series. Available were different models depicting members of the platoon (Mainwaring, Wilson, Pike, Frazer, Jones and Godfrey) in various poses, along with a "civilian" collection featuring figurines based on Hodges, the Vicar, Verger and Mrs Pike.
- Warlord games has released a box of 18 Dad's Army figurines in army and civilian clothes.

== Museums ==
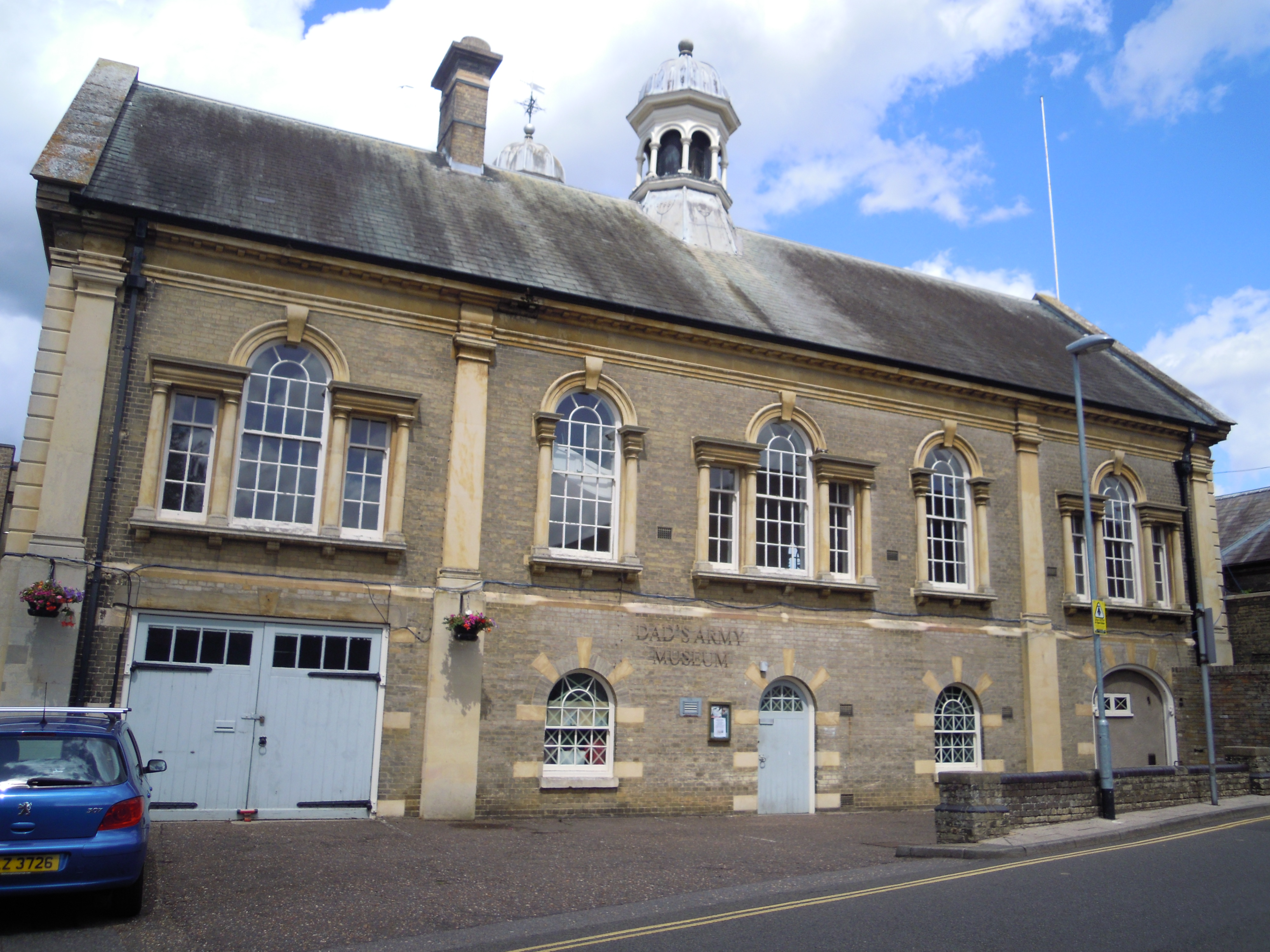
The exterior of the Dad's Army Museum in Thetford

A large collection of Dad's Army memorabilia can be seen in the Bressingham Steam Museum in Norfolk, close to where most of Dad's Army was filmed.

The Dad's Army Museum in Thetford, the Norfolk town where the TV series was filmed, is dedicated entirely to Dad's Army. The town has established a tourist attraction The Dad's Army Trail, which guides fans of the show through Thetford to all the major filming locations and places of significance.

Blitz and Pieces is a museum in Scratby in Great Yarmouth based on the British Home Front during World War II and on Dad's Army. The museum has a replica of Captain Mainwaring's church hall office and has screen-used props including half of the string used in The Deadly Attachment. The museum is open to the public by appointment.
