= Ring Dem Bells =

- Dad's Army episode
- "Do you mean to say you've dragged us—front-line troops—on a fool's errand like this?" The platoon, dressed up as Nazi soldiers for a film, are informed shooting has been postponed. The episode was noted for Ian Lavender's performance as Pike pretending to be a German officer.
- Episode no.: Series 8 Episode 1
- Directed by: David Croft
- Story by: Jimmy Perry and David Croft
- Original air date: 5 September 1975
- Running time: 30 minutes

Episode chronology
← Previous "Turkey Dinner"	Next → "When You've Got to Go"

"Ring Dem Bells" is the first episode of the eighth series of the British comedy series Dad's Army. It was originally transmitted on 5 September 1975.

== Synopsis ==
The platoon are going to be featured in a film to help the war effort, but are annoyed to find they are playing the Nazis. Chaos ensues when they are mistaken for real German soldiers, triggering an invasion alert.

== Plot ==
The platoon are to be featured in a film to help the war effort. Private Pike, a keen cinema-goer, is excited but once Colonel Pritchard and the film producers arrive to measure them for uniforms, it becomes clear that the men are going to be playing the Nazis. Despite his protests, Captain Mainwaring is informed that they will be only in the distance anyway. Mainwaring is measured for his uniform, but they do not have an officer's uniform to fit him. Instead, Wilson and Pike are chosen to be the officers. Mainwaring is annoyed, and at his request, is excused from appearing in the film by the Colonel.

The platoon are dressed as German soldiers for their parts. Pike is enjoying his turn as an officer, goosestepping around and acting like the German officers he has seen at the cinema. Mainwaring informs the platoon that they must stay inside Jones' van to avoid being spotted and creating an alarm.

Once they reach the film location, they are met by the producer who says that the filming has been postponed due to a problem with the lead actors, much to the platoon's disgust. Mainwaring halts outside the "Six Bells" public house to telephone Headquarters. Pike sees the pub and persuades Wilson that, now they are officers, they should all go for a drink. Thus the platoon converge upon the pub dressed as Nazis, much to the shock of the landlord, who tells his barmaid to warn the village.

Mainwaring discovers what has happened and orders the men outside, where they are met by an angry mob who accuse Mainwaring of being a quisling. The landlord telephones Walmington-on-Sea to tell the Home Guard that Nazis are heading their way. Unfortunately, the telephone is answered by Warden Hodges and the Vicar, who assume the landlord is drunk. After going outside and seeing the backs of the platoon, who are still dressed as Nazis and Mainwaring (whom Hodges declares a traitor) speaking to them, they decide to sound the alarm by ringing the church bells.

The platoon realise what is going on and they rush to the church to try and stop the bells, but the door is locked. Mainwaring tells Pike to phone GHQ and inform them it is not an invasion. They eventually enter after Wilson unbolts the door from the inside, and find a terrified Hodges, Vicar and Verger hanging from above by the bell ropes. Pike returns to inform Mainwaring that he had managed to stop the Coldstream Guards and a whole armoured division from coming. Laughing, Pike adds that the whole south coast was on red alert and the Brigadier himself wanted to know what "blithering idiot" was responsible. Pike tells Mainwaring that he has made him an appointment to see the Brigadier at 10:30 tomorrow.

== Cast ==
- Arthur Lowe as Captain Mainwaring
- John Le Mesurier as Sergeant Wilson
- Clive Dunn as Lance Corporal Jones
- John Laurie as Private Frazer
- Arnold Ridley as Private Godfrey
- Ian Lavender as Private Pike
- Bill Pertwee as ARP Warden Hodges
- Jack Haig as Mr Palethorpe, the Landlord
- Robert Raglan as The Colonel
- Felix Bowness as Special Constable
- John Bardon as Harold Forster
- Hilda Fenemore as Queenie Beal
- Janet Mahoney as Doris, the Barmaid
- Adele Strong as Lady with the Umbrella
- Colin Bean as Private Sponge

== Notes ==
1. The title is a reference to Duke Ellington's 1930 song of the same name.
2. BBC audience research at the time found that Ian Lavender had "surpassed himself" in his performance in a story giving him the "chance to display his versatility and comedy talent". Lavender has also said this was one of his favourite episodes.
