= The Royal Train =

- Dad's Army episode
- The Home Guard meet what they believe is the Royal Train.
- Episode no.: Series 6 Episode 3
- Directed by: David Croft
- Story by: Jimmy Perry and David Croft
- Original air date: 14 November 1973
- Running time: 29 minutes

Episode chronology
← Previous "My British Buddy"	Next → "We Know Our Onions"

"The Royal Train" is the third episode of the sixth series of the British comedy series Dad's Army. It was originally transmitted on 14 November 1973, the day of the wedding of Princess Anne and Mark Phillips.

== Synopsis ==
King George VI is set to pass through Walmington-on-Sea by train, and the platoon is to provide the guard of honour. A train duly arrives, but it is the wrong train, and its driver and fireman both fall asleep after drinking tea accidentally laced with Mrs Mainwaring's sleeping pills. Now the platoon must move the train to clear the line for the King's train.

== Plot ==
Jones is smartening up Wilson in the vicar's office, getting ready to go to the station for a special parade, at which Mainwaring will open some sealed orders. Mainwaring arrives, having been to the chemist to get some sleeping pills for Mrs Mainwaring; he says to Wilson that she is "a very nervous and highly strung woman". Jones relates how the only medicines they had in the Sudan were cascara and bicarbonate of soda; "good for making you run and belch, but little else". Pike arrives, insisting it is his turn to carry the Tommy gun, and accidentally knocks the sleeping tablets off the desk and onto the floor, breaking the bottle. Jones says the broken shards of glass could be fatal if Mrs Mainwaring ate them, but Mainwaring seems unconcerned. The tablets are put in a bottle labelled saccharine.

At the station, Frazer is making tea for the platoon, while Walker has supplied it and is charging 3d a cup. Pike asks Mainwaring if once he has read the secret orders, he is going to eat them, whereupon Jones volunteers to eat them.

Mainwaring goes into the kitchen and opens the secret orders, in the process leaving the saccharine bottle on the kitchen table. He comes out and gathers the platoon round him, then quietly reveals that King George VI will shortly be passing through the station in the Royal Train, which has been disguised. The platoon are to guard the station, and present arms as the train steams through. Mainwaring emphasises the secrecy, but then Hodges arrives, shouting "has the King arrived yet?!", ruining the secrecy. The platoon practise presenting arms, then the station master and ticket collector arrive, flustered, and rush to get properly dressed. The platoon practise some more, and the vicar, verger and mayor arrive, in their finery, having heard of the King's arrival.

A train whistle gets them all rushing out onto the platform, but it is a slow stopping train pulling only one coach and a small flatbed. The driver and fireman get off, holding a defective steam brake wheel, and go to the office to telephone the depot. Whilst there, they make a cup of tea each, and load it with pills from the saccharine bottle, mistaking it for sugar.

Mainwaring checks the train politely for the King or his Equerry, only to find the coach empty except for one man who is clearly not the King. The station master reappears and complains that this train is in the way, but the crew are now asleep in the kitchen, having consumed the sleeping tablets. Pike tells Mainwaring he can drive it, so whilst the station master is on the phone, the platoon climb into the cab and set off. They soon begin to enjoy themselves and love the ride. The station master rushes out after they have gone and discovers the verger clutching the defective brake wheel.

In the engine cab, Pike announces to Mainwaring that, because of the absence of the brake wheel, he is unable to stop the train, starting a panic among the men. Frazer spots the vicar, verger, Hodges and the mayor chasing them on a handcar. Mainwaring starts to make his way over the top of the train to retrieve the missing wheel that the verger is brandishing, and although Jones goes with Mainwaring, he is as usual a complete liability, and Mainwaring has to save him from falling off several times. Once they reach the back of the train, Hodges throws the wheel, and Mainwaring catches it, then he and Jones start to make their way back to the cab. Whilst they are on top of the train, Pike attempts to stop the engine by putting it into reverse, and they are nearly thrown off.

The train starts to return to the station and the others on the handcar have to work hard to keep ahead of the train. The station master changes the points to direct the car and train into a siding, and they all tumble out just as the real Royal Train is heard approaching. They have to parade just where they are by the line, which happens to be in front of a water trough, so the group gets soaked as the train passes.

== Cast ==
- Arthur Lowe as Captain Mainwaring
- John Le Mesurier as Sergeant Wilson
- Clive Dunn as Lance Corporal Jones
- John Laurie as Private Frazer
- James Beck as Private Walker
- Arnold Ridley as Private Godfrey
- Ian Lavender as Private Pike
- Bill Pertwee as ARP Warden Hodges
- Edward Sinclair as The Verger
- Frank Williams as The Vicar
- William Moore as The Station Master
- Freddie Earlle as Henry
- Ronnie Brody as Bob
- Fred McNaughton as The Mayor
- Sue Bishop as The Ticket Collector
- Bob Hornery as The City Gent

== Notes ==
1. Outdoor scenes featuring the train were filmed at the North Norfolk Railway, which runs between Sheringham and Holt in North Norfolk, while station scenes were filmed at Weybourne railway station. At the time of filming, both the railway and the station were undergoing restoration, preparatory to the reinstating of passenger services.
2. The stock footage of the royal train features a LNER Class A4 on a section of the East Coast Main Line near Burnmouth in the Scottish Borders. Cliff Cottage, which is located on the coastal road that leads to Burnmouth Harbour, may be viewed in the background.
3. The locomotive used for the local train was a Kitson 0-6-0 saddle tank "Colwyn", formerly of Stewarts & Lloyds in Corby. In 2012, the locomotive was based at the Northampton & Lamport Railway and under restoration by a local company.
4. The platoon inaccurately believe the King has arrived on a shabby-looking train, which turns out to be a local stopping train. In reality, for reasons of security, the royal family and leading politicians of the wartime era often travelled on undistinguished trains to detract attention, as mentioned by the platoon.
5. Water troughs were never used by the Southern Railway, which would have served Walmington-on-Sea.
