= My British Buddy =

- Dad's Army episode
- Episode no.: Series 6 Episode 2
- Directed by: David Croft
- Story by: Jimmy Perry and David Croft
- Original air date: 7 November 1973
- Running time: 30 minutes

Episode chronology
| ← Previous "The Deadly Attachment" | Next → "The Royal Train" |

"My British Buddy" is the second episode of the sixth series of the British television sitcom Dad's Army. It was originally aired on BBC1 on Wednesday 7 November 1973.

== Synopsis ==
Following Pearl Harbor, the Americans have joined the fight against Nazism, and the first small contingent of troops arrives in Walmington-on-Sea. The platoon must make them feel welcome. A photographer from the local paper is on hand to record the special relationship.

== Plot ==
The Walmington-on-Sea Home Guard unit has received news; as Captain Mainwaring puts it, the "long dark tunnel is now illuminated by a bright light shining for all to see". He is not, as Pike initially believes, referring to the blackout, but to the arrival of the Americans into the war (and "not before time", according to certain members of the platoon). A detachment of American troops will be arriving in Walmington-on-Sea within the week, and the Home Guard intend to treat them to a traditional British welcome. It is Jones who has the brilliant idea (arrived at following a characteristically long-winded anecdote about a spear-throwing contest during his military service in the Sudan) of treating their visitors to a darts match in the local pub, to which the platoon will bring their girlfriends.

All initially goes well with the meeting of the two nations. Mainwaring is surprised by the informality of the American Colonel Schultz (who greets the British officer with a cheery "Howdy partner, put it there!"), and the colonel is somewhat nonplussed both by Frazer's unique rendition of the Robert Burns poem "Scots Wha Hae" (with strategic updating and references to Hitler) and Jones' complicated explanation of where the term "limeys" originated, but everything seems to be fine, with a number of pleasing propaganda photos taken by a Welsh photographer, Mr. Cheeseman. It starts to go wrong when the American soldiers are told to make themselves feel at home – and thus immediately start flirting with the Home Guard's girlfriends, who all promptly forget about their boyfriends when faced with the attention of the handsome young Americans.

Matters are not helped by the ungracious American response to warm beer and the lack of Scotch due to war privations, and when Warden Hodges struts over and begins telling the Americans that their late entry into the First and Second World Wars is not greatly appreciated, it does not take long for a fight to break out.

Very soon, the news of the brawl between the British and the Americans is in all the newspapers. The next day, Mainwaring (having earned a black eye as the first person to get hit in the fight) is ordered by his superiors to make a formal apology to the Americans, and thus restore Anglo-American relations and offset any potential German propaganda value out of the fight. There also needs to be a photo, which will be taken by Cheeseman, of Mainwaring and Colonel Schultz shaking hands to confirm said restoration. Resentful at being made the scapegoat, Mainwaring intends to make a formal statement detailing how his platoon were not responsible for the violence; but when it turns out that every member of the platoon (even, surprisingly, Godfrey) was a more than willing participant in the fight, it soon becomes a moot gesture.

Mainwaring is surprised, however, by the arrival of Schultz who, having learned of the extent of British hardship during the war, and somewhat ashamed of his earlier ingratitude, has arrived to offer his apologies on behalf of his unit, and to give the men a gift of chocolate. This would seem to be repairing the friendly relations – until the Home Guard learn of a dance in the American mess to which their girlfriends are all invited.

Just as Cheeseman is about to take the apology photo, Jones unintentionally provokes the American colonel to violence once again and the photo, of Schultz giving Mainwaring yet another black eye, is taken.

== Cast ==
- Arthur Lowe as Captain Mainwaring
- John Le Mesurier as Sergeant Wilson
- Clive Dunn as Lance Corporal Jones
- John Laurie as Private Frazer
- James Beck as Private Walker
- Arnold Ridley as Private Godfrey
- Ian Lavender as Private Pike
- Bill Pertwee as ARP Warden Hodges
- Colin Bean as Private Sponge
- Talfryn Thomas as Mr Cheeseman
- Alan Tilvern as Colonel Schultz
- Edward Sinclair as The Verger
- Frank Williams as The Vicar
- Janet Davies as Mrs Pike
- Wendy Richard as Shirley
- Pamela Cundell as Mrs Fox
- Verne Morgan as Landlord
- Suzanne Kerchiss as Ivy Samways
- Robert Raglan as The Colonel
- Blain Fairman as US Sergeant

== Notes ==
1. The arrival of the American Army in Britain places this episode some time in 1942. Dialogue spoken by Walker at the beginning of the episode states that the war has been going for "two and a half years", suggesting that it is roughly March/April 1942. In reality the first American troops were stationed in Northern Ireland in January. Pike also mentions seeing In Which We Serve, yet this film was not released until 17 September 1942.
2. Hodges offends the American colonel by suggesting they have made an "improvement on last time", the United States having entered the last war "three years late" in 1917, whereas this time they are "only two and a half years late" (war having broken out in Europe in September 1939).
3. Alan Tilvern, who plays Colonel Schultz, also played Captain Rodriguez in the earlier Dad's Army episode "Battle School".
4. This episode was Talfryn Thomas' first appearance in Dad's Army.
5. Suzanne Kerchiss, who played Pike's companion Ivy Samways, was at the time married to Ian Lavender.
