= When You've Got to Go =

- Dad's Army episode
- Episode no.: Series 8 Episode 2
- Directed by: David Croft
- Story by: Jimmy Perry and David Croft
- Original air date: 12 September 1975
- Running time: 30 minutes

Episode chronology
← Previous "Ring Dem Bells"	Next → "Is There Honey Still for Tea?"

"When You've Got to Go" is the second episode of the eighth series of the British comedy series Dad's Army. It was first transmitted on Friday 12 September 1975.

== Synopsis ==
Private Pike passes his medical tests and gets a position in the Royal Air Force.

== Plot ==
Wilson and Mrs Pike are having tea, waiting for Frank to come home from his call-up medical. When Frank arrives home, his mother is unpleasantly surprised when he tells her that he has passed A1 (in spite of his chronically bad chest, his painful sinuses, his weak ankles and recently acquired nervous twitch), and has requested to be put in the RAF. At the evening's parade, Mainwaring and the platoon are deciding what to do to celebrate Pike's departure. They decide to have a dinner at the fish and chip restaurant.

Later on, Mainwaring is having a meeting with representatives of the blood donor service who ask him how many pints of blood he and the platoon will be able to donate. He originally says 50, but after learning that the Wardens have also promised 50, he then changes his mind and says 100. Mainwaring soon discovers he has bitten off more than he can chew, as all but two members of the platoon (Mainwaring himself and Pike) are ineligible to donate blood due to medical conditions or being overage. Hodges arrives to rub it in to Mainwaring, but is interrupted by Corporal Jones, who states that he has been down to the POW camp and gathered 80 Italian soldiers. Hodges states that he still wins because he reached his target, but Jones replies that he has not, as he has also brought down seventeen nuns. With Mainwaring, Pike and the vicar making donations as well, it brings the total for the platoon to 100 pints. Meanwhile, one of the doctors has discovered that Pike's blood type is so rare that it is only found in one person in 10,000.

Later, platoon members are sitting in the restaurant having the fish and chip dinner in honour of Pike. After Wilson says a few words, Pike says that he would like to tell them all a funny story. He mentions the results of the blood drive and how rare his blood type is, and that if he was wounded in the Air Force, they would not be able to provide him with a blood transfusion. Frazer remarks that "so far the story hasn't been highly comic". Then, Pike adds that because of his rare blood type, the RAF will not have him and so he is not leaving after all, and the reason he did not want to tell the platoon straight away is because he had never had a dinner in his honour before. Mainwaring responds with "You stupid boy!"

== Cast ==
- Arthur Lowe as Captain Mainwaring
- John Le Mesurier as Sergeant Wilson
- Clive Dunn as Lance Corporal Jones
- John Laurie as Private Frazer
- Arnold Ridley as Private Godfrey
- Ian Lavender as Private Pike
- Janet Davies as Mrs Pike
- Bill Pertwee as ARP Warden Hodges
- Frank Williams as The Vicar
- Edward Sinclair as The Verger
- Eric Longworth as Town Clerk
- Freddie Earlle as Italian Sergeant
- Tim Barrett as Doctor
- Colin Bean as Private Sponge
- Frankie Holmes as Fishfryer
