= The Rear Guard =

US television program

- Created by: Jimmy Perry; David Croft
- Written by: Jimmy Perry; David Croft; Arthur Julian
- Directed by: Hal Cooper
- Starring: Lou Jacobi; Cliff Norton; Eddie Foy Jr. John McCook; Dennis Kort; Arthur Peterson; Jim Connell; James McCallion
- Country of origin: United States
- Original language: English
- No. of episodes: 1 (Pilot)

Production
- Running time: 30 minutes

Original release
- Network: ABC
- Release: 10 August 1976

The Rear Guard is a 1976 pilot episode for an American adaptation of the British situation comedy Dad's Army.

The pilot was aired on Tuesday, 10 August 1976 by the American Broadcasting Company (ABC). However, it was not commissioned as a series. As it was considered a failure, the original tapes were wiped. However, copies of the show are in the possession of the show's director, Hal Cooper, and other producers that were associated with the show.

== Plot ==
Set in World War II, The Rear Guard followed a band of men in the American Civil Defense (c. 1942) who were part of an auxiliary force in the event of an invasion of the United States. The episode was an adaptation of "The Deadly Attachment", in which a German U-Boat crew are placed under the supervision of the platoon.

== Characters ==
As The Rear Guard was a remake of Dad's Army, it included many of the same characters under alternative names. Here is a list of the characters and their original counterparts:

- Captain Nick Rosatti (Captain Mainwaring) – played by Cliff Norton
- Sergeant Max Raskin (Sergeant Wilson) – played by Lou Jacobi
- Bert Wagner (Lance Corporal Jones) – played by Eddie Foy Jr.
- Don Crawford (Private Walker) – played by John McCook
- Bobby Henderson (Private Pike) – played by Dennis Kort

The characters of Privates Godfrey and Frazer were not included in the remake.
