= The Cricket Match =

The Cricket Match may refer to:

- The Cricket Match (novel), a 1924 novel by Hugh de Sélincourt
- "The Cricket Match", an episode of the radio series Dad's Army, a remake of the TV episode "The Test"

== See also ==
- Cricket, a bat-and-ball team sport
