= Room Service (British TV series) =

- DVD cover
- Genre: Comedy
- Created by: Jimmy Perry
- Directed by: Michael Mills
- Starring: Bryan Pringle; Peter Sallis
- Country of origin: United Kingdom
- Original language: English
- No. of series: 1
- No. of episodes: 7

Production
- Production company: Thames Television

Original release
- Network: ITV
- Release: 2 January – 13 February 1979

Room Service is a 1979 Thames Television comedy series written by Jimmy Perry without his usual writing partner David Croft. It and Perry's other work without Croft, High Street Blues (1989, co-written with Robin Carr) "remain contenders for the title of worst British sitcom". The cast included Penelope Nice, Bryan Pringle and Matthew Kelly.

== Episodes ==
No.	Directed by	Written by	Original release date
1	Michael Mills	Jimmy Perry	2 January 1979
2	Michael Mills	Jimmy Perry	9 January 1979
3	Michael Mills	Jimmy Perry	16 January 1979
4	Michael Mills	Jimmy Perry	23 January 1979
5	Michael Mills	Jimmy Perry	30 January 1979
6	Michael Mills	Jimmy Perry	6 February 1979
7	Michael Mills	Jimmy Perry	13 February 1979
