= The Test (Dad's Army) =

- Dad's Army episode
- Episode no.: Series 4 Episode 10
- Directed by: David Croft
- Story by: Jimmy Perry and David Croft
- Original air date: 27 November 1970
- Running time: 30 minutes

Episode chronology
← Previous "Mum's Army"	Next → "A. Wilson (Manager)?"

"The Test" is the tenth episode of the fourth series of the British comedy series Dad's Army. It was originally transmitted on Friday 27 November 1970.

== Synopsis ==
The platoon are challenged to a cricket match by the ARP Wardens – who have recruited a top-class bowler to their ranks.

== Plot ==
Mainwaring is holding a parade, and complains about the lack of attendance at last Sunday's church parade. Walker admits he was unable to participate because he was delivering some knicker elastic to a group of ATS girls. Mainwaring wonders why he could not have waited until after the parade, and Walker says that he could, but they could not. Mainwaring then moves on to commenting on the length of Pike and Wilson's hair, and suggest they get it cut as they "aren't violin players".

Mainwaring produces a letter given to him by Chief Warden Hodges, and announces that he has challenged them to a game of cricket. The platoon readily accept. Mainwaring announces he is an opening batsman, Wilson is the captain of the local cricket club, and Jones volunteers to keep wicket with a particularly long anecdote on an occasion when he stumped Ranjitsinhji. Walker tells Mainwaring he can lay his hand on a couple of reconditioned cricket balls, and in typically autocratic fashion, Mainwaring decides that he will captain the side.

The next evening, they get the nets out, and have a practice. Pike's bowling efforts are continually interrupted by Mainwaring, who is typically full of advice, although he is highly unsuccessful when he tries to demonstrate: his bowling is repeatedly hit, and after a long lecture on batting technique he is bowled by the first ball he faces from Pike. Godfrey reveals that he used to play cricket for the Civil Service Stores when he was younger. Jones arrive late, and when he bats, the ball ends up smashing a church window.

On Saturday, at the cricket changing rooms, Hodges is keen to introduce E.C. Egan (played by Fred Trueman), a world-class professional fast bowler, to Gerald, one of his ARP Wardens. He tells them that he will not tell Mainwaring until he bats. Hodges produces an ARP application form for Egan to sign, to make it legal. When Egan asks what to do if the siren goes off, Hodges replies: "Resign".

The platoon arrive, with Wilson wearing a yellow, blue and brown striped blazer, Frazer in his funeral attire, Godfrey in the Panama hat he wears for bowls, and Pike wearing his bank clothes. Mainwaring is shocked, and lends Pike his spare cricketing trousers.

Hodges reappears, and asks Mainwaring to toss the coin to see who is batting first, but Mainwaring insists on getting the umpires, the vicar and the verger, to do it. Mainwaring calls heads, but it is tails. Hodges puts the platoon into field.

Hodges and Gerald open the batting for the Wardens, and Mainwaring bowls the first over, insisting that Pike field close in at silly mid-off despite Hodges' threat that he will "get his head bashed in". They do not start well, with Jones continually knocking the stumps out, forcing the vicar to bang them in again and again. When Hodges finally gets a chance to hit the ball, he finds Mainwaring's bowling singularly unthreatening, his first two hits being a leg-side four and a straight six. After a horrendous wide, the Verger no-balls Mainwaring, deciding that his attempted googly is a chuck. When Mainwaring disputes this, the Verger books Mainwaring for "gross impertinence and sarcasm", and then threatens to send him off, as would happen in football. Hodges then sends a big hit towards Godfrey, who tries unsuccessfully to catch it, and loses it in the long grass. While the platoon are searching for it, Hodges and Gerald keep running. When Walker produces a second cricket ball and they rush back, Hodges and Gerald have taken 24 runs. However, the platoon manage to take four wickets, with Jones' efforts behind the wicket finally being rewarded when he takes a stumping off a flighted ball from Pike, prompting Jones' typical "Don't Panic"-style celebration.

Hodges declares with the Wardens 152 for 4 at tea, and the platoon now have three hours to make the 153 runs needed for victory. Mainwaring, who finds Hodges' declaration "very sporting", opens the batting with Wilson. Hodges, who is keeping wicket, is keen to see Egan in action, and repeatedly remarks that he is "going to enjoy this". As Mainwaring prepares to bat, Egan walks down to the far end of the field. Mainwaring is confused, until Hodges gleefully informs him that the ball comes flying out of his hand at 95 mph. Egan charges towards Mainwaring, and delivers a ball which causes Mainwaring to dive to the floor, much to Hodges' delight.

However, the delivery has pulled Egan's shoulder, and he retires hurt. The platoon now have a chance. Mainwaring does well, until the Verger gives him out LBW. Pike is bowled first ball due to his inattention, but Jones, Walker and Frazer all contribute (although Frazer apparently has no knowledge of the game). Meanwhile, Wilson holds the innings together, scoring 81 runs. Eventually, Godfrey is the only one left to bat, and they only need five more runs to win. Wilson is still in at the other end.

Frazer thinks that Godfrey will be out first ball. However, everyone is surprised when he hits it, and they start to run; Godfrey drops his bat, but with Wilson's help he retrieves it and makes it back to the crease. Godfrey hits his next ball, bowled by Hodges, over square leg, and Mainwaring is delighted to see that it is going to be a six, meaning that the platoon have won by one wicket. Hodges comments that he should never have declared. Mainwaring reminds him that they will be "ready for anything, whether it comes from the wardens or the Nazis". As they cheer the wardens, and Godfrey and Wilson, the siren goes, and the platoon take up their positions.

== Scores ==
The wardens declare on 152 for 4 wickets. The Home Guard then go on to make 156 for 9, thus winning the match by one wicket. From what is seen on screen it can be deduced that the platoon members scored the following runs:-

- Captain Mainwaring 17 (LBW)
- Sergeant Wilson 81 not out
- Private Pike 0 (Bowled)
- Lance Corporal Jones 18 (Bowled)
- Private Frazer 7
- Private Walker 12
- Unknown
- Unknown
- Private Sponge 1 (Bowled)
- Unknown (Bowled)
- Private Godfrey 8 not out

== Cast ==
- Arthur Lowe as Captain Mainwaring
- John Le Mesurier as Sergeant Wilson
- Clive Dunn as Lance Corporal Jones
- John Laurie as Private Frazer
- James Beck as Private Walker
- Arnold Ridley as Private Godfrey
- Ian Lavender as Private Pike
- Bill Pertwee as ARP Warden Hodges
- Edward Sinclair as The Verger
- Frank Williams as The Vicar
- Don Estelle as Gerald
- Fred Trueman as E.C. Egan
- Harold Bennett as Mr. Blewitt

== Notes ==
- The working title for this episode was "The Cricket Match". This title was later used for the radio adaptation.
- Fred Trueman, a former professional cricketer, appeared as E.C. Egan, who Hodges claims "he would have played for England if the war hadn't started".
