= Eric Longworth =

British actor (1918–2008)

Eric Longworth in character

Eric Groves Longworth (20 July 1918 – 20 August 2008) was a British actor. He appeared in the BBC comedy Dad's Army as Mr Gordon, the town clerk of Walmington-on-Sea.

== Early life and career ==
Longworth was born in Shaw and Crompton, Lancashire on 20 July 1918. He had decided from an early age to become an actor, but whilst at Rydal School in north Wales had his hopes dashed when his father died suddenly and he had to leave help support the family. He was 17 at the time. He enlisted in the army in 1939 at the outbreak of World War II. He joined the BEF in France and was evacuated from the Dunkirk beaches. Following retraining in Yorkshire he sailed for India where he was commissioned into the Indian Army rising to captain be for being demobbed in 1946 when he sailed home to England.

As a young man he had joined the Crompton Stage Society, a local amateur company, playing character parts. After being demobbed he decided to turn professional, joining the Oldham Coliseum Theatre, and staying with them for 11 years. He rose to become theatre manager at Oldham, and later became the manager of the old Guildford Theatre until 1963; at both theatres he continued to act, and occasionally direct, as well as managing. His first television appearance was in 1963, and he was usually cast as civil servants or retired colonels.

He appeared in a 1972 episode of Lollipop written by Jimmy Perry, after which he was chosen for the part of the Walmington-on-Sea Town Clerk on Dad's Army. During the Dad's Army stage show, Longworth understudied Arthur Lowe. He also made a few films, and spent time flying around the globe visiting family, mixed in with the occasional voice over work, and appearances for the Dad's Army Appreciation Society. He also appeared in another Jimmy Perry and David Croft sitcom Hi-de-Hi! as a head waiter. He was active in acting from 1963 to 1996.

Longworth had been a regular at Dad's Army events over the years. He made his final public appearance was at the Dad's Army 40th birthday celebrations at the Imperial War Museum in London shortly before his death.

== Death ==
Longworth died in Peterborough, Cambridgeshire, on 20 August 2008, aged 90. His funeral was held on 5 September 2008.

== Filmography ==
=== Film ===
- All Neat in Black Stockings (1968) - Businessman
- Perfect Friday (1970) - House of Lords messenger
- Ooh… You Are Awful (1972) - Passport booth customer (uncredited)
- No Sex Please, We're British (1973) - Man with lighter
- The Bawdy Adventures of Tom Jones (1976) - Man at ball (uncredited)

=== Television ===
- No Hiding Place (1963) - 1st businessman
- ITV Television Playhouse (1963) - Mr Pickwick
- Martin Chuzzlewit (1964) - Second card player
- United! (1966) - Gerald Compton - recurring character
- Boy Meets Girl (1967–69) - Policeman
- ITV Play of the Week (1967) - Shop assistant
- 'Turn-up for Tony' (1968, television film) - Foreman
- The First Lady (1968) - Earnshaw
- Coronation Street (1967–76) - Nat Lumley - recurring character
- Foreign Exchange (1970, television film) - Boreman
- Dad's Army (1972–77) - Town clerk - recurring character
- Die Katze von Kensington (1996, television film)
