= High Street Blues =

British television sitcom series

- Genre: Sitcom
- Created by: Robin Carr; Jimmy Perry
- Written by: Jimmy Perry
- Directed by: Robin Carr
- Starring: Phil McCall; Ron Pember; Elizabeth Stewart; Georgia Mitchell; Valerie Walsh; Chris Pitt; Victoria Hasted; Martin Turner; Johnny Shannon; Eve Bland; Shirley Dixon
- Theme music composer: Rod Argent; Peter Van Hooke
- Country of origin: United Kingdom
- Original language: English
- No. of series: 1
- No. of episodes: 6

Production
- Executive producer: Marcus Plantin
- Producer: Robin Carr
- Production locations: Waverley, Surrey, England
- Running time: 30 minutes
- Production company: LWT

Original release
- Network: ITV
- Release: 6 January – 10 February 1989

High Street Blues was a short-lived British television sitcom series produced by LWT for ITV from 6 January to 10 February 1989. It ran for six episodes, each 30 minutes long. The series starring Phil McCall, Ron Pember, Elizabeth Stewart, Georgia Mitchell, Valerie Walsh, Chris Pitt, Victoria Hasted, Martin Turner, Johnny Shannon, Eve Bland and Shirley Dixon.

== Cast ==
- Phil McCall as Charlie McFee
- Ron Pember as Chesney Black
- Elizabeth Stewart as Mavis Drinkwater
- Georgia Mitchell as Paula Franks
- Valerie Walsh as Ritta Franks
- Chris Pitt as Bob Farthing
- Victoria Hasted as Susan Drinkwater
- Martin Turner as Valentine
- Johnny Shannon as Sharpe
- Eve Bland as Sheila
- Shirley Dixon as managing director
