= Blitz and Pieces =

Military museum in Great Yarmouth, England

Coordinates: 52.6839°N 1.7129°E

- Location: Scratby, Great Yarmouth
- Type: Home Front and Dad's Army
- Owner: Darren Stride
- Website: http://www.blitzandpiecesuk.com/

Blitz and Pieces is a museum in Scratby in Great Yarmouth, England, owned and operated by Darren Stride. Based on the British Home Front during World War II and the BBC comedy Dad's Army, the museum is housed in a 1940s prefabricated building, a 1930s wooden military hut and a variety of large sheds. In 2014, the museum was a finalist in Channel 4's George Clarke's Amazing Spaces: Shed of the Year series. The museum is open to the public by appointment.

== Origins of the museum ==
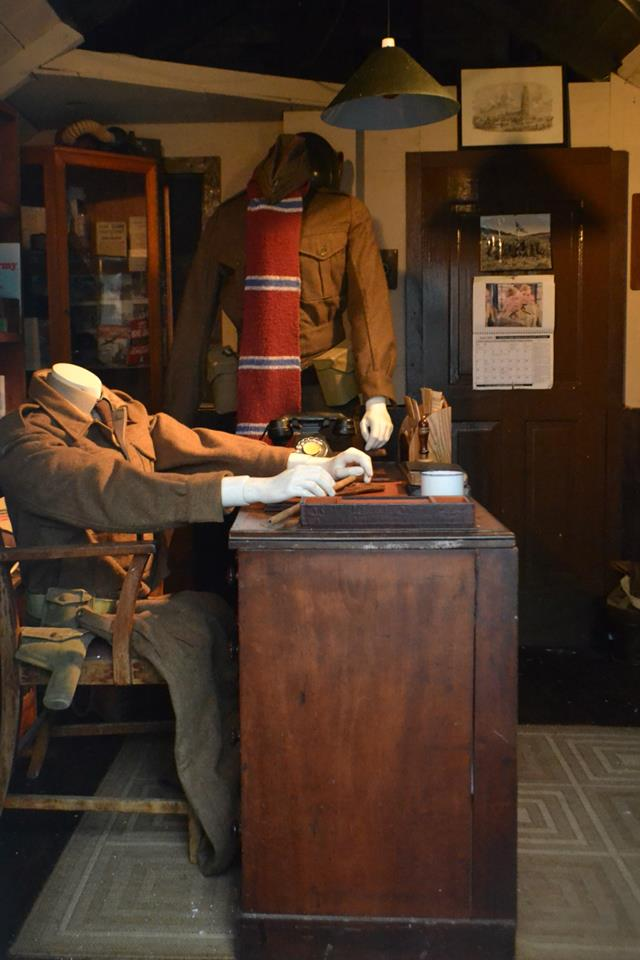
A section of Captain Mainwaring's office

Stride's interest in the 1940s began as a small boy when he watched repeats of the BBC comedy Dad's Army with his late grandfather, John Fenton, who had served as a private in the real Queen's Own Royal West Kent Regiment during World War II, the regiment that the Home Guard platoon in Dad's Army was based on. Before his death in 2001 he gave his grandson his service medals, which started the collection.

Many of the items in the collection were donated by members of the public or by visitors to the museum. The display in the period chemist's shop was acquired from the Yesterday's World attraction in Great Yarmouth following its closure in 2014.

== Blitz Street ==
The museum is housed along 'Blitz Street', and is based on the British Home Front during World War II; it features two period shops including a chemist's and a grocer's, a fully equipped 1940s kitchen and living room, an Anderson shelter complete with contents, a display of World War II uniforms, helmets and other artifacts, and a reconstruction of Captain Mainwaring's church hall office from Dad's Army.

Captain Mainwaring's office is housed in a 1930s beach hut requisitioned by the military during World War II and features several authentic Home Guard uniforms, a screen-used uniform and webbing from Dad's Army, a collection of Dad's Army memorabilia including original props such as half of the string used during filming of The Deadly Attachment. This was donated by David Croft; the other half is in the collection of Jimmy Perry.

In 2014, Blitz and Pieces was a finalist in Cuprinol's 'Shed of the Year' competition, broadcast by Channel 4.

== Gallery ==
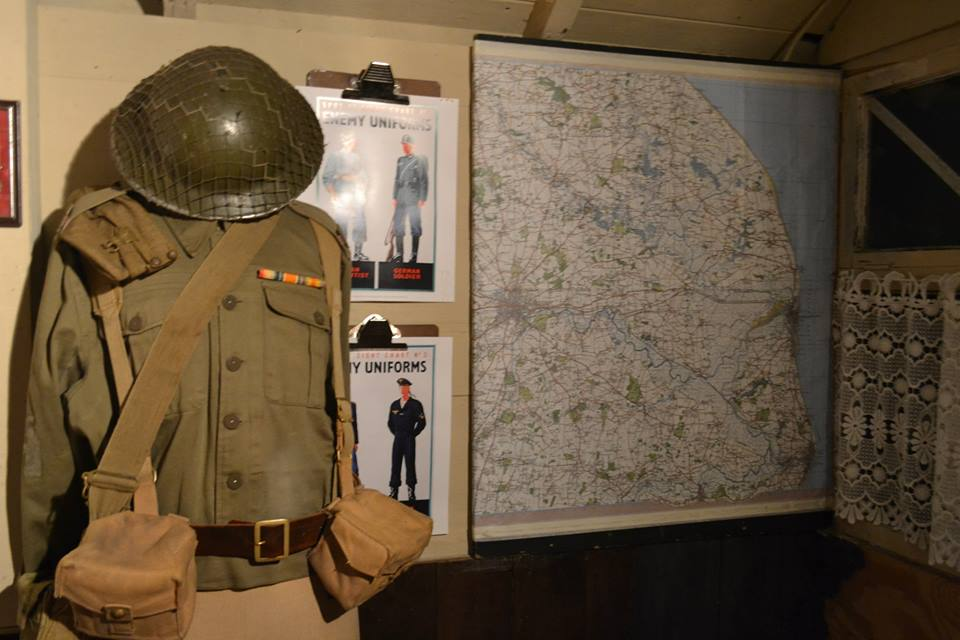
Corner of Captain Mainwaring's office

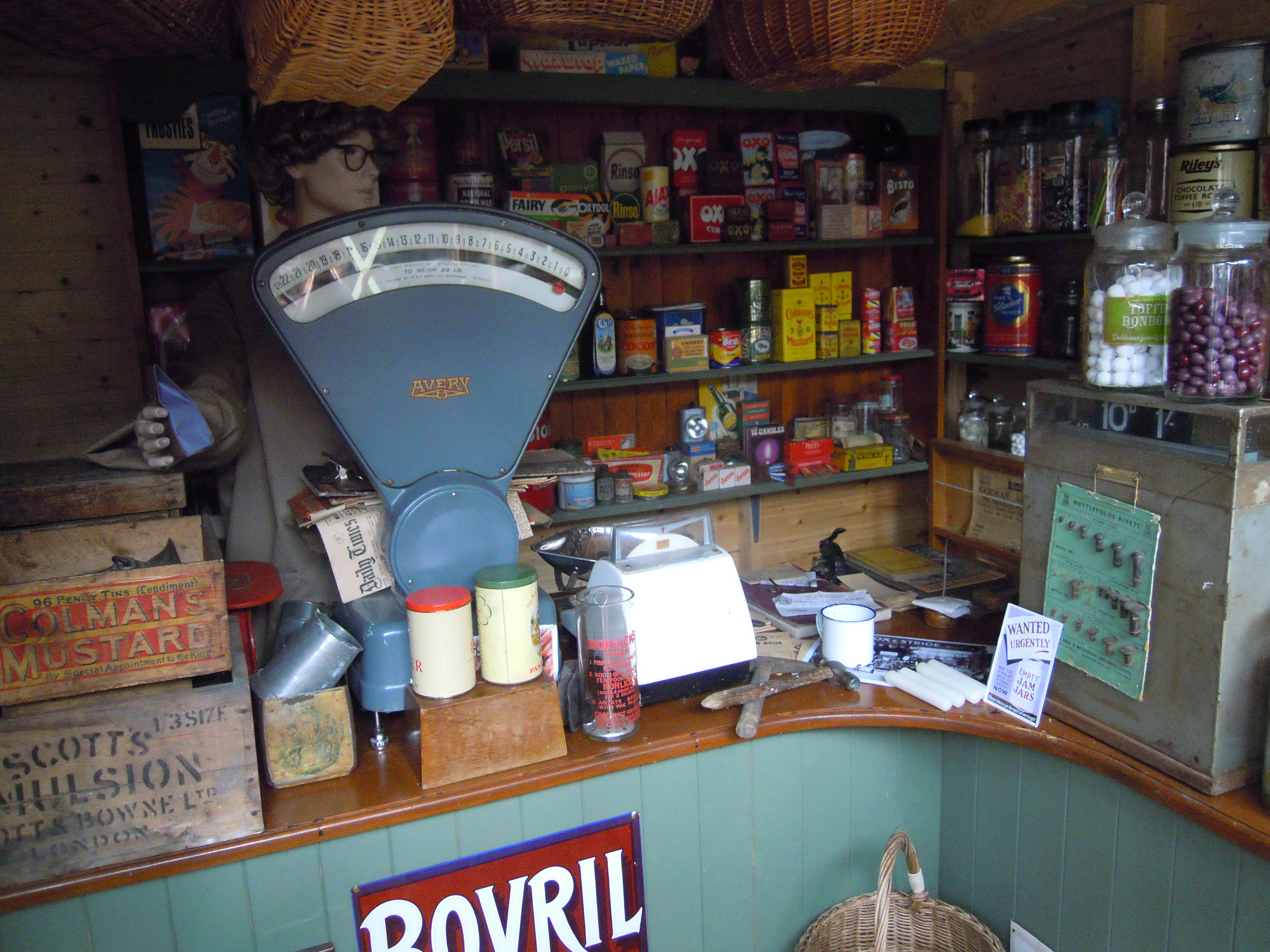
Corner of the grocer's shop

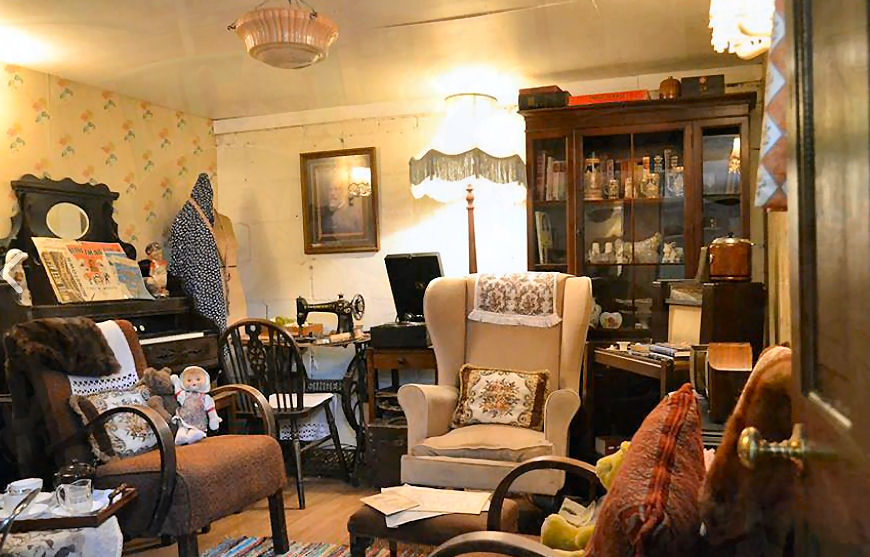
A view of the 1940s living room

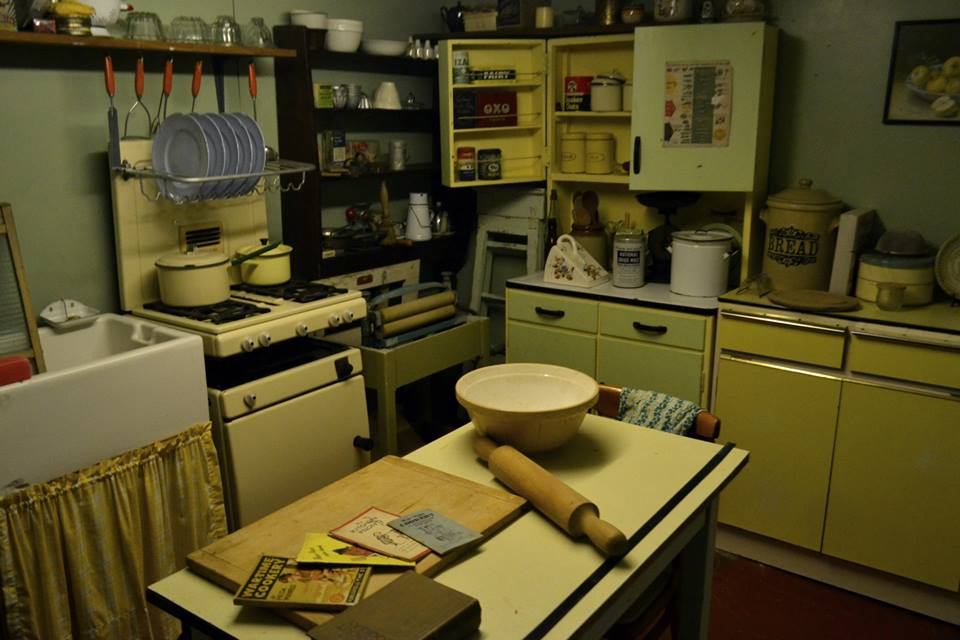
A view of the 1940s kitchen

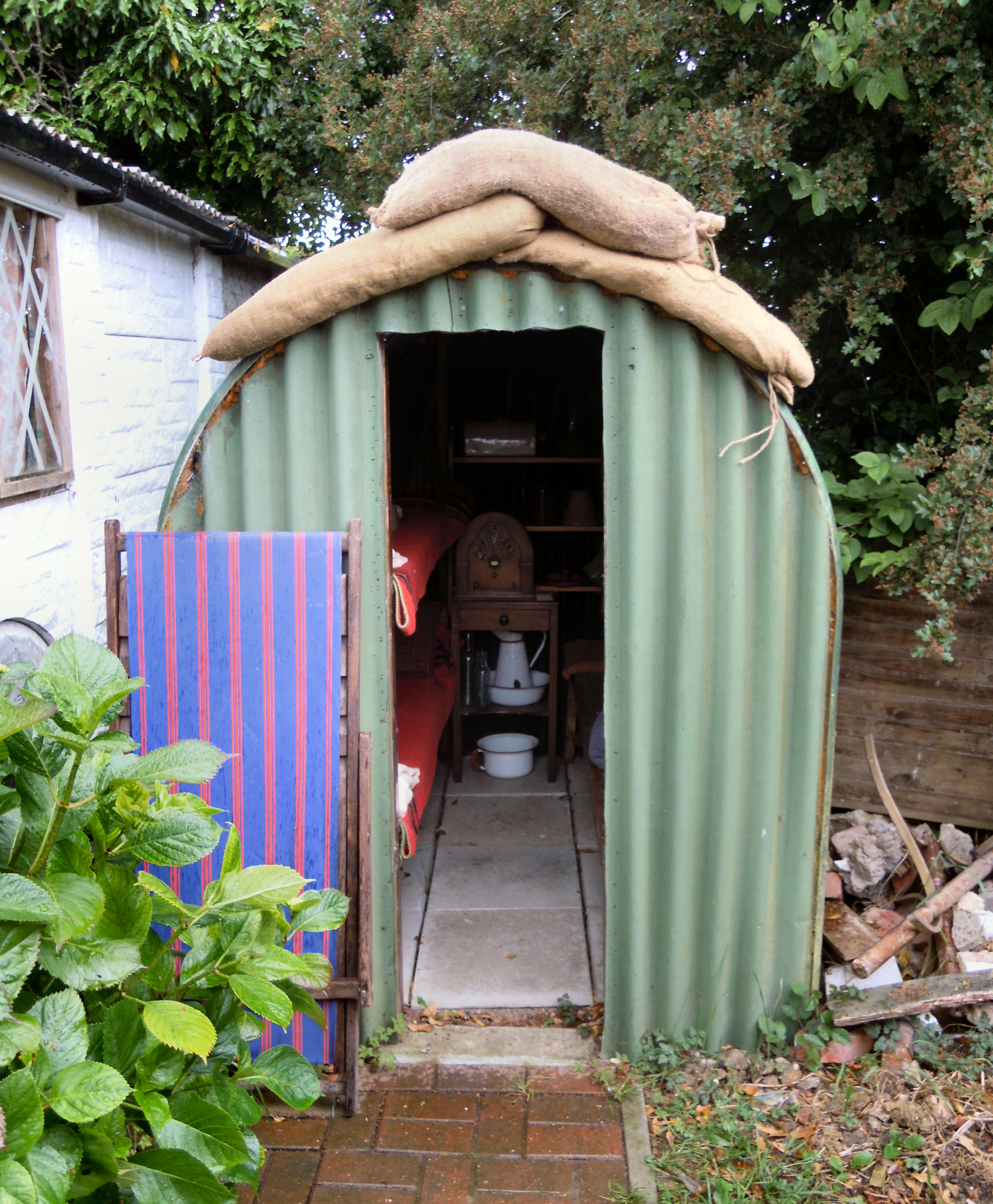
The Anderson shelter display
