= Ron Pember =

English actor (1934–2022)

- Born: Ronald Henry Pember; 11 April 1934; Plaistow, Essex, England
- Died: 8 March 2022 (aged 87)
- Occupations: Actor stage director dramatist
- Years active: 1950s–1992
- Spouse: Yvonne Tylee (m. 1959)

Ronald Henry Pember (11 April 1934 – 8 March 2022) was an English actor, stage director and dramatist. In a career stretching over thirty years, he was a character actor in British television productions in the 1970s and 1980s, usually in smaller parts or as a support playing a worldly-wise everyman.

Pember played the role of Alain Muny in the 1970s BBC drama series Secret Army. He also wrote Jack the Ripper (1974), a stage musical about the murder spree in London in the late 1880s, which is regularly produced by amateur theatre groups and companies around the world.

== Early life ==
Pember was born in Plaistow (at that time in the county of Essex) on 11 April 1934, the son of Gladys and William Pember. He received his formal education at Eastbrook Secondary Modern School, in Dagenham.

In the mid-1950s, he enlisted as an Aircraftman with the Royal Air Force as part of the United Kingdom's National Service military training system, being stationed in Egypt. In the late 1950s, he was a member of a Bexhill-on-Sea repertory company, The Penguin Players, which performed at the De La Warr Pavilion.

== Early career ==
His London stage debut was in the role of Harry in a production of Treasure Island at the Mermaid Theatre in 1959. He appeared in the musical Blitz! at the Adelphi Theatre in 1962.

In 1961, Pember made his television debut in a bit part as a wounded soldier in an episode of the series Looking About, entitled 'Florence Nightingale', subsequently appearing in the same year in the television play Looking for Frankie, and an episode of the police drama series Dixon of Dock Green. He appeared in cinema for the first time in an uncredited role in the film The Pumpkin Eater (1964), and appeared in a dramatized television adaptation of Pilgrim's Progress (1967) in several roles. He also appeared in the film Poor Cow (1967).

From 1964 to 1968, he acted in several roles with the National Theatre Company in London, departing its troupe in 1969 to direct a tour of a production of Treasure Island in New York City, and several cities in Canada. He appeared in a bit part as "Corporal at a Railway Station" in the film Oh, What a Lovely War (1969), and as a cobbler in the film Julius Caesar (1970).

In 1978, he played character roles in the radio series Share and Share Alike (radio series).

== Mermaid Theatre residency ==
From the late 1960s to the mid-1970s he worked at the Mermaid Theatre in London, where he acted in productions of the plays Bernard (1969), and the musical The Band Wagon (1969). Whilst at The Mermaid, he directed productions of the stage plays The Goblet Game (1968), Lock Up Your Daughters, Treasure Island (both 1969), Enter Solly Gold, Henry IV, Part 1 & Henry IV, Part 2, and the self-written, -directed and -produced Dick Turpin (all 1970); he also acted in the second and third of these. He played the role of Trinculo in a production of The Tempest (1970) at the theatre, and also directed King and Country (1976), and The Point! (and co-adapted, 1976).

He acted the role of Jaffee in an episode of the television Victorian crime series The Rivals of Sherlock Holmes (1971), and played Sgt. Mitchell in the television film Speaking of Murder (1971) in the same year. He also continued working in small parts in cinema, appearing as a lift operator in the horror-suspense film Death Line (1972). From 1973 to 1976, he regularly appeared in the Crown Court legal drama series cast as different characters, and was employed in bit parts in films, appearing in Young Winston (1972), as Jones in the fantasy-adventure film The Land That Time Forgot (1974), and in the character of Eliot in the First World War film Aces High (1976).

In 1974, he co-wrote and composed a theatre musical titled Jack the Ripper, based on the Whitechapel murders in London, which had a run in London's West End theatre. Its stage debut was at the Players' Theatre in Covent Garden in June 1974. It transferred to the Ambassadors Theatre in September 1974, and finished its run at the Cambridge Theatre in early 1975. The play was subsequently published by Samuel French, Ltd.

In 1974, Pember performed with the Royal Shakespeare Company at Stratford-upon-Avon in a production of Twelfth Night. He appeared in the play Liza of Lambeth at the Shaftesbury Theatre in 1976. In 1978, a play authored by Pember, 1800 and Froze to Death, was performed by the C.V.I. Theatre Company in Coventry (he directed the production), and later in that year he acted in a production of The Cherry Orchard at the Riverside Studio Theatre in Hammersmith.

From 1976 to 1984, Pember appeared in the television comedy series The Dick Emery Show and The Two Ronnies. In 1977, he appeared in a BBC television series dramatization of Nicholas Nickleby in the character of Mr. Sawley.

He ended the decade by playing the character of Makins in the Victorian murder-thriller cinema film Murder by Decree, about the Jack the Ripper killings (1979).

Pember played Belgian Resistance fighter and morse-code radio operator Alain Muny in the BBC's Second World War drama Secret Army, from 1977 to 1979.

== Later career ==
After the end of Secret Army, he appeared in the character of Poggio in a British television film of John Ford's 'Tis Pity She's A Whore (1980), and in the same year directed a British touring production of The Merchant of Venice.

In 1981, Pember rejoined the National Theatre. The Theatricalia website lists a total of 24 roles that he had played for the company at the Old Vic, Studio and South Bank by the time of his last in 1988.

In 1983, he appeared briefly in the role of Baz, the unenthusiastic Chairman of the Tenants' Association in the BBC sitcom Only Fools and Horses, in an episode titled "Homesick". He subsequently performed in a British television series dramatizing H.G. Wells' The Invisible Man (1984) as the character George Hall.

He continued to work in cinema, appearing in the role of Dobbs in the period-comedy pastiche film Bullshot (1983) and as a ferryman in Ordeal by Innocence (1985).

In 1985, he played the role of Seedle in the Doctor Who radio drama Slipback, alongside Valentine Dyall, and the next year appeared in an episode of the BBC Jersey based crime drama series Bergerac entitled Fires in the Fall. He also appeared with Maggie Ollerenshaw in the 1985 tragi-comic spoof documentary 'Swim The Channel' in Victoria Wood As Seen On TV as parents who forget they have any children.

In 1987 Pember began playing the role of Dennis Timson in the legal drama series Rumpole of the Bailey, which he continued with for the next five years until his retirement from acting. Along with working in Rumpole of the Bailey in the late 1980s and early 1990s, he ended his career working as a cast member in several television drama and comedy series: Red Dwarf (1988), High Street Blues (1989), Bluebirds (1989), and All Good Things (1991).

His final appearances were his role in Rumpole of the Bailey (1992), and as Joe Bilger in a BBC television drama series entitled Look at It This Way (1992).

== Personal life ==
Pember married Yvonne Tylee in 1959. He stopped acting after suffering a stroke in 1992, and retired to live in Southend-on-Sea. He died on 8 March 2022, at the age of 87.

== Filmography ==
- The Pumpkin Eater (1964) – Removal Man (uncredited)
- Poor Cow (1967) – Petal
- Subterfuge (1968) – Photographer
- Curse of the Crimson Altar (1968) – Petrol Attendant
- The Saint (1968, episode "The People Importers") – Sam
- Oh! What a Lovely War (1969) – Corporal at Railway Station
- Strange Report (1969) – Shop Manager
- Julius Caesar (1970) – Cobbler
- She'll Follow You Anywhere (1971) – Corporal
- Death Line (1972) – Lift Operator
- Young Winston (1972) – Fireman
- Adult Fun (1972) – Stockbroker Boss
- Armchair Cinema (1974, TV series) – Landlord
- The Land That Time Forgot (1974) – Jones
- The Naked Civil Servant (1975) – Black Cat Proprietor
- Aces High (1976) – Eliot, aircraft mechanic
- Rogue Male (1976, TV movie) – Ticket Collector at subway station
- The Glitterball (1977) – Filthy
- Murder by Decree (1979) – Makins
- Flambards (1979, TV series) – Drayman at brewery
- Rough Cut (1980) – Taxi Driver
- Minder (1980) – George
- Bullshot (1983) – Dobbs
- Ordeal by Innocence (1984) – Ferryman
- The Chain (1984) – Stan
- Footlight Frenzy (1984)
- Personal Services (1987) – Ron
- Red Dwarf (1988)
- Rumpole Of The Bailey (1978–1992) – Dennis Timson
