= The Deadly Attachment =

- Dad's Army episode
- Episode no.: Series 6 Episode 1
- Directed by: David Croft
- Story by: Jimmy Perry and David Croft
- Original air date: 31 October 1973
- Running time: 30 minutes

Episode chronology
← Previous "Time on My Hands"	Next → "My British Buddy"

"The Deadly Attachment" is the first episode of the sixth series of the British television sitcom Dad's Army. It was originally transmitted on Wednesday, October 31, 1973. It is arguably one of the best-known episodes of the series because of the comic aspects of a rare encounter between the platoon and the Germans. A scene in which a German officer demands to know Private Pike's name, and Captain Mainwaring says, "Don't tell him, Pike!" has been judged as one of the top three greatest comedy moments of British television.

== Plot ==
Captain Mainwaring is giving the platoon a lecture on identifying British and German parachutists. Mainwaring's lecture is interrupted by a telephone call from GHQ; the survivors of a sunken German U-boat have been picked up by a fishing boat and taken to Walmington-on-Sea. The Home Guard unit is to be responsible for providing security until the proper military escort can arrive. Mainwaring, excited at finally getting to grips with the enemy, sets off with most of the platoon to collect the prisoners, but not before ordering Sergeant Wilson and Private Pike to prime the platoon's allocation of hand grenades.

Pike is excited at handling grenades and pretending to be a gangster; Wilson is a lot more cautious, and he opts to prime the grenades with dummy detonators, reasoning that allowing certain members of the platoon to be in charge of live grenades could be very dangerous.

The prisoners, including their smug and surly captain, are held in the church hall until the escort arrives. However, Mainwaring receives another phone call from GHQ, saying the escort has been delayed and will not arrive until the following day, meaning the Home Guard will be responsible for the prisoners overnight. Mainwaring refers to Adolf Hitler as a tinpot dictator resembling Charlie Chaplin, annoying the captain, who starts to make a list of names of those he will seek out for retribution once the war ends. When Pike begins to sing a mocking song, the captain says that his name will also go on the list and asks what it is. Mainwaring says, "Don't tell him, Pike!", thus inadvertently revealing Pike's name.

The platoon settles down to guard the prisoners overnight. The Verger and Warden Hodges enter the hall after a night out drinking to find the prisoners waiting for them. Taking advantage of the distraction, the U-boat captain manages to steal Mainwaring's revolver, seizing Hodges as a hostage.

After a tense standoff between the Germans (housed in the vicar's office with their hostage) and the platoon (in the main hall with superior firepower), Mainwaring has an idea; he agrees to release the prisoners, confident that someone in the town will see them escaping. But the captain has anticipated this, and says the platoon will escort the prisoners through town and back to the harbour so as to avert suspicion, and will then accompany them back to France to ensure that the Royal Navy does not intervene. Cooperation will be further enforced by a grenade attached to a line of string in Jones's waistband, which the captain will activate at any hint of trouble.

The U-boat captain's plan is inadvertently thwarted by Mainwaring's senior officer, Colonel Pritchard, who chances upon the marching platoon en route to the harbour and, seeing the string in Jones' waistband, immediately pulls it. In the resulting chaos, Wilson calmly asks the Colonel for his gun, and uses it to recapture the Germans, forcing them up against the wall. Upon being told by Wilson that the grenades have been primed with false detonators, Mainwaring angrily asks why Wilson can never follow his orders, before realising that Wilson has saved Jones' life.

== Cast ==
- Arthur Lowe as Captain Mainwaring
- John Le Mesurier as Sergeant Wilson
- Clive Dunn as Lance-Corporal Jones
- John Laurie as Private Frazer
- James Beck as Private Walker
- Arnold Ridley as Private Godfrey
- Ian Lavender as Private Pike
- Philip Madoc as U-boat Captain
- Bill Pertwee as ARP Warden Hodges
- Edward Sinclair as The Verger
- Robert Raglan as The Colonel
- Colin Bean as Private Sponge

== Production ==
The grenade was initially scripted to be inserted into Mainwaring's trousers, but Arthur Lowe refused. "He said he'd have it inside his tunic," recalled co-writer David Croft in 2000, "but not down his trousers." As a result, Clive Dunn was chosen instead: "It was much better that way, of course, and I think Arthur was a little jealous."

== Notes ==
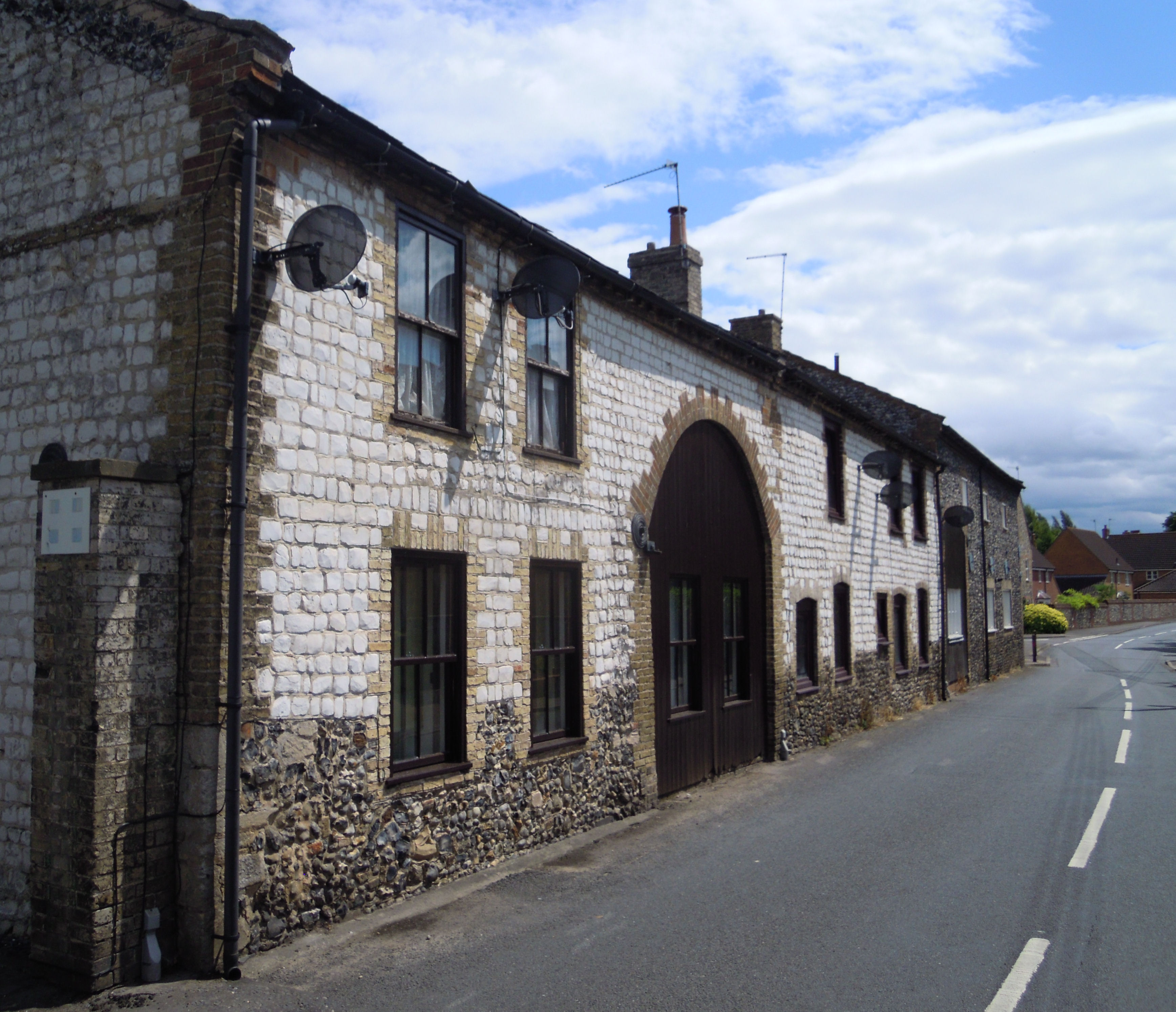
Mill Lane in Thetford was used for part of this episode's location filming.

1. Although the character only appeared in one episode, actor Philip Madoc's portrayal of the scheming U-boat captain is regularly recalled in the series. When Madoc died in 2012, BBC News broadcast a clip from this episode as part of their obituary.
2. Half of the length of string used during filming was in the collection of Jimmy Perry, while the other half is in the Blitz and Pieces museum near Great Yarmouth, having been donated by David Croft.
3. A song played in this episode was "All over the Place" by Jay Wilbur and his band and the Greene Sisters. The same song was previously used several times in Sons of the Sea.
4. This series marks the last 6 episode appearances of James Beck as Private Joe Walker, prior to his death that year.

== Adaptations ==
The episode was adapted for radio and a recreation of this episode formed the fourth instalment of the 2007 Dad's Army stage show. In 1976, the episode script was selected as the basis of an unsuccessful pilot episode for an American Broadcasting Company adaptation called The Rear Guard. The script also forms part of the combination of four shortened episodes published for amateur production.

The episode has been adapted on a number of occasions. Some changes were made when this episode was adapted for radio. In particular, it was the Vicar, not Hodges, who became the hostage. Additionally, the U-boat captain was given the name "Müller", while he remained unnamed in the TV adaption.
