= Phil McCall =

Scottish actor (1925–2002)

- Born: 26 November 1925; Glasgow, Scotland
- Died: 29 January 2002 (aged 76); Glasgow, Scotland
- Occupations: Stage, film and TV actor

Phil McCall (born Philip McColl; 26 November 1925 – 29 January 2002) was a Glaswegian actor who appeared in numerous plays, films and television productions over a 40-year period.

== Early life and education ==
McCall's father was a labourer. He attended St Mungo's Academy in Glasgow and trained as an actor at the Royal Scottish Academy of Music and Drama. He then appeared in repertory theatre in Scotland and England.

== Acting career ==
McCall had significant film roles in Ring of Bright Water (1969) and Lars von Trier's Breaking the Waves (1996). His television appearances included Dr. Finlay's Casebook, Bottle Boys, Monarch of the Glen, and Coronation Street. In addition to his role in films and television, McCall was the centrepoint in Knorr's stock cube advertising campaign in the 1980s, which included the famous catchphrase "Pea and ham soup from a chicken, now that's clever".

He appeared twice in episodes of the television series Minder, playing safe-breaker/sneak thief Scotch Harry.

He was the chairman of the Scottish committee of the actors' union Equity for 17 years.

== Theatre ==
Year	Title	Role	Company	Director	Notes
1982	Ane Satyre of the Thrie Estaites	Poor Man	Scottish Theatre Company	Tom Fleming	play by Sir David Lyndsay, adapted by Robert Kemp
1987	The Hypochondriak	Argan	Royal Lyceum Theatre Company, Edinburgh	John Matthews and Gerry Mulgrew	Hector MacMillan's Scots translation of Molière's Le Malade imaginaire
1990	The Ship	Rab	The Ship's Company, Govan	Bill Bryden	play by Bill Bryden staged at Harland and Wolff, Govan

== Death ==
McCall was married for 44 years to Katherine McCall, a television and theatre director. Their son also entered the entertainment industry, first as a child actor, then later became involved in the behind-the scenes theatre work.

His wife found him hanged at their home in Glasgow on 29 January 2002.
