= Dad's Army =

British TV sitcom (1968–1977)

- Series title card
- Genre: Sitcom; Historical fiction
- Created by: Jimmy Perry
- Written by: Jimmy Perry; David Croft
- Directed by: David Croft; Harold Snoad; Bob Spiers
- Starring: Arthur Lowe; John Le Mesurier; Clive Dunn; John Laurie; James Beck; Arnold Ridley; Ian Lavender
- Theme music composer: Jimmy Perry; Derek Taverner
- Opening theme: "Who Do You Think You Are Kidding, Mr Hitler?"
- Ending theme: "Who Do You Think You Are Kidding, Mr Hitler?" (instrumental)
- Country of origin: United Kingdom
- Original language: English
- No. of series: 9
- No. of episodes: 80 (3 missing) (list of episodes)

Production
- Producer: David Croft
- Camera setup: Multi-camera
- Running time: 30 minutes

Original release
- Network: BBC1
- Release: 31 July 1968 – 13 November 1977

Related
- It Sticks Out Half a Mile; Walking the Planks; High & Dry

Dad's Army is a British television sitcom about the United Kingdom's Home Guard during the Second World War. It was written by Jimmy Perry and David Croft, and originally broadcast on BBC1 from 31 July 1968 to 13 November 1977. It ran for nine series and 80 episodes in total; a feature film released in 1971, a stage show and a radio version based on the television scripts were also produced. The series regularly gained audiences of 18 million viewers and is still shown internationally.

The Home Guard consisted of local volunteers otherwise ineligible for military service, either because of age (hence the title Dad's Army), medical reasons, or by being in professions exempt from conscription. Most of the platoon members in Dad's Army are over military age and the series stars several older British actors, including Arnold Ridley, John Laurie, Arthur Lowe and John Le Mesurier, many of whom had served in the British Army during the Second World War in real life. Younger members of the cast included Ian Lavender, Clive Dunn (who, despite being one of the younger cast members, played the oldest guardsman, Lance Corporal Jones) and James Beck (who died suddenly during production of the sixth series in 1973). Other regular cast members included Frank Williams as the vicar, Edward Sinclair as the verger, and Bill Pertwee as the chief ARP warden. Following the death of Lavender in 2024, there are no surviving principal cast members.

The series has influenced British popular culture, with its catchphrases and characters being widely known. The Radio Times magazine listed Captain Mainwaring's "You stupid boy!" among the 25 greatest put-downs on TV. A 2001 Channel 4 poll ranked Captain Mainwaring 21st on its list of the 100 Greatest TV Characters. In 2004, Dad's Army came fourth in a BBC poll to find Britain's Best Sitcom. It was placed 13th in a list of the 100 Greatest British Television Programmes, drawn up by the British Film Institute in 2000, and voted for by industry professionals. A second feature film of Dad's Army with a different cast was released in 2016.

In 2019, UKTV recreated three missing episodes for broadcast in August that year on its Gold channel under the title Dad's Army: The Lost Episodes. It starred Kevin McNally and Robert Bathurst as Captain Mainwaring and Sergeant Wilson.

== Premise ==
The series is set in the fictional seaside town of Walmington-on-Sea, located on the south coast of England, not far from Eastbourne. The exterior scenes were mostly filmed in and around the Stanford Training Area (STANTA), near Thetford, Norfolk. Walmington, and its Home Guard platoon, would be on the frontline in the event of a German invasion across the English Channel. The first series has a loose narrative thread, with Captain Mainwaring's platoon being formed and equipped, initially with wooden guns and LDV armbands, later on with full army uniforms; the platoon is part of the Queen's Own Royal West Kent Regiment.

The first episode, "The Man and the Hour", begins with a scene set in the then-present day of 1968, in which Mainwaring addresses his old platoon as part of the contemporary '"I'm Backing Britain" campaign. The prologue opening was a condition imposed after initial concerns from Paul Fox, the BBC1 controller, that it belittled the efforts of the Home Guard. After Mainwaring relates how he had backed Britain in 1940, the episode proper begins; Dad's Army is thus told in flashback, although the final episode does not return to 1968. Later episodes are largely self-contained, albeit referring to previous events and with additional character development.

As the comedy in many ways relies upon the platoon's lack of participation in the Second World War, opposition to their activities must come from another quarter. This is generally provided by Chief Air Raid Precautions (ARP) Warden Hodges, and sometimes by the verger of the local church (St Aldhelm's) or by Captain Square and the neighbouring Eastgate Home Guard platoon. The group, however, does have some encounters related to the enemy, such as downed German planes, a Luftwaffe pilot who parachutes into the town's clock tower, a captured U-boat crew, and discarded parachutes that may have been German. A Viennese ornithologist appears in "Man Hunt" and an IRA suspect in "Absent Friends".

The humour ranges from the subtle (especially the class-reversed relationship between grammar school-educated Mainwaring, the local bank manager, and public school-educated Wilson, his deputy at the bank) to the slapstick (the antics of the elderly Jones being a prime example). Jones had several catchphrases, including "Don't panic!" (while panicking himself), "They don't like it up 'em!", "Permission to speak, sir?", "Handy-hock!" and his tales about the "Fuzzy-Wuzzies". Mainwaring's catchphrase to Pike is, "You stupid boy", which he uses in many episodes. Other cast members used catchphrases, including Sergeant Wilson, who regularly asked, "Do you think that's wise, sir?" when Captain Mainwaring made a suggestion.

The early series occasionally included darker humour, reflecting that, especially early in the war, the Home Guard was woefully under-equipped but was still willing to resist the Wehrmacht. For instance, in the episode "The Battle of Godfrey's Cottage", the platoon believes the enemy has invaded Britain. Mainwaring, Godfrey, Frazer and Jones (along with Godfrey's sisters, who are completely unaware of the invasion) decide to stay at the cottage to delay the German advance, buying the regular army time to arrive with reinforcements; "It'll probably be the end of us, but we're ready for that, aren't we, men?", says Mainwaring. "Of course.", replies Frazer.

== Characters ==
The characters of Dad's Army (left to right): Private Pike (Ian Lavender); ARP Warden Hodges (Bill Pertwee); Private Frazer (John Laurie); Private Godfrey (Arnold Ridley); Captain Mainwaring (Arthur Lowe); Private Walker (James Beck); Lance Corporal Jones (Clive Dunn); Sergeant Wilson (John Le Mesurier)

=== Main characters ===
- Captain George Mainwaring (/ˈmænərɪŋ/) (Arthur Lowe), the pompous, if essentially brave and unerringly patriotic, local bank manager. Mainwaring appointed himself leader of his town's contingent of Local Defence Volunteers. He had been a lieutenant in the First World War but is embarrassed by the fact that he never saw combat, only being sent to France in 1919 after the Armistice, as part of the Army of Occupation in Germany. The character, along with Wilson, also appeared in the original pilot episode of the radio series It Sticks Out Half a Mile.
- Sergeant Arthur Wilson (John Le Mesurier), a diffident, upper-middle-class chief bank clerk who often quietly questions Mainwaring's judgement ("Do you think that's wise, sir?"). Wilson had actually served as a captain during the First World War, but he only reveals this in the final episode. He does not live with the Pike family, but is implied to be in a relationship with the widowed Mrs Pike. Wilson also appears in the later radio series It Sticks Out Half a Mile.
- Lance Corporal Jack Jones (Clive Dunn), the local butcher, born in 1870. Jones is an old campaigner who enlisted as a drummer boy at the age of 14 and participated, as a boy soldier, in the Gordon Relief Expedition of 1884–85 and, as an adult, in Kitchener's campaign in the Sudan in 1896–98. Jones also served during the Boer War and the Great War. He often suffers from the effects of malaria caught during one of his campaigns and has to be calmed during his "shudders". Often seen as fastidious and a worrier, he has a number of catchphrases, including "They don't like it up 'em!" and "Don't panic, don't panic!", which he says whilst panicking. Dunn was considerably younger than his character, being only 48 when the series began. This meant he often performed the physical comedy of the show, which some of the older cast members were no longer capable of.
- Private James Frazer (John Laurie), a dour Scottish former chief petty officer on HMS Defiant in the Royal Navy. He served at the Battle of Jutland as a ship's cook and also has a medal for having served on Shackleton's Antarctic expedition. He grew up on the Isle of Barra and is prone to theatrical poetry. In episode one, he states that he owns a philately shop, but subsequently his profession is changed to an undertaker. His catchphrase is "We're doomed. Doomed!"
- Private Joe Walker (James Beck), a black market spiv, Walker is one of only two able-bodied men of military age among the main characters (the other being Private Pike). Possessing a cheeky and relaxed cockney demeanour, Walker is often shown making jokey comments at Mainwaring's expense, a habit the latter, when in earshot of the joke, chides him for but rarely takes offence at. In the first episode, Walker claims he was not called up to the regular army because he was in a reserved occupation as a wholesale supplier. In one of the missing episodes Walker is finally called up, but is subsequently medically discharged from the British Army during basic training, when it is discovered he has an allergy to corned beef. Although always on the lookout to make money, Walker is also seen to support local charities, including a children's home. Following James Beck's death in 1973, Walker was written out of the series.
- Private Charles Godfrey (Arnold Ridley), a retired shop assistant who had worked at the Army & Navy Stores in London. He lives in Walmington with his elderly sisters and serves as the platoon's medical orderly. He has a weak bladder and often needs to "be excused". A conscientious objector during the First World War, he was nevertheless awarded the Military Medal for heroic actions as a stretcher bearer in the Battle of the Somme. He also demonstrates bravery during his Home Guard service, particularly during the "Branded" episode in which Mainwaring, unconscious in a smoke-filled room, is rescued by Godfrey.
- Private Frank Pike (Ian Lavender), the youngest of the platoon. He is a cosseted, somewhat immature mother's boy, often wearing a thick scarf over his uniform to prevent illness, and is a frequent target for Mainwaring's derision ("You stupid boy!"). In series eight, Pike is finally called up to the RAF; however, during his physical examination, it is discovered that he has a very rare blood type (meaning that he might be in danger of dying if severely wounded and a blood transfusion is required), and he is subsequently excused from service for this reason. He works in his day job as an assistant bank clerk for Mainwaring. He frequently addresses Sergeant Wilson as "Uncle Arthur". However, on the last day of filming, David Croft confirmed to Lavender that Wilson was in fact Pike's father. Pike would later appear in the radio series It Sticks Out Half a Mile.

=== Supporting characters ===
- Chief ARP Warden William Hodges (Bill Pertwee), the platoon's major rival and nemesis. He calls Mainwaring "Napoleon". Mainwaring looks down on him as the local greengrocer and dislikes the fact that Hodges saw active service in the First World War. As an Air Raid Precautions (ARP) warden, Hodges is always demanding that people "Put that light out!". He often calls the platoon "Ruddy hooligans!". The character of Hodges would later appear in the radio series It Sticks Out Half a Mile.
- Reverend Timothy Farthing (Frank Williams), the effete, petulant vicar of St Aldhelm's Church. He reluctantly shares his church hall and office with the platoon. In several episodes of the series, it was implied that the character was a non-active closet homosexual.
- Maurice Yeatman (Edward Sinclair), the verger at St Aldhelm's Church and Scoutmaster of the local Sea Scout troop. He is often hostile to the platoon while frequently sycophantic towards the vicar. Despite this, the vicar often struggles to tolerate the verger and frequently employs the catchphrase "Oh do be quiet, Mr Yeatman!". He often sides with Hodges to undermine the platoon's activities.
- Mrs Mavis Pike (Janet Davies), Pike's overbearing widowed mother, who is often implied to be in a relationship with Sergeant Wilson. Liz Fraser replaced Janet Davies in the 1971 film version.
- Mrs Fox (Pamela Cundell), a glamorous widow. There is a mutual attraction with Corporal Jones and the couple marry in the last episode. Illicit little "extras" are passed across the counter on her regular visits to Jones's butcher's shop and she helps the platoon with official functions. In the episode "Mum's Army", she gives her first name as Marcia, but by the final episode she is addressed as Mildred.
- Colonel Pritchard (Robert Raglan), Captain Mainwaring's superior officer. A stern, serious man, he unexpectedly appears to admire Mainwaring, frequently commenting on his successes and warning people not to underestimate him.
- Private Sponge (Colin Bean), a sheep farmer. He leads the members of the platoon's second section (the first section being led by Corporal Jones) and thus had only occasional speaking parts, although he became more prominent in later series. He appeared in 76 of the 80 episodes.
- Mr Claude Gordon (Eric Longworth), the Walmington town clerk often involved when the platoon is taking part in local parades and displays. Although generally civil with Captain Mainwaring and his men, he is an officious and somewhat pompous individual, and Hodges tends to use him to try and interfere with the platoon's activities.
- Private Cheeseman (Talfryn Thomas), a Welshman who works for the town newspaper. He joined the Walmington-on-Sea platoon during the seventh series only after the sudden death of James Beck, who played Private Walker.
- Captain Square (Geoffrey Lumsden), the pompous commanding officer of the rival Eastgate platoon, and a former regular soldier who served with Lawrence of Arabia during the First World War. He is frequently at loggerheads with Mainwaring (whose name he persists in mispronouncing as spelt, "Main-wearing", instead of the correct "Mannering") and has the catchphrase "You blithering idiot!".
- Mrs Yeatman (Olive Mercer), the somewhat tyrannical wife of Maurice Yeatman, the verger. In his book The Complete A-Z of Dad's Army, entertainment journalist Richard Webber lists Mrs. Yeatman's first name as Anthea; however, Webber notes that over the course of the series, her first name is also given as Beryl, or Tracey, and that in early scripts, before any recording, she is referred to as Mrs. Harman.
- Mr Sidney Bluett (Harold Bennett), an elderly local man who is occasionally involved with the antics of both the platoon and Hodges. He and Mrs Yeatman are implied to be having an affair.
- Miss Janet King (Caroline Dowdeswell), a clerk at Swallow Bank who works with Mainwaring, Wilson, and Pike in the first series.
- Edith Parish (Wendy Richard), also called Shirley, a cinema usherette and girlfriend of Private Walker.
- Dolly (Amy Dalby and Joan Cooper) and Cissy Godfrey (Nan Braunton and Kathleen Saintsbury), Private Godfrey's spinster sisters, who reside with him at their cottage.
- Elizabeth Mainwaring (unseen character), George Mainwaring's reclusive, paranoid and domineering wife who is never seen onscreen in the TV series. (In the episode "A Soldier's Farewell" her "shape" is seen sleeping in the bunk above the captain while in their Anderson shelter.) Her marriage to George is not a happy one and he does his best to avoid her at any opportunity. They have no children. Mrs Mainwaring had a significant on-screen role in the 2016 film.

Other actors who appeared in small roles include Timothy Carlton, Don Estelle, Nigel Hawthorne, Geoffrey Hughes, Neville Hughes, Michael Knowles, John Ringham, Fulton Mackay, Jean Gilpin, Anthony Sagar, Anthony Sharp, Carmen Silvera, and Barbara Windsor.

Larry Martyn appeared as an unnamed private in four episodes, and later took over the part of Walker in the radio series following the death of James Beck. The former cricketer Fred Trueman appeared in "The Test".

== Episodes ==
The television programme lasted nine series and was broadcast over nine years, with 80 episodes in total, including three Christmas specials and an hour-long special. At its peak, the programme regularly gained audiences of 18.5 million. There were also four short specials broadcast as part of Christmas Night with the Stars in 1968, 1969, 1970 and 1972; one of which was also restaged as part of the Royal Variety Performance 1975.

=== Missing episodes ===
The first two series were recorded and screened in black-and-white, while series three to nine were recorded and screened in colour. Even so, one episode in series three, "Room at the Bottom", formerly survived only as a 16mm black-and-white film telerecording, made for overseas sales to countries not yet broadcasting in colour; and remains on the official DVD releases in this form. This episode has benefited from colour recovery technology, using a buried colour signal (chroma dots) in the black-and-white film print to restore the episode to colour and was transmitted on 13 December 2008 on BBC Two. The newly restored colour version of "Room at the Bottom" was eventually made commercially available in 2023, when it appeared as an extra on the DVD release Dad's Army: The Missing Episodes, with a specially filmed introduction by Ian Lavender.

Dad's Army was less affected than most from the wiping of videotape, but three second-series episodes remain missing: episode nine "The Loneliness of the Long Distance Walker", episode eleven "A Stripe for Frazer" and episode 12 "Under Fire". (All three missing episodes were among those remade for BBC Radio with most of the original cast, adapted from the original TV scripts. Audio recordings of all three were included as bonus features on The Complete Series DVD Collection.) Two further series two episodes, "Operation Kilt" and "The Battle of Godfrey's Cottage", were thought lost until 2001. Two of the three missing episodes have since been performed as part of the latest stage show.

In 2008, soundtracks of the missing episode "A Stripe for Frazer" and the 1968 Christmas Night with the Stars segment "Present Arms" were recovered. The soundtrack of "A Stripe for Frazer" has been mixed with animation to replace the missing images. The audio soundtrack for the "Cornish Floral Dance" sketch, from the 1970 episode of Christmas Night with the Stars, has also been recovered.

=== Dad's Army: The Lost Episodes (2019) ===
In 2018, UKTV announced plans to recreate the three missing episodes for broadcast on its Gold channel. Mercury Productions, the company responsible for Saluting Dad's Army, Gold's 50th anniversary tribute series, produced the episodes, which were directed by Ben Kellett. The recreations were broadcast in August 2019, coinciding with the 50th anniversary of their original broadcast by the BBC. Kevin McNally and Robert Bathurst were the initial casting announcements as Captain Mainwaring and Sergeant Wilson, with Bernard Cribbins portraying Private Godfrey. The full cast was announced in January 2019, with McNally, Bathurst and Cribbins joined by Kevin Eldon, Mathew Horne, David Hayman and Tom Rosenthal. However, Bernard Cribbins subsequently withdrew from the project, and was replaced as Godfrey by Timothy West.

==== "Lost Episodes" Cast ====
- Kevin McNally as Captain Mainwaring
- Robert Bathurst as Sergeant Wilson
- Kevin Eldon as Lance Corporal Jones
- David Hayman as Private Frazer
- Mathew Horne as Private Walker
- Timothy West as Private Godfrey
- Tom Rosenthal as Private Pike
- Tracy-Ann Oberman as Mrs Pike
- Simon Ludders as ARP Warden Hodges
- David Horovitch as Corporal-Colonel Square
- John Biggins as the Verger

== Production ==
=== Development ===
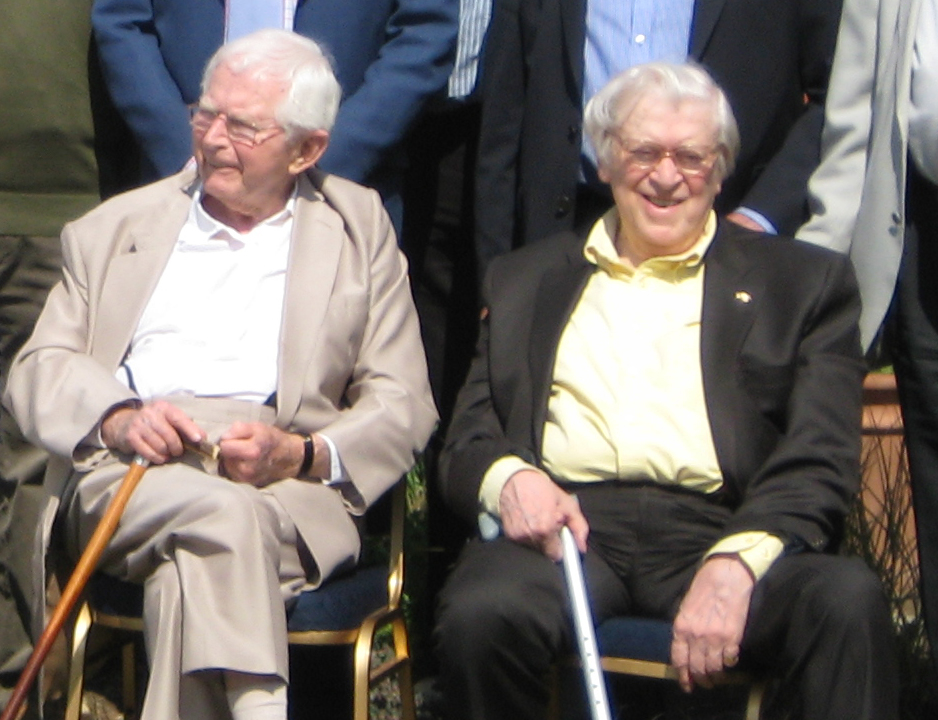
Co-writers David Croft and Jimmy Perry during a Dad's Army event at Bressingham Steam Museum, May 2011

Originally intended to be called The Fighting Tigers, Dad's Army was based partly on co-writer and creator Jimmy Perry's experiences in the Local Defence Volunteers (LDV, later known as the Home Guard) and highlighted a somewhat forgotten aspect of defence during the Second World War. Perry was only 16 when he joined the 10th Hertfordshire Battalion. He partly resembled the character of Private Pike, as his mother did not like him being out at night and continually feared he might catch a cold. An elderly lance corporal in the 10th Hertfordshire often referred to fighting under Kitchener against the "Fuzzy Wuzzies" (Hadendoa), and was the model for Lance Corporal Jones.

Other influences included the work of comedians such as Will Hay, whose film Oh, Mr Porter! featured a pompous ass, an old man and a young man; together, this gave Perry the ideas for Mainwaring, Godfrey and Pike. Film historian Jeffrey Richards has cited Lancastrian comedian Robb Wilton as a key influence; Wilton portrayed a work-shy husband who joined the Home Guard in numerous comic sketches during World War II.

Perry wrote the first script and sent it to David Croft while working as a minor actor in the Croft-produced sitcom Hugh and I, originally intending the role of the spiv, later called Walker, to be his own. Croft was impressed and sent the script to Michael Mills, the BBC's head of comedy, and the series was commissioned.

In his book Dad's Army: The Story of a Classic Television Show, Graham McCann explains that the show owes much to Michael Mills. It was he who renamed the show Dad's Army. He did not like Brightsea-on-Sea, so the location was changed to Walmington-on-Sea. He was happy with the names for the characters Mainwaring, Godfrey and Pike, but not with other names, and he made suggestions: Private Jim Duck became James Frazer, Joe Fish became Joe Walker and Jim Jones became Jack Jones. He also suggested adding a Scot. Jimmy Perry had produced the original idea, but needed a more experienced partner to see it through, so Mills suggested David Croft and this launched the beginning of their professional association.

When an episode was screened to members of the public to gauge audience reaction prior to broadcast of the first series, the majority of the audience thought it was very poor. The production team put the report containing the negative comments at the bottom of David Croft's in-tray. He only saw it several months later, after the series had been broadcast and received a positive response.

=== Music ===
The show's theme tune, "Who Do You Think You Are Kidding, Mr Hitler?", was Jimmy Perry's idea, written especially for the show and intended as a gentle pastiche of wartime songs. The other songs were authentic 1940s music recordings. Perry wrote the lyrics and composed the music with Derek Taverner. Perry persuaded one of his childhood idols, wartime entertainer Bud Flanagan, to sing the theme for 100 guineas (equivalent to £1,700 in 2025). Flanagan died less than a year after the recording. At the time it was widely believed to be a wartime song. The music over the opening credits was recorded at Riverside Studios, Flanagan being accompanied by the Orchestra of the Band of the Coldstream Guards.

The version played over the opening credits differs slightly from the full version recorded by Flanagan; an edit removes, for timing reasons, two lines of lyric with the "middle eight" tune: "So watch out Mr Hitler, you have met your match in us/If you think you can crush us, we're afraid you've missed the bus." (The latter lyric is a reference to a speech by Neville Chamberlain.) Bud Flanagan's full version appears as an Easter egg on the first series DVD release and on the authorised soundtrack CD issued by CD41. Arthur Lowe also recorded a full version of the theme.

The closing credits feature an instrumental march version of the song played by the Band of the Coldstream Guards conducted by Captain (later Lieutenant Colonel) Trevor L. Sharpe, ending with the air-raid warning siren sounding all-clear. It is accompanied by a style of credits that became a trademark of David Croft: the caption "You have been watching", followed by vignettes of the main cast.

The series also contains genuine wartime and period songs between scenes, usually brief quotations that have some reference to the theme of the episode or the scene. Many appear on the CD soundtrack issued by CD41, being the same versions used in the series

=== Opening and closing credits ===
The show's opening titles were originally intended to feature footage of refugees and Nazi troops, to illustrate the threat faced by the Home Guard. Despite opposition from the BBC's head of comedy Michael Mills, Paul Fox, the controller of BBC1, ordered that these be removed on the grounds that they were offensive. The replacement titles featured the animated sequence of swastika-headed arrows approaching Britain. Originally in black and white, the opening titles were updated twice; firstly in series three, adding colour and improved animation, and once again in series six, which made further improvements to the animation.

There were two different versions of the closing credits used in the show. The first version, used in series one and two, simply showed footage of the main cast superimposed over a still photograph, with the crew credits rolling over a black background. The better-known closing credits, introduced in series three, were a homage to the end credits of The Way Ahead (1944), a film which had covered the training of a platoon during the Second World War. In both instances, each character is shown as they walk across a smoke-filled battlefield. One of the actors in Dad's Army, John Laurie, also appeared in that film, and his performance in the end credits of The Way Ahead appears to be copied in the sitcom. Coincidentally, the film's lead character (played by David Niven) is named Lieutenant Jim Perry. Following this sequence, the end credits roll, and the platoon is shown in a wide angle shot as they run towards the camera, while bombs explode behind them. As the credits come to an end, the platoon run past the camera and the all clear siren rings, before the screen fades to black.

== Adaptations and other appearances ==
=== 1971 film ===
In common with many British sitcoms of that era, Dad's Army was spun-off as a feature film which was released in 1971. Backers Columbia Pictures imposed arbitrary changes, such as recasting Liz Fraser as Mavis Pike and filming locations in Chalfont St Giles, Buckinghamshire, rather than Thetford in Norfolk, which made the cast unhappy. The director, Norman Cohen, whose idea it was to make the film, was nearly sacked by the studio.

Jimmy Perry and David Croft wrote the original screenplay. This was expanded by Cohen to try to make it more cinematic; Columbia executives made more changes to plot and pacing. As finally realised, two-thirds of the film consists of the creation of the platoon; this was the contribution of Perry and Croft, and differs in a number of ways from the formation of the platoon as seen in the first series of the television version. The final third shows the platoon in action, rescuing hostages from the church hall where they had been held captive by the crewmen of a downed German aircraft.

Neither the cast nor Perry and Croft were happy with the result. Perry argued for changes to try to reproduce the style of the television series, but with mixed results.

Filming took place from 10 August to 25 September 1970 at Shepperton Studios and on location. After shooting the film, the cast returned to working on the fourth television series.

The film's UK première was on 12 March 1971 at the Columbia Theatre, London. Critical reviews were mixed, but it performed well at the UK box-office. Discussions were held about a possible sequel, to be called Dad's Army and the Secret U-Boat Base, but the project never came to fruition.

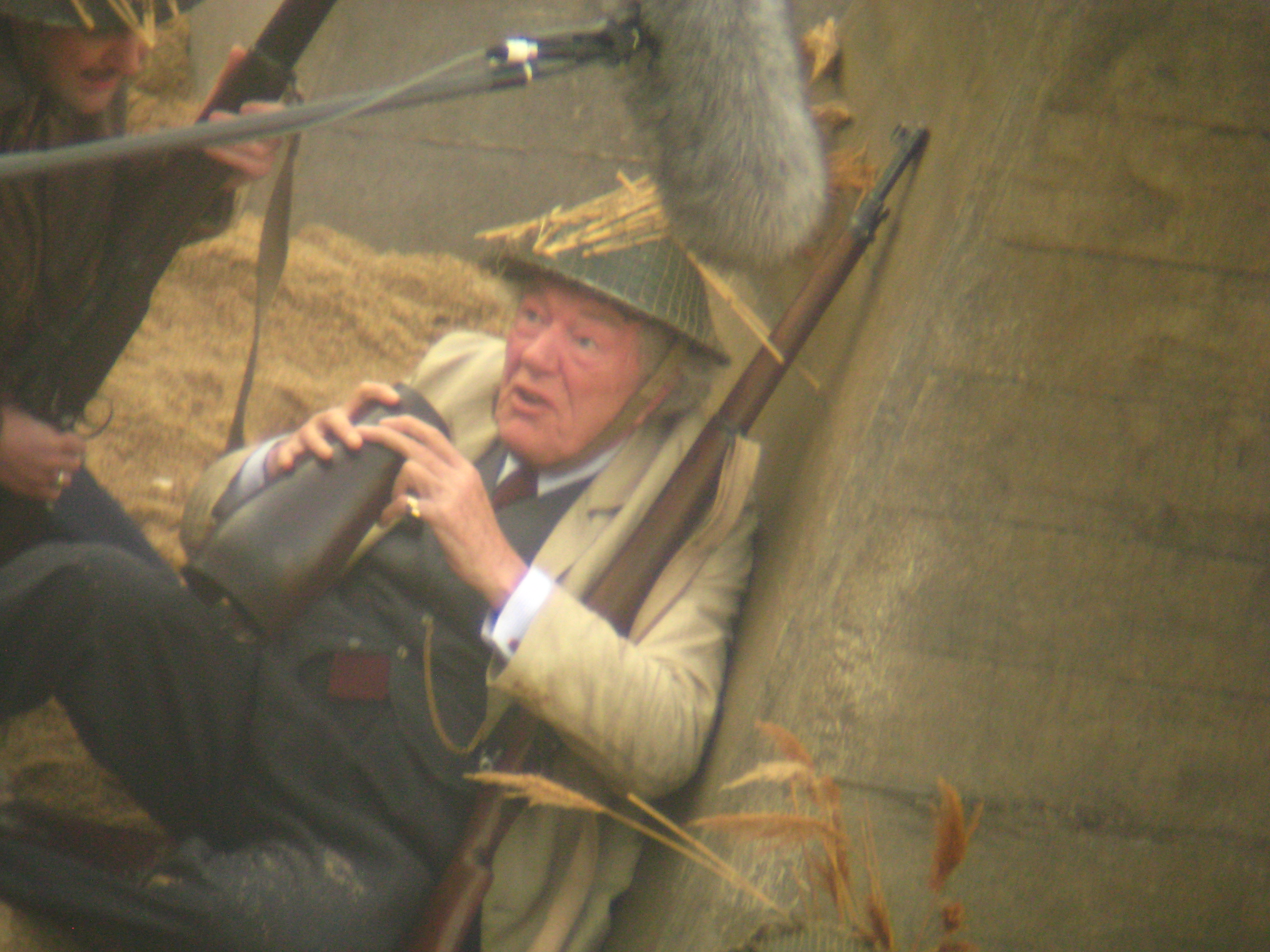
Michael Gambon as Private Godfrey (2014)

=== 2016 film ===
A second film, written by Hamish McColl and directed by Oliver Parker, was released in 2016. The cast included Toby Jones as Captain Mainwaring, Bill Nighy as Sergeant Wilson, Tom Courtenay as Lance Corporal Jones, Michael Gambon as Private Godfrey, Blake Harrison as Private Pike, Daniel Mays as Private Walker and Bill Paterson as Private Frazer. Catherine Zeta-Jones, Sarah Lancashire and Mark Gatiss also featured. The film was primarily shot on location in Yorkshire. Filming took place on the beach at North Landing, Flamborough Head, Yorkshire and at nearby Bridlington. It opened in February 2016 to mainly negative reviews.

=== Stage show ===
A poster advertising the stage show

In 1975, Dad's Army transferred to the stage as a revue, with songs, familiar scenes from the show and individual "turns" for cast members. It was directed by Roger Redfarn, who shared the same agent as the series' writers. Most of the principal cast transferred with it, with the exception of John Laurie, who was replaced by Hamish Roughead. Following James Beck's death two years earlier, Walker was played by John Bardon.

Dad's Army: A Nostalgic Music and Laughter Show of Britain's Finest Hour opened at Billingham in Teesside on 4 September 1975 for a two-week tryout. After cuts and revisions, the show transferred to London's West End and opened at the Shaftesbury Theatre on 2 October 1975. On the opening night there was a surprise appearance by Chesney Allen, singing the old Flanagan and Allen song Hometown with Arthur Lowe.

The show ran in the West End until 21 February 1976, disrupted twice by bomb scares and then toured the country until 4 September 1976. Clive Dunn was replaced for half the tour by Jack Haig (David Croft's original first choice for the role of Lance Corporal Jones on television). Jeffrey Holland, who went on to star in several later Croft sitcoms, also had a number of roles in the production.

The stage show, billed as Dad's Army—The Musical, was staged in Australia and toured New Zealand in 2004–2005, starring Jon English. Several sections of this stage show were filmed and have subsequently been included as extras on the final Dad's Army DVD.

In April 2007, a new stage show was announced with cast members including Leslie Grantham as Private Walker and Emmerdale actor Peter Martin as Captain Mainwaring. The production contained the episodes "A Stripe for Frazer", "The Loneliness of the Long Distance Walker", "Room at the Bottom" and "The Deadly Attachment".

In August 2017, a new two-man stage show titled, Dad's Army Radio Hour, opened at the Edinburgh Festival Fringe It starred David Benson and Jack Lane. Between them, the pair voiced the entire cast of Dad's Army, including incidental characters. The episodes adapted from the original radio scripts were "The Deadly Attachment", "The Day the Balloon Went Up", "Brain Versus Brawn", "My British Buddy", "Round and Round Went the Great Big Wheel" and "Mum's Army". The production featured three episodes not adapted for the radio series "When You've Got to Go", "My Brother and I" and "Never Too Old". The show was well received by critics and the David Croft estate for its respectful and uncanny performances. In 2019, the production changed its name to Dad's Army Radio Show and continued to tour nationally throughout the UK until the end of 2021.

=== Radio series ===
The majority of the television scripts were adapted for BBC Radio 4 with the original cast, although other actors played Walker after James Beck's death (which took place soon after recording and before transmission of the first radio series). Harold Snoad and Michael Knowles were responsible for the adaptation, while wartime BBC announcer John Snagge set the scene for each episode. Different actors were used for some of the minor parts: for example Mollie Sugden played the role of Mrs Fox, and Pearl Hackney played Mrs Pike. The first episode was based on the revised version of events seen in the opening of the film version, rather than on the television pilot. The series ran for three series and 67 episodes from 1974–76. The entire radio series has been released on CD.

Knowles and Snoad developed a radio series, It Sticks Out Half a Mile, which followed Sergeant Wilson, Private Pike and Warden Hodges's attempts to renovate a pier in the fictional town of Frambourne-on-Sea following the end of the war. It was originally intended to star Arthur Lowe and John Le Mesurier, but Lowe died after recording the pilot episode in 1981. In consequence, Bill Pertwee and Ian Lavender were brought in to replace him. In the event the revised cast recorded a 13-episode series. John Le Mesurier died in November 1983, making another series impossible.

The last radio recording of Dad's Army occurred in 1995, when Jimmy Perry wrote a radio sketch entitled The Boy Who Saved England for the "Full Steam A-Hudd" evening broadcast on BBC Radio 2, transmitted on 3 June 1995 on the occasion of the closure of the BBC's Paris studios in Lower Regent Street. It featured Ian Lavender as Pike, Bill Pertwee as Hodges, Frank Williams as the Vicar and Jimmy Perry as General Haverlock-Seabag.

=== American adaptation ===
A pilot episode for an American remake called The Rear Guard, adapted for American viewers by Arthur Julian, was produced by the ABC and broadcast on 10 August 1976, based on the Dad's Army episode "The Deadly Attachment". Set in Long Island, the pilot starred Cliff Norton as Captain Rosatti, Lou Jacobi as Sergeant Raskin and Eddie Foy Jr. as Lance Corporal Wagner. The pilot was considered a failure, so the original tapes were wiped. However, director Hal Cooper kept a copy of the pilot, which was returned to several collectors in 1998. Though further storylines were planned, the series failed to make it past the pilot stage.

=== Other appearances ===
Lowe, Le Mesurier, Laurie, Beck, Ridley and Lavender (wearing Pike's signature scarf) appeared as guests in the 22 April 1971 edition of The Morecambe & Wise Show on BBC2 in the "Monty on the Bonty" sketch, with Lowe as Captain Bligh and the others as crewmen on HMS Bounty. Lowe, Le Mesurier and Laurie again made a cameo appearance as their Dad's Army characters in the 1977 Morecambe & Wise Christmas Special. While Elton John is following incomprehensible instructions to find the BBC studios, he encounters them in a steam room. On leaving, Mainwaring calls him a "stupid boy".

Arthur Lowe twice appeared on the BBC children's programme Blue Peter. The first time, in 1973, was with John Le Mesurier, in which the two appeared in costume and in character as Captain Mainwaring and Sergeant Wilson. Together they viewed and discussed a mural painted by schoolchildren, featuring the characters from the show at a Christmas party, among whom was Mainwaring's unseen wife Elizabeth – or rather, what the children thought she looked like (Mainwaring remarks "Good grief. What a remarkable likeness!"). Arthur Lowe made a second appearance as Captain Mainwaring on Blue Peter with the Dad's Army van, which would appear in the forthcoming London-Brighton run, and showed presenter John Noakes the vehicle's hidden anti-Nazi defences. Later that year, Lowe, Le Mesurier, Dunn, Lavender and Pertwee, along with Jones's van, appeared in character at the finish of the 1974 London to Brighton Veteran Car Run.

The cast appeared in a 1974 public information film, in character but set in the modern day, in which the platoon demonstrated how to cross the road safely at Pelican crossings. Lowe and Le Mesurier made a final appearance as their Dad's Army characters for a 1982 television commercial advertising Wispa chocolate bars. Clive Dunn made occasional appearances as Lance Corporal Jones at 1940s themed events in the 1980s and 1990s and on television on the BBC Saturday night entertainment show Noel's House Party on 27 November 1993.

== Reception ==
=== Awards ===
During its original television run, Dad's Army was nominated for multiple British Academy Television Awards, although only won "Best Light Entertainment Programme" in 1971. It was nominated as "Best Situation Comedy" in 1973, 1974 and 1975. In addition, Arthur Lowe was frequently nominated for "Best Light Entertainment Performance" in 1970, 1971, 1973, 1975 and 1978.

In 2000, the show was voted 13th in a British Film Institute poll of industry professionals of the 100 Greatest British Television Programmes. In 2004, championed by Phill Jupitus, it came fourth in the BBC poll to find Britain's Best Sitcom with 174,138 votes.

=== Legacy ===
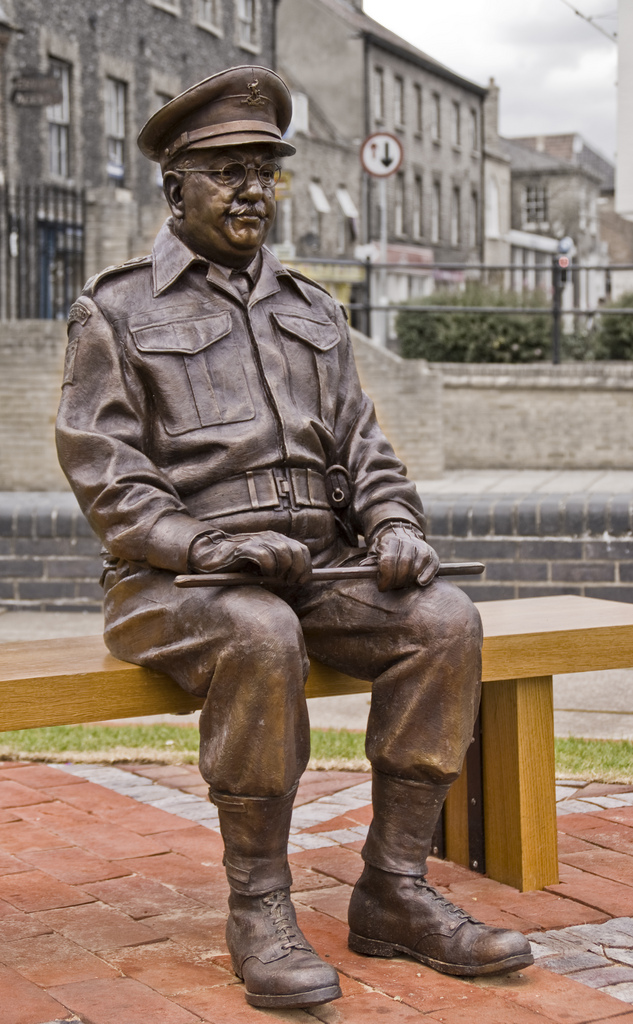
Statue of Captain Mainwaring, erected in Thetford in June 2010

In June 2010, a statue of Captain Mainwaring was erected in the Norfolk town of Thetford where most of the exteriors for the TV series were filmed. The statue features Captain Mainwaring sitting to attention on a simple bench in Home Guard uniform, with his swagger stick across his knees. The statue is mounted at the end of a winding brick pathway with a Union Flag patterned arrowhead to reflect the opening credits of the TV series and the sculpture has been designed so that members of the public can sit beside Captain Mainwaring and have their photograph taken. The statue was vandalised not long after the unveiling by a 10-year-old boy, who kicked it for ten minutes and broke off the statue's glasses, throwing them into a nearby river. The statue has since been fixed.

Several references to Dad's Army have been made in other television series. In a 1995 episode of Bottom, titled "Hole", Richie shouts Lance Corporal Jones's catchphrase while stuck up a Ferris wheel set to be demolished the following day. The British sitcom Goodnight Sweetheart paid tribute to Dad's Army in episode one of its second series in 1995, "Don't Get Around Much Any More". Here, lead character Gary Sparrow (Nicholas Lyndhurst) – a time-traveller from the 1990s – goes into a bank in 1941 and meets a bank manager named Mainwaring (Alec Linstead) and his chief clerk, Wilson (Terrence Hardiman), both of whom are in the Home Guard. When he hears the names Mainwaring and Wilson, Gary begins singing the Dad's Army theme song. In addition, a brief visual tribute to Dad's Army is made at the start of the episode "Rag Week" from Ben Elton's 1990s sitcom The Thin Blue Line: a shopfront bears the name "Mainwaring's".

In June 2018, the Royal Mail issued a set of eight stamps, featuring the main characters and their catchphrases, to mark the comedy's 50th anniversary.

In 2020, Niles Schilder, for the Dad's Army Appreciation Society, wrote four short scripts which detailed how the characters from the series would have, in the author's opinion, dealt with the events of that year. Titles of the scripts included Dad's Army Negotiates Brexit and An Unauthorised Gathering.

The characters of Edward Lowe and John Le Breton in the book series The Lowe and Le Breton Mysteries by Stuart Douglas are based on Arthur Lowe and John Le Mesurier at the time they were making Dad's Army.

=== Cultural influence ===
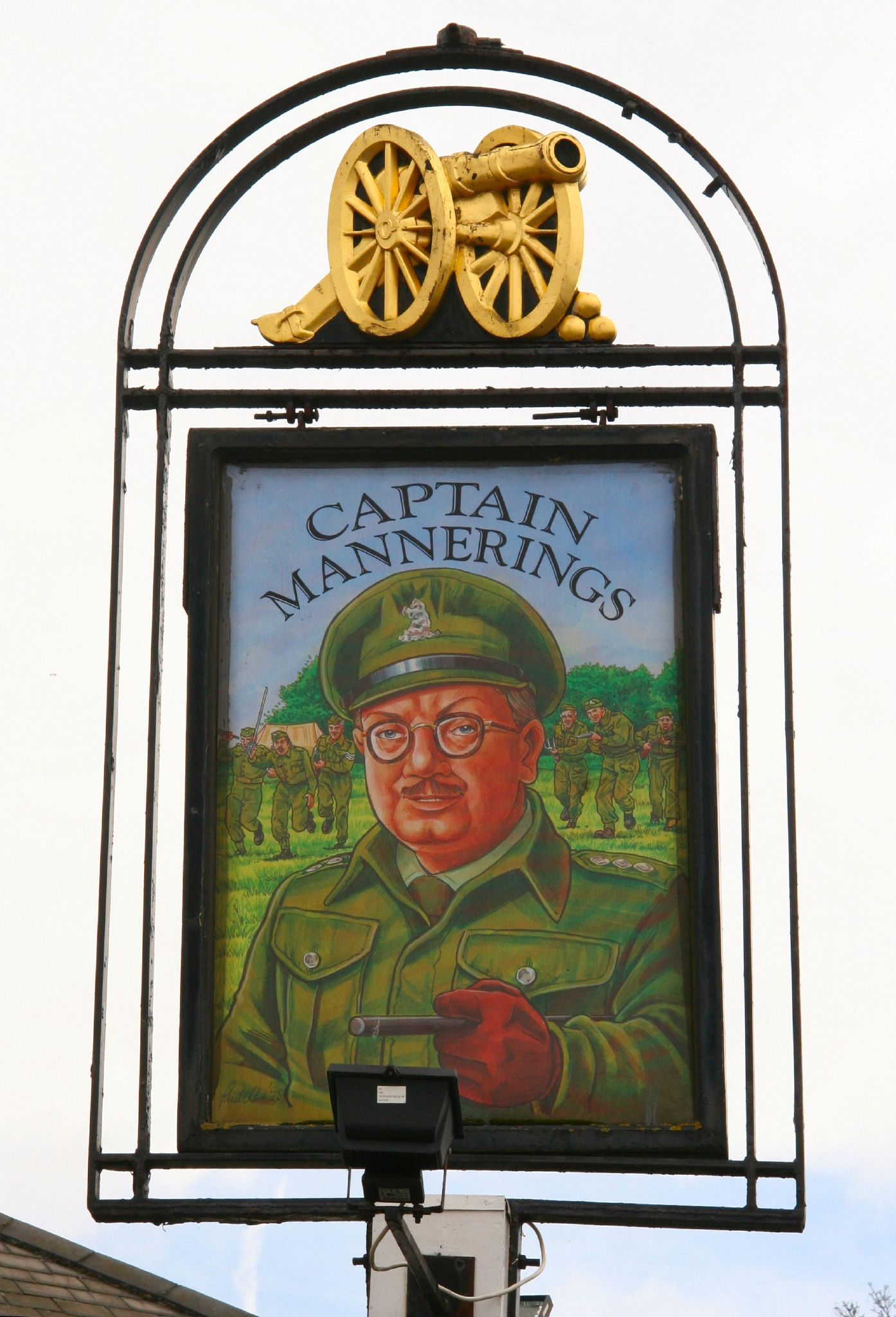
A pub in Shoeburyness named (albeit spelled incorrectly) after Arthur Lowe's character

The characters of Dad's Army and their catchphrases are well known in the UK due to the popularity of the series when originally shown and the frequency of repeats.

Jimmy Perry recalls that before writing the sitcom, the Home Guard was a largely forgotten aspect of Britain's defence in the Second World War, something which the series rectified. In a 1972 Radio Times interview, Arthur Lowe expressed surprise at the programme's success:

We expected the show to have limited appeal, to the age group that lived through the war and the Home Guard. We didn't expect what has happened – that children from the age of five upwards would enjoy it too.

By focusing on the comic aspects of the Home Guard in a cosy south coast setting, the television series distorted the popular perception of the organisation. Its characters represented the older volunteers within the Home Guard, but largely ignored the large numbers of teenagers and factory workers who also served. Accounts from Home Guard members and their regimental publications inspired Norman Longmate's history The Real Dad's Army (1974).

== Media releases ==
The first DVD releases of Dad's Army were two "best of" collections, released by the BBC and distributed by 2 Entertain, in October 2001 and September 2002. The first series and the surviving episodes of the second series, along with the documentary Dad's Army: Missing Presumed Wiped, were released in September 2004, while the final series was released in May 2007. In November 2007, the final episodes, the three specials "Battle of the Giants!", "My Brother and I" and "The Love of Three Oranges", were released, along with Dad's Army: The Passing Years documentary, several Christmas Night with the Stars sketches, and excerpts from the 1975–76 stage show. From the third series DVD, We Are the Boys..., a short individual biographical documentary about the main actors and the characters they portrayed on the programme, was included as a special feature.

The Columbia film adaptation is separately available; as this is not a BBC production, it is not included in the boxed set.

In 1973, the series was adapted into a comic strip, drawn by Bill Titcombe, which was published in daily newspapers in the UK. These cartoon strips were subsequently collected together and published in book form, by Piccolo Books, in paperback.

== See also ==
- British sitcom
- Dad's Army Appreciation Society
- Dad's Army Museum
- Bressingham Steam and Gardens
- Charles Burrell Museum
- Blitz and Pieces (another Dad's Army museum)
- Jones's van
- The Rear Guard (unsuccessful American adaptation)
