= Private Pike =

Fictional character in from the sitcom Dad's Army

- Dad's Army character
- First appearance: The Man and the Hour
- Last appearance: Never Too Old
- Portrayed by: Ian Lavender; Blake Harrison; Tom Rosenthal

In-universe information
- Full name: Frank Pike
- Occupation: Bank clerk
- Relatives: Arthur Wilson (father); Mavis Pike (mother); Unnamed Half-Sister; George (uncle); Lettice (great-aunt)
- Nationality: British
- Affiliated with: Home Guard

Private Frank Pike is a fictional Home Guard private and junior bank clerk, first portrayed by actor Ian Lavender in the BBC television sitcom Dad's Army. He was appointed as the platoon's information officer by Captain Mainwaring in "The Man and the Hour". He is frequently referred to by Captain Mainwaring as "stupid boy".

== Personality ==
Pike was born in 1922, and is the youngest of the Walmington-on-Sea platoon. He is aged 17 when the series begins, and as such, he is not old enough to join the army, although presumably he has reached, or is nearing, his 18th birthday when he is about to receive call-up papers in "When You've Got to Go"; in the event, it is revealed that he has a rare blood type that excludes him from military service. In "War Dance", it is revealed to Mainwaring from Wilson that Pike "is going on 19". He lives in the shadow of his bossy and over-protective mother, Mavis Pike, who is in a relationship with Sergeant Wilson. Wilson is referred to by Pike as "Uncle Arthur" and is hinted to be Pike's father. If this is so, Pike has an older half-sister by Wilson's estranged wife. The writers, Jimmy Perry and David Croft, confirmed after the series that Wilson was Pike's father. This was also revealed in the radio series (and sequel to Dad's Army) It Sticks Out Half a Mile where Mainwaring meets Wilson in the branch at Frambourne, where Wilson is the manager. On chatting to Wilson, he says "And how's your son?" Wilson laughs in an embarrassed tone and says that he has left the bank and is now an Under Manager at Woolworths. Wilson's tone shows that he must be the father and Mainwaring's question shows that he knows the truth. Pike's mother is supposedly a widow; it is unclear if there ever really was a Mr Pike, as he is never clearly mentioned. The radio series also reveals that Frank's mother has moved to Frambourne too.

Pike often threatens to set his mum on either Captain Mainwaring or Sergeant Wilson if he is shouted at or forced to do something. Although naïve, Pike is aware something is going on with his mother and Wilson:

Pike: "By the time we finish supper, it's always so late, you never leave our house until after I've gone to bed and then you're back early for breakfast before I'm awake. But what I can't understand is that I never hear you leave at night and I never hear you come back in."
Wilson: "Well I let myself in and out very quietly"
Pike: "You don't do anything else very quietly!"

Early in series 1, Pike shows some mild romantic attraction to Janet King, Mainwaring's secretary, when he talks to her about his guard duties. In "War Dance", Pike becomes engaged to an Army girl called Violet Gibbons who works in a fish and chip shop, but the engagement is called off. Later on, Pike starts seeing a young cinema girl called Ivy, who speaks so quietly that nobody can ever hear her say anything. He briefly develops a crush on Hodges's niece Sylvia, but that quickly fizzles out.

In "The Royal Train", it is revealed that Pike can drive a steam locomotive, having learned to do so at the Schoolboys' Exhibition.

Pike is naïve and acts childishly; he has limited grasp of adult issues. He is frequently found with confectionery, is upset in "The Big Parade" to leave a cinema early because "I haven't seen the Donald Duck yet" and can be petulant to superiors. This annoys Captain Mainwaring, who refers to him as a "stupid boy" due to his carelessness and mistakes and his bouts of childish humour. In "Gorilla Warfare", Mainwaring opines that Pike is "slightly retarded". Mainwaring treats Pike as a child, sometimes threatening to send him home from meetings if he does not behave. Mainwaring also treats Pike as a dogsbody, and gives him menial, demeaning, dangerous or undignified tasks, refusing to "mollycoddle" him. Pike frequently ends up wet, covered in mud or otherwise humiliated. In "Things that Go Bump in the Night", he is stripped several times and has to run naked through a field to escape dogs. Pike does, however, sometimes show some maturity. In "Menace from the Deep", when Pike has lost all the food brought out to the pier by not tying up the boat correctly, he apologises to each member of the platoon on the pier. In the episode "Something Nasty in the Vault", he refuses to leave the bank (and his "Uncle Arthur") when it is discovered that Wilson and Mainwaring are precariously cradling an unexploded German bomb in the bank's vault.

Although Pike comes up with sensible solutions to problems encountered by the platoon, he treats "everything as if it's a game", to quote Mainwaring in "All is Safely Gathered In". Notably, in "The Deadly Attachment", Pike is put on an ominous 'list' by a German U-Boat captain due to Mainwaring's incompetence at preventing the German from learning Pike's name ("Don't tell him, Pike!"), spelling his doom should the Germans win the war; however, as Pike had sung a childish song about Adolf Hitler in front of this officer, it is his own fault in refusing to take the situation seriously. He would rather play at being a Chicago gangster with the platoon's grenades or Tommy gun. He exasperates Mainwaring but he is humoured by other members, particularly Lance Corporal Jones, Private Godfrey and Private Walker. Pike is one of the most timid members of the group, but was the first in the series to fire on a suspected enemy, in "The Enemy Within the Gates", even though it turned out to be a swan.

Pike appears sickly and unhealthy, though most of his "illnesses" stem from his mother's protectiveness. She usually makes him wears a claret and blue scarf with his Home Guard uniform, which supposedly prevents him from getting croup, even though only infants and (apparently) chickens are supposed to get it ("Menace from the Deep"). Despite all this, in the episode "When You've Got to Go", he is certified fit for military service and is set to enter the RAF (to his mother's horror). However, after donating blood during a blood drive, it is discovered that Pike has an extremely rare blood type and he ends up being excluded from active service (though in typical Pike fashion, he doesn't reveal this to the rest of the platoon until after they've given him a going-away party).

Pike is a fan of the cinema and narrates the plots of films that relate to the platoon, even if the relationship is vague. When the film example does mirror reality, he picks scenarios that end in death.

Pike makes pointless comments while trying to help: this is illustrated in "Absent Friends". Jones, Mainwaring, Pike and Wilson are searching for an escaped convict, with the help of the police.

Jones: "Perhaps they're hidin' behind the bushes, sir. They do a lot of hidin' behind bushes, do policemen. Especially when they're knockin' people off."
Mainwaring: "I don't think that's very likely, Jones."
Pike: "In that film, 'Public Enemy Number One', they hid behind cars. But there aren't any here."

Pike's name is a reference to the spear-like weapons issued to the Home Guard in 1942, generating "an almost universal feeling of anger and disgust from the ranks".

Ian Lavender was invited to choose Pike's scarf from the BBC costume department. As a supporter of Aston Villa, he chose the team's colours.

A Barclays Bank advert featured Arthur Lowe as George Mainwaring retiring from his position at the bank, with Pike taking over as manager.
