= Jimmy Perry =

English scriptwriter and actor (1923–2016)

Jimmy Perry OBE
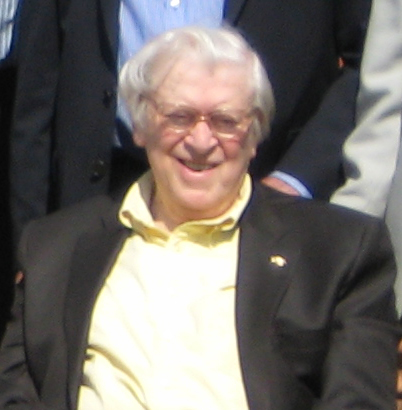
- Perry in 2011
- Born: James Perry; 20 September 1923; Barnes, Surrey, England
- Died: 23 October 2016 (aged 93); Hammersmith, London, England
- Occupations: Scriptwriter; actor
- Spouse: Gillian Margaret Holland (m. 1953, separated)
- Partner: Mary Husband (1999–2016)
- Children: 1
- Relatives: Jane Perry (third cousin); Diane Holland (sister-in-law)
- Writing career
- Period: 1960–1993
- Genre: Television
- Notable works: Dad's Army (1968–1977); The Gnomes of Dulwich (1969); It Ain't Half Hot Mum (1974–1981); Room Service (1979); Hi-de-Hi! (1980–1988); You Rang, M'Lord? (1988–1993); High Street Blues (1989)

James Perry (20 September 1923 – 23 October 2016) was an English scriptwriter and actor. He devised and co-wrote the BBC sitcoms Dad's Army (1968–1977), It Ain't Half Hot Mum (1974–1981), Hi-de-Hi! (1980–1988) and You Rang, M'Lord? (1988–1993), all with David Croft. Perry co-wrote the theme tune of Dad's Army, "Who Do You Think You Are Kidding, Mr. Hitler?" along with Derek Taverner, for which Perry received an Ivor Novello Award from the British Academy of Songwriters, Composers and Authors in 1971.

== Early life ==
Perry was born in Barnes, Surrey on 20 September 1923. His father, Arthur, was an antiques dealer, whose shop was in South Kensington, London. He was a founder of the British Antique Dealers' Association. His son was educated at two independent schools, Colet Court and St Paul's School, which at the time were both based in Hammersmith in West London.

The teenaged Perry partly served as the model for the mummy's boy character Private Pike in Dad's Army. In a 2013 interview with Neil Clark for The Daily Telegraph, he said his own mother "didn't go so far as making me wear a scarf, but she came pretty near". He was a regular visitor to the cinemas and the theatres in Hammersmith, and his school report said: "We fear for his future". He left school aged 14. In an exchange with his father Perry commented, "I don't need any qualifications. I'm going to be a famous film star or a great comedian", to which his father responded with the phrase "you stupid boy".

After leaving school, he was sent to Clark's college to learn shorthand, typing and bookkeeping. He truanted, spending the whole of one summer reading Tarzan books on Barnes Common, rather than attending class. He worked in his father's antique shop and the carpet department of Waring & Gillow, before training as the maker of scientific instruments and working in a factory making naval telescopes. With the outbreak of the Second World War, his family moved to Watford just outside London, his father taking over the shop of an uncle.

In Watford, he served in the Home Guard, which he joined in 1940, and became involved in amateur dramatics.

Delaying call up at the insistence of his mother, he joined the First (Mixed) Heavy Anti-Aircraft Regiment of the Royal Artillery at Oswestry in 1943, and the camp concert party. The following year, he was sent to Bombay in India, and then Burma, being promoted in rank from gunner to bombardier in the process. He was active in the concert party at the Deolali base of the Royal Artillery, and later in Combined Services Entertainment. Demobbed and back in the UK, he trained as an actor at the Royal Academy of Dramatic Art (RADA) on a serviceman's scholarship, where his contemporaries included Joan Collins, Lionel Jeffries and Robert Shaw. He spent his holiday period working as a Redcoat in Butlin's Holiday Camps.

Initially working in repertory and West End musicals from 1950 after graduating from RADA, during the period 1956–1965, Perry was actor-manager at the Watford Palace Theatre, in collaboration with his wife, Gilda. Ruth Llewellyn, later Ruth Madoc, and best known for her role as Gladys Pugh in Hi-de-Hi, was one of the performers who appeared there during this time. The company included Glenda Jackson, along with many actors that would later join him in his comedy writing career including Michael Knowles, Colin Bean, John Clegg, and Mavis Pugh.

After leaving Watford Palace Theatre in 1965, when Watford council took over the theatre, Perry joined Joan Littlewood's Theatre Workshop as an actor working at its base, the Theatre Royal Stratford East. He remained with the company for two years.

== Comedy writer ==
=== Dad's Army (1968–1977) ===
Inspired after seeing a television showing of the Will Hay comedy Oh, Mr Porter! (1937), he decided to use Hay's comedy device of "the pompous man in charge, old man and young boy", for his own project. Meanwhile, Perry was also gaining work in television bit parts. He was sent by his agent, Ann Callender, to be cast in an episode of a sitcom starring Reg Varney entitled Beggar My Neighbour which was being produced by Callender's husband, David Croft.

Perry showed Croft an outline for a sitcom derived from his experiences in the Home Guard, then entitled The Fighting Tigers, which resulted in the producer taking the idea to Michael Mills, then the BBC Head of Comedy. With David Croft now involved with writing the scripts, as Perry had no writing experience at the time, the first series was commissioned under the new title of Dad's Army, which was suggested by Mills. Perry, credited with the original idea for Dad's Army, conceived the sitcom with the role of Walker in mind for himself, but Croft and Mills successfully dissuaded him. As well as the character of Private Pike, modelled on himself, an elderly man he had known in the Home Guard had served with Lord Kitchener and became the basis for Corporal Jones. Perry co-wrote the theme tune, "Who Do You Think You Are Kidding, Mr. Hitler?" along with Derek Taverner, for which Perry received an Ivor Novello Award for Best TV Signature Tune in 1971, from the British Academy of Songwriters, Composers and Authors.

The series did though have doubters within the BBC who feared mocking the Home Guard would not be well received. Perry recalled in 1997 that the BBC "did audience research on it before it went out. They showed the first episode to audiences for three whole days, and 99 per cent of people loathed it. They said, 'That bald-headed old man [Captain Mainwaring] doesn't even know his lines'." Despite the doubts, the first episode was screened on 31 July 1968, with Perry making a cameo appearance as the entertainer Charlie Cheeseman in the sixth episode, "Shooting Pains". At its peak, the show had ratings of 18 million. It ran for nine years, from 1968 to 1977, and led to two film versions (released in 1971 and 2016), a stage show and a radio version.

In the 2013 Telegraph interview, Perry said: "It amazes me. I think it's because it's the thing that all British people savour: we were on our own at that time and we didn't turn away. Dad's Army reminds us of our finest hour." Michael Palin, remembered how Dad's Army seemed to take over the BBC in the late 1960s and early 1970s saying 'when we were preparing the first Monty Python series, the BBC Light Entertainment wardrobe department had begun more and more to resemble an army barracks ... the culprit was Dad's Army."

=== The Gnomes of Dulwich (1969) ===
Shortly after Dad's Army began, Perry wrote The Gnomes of Dulwich (1969), which starred Hugh Lloyd and Terry Scott, who had previously appeared together in Hugh and I. Perry had always been very interested in gnomes; he originally intended it to be a short sketch for The Morecambe & Wise Show but it was his wife who persuaded him that there was a whole series in it. In 2009, Perry said the series two leads "were two gnomes who would sit by a pond and commented on life, race, religion – everything."

It lasted for one series of six episodes, and although Perry claimed the series was quite well received, it did not warrant a second series. However, the critics largely did not approve, one saying "I found the script banal and beyond reason", with another simply saying "what a load o of rubbish". All six episodes are missing from the BBC Archives, and are presumed lost; only a few stills and audio fragments survive.

=== Lollipop Loves Mr Mole (later Lollipop, 1971–1972) ===
Lollipop Loves Mr Mole (1971–1972), shortened to Lollipop for its second series, also featured Hugh Lloyd, and was Perry's only domestic sitcom. Both were written without a collaborator. Perry admitted in 2014 that he was not especially taken with the Terry and June type of sitcom.

=== It Ain't Half Hot Mum (1974–1981) ===
Perry and Croft continued their collaboration with It Ain't Half Hot Mum (1974–1981), which Perry's Times obituarist termed "humour of the broadest kind". Inspired by his wartime experience running the Royal Artillery Concert Party in Deolali, India "it was David's and my favourite", Perry told journalist Neil Clark in 2013, who expressed regret that it "appears to have fallen victim to political correctness". It is not repeated on the terrestrial channels, but was shown on UK Gold. Perry defended the series, acknowledging the language was homophobic, but maintaining "those were the attitudes people had during the war". He rejected criticism of the casting of Michael Bates as Indian character Rangi Ram. The series other leads included Windsor Davies and Melvyn Hayes and it ran for 8 series with 56 episodes, at its height the series attracted audiences of 17 million. The character of bombardier Solomons (played by George Layton) is thought to represent Perry when he was working with ENSA during WW2.

=== The Rear Guard (1976) ===
The Rear Guard was a 1976 pilot episode based on the Dad's Army episode, "The Deadly Attachment" made for the American network ABC, but neither Jimmy Perry or David Croft were involved in the writing process. The pilot was aired on 10 August 1976, and received overwhelming poor feedback from American audiences and did not develop into a series. In an interview Perry said that he and Croft "arrived in a limousine and left in a taxi".

=== Turns (1982–1989) ===
At the end of the 1970s, Perry became involved as presenter in a BBC series called Turns, dedicated to music hall acts of the 1930s and 1940s as featured in films of the era.

=== Hi-de-Hi (1980–1988) ===
For Hi-de-Hi! (1980–1988), Perry once again collaborated with David Croft. He used his time working as a Butlin's Redcoat as an inspiration. Perry said of the series in 2009 that "of all the shows that David Croft and I did together Hi-de-Hi!, from the first time it went on air, took off like a rocket." Despite the pilot episode attracting audience ratings of only 4.4 million, by the time the series came out audience ratings had increased to 15.45 million. It starred Simon Cadell, Paul Shane, Ruth Madoc and Jeffrey Holland. The character of Spike (played by Jeffrey Holland) is thought to represent Perry when he was a Butlin's Redcoat.

=== You Rang, M'Lord? (1988–1993) ===
You Rang, M'Lord? (1988–1993) was his last collaboration with Croft. Perry's grandfather had worked as a butler, and he had heard many anecdotes about life "below stairs". The series had been attempted before, during the early 1980s, when Croft was working with his other regular writing partner, Jeremy Lloyd. Lloyd eventually conceded that he was struggling to find enthusiasm in the series and instead turned to an idea for a sitcom about the French Resistance which became 'Allo 'Allo!. Five years later Perry and Croft seriously turned their attention to the project. The series is not as well known as the other Perry and Croft sitcoms and was not initially well received by the critics. The series regularly attracted audiences ratings of 10 million and has been successful in Hungary. The series featured many cast members from other series that Perry had worked on, including Michael Knowles and Donald Hewlett from It Ain't Half Hot Mum, Paul Shane, Jeffrey Holland and Su Pollard from Hi-de-Hi!, and Bill Pertwee from Dad's Army. Both Perry and Croft later cited You Rang, M'Lord? as their best work.

=== London Calling (1994) ===
In 1994, he worked on a sitcom about the early years of the BBC in the 1920s, London Calling, which was broadcast on radio for four episodes. "That's the one I was most proud, but the BBC said it was a bit old-fashioned", Perry said in 2014. Perry later said of the short radio series that "recording London Calling was the happiest week of my life."

=== Room Service (1979) and High Street Blues (1989) ===
Perry created two further short lived series without David Croft, Room Service (1979) for Thames Television and High Street Blues (1989) with co-writer Robin Carr. According to John Oliver, writing for the BFI Screenonline website, two of Perry's later series "remain contenders for the title of worst British sitcom". Perry even admitted that "they were terrible, so bad even the cameramen walked out. People are kind and often say 'Oh they couldn't have been as bad as all that.' Believe me, they were as bad as all that."

=== That's Showbiz, 'The Lights, The Music & The Knife In The Back' (1997) ===
Perry always retained a special fondness for the theatre. In the late 1990s, he started his most ambitious theatrical venture, a stage musical about the cut-throat world of comedy and the variety theatre which was called That's Showbiz, 'The Light, The Music & The Knife In The Back'. The music was by Roy Moore. The show premiered at the New Wimbledon Theatre in 1997. The show had a familiar cast for British television viewers, including Ted Rogers, Su Pollard, Carmen Silvera and Peter Baldwin. Perry said of the play that "the show had become an obsession. I got carried away totally with my own conceit and ego. But it was nearly there. It was originally called Dirty Old Comics. If I could have cut about half an hour off it and re-cast some of it, the show could have worked. Unfortunately I lost about £80,000."

=== Unmade Series ===
Throughout Perry's career there have been a number for ideas for series that were never pursued. After Dad's Army Perry wanted to do a show called True Brits which was to be set in Roman Britain with Donald Hewlett and Michael Knowles as Roman officers and Paul Shane as a local tribes person painting 'Romans Go Home' on walls and so on. Perry also wanted Su Pollard to feature in the series as a local Briton wearing square wooden glasses. David Croft was not keen and the series was never taken any further; it was also later pointed out that the series may have been too similar to Up Pompeii! and Monty Python's Life of Brian. In 2009, Perry admitted that he had also written a pilot for another series saying "The idea I thought could have worked. I also wrote a pilot with Rosemary Anne Sisson called Women With Wings about the women who delivered planes during the war."

Perry's career as a scriptwriter effectively ended with You Rang, M'Lord?. "I don't think my type of writing is watched any more," he told James Rampton, writing for The Independent in 1997. "There's a certain hardness and ruthlessness about today's humour. There's not a lot of love. The world's a tougher place now, and my type of writing is just too gentle." He did though admire Absolutely Fabulous, Men Behaving Badly and One Foot in the Grave. Perry's autobiography, A Stupid Boy, was published in 2002.

== Personal life, honours and death ==
Actress Jane Perry was Jimmy Perry's third cousin. In 1953, Perry married actress Gillian Margaret Holland (known professionally as Gilda Neeltje; born July 1933), younger sister of actress Diane Holland. He and his wife had one son, Jimmy, who predeceased his parents, dying at age 19 in 1977 in a motorcycle accident.

Perry was appointed an Officer of the Order of the British Empire (OBE) in the 1978 Birthday Honours, in the same list as David Croft (David John Andrew Sharland). In 1982 he was initiated into the Grand Order of Water Rats fraternity.

Perry died on 23 October 2016 in Hammersmith, London after a short illness, aged 93. He was survived by his wife Gillian (from whom he was separated) and his long-term partner, costume designer Mary Husband.

On 27 October, British politician Valerie Vaz paid tribute to Perry in the House of Commons and was joined, with references to Perry's best known comedy lines, by a number of other Members of Parliament. She said that "it struck me that we could hear those catchphrases ringing around No. 10. We could hear the cry of, 'Don't panic, Don't panic!' or, as the Prime Minister slaps down her recalcitrant and wayward colleagues, we could hear her muttering, 'Stupid boy'."

In reference to the line "Don't tell 'em Pike", from the episode The Deadly Attachment, Richard Osman said that 'when St. Peter asks for Jimmy Perry's name he's got a great gag lined up.'

Actor, comedian and presenter Michael Palin once said that Perry had "created one of the most endearing of all comedy classics. Their glorious cast has marched into television immediately. No success could give me more pleasure."

BBC Two repeated two episodes of Dad's Army and one episode of Hi-de-Hi in Perry's memory.

== Portrayals ==
The 2015 BBC TV film We're Doomed: The Dad's Army Story told the story of how Dad's Army developed from the original concept to the airing of the first episode. In the film Perry was played by Paul Ritter, with Sarah Alexander playing his wife Gilda.

== Acting credits ==
- 1955: The Water Gipsies: Mr. Mountain/Romeo (as James Perry)
- 1960: Les Cinq Dernières Minutes: Un agent (1 episode)
- 1966: Hugh and I: 1 episode
- 1967: Beggar My Neighbour: Jack Butt – 1 episode
- 1969: Dad's Army: Charlie Cheeseman (1 episode)
- 1969: The Gnomes of Dulwich: Gnome (1 episode)
- 1980: It Ain't Half Hot Mum: Major Forestt (1 episode)

== Writing credits ==
- 1968–1977: Dad's Army (80 episodes)
- 1969: The Gnomes of Dulwich (6 episodes)
- 1970: A Royal Television Gala Performance
- 1970: Wiltons' – The Handsomest Hall in Town
- 1971: Dad's Army (film)
- 1972: Lollipop Loves Mr Mole (12 episodes)
- 1974: It Ain't Half Hot Mum (57 episodes)
- 1976: The Rear Guard
- 1978: The Old Boy Network (1 episode)
- 1979: Room Service (7 episodes)
- 1980–1988: Hi-de-Hi! (58 episodes)
- 1982–1989: Turns (14 episodes)
- 1988–1993: You Rang, M'Lord? (26 episodes)
- 1989: High Street Blues (6 episodes)
- 1994: London Calling (4 episodes)

== Books ==
- Perry, Jimmy (2002). A Stupid Boy: The Autobiography of the Creator of Dad's Army. New York: Century. ISBN 978-0712-6233-84.
