= List of You Rang, M'Lord? characters =

This is a List of characters featured in the 1990 BBC situation comedy You Rang, M'Lord?. Set in the 1920s, the series, written by Jimmy Perry and David Croft, featured a large cast of recurring characters, both above and below stairs. Other non-household characters include friends of both the family and the servants, the staff of the Union Jack Rubber Company and various others.

== The Meldrum Family ==
- Colonel George, Lord Meldrum MC (Donald Hewlett) - The master of the house, Lord Meldrum is a respected member of the gentry. In the early 1890s he had married the only daughter of Lord and Lady Southwick and they had raised two children prior to his wife's death. He first started his fortune when he married his wife. In 1915 he had been conscripted as a Colonel into the British Army and had served in the Infantry on the Western Front. He has old-fashioned Victorian values, with a respectable title and position in society. However, his reputation is threatened by his affair with Lady Agatha, the wife of Sir Ralph Shawcross, and it is usually left to Alf to help him cover this up. He claims to deeply love Agatha, and is left heartbroken after she breaks off their affair. Despite his considerable wealth, he pays his workers poorly, and it is often hinted that he once employed slave labour in Africa.
- Captain The Honourable Edward "Teddy" Meldrum (Michael Knowles) - Teddy is Lord Meldrum's younger brother. Little is known about his past life apart from he tried to seduce the 16-year-old dormitory maid at Eton, when he was 19. During the First World War, he had been conscripted as a Captain into the British Army and had served in the Infantry on the Western Front. On September 16, 1918, Teddy fought in the Battle of Amiens, where, whilst leading his men forward was wounded by getting shot in the head by a piece of shrapnel fired from a heavy gun (referred to by everybody as a "bonk on the head"). Teddy was knocked unconscious and fell into a shell hole. Later he was discovered by and carried back to a nearby Hospital by Alf and James. By 1927 the Honourable Teddy is still unmarried and living in his brother's house. Due to the head wounds that he sustained in the war, he has a lust for servant girls, has had relationships with 5 previous maids (Maggie, Amy, Bella, Violet and Ethel) and has fathered children to them all (6 in all, the last one had twins!): he cannot resist their "shiny, scrubbed faces" and "scent of carbolic soap". After Ivy starts working in the house, he is also smitten by her, though she frequently resists. He is being forced by his brother to marry Madge Cartwright, the heiress to a soap dynasty, although is more interested in her maid, Rose. When Poppy elopes to Gretna Green to marry Dickie Metcalfe, Teddy takes the idea and elopes with Rose with the same intention, but this fails. Teddy eventually does marry Rose and raises a family with her. Following the loss of the family fortune, Teddy becomes a successful car salesman. He often says 'bally cheek!' and 'oh hang!'.
- Cecily "Cissy" Meldrum (Catherine Rabett) - Cissy is Lord Meldrum's elder daughter. Attractive, she dresses in a masculine style, takes part in men's sports and activities, such as flying (she is a qualified pilot), and her feminine "chum" Penelope is a frequent house guest. Thus, although never explicitly stated, there are many suggestions that Cissy is a lesbian, the many clues to which are not entirely obvious to her father. Cissy is a pleasant character, who shows genuine concern for the family and servants alike, often giving away feminine items such as dresses and make-up to Ivy (whom she shows an attraction to in early episodes, frequently winking at her). Cissy is also the member of the family who has genuine concern for the servants, making her very popular. She often socialises with her younger sister Poppy, but the two regularly bicker because of their differing attitudes. She proclaims herself a socialist and stands as a candidate for the United Workers Party, winning a seat on the council through Alf's machinations. Cissy eventually takes charge of the ailing Union Jack Rubber Company and forms a workers' co-operative (like they do in Russia) in an attempt to save the business.
- Poppy Meldrum (Susie Brann) - Poppy is Lord Meldrum's younger daughter (and by far the less grown-up of the two), born during Queen Victoria's funeral (2 February 1901, meaning she is 26), is a spoiled and unpleasant character who attends 'wild' parties with her friend, Jerry (John D. Collins). She is quite a snob about her position in society, often ready to remind those lower of her position, although at other times she confesses to feeling trapped by her class. Throughout the series, she is attracted to the footman, James Twelvetrees, whom she delights in leading on, despite being aware of the problems it could cause for him. She has an on-off relationship with Jerry, who she abandons when she meets Dickie Metcalfe, who is in fact a confidence trickster and is after her money. When George refuses to allow her to marry Metcalfe, she elopes with him to Scotland, but they are intercepted by the family and the servants after Lady Agatha reveals who Metcalfe really is. She eventually agrees to marry Jerry only after the family lose their fortune as she realises she will have to downgrade her lifestyle if she doesn't.
- Lady Lavender Southwick (Mavis Pugh) – Lady Lavender is Lord Meldrum's mother-in-law and she resides with her parrot, Captain, in the second bedroom of the house. She is very wealthy and has interests in many businesses including a large number of shares in the Union Jack Rubber Company. Lavender was born into an aristocratic family in the early 1850s, we are given to understand that she led a somewhat promiscuous youth, having many affairs, including with Boris the Crown Prince (later King) of Dalmatia (Davy Kaye). She then became involved with a young army officer called Captain Cedric Dolby (Maurice Denham), the two later became engaged, but separated shortly before he was sent off to fight in the Zulu war. After the death of her husband, Lord Southwick, Lady Lavender moved in with her daughter and son-in-law, becoming increasingly reclusive and senile, and enjoyed throwing plates of food at Ivy. Lavender had a habit of calling the staff different names. Ivy would be called "Ethel", Alf would be called "Capes" and Henry would be called "Steven". Lavender was very generous to the servants, giving them a suitcase with £10,000 in it, the family jewels, business company shares, and her bed. In the end it was Lavender who saved the Union Jack Rubber Company from collapse by selling her jewels and signing it over to Cissy.

== Servants ==
- Alf Stokes (Paul Shane) Butler - Alf Stokes is the scheming butler of the series. Alf is Ivy's father and is still married to Ivy's mother, despite their separation. Alf was a Private in the British Army on the Western Front, along with James Twelvetrees. After coming across the Honourable Teddy unconscious in a shell hole, Alf, believing him to be dead, attempted to mug him, much to James' disgust. After realising Teddy was alive, Alf decided to carry the wounded Teddy back to the field hospital as a way of saving his own life. This act secures Alf the job as butler nine years later at Lord Meldrum's house, after being forced to return to service after a failed career in showbiz. Alf and Ivy clearly and deeply love each other. Throughout the series, Alf devises a number of schemes to scam Lord Meldrum out of his money and possessions, although these usually fail. This dishonest aspect of his character was often an asset to Lord Meldrum; on a number of occasions Alf was required to create diversions for Sir Ralph. Alf also has a relationship with Mrs Lipton through the series, although it is revealed he did this just to borrow money from her. After the Meldrums' decline, Alf returned to showbiz, together (though just temporarily) with his daughter, Ivy.
- James Twelvetrees (Jeffrey Holland) Footman - Stern, upright, and often described by Alf Stokes as "pompous and po-faced", James Twelvetrees is the complete opposite of Alf. His act of helping Alf carry the wounded Honourable Teddy to hospital during the war secured him a job in the Meldrum household, although he would never admit this to the other servants, and by 1927 he has been with them for nine years. He has a tendency to snobbishness, frequently siding with the gentry instead of his own class and can be harsh towards anyone that he considers socially inferior to him, particularly Mabel and Henry; in spite of this, his devout Christian upbringing has left him with a keen sense of right and wrong, leading him to loan Mabel £1 to pay her rent when he realises that she is in danger of being evicted, and his embarrassment at having a burglar for a father leads him to claim that his father is - instead - a preacher. James' infatuation with Poppy Meldrum, and her manipulative habit of leading him on before reprimanding him for over-familiarity, left him contemplating resignation at times. He is shown to be desired both by aristocratic ladies (including Lady Agatha Shawcross) and housemaid Ivy; although he does not reciprocate Ivy's feelings, he does demonstrate a protective, guiding attitude towards her. After the Meldrums' financial losses, James (and most of the other staff) lose their jobs, but he uses his savings of around £227 17s. 9d. (according to Alf's stealthy browse through James' Post Office savings book) to rent a boarding house on the coast, and hires Ivy as his partner to run it.
- Ivy Teasdale (Su Pollard) Maid - Ivy is the well-meaning but rather naive maid, the daughter of Alf. Her father secured her the job as maid after he was appointed as butler, by forging her references. Ivy was born in Rotherham, 1902 (meaning she is 25). Her familial relationship with Alf is largely a secret, but she is forced to tell Henry when he spots the two alone in her bedroom, and later tells James when she needs his help to get Alf out of trouble. Despite her honesty, she is often persuaded to take part in her father's schemes. In the series, she has to avoid the advances of the Honourable Teddy, whilst also trying to attract the attention of James, who does not reciprocate her affection. She provokes various feelings in the Meldrum household; Poppy's jealousy of her friendship with James leads her to loan Ivy a dress for a party, only to spoil it by "accidentally" spilling wine over it, whereas Cissy treats Ivy more equally (and, judging by a conversation with her "chum" Penelope, initially seems to find her physically attractive), and because she is often fooled by the "eccentric old lady" persona, Ivy frequently finds herself used as target practice whenever Lady Lavender gets a sudden urge to throw unwanted plates of food across the room. After losing her job due to the Meldrums' financial problems, she joins a seaside variety act with her father, but later she decides to start a new life as James' partner in his boarding house.
- Blanche Lipton (later Blanche Wilson) (Brenda Cowling) Cook - Blanche Lipton joined the Meldrum household as a young housemaid in her teens and gradually rose through the ranks to become cook; although unmarried, she is given the usual cook's title of "Mrs." and her culinary skills are legendary. Mrs Lipton is rarely seen out of the kitchen. By 1927, she had worked for the Meldrum family for forty years. Although a kindly woman who shows sympathy for her betters and equals, Mrs. Lipton is particularly scathing towards those she considers inferior, such as Henry and Mabel. At the start of the series, she develops a relationship with Alf Stokes, willingly lending him money because she believes that he needs it to fund a divorce (although Ivy's allusion to the fact that Alf and her mother don't have a photograph from their wedding day implies that he may not be married at all) and baking huge quantities of cakes for an "orphanage" (in reality, Alf had spotted an opportunity to sell baked goods to a short-staffed tea room). Alf further deceives Blanche by enlisting an actress friend, Myrtle, to pose as an unwilling-to-divorce Mrs. Stokes; when an angry and frustrated Blanche unleashes her fury by throwing an entire dinner service at Alf, he manipulates her into thinking that he convinced Lord Meldrum not to sack her by paying for the damage, effectively clearing his debt to her. (In reality, Lord Meldrum had not been concerned about the incident and was persuaded to overlook it thanks to a kind word from the Honourable Teddy.) Mrs. Lipton later shifts her affections to PC Wilson, and when he reaches retirement age, they marry and move to his countryside cottage.
- Henry Livingstone (Perry Benson) Bootboy - Henry was born in 1909 (meaning he is 18) and was abandoned as a child in a basket on the steps of the Livingstone Road Orphanage, in which institution he remained until the age of 17, when he was taken into the Meldrum house as bootboy. Although the second lowest ranking servant in the house, Henry is often the most insightful, clever and talented character; he can play the piano and bugle and listens to the radio, but his habit of voicing his observations on whatever situation is unfolding is often seen as inappropriate, earning him a clip around the ear from whoever is closest. Henry is in love with Ivy and wants a relationship with her. Following the Meldrum's financial troubles, he becomes the joint butler/footman/bootboy after Alf and James are sacked.
- Mabel Wheeler (Barbara New) Charwoman - Mabel is the lowest ranking servant in the Meldrum household. She does not live at the Meldrum house and resides with her disabled, unemployed "old man who's flat on his back and can't do a hand's turn", in a poor part of London. She is regarded by some of the others as an outsider, James and Mrs Lipton in particular. Because of her low rank and social status, she is not allowed to have meals with the other servants, and is usually given some scraps to take home, which gave rise to her catchphrases "That'll be nice(!)" and "I can't remember the last time I had a...". Mabel was also usually not considered to be a house servant who could attend activities, such as church, prayers, and Mrs Lipton's wedding. Once Mabel stated that she believed she was looked down upon by the other servants because she was a "casual worker" and not a member of the live-in staff. Once Lord Meldrum decided to take the servants on a staff picnic and Mabel wondered if she could join in. James and Mrs Lipton stated Mabel was taking liberties and insinuated she was rubbish. Ivy was incensed by this and openly berated Mrs Lipton for the poor treatment of Mabel, which led to her being able to go. On another occasion, Mabel was invited by Alf to come to a servants' ball, just so she could go. When Mrs Lipton went on strike, Alf took the opportunity to treat Mabel by serving her thick slices of roast ham. When Lord Meldrum invites his workers for dinner and orders fish and chips to put them at ease, Mrs. Lipton's disdain for the aroma of the leftovers makes her only too glad to let Mabel take them home. Following the Meldrum's financial troubles, Mabel effectively becomes a maid-of-all-work, with a talent for making lumpy custard.

== Other characters ==
- Police Constable Wilson (Bill Pertwee) - PC Wilson was the local Bobby, although rarely appeared to be doing his duty. Instead he dined nightly with the servants, as was apparently the custom because the police would then overlook any indiscretion made by the family. He was generally ineffective as a policeman, although had become something of a wine connoisseur, due to his nightly selection from Lord Meldrum's cellar. He later married Mrs Lipton and the couple retired on his police pension.
- Sir Ralph Shawcross (John Horsley) - Sir Ralph is another wealthy member of London society, he has two residences: a London house and a country residence. He is married to Lady Agatha (her third husband) and is initially suspicious of Lord Meldrum's relationship with his wife, but eventually comes to regard him as a friend after he is led to believe that Meldrum is impotent and therefore not a threat. When the truth is revealed, he tries to kill Meldrum by cutting the brake pipes on his car and hunting him in the woods with a shotgun. He then turns to the black-arts to curse the House of Meldrum, which he believes has succeeded after the Meldrums lose their fortune.
- Lady Agatha Shawcross (Angela Scoular) - Lady Agatha is the wife of Sir Ralph and is also Lord Meldrum's mistress. Lady Agatha is 20 years younger than Sir Ralph, and 17 years younger than George. She conducts her affair with Lord Meldrum even when her husband is present in the house by secretly giving him sleeping pills. She had previously been assistant matron at Eton but had been sacked following an incident with a number of students. She had two previous husbands before she married Sir Ralph, but it is also implied that she has plenty of lovers, who she entertains at her mews apartment. It is strongly hinted that she once had an affair with Dickie Metcalf, Poppy's fiancé. She blatantly shows affection towards Lord Meldrum's footman, James Twelvetrees. She once hinted that she would like to have an affair with Teddy, stating that she finds him attractive and hypothetically suggests dressing up as a servant girl to fulfil his sexual preference. She breaks off her affair with Lord Meldrum after he loses his money when his business declines.
- Madge Cartwright (Yvonne Marsh) - The sole heiress to the Cartwright Soap business empire, she resides in a luxury flat in Mayfair and is a regular visitor to the house. On one occasion, Teddy comments that Madge was a society debutante in 1903, suggesting that she is in her early-to-mid forties. She is a longtime admirer of Teddy, and the two become engaged. She does not realise that Teddy secretly despises her, and only proposed to her because George threatened to deport him if he didn't. She chases Teddy north when he tries to elope with Rose at the same time Poppy elopes with Dickie Metcalf. She initially forgives Teddy for this act, but later breaks off their engagement after Teddy is honest about what he thinks of her, and tells her of his intention to marry Rose.
- Charles, the Lord Bishop (Frank Williams) - Charles is the Lord Bishop, and a close friend of the family. He is a frequent visitor at the Meldrum house, often accompanied by his young chaplain, Robin (Robbie Barnett). He usually visits when he wants money, whether it be for his home for distressed gentlewomen, or items for his charity auction. He also takes the Sunday services at the local church, which the family and the servants attend. He remains a good friend even after the financial losses of Lord Meldrum.
- Jerry (John D. Collins) - Jerry is the longtime boyfriend of Poppy Meldrum, generally silly and given to heavy drinking. The morning after parties and nights out, he is often found unconscious by the servants in various places in the house, such as behind the harmonium or under the dining room table. He is bossed around by Poppy, and is unaware of her attraction to the footman, James Twelvetrees. He also seems to be unaffected by her brief relationship with Dickie Metcalf and the fact that she tried to run away and marry him. He eventually marries Poppy after the Meldrums lose their fortune.
- Rose (Amanda Bellamy) - Rose was Madge Cartwright's housemaid, who was pursued by Teddy. Unlike all the other maids Teddy chased, Rose reciprocated the attraction, and eloped with him to Gretna Green to get married. This attempt failed, however, as they were caught up by Madge Cartwright and the Meldrum family. Following this incident, Madge sacked Rose, and Alf secured her a job in another household. However, this did not stop her from seeing Teddy. Finally, Teddy broke off his engagement to Madge and married her, thus making her a rich aristocrat. By 1928, Rose was expecting their first child.
- Selfridge (Hugh Lloyd) - Selfridge was Sir Ralph Shawcross's butler. He was an alcoholic who regularly stole wine from Sir Ralph's cellar. He was sacked from his position after he was caught, and Sir Ralph offered his job to James Twelvetrees. However, Selfridge was reinstated after Miss Poppy (who didn't want James to leave) blackmailed Lady Agatha into forcing Sir Ralph to withdraw the offer. Selfridge was later sacked again, but not before revealing to Sir Ralph that Lady Agatha was having an affair with Lord Meldrum.
- Mr Pearson (Felix Bowness) - A delivery driver for Teetgen's (the grocery suppliers), who brought the Meldrum household their weekly groceries and collected their payment. His delivery van was once commandeered by PC Wilson to chase Dickie Metcalf, who was eloping with Miss Poppy in a stolen car.
- Miss Potter (Judith Fellows) - The owner of the Sunshine Pantry tearooms, who bought Mrs Lipton's cakes from Alf, believing they were from a high-class confectionery firm. She was forced to do this after her partner left her and she was struggling to keep the business going by herself.
- Hortence Anstruther (Angela Easterling) - A colleague of Cissy Meldrum's from the United Workers Party. She ran the soup kitchen and was a strict vegetarian.
- Penelope Barrington-Blake (Sorel Johnson) - A friend of Cissy Meldrum's - strongly implied to be her girlfriend, although unlike Cissy, she dresses in a very feminine style. She is once caught in bed with Cissy by Ivy after they return home in the early hours. She frequently goes out on the town with Cissy, Poppy and Jerry and subsequently stays the night. It is revealed that her father made his fortune from paint.
- Dickie Metcalf (Robin Lermitte) - A confidence trickster and thief, who was cashiered from the Guards for cheating at cards, he pretends to be the scion of a tea plantation owner in Ceylon and writes dud cheques - it is strongly implied that he once had an affair with Lady Agatha and was subsequently blackmailing her. He then became involved with Poppy Meldrum and eloped with her to Gretna Green in a stolen car. The couple were being pursued by the Meldrum family, their servants and PC Wilson, who caught up with them at Watford Gap and prevented the marriage. Dickie was last seen flying off in Cissy's plane, which he had just stolen.

=== The Union Jack Rubber Company ===
- Mr Foster (Michael Lees) - Mr Foster is the factory Manager. He is disliked by most of the workforce, who do not like the way he sucks up to Lord Meldrum. He attended a dinner party which Lord Meldrum threw for his workers, and worked with Cissy to save the factory when it started to decline.
- Mr Barnes (Ivor Roberts) - Mr Barnes is the foreman. He has worked in rubber for 35 years, and is consequently an expert. He also attended the workers' dinner party. When the factory was threatened with closure, he conspired with Alf Stokes and Jock MacGregor to burn down their main rivals' factory, the Acme Rubber and Latex Company, although this was never actually carried out.
- Jock MacGregor (Stuart McGugan) - The Scottish shop-steward (and the Union leader), often portrayed as a class warrior, or at least a left-wing agitator. He works in the factory testing department and is scathing of the Meldrums, as he sees that it is his hard work and labour that have given them their fortune. He attended the workers' dinner party, and was attracted to Miss Poppy. He was highly supportive of Alf's plan to burn down the Acme Rubber and Latex Company to put their main rival out of business.

== Non-speaking and unseen characters ==
- Captain - Captain was Lady Lavender's pet parrot, and was voiced (uncredited) by Jeffrey Holland. He had apparently fought in the Indian Mutiny, Siege of Lucknow, Anglo-Zulu War, and WW1. Whenever Ivy knocked on Lavender's door, Captain would say "Come in", then Lavender would say "oh shut up come in", then Captain would copy her. Once after Lavender had given Union Jack Rubber Company shares to Ivy, Alf, and Henry, she gave them all to captain, who in turn ate them all up except the seal. Captain would also say "pieces of eight". Captain was once met a female parrot, bought by Lavender from Harrods, and they were married by Constable Wilson. However, it turned out that the other parrot was male, as well. Lavender then lifted up the cage blanket (unseen to the audience) and said "well they seem to be managing all right," implying that Captain was homosexual. It was later revealed that Lavender thought the other parrot was boring (because he never said anything) so she sent him back to Harrods. Lavender once considered leaving Captain all her money. In one of the later episodes, Captain became ill and died. Lavender gave him a military funeral in the pet cemetery, which required George, Teddy, Alf and James to wear their military uniforms, and ordered PC Wilson to do the sermon (as he did at the wedding). Lavender also put valuable jewellery in the coffin, that was later dug up by Wilson. Lavender made a sculpture, tombstone, and poem for Captain, and mentioned him in the next four episodes.
- Lady Meldrum (née Southwick) - Lady Meldrum was the wife of George, the mother of Cissy and Poppy, and the daughter of Lady Lavender. Not much is known about her, although she assisted James in arranging the house flowers. It is unknown if George was having his affair with Lady Agatha while she was still alive. She was never seen on-screen. Early in the series, Cissy alludes to the fact that her mother has been dead for three years, suggesting that Lady Meldrum died in about 1924.
- Lord Southwick - Lord Southwick was the husband of Lady Lavender. He was married to her in 1879. It is unknown if he knew of her affairs. Not much is known about him, as he is never seen on-screen. According to her, he drowned in the Bosphorus. His death made Lavender move in with her daughter's family, the Meldrums.
