= Jeffrey Holland (actor) =

English actor (born 1946)

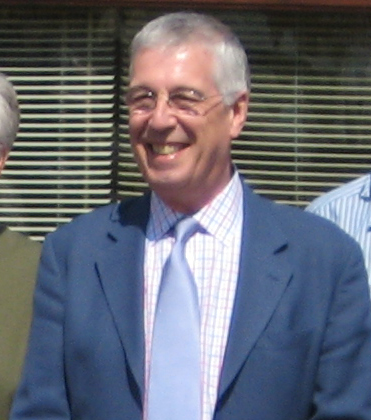
- Jeffrey Holland in May 2011.
- Born: Jeffrey Michael Parkes; 17 July 1946 (age 80); Walsall, England, United Kingdom
- Occupation: Actor
- Years active: 1963–present
- Spouses: Eleanor Hartopp (m. 1971, divorced) Judy Buxton (m. 2004)
- Children: 2

Jeffrey Michael Parkes (born 17 July 1946), known professionally by his stage name, Jeffrey Holland, is a British actor from Walsall, England. He is well known for roles in television sitcoms, playing comic Spike Dixon at the 'Maplin's holiday camp' in Hi-de-Hi!, as well as BBC Radio comedy, including Week Ending. He also played leading roles in the sitcoms You Rang, M'Lord? and Oh, Doctor Beeching!. Holland was a major part of the David Croft repertoire.

== Early life ==
Born in Walsall, he was educated at Queen Mary's Grammar School, Walsall. Holland joined an amateur theatre company and soon found that he had a talent for comedy, but despite this he could not pursue a career in comedy until after he left home. He has said that "my father died when I was 14, so right after leaving school at 16 I secured a job to earn money to help my mother. I worked at a wine merchant's and an office in Walsall, where I was brought up".

After leaving home Holland trained at Birmingham School of Speech Training and Dramatic Art and became a professional actor. On joining the actors' union, Equity, he was forced to adopt a stage name as another actor with a similar name to his was already registered. He chose the surname 'Holland' as it had been his grandmother's maiden name. His first stage appearance was at the Alexandra Theatre in 1967, in No Fear or Favour, a play by Henry Cecil Leon.

Holland first appeared on television in Crossroads, but this was in a non-speaking role. His first speaking role came in an episode of Dixon of Dock Green in 1974. He has described Jack Warner, who played Dixon, as "a perfect gentleman".

== Acting career ==
After Dixon of Dock Green Holland worked with Jimmy Perry and David Croft for the first time when he took over the role of Private Walker in the Dad’s Army Stage Show.

Throughout the 1970s Holland made one-off guest appearances in television shows such as Are You Being Served, Dad's Army and It Ain't Half Hot Mum. He also appeared in several episodes of Crossroads but it was in 1980 that he broke through to fame in the role of Spike Dixon, the resident comic at Maplin's holiday camp in Hi-de-Hi! by Jimmy Perry and David Croft, who were already well acquainted with his work. Later that year Holland appeared alongside Russ Abbot in The Russ Abbot Show and Russ Abbot’s Madhouse.

Jimmy Perry and David Croft used three main Hi-de-Hi! actors, Paul Shane, Holland and Su Pollard, for their next joint project, You Rang, M'Lord?, which ran from 1988 to 1993. Holland played the footman James Twelvetrees. You Rang, M’Lord? was not as successful as Hi-de-Hi! in the United Kingdom, but it was very well received in Central and Eastern Europe, particularly in Hungary. When attending an event in Budapest Holland said: "I’d never heard anything like it. I could have been Elvis Presley or The Beatles, the noise they made. I did my bit, when off stage I burst into tears because it was so overwhelming". Holland once again worked alongside Paul Shane and Su Pollard in another series by David Croft, Oh, Doctor Beeching!. It ran from 1995 to 1997 and was co-written by Richard Spendlove.

In 2001 Holland performed in Goon Again, the 50th anniversary celebration of The Goon Show. He took the parts originally played by Peter Sellers.

In 2011 Holland appeared in Coronation Street as Clive Drinkwater.

In 2012 he was cast in the film version of Ray Cooney's farce Run for Your Wife as Dick Holland. The film was met with an overwhelmingly negative response from both critics and audiences.

In 2013 he debuted his short one-man play ... And This Is My Friend Mr Laurel, based on the life of Stan Laurel, at the Camden Fringe festival. This was taken on tour in the UK in 2014–2015. The play was devised by Holland and written by Gail Louw.

2017 saw Holland lead the company of The Wolverhampton Grand's in-house production, the stage adaptation of Brassed Off. The play, in which he played band leader Danny, ran from 23 August to 2 September.

In November 2020 Holland attended a virtual Hi-de-Hi! reunion via Zoom, which was streamed to YouTube. Also attending the reunion were his co-stars from the show including Su Pollard, Ruth Madoc, Nikki Kelly, Linda Regan and David Webb.

In 2021 Holland made his first appearance in the radio and podcast sitcom Barmy Dale playing the role of Rev Wilkins, he stars alongside his wife Judy Buxton who plays Mildred Wilkins. In 2025 Barmy is hoping to move from podcast to television.

In April 2021 the British Comedy Guide reported that Holland would be co-starring in a new comedy pilot called Simply Ken, set in Sheffield in the 1980s. It was reported that starring alongside Holland would be his wife Judy Buxton and Craig Shepherd in the title role. Co-creator Alan Marni expressed his confidence about the project, saying that "it’s a great script, we’re got some great actors".

On 6 February 2025, Holland published his memoirs entitled 'The First Rule Of Comedy...! Memories And Moments'. Comedy Historian Robert Ross was his co-author. The following day, Holland and Ross hosted a book launch in London at 'Nell of Old Dury Pub'. In attendance was Holland's wife, Judy Buxton, Hi-De-Hi! stars Su Pollard and David Webb, along with director Roy Gould and 'Allo 'Allo star Vicki Michelle.

== Personal life ==
Holland has been married to the actress Judy Buxton since 2004.

== Filmography ==
=== Film ===
Year	Title	Role	Notes
2012	Run for Your Wife	Dick Holland	
2015	Art Ache	Stephen Phillips	
2016	The National Union of Space People	Rupert Darling	

=== Television ===
Year	Title	Role	Notes
1974	Dixon of Dock Green	Alan Hunt	Episode: "Pay-Off"
1974	Crossroads	Mike Hawkins	11 episodes
1976	It Ain't Half Hot Mum	RAF Airman	Episode: "Flight to Jawani"
1977	Are You Being Served?	The Afro Pants	Episode: "The Old Order Changes"
1977	Dad's Army	The Soldier	Episode: "Wake-Up Walmington"
1977	Secret Army	Michel	Episode: "Too Near Home"
1977	It Ain't Half Hot Mum	Aircraftsman Ormanroyd	Episode: "The Superstar"
1978	The Mayor of Casterbridge	Carter	5 episodes
1978	BBC Television Shakespeare	Duke of Surrey	Episode: "King Richard the Second"
1978	BBC Television Shakespeare	William	Episode: "As You Like It"
1979	Are You Being Served?	The Blazer	Episode: "The Apartment"
1979	The Life of Henry the Fift	Nym	TV film
1980–1988	Hi-de-Hi!	Spike Dixon	All 58 episodes
1981–1985	Russ Abbot's Saturday Madhouse	Various	43 episodes
1984	The Cannon and Ball Show	Jess the Maitre'd	Episode: #5.6
1985	The Kenny Everett Television Show	Various	3 episodes
1986	Spitting Image	Lester Piggott	Voice; Episode: #3.3
1986	The Ballad of Johnny Vanguard	Johnny Vanguard	TV pilot
1987–1989	The Les Dennis Laughter Show	Various	9 episodes
1988–1993	You Rang, M'Lord?	James Twelvetrees	All 26 episodes
1990	The Russ Abbot Show	Various	4 episodes
1991	Noel's House Party	James Twelvetrees	Episode: #1.3
1995–1997	Oh, Doctor Beeching!	Cecil Parkin	All 20 episodes
2011	Coronation Street	Clive Drinkwater	Episode: #1.7749
2020–2025	Barmy Dale	Reverend Wilkins	6 episodes
2021	Simply Ken	Stan	TV pilot
