= Nikki Kelly =

English actress (born 1951)

- Born: Nicola Caroline Kelly; 23 November 1951 (age 74); Leamington Spa, Warwickshire, England
- Occupation: Actress
- Years active: 1974-present

Nicola Caroline Kelly (born 23 November 1951) is an English actress, who is best known for her role as Sylvia Garnsey in the long-running British sitcom Hi-de-Hi!.

Born in Leamington Spa in Warwickshire, Kelly is the great-niece of eminent actor and theatrical manager Sir Johnston Forbes-Robertson, who co-founded RADA in 1904. His daughter, and Kelly's aunt, was actress Jean Forbes-Robertson, best known for portraying Peter Pan on stage.

Kelly completed the three year acting course (Diploma of Speech & Drama) at the Rose Bruford College of Speech & Drama, between September 1971 and July 1974. She gained early theatre experience working in a number of repertory companies across England. She made an early television appearance in Dixon of Dock Green in 1975, and starred in the sex film You're Driving Me Crazy in 1978. However, she is best known for appearing in all nine series of Hi-de-Hi! as Yellowcoat Sylvia.

== Film roles ==
Year	Title	Role
2015	Silent Hours	Harriet Blakeney

== Television roles ==
Year	Title	Role
1980 to 1988	Hi-de-Hi!	Sylvia Garnsey
1993	The Upper Hand	
2009	As Seen on TV	Herself
2017	Steph and Dom's One Star to Five Star	Herself

== Theatre roles ==
In the 1970s, Kelly performed in the original productions of such stage plays as There Goes the Bride (1974) and Snatch 69 (1975) and in several overseas tours, including No Sex Please, We're British in Sweden, Confessions of a Window Cleaner in Zimbabwe, and Who Goes Bare in South Africa. At the peak of the television fame in the late 1980s, Kelly appeared as an Olympic volleyball player in Dig Volley Spike at the Old Red Lion Theatre in Islington and performed opposite John Inman in a production of Derek Benfield's farce Bedside Manners, which opened at the Salisbury Playhouse in March 1989 and toured for seven months.

During that period, Kelly also began to perform regularly in pantomime. In December 1989, she appeared as the Wicked Queen Griselda in a production of Snow White and the Seven Dwarves at the Hexagon Theatre in Reading, which subsequently transferred to the Grand Theatre, Leeds. She has since reprised the role in numerous other incarnations of the show, including productions at the Grand Theatre, Swansea (1990/91), the Broadway Theatre, Catford (2008/09), the Marina Theatre, Lowestoft (2010/11), the Palace Theatre, Redditch (2011/12) and the Harlequin Theatre, Redhill (2013/14). Kelly has also performed the comparable roles of the Evil Queen or Fairy Carabosse in various productions of Sleeping Beauty at the Middleton Arena, Rochdale (2009), the Connaught Theatre, Worthing (2012/13) and elsewhere. Kelly has also appeared as the Wicked Witch in a pantomime version of The Wizard of Oz.

In March 2010, Kelly appeared in a revised version of the stage adaptation of Hi-de-Hi, in which she played ballroom dancer Yvonne Stuart-Hargreaves (originally performed in the television series by the late Diane Holland). The role of Yvonne's husband, Barry, was reprised on stage by its original portrayer, Barry Howard.
