= British-Jewish theatre =

Jews have long been involved in British theatre and have massively influenced it as a result. A significant proportion of British theatre's actors, writers, directors, and producers come from Jewish backgrounds, including Steven Berkoff, Peter Brook, Ryan Craig, Nicholas Hytner, Bernard Kops, Mike Leigh, Gail Louw, Patrick Marber, Sam Mendes, Jonathan Miller, Julia Pascal, Harold Pinter, Nina Raine, Diane Samuels, Tom Stoppard, Samantha Ellis and Arnold Wesker. (Note: For a longer list, see the list of British Jewish entertainers page.)

British-Jewish theatre is shaped by specific historical, ideological, and institutional contexts and frameworks. Common themes include the controversies around the Israeli–Palestinian conflict and the still-prevalent role played by Jewish stereotypes and antisemitism in British society. Many British theatre practitioners grew up in specifically Jewish homes, influenced by parents or grandparents who were Jewish immigrants. It was common in these homes that Hebrew was read, Yiddish was spoken, Jewish food was eaten, body language not common in British society was employed, and speech patterns that were not normatively British were used; these speech patterns would later be found in the works of Berkoff, Kops, and Pinter.

In 2011, writer Peter Lawson argued that Israel Zangwill's 1899 stage adaptation of his own 1892 novel Children of the Ghetto: A Study of a Peculiar People (which focused on Jewish immigration to London's East End) had become the first notable British-Jewish play. In 2012, Britain's longest-serving theatre critic Michael Billington wrote, "It is virtually impossible to think of modern American theatre without the influence of Jewish artists. [...] The question of what makes a play Jewish is one I don't feel competent to answer [as a non-Jew]. What is clear, even if one confines oneself to Britain and America, is modern theatre's heavy dependence on Jewish writers."
