= Opening Day (disambiguation) =

Opening Day is the day on which professional baseball leagues begin their regular season.

Opening Day may also refer to:

- "Opening Day" (Brockmire), a 2019 television episode
- "Opening Day" (Hi-de-Hi!), a 1984 television episode
- "Opening Day" (The Twilight Zone), a 1985 television episode
- "The Opening Day", a 1991 episode of television series The Brittas Empire
