= Hi-de-Hi! =

British TV sitcom (1980–1988)

- Opening credits of Hi-de-Hi!
- Genre: Sitcom
- Created by: Jimmy Perry; David Croft
- Written by: Jimmy Perry; David Croft
- Starring: Paul Shane; Ruth Madoc; Jeffrey Holland; Su Pollard; Simon Cadell; David Griffin; Leslie Dwyer; Felix Bowness; Diane Holland; Barry Howard; Nikki Kelly
- Country of origin: United Kingdom
- Original language: English
- No. of series: 9
- No. of episodes: 58 (list of episodes)

Production
- Executive producer: David Croft
- Running time: 53 x 30 minutes 1 x 40 minutes 3 x 45 minutes 1 x 60 minutes
- Production company: BBC

Original release
- Network: BBC1
- Release: 1 January 1980 – 30 January 1988

Hi-de-Hi! is a British sitcom created by Jimmy Perry and David Croft, and produced by the BBC. The programme initially began with a pilot on 1 January 1980 and aired for nine series between 26 February 1981 and 30 January 1988. It starred Paul Shane, Su Pollard, Jeffrey Holland, Ruth Madoc and Simon Cadell.

Inspired by Perry's time as a Redcoat at Butlin's, the series is set in the fictional Maplins holiday camp in Essex towards the end of the traditional British holiday period of the 1950s. The episodes themselves focus on the lives of the camp's entertainers and staff, who frequently greet campers with the titular phrase "Hi-de-Hi!", and consist mostly of struggling actors, comedians, wannabe stars, and has-been entertainers.

The programme proved popular from its launch, gaining large audiences during its broadcast; its popularity helped it to win a BAFTA as Best Comedy Series in 1984. In a 2008 poll on Channel 4, Hi-de-Hi! was voted the 35th most popular comedy catchphrase. By 2015, the series began receiving repeats, initially with the BBC alongside other sitcom classics by Croft and Perry, and subsequently moved onto being repeated on Gold.

== Synopsis ==
Hi-de-Hi! is mainly set within a holiday camp situated in the fictional seaside town Crimpton-on-Sea, Essex, covering the summer holiday seasons of 1959 and 1960. Owned by Maplin's, and run by staff for owner Joe Maplin, the camp operates in a similar manner to real-life holiday camps, including providing entertainment and activities through its staff of Yellowcoats – a parody of the real-life Redcoats, Bluecoats, and Greencoats. The Yellowcoats are led by Ted Bovis, the camp host, and consist of three different groups of entertainers: the young, who see the job as a lucky break into show business; the middle-aged, who are realistic about their prospects but still cling to the hope that they can still achieve fame; and the veterans, the oldest members of staff who see their job as a step down from former stardom glories.

Many of the stories focus on the relationships between the characters, the constant issues that arise from Ted's attempts to scam the camp's holidaymakers, and other issues sometimes brought on by Maplin himself. The sitcom notably focused on a common theme in stories surrounding the erosion of class boundaries during the post-war period and attitudes of staff towards each other – a recurring element in stories is chalet maid Peggy Ollerenshaw's desire to be a Yellowcoat and the dislike Yellowcoat sports organiser Gladys Pugh has for this idea.

== Cast ==
- Paul Shane as Ted Bovis – The Camp's Entertainment Host, and a former entertainer. Tasked with greeting and entertaining campers, he also secretly runs scams and rackets to make money on the side. After the show concluded in 1988, Shane would be one of several cast members to work on later sitcoms by Croft.
- Ruth Madoc as Gladys Pugh – The Camp's radio announcer and sports organiser. The writers devised her to be the romantic foil for the entertainment manager, while being snobbish around the Yellowcoats and Peggy.
- Jeffrey Holland as Spike Dixon – The camp's chief comic for the 1959 and 1960 season, acting as Ted's conscience during times when his scheming could lead to trouble. Holland would join with Shane on working on further sitcoms made by Croft.
- Su Pollard as Peggy Ollerenshaw – A chalet maid at Maplins, with dreams of becoming a Yellowcoat and achieving stardom. This dream became a recurring element in some of the stories for Hi-de-Hi. Peggy achieves her dream in the series finale, only for it to be taken away when the camp closes for good at the end of the 1960 season. Like Shane, she would work on further sitcoms by Croft.
- Simon Cadell as Professor Jeffrey Fairbrother (Series 1–5) – The camp's entertainment manager for the 1959 season. A former archaeology professor from Cambridge University who takes the job to escape academia and meet "real people", he struggles to adapt and is wooden when making speeches or presenting to campers. Cadell left the sitcom after the fifth series to focus on other projects.
- Felix Bowness as Fred Quilley – The camp's riding instructor for horse rides, and a former race jockey. Bowness would join in with Croft's later sitcoms, but would have less prominence as a recurring guest star.
- Diane Holland as Yvonne Stuart-Hargreaves – An upper-class dance instructor, part of a husband-and-wife pair of former ballroom champions. Yvonne sees herself as a cut above the rest of the campers and even her husband, Barry.
- Barry Howard as Barry Stuart-Hargreaves (Series 1–7) – Yvonne's husband and dance partner. Like Yvonne, he presents an upper-class demeanour but she is quick to remind him of his lowlier roots and his real name, "Bert Pratt". Howard was forced to leave the production after unruly drunken conduct. Barry was then written out in Series 8.
- Leslie Dwyer as Mr William Partridge (Series 1–6) – A children's entertainer, working as "Whimsical Willie" the Punch and Judy man at Maplins, who has a drinking problem and a dislike of children. The oldest member of staff and a former a music hall performer at the Holborn Empire who even entertained King George V, his career was cut short by World War I and he remained bitter ever since. Dwyer was forced to drop out midway through the production of the sixth series due to his declining health. The writers wrote his character out of the sitcom in response, having him fake his own death to run away with a barmaid.
- Nikki Kelly as Sylvia Garnsey – A female Yellowcoat staff member, with a flirtatious behaviour with the camp's entertainment managers. The writers devised Kelly's character to be a constant foil towards that of Madoc's character, with the sitcom exploring their relationship over the two holiday seasons.
- David Griffin as Clive Dempster (Series 6–9) – The camp's entertainment manager for the 1960 season, he is an upper-class former RAF Squadron Leader and wartime hero. Although sharing a similar background to his predecessor, Dempster had a slightly shifty nature with money and was not above getting involved with Ted's schemes. Griffin was brought in to replace Cadell following his departure.
- Ben Aris as Julian Dalrymple-Sykes (Series 5, Series 8–9) – A dance instructor and a former lover of Yvonne, brought in to replace Barry after his departure. Aris initially made a guest appearance in the fifth series as a warning to Howard to get his drinking under control; he later joined the main cast as Howard's replacement.
- Kenneth Connor as Sammy Morris (Series 7, Series 8–9) – A shady children's entertainer, brought in to replace Partridge during the 1960 season. Connor had a guest appearance in the seventh series then joined the cast for the final two series.
- David Webb as Stanley Mathews, and Tony Webb as Bruce Mathews – Identical twin brother Yellowcoats. Both David and Tony maintained minor roles to begin with, but were given more involvement by the third series. In the credits, the brothers are referred to collectively as "The Webb Twins".
- Chris Andrews as Gary Bolton – A male Yellowcoat staff member. Originally portrayed by Terence Creasy in the pilot, the character was unnamed to begin with and played a minor role. The writers gave Andrews more prominence by the start of the third series.
- Penny Irving as Mary (Series 1) – A female Yellowcoat staff member for the 1959 holiday season. Irving left the show after the first series, claiming it wasn’t very funny.
- Rikki Howard as Betty Whistler (Series 1–5) – A female Yellowcoat staff member for the 1959 holiday season, with a strong dislike of Gladys' overbearing nature towards herself and other female staff. Howard left the sitcom after the fifth series.
- Gail Harrison as Val (Series 2) – A female Yellowcoat staff member for the 1959 holiday season.
- Susan Beagley as Tracey Bentwood (Series 3–5) – A female Yellowcoat staff member for the 1959 holiday season, who, like Betty, clashes with Gladys' personality on the camp. Like Rikki Howard, Beagley left the sitcom after the fifth series.
- Gavin Richards as Harold Fox (Series 5–7) – The General Manager of Maplin's, known as the "Smiling Viper."
- Linda Regan as April Wingate (Series 6–9) – A female Yellowcoat staff member for the 1960 holiday season, with a somewhat childish personality. Writers devised the character to be a love interest for Spike, with a number of stories looking in to the development of their relationship with each other.
- Laura Jackson as Dawn Freshwater (Series 6–9) – A female Yellowcoat staff member for the 1960 holiday season. Jackson's character was devised by the writers to be similar to that of previous Yellowcoat women, but with a secret attraction to Dempster during the final holiday season for the camp.
- Ewan Hooper as Alec Foster (Series 8–9) – Maplin's Camp Controller, abusing his power at every turn until Sammy Morris gets him recalled to Head Office.

== Production ==
=== Filming ===
Hi-de-Hi! relied on BBC studios for interior scenes for the entertainment staff building and interior chalet rooms, but much of the exterior scenes for Maplins were shot at Warners' former holiday camp that operated within the town of Dovercourt near Harwich, Essex; the site is now a housing estate after the camp was closed in 1990. During the pilot episode and the first two series, filming at the camp was done in early spring before the main holiday period for the public during the summer months – the temperature at the time led to complaints by cast members; Jeffrey Holland in particular had to be treated for hypothermia owing to scenes that saw him thrown into the camp's pool. Other locations around Essex were used during the show's filming, including around the town of Manningtree; and a couple of episodes were filmed at Weybourne railway station on the North Norfolk Railway (also used in Dad's Army).

== Episodes ==
A pilot episode for the sitcom was first broadcast on 1 January 1980. Hi-de-Hi! was later greenlighted to additional episodes, running for 60 episodes over nine series, between 26 February 1981 and 30 January 1988. Unusually, the third and fourth series were actually run back-to-back by the BBC; all subsequent reruns separated the episodes.

== The stage shows ==
Hi-de-Hi was made into a musical, called Hi-de-Hi! – The Holiday Musical, in the early years of the show. Labelled as a "summer pantomime" by its critics, the production featured most of the TV cast plus several new characters. It did not follow the television storylines, but it was a success nonetheless. It did a summer season in Bournemouth in 1983, a Christmas season in London in 1983 and a summer season in Blackpool in 1984. It was short-lived, however, when some of the cast complained that filming the TV series and doing the summer show limited their offers of acting jobs elsewhere.

A second stage show entitled Hi-de-Hi! Spirits starred Shane, Madoc, Griffiths and Regan. The show (this time a comedy, not a musical) is set in a warehouse on the banks of the Thames and concerns whiskey smuggling of illicit vodka. The show was popular but not a favourite of the writers.

At the height of its audience ratings, the BBC had plans to make it into a feature film, but this did not come to fruition.

In August 2009, Hi-de-Hi! stage show played in Torquay.

In March 2010 the show was revived for a six-month national tour produced by Bruce James Productions Limited and written by Paul Carpenter and Ian Gower, adapting scenes and storylines from episodes of the television series including A Night Not To Remember and Maplin Intercontinental. The audience were treated as campers during scenes involving camp entertainment which included musical numbers and audience participation. The production starred two members of the original cast, Barry Howard, reprising his role of Barry Stuart-Hargreaves, and Nikki Kelly, originally Sylvia, taking the role of Yvonne Stuart-Hargreaves. The tour also starred Peter Amory as Jeffrey Fairbrother, Abigail Finley as Peggy Ollerenshaw, Rebecca Bainbridge as Gladys Pugh, Damian Williams as Ted Bovis, Ben Roddy as Spike Dixon, Richard Colson as William Partridge, Andrew Fettes as Fred Quilley, Kate Burrell as Sylvia Garnsey, Lauren Harrison as Betty Whistler and Carrie Laurence as Tracey Bentwood. Several performances of the tour had to be cancelled due to low ticket sales despite positive reviews.

Following the end of the tour an amended version of the script was made available for amateur performances. The script lacks many of the camp entertainment scenes, including the musical numbers, whilst adding a subplot featuring Ted's ex-wife from the episode Trouble and Strife. The original tour set and costumes are available for hire from Bruce Jones Productions Limited.

Amateur productions include those by the Teignmouth Players Amateur Dramatic Society at the Carlton Theatre, Teignmouth, The Western College Players at the Drum Theatre, Plymouth, (both in July 2011), and The Halifax Thespians at the Halifax Playhouse in March 2012, this production directed by renowned Halifax playwright Alan Stockdill. In May 2019, the Brookside Theatre, Romford staged a production. It was staged by The Crowborough Players in May 2013.

A stage play for amateur production by Paul Carpenter and Ian Gower was originally available from Samuel French Ltd of London but now licensed in the UK by Concord Theatricals.

== Theme music and merchandise ==
Hi-de-Hi! had a rock and roll style theme tune called "Holiday Rock". Sung by Ken Barrie, who would later provide the voice of Postman Pat, on the series opening titles, the song was later released as a single with the main vocal part sung by Paul Shane and the Yellowcoats (it featured several members of the cast on backing vocals). It became a UK Top 40 hit in May 1981. Paul Shane and Ruth Madoc appeared in character on Cheggers Plays Pop in June 1981 for a mimed performance of the song.

In 1981 the album Hi-De-Hi - Songs And Fun From The Staff Of Maplin's Holiday Camp was released, featuring standards of the era performed in character by the cast.

Hi-de-Hi! was merchandised by the BBC with official products such as board games, albums, books, toys and T-shirts available to buy.

== After Hi-de-Hi! ==
Several principal cast members were reunited in another period piece by the same writers called You Rang, M'Lord?, which piloted in 1988, and ran for four series to 1993, and again in Oh, Doctor Beeching! by David Croft and Richard Spendlove from 1995 for two series.

== Home releases ==
Series One and Series Two, including the pilot, were released in a boxed set by Universal Playback on 3 March 2003, followed by a boxed set of Series Three and Series Four on 5 April 2004. The Series 5 and Series 6 was released in a boxed set on 23 October 2006. Universal Playback encountered problems when releasing the first four series on DVD because they did not hold the rights to the soundtrack. As a result, some of the episodes were edited. Series Seven was released on 5 May 2008. Series Eight and Series Nine were released in a double pack on 22 September 2008. A complete boxed set containing all 9 series has also been released.

DVD Title	No. of Discs	Year	Episodes	DVD release		Notes
DVD Title	No. of Discs	Year	Episodes	Region 2	Region 4	Notes
Complete Series 1 & 2	3	1980–1982	13	3 March 2003	2 March 2006	Includes the 1979 Pilot
Complete Series 3 & 4	3	1982–1984	13	5 April 2004	3 July 2006	—
Complete Series 5	2	1984	13	23 October 2006	—	—
Complete Series 6	2	1985-1986	7	5 May 2008	—	—
Complete Series 7 & 8	3	1986–1988	12	22 September 2008	—	—
Complete Series 1–8	13	1980–1988	58	9 November 2009	—	A boxset containing every episode

== See also ==
British sitcom

== Bibliography ==
- Radio Times Guide to TV Comedy, Mark Lewisohn, BBC Worldwide Ltd, 2003
- British TV Comedy Guide for Hi-de-Hi!
- Hi De Hi Based On The BBC TV Series, Paul Ableman, 1983
- Hi-De-Hi Companion, Rob Cope and Mike Fury, 2009
