= Very Big Very Soon =

British TV sitcom (ITV, 1991)

- Genre: Sitcom
- Created by: Justin Sbresni
- Written by: Daniel Peacock
- Directed by: Paul Harrison
- Starring: Paul Shane; Tim Wylton; Kate David; Sheila White; Shaun Curry; Andrew MacLean
- Composer: Debbie Wiseman
- Country of origin: United Kingdom
- Original language: English
- No. of series: 1
- No. of episodes: 6

Production
- Producer: Glen Cardno
- Production locations: Glossop, Derbyshire, England
- Running time: 30 minutes
- Production company: Central Independent Television

Original release
- Network: ITV
- Release: 19 July – 23 August 1991

Very Big Very Soon is a 1991 British sitcom starring Paul Shane as Harry James, an actor's agent. Other characters include his assistant Ernie Chester (played by Tim Wylton), Beattie, Harry's romantic interest, played by Kate David.

Only six episodes were produced.

== Cast ==
- Paul Shane as Harry James
- Tim Wylton as Ernie Chester
- Kate David as Beattie
- Sheila White as Avril
- Shaun Curry as Vic
- Andrew MacLean as Matthew Kite

== Episodes ==
No.	Title	Original release date
1	"Ladies Night"	19 July 1991
2	"The Taxman"	26 July 1991
3	"Double Dealing"	2 August 1991
4	"The Dummy's Curse"	9 August 1991
5	"Thanks for the Memory"	16 August 1991
6	"Amore"	23 August 1991
