= Paul Shane =

English actor and comedian

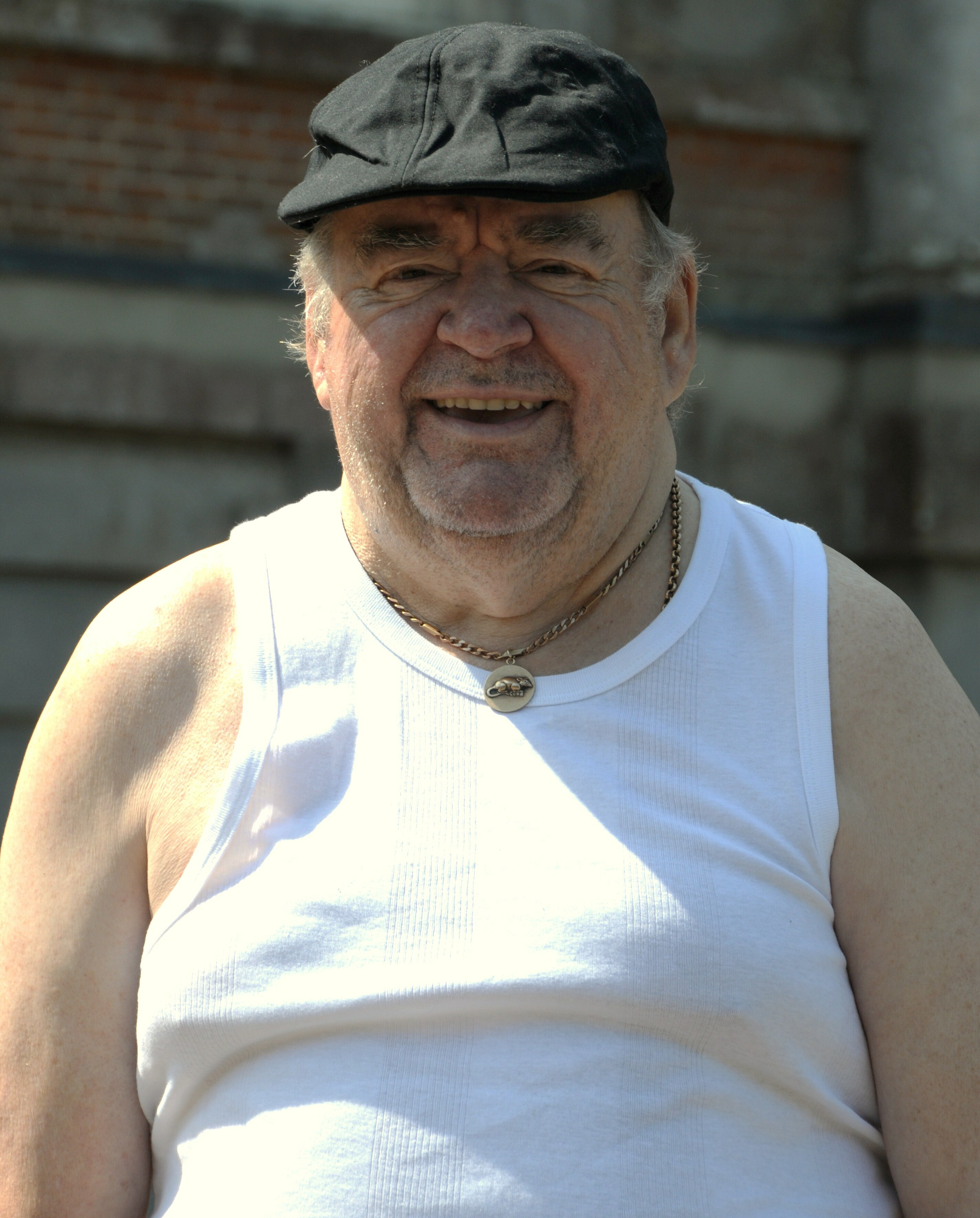
- Shane in 2011
- Born: George Frederick Speight; 19 June 1940; Thrybergh, West Riding of Yorkshire, England
- Died: 16 May 2013 (aged 72); Rotherham, South Yorkshire, England
- Occupations: Actor, comedian
- Years active: 1972–2013
- Spouse: Dorothy Shortt (m. 1961; died 2001)
- Children: 3

George Frederick Speight (19 June 1940 – 16 May 2013), known professionally as Paul Shane, was a British actor and comedian. He was known for his television work, in particular for playing Ted Bovis in the 1980s BBC sitcom Hi-de-Hi!.

== Early life ==
Shane was born on 19 June 1940 as George Frederick Speight, in Thrybergh, near Rotherham, in the West Riding of Yorkshire. After leaving school in 1955, he was a miner at Silverwood Colliery until he suffered double herniated discs after slipping on soap in the pithead baths in 1967, being pensioned from the coal mines as a result. Two years later he became a professional entertainer. He already had ten years' experience as a part-time entertainer in pubs and clubs in south Yorkshire.

== Career ==
Shane's first appearance, as a singer, was at the Grafton pub — now demolished — in St Ann's Road, Rotherham. His first club booking was at St Ann's Club in Rotherham, for 30 shillings. His transformation from singer to comedian was gradual, starting with his version of "Green, Green Grass of Home", which was straight at first, but ultimately became a send-up of the version by Tom Jones.

Shane played small parts and made guest appearances in television series throughout the 1970s. In May 1979, the comedy writer Jimmy Perry spotted Shane playing Frank Roper in an episode of Coronation Street and offered him the part of Ted Bovis in his new holiday-camp sitcom Hi-de-Hi!. The series ran for 58 episodes from 1980 until 1988, when Perry and his co-writer David Croft wrote the pilot of You Rang, M'Lord? and invited Shane to play Alf Stokes. That show ran until 1993.

In 1991, Shane was given his own show, Very Big Very Soon, which ran for one series.

Shane's performance of "You've Lost That Lovin' Feeling" on Pebble Mill at One in 1996 was voted the 72nd-funniest moment on British television in an opinion poll on Channel 4 in 2004.

Between 1995 and 1997, Shane played Jack Skinner in two series of Oh, Doctor Beeching!, another David Croft devised series. Subsequently, he appeared most frequently in theatre, including Oliver!, though he also had guest spots in Holby City, Common as Muck and Emmerdale on television.

Shane also appeared in variety theatre in towns including Blackpool in 2006, and in pantomime in Jack and the Beanstalk in 2008. In 2008, he was in an episode of the ITV drama series A Touch of Frost, playing boatsman "Diesel Bob". He was the subject of This Is Your Life in 1981, when he was surprised by Eamonn Andrews in London's Covent Garden.

== Personal life and death ==
Shane was married to Dorothy Shortt (born 28 February 1943) from 1961 until her death on 4 April 2001 aged 58. They had three daughters.

On 1 April 1984, he was inducted into the Grand Order of Water Rats.

In May 2009, Shane was admitted to the Northern General Hospital in Sheffield for heart surgery and made a full recovery.

Following another short period of ill-health, he died on 16 May 2013 in a Rotherham hospice, aged 72. His funeral was held on 31 May 2013 at Rotherham Minster.

== Filmography ==
Year	Title	Role	Details
1972	A Day Out	Baldring	Television film
1973	Sporting Scenes	Charabanc driver	Episode: England, Their England
1975–1980	Play for Today	Various	
1976	Second City Firsts	Ricky Avon	Episode: Summer Season
1976	Centre Play	Garage clerk	Episode: Showcase: Riding South
1977	Coronation Street	Dave-the-Rave	2 episodes
1979	Coronation Street	Frank Roper	
1979	Afternoon Off	Alf	Television film
1979–1980	Turtle's Progress	Mashcan	1 Episode
1980	Sounding Brass	Gray	3 Episodes
1980–1988	Hi-de-Hi!	Ted Bovis	58 episodes; also title music, uncredited
1982	Muck and Brass	Dennis Catto	Episode – Our Green and Pleasant Land
1983–1989	Blankety Blank	Himself	8 episodes
1984	A Century of Stars: The Story of the Grand Order of Water Rats	Himself	Television documentary
1986	Super Gran	Sid Scouse	Christmas Special – Super Gran and the World's Worse Circus
1988–1993	You Rang, M'Lord?	Alf Stokes	26 episodes;
1991	Very Big Very Soon	Harry James	4 Episodes
1993	Woof!	Honest Norman	Episode: The Sure Thing
1993	Cracker	Pillarbox	Episode: The Mad Woman in the Attic (Part Two)
1994	Mother's Ruin	Ernie Potts	Series 1 episode 3
1995–1997	Oh, Doctor Beeching!	Jack Skinner	20 episodes
1995	ChuckleVision	Perry Champagne	Episode – My Lucky Number's 9
1996	New Voices	Ernie	Episode – Two Minutes
1996	La Passione	Papa	
1996	Between Two Women	Mayor	
1997	Common As Muck	Mike Roberts	6 episodes
1999	Hilltop Hospital	The Teds (Voice role)	
1999	Kavanagh QC	Greg Dallimore	Episode: End Game
2000	Doctors	Bill Joseph	4 Episodes
2000–2004	Holby City	Stan Ashley	13 Episodes
2002	Heartlands	Zippy	
2003	Between Two Women	Councillor Hoylake	
2004	Emmerdale	Solomon Dingle	8 Episodes
2007	Children in Need	Concierge	
2008	A Touch of Frost	Diesel Bob	Episode – In the Public Interest
2012	The Grey Mile	Terry the Taxman	Video short; final role
