= Silent Hours =

2015 film directed by Mark Greenstreet

- Directed by: Mark Greenstreet
- Written by: Mark Greenstreet
- Produced by: Emma Pounds
- Starring: James Weber Brown; Indira Varma; Dervla Kirwan; Hugh Bonneville
- Cinematography: Alfie Biddle
- Production company: Gallery Pictures
- Release dates: 25 September 2015 (Raindance); 1 January 2020
- Running time: 165 minutes
- Country: United Kingdom
- Language: English

Silent Hours is a 2015 psychological thriller film written and directed by Mark Greenstreet. It stars James Weber Brown, Indira Varma, Dervla Kirwan and Hugh Bonneville.

== Plot ==
Ex-Royal Navy officer and private investigator John Duval collects his cameras after filming a woman and her stepson having sex on a private yacht, delivering the footage to her jealous husband. He then attends a dinner party with his estate agent best friend Henry Wright, Wright's wife (and Duval's old flame) Tobi, and Duval's girlfriend Rachel. He then has consensually violent sex with Rachel.

He takes on another case from Commander William Calthorpe, who Duval surmises suspects his wife Rosemary. Rachel's beheaded and dismembered body is found in the yacht in the sexual position in which the stepmother was filmed. Duval investigates a tape found by Tobi at her house - she admits to having a vision of a woman dead and dismembered in an empty bath on touching the tape, Duval tracks the house's previous owner Mary Woodward, and a radio engineer manages to find a wiped voice on the tape which matches Duval's.

Duval continues to regularly see therapist Dr Caroline Benson, admitting his close escape from drowning during the Falklands War, his blackouts, his move to naval intelligence, a dropped rape charge brought by a junior female officer, and his departure from the navy. He trails Rosemary to Hayling Island, only to find her dead body on the beach. Duval uses a key given him by Calthorpe to let himself into the couple's flat, finds a suitcase full of Spanish currency, and hides on the balcony when a woman identical to Rosemary undresses at the window.

This turns out to be Rosemary's identical twin Sorrel, with whom Duval has sex - she is found dead soon afterwards and it is ascertained that she, Rosemary and Sorrel had been attempting to steal the currency from Calthorpe. Ex-fisherman Harrison takes Duval to a Solent fort - they are followed there by a masked man who kills Harrison. Duval realises that Calthorpe was taking large bribes from a Spanish supplier resupplying British warships calling at Gibraltar which he had been investigating in intelligence - on being confronted Calthorpe admits this, admits he had only used Duval to identify Harrison, then shoots himself.

Tobi uses a key she still has to Duval's flat to let herself in and ask Duval to use bondage on her. On Good Friday Duval stays at a soon-to-be-sold house with inhabited by an older woman who attempts to seduce him. The following morning he finds her dead and dismembered in the bath, cleanses the crime scene, and leaves. Duval goes to the police for questioning but is arrested for all of the murders.

Benson examines him to establish if he is sane enough to make a plea in court and whilst Duval is in custody Tobi goes missing. Duval tells Benson that Wright was also involved in Calthorpe's scam. The police release Duval and arrest Wright and soon afterwards Tobi's body is discovered dismembered in a bath at one of the vacant properties on Wright's books.

Two police detectives discuss the case that evening and one of them notes the seeming coincidence that Mary Jane Kelly was found on Dorset Street, later renamed Duval Street - HMS Dorset had been Duval and Wright's ship. Duval starts an affair with Benson before going back to the fort to find the Spanish currency and leaving Portsmouth on a boat with her.

She ties him up and tries to threaten him into giving her £3 million, but he gets free and shows her an old newspaper which tells of his mother - another Mary Kelly - murdering and dismembering her abusive husband on another Good Friday while Duval hid in the bath. He reveals that he did commit all the murders except that of Harrison (of which Wright was genuinely guilty), that he had placed Tobi's body in ice from a fish-processing plant to manufacture his alibi, and that the older woman had been Woodward, Duval's mother, who had changed her name.

== Cast ==
- James Weber Brown as John Duval
- Indira Varma as Dr. Catherine Benson
- Dervla Kirwan as DI Jane Ambrose
- Hugh Bonneville as Commander William Calthorpe
- Vicki Michelle as Mary Woodward
- Susie Amy as Rosemary Calthorpe
- Alistair Petrie as Lieutenant Charles Carter
- Angela Thorne as Mrs. Garvie
- Nikki Kelly as Harriet Blakeney
- Gary Powell as Wilf Tanner
- Cat Simmons as DC June Francis
- Christopher Villiers as George Barton QC
- Timothy Watson as Henry Wright
- Danny Webb as David Frampton
- Andrew Whipp as DS Pinker
- Simon Williams as Mr. Garvie
- Tom Beard as Mr. Bowles
- Annie Cooper as Tobi Wright
- Elizabeth Healey as Rachel Garvie
- Beth Chalmers as Helen Wilson
- Nathan Hamilton as Johnson
- James Sebastian as Mr. Bowles Jr.

== Release ==
Although the film was originally released as a feature film on 25 September 2015 at the Raindance Film Festival, it was re-edited in 2020 and again re-edited into a three-episode miniseries released in 2020. The episode titles were "The Silent Service", "The Midnight Tide" and "Towards the Sea".
