= Ivor Roberts (actor) =

British actor and a television continuity announcer

Ivor Roberts (19 July 1925 – 5 September 1999) was a British actor and a television continuity announcer who often appeared in comedic roles.

Born in Nottingham, he returned to acting following service in the Royal Navy during the Second World War. Roberts started his television career as a continuity announcer on regional television in Wales, working for TWW before that company lost its franchise in 1968.

Among his better-known roles were the characters of Arnold Thomas in the 1995–97 television series Oh, Doctor Beeching! and Mr Barnes in the second, third and fourth series of You Rang, M'Lord?. He also made a guest appearance, as a police officer, in one episode of George and Mildred. Another notable appearance was as Mr. Chick in Dombey and Son. He played parts in Porridge and Yes Minister. Roberts died in Cardiff, Wales, in 1999, at the age of 74.

== Selected filmography ==
Year	Title	Role	Notes
1975	Madame Bovary	Guillaumin	TV series
1976	Rogue Male	Mr. Drake	TV film
1977	The Duchess of Duke Street	Sergeant	Episode: "The Reluctant Warrior"
1977	Secret Army	Victor	Episodes: "Lost Sheep" and "Guilt" (flashback only)
1978	The Sailor's Return	Farmer Molton	
1979	Home Before Midnight	Inspector Gray	
1980	Leave it to Charlie	Police Inspector	Episode: "The Trouble with Harry"
1980	Sweet William	Uncle Walter	
1980	Hopscotch	Ludlum	
1983	Every Picture Tells a Story	Reverend Jenkins	
1984	Strangers and Brothers	Mr. Eden	Episode: #1
1984	Another Country	Chief Judge	
1987	Personal Services	Glossop	
1988	We Think the World of You	Harry	
1988	Without a Clue	Reporter #3	
1988	Tales of the Unexpected	Gas Inspector	"A Time to Die" episode (9/9)
1995–1997	Oh, Doctor Beeching!	Arnold Thomas	20 episodes
1999	The Window Bed	Joe	(final film role)
