= Felix Bowness =

English actor (1922–2009)

- Born: Felix Hervè Talbot Bowness; 30 March 1922; Harwell, Berkshire, England
- Died: 13 September 2009 (aged 87); Woodley, Berkshire, England
- Occupations: Boxer, soldier, comedian, actor
- Spouse: Mavis Dungey (m. 1950)
- Children: 1

Felix Hervè Talbot Bowness (30 March 1922 – 13 September 2009) was a British comedy actor who was best remembered for his portrayal of the jockey Fred Quilley in the BBC sitcom Hi-de-Hi!.

== Biography ==
Born in the village of Harwell, Berkshire (now Oxfordshire), to French Canadian parents, he became a bantamweight boxing champion.

=== Second World War ===
At the outbreak of the Second World War, he joined the Royal Berkshire Regiment as a signalman. At the D-Day landings in Normandy, after his landing craft was hit and sunk, he only remembered waking in a French convent. During recovery he attended a Vera Lynn concert, after which she gave him a singing lesson.

=== Performing career ===
Bowness returned to Britain and started performing on the comedy circuit, undertaking two summer seasons at Clacton-on-Sea Pier in 1948 and 1949.

He eventually broke into films and television in the early 1960s, and supplemented his income by becoming a well used warm-up act for television shows including Morecambe and Wise, Home To Roost, The Two Ronnies and later Terry Wogan's chat show Wogan and Noel's House Party. He was also the warm-up act for This Is Your Life and became the subject of it in 1985.

Bowness did not come to mainstream public attention until he was picked up by the writing partnership of Jimmy Perry and David Croft. He was cast as former jockey Fred Quilley in the sitcom Hi-de-Hi! and appeared in all 58 episodes. He subsequently appeared with the same ensemble cast in You Rang, M'Lord? and Oh, Doctor Beeching!. During his career he also had credits in such comedy series as The Benny Hill Show, The Liver Birds, The Goodies, Dad's Army, Porridge, Sykes, Till Death Us Do Part and Are You Being Served?.

Bowness was not known for cinematic roles, but in 1979 he appeared in the soft-porn film Queen of the Blues starring Mary Millington and Milton Reid.

=== Personal life and death ===
Bowness and Mavis, his wife of 59 years, lived in Earley, Caversham and then Woodley, all in Berkshire. Bowness retired from acting in 2003 after being diagnosed with dementia.

Bowness passed away peacefully on September 13, 2009 at his home in Woodley, Berkshire. He was survived by his wife Mavis, a son, three grandchildren, and one great-grandchild.

== Television roles ==
Year	Title	Role
1978 to 1979	Leave it to Charlie	Newsreader (voice), George, Mechanical Voice, Politician's Voice
1980 to 1988	Hi-de-Hi!	Fred Quilley
1981	Shillingbury Tales ('The Shillingbury Daydream', episode)	Drunken Austin Allegro driver
1990 to 1993	You Rang, M'Lord?	Mr Pearson
1996 to 1997	Oh, Doctor Beeching!	Bernie Bleasdale
1991 to 1999	Noel's House Party	Himself. Warm Up Act. Burt the bugler.
