= Gail Louw =

British playwright (born 1951)

Gail Louw (born 13 October 1951) is a South African-born British playwright. She is known for the wide-ranging topics of her plays, though a central feature running through most of them is the focus on flawed characters in both ordinary and extraordinary circumstances. She is particularly well known for Blonde Poison which has had eight productions worldwide, including at the Sydney Opera House. In 2023 three of her plays were performed at the Edinburgh Festival Fringe. Four of Louw's plays were presented as a Gail Louw Season at The Playground Theatre, London, from February 27, 2024, to April 6, 2024.

== Early life ==
Louw was born in Johannesburg to a middle class Jewish family. Her father, Maish Levy, was a first generation Jew from Lithuanian parents, her mother, Ruth Levy (née Wallach) was born in Berlin in 1924. Ruth managed to get a student visa to Tel Aviv in April 1939. Her parents were deported to Minsk and were killed by the Nazis in 1942. Ruth and her sister Gila were told by the Red Cross at the end of the war that their parents had survived and were living in America. On the following day, they received a phone call to tell them that their parents had in fact been killed. Ruth lived in Israel until she met Maish who was volunteering at the time in the 1948 Arab-Israeli War. They returned to South Africa in 1948 for the birth of their son.

Louw left South Africa to live in Israel after finishing school at 17. She was one of the first students on the Mount Scopus campus in Jerusalem. Louw moved to Brighton in the UK in 1976. After a variety of jobs, she received a PhD in Organisational informatics in the NHS at the University of Brighton in 1994. After a training fellowship at the Institute of Child Health in Systematic Reviews, she began teaching at the University of Brighton and became the Programme Leader in Public Health at the Institute of Postgraduate Medicine.

== Career in theatre ==
Louw undertook a Postgraduate Diploma and later an MA in Dramatic Writing at the University of Sussex in 2000. With the support of New Writing South she was taken under the wing of Tony Milner from New Vic Productions who produced and directed many of her early plays.

A Gail Louw Season was presented at The Playground Theatre, London, between February and April 2024. Four plays comprised the season including three new ones: Storming!, Rika's Rooms, and The Girl In The Green Jumper.

=== Plays with Jewish themes ===
Her earliest plays all dealt with Jewish themes particularly related to her mother. Two Sisters, a semi-biographical retelling of the relationship of her mother and aunt, is set on a kibbutz in Israel. The play has had three different productions; two in the UK, one of which was directed by Louw, and one in Los Angeles, directed by Stewart Zully for Theatre 40. It has been translated into Hebrew by Roy Horovitz. Other early plays on a Jewish theme include Herschel, based on the story of Herschel Grynszpan, who killed a top Nazi official in 1938 and precipitated Kristallnacht; Killing Faith, her first produced play; and Steps Out Of Time, originally called Shabat in Zfat. Her most performed play, Blonde Poison, is discussed below. A later play, Eishes Chayill - Woman of Valour, returns to the Jewish theme by using music to explore marriage, feminism and frustration in a Haredi community.

Although not a Jewish play, Joe Ho Ho is a four-hander which looks at sexual frustration, fantasy and the commitment a daughter feels for her mother. In this case the mother has Alzheimer's; Louw used much of her experience caring for her own mother who suffered with Alzheimer's in later life.

=== Political plays ===
Duwayne had a tagline - "He survived Stephen Lawrence's killers: Can he survive the Metropolitan Police?" The play portrays the experience Duwayne Brooks received at the hands of the Metropolitan Police. It won Best New Play at Brighton Festival in 2014.

The Ice Cream Boys is based on a fictionalised meeting between Jacob Zuma and Ronnie Kasrils. The play was performed at Jermyn Street Theatre, London in October 2019.

The Only White, is a play about John Harris, the only white person to be executed for political activities in apartheid South Africa, and the role of Peter Hain and his parents Ad and Wal. The play ran for three weeks at the Chelsea Theatre, London in 2023.

=== Monologues ===
Louw is known for her monologues. All her monologues as based on the principle that the protagonist must be talking to someone, or several people, or people who change, or him/herself, but they are not talking to the audience. Three of her most far-reaching plays are monologues: Blonde Poison, Shackleton’s Carpenter, and "...And This is My Friend Mr Laurel". The latter was commissioned by Jeffrey Holland who has performed the role in the UK and Ireland, as well as on cruise ships, for a number of years. He has taken the play to the Edinburgh Festival Fringe for four years, including in 2023.

Blonde Poison has had eight productions worldwide, all with different actresses playing Stella Goldschlag: a UK-based one with Elizabeth Counsell; Salome Jens at Theatre 40, Beverly Hills; Carole Adams Fritsche at Verona Studio, Salem; Belinda Giblin at the Sydney Opera House and MTC, Melbourne; Fiona Ramsay at Theatre on the Square, Johannesburg; Elizabeth Hawthorne in Auckland, New Zealand; Loureline Snedeker in Boca Raton, Florida; and Dulcie Smart in Berlin, Germany. Several of the actors were nominated and won prizes for their performances.

Shackleton's Carpenter has been widely performed for many years by Malcolm Rennie. Following a three-week run at Jermyn Street Theatre in August 2019 Rennie was nominated for the Offie for "Best Male Performance in a play". He has toured the play several times throughout the UK and Ireland and has given over 100 performances including at Chichester Festival Theatre. He performed the play on the Cunard Line's Queen Mary 2 in 2022. Louw also directed playwrighting workshops on the crossing. In 2020 the play was given as a dramatized reading with Peter FitzSimons for six nights at the Australian National Maritime Museum in Sydney.

The Mitfords is a one-woman play where four of the Mitford sisters are represented: Jessica, Diana, Unity, and Nancy. The play featured Heather Long and was sold out for its entire run in 2018. A new production with Emma Wilkinson Wright was performed at the Edinburgh Festival Fringe in 2023.

Larkin Descending is a one-man play about the poet Philip Larkin in his older days, talking to Monica Jones. Graham White played Larkin in 2018 and had a role in developing the play.

Being Brahms won a Surrey and Sussex Radio award as best play of the year. It featured Andrew Wheaton as Anton/Brahms and is based on a real story by Paul Humpoletz.

The Good Dad (A Love Story) is based on a true story from the 1980s. It is a one-woman play with three roles: the actress plays the protagonist, her mother, and her twin. The play is based on a young woman who is sexually abused by her father, but who ends up living and having several children with him. The lack of conflict and anger in the household contributes to a culture of silence and acceptance. In addition, he is seen as a good dad, who looks after all the members of both his families, providing love and care. His tricky heart results in the status quo continuing, until he begins to take an interest in the next generation. The production had several runs in London and at the Edinburgh Festival Fringe in 2023, all featuring Sarah Lawrie. It was nominated for three 2023 Offies and an OffFest Award for the Edinburgh run. The play also had a South African production, both in English and Afrikaans (Die Goeie Pa). The actress Erika Breytenbach-Marais was nominated for a Fleur du Cap award for her performance. The play is still regularly performed, particularly at festivals.

=== Plays based on real people ===
Miss Dietrich Regrets is based on the last months of Marlene Dietrich's life as she lies in her bed in her Paris apartment. It is a two-hander with her daughter, Maria Riva, and explores the conflict between them. It is a revealing and poignant look at the aging Marlene battling with her daughter to retain her independence to the very end. There have been three productions of the play. The original production in 2015 was with Elizabeth Counsell and Moira Brooker. The South African production won a Naledi Theatre Award for Fiona Ramsay as Best Lead Performance in a Play (Female). A Czech production Miss Dietrich Lituje was extremely successful in Prague and has had repeated runs since 2017.

The Witness is a play about the great Yiddish poet Avraham Sutzkever. It was written with Hadas Kalderon, Sutzkever's granddaughter, and was translated by her into Hebrew. It was part of the prestigious Theatronetto theater festival in 2022, and won the Tarin Shelfi Audience Award.

The Girl In The Green Jumper is based on the life of artist Cyril Mann and his wife Renske Mann, who was twenty years his junior.

Rika’s Rooms was adapted into a play by Louw in 2024, based on her novel, with Emma Wilkinson Wright as Rika, both young and old.

The Ice Cream Boys and Duwayne, discussed above in Political Plays, are both based on well known people.

Blonde Poison, "...And This is my friend Mr Laurel", The Mitfords, Larkin Descending, and Shackleton's Carpenter, discussed above under Monologues, are all based on real people, some well known.

=== Plays based on real events ===
A Life Twice Given is based on the first part of the David Daniel's book of the same name. Part of the story relates to real events (the death of his child) and part to a fictional development (cloning the dead child).

Storming! is based on the true events of the 1998 United States Capitol storming by Russell Weston. The ethical issues of enforced medicating of patients with schizophrenia is at the centre of the play. There was a rehearsed reading at Jermyn Street Theatre in 2022.

The Good Dad (A Love Story), discussed above under Monologues, is based on a real event.

The Only White, discussed above under Political plays, is based on a real event.

=== LGBT plays ===
The Half-Life of Love was produced in the UK in 2016 with an all male cast, and in 2017 at the Verona Studio, Salem, with two women and a man. Junot Diaz said "The half-life of love is forever. It remains toxic, poisoning life long after love is over."

=== Produced Plays ===
- Killing Faith (2008)
- Two Sisters (2010, 2016, 2017)
- Joe Ho Ho (2010)
- Blonde Poison (2011, 2014, 2015, 2016, 2017, 2018, 2019, 2019, 2020, 2024)
- Miss Dietrich Regrets (2015, 2015, 2017, 2018, 2019, 2022, 2023)
- Duwayne (2014)
- "...And This Is My Friend Mr Laurel" (2012–2023)
- Shackleton’s Carpenter (2014, 2015, 2018, 2019, 2023)
- The Half-Life of Love (2016, 2017)
- The Mitfords (2017, 2023)
- Larkin Descending (2018)
- Being Brahms (2019)
- A Life Twice Given (2019)
- The Ice Cream Boys (2019)
- The Good Dad (A Love Story) (2020, 2021, 2022, 2023)
- The Witness (2022)
- The Only White (2023)
- Storming! (2024)
- Rika's Rooms (2024)
- The Girl In The Green Jumper (2024)

== Books ==
Louw's first novel, Rika’s Rooms, was published by Waterloo Press in 2022. The book is based on her mother's life. Louw explores the experiences of an ordinary woman caught up in intense love and loss during extraordinary times. It moves from Nazi Germany, to Palestine, and on to apartheid South Africa. Rika, the protagonist, inhabits two worlds: the present which, in her state of dementia, makes no sense, and the coherent past, peopled by ghosts.

Oberon Books (part of Bloomsbury Publishing) has published three collections with four plays in each book:

- Gail Louw: Collected Plays (2015)
  - Blonde Poison, Miss Dietrich Regrets, Shackleton’s Carpenter, Two Sisters
- Gail Louw: Plays Two (2018)
  - Duwayne, The Mitfords, The Half-Life of Love, Joe Ho Ho
- Gail Louw: Plays Three (2019)
  - The Ice Cream Boys, Being Brahms, A Life Twice Given, Killing Faith
- Blonde Poison (2013) ISBN 9781-849434157
- The Ice Cream Boys (2019) ISBN 9781-786829405
- The Good Dad (A Love Story) (2023) (Methuen)
- The Only White (Gail Louw Series of Plays)
- Herschel (Gail Louw Series of Plays)
- Steps Out of Time (Gail Louw Series of Plays)
- Camera Obscura (Gail Louw Series of Plays)
