= Diane Holland =

British actress (1930–2009)

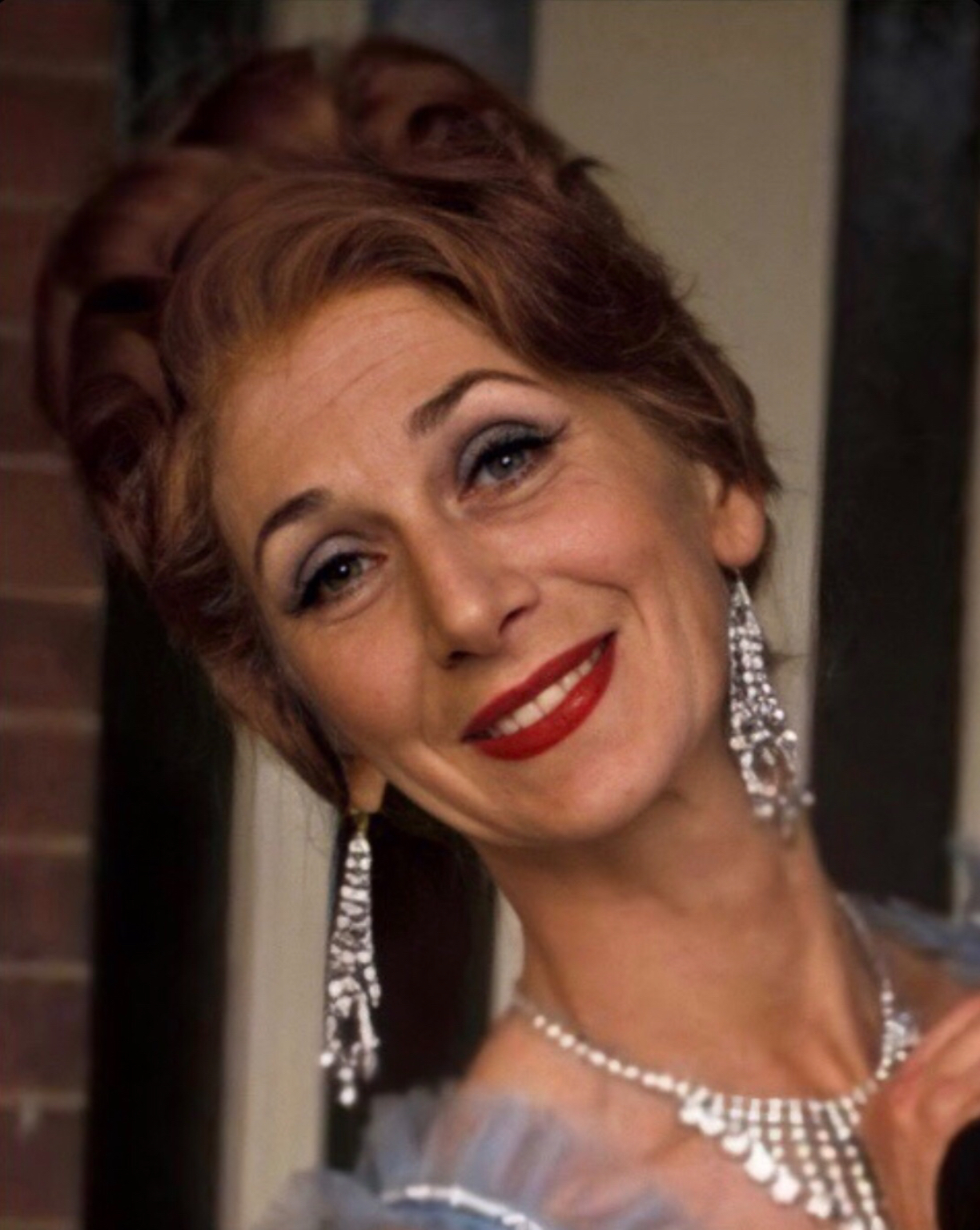
- Diane Holland as Yvonne in Hi-de-Hi!, 1983
- Born: June Diane Neiltje Holland; 28 February 1930; Melbourne, Australia
- Died: 24 January 2009 (aged 78); Godstone, Surrey, England
- Occupations: Dancer and actress
- Years active: 1949–2001
- Relatives: Gillian (Gilda) Perry (sister).

June Diane Neiltje Holland (28 February 1930 – 24 January 2009) known as Diane Holland, was a British actress and dancer best known for playing Yvonne Stuart-Hargreaves in the television sitcom Hi-de-Hi! from 1980 to 1988.

== Early life ==
Holland was born in Melbourne, Australia, and raised in England, where she lived for the rest of her life. She was partly Dutch through her paternal ancestry. On arrival in Britain, the family was hampered by her father's ill-health, the after-effects of having been gassed in the trenches during World War I. During World War II, Holland and her sister Gilda were evacuated with their school (Cone-Ripman) to Loddington Hall, in Leicestershire.

== Career ==
With a love for dance as a young girl, Holland trained as a dancer at the London Cone Ripman (now ArtsEd) and enjoyed success throughout her career on stage. In her youth, Holland earned the role of principal dancer in Sunday Night at the London Palladium shows, and also performed as principal during summer seasons in Monte Carlo and other European casino hotspots as part of an adagio act. She also performed in many West End productions, including Her Excellency (1949), Fancy Free (1951), Rocking the Town (1956), and TV Musical Bonanza! (1957).

Having always enjoyed acting in addition to dance, Holland also appeared in many theatre productions, later turning her attentions to television, playing the recurring role of Sarah Maynard in Crossroads from 1964 to 1970. In the late 1960s she also received critical acclaim for her performance as Miss Amelia in the European premiere of The Ballad of the Sad Cafe, alongside Skip Martin. During the 1970s, she frequently worked alongside comedian Eric Sykes in Big Bad Mouse (1972) Sykes and TV film The Likes of Sykes (1980). At the peak of Hi-de-Hi! in the 1980s, Holland received letters from British troops in the Falklands, with the BBC press office stating that she had become a "Forces' sweetheart", although she claimed this was a "slight exaggeration" and that it "just snowballed".

Later in her career, Holland became best known as ballroom dancer Yvonne Stuart-Hargreaves in Hi-de-Hi! (1980). Jimmy Perry, who co-wrote Hi-De-Hi!, had married Holland's sister Gilda, and saw Holland's talent after she appeared in pantomimes and plays at The Watford Palace, which he and Gilda managed together. By the time Hi-De-Hi! came into production, Holland was suffering from serious arthritis in her hip, a common plight for dancers, and the show's choreographer noted how she would arrive for rehearsals "limping badly" but during filming she "hid it very well". Holland did not appear in the summer theatre shows of Hi-De-Hi! partly due to this, and also being keen not to be too heavily associated with one character. Prior to Hi-De-Hi!, Holland appeared in Tales of the Unexpected in the episode named "The Stinker", and Stig of the Dump as Mrs Fawkham-Greene. She also appeared in Some Mothers Do 'Ave 'Em as a maternity hospital receptionist. She played Miss Lavant in the TV film The Children of Dynmouth (1987), and Madame Dupree in Lace 2 (1985).

Following the end of Hi-de-Hi! in 1988, she appeared in Central Television's comedy The Upper Hand, and in an episode of Bergerac as a music teacher. In 1992–93, she played the notorious female magistrate, Celia Littlewood, who had eyes for Miss Brahms, in Grace and Favour, the sequel to Are You Being Served.

One of her last appearances was in one of her favourite roles as maiden aunt in The Nutcracker in The Royal Ballet, Covent Garden, a role she had danced for over 20 years, from 1984 to 2008. She also had a role as a terminally ill patient in Casualty in 2001.

== Death ==
Holland lived quietly in the village of Godstone, Surrey, where she died at home on 24 January 2009 at the age of 78 after contracting bronchial pneumonia. She never married or had children, and while a private person, her obituaries frequently note her being "extremely kind-hearted" and her "very dry sense of humour". Holland's agent stated that she was "a real trouper", "a joy to look after", and "extremely hard-working". The news of her death was not made public until more than three weeks later. She was survived by her younger sister, Gillian (Gilda) Perry, a former dancer, actress and theatre manager.
