= Barry Howard =

Actor

- Born: Barry Frederick Howard; 9 July 1937; Nottingham, England
- Died: 28 April 2016 (aged 78); Poole, Dorset, England
- Occupation: Actor

Barry Frederick Howard (9 July 1937 – 28 April 2016) was an English actor. He was best known for his role as Barry Stuart-Hargreaves in the first seven series of the long-running BBC sitcom Hi-de-Hi!.

== Life and career ==
Howard was born in Nottingham. While completing his national service in the Royal Navy, Howard found himself wanting to train for the theatre at the Birmingham Theatre School. Unable to gain a grant from the local authority, he worked for almost two years at the Alexandra Theatre in a backstage role to fund his place at drama school.

Howard appeared in Terry and June, You Rang, M'Lord?, The House of Windsor and Dad, in addition to Hi-de-Hi! In 2004, Howard played the character of Geoffrey in the short film Open Casket. In November 2009, he appeared in an episode of the BBC comedy Beautiful People. Howard appeared in Doctor Who, in its 2009 two-part Christmas special, as driver of the mini-bus containing the old age pensioners' group seeking the Doctor.

In 2012, Howard appeared in the fifth series of the BBC Radio 4 comedy Fags, Mags and Bags as Frank Butcher. In 2015, he provided the voice of the lead character in ITV's sitcom Mr Snufflesworth, a live action comedy starring a dachshund dog who lives in South London.

Howard was also a stage actor, and was half of one of the most celebrated Ugly Sister acts in pantomime regularly appearing opposite John Inman.

== Death ==
Howard died from blood cancer, aged 78, on 28 April 2016, at his home in Poole, Dorset.

== Television roles ==
- Ghost Squad as bartender
- You Must Be Joking! as car salesman
- His Favourite Family
- The ITV Play as Ugly Sister
- Terry and June as Cochran's
- Hi-de-Hi! as Barry Stuart-Hargreaves
- You Rang, M'Lord? as Count Zarkhov
- The House of Windsor as Danny Jackson
- Dad as Mr Nigel
- Open Casket as Geoffrey
- Beautiful People as Monsieur Antoine
- Doctor Who as Oliver Barnes
