= List of You Rang, M'Lord? episodes =

The following is a list of episodes for the British situation comedy You Rang, M'Lord? that aired from 1988 to 1993. All episodes were approximately 50 minutes long.

== Series overview ==
Series	Episodes	Originally released	
Series	Episodes	First released	Last released
Pilot		29 December 1988	
1	5	14 January 1990	11 February 1990
2	7	11 November 1990	23 December 1990
3	7	10 November 1991	22 December 1991
4	6	20 March 1993	24 April 1993

== Episodes ==
=== Pilot (1988) ===
No.	Title	Directed by	Written by	Original release date
1	"Pilot"	David Croft	Jimmy Perry & David Croft	29 December 1988
London, 1927: Alf Stokes and his daughter Ivy are given the sack from their jobs on the music halls. Alf decides that he has no option but to re-enter service as a butler. When he arrives at the residence of Lord Meldrum, some familiar faces await him. Repeated 7 January 1990 and 5 April 1991 (a 50-minute edited version was used for both repeats and the DVD release.).

=== Series 1 (1990) ===
No. overall	No. in series	Title	Directed by	Written by	Original release date
2	1	"The Phantom Sign Writer"	David Croft	Jimmy Perry & David Croft	14 January 1990
Alf and Ivy are settled into their new jobs but things soon hot up when Sir Ralph suspects that his wife, Lady Agatha, is having an affair. Lord Meldrum's car is vandalised – someone has daubed the word "fornicator" on the side which causes a panic when the Bishop wants to use the vehicle. Repeated 12 April 1991
3	2	"A Deed of Gift"	David Croft	Jimmy Perry & David Croft	21 January 1990
Lady Lavender sends for her solicitor whom she instructs to give Ivy her shares from the Union Jack Rubber Company. James is tortured by thoughts of Miss Poppy after she asks to feel his muscles. Then Lavender sends for her solicitor again. Repeated 19 April 1991
4	3	"Love and Money"	David Croft	Jimmy Perry & David Croft	28 January 1990
Lord Meldrum thinks that Lavender has gone too far and wants her declared mentally unstable, whilst Teddy is determined to pay Ivy a visit in her room no matter how dangerous the route. A party, thrown for Miss Cissy's birthday, brings a few surprises. Repeated 26 April 1991
5	4	"Fair Shares"	David Croft	Jimmy Perry & David Croft	4 February 1990
Lady Lavender has now promised her shares to Stokes, and he sees this as a chance to set himself up for life. Meanwhile, Ivy is in trouble for telling Sir Ralph about his wife's indiscretions with Lord Meldrum. Repeated 3 May 1991
6	5	"Beg, Borrow or Steal"	David Croft	Jimmy Perry & David Croft	11 February 1990
Alf is being blackmailed by the local pawn broker into letting him burgle the house. Lord Meldrum allows Cissy & Poppy to hold an evening of progressive poetry in the dining room. At last the relationship between Alf and Ivy is revealed to James. Repeated 10 May 1991

=== Series 2 (1990) ===
No. overall	No. in series	Title	Directed by	Written by	Original release date
7	1	"Labour or Love"	David Croft	Jimmy Perry & David Croft	11 November 1990
Lord Meldrum gives Teddy an ultimatum – marry Madge Cartwright or be sent to work in his factory. Teddy thinks it's a bluff but finds that his brother means every word. Alf discovers that Lady Lavender has got some money stashed under her bed and schemes to relieve her of the burden.
8	2	"Trouble at Mill"	David Croft	Jimmy Perry & David Croft	18 November 1990
The Prime Minister is coming to dinner but Alf's thoughts are consumed by Lady Lavender. At the factory, Teddy's flirtations with the factory girls causes a mass walk out.
9	3	"Money Talks"	David Croft	Jimmy Perry & David Croft	25 November 1990
Lady Lavender throws her money out of the window and into the street, naturally some of the money goes astray when Alf gets his hands on it.
10	4	"The Meldrum Vases"	David Croft	Jimmy Perry & David Croft	2 December 1990
Alf has hidden some of the money in one of his Lordship's antique vases – unfortunately Lord Meldrum has donated three identical vases to the Bishop's auction for Distressed Gentlewomen. James and Ivy are in a race to stop Alf retrieving the money.
11	5	"The Wounds of War"	David Croft and Roy Gould	Jimmy Perry & David Croft	9 December 1990
To protect his master, Alf tells Sir Ralph that Lord Meldrum was wounded in the Artillery. Ivy is over the moon when James agrees to take her to the pictures. Mrs Lipton is convinced that Alf's divorce is being held up by his wife.
12	6	"Stranger in the Night"	David Croft	Jimmy Perry & David Croft	16 December 1990
James is embarrassed when his father arrives at the house on the run from the police. The servants decide to hide him until they can arrange for him to flee the country.
13	7	"Royal Flush"	David Croft	Jimmy Perry & David Croft	23 December 1990
Excitement runs through the household when it is announced that the deposed King and Queen of Dalmatia are coming to dinner, although Mrs Lipton is upset to find that she will not be doing the catering. In addition, Noël Coward (Guy Siner) is expected to join them after the opening night of his new play.

=== Series 3 (1991) ===
No. overall	No. in series	Title	Directed by	Written by	Original release date
14	1	"Please Help the Orphans"	Roy Gould	Jimmy Perry & David Croft	10 November 1991
Alf is being pestered by Mrs Lipton to finalise his divorce so he gets an old friend to agree to pose as Mrs Stokes. Meanwhile, he has a brainwave to make some money by fooling Mrs Lipton into baking some cakes, which she thinks are destined for the local orphanage.
15	2	"Current Affairs"	Roy Gould	Jimmy Perry & David Croft	17 November 1991
Alf continues to supply the Sunshine Pantry with Mrs Lipton's cakes. Myrtle pays a visit to the house posing as Mrs Stokes, but can she persuade Mrs Lipton?
16	3	"Mrs Lipton's Nasty Turn"	Roy Gould	Jimmy Perry & David Croft	24 November 1991
Having discovered Alf's deception and broken his Lordship's crockery in a fit of anger, Mrs Lipton is left wondering if she still has a job. On a visit to the Sunshine Pantry, Ivy discovers the truth about Mrs. Lipton's cherry cake. Lord Meldrum is shocked to discover Cissy intends to stand for local government, as a candidate for the United Workers Party.
17	4	"Meet the Workers"	Roy Gould	Jimmy Perry & David Croft	1 December 1991
Poppy announces her engagement to Dickie Metcalfe but Alf smells a rat! Lord Meldrum is convinced that he must learn more about the lower classes before he can join the board of governors at the BBC and so he invites his factory workers to dinner and serves them fish and chips. Meanwhile, Lady Lavender invites the staff to the wedding of her parrot!
18	5	"Gretna Green or Bust"	Roy Gould	Jimmy Perry & David Croft	8 December 1991
Miss Poppy and Dickie Metcalfe decide to marry and elope to Gretna Green, and Teddy and Rose take the idea and elope too: however, Lady Lavender has hidden in the back of the car, and the rest of the household set off in hot pursuit in an attempt to stop them.
19	6	"The Night of Reckoning"	Roy Gould	Jimmy Perry & David Croft	15 December 1991
Twelvetrees gets an offer to be butler for Sir Ralph and Lady Agatha. Mabel is on the verge of being evicted from her home. Meanwhile, Alf comes up with a drastic solution to Teddy's problem. Cissy finds out whether or not she has been elected onto the local council.
20	7	"A Day in the Country"	Roy Gould	Jimmy Perry & David Croft	22 December 1991
Lord Meldrum decides he is going to treat the servants to a picnic in the country. Nobody is surprised however, that upon their arrival at Peabody Hall, Sir Ralph and Lady Agatha are there too.

=== Series 4 (1993) ===
No. overall	No. in series	Title	Directed by	Written by	Original release date
21	1	"Yes Sir, That's My Baby"	Roy Gould	Jimmy Perry & David Croft	20 March 1993
Cissy leads the house into helping out at the local soup kitchen for the poor. Meanwhile, Teddy is still trying to escape the romantic clutches of Madge Cartwright. This time, Alf thinks he has the perfect solution – he traces all of Teddy's illegitimate children and brings them to the house to face Madge.
22	2	"Requiem for a Parrot"	Roy Gould	Jimmy Perry & David Croft	27 March 1993
Lord Meldrum is intent on sending Teddy to his rubber plantation in Malaya, however the death of Lady Lavender's parrot leads to some bizarre funeral arrangements.
23	3	"Come to the Ball"	Roy Gould	Jimmy Perry & David Croft	3 April 1993
Lord Meldrum decides to inspect the servants' quarters and Mabel has found a purse containing five pounds. Then the staff are invited to the luxurious ball where the employers have to wait upon their servants.
24	4	"The Truth Revealed"	Roy Gould	Jimmy Perry & David Croft	10 April 1993
Sir Ralph sacks Selfridge, his butler, who in turn tells him of his wife's long-standing affair with George Meldrum. Sir Ralph sets out for revenge and the staff have to ensure that a mysterious "accident" doesn't befall their master.
25	5	"Fall of the House of Meldrum"	Roy Gould	Jimmy Perry & David Croft	17 April 1993
Meldrum is convinced that Sir Ralph has put a curse on him. In addition, the rubber plantation in Malaya has been ravaged by the Bangokhan beetle. The family face financial ruin.
26	6	"Well, There You Are Then...!"	Roy Gould	Jimmy Perry & David Croft	24 April 1993
Things look bleak for the Meldrums with most of their money lost on the stock market crash and the effects of the Bangokhan beetle. Cissy and Lavender try to save the situation, but the servants have little choice but to look elsewhere for their future.
