= List of Hi-de-Hi! episodes =

This is an episode list for the BBC television sitcom Hi-de-Hi! by Jimmy Perry and David Croft broadcast between 1 January 1980 and 30 January 1988.

== Series overview ==
| Series | Episodes | Originally released | |
| Series | Episodes | First released | Last released |
|---|---|---|---|
| Pilot | | 1 January 1980 | |
| 1 | 6 | 26 February 1981 | 2 April 1981 |
| 2 | 6 | 29 November 1981 | 3 January 1982 |
| 3 | 6 | 31 October 1982 | 5 December 1982 |
| 4 | 7 | 12 December 1982 | 22 January 1983 |
| 5 | 7 | 27 November 1983 | 22 January 1984 |
| 6 | 6 | 3 November 1984 | 25 December 1984 |
| 7 | 7 | 25 December 1985 | 16 February 1986 |
| 8 | 6 | 8 November 1986 | 27 December 1986 |
| 9 | 6 | 26 December 1987 | 30 January 1988 |

== Episodes ==
=== Pilot (1980) ===
| No. | Title | Directed by | Original release date |
|---|---|---|---|
| 0 | "Hey Diddle Diddle" | David Croft | 1 January 1980 |
In 1959, Jeffrey Fairbrother, a professor at Cambridge University's archaeology department, has grown tired of academic life and decides to apply as the new entertainment manager for Maplin's Essex holiday camp. Whilst his family are deeply concerned, Fairbrother begins to question his move as he has a run-in with the camp's host, Ted Bovis, who is eager to keep swindling campers despite being placed in charge of the camp's new comic, Spike Dixon. But a chance meeting with some train passengers swiftly reveals that the new manager might make it after all. Note: The first of two appearances of original cast member Richard Cottan as Wilf Green (aka Marty Storm). Note: The original broadcast of the pilot had a runtime of 40 minutes, as does the UK DVD release. It was repeated on 19th February 1981, the week before Series 1 began its original broadcast, edited down to 35 minutes.

=== Series 1 (1981) ===
| No. | Title | Directed by | Original release date |
|---|---|---|---|
| 1 | "Desire in the Mickey Mouse Grotto" | David Croft | 26 February 1981 |
Fairbrother is shocked when rumours circulate that he took a teenage camper back to his assigned employee chalet, even though it was Ted dating them. Gladys Pugh, the camp's radio operator and sports organizer, who happens to have fallen for him, is intent on rooting out the truth, especially as the girl involved in the rumours has very protective parents. Note: The second of two appearances of original cast member Richard Cottan as Wilf Green (aka Marty Storm).
| 2 | "The Beauty Queen Affair" | David Croft | 5 March 1981 |
Fairbrother is suspicious that Ted has been conducting scams on campers after discovering irregularities in the takings from the camp's bingo sessions. He thus becomes adamant that Ted must not conduct himself in this manner, but is placed in an awkward situation when a camper offers to bribe him so that his daughter wins a contest, even though she wins without any assistance.
| 3 | "The Partridge Season" | John Kilby | 12 March 1981 |
Children's entertainer William Partridge lands himself in trouble after he hits some of the campers' children for annoying him. Fairbrother, believing he can mend his ways, decides to give him a second chance with an advance on his wages. But he soon regrets it when Fred Quilley, the camp's riding instructor, reveals he spent the money on alcohol and locked himself in their chalet.
| 4 | "The Day of Reckoning" | John Kilby | 19 March 1981 |
Fred is horrified when a honeymooning couple identify themselves as associates of a crime boss he unintentionally ruined. The other staff are shocked when they learn Fred was bribed to fix a race but ended up winning it. Ted decides the group should help their friend out, unaware that the couple in question are actually there to rob the campers and are surprised when the staff offer them a deal.
| 5 | "Charity Begins at Home" | John Kilby | 26 March 1981 |
Ted decides to conduct another scam to extract money from the campers, but his new plan doesn't quite stay on track as something goes wrong in the process. Meanwhile, Fairbrother is delighted to see some old faces visit Maplins, but deeply shocked to learn they lost all their money they saved up for a trip to see family in Canada.
| 6 | "No Dogs Allowed" | John Kilby | 2 April 1981 |
Fairbrother is placed in an awkward position, when his estranged wife, seeking a divorce, asks him to look after their pet sheepdog. Because of the camp's "no pets" policy, he is forced to hide it away, but matters are complicated when Gladys thinks he is seeing someone, and a private detective sent by Fairbrother's wife comes snooping around the place.

=== Series 2 (1981–1982) ===
| No. | Title | Directed by | Original release date |
|---|---|---|---|
| 7 | "If Wet – In the Ballroom" | John Kilby | 29 November 1981 |
Maplins is faced with a spate of bad weather, with the rain ruining the usual entertainment for the campers' children. The matter is not made any better when Partridge hits a child, causing Fairbrother to agree to their parents to rig a singing contest in their favour. For Ted, it's not good, as he rigged it for another parent, forcing him to come up with a plan to ensure everyone comes out happy.
| 8 | "Peggy's Big Chance" | John Kilby | 6 December 1981 |
Fairbrother receives word that he is to expect a visitor from Maplin's Head Office in London. With Peggy dreaming of becoming a Yellowcoat, he decides to arrange her to face an interview with them. For the meantime, Ted decides to see if she can prove she can be fun with a role as a shark from a piece of entertainment at the pool, but it doesn't go well.
| 9 | "Lift Up Your Minds" | John Kilby | 13 December 1981 |
Convinced that Maplins should give campers a chance to appreciate more intellectual entertainment, Fairbrother decides to conduct lunchtime record recitals. But Ted is convinced that it's an idea that won't work. He is soon proven right when a trial run flops, but soon sees an opportunity to improve the idea in a way that wasn't envisioned.
| 10 | "On With the Motley" | John Kilby | 20 December 1981 |
Ted is shocked when his agent contacts him with news that a fellow comedian friend of his has fallen ill, and that he has been hired as a late replacement for a performance at a sophisticated club. Ted eagerly sees this as the break he's been waiting for, as does Peggy, who is eager for stardom. But things do not go to plan as they hope.
| 11 | "A Night Not To Remember" | John Kilby | 27 December 1981 |
Gladys is offered a bottle of champagne by an admirer, and decides to share it with Fairbrother. However, this causes problems, as this and a round of beers with a camper lead to him getting drunk and needing Gladys' help back to his chalet. When Barry overhears the commotion they are making, he makes the wrong assumptions regarding the noises they are making.
| 12 | "Sausages or Limelight" | John Kilby | 3 January 1982 |
Spike is delighted when he falls in love with a young woman, but her father, a butcher, is not too keen on his job. He soon faces a dilemma when the father states he will only let them date and potentially marry, if he gives up showbusiness to join his trade. Only Ted and Fairbrother can help him decide what is more important to him.

=== Series 3 (1982) ===
| No. | Title | Directed by | Original release date |
|---|---|---|---|
| 13 | "Nice People With Nice Manners" | John Kilby | 31 October 1982 |
Dance instructors Yvonne and Barry Stuart-Hargreaves are eager to enjoy a tasteful party in their chalet and instruct Peggy to hand out invites to those they prefer to come over. Unfortunately, a distraction with a planned event for the campers causes her to forget to deliver them, leaving Yvonne and Barry getting quite a lot more than they bargained for.
| 14 | "Carnival Time" | David Croft | 7 November 1982 |
As the entertainment staff of Maplin's prepare for their involvement in the annual Crimpton-on-Sea carnival parade, Fairbrother is shocked when the dean of his college turns up. He soon finds himself torn between his life at the holiday camp and an opportunity for a new posting in Cambridge, until an incident leads him to decide on what he wants most. Note: This episode contains an anachronism: the LP seen behind Gladys in the first scene, The Touch of Your Lips by Pat Boone, wasn’t released until 1964, 5 years after this episode is set. Guest stars John Le Mesurier.
| 15 | "A Matter of Conscience" | John Kilby | 14 November 1982 |
The camp's owner, Joe Maplin, relays news to Fairbrother that he must help with his plans to get the local council to given him a plot of land next to the camp, rather than towards a new hospital. Ted knows they must do this, even if the others will be against it, and uses deceit to trick all of them, including Peggy, to comply with Maplin's orders.
| 16 | "The Pay-Off" | John Kilby | 21 November 1982 |
Maplin sends Fairbrother a parcel of money with instructions that it must be used to bribe local councillors, but his reluctance to do so leads to Ted offering to handle the matter - which soon goes wrong. Meanwhile, Fred becomes depressed when one of his favourite horses at the camp becomes sick, and that he will need at least £100 to call in a vet to treat it.
| 17 | "Trouble and Strife" | John Kilby | 28 November 1982 |
Ted is shocked when his ex-wife turns up with a bailiff, officially calling on him to provide the alimony payments that he's failed to pay. With help from Spike and the others, Ted decides to pull his best tricks to raise the needed cash, including tricking campers into believing Peggy's storeroom is their chalet - unless they pay to be put somewhere else.
| 18 | "Stripes" | John Kilby | 5 December 1982 |
Maplin requests that Gladys be made in charge of the other Yellowcoats, whom he is disappointed with. The others soon resent this when she modifies her uniform to show off her new rank. But Gladys soon regrets this, especially when she jumps to conclusions regarding her half-brother; when he arrives at the camp around the same time, there is a Peeping Tom disturbing the female staff and campers. Note: Guest appearance from Talfryn Thomas

=== Series 4 (1982–1983) ===
| No. | Title | Directed by | Original release date |
|---|---|---|---|
| 19 | "Co-Respondent's Course" | John Kilby | 12 December 1982 |
Fairbrother learns his estranged wife, who wants a divorce, has been having an affair with a judge, the Honourable Max Tewkesbury. When he arrives, he asks him to accept her request, but Fairbrother is not eager to do so. While Gladys is disturbed, due to her love for him, neither realise Max's arrival is not what it seems to be. Note: The fourth series was originally aired right after the conclusion of the third series; however, it is listed as its own series, rather than an extension of the previous series.
| 20 | "It's a Blue World" | John Kilby | 19 December 1982 |
Whilst some of the younger entertainment staff make plans to use the camp's cafe after hours for a private party, Ted has plans to use it to showcase some adult films to the male campers that he recently got a hold of. Fairbrother is shocked when he learns of this, especially after Gladys learns the police are arresting anyone involved in the supply and showcasing of the films.
| 21 | "Eruptions" | David Croft | 26 December 1982 |
Ted is put off by a new mechanical volcano exhibit placed in the camp's ballroom, when it ruins his routine for the campers. When Fairbrother refuses to remove it, Ted calls on Fred to tamper with it, roping in Spike and Peggy to assist in the scheme. At the same time, Partridge is facing trouble for his recent drunken hijinx, and so decides to rat out the group for their actions, only to get Fairbrother and Gladys into a bit of a problem. Note: This is a Christmas special and has a runtime of just over 45 minutes.
| 22 | "The Society Entertainer" | John Kilby | 2 January 1983 |
Spike has his head turned when a Scottish widow arrives with her attractive daughter. The resulting impact sees the camp's comic including more "sophisticated" material which is slowly annoying the campers. Ted is soon given the job of bringing Spike to his senses before he effectively ruins his career for the wrong reasons.
| 23 | "Sing You Sinners" | David Croft | 9 January 1983 |
The local vicar announces to Fairbrother that he will no longer lead any further Sunday services at the camp, owing to Maplin's increasingly bizarre suggestions that he cannot abide with. To fix the problem, the Yellowcoats are tasked with trying to fill in the gap, but Ted's proposal creates a rather bizarre Sunday service without the vicar. Note: The plot for this episode features a slight anachronism, in that despite being set in 1959, the Tom Jones song "Delilah" was not written until 1968.
| 24 | "Maplin Intercontinental" | John Kilby | 16 January 1983 |
Maplin informs the staff that he is due to open a new holiday camp in the Bahamas, and is seeking to find the best Yellowcoat staff to send there. Fairbrother decides to arrange for a competition to find the most suitable candidate for the role, delighting Peggy with news she could get her dream to become a Yellowcoat herself, while Gladys eagerly seeks to win the contest on the belief that the manager will go to the Bahamas as well.
| 25 | "All Change" | John Kilby | 23 January 1983 |
Fairbrother has a difficult task ahead when Barry and Yvonne announce they are splitting up following a disagreement. This forces him to rearrange where the staff reside, with Ted and Spike forced to take in Barry, while Gladys is moved in with Yvonne. Meanwhile, Maplin sends his newly appointed Controller of Yellowcoats, Joan Wainwright, to inspect the staff, whom Ted feels he has seen before. Note: This episode contains an anachronism: the LP seen behind Gladys in the first scene, Favourites by Roy Castle, wasn’t released until 1961, 2 years after this episode is set.

=== Series 5 (1983–1984) ===
| No. | Title | Directed by | Original release date |
|---|---|---|---|
| 26 | "Concessions" | John Kilby | 27 November 1983 |
Ted fakes being ill so he and Partridge can sneak out of the camp to perform at a dinner for Crimpton-on-Sea's councilors, bringing along Peggy who is eager to earn some extra money serving meals. Although Fairbrother is shocked about the deception, Peggy manages to prevent them losing their jobs when she overhears something during the dinner that threatens Maplin's interests.
| 27 | "Save Our Heritage" | John Kilby | 4 December 1983 |
Fairbrother is horrified when he learns that Maplin seeks to evict a widow from her cottage by fair means or foul, all in pursuit of acquiring the land she resides on to expand the camp. Eager to prevent this, he swiftly calls on his staff to help him delay Maplin's plans until a heritage group can arrange to protect the cottage from demolition, after he finds it's got history to it.
| 28 | "Empty Saddles" | John Kilby | 11 December 1983 |
Fred is shocked when Maplin announces his intentions to dispose of most of his horses that he deems are no longer suitable for the camp. Depressed greatly, the staff try to do what they can to cheer him up, until Peggy has the bright idea of taking advantage of Maplin's desires to be knighted by giving him an opportunity to look good in the press.
| 29 | "The Marriage Settlement" | John Kilby | 18 December 1983 |
Gladys is surprised when she learns Fairbrother's wife has come to see him, and soon erroneously believes they plan to reconcile, when in reality he has agreed to divorce her. Peggy soon sets the record straight, before revealing that Fairbrother intends to be caught with another woman, so he and his wife can have a quick divorce from each other.
| 30 | "The Graven Image" | John Kilby | 8 January 1984 |
Maplin is installing a statue of himself at each of his holiday camps, and request the staff at the Crimpton-on-Sea camp to oversee a dignified occasion for its unveiling. But Spike causes problems when, while drunk, he accidentally repaints the statue into a clown. Ted is forced to quickly rectify the problem, before the unveiling ceremony. Note: First Appearance of Gavin Richards as Harold Fox
| 31 | "Peggy's Pen Friend" | John Kilby | 15 January 1984 |
Peggy is excited with the news that a pen-friend of hers wants to meet up in person for the first time since they began writing to each other. But the entertainment staff are shocked when they meet them and discover that her friend is a middle-aged man. Everyone, including Gladys, soon fear for her welfare, especially when she receives a proposal from him.
| 32 | "The Epidemic" | John Kilby | 22 January 1984 |
A Chad graffiti craze breaks out at the camp, and Maplin orders the staff to put a stop to it. In the process of trying to help with cleaning it up, Barry suffers a back injury, leading Yvonne to call on a former boyfriend, Julian Dalrymple-Sykes, to help her out in his absence. Meanwhile, the graffiti vandalism proves problematic to such a point, that Ted decides to step in with an ingenious plan to put a stop to it. Note: This marks the final appearance of Simon Cadell following his departure from the show.

=== Series 6 (1984) ===
| No. | Title | Directed by | Original release date |
|---|---|---|---|
| 33 | "Together Again" | David Croft | 3 November 1984 |
It is Spring 1960, and the Entertainment Staff are heading back to Maplins in Crimpton-on-Sea for the new holiday season. But Gladys is shocked when she finds a letter from Fairbrother, revealing he won't be coming back. While she is heartbroken, Ted sees it as an opportunity to potentially take over as entertainment manager.
| 34 | "Ted at the Helm" | David Croft | 10 November 1984 |
Ted looks forward to a visit to Maplins' home office in London in hopes he will become entertainment manager of the camp, as some new Yellowcoat girls turn up to help with the new season. But his dreams are dashed when it transpires Maplin has hired a former RAF pilot, Clive Dempster, to become the new manager. Ted soon takes a sudden distrust to his arrival. Note: This marks the first appearance of David Griffin as Squadron Leader Clive Dempster.
| 35 | "Opening Day" | David Croft | 17 November 1984 |
The first day of the holiday season has arrived, and Clive finds himself facing admiration from some of the women, much to Gladys' dislike, as the staff head for the station to greet the first group of campers they will entertain. But Ted is more distrustful of him, especially as he has borrowed money from him with tricks he uses himself.
| 36 | "Off with the Motley" | David Croft | 24 November 1984 |
Peggy delights in Clive allowing her to join in with the campers' fun, despite Gladys' disapproval of this decision, believing this could bring her closer to becoming a Yellowcoat. Head office is soon willing to help her move along with a rewarding promotion, but not the one she wants as it is in the camp's administration building, which takes her away from the campers and this leaves her feeling quite miserable.
| 37 | "Hey Diddle Diddle, Who's on the Fiddle?" | David Croft | 1 December 1984 |
Peggy accidentally comes across a letter that Clive left in a jacket pocket, which she and Spike read. A mistaken belief in the letter leads then to wrongly assume he is there to spy on the staff and report any of them who are conducting rackets, prompting Spike to shut them down to avoid everyone being fired. Note: Last Appearance of Leslie Dwyer as Mr Partridge due to failing health. His character was written out of the show in Series 7.
| 38 | "Raffles" | David Croft | 25 December 1984 |
Fred requests Ted remove his broken-down car in the stables, where it has languished after he tried selling it before. He soon sees an opportunity to make money from it, as it happens to be the same model and colour as Clive's own car. But unknown to him, Clive has problems, as debt collectors are pursuing him for a debt he thought he didn't have.

=== Series 7 (1985–1986) ===
| No. | Title | Directed by | Original release date |
|---|---|---|---|
| 39 | "The Great Cat Robbery" | David Croft | 25 December 1985 |
Peggy comes across a new story revealing that a famous cat-burglar has recently passed away, a person she recognises as one who stayed at the camp during the previous holiday season. As the police have yet to find his stolen loot, Ted has the idea that it's hidden in one of the chalets, and goes out of his way to keep the campers out of the way whilst he searches them. Note: This is a Christmas special and has a runtime of 58 minutes.
| 40 | "It's Murder" | David Croft | 5 January 1986 |
Partridge's behaviour is becoming increasingly bad, and things take a turn for the worse when some of the campers threaten to harm him after he beats up their children. The entertainment staff are at their wits' end with him, including Fred, Barry and Yvonne. But following a masked ball, Spike and Ted makes an unsettling discovery.
| 41 | "Who Killed Mr Partridge?" | David Croft | 12 January 1986 |
The camp staff are shocked when Spike, Ted and Peggy reveal that Partride is dead, and that they must keep things quiet to avoid Maplin's getting unwelcome trouble. But matters get heated, as accusations fly, a camper unwittingly comes across the body, and the staff bicker about who could have led to this situation they are in.
| 42 | "Spaghetti Galore" | David Croft | 19 January 1986 |
The entertainment staff decide to arrange a surprise party for Gladys, whose birthday is fast approaching. Only Peggy discovers that she has been offered dinner by Clive and Maplin's top man, Harold Fox, and she can't disappoint both. To assist her, Peggy suggests a scheme to avoid sad faces, but Gladys is in for a shock when she learns that everyone seems to have the same plan for her. Note: Last Appearance of Gavin Richards as Harold Fox
| 43 | "A Lack of Punch" | Robin Carr and David Croft | 26 January 1986 |
With Partridge gone, the entertainment staff face problems when the parents expect a Punch-and-Judy show for their children. Maplin soon provides a suggestion to the group, but it involves performances of nursery rhymes for the children, which most of the staff hate. Not happy with this, Ted and Spike chance upon a promising entertainer at the beach, Sammy Morris, and offer him a job at the camp once they clean him up, but things do not go to plan as they hope. Note: First Appearance of Kenneth Connor as Sammy Morris
| 44 | "Ivory Castles in the Air" | Robin Carr and David Croft | 9 February 1986 |
Maplin instructs the camp staff to host a competition amongst them, as part of a corporate sponsorship deal with two different brands. This presents a problem for Spike, when he is paired up with Gladys, rather than his sweetheart April. Meanwhile, Clive is asked for help with his father's estate, but Gladys gets the wrong idea when he requires her to come see his father.
| 45 | "Man Trap" | Robin Carr and David Croft | 16 February 1986 |
In the aftermath of the competition, Spike and Gladys are horrified when he takes advantage of their win to get some publicity for his business, by claiming both are to be engaged. As both try to figure out what to do, Peggy is shocked when she learns the truth behind Gladys visit to Clive's father, prompting Ted to convince him to do the right thing. Note: This marks the final appearance of Barry Howard as Barry Stuart-Hargreaves, his contract being terminated over some dispute with the producers.

=== Series 8 (1986) ===
| No. | Title | Directed by | Original release date |
|---|---|---|---|
| 46 | "Pigs Might Fly" | Robin Carr and David Croft | 8 November 1986 |
Clive turns to Ted, when he seeks to get out of his engagement with Gladys without hurting her feelings. Meanwhile, Yvonne is distraught after it transpires that Barry has left her, leading her to refuse to leave her chalet to perform dance numbers. To rectify the problem, Gladys calls on Julian to come back to the camp and help her out, as he is the only man Yvonne ever loved before Barry became her husband.
| 47 | "The New Broom" | Robin Carr | 15 November 1986 |
The entertainment staff are shocked when Maplin sends over Alec Foster to serve the camp as its new Camp Controller, and he has already been busy after firing some of the camp's staff. Peggy sees his arrival as the opportunity she's been waiting for to be a Yellowcoat. But she soon discover that getting the job may entail doing things she rather wouldn't with Foster.
| 48 | "Orphan of the Storm" | Robin Carr | 22 November 1986 |
Foster continues to dominate life at the camp, and bullies Peggy to the point that he fires her. The matter is made worse when he makes a pass at Gladys, punches Spike, and fires Clive for defending her. The matter looks hopeless for the staff, until Sammy returns to the camp, intent on rectifying the situation and make up for his misdeed with the group.
| 49 | "God Bless Our Family" | Robin Carr and David Croft | 6 December 1986 |
Clive is shocked when his parents arrive at the camp, along with his uncles, in hopes of making him see sense and return home to the family estate. He is even more concerned when he learns they know of his engagement with Gladys, and are intent on not sanctioning it. For once in his life, Clive decides to make a noble gesture, one he soon wants out of when he does it.
| 50 | "Only the Brave" | Robin Carr and David Croft | 13 December 1986 |
Spike's feelings for April are properly renewed after spending time worrying over Gladys, and so he asks Ted to arrange a special treat for his girlfriend at the local cinema. But the late-night trip to see April's favourite film actually winds up with them watching a black-and-white war film. One that causes Gladys to fall asleep and dream of it, but with the camp staff assuming all of the roles in the film.
| 51 | "September Song" | David Croft | 27 December 1986 |
Ted falls in love with a young woman who's a talented pianist, despite the fact she is holidaying with her parents. For the first time in his life, he faces a dilema, when his dreams of marrying her and forming a musical act together, are made to face the reality that her future could be ruined if he goes through with it. Note: This is a Christmas special and has a runtime of 45 minutes.

=== Series 9 (1987–1988) ===
| No. | Title | Directed by | Original release date |
|---|---|---|---|
| 52 | "Tell It to the Marines" | David Croft | 26 December 1987 |
A group of Royal Marines arrive at the camp to demonstrate their physical skill, but Ted gets boastful about the strengths of the male Yellowcoats. The Marines' sergeant decides to call his bluff, and makes a wager that his colleagues can't beat his own men in a race on one of their assault courses. Meanwhile, Peggy falls for an aspiring musician who she feels deserves a big break. Note: This is a Christmas special and has a runtime of 45 minutes.
| 53 | "Marry Go Round" | Mike Stephens | 2 January 1988 |
Spike worries that his recent engagement to April is impacting his job, when the campers make complaints about his recent comedic performances. Needing advice, he turns to Gladys for help, but Yvonne sees them together and makes the wrong assumption that the pair have hooked up together. This soon gets Clive into trouble when he believes this could help him get out of his engagement to Gladys.
| 54 | "The Perils of Peggy" | Mike Stephens | 9 January 1988 |
Following a visit to his parents, Clive discovers he truly loves Gladys, but after his recent behaviour he finds she no longer trusts him. Seeking to prove his love to her, he turns to Ted for help, who decides to manufacture situations where Peggy is put in danger, in hopes Gladys can witness Clive saving her from these. However, none of these work out as planned, leaving Clive to despair, until Gladys gets herself into real trouble.
| 55 | "Let Them Eat Cake" | Mike Stephens | 16 January 1988 |
Ted devises a French Revolution Tableau to help draw attention to the camp and improve bookings. But rehearsals don't go well, as Peggy faints when playing the lead role for the show. Then matters are made worse when Foster, visiting the camp, seeks revenge on Ted by firing him for his idea and replacing him with a new comic, who just happens to be much worse.
| 56 | "Wedding Bells" | Mike Stephens | 23 January 1988 |
Clive is truly happy that this time he wants to marry Gladys, but is deeply worried that his family will intervent to prevent the marriage. He swiftly decides the affair should be done in secret, but Yvonne meddles in this by alerting his parents to what is happening. Only a tip-off from his family's maid, alerts Clive to this, prompting him to turn to Ted for help to ensure his happy day with Gladys goes off without a hitch.
| 57 | "The Wind of Change" | Mike Stephens | 30 January 1988 |
The 1960 holiday season is coming to a close, but a hiccup in proceedings leads to Gladys being down one female Yellowcoat. For Peggy, the chance she has been waiting for arrives, and she finally gets her dream come true. But as everyone considers what they will be doing next year, Foster returns with some news that impacts all of them. Note: The runtime of this episode is just under 34 minutes.
