= Brenda Cowling =

English actress (1925–2010)

- Born: Brenda Rose Cowling; 23 April 1925; Islington, London, England
- Died: 2 October 2010 (aged 85); Northwood, London, England
- Education: RADA
- Occupation: Actress
- Years active: 1950–2006

Brenda Rose Cowling (23 April 1925 – 2 October 2010) was an English actress from London.

== Biography ==
Cowling wanted to be a film actress from the time she was a child; however, upon leaving school, she trained instead as a shorthand typist.

After a time she joined the Royal Academy of Dramatic Art, where she was a member of the same class as Warren Mitchell and Jimmy Perry. While there, she made her film debut in a small role in Alfred Hitchcock's Stage Fright (1950).

Much of her early acting work was in repertory, before she began her television career. She also appeared in films, such as The Railway Children (1970), Please Sir! (1971), Carry On Girls (1973), Carry On Behind (1975). International Velvet (1978), Oliver Twist (1982) and Octopussy (1983). Television serials in which she appeared include Follyfoot, Miss Marple in They Do It With Mirrors as Mrs. Rodgers in 1991, Fawlty Towers as a nurse in "The Germans", Only When I Laugh as the matron nurse in "Last Tango" in 1980, Are You Being Served? as a customer in "The Erotic Dreams of Mrs Slocombe", Jonathan Creek in "Gorgons Wood" as Mrs. Thrimpson (2004), Dad's Army as Mrs. Prentice in "All is Safely Gathered In", It Ain't Half Hot Mum in "The Last Roll Call" as the WVS Lady, The Famous Five, three episodes of Hi-de-Hi!, notably as a (voice only role) station announcer in "Together Again", a camper in "Raffles", and a maid in "Wedding Bells", and Mrs. Wren in The Legacy of Reginald Perrin. One of her better known roles was as the cook, Mrs. Lipton, in four series' of You Rang, M'Lord?.

Cowling retired in 2006 after suffering a stroke. She died on 2 October 2010, at the actors' retirement home, Denville Hall, aged 85.

== Selected filmography ==
Year	Title	Role	Notes
1950	Stage Fright	Plump RADA Girl (uncredited)	
1956	The Silken Affair	Minor Role (uncredited)	
1966	Bindle (One of Them Days)	Martha Hearty	
1969	Up in the Air	Lady Pennyweight	
1970	The Railway Children	Mrs. Viney	
1971	Please Sir!	Mrs. Duffy	
1972	Young Winston	Mrs. Dewsnap (uncredited)	
1973	Carry On Girls	Matron	
1974	The Black Windmill	Pleasant Secretary (uncredited)	
1975	Carry On Behind	Wife (uncredited)	
1977	Jabberwocky	Mrs. Fishfinger	
1977	The Black Panther	TBC	
1978	International Velvet	Alice	
1982	Pink Floyd – The Wall	Teacher	
1983	Never Say Never Again		Scene deleted
1983	Octopussy	Schatzi	
1986	Dream Lover	Hotel Manager	
2000	Greenfingers	Book Shop Customer	
2000	Room to Rent	Church Lady	

== Television ==
Year	Title	Role	Notes
1959-1961	Emergency Ward 10	Mrs. Reid/Mrs. Smith	3 episodes
1962-1969	Dixon of Dock Green	Doris Gray, Miss Nicholls	2 episodes
1962-74	Z-Cars	Various	3 episodes
1963	Maigret	Madame Pardon	Episode: "A Man Condemned"
1963	The Avengers	Masseuse	Episode: "The Medicine Men"
1963	Compact	Mrs. Gregson	Episode: "No Promises - I'll Take Cash"
1964	Sergeant Cork	Sarah Jenkins	Episode: "The Case of the Bristol Mail"
1967	The Forsyte Saga	Miss Perren	5 episodes
1967	The Newcomers	Mrs. Bennett	2 episodes
1969	Special Branch	Mrs. Madwick	Episode: "A Date With Leonidas"
1970	The Goodies	Lady	Episode: "Radio Goodies"
1971	Budgie	Customer in Supermarket	Episode: "Brains"
1971	The Rivals of Sherlock Holmes	Maid	Episode: "Madame Sara"
1972	Dad's Army	Mrs. Prentice	Episode: "All is Safely Gathered In"
1972	Follyfoot	Lady Caroline Beck	Episode: "The Awakening"
1973	Oh Father!	Mrs. Rourke	Episode: "Angels and Ministers"
1973	Romany Jones	Betty's Mother	3 episodes
1974	The Pallisers	Mrs. Bunce	5 episodes
1974	Justice	Mrs. Cosgrove	Episode: "The Price of Innocence"
1974	No Strings	Mrs. Bunce	5 episodes
1975	Fawlty Towers	Sister	Episode: "The Germans"
1976	Angels	Staff Nurse	2 episodes
1977	Raffles	Mrs. Van Der Berg	Episode: "A Bad Night"
1977	Happy Ever After	Mrs. Robinson	Episode: "He Who Excavates is Last"
1977	The Duchess of Duke Street	Elsie Richards	2 episodes
1978	The Famous Five	Jenny	Episode: "Five Are Together Again"
1979-1983	Potter	Jane	18 episodes
1980	Only When I Laugh	Matron	Episode: "Last Tango"
1980	Shoestring	Mrs. Margaret Billington	Episode: "The Mayfly Dance"
1981	Nanny	Nanny Roberts	Episode: "Innocent Party"
1981	Are You Being Served?	Lady Customer	Episode: "The Erotic Dreams of Mrs. Slocombe"
1981	You're Only Young Twice	Mrs. Hawkhead	Episode: "Desirable Residence"
1981	It Ain't Half Hot Mum	WVS Lady	Episode: "The Last Roll Call"
1982	Oliver Twist	Mrs. Bedwin	TV film
1982	The Agatha Christie Hour	Miss Draper	Episode: "The Case of the Middle-Aged Wife"
1984-1988	Hi-de-Hi!	Lady Camper/Nora/Station Announcer	3 episodes
1985	The Secret Diary of Adrian Mole Aged 13¾	Matron	3 episodes
1985	Lytton's Diary	Customer	Episode: "Come uppance"
1985-1987	In Sickness and in Health	Woman Patient/Home Help/Matron	3 episodes
1986	All in Good Faith	Brenda Trail	Episode: "An Eye for an Eye"
1986	Grange Hill	Shopkeeper	1 episode
1986	London's Burning	Man's Wife	TV film
1986	T-Bag	Bunty Badshott	Episode: "Ben and Bunty Badshott"
1987	Dorothy L. Sayers Mystery	Mrs. Lundy	Episode: "Have His Carcass: Episode Three"
1987	The Charmer	Chambermaid	Episode: "Gorse at the End"
1988-1993	You Rang M'Lord?	Mrs. Blanche Lipton	26 episodes
1989-2002	The Bill	Various	4 episodes
1991	Miss Marple	Mrs. Rogers	Episode: "They Do It With Mirrors"
1993	The Upper Hand	Nun	Episode: "Tunnel of Love"
1996	The Legacy of Reginald Perrin	Mrs. Wren	1 episode
1997	The Detectives	Bride's Grandmother	Episode: "Best Man"
1997	Goodnight Sweetheart	Miss Weatherell	Episode: "The Bells are Ringing"
1999	Babes in the Wood	Mourner	1 episode
2000	Where the Heart Is	Martha	Episode: "Friend in Need"
2000	Barbara	Sarah	Episode: "Massage"
2001	Bernard's Watch	Mrs. Tatchell	Episode: "Alien Times"
2003	The Last Detective	Old Lady	Episode: "Lofty"
2004	Jonathan Creek	Mrs. Thrimpston	Episode: "Gorgon's Wood"
2004	Murder in Suburbia	Mrs. Kirkman	Episode: "Sanctuary"
2004	The Legend of the Tamworth Two	Mrs. Martin	TV film
2004	French and Saunders	Older Dawn	5 episodes
2005	According to Bex	Vox Pops	2 episodes
