= Doolally =

Doolally or Dolally may refer to:

- Deolali, India, the former site of a British Army transit camp
  - Deolali transit camp
    - Doolally tap or simply "Doolally", meaning to 'lose one's mind', derived from the boredom felt at the camp
- The former name of Shanks & Bigfoot, a British dance-music duo
