= Mike Kinsey =

British politician and actor (born 1943)

Councillor, London Borough of Harrow (Greenhill ward)
- In office 2 May 2002 – 4 May 2006
- Preceded by: Anastasia Attiki
- Succeeded by: Golam Chowdhury

Personal details
- Born: Michael Kinsey; 5 December 1943 (age 82) Bilston, Staffordshire, England
- Party: Labour
- Children: 2
- Education: Birmingham School of Acting

Michael Kinsey (born 5 December 1943) is an English former actor and politician. He is best known for portraying Gunner "Nosher" Evans in the comedy series It Ain't Half Hot Mum. Kinsey was the councillor in the ward of Greenhill in the London Borough of Harrow from 2002 to 2006.

== Early life ==
Kinsey was born in Bilston and was raised in Birmingham. He attended Birmingham School of Speech Training and Dramatic Art for three years and from 1969 to 1972 was involved with musical theatre.

== Acting ==
=== Television ===
His first television work was as a fisherman in a 1971 episode of Coopers End. In 1973, he was in an episode of the anthology series Love Story and was a barman in the television movie, Achilles Heel.

Kinsey's break out role came in 1974 when, through his agent, he met Jimmy Perry and David Croft, who auditioned him for the part of Gunner 'Nosher' Evans in the BBC sitcom It Ain't Half Hot Mum, which ran for eight series from 1974 to 1981. In the show, soldiers in the concert party all had nicknames that fit with their personality, but according to Kinsey in a 2021 interview, Gunner Evans originally did not have a nickname however when show co-creator David Croft saw him eating pie and chips during break he looked at Kinsey and said "I know the name for you now; Nosher"; Kinsey said in the same interview that he didn't normally have lunch on set and that the one time he ate on set which gave his character the name was "most unfortunate" as every one of his lines from then onwards was spoken by Mike with food stuffed in his mouth, jokingly saying that he "regetted it to this day".

Amongst other roles, he has also played a reporter in the 1975 drama Nightmare for a Nightingale. He appeared as a guest in two episodes of This Is Your Life, appearing with all of his It Ain't Half Hot Mum co-stars for Windsor Davies' episode in 1976 and appearing with Kenneth MacDonald, Michael Knowles and Don Estelle for George Layton's episode in 1999.

Kinsey acted as a farmer in an episode of Dangerfield in 1997. He returned to acting in 2016 to shoot the independent film My Day, as elderly man Frank, which was released in 2019.

=== Theatre ===
Kinsey's theatre debut was in the stage show "Beware of the Dog", which ran at the Birmingham Repertory Theatre from 11—29 June 1968. A stage show of It Ain't Half Hot Mum featuring most of the shows cast ran from 1982 to 1983, however did not feature Mike in the ensemble. Kinsey was in a production of Once a Catholic at the Theatre Royal in Nottingham from 3—8 September 1984. Kinsey was also in a production of Cinderella, starring Sally Thomsett, the first show to be played out at the Harlequin Theatre in Redhill, Surrey from December 1986 to January 1987.

== Politics ==
Kinsey started working as a businessman in London and became more involved in politics in the late 1980s. He was a governor for St Theresa's Catholic school in Finchley until before 2002. In the 2002 Harrow London Borough Council election, Kinsey was elected as a Labour Party councillor in the ward of Greenhill in the London Borough of Harrow; he won the election on 2 May 2002, with a total of 908 votes and served four years, taking over from Anastasia Altiki, during which he was present at twenty-four meetings. He stood down from Greenhill at the 2006 local elections on 4 May 2006. His role was succeeded by Golam Chowdhury.

== Personal life ==
Kinsey is married and has two children. He was a member of Transport and General Workers' Union. Kinsey is 5 ft 9in (175 cm).

In 2021, Kinsey criticised the casting of black actor Jodie Turner-Smith as the white Anne Boleyn in the titular miniseries but the refusal of airing It Ain't Half Hot Mum due to white actor Michael Bates portraying Rangi Ram in brownface, on his twitter account: "Channel 5s New series Ann Boleyn has black actress playing white queen that's okay. Yet BBC TV refuses to show the series It Aint Half Hot Mum with White actor playing an Indian character?"

== Filmography ==
=== Film ===
Year	Title	Role
2019	My Day	Frank

=== Television ===
Year	Title	Role	Notes
1971	Coopers End	Fisherman	One episode
1973	Love Story	Warren	One episode
1973	Achilles Heel	1st barman	TV Movie
1974—1981	It Ain't Half Hot Mum	Gunner "Nosher" Evans	Fifty-six episodes
1975	A Little Bit of Wisdom	Burgular	One episode
1975	The Brothers	Lorry driver	One episode
1975	Play for Today	Van driver	One episode (Brassneck)
1975	Thriller	Second reporter	One episode
1976, 1999	This is Your Life	Himself	Two episodes
1977	Happy Ever After	Policeman	One episode
1978	Play of the Month	Thompson	One episode
1997	Dangerfield	Farmer	One episode
2007	Comedy Connections	Himself	Documentary

== Stage ==
Year	Dates	Venues	Show	Role
1968	11 — 29 June 1968	Birmingham Repertory Theatre	Beware of the Dog	unknown
1984	3 — 8 September 1984	Theatre Royal, Nottingham	Once a Catholic	unknown
1986—1987	6 December 1986 — 10 January 1987	Harlequin Theatre, Redhill	Cinderella	unknown

== Discography ==
Year	Title	Notes
1975	It Ain't Half Hot Mum - Featuring The Artists From The Popular BBC-TV Series	Soundtrack from It Ain't Half Hot Mum
