= Jungle Patrol =

Jungle Patrol may refer to:

- Jungle Patrol (1944 film), an Australian documentary
- Jungle Patrol (1948 film), an American film
- "The Jungle Patrol", a 1974 episode of television sitcom It Ain't Half Hot Mum
