= Birmingham School of Acting =

Drama school in England (1936–2017)

Coordinates: 52.4827°N 1.8859°W

Birmingham School of Acting (Royal Birmingham Conservatoire)
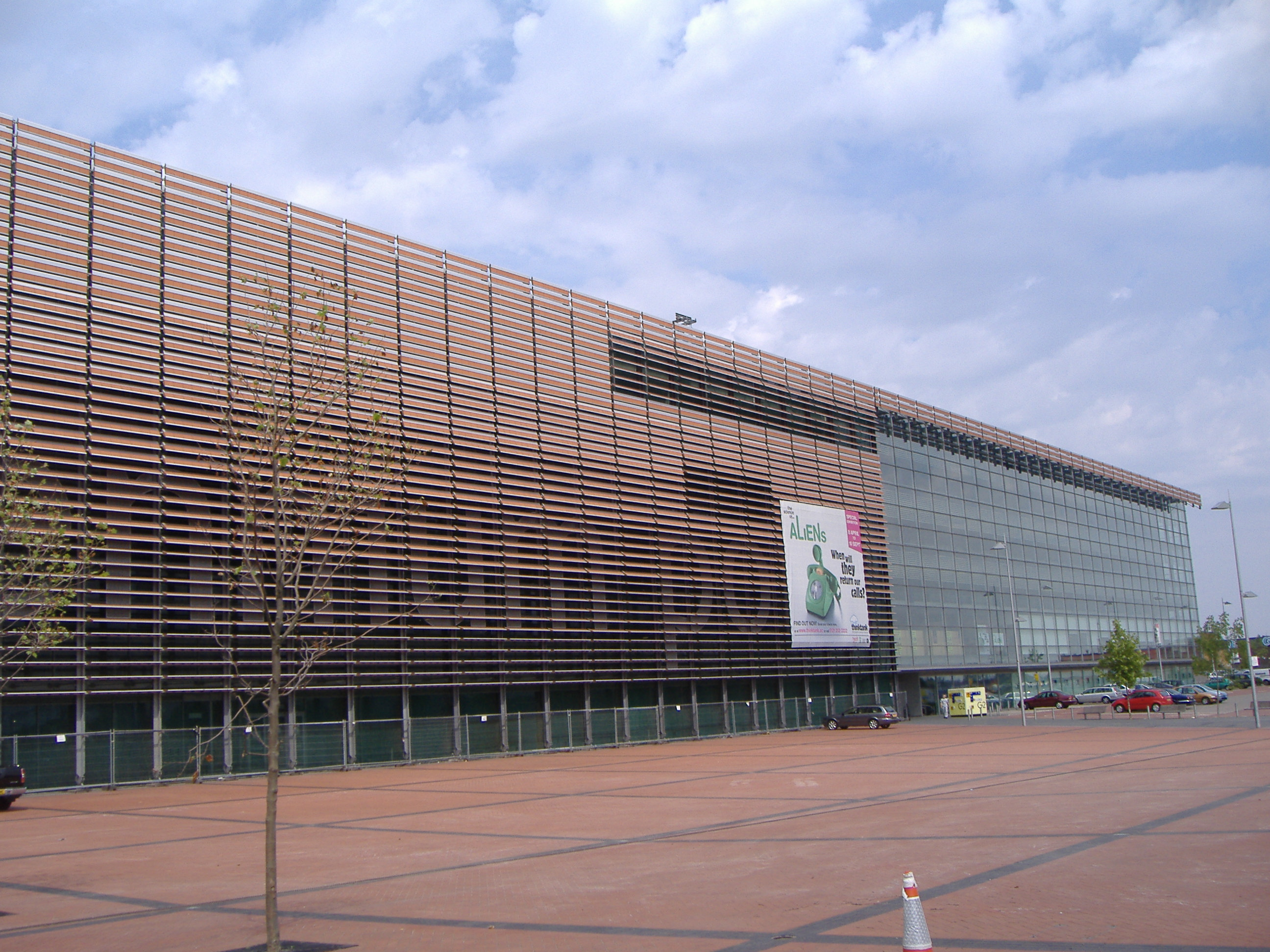
- Former names: Birmingham School of Acting, Birmingham School of Speech Training and Dramatic Art, Birmingham School of Speech and Drama
- Type: Drama school
- Active: 1936–present
- Academic affiliations: Royal Birmingham Conservatoire Birmingham City University, FDS
- Director: Stephen Simms
- Students: 100+
- Location: Birmingham, England
- Campus: City Centre Campus, Millennium Point
- Website: {https://www.bcu.ac.uk/conservatoire/acting}

Birmingham School of Acting (BSA), previously known as Birmingham School of Speech Training and Dramatic Art (BSSTDA) and then as Birmingham School of Speech and Drama (BSSD) is a drama school located in Birmingham, England and is a part of the Royal Birmingham Conservatoire.

The school provides training for actors and stage management and is partnered with FDS.

== History ==
It was founded in 1936 by Pamela Chapman and became a faculty of Birmingham City University in 2005. In September 2006, it moved from Paradise Place to a purpose-built facility at Millennium Point in the city's Eastside area. In 2008, it became a school of the university's Faculty of Performance, Media and English (PME), and in September 2017 it merged to become part of the Royal Birmingham Conservatoire.

== Alumni ==
Alumni of the school include:

- Mike Kinsey (It Ain't Half Hot Mum)
- Nicola Coughlan (Derry Girls)
- Robyn Cara (Ackley Bridge)
- Ashley Rice (Doctors)
- Nicol Williamson (Excalibur)
- Tom Lister (Emmerdale)
- Catherine Tyldesley (Coronation Street)
- Rachel Bright (EastEnders)
- Barbara Keogh (EastEnders)
- Luke Mably (Dream Team)
- James Bradshaw (Hollyoaks)
- Jeffrey Holland (Hi-de-Hi!)
- David Holt (Angry Kid)
- Anna Brewster (Versailles)
- Jimi Mistry (East Is East)
- Helen George (Call the Midwife)
- Ainsley Howard (Mum & Dad)
- Carole Boyd (The Archers)
- Nicholas Gledhill (Wild Boys)
