= The Long Duel =

1967 British film by Ken Annakin

- Film poster by Frank McCarthy
- Directed by: Ken Annakin
- Screenplay by: Peter Yeldham
- Story by: Ranveer Singh
- Produced by: Ken Annakin; Aida Young
- Starring: Yul Brynner; Trevor Howard; Harry Andrews; Andrew Keir; Charlotte Rampling
- Cinematography: Jack Hildyard
- Edited by: Bert Bates
- Music by: John Scott
- Production company: Rank Organisation Film Productions
- Distributed by: The Rank Organisation
- Release date: 27 July 1967
- Running time: 115 minutes
- Country: United Kingdom
- Language: English
- Budget: £1,069,669

The Long Duel is a 1967 British adventure film directed by Ken Annakin and starring Yul Brynner, Trevor Howard, Charlotte Rampling and Harry Andrews. It was written by Peter Yeldham and is set in British-ruled India of the 1920s.

== Plot ==
Superintendent Stafford of the United Provinces Police has his men arrest a tribal group on vague allegations of poaching and theft in British India. Sultan, their leader, is also arrested and held in a cell with criminals in Fort Najibabad. Sultan, his wife Tara and many others manage to break out, but Tara and her newborn child both die. Sultan, with the help of his men, revolts against the peace-keeping British, leading to bitter battles and a final showdown. The film tries to be fair to all sides of the conflict.

== Cast ==
- Yul Brynner as Sultan
- Trevor Howard as Young
- Harry Andrews as Stafford
- Charlotte Rampling as Jane
- Virginia North as Champa
- Andrew Keir as Gungaram
- Laurence Naismith as McDougal
- Maurice Denham as Governor
- George Pastell as Ram Ghand
- Antoñito Ruiz as Munnu
- Imogen Hassall as Tara
- Paul Hardwick as Jamadar
- David Sumner as Gyan Singh
- Rafiq Anwar as Pahelwan
- Shivendra Sinha as Abdul
- Zohra Sehgal as Devi
- Dino Shafeek as Akbar
- Patrick Newell as Colonel
- Jeremy Lloyd as Crabbe
- Terence Alexander as Major
- Marianne Stone as Major's wife
- Edward Fox as Hardwicke

== Production ==
The film was developed by Sydney Box in collaboration with Vivian Cox. He approached Ken Annakin to direct, and Annakin agreed, pending finance. Eventually this was (supposedly) secured, with Yul Brynner and Trevor Howard to star. Annakin called it "very acceptable adventure story set in the late days of the British Raj."

In March 1966, The Rank Organisation announced it would make nine films with a total cost of £7.5 million of which it would provide £4 million. Two films were financed by Rank completely, a Norman Wisdom movie and a "doctor" comedy (Doctor on Toast which became Doctor in Trouble). The others were The Quiller Memorandum, Deadlier Than the Male, Maroc 7, Red Hot Ferrari (never made), The Fifth Coin (never made), Battle of Britain and The Long Duel. FilmInk argued "It is really weird that Rank made a big imperial adventure so late in the day."

The film was to be shot in Dehradun and Mussoorie in North India, with a combination of British and Indian financing, plus the assistance of the Maharah of Baroda (Pratap Singh Rao Gaekwad). According to Annakin, Rank agreed to provide three million pounds of the budget, with Sydney Box guaranteeing five million, which was to come through released blocked rupeees or local investors, underwritten by the Maharajah. Annakin and his crew went to India to start preproduction. However Indian financing fell through – Annakin claimed this was in part due to several Indian businessman, who were meant to provide finance under a tax shelter deal, went to prison for tax evasion - and replacement funds were not forthcoming. Matters were complicated when Sydney Box had a heart attack.

Annakin suggested that the film could be shot instead in Spain, where he had made several movies. This was done, with the unit based at Granada, and Rank ended up providing the entire budget. Costumes were shipped from India. It was reportedly the first time Rank entirely financed a movie in 20 years. The Long Duel was the studio's first international adventure film since The Singer Not the Song.

Rank sold the US rights to Paramount for two million pounds.

== Reception ==
The Monthly Film Bulletin wrote: "It's that old North West Frontier again, with the British Raj taking time off from cocktail parties in the Gymkhana Club to oppress the natives and trying hard to convince themselves that India is really just like Surrey. ... Given a better script (and the dialogue here seems to have been written by a computer fed a programme of execrable films on the same theme), the respect that the Indian rebel and the liberal British officer have for each other might have been plausible and even interesting. As it is, not even reliable performances from Trevor Howard and Harry Andrews and the usual solid one from Yul Brynner can hold the film together. Ken Annakin's direction is surprisingly wooden for the man who made The Battle of the Bulge, and the exteriors (shot in Spain) are marred by some grotesque painted backcloths."

== Bibliography ==
- Annakin, Ken (2001). So you wanna be a director?. Tomahawk Press.
