= When Did You Last See Your Money? =

- Dad's Army episode
- Episode no.: Series 6 Episode 9
- Directed by: David Croft
- Story by: Jimmy Perry and David Croft
- Original air date: 1 December 1972
- Running time: 30 minutes

Episode chronology
← Previous "All is Safely Gathered In"	Next → "Brain Versus Brawn"

"When Did You Last See Your Money?" is the ninth episode of the sixth series of the British comedy series Dad's Army. It was originally transmitted on 1 December 1972.

== Synopsis ==
Jones arrives at the bank to deposit a donation by local shopkeepers of £500 for the serviceman's canteen, but the packet that he hands over contains sausages, not money.

== Plot ==
During a typical day at Swallows Bank, Mainwaring complains about Pike's unprofessional talk with customers and insists that Wilson and Pike continue to use the door to enter his office (despite the fact that bombs have destroyed most of the building and the door is pretty much the only part of the wall left intact). Jones comes in to deposit £500 that has been raised by the local shopkeepers for the servicemen's canteen (Jones is the treasurer) and faints in shock when it turns out he accidentally brought a packet of sausages instead.

Jones becomes obsessed with finding the money, annoying the rest of the platoon as they stay up all night to help him remember. Frazer offers to hypnotise Jones (which causes the Verger to think Frazer is practising satanism) and, under hypnosis, Jones remembers that he may have put the money in a chicken instead of giblets. The platoon rush to the house of Mr Blewitt, who bought the chicken, and demand to inspect it, much to the old man's confusion (Jones asks Mainwaring not to mention the lost money to keep Jones' good name untarnished). Unfortunately, a very confusing search is unsuccessful.

Back at the bank the next day, Jones decides to pay the amount out of his own money, despite the fact that this will bankrupt him. Just then, however, Mr Billings comes into the bank to reveal that Jones gave him the money instead of the sausages the previous day by mistake, leaving the matter happily resolved (although Mainwaring will have to explain the 'mysterious' disappearance of the sausages, which he ate himself).

== Cast ==
- Arthur Lowe as Captain Mainwaring
- John Le Mesurier as Sergeant Wilson
- Clive Dunn as Lance Corporal Jones
- John Laurie as Private Frazer
- James Beck as Private Walker
- Arnold Ridley as Private Godfrey
- Ian Lavender as Private Pike
- Bill Pertwee as ARP Warden Hodges
- Edward Sinclair as The Verger
- Frank Williams as The Vicar
- Harold Bennett as Mr Blewitt
- Tony Hughes as Mr Billings
