= List of It Ain't Half Hot Mum episodes =

It Ain't Half Hot Mum is a British television sitcom, written by Jimmy Perry and David Croft. Set in 1945 during the last months of the Second World War, the series follows members of a concert party of the Royal Artillery. The sitcom ran for eight series, which were broadcast on BBC1 from 3 January 1974 to 3 September 1981. Each series had between six and eight episodes. Fifty-six episodes were created in total, and each had a duration of 30 minutes. Series 1 to 4 were set in Deolali, India, while Series 5 to 8 were set in the fictional village of Tin Min, Burma.

Episodes were filmed from 1973 and 1981, with a break in 1979. Two episodes from the first series, "A Star is Born" and "It's a Wise Child", are currently missing from the BBC Archives, since they were wiped after their repeat broadcasts. In 1988, two off-air VHS recordings of the missing episodes were discovered in Australia by Dave Homewood, the founder of the New Zealand branch of the Dad's Army Appreciation Society. They had been recorded from Australian broadcasts on Channel 7; however, they are incomplete, since Channel 7 edited certain scenes from the episodes so that they would fit within the channel's timeslot. An estimated four minutes has been edited from these episodes.

== Series overview ==
Series	Episodes	Originally released	
Series	Episodes	First released	Last released
1	8	3 January 1974	21 February 1974
2	8	2 January 1975	20 February 1975
3	6	2 January 1976	6 February 1976
4	8	2 November 1976	28 December 1976
5	6	25 October 1977	29 November 1977
6	7	23 October 1978	18 December 1978
7	6	17 October 1980	21 November 1980
8	7	23 July 1981	3 September 1981

== Episodes ==
=== Series 1 (1974) ===
No. overall	No. in series	Title	Produced & Directed by	Written by	Original release date
1	1	"Meet the Gang"	David Croft	David Croft and Jimmy Perry	3 January 1974
The Concert Party are trying to rehearse a show without their pianist Gunner Graham, who's been sent on jankers by Sergeant Major Williams. A new gunner arrives in the camp. An anti-British demonstration disrupts the show. Also starring Nik Zaran and Ashwin Patel.
2	2	"My Lovely Boy"	David Croft	David Croft and Jimmy Perry	10 January 1974
Rangi Ram notices that the Sergeant Major and Gunner Parkin have a photograph of the same woman by their bed: she is the Sergeant's one and only love and Parky's mother. Does this mean that Gunner Parkin is his son?
3	3	"Mutiny of the Punka-Wallahs"	David Croft	David Croft and Jimmy Perry	17 January 1974
The plan to replace the Punkawallahs leads to trouble. Meanwhile, the boys are having problems with the heat. Also starring Nik Zaran.
4	4	"A Star is Born"	David Croft	David Croft and Jimmy Perry	24 January 1974
When Gunner Parkin is removed from the concert party because of his incompetence, the Sergeant Major sees a chance to send the other men up the jungle. Note: This episode is currently missing from the BBC Archives. In 1988, an off-air VHS recording of this episode, with four minutes edited out, was discovered in Australia.
5	5	"The Jungle Patrol"	David Croft	David Croft and Jimmy Perry	31 January 1974
The Sergeant Major takes the concert party on a jungle survival course in an attempt to make soldiers of them, but who will come out on top? Also starring Geoffrey Lumsden and Mohammad Shamsi.
6	6	"It's a Wise Child"	David Croft	David Croft and Jimmy Perry	7 February 1974
The men of the concert party as well as the Sergeant Major try to find out the truth about Gunner Parkin's father. Also starring Renu Setna. Note: This episode is currently missing from the BBC Archives. In 1988, an off-air VHS recording of this episode, with four minutes edited out, was discovered in Australia.
7	7	"The Road to Bannu"	David Croft	David Croft and Jimmy Perry	14 February 1974
The concert party have the misfortune to get stranded in a remote part of the North West Frontier. The Sergeant Major sends Lofty to go find help. Also starring Rafiq Anwar, Ishaq Bux and Zohra Sehgal.
8	8	"The Inspector Calls"	David Croft	David Croft and Jimmy Perry	21 February 1974
The Sergeant Major finds a way to get the concert party into uniform by devising a military musical number for them. Also starring Jeffrey Segal.

=== Series 2 (1975) ===
No. overall	No. in series	Title	Produced & Directed by	Written by	Original release date
9	1	"Showing the Flag"	David Croft	David Croft and Jimmy Perry	2 January 1975
The Sergeant Major tries to train the concert party to lower the flag at sunset. Also starring Ishaq Bux and Barry Sinclair.
10	2	"Down in the Jungle"	David Croft	David Croft and Jimmy Perry	9 January 1975
The concert party's plane makes a crash landing and the men realise they could be behind enemy lines. Also starring Saad Ghazi, Mohammad Shamsi and Tariq Yunus.
11	3	"The Natives Are Revolting"	David Croft	David Croft and Jimmy Perry	16 January 1975
The Sergeant Major is determined to find out who replaced the camp's Union Jack with an Indian flag. Also starring Renu Setna.
12	4	"Cabaret Time"	David Croft	David Croft and Jimmy Perry	23 January 1975
A performance in the Kama Sutra Club gets the concert party and the Battery Sergeant Major into trouble. Also starring Robin Browne, Bobby Dennis, Talat Hussein and Arnold Peters.
13	5	"The Curse of the Sadhu"	David Croft	David Croft and Jimmy Perry	30 January 1975
Sergeant Williams tempts the wrath of the gods by ejecting a revered holy man from the parade ground. Also starring Minoo Golvala and Ranjit Nakara.
14	6	"Forbidden Fruits"	David Croft	David Croft and Jimmy Perry	6 February 1975
When the army runs out of "that stuff they put in our tea" the men cannot stop thinking about women. Colonel Reynolds tries to see Mrs Waddilove-Evans when her husband is not home. Also starring Margaret Courtenay, Michael Moore and Yasuko Nagazumi.
15	7	"Has Anyone Seen My Cobra?"	David Croft	David Croft and Jimmy Perry	13 February 1975
A snake-charmer's cobra goes missing and is found in the Sergeant Major's quarters. Also starring Renu Setna, Rudolf Ramillo, Azad Ali, Ahmed Khalil, Sultan Lalani and Ashwin Patel.
16	8	"The Night of the Thugs"	David Croft	David Croft and Jimmy Perry	20 February 1975
The concert party take refuge from a rainstorm in a ruined temple and fall victim to a fanatical native sect. Also starring Minoo Golvala. Note: This was the final episode in which George Layton starred as Bombardier Solomons.

=== Series 3 (1976) ===
No. overall	No. in series	Title	Produced & Directed by	Written by	Original release date
17	1	"The Supremo Show"	Graeme Muir	David Croft and Jimmy Perry	2 January 1976
While the officers are out of the way in hospital, Williams takes the opportunity to post the concert party up the jungle, but is forced to bring them back to stage a special performance. Also starring Richard Grant and Ahmed Khalil.
18	2	"Mind My Maharajah"	Graeme Muir	David Croft and Jimmy Perry	9 January 1976
The concert party is sent to the palace of the Maharajah of Bharatpur to protect him. Also starring McDonald Hobley, Cy Town, Renu Setna and Ashwin Patel.
19	3	"Bang Goes the Maharajah"	Graeme Muir	David Croft and Jimmy Perry	16 January 1976
The concert party try to stop the attempts on the life of the Maharajah of Bharatpur. Also starring Renu Setna and Ashwin Patel.
20	4	"The Grand Illusion"	Graeme Muir	David Croft and Jimmy Perry	23 January 1976
Sergeant Major Williams finds that bragging about his troops can get him into trouble. Also starring Saad Ghazi, Rudolf Ramillo, Minoo Golvala and David Lodge.
21	5	"Pale Hands I Love"	Graeme Muir	David Croft and Jimmy Perry	30 January 1976
The sergeant major falls in love and gets into trouble with the Tongs. Also starring Robert Lee, Yasuko Nagazumi and Vincent Wong.
22	6	"Don't Take the Micky"	Graeme Muir	David Croft and Jimmy Perry	6 February 1976
Sergeant Major Williams tries to break up the concert party by promoting Gunner Graham. Also starring Talat Hussein.

=== Series 4 (1976) ===
No. overall	No. in series	Title	Produced & Directed by	Written by	Original release date
23	1	"Monsoon Madness"	David Croft and Bob Spiers	David Croft and Jimmy Perry	2 November 1976
When the Sergeant-Major makes the Concert party perform fatigues to be ready for the arrival of the monsoon, Lofty goes mad and vows to kill the Sergeant-Major.
24	2	"Kidnapped in the Khyber"	David Croft and Bob Spiers	David Croft and Jimmy Perry	9 November 1976
When it becomes difficult for Colonel Reynolds to hide his affair with Mrs Waddilove-Evans, he decides it's best to accompany the concert party to a show on the North-West Frontier. Also starring Frances Bennett, Sultan Lalani and Saad Ghazi.
25	3	"A Fate Worse Than Death"	David Croft and Bob Spiers	David Croft and Jimmy Perry	16 November 1976
The members of the concert party try to find the kidnapped Mrs Waddilove-Evans. Also starring Frances Bennett, Sultan Lalani and Saad Ghazi.
26	4	"Ticket to Blighty"	David Croft	David Croft and Jimmy Perry	23 November 1976
Bombardier Beaumont tries different ways to get sent home. Also starring Mavis Pugh, Bernice Adams and Andrea Godfrey.
27	5	"Lofty's Little Friend"	David Croft and Bob Spiers	David Croft and Jimmy Perry	30 November 1976
An elephant follows Lofty to the camp. Also starring Mohammad Shamsi and Azad Ali.
28	6	"Flight to Jawani"	David Croft and Bob Spiers	David Croft and Jimmy Perry	7 December 1976
Men from a remote RAF base get too excited when the concert party puts on a show. Also starring Freddie Earlle, Hal Galili, Tim Barrett, Robin Parkinson, Jeffrey Holland and Talat Hussein.
29	7	"We Are Not Amused"	David Croft and Bob Spiers	David Croft and Jimmy Perry	14 December 1976
A pageant, written by Captain Ashwood, might offend the Indian assistant to the District Officer. Also starring Peter Greene and Jaron Yaltan.
30	8	"Twenty-One Today"	David Croft	David Croft and Jimmy Perry	28 December 1976
Gunner Parkin turns twenty-one. Sergeant Major Williams wants to give him a present. Also starring Ishaq Bux and Bobby Dennis.

=== Series 5 (1977) ===
No. overall	No. in series	Title	Produced & Directed by	Written by	Original release date
31	1	"Front Line Entertainers"	David Croft	David Croft and Jimmy Perry	25 October 1977
When the men get sent up the jungle, they find that some Australian soldiers have not vacated their camp, as was ordered. Also starring Edmund Pegge and Peter Cartwright. Note: The stock footage of the train at the beginning of this episode was taken from the 1975 documentary The World About Us: The Romance of Indian Railways.
32	2	"Bridge Over the River Hipong"	David Croft and Ray Butt	David Croft and Jimmy Perry	1 November 1977
While they are still having trouble adapting to the jungle, the members of the concert party get the task of building a bridge. Also starring Mohammad Shamsi.
33	3	"The Pay Off"	David Croft and Ray Butt	David Croft and Jimmy Perry	8 November 1977
The men of the Royal Artillery Concert Party put on a show for Burmese bandits. Also starring Gorden Kaye, Burt Kwouk and Norman Mitchell.
34	4	"Puddings from Heaven"	David Croft and Ray Butt	David Croft and Jimmy Perry	15 November 1977
When the men discover a way to get food dropped illegally, they get into trouble. The food (puddings) were meant for some senior officers. Also starring Ishaq Bux, Jonathan Cecil, Robert Gillespie, James Taylor and Saad Ghazi.
35	5	"The Superstar"	David Croft and Ray Butt	David Croft and Jimmy Perry	22 November 1977
The Concert Party members are made to feel redundant when a talented new arrival steals the limelight. Also starring Jeffrey Holland and Tim Barrett.
36	6	"The Eternal Quadrangle"	David Croft	David Croft and Jimmy Perry	29 November 1977
Gunner Parkin has fallen in love with a pretty Burmese girl from the local village – the same girl that Captain Ashwood and Sergeant Major Williams have been visiting. Then, Gunner Sugden has something to say. Also starring Fiesta Mei Ling and John A. Tinn. Note: This was the final episode in which Michael Bates starred as Rangi Ram; he died on 11 January 1978.

=== Series 6 (1978) ===
No. overall	No. in series	Title	Produced & Directed by	Written by	Original release date
37	1	"The Stars Look Down"	David Croft and Phil Bishop	David Croft and Jimmy Perry	23 October 1978
The men from the Concert Party get to act in an American war movie, but can they stomach the American view of the war? Also starring Ed Bishop, Freddie Earlle and Michael Halsey.
38	2	"The Big League"	David Croft and Phil Bishop	David Croft and Jimmy Perry	30 October 1978
After a drunken incident, the men try to make up with the local population by organizing a football match. Also starring David English, Ashwin Patel and Mohammad Shamsi.
39	3	"The Great Payroll Snatch"	David Croft and Phil Bishop	David Croft and Jimmy Perry	6 November 1978
When the men from the concert party are guarding the Army payroll, a local bandit leader tries to lure the Sergeant Major away from the camp. Also starring Burt Kwouk, Robert Lee and Michael Lomax.
40	4	"The Dhobi Wallahs"	David Croft and Phil Bishop	David Croft and Jimmy Perry	20 November 1978
Trapped behind enemy lines, the members of the concert party have to disguise themselves as dhobi wallahs. Also starring Denys Hawthorne and Saad Ghazi.
41	5	"Lead Kindly Light"	David Croft and Phil Bishop	David Croft and Jimmy Perry	27 November 1978
To ensure the very existence of the Concert Party the artists have to impress the area commander. Also starring Michael Bevis, Rupert Bates, Denis Bond, Fleur Chandler, John Quentin, Michael Sharvell-Martin and James Taylor.
42	6	"Holidays at Home"	David Croft and Phil Bishop	David Croft and Jimmy Perry	11 December 1978
Colonel Reynolds and Captain Ashwood are away, leaving the Sergeant Major to put them on a torturous thirsty jungle-survival course, and he puts them on a charge when writing a complaining note. Also starring Michael Bevis.
43	7	"Caught Short"	David Croft and Phil Bishop	David Croft and Jimmy Perry	18 December 1978
With money missing from the petty cash whilst the Colonel is away from camp, it falls to Captain Ashwood to solve the crime with many suspects to choose from. Also starring Derek Martin. Note: This was the final episode in which Babar Bhatti starred as Punkah Wallah Rumzan.

=== Series 7 (1980) ===
No. overall	No. in series	Title	Produced & Directed by	Written by	Original release date
44	1	"That's Entertainment?"	David Croft and John Kilby	David Croft and Jimmy Perry	17 October 1980
The Sergeant Major makes a decision guaranteed to cause uproar when he picks a Scottish audience to watch a special English performance. Also in attendance is an Entertainment Officer who is critiquing the performance of the Concert Party to determine its status. Also starring Peter Cellier, Jimmy Perry, Martin Cochrane, Robert McIntosh and Renu Setna.
45	2	"The Guinea Pigs"	David Croft and John Kilby	David Croft and Jimmy Perry	24 October 1980
The Concert Party are roped into testing a new anti-malaria drug. Also starring Michael Bevis, John D. Collins, Rikki Fulton and Denis Bond.
46	3	"Dog in the Manger"	David Croft and John Kilby	David Croft and Jimmy Perry	31 October 1980
Captain Ashwood falls victim to unwanted attention from a female officer. Also starring June Whitfield.
47	4	"The Great Broadcast"	David Croft and John Kilby	David Croft and Jimmy Perry	7 November 1980
The men get a chance to perform on Forces Radio. Also starring Geoffrey Beevers, John D. Collins, Hilda Fenemore and Robin Parkinson.
48	5	"Class of 1945"	David Croft and John Kilby	David Croft and Jimmy Perry	14 November 1980
In an effort to free themselves from the Sergeant Major, the men suggest that he apply for a commission. Also starring Glyn Houston.
49	6	"Star Commandos"	David Croft and John Kilby	David Croft and Jimmy Perry	21 November 1980
The Concert Party travels to the front. Also starring Henry McGee, Iain Rattray and John D. Collins. Note: When this series was repeated in 1982, the series eight episode "Aquastars" was incorrectly listed as being at the end of this series repeat run on 3 June 1982, instead of the episode "Star Commandos". "Aquastars" was thus listed three times in the Radio Times: on its original broadcast date, at the end of this repeat run, and correctly listed on 9 July 1982, when series eight was being repeated.

=== Series 8 (1981) ===
No. overall	No. in series	Title	Produced & Directed by	Written by	Original release date
50	1	"Gloria's Finest Hour"	David Croft and John Kilby	David Croft and Jimmy Perry	23 July 1981
A head injury changes Beaumont's personality, turning him into a fighting machine. Also starring Dennis Ramsden.
51	2	"Money Talks"	David Croft and John Kilby	David Croft and Jimmy Perry	30 July 1981
When Gunner Graham stands to inherit some money, everybody wants to give him financial advice. Also starring Eric Dodson.
52	3	"Aquastars"	David Croft and John Kilby	David Croft and Jimmy Perry	6 August 1981
A show on the river does not go the way it was planned. Also starring Eric Dodson, Roy Heather and Barry Cryer.
53	4	"The Last Warrior"	David Croft and John Kilby	David Croft and Jimmy Perry	13 August 1981
The Concert Party hear that Japan has surrendered and the War is over. One single Japanese soldier has not heard the news. Can the men from the Concert Party convince him to lay down his weapons? Also starring Nicholas McArdle and Gordon Salkilld.
54	5	"Never the Twain Shall Meet"	David Croft and John Kilby	David Croft and Jimmy Perry	20 August 1981
Now that the war is over, the natives return to their village. They want the men from the Concert Party to move out so that they can return to their homes. Sergeant Major Williams insists on dealing with them in a less than diplomatic fashion. Also starring Renu Setna and Ali Baba.
55	6	"The Long Road Home"	David Croft and John Kilby	David Croft and Jimmy Perry	27 August 1981
It's time for the men from the Concert Party to start the return journey to Britain. Everyone is supposed to have injections before setting off. The vaccine runs out before Lofty gets his jabs, so he has to stay behind when the others begin their journey. Also starring Ishaq Bux, Roger Whieldon, John D. Collins, Colin Haigh and Graham Hamilton.
56	7	"The Last Roll Call"	David Croft and John Kilby	David Croft and Jimmy Perry	3 September 1981
The men reach England and prepare for demobilisation. Also starring Bill Pertwee, Brenda Cowling, Ralph Morse, John Benfield, John Oxley, Jeffrey Segal, Arnold Peters and Stella Tanner.
