= All is Safely Gathered In =

- Dad's Army episode
- "I've got a real nice harvest spread for you; home-made pasties and potato wine." The platoon gather around the Marshall threshing machine after completing the final day of the harvest. The episode, filmed in 1972, authentically recreated a wartime harvest.
- Episode no.: Series 5 Episode 8
- Directed by: David Croft
- Story by: Jimmy Perry and David Croft
- Original air date: 24 November 1972
- Running time: 30 minutes

Episode chronology
← Previous "The King Was in His Counting House"	Next → "When Did You Last See Your Money?"

"All Is Safely Gathered In" is the eighth episode of the fifth series of the British comedy series Dad's Army. It was originally transmitted on 24 November 1972. The episode was a favourite episode of writer David Croft, which he described in an interview with Graham McCann as "a joyous thing".

== Synopsis ==
Private Godfrey requests leave to help an old flame gather in her harvest and Mainwaring, citing the harvest as vital to the war effort, offers the assistance of the platoon. Meanwhile, ARP Warden Hodges has a narrow escape from a falling bomb and, in a crisis of faith, decides to assist them.

== Plot ==
The platoon is energised by the arrival of a Tommy Gun, or 'Chicago piano' as an excited Pike prefers to call it. While the men combatively discuss who is to have first turn of it, Godfrey reveals he has a problem. In the office, assisted by Jones, he reveals the truth. More than forty years before, as a 'dandy young buck' he had become involved with a friend, a young woman working as a servant in a nearby great house. At first Mainwaring is naturally baffled as to the relevance of all this, but it turns out she had later married a farmer, and was now a widow, her fields needed harvesting (100 acres of wheat).

Mainwaring, inspired by a burst of patriotic fervour, decides to harness the platoon to help with the harvest. They quickly drive out to the farm to offer their assistance. Meanwhile, Warden Hodges has had a life-changing experience, having narrowly survived a bombing raid. He reveals that the German bomb had knocked the pint glass out of his hand, but not exploded. He attributes this to some form of higher destiny, and is now resolved to love his enemies, though "not Hitler of course", and having sought guidance from the Vicar, he decides to assist Captain Mainwaring in his work.

Corporal Jones is acquainted with the machinery, and demonstrates it to the rest of them as best he can. Walker and Wilson appear more interested in three land girls. With an uncharacteristic unity the wardens and Home Guard work together, in the process managing to overcome a number of problems and incidents, including Jones falling into the hopper and losing his trousers. After finally completing the job, they are delighted with their work. After consuming large amounts of potato wine in celebration, the platoon and wardens head outside for the Vicar to bless the harvest. However, the drink has turned them belligerent, and it descends into a mass brawl.

== Music ==
The harvesting scenes feature the march "Calling All Workers" by Eric Coates which was famous as the theme tune to the BBC Light Programme live music show Music While You Work. Other music includes Arthur Tracy's performance of Arthur Johnston & Johnny Burke's song "Pennies from Heaven" (1936) and Ralph Butler & Noel Gay's "Hey Little Hen", which was a hit circa 1941.

The title of the episode is a line from the harvest hymn "Come, ye thankful people, come" by Henry Alford, which is sung to George Job Elvey's tune St George. The platoon give a drunken performance of the hymn in the final part of the episode.

== Cast ==
- Arthur Lowe as Captain Mainwaring
- John Le Mesurier as Sergeant Wilson
- Clive Dunn as Lance Corporal Jones
- John Laurie as Private Frazer
- James Beck as Private Walker
- Arnold Ridley as Private Godfrey
- Ian Lavender as Private Pike
- Bill Pertwee as ARP Warden Hodges
- Brenda Cowling as Edwina Prentice
- Frank Williams as Vicar
- Edward Sinclair as Verger
- Colin Bean as Private Sponge
- April Walker as Judy, a Land Girl
- Tina Cornioli as Olive, a Land Girl
- Third unnamed and uncredited land girl who does not speak in the episode

== Notes ==
1. The episode features extensive location filming, including a full recreation of a wartime harvest. Location filming took place at a farm in Whitney Green near Thetford, Norfolk in the summer of 1972, and a large quantity of photographs survive from the shoot. The studio scenes were shot at BBC Television Centre on 3 November 1972 and the episode was broadcast on 24 November of the same year.
