= My Day (film) =

2019 British film

- Theatrical film poster
- Directed by: Ibrahim Miiro
- Written by: Shirley Day; Ibrahim Miiro
- Produced by: Robyn Fox; Ibrahim Miiro
- Starring: Hannah Laresa Smith; Mike Kinsey; Karl Jackson; Gediminas Adomaitis; Sallyann Fellowes; Daniel O'Meara
- Cinematography: George Burt; Martyna Knitter
- Edited by: Ibrahim Miiro
- Music by: Jonathon Deering
- Release date: September 25, 2019 (UK)
- Running time: 90 mins.
- Country: United Kingdom
- Language: English

My Day is a 2019 British gang drama-thriller film, directed, edited, and co-produced by Ibrahim Miiro, who also co-wrote with Shirley Day. The film stars Hannah Laresa Smith, Karl Jackson, Mike Kinsey, and Gediminas Adomaitis. It premiered in the UK in 2019.

== Cast ==
- Hannah Laresa Smith as Ally
- Karl Jackson as Kevin
- Mike Kinsey as Frank
- Gediminas Adomaitis as Ilyas
- Sallyann Fellowes as Carol
- Daniel O'Meara as Gary
- Jonas Cemm as Chris
- Jonathan Cobb as Nick

== Reception ==
Cath Clarke of The Guardian awarded the film 3/5 stars, calling it "a film bursting with energy and adrenaline".

Trent Neely of Battle Royale with Cheese praises the writers for "crafting a story that showcases real, flawed characters".

And WeirdlingWolf of Letterboxd rated it 3.5/5 stars, highlighting "sparky Hannah Laresa Smith's earnest, brightly engaging performance".
