= Dino Shafeek =

British Bangladeshi actor (1930–1984)

- Shafeek as Ali Nadim in Mind Your Language
- Born: Gholam D. Shafeek; 21 March 1930; Dacca, Bengal Province, British India
- Died: 10 March 1984 (aged 53); London, England
- Other names: Dino Shafeek; Dean Francis
- Citizenship: British
- Education: University of Dhaka; Guildhall School of Music and Drama
- Occupation: Actor
- Years active: 1967–1983
- Known for: Chai Wallah Muhammed in It Ain't Half Hot Mum (1974–1981), Ali Nadim in Mind Your Language (1977–1979)
- Partner: Leslie Didcock (engaged)

Dino Shafeek (born Gholam D. Shafeek, 21 March 1930 – 10 March 1984) was a British Bangladeshi actor specialising in comedy roles. Born and raised in Dhaka, he moved to the United Kingdom in 1958 and appeared in several sitcoms during the 1970s and early 1980s. He is best remembered for playing the part of Chai Wallah Muhammed in the BBC sitcom It Ain't Half Hot Mum and the role of Ali Nadim in ITV sitcom Mind Your Language.

== Career ==
Shafeek's first acting role was as an extra in the drama series Maigret in 1961 under the name Dean Francis, a name he used on occasion until 1966. Most of Shafeek's early roles were uncredited; his first role credited to "Dino Shafeek" was in 1967, when he appeared in two episodes of Softly, Softly as Anwar. He appeared as 'Akbar' in the film The Long Duel (1967), starring Yul Brynner.

One of Shafeek's biggest roles came in the show It Ain't Half Hot Mum as "Chaiwallah Muhammad". The series was broadcast by the BBC from 1974 to 1981 and starred Windsor Davies as the Battery sergeant-major of the troop's barracks in Deolali, Bombay Presidency. During the run of It Ain't Half Hot Mum, Shafeek played the part of student Ali Nadim in the ITV/London Weekend Television sitcom Mind Your Language (1977–1979).

Shafeek played character parts in films and TV, such as: Carry On Emmannuelle, Minder, Special Branch and The Onedin Line. His last role was in High Road to China starring Tom Selleck.

== Death ==
Shafeek died suddenly from a heart attack whilst at home, in London, with his fiancée, Leslie Didcock, on 10 March 1984, eleven days before his 54th birthday.

== Filmography ==
=== Film ===
Year	Title	Role	Notes
1964	Man in the Middle	Barman	Uncredited
1967	The Long Duel	Akbar	
1968	The Charge of the Light Brigade	Indian servant	
1972	Young Winston	Sikh Soldier	
1976	Queen Kong	Indian	Uncredited
1977	Stand Up, Virgin Soldiers	Indian watchman	
1978	Carry On Emmannuelle	Immigration Officer	
1983	High Road to China	Satvinda	(final film role)

=== Television ===
Year	Title	Role	Notes
1961	Maigret	Extra (as Dean Francis)	Episode "Love from Felicie" (uncredited)
1963	Ghost Squad	Waiter	Episode "Death of a Sportsman" (uncredited)
1963	The Desperate People	Man at nightclub	1 episode (uncredited)
1964	Danger Man	Club barman (as Dean Francis)	Episode "The Colonel's Daughter" (uncredited)
1964	Drama 61-67	Gunman (as Dean Francis)	Episode "Studio '64: The Crunch"
1964	The Midnight Men	Man at cafe (as Dean Francis)	Episode "Promise to Kill"
1964	Crane	Policeman (as Dean Francis)	Episode "Death Is a Closed Door"
1964	HMS Paradise	Indian delegate (as Dean Francis)	Episode "What Am I Offered for This Lot?"
1964	The Indian Tales of Rudyard Kipling	Sais, driver (as Dean Francis)	Episodes "Only a Subaltern", "The Bronckhurst Divorce Case"
1965	The Saint	Native	Episode "The Golden Frog" (uncredited)
1965	Out of the Unknown	Man in mask (as Dean Francis)	Episode "The Fox and the Forest"
1966	Redcap	Gurkha (as Dean Francis)	Episode "The Killer"
1966	Sergeant Cork	Servant	Episode "The Case of the Threatened Rajah" (uncredited)
1966	A Farewell to Arms	Passini (as Dean Francis)	Episode "The Summer There Were Many Victories"
1967	Softly, Softly	Anwar	Episodes "The Target: Part 1: Sighted", "The Target: Part 2: Point Blank"
1968	The Jazz Age	Abas	Episode "The Outstation"
1968	The Champions	Manservant	Episode "The Dark Island" (uncredited)
1969	The Troubleshooters	Abdhul	Episode "You're Not Going to Believe This, But..."
1969	Special Branch	Majid	Episode "The Promised Land"
1971	The Mind of Mr. J.G. Reeder	2nd priest	Episode "Man with a Strange Tattoo"
1971	Brett	Filegonia	Episode "The Day of the Dead"
1971	The Rivals of Sherlock Holmes	Ali	Episode "The Duchess of Wiltshire's Diamonds"
1974	...And Mother Makes Five	Gypsy	Episode "If I Can Help Somebody"
1974–1981	It Ain't Half Hot Mum	Chai Wallah Muhammed	56 episodes
1976	Centre Play	Demonstrator	Episode "Commonwealth Season: Trinidad – Home Sweet India"
1976	Down the 'Gate	The postman	Episode "The Lie"
1977	The Onedin Line	Juan	Episode "When Troubles Come"
1977	The Fuzz	1st Pakistani	Episode "Coppers Under the Sun"
1977–1979	Mind Your Language	Ali Nadim	29 episodes
1979	Hazell	Raiji	Episode "Hazell Bangs the Drum"
1980	Minder	Mini cab driver	Episode "All About Scoring, Innit?"
1981	Into the Labyrinth	Suleiman	Episode "Shadrach"
1982	The Stanley Baxter Hour	Various roles	Christmas special

=== Theatre ===
Year	Title	Role	Notes
1967	A Touch of Brightness	Pidku	Royal Court Theatre, London
1968	In the Penal Colony	The Prisoner	Arts Laboratory, Drury Lane, London; adaptation by Steven Berkoff
1970	To Anchor a Cloud	Asaf Khan	King George's Theatre, London
1971	Captain Brassbound's Conversion	Hassan	Cambridge Theatre, London
1977	A Clean Break	Anwar Hassan	Ravi Shankar Hall, London
1979	It Ain't Half Hot Mum	Chai Wallah Muhammad	Stage adaptation of TV series; regional tour commencing at Pier Theatre, Bournemouth
1980	Dick Whittington and His Cat		London Palladium, London
1981	Dick Whittington and His Cat		London Palladium, London
1982	Gandhi		Tricycle Theatre, Kilburn, London
1982	It Ain't Half Hot Mum	Chai Wallah Muhammad	Stage adaptation of TV series; regional tour commencing at Futurist Theatre, Scarborough
1982	Dick Whittington	Sultan of Morocco	Bristol Hippodrome, Bristol

== Discography ==
=== Albums ===
Year	Title	Label/Cat No	Notes
1975	It Ain't Half Hot Mum – Featuring the Artists from the Popular BBC-TV Series	EMI Records EMC 3074	Appears as Chai Wallah Muhammad
1983	Tony Fayne's Back	Rosie Records RR 008	Guest appearance

== See also ==
- British Pakistani
- List of British Pakistanis
