= Deolali transit camp =

British Army transit camp in India

- Near Deolali, Maharashtra in India

Site information
- Type: Transit camp, army depot
- Owner: India
- Operator: Indian Army

Location
- Coordinates: 19°53′28″N 73°49′27″E

Site history
- Built: 1861
- Built by: British Army

Deolali transit camp was a British Army transit camp in Maharashtra, India. Established in 1861, the camp remained in use throughout the time of the British Raj. It served to house soldiers newly arrived in the country and those awaiting ships to take them to Britain. It also housed a military prison and served as a prisoner of war camp during the First and Second World Wars. Conditions in the camp were said to be poor especially for those stationed there for long periods and the term "doolally" became associated with mental illness. The camp was transferred to the Indian Army following the independence of India.

== Transit camp ==
The camp was located near Deolali, Maharashtra, around 100 miles (160 km) north-east of Mumbai. The camp is situated near a prominent conical hill and the Bahula Fort. The British camp was established in 1861 as the Deolali Cantonment and was soon used as a transit camp, particularly for soldiers awaiting return to Britain. It was also used for training and acclimatisation for soldiers newly arrived in British India. New drafts would stay at the camp for up to several weeks carrying out route marches and close order drill to get used to the hotter climate. The camp is described as one of India's hill stations.

The camp was connected to the port at Mumbai by means of a railway, which was used for troop transport. During the First World War it was used as a hospital for prisoners of war held in other camps in India, including Turks taken prisoner on the Mesopotamian campaign and German soldiers. The camp had a military prison that was used for soldiers of the British Army and, during the Second World War, for captured Indian nationalists who had served in the Japanese-founded Indian National Army. During the Second World War the camp also boasted cinemas, swimming pools, amusement parks and restaurants for the troops.

The complex was transferred to the Indian Army after Indian Independence in 1947 and was used as an artillery school and depot for at least 10 artillery and service corps units. It also hosted an army records office and an aerial observation squadron. During the period leading up to independence the camp was known as the "Homeward Bound Trooping Depot" and was used to return large numbers of British troops and their families back home as British forces withdrew from the country.

The camp is the setting for the 1970s BBC comedy series It Ain't Half Hot Mum.

== Doolally ==
The soldiers' name for the camp, "Doolally", became a slang term associated with mental illness. The term is a contraction of the original form "Doolally tap", where the latter part is derived from "tapa" ("fever" in Hindustani and "heat" or "torment" in Sanskrit). The whole phrase is perhaps best translated as "camp fever". The term was in use from the late 19th century and the contracted form was dominant by the First World War.

It was said that soldiers at the camp, who often had a long wait for a troop ship back home, broke down from the heat of the long Indian summers. The ships only sailed between November and March so some men had to wait at the camp for months. Having been disarmed and allocated only light duties there was little to occupy the men. The camp was often full by the end of summer with soldiers awaiting troop ships; new arrivals in this period often had to sleep on the floor owing to a lack of beds and suffered from sand flea bites. Men were allowed to spend time in the nearby city of Nasik which offered numerous gin bars and brothels; as such venereal disease was common. Malaria, which can affect the brain, was also common in the Deolali area and remained a major issue for the British Army right through the Second World War despite the development of anti-malarial drugs. Suicides in the camp were not uncommon. Despite its reputation the Deolali area actually has a milder climate than nearby Mumbai or Pune, though it was known to be incredibly dusty in the period leading up to the monsoon.

The camp had a sanatorium (military hospital) but, despite its reputation, there was never a dedicated psychiatric hospital there. Cases of mental illness were instead confined to the military prison or sent to dedicated hospitals elsewhere in the country.
