= It Ain't Half Hot Mum =

British TV sitcom (1974–1981)

- Series title card (1974–75)
- Genre: Sitcom
- Created by: Jimmy Perry; David Croft
- Written by: Jimmy Perry; David Croft
- Directed by: David Croft; Graeme Muir; Bob Spiers; Ray Butt; Paul Bishop; John Kilby
- Starring: Michael Bates; Windsor Davies; George Layton; Melvyn Hayes; Don Estelle; Donald Hewlett; Michael Knowles; Christopher Mitchell; John Clegg; Stuart McGugan; Barbar Bhatti; Dino Shafeek; Kenneth MacDonald; Mike Kinsey; Andy Ho
- Theme music composer: Jimmy Perry
- Opening theme: "Meet the Gang"
- Ending theme: "Meet the Gang"; "Land of Hope and Glory"
- Country of origin: United Kingdom
- Original language: English
- No. of series: 8
- No. of episodes: 56 (2 missing) (list of episodes)

Production
- Producers: David Croft; Graeme Muir
- Running time: 30 minutes

Original release
- Network: BBC1
- Release: 3 January 1974 – 3 September 1981

It Ain't Half Hot Mum is a British television sitcom about a Royal Artillery concert party based in Deolali in British India and the fictional village of Tin Min in Burma, during the final months of the Second World War. It was written by Jimmy Perry and David Croft, who had both served in similar roles in India during that war.

Fifty-six episodes were broadcast across eight series on BBC1 between 1974 and 1981, most of which cover a real-time historical period of approximately thirteen weeks. Each episode ran for thirty minutes. The title originates from the first episode, in which young Gunner Parkin (Christopher Mitchell) writes home to his mother in England. In 1975, a recording of "Whispering Grass" performed by Don Estelle and Windsor Davies in character as Gunner "Lofty" Sugden and Sergeant Major Williams (respectively), reached number one on the UK singles chart and remained there for three weeks.

The series, which attracted up to seventeen million viewers in its heyday, has been accused of racism, homophobia, and a pro-imperialist attitude. One specific criticism has been the casting of Michael Bates, a white actor who was born in India and fluent in Urdu, as an Indian character, which required him to wear darkening makeup that some have compared to blackface.

== Premise ==
Set in 1945, the series follows a Royal Artillery concert party during the final months of the Second World War. The main characters are performers in the base's concert party; their duties involve performing comic acts and musical numbers (similar to those seen in a music hall) for other soldiers prior to their departure for the front lines. The concert party prevents the soldiers from partaking in combat duty; thus, the soldiers love being part of the outfit. Some even daydream of becoming world-famous actors when they leave the army.

Many songs of the era were performed by the cast in their re-enactment of wartime variety shows.

== Theme ==
The theme song for the show, titled "Meet The Gang", was performed by cast members Mike Kinsey, Stuart McGugan, Melvyn Hayes, George Layton, Christopher Mitchell, Don Estelle and Kenneth MacDonald who were filmed as they danced and sang the song on stage; close-up shots of the seven as well as shots of Michael Bates, Windsor Davies, John Clegg, Dino Shafeek and Barbar Bhatti (and other non-main actors who appeared in an episode) were inserted. When Layton left after series 2, the theme was re-filmed to only have Kinsey, McGugan, Hayes, Mitchell, Estelle and MacDonald on stage.

The theme was reshot again in series 5 when the concert party moved to Burma. Insert shots of Bates and Bhatti were removed from the opening and ending following Bates's death after series 5 and Bhatti's departure after series 6. Series 7 and 8 feature insert shots of Andy Ho, who played Ah Syn.

== Production ==
=== Development and casting ===
It Ain't Half Hot Mum is set in 1945 during the final months of the Second World War, in the period after the German surrender, when the Allies were attempting to finish the war by defeating Japan in Asia. The scripts make clear that the performers are members of a concert party of the Royal Artillery and are thus enlisted soldiers, rather than being members of ENSA. Initially, the British soldiers are stationed at the Royal Artillery Depot in Deolali, British India, where soldiers were kept before being sent to fight at the front lines. The series was based on the experiences of its creators during the Second World War; Jimmy Perry, aged nineteen, had been a member of a Royal Artillery concert party in Deolali, India, while David Croft had been an entertainments officer in Poona (now in the Indian state of Maharashtra).

The characters in the series were based on colleagues whom co-writer Jimmy Perry knew while stationed in Deolali as a Royal Artillery concert party member. Perry recalled: "I assure you that all those wonderful characters were based on real people in that concert party. They know who they are!" The character of Battery Sergeant Major Williams, played by Windsor Davies, was based on Perry's own battery sergeant major; according to Perry, Davies's character was less harsh than Perry's own sergeant had been.

George Layton left his previous show in which he wrote and starred, Doctor in Charge, to appear as Bombardier "Solly" Solomons in It Ain't Half Hot Mum. In 1975, after two series, Layton left to pursue other interests. Michael Bates, who played Indian bearer Rangi Ram, died after the fifth series had been broadcast. The part of chai wallah Muhammad, played by Dino Shafeek, was increased as a result.

=== Music ===
The theme song, "Meet the Gang", was written and composed by Jimmy Perry and Derek Taverner. Two singles were released, featuring songs performed in-character by Don Estelle and Windsor Davies. The first, "Whispering Grass", reached No. 1 in the British singles chart for three weeks from 7 June 1975. The second, "Paper Doll", reached No. 41 later that year. They also recorded a top 10 LP, titled Sing Lofty.

== Characters ==
=== Officers ===
- Lieutenant-Colonel Charles Arthur Digby St John Reynolds (Donald Hewlett)

Lieutenant-Colonel Reynolds is the most senior officer in charge of the concert party and enjoys their shows immensely. He thinks army life in Asia is very hard, while all he does is sit around sipping pink gin and dining with the elite. He is having an affair with Daphne Waddilove-Evans, whose husband, Major Waddilove-Evans, has left for the Punjab. He is a stereotypical British Army officer, with a "stiff upper lip" and prim and proper manner. Captain Ashwood's utter stupidity does occasionally infuriate him, but he is effectively good-natured and tries at all costs to avoid losing the easy life he has. Reynolds is revealed to be a solicitor in civilian life.

- Captain Jonathan Tarquin "Tippy" Ashwood (Michael Knowles)

Captain Ashwood is an even bigger fan of the concert party than Colonel Reynolds, especially when they dress up as girls. He is not very bright, and often unknowingly ruins other people's plans, especially the Sergeant Major's. His catchphrase is "It's a tricky one, sir", which he says in reply to Colonel Reynolds asking for his opinion when the concert party runs into a particular problem. He occasionally writes skits for the concert party, which they reluctantly accept, although they are, on the whole, of very low quality. He has absolutely no military bearing, which makes it very easy for the Sergeant Major and the others to manipulate him into using his authority to achieve their own ends. He is known for his stupidity, high-pitched voice, and love of gardening. He is exceptionally devoted to his wife, Fiona, though he does at one point have a fling with a local girl.

=== Warrant officer ===
- Battery Sergeant Major Tudor Bryn "Shut Up" Williams (Windsor Davies)

The Welsh Sergeant Major is the only professional soldier among the concert party and its officers. He is extremely bigoted in his views, making every effort to bully the Indian camp staff and remind everyone of British supremacy in Asia. He has only one goal in life: to get his soldiers posted up the jungle and into action as fast as he can. Williams has a cunning and fierce pirate-like look. He is disgusted that his soldiers "prance about" on the stage wearing dresses and make-up all the time, and frequently calls them a "lot of poofs". He is sometimes portrayed as a stereotypical "devious" Welshman, using cunning schemes to turn events in his favour. He dislikes all members of the concert party, apart from Parkin, whom he believes to be his son. He has a particular loathing for "Lah-Di-Dah" Gunner Graham, owing to Graham's university education, although Williams will praise him for it if it serves his purposes. Williams often mispronounces long words, turning "hysterical" into "historical" or "hysterectical", "sadistic" into "statistics", "misapprehension" into "mishappropriation", "education" into "heducation" and "ignorant" into "higorant". Williams also has a tendency to roar "Shut up!" when he hears something that meets his disapproval, hence his nickname, and is also remembered for his sarcastic remark, "Oh dear, how sad, never mind" invariably delivered in a flat monotone. He plans, when at some future time he should leave the army, to marry a widow who owns a pub.

(In one episode, a letter addressed to Gunner Parkin and intended to be opened only in the event of the Sergeant Major's death falls into the hands of the Concert Party, who read that he is only being hard on the men in order to turn them into soldiers, and he actually thinks that "they are all grand lads, especially little Lofty".)

There is inconsistency over Williams's full name. In the Series 3 episode "Don't Take the Micky", Williams's thoughts are broadcast and he uses the name Tudor Bryn Williams to refer to himself, but in the final episode he reads out the name on his newly issued ration book as "B.L. Williams".

=== Concert party ===
- Bombardier "Solly" Solomons (George Layton)

"Solly" is a showbiz man who always plays the male leads in the concert party's shows and is also the party's producer. He is very intelligent, and often has some sort of devious plot to avoid being posted or to get one over on the Sergeant Major. His father was a pawnbroker in Bond Street, and he is Jewish. He leaves at the end of Series 2 when he is demobbed and returns to England.

- Gunner/Bombardier "Gloria" Beaumont (Melvyn Hayes)

"Gloria" Beaumont is a very effeminate person who cannot handle the violence, heat and mosquitoes of army life in India very well. He considers himself an "artiste", and does not believe he should be in the Army, often trying to emphasise his show business angle and ignore the "soldier" parts of his job. He has a passion for show business and always dresses up as famous film stars during the concert party shows, especially Ginger Rogers. He was later promoted to Bombardier when Bombardier Solomons was demobbed. Despite Beaumont's effeminacy, he meets a nurse in the episode "Ticket to Blighty" and they announce they are to be wed. However, no more is heard of this plot line.

- Gunner Nigel "Parky" Parkin (Christopher Mitchell)

"Parky" is the youngest member of the concert party and has tried everything to become part of them, including being a ventriloquist, comedian, and singer, although he is very clumsy and never does anything right. The Sergeant Major falsely believes that Parkin is his son (Williams had a relationship with Parkin's mother Edith in Colchester, which is why he treats him much better than he treats the others, and keeps telling him he has "a fine pair of shoulders"). He is not Williams' son, but when the rest of the concert party discover what the Sgt Major believes, Parkin is welcomed into the party, for the Sgt Major would want to stop it being sent into battle as long as Parkin is a member. In an early episode, the party get hold of Williams' and Parkin's medical records; they discover that Parkin's blood group O and Williams' is AB, so Parkin cannot be his son, but they alter the record of Parkin's blood group so that Williams will still believe he is his son. Consequently, Williams becomes very selective about Parkin's achievement – praising him when he does something right and ignoring the failure when he makes huge blunders. Lacking any talent as a putative entertainer in the concert party Parkin is appointed as the Battery Clerk, but misunderstands orders. Sergeant-Major Williams instructs him to "remove the mess by the Officers' lines", referring to a pile of old beds that were to be discarded. Instead, Parkin proceeds to have the Officer's Mess demolished. Later, Colonel Reynolds tells him to order 200 tent pegs, and he instead orders 200 tents.

Comedy historian Robert Ross describes Parky as being a "beloved staple of the show", whose naivety, dim-wittedness misunderstandings and letters home to his mother "humanised" the show's comedy. Ross wrote that Parky's relationship with Sergeant Major Williams gave the series "real heart".

Parkin references the show's title in its first episode, when he signs off a letter to his mother with the words "I've been in India now two days, and it ain't half hot, Mum." He was born on 2 October 1924, and celebrates his 21st birthday at the end of Series 4, in the episode "Twenty-One".

- "La-De-Dah" Gunner "Paderewski" Jonathan Graham (John Clegg)

Gunner Graham is the concert party's pianist. His appearance – bald and bespectacled – marks him out as a stereotypical "boffin". He has a university degree in English literature (in early episodes, he claims to have attended Oxford, but later this is changed to Cambridge). He is very clever, speaking in an educated manner. This is why the Sergeant Major frequently repeats what he says in an exaggeratedly effete tone, as well as mockingly addressing him as "Mister La-De-Dah Gunner Graham". Graham often produces difficult and ingenious plans to solve the concert party's problems, but these plans never seem to work and often result in him saying "Oh well, bang goes that theory." The others (even the Sergeant Major and the officers) often rely on his intelligence to get them out of awkward situations.

- Gunner "Atlas" Mackintosh (Stuart McGugan)

"Atlas" Mackintosh (nicknamed after the bodybuilder Charles Atlas) performs the strong man act in the show, which involves tearing telephone directories in half. He is rather short-tempered, especially when Beaumont calls him a "great, big, butch, hairy haggis". He is very masculine, and is a bit of a contradiction to what Beaumont thinks is right for the concert party. Nevertheless, Mackintosh always tries his best and copes with what is given to him.

- Gunner "Lofty" Harold Horace Herbert Willy Sugden (Don Estelle)

"Lofty" is a soldier whose appearance can be summarised by quoting the Sergeant Major: "Is it a mushroom? No. Is it a soldier? No. It's Gunner Sugden." Lofty is the diminutive, rotund lead singer of the concert party usually seen in an old-fashioned pith helmet. He has an amazing tenor voice, which even the Sergeant Major cannot resist when he sings. Unfortunately, he is always picked out by the Sergeant Major as a "volunteer" when there is a particularly unpleasant or dangerous task to be carried out. He has been married three times; his two previous wives were called Agatha and Betty. Sugden's third and present wife is mentioned as sharing a house with Betty.

- Gunner "Nosher" Evans (Mike Kinsey)

"Nosher" Evans does a paper-tearing act. He is always eating something (and once stayed on punishment in the canteen for four hours after he was relieved, as he was enjoying himself); this results in him spraying the contents of his mouth all around him when he speaks. According to actor Mike Kinsey, his character originally did not have a nickname however when David Croft saw him eating pie and chips during break he looked at Kinsey and said "I know the name for you now; Nosher".

- Gunner "Nobby" Clark (Kenneth MacDonald)

"Nobby" Clark performs a whistling act in the show, and can do excellent bird impersonations. He is not particularly clever and often makes nonsense comments or observations about situations in which they find themselves.

=== Indians ===
- Bearer Rangi Ram (Michael Bates)

Rangi Ram is the concert party's Indian bearer and very proud to be of service to the army. The Sergeant Major shouts at him more than at anyone else, but Rangi is also the one he confides in when he wants to talk about problems. Rangi often breaks the fourth wall, providing the audience with an "old Hindu proverb" at the end of each episode, such as "There is an old Hindu proverb which say that if you see two eyes looking at you in the dark, it is not always a tiger. It might be two one-eyed tigers!" He is devious, and can often manipulate the situation for his own ends, usually financial. A frequently recurring gag connected with Rangi Ram is his continual references to "we British" and "us British" while at the same time referring to the other Indian characters as "ignorant coolies" or "damned natives". However, when asked to burn the Indian flag by the Sergeant Major, he refuses. He frequently clears his throat with a hacking sound. Following the death of Michael Bates, Rangi disappears from the series without explanation at the end of Series 5.

- Chai Wallah Muhammad (Dino Shafeek)

Muhammed the char wallah walks around the camp all day, selling tea from his urn. He also sings the musical interruptions between the scenes, which are mostly American hit songs, accompanied by a sitar. At the end of the credits, he starts to sing "Land of Hope and Glory" only to be interrupted by the Sergeant Major shouting "SHUT UP!!!". After Rangi leaves, he takes on the role of Bearer to the concert party, as well as still being the Char Wallah.

- Punkah Wallah Ramzan (Barbar Bhatti)

Ramzan the punkah wallah always sits outside the officers' quarters, pulling a string that is attached to a large fan indoors. He comments on everything in Urdu, and always adds a few words in English at the end. Rangi often tells him to "sit up straight while you are punkah-ing" (with the word "sit" pronounced with an initial "sh" sound for comedic effect) and not to "be such Clever Dickie". He is far more intelligent than the others give him credit for, and much of what he observes early on is often borne out in the end, but no one notices. He disappears without explanation at the end of Series 6.

=== Others ===
==== Deolali, India ====
- Mrs Daphne Waddilove-Evans (Margaret Courtenay/Frances Bennett)

Mrs Waddilove-Evans is the wife of a local major, who lives in a large house near the camp in Deolali. In the earlier episodes, she is the lover of Colonel Reynolds; the two have a strong relationship, to the point when she accompanies the patrol on a journey to a nearby town. However, the group's vehicle breaks down and Rangi recommends that they spend the night in a nearby fort. The Colonel and Mrs Waddilove-Evans agree to meet at midnight and they do so. As Colonel Reynolds is distracted, Mrs Waddilove-Evans is kidnapped by a group of Pathan tribesmen and the concert party, Rangi, Muhammed and Rumzan attempt to save her. They are surprised when they meet her on a horse further on, having gained her freedom. It is implied that she escaped by granting sexual favours to the smugglers.

- Ling Soo (Yasuko Nagazumi)

Ling Soo is a local girl who works as a maid for Major and Mrs Waddilove-Evans. She and Sergeant Major Williams have a continuing relationship. Her father, the owner of the Deolali Chinese restaurant, arranges for Williams and Ling Soo to elope to the mountains and marry secretly. This horrifies Williams, for he would be classed as a deserter, and creates a dilemma for him; should he stay on at the camp, or should he marry Ling Soo? Eventually he reluctantly chooses his profession, and his relationship is not mentioned again.

- Inspector Singh (Nik Zaran)

The Inspector is the head of police in Deolali, who warns Colonel Reynolds and Captain Ashwood on a few occasions when the locals are rioting, demanding that the British go home.

==== Tin Min, Burma ====
- "Pretty Boy" Me Thant (Burt Kwouk)

Me Thant is a Burmese smuggler, who is bribed by GHQ with twenty pieces of gold a week to keep away from, and avoid assaulting, the local British troops. Later on, he challenges Sergeant Major Williams to a test to see which of the two is more "manly". Me Thant cheats to make sure he wins the test, but his gang is infiltrated by members of GHQ, resulting in him and his gang being tied against a small plank, "Burmese style".

- Ah Syn (Andy Ho)

Ah Syn is the cook for the camp later in the series, a man of Chinese ethnicity who served food that Captain Ashwood describes as "furniture stuffing". Gunner Graham in particular moans that the food is inedible and disgusting. When Captain Ashwood asks if he knows about spotted dick and toad in the hole, he misunderstands entirely and thinks that spotted dick is an illness.

== Episodes ==
The series ran for eight series from 1974 to 1981. Each series had between six and eight episodes. In total, there were 56 episodes, and each had a duration of 30 minutes.

=== Missing episodes ===
Two episodes from the first series, "A Star is Born" and "It's a Wise Child", are currently missing from the BBC Archives, since they were wiped after their repeat broadcasts. In 1988, two off-air VHS recordings of the missing episodes were discovered in Australia by Dave Homewood, the founder of the New Zealand branch of the Dad's Army Appreciation Society. They had been recorded from Australian broadcasts on Channel 7; however, they are incomplete, since Channel 7 edited certain scenes from the episodes so that they would fit within the channel's timeslot. An estimated four minutes has been edited from these episodes.

== Reception ==
=== Contemporary reception ===
It Ain't Half Hot Mum attracted up to seventeen million viewers during its run.

American actor John Wayne was filming in London in 1974, and caught an episode on television. Unimpressed with what he was seeing, he is reported to have said: "Well, at least the guy playing the sergeant-major has a great voice".

Spike Milligan is reported to have considered Windsor Davies' performance the most comedic he had seen.

=== Criticisms of racism and homophobia ===
Unlike other sitcoms written by Perry and Croft, such as Dad’s Army, the series does not get repeated by the BBC, as it is regarded as differing from modern broadcasting standards concerning its content. In 2014, Ed Richards, then chief executive of Ofcom, said 1970s and 1980s sitcoms with racist and offensive content "are unimaginable today", with viewers objecting to such broadcasts. The Daily Telegraph specified It Ain't Half Hot Mum as one of the shows to which he was referring.

Perry told Guardian journalist Stuart Jeffries in 2003, "It is without doubt the funniest series that David Croft and I wrote. Of course, it is also the show that we're not allowed to talk about any more." Jeffries reported, "It's regarded as a racist show, and banished to the televisual margin that is UK Gold". In the opinion of journalist Neil Clark, for a profile of Perry written for The Daily Telegraph a decade later, it "appears to have fallen victim to political correctness". Clark maintains that the show is a classic of the sitcom genre.

The casting of the white actor Michael Bates as the Indian bearer Rangi Ram has been described as an example of blackface. In the 2013 Daily Telegraph interview, Perry rejected the accusation that Bates "blacked-up", saying "all he wore was a light tan". David West Brown wrote, in English and Empire, that the case for Bates' character rests on an assumption that his "dramatic and social functions are not derogatorily comic in the way that depictions of African diaspora identities are" in a series like The Black and White Minstrel Show. The BBC website article about the series describes Bates as having "blacked up". The show's creators had been aware of the issues around the casting of a white actor wearing darkening makeup to play one of the Indian characters, but went ahead owing to the creators' belief that there was a lack of suitable Indian actors at the time. In his 2013 Daily Telegraph interview, Perry defended the casting, commenting that Bates, who was born in India to English parents, "spoke fluent Urdu, and was a captain in the Gurkhas". Comedian and actor Sanjeev Bhaskar stated in a 2010 interview: "I've always felt that the criticism of him was too simplistic. Michael Bates was a very funny actor ... and had great comic timing. Rather than race it was really about the class differences between the officer toffs and the sergeant major. [Bates's character] Randhi was like Bilko, he had the quick lines and I never felt that he was taking the mickey out of Indians."

Perry told an interviewer from Radio Times in 2014 about this rejection: "You might as well be in Stalin's Russia. You don't want to upset anyone". Jeffries asked Perry about the exchanges between the Battery Sergeant Major and the troupe, which went "You're a load of poofs! What are you?", followed by the standard response "We're a load of poofs!". Perry commented: "People complain that the language was homophobic, and it was, but it was exactly how people spoke." He referred to the behaviour of his own Sergeant Major in the concert party in India, who told them: "'No man who puts on make-up and ponces about on a stage is normal – what are you?' 'We're a bunch of poofs!' we'd reply".

Of the depiction of the Melvyn Hayes character 'Gloria' Beaumont, Croft told interviewer Simon Morgan-Russell that the character "never expressed any interest in other males" and, in fact, "was a transvestite, not a homosexual".

The series' overall tone of sympathy towards imperialism is believed to be at least partly responsible for it being no longer repeated on British television in later years, along with, according to Darren Lee writing for the British Film Institute's Screenonline website, a belief that it contains "national stereotyping and occasionally patronising humour", or in the words of Stuart Jeffries in 2015, it contained "obliging underlings sporting cheerful grins that, even when I was a boy, made me cringe." A. A. Gill wrote in The Sunday Times in 2013, "Rather than being satirical, or dramatic, or even a parable, it relied solely on English prejudice and nostalgia". According to Mark Duguid, again for Screenonline, it suffers "from its narrow stereotypes of its handful of Indian supporting characters as alternately servile, foolish, lazy or devious". Neil Clark, in a 2005 article for The Times, said the series "delightfully lampooned the attitudes of the British in India". Its criticisms have not stopped it appearing in retrospectives.

Concerning the issues with It Ain't Half Hot Mum, Alex Massie wrote in January 2019, shortly after the death of Windsor Davies, that "even when judged by modern standards" the series is a "relatively minor offender when compared with programmes" such as Mind Your Language, Love Thy Neighbour and Curry and Chips.

On 16 June 2023, the series began repeats on That's TV. The intention was to screen all episodes of the series (including those retrieved from off-air recordings) in their complete broadcast form, without editing any potentially offensive material.

== Home releases ==
All eight series have been released on DVD region codes 2 and 4. A complete collection box set, containing all eight series of the sitcom, was released on 4 October 2010 in Region 2 and re-released in 2018. No complete series boxset has been released in Australia, Region 4.

The missing episodes of the first series ("A Star is Born" and "It's a Wise Child"), although not of broadcast quality, are included as special features on both the first series DVD and the complete collection box set.

DVD title	Code	No. of discs	Year	No. of episodes	Release date	
DVD title	Code	No. of discs	Year	No. of episodes	Region 2	Region 4
Complete Series 1	CCTV 30213	1	1974	8	5 September 2005	2 March 2006
Complete Series 2	CCTV 30227	1	1975	8	10 October 2005	5 October 2006
Complete Series 3	CCTV 30269	1	1976	6	13 February 2006	7 March 2007
Complete Series 4	CCTV 30295	2	1976	8	1 May 2006	5 September 2007
Complete Series 5	CCTV 30328	1	1977	6	31 July 2006	5 March 2008
Complete Series 6	BBCDVD 2645	1	1978	7	9 June 2008	4 September 2008
Complete Series 7	BBCDVD 3008	1	1980	6	24 August 2009	3 September 2009
Complete Series 8	BBCDVD 3047	1	1981	7	5 October 2009	4 March 2010
Complete Series 1–4	CCTV 30532	5	1974–1976	30	30 October 2006	—N/a
Complete Series 1–8	BBCDVD3329	9	1974–1981	56	4 October 2010	—N/a

== See also ==
- Entertainments National Service Association (ENSA)
- Desert Mice (1959)
- Privates on Parade (1982 film)
