= Michael Bates (actor) =

British actor (1920–1978)

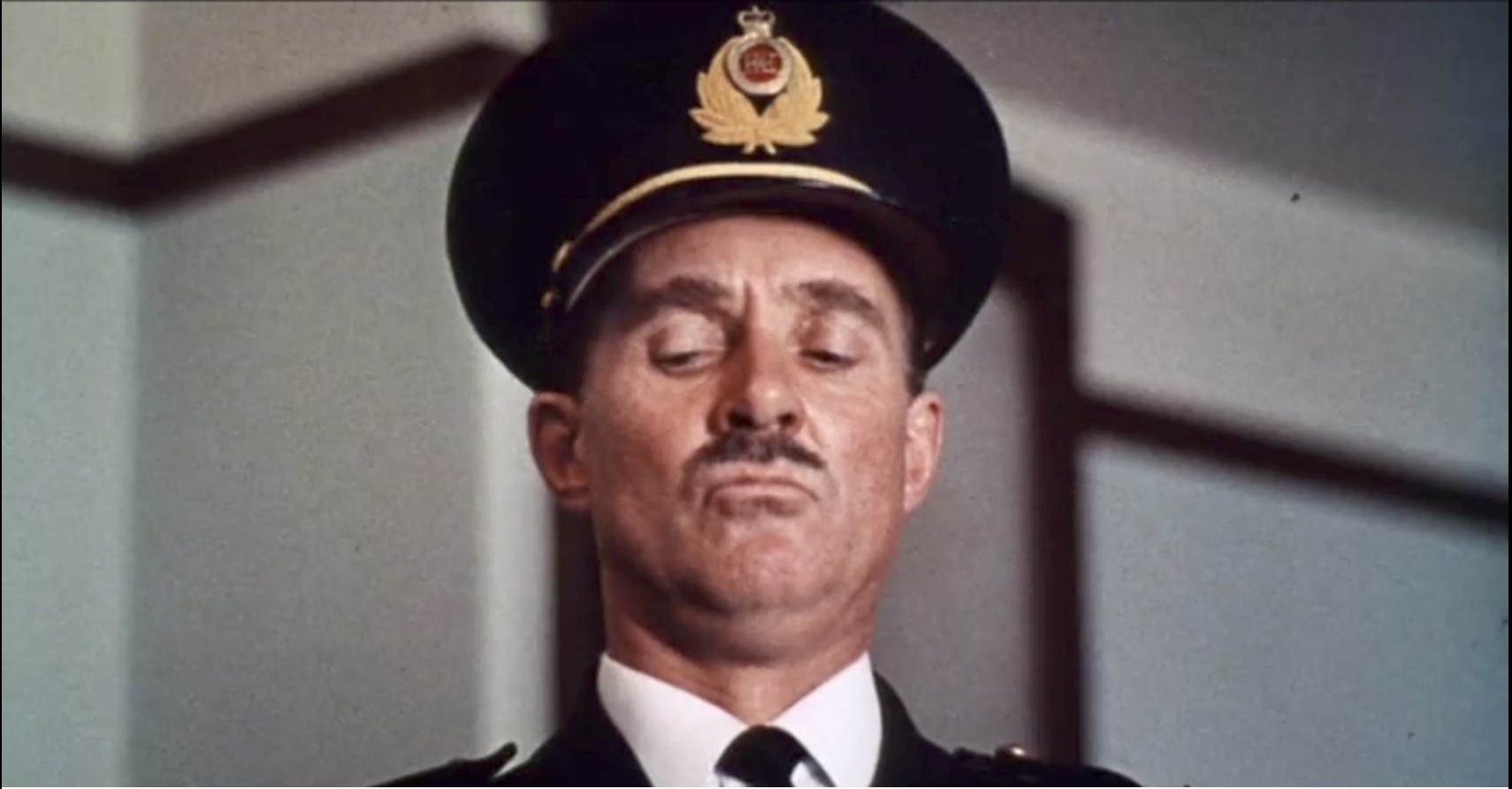
- Bates in A Clockwork Orange (1971)
- Born: Michael Hammond Bates; 4 December 1920; Jhansi, United Provinces, British India (present-day Uttar Pradesh, India)
- Died: 11 January 1978 (aged 57); Chelsea, London, England
- Citizenship: United Kingdom
- Education: St Catharine's College, Cambridge
- Occupation: Actor
- Years active: 1953–1977
- Spouse: Margaret M. J. Chisholm (m. 1954)
- Children: 3
- Military career
- Allegiance: India
- Branch: British Indian Army
- Rank: Major
- Commands: 3rd Battalion, 9th Gurkha Rifles
- Conflicts: World War II

Michael Hammond Bates (4 December 1920 – 11 January 1978) was a British actor, born in colonial India. He was best known for his roles as Field Marshall Sir Bernard Law Montgomery in Patton (1970), Guard Barnes in A Clockwork Orange (1971), Cyril Blamire in Last of the Summer Wine (1973–1975) and Rangi Ram in It Ain't Half Hot Mum (1974–1977).

== Early life ==
Bates was born in Jhansi, United Provinces, British Raj (present-day Uttar Pradesh, India). His parents were of Cheshire families; his father, Henry Stuart "Harry" Bates (16 March 1893 – 1 September 1985), son of Albert Bates (born 1868), of Congleton, Cheshire, was educated at Denstone School and Cambridge University before entering the Indian Civil Service in 1920. He served as Deputy Secretary of the Revenue Department and a Member of the Board of Revenue for the United Provinces of India until 1947 (in which year he was created Order of the Star of India (CSI) and was later of the Colonial Office. Bates's mother, Sarah Clarke Walker (19 June 1896 – 24 November 1982) was daughter of William Hammond Walker (1851 – 19 May 1904), also of Congleton.

Having been sent home to England aged seven by his parents, Bates was educated at Uppingham School and his father's alma mater, St Catharine's College, Cambridge. He was commissioned in the Indian Army in March 1942. During the Second World War he served in the Burma Campaign as a major with the 3rd Battalion, The 9th Gurkha Rifles, and was mentioned in dispatches in 1944.

== Career ==
In 1953, while an ensemble member with the Stratford Festival in Stratford, Ontario, Canada, Bates appeared in Richard III and All's Well That Ends Well.

In 1956, Bates appeared in Hotel Paradiso (L'Hôtel du libre échange), which starred Alec Guinness, at the Winter Garden Theatre in London. On radio, he played a variety of characters in the BBC's long-running comedy series The Navy Lark, including Able Seaman Ginger, Lieutenant Bates, Rear Admiral Ironbridge, the Military padre, and Captain Ignatius Aloysius Atchison.

Bates appeared in many British television series, including Last of the Summer Wine from 1973 to 1975 (as Cyril Blamire) and It Ain't Half Hot Mum from 1973 to 1977 (as Rangi Ram).

Bates's film roles include Bedazzled (1967) as the flirtatious police inspector, Here We Go Round the Mulberry Bush (1967) as Mr. McGregor, Battle of Britain (1969) as Warrant Officer Warwick, Oh! What a Lovely War (1969) as a Lance-Corporal, Patton (1970) as Field Marshal Sir Bernard Montgomery (to whom he bore a striking resemblance), A Clockwork Orange (1971) and Frenzy (1972). On stage, he played Shakespearean roles at Stratford and at the Old Vic and made a big impression as Inspector Truscott in the West End production of Loot by Joe Orton in 1966.

== Personal life ==
In 1954, Bates married Margaret M. J. Chisholm. They had three children. He was a supporter of the Conservative Party. Peter Sallis described Bates as being "slightly to the right of Thatcher" politically and said that Bates's right-wing opinions contrasted so sharply with the left-wing views of fellow Last of the Summer Wine star Bill Owen that the series was almost not made because of their arguments.

Bates died of cancer on 11 January 1978 at the Royal Marsden Hospital in Chelsea, London, aged 57. Bates had reportedly started to suffer from a rapid health decline around eighteen months before his death. He died shortly after the fifth series of It Ain't Half Hot Mum had been broadcast; his character was written out of the show with no explanation.

== Brownface allegations ==
Bates's role as Rangi Ram in It Ain't Half Hot Mum led to the allegation that he had performed in brownface. Series co-creator Jimmy Perry told Stuart Jeffries in 2003 that they had been unable to find a suitable Asian actor. "But Michael was ideal for the role", Perry said. Interviewed by the journalist Neil Clark for The Daily Telegraph in 2013, Perry said that all Bates wore "was a light tan. He wasn't blacked up! Michael spoke fluent Urdu, and was a captain in the Gurkhas". The show is not repeated in the UK by the BBC, which uses the "blacked up" description of Bates's performance in its website's article about the series. The series has been repeatedly shown on the UK channel That's TV since the summer of 2023, with an on-screen 'disclaimer' at the beginning of each episode reminding viewers that it contains language and attitudes reflecting the era in which it was made.

== Selected filmography ==
=== Film roles ===
- Carrington V.C. (1955) – Major Broke-Smith
- Dunkirk (1958) – Froome
- I'm All Right Jack (1959) – Bootle
- Bedazzled (1967) – Inspector Clarke
- Here We Go Round the Mulberry Bush (1968) – Mr. McGregor
- Hammerhead (1968) – Andreas / Sir Richard
- Don't Raise the Bridge, Lower the River (1968) – Dr. Spink
- Salt and Pepper (1968) – Inspector Crabbe
- Oh! What a Lovely War (1969) – Drunk Lance Corporal
- Battle of Britain (1969) – Warrant Officer Warwick
- Arthur? Arthur! (1969) – Mr. Harrington
- Patton (1970) – Field Marshal Sir Bernard Montgomery
- Every Home Should Have One (1970) – Magistrate
- The Rise and Rise of Michael Rimmer (1970) – Mr. Spimm
- A Clockwork Orange (1971) – Chief Guard Barnes
- Frenzy (1972) – Sergeant Spearman
- No Sex Please, We're British (1973) – Mr. Needham
- Fall of Eagles (1974) – General Erich Ludendorff
- The Bawdy Adventures of Tom Jones (1976) – Madman
- Gulliver's Travels (1977) – (voice)

=== Television roles ===
Year	Title	Role	Notes
1953	The Appleyards	Mr. Crump	Episode: "The Problem of Joe"
1955-1958	ITV Television Playhouse	Captain Alan Gerard/Sergeant Grey	2 episodes
1955-1958	BBC Sunday Night Theatre	Maxwell Oliver/Starveling	2 episodes
1957	Television World Theatre	Bardulph/Williams	Episode: "The Life of Henry V"
1958	Dixon of Dock Green	Jimmy	Episode: "A Little Bit of Luck"
1958	Ivanhoe	Will the Simple	Episode: "The Raven"
1958	Saturday Playhouse	Gregory Lupton/Colonel Lukyn	2 episodes
1959	World Theatre	Old Colonel	Episode: Mother Courage and Her Children
1959	The Four Just Men	Corporal Bates	Episode: "The Deserter"
1960	No Hiding Place	Alec Peters	Episode: "Three Small Bones"
1960	Boyd Q.C.	Dr. Attard	Episode: "The Little Man"
1960-1966	Emergency Ward 10	Joe Watson/James Wilberforce	9 episodes
1961	ITV Play of the Week	Lieutenant-Commander Richard Stanford	Episode: "The Flashing Stream"
1962	Tales of Mystery	Arthur Vezin	Episode: "Ancient Sorceries"
1963	The Saint	Joe	Episode: "The Fellow Traveller"
1965	Thursday Theatre	Tommy	Episode: "Photo Finish"
1965	Cluff	Inspector Mole	Series 2
1965-1970	BBC Play of the Month	Professor Godbole/Ronald Storrs	2 episodes
1966	Theatre 625	Shpichelsky	Episode: "A Month in the Country"
1966-1969	The Wednesday Play	Mike MacFarland/Joe	2 episodes
1968	Man in a Suitcase	Delacroix	Episode: "Blind Spot"
1968	ITV Playhouse	Mr. Ambekar/Harold Radcliff	2 episodes
1968	Armchair Theatre		Episode: "The Escape Club"
1968-1973	Comedy Playhouse	Antrobus/Cyril Blamire	2 episodes
1969	The Mind of Mr. J.G. Reeder	Ras Lal Punjabi	Episode: "Sheer Melodrama"
1969-1972	ITV Saturday Night Theatre	Various	3 episodes
1970	NBC Experiment in Television	Eustace Cartwright	Episode: "The Engagement"
1970	Oh In Colour		1 episode
1970-1971	Mr Digby Darling	Norman Stanhope	6 episodes
1970-1973	Thirty-Minute Theatre	Captain Gambell/Mr. Lightfoot	2 episodes
1971	Man at the Top	Tom Binsey	Episode: "Too Good for This World"
1971	Six Dates with Barker	Gasman / Patient	Episode: "1971: Come in and Lie Down"
1971	The Misfit	Sgt. Wilfreds	Episode: "On Arrivals and Departures and Things in Between"
1971	Play for Today	Arthur	Episode: "The Fox Trot"
1971	Jason King	Edward	Episode: "As Easy as A.B.C."
1971	The Rivals of Sherlock Holmes	Colonel Sandstream	Episode: "The Assyrian Rejuvenator"
1972	Budgie	Minces Nutty	Episode: "Louie the Ring is Dead and Buried in Kensal Green Cemetery"
1972	Lollipop Loves Mr Mole	Mr. Christmas	Episode: "It's Only Natural Gas"
1972	Public Eye	George (Shopkeeper / Retired policeman)	Episode: "Horse and Carriage"
1972	The Stone Tape	Eddie Holmes	TV film
1973–1975	Last of the Summer Wine	Cyril Blamire	Series 1-2
1974	Fall of Eagles	Von Ludendorff	2 episodes
1974	The Dick Emery Show	Horace Toombs/Veedo	2 episodes
1974–1977	It Ain't Half Hot Mum	Bearer Rangi Ram	Series 1-5
1975	Comedy Premiere	Reg Forrester	Episode: "Honey"
