= Hound-Dog Man =

- Directed by: Don Siegel
- Screenplay by: Fred Gipson; Winston Miller
- Based on: novel by Fred Gipson
- Produced by: Jerry Wald
- Starring: Fabian; Stuart Whitman; Carol Lynley; Arthur O'Connell
- Cinematography: Charles G. Clarke
- Edited by: Louis Loeffler
- Music by: Cyril J. Mockridge
- Production company: A Company of Artists
- Distributed by: 20th Century Fox
- Release date: November 1959
- Running time: 87 minutes
- Country: United States
- Language: English
- Budget: $1,045,000

Hound-Dog Man is a 1959 American musical comedy drama film directed by Don Siegel, based on the 1947 novel by Fred Gipson, and starring Fabian, Carol Lynley, and Stuart Whitman.

== Plot ==
In 1912, Clint McKinney and his younger brother Spud talk their father Aaron into letting them go on a hunting trip with their older friend, the womanizing Blackie Scantling. Aaron agrees despite the reluctance of his wife Cora.

== Cast ==
- Fabian as Clint McKinney
- Stuart Whitman as Blackie Scantling
- Carol Lynley as Dony Wallace
- Arthur O'Connell as Aaron McKinney
- Dodie Stevens as Nita Stringer
- Betty Field as Cora McKinney
- Royal Dano as Fiddling Tom Waller
- Margo Moore as Susie Bell Payson
- Claude Akins as Hog Peyson
- Edgar Buchanan as Doc Cole
- Jane Darwell as Grandma Wilson
- L.Q. Jones as Dave Wilson
- Virginia Gregg as Amy Waller
- Dennis Holmes as Spud McKinney
- Rachel Stephens as Rachel Wilson

As of December 18, 2020, only one of the three principal players, Fabian, is still alive.

== Original novel ==
Hound Dog Man
- Author: Fred Gipson
- Language: English
- Genre: coming of age
- Publisher: Harper and Brothers
- Publication date: 1949
- Publication place: USA

The original book was published in 1949, seven years before Gipson's better known Old Yeller (1956).

Gipson said when he started writing he intended it to be "a short semi fact article for a men's magazine" but that it "just grew and grew. I was writing about real people straight out of my childhood and I couldn't seem to get them stopped and finally wound up with a complete novel." He started it in 1944, put it aside, and returned to it in 1946. It was originally called Clipped Wings. It was finished in 1947 and published in 1949. The book sold well and was published in a number of languages.

Gipson said reaction to the novel "was sometimes gratifying and sometimes bewilderingly unpleasant... It was just a book of little boys on a coon hunt."

It would remain Gipson's favorite book among his own works. He tried to write a sequel but was unable to finish it.

Don Siegel, who directed the film, called it "a delightful, funny book... I loved its simplicity."

== Production ==
=== Development ===
In 1952 Ida Lupino expressed interest in obtaining the film rights, as a possible vehicle for Robert Mitchum.

In 1955 Filmmakers Inc announced they would make the film along with an adaptation of The Quick and the Dead.

20th Century Fox bought the film rights in March 1958 following the success of the film of Old Yeller, also based on a Gipson novel. The project was assigned to prolific producer Jerry Wald who hired director Don Siegel. Siegel had been working on a film about the Boxer Rebellion for Wald but the script from writer Barre Lyndon was not ready so Wald put him on Hound Dog Man.

Siegel later wrote in his memoirs, "I had never done a picture in this genre. It was a welcome change of pace to directed a film that children could go see. I wish I could do more. My reputation may be as a director of violence.... but that doesn't mean I can't, or don't want to do comedy, or love stories. My favourite picture is Brief Encounter."

Gipson was signed to write the script. According to the author's biographer, "changes in the story of Blackie Scanlon incite Gipson to uncontrollable rages and Tommie Gipson [his wife] arbitrates all further revisions." (The author would later be given shock treatment for depression and imprisoned for assault.)

=== Casting ===
Ricky Nelson, Lyndsay Crosby, and David Ladd were mentioned early on as possible stars, along with Stuart Whitman, who did wind up playing the title role. Tuesday Weld was at one stage mentioned as a possible female lead. Whitman was cast in March 1959.

The movie eventually became a starring vehicle for Fabian, who had released a series of hit singles. 20th Century Fox had enjoyed success launching pop stars Elvis Presley and Pat Boone into film careers and thought they could do the same with Fabian. He was paid $35,000 for ten weeks work.

Siegel recalled, "They thought they had a gold mine in Fabian and they wanted it to be a Fabian vehicle — that’s where we were poles apart, much as I like Fabian."

Curtis Harrington, who worked for Wald, was assigned to the film as associate picture. He wrote in his memoirs that he and Siegel went to see Fabian in concert at the Palladium in Hollywood:

Every move that Fabian made was greeted by screams and squeals of delight from his predominately young female audience. Don turned to me and said, “We really don’t need to do anything, do we? Just put him up on the screen and forget the rest.” But we didn’t forget the rest, and we cobbled together a reasonably good screenplay with a reasonably good cast to surround Fabian.

Despite Fabian's top billing, the main role was the character of Blackie, played by 20th Century Fox contract actor Stuart Whitman. Siegel said Wald wanted Fabian to "sing at least twelve songs in the picture. Fabian, though one of the nicest kids I ever mat, couldn't sing and knew it... I wanted to make Fred Gipson's excellent novel into a film which didn't feature any songs. Wald turned me down flat."

Wald tried to get Jayne Mansfield to play the part of a blousy barmaid but was unsuccessful. Dodie Stevens was cast because Wald's teenage sons liked her song "Pink Shoe Laces".

Curtis Harrington wrote that he was excited to be working on the film with Betty Field, an actress he had long admired, but when he saw her at the costume fitting he "sensed that the fire in her had died out" and later "knew that my first impression had been correct. She was a fine actress but the magic that had so thrilled me had gone."

=== Shooting ===
Filming started July 27, 1959 and took place through August and September.

Siegel said he "decided to have as much fun with the picture as possible. All but one of Fabian's songs were interrupted abruptly." This happens four times in the movie.

LQ Jones later recalled that Fabian "was not that talented as an actor, but he worked hard and was just a nice person." Siegel wrote that "Wald seemed puzzled at how easily the picture went together."

== Songs ==
"Hound Dog Man"

Single by Fabian Forte
- Released: 16 November 1959
- Recorded: 1959
- Genre: Rock and roll
- Length: 2:10
- Label: Chancellor Records
- Songwriters: Doc Pomus; Mort Shuman
- Producer: Peter De Angelis

Fabian Forte singles chronology
"Got the Feeling" (1959)	"Hound Dog Man" (1959)	"This Friendly World" (1959)

"This Friendly World"

Single by Fabian Forte
- Released: 23 November 1959
- Recorded: 1959
- Genre: Rock and roll
- Length: 2:00
- Label: Chancellor Records
- Songwriter: Ken Darby
- Producer: Peter De Angelis

Fabian Forte singles chronology
"Hound Dog Man" (1959)	"This Friendly World" (1959)	"String Along" (1959)

The movie featured the following songs:

- "Hound Dog Man" (by Doc Pomus and Mort Shuman) performed by Fabian
- "I'm Growin' Up" (by Robert P. Marcucci and Peter De Angelis) performed by Fabian and Dennis Holmes, while Stuart Whitman whistles
- "Single" (by Robert P. Marcucci and Peter De Angelis) performed by Fabian, Whitman and Dennis Holmes
- "This Friendly World" (by Robert P. Marcucci and Peter De Angelis) performed by Fabian
- "Pretty Little Girl" (by Robert P. Marcucci and Peter De Angelis) performed by Fabian and men's chorus at the barn dance
- "What Big Boy" (by Sol Ponti and Frankie Avalon) performed by Dodie Stevens
- "Hay Foot, Straw-Foot" (by Richard M. Sherman and Robert B. Sherman) performed by square dance caller Fenton Jones

Another song was cut from the film - "Got the Feeling" (by Richard M. Sherman and Robert B. Sherman) sung by Fabian.

"Hound Dog Man" was a hit single, reaching number 9 on the US charts. "This Friendly World" reached number 12.

== Reception ==
The film had its world premiere in Monroe, Louisiana, on 27 October 1959. Fabian made personal appearances to promote the film, where he was mobbed.

=== Box office ===
The film was not a commercial success, failing to make the Variety list of films that earned $1 million or more in rentals for 1959. In December 1959 Variety called its box office performance "a disappointment."

Fox executives in Variety argued the film "banked too heavily on a rock-and-roller at a time when r&r is on its way out; Fabian is really a favorite of the very young kids and not of the ticket-buying teenagers." One Fox executive put down the box office performance of the film as representing a “tremendous public rejection" of Fabian, while another at the same studio denied this and argued that the movie "although a slow starter, will end up in the black."

=== Critical ===
According to one review it was a "slice-of-life, coming-of-age piece – a little hunting, some singing, Claude Akins pops around periodically to snarl at Whitman, Lynley pants over Whitman as does Akins’ wife. There's a comic doctor, a dog, a barn dance. It's actually a sweet film – well made, with great production values, and a very strong cast."

Siegel said "it's difficult to get over in a precis the fun, the beauty, the splendid acting, the wondrous feeling of robust freedom in Hound Dog Man" calling Whitman "a brilliant actor." However he also added "Sam Peckinpah wanted to do a picture based strictly on the book. I'm sorry he didn't do it. He would have done it the way it should have been made - small."

However, Fox later found Fabian could be effective in supporting roles of major stars for the studios, such as John Wayne in North to Alaska and Bing Crosby in High Time.

Fabian later reflected in 1971 that he thought the title was to blame for the film's poor box office reception. "It was a good story with a great cast... but "Hound Dog Man"?"

== Sources ==
- Lich, Glen E. (1990). Fred Gipson at work. Texas A & M University Press. ISBN 978-0-89096-424-8.
- Siegel, Don (1993). A Siegel Film: An Autobiography. Faber and Faber.
