= Escándalo =

Escándalo may refer to:

== Film and TV ==
- El Escándalo, The Scandal (1934 film), Mexican film
- El Escándalo, The Scandal (1943 film), Spanish film
- Escándalo (telenovela), a 1997 TV series in Peru
- Escándalo TV, a daily live Spanish-language talk show about celebrity news and gossip of interest to a Latino audience, shown on TeleFutura (now known as UniMás).
- Escándalos, Spanish TV series
- Escándalo de estrellas, a 1944 Mexican musical comedy film directed by Ismael Rodríguez. It stars Pedro Infante, Blanquita Amaro, and Florencio Castelló.
- Escándalo de medianoche, a 1923 Argentine black and white silent film.

== Music ==
- Escândalo, Portuguese language album by Angela Ro Ro 2009
- "Escándalo", Spanish song from 1994 album by Vikki Carr Recuerdo a Javier Solís
- "Escándalo", Rubén Amado Anclado En Mi Corazón
- "Escándalo", song by Marco Antonio Muñiz List of number-one hits of 1961
- "Escándalo", song by Raphael 1991

== Other ==
- Escândalo do Mensalão
- Verano de Escándalo, a major annual professional wrestling event in Mexico promoted by the Lucha Libre AAA World Wide (AAA) promotion.
