= Bachelor Flat =

1962 film by Frank Tashlin

- Theatrical release poster
- Directed by: Frank Tashlin
- Screenplay by: Frank Tashlin; Budd Grossman
- Based on: Libby by Budd Grossman
- Produced by: Jack Cummings
- Starring: Tuesday Weld; Richard Beymer; Terry-Thomas; Celeste Holm
- Cinematography: Daniel L. Fapp
- Edited by: Hugh S. Fowler
- Music by: John Williams
- Distributed by: Twentieth Century-Fox
- Release date: January 12, 1962 (United States)
- Running time: 91 minutes
- Country: United States
- Language: English
- Budget: $1.5 million
- Box office: $1.4 million (US/Canada rentals)

Bachelor Flat is a 1962 American DeLuxe Color comedy film directed by Frank Tashlin and starring Tuesday Weld, Richard Beymer, Terry-Thomas, and Celeste Holm. Filmed in CinemaScope in Malibu, California, the film is a revised version of Tashlin's own Susan Slept Here (1954).

== Plot ==
A charming British anthropology Professor Bruce Patterson has to live with Helen Bushmill, his fiancée. Helen is away traveling, and has failed to tell him that she has a 17-year-old daughter Libby, who shows up at her mother's home unaware that Helen is engaged. Meanwhile, he has to resist the advances of the neighborhood ladies who barge in unexpectedly.

At the same time, Patterson must deal with the continual invasions of Mike, his cynical neighbor and law student, who soon develops a crush on Libby. Intertwined in the story is Mike's persistent dachshund, determined to bury the professor's prize possession of a rare dinosaur bone.

== Cast ==
- Tuesday Weld as Libby Bushmill
- Richard Beymer as Mike Polaski
- Terry-Thomas as Bruce Patterson
- Celeste Holm as Helen Bushmill
- Francesca Bellini as Gladys
- Howard McNear as Dr. Bowman
- Ann Del Guercio as Liz
- Roxanne Arlen as Mrs. Roberts
- Alice Reinheart as Mrs. Bowman
- Stephen Bekassy as Paul
- Margo Moore as Moll

== Production ==
In October 1960, 20th Century Fox's Robert Goldstein announced he had bought the screen rights to a British stage comedy, Libby by Budd Grossman. The play had been staged in London the previous year. Grossman would write the script, Jack Cummings would produce, and Frank Tashlin would direct. The plot was about an English professor at Hunter College who got involved with a group of 17 year olds on the loose from boarding school. It was to take place in Greenwich Village and was to be shot on location in New York in 1961.

Eventually the action was relocated to Malibu, where the film was shot starting April 1961. Lead roles were given to Fox contract stars Richard Beymer and Tuesday Weld, who had just supported another older star, Bing Crosby, in High Time. Gene Tierney was announced for the part of Weld's mother but Celeste Holm ended up playing it. After Ian Carmichael turned the film down Terry-Thomas was cast in the lead role; his first lead in an American film.

In an interview with Peter Bogdanovich, Tashlin said he included the dachshund as a satire on CinemaScope due to the dog's shape.

== Critical reviews ==
Variety called it a "frivolous, farcical concoction" and credits much of the great comedy to the supporting cast. They praise Terry-Thomas's "comic intuition and creativity" saying it is also "responsible for most of the merriment". However, they say "neither Weld nor Beymer seems comfortably at home in farce, and the strain often shows through", and that Celeste Holm is "stuck regrettably in a rather bland role". The critic adds: "The dachshund, incidentally, is an accomplished low comedienne."

Eugene Archer in the New York Times did not favor the film, stating that Terry-Thomas "is at the mercy of the writer-director who usually turns out Jerry Lewis' broadest japes", referencing director Tashlin as the "responsible party", He also calls the plot "flimsy" and that Terry-Thomas "seems perplexed" in his performance. He concludes that "viewers with a tolerance for brash vulgarity and a fitful pace" will most likely show "astonishment, resignation, and, eventually, mild amusement."

Blunders in the film:

The Age Gap: The professor states that his dinosaur bone is 57 million years old—millions of years after the dinosaurs completely died out.

The Profession Mix-Up: The script uses "archeologist," "anthropologist" and "paleontologist" interchangeably, when only paleontologists study dinosaur bones.

== See also ==
- List of American films of 1962
