= Margo Moore =

American actress and fashion model (1931–2000)

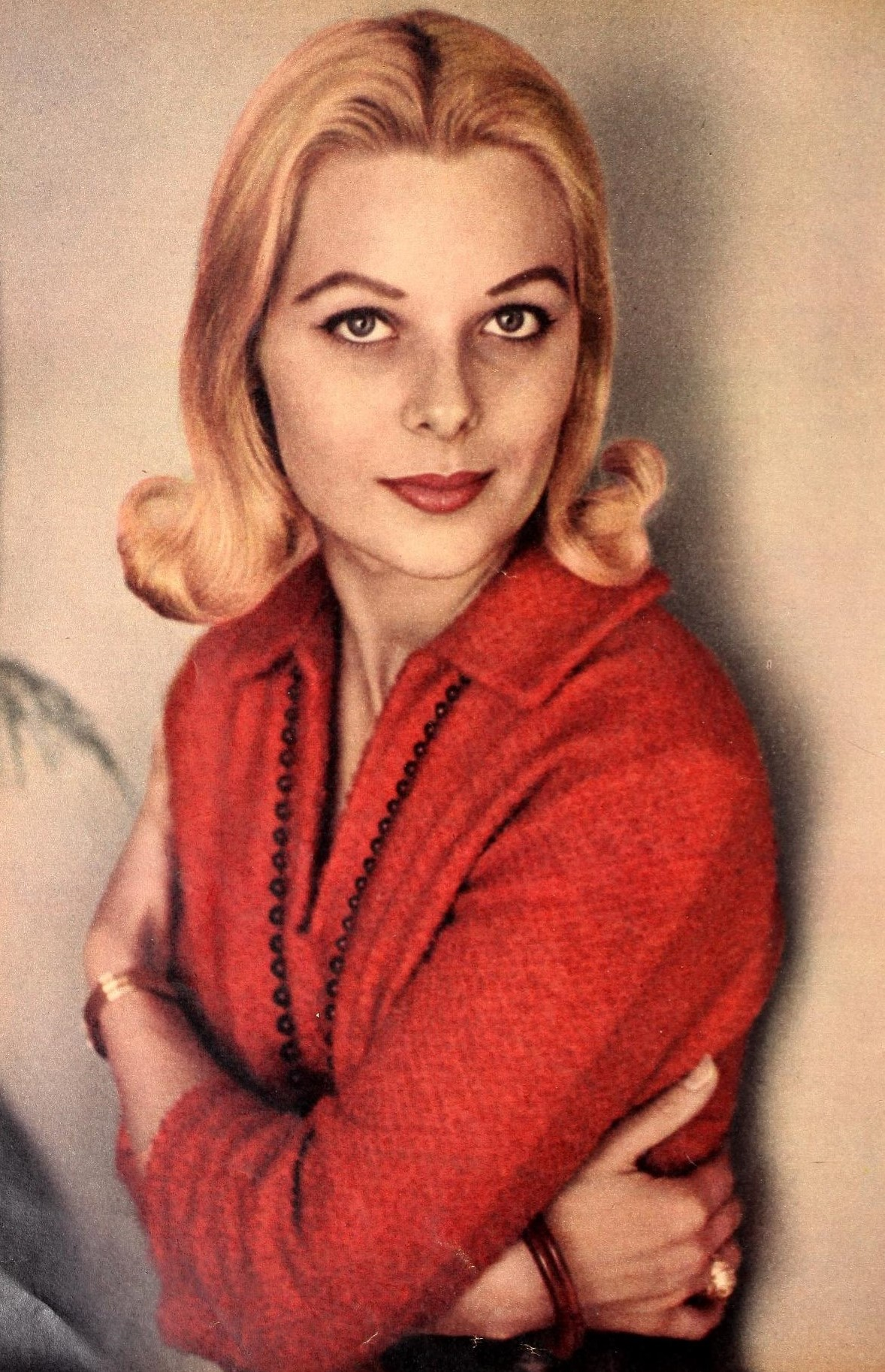
- Margo Moore, 1960
- Born: Marguerite Guarnerius; April 29, 1931; Chicago, Illinois, U.S.
- Died: December 16, 2000 (aged 69); Greenville, South Carolina, U.S.
- Other name: Marguerite Guarnery
- Education: Indiana University Bloomington
- Years active: 1959–1968
- Spouse(s): Joseph Warner (divorced); Joseph Knedlhans (1982–2000) (her death)
- Children: 1

Margo Moore (April 29, 1931 – December 16, 2000) was an American actress and fashion model.

== Life ==
Born Marguerite Guarnerius (also reported as Guarnery) in Chicago to a violin-making family, she grew up in Indianapolis. At the age of 13, she was afflicted with polio and spent two years in a hip-to-shoulder cast. She attended Indiana University in Bloomington. In the mid-1950s, she married Joseph Warner; a son resulted from the marriage, which ended after only a few years. In 1982, she married NYPD officer Joseph "Joe" Arthur Knedlhans, which lasted until her death from breast cancer.

== Career ==
She began her career as a model with the Ford Modeling Agency (now known as Ford Models) and appeared on the covers of Vogue and Mademoiselle. She also appeared in a number of television commercials and was a 'Toni Girl' on Arthur Godfrey's Talent Scouts. Signed to 20th Century Fox, her film debut was Hound-Dog Man, released in 1959 starring Fabian, Stuart Whitman, Carol Lynley, and Dodie Stevens. Other film appearances included Wake Me When It's Over in 1960 with Ernie Kovacs, Dick Shawn, Jack Warden, and Don Knotts, and the 1961 fictionalized biography The George Raft Story starring Ray Danton, Jayne Mansfield, Julie London, and Frank Gorshin. Moore also guest-starred on the American television dramas Perry Mason in "The Case of the Capering Camera" in 1964 and Run for Your Life episode "The Rape of Lucrece" starring Ben Gazzara in 1968. She was a lifetime member of both the Screen Actors Guild and American Federation of Television and Radio Artists.

After her film career ended, Moore turned to business pursuits. She owned a San Francisco portrait photography studio in the 1970s and in the mid-1980s she returned to New York City to run The Chocolate Garden, a candy shop at 79th Street and Third Avenue. While in New York, she was also corporate events manager for Working Women magazine. In 2000, just months before she died, Moore and her husband moved to rural Pennsylvania and opened The Toy Robot and Pig Museum in Stoudtburg Village, Lancaster County.
