= Swingers (1996 film) =

- Theatrical release poster
- Directed by: Doug Liman
- Written by: Jon Favreau
- Produced by: Victor Simpkins
- Starring: Jon Favreau; Vince Vaughn; Ron Livingston; Patrick Van Horn; Alex Désert; Heather Graham
- Cinematography: Doug Liman
- Edited by: Stephen Mirrione
- Music by: Justin Reinhardt
- Production companies: Independent Pictures; Alfred Shay Productions
- Distributed by: Miramax Films
- Release date: October 18, 1996
- Running time: 96 minutes
- Country: United States
- Language: English
- Budget: $250,000
- Box office: $4.6 million

Swingers is a 1996 American buddy comedy film directed by Doug Liman and written by Jon Favreau. The film follows the lives of single, unemployed actors living in Los Angeles during the 1990s swing revival. It stars Favreau, Vince Vaughn, Ron Livingston, Patrick Van Horn, Alex Désert, and Heather Graham.

A critical and commercial hit, the film helped propel Favreau, Vaughn, Graham, and Livingston to stardom, while also launching Liman's directing career as he won the award for Best New Filmmaker at the 1997 MTV Movie Awards.

This film was rated #58 on Bravo's "100 Funniest Movies". The film was honored on the 2007 Spike TV Guys' Choice Awards. In 2011, Empire magazine listed the film as #49 on its "50 Greatest American Independent Films" list.

== Plot ==
Mike Peters is a struggling comedian who left New York to find success in Los Angeles and is still upset over the break-up with his girlfriend of six years, Michelle, six months prior. To help Mike with his depression, his womanizing friend Trent and some other aspiring actor friends try to get him back into the social scene.

The movie opens with Mike telling his friend Rob about how desperately he misses Michelle and that she has not called him. Rob explains that "somehow" women "know" not to call their ex-boyfriends until they have completely moved on from them.

To help Mike recover, Trent coaxes him into an impromptu trip to Las Vegas. Trent succeeds in picking up two waitresses, but Mike's obsession with Michelle ruins Trent's plans. The women seem interested, but Mike spoils the mood, telling his date about her.

Back in Los Angeles, Mike, Rob and other friends golf, play video games, and go out. They are all trying to make it in the entertainment industry. Then they go bar hopping, stopping at a party, and later an after-hours spot, where Trent demonstrates his prowess in handling the opposite sex. Inspired by this, Mike meets a woman named Nikki and gets her phone number. His friends insist he wait two days minimum before calling. In the parking lot, some thugs accost Sue who retaliates by drawing a gun, scaring the thugs and his friends. Sue upsets Mike, ridiculing his unhealthy obsession with his ex prompting Mike to reconsider his behaviour and try to move on.

Back at his apartment, however, he leaves a series of increasingly desperate messages on Nikki's answering machine in the middle of the night, before she answers telling him to never call her again. Missing Michelle more than ever, he contemplates moving back to New York until Rob comes over and consoles him.

Out again for swing night at The Derby, Mike spots a woman named Lorraine. He summons all his courage to approach and connect with her. She has also recently come out of a relationship and moved to LA, and they dance swing together.

The following morning, Mike receives a call from Michelle, and finds that he no longer misses her. When Lorraine calls him, Mike cuts off his call with Michelle mid-sentence while she is about to say she loves him, to further things with Lorraine. Like him, Lorraine had disregarded friends' advice to wait days before calling.

The next day, the buddies meet at a coffee shop. Trent makes a fool of himself over a pretty redhead in a case of mistaken identity. Mike smirks, knowing that his life is moving forward while Trent is stuck in the past.

== Cast ==
- Jon Favreau as Mike Peters, a struggling comedian from New York City, recently broken up from his longtime girlfriend. New to Los Angeles.
- Vince Vaughn as Trent Walker, an aspiring actor, Mike's closest friend, and a confident swinger.
- Ron Livingston as Rob, Mike's friend from New York, a struggling actor and a recent arrival to Los Angeles.
- Patrick Van Horn as Sue, an irritable swinger who is named after the Johnny Cash song "A Boy Named Sue". Trent's roommate.
- Alex Désert as Charles, an acquaintance of the group and another struggling actor.
- Heather Graham as Lorraine, a woman Mike meets at a bar
- Brooke Langton as Nikki, another woman Mike meets at another bar
- Big Bad Voodoo Daddy as Derby Band
- Ahmed Ahmed as Party Mystery Guy
- Stephen Gaghan as Onlooker at Model Party Entrance (uncredited)
- Roger Kumble as Partygoer (uncredited)
- Mike White as Partygoer (uncredited)

== Production ==
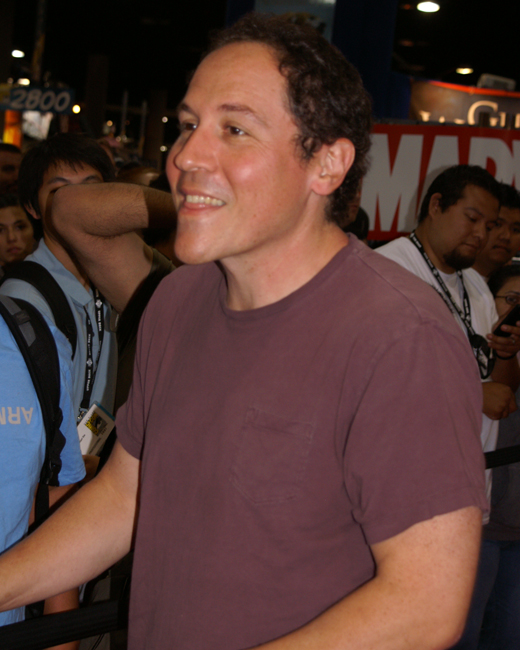
Favreau wrote and starred in Swingers.

=== Development ===
Favreau wrote the screenplay for Swingers in about two weeks. His father had given him a screenwriting program on a computer and he wanted to see if he could make a screenplay "just as an exercise". He had moved from Chicago and had also broken up with his girlfriend there, but the stories and events he wrote in were fictional. He had characters that he loosely based on friends, and used fellow actors for the key parts. He had become friends with Vaughn from the 1993 film Rudy, a movie they had acted in together. He had known Livingston from Chicago and their work at ImprovOlympic, and that they moved to Los Angeles around the same time.

During the time Favreau was trying to raise production money, some of the producers wanted to change the character of Trent to a woman, to not go to Vegas, and to make it darker and more violent. Others wanted to cast more notable actors like Johnny Depp or Chris O'Donnell, but Favreau declined those ideas. Favreau and his friends gave reader's theater performances of the script to drum up interest in and capital for the movie. Nicole LaLoggia, who knew of Favreau when the latter read for the film Getting In, agreed to work on the film. Her roommate, Doug Liman, secured production money from his father's business associate on the condition that Liman direct the film.

The title of the film was partly inspired by the Swingers Diner on Beverly Boulevard, a coffee shop that Liman and Favreau frequented. The "you're so money" catchphrase that the film popularized originated from a television commercial with Spike Lee and Michael Jordan in which Lee called Jordan "money". The phone call answering machine scene originated from a comedy bit by Jeff Garlin.

=== Filming ===
With the small budget, Favreau agreed to cast himself in the movie. Liman planned to shoot about 18 days with about 12 pages per day. They auditioned and cast Vaughn after considering some other bigger names. Many of the supporting and minor roles were filled from casual auditions and from cast and crew acquaintances. More money was spent on music licensing than for the film itself. Much of the film was shot using short ends, which meant many of the scenes could be filmed for about 60 seconds.

Mikey's apartment is located in the Franklin Village area of Los Angeles, a few miles from the Dresden Room. It was Favreau's real-life apartment at the time. Favreau also used his 1964 Mercury Comet Caliente convertible, which he had bought after his previous car had been stolen and stripped.

Swingers was filmed on location at several Los Angeles nightclubs, particularly in the hip Los Feliz neighborhood, including the Dresden Lounge and the Derby. Some of the shots were filmed documentary style with actual bar patrons as the crew could not afford to rent the places outright or hire a number of extras. The additional lighting was kept to a minimum as whenever the lights were brightened, the guests would scatter. The house party scene was filmed at the producers' friends' residences under the guise of a real house party.

The Las Vegas scenes were filmed primarily in two locations, with the exterior casino shots taking place at the Stardust Resort & Casino and all the subsequent interior shots being filmed at the Fremont Hotel and Casino, farther north in downtown Las Vegas.

=== Notable locations ===
The Dresden Room is a popular classic bar and club in the Los Feliz neighborhood, located at 1760 N. Vermont Ave. The music duo Marty and Elayne have been performing at the Dresden in real life several nights a week for over 35 years. Vaughn was a frequent visitor.

The cafe where various factions of the crew meet and eat was the Hollywood Hills Coffee Shop (now the 101 Coffee Shop) a few blocks from the Franklin Village apartments. According to Liman, the shop let the cast and crew film for only one night while under renovation. The scene involving peekaboo with the baby originated from Vaughn's experience with a similar person at an airport. It was added as an epilogue scene for the film, which would have ended with Favreau's character finishing the phone calls with the two women. The 101 Coffee Shop ultimately closed its doors for good in January 2021 due to the COVID-19 pandemic.

The bar where the characters dance is The Derby in Los Feliz, on the corner of Hillhurst and Los Feliz Boulevard, a club inspired by the original 1920s' Brown Derby Club on the same spot. Favreau had frequented there while he was raising money for the film, and even took swing dancing lessons. Big Bad Voodoo Daddy was a regular act there, so Favreau became friends with the band. The filming took place during one of their regular performances along with the swing dancers. In January 2009, the nightclub closed permanently. The property was bought and occupied by a bank.

=== Cameos ===
In addition to casting their friends in key roles, Favreau and Vaughn gave cameo roles to their family members. Vaughn's father, Vernon Vaughn, plays the lucky gambler at the $100-minimum blackjack table, while Favreau's grandmother, Joan Favreau, is the lucky gambler at the $5-minimum blackjack table. Actor Adam Scott, who had lived in the downstairs apartment from Favreau, appeared in the house party scene. Nicole LaLoggia, who was the line producer for the film, cameoed as the voice of Michelle towards the end of the film.

== Release and box office ==
Originally, the producers thought about entering Swingers into the film festival circuit, but it was not thought serious enough to be considered for Sundance. They then opted to release it commercially, with a preliminary screening at a Fairfax Cinema filled with the cast and crew's friends and some prospective buyers. After some negotiations, they sold the film to Miramax for $5 million (Liman recalls it was $5.5 million). It premiered at the Vista Theatre. Swingers had a domestic theatrical gross of $4,555,020.

Swingers would later get a distribution by Buena Vista Home Video.

== Reception ==
On review website Rotten Tomatoes, the film has an approval rating of 88% based on 56 reviews, with an average rating of 7.7/10. The site's critical consensus reads: "Funny, heartfelt, and effortlessly cool, Swingers made stars out of Vince Vaughn and Jon Favreau, and established Doug Liman as a director to watch." On Metacritic, the film has a weighted average score of 71 out of 100, based on 25 critics, indicating "generally favorable reviews".

Roger Ebert of the Chicago Sun-Times gave Swingers three out of a possible four stars, writing: "It's not a terribly original idea, [yet] the movie is sweet, funny [and] observant." On At the Movies, Gene Siskel said some of the film's early dialogue sounded forced, but it became a "smarter, more confident film" as the relationships develop. He admired the film's authenticity and gave it a "marginal thumbs up." Ebert agreed with Siskel's moderate endorsement but quipped he "wouldn't walk more than three-and-a-half blocks to see it," to the amusement of Siskel.

Owen Gleiberman of Entertainment Weekly gave the film an “A”, especially praising Favreau for his "exuberantly witty script". Kenneth Turan of Los Angeles Times wrote that the film “knows how to breathe life into its people, and hooking audiences is its reward.” Todd McCarthy of Variety praised the film's engaging tone, writing that it's “refreshingly human in its humor.”

== Legacy ==
It served as a breakthrough for Vaughn, who gained public exposure and critical acclaim for his performance. In particular, he caught the eye of Steven Spielberg when a copy of the film was sent to the director so they could clear the rights for the Jaws music. Spielberg then cast Vaughn in The Lost World: Jurassic Park. Director Liman also used the film to help launch a successful career in Hollywood (he would later be known for The Bourne Identity), and it was the first major film for Livingston.

The release of the film coincided with the swing revival of the 1990s. It increased interest in 1940s culture, Hollywood nightlife, and swing music. Some of the slang used in the film became popular in the years following its release, especially the use of the word "money" as a catch-all term of approval or quality. The exclamation "Vegas, baby!" also became a common quote when referencing the city. Big Bad Voodoo Daddy credits much of their later music success to their appearance in the film.

In 2008, the film was voted as the fourteenth best film set in Los Angeles in the previous 25 years by a group of Los Angeles Times writers and editors with two criteria: "The movie had to communicate some inherent truth about the L.A. experience, and only one film per director was allowed on the list".

== Soundtrack ==
Swingers Original Soundtrack

Soundtrack album by Various Artists
- Released: October 15, 1996
- Genre: Soundtrack
- Length: 41:21
- Label: Hollywood Records

There are two collections from the film; the first soundtrack, Swingers: Music From The Miramax Motion Picture, was released in 1996 and contained original music by composer Justin Reinhardt under the name "The Jazz Jury" as well as music by various artists included in the film. The soundtrack was certified gold by the RIAA on September 10, 2019. The second, Swingers Too!: More Music From... "Swingers", was released in 1999.

1. "You're Nobody till Somebody Loves You" - Dean Martin (1964)
2. "Paid For Loving" - Love Jones (1993)
3. "With Plenty of Money and You" - Count Basie/Tony Bennett (1959)
4. "You & Me & The Bottle Makes 3 Tonight (Baby)" - Big Bad Voodoo Daddy (1996)
5. "Knock Me a Kiss" - Louis Jordan (1941)
6. "Wake Up" - The Jazz Jury (1996)
7. "Groove Me" - King Floyd (1970)
8. "I Wan'na Be Like You" - Big Bad Voodoo Daddy (1996)
9. "Mucci's Jag M.K. II" - Joey Altruda (1996)
10. "King of the Road" - Roger Miller (1964)
11. "Pictures" - The Jazz Jury (1996)
12. "She Thinks I Still Care" - George Jones (1962)
13. "Car Train" - The Jazz Jury (1996)
14. "Pick Up the Pieces" - Average White Band (1974)
15. "Go Daddy-O" - Big Bad Voodoo Daddy (1996)
16. "I'm Beginning to See the Light" - Bobby Darin (1962)

Swingers Too! - More Music From... "Swingers"

1. "Ain't That a Kick in the Head?" - Dean Martin (1960)
2. "Adam and Eve" - Paul Anka
3. "Magic Man" {Single Edit} - Heart (1976)
4. "She's a Woman (W-O-M-A-N)" - Sammy Davis Jr. with Count Basie
5. "Baby (You've Got What It Takes)" - Dinah Washington/Brook Benton (1960)
6. "Down for Double" - Mel Tormé
7. "Staying Alive" {Studio Version} - Marty & Elayne
8. "There'll Be Some Changes Made" - Ann-Margret
9. "One Mint Julep" - Xavier Cugat (1964)
10. "Gimme That Wine" - Lambert, Hendricks & Ross (1960)
11. "Datin' with No Dough" - Royal Crown Revue
12. "Bring Me Sunshine" - Willie Nelson (1968)

=== Certifications ===
Region	Certification	Certified units/sales
United States (RIAA)	Gold	500,000^{‡}
^{‡} Sales+streaming figures based on certification alone.

== See also ==
- List of films set in Las Vegas
