= Equal Justice (TV series) =

- Created by: Thomas Carter; Christopher Knopf; David A. Simons
- Starring: George DiCenzo; Cotter Smith; Kathleen Lloyd; Jane Kaczmarek; Joe Morton; Sarah Jessica Parker
- Opening theme: "We Can Make It Over" performed by Carmen Carter and Carl Anderson
- Composer: Joseph Vitarelli
- Country of origin: United States
- Original language: English
- No. of seasons: 2
- No. of episodes: 27

Production
- Running time: 42 minutes
- Production companies: The Thomas Carter Company; ABC Productions (season 2); Orion Television Entertainment

Original release
- Network: ABC
- Release: March 27, 1990 – July 3, 1991

Equal Justice is an American legal drama television series that aired on ABC from March 27, 1990, to July 3, 1991.

This series details on the lives of the district attorney's office in Pittsburgh, Pennsylvania. The series stars George DiCenzo, Cotter Smith, Kathleen Lloyd, Jane Kaczmarek, Sarah Jessica Parker, Barry Miller, Joe Morton, James Wilder, Jon Tenney, and Debrah Farentino. Despite earning critical acclaim, the show received low ratings throughout its run and was cancelled after only two seasons.

== Awards and nominations ==
In 1990, the episode "Promises to Keep" won the Emmy Award for Outstanding Directing in a Drama Series.

In 1991, the episode "In Confidence" won the Emmy Award for Outstanding Directing in a Drama Series.

== Cast ==
- George DiCenzo as D.A Arnold Bach
- Cotter Smith as Deputy D.A Eugene Rogan
- Kathleen Lloyd as Jesse Rogan
- Jane Kaczmarek as Linda Bauer
- Joe Morton as Michael James
- Sarah Jessica Parker as Jo Ann Harris
- Barry Miller as Pete Brigman
- Debrah Farentino as Julie Janovich
- James Wilder as Christopher Searls
- Jon Tenney as Peter Bauer

== Episodes ==
=== Season 1 (1990) ===
No. overall	No. in season	Title	Original release date
1 2	1 2	"Pilot"	March 27, 1990
3	3	"Balancing Act"	March 28, 1990
4	4	"A Sucker's Bet"	April 4, 1990
5	5	"The Art of the Possible"	April 11, 1990
6	6	"Start of the Fire"	April 18, 1990
7	7	"Promises to Keep"	April 25, 1990
8	8	"The Price of Justice"	May 2, 1990
9	9	"Goodbye, Judge Green"	May 9, 1990
10	10	"False Images"	May 16, 1990
11	11	"Sugar Blues"	May 30, 1990
12	12	"Curses"	June 13, 1990
13	13	"Cop's Story"	June 20, 1990
14	14	"Separate Lives"	June 27, 1990

=== Season 2 (1991) ===
No. overall	No. in season	Title	Original release date
15	1	"Sleeping with the Enemy"	January 9, 1991
16	2	"End Game"	January 23, 1991
17	3	"Courting Disaster"	January 30, 1991
18	4	"In Confidence"	February 13, 1991
19	5	"Do No Harm"	February 27, 1991
20	6	"The Big Game and Other Crimes"	March 6, 1991
21	7	"Part of the Plan"	March 13, 1991
22	8	"Who Speaks for the Children"	March 20, 1991
23	9	"Do the Wrong Thing"	March 27, 1991
24	10	"Without Prejudice"	April 10, 1991
25	11	"Opening Farewell"	June 19, 1991
26	12	"What Color Are My Eyes?"	June 26, 1991
27	13	"The Devil His Due"	July 3, 1991
