= Wake Me When It's Over (film) =

1960 film by Mervyn LeRoy

- Directed by: Mervyn LeRoy
- Written by: Richard L. Breen
- Screenplay by: Richard L. Breen
- Based on: Wake Me When It's Over; 1959 novel by Howard Singer
- Produced by: Mervyn LeRoy
- Starring: Ernie Kovacs; Dick Shawn; Margo Moore; Jack Warden
- Cinematography: Leon Shamroy
- Edited by: Aaron Stell
- Music by: Cyril J. Mockridge
- Production company: Mervyn LeRoy Productions Inc.
- Distributed by: Twentieth Century-Fox
- Release date: April 8, 1960
- Running time: 126 minutes
- Country: United States
- Language: English
- Box office: $2,000,000 (US/ Canada)

Wake Me When It's Over is a 1960 American DeLuxe Color comedy film directed by Mervyn LeRoy and starring Ernie Kovacs and Dick Shawn in CinemaScope. The screenplay concerns a World War II veteran who gets called back into service by mistake and is sent to a dreary Pacific island. The film is based on the novel of the same name by Howard Singer. The title song was written by Sammy Cahn (words) and James Van Heusen (music) and sung by Andy Williams.

== Plot ==
Gus Brubaker is a self-described schnook. Soon after the end of the Korean War, his wife talks him into applying for G.I. insurance for which he is eligible from his World War II service with the Air Force. Gus is reluctant because he was shot down and became a prisoner of war, but the military listed him as killed. A red-tape foulup results in Gus being back in uniform, assigned to a ramshackle radar station on a backwater island near Shima, Japan. Boredom has made the airmen assigned there apathetic, slovenly, and unmotivated. Its equipment and supplies are a collection of junk, abandoned or surplus.

Capt. Charlie Stark, a free-wheeling nonconformist Air Force pilot, is in charge. His superiors have all but forgotten the base is still on the island. Gus gets to know Ume Tanaka, daughter of the village's unfriendly mayor, who shows him a pool of natural hot springs. Gus and Charlie conspire to open a resort hotel, using the men as labor and the broken-down equipment as materials, with Doc Farringtom scamming journalist Joab Martinson about the water's "healing powers" to gain free publicity.

Doc summons no-nonsense Lt. Nora McKay to lend a woman's touch to the project, and Charlie develops a romantic interest in her. The airmen, including Charlie, are motivated by the project and their pretty young lieutenant, become a military outfit again, and construct a first-class facility, the Hotel Shima. Nora staffs the hotel with 40 young women from the village, and following local custom, the girls are "sold" for two years to Gus as their "papa-san" at the insistence of their fathers. Nora and Charlie fall in love, but when he asks her to marry him, she is doubtful that he is marriage material.

When Martinson gets drunk and embarrasses himself in front of all the guests, he vindictively writes a story painting the hotel as a den of sin. Gus is court-martialed as a scapegoat despite the fact that 100 airmen are its owners. When Charlie becomes outraged and demands to testify, he is transferred by his reputation-conscious commander to prevent it. A congressional panel from Washington, DC also launches an investigation, Charlie ends up buzzing the trial in a jet as Doc Farrington blackmails Colonel Hollingsworth with the knowledge that he received Hotel Shima-supplied luxury goods. Stark ends up testifying on Gus's behalf, while all sorts of crazy antics occur during the trial.

Ultimately, Brubaker is found not guilty on one count, but guilty of taking government property. During sentencing, the court discovers it has tried the wrong man due to the earlier government error. Stymied, the panel finally decides to find Gus not guilty and leave the hotel to the people of the island. Charlie and Nora reconcile from an earlier disagreement over the trial and decide to marry. As Gus says goodbye to Ume and sets off to leave, he sees that Colonel Hollingsworth (now demoted to sergeant) has been assigned to the base in his place. Ume waves goodbye as Gus starts for home.

== Cast ==
- Ernie Kovacs as Captain Charlie Stark
- Dick Shawn as Gus Brubaker
- Margo Moore as First Lieutenant Nora McKay
- Jack Warden as Captain Dave "Doc" Farrington
- Nobu McCarthy as Ume Tanaka (as Nobu Atsumi McCarthy)
- Don Knotts as Staff Sergeant Percy Warren
- Robert Strauss as Technical Sergeant Sam Weiscoff
- Noreen Nash as Marge Brubaker
- Parley Baer as Colonel Archie Hollingsworth
- Robert Emhardt as Joab Martinson
- Marvin Kaplan as Hap Cosgrove
- Tommy Nishimura as Private Jim Harigawa
- Raymond Bailey as General Weigang
- Vin Scully as a CBS reporter
- Judy Dan as Geisha Girl (uncredited)

== See also ==
- List of American films of 1960
