= Eleven Blue Men =

1953 book by Berton Roueché

Eleven Blue Men, and Other Narratives of Medical Detection
- First edition
- Author: Berton Roueché
- Language: English
- Publisher: Boston : Little, Brown
- Publication date: 1953
- Pages: 215
- OCLC: 2008402

Eleven Blue Men, and Other Narratives of Medical Detection is a collection of twelve true short stories written by Berton Roueché and published in 1953. Each story, including the titular story Eleven Blue Men, was originally published in the "Annals of Medicine" section of The New Yorker between 1947 and 1953.

== Eleven Blue Men ==
The short story which gives its name to the title of the collection, Eleven Blue Men, was Berton Roueché's first medical story and it is arguably his most famous. It was originally published in The New Yorker in 1947 and was also included in Roueché's later collection of short stories The Medical Detectives. Eleven Blue Men formed the basis of the pilot of the television program Medical Investigation.

=== Plot summary ===
A man collapses in a Manhattan street and is taken to a doctor; he has abdominal cramping, retching, confusion and an alarming bluish hue to the skin. The doctor is understandably confused, and at first diagnoses carbon monoxide poisoning, which is known to cause cyanosis (a blue colour to the extremities due to oxygen deprivation). The hospital prepares for a mass poisoning due to a gas leak or other possible cause. They are right to do so, as another ten men turn up at the hospital with the same symptoms — thus the eponymous eleven blue men.

At this point, it becomes an epidemic, and the Department of Health is called in to investigate. The two investigators recognise the case as being similar to an extremely rare poisoning. Only ten recorded outbreaks have happened, and up until then the largest number of people affected in each one was four. This had, thus, become the worst such incident in history.

By the time they reach the hospital, one man has already died. The others have begun to recover, but the Department of Health is determined to find the underlying cause. They quickly rule out gas poisoning — one of the main symptoms is lacking, and it had taken too long to present. Instead, after questioning the men, they discover that the men all had become sick soon after eating the same food in the same place: oatmeal in a cafeteria.

This suggests food poisoning, but of an incredibly rare type that the doctors have never seen before. The men do not have the main symptoms of food poisoning: diarrhoea and vomiting. Also, the incubation period is too short for the most common bacterial poisonings. They also suspect recreational drugs, but the men deny this, saying that they drink quite heavily but nothing else. This brings them back to the oatmeal. Did it have something in it that could cause this reaction?

The other possibilities are a chemical contaminant. The men are given a blood test and the doctors also visit the cafeteria where they had eaten shortly before becoming ill. They meet someone from the Bureau of Food and Drugs, who finds multiple violations of the health code in the cafeteria — it is infested with vermin and has open sewage lines, amongst other things.

They ask the cook how he made the oatmeal that morning and he explains how he uses dry cereal, water and a handful of salt. The cereal is a generic brand and the water is municipal; these are ruled out as sources of the poison, as more people would be sick if this were the case. That leaves the salt.

On the same shelf as the can of salt is another can full of white grains. The doctors ask the chef what this is; he responds that this is saltpetre, used to preserve meats. Its main component is sodium nitrate. The chef also mentions that once, he accidentally refilled the salt can with saltpetre, before realising his mistake and replacing the saltpetre with the real salt.

After testing the saltpetre, they find that instead of sodium nitrate, the can contains sodium nitrite. This minor difference is almost unnoticeable, as they both look and taste just like table salt. Both are used to preserve meat, but the levels present in food are closely monitored. However, sodium nitrite is extremely toxic.

The can of salt in the kitchen still contained some grains of the sodium nitrite when the chef refilled it with salt. This in itself was not enough to poison the men; otherwise many other men would have gotten sick that day. The men must have received a second dose from somewhere. The doctors realise that some people like to put salt on their oatmeal. The extra sodium nitrite in the salt in a table saltcellar could provide this. They test the saltcellars and find one that contains sodium nitrite. If all the men had used this saltcellar, this could be the cause of their poisoning. Even so, they would have to have consumed a full spoon full of salt, more than any person usually would.

Unfortunately, the men have all left the hospital by the time the doctors get back to confirm their hypothesis, and it is left uncertain how they got poisoned. However, the doctors hypothesize that since the men were all heavy drinkers and heavy drinkers often have low levels of salt in their blood, these men may have developed a strong craving for salt, leading them to consume enough from the nitrite-filled shaker to make a fatal dose.

== Other Narratives of Medical Detection ==
The remaining eleven stories include:

- "The Fog", an account of the 1948 Donora smog, which (together with "A Pig From New Jersey") won Roueché the 1950 Albert Lasker Medical Journalism Award.
- "A Man from Mexico", an account of the 1947 New York City smallpox outbreak.
- "The Alerting of Mr. Pomerantz" details the discovery of the disease rickettsialpox.
- "A Lonely Road" recounts the tale of a leper from Harlem.
- "Something Extraordinary" discusses antibiotic research.
- "A Perverse, Ungrateful, Maleficent Malady", an examination of gout.

In addition there are stories of tetanus, psittacosis, typhoid fever, trichinosis and food poisoning.

== Reception ==
The book was widely praised by critics for being accessible to general public without compromising on the integrity of the medical work presented. A review in the journal the Archives of Ophthalmology described the book as "fascinating" and "superbly written". The Mystery Writers of America gave Eleven Blue Men, and Other Narratives of Medical Detection a Raven Award as best book in a mystery field outside the regular categories of crime novels and crime reporting. Eleven Blue Men, and Other Narratives of Medical Detection is one of the top ten favourite books of author Kaye Gibbons.

== Legacy ==
Eleven Blue Men was required reading for many years for those training at the Centers for Disease Control and Prevention's Epidemic Intelligence Service.
