= James Wilder (actor) =

American actor

James Wilder is an American film and television actor.

== Early life ==
Wilder was born in Cleveland, Ohio, and raised in Sausalito, California. The son of a French mother and an Italian father, Wilder performed as a fire eating street performer before he became an actor.

== Career ==
During his career, Wilder portrayed Adam Louder on the Fox soap opera Models Inc., Christopher Searls on the ABC TV drama Equal Justice and Nick Lewis on the 1993 remake of Route 66 on NBC.

== Personal life ==
In 1997, Wilder dated actress Kirstie Alley. The two met on the set of Nevada and soon were engaged, but "ended their four-year relationship."

== Filmography ==
=== Film ===
Year	Title	Role	Notes
1980	Can't Stop the Music	Auditioning Sword Juggler	Uncredited
1984	Delta Pi	Shawn	
1987	Nightforce	Mack	
1987	Zombie High	Barry	
1988	Murder One	Carl Isaacs	
1988	State Park	Truckie	
1991	Scorchers	Dolan	
1994	Tollbooth	Vic	
1997	Nevada	Rip	
1997	Allie & Me	Rodney Alexander	
1998	Ivory Tower	Jarvis Cone	
1998	Charades	Quinn	
1999	Flypaper	Jerry	
2000	Closing the Deal	Will Williams	
2001	Perfume	Billy	
2001	Burning Down the House	Arnie Green	
2001	Knight Club	J. B. Aaron	
2001	Touched by a Killer	Taylor Nash	
2001	Heart of Stone	Steve Sterns	
2002	Man of the Year	Vaughn	
2003	Mind Games	Brian Reeves	
2009	The Funk Parlor	John Funk	
2014	3 Holes and a Smoking Gun	Bobby Blue Day	

=== Television ===
Year	Title	Role	Notes
1985	CBS Schoolbreak Special	Justin	Episode: "The War Between the Classes"
1987	The Bronx Zoo	Eddie Matousek	Episode: "Changes"
1987	Cracked Up	John Owens	Television film
1988	Shades of Love: Midnight Magic	Anthony Palmer	Television film
1990–1991	Equal Justice	Christopher Searls	26 episodes
1992	Prey of the Chameleon	J.D.	Television film
1992	Grass Roots	Jerry Lomax	Television film
1993	Route 66	Nick Lewis	4 episodes
1993	Night Owl	Harry	Television film
1994	Confessions: Two Faces of Evil	Robert Berndt	Television film
1994	Melrose Place	Reed Carter	7 episodes
1994	Tonya & Nancy: The Inside Story	Jeff Gillooly	Television film
1995	Models Inc.	Adam Louder	20 episodes
1996	A Face to Die For	Alec Dalton	Television film
1996	The Outer Limits	Raymond Dalton	Episode: "The Refuge"
1996	To Love, Honor and Deceive	Det. Jim Sanders	Television film
1997	Daughters	Scott Douglas	Television film
1998	The Last Don II	Billy D'Angelo	2 episodes
1998	Veronica's Closet	Hunter	4 episodes
2001	Face Value	Tim Gates	Television film
2006	The Perfect Marriage	Brent Richter	Television film
2007	McBride: Dogged	Michael Whyte	Television film
TBA	In the Blink of an Eye	Sam	Television film
