= Berton Roueché =

American journalist

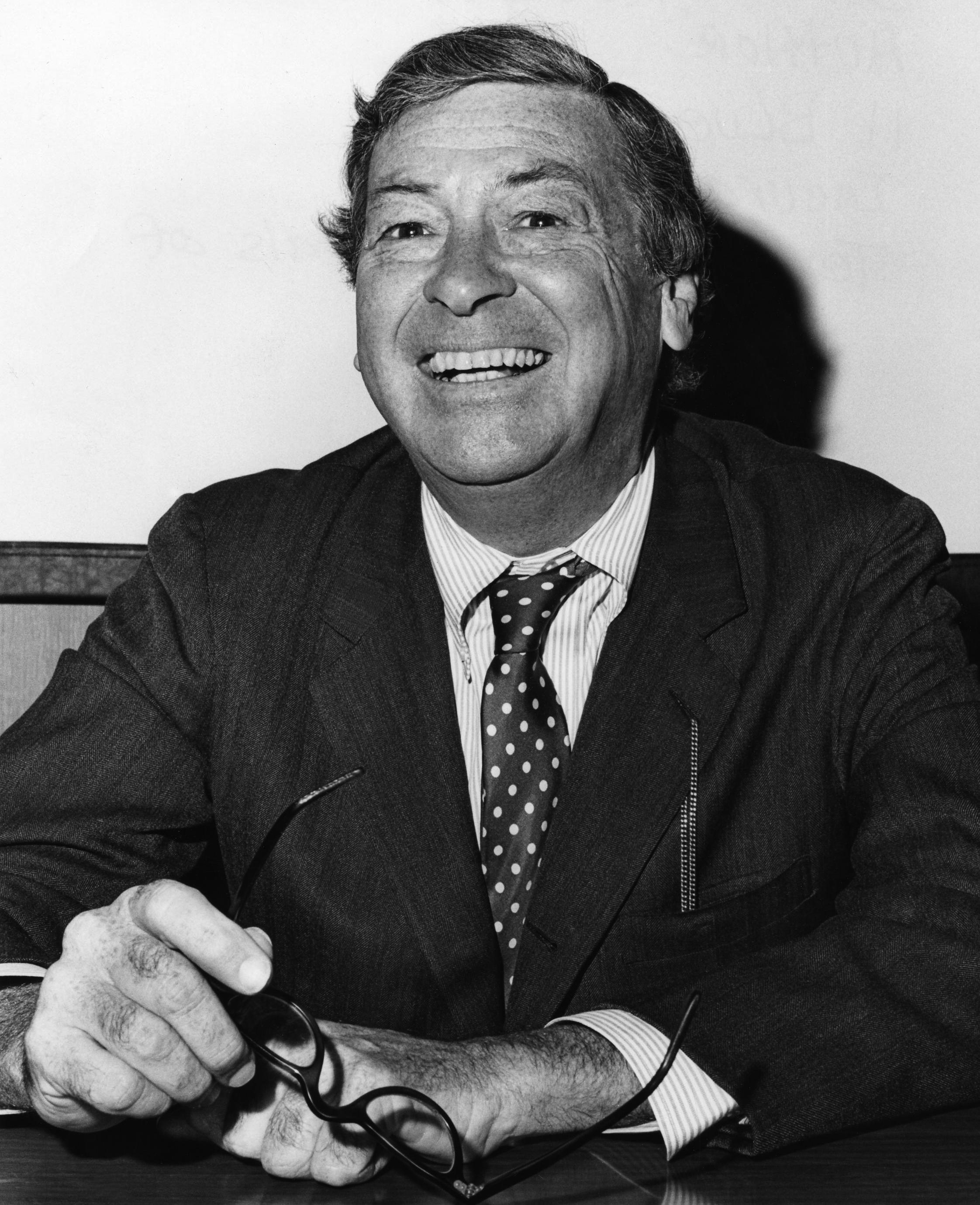
- CDC portrait of Berton Roueché
- Born: Clarence Berton Roueché; April 16, 1910; Chicago, Illinois, United States
- Died: April 28, 1994 (aged 84); Amagansett, New York, United States
- Citizenship: United States
- Education: Bachelor of Journalism degree from the Missouri School of Journalism
- Alma mater: University of Missouri
- Occupations: Journalist; novelist; writer
- Writing career
- Period: 1944–1991
- Genres: non-fiction, detective, mystery, suspense
- Subjects: Medical writing, epidemiology, public health, infectious diseases
- Notable works: Eleven Blue Men (1954); The Incurable Wound (1958); Feral (1974); The Medical Detectives (1980)
- Notable awards: Raven Award – Best Book in a Mystery Field – Mystery Writers of America; 1954 Eleven Blue Men; Academy Award – Literature – The American Academy of Arts and Letters; 1982

Clarence Berton Roueché Jr. (/ruːˈʃeɪ/ roo-SHAY; April 16, 1910 – April 28, 1994) was an American medical writer who wrote for The New Yorker magazine for almost fifty years. He wrote twenty books, including Eleven Blue Men (1954), The Incurable Wound (1958), Feral (1974), and The Medical Detectives (1980). An article he wrote for The New Yorker was made into the 1956 film Bigger Than Life, and many of the medical mysteries on the television show House were inspired by Roueché's writings.

== Early life and education ==
Berton Roueché was born in Chicago on April 16, 1910, to Clarence Berton Roueché Sr., a tailor, and Nana Maria Mossman. His paternal great-grandparents emigrated from France. He graduated from Southwest High School in Kansas City in 1928 and is a member of the Southwest High School Hall of Fame. He received an undergraduate journalism degree at the University of Missouri in 1933.

== Career ==
He was a reporter for The Kansas City Star, the St. Louis Post-Dispatch, and the St. Louis Globe-Democrat.

In 1944, he was hired as a staff writer for The New Yorker magazine. In 1946, "The Annals of Medicine" department of the magazine was created for him. "The Annals of Medicine" is a series about medical detection and the fight against different diseases. An article he wrote for The New Yorker, entitled "Ten Feet Tall", was made into a 1956 film called Bigger Than Life, which stars James Mason. The article and film are about the negative side effects of the drug cortisone. Roueché remained a staff writer for The New Yorker until his death, a span of about fifty years.

In addition to writing for The New Yorker, he wrote twenty books, mostly pieces of medical writing focused on epidemiology, with elements of mystery and detective work. He wrote several suspense novels, including Black Weather (1945), The Last Enemy (1956), Feral (1974), and Fago (1977). Roueché's writings, especially his book The Medical Detectives (1980), inspired in part the television show House, which premiered in 2004 on the Fox network. Many of the medical cases in the show are directly inspired by real-life cases in The Medical Detectives. His 1954 book Eleven Blue Men, which was a collection of pieces he had written for The New Yorker, was awarded a Raven by the Mystery Writers of America. In 1982, he received an Academy Award of The American Academy of Arts and Letters for literature. He received awards from the American Medical Association, the New England Journal of Medicine, the Kansas City Academy of Medicine, the American Medical Writers Association, and the Lasker Foundation.

== Personal life ==
On October 28, 1936, he married Katherine Eisenhower, the niece of future U.S. President General Dwight D. Eisenhower. She remained his wife until his death in 1994. They had one child, Arthur Bradford Roueché, who was born November 16, 1942.

Later in life, he developed emphysema (COPD).

On April 28, 1994, Roueché died at his home in Amagansett, Long Island. He was 84 years old. The cause of death was suicide.

== Bibliography ==
=== Books ===
==== Fiction ====
- Black Weather (1945) (also known as Rooming House)
- The Last Enemy (1956)
- Feral (1974) (also released as The Cats)
- Fago (1977)

==== Medical writing ====
- Eleven Blue Men, and Other Narratives of Medical Detection (1954) (alternative title: Annals of Medical Detection)
- The Incurable Wound and Further Narratives of Medical Detection (1958)
- Roueché, Berton, ed. (1963). Curiosities of Medicine: An Assembly of Medical Diversions, 1552–1962.
- A Man Named Hoffman and Other Narratives of Medical Detection (1966) (published in the UK as Dossier of Medical Detection)
- Roueché, Berton, ed. (1967). Handbook for World Travelers: Field Guide to Disease.
- Annals of Epidemiology (1967)
- The Orange Man and Other Narratives of Medical Detection (1971)
- The Medical Detectives (1980, reissued in 1991)
- The Medical Detectives II (1984)
- The Man Who Grew Two Breasts: And Other True Tales of Medical Detection (1996) (published posthumously; the book contains seven instalments that had not been in any books previously)

==== Travel writing ====
- Greener Grass (1948)
- The Delectable Mountains (1953)
- What's Left: Reports on a Diminishing America (1968)
- Desert and plain, the mountains and the river: A celebration of rural America by Berton Roueché and David Plowden (1975)
- The River World and Other Explorations (1978)
- Special Places: In Search of Small Town America (1982)
- Sea to Shining Sea: People, Travels, Places (1987)

==== Other nonfiction ====
- The Neutral Spirit: a Portrait of Alcohol (1960)

=== Essays and reporting ===
==== Annals of Medicine ====
Article	New Yorker publication	Book publication	Later collection
The Alerting of Mr. Pomerantz	August 23, 1947	Eleven Blue Men	The Medical Detectives II
A Perverse, Ungrateful, Maleficent Malady	March 6, 1948	Eleven Blue Men	
Eleven Blue Men	May 29, 1948	Eleven Blue Men	The Medical Detectives
A Man from Mexico	June 4, 1949	Eleven Blue Men	The Medical Detectives II
The Fog	September 23, 1950	Eleven Blue Men	The Medical Detectives II
A Pig from Jersey	November 11, 1950	Eleven Blue Men	The Medical Detectives
A Pinch of Dust	June 16, 1951	Eleven Blue Men	The Medical Detectives II
Something Extraordinary	July 21, 1951	Eleven Blue Men	
A Game of Wild Indians	March 29, 1952	Eleven Blue Men	The Medical Detectives
Family Reunion	December 27, 1952	Eleven Blue Men	
Birds of a Feather	April 11, 1953	Eleven Blue Men	The Medical Detectives II
A Lonely Road	October 10, 1953	Eleven Blue Men	The Medical Detectives II
Lost	June 12, 1954	The Incurable Wound	The Medical Detectives II
One of the Lucky Ones	February 19, 1955	The Incurable Wound	The Medical Detectives II
Ten Feet Tall	September 3, 1955	The Incurable Wound	
CH_{3}CO_{2}C_{6}H_{4}CO_{2}H	March 24, 1956	The Incurable Wound	The Medical Detectives
The Incurable Wound	March 30, 1957	The Incurable Wound	The Medical Detectives
The Most Delicate Thing in the World	April 27, 1957	The Incurable Wound	The Medical Detectives II
Impression: Essentially Normal	March 29, 1958	A Man Named Hoffman	The Medical Detectives
The Liberace Room	September 10, 1960	A Man Named Hoffman	The Medical Detectives
Placebo	October 8, 1960	A Man Named Hoffman	The Medical Detectives II
A Certain Contribution	January 14, 1961	A Man Named Hoffman	The Medical Detectives II
A Great Green Cloud	July 8, 1961	A Man Named Hoffman	
S. Miami	November 25, 1961	A Man Named Hoffman	The Medical Detectives II
An Emotion of Weirdness	August 10, 1963	A Man Named Hoffman	
Back to Venice	October 5, 1963	A Man Named Hoffman	
Leaves of Three	September 5, 1964	A Man Named Hoffman	The Medical Detectives II
A Swim in the Nile	October 31, 1964	A Man Named Hoffman	The Medical Detectives
A Man Named Hoffman	April 17, 1965	A Man Named Hoffman	The Medical Detectives
Something a Little Unusual	May 8, 1965	The Orange Man	The Medical Detectives
In the Bughouse	November 20, 1965	The Orange Man	The Medical Detectives II
Shiver and Burn	November 5, 1966	The Orange Man	The Medical Detectives II
The Orange Man	May 20, 1967	The Orange Man	The Medical Detectives
Three Sick Babies	September 28, 1968	The Orange Man	The Medical Detectives
The Case of Mrs. Carter	November 30, 1968	The Orange Man	The Medical Detectives II
The Hiccups	March 29, 1969	The Orange Man	The Medical Detectives II
The Dead Mosquitos	October 4, 1969	The Orange Man	The Medical Detectives
A Woman with a Headache	January 24, 1970	The Orange Man	The Medical Detectives II
The Huckleby Hogs [Insufficient Evidence]	August 15, 1970	The Orange Man	The Medical Detectives
A Small, Apprehensive Child	April 3, 1971	The Orange Man	The Medical Detectives II
The West Branch Study [The Simpsons and the Hepatitides]	August 14, 1971	The Orange Man	The Medical Detectives
The Santa Clause Specimen	August 28, 1971	The Orange Man	The Medical Detectives II
As Empty as Eve	September 2, 1974	The Medical Detectives	
Two Blue Hands	December 15, 1975	The Medical Detectives	
All I Could Do Was Stand in the Woods	September 5, 1977	The Medical Detectives	
Antipathies	March 6, 1978	The Medical Detectives	
Sandy	August 14, 1978	The Medical Detectives	
Live and Let Live	July 9, 1979	The Medical Detectives	
A Rainy Day on the Vineyard	July 28, 1980	The Medical Detectives	
The Prognosis for This Patient is Horrible	January 18, 1982	The Medical Detectives; Volume II	
The Hoofbeats of a Zebra	May 28, 1984	The Medical Detectives; Volume II	
A Contemporary Touch	August 6, 1984	The Medical Detectives; Volume II	
The Dinosaur Collection	May 5, 1986	The Man Who Grew; Two Breasts	
Cinnabar	December 1, 1986	The Man Who Grew; Two Breasts	
The Fumigation Chamber	December 28, 1987	The Medical Detectives (1991 reissue)	
A Lean Cuisine	June 20, 1988	The Medical Detectives (1991 reissue)	
The Foulest and Nastiest Creatures That Be	September 5, 1988	The Medical Detectives (1991 reissue)	
The Poker Room	August 28, 1989	The Man Who Grew; Two Breasts	
A Good Safe Tan	March 4, 1991	The Man Who Grew; Two Breasts	
The Man Who Grew Two Breasts	—	The Man Who Grew; Two Breasts	
Overdoing It	—	The Man Who Grew; Two Breasts	
Hoping	—	The Man Who Grew; Two Breasts	

==== Other ====
- Roueché, Berton & A. Sadler (February 4, 1950). "Novice". The Talk of the Town. The New Yorker. 25 (50): 23.
