= Ivory Tower (1998 film) =

1998 film

- VHS cover
- Directed by: Darin Ferriola
- Written by: Darin Ferriola
- Produced by: Darin Ferriola; Jeff Ritchie
- Starring: Michael Ironside; Patrick Van Horn; Kari Wührer; James Wilder
- Cinematography: Maida Sussman
- Edited by: Rick Fields
- Music by: Kevin Saunders Hayes
- Distributed by: Santelmo Entertainment
- Release date: 1998
- Running time: 96 minutes
- Country: United States
- Language: English

Ivory Tower is a 1998 American drama film about young people trying to enter the computer industry in Silicon Valley. The film was directed by Darin Ferriola, and stars Michael Ironside, Patrick Van Horn, Kari Wührer, and James Wilder.

== Synopsis ==
Anthony is in charge of launching a new product, however his views on life and work are challenged by a new boss willing to do whatever it takes to succeed.

== Cast ==
- Jack Janda as Ahmad
- Patrick Van Horn as Anthony Daytona
- James Wilder as Jarvis Cone
- Michael Greene as Walter Felice
- Brian Reddy as Bob Martell
- Kari Wuhrer as Karen Clay
- Ian Buchanan as Andy Pallack
- Keith Coogan as Russ Dyerson
- Michael Ironside as Marshall Wallace
- Richard Cody as Stephen
- Garrett Wang as Mark
- Gina Mari as Tammy
- Lisa Stahl as Carol
- Roger Clinton as Tim Cartridge

== Production ==
Ferriola wrote the script with the film's investors in mind, after researching the likes and dislikes of potential funders. He received a budget of $700,000 with which to create the movie, which he also produced and directed. This marked Ferriola's directorial debut and the first film released through his production company One-Tu-Three Prods. Pic.
