= Angela Ro Ro (album) =

Studio album by Angela Ro Ro
- Released: 1979
- Recorded: 1979
- Genre: MPB, Blues rock
- Length: 36:06
- Label: PolyGram
- Producer: Ricardo Cantaluppi; Paulo Lima

Angela Ro Ro chronology
Angela Ro Ro (1979)	Só Nos Resta Viver (1980)

Angela Ro Ro is the debut album by Brazilian singer and songwriter Angela Ro Ro, released in 1979 by PolyGram under the Polydor Records label.

== Background ==
At the age of 30, Brazilian singer Angela Ro Ro released her debut album. After living in Europe, playing in London pubs, and working with Caetano Veloso on the album Transa, she returned to Brazil to release her first album, in a studio located in the city of Rio de Janeiro.

Angela composed all the songs on the album. She collaborated with Ana Terra on the song "Amor, Meu Grande Amor" and with Sérgio Bandeyra on "A Mim e a Mais Ninguém".

In a 2021 interview with journalist Lucas Borges Teixeira, from the MonkeyBuzz portal, Angela stated that her influence was not Janis Joplin, but rather Rhythm and Blues and boogies, citing artists such as Muddy Waters, Howlin' Wolf, Fats Domino, Odetta, and Big Mama Thornton, thus demonstrating the blues rock influence on the album.

== Track listing ==
All tracks are written by Angela Ro Ro, except where noted.

No.	Title	Writer(s)	Length
1.	"Cheirando a Amor"		2:42
2.	"Gota de Sangue"		2:25
3.	"Tola Foi Você"		2:37
4.	"Não Há Cabeça"		3:50
5.	"Amor, Meu Grande Amor"	Angela Ro Ro, Ana Terra	3:16
6.	"Me Acalmo Danando"		3:15
7.	"Agito e Uso"		2:36
8.	"Mares da Espanha"		3:15
9.	"Minha Mãezinha"		2:26
10.	"Balada da Arrasada"		2:46
11.	"A Mim e a Mais Ninguém"	Angela Ro Ro, Sérgio Bandeyra	3:05
12.	"Abre o Coração"		3:53
Total length:			36:06

== Release ==
The album was released in 1979 on LP by PolyGram under the Polydor Records label. In 2002, the album was released on CD, produced by Marcelo Fróes and released by Polydor, where it underwent a remastering process at a studio in Barra da Tijuca, a neighborhood in Rio de Janeiro.

== Legacy ==
In 2007, the Brazilian edition of Rolling Stone magazine published a list of the 100 greatest Brazilian albums, in which this album ranked in seventy-third place, being the only album by Angela mentioned on the list.

Music journalist Mauro Ferreira praised the album on his blog on the G1 portal when it turned 40 in 2019, stating, "Ro Ro arrived burning brightly in the fire of passion, with the distinction of embracing homosexuality in the lyrics of songs such as Tola foi você (1979), one of the gems of this album recorded with Ro Ro's very personal touch on the piano." He added: "Steeped in occasional irreverence, the melancholy of the songs on Angela Ro Ro's debut album remains intoxicating 40 years after the release of this anthological record, which still smells of love and pain with the same freshness as in 1979."

In a poll of the 500 greatest Brazilian albums conducted by the Discoteca Básica podcast, which featured more than 160 music experts, the album was ranked in seventy-second place, also being the only album by Angela mentioned on the list.

In March 2024, music critic Bruno Ascari, owner of the YouTube channel Som de Peso, reviewed the album, where he rated the album as "flawless" and added, "the lyrics are wonderful, so beautiful, as you realize, all the intensity, all the dramatic charge, you feel everything the album represents."

== Personnel ==
The following musicians worked on the albums:

- Angela Ro Ro: vocals, piano;
- João Baptista: electric bass;
- Téo Lima: drums;
- Antonio Adolfo: piano;
- Rick Ferreira: guitar;
- Sônia Burnier: choir;
- Myriam Peracchi: choir;
- Claudio Cartier: choir;
- Robertinho Silva: drums;
- Jamil Joanes: electric bass;
- Nilton Rodrigues: trumpet;
- Zé Carlos Bigorna: saxophone;
- Netinho: saxophone;
- Luiz Bezerra: saxophone;
- Jorge Vianna: artwork;
- Marco Rodrigues: photographer;
- Ricardo Cantaluppi: producer;
- Paulinho Lima: producer.
