= A Face to Die For =

1996 television film directed by Jack Bender

- Genre: Drama
- Based on: The Face
- Written by: Marvin and Mark Werlin
- Screenplay by: Marvin and Mark Werlin, Duane Poole
- Directed by: Jack Bender
- Starring: Yasmine Bleeth; James Wilder; Robin Givens; Chandra West
- Music by: Christopher Franke
- Country of origin: United States
- Original language: English

Production
- Executive producers: Frank Konigsberg; Robert Levinson
- Producers: Jayne Bieber; Duane Poole; Mark Werlin; Marvin Werlin
- Production locations: 4th Street Viaduct, Los Angeles, California; Santa Fe Avenue, Downtown, Los Angeles
- Cinematography: Eagle Egilsson
- Editor: Mark Melnick
- Running time: 90 minutes
- Production company: Konigsberg Company

Original release
- Network: NBC
- Release: March 11, 1996

A Face to Die For (also known as The Face in the UK and Australia) is a 1996 television film, based on the book The Face by Marvin and Mark Werlin who also wrote the teleplay with Duane Poole. It is a romantic thriller that stars Yasmine Bleeth, James Wilder and Robin Givens.

== Plot ==
Due to a tragic childhood accident, Emily Gilmore (Bleeth) is left scarred both physically and mentally. The large scar on her face is a constant reminder to Emily that her career and love life are suffering. Lonely yet talented, she longs for a successful career and romance but is trapped by insecurity and fear.

The handsome Alec Dalton (Wilder) turns her life around and makes her feel truly happy and secure for the first time in her life. Unfortunately, he talks her into stealing money from her employer. But the old man that she works for comes in during the robbery and has a heart attack. She stays behind to help him while Alec runs off. He escapes with the money but she is sent to prison. She is so in love with Alec she does not say a word about his involvement.

While she is in prison, Emily learns that Alec has run away with her own sister, Sheila Gilmore (Chandra West). Devastated, Emily is in a fight with another inmate and because of the injuries she sustains she has to be seen by Dr. Matthew Sheridan (Richard Beymer). The doctor tells her that he can correct her scars for free with an experimental surgery. It is a great success and she is beautiful, almost unrecognizable. After the surgery, she begins a relationship with the surgeon, who showers her with gifts and love. She is released from prison and they become engaged, but she leaves him when she discovers that Matthew had reconstructed her face to be identical to his dead wife's.

Emily attempts to begin again, changing her name to Adrian Corday and starting her own business as a fashion designer with her friend from prison Claudia (Givens). She reconnects with a kind man from her past, Paul (Ricky Paull Goldin), and starts a relationship with him (though he does not know her true identity.) But when she runs into Alec and he does not recognize her, she decides to take her revenge.

During the climax of the film, Alec recognizes Adrian as Emily under the make up and plastic surgery because of the scar. Giving him the money, she tries to kill him. He is able to take the gun away, only to find out it is a fake, and tries to scar Emily again. However, Sheila appears and confronts him. She tells Alec that she knew he set Emily up because Claudia told her everything. During their struggle, she shoots him in the chest and he collapses to the ground dead. Taking Sheila to her room, they clean up the blood on their faces. She confessed she killed him after finding out how he set Emily up because he was infatuated with her. After their marriage, Alec was very abusive to Sheila, gave her a similar scar and it drove her to drink. Emily convinces her to go home and let her deal with this. If the police call and tell Sheila about Alec's death, she must act surprised and inconsolable. She asks Emily to forgive her for what happened. She assures Sheila she has and tells her to go home.

Changing her clothes and putting on make up, Emily goes downstairs and pretends to be shocked when she asks the concierge what happened. He informs her about a shooting and there was a woman with a scar who wanted to meet up with Alec, but then another woman showed up and shot him. Paul appears and apologizes to Emily. While escaping, she decides to confess to him about her past. Paul tells Emily that he already knew because Sheila and Claudia told him about it. He reassures her that her secret is safe with him.

== Cast ==
- Yasmine Bleeth as Emily Gilmore
  - Kashia Miller as Young Emily Gilmore
- James Wilder as Alec Dalton
- Richard Beymer as Dr. Matthew Sheridan
- Ricky Paull Goldin as Paul Mallory
- Robin Givens as Claudia
- Chandra West as Sheila Gilmore
- Mitch Ryan as Joe Thomas
- Rosalind Ayres as Mrs. Travers
- Bette Ford as Mrs. Berman
- Kelly Jo Minter as Rita
- Michael Clark as Michael
- Pat Musick as Mrs. Anderson
- Ian Abercrombie as Mr. Sturetsky
- Philip Simon as Hotel clerk
- Toni Sawyer as Woman at reception
- Scott McKinley as Anesthesiologist
- Elisabeth Ryall as Linda Blake
- Francesca Poston
- Mary Ellen Trainor as Mrs. Gilmore
- Jo De Winter as Bunny Thomas

== Production ==
Goldin was engaged to Bleeth, but the wedding was called off after the wedding invitations had already been printed.
