= State of Emergency (1994 film) =

- Genre: Drama; Thriller
- Written by: Susan Black; Lance Gentile
- Directed by: Lesli Linka Glatter
- Starring: Joe Mantegna; Lynn Whitfield; Melinda Dillon; Paul Dooley; Jay O. Sanders; Richard Beymer
- Music by: Robert Folk
- Country of origin: United States
- Original language: English

Production
- Executive producers: Colin Callender; Jeffrey Lurie
- Producers: John P. Marsh; Jay Roewe
- Production location: Los Angeles
- Cinematography: Frank Byers
- Editors: Hubert de La Bouillerie; Tracy Granger
- Running time: 90 minutes
- Production companies: HBO Showcase; Chestnut Hill Productions

Original release
- Network: HBO
- Release: February 12, 1994

State of Emergency is a 1994 American drama film directed by Lesli Linka Glatter and written by Susan Black and Lance Gentile. The film stars Joe Mantegna, Lynn Whitfield, Melinda Dillon, Paul Dooley, Jay O. Sanders and Richard Beymer. The film premiered on HBO on February 12, 1994.

== Cast ==
- Joe Mantegna as Dr. John Novelli
- Lynn Whitfield as Dehlia Johnson
- Melinda Dillon as Betty Anderson
- Paul Dooley as Jim Anderson
- Jay O. Sanders as Dr. Jeffrey Forrest
- Richard Beymer as Dr. Ronald Frames
- Robert Beltran as Raoul Hernandez
- Christopher Birt as Dr. Victor Davidson
- Dean Cameron as Roger
- Deborah Kara Unger as Sue Payton
- Paul Ben-Victor as Trevor Jacobs
- F. William Parker as Brent Avery
- Lucy Butler as Rebecca Farinzi
- Gerald Castillo as Ralph Ortiz
- John Considine as Malcolm Parker
- Irene Olga López as Maris Alvarez
- Lance Gentile as Dr. Wayne Garrick
- Quinn Harmon as Elaine Fitzgerald
- Josie Kim as Joan Brooks
- Vanessa Marquez as Violetta
- Gregory Sporleder as Larry
- Kate Williamson as Dr. Yvonne Chambers
- Blair Tefkin as M.I.C.N. Dispatcher
