= The Disappearance of Kevin Johnson =

1996 mockumentary

The Disappearance of Kevin Johnson is a 1996 American mockumentary Written and directed by Francis Megahy. It premiered in January 1996 at the Slamdance Film Festival in the United States and later was released on July 25, 1997 in the United Kingdom. This marked Dudley Moore's last live-action role before his death.

== Storyline ==
The Disappearance of Kevin Johnson is about the unexplained disappearance of a fictitious wealthy British film producer, Kevin Johnson, who is dealing in sex, lies and blackmail in Hollywood.

== Cast ==
- Pierce Brosnan as himself
- James Coburn as himself
- Dudley Moore as himself
- Alexander Folk as Police Detective
- Bridget Baiss as Gayle Hamilton
- Carl Sundstrom as Security Guard
- Michael Brandon as Jeff Littman
- Keely Sims as Leela Kerr
- Hector Elias as Ramon Garcia
- John Hillard as Ricky Ryan
- Heather Stephens as Rhonda
- Rick Peters as Willis Stevens
- Ian Ogilvy as Gary
- Michael Laskin as Bill Rackman
- Charlotte Brosnan as Amy
- Brett Baker as Grant
- Guy Siner as Fred Barratt
- Richard Neil as Larry Hillman
- Richard Beymer as Chad Leary
- Timothy Omundson as Nick Ferretti
- Michael Cooke as Judd Ramberg
- Rachael Harris as Il Fornaio Waitress
- Jayson Kalani as Le Petit Four Waiter
- Frederika Kesten as Fitness Trainer
- Eric Da Re as Apartment Manager
- Connie Blankenship as Lisa
- Katherine LaNasa as Cathy
- Stoney Jackson as Julian
- Madison Clarke
- Valarie Rae Miller as Rudi
- Scott Coffey as Video Engineer
- Kari Wuhrer as Kristi Wilson
- John Solari as Captain Hammond
