= Richard Beymer =

American actor (born 1938)

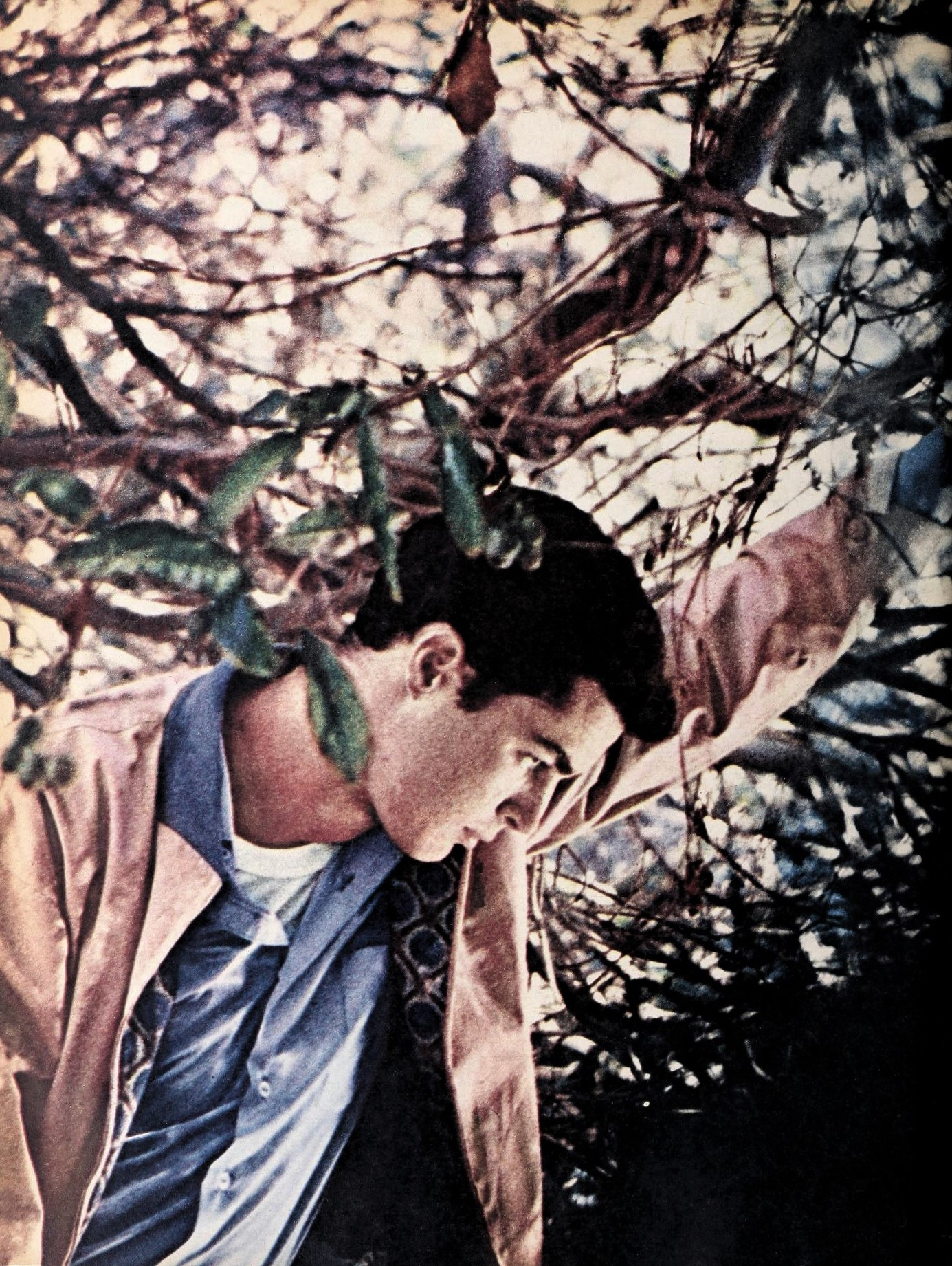
- Beymer in 1961
- Born: George Richard Beymer Jr. February 20, 1938 (age 88); Avoca, Iowa, U.S.
- Occupations: Actor; painter; sculptor; novelist
- Years active: 1949–present

George Richard Beymer Jr. (born February 20, 1938) is an American actor, filmmaker and visual artist. After making his feature acting debut in Vittorio De Sica's Stazione Termini (1953), he rose to promience for playing the roles of Peter van Daan in The Diary of Anne Frank (1959) and Tony in the 1961 film adaptation of West Side Story.

Through the early 60s, Beymer continued to portray lead roles in films such as Frank Tashlin's Bachelor Flat (1961), Martin Ritt's Hemingway's Adventures of a Young Man (1962), and Franklin J. Schaffner's The Stripper (1963). After shifting his focus towards filmmaking in the mid 60s, Beymer would continue to sporadically act, most notably as Ben Horne on the television series Twin Peaks (1990–1991, 2017).

As a filmmaker in the late 60s, he focused on documentaries focused on the civil rights movement, before working on the experimental narrative feature The Innerview throughout the 1970s. Later documentary works include features focused on subjects such as the funeral of Transcendental Meditation creator Maharishi Mahesh Yogi and Twin Peaks co-creator David Lynch's spiritual journey to India.

== Career ==
=== Child actor ===
Beymer acted on television in Los Angeles for three years in a show called Sandy Dreams, rehearsing after school during the week and recording it on Saturdays. The show ended when he was 13.

Beymer made his feature-film debut in Vittorio De Sica's Stazione Termini (1953). He was under contract to David O. Selznick for a year. The contract with Selznick lasted for one year. Beymer was in much demand on television: Cavalcade of America (1954) and Johnny Tremain (1957). He guest starred in 26 Men, Zane Grey Theatre, Make Room for Daddy, The Gray Ghost, Navy Log, Whirlybirds, Sky King, Jane Wyman Presents The Fireside Theatre, and Schlitz Playhouse.

=== 20th Century Fox ===
George Stevens cast Beymer in The Diary of Anne Frank (1959), playing Peter Van Daan.

Beymer was put under contract to 20th Century Fox and started to be regarded as an exciting future star. Producer William Perlberg later said "It's a thing that periodically happens out here. Somebody comes along and talk starts and agents and studios keep talking and talking. Like an avalanche, the talk gathers speed. Ultimately that 'somebody' turns out to be a big name in Hollywood only."

After appearing in Playhouse 90, he had a supporting role in High Time (1960), a comedy with Bing Crosby and Tuesday Weld at 20th Century Fox. Filmink said he was "actually quite funny" in the movie. "I wanted to be a very good actor," said Beymer later. "I wanted to work and let the work stand for something."

In June 1960, Beymer was cast in the lead role of Tony in West Side Story (1961), a huge hit. His singing was dubbed by Jimmy Bryant. He was nominated for the Golden Globe Award for New Star of the Year – Actor.

Beymer later said he "was miserable in West Side Story. I didn't know enough at the time because I lacked certain knowledge in acting...I came out ridiculous. I didn't stand up for what I should have and I didn't know enough. The blame should be on me."

Beymer was reunited with Weld in the Fox comedy Bachelor Flat (1961). At Columbia, he played the son of Rosalind Russell and Jack Hawkins in Five Finger Exercise (1962). Beymer later said he was "terrible" in it.

He was given the role of Nick Adams in Hemingway's Adventures of a Young Man (1962) for Fox, with an all-star supporting cast. Producer Jerry Wald says he and director Martin Ritt agreed that Beymer was "the young actor I think stands the best chance of being the next Gary Cooper." During filming, Beymer met Sharon Tate, and he encouraged her to get into acting. The film was a big flop and it has been argued it "killed Beymer as a movie star."

Beymer had a significant role in the film The Longest Day (1962), which was successful, but he was unhappy with his acting in the film. "They tried to make me the nice kid next door," he said. "That's just not me. They said just play you - but I am not the all-American boy."

Beymer started attending daily classes at the Actors Studio. "I just want to learn and be as professional as I can," he said.

Producer Wald and director Franklin Schaffner cast Beymer in The Stripper (1963) with Joanne Woodward, which was critically acclaimed but not a big hit. Beymer returned to New York. "I got sick of the whole thing and I left," he said.

=== Semi-retirement ===
In 1964, Beymer became involved in Freedom Summer in Mississippi. "You get tired of being a complainer, passive," he said.

He assisted Barney Frank in rescuing Freedom Democrat forms in a rental truck that had been confiscated from arrested Freedom volunteers in Canton, Mississippi on Freedom Day (July 16, 1964). During this time, he filmed the award-winning documentary A Regular Bouquet: Mississippi Summer (1964), portraying the efforts of volunteers registering African-Americans to vote.

In February 1964, he said all the films he had done except The Longest Day "should have been classroom work and never should have been shown publicly...I'm not a leading man. I'm a character actor. That is, I'm not a stereotyped leading man type. I'm kind of a schlepp at times...I don't care about billing and being a star. Being myself is the first thing."

Beymer guest-starred in episodes of Kraft Suspense Theatre, The Virginian, Bob Hope Presents the Chrysler Theatre, Dr. Kildare, The Man from U.N.C.L.E., and Death Valley Days. He acted in The Country Girl on stage.

=== Filmmaker ===
In the 1970s, Beymer turned to experimental filmmaking with The Innerview, which he wrote, produced, directed, and starred. It won the Josef von Sternberg Award at the Mannheim-Heidelberg International Filmfestival in 1974. "I never left the movies," Beymer said. "I just made different kinds of movies."

In the early 2000s, Beymer returned to making documentaries. One titled Whatever Happened to Richard Beymer?, which chronicled his obsession with photography throughout his life, was screened at the 2002 Twin Peaks Festival in Seattle. He continued to focus on directing documentaries: His 2010 film The Passing of a Saint chronicles the funeral rites of Maharishi Mahesh Yogi. In April 2014, It's a Beautiful World, his film of a trip to India with David Lynch, was released.. He also directed Richard Beymer's Before...the Big Bang (2016). I Had Bad Milk in Dehradun (2017), and Behind the Red Curtain (2017) both focus on the production of the 2017 revival of Twin Peaks.

He starred in, wrote and directed episodes of the television series Insight. He lived for two years in a commune and worked in Switzerland.

=== Continued acting ===
Beymer returned to Los Angeles in 1982 to restart his career.

He appeared in Cross Country (1983). He had roles in Paper Dolls (1984), playing the husband of Mimi Rogers, and Generation (1985). His television appearances at the time include Moonlighting, Dallas, The Bronx Zoo and Buck James, and co-starred in the film Silent Night, Deadly Night 3: Better Watch Out! (1989).

Beymer was widely seen in Twin Peaks (1990–1991) playing Ben Horne, reuniting him with his West Side Story co-star Russ Tamblyn who played Dr Lawrence Jacoby. He followed it in Blackbelt (1992) and The Presence (1993).

He made three appearances on Star Trek: Deep Space Nine as Li Nalas in the episodes "The Homecoming", "The Circle", and "The Siege".

Beymer was seen in Under Investigation (1993), My Girl 2 (1994), State of Emergency (1994), The Disappearance of Kevin Johnson (1996), several episodes of Murder, She Wrote, A Face to Die For (1996), The Little Death (1996), Foxfire (1996), Elvis Meets Nixon (1997) and Home: the Horror Story. He was in episodes of Flipper, The X-Files, Vengeance Unlimited, Profiler, and Family Law.

Beymer reprised his role as Ben Horne in the third season of Twin Peaks in 2017.

In 2019, Beymer visited the set of Steven Spielberg's remake of West Side Story. In December 2021, Rachel Zegler, the film's star, released two photos on her Instagram page: One of Beymer sitting next to Spielberg; another of Beymer hugging Zegler while screenwriter Tony Kushner looked on. According to Zegler, Beymer said "Te adoro María" to her "over and over again" as they embraced.

== Books ==
In 2007 Beymer completed Impostor: Or Whatever Happened to Richard Beymer?, his first book, a self-published novel and a semi-autobiographical account of a young actor's struggle to find himself.

== As visual artist ==
Beymer's photographs of Twin Peaks cast and crew were featured in the gallery of behind the scenes photos on the Definitive Gold Box Edition for Twin Peaks, released on October 30, 2007. He is also a painter and sculptor.

== Personal life ==
An active supporter of the Civil Rights Movement, Beymer participated in Freedom Summer in Valley View, Mississippi.

As of 2010, Beymer resided in Fairfield, Iowa, where he continued to make films and to write, sculpt, and paint. He practices Transcendental Meditation, to "cool out".

== Filmography ==
=== Film ===
Year	Title	Role	Notes
1951	Fourteen Hours		Uncredited
1953	Terminal Station	Paul Stevens	
1953	So Big	Roelf (Age 12–16)	
1957	Johnny Tremain	Rab Silsbee	
1959	The Diary of Anne Frank	Peter Van Daan	
1960	High Time	Bob Bannerman	
1961	West Side Story	Tony	Nominated —Golden Globe Award for Best Actor – Motion Picture Musical or Comedy; Nominated — Golden Globe Award for New Star of the Year – Actor
1961	Bachelor Flat	Mike Pulaski	
1962	Five Finger Exercise	Philip Harrington	
1962	Hemingway's Adventures of a Young Man	Nick Adams	
1962	The Longest Day	Pvt. Dutch Schultz	
1963	The Stripper	Kenny Baird	
1964	A Regular Bouquet: Mississippi Summer		Documentary short; director and writer
1969	Scream Free!	Dean	
1973	The Innerview	Actor	Also director, writer, producer, editor and cinematographer
1983	Cross Country	Evan Bley	
1989	Silent Night, Deadly Night 3: Better Watch Out!	Dr. Newbury	Direct-to-video
1992	Blackbelt	Eddie Deangelo	
1993	Under Investigation	Dr. Jerry Parsons	
1994	My Girl 2	Peter Webb	
1996	The Disappearance of Kevin Johnson	Chad Leary	
1996	Foxfire	Mr. Parks	
1998	Playing Patti		
2000	Home the Horror Story	Bob Parkinson	
2001	India - Shivaratri 2001		Documentary short; director, editor and cinematographer
2002	Whatever Happened to Richard Beymer?		Documentary; director, editor and cinematographer
2008	Sadie's Waltz	Garvus	Short film
2010	The Passing of a Saint		Documentary; director, editor and cinematographer
2014	It's a Beautiful World		Documentary; director, editor and cinematographer
2016	Richard Beymer's Before the Big Bang		Documentary; director, editor and cinematographer
2017	I Had Bad Milk in Dehradun		Documentary short; director, editor and cinematographer
2017	Behind the Red Curtain		Documentary short; director, editor and cinematographer

=== Television ===
Year	Title	Role	Notes
1954	Cavalcade of America		Episode: "Gentle Conqueror"
1956–1957	Make Room for Daddy	The Boyfriend / Freddie Baxter	2 episodes
1957	The Gray Ghost	Luke Burnette	Episode: "An Eye for an Eye"
1957	26 Men	Tod Devers	Episode: "Dead Man in Tucson"
1957	Zane Grey Theatre	Shep Jolland	Episode: "The Bitter Land"
1958	Navy Log	Ennis Thompson	Episode: "The Soapbox Kid"
1958	Whirlybirds	John Thompson	Episode: "The Brothers"
1958	Sky King	Joe Belden	Episode: "Man Hunt"
1958	Jane Wyman Presents The Fireside Theatre	Mark	Episode: "On the Brink"
1958, 1968	Death Valley Days	John Owens / Zeb Fallon	2 episodes
1959	Schlitz Playhouse		Episode: "On the Brink"
1959	Playhouse 90	LeRoy Cadman	Episode: "Dark December"
1965	Kraft Suspense Theatre	Werner Schiff	Episode: "The East Breach"
1965	The Virginian	Mark Shannon / Frank Colter	2 episodes
1966	Bob Hope Presents the Chrysler Theatre	Ralph Belmonte	Episode: "Guilty or Not Guilty"
1966	Dr. Kildare	Reverend Jack Elder	3 episodes
1967	The Man from U.N.C.L.E.	Harry Williams	Episode: "The Survival School Affair"
1975, 1978–1982	Insight	Train Conductor / Josh / God	3 episodes as actor; also cinematographer of 14 episodes and editor of 2 episodes
1979	Blessed Be		Television short; editor
1981	The Girl on the Edge of Town		Television film; cinematographer
1982	To Climb a Mountain		Television film; cinematographer
1982	The Juggler of Notre Dame		Television film; cinematographer
1982	Leadfoot		Television film; cinematographer
1983	Josie		Television film; cinematographer, editor, and composer
1984	Paper Dolls	David Fenton	13 episodes
1985	Safe Harbor		Television film; cinematographer
1985	Generation	Allan Breed	Television film
1986	Moonlighting	Ray Adamson	Episode: "All Creatures Great...and Not So Great"
1987, 1991, 1993, 1996	Murder, She Wrote	Various roles	6 episodes
1987–1988	Buck James	Max	2 episodes
1987	Dallas	Jeff Larkin	Episode: "Bedtime Stories"
1988	The Bronx Zoo	Mr. Locke	Episode: "The Gospel Truth"
1990–1991	Twin Peaks	Benjamin Horne	30 episodes
1992	Danger Island	Ben	Television film
1993	Star Trek: Deep Space Nine	Li Nalas	3 episodes
1994	State of Emergency	Dr. Ronald Frames	Television film
1996	A Face to Die For	Dr. Matthew Sheridan	Television film
1996	Flipper	Andrew Cantrell	Episode: "Sharks"
1996	The X-Files	Dr. Jack Franklin	Episode: "Sanguinarium"
1997	Elvis Meets Nixon	Bob Haldeman	Television film
1998	Vengeance Unlimited	Douglas Bradford	Episode: "Noir"
1999	Profiler	Martin Fizer	Episode: "Ceremony of Innocence"
2001	Family Law	Richard Collins	Episode: "Against All Odds"
2017	Twin Peaks	Benjamin Horne	6 episodes
