= Knight Club =

2001 film by Russell Gannon

- Directed by: Russell Gannon
- Written by: Jim Lofti; Russell Gannon
- Starring: Lou Diamond Phillips; Glenn Plummer; Ed Lauter; Lochlyn Munro
- Music by: Terry Plumeri
- Release date: 2001
- Running time: 90 minutes
- Country: United States
- Language: English

Knight Club is a 2001 American film starring Lou Diamond Phillips and directed by Russell Gannon.

== Plot ==
A failed actor is promoted to head bouncer at one of Los Angeles' hottest nightclubs where he struggles to remain loyal to legendary bouncer Dirk Gueron, the leader of the fearsome Knights. When a rival nightclub makes a tempting offer, the allure of success threatens to destroy everything he has worked for.

== Cast ==
- Lochlyn Munro as Gary Grieco
- Lou Diamond Phillips as Dirk Gueron
- Glenn Plummer as "T-Dog"
- Ed Lauter as Fire Marshall
- Demetrius Navarro as Jesse
- Taylor Stanley as Brittany
- Michael Trucco as Derek
- Andrew Divoff as Grigori Krukov
- Stephanie-Marie Baker as Paige
- Dawn McMillan as Diane
- Russell Gannon as Dimitri
- James Wilder as J.B. Aaron
