= Patrick Van Horn =

American actor (born 1969)

- Born: August 19, 1969 (age 56); United States

Patrick Van Horn (born March 17, 1969) is an American actor. He is best known for his role as Sue in the 1996 film Swingers, starring alongside real-life friends Jon Favreau, Vince Vaughn and Ron Livingston.

He had previously appeared in the Dirty Harry film The Dead Pool (1988), in the Pauly Shore comedy Encino Man (1992), and on the TV series The Fresh Prince of Bel-Air

After Swingers he had roles in the 1999 films Three to Tango and Free Enterprise, and 2008's Four Christmases which reunited him with his Swingers co-stars Vaughn and Favreau.

== Filmography ==
Year	Title	Role	Notes
1988	The Dead Pool	Freeway Reporter #2	
1992	Encino Man	Phil	
1996	Swingers	Sue	
1998	Ivory Tower	Anthony Daytona	
1999	Free Enterprise	Sean	
1999	Three to Tango	Zach	
2001	Pursuit of Happiness	Mike	
2002	Devious Beings	Arrow	
2008	Four Christmases	Darryl	
