= Escândalo! =

Studio album by Angela Ro Ro
- Released: 1981
- Genre: MPB
- Length: 40:27
- Label: PolyGram
- Producer: Antonio Adolfo

Angela Ro Ro chronology
Só Nos Resta Viver (1980)	Escândalo! (1981)	Simples Carinho (1982)

Escândalo! is the third studio album by Brazilian singer-songwriter Angela Ro Ro, released in 1981 by PolyGram under the Polydor Records label.

== Background ==
Escândalo! marks the third album released by Brazilian singer Angela Ro Ro, released in 1981 by PolyGram. Produced by Antonio Adolfo, the album marks a turbulent phase in the singer's career. The tumultuous relationship between Angela Ro Ro and the singer Zizi Possi, which took place in the early 1980s, significantly influenced the production of the album Escândalo!. The end of the relationship was marked by public accusations of physical aggression against Ro Ro, which garnered widespread attention in the Brazilian press and negatively impacted the artist's public image. This controversy served as a thematic catalyst for the album, which explored issues related to media exposure, prejudice against homosexual relationships, and the challenges faced by public figures in the context of the LGBTQIA+ struggle at the time.

The title track "Escândalo", composed by Caetano Veloso specifically for Ro Ro, was directly inspired by an incident during a 1980 performance by Possi, when Ro Ro interrupted the show with statements about their relationship, revealing aspects of Possi's bisexuality and intensifying the scandal. Other songs on the album, such as Na Cama, reflect romantic and personal themes, but the work as a whole incorporates autobiographical elements derived from the controversy, positioning the album as an artistic response to the media turmoil. The album marked a milestone in Ro Ro's career, solidifying her image as a pioneer of lesbian visibility in Brazilian popular music, although it was received with mixed reactions from critics and the public due to the controversial context of its creation.

== Track listing ==
Side 1
No.	Title	Writer(s)	Length
1.	"Perdoai-os, Pai"	Sergio Bandeyra, Angela Ro Ro	3:42
2.	"Came e Case"	Angela Ro Ro	4:40
3.	"Escândalo"	Caetano Veloso	4:18
4.	"Tão Beata, Tão à Toa"	Naila Skorpio, Guto Graça Mello	3:36
5.	"Na Cama"	Naila Skorpio, Sonia Burnier	4:01

Side 2
No.	Title	Writer(s)	Length
1.	"Vou Lá no Fundo"	Naila Skorpio, Sonia Burnier	3:38
2.	"Perco o Rumo"	Naila Skorpio, Guto Graça Mello	2:56
3.	"Fraca e Abusada"	Angela Ro Ro	2:03
4.	"Coitadinha, Bem Feito"	Sergio Bandeyra, Angela Ro Ro	4:22
5.	"Passarinho"	Sergio Bandeyra, Angela Ro Ro	3:13
6.	"Mistério"	Naila Skorpio, Sonia Burnier	3:41
Total length:			40:27

== Release ==
The album was released in 1981 as a long-playing record. In 2002, Universal Music released a CD version of the album.

=== Reception ===
Dirceu Soares, for the newspaper Folha de S. Paulo, gave a glowing review of the album, praising songs like "Mistério" and "Escândalo", as well as comparing Ângela's hoarse voice to big names in Brazilian music, such as Nana Caymmi and Maysa.

=== Tour ===
The album tour included cities such as São Paulo, Brasília, and Rio de Janeiro.

== Musicians ==
The following musicians worked on the album:

- Antonio Adolfo: Piano, Electric Piano
- Angela Ro Ro: vocals
- Alceu: Cavaquinho
- Ariovaldo Contesini: Percussion
- Dino 7 Cordas: Acoustic Guitar
- Formiga: Trumpet
- Jorjão: Bass
- Jorginho: Pandeiro
- Oberdan Magalhães: Saxophone, Flute
- Mamão: Drums Mello, Clovis: A&R [Arregimentador]
- Netinho: Clarinet
- Peninha: Percussion
- Rick: Guitar
- Nilton Rodrigues: Trumpet
