= Angela Ro Ro =

Brazilian singer (1949–2025)

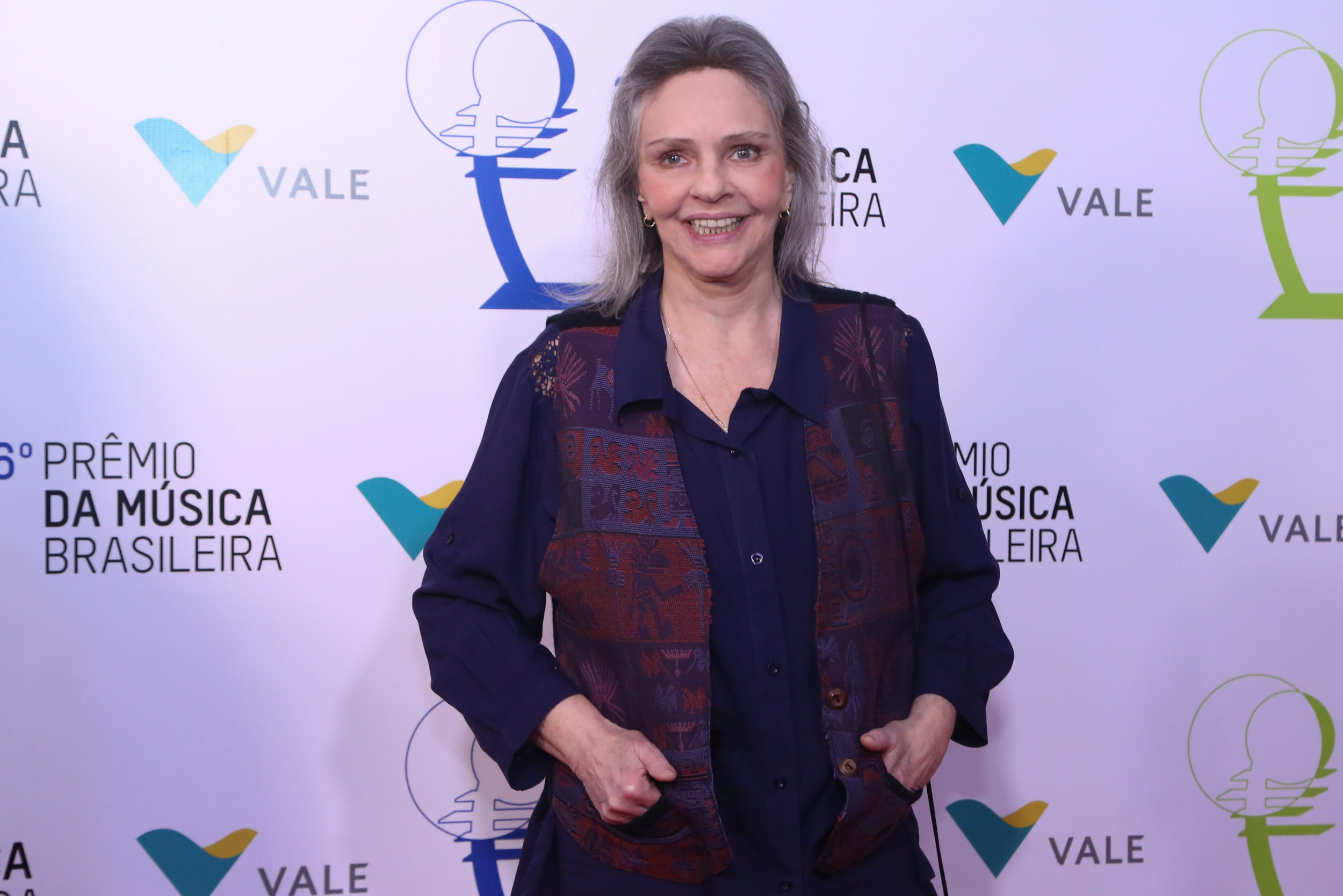
- Angela Ro Ro in 2016

Background information
- Born: Angela Maria Diniz Gonsalves; 5 December 1949; Rio de Janeiro, Brazil
- Died: 8 September 2025 (aged 75) Rio de Janeiro, Brazil
- Occupations: Singer, composer
- Years active: 1979–2025

Angela Maria Diniz Gonsalves (5 December 1949 – 8 September 2025), best known by the stage name Angela Ro Ro, based on an onomatopoeia of her laughter, was a Brazilian singer-songwriter. She was influenced by her idols Ella Fitzgerald, Maysa Matarazzo and Jacques Brel.

Her debut album was voted by Rolling Stone Brazil one of the greatest Brazilian albums of all time. Ro Ro was one of the first singers in Brazil to come out as a lesbian.

From 2004 to 2005, Ro Ro hosted the musical talk show Escândalo on Canal Brasil.

She died on 8 September 2025, at the age of 75.

== Discography ==
- Angela Ro Ro (1979)
- Só Nos Resta Viver (1980)
- Escândalo! (1981)
- Simples Carinho (1982)
- A Vida é Mesmo Assim (1984)
- Eu Desatino (1984)
- Prova De Amor (1988)
- Ao Vivo (1993)
- Acertei No Milênio (2000)
- Compasso (2006)
- Ao Vivo (2006)
- Escândalo (2009)
- Feliz da Vida! (2013)
- Selvagem (2017)
