= Dodie Stevens =

American rock and pop singer (born 1946)

- Born: Geraldine Ann Pasquale; February 17, 1946 (age 80); Chicago, Illinois, U.S.
- Genres: Traditional pop, rock and roll
- Years active: 1954-present
- Labels: Crystalette, Dot, London
- Website: Dodie Stevens website

Dodie Stevens (born Geraldine Ann Pasquale, February 17, 1946) is an American rock and traditional pop singer. She is best known for her 1959 song "Pink Shoe Laces." It debuted at number 96 on the Billboard Hot 100 when Stevens was one day short of 13 years old, and eventually peaked at number 3.

== Early life ==
Stevens was born in Chicago, Illinois, United States. She and her family moved to the San Gabriel Valley in California when she was three. She soon started taking singing and dancing lessons. In 1954, at the age of eight, she recorded her first song, "Merry-Go Merry-Go Round." The song was performed on the Art Linkletter's House Party TV show and was issued on Gold Star Records under the name Geri Pace.

== "Pink Shoe Laces" and early career ==
The president of Crystalette Records, Carl Burns, happened to see her in a local show called Strictly Informal. He gave her the name Dodie Stevens and the song "Pink Shoe Laces". Although Stevens did not initially like her new name or the song, she recorded "Pink Shoe Laces" in 1959 for the Crystalette label, and the song was picked up by Dot for National distribution. It reached number 3 on the Billboard Hot 100 chart, selling more than one million copies, and was awarded a gold disc.

On December 31, 1959, Dodie performed her hit on The Pat Boone Chevy Showroom's New Year's Eve special. For her routine, the variety show built a specialized set meant to mimic a mid-century suburban teenager's bedroom. While performing, Dodie paced the bedroom and sang into a classic home telephone, venting to her friend about her infatuation with a quirky boy named Dooley.

Following the song’s success, Dot Records signed her to a recording contract. Her first Dot recording was "Mairzy Doats" (Dot 16002) in 1959. In the early 1960s, she had several minor hit singles on Dot, including "No" (Dot 16103) and "Yes I'm Lonesome Tonight" (Dot 16167), as well as "Merry, Merry Christmas Baby" (M. Sylvia / G. Lopez) (Dot 16166), which continues to enjoy airplay during the Christmas season. Dot also released Dodie's cover of the Patsy Cline hit "I Fall to Pieces" (Dot 16200) in 1961, and a remake of "Pink Shoe Laces" (Dot 16389) in 1962. She also recorded three non-charting albums for the label:

"Pink Shoe Laces"

- Dodie Stevens (1959)
- Over the Rainbow (1960)
- Pink Shoe Laces (1963)

Stevens appeared in the following films:

- Hound-Dog Man (1959) as Nita Stringer
- Alakazam the Great aka Saiyu-Ki (1961) as DeeDee the Monkey
- Convicts 4 (1962) as Resko’s sister

== Later career and legacy ==
Stevens married at the age of sixteen and moved to Missouri to live on a farm. A few years later, she had a daughter, Stephanie. Soon thereafter, in 1966, she ended her marriage and resumed her singing career. In 1969, she once again appeared in the Billboard charts, peaking at number 117 pop, number 57 country, with "Billy, I've Got to Go to Town" (an answer record to "Ruby, Don't Take Your Love to Town"), recorded under the name Geraldine Stevens. She took additional vocal lessons and, in 1972, began appearing and recording with Sérgio Mendes and Brasil '77. In the ensuing years she toured as a backup singer with such recording artists as Loretta Lynn, Frankie Avalon, and Boz Scaggs, and for twelve years with Mac Davis. In the 1990s, as Geri Stevens, she toured with Fabian and her own company "Dodie Stevens and The Pink Shoe Laces Review." Recently, she has performed with her daughter Stephanie and appeared at oldies concerts across the country. She also teaches singing and stage performance out of her studio in San Diego County.

"Pink Shoe Laces" has appeared in the game LittleBigPlanet 3 and the television show The Marvelous Mrs. Maisel.

== Discography ==
1959

- "Pink Shoe Laces" (US number 3; US R&B number 5)
- "Yes-Sir-Ee" (US number 79)
- "Five Pennies" (US number 89)
- "Miss Lonely Hearts" (US number 111)

1960

- "No" (US number 73)
- "Yes, I’m Lonesome Tonight" (US number 60)
