= Rachel Stephens =

American actress (1930-2018)

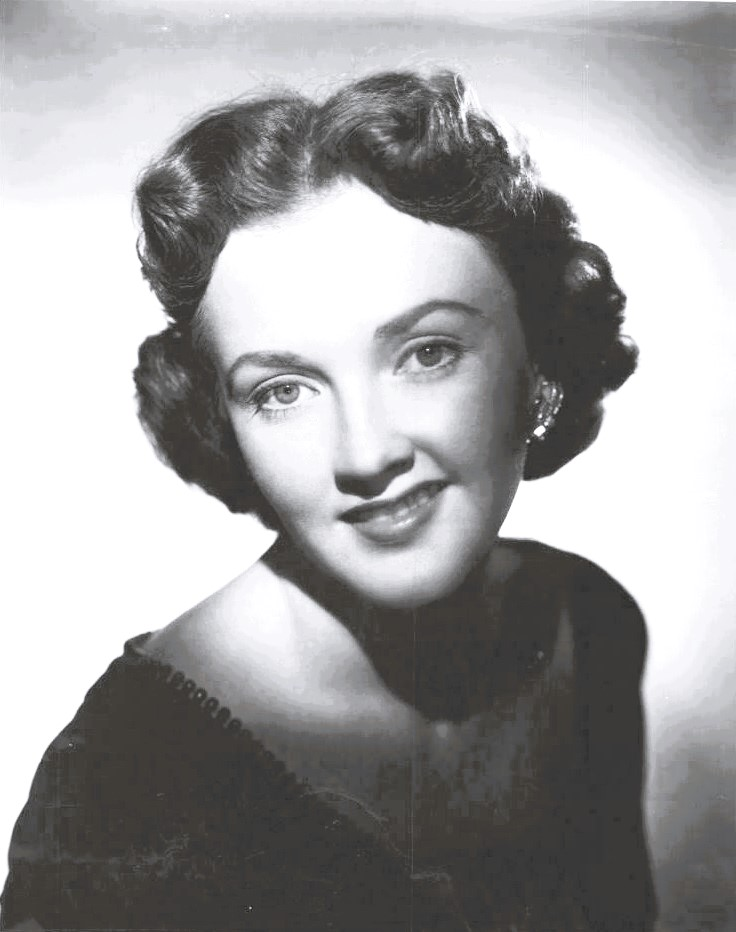
- Stephens in 1956
- Born: Rachel Lou Slagel; October 29, 1930; Mount Carmel, Illinois, U.S.
- Died: December 14, 2018 (aged 88); Evanston, Illinois, U.S.
- Occupation: Actress
- Spouse: Dennis Sook (m. 1979; died 2017)

Rachel Lou Slagel (October 29, 1930 – December 14, 2018), known professionally as Rachel Stephens (Note: Stephens being the maiden name of her mother, Mrs. Lewis Glenn Slagel (the former Mrs. Wilma Atkinson), nee Stephens), was an American television, stage, and motion picture actress.

== Early life and career ==
Born in Mt. Carmel, Illinois, and raised in Fairfield, Stephens was the daughter of Wilma (née Stephens) and railroad engineer Lewis Glenn "Red" Slagel. She attended Fairfield Grade School and Fairfield Community High, and, by 1953, had received both her bachelor's and master's degrees in theatre arts from Indiana University Bloomington

Prior to acting in movies, Stevens was a CBS research assistant and a television actress. Her work on TV led to her being signed for films without a screen test.

== Theater ==
Stephens performed on stage as a reporter in The Best Things In Life Are Free and as the sister of Hope Lange in Bus Stop (play) (1955). In 1972 she appeared with Jo Anne Worley at the Arlington Park Theater in Chicago. Stephens played Charlie's former mistress in a rendition of the comedy Goodbye Charlie by George Axelrod.

She was part of a cast which toured with Van Johnson in the comedy Send Me No Flowers, in 1976. In 1980 she was featured in the Neil Simon play The Gingerbread Lady. Stephens starred as Toby, an aging beauty who needs to be constantly reminded that she is attractive.

In 2003 she portrayed Ruby in Twilight Serenade.

== Movie actress ==
Stephens was signed to a film contract by Twentieth Century Fox in May 1956. In her first movie she played a nurse in Bigger Than Life (1956). The film was a drama which starred James Mason and Barbara Rush. Stephens next appeared in Oh, Men! Oh, Women! (1957) directed by Nunnally Johnson and produced by Cheryl Crawford.

In The True Story of Jesse James (1957), she has the part of Anne James.

Stephens has an uncredited part, as Miss Trimmingham, in From the Terrace (1960). Her option was renewed by 20th Century Fox in February 1960. The adaptation of the John O'Hara novel stars Paul Newman and Joanne Woodward. It received a Golden Globe nomination. Her last film appearance came in 1994 in Ri¢hie Ri¢h as Richie's secretary.

Stephens's duties in Hollywood included substituting for female stars in screen tests of male prospective actors.

== Private life ==
Stephens dated Nico Minardos until they broke up in January 1959.

From 1979 until his death in October 2017, Stephens was married to fellow stage actor Dennis Sook, whom she had met in 1978, in the first in a series of joint appearances in dinner theater productions starring Van Johnson.

Stephens died a year later at St. Francis Hospital in Evanston, Illinois, at age 88. Her remains are interred at Maple Hill Cemetery in Fairfield, alongside those of her husband,
