= Pink Shoe Laces =

1959 single by Dodie Stevens

Single by Dodie Stevens

from the album Pink Shoe Laces
- B-side: "Coming of Age"
- Released: February 1959
- Genre: Pop, Novelty song
- Label: Crystalette
- Songwriter: Micki Grant

"Pink Shoe Laces" (or "Pink Shoelaces") is a song composed by Micki Grant that was recorded by Dodie Stevens, accompanied by Bobby Hammack and his Orchestra, and released as a single in 1959 on Crystalette Records, a record label distributed by Dot Records. Although the verses are delivered with a musical quality, they are not sung in the style of the chorus. Some commentators have observed that the verses are spoken rather than sung.

== Content ==
The song is about a fellow named Dooley, with whom the singer is in love, who has a rather unconventional lifestyle and a decidedly off-the-beaten-pathway fashion sense; his favorite articles of dress being "tan shoes with pink shoelaces, a polka-dot vest, and a big Panama with a purple hatband."

He takes the young lady "deep sea fishing in a submarine", to "drive-in movies in a limousine" and owns a "whirly-birdy and a 12 foot yacht."

When he feels that war is afoot, he enlists in the armed forces, but gets put into the brig for "raising such a storm" when they "tried to put him in a uniform", preferring to wear his unconventional signature garb.

One day, he feels poorly and decides to write out his will, stating: "Just before the angels come to carry me, I want it down in writin' how to bury me", requesting to be buried in his preferred attire. The voice heard speaking the line was Randy Van Horne, the founder of the Randy Van Horne Singers who sang the themes from The Flintstones, The Jetsons and many others.

== Chart performance ==
The single reached number 3 on the Billboard Hot 100 in April 1959. "Pink Shoe Laces" also reached number 5 on the Hot R&B Sides chart. It sold more than a million copies. It also reached number 3 in Canada.

== Track listing ==
Side A. "Pink Shoe Laces"
Side B. "Coming of Age"

== Cover versions ==
- The Chordettes' rendition has them speaking and singing all of the lyrics, except for Dooley's Will, which is spoken by a male voice. Recording and release dates are unconfirmed (although one source suggests a release date in March 1959).
  - This rendition was featured in the 2014 video game LittleBigPlanet 3.
  - This version was also used in 2019 for a dance on The Marvelous Mrs. Maisel; TikTok creator performances went viral in 2023.
- In 1959, Roberta Shore along with the backup of The Lennon Sisters, sang a cover of the song on The Lawrence Welk Show. This version is unique as it is not only sung as a solo from Roberta Shore, but also has sections of a harmony trio from the Lennon sisters. It also noted that the person playing Dooley in this version was played by Rocky Rockwell.
- In 1960, Mexican rock and roll group Los Hooligans recorded a Spanish-language take titled "Agujetas de color de rosa". Their version was highly popular in Mexico, topping the charts for 9 weeks in 1961, and became one of the first rock and roll hits in that country.
  - In 1994, singing trio Curvas Peligrosas covered this Spanish version; this was used as one of the official soundtracks of TV series of the title that was derived from the song.
