= List of number-one hits of 1961 (Mexico) =

This is a list of the songs that reached number one in Mexico in 1961, according to Billboard magazine with data provided by Audiomusica.

== Chart history ==
Issue date	Song	Artist	Ref
April 8	"Mi pueblo"	César Costa	
April 21	"Chica alborotada"	Los Locos del Ritmo	
April 28	"Creí"	Juan Mendoza	
May 5	"Suspenso infernal"	Los Dandys	
May 12	"Más allá"	Los Tres Diamantes	
May 19	"Ay, mexicanita"	Julio Jaramillo	
May 26	"Y..."	Javier Solís	
June 5	"Escándalo"	Marco Antonio Muñiz	
June 12	"Escándalo"	Marco Antonio Muñiz	
June 19	"Escándalo"	Marco Antonio Muñiz	
June 26	"Presumida"	Los Teen Tops	
July 3	"Presumida"	Los Teen Tops	
July 10	"Presumida"	Los Teen Tops	
July 17	"Presumida"	Los Teen Tops	
July 24	"Presumida"	Los Teen Tops	
July 31	"Escándalo"	Marco Antonio Muñiz/Javier Solís/Juan Mendoza	
August 7	"Escándalo"	Marco Antonio Muñiz/Javier Solís/Juan Mendoza	
August 14	"Agujetas de color de rosa"	Los Hooligans	
August 21	"Agujetas de color de rosa"	Los Hooligans	
August 28	"Agujetas de color de rosa"	Los Hooligans	
September 4	"Escándalo"	Marco Antonio Muñiz/Javier Solís	
September 11	"Escándalo"	Marco Antonio Muñiz/Javier Solís	
September 18	"Agujetas de color de rosa"	Los Hooligans	
September 25	"Agujetas de color de rosa"	Los Hooligans	
October 2	"Agujetas de color de rosa"	Los Hooligans	
October 9	"Escándalo"	Marco Antonio Muñiz/Javier Solís	
October 16	"Agujetas de color de rosa"	Los Hooligans	
October 23	"Agujetas de color de rosa"	Los Hooligans	
October 30	"Agujetas de color de rosa"	Los Hooligans	
November 6	"Popotitos"	Los Teen Tops	
November 13	"Popotitos"	Los Teen Tops	
November 20	"Popotitos"	Los Teen Tops	
November 27	"Popotitos"	Los Teen Tops	
December 4	"Popotitos"	Los Teen Tops	
December 11	"Popotitos"	Los Teen Tops	
December 18	"Popotitos"	Los Teen Tops	
December 25	"Popotitos"	Los Teen Tops	
December 30	"Popotitos"	Los Teen Tops	

=== By country of origin ===
Number-one artists:

Country of origin	Number of artists	Artists
Mexico	9	César Costa
Mexico	9	Los Locos del Ritmo
Mexico	9	Juan Mendoza
Mexico	9	Los Dandys
Mexico	9	Los Tres Diamantes
Mexico	9	Javier Solís
Mexico	9	Marco Antonio Muñiz
Mexico	9	Los Teen Tops
Mexico	9	Los Hooligans
Ecuador	1	Julio Jaramillo

Number-one compositions (it denotes the country of origin of the song's composer[s]; in case the song is a cover of another one, the name of the original composition is provided in parentheses):

Country of origin	Number of compositions	Compositions
Mexico	3	"Creí"
Mexico	3	"Suspenso infernal"
Mexico	3	"Escándalo"
United States	3	"Chica alborotada" ("Tallahassee Lassie")
United States	3	"Agujetas de color de rosa" ("Pink Shoelaces")
United States	3	"Popotitos" ("Bony Moronie")
Canada	1	"Mi pueblo" ("My Hometown")
Italy	1	"Más allá" ("Al di lá")
Ecuador	1	"Ay, mexicanita"
Dominican Republic	1	"Y..."
United Kingdom	1	"Presumida" ("High Class Baby")

== See also ==
- 1961 in music
