= Fenton Jones =

Fenton "Jonesy" Jones
- Born: June 2, 1907; Los Angeles, California
- Origin: Glendale, California
- Died: June 30, 2003 (aged 96); Glendale, California
- Genres: Folk and square dance calling
- Labels: C. J. McGregor, others below

Fenton G. "Jonesy" Jones (June 2, 1907 – June 30, 2003) was an American musician, best known as a square dance caller. He was widely described as a "nationally-known [dance] caller".

Jones was born in 1907 in Los Angeles, California. His mother, who died when Jones was seven years old, was a pianist and guitarist. Jones began calling dances in 1940, touring the United States and calling at various square dancing events. He also called dances regularly at his home state of California. He was known for dressing up in a Western-style at his events he worked, once stating that "short sleeves have been eliminated" while describing what he saw as a "rigid" dress code for square dance callers in a 1952 article. Jones also released records of his calls under the C. P. MacGregor Records label, including "My Little Girl", "Down Yonder" and "Oh Johnny". He had previously recorded his calls, first in 1946 on the Black and White then on Imperial, Capitol, MGM and Mastertone labels. Jones also appeared in many films television series in the 1970s and 1980s, most often uncredited, as a square dance caller.

Jones was married to Florence. He is a member of the Square Dance Hall of Fame. He died in 2003. He had resided in Glendale, California for majority of his life.

== Television ==
| Year | Title | Role | Notes |
|---|---|---|---|
| 1961 | Rawhide | Square Dance Caller | S3:E21, "Incident of His Brother's Keeper" |
