= High Time (film) =

1960 film by Blake Edwards

- Theatrical release poster
- Directed by: Blake Edwards
- Screenplay by: Frank Waldman; Tom Waldman
- Story by: Garson Kanin
- Produced by: Charles Brackett
- Starring: Bing Crosby; Fabian; Tuesday Weld; Nicole Maurey
- Cinematography: Ellsworth Fredericks
- Edited by: Robert L. Simpson
- Music by: Henry Mancini
- Production company: Bing Crosby Productions
- Distributed by: 20th Century Fox
- Release date: September 16, 1960 (USA)
- Running time: 103 minutes
- Country: United States
- Language: English
- Budget: $2,815,000
- Box office: $2.5 million (US/ Canada)

High Time is a 1960 American comedy film directed by Blake Edwards and starring Bing Crosby, Fabian, Tuesday Weld, and Nicole Maurey. The film is told from the perspective of middle-aged man Harvey Howard who enters the world of a new generation of postwar youth.

In the years since its release, High Time has come to be viewed as a comedic study of the slowly emerging generation gap between the music and mores of an older generation and postwar youth, as well as an inadvertent time capsule of American adolescents and lifestyles in 1960. The film's song "The Second Time Around" was nominated for the Academy Award for Best Original Song.

== Plot ==
Wealthy restaurateur Harvey Howard, a self-made man, widower, and owner of Harvey Howard Smokehouses, decides to go back to college at the age of 51 and earn a bachelor's degree. He faces opposition from his snobbish grown children Harvey Jr. and Laura, as well as a generation gap between himself and his much-younger fellow students. The first day in school, he finds that just convincing older students, faculty, and administrators that he is serious is a humorous task. He enrolls and receives freshman rooming, and is up front about his determination to be "just another freshman". He's assigned a quad rooming arrangement, which sets precedent for the upcoming years - dealing with the student press, the dorm adviser Professor Thayer, and making that first toast with sauerkraut juice to seal their bond to complete their four years together.

University President Byrne's welcoming speech sets the tone for the effort facing the freshman class. Harvey has to convince the phys ed coach that he has what it takes to compete by doing ten plus one pull-ups to the cheers of his fellow younger frosh, only to collapse on his face upon finishing his set. Another frosh challenge is the bonfire that must exceed the height of the prior years. Harvey meets the French professor, Helene Gauthier, when removing a supporting wooden box from under her porch. The bonfire's total height comes up a foot short; Harvey climbs to the summit and deposits his three-foot chair. Having two brilliant roommates, T.J. Padmanagham and Bob Bannerman, and jock Gil Sparrow, the academic rigors are always fuel for comedy and camaraderie. Science Professor Thayer is haphazard, and numerous comedic moments ensue including chemicals that take on a life of their own, pairs of wires that should never be brought near each other during a storm, and improving one's skating skills except on thin ice.

Sophomore year again has Harvey being berated by Harvey Jr. and Laura, but the school's beat reporter is there to welcome him and puts up with the snobby kids. Harvey is off to meet his last year's roommates and the requisite toast to success. He is asked to join their fraternity and has the usual hazing period to endure, polishing shoes, washing floors, and the most challenging, dressing in drag and getting retired colonel Judge Carter to sign his dance card at a costume ball. The elderly southern gentleman Carter is suffering a gout attack and his social climbing children are attending the same event. While dancing with Harvey Jr., Harvey so discombobulates him that his dress is torn in half, and while having it fixed in the ladies lounge, he floors Laura. Back on the floor, Harvey bribes the band leader to play "Dixie", Judge Carter stands, Harvey pounces into his arms, dancing the length of the floor, deposits the sputtering Carter on his easy chair, has him autograph his dance card, throws his wig into his lap, and rushes the exit. The rest of the year is full of great football by Gil, academic pressure, and more antics by Professor Thayer.

Junior year starts with Harvey arriving in a red Mercedes convertible, and meeting the group at a Harvey Howard Smokehouse for a toast of goat milk, which only T.J. likes. The Smokehouse maître D' at Harvey Howard's, super-snob Burdick, doesn't like one bit of this. His first task is to rudely challenge the group to order their meals, which is fine with Harvey, who orders Harvey Burgers with special sauce for the lot. Burdick sneers back that it's too early for the special sauce. Navy brat Bob chimes in with "... it's later than you think". The burgers arrive and are dry, carbonized, and inedible. Harvey, who stands behind all burgers served in his Smokehouses, calls Burdick over to "take them back". Burdick challenges Harvey to do better, which he does. Burdick, watching Harvey jump to it at the grill, catches Harvey Howard's full name and faints. Burdick completes eating a burger prepared by Harvey and becomes a transformed Harvey employee. Over the summer, prior to junior year, Harvey had hired Professor Gauthier to tutor him at Nag's Head. Harvey Jr. and Laura, in turn, complain to the college and it appears that Professor Gauthier has to resign to save face. The students protest and President Byrne delays any action until the next spring.

For senior year, Harvey arrives in a taxi. The group gathers and toast their final year. Both Harvey and Gil are still hitting the books hard, with some success. The year features hay rides, phone booth body jams, and a smooth procession towards graduation. Harvey is in denial about his love of Professor Gauthier, and she coyly asks him if he would like to marry her. He stammers, but the gauntlet is thrown. Harvey is the Class of 1960 valedictorian and his speech covers all the bases: why he challenged himself to find a greater purpose and put up with the struggle, and his growing admiration and acceptance of the accomplishments of his adult children and his friends. He concludes with a final challenge to the graduate: never quit, never say something like "I could no sooner do that, than I could fly." At this moment, Harvey is hoisted above the audience on cables to fly around the auditorium as he winks to Professor Gauthier and smiles to the crowd.

== Cast ==
- Bing Crosby as Harvey Howard
- Fabian Forte as Gil Sparrow
- Tuesday Weld as Joy Elder
- Nicole Maurey as Prof. Helene Gauthier
- Richard Beymer as Bob Bannerman
- Patrick Adiarte as T.J. Padmanagham
- Yvonne Craig as Randy "Scoop" Pruitt
- Jimmy Boyd as Robert Higgson
- Gavin MacLeod as Professor Thayer
- Kenneth MacKenna as President Byrne
- Nina Shipman as Laura Howard
- Angus Duncan as Harvey Howard Jr.
- Paul von Schreiber as Crump
- Harold Ayer as Student
- Jimmy Baya as Band Leader
- Carla Borelli as Harvey Jr.'s Date
- Harry Carter as Harvey's Chauffeur
- Alvin Childress as Guest Announcer
- Donald Cockburn as Basketball Coach
- Dick Crockett as Bones McKinney
- Douglass Dumbrille as Judge Carter
- Opal Euard as Mrs. Carter
- Frank Fowler as Professor
- Ruby Goodwin as Maid
- Ray Hamilton as Laura's Date
- John Page Harrington as Heazlett
- Byron Kane as Professor
- Jean Paul King as Professor
- James Lanphier as Burdick
- Johnny Lee as Servant
- Mary Patton as Matron
- Edmund T. Peckham as Professor
- Ray A. Rustigan as Hedgepeth
- Art Salter as Gas Station Attendant
- Jeffrey Sayre as Man at Dance
- Frank J. Scannell as Auctioneer
- Elisabeth Talbot-Martin as Matron
- Emerson Treacy as Professor
- Janice Trotter as Student
- Irene Vernon as Matron
- Ernestine Wade as Maid

== Production ==
=== Development ===
High Time was scripted by Garson Kanin, Frank Waldman and Tom Waldman. It was originally titled Big Daddy, with the starring role of Harvey Howard to be played by Gary Cooper. When Cooper's terminal illness forced him to turn down the role, Bing Crosby was signed as lead, and the script was revised to his requirements. The movie was known as Daddy-O before being changed to High Time. Simone Signoret was once announced for the female lead. It was Fabian's second film.

=== Shooting ===
Filming started on February 2, 1960. The movie was shot in Los Angeles at UCLA and in Stockton, California at Stockton Junior High School, Amos Alonzo Stagg Senior High School, the University of the Pacific, and other locations.

The film was originally intended to be filmed at Wake Forest University in Winston-Salem, North Carolina, and this was publicized on campus only weeks before California shooting commenced. In early February 1960, Fox’s director of public relations Frank McCarthy telephoned Wake Forest’s news bureau director, explaining the relocation of filming. After watching rehearsals for the movie, McCarthy reported, “we feel that parts of the action are not in concordance with the oral outline we gave you nor with the traditions of Lake Forest.” As a concession to disappointed students, faculty and alumni, many of the landmarks of Wake Forest University (such as Bostwick Dormitory, then a women's residence hall) are mentioned in the script.

Filming was interrupted by the strike of the Screen Actors Guild on March 7. Fabian's manager was reported as wanting to buy the film so it could be completed. "Now I've heard everything," wrote Hedda Hopper. "Fabian, who admits he can't sing and is perfectly honest about it, has been in our business a little more than a year." The strike ended and filming resumed on April 12. Fabian later called Bing Crosby "a great artist, a great actor, and a great musical person" but "not a nice man.” Richard Beymer began a romantic relationship with Tuesday Weld during filming. Beymer and Weld were both under contract to Fox and would be reunited in Bachelor Flat.

== Music ==
The film introduced the song "The Second Time Around". The song was nominated for an Academy Award for Best Original Song at the 33rd Academy Awards, the last song that Bing Crosby introduced to do so. The song became a hit single for Frank Sinatra, and it later was recorded by a number of artists, including Barbra Streisand for The Movie Album (2003).

The title song "High Time" was adopted in 1961 as the opening theme music for Mr. Peppermint, a long-running children's show in the Dallas–Fort Worth area.

=== Soundtrack ===
- "High Time" (Henry Mancini) - music only
- "The Second Time Around" - sung by Bing Crosby
- "You Tell Me Your Dream" (Charles N. Daniels / Gus Kahn) - sung by Bing Crosby and Nicole Maurey and chorus.
- "It Came Upon the Midnight Clear" - sung by Bing Crosby, Fabian, Nicole Maurey and others.
- "Nobody's Perfect" (Jimmy Van Heusen / Sammy Cahn) - a duet between Crosby and Fabian was omitted from the released print of film.

=== Score ===
The score of High Time was released in 1960 on vinyl by RCA Victor as a 12-track album Music from the Motion Picture Score "High Time". All tracks are by Henry Mancini and performed by Henry Mancini and His Orchestra.

1. "High Time"
2. "Moon Talk"
3. "So Neat"
4. "The Old College Try Cha-Cha"
5. "The Nutty Professor"
6. "Frish Frosh"
7. "The Second Time Around"
8. "A Mild Blast"
9. "Harv's Blues"
10. "New Blood"
11. "The Dean Speaks"
12. "Tiger!"

Personnel

- Henry Mancini - conductor
- Dick Peirce - producer
- Vincent DeRosa - French horn (2)

== Reception ==
The film was released on September 16, 1960 and had a mixed reception. Variety wrote "High Time is pretty lightweight fare for a star of Bing Crosby’s proportions, and all the draw of the Groaner, who only trills twice, will be required to sell it...Crosby handles his role in his usual fashion, perfectly timing his laughs, and delivers a pair of Sammy Cahn-James Van Heusen songs, 'The Second Time Around' and 'Nobody's Perfect'" (sic).

Bosley Crowther of The New York Times was clearly disappointed by it, writing "Thus Mr. Crosby, still pretending to be youthful, goes to college again, but a few necessaries are lacking. One of them is a script. The other is youth. The screen play by Tom and Frank Waldman, based on a story by Garson Kanin, is awfully sad, awfully burdened with hackneyed situations. And Mr. Crosby, alas, is no kid. He tries hard to be casual and boyish, to prove modestly that he's in the groove, to match the animal spirits of the swarming youngsters, such as Fabian and Miss Weld. But as much as director Blake Edwards has tried to help him with a lively beat that keeps the action thumping and gives an illusion of vitality, at least, there is a terrible gauntness and look of exhaustion about Mr. Crosby when the camera gets close and peers at his face. We don't blame his children (in the film) for objecting to his going to college. He should have stayed at home with his feet to the fire."

== See also ==
- List of American films of 1960
