= My Brother and I =

- Dad's Army episode
- Episode no.: Series 8 Episode 7
- Directed by: David Croft
- Written by: Jimmy Perry; David Croft
- Original air date: 26 December 1975
- Running time: 40 minutes

Guest appearances
- Arthur Lowe as Barry Mainwaring; Penny Irving as Chambermaid; Arnold Diamond as Major-General

Episode chronology
← Previous "The Face on the Poster"	Next → "The Love of Three Oranges"

"My Brother and I" is the second Christmas special of the British television sitcom Dad's Army. It was originally transmitted on Friday, 26 December 1975. The episode features Arthur Lowe in a dual role as his regular role of Captain Mainwaring and as Mainwaring's estranged brother Barry.

== Synopsis ==
Just as Captain Mainwaring gives the go-ahead for a sherry party, his drunken brother Barry turns up to spoil the occasion.

== Plot ==
As Mainwaring and the platoon return from an exhausting route march, he discovers Wilson reading Pike's Hotspur comic. There is a letter written in Pike's handwriting hidden amongst the pages. Mainwaring reads it and is instantly disgusted. He convenes an impromptu parade, where he confronts Pike about the letter, and asks Wilson to read it. It says that "the Home Guard will only spot any parachutists if they land in a public house", and that their section "made sure there were no parachutists in eleven pubs in two hours!"

Mainwaring makes the platoon promise that he will not hear any more stories about his men drinking on duty. He goes on to say that he has offered to be the host for a sherry party for local civic dignitaries and army officers. Jones' section (with the exception of Frazer, who is "meeting" a client in Eastbourne) volunteer themselves as stewards. When they leave, Mainwaring praises his men, declaring them "indispensable". Wilson asks if Mainwaring was harsh about the public house business, but Mainwaring does not think he was, and blames it on the way he was brought up, claiming every member of his family "knew when to stop".

Meanwhile, in a train carriage, a drunken figure with more than a passing resemblance to Mainwaring downs a hip flask of Scotch. The train stops at Eastbourne, and Frazer joins the man in the carriage, and quickly learns that the drunken man is Mainwaring's black sheep brother Barry, and that he is on his way to Walmington to collect a half-hunter watch that, he claims, Mainwaring stole from him after their father's death. Frazer is more than happy to tell Mainwaring that his brother is in town.

A few days later, Mainwaring tells Wilson that he is not ashamed of his brother, but he feels that Barry let his talents go to waste, while Mainwaring himself became a respected and trustworthy figure who can "look the world full in the face". Barry rings and Mainwaring declines the call, leaving it to Wilson. Mainwaring tells Wilson to tell Barry that he will meet him at the Red Lion Inn.

When he gets there, he confronts Barry about the watch. Barry claims that their father intended to give him the watch for looking after him. Mainwaring scoffs at Barry's attempts to look after their father and refuses to hand over the watch. Barry blackmails his brother by saying that he will show him up at the sherry party if he does not. Mainwaring reluctantly hands over the watch, getting Barry's solemn oath that he will be out of Walmington on the 9:30 train.

The party goes well until Barry unexpectedly arrives, wanting to apologise for his earlier behaviour, and gets into a lengthy chat with Chief Warden Hodges, the Vicar and the Verger. Pike drags him into the dressing room, giving him a whole bottle of sherry to placate him. Mainwaring arrives, and Hodges gleefully tells him that he had a chat with his brother. Mainwaring is shocked and asks Wilson, Frazer, Jones, Sponge and Pike to get him out as soon as possible.

They try shoving Barry through the window, but he is too fat, so they carry him out in an empty cupboard. Wilson gives Mainwaring the watch that he retrieved from Barry, but Mainwaring's heart of gold allows him to give the watch back to Wilson, and he tells Wilson to give it back to Barry and wish him well.

== Cast ==
=== Main ===
- Arthur Lowe as Captain Mainwaring
- John Le Mesurier as Sergeant Wilson
- Clive Dunn as Lance Corporal Jones
- John Laurie as Private Frazer
- Arnold Ridley as Private Godfrey
- Ian Lavender as Private Pike
- Bill Pertwee as ARP Warden Hodges
- Frank Williams as The Vicar
- Colin Bean as Private Sponge

=== Guest ===
- Arthur Lowe as Barry Mainwaring
- Penny Irving as Chambermaid
- Arnold Diamond as Major-General

== Production ==
This episode was recorded at the BBC Television Centre on 23 and 24 May 1975. Several wartime songs were included in this episode, including "We Must All Stick Together" and "A Room with a View".

In a 2000 interview with writer Graham McCann, Ian Lavender claimed that this episode was a "real eye-opener" to him, since he realised that the series writers were now comfortable enough to write about any topic (notably the conflict between Captain Mainwaring and his brother Barry) even if it was not specifically related to the Home Guard or the Second World War. Lavender claimed that this episode made him realise that the series had "really made it" and was "something special".

Co-writer David Croft recalled that the episode was "very complicated" to complete, owing to Arthur Lowe's dual role as Captain and Barry Mainwaring. Lowe was required to complete his scenes first as one Mainwaring, then as the other, therefore having to deliver his lines without the reaction from another actor. These scenes, Croft claimed, were "technically quite difficult, particularly in those days" to complete.

Croft later described Captain Mainwaring's brother, Barry, as a "lovely character" and expressed regret that the character did not appear in a further episode.

== Broadcast ==
The episode, which originally aired at 6:05 pm on Friday, 26 December 1975, was watched by 13.6 million viewers, making it the least-watched Christmas special of the series. The episode was later repeated in 1976, New Year's Eve 1980, Christmas Day 1989, 1993 and 2000.

This episode, along with "When You've Got to Go" and "Never Too Old", was adapted by David Benson and Jack Lane as radio episodes. These adapted episodes, along with several Dad's Army radio episodes, made up their touring stage show, Dad's Army Radio Hour, later renamed Dad's Army Radio Show, which toured throughout the UK from 2017 to 2021. Recordings of these three adapted episodes were subsequently released by Big Finish Productions on CD in 2024.

== Reception ==
In his 2001 Dad's Army book, Graham McCann claimed that this Christmas special "ended the year in style" for series eight, praising the "glorious tour de force" of Arthur Lowe in his dual role as Captain Mainwaring and his brother Barry. Speaking in the 2005 documentary We Are the Boys...:Arthur Lowe, McCann later described the episode as being "great", hailing Lowe's dual role a "marvellous performance".

A scene in this episode involving Captain Mainwaring and his brother Barry is considered to be one of the "great[est] scenes" in the series.

In the 2007 documentary Dad's Army: The Passing Years, Frank Williams described the episode as being "most wonderful", praising particularly the dual role of Lowe, which he described as being "absolutely brilliant". Pamela Cundell similarly praised Lowe's "smashing" performance as the drunk Barry, as did David Croft, who believed Lowe played the part of Barry "beautifully".

In a 2018 article, television presenter Alexander Armstrong considered this episode to be his favourite. Armstrong praised Lowe's dual performance, particularly a scene in which Lowe, as Barry, is drunk, which Armstrong regarded as "one of the funniest scenes – I think – that Croft and Perry ever wrote".
