= Never Too Old =

- Dad's Army episode
- Episode no.: Series 9 Episode 6
- Directed by: David Croft
- Written by: Jimmy Perry; David Croft
- Original air date: 13 November 1977
- Running time: 35 minutes

Episode chronology
← Previous "Number Engaged"	Next → —

"Never Too Old" is the final episode of the ninth series and the last ever episode of the British television sitcom Dad's Army. It was originally broadcast on Sunday, 13 November 1977, the same day of the Remembrance Sunday 1977 Commemorations.

== Synopsis ==
A wedding between Lance Corporal Jones and Mrs Fox is announced and takes place, but the reception is interrupted as the platoon are put on full invasion alert.

== Plot ==
Mrs Fox stops by the church hall in search of Jones, but she is met by Godfrey, who tells her that the rest of the platoon has gone for a march and will not be back for some time. Mrs Fox then tells Godfrey that she was going to call Jones to "put him out of his misery".

When the platoon arrive back, they notice that Jones is missing. Pike and Frazer then reveal that he failed to turn right on the march and just kept walking straight. Jones then arrives late in a very cheerful mood and asks Mainwaring for a private talk. He reveals to Mainwaring and Wilson that he has asked Mrs Fox to marry him and wants Mainwaring's permission to do so. Mainwaring agrees, and Mrs Fox telephones and tells Jones that she will marry him.

At the wedding ceremony, Mainwaring has agreed to give Mrs Fox away and Wilson has agreed to be best man. The reception follows, and Mainwaring is surprised when Wilson turns up in his uniform from the First World War (having been forced to do so by Mrs Pike who has hidden his trousers), revealing he was a captain. Wilson is then surprised when he learns he must toast the matron of honour, Mrs Pike.

A much-needed change of pace is welcome when everyone celebrated the happiness of the wedding, but it is drastically cut short when the Colonel informs Mainwaring of an invasion alert and thinks it may not be a bluff. Jones and Pike are then sent to keep watch at the pier where Mrs Fox comes to meet them. While Jones and Mrs Fox are discussing their future, Mainwaring and the rest of the platoon arrive with a bottle of champagne to drink to Jones' good health. Hodges interrupts them and tells them that the invasion alert was a false alarm and the stand down order had been given half an hour earlier. Hodges claims it is just as well, because Mainwaring and his platoon would be "no good" against real soldiers. After Hodges leaves, Mainwaring, Wilson, Jones, Fraser, Pike and Godfrey all agree that "no-one is getting past them" and that there are "hundreds of men just like them" who are willing to fight for their freedom.

In the end, Wilson suggests that they make a toast to the Home Guard. Mainwaring agrees and the platoon raise their glasses as they turn towards the camera to say in unison: "To Britain's Home Guard".

== Cast ==
- Arthur Lowe as Captain Mainwaring
- John Le Mesurier as Sergeant Wilson
- Clive Dunn as Lance Corporal Jones
- John Laurie as Private Frazer
- Arnold Ridley as Private Godfrey
- Ian Lavender as Private Pike
- Bill Pertwee as ARP Warden Hodges
- Frank Williams as The Vicar
- Edward Sinclair as The Verger
- Pamela Cundell as Mrs Fox
- Janet Davies as Mrs Pike
- Colin Bean as Private Sponge
- Joan Cooper as Dolly
- Robert Raglan as The Colonel

== Production ==
=== Casting ===
This episode featured the final regular appearances of Arthur Lowe as Captain George Mainwaring, John Le Mesurier as Sergeant Arthur Wilson, Clive Dunn as Lance Corporal Jack Jones, John Laurie as Private James Frazer, Arnold Ridley as Private Charles Godfrey and Ian Lavender as Private Frank Pike.

The principal cast's wives and girlfriends who held Equity cards appeared as wedding guests during this episode's wedding scene.

=== Filming and broadcast ===
This episode was recorded at the BBC Television Centre in London on Friday, 29 July 1977. It was broadcast on the same day of the Remembrance Sunday 1977 Commemorations.

In a 2000 interview with writer/historian Graham McCann, series co-writer David Croft recalled that final day of filming "was a very emotional evening. The production gallery were unusually quiet throughout the recording, and, as the end drew near, there were plenty of people with lumps in their throats.'

This episode was rebroadcast on BBC One on Monday, 8 May 1995, as part of the programming celebrating the 50th anniversary of VE Day.

== Deaths ==
Three years after Dad's Army ended, John Laurie died on 23 June 1980 from emphysema, followed by Arthur Lowe on 15 April 1982 (stroke), John Le Mesurier on 15 November 1983 (cirrhosis of the liver), Arnold Ridley on 12 March 1984 (fall), Clive Dunn on 6 November 2012 (complications from an operation) and Ian Lavender on 2 February 2024 (urosepsis and bladder cancer) which means that there are now no surviving cast members of Dad's Army.

== Reception ==
"Never Too Old" attracted an average of 12,524,000 viewers, and scored an Audience Appreciation Index of 77. The Audience Research Report for the episode was highly positive: 'It was felt that all the characters had been beautifully portrayed [...] The production, too, was highly praised for bringing out a convincing sense of period and for paying great attention to detail. Altogether, it was generally agreed that the programme had always been magnificent, that the cast could not have been better chosen and it was sad to see the series come to an end.'

Paul Fiddick, writing for The Guardian the day after broadcast on 14 November 1977, wrote that the series was 'one of the jewels of TV comedy'. He went on to write: 'It is bound to be remembered for sentiment and nostalgia, and it's made the most of those, but that makes it all the more necessary to record, as the absolutely final credits roll, that it has given us finer farces, straighter faces, richer characterisation, and a deal more social observation, than most of the most pretentious dramas, and always kept us guessing which would turn up next. [...] It will be missed.'
