= The Face on the Poster =

- Dad's Army episode
- Episode no.: Series 8 Episode 6
- Directed by: David Croft
- Story by: Jimmy Perry and David Croft
- Original air date: 10 October 1975
- Running time: 30 minutes

Episode chronology
← Previous "High Finance"	Next → "My Brother and I"

"The Face on the Poster" is the sixth episode of the eighth series of the British comedy series Dad's Army. It was originally transmitted on 10 October 1975.

== Synopsis ==
The platoon begin a recruiting campaign, and Jones is chosen as the face for the poster. Unfortunately, due to a mistake at the printers, his face ends up on an escaped prisoner of war poster.

== Plot ==
Wilson enters Mainwaring's office to find him writing a Confidential Report about him. Mainwaring shows it to him so he can sign it and make sure he is playing fair. Wilson scoffs at his attempts, comparing it to a headmaster's end-of-term report. Mainwaring is not quite so blasé, and hints that the Confidential Report could lead to big changes. He hints that he may be promoted to major very soon, and admits he wants to start a recruiting campaign to triple the platoon and turn it into a company.

He convenes a parade and tells them of his plan. Jones suggests a poster similar to that of Lord Kitchener's recruitment poster, and Mainwaring is delighted with the suggestion. Jones then suggests a secret ballot to decide the face for the poster, and Frazer decides to bring in a professional photographer. Jones wins the ballot by a large margin and the photographer turns out to be Mr Blewitt. After four unsuccessful attempts, the photo is taken, and Wilson takes it round to the printers.

At the printers, a police officer is asking for a Wanted poster of an escaped prisoner of war to be printed. The photo is placed on the out-tray along with Jones' photo on top. Two days later, Godfrey brings in a sample of the poster, and the platoon discover that the disorganised printer mixed the photographs up. Jones now appears to be a wanted man.

Jones notices the poster outside a Free Polish Club (not, as Pike mistakenly believes, somewhere giving away free polish). A Polish Army major comes out, comments on the poster, "Ugly-looking swine," and then sees Jones is the man on the poster. Jones is arrested and interrogated; despite his protests, the major persists in believing Jones is the escapee, and puts him in the local POW camp.

Meanwhile, a laughing Warden Hodges brings one of the Wanted posters to the church hall and shows it to Mainwaring. Mr Blewitt arrives and tells them about Jones' arrest. Hodges drives Mainwaring and the rest of the platoon to the POW camp to try to rescue him, but after a poor choice of words, they too are arrested. Once in the major's office, Mainwaring puts his foot in it by declaring Jones is his colleague, and they are all placed in the POW camp with Jones. Wilson comments that the Colonel will not be very impressed with what happened, and wonders what he will write in Mainwaring's Confidential Report.

== Cast ==
- Arthur Lowe as Captain Mainwaring
- John Le Mesurier as Sergeant Wilson
- Clive Dunn as Lance Corporal Jones
- John Laurie as Private Frazer
- Arnold Ridley as Private Godfrey
- Ian Lavender as Private Pike
- Bill Pertwee as ARP Warden Hodges
- Edward Sinclair as The Verger
- Frank Williams as The Vicar
- Harold Bennett as Mr Blewitt
- Colin Bean as Private Sponge
- Peter Butterworth as Mr Bugden, the Printer
- Bill Tasker as Fred
- Michael Bevis as Police Sergeant
- Gabor Vernon as Polish Army Major

== Notes ==
1. Gabor Vernon, who played the Polish Major in this episode, also played the Russian VIP, Mr Vladislovski, in the earlier episode "The Honourable Man" (1973).
