= Number Engaged =

- Dad's Army episode
- Episode no.: Series 9 Episode 5
- Directed by: Bob Spiers
- Written by: Jimmy Perry; David Croft
- Original air date: 6 November 1977
- Running time: 30 minutes

Episode chronology
| ← Previous "The Miser's Hoard" | Next → "Never Too Old" |

"Number Engaged" is the fifth episode of the ninth and final series of the British television sitcom Dad's Army. It was originally broadcast on 6 November 1977 on BBC1 and was the penultimate episode of the series.

== Synopsis ==
The platoon is tasked with guarding the new telephone wires that have been set up along the coast. During the night, an air raid occurs, and upon waking, the platoon discover an unexploded bomb caught in the wires.

== Plot ==
The platoon has been assigned to guard a two-mile stretch of telephone wires that are vital for the war effort. Arriving at the site in Jones's van, Mainwaring orders Frazer to prepare the next morning's breakfast. However, Frazer explains that he cannot cook the porridge since he must catch the trout for dinner, so Mainwaring appoints Pike to prepare the porridge. Before departing, Frazer gives Pike the recipe of 'one jug of water to one mug of porridge' for every man present.

During the night an air raid occurs, and the next morning, while eating breakfast, Pike asks Mainwaring what he should do with the leftover porridge he has prepared. Pike mixed up Frazer's measurements, and upon discovering the leftovers, which are enough to feed 'a hundred men', Mainwaring calls Pike a 'stupid boy'.

Soon, the Vicar arrives to perform the morning Holy Communion open-air service. As the platoon raise their heads in prayer, they notice the unexploded bomb in the telephone wires. Following several attempts to dislodge the bomb, Wilson suggests that they use the crane at the construction site up the road. Jones is raised onto the wires, but being unable to reach, he climbs onto the pole and attempts to lift the bomb and remove it. However, he loses his grip and the bomb falls... landing safely in Pike's pot of porridge. Mainwaring, relieved, apologises to Pike for calling him a stupid boy. However, Jones discovers that he cannot get down from the wires, and he soon suffers a non-fatal electric shock.

== Cast ==
- Arthur Lowe as Captain Mainwaring
- John Le Mesurier as Sergeant Wilson
- Clive Dunn as Lance Corporal Jones
- John Laurie as Private Frazer
- Arnold Ridley as Private Godfrey
- Ian Lavender as Private Pike
- Bill Pertwee as Chief ARP Warden Hodges
- Frank Williams as The Vicar
- Edward Sinclair as The Verger
- Ronnie Brody as the GPO Man
- Robert Mill as the Army Captain
- Kenneth MacDonald as the Army Sergeant
- Felix Bowness as the Van Driver
- Colin Bean as Private Sponge
- Stuart McGugan as the Scottish Sergeant
- Bernice Adams as the ATS Girl

== Production ==
=== Casting ===
This episode features three actors who were regulars on Jimmy Perry and David Croft's other sitcoms. In It Ain't Half Hot Mum, Kenneth MacDonald and Stuart McGugan played Gunner "Nobby" Clark and Gunner "Atlas" Mackintosh respectively, from 1974-1981. Felix Bowness, who appeared in this episode as the Van Driver, was a regular of Hi-de-Hi!, and played Fred Quilley from 1980-1988.

Jim Dowdall and Derek Ware performed the stunts for this episode.

=== Filming ===
The studio sequences for this episode were recorded on 15 July 1977 at the BBC Television Centre in London. Outdoor film sequences were shot at the Black Rabbit Warren in the Stanford Training Area in Norfolk, and at Sapiston Green in the Suffolk village of Sapiston.
