= Is There Honey Still for Tea? =

- Dad's Army episode
- Episode no.: Series 8 Episode 3
- Directed by: David Croft
- Story by: Jimmy Perry and David Croft
- Original air date: 19 September 1975
- Running time: 30 minutes

Episode chronology
← Previous "When You've Got to Go"	Next → "Come In, Your Time Is Up"

"Is There Honey Still for Tea?" is the third episode of the eighth series of the British sitcom Dad's Army, which was originally transmitted on Friday 19 September 1975. The title is taken from the concluding lines of Rupert Brooke's 1912 poem, The Old Vicarage, Grantchester:

Stands the Church clock at ten to three?
And is there honey still for tea?

== Synopsis ==
Private Godfrey's Cherry Tree Cottage is set to be knocked down for a new aerodrome to be built. Captain Mainwaring must find the right way to bring him the bad news.

== Plot ==
It is three months since Swallows Bank was bombed and Captain Mainwaring is keenly anticipating the arrival of his new office door (the last having been destroyed by bomb damage). He is disappointed, however, to discover the replacement is made out of paper. Various misfortunes occur to it, leaving the door in ruins in a matter of minutes.

The Colonel arrives and informs Mainwaring that Private Godfrey's cottage is to be demolished to make way for a new aerodrome. Mainwaring summons Jones and Frazer to the bank and tries to work out how best to break the news to Godfrey. Mainwaring resolves to go and inform Godfrey personally. He, Pike and Wilson walk out to pay a call to Cherry Tree Cottage, only to be invited to stay for tea. During the visit Mainwaring repeatedly puts off telling Godfrey, and finally tries to shift the responsibility and make Wilson tell him, a job which Wilson shirks. The three of them depart the cottage with Godfrey seemingly none the wiser about his home's impending fate.

Mainwaring tries to persuade Jones and Frazer to do the deed as the two oldest members of the platoon. Frazer abandons Jones, leaving him to tell Godfrey alone. Slightly awkwardly, Jones begins a rambling and convoluted explanation – only to find that Godfrey already knows, having received official notification several days before. He innocuously mentions that he meant to tell Mainwaring, but he did not want to "upset him". Jones offers to let Godfrey stay with him, which he accepts.

Later, Frazer makes a call to the home of the government minister in charge of building the new aerodrome, Sir Charles Renfrew McAllister, in the middle of the night, and threatens him with exposure for his youthful transgressions if he does not reconsider the scheme.

The next day, the platoon helps to load the furniture into ARP Warden Hodges' van as he prepares to move out, with a melancholic Godfrey and his sisters watching their possessions being carried away. However, Frazer arrives, bearing news of the official decision to shift the aerodrome several hundred yards, meaning that Godfrey's cottage will now be on the edge of it rather than in the middle. The platoon responds with delight, leaving Hodges annoyed at losing out on the fee for use of his van.

The episode ends with a tea party at Godfrey's cottage, in which he thanks Mainwaring for saving his house, unaware that it was in fact Frazer who was responsible. Suddenly, the tea party, which is being held on the lawn of the cottage, is interrupted by a plane taking off from the aerodrome, blowing everyone and everything around the garden.

== Notes ==
- In this episode, Pike refers to two films: The Ghost Goes West (1935), in which an American millionaire transports a castle from Scotland to California, and Dangerous Moonlight (1941) about the life and romance of an anti-Nazi Polish pilot, who is also a concert pianist, and fights in the Battle of Britain. John Laurie appeared in the latter film.
- According to dialogue spoken by Mainwaring at the beginning of the episode, it has been three months since the bombing of Swallows Bank (Series 5 Episode 7 ‘The King Was In His Counting House’, some 22 episodes previous).

== Cast ==
- Arthur Lowe as Captain Mainwaring
- John Le Mesurier as Sergeant Wilson
- Clive Dunn as Lance Corporal Jones
- John Laurie as Private Frazer
- Arnold Ridley as Private Godfrey
- Ian Lavender as Private Pike
- Bill Pertwee as ARP Warden Hodges
- Gordon Peters as The man with the door
- Robert Raglan as The Colonel
- Campbell Singer as Sir Charles McAllister
- Joan Cooper as Dolly
- Kathleen Saintsbury as Cissy
