= High Finance =

High Finance may refer to:

- High Finance (Dad's Army), a 1975 episode of the British comedy series Dad's Army
- High Finance (game show), a 1956 American quiz show
- High Finance (film), a 1933 British drama film
