= Come In, Your Time Is Up =

- Dad's Army episode
- Episode no.: Series 8 Episode 4
- Directed by: David Croft
- Story by: Jimmy Perry and David Croft
- Original air date: 26 September 1975
- Running time: 31 minutes

Episode chronology
← Previous "Is There Honey Still for Tea?"	Next → "High Finance"

"Come In, Your Time is Up" is the fourth episode of the eighth series of the British situation comedy Dad's Army. It was originally broadcast on Friday, 26 September 1975.

== Synopsis ==
While out camping, the platoon discover a German aircrew in an inflatable dinghy on a lake.

== Plot ==
Because of a double-booking, the platoon are forced to use the Vicar's garden for a parade. However, Mainwaring's attempts to give them a serious lecture on fieldcraft are interrupted by the persistent concerns of Mr Blewitt. As Mainwaring tries to demonstrate the use of the platoons new bivouac tents, and the best way to eat a hedgehog, Mr Blewitt objects to their "improper" use of the garden and repeatedly reports them to the irritated Vicar. The scene ends with Pike almost accidentally setting fire to the lawn and getting drenched with water by Mr Blewitt.

The following weekend the platoon are in the countryside to try out their bivouac tents. They also make rabbit stew for dinner due to the lack of any hedgehogs in the area. To Mainwaring's annoyance, Warden Hodges' van appears as he has brought out the Vicar, Verger and the Sea Scouts for a camp of their own. This will interfere with the platoon's male bonding, as "comrades under the stars", and Mainwaring suspects Hodges has brought them to that specific spot to deliberately upset him. The joke is on Hodges, however, when he finds he has run out of petrol and is forced to spend the night out there as well.

During the night, a Nazi plane appears overhead on fire, and the men get up with their rifles. However, there is nothing they can do about it, and go back to bed. The following morning, they spot three Nazi pilots floating on a rubber dinghy in the middle of the nearby lake, clearly having bailed out of the plane the previous night. Requisitioning the Sea Scouts' raft, Mainwaring and his men go out to parley with the pilots, using Hodges as an interpreter because of his knowledge of German. Pike suggests they shoot through the dinghy and sink them, but his Captain reminds him about "being a sporting nation and playing with a straight bat". Their efforts meet ridicule as the Germans, despite rising their hands, do not surrender and instead laugh when Hodges falls in the water while trying to tie a rope to their dinghy. It appears the Germans are waiting for nightfall so they can slip ashore and escape.

Knowing that they cannot shoot men with their hands up, the platoon come up with an elaborate plan involving Jones swimming underwater and bursting the dinghy with his bayonet. With predictably disastrous results, the plan goes wrong, and Hodges once again ends up in the water. This time he is taken prisoner by the Germans, who then proceed to open fire on the Scouts' boat. An angry Mainwaring draws his revolver and orders his own men to "Let 'em have it men!", but Wilson points out they will hit Hodges.

Pike comes to the rescue, using a bow borrowed from the Scouts to fire a number of arrows into the dinghy, causing it to start sinking. At last the Germans, realising the game is up, try to surrender. Mainwaring shouts out to Hodges to "ask the Germans if they can swim" to which Hodges replies "I don't care about them! I'm the one who can't swim!"

== Cast ==
- Arthur Lowe as Captain Mainwaring
- John Le Mesurier as Sergeant Wilson
- Clive Dunn as Lance Corporal Jones
- John Laurie as Private Frazer
- Arnold Ridley as Private Godfrey
- Ian Lavender as Private Pike
- Bill Pertwee as ARP Warden Hodges
- Frank Williams as The Vicar
- Edward Sinclair as The Verger
- Harold Bennett as Mr. Blewitt
- Colin Bean as Private Sponge

== Notes ==
1. The runtime of this episode is 31 minutes.
