= Kathleen Saintsbury =

British actress (1899–1995)

Kathleen Saintsbury (4 July 1899 – 1995) was a British actress from the 1920s to the 1970s but who is best known today for playing Cissy Godfrey in the BBC comedy Dad's Army.

== Early life ==
Saintsbury was born in London in 1899, the younger daughter of the actor H.A. Saintsbury (also a playwright under the name Jay Nibb) and his Irish wife, Florence. According to the 1911 census, her parents were married in 1893, but there is no record of a marriage in England. Saintsbury's older sister, Dorothie Helen (known as Helen) was also an actress. Helen married first the actor Edgar Norfolk and, after a divorce, Captain Buckley Rutherford, a son of Sir Ernest Rutherford (a wine importer, not the physicist Ernest Rutherford, although they were both born in 1871 and are sometimes confused). The marriage to Rutherford took place in 1932; four months later Rutherford shot himself. Distraught, less than a month after Rutherford's suicide, Helen also shot herself. There is some suggestion that Helen was married three times, but it is possible this reflects that her first husband was originally called Edgar Greenwood, and changed his name to Norfolk for the stage.

== Stage work ==
Early in her career, Saintsbury appeared in stage productions:

- Ivor Novello and Constance Collier's The Rat at the Grand Opera House, Belfast, Theatre Royal, Bath and Lyceum Theatre, Newport, 1925
- Robert Buchanan and Charles Marlowe's The Strange Adventures of Miss Brown, Palace Theatre, Fleetwood, 1928
- F. Brooke Warren's The Face at the Window, Little Theatre in the Adelphi, London, 1929
- The Crimes of Burke and Hare, New Theatre, London, 1931
- Uncle Tom's Cabin (a Tom show), The Brixton Theatre, 1931

== Film and television ==
Saintsbury's subsequent television work included:

- Eric Fawcett's adaptation of Dickens' A Christmas Carol (1950) as Mrs Cratchit, along with Bransby Williams as Scrooge and John Ruddock as Cratchit
- Leopold Lewis' The Bells (1950), a translation of Erckmann-Chatrian's play Le Juif polonaise
- Andrew Osborn's adaptation of Georges Simenon's novel Maigret's Mistake, Maigret: The Mistake (1960)
- Alan Bridges' adaptation of August Strindberg's play The Father (1963) for BBC television
- Andrew Osborn's adaptation of Georges Simenon's novel L’affaire Saint-Fiacre, Maigret: The Countess (1962)
- The pilot of a sitcom set in 1910 by David Climie and based on a story by W.W. Jacobs, Sam The Samaritan (1965), but which was not then commissioned
- The Long House (1965)
- Jack Bond's Separation (1968)
- Ben Travers' Rookery Nook (1970) along with Richard Briers, Arthur Lowe and Joan Cooper

Saintsbury is best-known for her appearance in an episode of Dad's Army. Nan Braunton had previously appeared as Cissy Godfrey, one of Private Godfrey's two sisters. Saintsbury appeared in place of Braunton in 1975, in episode 3 of series 8, Is There Honey Still for Tea?

== Personal life ==
Saintsbury died in 1995, aged 95. She was unmarried.
