= To Town with Terry =

BBC radio programme

To Town with Terry was a 1950s radio programme, broadcast on the BBC Home Service and hosted by Terry-Thomas.

The first episodes of series was broadcast on 12 October 1948 and subsequently ran weekly for 24 episodes until 28 March 1949. Terry-Thomas was unhappy with the series, saying "I was never totally satisfied with [it] ... The perfectionist in me always made me aware of anything that was less than first class".

The programme consisted of a "mixture of sketches, solo routines, musical interludes and a range of popular and topical star guests",

== Bibliography ==
- McCann, Graham (2009). Bounder! The Biography of Terry-Thomas. London: Aurum Press. ISBN 978-1-84513-441-9.
- Ross, Robert (2002). The Complete Terry-Thomas. London: Reynolds & Hearn. ISBN 978-1-903111-29-1.
- Terry-Thomas; Daum, Terry (1990). Terry-Thomas Tells Tales. London: Robson Books. ISBN 978-0-86051-662-0.
