= Rookery Nook (1970 TV drama) =

- Based on: Rookery Nook by Ben Travers
- Screenplay by: Ben Travers
- Starring: Richard Briers; Arthur Lowe
- Country of origin: England
- Original language: English

Production
- Producer: Eric Fawcett

Original release
- Network: BBC
- Release: 19 September 1970

Rookery Nook is a 1970 British television production by the BBC.

== Sources ==
The BBC's production was based on the play Rookery Nook, one of the Aldwych farces, by Ben Travers.

== First showing ==
First transmitted by the BBC on 19 September 1970, it was made in colour on videotape but survives only as a monochrome telerecording.

== Revival ==
The BBC's film was revived in 1994 by the National Film Theatre, the UK's leading revival house.

== Cast ==
- Richard Briers ... Gerald Popkiss
- Arthur Lowe ... Harold Twine
- Joan Cooper ... Gertrude Twine
- Irene Handl ... Mrs. Leverett
- Elizabeth Knight ... Rhoda Marley
- Moray Watson ... Clive Popkiss
- Francis de Wolff ... Putz
- Geoffrey Lumsden ... Admiral Juddy
- Mary Millar ... Poppy Dickie
- Jenny McCracken ... Clara Popkiss
- Kathleen Saintsbury ... Mrs. Possett
