= The Miser's Hoard =

- Dad's Army episode
- Episode no.: Series 9 Episode 4
- Directed by: Bob Spiers
- Story by: Jimmy Perry and David Croft
- Original air date: 23 October 1977
- Running time: 30 minutes

Episode chronology
← Previous "Knights of Madness"	Next → "Number Engaged"

"The Miser's Hoard" is the fourth episode of the ninth and final series of the British comedy series Dad's Army. It was originally transmitted on 23 October 1977.

== Synopsis ==
When Frazer is revealed to have a secret stash of gold sovereigns, Mainwaring believes he must hand them over for safe keeping.

== Plot ==
In his workshop, Frazer gleefully counts up his profits for the week as he plans to use most of it to invest in more gold sovereigns, many of which he keeps in a box. Doctor McCeavedy unexpectedly drops in to inform Frazer that one of his patients will soon need Frazer's services (i.e. he has died), and accidentally knocks over the box, revealing Frazer's secret stash.

McCeavedy informs Mainwaring of Frazer's hoard at the bank the next day, worried that any theft or loss of the gold would have devastating effects on Frazer's health. Mainwaring agrees that Frazer should not keep the sovereigns in his house and resolves to convince the stingy Scotsman to sell them and buy an annuity at the bank, furiously denouncing Wilson's suggestion that Mainwaring is motivated by the fact that he, as bank manager, would profit from this. Deciding to raise the matter subtly, Mainwaring gives the whole platoon a lecture about how they should keep their money and valuables in the bank, again insisting that any profit for him is not part of the issue. Unfortunately, Frazer sees through Mainwaring's hints and confronts him in the office, stating that he will not trust anyone, least of all Mainwaring, anywhere near his gold.

Word of Frazer's hidden wealth soon spreads and is discussed at length in Warden Hodges' grocer shop by Hodges, the Vicar (who wants to persuade Frazer to donate towards restoring the church), and the Verger. Frazer then misses parade, prompting the platoon to go looking for him; as this involves going to several pubs, Wilson ends up severely drunk. After they come back unsuccessful, Frazer defiantly phones Mainwaring, saying he will hide the sovereigns where nobody will ever find them. Inspired by Pike remembering a film about a miser who buried his gold, Mainwaring assigns some of the platoon to stake out Frazer's house, certain he will do it that night. Much later, Frazer is spotted leaving his house by both the platoon and Hodges, who is out on air raid patrol. Followed secretly by the platoon, Frazer buries the box in the local graveyard. After he leaves, Mainwaring and the others dig up the box and attempt to break it open, only to be caught by the Vicar, the Verger and Hodges, who also followed Frazer. Mainwaring decides to settle the matter the next day.

At the Home Guard parade the next day, Mainwaring convinces Frazer to give him the key to the box, lecturing him that the ease with which they found the box proves that Frazer is better off entrusting his sovereigns to the bank, although Mainwaring also reluctantly agrees to let the Vicar take a small donation. When Mainwaring unlocks the box though, it turns out to contain a brick, revealing that Frazer hid his hoard elsewhere. Frazer mockingly suggests that the Vicar accept the brick as a donation and runs from the room, vowing to the last that no one will ever get his gold.

== Cast ==
- Arthur Lowe as Captain Mainwaring
- John Le Mesurier as Sergeant Wilson
- Clive Dunn as Lance Corporal Jones
- John Laurie as Private Frazer
- Arnold Ridley as Private Godfrey
- Ian Lavender as Private Pike
- Fulton Mackay as Doctor McCeavedy
- Bill Pertwee as ARP Warden Hodges
- Frank Williams as The Vicar
- Edward Sinclair as The Verger
- Colin Bean as Private Sponge
