= Terry-Thomas =

English actor and comedian (1911–1990)

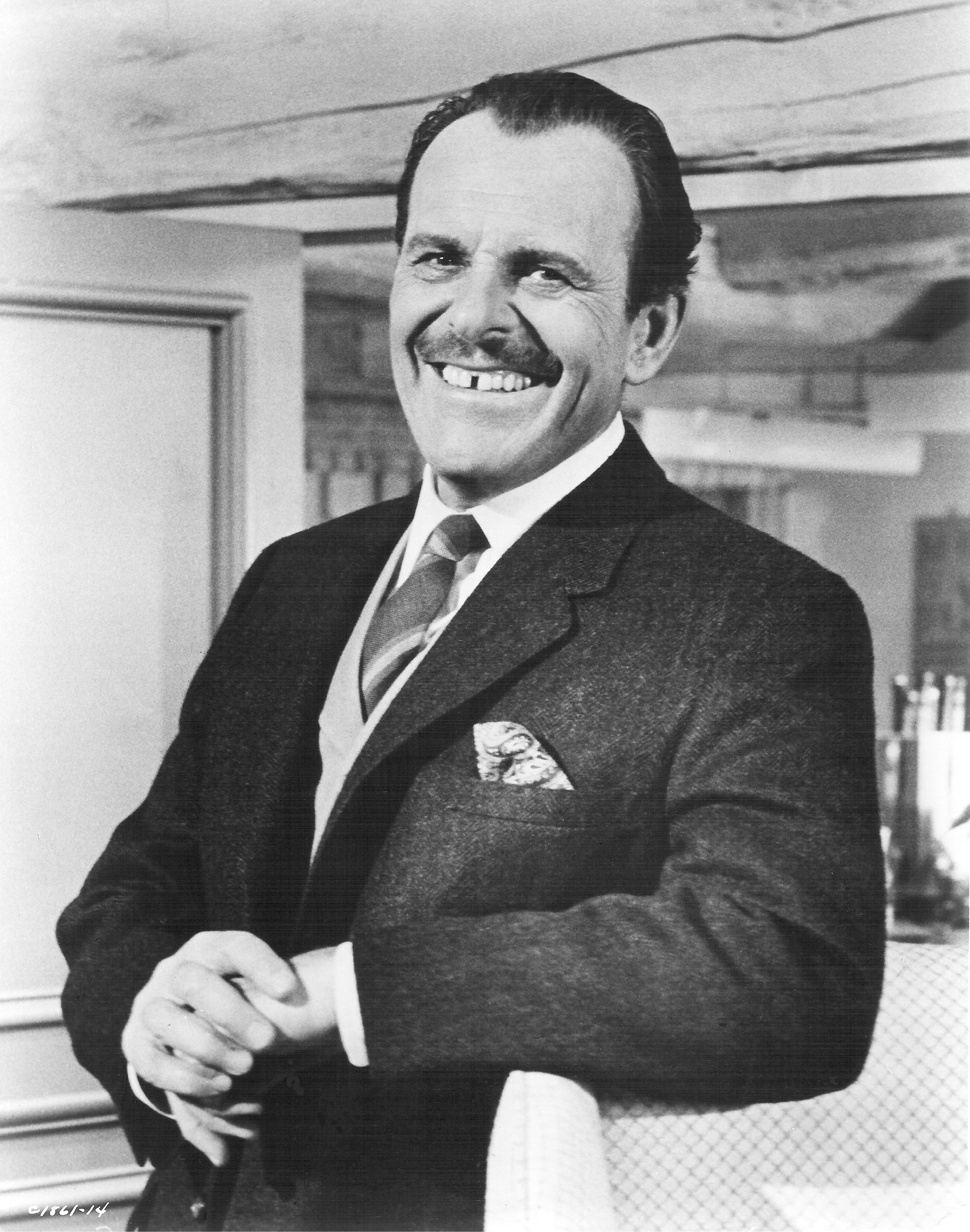
Terry-Thomas in Where Were You When the Lights Went Out? (1968)

Terry-Thomas (born Thomas Terry Hoar Stevens; 10 July 1911 – 8 January 1990) (Note: A number of sources—including Terry-Thomas's two autobiographies—show the date of birth as 14 July 1911. Terry-Thomas's biographer, Graham McCann, notes that the date on the birth certificate is 10 July.) was an English character actor and comedian who became internationally known through his films during the 1950s and 1960s. He often portrayed disreputable members of the upper classes, especially cads, toffs and bounders, using his distinctive voice; his costume and props tended to include a monocle, waistcoat and cigarette holder. His striking dress sense was set off by a 1/3-inch (8.5 mm) gap between his two upper front teeth.

Born in London, Terry-Thomas made his film debut, uncredited, in The Private Life of Henry VIII (1933). He spent several years appearing in smaller roles, before wartime service with Entertainments National Service Association (ENSA) and Stars in Battledress. The experience helped sharpen his cabaret and revue act, increased his public profile and proved instrumental in the development of his successful comic stage routine. On his demobilisation, he starred in Piccadilly Hayride on the London stage and was the star of the first comedy series on British television, How Do You View? (1949). He appeared on various BBC Radio shows, and made a successful transition into British films. His most creative period was the 1950s when he appeared in Private's Progress (1956), The Green Man (1956), Blue Murder at St Trinian's (1957), I'm All Right Jack (1959) and Carlton-Browne of the F.O. (1959).

From the early 1960s Terry-Thomas began appearing in American films, coarsening his already unsubtle screen character in films such as Bachelor Flat (1962), It's a Mad, Mad, Mad, Mad World (1963) and How to Murder Your Wife (1965). From the mid-1960s on he also frequently starred in European films, in roles such as Sir Reginald in the successful French film La Grande Vadrouille.

In 1971 Terry-Thomas was diagnosed with Parkinson's disease, which slowly brought his career to a conclusion; his last film role was in 1980. He spent much of his fortune on medical treatment and, shortly before his death, was living in poverty, existing on charity from the Actors' Benevolent Fund. In 1989 a charity gala was held in his honour, which raised sufficient funds for him to spend the final months of his life in a nursing home.

== Biography ==
=== Early life: 1911–1933 ===
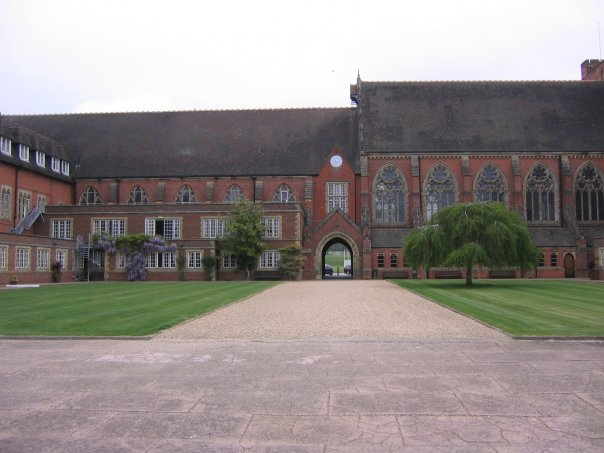
Ardingly College, where Terry-Thomas engaged in amateur dramatics.

Terry-Thomas was born Thomas Terry Hoar Stevens at 53 Lichfield Grove, Finchley, North London. He was the fourth of five children born to Ernest Frederick Stevens, managing director of a butcher's business at Smithfield Market and part-time amateur actor, and his wife Ellen Elizabeth Stevens (née Hoar). As a child, Terry-Thomas was often referred to as Tom, the diminutive used by his family. He led a generally happy childhood, but believed his parents secretly desired a daughter in his place. By the time he reached adolescence, his parents' marriage had failed and both had become alcoholics. In an attempt to bring them together, he often entertained them by performing impromptu slapstick routines, reciting jokes and singing and dancing around the family home. The performances seldom worked, and his father became increasingly distant from his family.

In 1921 Terry-Thomas began to nurture his distinctive, well-spoken voice, reasoning that "using good speech automatically suggested that you were well-educated and made people look up to you". He used the speech of the actor Owen Nares as a basis for his own delivery. Terry-Thomas became fascinated by the stage, and regularly attended the Golders Green Hippodrome to see the latest shows. It was there that he developed an interest in fashion, and adopted the debonair dress-sense of his hero Douglas Fairbanks. Terry-Thomas attended Fernbank School in Hendon Lane, Finchley, which was a welcome escape from the stresses of his parents' break-up. When he was 13, he transferred to Ardingly College, a public school in Sussex. He excelled in Latin and geography, and briefly took up drama. The latter subject later led to his expulsion from the school, after his frequent and inappropriate use of ad lib during lessons. He also took up a position in the school jazz band, first playing the ukulele and then percussion. He also often performed comedy dance routines to the band's music.

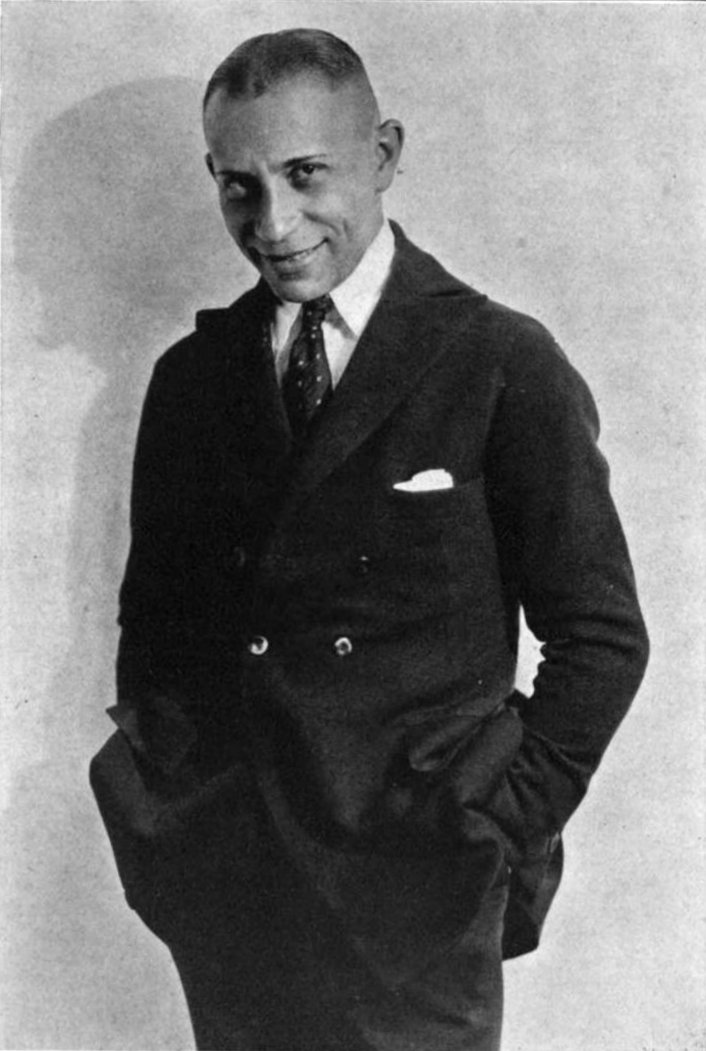
Erich von Stroheim, on whom Terry-Thomas based his early look.

Terry-Thomas enjoyed his time at Ardingly, and relished his association with upper middle class school friends. His academic abilities were modest, and he came to the notice of staff only through his frequent tomfoolery. Although he initially felt intimidated by his school surroundings, his confidence grew as he put on "a bold, undiluted and sustained show of chutzpah", according to his biographer, Graham McCann. On his return home to Finchley in 1927, his more mature manner impressed the family's housekeeper Kate Dixon, who seduced him at the family home. He stayed at Ardingly for one more term and returned home to London, but made no plans to further his education or start long-term work. Instead, he accepted a temporary position at Smithfield Market, where he earned 15 shillings a week as a junior transport clerk for the Union Cold Storage Company.

By his own admission, he never stopped "farting around" and often kept his colleagues entertained with impersonations of the Hunchback of Notre-Dame and Erich von Stroheim. He invented various characters, including Colonel Featherstonehaugh-Bumleigh and Cora Chessington-Crabbe, and frequently recited comic stories involving them to his colleagues. His characterisations soon came to the notice of the company's management who prompted him to enrol in the company's amateur drama club. He made his début with the drama company as Lord Trench in The Dover Road which was staged at the Fortune Theatre, London. The production was popular with audiences, and he subsequently became a regular performer in amateur productions.

Terry-Thomas made his professional stage début on 11 April 1930 at a social evening organised by the Union of Electric Railwaymen's Dining Club in South Kensington. He was billed as Thos Stevens, but only appeared as a minor turn. His performance brought heckles from the drunken audience, but earned him a commission of 30 shillings. After this, he played a few minor roles in Gilbert and Sullivan productions by the Edgware Operatic Society at the Scala Theatre. In 1933, he left Smithfield Market to work briefly with a friend at an electrical shop before he became a travelling salesman of electrical equipment. He enjoyed the job and relished being able to dress up in elaborate clothing in order to make his pitch. In his spare time, he began playing the ukulele with a local jazz band called the Rhythm Maniacs. He took up dancing and formed a partnership with a sister of Jessie Matthews. The act starred in local exhibitions and at minor venues, and they earned well from it. News soon travelled of the couple's talent, and they were engaged as ballroom dancers at a hall in Cricklewood. He found the dance-style too restrictive and he left the act to try other aspects of entertainment.

=== Early performances: 1933–1939 ===
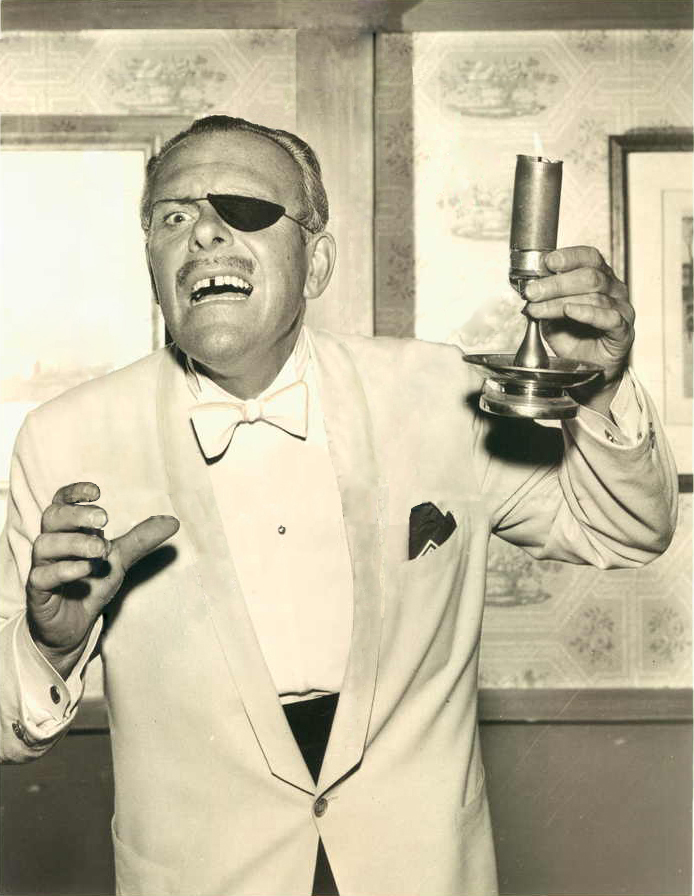
"Everyone was talking about the gap between my teeth, my monocle, the fancy waistcoats I wore and the seven-inch cigarette holders I used." —Terry-Thomas (shown in 1964) on his unique look

By 1933 Terry-Thomas had moved out of Finchley and into a friend's flat; the friend was a film extra who introduced him to the idea of working in the industry. Terry-Thomas made his uncredited film debut in the 1933 film, The Private Life of Henry VIII, which starred Charles Laughton in the title role. Between 1933 and 1941 Terry-Thomas appeared in 16 films, as an uncredited extra in all but one; (Note: The 16 films in which he appeared between 1933 and 1941 are: The Private Life of Henry VIII (1933); The Ghost Goes West (1935); It's Love Again (1936); Once in a Million (1936); Rhythm in the Air (1936); This'll Make You Whistle (1936); When Knights Were Bold (1936); Things to Come (1936); Cheer Up (1936); Rhythm Racketeer (1937); Flying Fifty-Five (1939) (his only credited role); Sam Goes Shopping (1939); Climbing High (1939); For Freedom (1940); Under Your Hat (1940) and Quiet Wedding (1941).) he later said that "this work suited me down to the ground. It wasn't really like work to me. I got an enormous kick out of it". His first speaking role came in the 1935 Buddy Rogers comedy Once in a Million where he shouted "A thousand!" during an auction. During the 1936 musical comedy This'll Make You Whistle, starring Jack Buchanan, he permanently damaged his hearing as a result of jumping into a water tank. In between his film work, he developed his cabaret act and was employed as a dance teacher at the Aida Foster School of Dancing in Golders Green.

During this period, he billed himself as Thomas (or Thos) Stevens, but rearranged the name to its backward spelling of Mot Snevets; the name did not last long and he changed it to Thomas Terry. He soon realised that people were mistaking him as a relative of Dame Ellen Terry, so inverted the name to Terry Thomas. He did not add the hyphen until 1947, and later explained that it was "not for snob reasons but to tie the two names together. They didn't mean much apart; together they made a trade name": the hyphen was also "to match the gap in his front teeth". By now, he was developing a unique sense of style both on and off stage. To avoid staining his fingers with smoke, he used a cigarette holder and later purchased "the most irresistible holder in Dunhill's. It was slightly outré because it was made of lacquered, black whangee ... with a gold band twisting neatly round it". (Note: Even after he stopped smoking in 1945 he continued to use a cigarette holder as a prop.) Adding to his look were a "monocle, raffish waistcoat and red carnation". He later wrote that "sartorially I was an eccentric. But I knew that underneath the clothes I was very much a conservative Englishman who would have loved to have been a genuine eccentric".

In 1937 Terry-Thomas met the South African dancer and choreographer Ida Florence Patlansky, who went by the stage-name Pat Patlanski, (Note: Although spelled as "Patlansky" on official documents, she used the variant "Patlanski" on all other occasions.) while she was auditioning in London for a partner for her flamenco dancing act. (Note: Ida Patlanski was born in Johannesburg, South Africa in 1903. The daughter of a hotelier, she later helped run a small dancing school before moving to London in 1937. She assumed the nickname "Pat".) Patlanski was keen to employ Terry-Thomas as a comedian rather than a dancer, and they established a cabaret double-act billed as "Terri and Patlanski", which was immediately popular with audiences. The couple became romantically involved and married on 3 February 1938 at Marylebone Register Office, afterwards moving to 29 Bronwen Court in St John's Wood. Despite the success of Terri and Patlanski, the act lasted only three months and they took on small engagements on the cabaret circuit. On 6 June 1938 Terry-Thomas made his first radio broadcast on the BBC London Regional dance programme Friends to Tea. He later recounted that "I didn't give a very good performance ... I was a dismal failure". At the end of the summer of 1938 they were hired by the bandleader Don Rico, who incorporated them into his orchestra, with Patlanski playing the piano and Terry-Thomas acting as the compère.

=== Second World War ===
I was with an ENSA party in Hereford when I received a cunningly worded, if not cordial, invitation to join the Army. I accepted with dignity, if not enthusiasm.

— Terry-Thomas on his call-up

The Entertainments National Service Association (ENSA) was formed in 1938 to provide entertainment to the British Armed Forces. (Note: The formation of ENSA was actually a re-formation, as the organisation had been active during the First World War.) Terry-Thomas and Patlanski signed up in 1939 and during the Phoney War were posted to France, where they appeared in a variety show. From early in their marriage, Patlanski had affairs, which prompted Terry-Thomas to reciprocate; he made sure he was sent on tour to France where a girlfriend was due to perform, although Patlanski accompanied him on the trip. During the tour, Terry-Thomas ensured Patlanski was sent back to Britain to enable him to continue his affair. On his return to Britain, he continued with his solo variety act, while also acting as the head of the cabaret section of ENSA at the Theatre Royal, Drury Lane, where he clashed regularly with his counterparts running the drama sections, Sir Seymour Hicks and Lilian Braithwaite. Terry-Thomas aimed to produce "good shows, sophisticated, impeccable and highly polished", which included the violinist Eugene Pini playing light classical music, and the Gainsborough Girls chorus line.

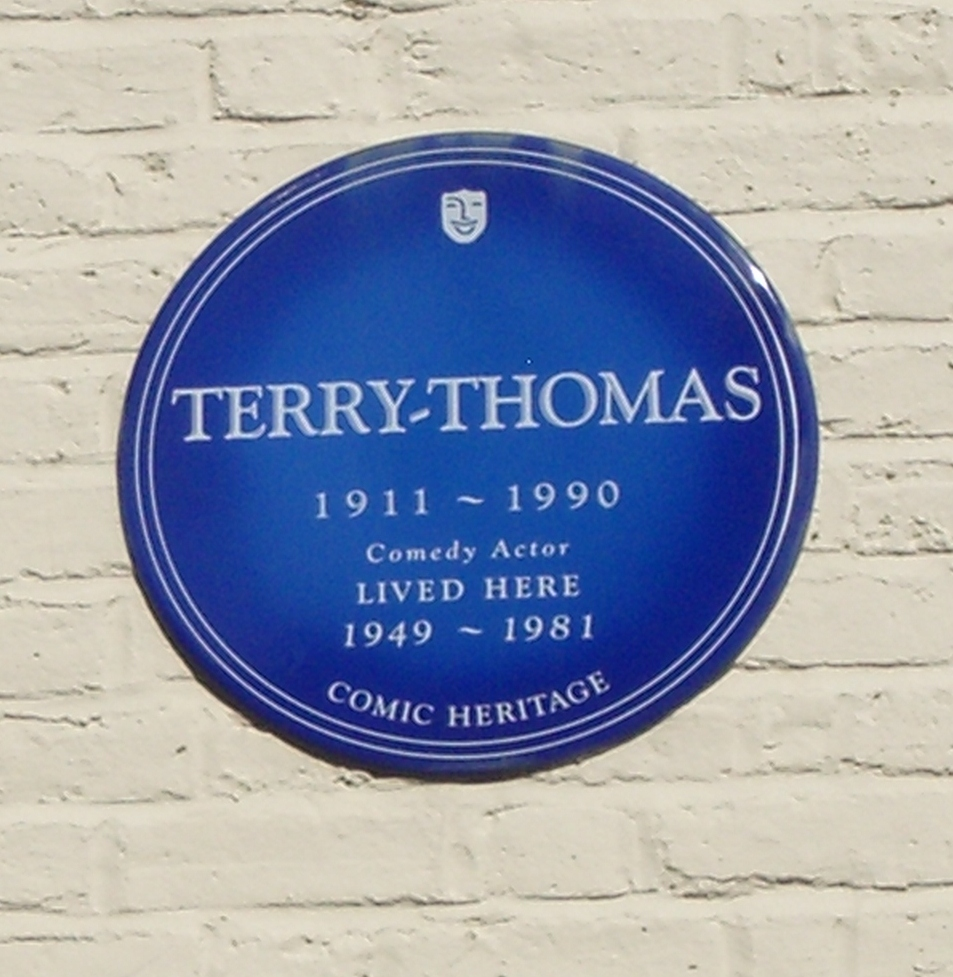
Blue plaque at Terry-Thomas's house at 11 Queens Gate Mews, Kensington

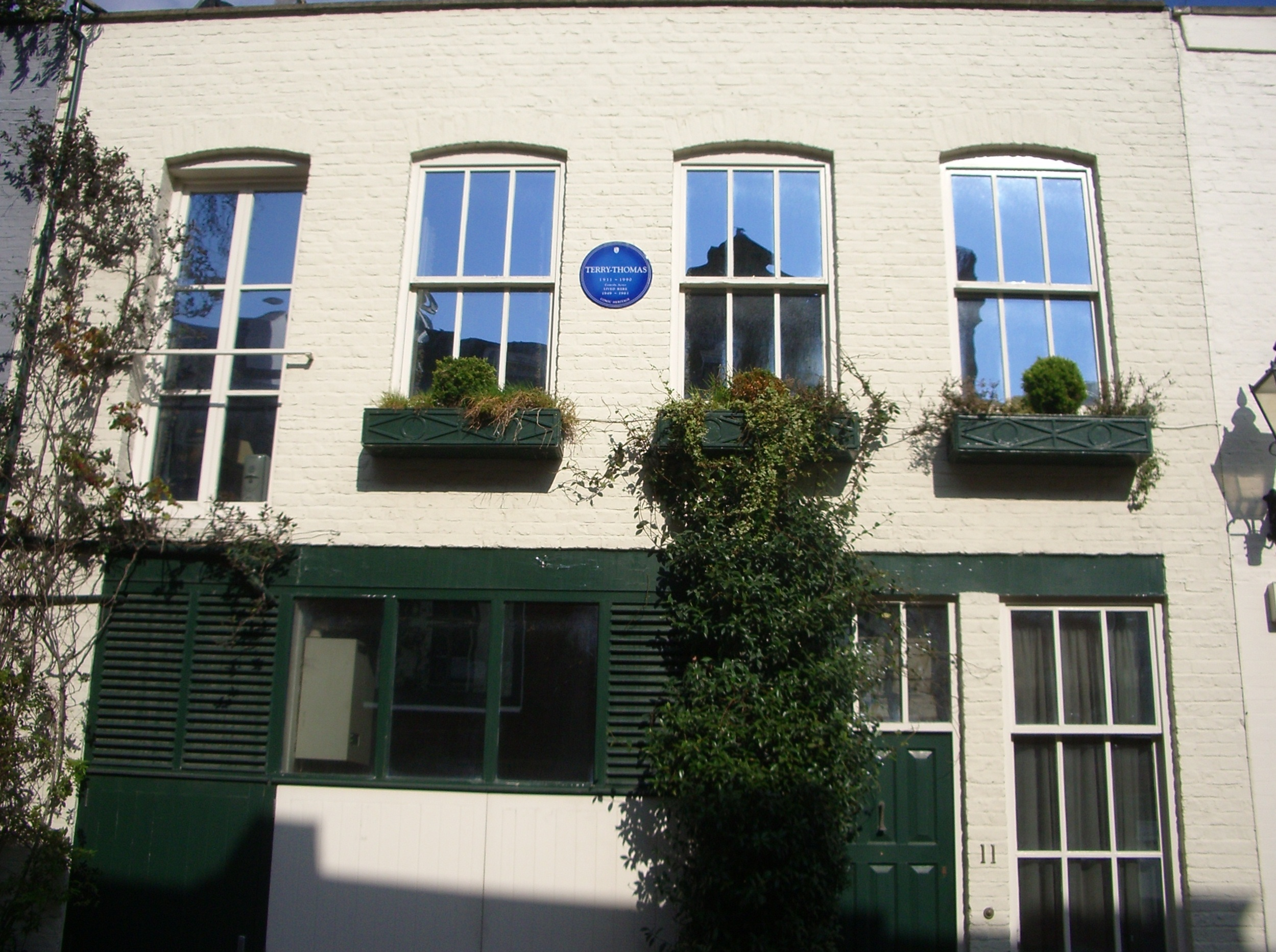
Terry-Thomas's mews house, London

In April 1942 Terry-Thomas received his call-up papers; he later wrote that "it would have seemed rather rude and ungrateful to refuse"; as a result, he left ENSA and reported to the Royal Corps of Signals training depot in Ossett, West Riding of Yorkshire. Within two weeks of his arrival he hired Ossett Town Hall and staged a concert, which included a freshly written sketch about his feet, which had been suffering in his army boots. After basic training he was promoted to the rank of corporal and applied for a commission. He was turned down because training had caused a duodenal ulcer, and his hearing was still problematic; as a result he was downgraded from A1 to B1 fitness at the start of 1943.

Terry-Thomas continued to appear in cabaret and variety shows while in the army, including at the Astoria Cinema in York, where he was seen by George Black. (Note: Black was the son of the impresario George Black Snr, who had revived the fortunes of the London Palladium and founded The Crazy Gang.) Black established the entertainment troupe, Stars in Battledress, which was composed of entertainers who were serving in the forces, and he invited Terry-Thomas to join. In February 1943 he appeared in his first Stars in Battledress show at London's Olympia, where he introduced the sketch "Technical Hitch". This involved him portraying a harassed BBC announcer introducing records that are missing. In order to cover up for the absent records he would use his vocal range of four and a half octaves to mimic the singers; he included "impersonations of Britain's clipped crooner Noël Coward, the African-American bass-baritone Paul Robeson, the Peruvian songbird Yma Sumac, the Austrian tenor Richard Tauber and ... the entire Luton Girls Choir". The show went on a national tour, with the stand-up comedian Charlie Chester as compere, during which Terry-Thomas refined and polished his act and finished as "one of the most prominent and influential members of Stars in Battledress".

Terry-Thomas, along with his Stars in Battledress unit, travelled through Britain and Europe on a tour that lasted several months. After the tour, and with his demobilisation approaching, he took compassionate leave to have free time while still receiving army pay. During his absence he went on a tour of the UK organised by George Black, accompanied on the piano by a former colonel, Harry Sutcliffe. Terry-Thomas finished the war as a sergeant, (Note: He was promoted on 4 September 1944.) and was finally demobbed on 1 April 1946.

=== Early post-war work: 1946–1955 ===
The ENSA and Stars in Battledress tours of Britain and Europe had raised Terry-Thomas's profile and, by October 1946, he was appearing alongside Sid Field in Piccadilly Hayride at the Prince of Wales Theatre, London. The show was described by Graham McCann as "the West End's biggest money-spinner for years". Terry-Thomas compered the show as well as appearing in some of the sketches, including his own "Technical Hitch" routine. In 1959 he described the effect of Piccadilly Hayride on his career, saying "This show made me overnight. I'd arrived". Ivor Brown, writing in The Observer, remarked on the "glorious rag of BBC modes, moods and intonations by Mr. Terry Thomas, a grand discovery". Within three weeks of starting his run, Terry-Thomas was invited to appear at the Royal Command Performance on 4 November 1946 at the London Palladium.

Piccadilly Hayride ran for 778 performances and ended on 17 January 1948. The show was seen by over a million people and earned £350,000 at the box office. (Note: £350,000 in 1946 equates to approximately £12,673,672 in 2025 pounds.) In conjunction with Piccadilly Hayride, Terry-Thomas undertook a number of other additional one-off appearances in cabaret and private functions. He also appeared in editions of Variety Bandbox and Workers' Playtime on BBC Radio. His ever-evolving act consisted of imitations, including that of his friend, the musician Leslie Hutchinson (known as "Hutch"); sketches, including "Technical Hitch"; urbane monologues, and "languid shaggy dog stories". At the end of his run with Piccadilly Hayride, Terry-Thomas took a three-week break to recover from nervous exhaustion and a recurrence of his peptic ulcer. He went back to cabaret and acted as a compere at the London Palladium before making his radio breakthrough on 12 October 1948 with his own series on the BBC Home Service. Consisting of a "mixture of sketches, solo routines, musical interludes and a range of popular and topical star guests", To Town with Terry was broadcast weekly and ran for 24 episodes until 28 March 1949. He was disappointed with the series, saying "I was never totally satisfied with [it] ... The perfectionist in me always made me aware of anything that was less than first class". He also appeared in his first post-war film, A Date with a Dream, in 1949, alongside his wife.

How do you view? Are you frightfully well? You are? Oh, good show!

— Terry-Thomas's opening lines on
How Do You View?

On 26 October 1949 Terry-Thomas wrote and starred in a new series on the BBC Television Service, How Do You View?, noted for being the first comedy series on British television. The programme was based around an on-screen persona of Terry-Thomas as "a glamorous, mischievous and discreetly cash-strapped man-about-town", introducing a series of sketches in which he appeared alongside Peter Butterworth as his chauffeur; Janet Brown (Butterworth's real-life wife); Avril Angers; H.C. Walton as the family retainer, Moulting; and Diana Dors. The programme was broadcast live and often included Terry-Thomas walking through control rooms and corridors of the BBC's Lime Grove and Alexandra Palace studios. The author and historian Mark Lewisohn described the series as being "inventive ... truly televisual and not just a radio programme in costume". The series ran until 21 December 1949; a second series followed between April and May 1950, with Sid Colin taking over the scripting duties and Terry-Thomas providing additional material. By the third series, which was broadcast between November 1950 and February 1951, the audience reached four million viewers. In total there were five series of How Do You View?; the final episode was broadcast on 11 June 1952. Writing about Terry-Thomas on television, Wilfred Greatorex observed that "he has ... physical attributes that make him a gift to visual entertainment: a large, rather gaunt face, pre-fabricated for close-ups; the notorious space of one-third of an inch between his two most prominent top teeth; a mouth that is full of expression. Add to these pictoral [sic] advantages his eight-inch cigarette holder and Eddie Cantor eyes".

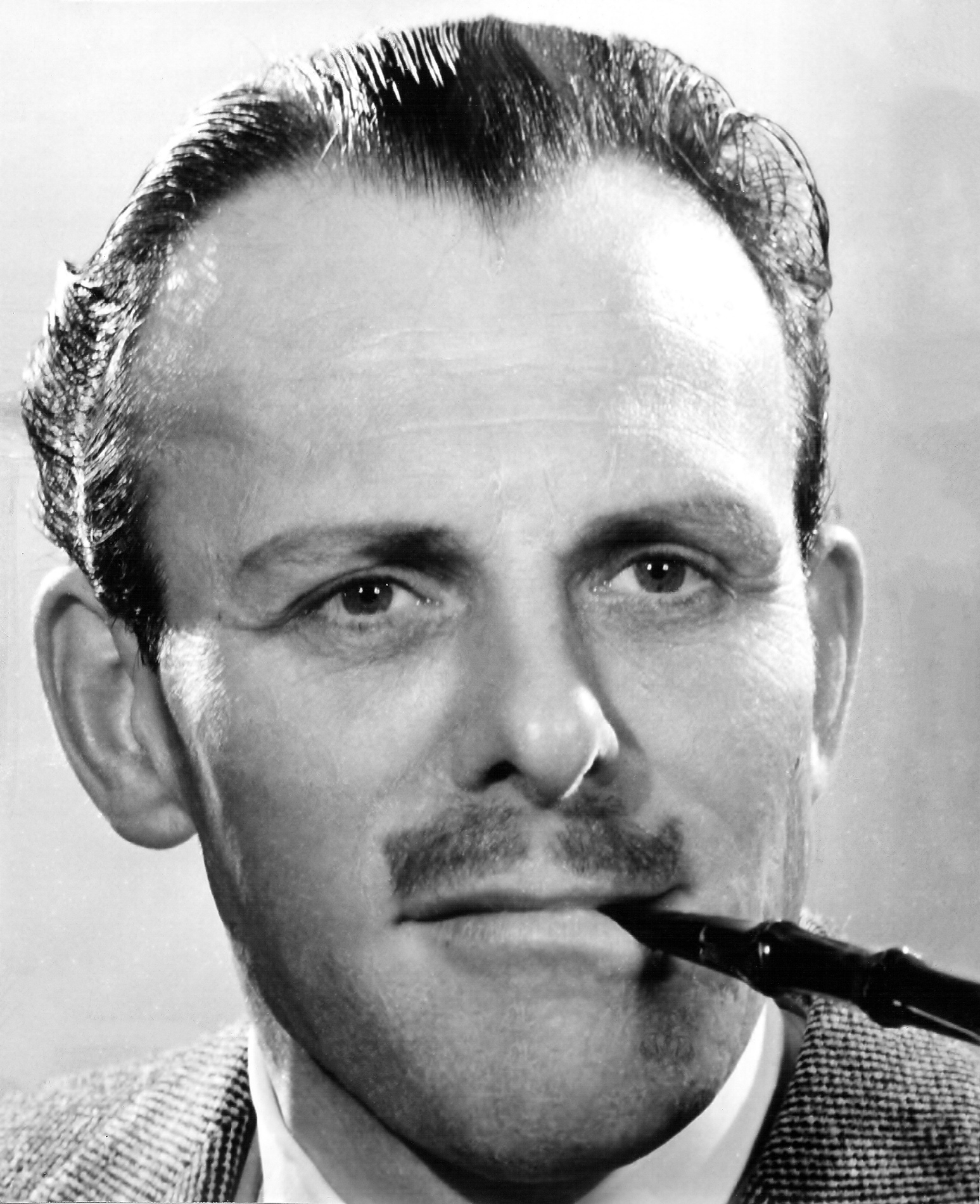
Terry-Thomas in May 1951

In between filming How Do You View?, Terry-Thomas continued performing on radio as well as in cabaret, in Britain and increasingly the US. In October and November 1949 he appeared at the Palmer House Night Club, Chicago; in June 1951 he appeared at The Wedgwood Room, Waldorf Astoria Hotel, New York, and between 22 December 1951 and 29 February 1952 he returned to the London Palladium for 109 performances in Humpty Dumpty. In September 1952 he travelled to the Federation of Malaya to entertain British troops in a series of concert parties, before returning to the UK to appear in the Royal Variety Performance in November. He finished the year in South Africa, as Honourable Idle Jack in Dick Whittington, which finished in January 1953; he considered the pantomime to be "so tatty and unrehearsed it was pathetic".

In June 1953 Terry-Thomas broadcast the pilot episode of the radio show, Top of the Town; the show was successful and the BBC commissioned a series of 16 episodes, which ran between November 1953 and February 1954. In between recording sessions, he appeared at the London Palladium in the revue Fun and the Fair, with George Formby and the Billy Cotton band, from October 1953. Fun and the Fair was unsuccessful at the box office and closed on 19 December 1953, after 138 performances. Terry-Thomas then reprised his role of Idle Jack for a run of performances in the Granada theatres of Sutton and Woolwich, and the Finsbury Park Empire, which ran to the end of January 1954. That year, he separated from Patlanski following an increase in domestic tension and the plethora of affairs in which they had both indulged. Patlanski moved out of the shared home, and the couple lived separate lives; the press did not report the separation until 1957.

Terry-Thomas spent the 1954 summer season performing at the Winter Gardens Pavilion, Blackpool before starring in a second series of Top of the Town, which ran from October 1954 to February 1955. At the end of the series he appeared as Hubert Crone in the play Room for Two, which had a UK tour prior to a run at the Prince of Wales Theatre, London. The last stop on the UK tour was at the Brighton Hippodrome, where Terry-Thomas broke his arm on stage; he returned to the show five days later when the tour reached London. He later joked that "the audience roared with laughter when I fell and made horrible faces, so much so that I considered breaking the other arm for an encore". The London run was not a success and the show closed after 48 performances.

=== British film years: 1956–1961 ===
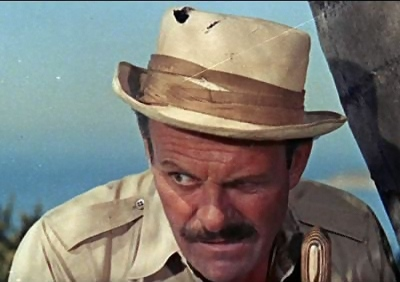
Terry-Thomas in It's a Mad, Mad, Mad, Mad World, 1963

In February 1956 Terry-Thomas appeared on Desert Island Discs, and chose two songs from his "Technical Hitch" routine as part of his selection. (Note: His full selection was George Enescu's "Ciocarlia" – Grigoraș Dinicu and his orchestra; "Getting to Know You" – Gertrude Lawrence; "St. Louis Blues" – Paul Robeson; "Cloudburst" – Don Lang; "Danse des petits cygnes" – Philharmonia Orchestra, conducted by Robert Irving; "Heidenröslein" – Richard Tauber, accompanied by Percy Kahn; Enrique Granados's "Andaluza" from Danzas españolas – Andrés Segovia; and "Zampa Overture" – London Philharmonic Orchestra, conducted by Basil Cameron. His luxury item was a saddle.) Later that year he appeared in his first major film roles: Charles Boughtflower in The Green Man, and Major Hitchcock, "a charlatan military officer on the take", in Private's Progress, directed by the Boulting brothers. Terry-Thomas appeared in the latter film only briefly, with a total screen time of about ten minutes, but his biographer Graham McCann thought the actor "came close to stealing the show from the central character", Windrush, played by Ian Carmichael. Terry-Thomas's depiction of the character was not how he wished to play it: his desired choice was that of a "silly-ass" sergeant major, but the role was written as a strict, alcohol and prescription drug-dependent Army officer. He was initially disappointed with the role, and turned it down but, after being persuaded to accept it by his agent, he embraced its possibilities. One of his lines, delivered in his clipped upper class voice, was "You're an absolute shower", which became a catchphrase for him. The Boulting brothers were so impressed with Terry-Thomas's performance that they signed him up to a five-film deal.

The first of the five films was Brothers in Law, in which Terry-Thomas played the spiv Alfred Green, a performance which was based on Sid Field's characterisation in Piccadilly Hayride. Roy Boulting later recounted that one short scene with Terry-Thomas, Richard Attenborough and Ian Carmichael took 107 takes because of Terry-Thomas's unfamiliarity with filming techniques; he initially struggled to hit his marks, or give his line and move on while still acting. Filming the scene took two days and Boulting described it as a "unique experience for him, and had a wonderful after-effect". Following Brothers in Law he was cast as Romney Carlton-Ricketts in Blue Murder at St Trinian's by producers Frank Launder and Sidney Gilliat, before again appearing for the Boulting brothers in the cameo role of a local policeman in Happy Is the Bride. Terry-Thomas starred in two further films in 1957. The first was as Bertrand Welch in Lucky Jim, an adaptation of the novel of the same name by Kingsley Amis. Although Amis thought Terry-Thomas had been "totally miscast as Bertrand, the posturing painter and leading shit" of the book, the critic for The Manchester Guardian considered Terry-Thomas as being "the nearest to a complete success" in the film, in a portrayal that "suggests possibilities for more serious roles". His final part of 1957 was Lord Henry Mayley in The Naked Truth; this brought him together with Peter Sellers for the first time; the two of them appeared frequently together over the next few years, in scenes in which Graham McCann considered that each actor's performance "highlight[ed] what was special about the other". During one scene Terry-Thomas was dumped in a near-freezing lake, and his health was affected for some time afterwards.

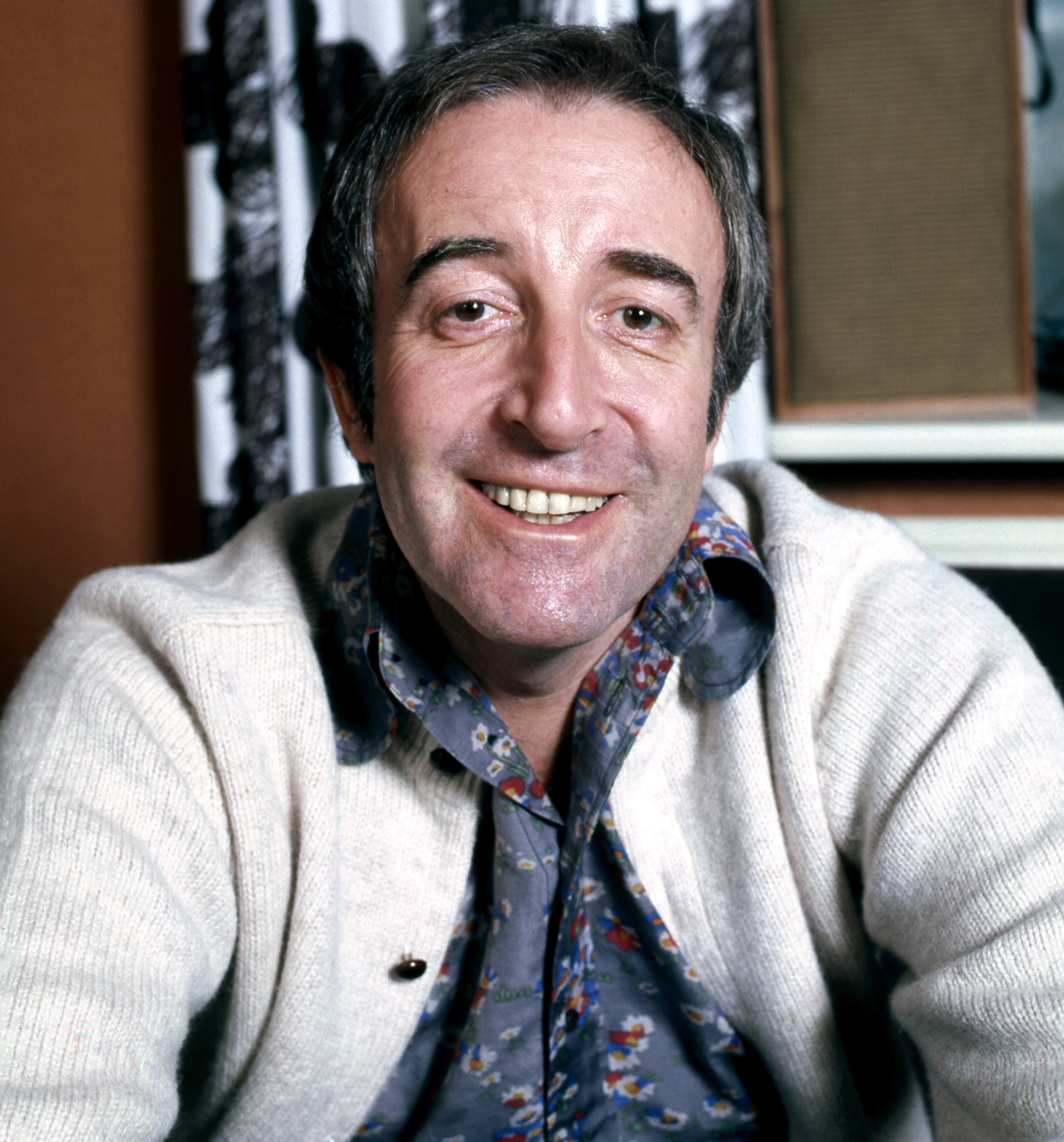
Peter Sellers, who appeared with Terry-Thomas in four films between 1957 and 1959

In 1958 Terry-Thomas received the first of his two film award nominations, the BAFTA Award for the "Best British Actor in 1959" for the part of Ivan in the Metro-Goldwyn-Mayer film tom thumb. He later described the film as his second favourite; he appeared opposite Sellers for much of his screen time, and later said that "my part was perfect, but Peter's was bloody awful. He wasn't difficult about it, but he knew it". Terry-Thomas was still suffering with poor health following the filming of The Naked Truth when he suffered an attack of lumbago; filming went on for 85 days during 1957–58, and he took painkillers to enable him to continue. The role was physically demanding, and required him to ride a horse, run long distances and fight a duel. He said he fought and ran "just as [he] had seen Douglas Fairbanks Snr do in The Mark of Zorro". Towards the end of filming, Terry-Thomas went to a Christmas party at the Trocadero, where he drank champagne (Note: One glass of Krug, 1947 vintage. He also drank two brandies and soda.) and took codeine tablets, and was subsequently arrested on suspicion of being drunk and disorderly. He considered the arresting policemen to have been rude, and "their attitude made me extremely angry and when I get angry ... I just go completely off my nut". The case came to court on 14 March 1958 and his legal team from Metro-Goldwyn-Mayer provided a medical report which showed Terry-Thomas had been on a course of prescription painkillers due to a gruelling filming schedule; along with inconsistencies in the arresting policemen's notes, the case proved inconclusive and was dismissed. For much of the rest of 1958, Terry-Thomas appeared on stage at the London Palladium in Large as Life, alongside Harry Secombe, Eric Sykes and Hattie Jacques. He played one of the Three Musketeers in one sketch and had another turn called "Filling the Gap"; the show ran for a total of 380 performances between May and December 1958. He also released his first record, Strictly T-T, a collection of comic songs and sketches.

In 1959 Terry-Thomas published his first autobiography, Filling the Gap, named after his spot in Large as Life; he explained that "everything that has been printed about me is lies. I'm not suggesting the writers were lying, I was". During the year he also appeared in two further Boultings brothers' films in their series of institutional satires, having appeared in the previous three. (Note: The series in full covered the British Army, in Private's Progress (1956); the legal system, in Brothers in Law (1957); universities, in Lucky Jim (1957); the Foreign Office, in Carlton-Browne of the F.O. (1959) and British industrial relations, in I'm All Right Jack (1959).) The first, in which he was joined again by Sellers, was Carlton-Browne of the F.O., in which he played Cadogan de Vere Carlton-Browne, a character he described as being "rubble from the nostrils up", "a certain type of Englishman, the Englishman who reads The Times and no other newspaper. A brolly carrier. A squash player. A bowler hat wearer. White collar, stiff, of course". Film writer Andrew Spicer thought Terry-Thomas's role "was the quintessential upper-class 'silly-ass', a sad relic of a vanished world". The film was initially chosen as Britain's entry for the 1959 Moscow International Film Festival until the Foreign Office petitioned the British Film Producers' Association for it to be withdrawn, considering that the Russians might consider the film to accurately portray British diplomatic behaviour.

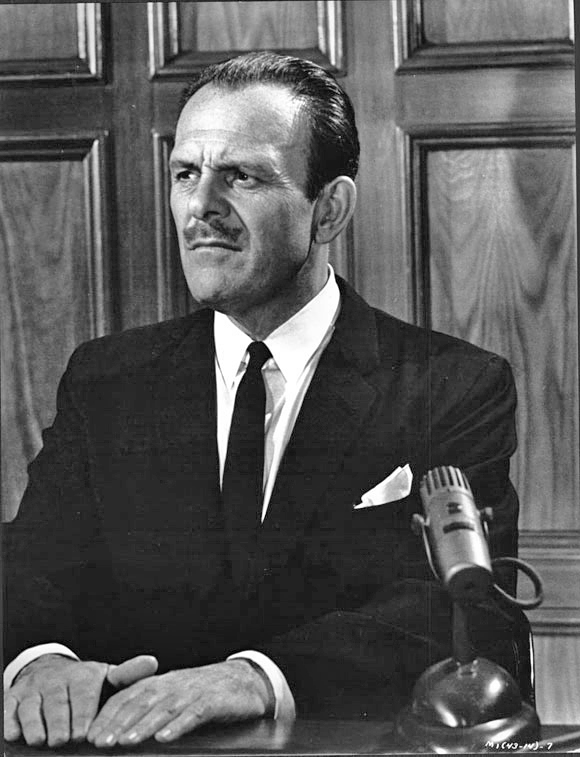
Terry-Thomas in How to Murder Your Wife, 1965—his favourite film to make

Terry-Thomas's final film with the Boulting brothers was I'm All Right Jack, a post-war follow-up to Private's Progress with Terry-Thomas reprising the role of Major Hitchcock in an industrial setting, as the "tetchily incompetent" personnel manager. Many of the other cast members of Private's Progress also returned, including Attenborough, Carmichael and Dennis Price; they were joined by Peter Sellers, who took most of the plaudits from the critics, although Stanley Kauffmann, writing in The New Republic also delighted in Terry-Thomas's "finesse" and "extraordinary skill". The Los Angeles Times retrospectively considered I'm All Right Jack and Carlton-Browne of the F.O. to have been Terry-Thomas's best works. His final film of 1959 was as William Delany Gordon in Too Many Crooks. Bosley Crowther of The New York Times thought Terry-Thomas provided "some of the fieriest conniptions to be seen on the contemporary screen", going on to say the actor's "skill is exercised in demonstrating how magnificently and completely a mad-cap comedian can completely blow his top. His eyes flash, his lips curl, his sibilants whistle and he glares like a maniac". Filming took place during the daytime; in the evenings he appeared at the London Palladium, something he found trying on his nervous system.

In 1960 Terry-Thomas appeared as Raymond Delauney in School for Scoundrels, a film his biographer, Robert Ross, called "the definitive screen presentation of his frightfully well-mannered, well-read and well-educated lounge lizard: T-T the man as T-T the film star". He again appeared opposite Ian Carmichael, and they were joined by Alastair Sim and Janette Scott. Michael Brooke, writing for the British Film Institute, thought Terry-Thomas was "outstanding as a classic British bounder". CNN listed the performance among the top ten British villains, stating, "generally found twirling his cigarette holder while charming the ladies — at least, when not swindling, cheating or behaving like an absolute rotter." Later the same year he appeared in Make Mine Mink as Major Albert Rayne, a veteran of the Second World War who forms a gang of mink coat thieves with his female co-lodgers. When he made an appearance at a screening of the film in Dalston, north-east London, he was presented with a white mink waistcoat by a local furrier.

In 1961 Terry-Thomas played Archibald Bannister in A Matter of WHO, which he described as "my first (fairly) serious role". He was joined in the film by his cousin's son Richard Briers, with Terry-Thomas noting that he provided "no nepotic help" in getting Briers the part. The film was not well received by the critics; an internal BBC memo described that in the UK the film was "murdered by the critics", although it was "something of a success" in America. By this time Terry-Thomas had decided to stop being a stand-up comedian and compere and instead concentrate solely on making films. He stopped appearing on television and radio shows of his own, declaring "it was the cinema for me and me for the cinema!" Having accumulated considerable experience by appearing in British films, he decided to try Hollywood, and moved to America.

=== Breaking into Hollywood: 1961–1965 ===
Terry-Thomas spent part of 1961 in America, filming the role of Professor Bruce Patterson in Bachelor Flat—his first Hollywood role—before flying to Gibraltar to film Operation Snatch, in which he teamed up with Lionel Jeffries. By the end of 1961 Terry-Thomas was appearing on radio, such as the December broadcast of The Bing Crosby Show and in guest spots on American television shows; he was frequently the subject of US newspaper interviews. In 1962 Bachelor Flat and Operation Snatch were both released, and were followed by two more films: a large-budget biopic from Metro-Goldwyn-Mayer called The Wonderful World of the Brothers Grimm, in which Terry-Thomas shared his scenes with the American comedian Buddy Hackett, and Kill or Cure, in which he appeared with Sykes, a friend since they worked together in Large as Life.

On 1 February 1962 Terry-Thomas and Pat Patlanski divorced, having spent the previous eight years estranged. He had by then split from his mistress of the previous few years, Lorrae Desmond, who returned to Australia shortly afterwards and married a surgeon; Terry-Thomas resumed his bachelor lifestyle. The break-up with Desmond caused him great upset, and he sought solace with Belinda Cunningham, a 21-year-old whom he had met on holiday in Mallorca two years previously. (Note: Belinda Cunningham was born in Lincolnshire in 1941 and was the daughter of Lieutenant-Colonel Geoffrey Cunningham. She was working in Mallorca when she first met Terry-Thomas and they remained in close contact when they each returned home to England. Geoffrey opposed the relationship and made many efforts to separate his daughter from the actor, including securing her a job as a personal assistant in Singapore, which she did not take.) The couple began a romance, and married in August 1963 at Halstead Registry Office near Colchester, Essex. The following year she gave birth to their first son—Timothy Hoar—at the Princess Beatrice Hospital in London. (Note: Although named Timothy at birth, he was often called Tiger by his parents.)

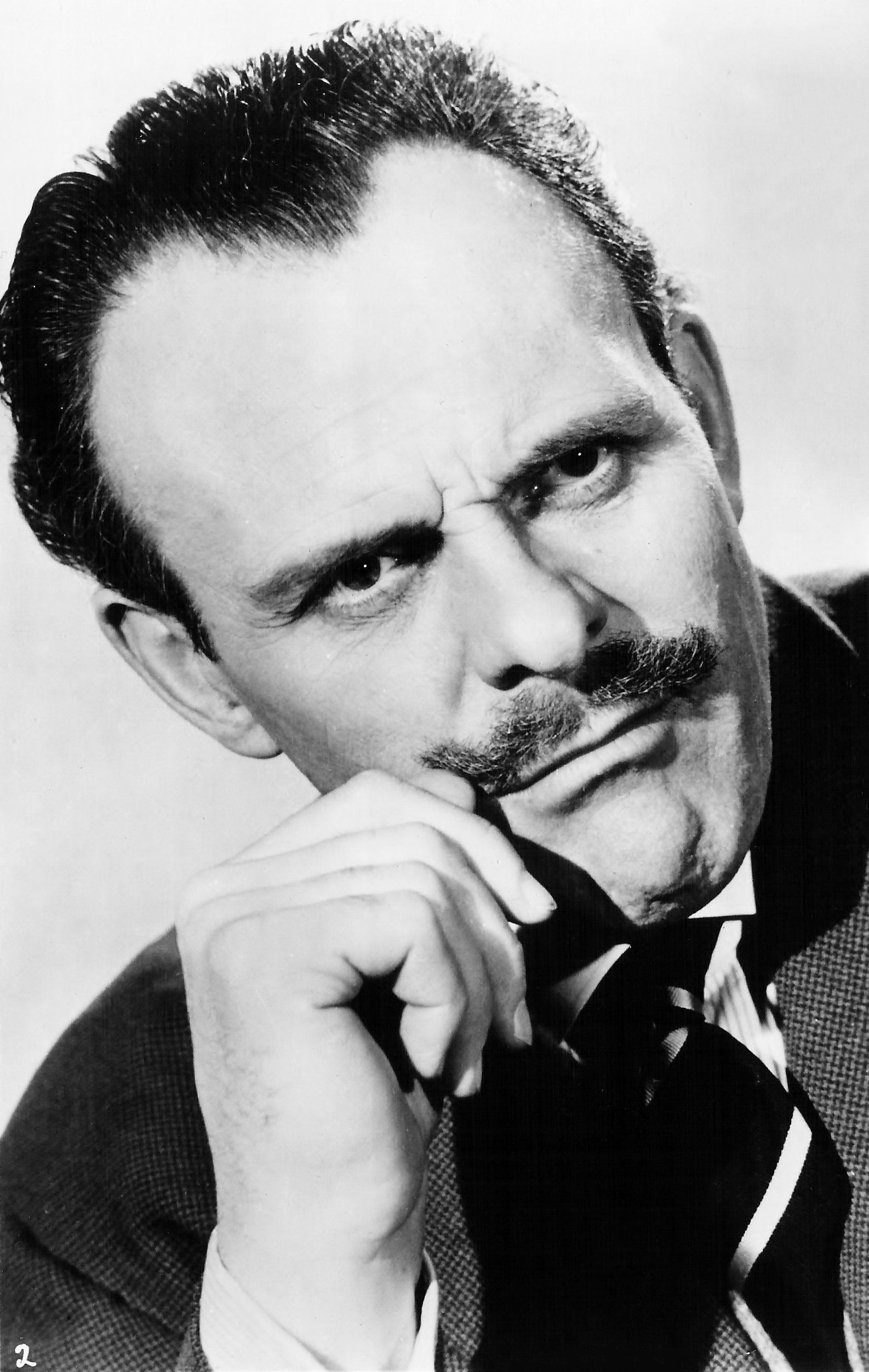
Publicity shot of Terry-Thomas for The Bing Crosby Show, 1961

In 1962 Terry-Thomas was offered the role of Lt-Colonel J. Algernon Hawthorne in It's a Mad, Mad, Mad, Mad World, and turned down the opportunity before leaving for the UK. By the time his flight arrived in London he had changed his mind, so he telephoned producer Stanley Kramer from the airport to signal his acceptance, and "popped back on a plane to be fitted for the part" the same day. He was not comfortable with many of the other actors on set, later commenting that "I was the only non-American, and I found it exhausting and embarrassing because they never relaxed. They were always 'on'." One of the American stars was Spencer Tracy, whom Terry-Thomas considered "an extra-special man"; Tracy and Buster Keaton—who also appeared in the film—were described by Terry-Thomas as "the only two people who ever produced in me this awe of greatness".

Later in 1963 he picked up his second film nomination, the Golden Globe for Best Comedy Actor for his portrayal of Spender in The Mouse on the Moon. (Note: The award eventually went to Alberto Sordi for his performance in To Bed, also known as Il diavolo.) He also tried his hand at production, with three 15-minute travelogues: Terry-Thomas in Tuscany, Terry-Thomas in the South of France and Terry-Thomas in Northern Ireland. He did not enjoy the producer's role, complaining that "for some extraordinary reason that I could never understand, everybody was always out to do the producer of any film whoever he was. I had to be on the watch the whole time". He worked consistently during 1963, appearing in television programmes on both sides of the Atlantic; these included Terry-Thomas, a one-off variety show on BBC Television in July that included Donald Sutherland. (Note: Other appearances included What's My Line? in April; The British At Play in August (both on BBC television); The Judy Garland Show on CBS; and Burke's Law on ABC (both in October).)

In 1964 Terry-Thomas started filming the role of Charles Furbank in How to Murder Your Wife, a part which brought him £100,000, (Note: Approximately £1,693,010 in 2025.) his largest fee to that point. He said it was his favourite to make, "because I felt that I did a very good job". He enjoyed working with Jack Lemmon, the film's star, partly because Lemmon would play jazz and sing while the scenes were being lit: the two became friends and Terry-Thomas was invited to Lemmon's wedding. Throughout the rest of the year Terry-Thomas continued to appear on US television, again in Burke's Law, but also on What's My Line? and An Hour with Robert Goulet, both on CBS; he also released another record, Terry-Thomas Discovers America, a collection of songs and sketches, described by Billboard as "a funny, funny comedy masterpiece". His earlier record, Strictly T-T, was also released in the US.

Alongside How to Murder Your Wife, there were two further releases for Terry-Thomas in 1965: Strange Bedfellows, in which he played the part of a mortician, and Those Magnificent Men in their Flying Machines. In the latter, he played Sir Percy Ware-Armitage, a character the film historian Andrew Spicer calls "a cartoon version" of his usual persona in a "bloated mid-Atlantic comed[y]". In the film, Terry-Thomas appeared again with Sykes, an experience Sykes later described as magical. The roles of Ware-Armitage and his sidekick were written especially for Terry-Thomas and Sykes at the behest of the director Ken Annakin.

=== European cinema: 1966–1970 ===
My work was done so quickly, I never even knew the title of the films or met the stars. Many's the time I have finished one picture on a Saturday and been flying somewhere on a Sunday to start shooting on the Monday ... Rome one week, Paris the next, Brazil the week after. It was madness.

— Terry-Thomas on his "foreign productions"

By the mid-1960s Terry-Thomas was tiring of the Hollywood lifestyle, and, during the latter half of the 1960s, he worked with European filmmakers, returning occasionally to the US when he was filming there. In one of his French-produced films, La Grande Vadrouille, he played Sir Reginald, a stranded Royal Air Force pilot travelling through occupied France with characters played by Bourvil and Louis de Funès. The film, released in 1966, held the record for highest box-office takings in France until 2004, and it remains "one of the most popular films with television audiences in France". Terry-Thomas undertook a number of roles with the Italian cinema industry. For one of the Italian-produced films, the 1967 farce Arabella, he played four parts and used "the help of wigs, moustaches and lashings of Max Factor" to help achieve the different characterisations, which were all with the Italian actress Virna Lisi. (Note: Terry-Thomas described the roles as "a neurotic hotel manager in a fuzzy black wig, pince-nez and a pale green face. A ginger-headed army general with a red face, ginger moustache and a monocle. A bland bank manager. And a blond-haired Italian count".) (Note: During the years 1966 to 1969 Terry-Thomas's European film output included: France: La Grande Vadrouille (1966); Le Mur de l'Atlantique (1969); Italy: Se Tutte le Donne del Mondo (1966); Top Crack (1967); Arabella (1967); Arriva Dorellik (1967); Danger: Diabolik (1968); Seven Times Seven (1968); Uno Scacco Tutto Matto (1968); Monte Carlo or Bust! (1969) an Italian/French/British production; Una Su Tredici (1969); Britain: The Sandwich Man (1966); Our Man in Marrakesh (1966) – a British/American production; Jules Verne's Rocket to the Moon (1967); Arthur? Arthur! (1969))

Although the European films allowed him to travel and gave him a constant source of income, he received bigger fees from his less-frequent engagements in US films, which he continued to appear in, joking that he "knew the fat cheques in the pipe-line were endless". One of the bigger fees came with Gene Kelly's 1967 film A Guide for the Married Man; he was disappointed by Kelly's direction, later saying "I found him a very prudish director, not as imaginative or experimental as I would have liked". Terry-Thomas had more time for the actress with whom he shared his short scene, Jayne Mansfield, commenting that "I found her rather intelligent to talk to and felt quite shattered when I read about the gruesome car accident that killed her". An actress he had difficulties in working with was Doris Day: in the 1968 film Where Were You When the Lights Went Out?, which was produced by her husband Martin Melcher. Day would instruct Terry-Thomas how he should act in a scene (he would "listen ... politely, then do it my own way, as if the conversation had never taken place"). She would also launch into improvisations while filming; director Hy Averback would mimic a scissor action behind her back to signal to Terry-Thomas that the material would be duly cut from the final print. The result was a film that Geoff Mayer called "limp", and Christopher Young described as "such an uneven movie that misses so many opportunities for real comedy".

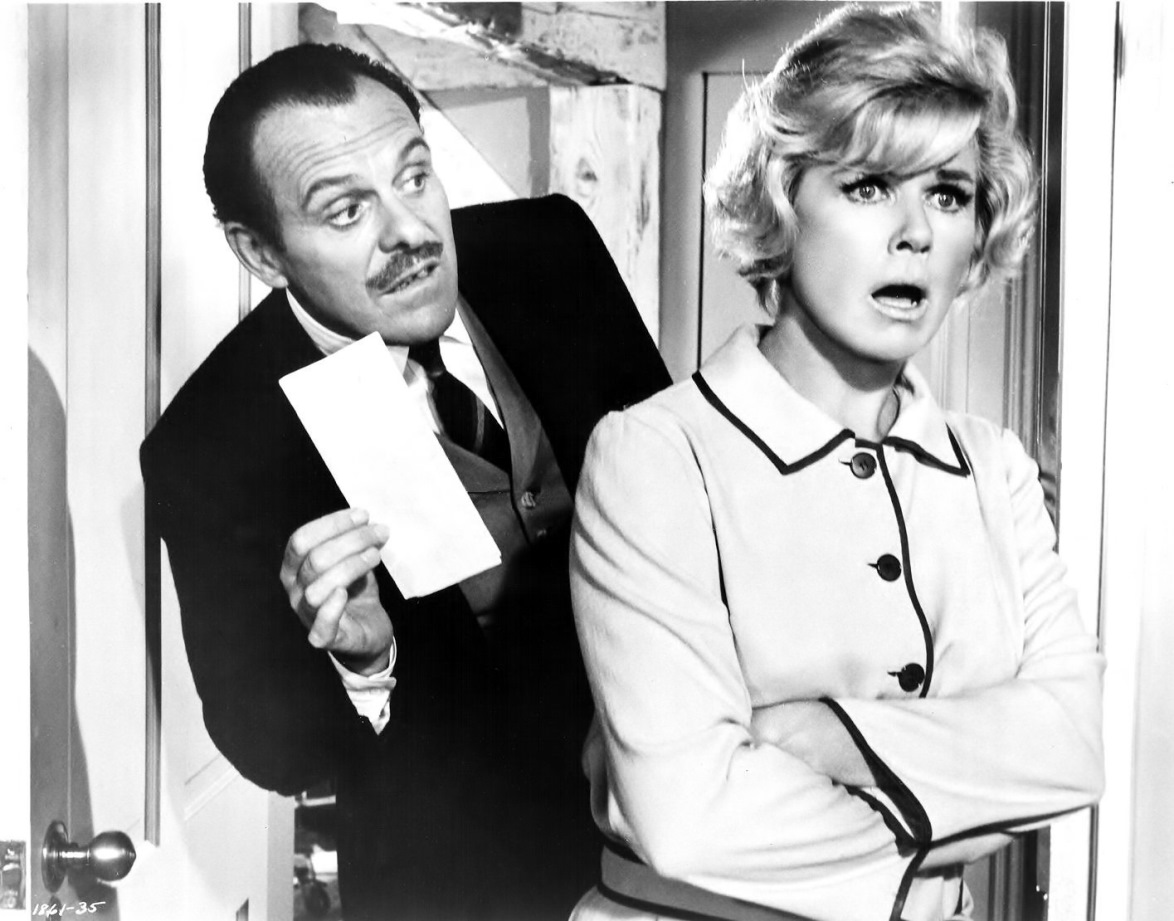
Terry-Thomas and Doris Day in Where Were You When the Lights Went Out? (1968)

In 1967 Terry-Thomas met his long-time friend Denholm Elliott in Bel Air and the pair talked about Elliott's new villa in Santa Eulària des Riu on the Spanish island of Ibiza. Terry-Thomas was intrigued by the possibility of a Mediterranean retreat and visited the island on the way to sing in the television special Monte Carlo: C'est La Rose (1968), a musical tour of Monte Carlo hosted by Princess Grace of Monaco. (Note: The programme was later broadcast on 6 March 1968 on the American ABC network.) Although he initially struggled to find the right plot of ground for the right price, he eventually settled on an appropriate location; declaring he was "allergic to architects", he designed the house himself. His former wife Pat moved to the nearby island of Mallorca, and Terry-Thomas's relationship with her became warm and friendly; Patlanski also had a firm friendship with Terry-Thomas's wife.

In between films Terry-Thomas appeared on television on both sides of the Atlantic. In the US in March–April 1967 he was in "The Five Daughters Affair", a two-part story in the TV series The Man from U.N.C.L.E., and on 22 May he appeared on The Red Skelton Hour. On British television, in an episode of the Comedy Playhouse called "The Old Campaigner", he played James Franklin-Jones, a salesman for a plastics company who was continually searching for love affairs while travelling on business. This character was "yet another variation on his rakish cad persona", according to Mark Lewisohn. The episode was well-received, and a six-part series was commissioned that ran over December 1968 and January 1969. Although the series performed well in the ratings, a second series was not commissioned. In between the pilot and the series of The Old Campaigner, in April 1968, Terry-Thomas appeared on the British ITV network in a one-off variety special, The Big Show, which combined musical numbers and his urbane monologues. Robert Ross commented that Terry-Thomas "seemed to delight in resurrecting his vintage sophisticated patter after years in movies ... the top raconteur was back where he belonged". In 1969 he again teamed up with Eric Sykes and director Ken Annakin for a joint Italian, French and British production Monte Carlo or Bust!. The film was "the only copper-bottomed sequel to ... Those Magnificent Men in their Flying Machines", according to Richard Ross. Terry-Thomas played Sir Cuthbert Ware-Armitage, the "thoroughly bad egg son of flying ace Sir Percy Ware-Armitage", his role in Those Magnificent Men. Terry-Thomas secured four other roles in minor films that year, including Arthur? Arthur! (which he joked had "never been shown anywhere—as far as I know!"), as well as on television in the UK, US and Australia. (Note: These programmes included This is Tom Jones and The Liberace Show in the UK; The Hollywood Palace and The Peapicker in Piccadilly in the US and Music Hall in Australia.)

The 1970s began well for Terry-Thomas; television appearances in the UK and US were augmented by filming for The Abominable Dr. Phibes, which became what author Bruce Hallenbeck called a "camp classic", despite being described by Time Out critic David Pirie, as "the worst horror film made in England since 1945"; the film was released in 1971. On 1 August 1970 Terry-Thomas made his second appearance on Desert Island Discs; his luxury item was a case of brandy, chosen because it lasted longer than champagne. (Note: His full selection was "Honeysuckle Rose" – Django Reinhardt and Stéphane Grappelli; "Where or When" – Hutch; "Heidenröslein" – Richard Tauber; "Spanish Dance" – Andrés Segovia; "Zampa Overture" – w. Antonio dancing; "Alice is at it Again" – Noël Coward; "A New-Fangled Tango" – Lena Horne; and a mazurka from Les Sylphides by Frédéric Chopin.)

=== Dealing with Parkinson's: 1971–1983 ===
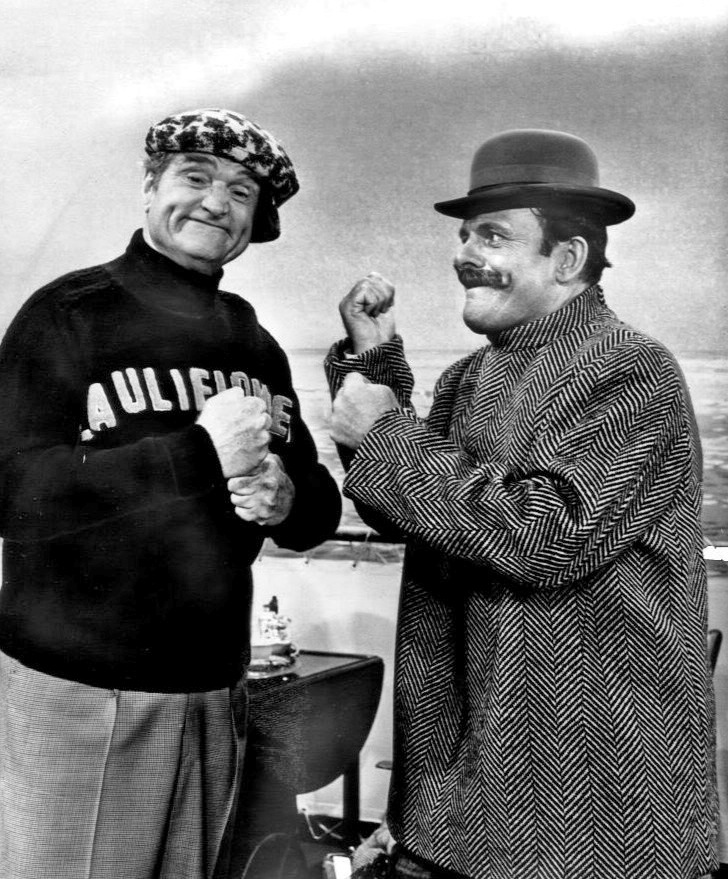
Terry-Thomas (right) and Red Skelton in The Red Skelton Show (1968)

While appearing in Don't Just Lie There, Say Something! at the Metro Theatre, Sydney in 1971, Terry-Thomas felt unwell and visited a doctor, who noticed his patient's left hand was shaking slightly. The doctor suggested he visit a specialist on his return to the UK, who diagnosed him with Parkinson's disease. Fearing the condition would affect offers of work, Terry-Thomas did not make the news public, but as the symptoms began to manifest themselves in tremors, a shuffling gait, stooped posture and affected speech, he made the news known—partly to stop rumours of on-set drunkenness.

Terry-Thomas continued to work as much as possible, although—as the film historian Geoff Mayer pointed out—the situation "reduced his film career to supporting roles and cameos". The lucrative voice-over role of Sir Hiss in the 1973 Walt Disney film Robin Hood was one notable part, while others were less well-known, such as The Vault of Horror, a film described by Richard Ross as a "cornball terror", in which he starred with Curd Jürgens, Tom Baker and Denholm Elliott. He also continued to appear on television shows in both the US and UK, as well as advertisements, including appearing with June Whitfield for Birds Eye fish fingers, a series of vermouth advertisements filmed in Italy, and an award-winning series for Benson & Hedges cigarettes, with Eric Sykes.

During the 1970s he starred in a series of low-budget British films, including two in 1975, Spanish Fly—called a "gruesome smutfest" by the writer Christopher Fowler—and The Bawdy Adventures of Tom Jones, described by the Film Review Digest as a "cheap, crude, sexed-up rehash" of the other film adaptations of Henry Fielding's source novel.

Some days it's worse than others. It's infuriating. One minute I can be behaving in a perfectly normal manner; the next I have become a shaking mass of humanity.

— Terry-Thomas describing "perfidious Parkinson's"

In 1977 he starred in The Last Remake of Beau Geste and The Hound of the Baskervilles, the latter starring Peter Cook and Dudley Moore as Holmes and Watson; Terry-Thomas thought "it was the most outrageous film I ever appeared in ... there was no magic ... it was bad!" By then he had exhibited a decrease in bodily movement, a sign of how serious his condition had become. His distinctive voice had developed a softer tone and his posture was contorted. Between 1978 and 1980, he spent much time with medical consultants. Despite this he was offered a few engagements and was voted the most recognisable Englishman among Americans in a poll which also featured Laurence Olivier, Robert Morley and Wilfrid Hyde-White. As a result, he secured a lucrative advertising contract with the Ford Motor Company. Derek Jarman offered Terry-Thomas a role in his 1979 film The Tempest, but the actor was forced to pull out because of his deteriorating health.

Terry-Thomas undertook his final film role in 1980 in Febbre a 40!, a German-Italian co-production that was "nondescript and barely screened", according to Robert Ross, and did not even have a theatrical release in its two domestic markets. He continued his involvement in the film industry, where he funded three films during the early 1980s (noted by Ross to be "destined from the outset for B-picture status or straight-to-video exposure"); he commented that "I have made a loss of one hundred per cent". In 1982, with his condition worsening, Terry-Thomas appeared in two episodes of the BBC series The Human Brain, which examined his condition; his frank interview brought much public awareness of the disease and raised £32,000 for the Parkinson's Disease Society. Privately, he was becoming more depressed; his London flat had been sold to provide badly needed funds, and his work offers were decreasing.

=== Final years and death: 1983–1990 ===
By 1983, with his medical bills at £40,000 a year and no longer able to work, Terry-Thomas's financial resources were dwindling. He and his wife sold their dream house on Ibiza and moved into the small cottage in Spain once owned by his former wife Pat Patlanski, which she left to him in her will on her death in June that year. Shortly afterwards he worked with ghostwriter Terry Daum on an autobiography, Terry-Thomas Tells Tales. Although the first draft was completed by late summer 1984, Terry-Thomas refused to release the manuscript and continued making alterations, but never completed his copyediting: the book was finally published after his death.

By 1984 Terry-Thomas was increasingly depressed by his condition and when he was interviewed that year, he admitted that "one doctor said I've got about four more years to live. God forbid! I shall probably blow my brains out first". In 1987 the couple could no longer afford to live in Spain, so moved back to London. They lived in a series of rented properties before ending up in a three-room, unfurnished charity flat, where they lived with financial assistance from the Actors' Benevolent Fund. Richard Briers was one of his first visitors at the flat, and was shocked by the change he saw: "Sitting there, motionless, he was just a mere shadow. A crippled, crushed, shadow. It was really bloody awful."

On 9 April 1989 the actor Jack Douglas and Richard Hope-Hawkins organised a benefit concert for Terry-Thomas, after discovering he was living in virtual obscurity, poverty and ill health. The gala, held at the Theatre Royal, Drury Lane, ran for five hours, and featured 120 artists with Phil Collins topping the bill and Michael Caine as the gala chairman. The show raised over £75,000 for Terry-Thomas and Parkinson's UK. The funds from the charity concert allowed Terry-Thomas to move out of his charity flat and into Busbridge Hall nursing home in Godalming, Surrey. He died there on 8 January 1990, at the age of 78. The funeral service was held at St. John the Baptist Church, Busbridge, where the theme from Those Magnificent Men in their Flying Machines was played; he was cremated at Guildford Crematorium.

== Screen persona and technique ==
Although there were exceptions, Terry-Thomas's screen characters were generally similar; Geoff Mayer wrote that "although there would be variations, he would remain the 'rotter', a pretentious, elitist, seedy, sometimes lecherous cad with an eye for quick money and the easy life". Eric Sykes, with whom Terry-Thomas shared a number of screen moments, said it was "always the same character and always funny". Andrew Spicer, writing for the British Film Institute, called him "the definitive postwar cad or rotter". Terry-Thomas himself agreed with the view he presented, writing in the 1980s that "T-T with his permanent air of caddish disdain ... bounder ... aristocratic rogue ... upper-class English twit ... genuine English eccentric ... one of the last real gentlemen ... wet, genteel Englishman ... high-bred idiot ... cheeky blighter ... camel-haired cad ... amiable buffoon ... pompous Englishman ... twentieth-century dandy ... stinker ... king of the cads ... All those descriptions added up to my image as Terry-Thomas".

What will, and what will not, make people laugh is a mystery and mine's a terrible trade. The best course is to accept it without too much analysis.

— Terry-Thomas on being a comedian

Terry-Thomas identified himself as a comedy actor, but regarded himself "first and foremost, as a comedian with a built-in ability to inject humour into situations". He worked hard at the humour element, especially during his days in cabaret and revue; he wrote that he "spent an enormous amount of time studying how to write humour and reading books on the philosophical approach to it, but it didn't get me very far. I decided that humour was like a good watch. It would go well if left to do its job but the moment one started poking around, it went wonky". While working on his television series How do you View?, he would change lines around to ensure the scene worked well, even if he gave the best lines to others; it was a quality which was appreciated by a number of others, including Jack Lemmon, who appeared with Terry-Thomas in How to Murder Your Wife. Lemmon commented that "like most really good professionals he was generous to fellow actors. He worked with you, not at you".

Before starting filming or making an entrance on stage, Terry-Thomas had a routine he would undertake: "my own technique to get myself going was ... to jump in the air and execute a few dance steps". His approach for much of his film work was to underplay many of his reactions. Filming a scene in a cinema in Private's Progress, a close-up was needed showing his character "registering shock, fury, indignation and anything else I could stuff in"; he "just looked into the camera and kept my mind blank. It's a trick I've used often since. In this way, the audience does the work". Terry-Thomas said "I like to do my own stunts", which he did for films such as A Matter of WHO and Bachelor Flat. This included some dangerous work; for example, during Those Magnificent Men in their Flying Machines, he ran along the roof of a moving train.

== Legacy and reputation ==
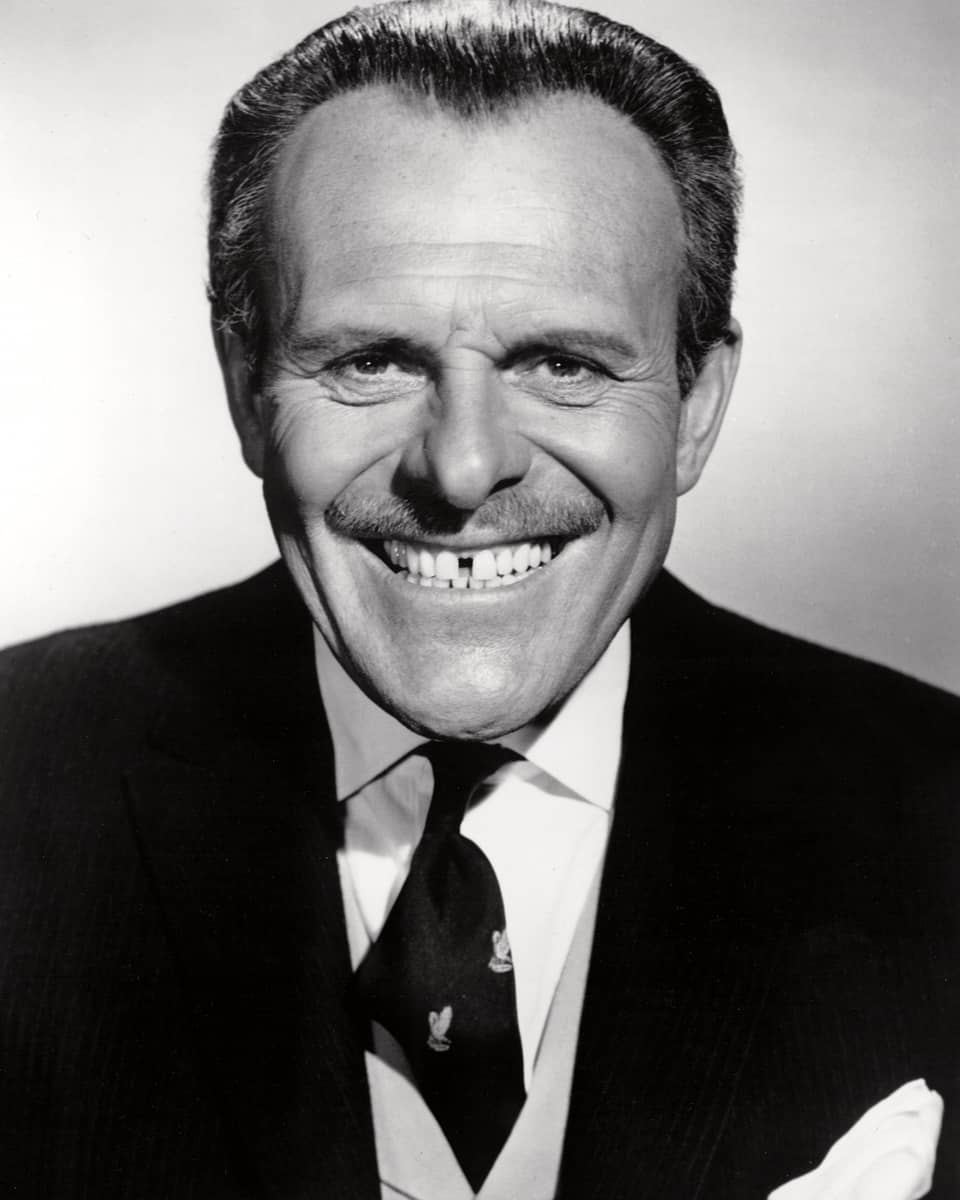
Terry-Thomas in 1961, showing his dental diastema which later provided the basis for naming a widening of the scapholunate space ("Terry-Thomas sign") in a traumatic wrist injury.

Following Terry-Thomas's death, Lionel Jeffries called him "the last of the great gentlemen of the cinema", while the director Michael Winner commented that "no matter what your position was in relation to his, as the star he was always terribly nice. He was the kindest man and he enjoyed life so much". Reviewing his career in The Guardian, Adrian Turner considered that "we took him for granted and he was ideal for his time. Not to put too serious a point on it, his portrayal of crass stupidity and blatant deviousness struck a chord with British audiences during the fifties as they experienced the clumsy dismemberment of the Empire and the 'never had it so good' ethos of the Macmillan era. During the sixties he became a glorious anachronism, much in demand in America, who saw in him the irrelevant pageantry of Britain"; he also said Terry-Thomas was "a national treasure". Gilbert Adair, writing in The Independent, considered that "for three decades, and in literally scores of films, he personified the Englishman as amiable bounder"; Adair wrote that "the characterisation he was to assume represented the very essence of patrician, double-barrelled caddishness". Terry-Thomas's friend Jack Lemmon called him "a consummate professional ... he was a gentleman, a delight to be with personally, let alone professionally, and above all as an actor he had one of the qualities that I admire so much—he made it look simple".

Terry-Thomas's image of an English cad was used by others. The personification started in the 1960s when the voice actor Ivan Owen, who had worked alongside Terry-Thomas in "Stars in Battledress", based the voice for Basil Brush on that of Terry-Thomas, in a characterisation which also copied Terry-Thomas's "penchant for bad, self-satisfied, golf-club-bore jokes". The 1960s also witnessed the fictional cartoon character Dick Dastardly in two Hanna-Barbera cartoon series (Wacky Races and Dastardly and Muttley in Their Flying Machines), who was inspired by Terry-Thomas.

Other actors have used Terry-Thomas's persona as an inspiration for their characters: Dustin Hoffman acknowledged that he based his interpretation of Captain Hook in Hook on him; Rupert Everett disclosed that when he provided the voice for Prince Charming in Shrek 2 Terry-Thomas "was vocally my role model while I was doing it"; and Paul Whitehouse's character, the 13th Duke of Wybourne, from The Fast Show was also modelled on Terry-Thomas's on-screen persona. Mark Ruffalo listed Terry-Thomas as one of the inspirations for his performance as Duncan Wedderburn in Poor Things.

Terry-Thomas's popularity continued after his death. In February 1999 the National Film Theatre ran a season of his films; an NFT spokesman described how attendees turned up "in evening dress, with false moustaches and carrying cigarettes in long holders ... everyone has been trying to steal the cardboard cutouts of Terry ... We've never had a response like it. To be honest, we are rather unprepared. Nobody expected Terry-Thomas Fever".

Some of the innovations Terry-Thomas brought into his earlier television programmes were later copied by others; How Do You View? provided the "prologue" format of Up Pompeii!, and was the first to use regular BBC announcers as foils in comic sketches—a practice continued later, particularly with the shows of Morecambe and Wise. Terry-Thomas's anecdotes, stringing several stories together, later inspired Ronnie Corbett in his monologue spot in his series The Two Ronnies. In 2014, BBC Radio 4 broadcast Memories of a Cad, a comedy drama by Roy Smiles about the relationship between Terry-Thomas and Richard Briers, played by Martin Jarvis and Alistair McGowan respectively.

== Notes and references ==
=== Bibliography ===
- Amis, Kingsley (1991). Memoirs. London: Hutchinson. ISBN 0-09-174533-0.
- Banham, Martin (1995). The Cambridge Guide to Theatre. Cambridge: Cambridge University Press. ISBN 978-0-521-43437-9.
- Barfe, Louis (2008). Turned Out Nice Again: The Story of British Light Entertainment. London: Atlantic Books. ISBN 978-1-84887-757-3.
- Everett, Wendy Ellen (2005). European identity in cinema. Bristol: Intellect Books. ISBN 978-1-84150-916-7.
- Film Review Digest. Vol. 2. Millwood, NY: Kraus-Thomson Organization. 1976.
- Fowler, Christopher (2013). Film Freak. London: Transworld Publishers. ISBN 978-1-4481-5459-3.
- Hallenbeck, Bruce G. (2009). Comedy-horror Films: A Chronological History, 1914–2008. Jefferson, NC: McFarland & Company. ISBN 978-0-7864-5378-8.
- Hayes, Nicky; Hill, Jeff (1999). 'Millions Like Us'?: British Culture in the Second World War. Liverpool: Liverpool University Press. ISBN 978-0-85323-763-1.
- "Heroes of Comedy: Terry-Thomas". Heroes of Comedy. Series 1. Episode 5. London. 17 November 1995. Channel 4.
- Hope-Hawkins, Richard; Nicholls, C. S. (2004). "Stevens, Thomas Terry Hoar (Terry-Thomas) (1911–1990)". Oxford Dictionary of National Biography (online ed.). Oxford University Press. doi:10.1093/ref:odnb/39948. (Subscription, Wikipedia Library access or UK public library membership required.)
- Lewisohn, Mark (1998). Radio Times Guide to TV Comedy. London: BBC Books. ISBN 978-0-563-36977-6.
- McCann, Graham (2009). Bounder! The Biography of Terry-Thomas. London: Aurum Press. ISBN 978-1-84513-441-9.
- Mayer, Geoff (2003). Guide to British Cinema. Westport, CT: Greenwood Press. ISBN 978-0-313-30307-4.
- Morrison, Donald; Compagnon, Antoine (2010). The Death of French Culture. Cambridge: Polity. ISBN 978-0-7456-4994-8.
- Pettigrew, Terence (1982). British Film Character Actors: Great Names and Memorable Moments. Newton Abbot: David & Charles. ISBN 0-7153-8270-5.
- Pirie, David (2008). A New Heritage of Horror: the English Gothic Cinema. London: I.B. Tauris. ISBN 978-1-84511-481-7.
- Ross, Robert (2002). The Complete Terry-Thomas. London: Reynolds & Hearn. ISBN 978-1-903111-29-1.
- Secombe, Harry (1996). Strawberries and Cheam. London: Robson Books. ISBN 978-0-230-53252-6.
- Spicer, Andrew (2003). Typical Men: The Representation of Masculinity in Popular British Cinema. London: I.B. Tauris. ISBN 978-1-86064-931-8.
- Sykes, Eric (2003). Eric Sykes' Comedy Heroes. London: Virgin Books. ISBN 978-0-7535-0966-1.
- Terry-Thomas (1959). Filling the Gap. London: Max Parrish & Co. OCLC 6187836.
- Terry-Thomas; Daum, Terry (1990). Terry-Thomas Tells Tales. London: Robson Books. ISBN 978-0-86051-662-0.
- Wisdom, Norman (2011). My Turn: An Autobiography. London: Random House. ISBN 978-1-4464-7273-6.
- Yochum, Terry R.; Rowe, Lindsay J. (2005). Essentials of Skeletal Radiology. Baltimore, MD: Lippincott Williams & Wilkins. ISBN 978-0-7817-3946-7.
- Young, Christopher (1977). The Films of Doris Day. New York, NY: Citadel Press. ISBN 978-0-8065-0583-1.
