= High Finance (Dad's Army) =

- Dad's Army episode
- Episode no.: Series 8 Episode 5
- Directed by: David Croft
- Story by: Jimmy Perry and David Croft
- Original air date: 3 October 1975
- Running time: 30 minutes

Episode chronology
← Previous "Come In, Your Time Is Up"	Next → "The Face on the Poster"

"High Finance" is the fifth episode of the eighth series of the British comedy series Dad's Army. It was originally broadcast on 3 October 1975.

== Synopsis ==
Jones is overdrawn at the bank, and after a long investigation Mainwaring discovers that this has been caused by ARP Warden Hodges exorbitantly raising Mrs Pike's rent.

== Plot ==
Jones arrives at the bank to pay in his takings, and cash a cheque. Pike refuses to cash his cheque because he is overdrawn. In Mainwaring's office, Mainwaring attempts to explain why he cannot cash the cheque. Jones does not understand why, having just paid money in, he cannot take money out. Mainwaring complains that the cheque is stained, and Jones explains it is from a piece of liver. Mainwaring then asks what Jones is going to do about "it", meaning his overdraft, and Jones replies that maybe he could "keep the cheques away from the meat". Mainwaring insists on coming round to Jones's shop after work to try to see where his overdraft has come from.

After Jones has gone, rather upset, Wilson suggests Mainwaring could give Jones an overdraft because he is in the platoon, but Mainwaring refuses to bend the rules.

In Jones's shop Mainwaring attempts to examine Jones books, but chaos ensues. Mainwaring gets a fly paper stuck on his bowler hat and Pike attempts to cut if off, but trims off the rim as well, so Mainwaring cannot lift his hat. Pike then tips all Jones's carefully sorted ration tickets onto the floor. Mainwaring takes all Jones's books home, much to Frazer's horror.

The next morning, Jones agrees with Mainwaring's laborious conclusion from Jones's chaotic books that his business is £50 short, and then tells Mainwaring that he has an unpaid bill from the orphanage for £50, which he produces from his pocket. Mainwaring is furious at having all his time wasted. In attempting to track down why the orphanage cannot pay the £50, Mainwaring interviews, in turn, the Vicar, Miss Twelvetrees and Frazer. He then convenes a meeting, inviting Wilson, Warden Hodges, the Pikes, the Verger, the Vicar, Frazer, Godfrey and Jones.

In the meeting, Mainwaring tracks the £50. Mrs Pike borrowed it from Wilson, who borrowed it from Godfrey, who borrowed it from Frazer. Frazer then withheld his rent from Miss Twelvetrees, who could not make her usual donation to the vicar, who could not pay Jones's meat bill. The meeting hears with horror that Mrs Pike needed the money to pay a huge increase in rent demanded by her landlord, the Warden. Mrs Pike then says that Hodges had said he would "let me off if I was 'nice to him'". At this, Wilson deliberately gets up, walks slowly but purposefully round the table and punches the Warden in the face, knocking him off his chair. The room is stunned, especially the Pikes, who are very impressed. Hodges complains that he has always liked her but that she is besotted with Wilson, to which Pike says "Why don't you hit him again, Uncle Arthur!" Hodges is shamed into cashing a £50 cheque from Mainwaring, who gives it to Mrs Pike, who gives it to Wilson, to Godfrey, to Frazer, to Miss Twelvetrees, to the Vicar, via the Verger to Jones, who gives it back to Mainwaring.

All is concluded, and Mainwaring's triumph seems complete and unblemished, but then he is confronted in front of everyone by the irate grocer, Mr Swann, to whom Mainwaring's wife owes £49 17/6, and he has to pay up.

== Cast ==
- Arthur Lowe as Captain Mainwaring
- John Le Mesurier as Sergeant Wilson
- Clive Dunn as Lance Corporal Jones
- John Laurie as Private Frazer
- Arnold Ridley as Private Godfrey
- Ian Lavender as Private Pike
- Janet Davies as Mrs Pike
- Bill Pertwee as ARP Warden Hodges
- Edward Sinclair as The Verger
- Frank Williams as The Vicar
- Colin Bean as Private Sponge
- Natalie Kent as Miss Twelvetrees
- Ronnie Brody as Mr Swann

== Notes ==
1. Pike makes a reference to the Charlie Chan series of films starring Warner Oland, in particular Charlie Chan in London (1934), when Mainwaring calls a meeting to reveal the identity of the villain.
