= Graham McCann =

British author and historian

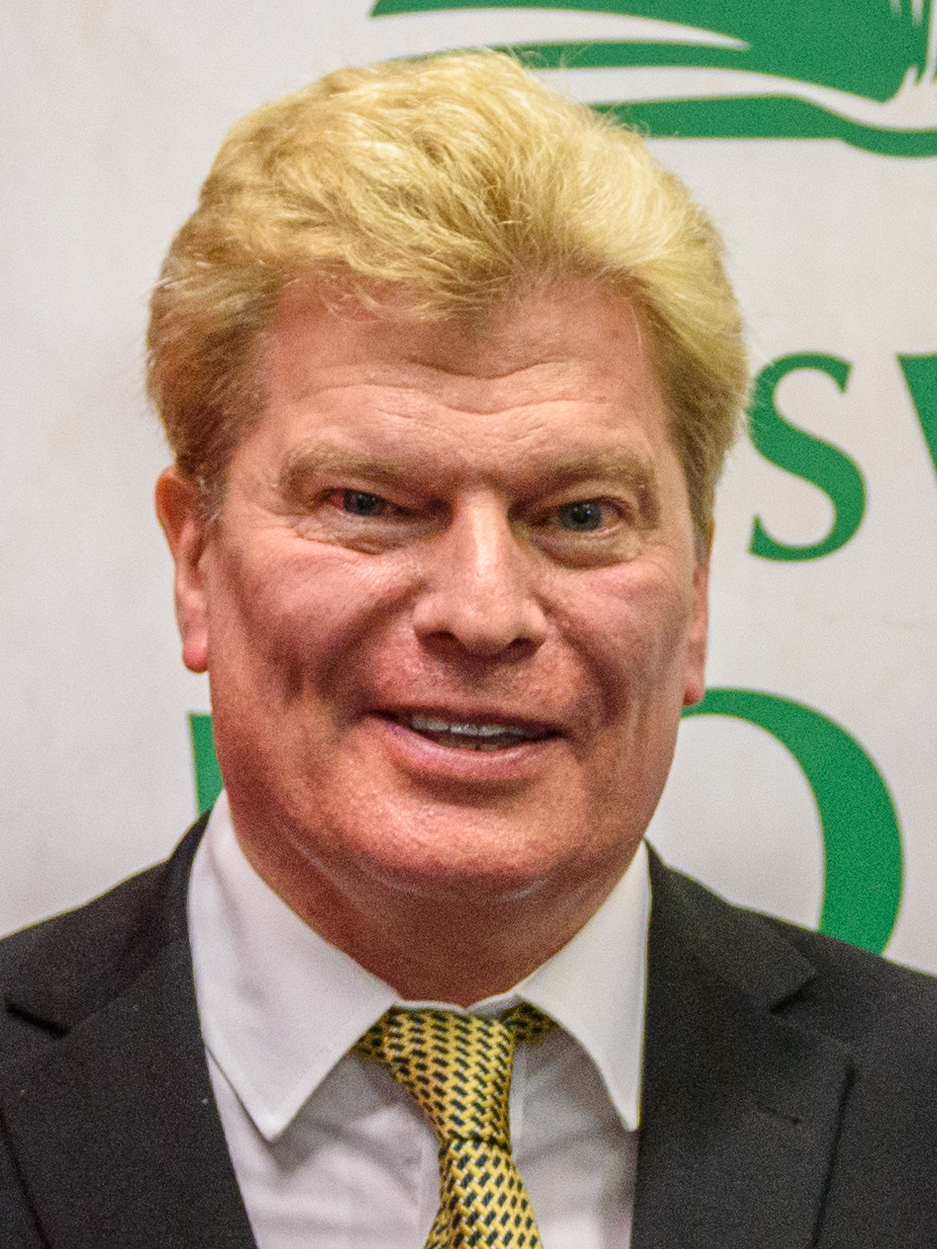
- McCann in 2022
- Education: Cambridge University; King's College, Cambridge
- Occupations: Writer, historian
- Years active: 1988–present
- Notable work: Marilyn Monroe; Cary Grant: A Class Apart; Frankie Howerd: Stand-Up Comic

Graham McCann is a British author and historian who has written extensively on film and television stars and British comedy series. He is a former lecturer and fellow at the University of Cambridge where he taught social and political theory.

McCann has become noted for his biographies on figures such as Cary Grant, Marilyn Monroe, John Le Mesurier, Woody Allen and Terry-Thomas, and books about British television comedy such as Dad's Army, Yes Minister, Only Fools and Horses, Fawlty Towers and Open All Hours. He also contributes to various newspapers.

== Teaching career ==
McCann earned a doctorate at Cambridge University and, before becoming a full-time writer, was a fellow and lecturer in social and political theory at King's College, Cambridge. Among his fields of expertise is American culture, and in 1993 he lectured on "Aspects of American Culture" at the university. He also taught in the university's continuing education programme, primarily in the subject of the history of British political thought.

== Writing career ==
McCann has published at least 17 books. His 1988 biography of Marilyn Monroe was the first to approach her life from a sociological perspective. This subject was revisited in his chapter "Biographical Boundaries: Sociology and Marilyn Monroe" in The Body: Social Processes and Cultural Theory published in 1991. He followed this with a biography of Woody Allen (1991), and with Rebel Males (1993), an analysis of the influence of Montgomery Clift, Marlon Brando and James Dean and their transformative role in moving the masculine heroic role in American popular culture closer to a sensitivity associated with bisexuality. He received praise for his 1997 biography of Cary Grant, A Class Apart. Andrea Highbie of The New York Times described the book as "well-researched", while Publishers Weekly considered it a more comprehensive account than Geoffrey Wansell's Cary Grant: Dark Angel book.

Many of McCann's books concern British television, especially comedians and comedy series. HarperCollins describe him as "Britain's leading writer about film and TV". He has published biographies of Morecambe and Wise (1998), John Le Mesurier (Do You Think That's Wise?, 2010) and Terry-Thomas (Bounder!, 2008). In 2004, he published a biography of comic Frankie Howerd. Simon Callow writing for The Guardian noted the book's "occasional tantalising glimpses of his friendships" and "gamely attempts to sketch the broad outlines of Howerd's sex-life".

In 2001 he published Dad's Army – The Story of a Classic Television Show. He has also authored Only Fools and Horses: The Untold Story of Britain's Favourite Comedy (2011), Fawlty Towers (2012), A Very Courageous Decision: The Inside Story of Yes Minister and Still Open All Hours: The Story of a Classic Comedy both (2014), and has edited a book containing material by the comedian Dave Allen (The Essential Dave Allen, 2005). McCann has written numerous articles about politics and popular culture for The Guardian, Evening Standard, The Independent, The Daily Telegraph, Daily Express, The Sunday Times, The Observer, The Washington Post, The Times Literary Supplement, The Modern Review, Sight & Sound, Radical Philosophy and the New Statesman. He has acted as a consultant to programme makers; during the early 2000s he was the television critic for the Financial Times.

In May 2015 he was awarded the "Best Correspondents prize" at the Leicester Comedy Festival on a writing piece which documented his discovery that Roy Clarke had been commissioned to write a sitcom for Morecambe and Wise, a project which was never finalised.

== Published works (Alphabetical by title) ==
- Amnesty International (4 October 2012). Graham McCann (ed.). A Poke in the Eye (With a Sharp Stick): Amnesty Presents the Best of the Secret Policeman's Ball (Main ed.). Canongate Books. ISBN 978-0857867346. – 2 editions
- A Very Courageous Decision: The Inside Story of Yes Minister. Aurum Press Ltd. 1 November 2014. ISBN 978-1781311899. – 5 editions
- Bounder!: The Biography of Terry-Thomas. Aurum Press. 2009. ISBN 9781845134419. – 5 editions
- Cary Grant: A Class Apart. Fourth Estate. 1996. ISBN 9781857025743.
- Eisler, Hanns; Adorno, Theodor W.; McCann, Graham (Introduction) (11 December 2007) [1947]. Composing for Films (Illustrated ed.). Continuum. ISBN 9780826499028. – 10 editions
- Dad's Army: The Story of a Very British Comedy: The Story of a Classic Television Show (New ed.). Fourth Estate. 1 September 2002. ISBN 978-1841153094.
- Do You Think That's Wise?: The Life of John Le Mesurier. Aurum Press. 8 November 2010. ISBN 978-1845136529. – 5 editions
- Fawlty Towers (First ed.). Hodder & Stoughton. 18 October 2007. ISBN 978-0-340-89811-6. – 6 editions
- Frankie Howerd: Stand-Up Comic (illustrated ed.). HarperCollins UK. 1 October 2004. ISBN 1841153109. – 2 editions
- Marilyn Monroe. New Brunswick, N.J: Rutgers University Press. 1988. ISBN 978-0813513027. – 4 editions
- Morecambe and Wise. Robson Books Ltd. 1998. ISBN 9780860519027. – 2 editions
- Only Fools and Horses. Splendid. 1 September 2011. ISBN 978-0955891694. – 5 editions
- Rebel Males: Brando, Clift and Dean. London: Hamish Hamilton. 1991. ISBN 9780241128848. – 4 editions
- Spike & Co: Inside the House of Fun with Milligan, Sykes, Galton & Simpson. Hodder & Stoughton Paperbacks. 11 January 2006. ISBN 9780340898093. – 4 editions
- Still Open All Hours: The Story of a Classic Comedy. BBC Books. 30 October 2014. ISBN 978-1849908863. – 4 editions
- The Comedy Carpet Blackpool: The Making of a World Class Monument to Comedy. Booth Clibborn. 1 November 2013. ISBN 978-1861543394.
- The Essential Dave Allen. Hodder & Stoughton Ltd. 7 November 2005. ISBN 0340899433. – 5 editions
- Woody Allen: New Yorker. Polity Press. 1990. ISBN 9780745608907. – 2 editions
