= Joan Cooper =

British actress (1922–1989)

- Born: 10 August 1922; Chesterfield, Derbyshire, England
- Died: 1 July 1989 (aged 66); Hayfield, Derbyshire, England
- Spouses: Richard Gatehouse (m. 1941; div. 1947) Arthur Lowe (m. 1948; died 1982)
- Children: 3

Joan Cooper (10 August 1922 – 1 July 1989) was a British actress.

Her second husband was the actor Arthur Lowe whom she met at the Manchester Repertory Theatre in 1946. They were married at the Register Office, Strand, London, in January 1948. She had three children – Jane Gatehouse and David Gatehouse (children from a previous marriage) and Stephen Lowe (born 1953 at Hammersmith, London, UK).

She had some minor roles alongside him, particularly playing Private Godfrey's sister Dolly in some episodes of Dad's Army. In 1977–78 she also toured with Lowe in theatres around the UK as Dorothy Redfern in J. B. Priestley's Laburnum Grove.

Lowe died in April 1982, and five years later Cooper moved to his parents' cottage in Hayfield, Derbyshire, which had been vacant since his mother's death in 1981. She lived there until her death from stomach cancer at the age of 66.

== Filmography ==
Year	Title	Role	Notes
1969	It All Goes to Show	(unnamed)	short
1970	Rookery Nook	Gertrude Twine	TV movie
1972	The Ruling Class	Nurse Brice	
1976	The Bawdy Adventures of Tom Jones	Nellie	
1980	Sweet William	Aunt Bee	
