= Colin Bean =

English actor (1926–2009)

- Bean as Private Sponge in Dad's Army
- Born: 15 April 1926; Wigan, England
- Died: 20 June 2009 (aged 83); Wigan, England
- Occupation: Actor
- Years active: 1963–1988

Colin Bean (15 April 1926 – 20 June 2009) was an English actor. He was best known for his role as Private Sponge in the BBC comedy series Dad's Army.

== Early life ==
Born in Wigan, Lancashire, Bean's father played football for local side Wigan Borough, and he attended Wigan Grammar School. Bean's first appearance had been as a shepherd in a school play, and much against his parents' intentions, he took up acting professionally until being called up for National Service. He served for four years in the British Army after World War II, spending some time in Japan, and taking the opportunity to continue his acting by joining the British Commonwealth Occupation Force (BCOF). After graduating from drama school in 1952, he joined the Sheffield Rep as assistant stage manager; regular theatre work followed.

== Career ==
His work in Dad's Army came as a result of working at Watford Rep in 1962 under series co-writer Jimmy Perry as the company's actor-manager, in addition to almost 20 years of playing a pantomime dame. His role in Dad's Army started off relatively small but grew as the series progressed, in 1997 he said "by the time of The Miser's Hoard I'd ended up on the front row of the platoon, it was a lovely feeling. Instead of peering and smirking over Jones' shoulder, I was on the front line. It was very satisfying." His TV appearances were varied, including Z-Cars, The Gnomes of Dulwich, The Liver Birds, thirteen episodes of Michael Bentine's Potty Time, Are You Being Served?, and the penultimate episode of Hi-de-Hi! (1988).

Due to his arthritis, in his later years he concentrated on his radio work. He wrote his autobiography, Who Do You Think You Are Kidding!, which was published in 1998 and went into two editions.

Though using a wheelchair in his later years, he continued to make sporadic appearances on stage in the north west of England discussing his long acting career. He was also a regular at Dad's Army reunions. He continued to live in the Scholes area of his native Wigan until his death, aged 83, in Wigan Infirmary, on 20 June 2009.

== Filmography ==
=== Television ===
Year	Title	Role	Notes
1955	Red Riding Hood	King Wolf	TV film
1961	Richard the Lionheart	Yeoman	Episode: School for a King
1963	Z Cars	Mr Cowpe	Episode: Members Only
1966	No Hiding Place	Det Sgt Parsons	Episode: It Isn't Just The Money...
1968-77	Dad's Army	Private Sponge	Recurring role in 76 episodes
1969	The Gnomes of Dulwich	Various roles	3 episodes
1969	Gold robbers	Prison Imate	Episode: Dog eat Dog
1969	Harry Worth Show	Policeman	
1969	The Goodies	Knight	
1969	The First Churchills	Lord Russell	2 episodes
1969	Broaden Your Mind	Various roles	3 episodes
1970	Up Pompeii!	Centurion	
1971	Now Take My Wife	Dirty Macintosh Man	
1971-72	The Liver Birds	First speaker/Police constable	2 episodes
1972	His Lordship Entertains		Episode: The Safari Park
1972	Scott on Language	Indian Chief	
1973	Elementary My Dear Watson	Aged newseller	
1973	Michael Bentine Time	Various roles	13 episodes
1973	Are You Being Served?	Leatherette Gloves	
1976-78	Potter's Picture Palace	Vicar	3 episodes
1976	Fallen Hero	Loud Supporter	
1980	Cousin Phillis	Robinson	
1981	Ladykillers	Clerk of Court	Episode: A Smile is Sometimes Worth a Million Dollars
1981	Cribb	Police constable	Episode: Invitation to a Dynamite Party
1983	Crown Court	Foreman of the Jury	
1985	Good as Gold	His Worship the Mayor	TV film
1986	Jossy's Giants		Episode: The Siege of St James'
1988	Hi-de-Hi!	Verger	
