= Terry-Thomas on screen, radio, stage and record =

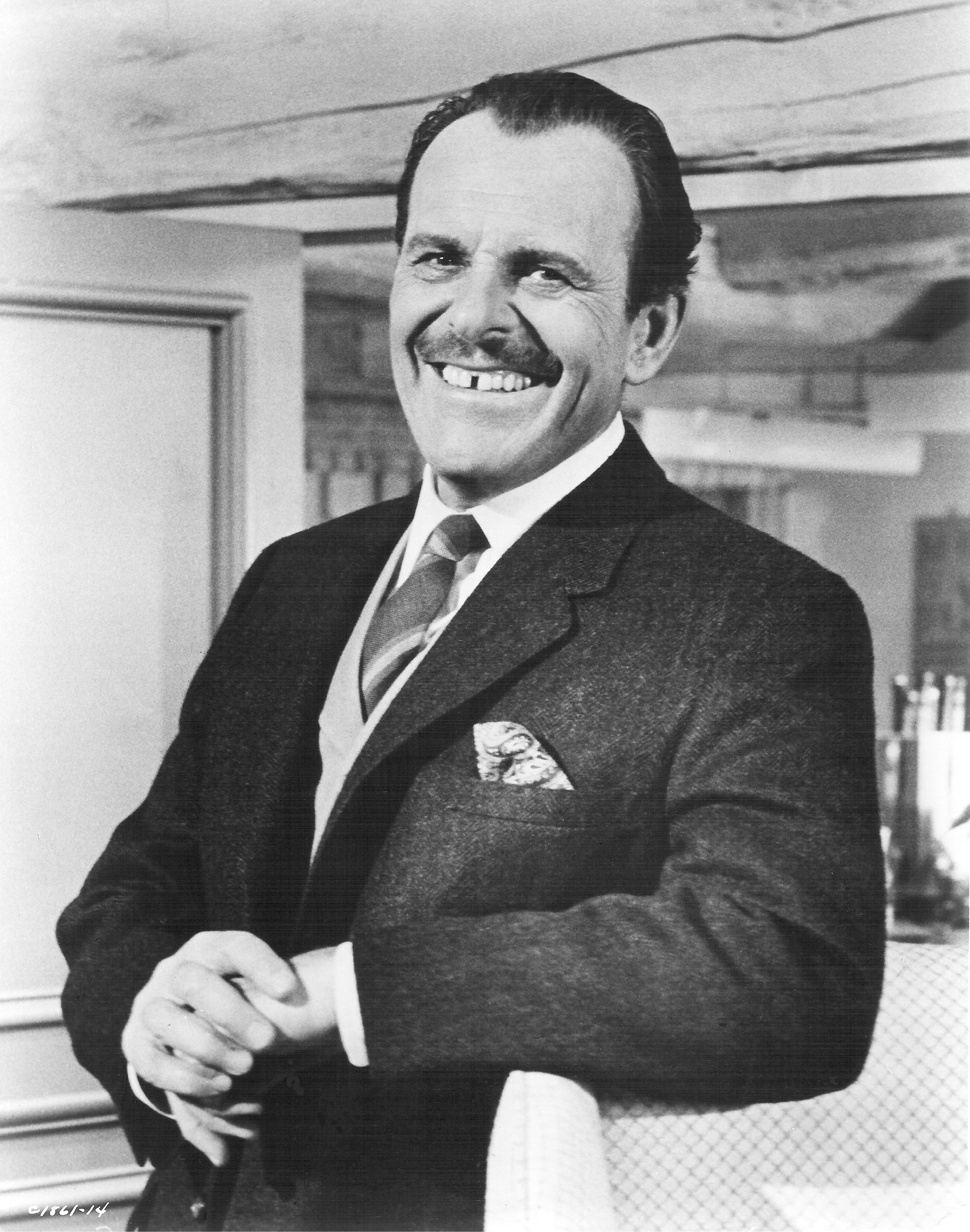
Terry-Thomas in Where Were You When the Lights Went Out?, 1968

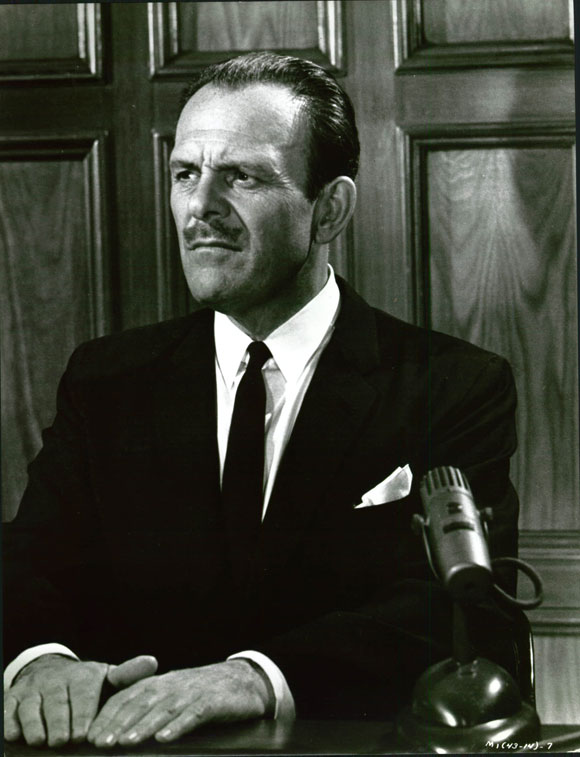
Terry-Thomas in How to Murder Your Wife, 1965

The English actor and comedian Terry-Thomas (1911–1990) performed in many mediums of light entertainment, including film, radio and theatre. His professional career spanned 50 years from 1933 until his retirement in 1983. During this time he became synonymous with playing the "silly-ass Englishman", a characterisation that he had portrayed from his time on the variety circuit.

Terry-Thomas made his film debut as an extra in the 1933 film, The Private Life of Henry VIII, which starred Charles Laughton in the title role; Terry-Thomas continued to undertake a series of small and uncredited film roles while his reputation grew on radio and television. He played his first role on radio in the 1938 BBC tea dance programme Friends to Tea, before spending the Second World War with the Royal Corps of Signals and ENSA, the Entertainments National Service Association.

After the war, Terry-Thomas began his stage career with an appearance in Piccadilly Hayride at the Prince of Wales Theatre, London; the show was a hit and he appeared in it from September 1946 until January 1948. In 1949 he appeared in his first television programme, Technical Hitch, and scored a success later that year with his own television series, How Do You View?, which was noted for being the first comedy series on British television. In 1956 he was cast by the Boulting brothers in Private's Progress. The role boosted his film career, initially in Britain, and then in America. In 1958 Terry-Thomas released the first of two solo comedy records, Strictly T-T; the same year he also appeared as Bertie Wooster in a cast recording of Jeeves, with Roger Livesey playing Jeeves.

I've been called any number of things in print. T-T with his permanent air of caddish disdain ... bounder ... aristocratic rogue ... upper-class English twit ... genuine English eccentric ... one of the last real gentlemen ... wet, genteel Englishman ... high-bred idiot ... cheeky blighter ... camel-haired cad ... amiable buffoon ... pompous Englishman ... twentieth-century dandy ... stinker ... king of the cads ...
All those descriptions added up to my image as Terry-Thomas.

During the 1960s and 1970s, Terry-Thomas' appearances on stage and radio were becoming less frequent but his television and film output remained consistent, despite his diagnosis with Parkinson's disease in 1971; by the mid-1980s, though, the disease had effectively ended his career. On his death, The Guardian observed that "as an upper class twit or as a debonair rascal, Terry-Thomas had few equals", and described him as "a national treasure", while The Independent considered that he "personified the Englishman as amiable bounder".

== Filmography ==
Filmography of Terry-Thomas
Film	Year	Role	Notes
The Private Life of Henry VIII	1933	Extra	Uncredited
The Ghost Goes West	1935	Extra	Uncredited
Cheer Up	1936	Extra	Uncredited
When Knights Were Bold	1936	Extra	Uncredited
Things to Come	1936	Extra	Uncredited
Once in a Million	1936	Extra	Uncredited
It's Love Again	1936	Extra	Uncredited
Rhythm in the Air	1936	Frankie	Uncredited
This'll Make You Whistle	1936	Extra	Uncredited
Take a Chance	1937	Cast member	Uncredited
Rhythm Racketeer	1937	Cast member	Uncredited
Climbing High	1938	Cow	Production finished in 1938, film released in 1939; Voice, Uncredited
Sam Goes Shopping	1939	Boyfriend	Uncredited
Flying Fifty-Five	1939	Bit at Racetrack	Uncredited
For Freedom	1940	News reader	Uncredited
Under Your Hat	1940	Cast member	Uncredited
Quiet Wedding	1941	Extra	Uncredited
If You Don't Save Paper	1948	Shop Assistant	
Copy Book Please	1948	On-screen participant	3-minute instructional film
A Date with a Dream	1948	Terry	
The Brass Monkey	1948	Himself	
Helter Skelter	1949	Himself	
Melody Club	1949	Freddy Forrester	
What's Cooking?	1951	Cast member	Also called Cookery Nook
The Queen Steps Out	1952	Cast member	
Private's Progress	1956	Major Hitchcock	
The Green Man	1956	Charles Boughtflower	
Brothers in Law	1956	Alfred Green	
Lucky Jim	1957	Bertrand Welch	
The Naked Truth	1957	Lord Henry Mayley	
Blue Murder at St Trinian's	1957	Romney Carlton-Ricketts	
Happy Is the Bride	1958	Policeman	
Tom Thumb	1958	Ivan	Nominated for BAFTA Award for the "Best British Actor in 1959"
Too Many Crooks	1959	William Delany Gordon	
Carlton-Browne of the F.O.	1959	Cadogan de Vere Carlton-Browne	
I'm All Right Jack	1959	Major Hitchcock	
School for Scoundrels	1960	Raymond Delauney	
That's Odd	1960	Cast member	15-minute short
Make Mine Mink	1960	Major Albert Rayne	
His and Hers	1961	Reggie Blake	
A Matter of WHO	1961	Archibald Bannister	
Bachelor Flat	1962	Professor Bruce Patterson	
Operation Snatch	1962	Lieutenant "Piggy" Wigg	
The Wonderful World of the Brothers Grimm	1962	Ludwig	('The Singing Bone')
Kill or Cure	1962	J. Barker Rynde	
It's a Mad, Mad, Mad, Mad World	1963	Lt-Colonel J. Algernon Hawthorne	
The Mouse on the Moon	1963	Spender	Nominated for Golden Globe Award for Best Actor – Motion Picture Musical or Comedy
Terry-Thomas in Tuscany	1963	Host	Producer; 15-minute short
Terry-Thomas in the South of France	1963	Host	Producer; 19-minute short
Terry-Thomas in Northern Ireland	1963	Host	Producer; 19-minute short
How to Murder Your Wife	1965	Charles Furbank	
Strange Bedfellows	1965	Mortician	
Those Magnificent Men in Their Flying Machines	1965	Sir Percy Ware-Armitage	
You Must Be Joking!	1965	Major Foskett	
The Wild Affair	1965	Godfrey Deane	
Our Man in Marrakesh	1966	El Caid	
The Daydreamer	1966	Brigadier Zachary Zilch	
Munster, Go Home!	1966	Freddie Munster	
The Sandwich Man	1966	Scoutmaster	
Kiss the Girls and Make Them Die	1966	James; Lord Aldric	
La Grande Vadrouille	1966	Sir Reginald	
Top Crack	1967	Charles	
A Guide for the Married Man	1967	Technical Advisor; "Tiger"	
Jules Verne's Rocket to the Moon	1967	Captain Sir Harry Washington Smythe	
The Perils of Pauline	1967	Sten Martin	
How to Kill 400 Duponts	1967	Commissioner Green	
Arabella	1967	General Sir Horace Gordon; Duke Pietro Moretti; hotel manager; insurance manager	
Seven Times Seven	1967	Police Inspector	Originally titled Sette Volte Sette
Danger: Diabolik	1968	Minister of the Interior, then Minister of Finance	
Don't Raise the Bridge, Lower the River	1968	H. William Homer	
Where Were You When the Lights Went Out?	1968	Ladislaus Walichek	
Uno Scacco Tutto Matto	1968	Il Direttore Dorgeant	Also known as Checkmate for McDowell or It's Your Move
How Sweet It Is!	1968	Mr Tilly	
2000 Years Later	1969	Charles Goodwyn	
Monte Carlo or Bust!	1969	Sir Cuthbert Ware-Armitage	Originally called Quei Temerari Sulle Loro Pazze, Scatenate, Scalcinate Carriole
Arthur? Arthur!	1969	Clennery Tubbs	
Una Su Tredici	1969	Albert	Also known as 12 + 1 or The Thirteen Chairs
Atlantic Wall	1970	Commandant Perry	
The Abominable Dr. Phibes	1971	Dr Longstreet	
Colpo Grosso ... Grossissimo ... Anzi Probabile	1972	Pierre Le Compte	
Dr. Phibes Rises Again	1972	Lombardo	
Tunisia – Yesterday and Today	1972	Commentator	16-minute short
Gli Eroi	1973	John Cooper	Also known as The Heroes
The Vault of Horror	1973	Arthur Gritchit	
Robin Hood	1973	Sir Hiss	Voice
The Cherry Picker	1974	Appelby	
Chi ha rubato il tesoro dello scia?	1974		
Side by Side	1975	Max Nugget	
Closed Up-Tight	1975		
Spanish Fly	1976	Sir Percy de Courcy	
The Bawdy Adventures of Tom Jones	1976	Mr. Square	
The Last Remake of Beau Geste	1977	Prison Governor	
Kingdom of Gifts	1978	The Bumbling Chancellor	Voice
The Hound of the Baskervilles	1978	Dr Mortimer	
The Mysterious House of Dr C	1978	The Bull	
La Isla De Las Cabezas	1979	Cast member	
Febbre a 40!	1980	Dr Christopher	Also known as Happy Birthday Harry!

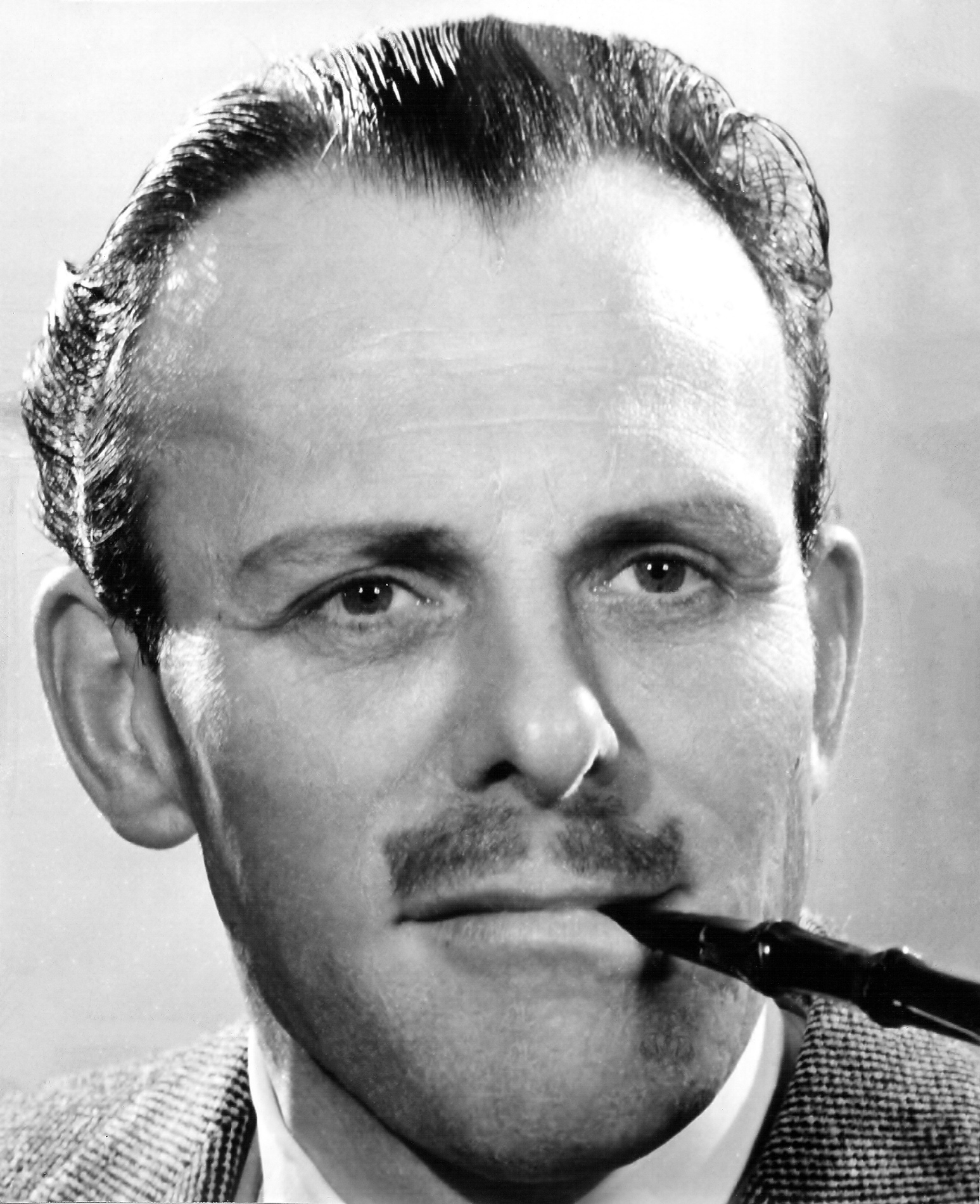
Terry-Thomas, May 1951

== Radio ==
Radio broadcasts of Terry-Thomas
Broadcast	Date	Channel	Notes
Friends to Tea	6 June 1938	London Regional	
Anzac Hour	5 March 1943	BBC General Forces Programme	
Anzac Hour	9 March 1943	BBC General Forces Programme	
We're All Together Now	5 January 1944	BBC Home Service	
Strike a Home Note	29 November 1944	BBC General Forces Programme	
Band Party	6 August 1945	BBC Home Service	
Out of the Hat	24 January 1946	BBC Home Service	
Folly to be Wise	1 April 1946	BBC Light Programme	
They're Out	14 May 1946	BBC Light Programme	
Variety Star Show	8 June 1946	BBC General Overseas Service	
George Elrick's Band Party	6 July 1946	BBC Light Programme	
Caribbean Carnival	15 July 1946	BBC General Overseas Service	
Variety Bandbox	1 September 1946	BBC Light Programme	
Cabaret	17 September 1946	Midland Home Service	
Worker's Playtime	25 October 1946	BBC Home Service	
Variety Bandbox	27 October 1946	BBC Light Programme	
Happidrome	12 November 1946	BBC Light Programme	
The Carroll Levis Show	8 December 1946	BBC Light Programme	
Piccadilly Hayride	23 December 1946	BBC Home Service	
Variety Bandbox	25 December 1946	BBC Light Programme	
Worker's Playtime	10 January 1947	BBC Home Service	
The Carroll Levis Show	26 January 1947	BBC Light Programme	
Variety Bandbox	23 February 1947	BBC Light Programme	
Worker's Playtime	28 February 1947	BBC Home Service	
Happidrome	4 March 1947	BBC Light Programme	
The Carroll Levis Show	16 March 1947	BBC Light Programme	
Variety Bandbox	20 April 1947	BBC Light Programme	
Worker's Playtime Anniversary Programme	27 May 1947	BBC Home Service	
Accordion Club	30 May 1947	BBC Light Programme	
Variety Bandbox	1 June 1947	BBC Light Programme	
Up and Doing	21 June 1947	BBC Home Service	
Variety Bandbox	29 June 1947	BBC Light Programme	
Worker's Playtime	4 July 1947	BBC Home Service	
Up and Doing	2 August 1947	BBC Home Service	
Variety Bandbox	10 August 1947	BBC Light Programme	
The Carroll Levis Show	24 August 1947	BBC Light Programme	
Accordion Club	11 September 1947	BBC Light Programme	
Navy Mixture	18 September 1947	BBC Home Service	
Alhambra of the Air	19 October 1947	BBC Light Programme	
Worker's Playtime	21 October 1947	BBC Home Service	
October Revue	31 October 1947	BBC Home Service	
Variety Bandbox	2 November 1947	BBC Light Programme	
Accordion Club	6 November 1947	BBC Light Programme	
The Carroll Levis Show	13 November 1947	BBC Light Programme	
November Revue	25 November 1947	BBC Home Service	
Christmas Crackers	24 December 1947	BBC Light Programme	
Night Shift	13 January 1948	BBC Light Programme	
Caribbean Carnival	23 January 1948	BBC General Overseas Service	
Worker's Playtime	3 February 1948	BBC Home Service	
Worker's Playtime	4 February 1948	BBC Home Service	
Caribbean Carnival	25 May 1948	BBC General Overseas Service	
Worker's Playtime	30 May 1948	BBC Home Service	
Worker's Playtime	15 June 1948	BBC Home Service	
Worker's Playtime	16 June 1948	BBC Home Service	
Variety Bandbox	1 August 1948	BBC Light Programme	
Worker's Playtime	7 September 1948	BBC Home Service	
Worker's Playtime	8 September 1948	BBC Home Service	
Variety Hall of Fame	23 September 1948	BBC Light Programme	
Best Indian Rendezvous	5 October 1948	BBC Light Programme	
Alhambra of the Air	6 October 1948	BBC Light Programme	
To Town with Terry	12 October 1948 – 28 March 1949	BBC Home Service	24 episodes; broadcast weekly
Music Hall	16 April 1949	BBC Light Programme	
Worker's Playtime	28 April 1949	BBC Home Service	
Caribbean Carnival	5 July 1949	BBC General Overseas Service	
The Vera Lynn Show	7 July 1949	BBC Light Programme	
Variety Bandbox	23 October 1949	BBC Light Programme	
Variety Bandbox	1 January 1950	BBC Light Programme	
Henry Hall's Guest Night	11 January 1950	BBC Home Service	
Music Hall	21 January 1950	BBC Light Programme	
Variety Fanfare	3 February 1950	BBC Home Service	
Variety Bandbox	9 April 1950	BBC Light Programme	
Henry Hall's Guest Night	26 April 1950	BBC Home Service	
Worker's Playtime	28 April 1950	BBC Home Service	
Something to Sing About	27 May 1950	BBC Light Programme	
Variety Fanfare	13 July 1950	BBC Home Service	
Variety Bandbox	13 August 1950	BBC Light Programme	
Variety Fanfare	27 August 1950	BBC Home Service	
Variety Fanfare	31 August 1950	BBC Home Service	
Variety Fanfare	16 September 1950	BBC Home Service	
Henry Hall's Guest Night	16 October 1950	BBC Home Service	
Music Hall	25 October 1950	BBC Light Programme	
Variety Bandbox	3 December 1950	BBC Light Programme	
Can You Beat It	12 December 1950	BBC Home Service	
Calling All Forces	17 December 1950	BBC Home Service	
Can You Beat It	19 December 1950	BBC Home Service	
Worker's Playtime	22 December 1950	BBC Home Service	
Henry Hall's Guest Night	25 December 1950	BBC Home Service	
Can You Beat It	26 December 1950	BBC Home Service	
Can You Beat It	2 January 1951	BBC Home Service	
Can You Beat It	9 January 1951	BBC Home Service	
Henry Hall's Guest Night	10 January 1951	BBC Home Service	
Can You Beat It	16 January 1951	BBC Home Service	
Can You Beat It	19 January 1951	BBC Home Service	
Calling All Forces	21 January 1951	BBC Home Service	
Can You Beat It	6 February 1951	BBC Home Service	
Can You Beat It	13 February 1951	BBC Home Service	
Can You Beat It	20 February 1951	BBC Home Service	
Music Hall	24 February 1951	BBC Light Programme	
Can You Beat It	27 February 1951	BBC Home Service	
Henry Hall's Guest Night	7 March 1951	BBC Home Service	
Can You Beat It	26 March 1951	BBC Home Service	
Henry Hall's Guest Night	27 March 1951	BBC Home Service	
Anglo-American Programme	4 July 1951	BBC Light Programme	
Top of the Bill	8 August 1951	BBC Light Programme	
Calling All Forces	18 August 1951	BBC Home Service	
Happy-Go-Lucky	30 August 1951	BBC Light Programme	
Music Hall	23 February 1952	BBC Light Programme	
Dick Turpin	27 February 1952	BBC Light Programme	
Henry Hall's Guest Night	9 April 1952	BBC Home Service	
Calling All Forces	5 May 1952	BBC Light Programme	
All Star Bill	10 June 1952	BBC Light Programme	
Henry Hall's Guest Night	15 October 1952	BBC Home Service	
All Star Bill	20 October 1952	BBC Light Programme	
Star Show	1 November 1952	BBC Light Programme	
Forces Show	11 November 1952	BBC Light Programme	
Variety Playhouse	23 May 1953	BBC Home Service	
Hip, Hip, Hooray	25 May 1953	BBC Light Programme	
BBC Ballroom	1 June 1953	BBC Light Programme	
Top of the Town	5 June 1953	BBC Home Service	Pilot episode
Star Bill	9 August 1953	BBC Light Programme	
Worker's Playtime	27 August 1953	BBC Home Service	
Ignorance Is Bliss	30 September 1953	BBC Light Programme	
Star Bill	25 October 1953	BBC Light Programme	
Top of the Town	1 November 1953 – 21 February 1954	BBC Light Programme	16 episodes, broadcast weekly; series one
Variety at the Capitol	31 January 1954	BBC Light Programme	
Variety at the Capitol	7 February 1954	BBC Light Programme	
Variety at the Capitol	21 February 1954	BBC Light Programme	
Star Bill	4 April 1954	BBC Light Programme	
Variety Playhouse	8 May 1954	BBC Home Service	
Royal Salute	15 May 1954	BBC Home Service	
Thank Your Lucky Stars	17 June 1954	BBC Light Programme	
Blackpool Nights	14 July 1954	BBC Light Programme	
Blackpool Nights	11 August 1954	BBC Light Programme	
In Town Tonight	15 October 1954	BBC Home Service	
Top of the Town	31 October 1954 – 27 February 1955	BBC Light Programme	16 episodes, broadcast weekly; series two
Desert Island Discs	13 February 1956	BBC Home Service	
Star Struck	26 February 1956	BBC Home Service	
The Peers Parade	11 May 1957	BBC Light Programme	
Variety Playhouse	28 December 1957	BBC Home Service	
The Laughtermakers	26 March 1958	BBC Home Service	
Today Today	24 March 1959	BBC Light Programme	
In Town Tonight	21 November 1959	BBC Home Service	
In Town Tonight	19 August 1961	BBC Home Service	
Home This Afternoon	17 February 1966	BBC Light Programme	
Home This Afternoon	21 March 1966	BBC Light Programme	
Spoken Words	24 November 1966	WNYC-FM (USA)	
Open House	23 April 1970	BBC Radio 2	
Arthur Askey's Seventieth Birthday	6 June 1970	BBC Radio 4	
Desert Island Discs	1 August 1970	BBC Radio 4	

== Stage credits ==
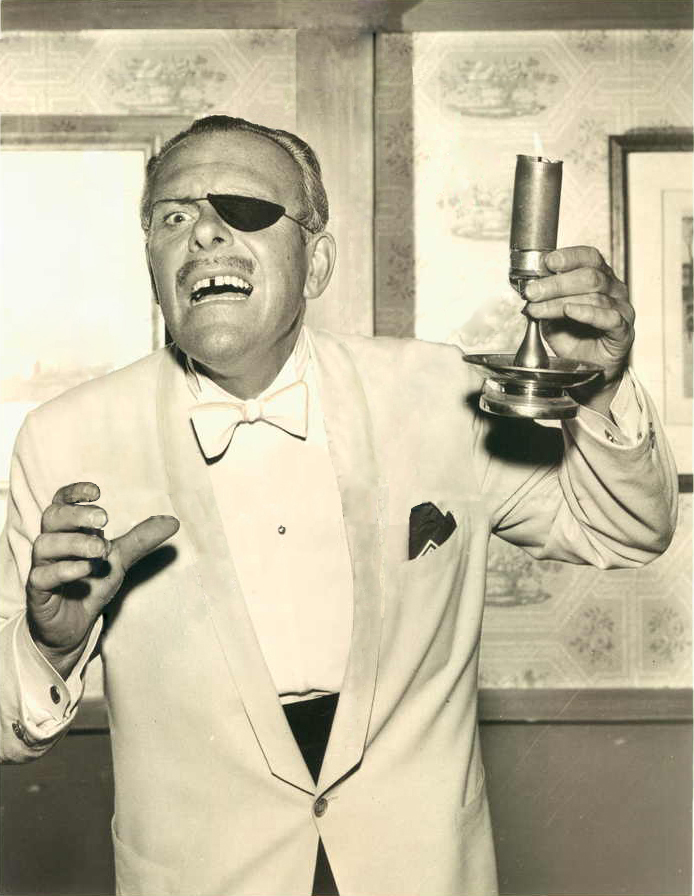
"Everyone was talking about the gap between my teeth, my monocle, the fancy waistcoats I wore and the seven-inch cigarette holders I used". – Terry-Thomas on his look

Stage credits of Terry-Thomas
Production	Date	Theatre	Notes
Piccadilly Hayride	September 1946 – January 1948	Prince of Wales Theatre, London	
Variety	13 September 1946	London Palladium	
Royal Variety Performance	4 November 1946	London Palladium	
Variety	June 1948	London Palladium	
Variety	27 September – 4 October 1948	London Palladium	
Cabaret	Spring 1949	Paris	
The Gracie Fields Show	15 – 23 May 1949	Empress Hall, London	
NSPCC Midsummer Ball	22 June 1949	Dorchester Hotel, London	
Summer Season	Summer 1949	New Royal Theatre, Bournemouth	
Cabaret	October – November 1949	Palma House Night Club, Chicago	
Variety	10 – 17 April 1950	The Chelsea Palace, London	
Summer Season	1950	Opera House Theatre, Blackpool	
Out of this World	5 October 1950	Opera House Theatre, Blackpool	
A Night of Variation	12 November 1950	Bedford Theatre, London	
Jingle Bells	December 1950	Wood Green Empire, London	
Cabaret	31 December 1950	The Garter Club, Mayfair	
Cabaret	June 1951	The Wedgwood Room, Waldorf Astoria Hotel, New York	
Humpty Dumpty	22 December 1951 – 29 February 1952	London Palladium	109 performances
Top of the Town	July 1952	Opera House Theatre, Blackpool	
Concert Party	September 1952	Military bases, Malaya	
Royal Variety Performance	3 November 1952	London Palladium	
Dick Whittington	December 1952 – January 1953	Johannesburg	As the Honourable Idle Jack
Variety	July 1953	Pier Pavilion, Llandudno	
Summer Season	1953	Palace Theatre, Blackpool	
Fun and the Fair	7 October – 19 December 1953	London Palladium	138 performances
Dick Whittington	December 1953 – January 1954	Granada, Sutton; Granada, Woolwich; Finsbury Park Empire	As the Honourable Idle Jack
Summer Season	1954	Winter Gardens Pavilion, Blackpool	
Room for Two	28 February – 2 April 1955 (Note: McCann shows the start date of the stay at the Prince of Wales as 7 March 1955.)	Prince of Wales Theatre, London; preceded by a national tour. (Note: Terry-Thomas broke his arm while performing at the Brighton Hippodrome, but returned five days later when the tour reached London.)	As Hubert Crone; 48 performances
Summer Season	1956	Morecambe	
Charley's Aunt	August – September 1956	Blackpool	As Lord Fancourt Babberley
Variety	24 – 29 September 1956	Prince of Wales Theatre, London	
King John	28 October 1956	Adelphi Theatre, London	
Season of Variety	January 1957	Prince of Wales Theatre, London	
Carroll Levis's Sensational TV Star Search	September 1957	Shrewsbury	
Jingle Bells	27 December 1957	Wood Green Empire, London	
Our Friends the Stars	13 March 1957	Victoria Palace Theatre, London	
Large as Life	23 May – 13 December 1958	London Palladium	As one of The Three Musketeers; 380 performances
Cabaret	1 January 1959	Savoy Hotel, London	
It's in the Bag	March – May 1960	Provincial tour	
It's in the Bag	25 May – 4 June 1960	Duke of York's Theatre, London	
Revue	March – April 1963	New South Wales	
Don't Just Lie There, Say Something!	1971	The Metro Theatre, Sydney	

== Television ==
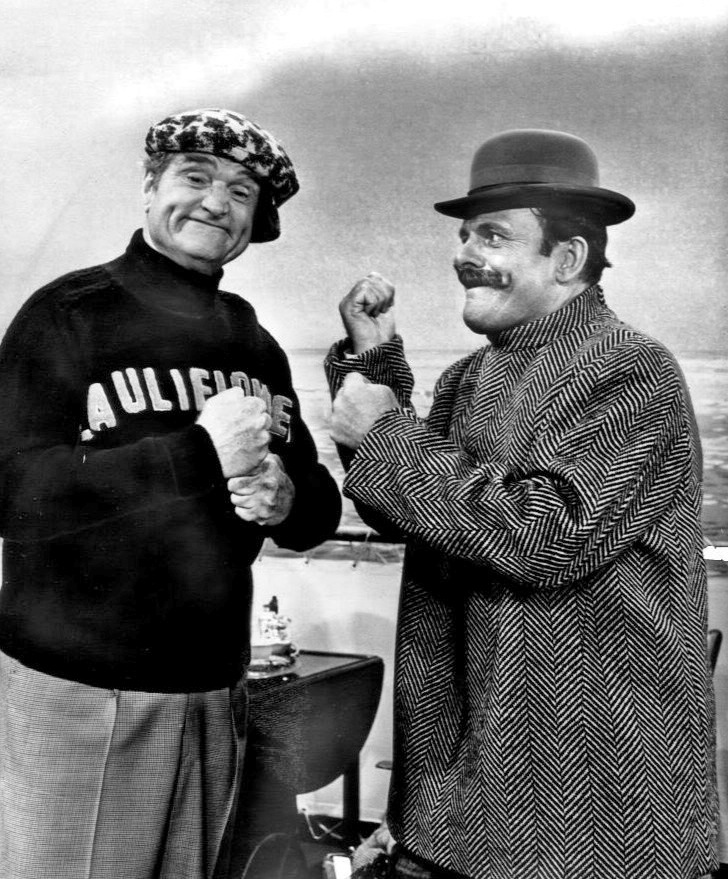
Terry-Thomas as a guest star on The Red Skelton Show. Shown here with Skelton.

Television appearances of Terry-Thomas (Note: This list does not include Terry-Thomas' television appearances in advertisements, which included Van Heusen shirts, Mars bars and a series of four advertisements for the Lyons drink "Bev".)
Programme	Date	Channel	Role	Notes
Technical Hitch	11 October 1947	BBC Television Service		Live broadcast
Stars in Your Eyes	30 January – 6 May 1949	BBC Television Service	Cast member	
How Do You View?	26 October – 21 December 1949	BBC Television Service	Cast member	Series one; script by Terry-Thomas
How Do You View?	5 April – 17 May 1950	BBC Television Service	Cast member	Series two; Terry-Thomas also wrote additional material for the programme
Picture Page	25 April 1950	BBC Television Service	Cast member	
How Do You View?	8 November 1950 – 28 February 51	BBC Television Service	Cast member	Series three
Toast of the Town	15 March 1951	CBS (USA)		
Vic Oliver Introduces ...	16 June 1951	BBC Television Service		
How Do You View?	19 September 1951 – 28 November 1951	BBC Television Service	Cast member	Series four
Hello Up There	12 October 1951	BBC Television Service		
La Belle Hélène	25 November 1951	BBC Television Service	Compere	
What's My Line?	17 December 1951	BBC Television Service	Celebrity challenger	
Joan Gilbert at Home	26 March 1952	BBC Television Service		
How Do You View?	2 April – 11 June 1952	BBC Television Service	Cast member	Series five
How Do You View?	9 September 1953	BBC Television Service	Cast member	Special edition
For Your Pleasure	28 October 1953	BBC Television Service		
Television's Christmas Party	25 December 1953	BBC Television Service		
The Name's the Same	26 January 1954	BBC Television Service		
Variety Parade	6 April 1954	BBC Television Service		
The Pat Kirkwood Show	8 May 1954	BBC Television Service		
Celebration Music Hall	15 May 1954	BBC Television Service		
Stars at Blackpool	15 July 1954	BBC Television Service		
In Town Tonight	15 October 1954	BBC Television Service		Television broadcast of Home Service radio show
The Richard Hearne Show	4 December 1954	BBC Television Service		
Variety Parade	3 May 1955	BBC Television Service		
Around the Town	1 October 1955	BBC Television Service		
Jack Hylton Presents "Saturday Night at the London Palladium"	6 November 1955	Associated-Rediffusion/ITV		
Dance Music	8 December 1955	Associated-Rediffusion/ITV		
Bird in Hand	25 December 1955	BBC Television Service	Cyril Beverley	
Strictly T-T	12 January – 8 March 1956	BBC Television Service		Five episodes
Celebrity	11 May 1956	ATV/ITV		
1-2-3 Click	11 May 1956	ATV/ITV		
My Wildest Dreams	15 May – 5 December 1956	Granada/ITV		Series one; 28 episodes
The Holiday Show	6 August 1956	BBC Television Service		
Jack Hylton Presents "Friday Night"	10 August – 7 September 1956	Associated-Rediffusion/ITV		Three episodes
We Are Your Servants	27 October 1956	BBC Television Service		
Off the Record	12 November 1956	BBC Television Service		
Sunday Night at the London Palladium	9 December 1956	ATV/ITV		
The Harry Secombe Show	31 December 1956	BBC Television Service		
My Wildest Dreams	30 January – 11 June 1957	Granada/ITV		Series two; 15 episodes
Jack Hylton's Music Box	8 February 1957	Associated-Rediffusion/ITV		
What's My Line?	24 February 1957	BBC Television Service		
Beat Up the Town	22 April 1957	BBC Television Service		
Personal Appearance	30 April 1957	ATV/ITV		
The Alma Cogan Show	9 May 1957	BBC Television Service		
The Secombe Saga	7 December 1957	BBC Television Service		
A Santa for Christmas	26 December 1957	ATV/ITV		
What's My Line?	16 March 1958	BBC Television Service		
The Terry-Thomas Show	29 March 1958	ATV/ITV		
The World Our Stage	5 April 1958	BBC Television Service		
What's My Line?	14 December 1958; 21 December 1958	BBC Television Service		
Tonight Starring Jack Paar	16 November 1959	NBC (USA)		
Armchair Theatre: "Lord Arthur Savile's Crime"	3 January 1960	ABC (USA)/ITV	Lord Arthur Saville	
Close Up	23 June 1960	Associated-Rediffusion/ITV		
The Bing Crosby Show	11 December 1961	ABC (USA)		
Juke Box Jury	2 June 1962	BBC tv		
The Perry Como Show	31 October 1962	NBC (USA)		
What's My Line?	7 April 1963	BBC tv		
Terry-Thomas	20 July 1963	BBC tv		
The British at Play	21 August 1963	Associated-Rediffusion/ITV		
The Judy Garland Show	13 October 1963	CBS (USA)		
Burke's Law	18 October 1963; 24 January 1964; 24 February 1964	ABC (USA)	The Man	
Here's Edie	16 January 1964	ABC (USA)		
What's My Line?	17 May 1964	CBS (USA)		
An Hour with Robert Goulet	19 November 1964	CBS (USA)		
A Long View Leslie Mitchell	17 February 1965	Westward Television		
The Andy Williams Show	8 March 1965	NBC (USA)		
Everybody's Got a System	18 June 1965	ABC (USA)	Narrator	
The Man from U.N.C.L.E.: "The Five Daughters Affair"	31 March 1967; 7 April 1967	NBC (USA)	Constable	
The Red Skelton Hour	22 May 1967	CBS (USA)		
Comedy Playhouse: "The Old Campaigner"	22 May 1967	BBC1	James Franklin-Jones	
The Red Skelton Hour	17 October 1967	CBS (USA)		
The Red Skelton Hour	20 February 1968	CBS (USA)		
Rowan & Martin's Laugh-In	4 March 1968	NBC (USA)		
Monte Carlo: C'est La Rose	6 March 1968	ABC (USA)		
The Big Show	7 April 1968	ATV/ITV		
The Old Campaigner	6 December 1968 – 10 January 1969	BBC1	James Franklin-Jones	
This is Tom Jones	28 February 1969	ITV		Also broadcast on ABC (USA) on 2 March 1969
The Hollywood Palace	22 March 1969	ABC (USA)		
The Liberace Show	18 May 1969	LWT/ITV		
Howdy	8 August 1969	NBC (USA)		
Music Hall	12 October 1969; 19 October 1969	LWT/Seven Network (Aus)		
The Peapicker in Piccadilly	24 November 1969	NBC (USA)		Also broadcast on ITV on 31 December 1969
The Des O'Connor Show	16 May 1970	ATV/ITV		
The Dick Cavett Show	20 May 1970	ABC (USA)		
The Kraft Music Hall	1 July 1970	NBC (USA)		
The Dickie Henderson Show	23 April 1971	LWT/ITV		
Parkinson	10 June 1971	BBC1		
The Mike Douglas Show	2–6 August 1971	KYW-TV (USA)		
The Kraft Music Hall	1 September 1971	NBC (USA)		
Hollywood Squares	8–12 November 1971; 15–19 November 1971	NBC (USA)		
The Persuaders!: "The Man in the Middle"	16 December 1971	ITC/ITV	Archie Sinclair Beauchamp	
Rowan & Martin's Laugh-In	21 February 1972; 13 March 1972	NBC (USA)		
Film Night	26 August 1972	BBC1		
The Dave Cash Radio Show	16 November 1972	ATV/ITV		
Russell Harty Plus	20 January 1973	LWT/ITV		
I Love a Mystery	27 February 1973	NBC (USA)		
The Special London Bridge Special	15 March 1973	BBC2		
Parkinson	19 October 1974	BBC1		
The Circus World Championships	20 February 1981	BBC1		
The Human Brain	31 May 1982; 21 June 1982	BBC2		

== Discography ==
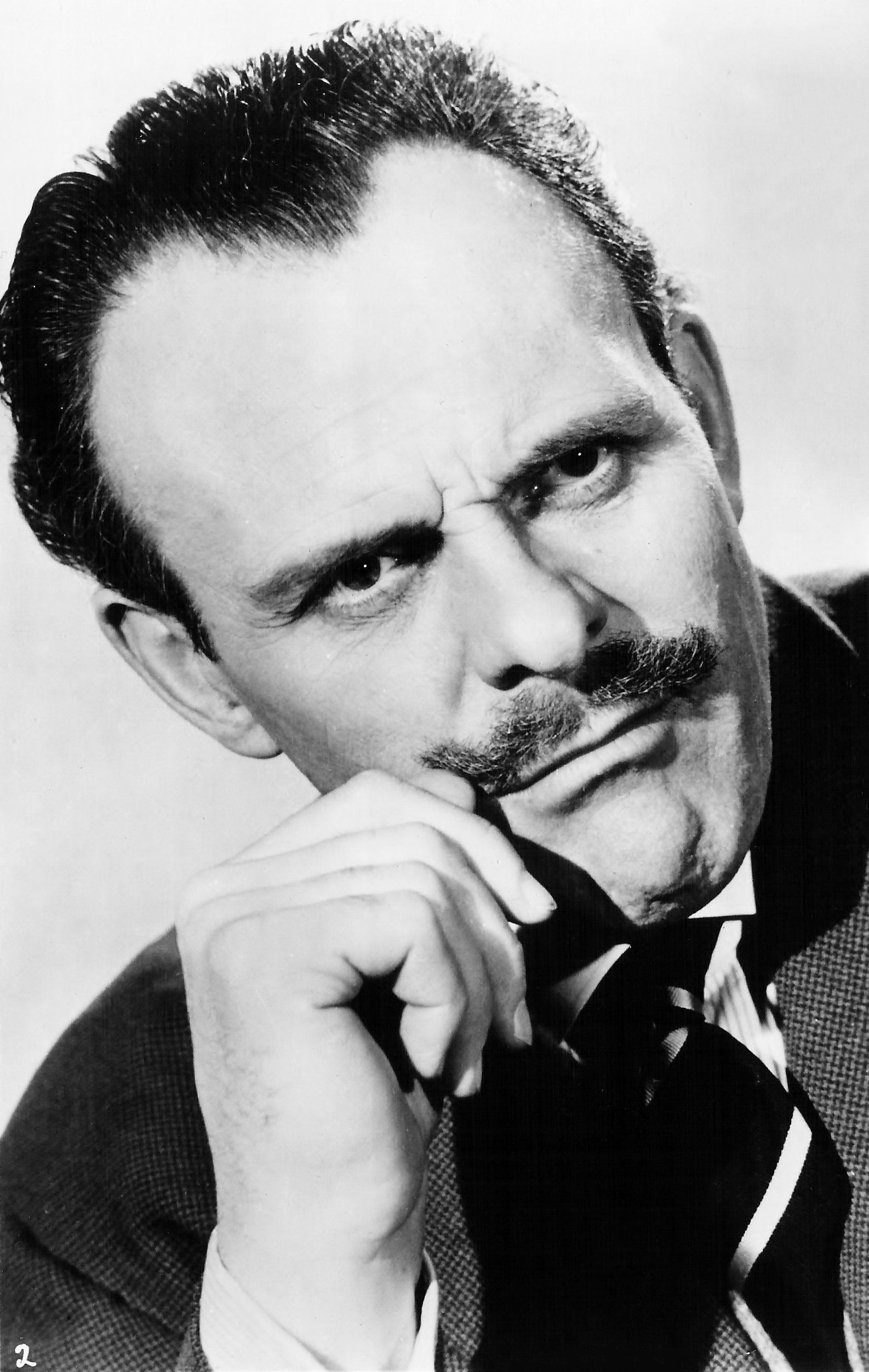
Terry-Thomas in The Bing Crosby Show, 1961

Albums

Album recordings by Terry-Thomas
Title	Year	Label	Type	Notes
Strictly T-T	1958	London LL3292	Solo	Re-released Decca LK4398 (1961) & London LP5764 (1963)
Jeeves	1958	Caedmon Audio TC1137	with Judith Furse, Rita Webb, Avril Elgar, Miles Malleson, and Roger Livesey	re-released in stereo, 1964, (TC-1137-S) – re-released Harper Audio HarperCollins 1559940042 (1989)
The Wonderful World of the Brothers Grimm	1962	MGM 1E/SIE/E-3	Cast recording	
Three Billion Millionaires!	1963	United Artists UXTL-4	Cast recording	
Terry-Thomas Discovers America	1964	Warner Bros W1558	Solo	
The Daydreamer	1966	Columbia LP OL-6540/OS-2940	Cast recording	
Vintage Variety	1973	BBC Records LP REC 134M	Cast recording	Extract is from Victory Star Show, 8 June 1946
Robin Hood	1973	Buena Vista 3810	Cast recording	
They Played the Palladium	1983	Decca LP RFLD 30	Cast recording	

Singles

Singles by Terry-Thomas
Title	Year	Label	Billed as	Notes
"A Sweet Old-Fashioned Boy" / "Lay Down Your Arms"	1956	Decca F10804	Terry-Thomas, Esq., & His Rock 'n' Roll Rotters / R.S.M. Terry-Thomas	78 rpm
"The Phantom Grenadier Strikes Again"	1959	—	Terry-Thomas	Produced and privately circulated by Terry-Thomas

== Notes and references ==
Notes

== Bibliography ==
- Hope-Hawkins, Richard; Nicholls, C. S. (2004). "Stevens, Thomas Terry Hoar (Terry-Thomas) (1911–1990)". Oxford Dictionary of National Biography (online ed.). Oxford University Press. doi:10.1093/ref:odnb/39948. (Subscription, Wikipedia Library access or UK public library membership required.)
- Hyatt, Wesley (2004). A Critical History of Television's The Red Skelton Show, 1951-1971. Jefferson, NC: McFarland & Company. ISBN 978-0-7864-1732-2.
- Mayer, Geoff (2003). Guide to British Cinema. Westport, CT: Greenwood Press. ISBN 978-0-313-30307-4.
- McCann, Graham (2009). Bounder! The Biography of Terry-Thomas. London: Aurum Press. ISBN 978-1-84513-441-9.
- Ross, Robert (2002). The Complete Terry-Thomas. London: Reynolds & Hearn. ISBN 978-1-903111-29-1.
- Terry-Thomas; Daum, Terry (1990). Terry-Thomas Tells Tales. London: Robson Books. ISBN 978-0-86051-662-0.
