= Danger: Diabolik =

1968 film by Mario Bava

- Italian theatrical release poster by Renato Casaro
- Italian: Diabolik
- Directed by: Mario Bava
- Screenplay by: Dino Maiuri; Brian Degas; Tudor Gates; Mario Bava
- Story by: Angela and Luciana Giussani; Dino Maiuri; Adriano Baracco
- Based on: Diabolik by Angela and Luciana Giussani
- Produced by: Dino De Laurentiis
- Starring: John Phillip Law; Marisa Mell; Michel Piccoli; Adolfo Celi; Terry-Thomas
- Cinematography: Antonio Rinaldi
- Edited by: Romana Fortini
- Music by: Ennio Morricone
- Production companies: Dino De Laurentiis Cinematografica; Marianne Productions
- Distributed by: Paramount Pictures
- Release dates: 24 January 1968 (Italy); April 1968 (Paris)
- Running time: 105 minutes
- Countries: Italy; France
- Budget: £200 million, USD $~3 million
- Box office: £715 million (Italy)

Danger: Diabolik (Italian: Diabolik) is a 1968 action and crime film directed and co-written by Mario Bava, based on the Italian comic series Diabolik by Angela and Luciana Giussani. The film is about a criminal named Diabolik (John Phillip Law), who plans large-scale heists for his girlfriend Eva Kant (Marisa Mell). Diabolik is pursued by Inspector Ginko (Michel Piccoli), who blackmails the gangster Ralph Valmont (Adolfo Celi) into catching Diabolik for him.

An adaptation of the comics was originally envisioned by producer Tonino Cervi, who set up an international co-production deal in 1965 and hired Seth Holt to direct the film with a cast that included Jean Sorel, Elsa Martinelli and Gilbert Roland. Appalled with Holt's footage, distributor Dino De Laurentiis assumed control of the film's production, electing to restart the project from scratch with a new screenplay and Bava as director. De Laurentiis produced the film in tandem with another comic book adaptation, Barbarella, with the two projects receiving financial support from Paramount Pictures and sharing several cast and crew members. Catherine Deneuve was initially cast as Eva, but her incompatibility with Law and disagreements with Bava led to the part being recast with Mell. Working under more financial and creative pressure than he was familiar with, Bava delivered Danger: Diabolik considerably below its assigned budget by utilizing many of the inexpensive visual effects techniques that he had used in his earlier films. It would prove to be the only film that he would direct for a major Hollywood studio.

Upon its theatrical release, Danger: Diabolik performed below De Laurentiis' expectations at the box office, and received negative reviews from The New York Times and Variety. With the re-evaluation of Bava's filmography, retrospective reception of the film has been more positive, with its visuals, the performances of Law and Mell, and the score by Ennio Morricone receiving praise. In studies of the film, critics and historians have focused on Bava's use of mise-en-scène to replicate the imagery and stylization of comic books, and the film's reflection of the socio-political upheavals of the 1960s in its characterization and narratology. Having garnered a cult following, Danger: Diabolik was chosen by Empire magazine as one of "The 500 Greatest Movies of All Time" in 2008. The first in a trilogy of new Diabolik films directed by the Manetti Bros. was released in 2021.

== Plot ==
In an unidentified European country, (Note: Although the Giussanis' comics take place in the fictional country of Clerville, which is based on Geneva, Kat Ellinger notes that this detail is not reinforced in the film itself, and that its setting instead reflects the "luxuriant, continental" locales seen in contemporary Eurospy, giallo and erotic films.) Police Inspector Ginko oversees the transportation of $10 million from a bank. To prevent the master thief Diabolik from stealing the money, he creates a diversion whereby a truck from the bank transports wastepaper, while a team of himself and disguised officers take the money in a Rolls-Royce. The plan is still foiled by Diabolik, who escapes with the money and his lover Eva Kant to their underground hideout, where they have sex on top of their loot.

Diabolik and Eva attend a press conference held by the Minister of the Interior, who reinstates the death penalty to dissuade criminals such as themselves; they disrupt the conference by releasing exhilarating gas into the crowd. Unable to locate Diabolik, Ginko and his fellow officers are granted emergency privileges that allow them to crack down on the activities of gangster Ralph Valmont, who they hope will aid in capturing him. Realizing their plan after a teen discotheque he operates is raided due to it being a front for his drug trafficking operations, Valmont makes a deal with Ginko.

While watching a news report, Diabolik decides to steal the famous Aksand emerald necklace from the Château de Saint-Just for Eva's birthday. After learning of Eva's features from a prostitute who spotted her scouting the castle, Valmont builds and circulates an identikit image of her. Diabolik scales the castle's sheer walls as the police lie in wait, and steals the necklace. Driving on his getaway, he and Eva fool the police by pulling a mirrored film across the road and using dummy decoys of himself; Eva is injured while setting up the film.

While visiting her private doctor, Eva is recognized from the identikit image and abducted. To rescue her, Diabolik boards Valmont's airplane with the stolen $10 million and the necklace to trade for Eva. He is ejected from the plane, but manages to grab Valmont just before a bomb he had planted earlier explodes. Diabolik rescues Eva as Ginko and the police close in on them. Eva makes her escape, while Diabolik loads a gun magazine with the emeralds and fires them at Valmont, killing him. He then seemingly commits suicide by taking a mysterious capsule. As the police hold a press conference about Diabolik's death, he is about to be autopsied when he returns to life, having faked his death using a technique created by Tibetan lamas which requires an antidote to be administered within twelve hours; posing as a nurse, Eva administers the antidote and sneaks him past the police and the press.

Later, a disguised Diabolik visits the morgue where Valmont's body has been cremated, collects the emeralds from his ashes and escapes, gifting them to Eva. Upon Ginko's realization that Diabolik is still alive, a million-dollar reward is offered for his capture; in retaliation, he blows up the tax offices. Despite pleas from the disgraced Minister of the Interior—now the Minister of Finance—the citizens refuse to pay their taxes, forcing the country into debt. Twenty tons of gold, which will be used to buy currency, are melted into a single block and sealed in a steel container to make it difficult to steal; the block is loaded onto a train commandeered by Ginko. Diabolik and Eva divert the train by leaving a burning truck on the tracks and re-route it to a bridge where a bomb is placed. It explodes when the train arrives, and the gold falls into the water below. As Ginko swims ashore, Diabolik and Eva collect the gold and return to their hideout.

The steel casket containing the gold is traced by the police, allowing them to track Diabolik's hideout. They close in on Diabolik, who is melting the gold in its container in order to drain it out, wearing a protective suit. Diabolik unsuccessfully attempts to flood his base and stop the police, leaving the gold container unattended. The container overheats, and when he returns to it, it explodes and covers him in molten gold, which solidifies and traps him. Believing Diabolik to have been killed, the police seal off the cavern, intending to recover the gold later. When Ginko arrives to arrest Eva, he allows her a private moment to pay her respects to Diabolik, who winks at her, having been protected in his suit.

== Cast ==
- John Phillip Law as Diabolik
- Marisa Mell as Eva Kant
- Michel Piccoli as Inspector Ginko
- Adolfo Celi as Ralph Valmont
- Claudio Gora as police chief
- Mario Donen as Sergeant Danek
- Terry-Thomas as Minister of the Interior, then Minister of Finance
- Renzo Palmer as Mr. Hammond, Second Minister of the Interior
- Caterina Boratto as Lady Clark
- Lucia Modugno as prostitute
- Annie Gorassini as Rose, Valmont's moll
- Carlo Croccolo as truck driver
- Lidia Biondi as policewoman
- Andrea Bosic as bank manager
- Federico Boido as Joe, Valmont's henchman
- Tiberio Mitri as Valmont's henchman
- Isarco Ravaioli as Valmont's henchman
- Giorgio Sciolette as Dr. Ferrara, forensic surgeon

Uncredited:

- Ennio Antonelli as syndicate member
- Giulio Donnini as Dr. Vernier
- Giuseppe Fazio as Tony, identikit operator
- Giorgio Gennari as Rudy, gas station informant
- Guidarino Guidi as Frank, syndicate member
- Wolfgang Hillinger as Valmont's henchman
- Edward Febo Kelleng as Sir Harold Clark
- Francesco Mulè as crematorium official
- Chuck Painter as newscaster
- Walter Williams as gold ingot supervisor

Credits adapted from Mario Bava: All the Colors of the Dark and the BFI.

== Production ==
=== Development ===
==== Tonino Cervi and Seth Holt ====
Angela and Luciana Giussani's Diabolik, widely considered to be the first example of the fumetti neri subgenre of Italian comics, was first published in November 1962. Producer Tonino Cervi, head of the production company Italy Film, was the first person to propose a film adaptation of Diabolik. Cervi was ambiguous when describing his production, stating once that "I think that with a few retouches Diabolik could turn into an extraordinary character for the silver screen." In another interview, he acknowledged that "nowadays a good film based on Flash Gordon would be a sensational success [...] but it would cost as much as Cleopatra. I have to settle for something more modest, so I'm doing Diabolik." Cervi's intention was to use the profits earned from Diabolik to recoup the costs of producing Red Desert and The Moment of Truth, as well as to finance an anthology film directed by Federico Fellini, Ingmar Bergman and Akira Kurosawa.

Italy Film acquired the adaptation rights from Astorina, the Giussanis' publishing house, for 20 million lire and proposed a distribution deal with Dino De Laurentiis. This deal would involve 100 million lire in advance, in exchange for the distribution rights for the film in perpetuity. De Laurentiis advanced 70 million lire, and put together a co-production deal between Italy, France (Les Films Marceau-Cocinor) and Spain (A.S. Film Produccion and Impala); the film's budget would ultimately be set at 501 million lire. The first drafts of the script were written by comic book writers Pier Carpi and Corrado Farina, who also worked in television advertising. These drafts were later revised by screenwriters Giampiero Bona and Fabrizio Onofri, who were told to tone down the violence. Onofri and Bona's screenplay also added an emphasis on comedy that was present in Andre Hunebelle's film Fantômas, another film about a master thief that was popular at the time. Diabolik's arch-nemesis from the comics, Inspector Ginko, was not included in the script as negative depictions of the police in media were a sensitive subject in Italy at the time. The film was helmed by British director Seth Holt, and the cast was led by Jean Sorel as Diabolik, Elsa Martinelli as Eva Kant and George Raft as Richness, an Auric Goldfinger-esque antagonist. Cervi's original choices for Diabolik and Eva had been Alain Delon (whose salary was too high) and Virna Lisi (who was unavailable due to scheduling conflicts), while James Mason, Peter Ustinov, Orson Welles and Gert Fröbe were considered for Richness. Other members of the cast included Marilù Tolo, Venantino Venantini and Jimmy Karoubi.

Principal photography began on 20 September 1965 in Málaga, Spain, but was halted when Raft was replaced with Gilbert Roland. Cervi and Holt's schedule required 29 days of interiors to be shot at De Laurentiis' sound stages at "Dinocittà", 17 days on location in Spain, two weeks on location in the United States, and an additional week in Spain. Filming halted again on 13 November; having viewed Holt's dailies, De Laurentiis temporarily aborted the film's production, stating that the footage "was of a level so low, both from an artistic and commercial point of view, as to make us clearly understand that to continue on that path meant heading toward disaster". In a 1969 interview, Holt said the film "didn't get stopped, it ran out of money. [...] It was mismanaged and so the film came to an end and everybody went home. Everybody is suing everybody. I got paid actually because I knew the Italian scene."

==== Dino De Laurentiis and Mario Bava ====
De Laurentiis felt that the only way to save the film was to restart production with a new script and director. The other production companies were not content with De Laurentiis stopping production, which led Les Films Marceau-Cocinor to terminate its contract with Italy Film. A.S. Film Produccion confiscated the footage and took cameras, costumes, and weapons that had been rented by Italy Film, which nearly bankrupted the company. During the interim, De Laurentiis capitalized on his newfound rights to the fumetti by including Diabolik alongside several other comic book characters in "An Evening Like the Others", Vittorio De Sica's segment of the anthology film The Witches starring Silvana Mangano and Clint Eastwood; here, Diabolik was portrayed by actor Gianni Gori. Director Umberto Lenzi unsuccessfully attempted to buy the rights to Diabolik from De Laurentiis, prompting him to instead make Kriminal, based on Magnus and Max Bunker's fumetti neri of the same name.

Deciding to make the film as an ancillary project complimenting his upcoming production of Barbarella—which was also an adaptation of a comic series—De Laurentiis restarted production with financial backing for both projects from Paramount Pictures and set up a two-film co-production deal with French producer Henri Michaud of Marianne Productions, who provided 20% of the film's budget. Mario Bava was reportedly suggested to De Laurentiis and the Giussanis by Farina, who was a fan of the director's giallo films, and informed the producer of Bava's popularity with cinephiles and intellectuals. Bava was also deemed by De Laurentiis to be a financially viable director, as Le spie vengono dal semifreddo (the Italian version of Dr. Goldfoot and the Girl Bombs) had been a commercial success; he was paid nearly 22 million lire to direct the film.

=== Writing and pre-production ===
The initial treatment for Danger: Diabolik was written by Adriano Baracco, which was then adapted into a full screenplay by Dino Maiuri, who had previously scripted the Eurospy comedy Kiss the Girls and Make Them Die for De Laurentiis. The script was later revised by the British writing team of Brian Degas and Tudor Gates, who were hired by Bava due to their positive collaboration on the aborted giallo project Cry Nightmare (later filmed by Antonio Margheriti as The Young, the Evil and the Savage). The final screenplay, which is credited to Maiuri, Degas, Gates and Bava in the English version of the film, and only to Maiuri and Bava in the Italian version, was based on three separate Diabolik stories: Sepolto vivo! (transl. Buried Alive!) from August 1963, Lotta disperata (Hopeless Battle) from March 1964, and L'ombra nella notte (The Shadows of Night) from May 1965. Degas and Gates' script bore the working title of Goldstrike! for Paramount to consider as an alternative title for the film's international release due to the fumetti being little known outside Italy; the film's English title was announced by Paramount's publicist Chuck Painter to be Danger: Diabolik on 29 November 1967. De Lautentiis was so enthusiastic towards Degas and Gates' work that he hired them to provide additional material for Barbarella.

In analyzing Degas and Gates' Goldstrike! script (dated 5 December 1966) compared to the film, Bava biographer Tim Lucas notes that the former includes details not featured onscreen, such as Diabolik being implicated as the mastermind behind the 1963 Great Train Robbery (a reference to Julius No's implied theft of Portrait of the Duke of Wellington in Dr. No), sequences that were staged differently to what was filmed, and lacks scenes that were entirely Bava's invention. Among the differences include the opening heist—which was scripted as concerning an armoured car carrying gold, compared to the film's depiction of a diversion in which cash is transported in a Rolls-Royce accompanied by a police motorcade—a police raid on a casino instead of a discotheque, Eva injuring herself while using an exercycle rather than while helping Diabolik set up a trap, a second conversation between the Minister of Finance and Inspector Ginko being substituted with a televised plea to the public, and Eva visiting Diabolik's gold-encased body in the Hall of Ministry rather than in their hideout. Lucas believes that many of Bava's alterations to the screenplay served to make the characters more sympathetic and believable, and notes that many of the film's wittiest and most memorable moments, such as Diabolik and Eva's lovemaking on top of the stolen $10 million (a parody of Horst Buchholz covering Catherine Spaak's nude body with lira notes in The Empty Canvas) and Valmont's threat to "cross [Dr. Vernier] from the human register", were entirely the director's creation.

Bava was permitted by De Laurentiis to utilize many of the key crew members of several of his most recent films (namely Planet of the Vampires and Kill, Baby, Kill), such as his son and assistant director Lamberto Bava, editor Romana Fortini, cinematographer Antonio Rinaldi, and script supervisor Rosalba Scavia. The film's art direction was led by Flavio Mogherini and two-time Academy Award winner Piero Gherardi: Mogherini, who had last worked with Bava on The Wonders of Aladdin, was also responsible for the film's scale model effects, while Gherardi, who had designed sets for films that Bava had shot early in both men's careers, also assisted Luciana Marinucci with the film's costume designs. Other crew members would also become future Oscar winners: Carlo Rambaldi, who had previously provided special effects for Planet of the Vampires and created Diabolik's form-fitting mask, would be recognized for his work on E.T. the Extra-Terrestrial, as would composer Ennio Morricone for The Hateful Eight.

=== Casting ===
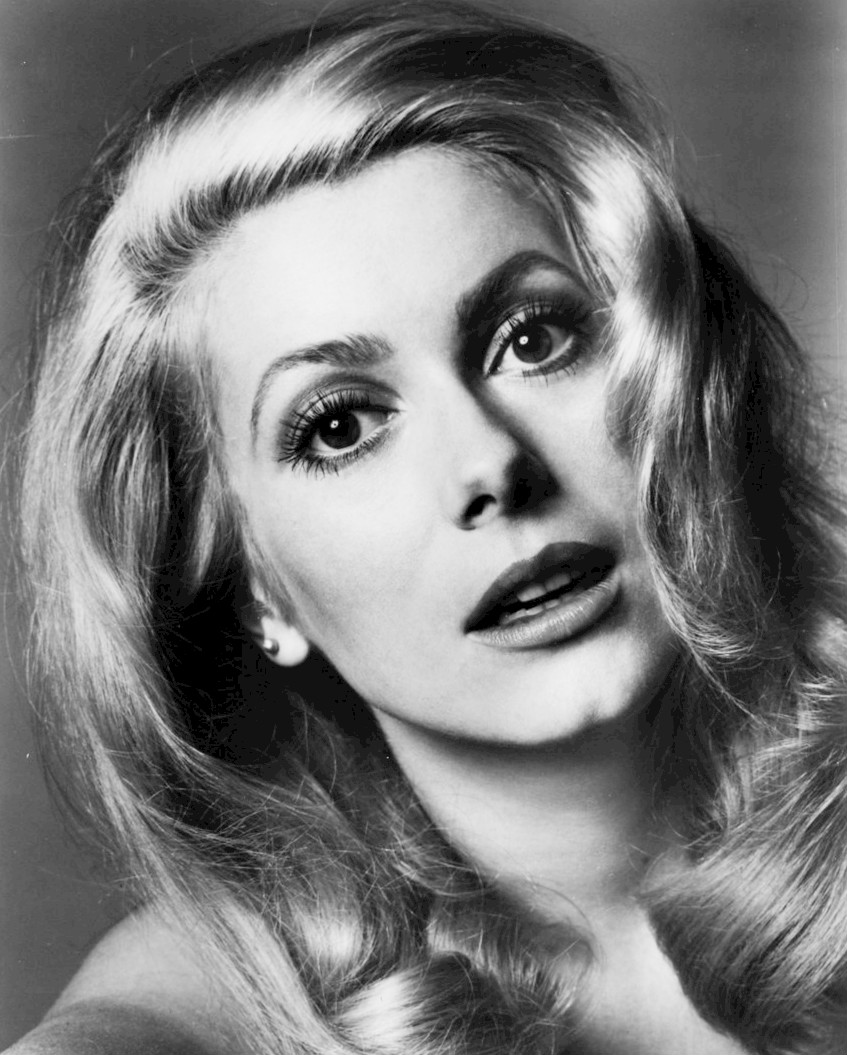
Catherine Deneuve (pictured) was originally cast in the role of Eva Kant, but left the film after a week of shooting and was replaced by Marisa Mell.

John Phillip Law was invited to audition for Diabolik as a favor by De Laurentiis after production on Barbarella, which Law had been cast in as Pygar, was delayed due to technical difficulties, allowing director Roger Vadim and his wife and star, Jane Fonda, to make the "Metzengerstein" segment of Spirits of the Dead. An avid comic book fan since childhood, Law was initially unfamiliar with the characters in Diabolik, and read several of the comics to understand his character, as he had done when preparing for Barbarella. Due to most of the character's face being hidden by a black or white skin-tight mask, Law noted that the most prominent aspect of Diabolik's appearance was his eyebrows; he prepared for the role by applying mascara to his own, and taught himself to convey a wide array of expressions with them. Upon meeting with De Laurentiis and Bava, the director exclaimed "Ah, questo Diabolik!" ("This is Diabolik!"), indicating to Law that he had won the role.

Budgetary changes led to established actors being cast in smaller roles, including Michel Piccoli—who was recommended to De Laurentiis by Vadim—as Ginko, Adolfo Celi as Valmont and Terry-Thomas as the Minister of the Interior (later the Minister of Finance). Because of his busy schedule, which precluded his ability to dub his own performance (in the typical manner of production for Italian films), Terry-Thomas' scenes were shot in a single day and his dialogue was recorded as live sound. Several minor members of the film's cast had appeared in Bava's earlier films, including Federico Boido (Planet of the Vampires), Francesco Mulè (Dr. Goldfoot and the Girl Bombs) and Walter Williams (The Girl Who Knew Too Much). Renzo Palmer, whose character Mr. Hammond usurps Terry-Thomas in the Minister of the Interior role, was also an experienced dubbing actor who had provided voice work for Planet of the Vampires and Knives of the Avenger; for the Italian version of the film, he looped not only his own lines, but those of Terry-Thomas'.

Casting Eva Kant proved particularly troublesome. According to Law, the role was originally going to be played by an unidentified American model who was cast at the behest of her friend, Gulf and Western (the then-parent company of Paramount) President Charles Bluhdorn; Law noted that the model was "gorgeous, but couldn't say 'Hello' on film". Official production documents dated 4 April 1967 note that Laura Devon was eventually cast as Eva, but she was quickly replaced by Catherine Deneuve; Vadim, her ex-fiancé, had recommended Deneuve to De Laurentiis. Law believed that Bava was against this idea, and felt personally that Deneuve was wrong for the role: "There was no chemistry between us. She was very sweet, and a very good actress, but she was simply not right for the part"; he also stated that "Catherine may not have been ready for the part. She had not yet done Belle de Jour. I think if she had done Diabolik after Belle de Jour, she might have been more relaxed, and things might have worked out a little differently." After examining production photographs of Law and Deneuve, Lucas corroborated Law's assessment by noting that the actress was "unable to subdue her own persona to inhabit the character of Eva Kant. Standing beside her clearly enamored co-star in her white vinyl boots and mini-dress, she looks like an Ice Princess to be worshiped—which was not the interpersonal dynamic required between Eva and Diabolik. [...] Her casting would have badly weakened Diabolik's all-important authority and thrown the film completely off-balance." When asked about her involvement in the film in the 1980s, Deneuve revealed that Bava took his frustrations with the film's production and her lack of chemistry with Law out on her, saying, "He didn't seem to find anything about me agreeable, not even the way I walked". After a week of shooting with Deneuve, Bava and De Laurentiis decided that she should be replaced; having objected to the nudity required for the role, she was fired after she refused to perform the scene in which Diabolik and Eva have sex on top of the $10 million they have stolen.

Bava was given the opportunity to recast Eva and selected Tolo, whom he would later cast in Roy Colt & Winchester Jack. De Laurentiis, who had previously cast the actress in Kiss the Girls and Make Them Die and The Witches, disliked Tolo and instead hired Bava's secondary choice, Marisa Mell. Law recalled that upon meeting Mell, "we knew everything was going to work out. We fell into each other's arms on the first day, and had a really great relationship on—and off-screen, after a while." For the duration of the film's production, the two leads lived together, and adopted a stray black kitten, which they christened "Diabolik". With Mell in place as Eva, Law found Bava to be a cooperative, amiable director who allowed them to express vulnerability and create "magic moments" throughout the film. Stylistically, Eva's portrayal in the film notably differs from her fumetti counterpart: in the comics, Eva typically styles her hair in a bun (usually a chignon) and wears trenchcoats or black catsuits similar to those worn by Diabolik; while her film counterpart keeps her hair long (Mell, a brunette, wore a wig to portray the character as a blonde) and undergoes a multitude of retrofuturistic costume changes. (Note: Degas and Gates' draft of the screenplay makes the following suggestion with regards to color symbolism: "In general, all of Diabolik's accoutrements are black, all Eva's—white." While this motif was used during Deneuve's stint in the film's production, it was largely abandoned following the casting of Mell, whose costumes are patterned in a variety of colors, notably orange. The motif was primarily retained for the black and white Jaguar E-Types driven by Diabolik and Eva, respectively.) Following the film's completion, Mell was cast alongside Sorel and Martinelli in Lucio Fulci's giallo One on Top of the Other.

=== Filming ===
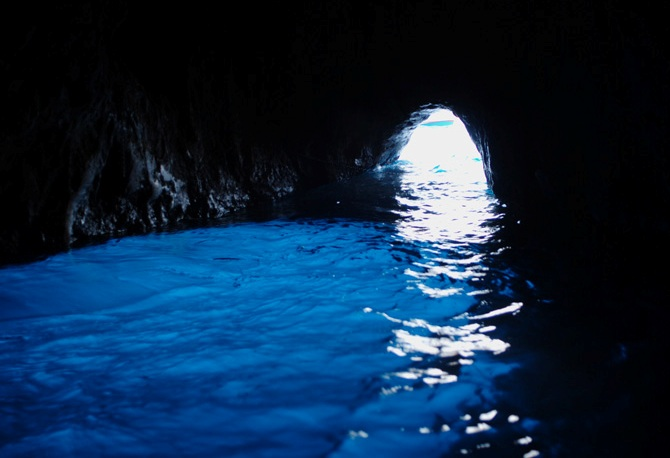
Danger: Diabolik was partially shot on location in the Blue Grotto.

Danger: Diabolik began filming on 11 April 1967 and was shot at Dinocittà, a Fiat plant in Turin, the Blue Grotto in Capri, and on location in Rome and Anzio. In a 1970 interview with Luigi Cozzi, Bava described the filming as "nightmarish", and said that De Laurentiis had him tone down the violent scenes in the film. Law commented that the producer and director had opposite ideas for the film: De Laurentiis wanted to make a family-friendly film with a charming thief in the vein of Raffles, while Bava wanted to make a film that was faithful to the comic books. Lamberto Bava recalled that while his father's relationship with the producer was generally amiable, he was also frustrated by De Laurentiis' frequent absences due to his commitments to other films. Danger: Diabolik finished filming on 18 June 1967. Law stated that shortly after the film's production ended, shooting began on Barbarella. This led to the same sets, such as the set for Valmont's teen discotheque, being used in both films.

Although De Laurentiis set aside 781.25 million lire with which to make the film, the final budget came to only 200 million. Despite their difficult working relationship, De Laurentiis was highly impressed by Bava's efforts, especially by the visual effects, jokingly declaring that he would inform Paramount that the film had gone overbudget, and that a matte painting of the car hangar in Diabolik's lair was actually a set that cost $200,000. He decided that the money saved from the production needed to be used immediately to make a sequel, but Bava refused, later telling Cozzi, "I informed [De Laurentiis] that Diabolik was immobilized, that he was suffering from a permanent disability—that he was dead!". The director would work again for De Laurentiis only twice more: on two episodes of the television miniseries The Odyssey, which he co-directed with Franco Rossi, and on Sergei Bondarchuk's Waterloo, for which he went uncredited for his visual effects work. His recollection of his experiences on Danger: Diabolik led Bava to turn down De Laurentiis' offer to provide special effects for King Kong, recommending Rambaldi instead. Danger: Diabolik would also prove to be the only film Bava would direct for a major Hollywood studio such as Paramount; for the remainder of his career, he would work for independent producers who Lamberto Bava often described as "dodgy".

==== Visual effects ====
Lucas has analyzed Bava's extensive use of visual effects photography in Danger: Diabolik and its implementation of techniques used in his earlier films, albeit to a more flamboyant degree as allowed by the film's budget. With regard to the film's first sequence, shot in an alleyway near Dinocittà, he states that Bava opens the film with "a parade of illusions", most notably the establishing shot of a bank, which utilizes a travelling matte that adds multiple floors to a single-floor structure while duplicating the structure to the opposite side of the screen; to visually lend scale to the matte, toy figurines are used to represent soldiers standing guard on both sides of the structure, while a toy tank is visible in the foreground as a motorcade of police officers on motorcycles ride through the structure's gate in the lower section of the composition—the only part of the set that was actually built. He describes this as "a staggering pre-digital effect, and it's only there not to be noticed".

Aside from this example and Diabolik's car hangar, other instances of Bava's in-camera matte work in the film include the exteriors of the Château de Saint-Just—which were filmed on the beaches of Tor Caldara, where he employed similar effects for Erik the Conqueror, The Whip and the Body, Knives of the Avenger, Five Dolls for an August Moon and Roy Colt & Winchester Jack—Valmont's runway (for which only one wing and a portion of a plane's hull were painted) and the cabin in which Eva is held hostage; although an establishing shot of Valmont's plane flying towards the runway was shot with a specially prepared matte, the sequence was ultimately cut from the finished film. For the sequence in which Diabolik scales the castle wall, a convex section of material was built at a 35 degree angle, allowing Law to "climb" the wall without needing to be doubled by the film's stunt coordinator, Gofreddo "Freddy" Unger (who instead doubled for him during Diabolik's dive into a harbor in the pre-title sequence); the scene was shot with wide-angle lenses to lend a sense of depth and height. The underwater sequences of Diabolik and Eva's recovery of the gold were shot by a second unit supervised by Francisco Baldini; these are interspersed with close-ups of Law and Mell's faces that were filmed "dry" in front of an aquarium.

Lucas is more critical of Bava's uncharacteristic use of optical overlays and chroma key effects, deeming them to be aspects of the production that were likely forced upon him by De Laurentiis: in the scene in which Diabolik and Valmont free-fall from the latter's plane, one of Diabolik's legs appears to be unusually thin, as light from the bluescreen used bounced back onto the trouser leg. He also brings attention to the artificiality of two scenes in particular, one in which Diabolik uses multicolored smoke to distract Ginko and the police as he steals their Rolls-Royce, and another where Diabolik calls Valmont from a phone booth. In the former, the smoke is overlaid in a continuous pattern rather than changing with the editing of the action behind it, while the latter begins with an establishing shot that is too tightly framed on Diabolik to allow the audience to visually adjust to his location, and a zoom onto him in a later shot fails to correspond with the background matte. Lucas, however, notes that this artificiality is also in line with the composition of artwork in comic books. Swamp Thing artist Stephen R. Bissette notes that Bava's framing frequently serves to emulate comic book panels, such as filming action on rear-view mirrors and through bookcases and bed frames; he also considers Bava's use of depth, onscreen action and camera movement to be closer to the intended effect of a comic book upon a reader compared to other contemporary interpretations of the medium such as Barbarella, which Bissette feels placed its focus on combining elaborate costuming and art direction with static framing and action in a misguided attempt to replicate the flatness of the artwork.

For scenes in which characters are dropped out of the trapdoor of Valmont's plane, G.I. Joe action figures were dressed in the style of the characters they were representing and dropped through a miniature recreation of the life-size plane set. Similarly, the shot depicting the destruction of the gold-carrying train used a model bridge with a toy train that was painted to match the engine depicted in the preceding sequences; a matte containing airbrushed clouds was used to mask the illusion. Although filmed with high-speed cameras, the on-set explosion of the bridge was deemed unsatisfactory, and was accented in post-production with an overlaid, animated explosion.

=== Music ===
Morricone's score for Danger: Diabolik, which was conducted by Bruno Nicolai, was the composer's only collaboration with Bava, and was influenced by his work with the avant-garde/free improvisation collective Gruppo di Improvvisazione Nuova Consonanza. It includes a title song, "Deep Down", featuring vocals by singer and actress Maria Cristina "Christy" Brancucci—whose other collaborations with Morricone include "Run, Man, Run" in The Big Gundown and "Man for Me" in O.K. Connery—which appears throughout the film in a variety of arrangements. It is primarily used to communicate Eva's love for Diabolik, which is furthered by Alessandro Alessandroni's playing of a sitar during the bridge. A "chase theme" frequently used in action scenes prominently features a double-tracked electric guitar motif, also performed by Alessandroni, that bears similarity to that featured in Neal Hefti's "Batman Theme". Among the film's most experimental cues include the psychedelic discotheque theme, which utilizes "wall of sound" reverb to enhance (at alternating points) a vocal chorus and a brass section providing the melody over a rhythm section consisting of a fuzz guitar and drum kit, and the identikit theme, which includes an improvised performance on an atonal keyboard by Nicolai. Lucas deems the highlight of the score to be the cue featured when Diabolik and Eva recover the gold, beginning with a solo melisma performed by Edda Dell'Orso, which is replaced by a vocal chorus performed by Alessandroni's I Cantori Moderni choir and later by a rock band accompaniment that "feels closely allied to Morricone's Spaghetti Western work while also feeling perfectly at home in an espionage milieu".

Although an Italian-language version of "Deep Down" was released by Parade as a 45 RPM single, the original score has never seen a full, authorized release, as the original master tapes were destroyed in the 1970s by a warehouse fire. This has resulted in several unauthorized reconstructions of the score being released on CD, the most widely distributed of which is a version attributed to Pallottola Foro, which also includes dialogue extracts from the film. In the March 2002 issue of GQ's list of the "Top 10 Movie Soundtracks of All Time", Morricone's score was ranked third.

== Release ==
Danger: Diabolik's release was highly anticipated in Italy, and this led to De Laurentiis threatening to sue producers of films whose titles were similar to his, such as Superargo Versus Diabolicus and Arriva Dorellik. Danger: Diabolik was submitted to the Italian Board of Censors in December 1967 and, after five brief cuts were made to the film, it was released in Italy on 24 January 1968. The film was described by film historian Roberto Curti as a "financial disappointment for De Laurentiis". It grossed 265 million Italian lire between January and July 1968 with a total of 715 million lire by the end of its theatrical run. It opened in Paris in April 1968 under the title Danger Diabolik.

In the United States, Danger: Diabolik was first released in August 1968, and opened in New York in December that year. The film played in major cinemas during its first run, initially on a double bill with 5 Card Stud, followed by later showings that paired it with either its sister production Barbarella or other Paramount films, including Rosemary's Baby, Riot and Waterhole #3; although primarily considered to be a supporting feature by Paramount, in some areas of the country it was promoted to A-movie status due to positive word of mouth. As bookings decreased, it was relegated to supporting exploitation films at grindhouses and drive-ins, such as The Incredibly Strange Creatures Who Stopped Living and Became Mixed-Up Zombies and Blood Rites, before falling into obscurity. In the United Kingdom, Danger: Diabolik's release was delayed until 19 January 1969 and was shown in a version that was reportedly cut by 17 minutes compared to the original prints. Paramount's English-language trailers for the film were narrated by Telly Savalas, who would later star in Bava's Lisa and the Devil.

=== Home media and television ===
Two English-language dubs of Danger: Diabolik were produced, both featuring the voices of Law, Mell and Terry-Thomas. The original English version, used for the film's theatrical, DVD and Blu-ray releases, presented the remaining cast dubbed with predominantly British accents, and included the voices of Dan Sturkie and Bernard Grant as Ginko and Valmont respectively. The second version, used for the film's VHS and LaserDisc releases, was created when the original sound elements for the dubbed version (aside from those of the three aforementioned performers) were believed to be lost; the non-English-speaking actors were dubbed with predominantly American accents, and Richard Johnson is reported to be among the voice actors for this version. This version also greatly remixed the audio levels for the sound effects and music, and dropped the Danger: from the original English version's title due to using an Italian print. Lucas considers the vocal performances of the second version to be inferior to the original, particularly deeming the performances of Piccoli, Celi, Lucia Modugno and Annie Gorassini to be negatively impacted by their newer dubbers.

Footage from the film was extensively featured in the music video for the Fatboy Slim remix of "Body Movin' " by the American hip-hop group Beastie Boys. This footage is interspersed with new material, created using many of the same techniques as Bava's film, depicting Diabolik (portrayed by Ad-Rock) humorously attempting to steal a fondue recipe from a villain (Adam Yauch) and his butler (Mike D). Yauch, who also directed the video under his alias "Nathanial Hörnblowér", described the film as "campy in a way, but not in a bad way" and found the acting and direction to be "ridiculous" but with the set design being "so over the top the acting is appropriate"; he believed that the film's appeal lay in its depiction of Diabolik as a criminal, in contrast to the superheroes of most comic book film adaptations.

The second English version was featured on the Sci-Fi Channel incarnation of Mystery Science Theater 3000 (MST3K), a series which provides mocking commentary over B-movies interspersed with sketches, which aired on 8 August 1999 as the thirteenth and final episode of the show's tenth season and (up until 2017) the final episode of the series overall. Lucas has criticized the show's selection and handling of the film, stating "The fact that such an accomplished film would be singled out for insult and lampoon on the program showed that it was running out of appropriate fodder."

Danger: Diabolik was released on DVD by Paramount Home Entertainment on 14 June 2005; this release was produced by Kim Aubry of American Zoetrope, who was responsible for recovering the audio masters for the original English version. The DVD's special features include an audio commentary featuring Law and Lucas, the "Body Movin'" music video (featuring an optional audio commentary with Yauch), and Danger: Diabolik – From Fumetti to Film, an appreciation of the film featuring Bissette, Law, De Laurentiis, Morricone, Yauch, and filmmaker Roman Coppola. Reviews of the disc by Cinefantastique and Video Librarian praised the release, noting the high quality of the digital transfer and special features. This DVD is now out of print.

Shout Factory released the MST3K version of the film as part of the 39th volume of its DVD releases of the series on 21 November 2017; the company released the original film on Blu-ray in the U.S. on 19 May 2020. This release includes all of the special features from Paramount's DVD, as well as a new audio commentary with film historians Troy Howarth and Nathaniel Thompson. A Blu-ray for the Australian market, distributed by Via Vision Entertainment under their Imprint Films division, was released on 28 October 2020. Packaged in a limited edition slipcase, this release includes the DVD's special features, alongside a re-recorded commentary with Lucas and an exclusive video essay by critic and historian Kat Ellinger. It was released on 4K Ultra HD (and a new version of the Blu-ray) by Kino Lorber on 22 July 2025 with all prior special features.

== Reception ==
=== Contemporary ===
Upon its initial release, Howard Thompson of The New York Times called Danger: Diabolik "infantile junk". Variety was also negative, calling it a "dull Dino De Laurentiis programmer" whose "[b]izarre sets, poor process work, static writing and limp direction spell pure formula fare for lowercase grind bookings." A more favorable review came from Roger Ebert of the Chicago Sun-Times, who gave it a two-and-a-half star rating out of four, stating that although he felt that the film was "long and eventually loses track of itself", he deemed it to be "very nearly the movie Barbarella should have been" due to "look[ing] better put-together (although its budget must have been smaller)", noting Bava's "thorough grounding in schlock exploitation films" and praising his use of clichés. He also found Piccoli's casting as Ginko to be "nothing short of hilarious". In Britain, a review came from David Hutchison for the April 1969 issue of Films and Filming, who deemed the film's use of spy-fi tropes to be outdated, but made a point that "the comic strip has a great many affinities with the motion picture; both are a series of separate pictures and take the same advantage of light, shade, colour and perspective. Bava is obviously well aware of this and the result is a film strip cartoon which, despite its faults, is generally more successful than either Modesty Blaise or Barbarella in capturing an elusive comic strip flavour".

Betty Marcus of Fort Lauderdale News was enthusiastic, describing the film as "pure entertainment", noting that "it brings back the excitement and gimmickry of the Bond films and the high-camp corn of the Batman television series" and finding the visual effects to be "magnificent". In Australia, a review in the 6 September 1968 edition of The Age called the film "a real surprise, splendid stuff"; aside from noting the influence of Fantômas and Raffles, it defined the film in the context of Bava's filmography as cinematographer and director, stating that "Danger: Diabolik demonstrates [Bava's] graphic eye for an image, his fluid camera style and arresting way with colour composition", and that "Although pictures by Bava have been pouring out of Italy for years, I can recall only one or two here - no horror of course, because this genre, which allows him greater scope, is still banned in Australia". The Monthly Film Bulletin also gave the film a positive review, noting that: "Bava's superb visual sense stands him in good stead in this comic-strip adventure which looks like a brilliant pastiche of the best of everything in anything from James Bond to Matt Helm." In his 1970 reference book Science Fiction in the Cinema, John Baxter declared that "Judex is alive and living at Cinecittà", praising Bava as a "brilliant cinematographer and one of Italy's finest fantasy film-makers" who gives the film "the visual pace of a streamlined juggernaut", and applauded Law's "dazzling characterization".

=== Retrospective ===
[Danger: Diabolik] is more than just an inspired adaptation of the Giussani Sisters' fumetti, a fact that only becomes apparent when one realizes that the original comics stories were published in black-and-white. Diabolik defines the correct color template for this black-and-white character, much as Bava redefined the way horror films were photographed in color earlier in the decade. It's not a colorful study in fright and superstition—the sort of film one associates with Bava—but neither is it an impersonal work; on the contrary, the more one is aware of Bava's total control over the film's design, and the abundance of camouflage and trickery that went into its making, Diabolik reveals itself to be every bit as personal as [Hercules in the Haunted World] or [Planet of the Vampires], if not quite so autonomous a creation.

— Tim Lucas

Danger: Diabolik's status as a cult film gradually grew as studies of Bava's career began, and was explored in the DVD featurette From Fumetti to Film, which drew attention to the film's relation to its comic book roots. According to Lucas, the film was generally well received by contemporary critics and audiences who viewed it in the context of its pop art aesthetic, but it was disregarded as "not only artificial, but frivolous" by the counterculture of the time due to their preference for the realism in New Hollywood films such as Midnight Cowboy, The Wild Bunch and Woodstock. He states that its popular reception evolved from being seen as "quaintly campy" in the 1970s, "interesting" in the 1980s, to "fashionable" in the 1990s due to its VHS and LaserDisc release—the result of a successful letter-writing campaign among fans directed at a hesitant Paramount Home Video—coinciding with new trends in lounge music, style and fashion.

In a 2012 issue of Film International, John Berra similarly noted that the film had initially "been left to languish in obscurity since its staggered international release at the end of the 1960s" and that it "mostly existed as a kitsch reference point or as an easy target for tongue-in-cheek parody", citing both its MST3K episode and the "Body Movin'" music video as examples. Berra described the film as being "warmly received" by the internet community, who routinely embraces comic book adaptations and seeks to adopt films that have been neglected by popular audiences. Lucas identifies the "uncomplicated magnetism" of Law and Mell's onscreen sexual chemistry as one of the primary factors of the film's cult following. Similarly, Kat Ellinger believes that both Danger: Diabolik and Barbarella reflect trends of the sexual revolution, presenting a morally ambiguous worldview that stands in contrast to most 21st century comic book film adaptations such as the Marvel Cinematic Universe, which she described as largely "masculine and asexual". This is seen not only in its characterization of Diabolik and Eva, especially the similarity of the latter's role to the assertive female characters frequently seen in Bava's other films, but also in the film's production and costume design. She particularly notes a circular motif in Mogherini's art direction, such as the dial on Diabolik's safe (which bares some resemblance to a woman's breast), Diabolik and Eva's bed—"a giant circular statement that invites an orgy of at least ten"—and their swimming pool.

Video Librarian noted that the film was "guaranteed to delight viewers whose tastes run to the outré", praising Morricone's score, Law and Mell's acting, and noting that the "real star is Bava" stating that "the film is colorful almost to the point of garishness". Cinefantastique also discussed the film's visuals, noting that: "[Bava's] color rich, brilliantly artificial-looking compositions were the cinematic equivalent of comic book art even before he tackled the form." The magazine also found that the special effects rivalled those of Bond series veteran Ken Adam. The review also praised Law's work in the film noting his "amazingly expressive eyebrows" and declared the film as "1960s pop-culture heaven." Ignatiy Vishnevetsky of The A.V. Club compared the film to Barbarella, opining that Diabolik had "a sense of infectious, amoral fun" which Barbarella lacks. He declared the film to be among "the definitive touchstones of Euro pulp." Empire included the film on its list of the top 500 greatest films. They described the movie as "thin as a poster, but still amazing cinema—a succession of striking, kinetic, sexy, absurd images accompanied by a one-of-a-kind Ennio Morricone score that revels in its casual anarchy."

Jim Vorel ranked the film's MST3K episode at number 75 out of 191, calling the series' ending "a fairly satisfying conclusion" and found the film to be "entertaining enough ... it's hard not to appreciate the Technicolor splendor and absurd costuming." Writing for The Nerdist, Kyle Anderson praised both the film and its MST3K episode, describing the former as "boast[ing] some truly psychedelic visuals and impressive action sequences to boot" and the latter as "one of the strongest riffs of the Sci-Fi years."

In later years, Law expressed pride in having been involved in the film. Describing his view on its re-evaluation and fandom, he noted that he read "a book about science fiction movies and seeing a mention of Barbarella and Danger: Diabolik. The author said that Barbarella was okay, but that Danger: Diabolik was the masterpiece. I was amazed because, for some years, I'd thought it was probably the other way around. But as time goes on, you know, I can see what he meant. I think Diabolik probably is the masterpiece."

== Legacy and influence ==
Danger: Diabolik and Barbarella were part of a minor trend of film adaptations of European comics that emphasized mild sadomasochism and late 1960s fetish gear; aside from these two films, 1968 saw the release of Piero Vivarelli's similarly themed Satanik. These were followed by Bruno Corbucci's Ms. Stiletto (1969) and Corrado Farina's Baba Yaga (1973). The production and costume design of both films also reflected a larger movement of retrofuturism seen in European genre films of the 1960s and 1970s. These include Pasquale Festa Campanile's The Libertine and Check to the Queen (both of which were designed by Mogherini), Umberto Lenzi's So Sweet... So Perverse, Tinto Brass' Col cuore in gola, Fulci's One on Top of the Other and A Lizard in a Woman's Skin, Elio Petri's The 10th Victim, Piero Schivazappa's The Laughing Woman and Radley Metzger's Camille 2000 and The Lickerish Quartet. The look of Diabolik in the film influenced his depiction in the fumetti: because the film's audiences could see Diabolik's mouth due to Law's mask being made out of latex, the series' artists, Enzo Facciolo and Sergio Zaniboni, gave up on trying to shade in his mouth, and simply outlined it.

Along with Barbarella, Danger: Diabolik is one of several genre films that is referenced in Roman Coppola's film CQ, which explicitly pays tribute to several scenes in the film, such as Eva's showering and her lovemaking with Diabolik on top of money; Law also appears in the film in a supporting role. British director Edgar Wright similarly cited it as an influence on his film Scott Pilgrim vs. the World, describing Danger: Diabolik as an "Italian influence, a sense of completely unbridled imagination. They don't make any attempt to make it look realistic. Mario Bava's composition and staging has a real try-anything attitude."

=== Further films, TV series and radio dramas ===
In 1991, Rai 2 announced a live-action TV series based on Diabolik, which was to be produced by M Films Produzione and directed by Rospo Pallenberg. Although a 100-minute pilot episode was planned, the series did not come to pass. In autumn 1999, the French television network M6 began airing a 40-episode animated series, Saban's Diabolik, an American-French-Italian-Japanese co-production between Saban Entertainment, M6, Mediaset, Toho and Ashi Productions. The series was influenced by the critical and commercial success of Batman: The Animated Series, and reworked its characters for a younger audience. It follows Diabolik and Eva as they commit heists to expose the atrocities of Diabolik's adoptive brother Dane, who has taken over their father's organization The Brotherhood, all while avoiding being captured by Ginko. The English dub of the series was initially set to air on Fox Family Channel in the United States in 2000, but was cancelled before being aired, although the series was broadcast in Australia.

In 2000, Radio Monte Carlo produced a radio drama adaptation of several of the original fumetti stories from Diabolik. The series was broadcast on Rai Radio 2, and aired for 20 episodes on weekdays from 13 November to 8 December. Adapted by Armando Traverso, directed by Arturo Villone and featuring original music by Giovanni Lodigiani, the series featured the voices of Luca Ward as Diabolik, Roberta Greganti as Eva and Luca Biagini as Ginko.

In the early 2000s, a new film based on Diabolik, directed by Christophe Gans and starring Mark Dacascos and Monica Bellucci, was in development. Gans opined that "The Bava film is unique and I'd never, ever want to copy it. But let's see where we can take Diabolik today for a totally new and different Pop art experience." The film did not go into production. In 2002, screenwriter and Diabolik historian Mario Gomboli announced that a French production of Diabolik was to be made with a contemporary setting from a script written by Carlo Lucarelli and Giampiero Rigosi. The script was completed in April 2007, with filming set to begin in January 2008, but the production stalled. In 2012, Sky Group, in conjunction with Sky France and Sky Italia, produced a teaser trailer for a second proposed live-action TV series based on Diabolik, but the series did not enter production.

In December 2018, Rai Cinema president Paolo del Brocco announced that a new adaptation of Diabolik was in development, with the Manetti Bros. directing and co-writing the screenplay with Michelangelo La Neve and Gomboli. The cast includes Luca Marinelli as Diabolik, Miriam Leone as Eva, Valerio Mastandrea as Ginko, in addition to Serena Rossi, Alessandro Roja and Claudia Gerini. The film was originally set to be released in Italy by 01 Distribution on 31 December 2020, but was then pushed back to 16 December 2021, due to the second wave of the COVID-19 pandemic in Italy. In April 2021, two sequels to the film were announced, which are scheduled to begin back-to-back production in October.

== See also ==
- List of films based on comics
- List of Italian films of 1968
- List of French films of 1968
- List of Mystery Science Theater 3000 episodes
- Terry-Thomas on screen, radio, stage and record

== Bibliography ==
- Berra, John (October 2012). "Deep, Deep, Down: The social satire of Mario Bava's Danger: Diabolik". Film International. 10 (4–5): 45. doi:10.1386/fint.10.4-5.44_1. ISSN 1651-6826.
- Celli, Carlo; Cottino-Jones, Marga (2007). A New Guide to Italian Cinema. New York: Palgrave Macmillan. ISBN 978-1-4039-7560-7.
- Curti, Roberto (2016). Diabolika: Supercriminals, Superheroes and the Comic Book Universe in Italian Cinema. Midnight Marquee Press. ISBN 978-1-936168-60-6.
- Curti, Roberto (2026). "The Movie That Lived Twice: Mario Bava's Danger: Diabolik". Danger: Diabolik. Eureka! Home Video (Media notes). United Kingdom. EKA70621.
- Hughes, Howard (2011). Cinema Italiano: The Complete Guide from Classics to Cult. London: I.B. Tauris. ISBN 978-1-84885-607-3.
- Krafsur, Richard P., ed. (1976). The American Film Institute Catalog: Feature Films, 1961–1970. New York: R. R. Bowker. ISBN 978-0-8352-0440-8.
- Kuersten, Erich (19 October 2005). "Danger: Diabolik (1968)". PopMatters. Archived from the original on 7 January 2021.
- Lucas, Tim (2007). Mario Bava: All the Colors of the Dark. Video Watchdog. ISBN 978-0-9633756-1-2.
- Newman, Kim (2011). Nightmare Movies: Horror on Screen Since the 1960s. London: Bloomsbury. ISBN 978-1-4088-0503-9.
- Reiss, Shelley R., ed. (2013). Reading Mystery Science Theater 3000: Critical Approaches. Scarecrow Press. ISBN 978-0-8108-9141-8.
- Willis, Donald, ed. (1985). Variety's Complete Science Fiction Reviews. Garland Publishing. ISBN 978-0-8240-6263-7.
- Hunt, Leon (2018). Danger: Diabolik. Columbia University Press. ISBN 9780231851121.
