= Workers' Playtime (radio programme) =

- Genre: Variety show
- Running time: 30 minutes
- Country of origin: United Kingdom
- Language: English
- Home station: BBC Home Service; BBC Forces Programme; BBC Light Programme
- Produced by: Bill Gates
- Original release: 31 May 1941 – 6 October 1964
- Audio format: Mono

Workers' Playtime is a British radio variety programme transmitted by the BBC between 1941 and 1964. Originally intended as a morale-booster for industrial workers in Britain during World War II, the programme was broadcast at lunchtime, three times a week, live from a factory canteen "somewhere in Britain". Presenter and former music hall artist Margery Manners used her experience of getting sailors to sing along with her choruses to cheer workers and listeners.

Initially, the show was broadcast simultaneously on both the BBC Home Service and Forces Programme, then from 1957 onwards solely on the Light Programme. For all its 23 years each show concluded with the words from the show's producer, Bill Gates: "Good luck, all workers!"

The programme had the support of the government because the shows were seen as supporting the war effort on the home front. Workers' Playtime was a touring show, with the Ministry of Labour choosing which factory canteens it would visit.

Throughout World War II, Ernest Bevin, the Minister of Labour and National Service, would appear on these shows from time to time to congratulate the workers and exhort them to greater efforts. When the war ended it was realised that the show had worked, which meant that Ernest Bevin wanted Workers' Playtime to continue to raise the morale of the workers, whilst the government rebuilt Britain and the British economy. The BBC, for its part, was very happy to continue with a show which had proved a national success even if it did mean transporting crew, cable, microphones, two pianos, a producer, two pianists and a group of variety artists up and down the country three times a week.

== Artists ==
Many famous variety, vocal and comedy artists appeared over the years, such as Charlie Chester, Bob and Alf Pearson, Peter Sellers, Tony Hancock, Frankie Howerd, Terry-Thomas, Anne Shelton, Betty Driver, Eve Boswell, Dorothy Squires, Arthur English, Julie Andrews, Morecambe and Wise, Peter Cavanagh, comedian George Martin, Janet Brown, Roy Hudd, comedian Michael Howard, harmonica player Paul Templar, The Stargazers, Bob Monkhouse, impressionist Peter Goodwright, Percy Edwards, Ken Dodd, Ken Platt, Gert and Daisy (Elsie and Doris Waters) and many more. Regular musicians included James Moody (piano), Bert Weedon (guitar) and Max Abrams (drums). A selection of original recordings from the show can be heard on the audiobook CD Workers' Playtime published by CD41 in 2008.

== See also ==
- Music While You Work
- Variety Bandbox
