= A Class by Himself =

- Genre: Comedy
- Starring: John Le Mesurier; Peter Butterworth; Richard Stilgoe; Seretta Wilson
- Country of origin: United Kingdom
- Original language: English
- No. of series: 1

Production
- Production company: HTV

Original release
- Network: ITV
- Release: 14 January 1971 – 18 October 1972

A Class by Himself is a British sitcom that aired from 1971 to 1972. The half-hour series was made by HTV and starred John Le Mesurier as Lord Bleasham.

== Cast ==
- John Le Mesurier - Lord Bleasham
- Seretta Wilson - Joanna Bleasham
- Richard Stilgoe - Barneby Locke
- Peter Butterworth - Clutton

== Episodes ==
=== Pilot (1971) ===
- The Thumbe of Barneby Locke (14 January 1971)

=== Series 1 (1972) ===
- A Rolls Is a Rolls Is a Rolls (13 September 1972)
- The Bleasham Memoirs (20 September 1972)
- Restoration Comedy (27 September 1972)
- Guess Who's Coming to Lunch (4 October 1972)
- The Servant Problem (11 October 1972)
- The Bath Chap (18 October 1972)

=== Archive status ===
As of January 2023, the pilot and five out of six episodes are missing with no known copies surviving. Only the first episode, A Rolls Is a Rolls Is a Rolls remains in the archives.
