= Peter Cavanagh (impressionist) =

- Born: Peter Cedric Coates; 31 October 1914; Croydon, Surrey, England
- Died: 18 February 1981 (aged 66); Chipping Norton, Oxfordshire, England
- Occupation: Impressionist
- Years active: 1940s–1970s

Peter Cavanagh (born Peter Cedric Coates; 31 October 1914 – 18 February 1981) was an English comic impressionist, popular on BBC radio in the 1940s and 1950s when he was known as "The Voice of Them All".

== Biography ==
Born in Croydon, Cavanagh started work in the motor trade and then for an electrical manufacturer, before training at the Guildhall School of Music with the aim of becoming a concert singer. During the Second World War, he was attached to the Royal Army Medical Corps, and sometimes acted as compere at shows. He started mimicking radio personalities, such as the imaginary children impersonated by Harry Hemsley, and developed a special talent for impersonating Field Marshal Montgomery - whom he resembled physically - and Winston Churchill.

He started making regular radio appearances on Variety Bandbox in 1945, and became widely known for his ability to make rapid changes between the voices of those he was impersonating, such as the entire cast of ITMA. Particularly impressive was his impersonation of Tommy Handley, and Cavanagh later performed as Handley in the radio biography The Tommy Handley Story. In 1948 he starred with ventriloquist Peter Brough in Two's a Crowd, a radio show set on board an imaginary cruise ship in which he and Brough would impersonate film and theatre stars.

He appeared in the 1949 Royal Variety Performance. He continued to make regular radio appearances through the 1950s, and performed impressions of many personalities of the period, including Gilbert Harding, Robb Wilton, the Duke of Edinburgh, and Eamonn Andrews. One of his specialities was to perform alternate lines of a sketch with the person he was imitating – such as Arthur Askey – and challenge the audience to guess which was the impersonator and which was the person being mimicked. He would end his shows by quickly reprising, one after another, impressions of all those he had impersonated, ending with "...and this is the voice of them all, Peter Cavanagh..".

Cavanagh also made theatre appearances, accompanied by his wife on piano. He made few television appearances, but had a short BBC series in 1955 in which he demonstrated the art of mimicry. By the 1960s, he had effectively been superseded as a performer by younger impressionists such as Mike Yarwood and Peter Goodwright, but occasionally appeared on children's television programmes. In the 1970s he was a panellist on the radio show The Impressionists, and appeared in nostalgic programmes such as Sounds Familiar.

He died in Chipping Norton, Oxfordshire, in 1981, aged 66.
