= A Sweet Old Fashioned Girl =

Single by Teresa Brewer
- B-side: "Goodbye, John"
- Released: April 1956
- Genre: Pop
- Length: 2:52
- Label: Coral
- Songwriter(s): Bob Merrill
- Producer(s): Dick Jacobs

Teresa Brewer singles chronology
"A Tear Fell" / "Bo Weevil" (1956)	"A Sweet Old Fashioned Girl" (1956)	"Mutual Admiration Society" (1956)

"A Sweet Old Fashioned Girl" is a song written by Bob Merrill. The song was produced by Dick Jacobs, and performed by Teresa Brewer. It reached #3 in the UK and #7 in the U.S. in 1956. The song was ranked #46 on Billboard magazine's Top 50 singles of 1956.

== Other versions ==
- Billie Anthony and Eric Jupp and His Orchestra released a version of the song as a single in 1956, but it did not chart.
- Terry-Thomas with His Rock 'N' Roll Rotters released a version of the song entitled "A Sweet Old-Fashioned Boy" as a single in 1956, but it did not chart.
