= Those Kids =

1956 British TV comedy series

Those Kids was a British television series which aired in 1956. It was a comedy programme produced by ABC Weekend TV. The series was wiped, and none of the 17 episodes are known to still exist. Little else is known about the series. Cast included Peter Butterworth, Lynn Grant, George Howell and Sandra Walden.
