= Peter Butterworth =

English actor and comedian (1915–1979)

- Butterworth in Carry On Up the Khyber, 1968
- Born: William Shorrocks Butterworth; 4 February 1915; Bramhall, Cheshire, England
- Died: 17 January 1979 (aged 63); Coventry, West Midlands, England
- Resting place: Danehill Cemetery, Danehill, East Sussex, England
- Occupations: Actor, comedian, Royal Naval Pilot
- Years active: 1948–1979
- Spouse: Janet Brown (m. 1946)
- Children: 2, including Tyler Butterworth

Peter William Shorrocks Butterworth (4 February 1915 – 17 January 1979) was a British actor and comedian best known for his appearances in the Carry On film series and as the Meddling Monk in Doctor Who. He was also a regular on children's television and radio.

Butterworth was married to actress and impressionist Janet Brown.

== Early life ==
William Shorrocks Butterworth (known as Peter) was born on 4 February 1915, in Bramhall, Cheshire.

== War service ==
Butterworth served as a lieutenant in the Fleet Air Arm of the Royal Navy during the Second World War. On 21 June 1940 while serving with 826 Naval Air Squadron, Butterworth was shot down during an attack against a German-occupied seaplane air base on Texel in the Netherlands. Two Fairey Albacores were brought down by Messerschmitt Bf 109s over the Wadden Sea. Four were killed; Butterworth and his air gunner became POWs.

Butterworth was sent to Stalag Luft III near Sagan in Poland. It was there he met Talbot Rothwell, who later went on to write many of the Carry On films in which Butterworth was to star. Having never performed in public before his imprisonment, Butterworth formed a duo with Rothwell and sang in the camp shows. They delivered a song which Rothwell called "The Letter Edged In Black". The performance was followed by some comic repartee which, according to Butterworth's account, provoked enough boos and hisses to have the desired effect of drowning out the sounds of an escape tunnel being dug by other prisoners. After the war, Butterworth kept a photo of the concert party line-up, something which offered inspiration to him when starting a career in acting.

Butterworth was one of the vaulters covering for the escapees portrayed by the book and film The Wooden Horse. Butterworth later auditioned for the film in 1949 but "didn't look convincingly heroic or athletic enough" according to the makers of the film. Within the same camp as Butterworth and Rothwell were the future actors Rupert Davies and John Casson, the son of Lewis Casson and Sybil Thorndike. All four remained very close friends after the war ended and they all appeared on This Is Your Life when Butterworth was a subject of the programme in 1975.

Following the release of archived documents from Germany in February 2024, the BBC News website reported a fuller picture of Butterworth's wartime escapades having interviewed his son, Tyler, for the article.

== Acting career ==
Butterworth came to notice after appearing in pantomime around the UK. His first film appearance was in the Val Guest film William Comes to Town (1948). Guest and Butterworth became close friends and the two worked on a further seven films together during their careers. His first major success was on television in the Terry-Thomas sketch show How Do You View? in which he played the chauffeur "Lockitt". His wife, Janet Brown, was also a cast member. Butterworth also presented successful programmes aimed at children in the 1950s including Saturday Special and Butterworth Time. Saturday Special, which Butterworth co-presented with the puppet Porterhouse the Parrot, was broadcast fortnightly on Saturdays at 5:00 pm in two series from 1951 to 1953, alternating with Whirligig.

He continued to take minor parts in films and went on to appear alongside actors including Sean Connery, David Niven and Douglas Fairbanks Jr during his career.

Around the time his work in the Carry On films began, he guest appeared in two First Doctor Doctor Who stories in 1965 and 1966, The Time Meddler and The Daleks' Master Plan, playing the Meddling Monk.

== Carry On ==
Butterworth's association with the Carry On films began midway through the series with Carry On Cowboy (1965), playing the part of "Doc". He was put in touch with the creator of the series, Peter Rogers, by his friend Talbot Rothwell, the writer of Carry On Cowboy and who had written the previous four films. Out of the actors who were considered to be the Carry On team, he was the sixth most prolific performer in the series, making sixteen film appearances, two Christmas specials, the television series in 1975 and the west end theatre productions which also toured the country, alongside Sid James, Barbara Windsor and Kenneth Connor.

His Carry On appearances portrayed his characters as typically quiet and subtly eccentric. He was often cast as a stooge for another character. Thus, in Carry On Screaming! he played Detective Constable Slobotham, the assistant for Detective Sergeant Bung (Harry H. Corbett); while in Don't Lose Your Head he played Citizen Bidet, the assistant to Citizen Camembert (Kenneth Williams). In Carry On Camping he played Joshua Fiddler, the laid-back and eccentric camp site manager, who persuades Sid James's character to part with most of his money when booking into the camp site. Such was his loyalty to Peter Rogers and Gerald Thomas that Butterworth agreed to play three small roles in Carry On Again Doctor, Carry On Loving and Carry On Henry. He was unable to take larger parts due to other work and stage commitments, but these minor roles were specially written into the films for him.

Butterworth returned to playing more substantial parts within the Carry On films with Carry On Abroad (1972), in which he played 'Pepe' the manager of an unfinished hotel with his nagging wife (Hattie Jacques). Butterworth remained with the series until the final film in the main series, Carry On Emmannuelle (1978).

== Later career ==
Having appeared in many of Val Guest's films during the beginning of his career, he also made three appearances in the films of Richard Lester. He appeared in Lester's film version of A Funny Thing Happened on the Way to the Forum (1966). A decade later, he appeared consecutively in The Ritz and Robin and Marian (both 1976) alongside Sean Connery, Richard Harris and Audrey Hepburn. He had an uncredited cameo part in the film version of the musical Oliver! (1968) as a shopkeeper in court, and made a special appearance in an episode of Catweazle ("The Demi Devil" [1970]) and the Dad's Army episode "The Face on the Poster" (1975).

In 1975 he was the subject of an episode of This Is Your Life whereby Eamonn Andrews surprised him while he was shopping in Selfridges, London. Friends who took part in the show included Terry Scott, Talbot Rothwell, Jimmy Jewel, John Casson and Rupert Davies. Butterworth's wife and their two children, Tyler and Emma were also at the recording. When the Carry on films finished in 1978, Butterworth began to concentrate on straight roles, taking a small part in the feature film The First Great Train Robbery with Sean Connery, and the Alan Bennett play "Afternoon Off" (both 1979). These two productions were shown posthumously.

== Personal life ==
Butterworth was introduced to actress and impressionist Janet Brown by Rothwell and the two married in 1946 at St Mary's, Bryanston Square, Marylebone. Brown later became known for her television impersonations of Margaret Thatcher during the 1970s and 1980s. They had two children: Their son, Tyler Butterworth, also became an actor and is married to the actress Janet Dibley. Their daughter, Emma, was born in 1962. She died in 1996 aged 34.

== Death ==
In 1979, whilst The First Great Train Robbery was on general release, Butterworth was starring as Widow Twankey in the pantomime Aladdin at the Coventry Theatre. When the show had finished, he went back to his hotel following the evening's performance. His failure to return for the following day's matinee show caused alarm, and he was found dead in his room from a heart attack.

Butterworth was buried in Danehill Cemetery, in East Sussex. Following his death, the producer of the Carry On films, Peter Rogers, said that Butterworth was "a thoroughly nice bloke and a dear friend".

== Filmography ==
- William Comes to Town (1948) – Postman
- Murder at the Windmill a.k.a. Mystery at the Burlesque (1949) – Police Constable
- Miss Pilgrim's Progress (1949) – Jonathan
- The Adventures of Jane (1949) – Drunken Man
- The Body Said No! (1950) – Driver
- Night and the City (1950) – Thug (uncredited)
- Double Confession (1950) – Joe (uncredited)
- Paul Temple's Triumph (1950) – Telephone Engineer (uncredited)
- Mr Drake's Duck (1951) – Higgins
- Circle of Danger (1951) – Ernie (The Diver) (uncredited)
- Appointment with Venus (1951) – 1st Naval Rating
- The Case of the Missing Scene (1951) – George
- Island Rescue (1951) – 1st Naval Rating
- Old Mother Riley's Jungle Treasure (1951) – Steve
- Saturday Island a.k.a Island of Desire (1952) – Wounded Marine
- Penny Princess (1952) – Julien / Postman / Farmer
- Will Any Gentleman...? (1953) – Stage Manager
- Colonel March Investigates (1953) – Bank clerk (uncredited)
- Is Your Honeymoon Really Necessary? (1953) – Liftman
- Watch Out (1953, short) – Dickie Duffle
- A Good Pull-up (1953, short) – Dickie Duffle
- The Gay Dog (1954) – Another Betting Man
- Fun at St. Fanny's (1956) – The Potter
- Blow Your Own Trumpet (1958) – Mr. Bob Duff
- Tom Thumb (1958) – Kapellmeister
- The Spider's Web (1960) – Inspector Lord
- Escort for Hire (1960) – Inspector Bruce
- Murder, She Said (1961) – Ticket Collector
- Fate Takes a Hand (1961) – Ronnie
- The Day the Earth Caught Fire (1961) – 2nd Sub-Editor (uncredited)
- She'll Have to Go, a.k.a. Maid for Murder (1962) – Doctor
- Kill or Cure (1962) – Green Glades Barman
- Live Now – Pay Later (1962) – Fred
- The Prince and the Pauper (1962) – Will
- The Rescue Squad (1963) – Mr. Maggs
- The Switch (1963) – Fashion Photographer (uncredited)
- The Odd Man, "Prince on a White Horse" (1963) – Victor West
- Doctor in Distress (1963) – Ambulance Driver
- The Edgar Wallace Mystery Theatre, "Never Mention Murder" (1964) – Porter
- A Home of Your Own (1965) – The Carpenter
- The Amorous Adventures of Moll Flanders (1965) – Grunt
- Carry On Cowboy (1965) – Doc
- Carry On Screaming! (1966) – Detective Constable Slobotham
- A Funny Thing Happened on the Way to the Forum (1966) – Roman Sentry #2
- Don't Lose Your Head (1966) – Citizen Bidet
- Ouch! (short, 1967) – Jonah Whale
- Carry On Follow That Camel (1967) – Simpson
- Carry On Doctor (1967) – Mr. Smith
- Danny the Dragon (1967) – Farmer
- Prudence and the Pill (1968) – Chemist
- Carry On Up the Khyber (1968) – Brother Belcher
- Carry On Camping (1969) – Mr. Fiddler
- Carry On Again Doctor (1969) – Shuffling Patient
- Carry On Loving (1970) – Sinister Client (uncredited)
- Carry On Henry (1971) – Charles, Earl of Bristol (uncredited)
- The Magnificent Seven Deadly Sins (1971) – Guest Appearance (segment "Sloth")
- A Class by Himself (1972) – Clutton
- Bless This House (1972) – Trevor Lewis
- Carry On Abroad (1972) – Pepe
- Not Now Darling (1973) – Painter (uncredited)
- Carry On Girls (1973) – Admiral
- Carry On Dick (1974) – Tom
- Carry On Behind (1975) – Henry Barnes
- Robin and Marian (1976) – Surgeon
- The Ritz (1976) – Patron In Chaps
- Carry On England (1976) – Major Carstairs
- What's Up Nurse! (1978) – Police Sergeant
- Carry On Emmannuelle (1978) – Richmond
- The First Great Train Robbery, a.k.a. The Great Train Robbery (1979) – Putnam

== Television roles ==
- By Candlelight (1949) (BBC TV) – Linder
- How Do You View? (1950–1951) (BBC TV) – various sketch roles
- BBC Sunday Night Theatre, "The Happy Sunday Afternoon" – Danny Broadhurst
- Saturday Special (1951–1953), 31 episodes – Mr Chadwicke-Bugle
- Whirlygig (1951) (BBC TV), Episode #1.18 – Police Sergeant
- The Passing Show (1951) (BBC TV), "1940–1946: Only Yesterday" – Pub strategist
- Aladdin (1951) (BBC TV) – Widow Twankey
- Trial Gallop (1952) (BBC TV)
- Friends and Neighbours (1954) (BBC TV), 6 episodes – George Bird
- Theatre Royal, "The Stocking" (1955) (ATV) – Sam Adams
- Those Kids (1956) (ATV), 16 episodes – My Oddy
- ITV Play of the Week, "I Killed the Count" (1956) – Chief Detective Inspector Davidson
- Armchair Theatre, "The Common Man" (1956) – Albert Price
- Armchair Theatre, "Start from Scratch" (1957) – Henry Cantrell
- Armchair Theatre, "Off the Deep End" (1957) – Fred Dewsnap
- Any Old Iron? (1957) (BBC TV) – Old Sam
- The Anne Shelton Show (1959) (ATV)
- No Hiding Place, "Everybody Loves Jerry" (1959) (ITV) – Wellman
- Inside Story, "A Present for Penny" (1960) (TV series) – Ernest Day
- Meet the Champ (1960) (BBC TV), 6 episodes – Sammy, trainer
- The Cheaters (1961–1962) (ABC) – "The Legacy" (1961): Tim; "Time to Kill" (1962): Anderson
- Armchair Theatre, "His Polyvinyl Girl" (1961) – Albert Potter
- Alfred Marks Time (1961) (ITV)
- ITV Television Playhouse, "Mr. Cole and the Middle Kingdom" (1961) – Mr. Cole
- Armchair Theatre, "The Fishing Match" (1962) – Boney
- Bulldog Breed, "The New Garage" and "The New Digs" (1962 (Granada TV) – Henry Broadbent
- Dixon of Dock Green, "Dead Jammy" (1962) – Jammy Tate
- The Danny Thomas Show, "A Hunting We Will Go" (1962) (CBS) – Publican (uncredited)
- The Magical World of Disney (1962–1963), 5 episodes – Will the Knifegrinder / Zigon
- ITV Play of the Week, "The Kidnapping of Mary Smith" (1963) – Mr. MacDiarmid
- ITV Play of the Week, "Cunningham 5101" (1963) – Mr. Kitchener
- BBC Sunday-Night Play, "The Holly Road Rig" (1963) – Mr. Meedle
- Emergency Ward 10 (1964), five episodes – Herbert Evans
- Festival, "Police" (1964) – Sergeant
- The Roy Castle Show (1964) (BBC TV)
- Drama 61-67, "Drama '64: A Menace to Decent People" (1964) (ATV) – Jenkins
- Armchair Mystery Theatre, "The Blackmailing of Mr S" (1964) (ABC) – Vicary
- Love Story, "The Apprentices" (1964) (ATV) – Mr. Davies
- Just Jimmy, "Chips with Nothing" (1964)
- Danger Man a.k.a. Secret Agent, "The Ubiquitous Mr. Lovegrove" (1965) (ITC) – 'Umbrella'
- ITV Play of the Week, "We Thought You'd Like to Be Caesar" (1965) – Ernest Rogers
- Public Eye, "A Harsh World for Zealots" (1965) – Arthur Gates
- Six of the Best, "Porterhouse: Private Eye" (1965) (ATV) – Edwin Porterhouse
- Doctor Who (1965–1966) (BBC TV) – "Checkmate", "A Battle of Wits", "The Meddling Monk", "The Watcher (1965): Monk; "Escape Switch", "Golden Death", "Volcano" (1966): The Meddling Monk
- Hugh and I, "It Never Rains" (1966) (BBC TV)
- The Frankie Howerd Show (1966) (BBC TV)
- The Informer, "Keep off the Grass" (1967) – Manny Hirschorn
- Danny the Dragon(1967) (CFF) – Farmer
- Scott on..., 21 episodes (1968–1972) (BBC TV)
- The Sooty Show (1968–1974) (BBC/ITV), four episodes
- Inside George Webley, "Get Well Soon" (1968) – Dr. Horniman
- The Wednesday Play, "The Fabulous Frump" (1969) (BBC TV) – Albert Gill
- Wink to Me Only, "The Lost Chord" (1969) (BBC TV) – Piano tuner
- Nearest and Dearest, "Now Is the Hour" (1969) (ITV) – Lord Mayor
- Carry on Christmas (1969) (ITV) – Dracula / Street Beggar / Convent Girl
- Catweazle, eleven episodes (1970–1971) – Groome / Colonel Upshaw
- Ours Is a Nice House, "Judge for Yourself" (1970) (ITV) – Honest Harry
- Kindly Leave the Kerb, six episodes (1971) (LWT) – Ernest Tanner
- A Class by Himself, six episodes (1972) (ITV) – Clutton
- Carry On Christmas: Carry On Stuffing (1972) (ITV) – 1st Singing Caveman / Guest / 2nd Dart player
- Dad's Army, "The Face on the Poster" (1975) (BBC TV) – Mr. Bugden
- Carry On Laughing, nine episodes (1975) (ITV)
- A Bunch of Fives, "A Cry for Help" (1977) (ATV) – Albert Harris
- Odd Man Out, seven episodes, (1977) (ITV) – Wilf
- The Dancing Princesses (1978) (ATV) – The Chamberlain
- Afternoon Off (1979) (ITV) – Mr Bywaters

== Sources ==
- Ainsworth, John, ed. (2016). "The Crusade, The Space Museum, The Chase and The Time Meddler". Doctor Who: The Complete History. 5 (11). London: Panini Comics, Hachette Partworks. ISSN 2057-6048.
- Bright, Ross, Morris, Robert (2000). Mr Carry On – The Life & Work of Peter Rogers. London: BBC Books. ISBN 978-0-563-55183-6.
- Brown, Janet (1986). The Prime Mimicker. London: Robson Books Ltd. ISBN 978-0-86051-247-9.
- Ross, Robert (2002). The Carry On Companion. London: Batsford. ISBN 978-0-7134-8771-8.
