= How to Kill 400 Duponts =

- Directed by: Steno
- Story by: Castellano & Pipolo
- Starring: Johnny Dorelli
- Cinematography: Mario Capriotti
- Edited by: Ornella Micheli
- Music by: Franco Pisano
- Production companies: Inter Jet Film; Mega Film
- Release date: 1967
- Running time: 96 minutes
- Country: Italy

How to Kill 400 Duponts (Italian: Arrriva Dorellik) is a 1967 Italian comedy film directed by Steno. The main character of the film, Dorellik, is a parody of the comic series Diabolik. The character was created in the late 1960s for several sketches on television.

== Plot ==
Dorellik, an Italian contract killer who lives on the French Riviera accepts a job to kill everyone named Dupont in France for a rich customer who expects to receive a large inheritance.

== Cast ==
- Johnny Dorelli as Dorellik
- Margaret Lee as Baby Eva
- Alfred Adam as Inspector Saval
- Terry-Thomas as Police Commissioner Green
- Riccardo Garrone as Vladimiro Dupont
- Rossella Como as Barbara Leduc
- Didi Perego as Gisele Dupont
- Agata Flori as Carlotta
- Piero Gerlini as Raphael Dupont
- Totò Mignone as Berthold Dupont
- Samson Burke as Last Dupont

== Production ==
How to Kill 400 Duponts was a film starring popular singer and television host Johnny Dorelli. The Italian title Arriva Dorellik made reference to Dorelli's character Dorellik, which premiered on his television show Johnny Sera.

== Release ==
How to Kill 400 Duponts was released in Italy in 1967. Producer Dino De Laurentiis had been producing a film based on the Diabolik fumetti neri series and sued the producers of How to Kill 400 Duponts over their original title Dorellik, which led to the film being re-titled Arriva Dorellik (lit. Here Comes Dorellik) just before the film's release. Terry-Thomas, who played a starring role in Arriva Dorellik, also ended up guest-starring in De Laurentiis' Danger: Diabolik.

== See also ==
- List of Italian films of 1967
- Terry-Thomas on screen, radio, stage and record
