= Janet Brown =

Scottish actress and impersonator (1923–2011)

- Born: Janet McLuckie Brown; 14 December 1923; Rutherglen, Lanarkshire, Scotland
- Died: 27 May 2011 (aged 87); Hove, East Sussex, England
- Occupations: Actress; comedian; impressionist
- Years active: 1946–2009
- Spouse: Peter Butterworth (m. 1946; died 1979)
- Children: 2, including Tyler Butterworth

Janet McLuckie Brown (14 December 1923 – 27 May 2011) was a Scottish actress, comedian and impressionist who gained considerable fame in the 1970s and 1980s for her impersonations of Margaret Thatcher. Brown was the wife of Peter Butterworth, who was best known for his appearances in the Carry On films. Butterworth died in 1979 and Brown never remarried.

== Career ==
Brown was born in Rutherglen, Lanarkshire, and educated at Rutherglen Academy.

During World War II, Brown enlisted in the Auxiliary Territorial Service, and was the first female performer to take part in Stars in Battledress.

She entered British film as an actress in 1948, notably in Folly to Be Wise (1952), and then appeared in several British television series, such as The Eric Barker Half-Hour (1952), How Do You View? (1952–1953) and Friends and Neighbours (1954).

== Margaret Thatcher impersonations ==
Beginning with Margaret Thatcher's election as the leader of the Conservative Party in 1975, Brown gained increasing prominence because of her realistic impression of the Tory politician. She performed as Thatcher on BBC TV's Mike Yarwood Show, on BBC Radio's The News Huddlines, and on film in the 1981 James Bond film, For Your Eyes Only.

In 1979, Brown starred as Thatcher on the comedy album Iron Lady: The Coming of the Leader, written by Private Eye satirist John Wells and produced by Secret Policeman's Ball series co-creator/producer Martin Lewis and Not the Nine O'Clock News series co-creator/producer John Lloyd. The largely sprechstimme track "Iron Lady" was released as a single, and Brown promoted it on Top of the Pops as a new release, but it did not chart.

She was the subject of This Is Your Life in 1980 when she was surprised by Eamonn Andrews.

During the 1970s and 1980s, she was occasionally confused by some with fellow actress and comedienne Faith Brown because they had the same surname and were both best remembered for their Margaret Thatcher impersonations. In 1990, she recorded a spoken-word sequence in her Margaret Thatcher voice for Mike Oldfield's album Amarok. Still acting in her eighties, her last role was as Old Lady Squeamish on the London West End stage in a production of Wycherley's The Country Wife at the Theatre Royal Haymarket, which opened in September 2007.

She entitled her 1986 autobiography Prime Mimicker.

== Personal life ==
Brown was married to Carry On actor Peter Butterworth from 1946 until his death in 1979. The two appeared alongside each other in the television comedy series How Do You View? (1947–53), written by and starring Terry-Thomas. They also appeared together in the 1972 film Bless This House.

The couple had two children, a son, actor Tyler Butterworth (born 1959), and a daughter, Emma, who died in 1996, aged 34.

Brown never remarried, spending the rest of her life in Hove, Sussex. She died following a brief illness in a nursing home in May 2011, aged 87.

== Filmography ==
Title	Year	Role	Notes
Floodtide	1949	Rosie	
A Ray of Sunshine: An Irresponsible Medley of Song and Dance	1950	Self – Impressionist	
Folly to Be Wise	1953	Jessie Killegrew	
A Home of Your Own	1964		
Hey Boy! Hey Girl	1967		
The Adding Machine	1969	Fat Woman	
My Lover, My Son	1970	Mrs. Woods	
Bless This House	1972	Annie Hobbs	
Wombling Free	1977	Womble	Voice
For Your Eyes Only	1981	Margaret Thatcher, The Prime Minister	
Summer Solstice	2005	Mrs. Armstrong	
Underground Ernie	2006	Victoria	Voice
Zorro and Scarlet Whip Revealed!	2010	Mrs. McAlistair	Voice, (final film role)
