= If You Don't Save Paper =

1948 British short public information film

Save Paper For Food Cartons
- Starring: Terry-Thomas
- Production company: Ministry of Information
- Distributed by: British Pathé
- Release date: 1948
- Running time: 1 minute 42 seconds
- Country: United Kingdom
- Language: English

If You Don't Save Paper (also known as Save Paper for Food Cartons) is a 1948 British short film starring Terry-Thomas. It was produced by the Ministry of Information to educate the public about the need to save paper, and was distributed by British Pathé.

== Plot ==
A woman customer sits at the counter in a grocery shop. The shop assistant, not having any paper bags available, fills her pocket with rice, hangs sausages around her neck, pours something in her hat, and places an egg in her mouth. After she leaves, the shop assistant addresses the camera to exhort the audience to save paper.

== Cast ==
- Terry-Thomas as shop assistant
