= How Do You View? =

British TV comedy series (1949–1953)

How Do You View? was the second comedy series on British television, aired from 1949 to 1953 (the first was Pinwright's Progress in 1946). The programme was based on an on-screen persona of Terry-Thomas as "a glamorous, mischievous and discreetly cash-strapped man-about-town", introducing a series of sketches in which he also appeared, alongside Peter Butterworth as his chauffeur; Janet Brown (Butterworth's real life wife); Avril Angers; H. C. Walton as the family retainer, Moulting, Sam Kydd, and Diana Dors as 'Cuddles', in the six episodes of series four. The programme was broadcast live and often included Terry-Thomas walking through control rooms and corridors of the BBC's Lime Grove and Alexandra Palace studios.

The series is described by the author and historian Mark Lewisohn as being "inventive ... truly televisual and not just a radio programme in costume".

== Series history ==
- Series one: 26 October – 21 December 1949
- Series two: 5 April – 17 May 1950
- Series three: 8 November 1950 – 28 February 1951
- Series four: 19 September – 28 November 1951
- Series five: 2 April – 11 June 1952
- Special: 9 September 1953

== Bibliography ==
- Lewisohn, Mark (1998). Radio Times Guide to TV Comedy. London: BBC Books. ISBN 978-0-5633-6977-6.
- McCann, Graham (2009). Bounder! The Biography of Terry-Thomas. London: Aurum Press. ISBN 978-1-84513-441-9.
- Ross, Robert (2002). The Complete Terry-Thomas. London: Reynolds & Hearn. ISBN 978-1-903111-29-1.
