= Top of the Town =

Top of the Town was a 1950s radio programme, broadcast on the BBC Light Programme and hosted by Terry-Thomas.

The pilot episode was broadcast on 5 June 1953 on the BBC Home Service; the first series started shortly afterwards, on 1 November 1953, and was broadcast weekly on the BBC Light Programme for sixteen episodes, until 21 February 1954. A second series was commissioned and ran in weekly episodes for 16 weeks between 31 October 1954 and 27 February 1955.

== Bibliography ==
- McCann, Graham (2009). Bounder! The Biography of Terry-Thomas. London: Aurum Press. ISBN 978-1-84513-441-9.
- Ross, Robert (2002). The Complete Terry-Thomas. London: Reynolds & Hearn. ISBN 978-1-903111-29-1.
