= Annie Gorassini =

Italian actress and singer

Annie Gorassini (born 8 January 1941 in Milan) is an Italian actress and singer, originally a participant in the 1957 Miss World beauty pageant, she went on to star in Messalina (1960), Vulcan, Son of Giove (1962), 8½ (1963), and Stop Train 349 (1963).
