= Variety Bandbox =

BBC Radio variety show (1944–1952)

- Other names: Variety Band-Box
- Genre: Variety show
- Running time: 45–60 minutes
- Country of origin: United Kingdom
- Language: English
- Home station: BBC General Forces Programme; BBC Light Programme
- Hosted by: Philip Slessor; Derek Roy
- Original release: 27 February 1944 – 26 September 1952
- Audio format: Mono

Variety Bandbox is a BBC Radio variety show transmitted initially in the General Forces Programme and then the Light Programme. Featuring a mixture of comic performances and music, the show helped to launch the careers of a number of leading British performers.

== Presenters ==
Presented by Philip Slessor, it became a feature of Sunday evenings for more than eight years between February 1944 and September 1952. Hosting duties would later be taken over by Derek Roy.

== Comedy and notable guests ==
Amongst those who launched their careers on the show was Frankie Howerd, who first appeared on Variety Bandbox in 1947 following a provincial tour. Howerd was to become a fixture of the show and honed his catch phrase-driven comedic style in these appearances. Tony Hancock also featured on the show early in his career. March 1950 saw the debut of a fortnightly series within the show called Blessem Hall which featured several characters voiced by a young Peter Sellers in one of his earliest performances, alongside Miriam Karlin.

Arthur English, who debuted on the show in 1949, also gained prominence through his broadcasts and was for a time 'resident comedian' on the show, despite his tendency to upset the producers by also including visual gags in his act. The show also provided Bill Kerr with his first break in the UK whilst Max Wall was a regular performer on the show. Although not as performers on Variety Bandbox, Eric Sykes and Bob Monkhouse both began as a scriptwriter on the show.

== Music ==
As well as comedy Variety Bandbox also featured big band music with the likes of Ted Heath, Geraldo, Ambrose, Woolf Phillips, and Joe Loss all leading their orchestras.

== See also ==
- Billy Cotton Band Show
- Comedy Bandbox
- Workers' Playtime
- Albert Modley
