= Rodolphe-Auguste d'Ornano =

French aristocrat and politician

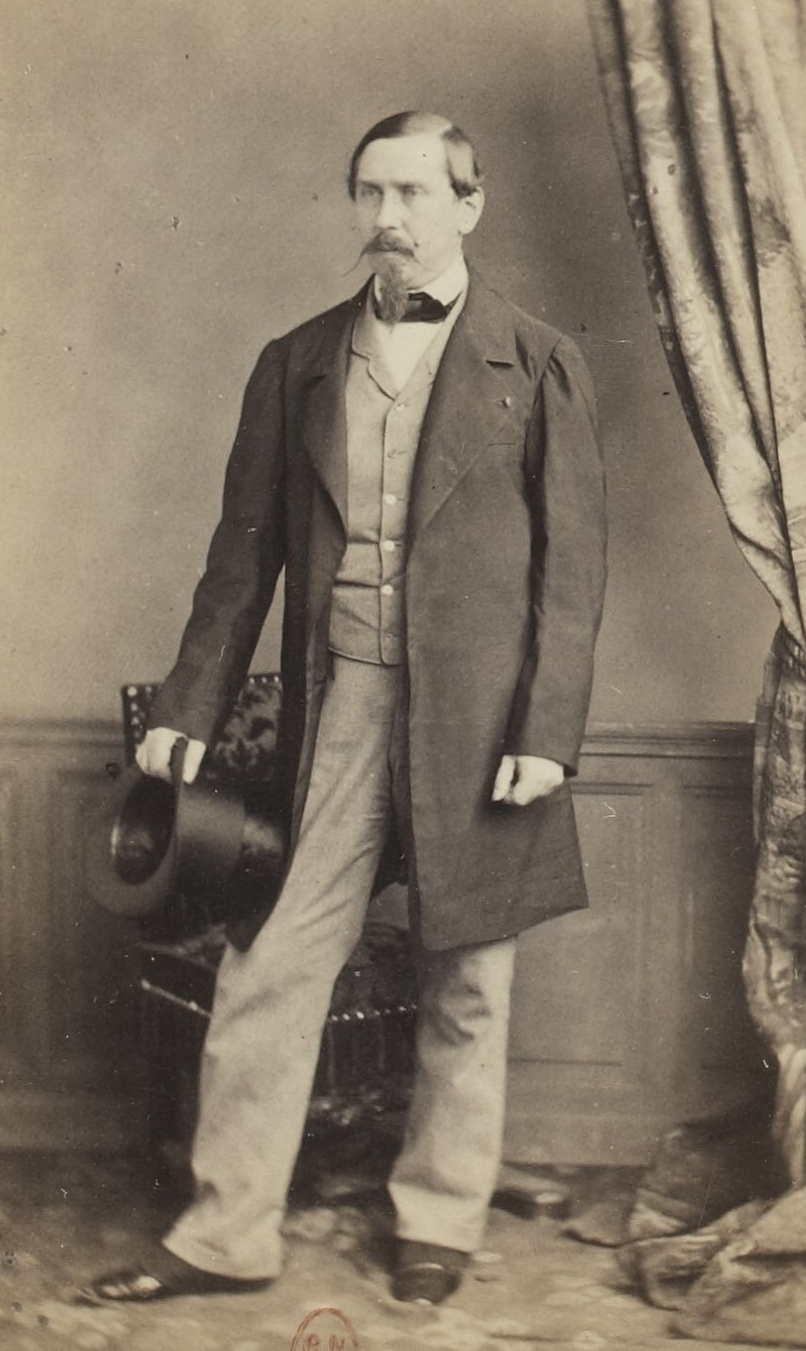
Count d'Ornano

Count Rodolphe-Auguste Louis Maurice d'Ornano (9 June 1817 – 14 October 1865) was a French aristocrat and politician during the Second French Empire.

== Early life ==
Rodolphe-Auguste was born on 9 June 1817 in Liège, Belgium where his parents had settled due to his father's pro-Napoleonic allegiances. He was the only child of Count Philippe Antoine d'Ornano, Marshal of France, and Countess Marie Walewska, who died in Paris shortly afterwards due to a prolonged kidney illness. Before his parents were married, his mother was married to Count Athenasius Colonna-Walewski, whom she divorced in 1812. From her prior marriage, he had several half-siblings, including Count Antoni Colonna-Walewski and Count Alexandre Joseph Colonna-Walewski, the unacknowledged son of Napoleon Bonaparte.

His paternal grandparents were Lodovico Antonio d'Ornano and Isabella Maria Buonaparte (through whom his father was a second cousin of Napoleon). His mother, who was born in Kiernozia, Poland, was a daughter of Count Mathieu Łączyński (starosta of Gostyń) and Eva Zaborowska.

He was educated at the Lycée Louis-le-Grand before attending the École spéciale militaire de Saint-Cyr.

== Career ==
At the age of 18, he joined the diplomatic corps of King Louis-Philippe and worked at the French embassies in Dresden and Westminster, but had to leave the diplomatic service because of his ties to his cousin Napoleon III. Following his time in the diplomatic corps, he took up literary work, as well as historical and political journalism. He traveled extensively around Europe, including to Corsica, the birthplace of the Bonapartes and the d'Ornanos.

After Napoleon III came to power in the Second French Empire, he was appointed prefect of the Yonne department, serving from 1851 to 1853 before becoming Deputy of Yonne to the Legislative Assembly, serving from 1853 until his death in 1865.

At the imperial court, he served as Chamberlain and master of ceremonies. Napoleon III gave him a commandery with the star of the Legion of Honour, the count also had many high foreign decorations.

== Personal life ==
On 16 June 1845 Count d'Ornano married Aline Élisabeth, Marquise de Voyer d'Argenson (1826–1899), in Tours, France. She was a daughter of Charles Marc-René de Voyer de Paulmy d'Argenson, 5th Marquis d'Argenson and Anne-Marie Faure. Together, they had six children:

- Countess Vanine Marie d'Ornano (1846–1880), who married Baron Jules de Bouvet.
- Count Alphonse Antoine d'Ornano (1848–1908), who married Marie Colonna d'Istria.
- Countess Isabelle Aline d'Ornano (1850–1874), who married Cesar de Carini La Grua Talamanca, 9th Prince of Carini, son of Antonino Francesco La Grua Talamanca e Sabatini, 8th Prince of Carini.
- Countess Laure Rodolphine-Louise d'Ornano (1852–1928), who married Count Emmanuel de Laugier de Beaurecueil.
- Count Ludovic d'Ornano (1855–1886), who married Olga Gérard de Rayneval.
- Countess Marie-Anne-Berthe d'Ornano (1857–1911), who married the Prince of Carini in 1877 following her elder sister's death.

Count d'Ornano died on 14 October 1865 in Paris. His widow died at the Château de la Branchoire in Chambray-lès-Tours.
