= Walewski =

Polish noble family

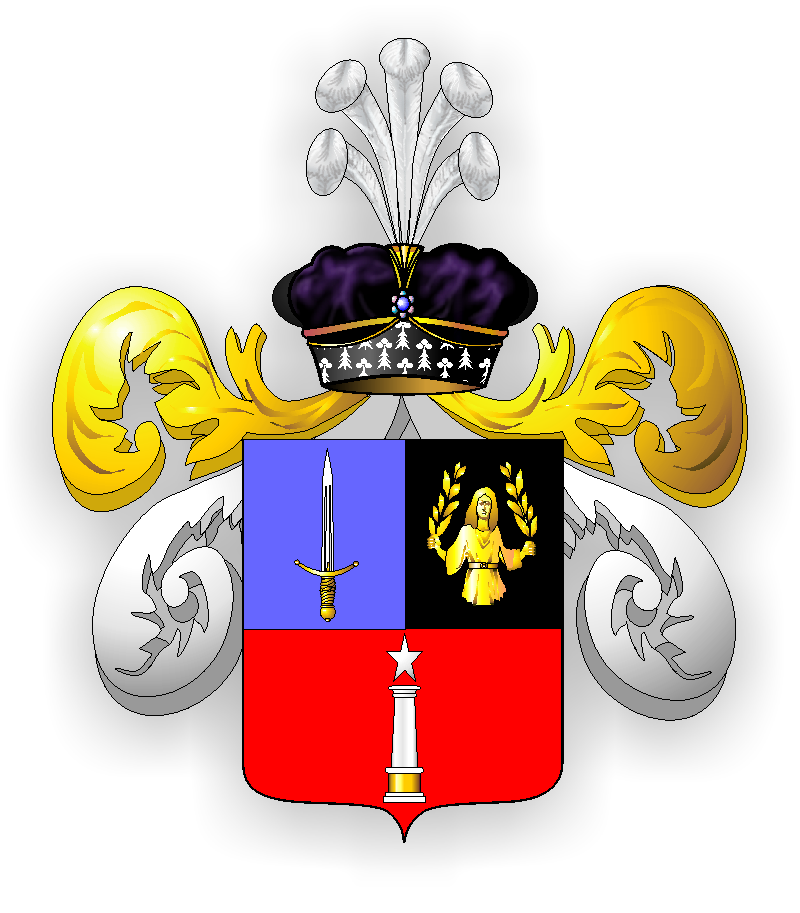
Coat of arms of Count Colonna-Walewski

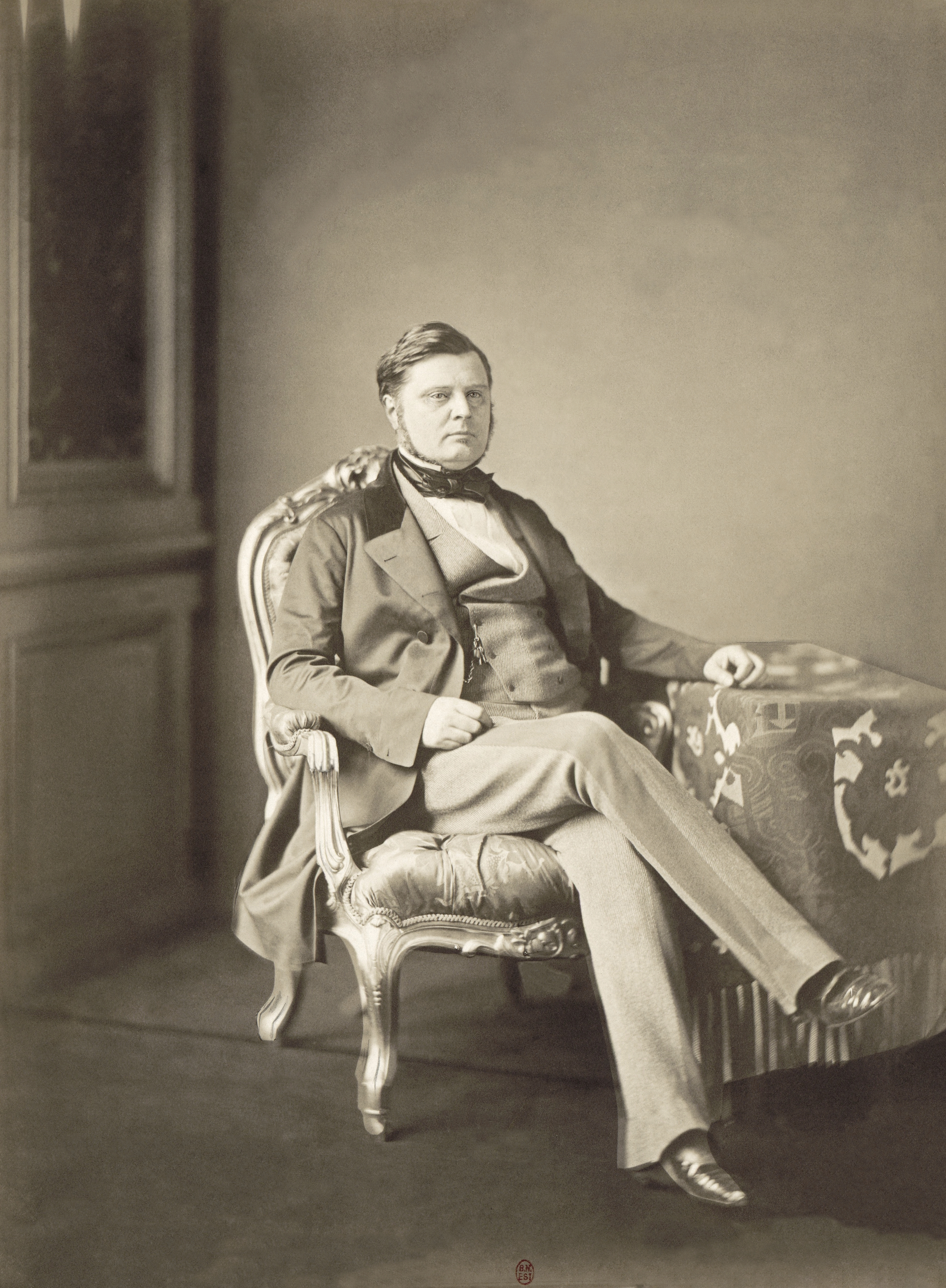
Aleksander Colonna-Walewski

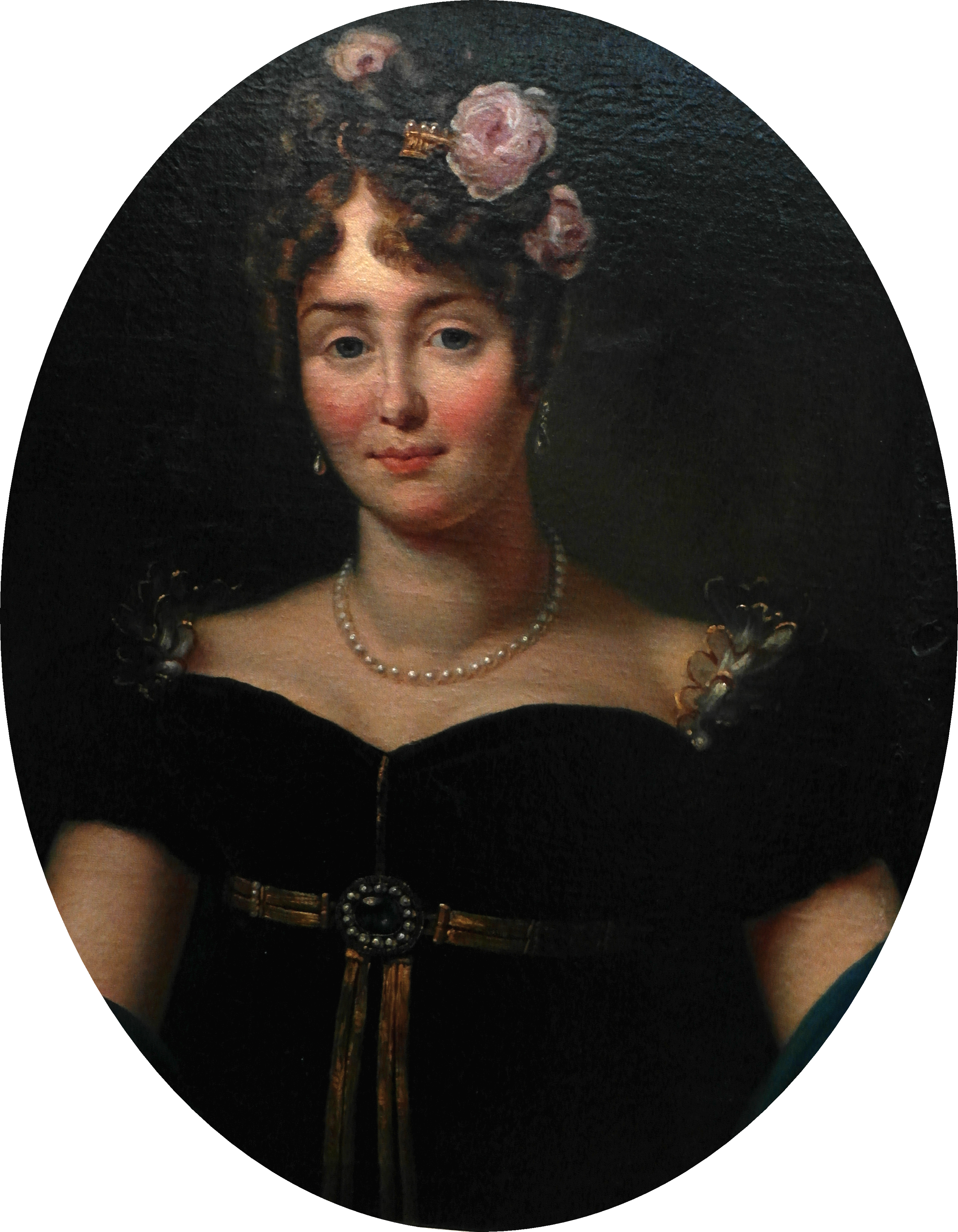
Maria Walewska; portrait by François Gérard

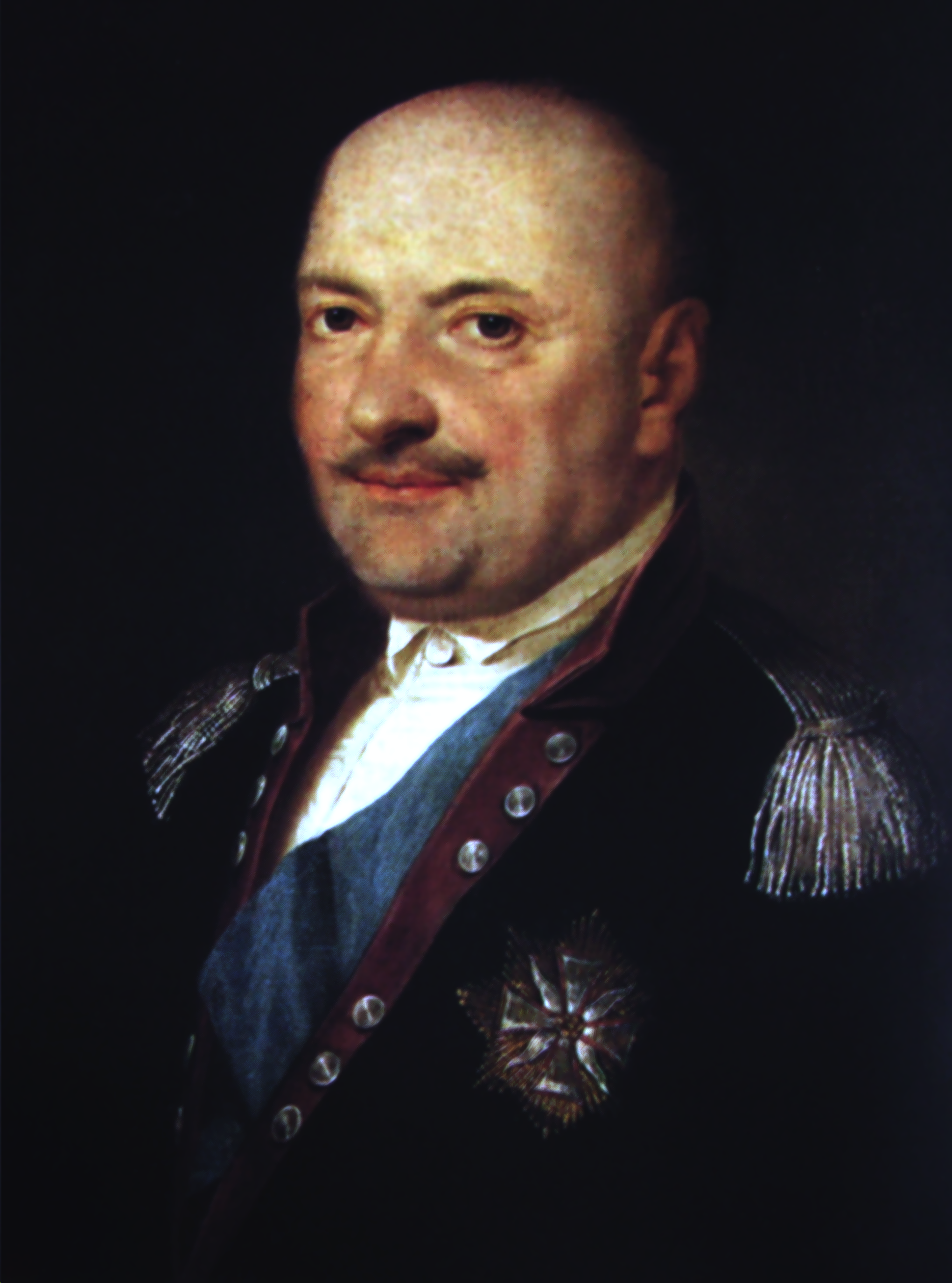
Michał Walewski; portrait by Józef Pitschmann (1788)

The Walewski family (plural: Walewscy, feminine form: Walewska) was an influential Polish noble family which originated from Walewice in Łęczyca Land, firstly mentioned in 1382.

== History ==
The family issued 15 senators in the First Polish Republic (1574-1795), one senator of the Polish Kingdom (1819-1831), 4 Knights of the Order of the White Eagle, 4 Knights of the Order of Virtuti Militari in the Napoleonic era and 2 during the November Uprising 1830–31, 1 Knight of Malta and 3 canonesses of Warsaw.

== Notable members ==
- Aleksander Colonna-Walewski (1778-1845), senator
- Aleksander Colonna-Walewski (1810-1868), Polish and French politician, Illegitimate son of Emperor Napoleon I
- Marcin Walewski (died 1761), podkomorzy of Sieradz
- Maria Walewska, mistress of Emperor Napoleon. In her later years she married Count Philippe Antoine d'Ornano.
- Michał Walewski (1735-1806), Voivode of Sieradz
- Władysław Walewski, co-author of the Geographical Dictionary of the Kingdom of Poland
- Wincenty Colonna Walewski, (1841-1896), Count, veteran of the January Uprising
- Bogumił Gabriel Walewski, cześnik of Sieradz in 1793, member of the Great Sejm

== Coat of arms ==
The coat of arms of the family was Pierzchała.

Pierzchała (Kolumna)

== Residences ==
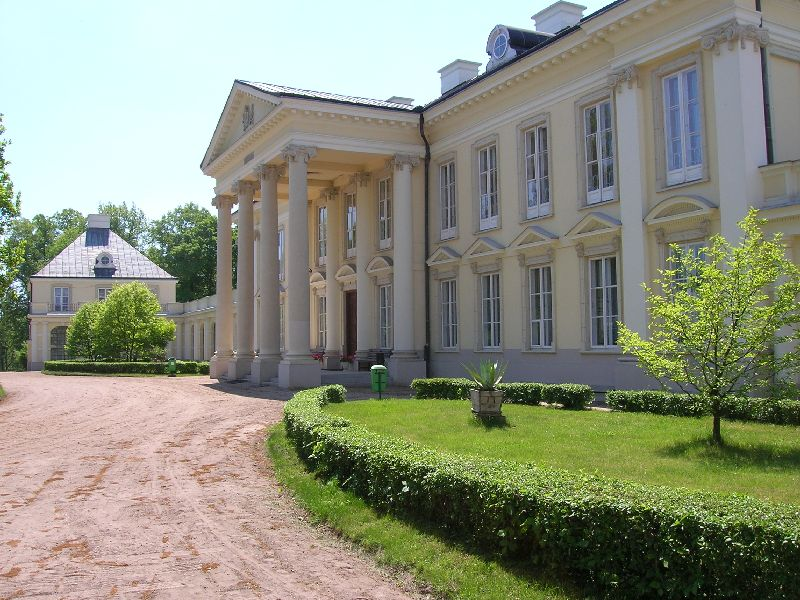
Walewscy Palace in Walewice
