= D'Ornano =

d'Ornano is a surname. Notable people with the surname include:

- Anne d'Ornano (born 1936), French politician
- Camille d'Ornano (1917–1987), French lieutenant colonel and colonial administrator
- Guillaume d'Ornano (1894–1985), French businessman
- Hubert d'Ornano (1926–2015), French businessman
- Jean-Baptiste d'Ornano (1581–1626), French aristocrat
- Michel d'Ornano (1924–1991), French politician
- Mireille d'Ornano (born 1951), French politician
- Philippe Antoine d'Ornano (1784–1863), French soldier and politician
- Rodolphe-Auguste d'Ornano (1817–1865), French politician
