= Conquest (1937 film) =

1937 film by Clarence Brown, Gustav Machatý

- Theatrical release poster
- Directed by: Clarence Brown; Gustav Machatý (uncredited)
- Screenplay by: S. N. Behrman; Salka Viertel; Samuel Hoffenstein; Talbot Jennings; Zoë Akins
- Based on: Pani Walewska by Wacław Gąsiorowski (1904 book); Helen Jerome (1933 play)
- Produced by: Bernard H. Hyman
- Starring: Greta Garbo; Charles Boyer; Reginald Owen; Alan Marshal
- Cinematography: Karl Freund
- Edited by: Tom Held
- Music by: Herbert Stothart
- Production company: Metro-Goldwyn-Mayer
- Distributed by: Loew's, Inc.
- Release date: October 22, 1937
- Running time: 113 minutes
- Country: United States
- Language: English
- Budget: $2,732,000
- Box office: $2,141,000

Conquest (also called Marie Walewska) is a 1937 American historical-drama film directed by Clarence Brown and starring Greta Garbo, Charles Boyer, and Reginald Owen. It was produced and distributed by Metro-Goldwyn-Mayer. It tells the story of the Polish Countess Marie Walewska, who becomes the mistress of Napoleon in order to influence his actions towards her homeland. The supporting cast includes Alan Marshal, Henry Stephenson, Leif Erickson, Dame May Whitty, George Zucco, and Maria Ouspenskaya.

The movie was adapted by S.N. Behrman, Samuel Hoffenstein, Helen Jerome and Salka Viertel from the novel Pani Walewska by Wacław Gąsiorowski. An uncredited Gustav Machatý took over some of the direction. It was nominated for Best Actor in a Leading Role (Charles Boyer) and Best Art Direction (Cedric Gibbons and William A. Horning).

Its worldwide gross amounted to $2,141,000, but its massive budget led to a loss of $1,397,000.

MGM initially advertised the upcoming release of the film under the title Marie Walewska, but at the last moment changed the title to the more marketable Conquest when the movie arrived in theaters.

The Dad's Army episode "A Soldier's Farewell" starts with the platoon in the cinema, while watching this film.

== Plot ==
Napoleon Bonaparte (Charles Boyer) launches an unsuccessful seduction of the Countess Marie Walewska (Greta Garbo), who is married to a much older man (Henry Stephenson), but she resists until convinced that giving in will save Poland. After her husband annuls their marriage and Napoleon divorces the Empress Josephine, the pair are free to formalize their happy relationship, but Napoleon shocks her by announcing his decision to wed the Archduchess Marie Louise of Austria for political reasons. While he doesn't expect it to impact his relationship with Marie, she leaves him, without ever telling him that she is expecting his child.

Napoleon is defeated in Russia. On the island of Elba where Napoleon is exiled, she brings their child, Alexander, though without telling him that Napoleon is his father. She carries a message away from Elba that helps Napoleon escape from the island, but he is defeated at Waterloo. She visits him at Rochefort as he is to go into British captivity and offers to sneak him away to escape to America, but he asks what he would do there, and says he must follow his star instead. Marie and Alexander watch him being rowed away to a British ship, and she tells her son they must pray that Napoleon following his star will bring him peace.

== Cast ==
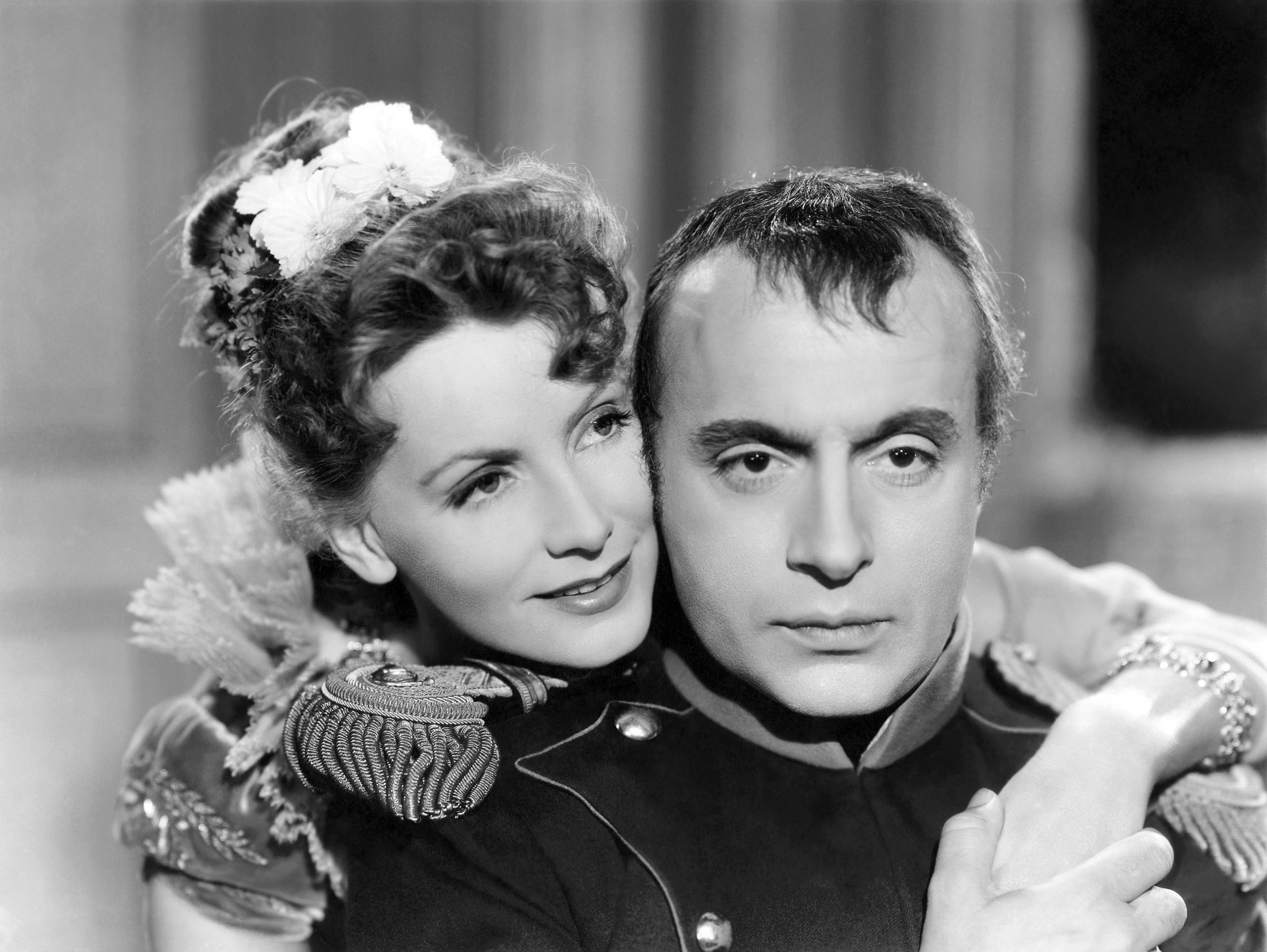
Greta Garbo and Charles Boyer in Conquest

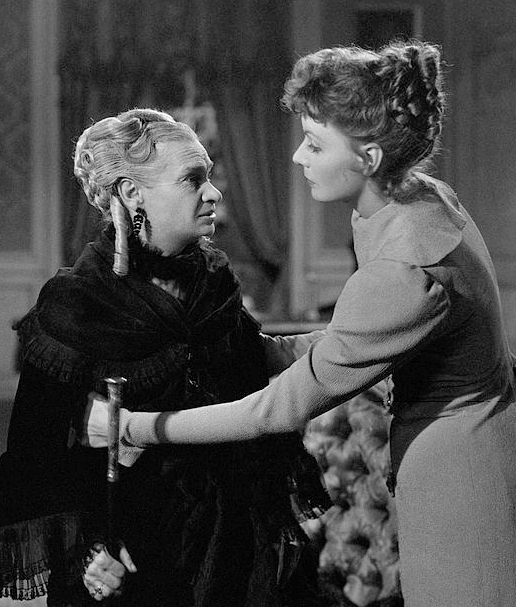
Maria Ouspenskaya and Greta Garbo

- Greta Garbo as Countess Marie Walewska
- Charles Boyer as Emperor Napoleon Bonaparte
- Reginald Owen as Talleyrand
- Alan Marshal as Captain d'Ornano
- Henry Stephenson as Count Anastas Walewski
- Leif Erickson as Paul Lachinski (as Leif Erikson)
- Dame May Whitty as Maria Letizia Buonaparte
- Maria Ouspenskaya as Countess Pelagia Walewska
- C. Henry Gordon as Prince Poniatowski
- Claude Gillingwater as Stephan (Marie's servant)
- Vladimir Sokoloff as Dying soldier
- George F. Houston as Géraud Duroc

Uncredited Cast

- Stanley Andrews as Prince Mirska
- Oscar Apfel as Count Potocki
- Scotty Beckett as Alexandre Walewski
- Betty Blythe as Princess Mirska
- Ed Brady as Soldier
- George Cowl as Count Augustus Walewski
- Paul Fix as Dumb Soldier
- Henry Kolker as Sen. Wybitcki
- Mitchell Lewis as Beppo
- Lois Meredith as Countess Potocka
- Charles Middleton as Sergeant at Elba
- Dennis O'Keefe as Jan Walewski
- Robert Warwick as Capt. Laroux
- Ian Wolfe as Prince Metternich
- Noble Johnson as Roustam Raza
- George Givot as Constant

== Production ==
Boyer's fee was $125,000, with an equal amount to be paid for any French version, as well as an overtime provision. In the final event, Boyer earned $450,000 for his performance; reshoots on the film saw the budget rise.

== Reception ==
Conquest grossed $730,000 in the United States and $1,411,000 in other markets, bringing the total sum of $2,141,000. Although a success with audiences, the film's high budget resulted in a loss of $1,397,000.

Writing for Night and Day in 1937, Graham Greene gave the film a poor review, characterizing it simply as "one of the dullest films of the year". Greene's chief complaints came from the plot, writing, and "middlebrow" dialogue which inelegantly attempted to bridge "poetic and realistic drama". Greene also notes a number of scenes or moments of "unconscious comedy" which undermined the film and let to a feeling of "great fake emotions booming out - Love, Country, Ambition". On Rotten Tomatoes, the film scored 100% based on five reviews.
