= Paris Declaration Respecting Maritime Law =

1856 international treaty with legal novelty that nations could accede afterwards

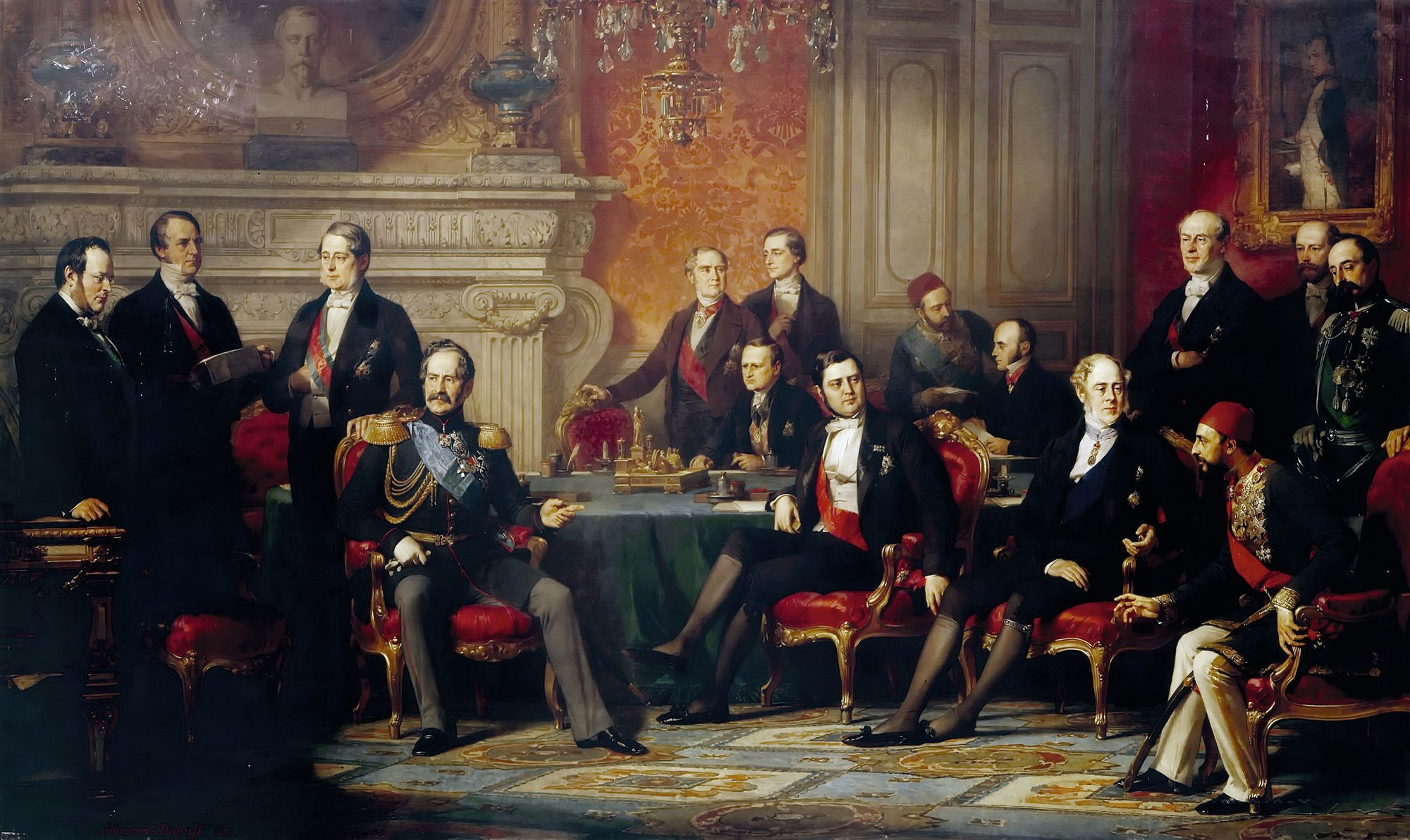
Negotiators assembled at for the Congress of Paris. The Congress of Paris by Edouard Dubufe, 1856

The Paris Declaration Respecting Maritime Law of 16 April 1856 was an international multilateral treaty agreed to by the warring parties in the Crimean War gathered at the Congress at Paris after the peace treaty of Paris had been signed in March 1856. As an important juridical novelty in international law, the treaty for the first time created the possibility for nations that were not involved in the establishment of the agreement and did not sign, to become a party by acceding the declaration afterwards. So did altogether 55 nations, which otherwise would have been impossible in such a short period. This represented a large step in the globalisation of international law.

The primary goal of both the Second French Empire and the United Kingdom of Great Britain and Ireland was to abolish privateering, a part of naval warfare whereby a belligerent party gave formal permission to privately owned ships by letters of marque to seize enemy vessels. By disrupting commerce, privateers could be effective against enemies that depended on trade and force them to deploy their warships to protect their merchant ships. In this way, maritime nations could wage war against larger land-based powers by the destruction of their commerce. The Paris Declaration established international policies related to neutral and belligerent shipping on the high seas, introducing new rules for prizes of war, a piece of enemy property seized by a belligerent party during or after a war or battle, typically at sea. The plenipotentiaries agreed on three major points: free ships make free goods, effective blockade, and no privateering. In return for surrendering the practice of seizing neutral goods on enemy ships, France insisted on Britain's abandoning its Rule of 1756 prohibiting neutral assumption of enemy coastal and colonial trade.

== History ==
To put an end to the Crimean War (1853–1856), a series of diplomatic meetings were organised in Paris to negotiate peace, modelled after the Congress of Vienna. On the conclusion of the Treaty of Paris, which was signed on 30 March 1856, the plenipotentiaries assembled in conference also did agree on this declaration, at the suggestion of Count Walewski, the French Prime-Minister. The declaration is the outcome of a modus vivendi signed between France and Britain at the dawn of the Crimean War in 1854 becoming war allies for the first time. These two powers had agreed that they would not seize enemy goods on neutral vessels nor neutral goods on enemy vessels. The belligerents had also agreed that they would not issue letters of marque, which they actually had not done during the war. At the close of this war the principal states of Europe concluded that private armed ships, maintained at private cost for private gain, and often necessarily for a long time beyond the reach of the regular naval force of the state, could not be kept under proper control. With the agreements written down in the Declaration of Paris these rules were confirmed and added to them the principle that blockades, in order to be obligatory, must be effective.

The Declaration did not as such make privateers into a new category of international criminals, but rather made it a treaty obligation of states that they refrain from commissioning privateers in the first place. Most states normally treated foreign privateers as pirates in any case. In the plain wordings of the Declaration:

- Privateering is and remains abolished;
- The neutral flag covers enemy's goods, with the exception of contraband of war;
- Neutral goods, with the exception of contraband of war, are not liable to capture under enemy's flag;
- Blockades, in order to be binding, must be effective—that is to say, maintained by a force sufficient really to prevent access to the coast of the enemy.

The Declaration has been signed by Great Britain, Austria, France, Prussia, Russia, Sardinia, and Turkey. Ultimately, 55 states, royal houses and free cities ratified the Declaration, including the Ottoman Empire. This treaty established maritime law among the major powers of Europe. It represented the first multilateral attempt to codify in times of peace rules which were to be applicable in the event of war. This declaration bound only its signatories and nations that did accede later, when at war with each other, and left them free to use privateers when at war with other states.

=== Position of the United States ===
The United States, which aimed at a complete exemption of non-contraband private property from capture at sea, withheld its formal adherence in 1857 when its "Marcy" amendment was not accepted by all powers, chiefly as a result of British influence. His proposed amendment would have exempted from seizure in time of war all private property that was not contraband, including enslaved persons. The US was also keen on maintaining privateers. It argued that, not possessing a great navy, it would be obliged in time of war to rely largely upon merchant ships commissioned as war vessels, and that therefore the abolition of privateering would be entirely in favour of European powers, whose large navies rendered them practically independent of such aid. Several other maritime states did not accede to the declaration, such as China, Venezuela, Bolivia, Costa Rica, Honduras, and El Salvador.

In 1861, during the American Civil War, the United States declared that it would respect the principles of the declaration during hostilities. The Confederacy agreed to the provisions except for the right of privateering, and went on to extensively employ privateers as blockade runners. During the Spanish–American War of 1898, when the United States Government affirmed its policy of conducting hostilities in conformity with the dispositions of the declaration. Spain too, though not a party, declared its intention to abide by the declaration, but it expressly gave notice that it reserved its right to issue letters of marque. At the same time both belligerents organized services of auxiliary cruisers composed of merchant ships under the command of naval officers.

Some of the questions raised by this declaration were clarified by the 1907 Hague Convention.

The rules contained in this declaration later came to be considered as part of the general principles of international law and the United States too, though not formally a party, abides by provisions.

On February 13, 2025, US Congressmen Tim Burchett (R-TN) and Mark Messmer (R-IN) introduced a bill, The Cartel Marque and Reprisal Authorization Act of 2025, to the House of Representatives. The Act "would authorize President Trump to commission privately armed and equipped actors to seize the persons and property of any cartel, cartel member, or cartel-linked organizations."

== Signing parties ==
The following states signed the Paris Declaration or did accede afterwards:

- Argentina
- Belgium
- Brazil
- Bulgaria
- Chile
- Denmark
- Ecuador
- France
- Greece
- Guatemala
- Haiti
- Japan
- Mexico
- Netherlands
- Ottoman Empire
- Peru
- Portugal
- Republic of New Granada (modern-day Colombia and Panama)
- Russia
- Spain
- States now part of Italy:
  - Duchy of Modena and Reggio
  - Duchy of Parma and Piacenza
  - Grand Duchy of Tuscany
  - Kingdom of Sardinia
  - Kingdom of the Two Sicilies
  - Papal States
- States within the German Confederation:
  - Austrian Empire
  - Duchy of Brunswick
  - Duchy of Mecklenburg-Schwerin
  - Duchy of Mecklenburg-Strelitz
  - Duchy of Nassau
  - Duchy of Saxe-Altenburg
  - Duchy of Saxe-Coburg and Gotha
  - Duchy of Saxe-Meiningen
  - Duchy of Saxe-Weimar
  - Electorate of Hesse
  - Free City of Bremen
  - Free City of Frankfurt
  - Free City of Hamburg
  - Free City of Lübeck
  - Grand Duchy of Baden
  - Grand Duchy of Oldenburg
  - Kingdom of Bavaria
  - Kingdom of Prussia
  - Kingdom of Saxony
  - Kingdom of Württemberg
  - Landgraviate of Hesse-Darmstadt
  - Principality of Anhalt-Dessau
- Sweden–Norway
- Switzerland
- United Kingdom
- Uruguay

== See also ==
- Hague Conventions (1907) which expanded on the provisions of this declaration.
