= A Soldier's Farewell =

- Dad's Army episode
- Episode no.: Series 5 Episode 3
- Directed by: David Croft
- Story by: Jimmy Perry and David Croft
- Original air date: 20 October 1972
- Running time: 30 minutes

Episode chronology
← Previous "Keep Young and Beautiful"	Next → "Getting the Bird"

"A Soldier's Farewell" is the third episode of the fifth series of the British television sitcom Dad's Army. It was originally transmitted on 20 October 1972.

== Synopsis ==
Mainwaring is depressed: his men are falling short of his expectations and his leadership is unappreciated. He then dreams that he is Napoleon at the Battle of Waterloo.

== Plot ==
The episode opens with the Walmington-on-Sea Home Guard unit in Eastgate cinema. They are watching the film Conquest about Napoleon, in particular a scene where he says goodbye to his mistress Marie Walewska. A panning shot moves across the members of the platoon while they are watching; Walker putting his arm around a blonde girl, Jones looking dreamy, Frazer muttering "rubbish", Godfrey asleep, Pike sucking his thumb, Wilson looking bored, and Mainwaring looking superior. After the film ends, "God Save the King" begins playing, but the platoon all stampede out, apart from Mainwaring, who gets knocked over in the rush before standing to attention while the anthem plays to a now empty cinema.

The platoon is next seen on the upper deck of a bus going back to Walmington. Mainwaring expresses his disappointment of the film – he thought it would have been about strategy and tactics but instead consisted of "Greta Garbo being chased around a four-poster bed". Walker replies that that is strategy and tactics. Sponge also says they should have sat at the front as he could not see.

Wilson and Mainwaring are given their tickets by an attractive bus conductress who Mainwaring takes a fancy to. When Walker, Pike and Jones start larking about then singing the ribald song "Roll Me Over in the Clover" Mainwaring stops them and apologises to the conductress. She is grateful and says he is "very gallant". Warden Hodges arrives and teases the platoon for going to the cinema and not being ready for Hitler. Whilst buying a ticket he asks the conductress for a "tickle at the terminus". Mainwaring is furious and intervenes again, and is thanked by the conductress. He then instructs the platoon that after their disgraceful behaviour in the cinema, they are to let him get off the bus first and in an orderly fashion. When they arrive at Walmington, Hodges lets him get halfway down the bus, then shouts "It's closing time in five minutes!", thus causing Mainwaring to get knocked over again in the stampede as the platoon rush for the pub.

Later, the platoon is on parade. Frazer gives a long rambling explanation of how he complained to the manager about the "sheer historical inaccuracies of the film", but eventually admits sheepishly that he got his money back. Mainwaring berates them for the two examples of bad behaviour. They apologise, but he responds by saying that "fine words butter no parsnips". This provokes a discussion in the ranks, about how one cannot get butter or parsnips (with Walker offering to obtain both), until he says that the platoon will have to stand to attention whilst Sergeant Wilson plays the National Anthem on the gramophone six times. They stand to attention, but Wilson plays the German National Anthem "Deutschland Über Alles" by mistake and is half asleep, so Mainwaring has to shout at him to turn it off. He and Wilson go to Mainwaring's office, where they find the vicar at his desk, who refuses to move for Mainwaring. Whilst Jones continues to play the National Anthem at an increasing speed, Mainwaring and the vicar have to stand, then race to sit on the chair, like musical chairs.

The next scene is in Mainwaring's office after the parade. Walker arrives and gives Wilson two bottles of Black Market stout, and presents Mainwaring with some similarly sourced cheddar cheese. Mainwaring excuses this to Wilson by saying it is for his vegetarian wife. He rings her to spring this "toasted cheese supper" surprise on her, but she gets the wrong idea on the phone and says she has a headache and is going to bed. Mainwaring is disappointed, but Wilson suggests they eat the cheese between themselves. Mainwaring is touched, then Jones arrives and, tempted by the cheese, offers some kidneys if he can join them. Cut to the end of the feast, when Jones tells a wonderful rambling story about a native girl he nearly married in the Sudan. Mainwaring leaves to go home, suggesting that the bus conductress they met earlier would not have turned down a toasted cheese supper.

The next scene is in Mainwaring's Anderson shelter in his garden. He is having a restless night after eating the (rather indigestible) meal with Wilson and Jones. He takes some bismuth (indigestion) tablets and falls asleep.

The scene now shifts, and Mainwaring begins dreaming that he is Napoleon at the Battle of Waterloo. It features the rest of the cast in various roles, including Wilson as Wellington, flanked by Frazer as Gordon of the Highlanders and Hodges as a senior officer. Sponge is Marshal Ney, Walker is "Captain Gerald" in the cavalry, Jones is a French Corporal, Pike is a French drummer boy and Godfrey is a French artillery man. Many catchphrases and actions are used: "put those lights out", "you stupid drummer boy", "Godfrey's sister's upside down cakes", "Oi, Napoleon", and also some phrases from earlier in the episode, such as Sponge saying "we should have sat down the front, in the ninepennies" when Mainwaring complains that he cannot see the battle. At the surrender, Wilson acts in a very superior manner, asking Mainwaring for his full name and address and refusing to let Mainwaring borrow his pen. Mainwaring says farewell to his troops, with great comic effect. Hodges then tells the troops that the Duke wants to have a drink with them, and in the stampede they knock Mainwaring over into the mud.

Mainwaring is next seen just before being exiled to Elba, standing next to the bus conductress, who is dressed as Marie Walewska. They exchange farewells, then Mainwaring wakes up to find that he has overslept and he has a rude note from his wife complaining that he was late coming home last night.

== Cast ==
- Arthur Lowe as Captain Mainwaring and Napoleon
- John Le Mesurier as Sergeant Wilson and Wellington
- Clive Dunn as Lance Corporal Jones and French corporal
- John Laurie as Private Frazer and Gordon
- James Beck as Private Walker and French cavalryman Captain Gerald
- Arnold Ridley as Private Godfrey and French artilleryman
- Ian Lavender as Private Pike and French drummer boy
- Bill Pertwee as ARP Warden Hodges and British officer
- Frank Williams as The Vicar
- Robert Gillespie as Charles Boyer playing Napoleon
- Joan Savage as Greta Garbo playing Marie Walewska
- Joy Allen as Bus Conductress and Marie Walewska
- Colin Bean as Private Sponge and Marshal Ney

== Notes ==
1. The film shown in the cinema is supposed to be Conquest, which starred Charles Boyer as Napoleon and Greta Garbo as Marie Walewska. A clip from the film was due to be shown but would have been too expensive to use.
2. The episode copied some details from the feature film Waterloo (1970): the scene where Napoleon kisses the flag, and incorrectly showing Colonel Alexander Gordon, 4th Duke of Gordon as fighting at Waterloo (played by Frazer in the dream sequence).
3. Napoleon Bonaparte was in fact exiled to Elba before the Battle of Waterloo. After this defeat, he was imprisoned on the island of St Helena.
4. This episode is the closest the audience comes to seeing Mrs Mainwaring, when her very large posterior is seen hanging down in the upper bunk above Mainwaring in the Anderson shelter.
5. This is one of two episodes which rather whimsically showed the Dad's Army characters in a historical setting; the other was The Two and a Half Feathers.
6. Writers David Croft and Jimmy Perry recycle the same episode idea (a main character falling asleep after/while watching a film and dream that they are in the film) for an episode of their later sitcom Hi-de-Hi! (the series seven episode "Only The Brave").
