= The Desperate Drive of Corporal Jones =

- Dad's Army episode
- Episode no.: Series 5 Episode 5
- Directed by: David Croft
- Story by: Jimmy Perry and David Croft
- Original air date: 3 November 1972
- Running time: 30 minutes

Episode chronology
← Previous "Getting the Bird"	Next → "If the Cap Fits..."

"The Desperate Drive of Corporal Jones" is the fifth episode of the fifth series of the British comedy series Dad's Army. It was originally transmitted on 3 November 1972.

== Synopsis ==
The platoon, during the course of a weekend exercise, occupies a deserted barn to be denied to the enemy. As Mainwaring inspects the parade, Jones answers a phone call from Colonel Pritchard, who gives him the six-digit map reference "937641". Unfortunately, after writing down the first three digits, Jones' pencil snaps so he goes in search of a spare. Whilst he is gone, Godfrey answers the phone and writes down the last three digits but puts them in the wrong place, so the reference reads 641937. Arriving at the barn a few miles from their destination, Jones' van breaks down, so Mainwaring leaves Jones and Godfrey to guard the vehicles (and also to keep Jones away from the live ammunition) whilst the rest march on.

When Jones rings the exercise HQ to inform them the platoon has arrived, he is told he has got the wrong reference, which turns out to be the target for some 25-pounder artillery guns. Jones signs off laughing that he must have read the numbers wrong, but Godfrey assures him that 641937 is definitely where Captain Mainwaring went. Jones and Godfrey try phoning to stop the firing, but Godfrey has cut the telephone wire by accident. There is only one solution: Jones will have to reach the barn before it is blown up.

== Radio episode ==
=== Notes ===
The reason why Harold Snoad and Michael Knowles changed the name of the TV episode for radio was because the name "A Question of Reference" (referring to the map reference) meant a bit more than "The Desperate Drive of Corporal Jones".

== Cast ==
Character	TV episode	Audio drama
Capt. George Mainwaring	Arthur Lowe	Arthur Lowe
Sgt. Arthur Wilson	John Le Mesurier	John Le Mesurier
Lcpl. Jack Jones	Clive Dunn	Clive Dunn
Pte. James Frazer	John Laurie	John Laurie
Pte. Charles Godfrey	Arnold Ridley	Arnold Ridley
Pte. Joe Walker	James Beck	Larry Martyn
Pte. Frank Pike	Ian Lavender	Ian Lavender
ARP Warden Hodges	Bill Pertwee	
Rev. Timothy Farthing	Frank Williams	
Maurice Yeatman	Edward Sinclair	
Col. Pritchard	Robert Raglan	Peter Williams
Signals Private	Larry Martyn	Michael Burlington
Artillery Officer	James Taylor	
