= Getting the Bird =

- Dad's Army episode
- Episode no.: Series 5 Episode 4
- Directed by: David Croft
- Story by: Jimmy Perry and David Croft
- Original air date: 27 October 1972
- Running time: 30 minutes

Episode chronology
← Previous "A Soldier's Farewell"	Next → "The Desperate Drive of Corporal Jones"

"Getting the Bird" is the fourth episode of the fifth series of the British television situation comedy Dad's Army. It was originally transmitted on 27 October 1972.

== Synopsis ==
Sergeant Wilson is missing from the platoon, and Frazer assumes there has been an argument between him and Mrs Pike. Godfrey comments that he spotted the Sergeant with his arm around an attractive and much younger woman.

== Plot ==
The episode begins with rumours abounding that Wilson has gone AWOL. Meanwhile, Jones is having troubles with his butcher's shop: shortages in rationed meat means his customers are getting more upset with him, which is affecting his mental health. Walker offers to give Jones a rabbit to skin (so he can sell the skin to a furrier), but Jones refuses as a single rabbit would make things worse, and confides he is desperate for off-the-ration meat.

The following evening, the platoon informs Captain Mainwaring that after a particularly heavy night drinking, Wilson was seen about town with a young woman (a Wren) on his arm. Pike reveals that Wilson and his mother had an argument about something, so he is not calling Wilson "Uncle Arthur" and will not take orders from him. However, Mainwaring informs Pike that unless he wants to be charged with insubordination, he will respect Wilson's position as Chief Clerk and Sergeant in the bank and on parade respectively.

During this discussion, Wilson is found in the church hall, asleep behind the stage curtain. While Mainwaring berates the still tipsy Wilson in his office, Wilson begins to see pigeons on Mainwaring's bookshelf. Both believe this to be the result of Wilson's drunken state until Pike enters the office and points them out. Immediately, the office is filled with pigeons. It emerges that Walker had stored the birds in the boiler room and they had escaped. Walker secretly proposes to Jones that he buy the pigeons to augment his supply of meat. Jones agrees and is persuaded to help Walker hide them in the church. However, Jones becomes suspicious when he hears on the radio that there is a sudden and unexplained shortage of pigeons in Trafalgar Square and ends the agreement.

On Sunday, Mainwaring and Frazer are welcoming people as they enter the church for the morning service when ARP Warden Hodges arrives and says to Frazer "I've been helping her (Mrs. Fox) with her blackout curtains". Just ahead of a church service, Frazer overhears a conversation between Wilson and the young woman wearing a Wrens uniform, where it is established that she is his daughter from a failed marriage before Wilson moved to Walmington-on-Sea. This is the reason for the argument between him and Mrs Pike: apparently it was a secret he had kept to himself. Wilson admits to Frazer that he has not seen much of her while she was growing up, but that he did his best to send her to a good school. Frazer replies that "she does you credit" and admits to Wilson that he knows he is prone to gossip but promises never to reveal Wilson's secret.

The hymns are ruined when the organ begins to play and dead pigeons are fired across the church: Walker is exposed as having hidden several of the pigeons in the organ pipes.

== Cast ==
- Arthur Lowe as Captain Mainwaring
- John Le Mesurier as Sergeant Wilson
- Clive Dunn as Lance Corporal Jones
- John Laurie as Private Frazer
- James Beck as Private Walker
- Arnold Ridley as Private Godfrey
- Ian Lavender as Private Pike
- Bill Pertwee as ARP Warden Hodges
- Edward Sinclair as The Verger
- Frank Williams as The Vicar
- Pamela Cundell as Mrs Fox
- Alvar Lidell as Newsreader
- Serretta Wilson as The Wren
