= Geographical Dictionary of the Kingdom of Poland =

Book by Filip Sulimierski

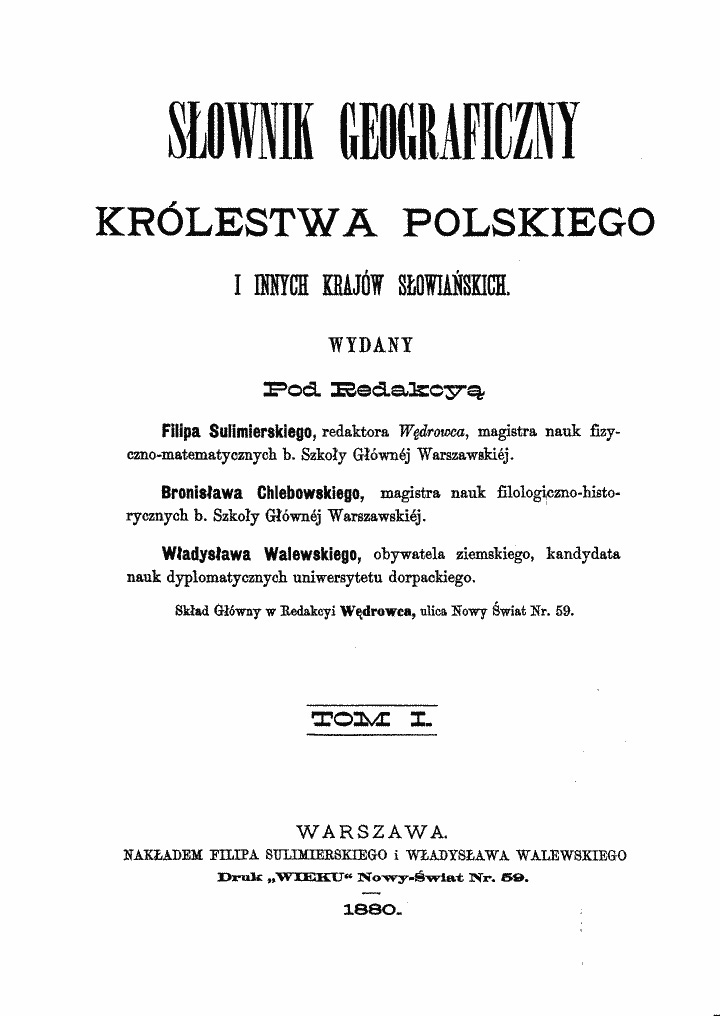
- Title page of the first edition
- Author: Filip Sulimierski, Bronisław Chlebowski, Władysław Walewski, et al.
- Original title: Słownik geograficzny Królestwa Polskiego i innych krajów słowiańskich
- Language: Polish
- Publication date: 1880–1902
- Publication place: Congress Poland
- Media type: Gazetteer
- Original text: Słownik geograficzny Królestwa Polskiego i innych krajów słowiańskich at Polish Wikisource

The Geographical Dictionary of the Kingdom of Poland and other Slavic Countries (Polish: Słownik geograficzny Królestwa Polskiego i innych krajów słowiańskich) is a monumental Polish gazetteer, published 1880–1902 in Warsaw by Filip Sulimierski, Bronisław Chlebowski, Władysław Walewski, and others.
