= Keep Young and Beautiful (Dad's Army) =

- Dad's Army episode
- Episode no.: Series 5 Episode 2
- Directed by: David Croft
- Story by: Jimmy Perry and David Croft
- Original air date: 13 October 1972
- Running time: 30 minutes

Episode chronology
← Previous "Asleep in the Deep"	Next → "A Soldier's Farewell"

"Keep Young and Beautiful" is the second episode of the fifth series of the British comedy series Dad's Army. It was originally transmitted on 13 October 1972.

== Synopsis ==
The government has called for an injection of youth into the Home Guard, along with a syphoning off of the more elderly of its current members into the ARP. When an exchange of personnel is mooted, the platoon decides to take drastic action: some dye their hair, others enrich their skin, Sergeant Wilson dons a corset and Captain Mainwaring a toupée.

== Plot ==
A field training exercise of the platoon tackling an obstacle course whilst carrying a pole ends in disaster as Corporal Jones' section, consisting of Privates Walker, Frazer, Pike and Godfrey, ends up falling in the water. Mainwaring later discusses with Wilson how he would prefer to have much younger men in his platoon. At that moment, Wilson presents Mainwaring with a letter from the War Office which states that the oldest members of the Home Guard will be transferred to ARP and the younger, fitter ARP Wardens will be transferred into the Home Guard. Mainwaring is appalled at the idea of losing his men and having members of Chief Warden Hodges' "rabble" in his platoon, but Wilson points out everyone is at risk.

Mainwaring worries that he too might be transferred into the ARP, so he buys himself a wig, while Wilson has acquired a corset (or "gentleman's abdominal support", as he calls it). They both try to hide it, but Mainwaring quickly figures out Wilson, who admits he is doing it not for vanity, but to stay with the unit. Mainwaring then shows off his wig, only for Wilson to start laughing uncontrollably. Members of the platoon start to notice odd things about Mainwaring, so when Mainwaring catches Pike trying to look under his cap, he decides to reveal his wig to the entire platoon. Unfortunately, when Mainwaring whips off his cap, the wig comes off with it so the platoon still see the normal Mainwaring, with Jones remarking "Personally, I think it makes him look older." Mainwaring also tells them of the upcoming parade where the Area Commander will decide who will be transferred.

Upon learning of this, Jones and Godfrey visit Frazer's funeral parlour late one night and tell him that "If any of the platoon are going to be put in the ARP, it'll be us three cause we're the oldest." Frazer then agrees to perform a makeover on Jones and Godfrey, as well as himself, in order to make them look younger. In the meantime, Hodges is also worried of being put into the Home Guard so he purchases some grey "hair dye" courtesy of Walker, which is actually white ceiling paint mixed with gum arabic. Hodges later showboats his makeover to the platoon, although Walker subtly laughs "Wait till he tries to get it off."

When Mainwaring learns of the drastic measures that Frazer, Jones and Godfrey have gone through to stay in the platoon, he does not approve, but states that "it's too late to do anything about it now." After the inspection, in which none of the Home Guard members were selected to join the ARP, Mainwaring is stunned when Colonel Pritchard quietly congratulates him for once again demonstrating initiative in a crisis, adding that he did not see anything. Moments later it begins to rain heavily, causing the makeup on the three soldiers' faces to run.

== Notes ==
- The title is a reference to the 1930s showtune of the same name. The version by Harry Roy is used in the episode.
- During the scene where Walker vigorously shakes a bottle to mix some "grey hair dye" for Hodges, he sings "I, Yi, Yi, Yi, Yi (I Like You Very Much)" – a song performed by Carmen Miranda in the film That Night in Rio (1941).
- Later television screenings of this episode have edited the scene where Pike, Frazer, Walker and Godfrey try to pick a volunteer to go into the office to have a look at Captain Mainwaring's new wig, and Pike recites a version of "Eeny, meeny, miny, moe" which briefly includes the racist slur "nigger" in the second line, with Walker getting the "moe"; Walker then continues the rhyme, "O-U-T spells out, you must go", so Pike ends up being "it" instead. In the revised version, only the rhyme's opening line is spoken by Pike before he points to Walker and says, "It's you, go on." The original scene appears on the DVD release.

== Cast ==
- Arthur Lowe as Captain Mainwaring
- John Le Mesurier as Sergeant Wilson
- Clive Dunn as Lance Corporal Jones
- John Laurie as Private Frazer
- James Beck as Private Walker
- Arnold Ridley as Private Godfrey
- Ian Lavender as Private Pike
- Bill Pertwee as ARP Warden Hodges
- Derek Bond as the Minister
- Robert Raglan as Colonel Pritchard
- James Ottaway as the first Member of Parliament
- Tom Mennard as Mess Orderly
- Charles Morgan as the second Member of Parliament
