= Portrait of Marie Walewska =

Painting by François Gérard

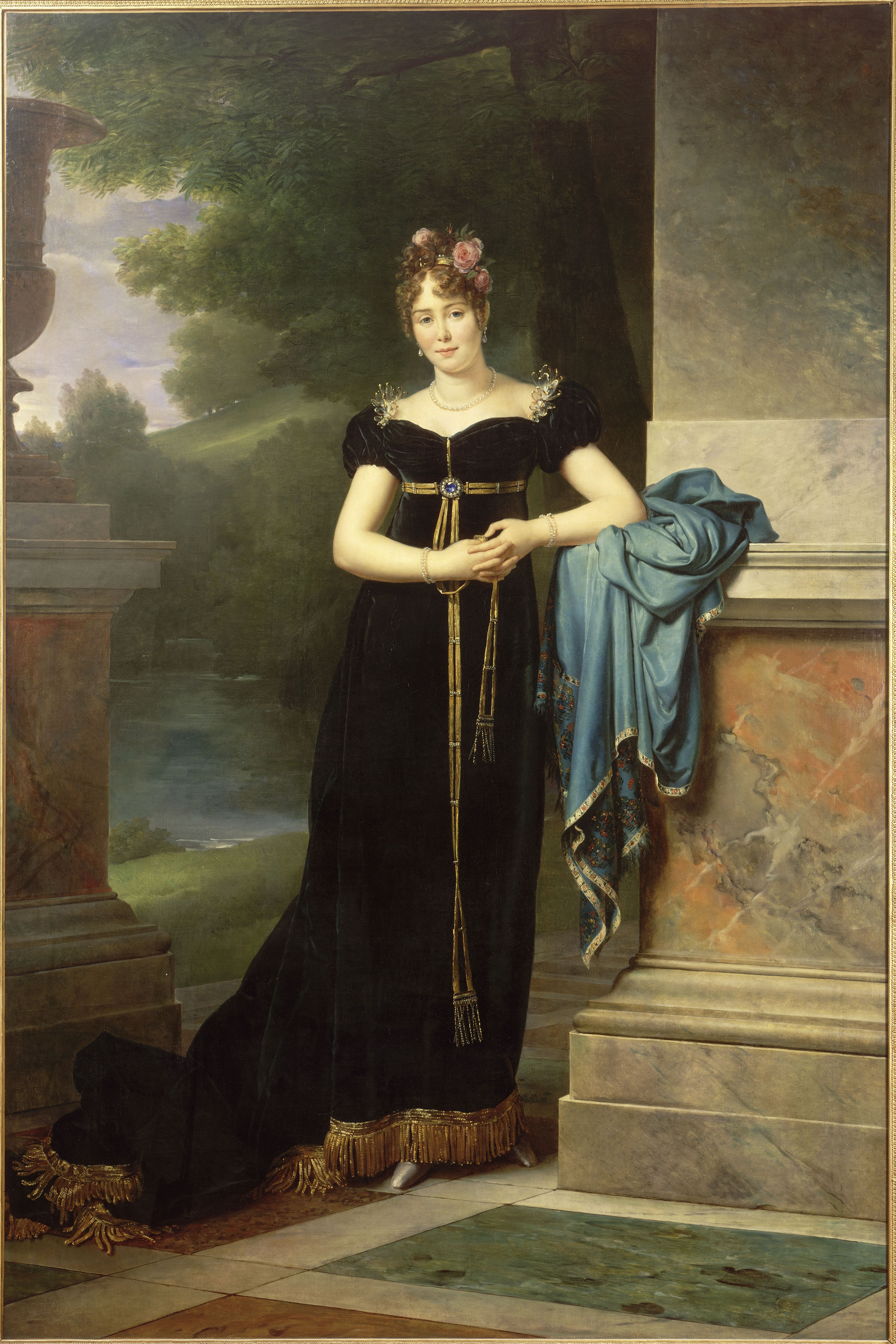
- Artist: François Gérard
- Year: 1810
- Type: Oil on canvas, portrait painting
- Dimensions: 241 cm × 162 cm (95 in × 64 in)
- Location: Army Museum; Paris

Portrait of Marie Walewska is an oil on canvas portrait painting by the French artist François Gérard, created in 1810. It depicts the Polish aristocrat Marie Walewska. She is best known as the mistress of the French Emperor Napoleon, with whom she had a son, Alexandre. The original painting is now in the Army Museum in Paris. A replica, produced in 1812, is in the Palace of Versailles, having been acquired in 1837 for the Musée de l'Histoire de France.

== Bibliography ==
- Casali, Dimitri & Chanteranne, David. Napoléon par les peintres. ISBN 2020987791. Seuil, 2009.
- Delorme, Eleanor P. Josephine: Napoleon's Incomparable Empress. ISBN 0810912295. Harry N. Abrams,2002.
