= Walewice =

- Village
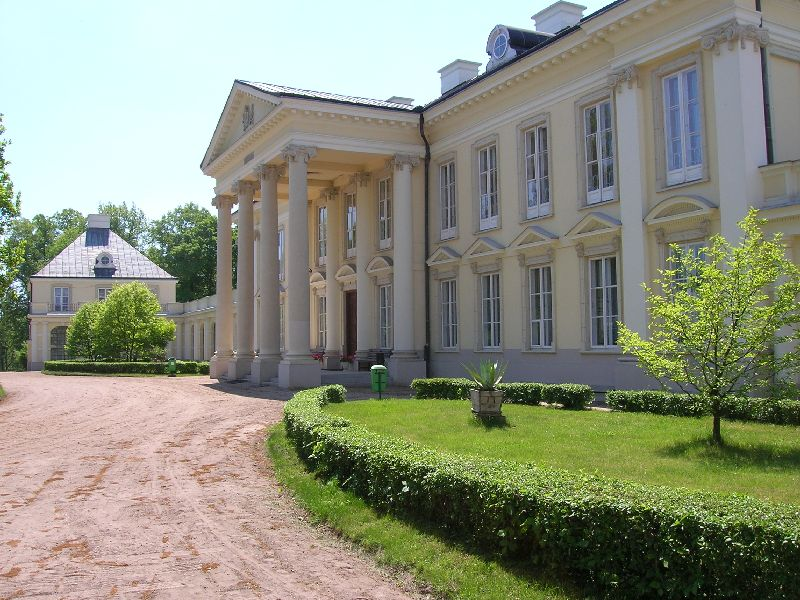
- Walewice palace

- Location within Poland
- Coordinates: 52°6′13″N 19°40′3″E
- Country: Poland
- Voivodeship: Łódź
- County: Łowicz
- Gmina: Bielawy

Walewice [valɛˈvit͡sɛ] is a village in the administrative district of Gmina Bielawy, within Łowicz County, Łódź Voivodeship, in central Poland, on the Bzura River.

It is the site of a 19th-century palace that belonged to Anastazy Colonna-Walewski, who was chamberlain of King Stanislaus Augustus Poniatowski. Walewice attracts tourists because Napoleon Bonaparte had a love affair with Countess Walewska, who bore their son, Alexandre Walewski, at the palace in Walewice.

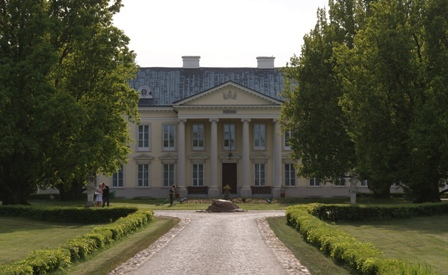
Front view of the palace

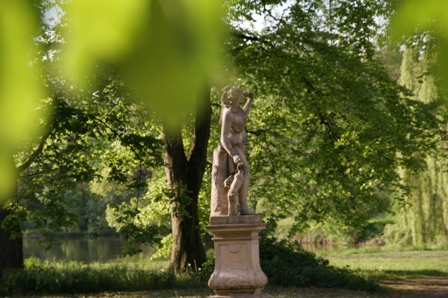
Details of the garden

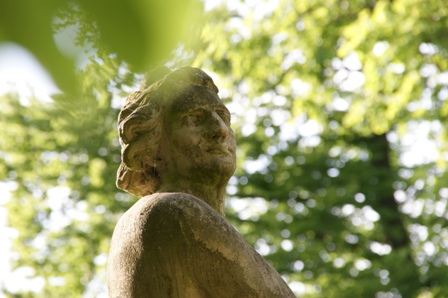
Details of the garden

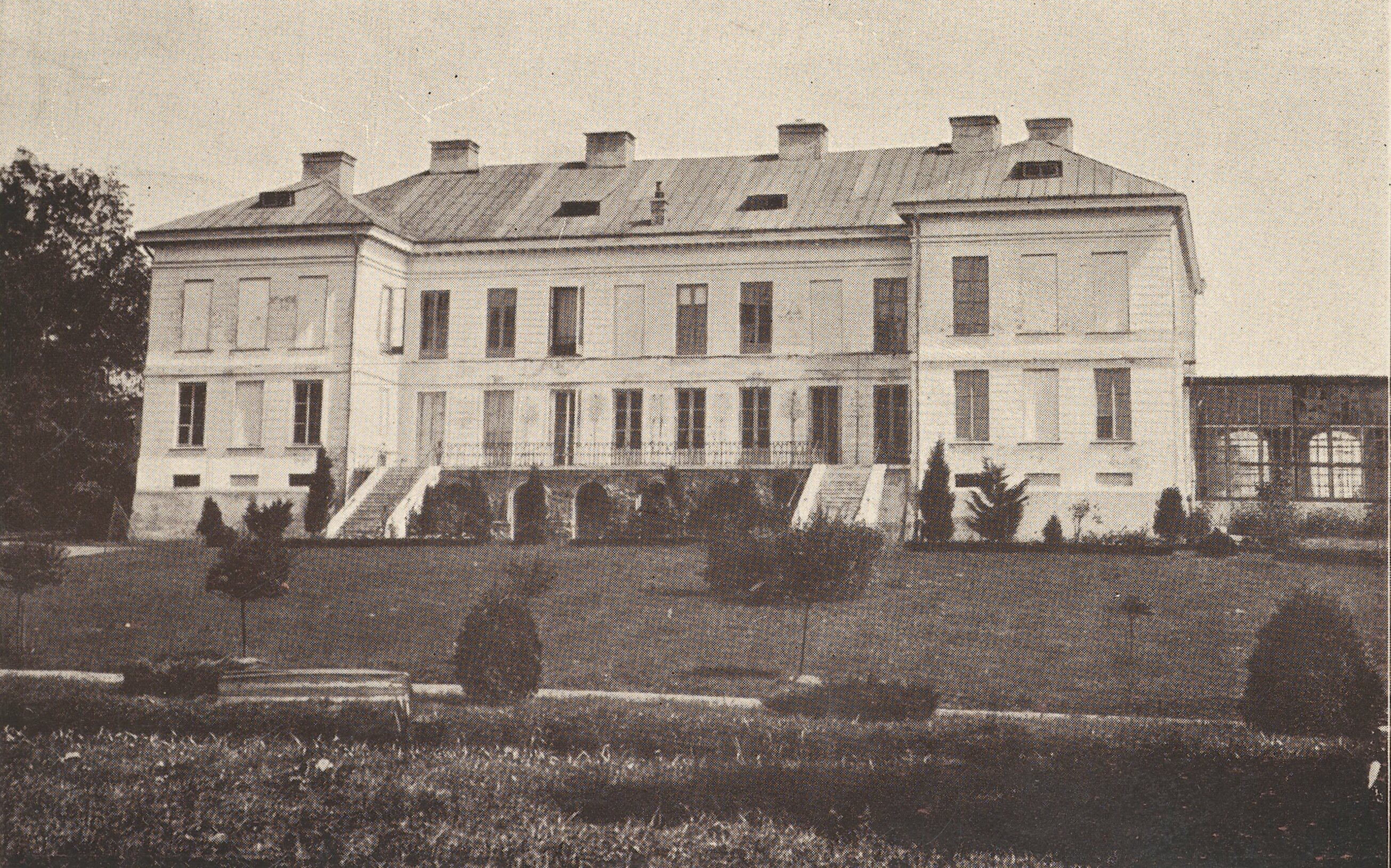
Palace before 1911
