= Philippe Antoine d'Ornano =

French soldier and politician

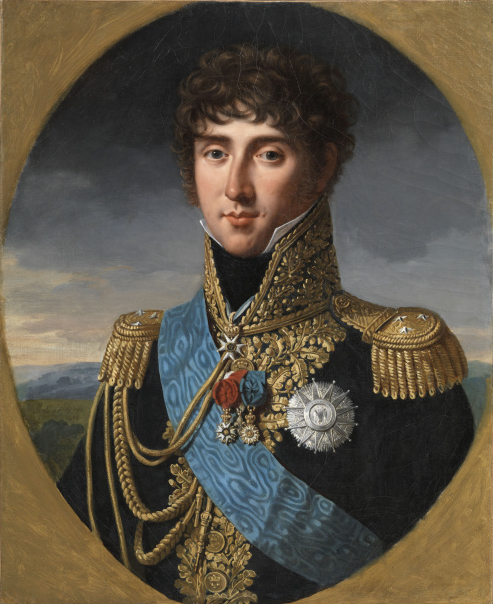
- Portrait by Robert Lefèvre, 1814

Personal details
- Born: Philippe Antoine d'Ornano; 17 January 1784 Ajaccio, Corsica
- Died: 13 October 1863 (aged 79)
- Spouse: Marie Walewska (m. 1816; died 1817)
- Children: Rodolphe-Auguste d'Ornano
- Parent(s): Lodovico Antonio d'Ornano; Isabella Maria Buonaparte

Military service
- Rank: Général de division
- Battles/wars: French Revolutionary Wars; Peninsular War; Battle of Fuentes de Oñoro; Russian Campaign; Battle of Borodino; Battle of Krasnoi

Philippe Antoine d'Ornano, Comte d'Ornano (French pronunciation: [filip ɑ̃twan dɔʁnano]; 17 January 1784 – 13 October 1863) was a French soldier and politician who fought in the French Revolutionary Wars and the Napoleonic Wars. He was made a Marshal of France in 1861.

== Early life ==
D'Ornano was born in Ajaccio, Corsica on January 17, 1784. He was a son of Lodovico Antonio d'Ornano and Isabella Maria Buonaparte. His paternal grandparents were Filippo Antonio d'Ornano and the former Maria Geronima Maggioco. His maternal grandparents were the former Maria Rosa da Bozzi and Napoleone Buonaparte, making him a second cousin of Napoleon Bonaparte.

== Career ==
D'Ornano served in Italy during the French Revolutionary Wars (in 1798 and 1799), and later took part in the Saint-Domingue expedition. He served in the campaigns of the Napoleonic Wars from 1805 on, and was made a Count of the Empire in 1808. He commanded the 5th Dragoon regiment during the Battle of Fuentes de Oñoro, after a brave attack of cavalry, he was promoted to brigadier general.

He returned to France and took part in the Russian campaign of 1812. At the Battle of Borodino, d'Ornano was promoted to général de division. D'Ornano was wounded at the Battle of Krasnoi.

In 1813, after the death of Marshal Jean-Baptiste Bessières, he commanded the cavalry of the Imperial Guard. He accompanied Napoleon to the south of France until the emperor embarked for Elba, and was exiled from France by the Bourbon Restoration.

=== Restoration, July Monarchy, and Second Empire ===
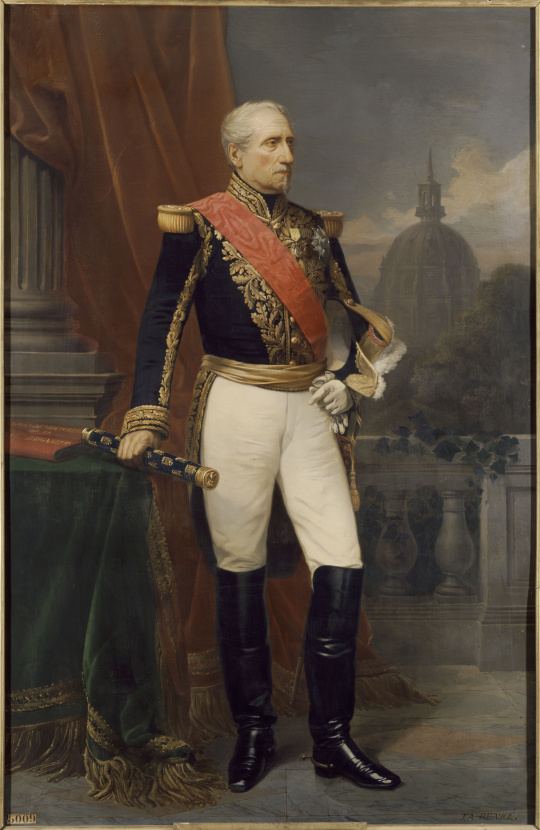
Portrait by Jean-Adolphe Beaucé, 1863

He returned to France and resumed active service in 1829 when he was given a position at the Military Academy of Saint-Cyr. In 1830, after the July Revolution, he was given command of the 4th military division at Tours. Two years later, he suppressed revolts in the Vendée after which he was made a Peer of France. In 1848 he served as head of the 14th military division until he resigned for reasons of health.

In 1849, d'Ornano was elected to the National Assembly as a member for the département of Indre-et-Loire. During the Second Empire, he was made a Senator and a Grand Cross in the Légion d'honneur. After the death of Rémy Joseph Isidore Exelmans, he was appointed Chancellor of the order. In 1853 he was made Governor of Les Invalides. At the age of seventy seven, he was made a Marshal of France by Napoléon III.

== Personal life ==
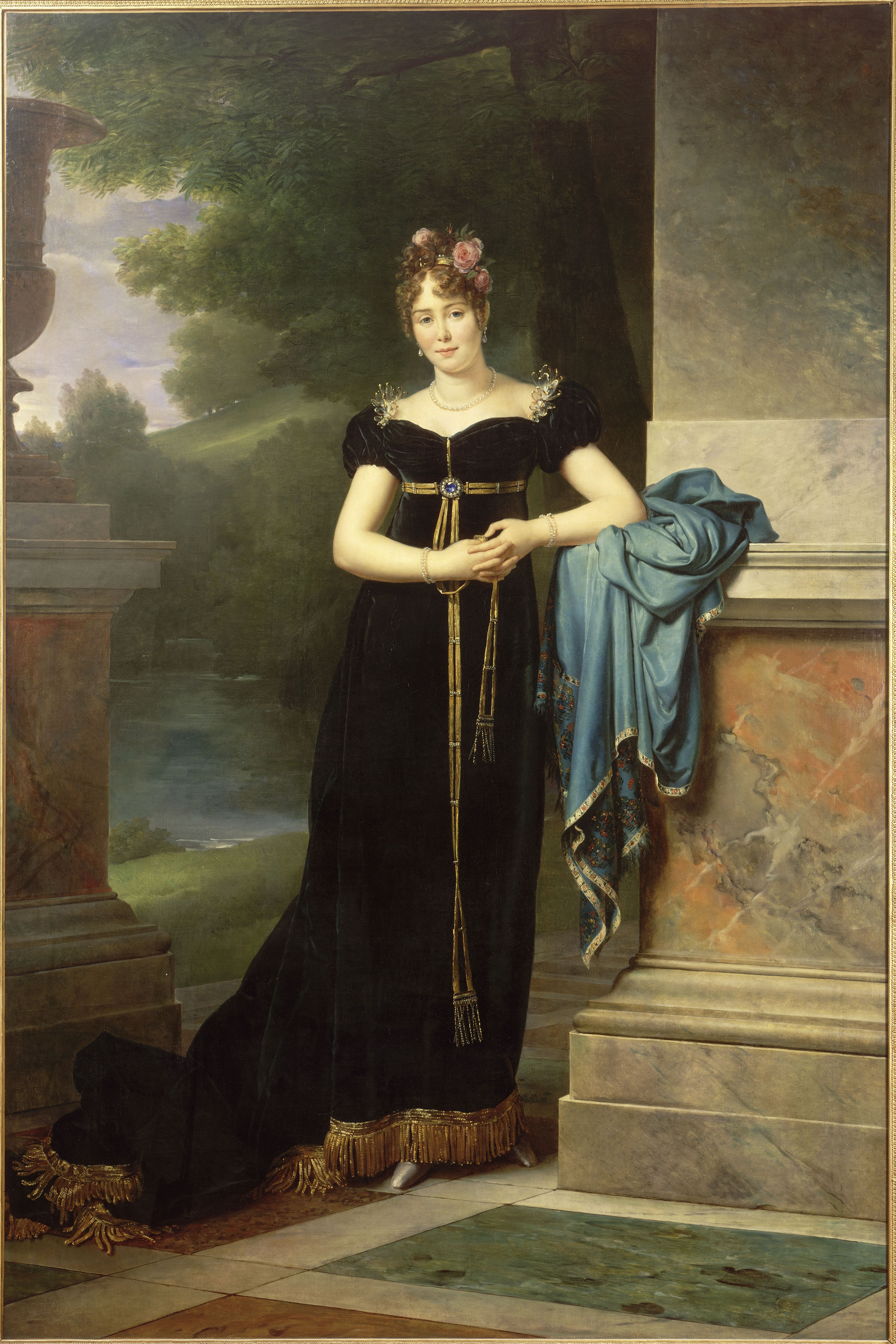
Portrait of Marie Walewska by François Gérard, 1810

In 1816, d'Ornano married his longtime lover, Countess Marie Walewska (née Łączyńska), the former wife of Count Athenasius Colonna-Walewski, whom she divorced in 1812. After their marriage, they settled in Liège as d'Ornano did not want to return to Paris due to his pro-Napoleonic allegiances. From her prior marriage, she had several children, including Count Antoni Colonna-Walewski. Another son, rumoured to be from her relationship with Napoleon, was Count Alexandre Joseph Colonna-Walewski. Before her death during childbirth in 1817, they had a son, Rodolphe-Auguste d'Ornano: The line of Counts d'Ornano was continued by his only son and exists until the present day.

After the death of his wife, her heart was placed in the crypt of the d'Ornano family at Père Lachaise Cemetery in Paris and her body was brought back to Poland for burial. (Note: In 1869, however, her coffin was found to be empty. It was speculated that some unknown necrophile had removed her remains.) He died in Vincennes, a suburb of Paris, in 1863.

== Ancestry ==
Ancestors of Philippe Antoine d'Ornano

8. Ludovico d'Ornano
4. Filippo Antonio d'Ornano
9. Marfisa da Monticchi
2. Ludovico Antonio d'Ornano
10. Giuseppe Maggioco
5. Maria Geronima Maggioco
1. Philippe Antoine d'Ornano, 1st Comte d'Ornano
12. Sebastiano Nicola Buonaparte
6. Napoleone Buonaparte
13. Maria-Anna Tusoli di Bocognano
3. Isabella Maria Buonaparte
14. Giovanni Battista da Bozzi
7. Maria Rosa da Bozzi
15. Maria Boggiano
