= Alexandre Colonna-Walewski =

Polish-French politician and diplomat (1810–1868)

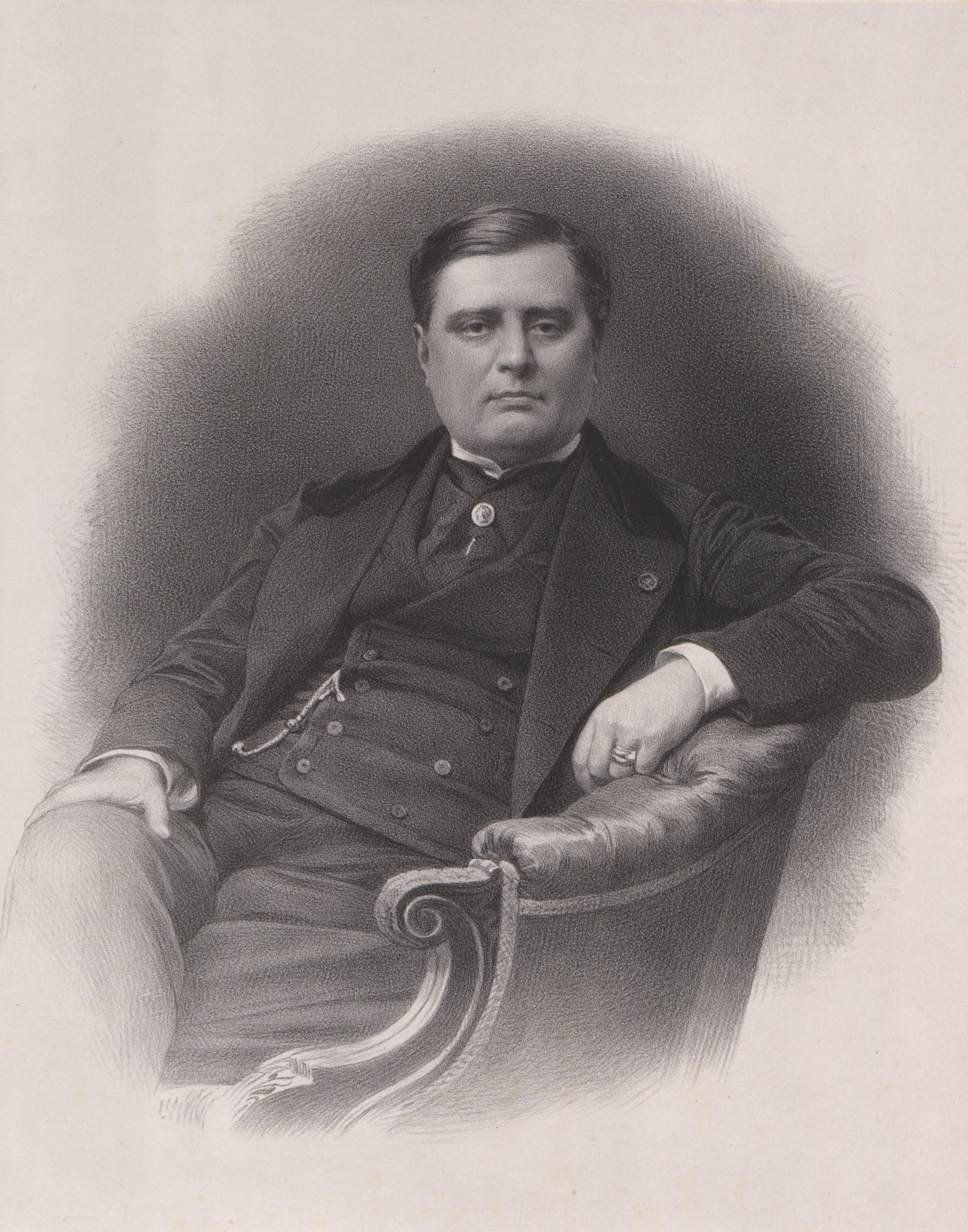
- Colonna-Walewski in 1860

Minister of Foreign Affairs
- In office 7 May 1855 – 4 January 1860
- Monarch: Napoleon III
- Preceded by: Édouard Drouyn de Lhuys
- Succeeded by: Jules Baroche

Personal details
- Born: Aleksander Florian Józef Colonna-Walewski; 4 May 1810 Walewice, Duchy of Warsaw
- Died: 27 September 1868 (aged 58) Strasbourg, France
- Spouse: Lady Catherine Montagu (m. 1831; d. 1834) Marie-Anne di Ricci (m. 1846)
- Parents: Napoleon (father); Marie Walewska (mother)

Alexandre Florian Joseph, Count Colonna-Walewski (French pronunciation: [alɛksɑ̃dʁ kɔlɔna valɛvski]; Polish: Aleksander Florian Józef Colonna-Walewski; 4 May 1810 – 27 September 1868), also Count of the Empire, was a Polish and French politician and diplomat, the unacknowledged son of French emperor Napoleon I.

He is best known for his position as foreign minister of France under his cousin Napoleon III and for his diplomatic efforts presiding over the Congress of Paris, which ended the Crimean War and laid the base for modern international law of the sea with the Paris Declaration Respecting Maritime Law.

== Early years ==
Alexandre Walewski in 1832, portrait by school of George Hayter

Alexandre Florian Joseph Colonna Walewski was born on May 4, 1810, at Walewice, near Warsaw, to Countess Maria Walewska, the Polish noblewoman and mistress of Napoleon Bonaparte. His mother conceived him while residing near Schönbrunn Palace in Vienna, where Napoleon was temporarily staying. When Marie requested to give birth in Paris, Napoleon insisted she return to her husband's estate in Poland. Count Athanasius Walewski, nearly eighty years old at the time, legally recognized the child as his own. Later in life, Alexandre would write: "My birth was accompanied by lightning and thunder, and it was predicted that my life would be stormy and even life-changing. To satisfy an old family prejudice, I was held at the font by two beggars, which was supposed to bring me luck..."

In 2013, published scholarship comparing DNA haplotype evidence taken from Emperor Napoleon, from his brother King Jérôme Bonaparte's descendant Charles, Prince Napoléon and from Colonna-Walewski's descendant indicated Alexandre's membership in the genetic male-line of the imperial House of Bonaparte.

Upon hearing of Alexandre's birth while in Belgium with his new bride, Empress Marie Louise, Napoleon sent an affectionate message and a gift of Brussels laces to Marie Walewska congratulating the birth of the child. Despite the ending of their affair when he married Marie Louise, Napoleon ensured Marie and their son were well provided for, granting them a residence in Rue de Montmorency in Paris along with a significant pension of 120,000 francs.

According to Napoleon's valet, Constant, Napoleon was deeply moved by the boy's resemblance to him. Constant recorded:

"She was delivered of a son who bore a striking resemblance to His Majesty. This was a great joy for the Emperor. Hastening to her as soon as it was possible for him to get away from the chateau, he took the child in his arms, and embracing it as he had just embraced the mother, he said to him: I will make thee a count."

On May 5, 1812, Napoleon officially decreed Alexandre a “Count of the French Empire” and bestowed upon him lands in the Kingdom of Naples. The young Alexandre's endowment included sixty-nine farms generating an annual income of 169,516 francs. On June 15, while in Königsberg Napoleon signed letters patent confirming Alexandre's title, and his new coat of arms combined the insignias of the Walewski and Laczynski families. While in Paris, his mother Marie Walewska became close friends with the former Empress Joséphine frequently visiting her at Malmaison. Joséphine, who had no children with Napoleon, lavished Marie and young Alexandre with kindness and gifts.

Following Napoleon's abdication in 1814, Marie took four-year-old Alexandre to the island of Elba. Many islanders mistook Marie Walewska for Empress Marie Louise and Alexandre for the King of Rome. During their stay, Napoleon played games with the boy and shared affectionate moments.

Napoleon reportedly asked Alexandre:

“ I hear you don't mention my name in your prayers." Alexandre admitted he did not, but he did remember to say "Papa Empereur." Amused, Napoleon remarked, "He'll be a great social success, this boy: he's got wit."

Napoleon's physician, Foureau de Beauregard, later wrote to Alexandre, recalling:"You are that pretty little Alexandre that I saw, almost twenty-nine years ago, on the Emperor's lap near the Madonna delle Grazie on the island of Elba."

However, with Empress Marie Louise expected to visit, Napoleon discreetly arranged for Marie and Alexandre to leave the island to avoid scandal. In early 1815, they returned to Paris before Napoleon departed for the Hundred Days campaign. After his defeat at Waterloo, Marie Walewska and Alexandre were present at Malmaison to bid farewell to Napoleon before his exile to Saint Helena. Years later, Alexandre reminisced:

I can still see the Emperor... every single feature of his face.... He took me in his arms and I remember a tear ran down his face..But I cannot recall what exactly he said to me on that occasion.

In his final will, Napoleon mentioned both Alexandre and his half-brother, Charles Léon, stating:

"Would not be displeased if little Léon were to enter the judiciary, if that appeals to him. I would like Alexandre Walewski to enter the service of France as a soldier.”

On September 7, 1816, Marie Walewska married Napoleon's cousin, Philippe Antoine d'Ornano, who had been exiled in Brussels for supporting Napoleon during the Hundred Days. Alexandre and his younger half-brother, Antoine, remained in Paris under the care of Marie's trusted friend, M. Carite. The family later moved to Liège, where Marie gave birth to another son, Rodolphe, in 1817. Marie died on December 11, 1817. In her will, she entrusted the care of Alexandre and Antoine to her brother Theodore Łaczyński while their half brother Rodolphe stayed with his father.

Łaczyński took the boys to Kiernozia in Poland. Alexandre’s uncle would teach them of the French Revolution, the Napoleonic campaigns and of Emperor Napoleon and his court. Expressing his dream to take them to Saint Helena when they were older. To give them an education, Łaczyński would send them to Warsaw, where they studied under a tutor with strong republican and anti-Napoleon views. Łaczyński concerned about this influence, placed them instead in a Jesuit college, where Alexandre made his first communion. In 1820, at the age of ten, Alexandre left Poland for Geneva, where he attended boarding school for four years.

At age fourteen, Walewski refused to join the Imperial Russian army and fled to London, thence to Paris, where the French government refused Tsar Alexander I's demands for his extradition to Russia.

Upon the accession of Louis-Philippe d'Orléans to the French throne in 1830, Walewski was dispatched to Poland, later the same year being entrusted by the leaders of the Polish November Uprising of 1830 as a diplomatic envoy to the Court of St James's. After the Fall of Warsaw, he took out letters of French naturalization and joined the French Army, being in action in Algeria as a Captain in the Chasseurs d'Afrique of the French Foreign Legion.

In 1837 he resigned his commission to begin writing plays and working as a journalist for the press. He is said to have collaborated with the elder Dumas on Mademoiselle de Belle-Isle and a comedy of his, L'Ecole du monde, was produced at the Theâtre Français in 1840.

== Diplomatic career ==
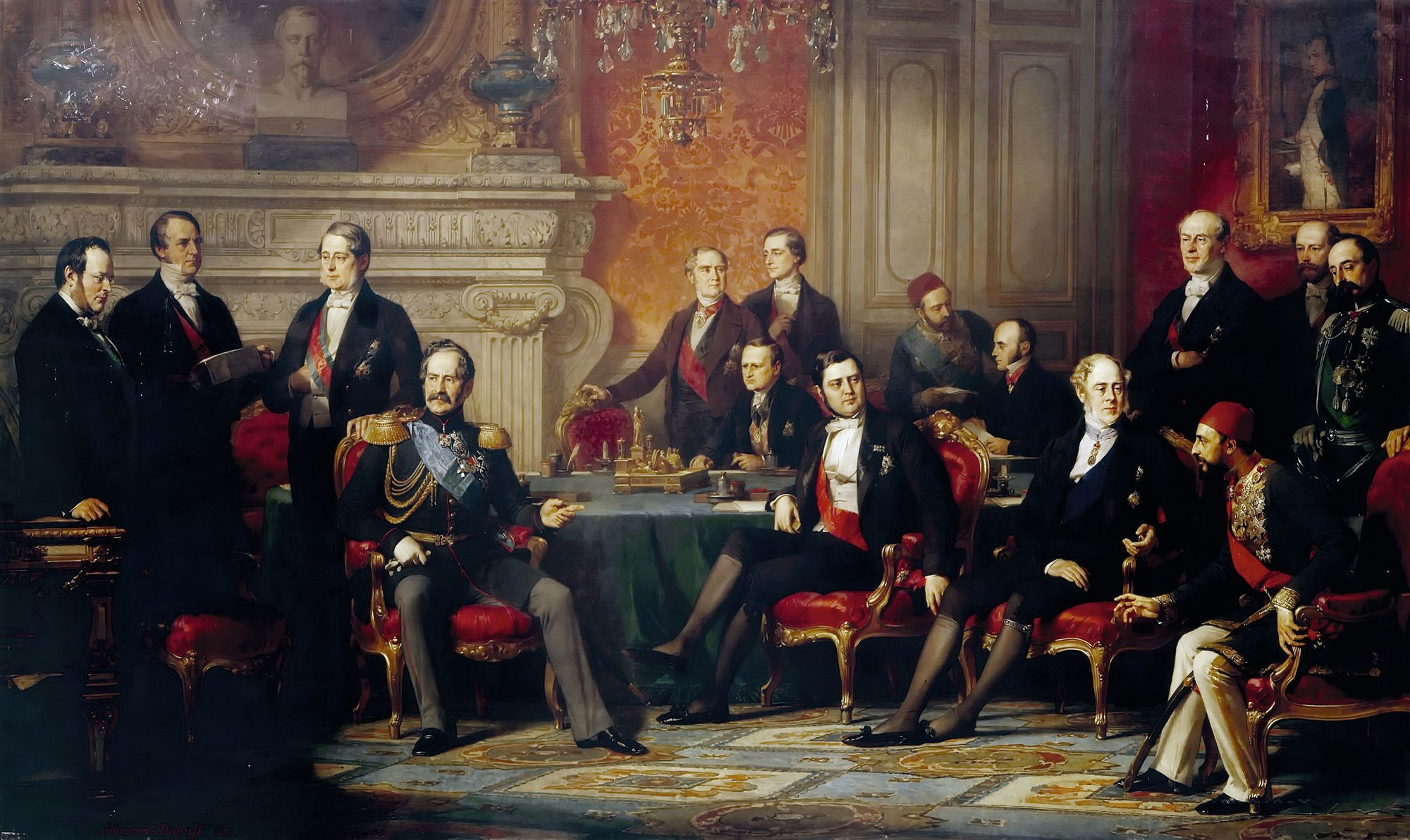
Walewski and other participants at Crimean War peace negotiations, 1856 – The Congress of Paris by Edouard Dubufe

Later that year the prime minister of France Thiers, also a man of letters, became patron to one of Walewski's papers, Le Messager des Chambres, before sending him on a mission to Egypt. Under Guizot's government Walewski was posted to Buenos Aires to liaise with the British Ambassador, John Cradock, 1st Baron Howden. Prince Louis Napoleon's accession to power in France as Napoleon III furthered his career with postings as envoy extraordinary to Florence, Grand Duchy of Tuscany, and the Kingdom of the Two Sicilies before London (1851–55), where he was charged with announcing the coup d'état to the prime minister, Lord Palmerston.

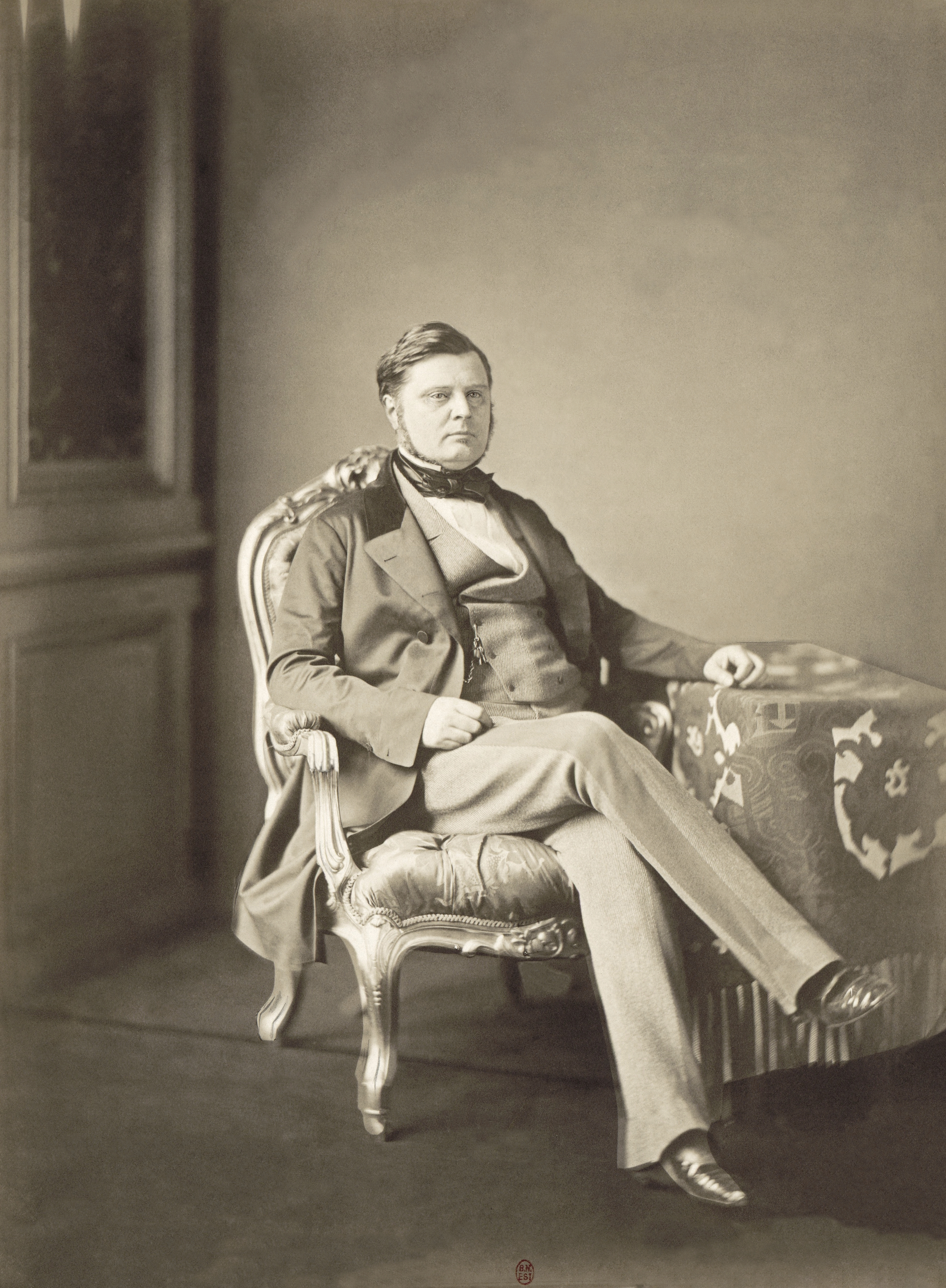
Count Walewski as president of Congress of Paris (1856)

In 1855, Walewski succeeded Drouyn de Lhuys as Minister of Foreign Affairs and he acted as President of, and French plenipotentiary at, the Congress of Paris the following year, leading to peace in the Crimean War and to the Paris Declaration Respecting Maritime Law. The latter treaty did contain an important novelty in international law, creating the possibility for nations that were not involved in the establishment of the agreement, to become a party by acceding to the Declaration afterwards.

As foreign minister, Walewski advocated a de-escalating strategy towards Russia, known as entente, opposing his emperor's strategy in Italy which led to war with Austria in 1859. After leaving the Foreign Ministry in 1860 he became France's Minister of State, an office which he held until 1863. He served as Senator from 1855 to 1865, before being appointed to the Corps Législatif in 1865 and as President of the Chamber of Deputies by the Emperor, who returned him to the Senate after a revolt against his authority two years later.

Walewski was made a Duke of the Empire ad personam in 1866, was elected a member of the Académie des beaux-arts, appointed Grand-Cross of the Imperial Order of the Legion of Honour and made a Knight of the Sovereign Military Order of Malta, also receiving the Gold Cross of Virtuti Militari.

Alexandre Colonna-Walewski died of a stroke at Strasbourg on 27 September 1868 and is buried at Père Lachaise Cemetery in Paris.

== Descendants ==
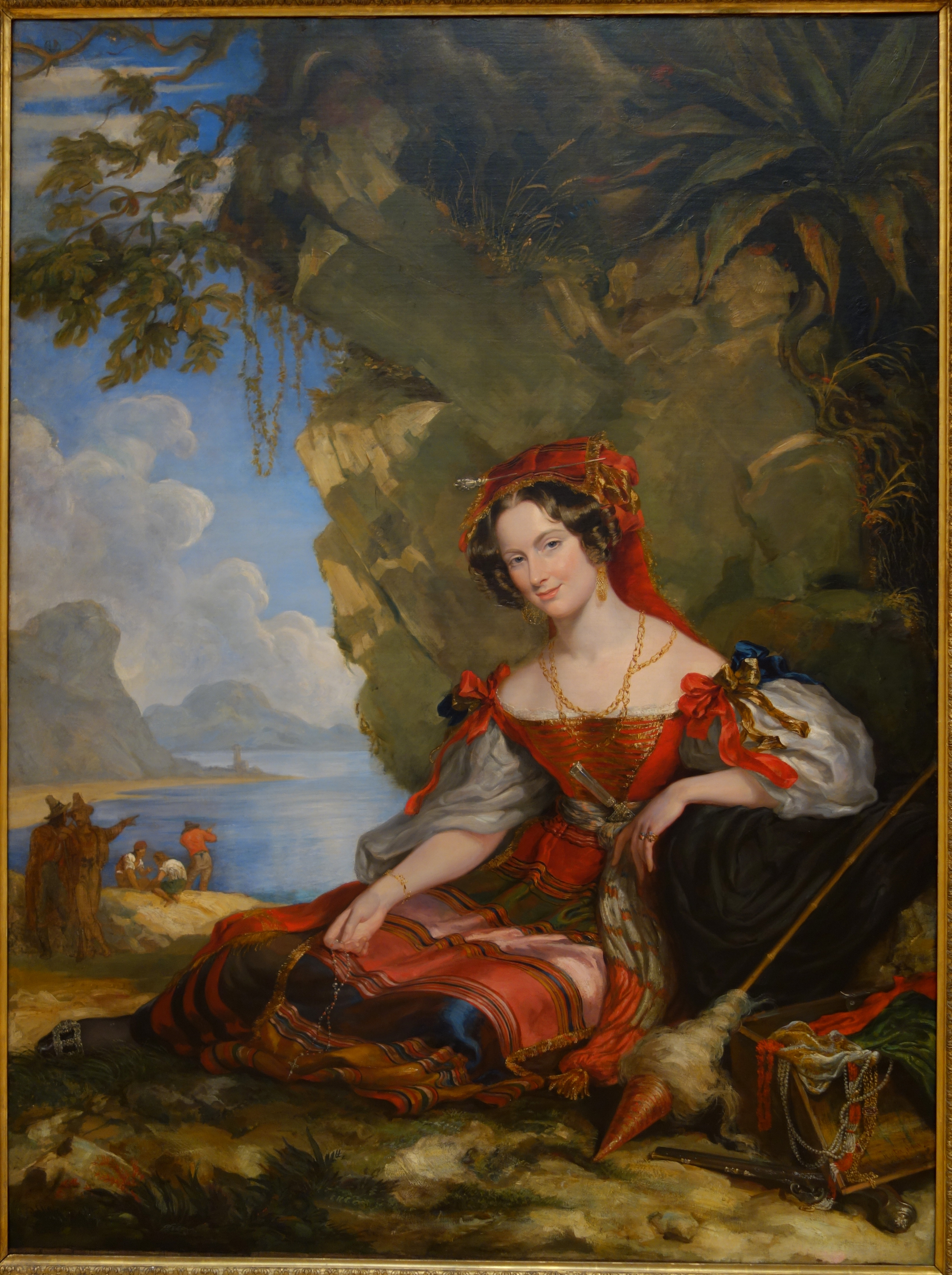
Portrait of Lady Caroline Montagu in Byronic Costume by George Hayter, 1831.

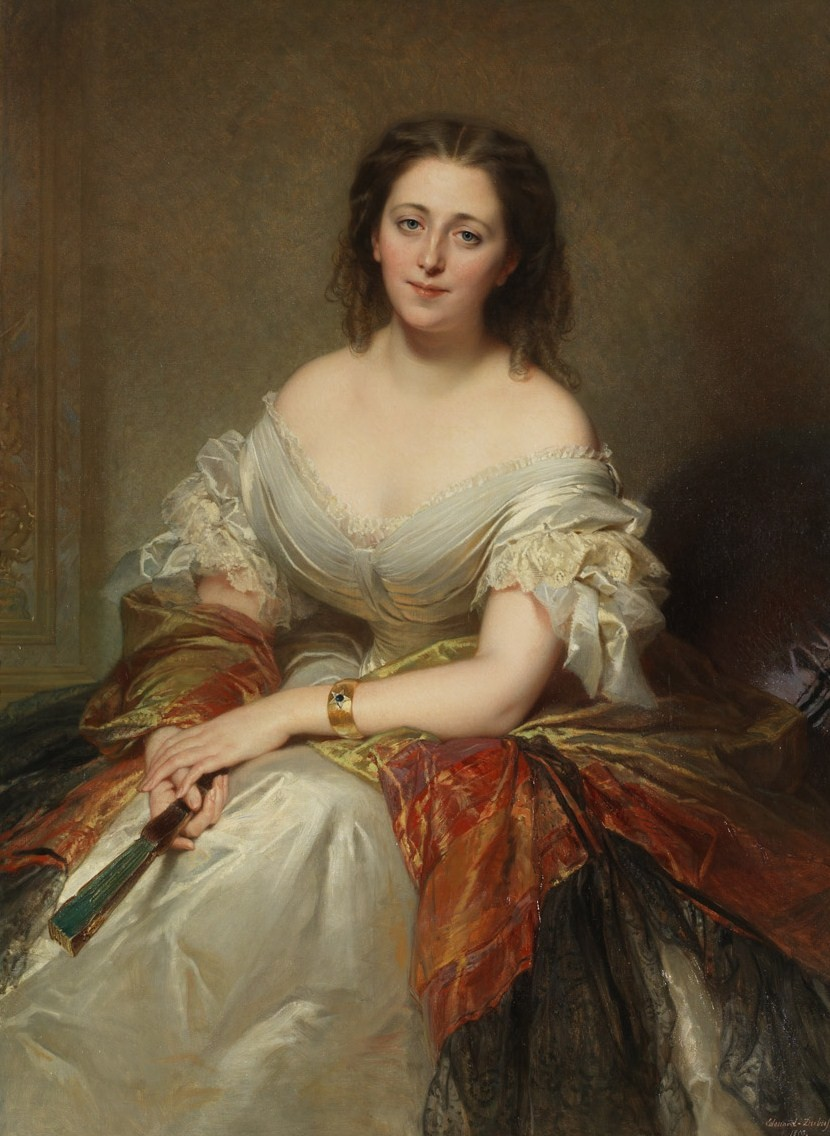
Marie-Anne Walewska, born Ricci, by Edouard Louis Dubufe, 1859.

He married firstly in London on 1 December 1831 Lady Catherine Montagu (London, 7 October 1808 – Paris, 30 April 1834), daughter of George Montagu, 6th Earl of Sandwich, by his wife Lady Louisa Lowry-Corry. Following her death in childbirth, he married secondly, on 4 June 1846 in Florence, Maria Anna di Ricci (Florence, 18 July 1823 - Paris, 18 November 1912), daughter of the Papal Count Zanobi di Ricci by his wife Princess Isabella Poniatowski.

He had seven children, two from his first marriage, four from his second marriage, and one illegitimate child.

- By Lady Catherine Montagu,:
  - Louise-Marie Colonna-Walewska (14 December 1832 - 1833).
  - Count Georges-Édouard-Auguste Colonna-Walewski (Paris, 30 April 1834 - Paris, 9 May 1835).
- By Maria Anna di Ricci:
  - Isabelle Colonna-Walewska (Buenos Aires, 12 May 1847 – Buenos Aires, 2 July 1847; it is believed that she is buried in La Recoleta Cemetery).
  - Count Charles-Zanobi-Rodolphe Colonna-Walewski (Florence, 4 June 1848 – died on active service, Villers-Cotterêts, 2 October 1916), married in Orléans on 11 June 1885 Félicie Douay (Paris, 29 November 1860 – Versailles, 10 August 1952); no children.
  - Élise Colonna-Walewska (Florence, 15 December 1849 – Paris, 14 March 1927) married in Paris on 10 October 1871 Félix, Count of Bourqueney (Constantinople, 25 April 1847 - La Chartre-sur-le-Loir, 17 June 1912); leaving issue.
  - Eugénie Colonna-Walewska (Paris, 30 March 1856 – Arcachon, 22 December 1884), married in Paris on 15 July 1875 Frédéric, Count Mathéus (Écouis, 20 July 1846 - Paris, 25 February 1929); leaving issue.
- By Rachel Felix (1821–1858):
  - Count Alexandre-Antoine-Jean Colonna-Walewski (Marly-le-Roi, 3 November 1844 – Turin, 20 August 1898), recognized in 1844 and adopted by Walewski in 1860; Consul General of France; married in Paris on 17 November 1868 Jeanne-Claire-Marie Sala (Paris, 26 May 1845 - Palermo, 22 January 1881); has numerous surviving descendants.

== Honours ==
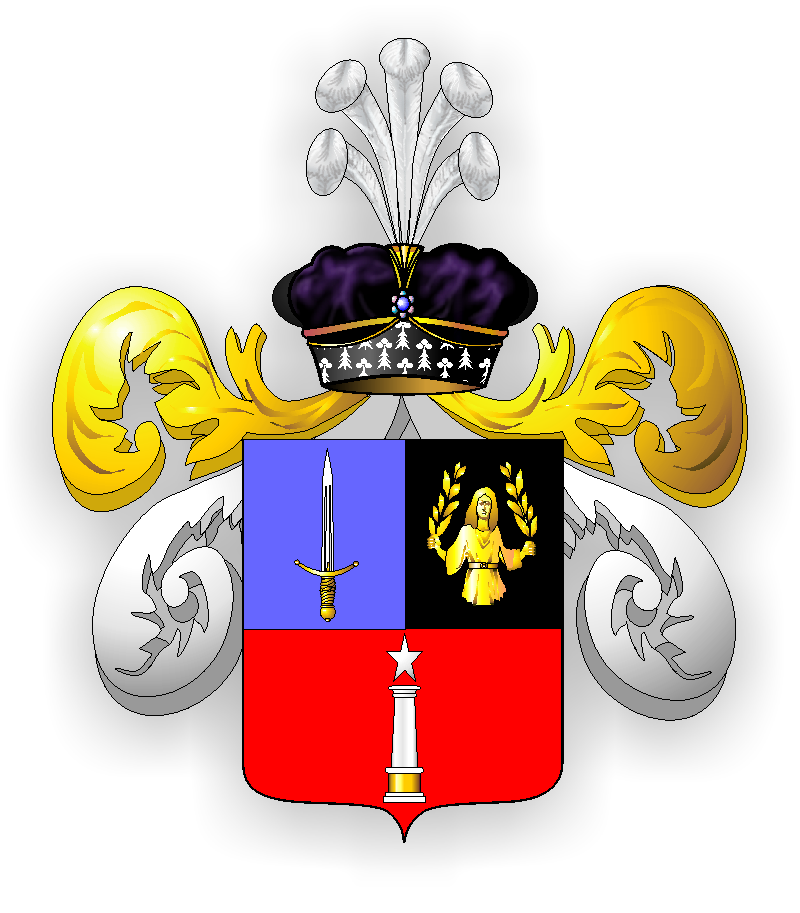
Arms of Colonna-Walewski

- Poland: Knight of the Golden Cross of the Order of Virtuti Militari (3 March 1831)
- Sovereign Order of Malta: Knight of the Cross of Honor and Devotion of the Knights of Malta
- France: Grand Ribbon of the Imperial Order of the Legion of Honor
- France: Grand Officer of the Imperial Order of the Legion of Honor
- France: Commander of the National Order of the Legion of Honor
- Denmark: Great Ribbon of the Order of the Danebrog
- Kingdom of the Two Sicilies: Grand Ribbon of the Order of Saint Januarius
- Kingdom of Sardinia: Grand Ribbon of the Order of Saints Maurice and Lazarus
- Grand Duchy of Tuscany: Grand Ribbon of the Order of St. Joseph
- Kingdom of Portugal: Grand Ribbon of the Order of Vila Viçosa
- Ottoman Empire: Grand Ribbon of the Order of the Medjids
- Kingdom of Greece: Great Ribbon of the Order of the Savior
- Kingdom of Bavaria: Grand Ribbon of the Order of St. Hubert
- Austria-Hungary: Grand Ribbon of the Order of St. Stefan
- Sweden: Great Ribbon of the Order of the Seraphim
- Netherlands: Grand Ribbon of the Order of the Netherlands Lion
- Baden: Great Ribbon of the Order of Fidelity
- Belgium: Grand Ribbon of the Order of Leopold
- Prussia: Great Ribbon of the Order of the Black Eagle
- Russian Empire: Grand Ribbon of the Order of St. Anna

== Works ==
- Un mot sur la question d'Afrique, Paris 1837
- L'Alliance Anglaise, Paris 1838
- L'École du Monde, ou la Coquette sans le savoir (comedy), Paris 1840

== See also ==
- List of Poles

Political offices
Preceded by Édouard Drouyn de Lhuys	Ambassadors of France to the United Kingdom; 1851–1855	Succeeded by Jean Gilbert Victor Fialin, duc de Persigny
Preceded by Édouard Drouyn de Lhuys	Foreign Minister of France; 1855–1860	Succeeded by Jules Baroche
Preceded by Achille Fould	Minister of State of France; 1860–1863	Succeeded by Adolphe Billault
Preceded by Charles de Morny	Président du Corps législatif 1865–1867	Succeeded by Eugène Schneider
