= Marie Walewska =

Polish countess (1787–1817)

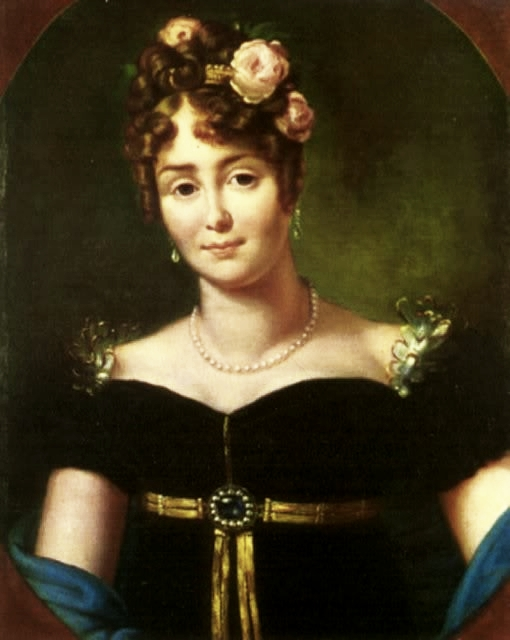
- Portrait by François Gérard
- Born: 7 December 1786; Kiernozia, Poland
- Died: 11 December 1817 (aged 31); Paris, France
- Resting place: Père Lachaise Cemetery
- Spouse(s): Athenasius, Count Colonna-Walewski (1805–1812); 1 child Philippe Antoine d'Ornano (1816–1817, her death); 1 child
- Partner(s): Napoleon I Bonaparte (1806–1810); 1 child
- Children: Count Antoni Rudolf Bazyli Colonna-Walewski; Count Alexandre Joseph Colonna-Walewski; Rodolphe-Auguste d'Ornano
- Parent(s): Count Mathieu (Mateusz) Łączyński; Eva Zaborowska

Marie Walewska, Countess Walewska (Polish: Maria Walewska; née Łączyńska; 7 December 1786 – 11 December 1817) was a Polish noblewoman in the court of Napoleon I who used her influence to sway the emperor towards the creation of an independent Polish state. In her later years she married count Philippe Antoine d'Ornano, an influential Napoleonic officer.

== Early life ==
Walewska was born as first child into a wealthy noble family in Kiernozia, to Mathieu (Mateusz) Łączyński, a landowner and starosta of Gostyń; and Eva Zaborowska, whose family was wealthy as well. Walewska had six siblings: Benedykt Jozef, Hieronim, Teodor, Honorata, Katarzyna and Urszula-Teresa. She grew up in her ancestral home, Kiernozia palace, where she received an upper-class education. Nicholas Chopin, Frédéric Chopin's father, for instance, was one of her tutors.

In 1794 her father participated in the military struggle for Polish independence and was mortally wounded at the Battle of Maciejowice, leaving behind a widow, seven children (five of them surviving into adulthood), and a dwindling livelihood.

A year later Prussia, the Habsburg monarchy and the Russian Empire effectively ended the Polish-Lithuanian Commonwealth's national sovereignty through the third partition of Poland, when the Łączyński lands were incorporated into Prussia.

As the eldest, with her brothers having debts, it was up to her to secure the future of her family. At the age of eighteen she was married by her mother to the sixty-eight-year-old Athanasius, Count Colonna-Walewski, a wealthy landowner, starosta of Warka district and a once-chamberlain to the last Polish king, Stanisław August Poniatowski. During their marriage Walewska had two sons, Antoni Rudolf Bazyli, born 14 June 1805 (a little over 7 months after his mother's 18th birthday and no more than as many months into the marriage), and Alexandre Florian Joseph Colonna-Walewski. Antoni was immediately seized by Marie’s sister-in-law and nieces (by marriage), who were a lot older than the young countess.

Historians have theorized that Alexandre was a natural son of Napoleon I, although Athanasius legally acknowledged him as his own son. In 2013, DNA research supported this belief, indicating Alexandre's membership in the genetic male-line of the imperial House of Bonaparte.

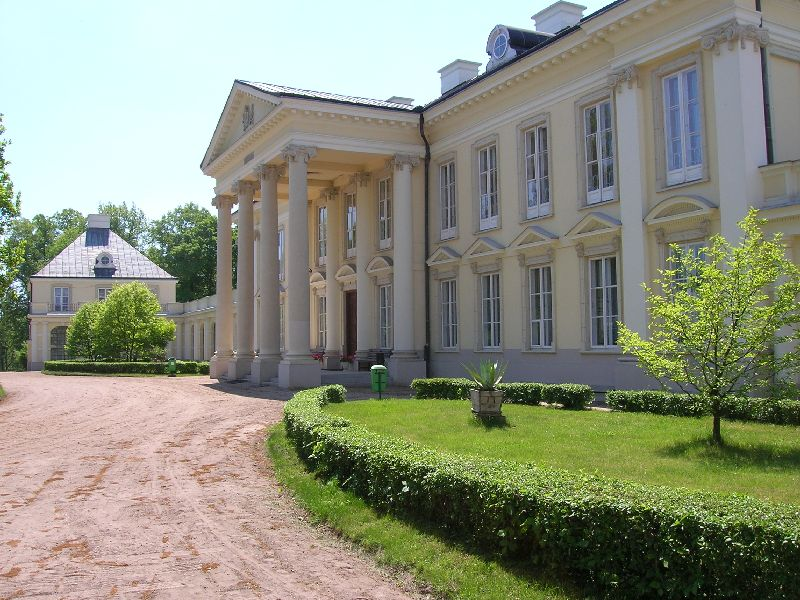
Residence in Walewice

== Walewska and Napoleon ==
Maria Walewska met Napoleon for the first time in 1806 in Błonie, or in Jabłonna. (Note: The exact location provokes disputes among historians. Frederic Masson published extracts from Walewska's personal diaries in which she writes to have met Bonaparte in Błonie. However, Marian Brandys suggested that it is more likely that the encounter in fact took place in Jabłonna, as Napoleon's arrival to Błonie was not anticipated, and Walewska insisted in her memoir that she set out from Walewice expecting to meet the French emperor.) According to Maria's own memoirs, she spoke briefly with the French emperor in an inn when his carriage was changing horses, but the meeting was inconclusive. However, Napoleon remembered her for her extraordinary conversation and requested to see her in Warsaw, intending to have regular meetings with her. The political context for Poland was complicated; the country had been wiped off the map at the end of the previous century and Polish nationalists were hoping Napoleon might bring the country back to life.

They met again at a ball hosted by count Stanislaw Potocki in his Warsaw residence. Walewska was being advised to work towards a position in the inner circle of Napoleon by the Emperor's aide, General Géraud Duroc (Grand Marshal of the Palace). A number of Polish aristocrats asked her the same, hoping that she could influence the emperor to support Poland in its struggle to regain independence from Prussia, the Habsburg Empire and the Russian Empire. In her memoirs, Walewska maintained that she forced herself to get intimately involved with Napoleon for purely patriotic reasons:

The sacrifice was complete. It was all about harvesting fruit now, achieving this one single equivalence [convincing Napoleon to support the Polish independence movement], which could excuse my debased position. This was the thought that possessed me. Ruling over my will it did not allow me to fall under the weight of my bad consciousness and sadness.

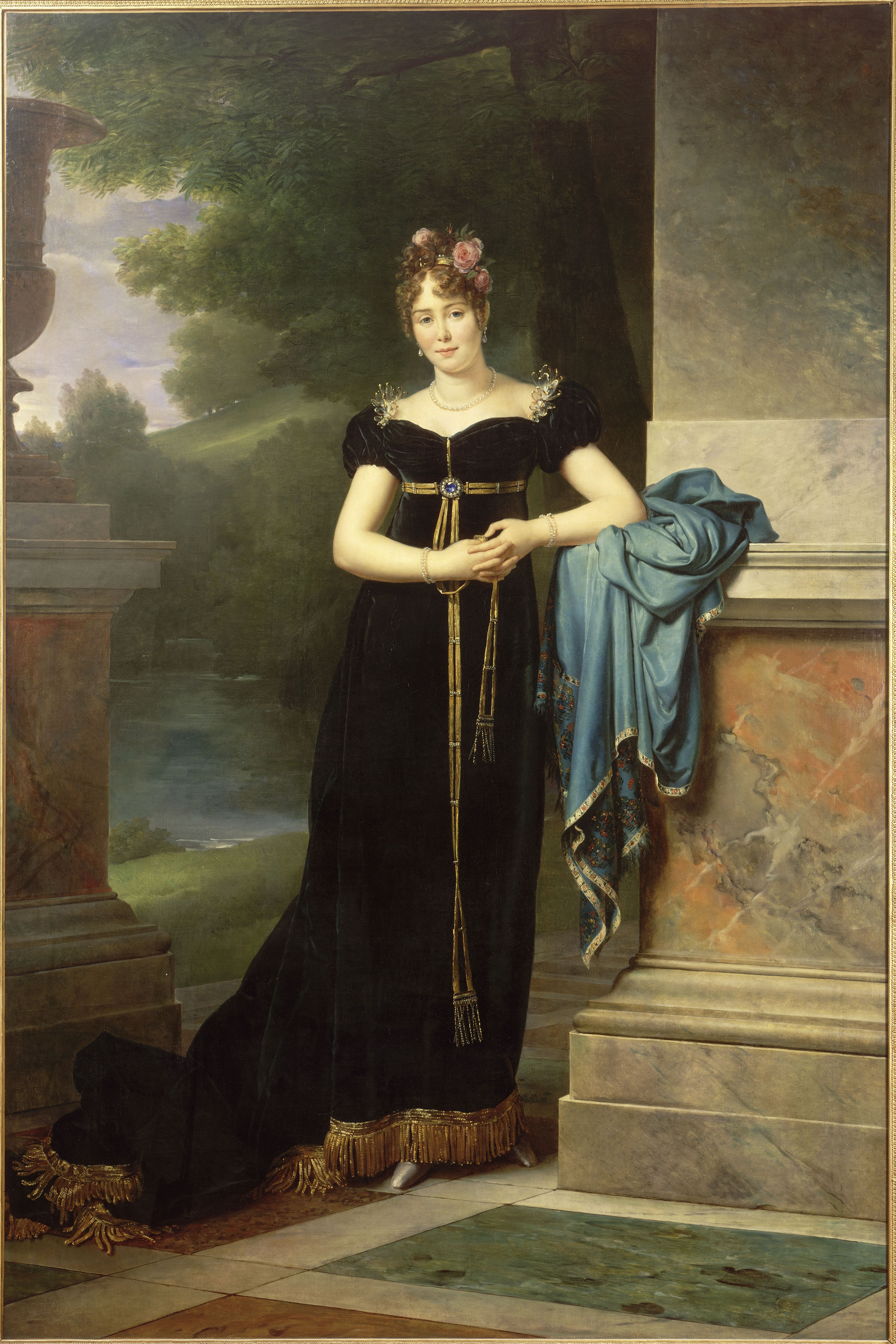
Portrait of Marie Walewska by François Gérard 1810

The intimate relationship was initially kept secret, even though unofficially it was one of the most widely commented on pieces of news in Warsaw's higher circles. Walewska visited Napoleon, residing in the capital's Royal Castle, only at nights and would secretly leave the building each morning. The relationship progressed when Napoleon moved to his field headquarters in Finckenstein Palace in East Prussia (now Kamieniec Suski, Poland): Walewska followed him there and they moved into neighbouring apartments. As Maria was extraordinarily discreet for her times, they still maintained apparent secrecy: she refused to leave the part of the building in which they lived, fearing being seen by officers surrounding Napoleon, many of whom were her acquaintances or relatives.

According to Madame de Rémusat:

This extraordinary wooing did not, however, prevent the young Polish lady [Marie] from becoming attached to the Emperor, for their liaison was prolonged during several campaigns.

In 1809 Walewska followed Napoleon during his journey to Vienna, where she lived in a house near Schönbrunn Palace, Napoleon's residence. During her sojourn in Vienna she became pregnant and returned to Walewice in order to give birth to her second son, Alexandre Joseph. Although Alexandre was rumoured to be the natural son of the Emperor, Count Athanasius officially recognised Alexandre as his son and gave him the name of the counts of Colonna-Walewski.

In 1810 Napoleon returned to Paris, where he was soon joined by Walewska. She settled in a palatial residence in the Rue de Montmorency and was given a large rent of 120,000 francs and a permission to enter all of the imperial museums, but her relationship with Napoleon ended. The Emperor planned to divorce Joséphine and instead arrange a strategic marriage to Marie Louise, daughter of the Austrian Emperor. Maintaining his relationship with Walewska seemed inappropriate to gain that goal. Though Marie Walewska was since presented at the Imperial Court, initially provoking the jealousy of Joséphine, after the divorce she became an intimate friend of the former Empress at Malmaison, frequently bringing her son. Walewska's future and that of her son were nevertheless assured by the grant of large land estates in the Kingdom of Naples. On 15 June 1812, at Königsberg, East Prussia, Napoleon signed the letters patent, officially recognizing Alexandre with the title of Count of the Empire.

Following Napoleon's first abdication, Walewska traveled to Fontainebleau, where the Emperor had unsuccessfully attempted to end his life. She waited throughout the night in an anteroom for his summons. However, Napoleon recalled her presence only in the morning, by which time she had departed. He remarked, "Poor woman, she will think she was forgotten!" Though he took the time to send her a reassuring note.

During his exile to Elba, on 1 September 1814, Walewska visited the Emperor, bringing their son Alexandre. Napoleon received them discreetly, meeting her and escorting her to the Sanctuary of the Sanctuary of the Madonna del Monte, a secluded convent above Marciana. He had set up a tent in the garden to host his guests. The visit was cut short due to rumors on the island mistaking her for the Empress and their son for the King of Rome. To prevent scandal, she departed to the mainland.

After the Hundred Days, Walewska and her son visited Napoleon once more at Malmaison for a tearful farewell before his departure to Saint Helena. Joséphine's daughter, Hortense, invited her to stay for lunch to prevent people to observe her in such a state.

== Later years ==
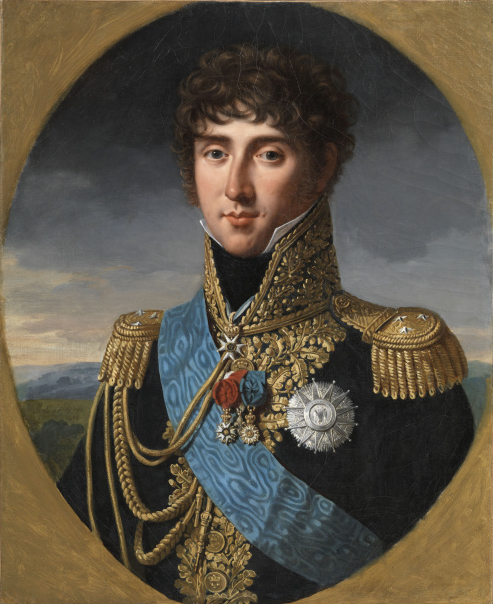
Count d'Ornano

In 1812 Maria divorced Count Athanasius Walewski. To facilitate it, her brother, Benedykt Jozef, admitted to forcing the marriage upon her. It remains unclear whether this was the truth, as in her memoirs Maria stated that her mother influenced her choice to marry Athanasius. As a settlement, she and her oldest son received half of Count Walewski's estates; which, even though heavily indebted, represented considerable wealth.

In 1816 Maria married her longtime admirer and lover, Count Philippe Antoine d'Ornano. They settled in Liège as d'Ornano did not want to return to Paris due to his pro-Napoleonic allegiances. In 1817 Maria gave birth to d'Ornano's son, Rudolph Augustus. She died in Paris shortly afterwards due to a prolonged kidney illness. Before her death, she completed her memoirs, which were addressed to her husband. Upon request from her Polish relatives her body was exhumed from Père Lachaise Cemetery in Paris and moved to her family crypt in Kiernozia.

== Descendants ==
Maria Walewska left three sons:

- Her son from the first marriage, count Antoni Colonna-Walewski, settled in Poland and little is known about his life.
- Count Alexandre Joseph Colonna-Walewski (4 May 1810 – 27 October 1868), her son from her relationship with Napoleon I who became an important figure in 19th century French politics: he was an influential diplomat and a cabinet minister. He maintained his whole life that his father was Count Colonna-Walewski.
- Her third son, Rodolphe-Auguste d'Ornano, was also an influential figure in the French society; his descendants created the well-known fragrance and cosmetics brand Sisley.

Marie Walewska also had a niece, named Barth, who lived in Bergen, Norway. The Walewska family thus has descendants in Norway living today.

== Legacy ==
Walewska's eventful life attracted attention of a number of Polish and French historians. As her memoirs remained unpublished until the late 19th century, she was a subject of much speculation. The first scholar to write a complete account of her life was a French biographer Frederic Masson, who was allowed by d'Ornano family to use her memoirs.

In the 1930s her adventures were once again described by her descendant, Antoine Philippe Rodolphe, 4th count d'Ornano in a book entitled Marie Walewska, "l'épouse polonaise de Napolėon". It was a belletristic biography that until the mid-20th century was considered as a key source on Walewska, as Antoine d'Ornano claimed that it was based on never published documents remaining in the archives of La Branchoire, the family castle.

Count d'Ornano's account presented Maria as a devout patriot and an influential political figure. His book claimed that she was involved in taking major political decisions related to the development of Duchy of Warsaw and engaged herself in disputes with figures such as Józef Poniatowski or Joachim Lelewel. These allegations spurred controversy among Polish historians, who noticed that both the described events and the dates quoted by d'Ornano seemed unlikely.

Biographer Marian Brandys attempted to deal with some of these doubts in his book The troubles with Lady Walewska and he went as far as questioning the very existence of documents from La Branchoire. His main argument was that the facts presented in the book were unrealistic in light of broader historical knowledge about Napoleonic campaigns and the politics of the Duchy of Warsaw. He also noted the numerous discrepancies between the French and English editions of the book.

== Lawsuit ==
D'Ornano's book had an equally profound effect on the historian circles in France. In the 1950s Jean Savant, a renowned historian and writer, wrote a book about Walewska in which he attempted to recreate a scientific biography of Maria Walewska. Before publishing the book, he printed certain extracts from it in Elle, a popular woman's magazine, which resulted in a lawsuit from count d'Ornano and his descendants.

The dispute revolved around copyright issues: Savant allowed the publication of extracts from his work, which included alleged excerpts from Maria's own accounts, taken from d'Ornano's book. However, he failed to appropriately reference them. Antoine d'Ornano sued him for illegally appropriating contents taken from Marie Walewska, "l'épouse polonaise de Napolėon", and when Antoine died, his descendants claimed that the aforementioned extracts were not historical source materials, as Savant claimed, but merely an invention of the author. The legal battle continued for a few years, and it was put to an end by Cour de Cassation which decided that Savant acted legally.

The d'Ornano family never allowed any historian to come into contact with the alleged Walewska archives. During the lawsuit they maintained that, in fact, the documents never existed. However, Savant in his next book L'Affaire Walewska attempted to prove the contrary.

== Marie Walewska in film ==
Walewska was the subject of the 1914 Polish film Countess Walewska, directed by Aleksander Hertz.

Her story is also told in a 1937 film Conquest, also known as Marie Walewska. Greta Garbo plays Marie Walewska to Charles Boyer's Napoleon. Boyer and art director Cedric Gibbons were both nominated for Academy Awards for the film.

She was played by Joy Allen in a dream sequence in A Soldier's Farewell, an episode of the BBC comedy Dad's Army.

She was played by Alexandra Maria Lara in the 2002 Napoléon miniseries.

There is a Polish movie "Marysia i Napoleon" directed by Leonard Buczkowski. She was played by Beata Tyszkiewicz.
