= Kiernozia =

- Town
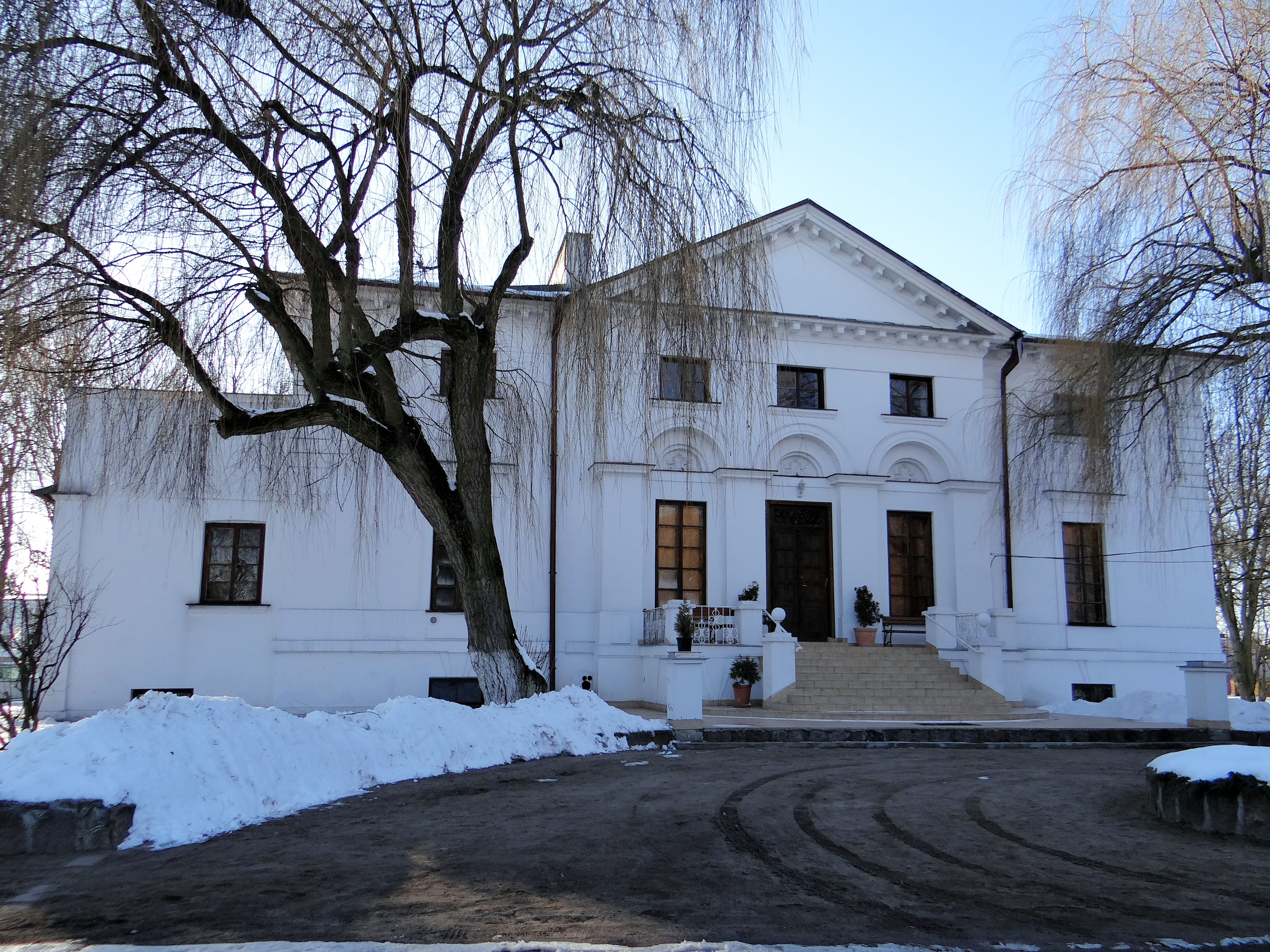
- Kiernozia Palace

- Flag Coat of arms

- Location within Poland
- Coordinates: 52°16′7″N 19°52′12″E
- Country: Poland
- Voivodeship: Łódź
- County: Łowicz
- Gmina: Kiernozia

Population
  - Total: 930
- Time zone: UTC+1 (CET)
  - Summer (DST): UTC+2 (CEST)
- Vehicle registration: ELC

Kiernozia [kʲɛrˈnɔʑa] is a town in Łowicz County, Łódź Voivodeship, in central Poland. It is the seat of the gmina (administrative district) called Gmina Kiernozia. It lies approximately 20 km (12 mi) north of Łowicz and 61 km (38 mi) north-east of the regional capital Łódź. It is located in the historic region of Mazovia.

== History ==
Kiernozia was a private town, administratively located in the Gąbin County in the Rawa Voivodeship in the Greater Poland Province of the Kingdom of Poland.

Following the German-Soviet invasion of Poland, which started World War II in September 1939, it was occupied by Germany until 1945. A local Polish policeman was murdered by the Russians in the Katyn massacre in 1940.

== Transport ==
Kiernozia lies along voivodeship road 584.

The nearest railway station is in Łowicz to the south.

== Notable people ==
It is the birthplace (and burial place) of Marie Walewska (née Łączyńska), a mistress of Napoleon Bonaparte.
