= De Contades =

Contades is a surname. Notable people with the surname include:

- Anne d'Ornano (née de Contades) (born 1936), French politician
- Erasmus-Gaspard de Contades (1758–1834), French politician and soldier
- Erasmus-Henri de Contades (1814–1858), French politician and diplomat
- François-Jules de Contades (1760–1811), French soldier
- Louis Gabriel de Contades (1759–1825), French soldier and politician
- Louis Georges Érasme de Contades (1704–1795), French general and Marshal of France
- Méry de Contades (1786–1869), French politician

== See also ==
- Marquis de Contades
