= Méry de Contades =

Méry de Contades, Marquis de Contades (8 September 1786 – 21 June 1869) was a French aristocrat and politician.

== Early life ==
Contades was born on 8eptember 1786 in Angers, the prefecture of the Maine-et-Loire department. His family occupied Château de Montgeoffroy. He was the second son of Marie-Françoise-Madeleine-Rose de Villiers de Riou (c. 1757–1833) and Erasmus-Gaspard de Contades, Marquis de Contades. His elder brother, Gaspard de Contades, married Marie-Henriette d'Oms, and his younger brother, Erasmus de Contades, served as aide de camp to General Jacques Lauriston. His sister, Françoise de Contades, married Count Armand-Charles d'Anthenaise.

His paternal grandparents were Julie Victoire Constantin de La Lorie, Dame du Plantis and Georges-Gaspard de Contades, Marquis de Contades, a member of the Académie des sciences. Among his extended family were uncles, Louis Gabriel de Contades, Marquis de Contades-Gizeux, and François-Jules de Contades, Viscount de Contades. His great-grandfather was Louis Georges Érasme de Contades, Marquis de Contades, a prominent battlefield commander during the Seven Years' War, who was made a Marshal of France. Through his brother Gaspard, he was an uncle to Erasmus-Henri de Contades, Marquis de Contades, a Member of Parliament for Cantal, who married Sophie de Castellane (daughter of Count Boniface de Castellane). His maternal grandfather was Jacques de Villiers d'Aubernière, Lord of Theil de Riou.

== Career ==
In 1809, Contades was appointed Auditor to the Council of State. He was entrusted with despatches for Emperor Napoleon I, then on campaign in the War of the Fifth Coalition, passing them to him in his tent, after the Battle of Wagram. For his work, he was given stewardship of Lower Illyria and Croatia, a substantial and difficult post considering his relative age and the unrest of the local population. In 1813, Contades had to evacuate Karlovac when its inhabitants took up arms. Later that year, when returning from Fusine to Fiume, Contades was attacked and, after having killed one of his attackers and having disarmed another, he was seriously wounded. Arrested and taken to Fusine, then to Agram, Contades was attended to by the family of Count Athem, who restored him to health. He was later released at the end of 1813.

As a reward for his services, he was appointed prefect of Puy-de-Dôme at Clermont, but was laid off by Restoration. Nevertheless, King Louis XVIII signed his marriage contract on 2 March 1817.

== Personal life ==
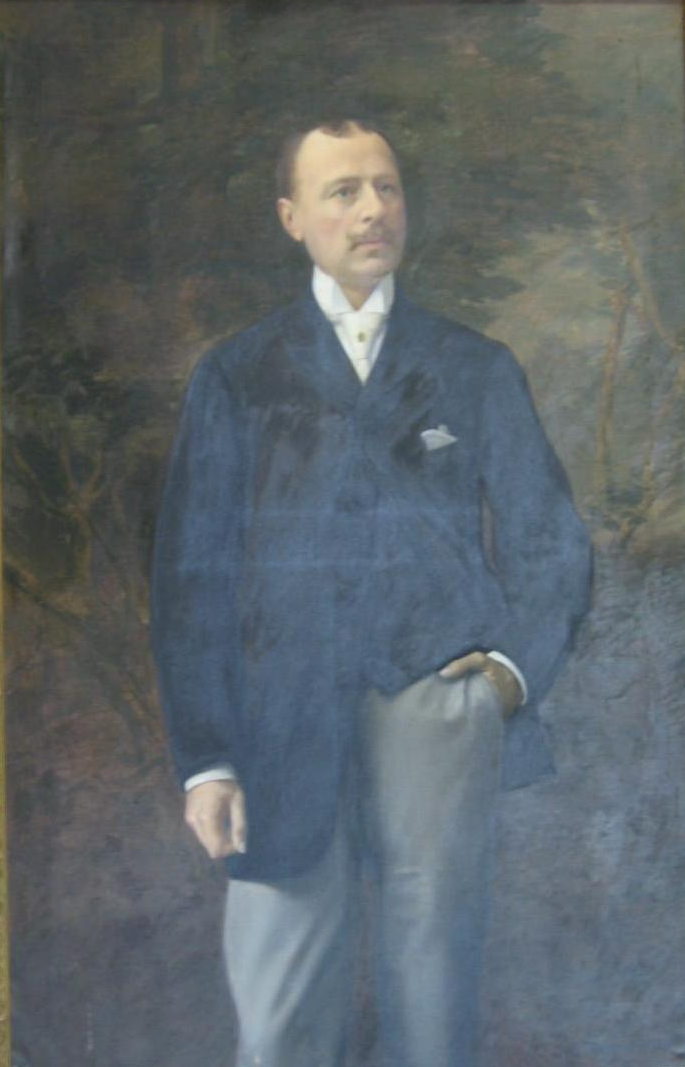
Portrait of his grandson, Comte Gérard de Contades

On 15 February 1817, Contades was married to Adèle du Fou (1795–1824) in Nantes. She was a daughter of the mayor of Nantes, Count François-Marie-Bonaventure du Fou, and Félicité Jogues (daughter of merchant Pierre Athanase Augustin Jogues de Guédreville). Before her death in 1824, they were the parents of three children:

- Léon de Contades (1818–1900), who married Emilie Desson de Saint-Aignan.
- Ernest de Contades (1822–1901), Mayor of Louresse; he married Marie de Charnières in 1859.
- Edmond de Contades (1824–1901), who married Marguerite de Broc in 1859.

Widowed after a few years of a happy union, Contades devoted himself entirely to the education of his three young children. Contades died on 21 June 1869 in Angers.

=== Descendants ===
Through his eldest son Léon, he was a grandfather of historian Gérard de Contades, Comte de Contades (1846–1899), who served as mayor of Saint-Maurice-du-Désert.
