= Guillaume d'Ornano =

French aristocrat and industrialist

Count Guillaume Marie Emmanuel Ludovic Rodolphe d'Ornano (25 June 1894 – 16 May 1985) was a French aristocrat and industrialist, who co-founded Lancôme in 1935, and was an owner-breeder of thoroughbred race horses.

== Early life ==
Count d'Ornano was born on 25 June 1894 in Tours, in the Indre-et-Loire department in France. He was a son of Count Alphonse Antoine d'Ornano and Marie (née Colonna d'Istria) d'Ornano. His brothers were Philippe Antoine d'Ornano (who married Marcelle Françoise Finet) and Jean-Baptiste d'Ornano (who married Andrette Rougier).

His maternal grandparents were François Colonna d'Istria and the former Marie Madeleine Pozzo di Borgo (a member of the noble Corsican family). His paternal grandparents were Rodolphe-Auguste d'Ornano and Aline Élisabeth de Voyer d'Argenson (a daughter of Charles Marc-René, 5th Marquis d'Argenson). Through his paternal grandfather, a diplomat who was appointed Chamberlain to Emperor Napoleon III, he was a direct descendant of Countess Marie Walewska and Count Philippe Antoine d'Ornano, an officer who was made Marshal of France (by his second cousin, Napoleon Bonaparte).

== Career ==
Count d'Ornano was attached to the Warsaw embassy after World War I. Upon returning to Paris, he became an advisor to François Coty (founder of the Coty perfume company, who is considered the founding father of the modern perfume industry). Following the death of Coty in 1934, d'Ornano and his business partner Armand Petijean founded Lancôme in 1935 as a fragrance house. The name "Lancôme", inspired by the forest of Lancosme that lies in the Indre valley in the heart of France in the region of Brenne, was chosen by Guillaume's wife Elisabeth. The company launched its first five fragrances in 1935 at the World's Fair in Brussels. They entered into the luxury skincare market in 1936, followed by make-up, cosmetics, and skincare products. In 1957, he sold his stake in Lancôme which was then acquired by L'Oreal in 1964.

After he sold his stake in Lancôme, he joined his sons Michel and Hubert at Jean d'Albret-Orlane, which they founded in 1954 with an investment from Guillaume. Jean d’Albret-Orlane was sold in 1969, after Michel entered French politics. Hubert continued to work for the company before acquiring Sisley in 1976, which the family continues to own today.

Count d'Ornano served as mayor of Moulins-sur-Céphons and general councillor for the Indre region for twenty-five years.

=== Horse racing and breeding ===
A prominent horse owner-breeder, Count d'Ornano owned Haras de Manneville, a stud farm near Deauville in the main horse breeding region in France. In 1962, his horse, Misti, captured the Prix Ganay at Longchamp, beating Sir Winston Churchill's Vienna by a half-length.

He declared his racing colours in 1934 (red and yellow-striped jersey, yellow sleeves, red cap). He served as chairman of the Société des Courses de Chateauroux and was a member of the Société d'Encouragement from 1964 until 1983, when he became an honorary member. From 1971 to 1978, he served as chairman of the Société des Courses du Pays d'Auge, which ran the Deauville-Clairefontaine Racecourse.

== Personal life ==
He married Elżbieta "Elisabeth" Michalska of Łodzia. She was the daughter of Józef Bolesław Michalski of Łodzia and Aleksandra Morchonowicz. Her sister, Aleksandra Michalska, married Count Peter Komorowski. They often traveled to New York, staying at The Pierre. Together, they were the parents of:

- Count Michel d'Ornano (1924–1991), who married Anne de Contades, a daughter of the Marquis de Contades, and the Marquise de la Rozière.
- Count Hubert d'Ornano (1926–2015), who married Countess Isabelle Potocki, a daughter of Count Józef Alfred Potocki and Princess Krystyna Maria Radziwiłł (a daughter of Prince Janusz Radziwiłł). He is the founder of the Sisley cosmetics company.

Count d'Ornano died in Paris on 16 May 1985.

=== Legacy and honours ===
In 1987, the Prix de la Côte Normande, a Group 2 flat horse race in France open to three-year-old thoroughbreds that is run at Deauville, was renamed Prix Guillaume d'Ornano in his honour.
