= Erasmus-Gaspard de Contades =

French aristocrat and politician

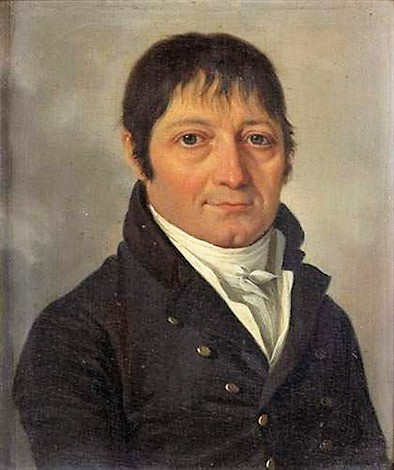
Portrait of the Comte de Contades, by Jean-François Sablet, c. 1805

Erasmus-Gaspard de Contades, comte de Contades et de l'Empire (12 March 1758 – 9 November 1834) was a French aristocrat, politician, and Lieutenant-General of the King's Armies.

== Early life ==
Contades was born on 12 March 1758 in Angers, the prefecture of the Maine-et-Loire department. He was the eldest son of Julie Victoire Constantin de La Lorie, Dame du Plantis (1739–1828) and Georges-Gaspard de Contades, Marquis de Contades (1726–1794), a member of the Académie des sciences. Among his siblings was brothers Louis Gabriel de Contades, Marquis de Contades-Gizeux (Baron of the Empire), and François-Jules de Contades, Viscount de Contades (known as the Chevalier de Contades).

His paternal grandfather was Marquis Louis Georges Érasme de Contades, a prominent battlefield commander during the Seven Years' War, who was made a Marshal of France the year Erasmus was born.

== Career ==
In 1773, at 14 years old, Contades joined the French Royal Army as a lieutenant in the Besançon artillery regiment. Two years later he was captain of cavalry and in 1779, assisted in the maneuvers of the Camp of Saint-Omer. In 1788, he was appointed colonel of the Royal Bourgogne Regiment and, in 1789, colonel of the Picardy Mounted Chasseurs Regiment (which in 1791 became the 9th Chasseurs) and emigrated to Koblenz, where he was named Monsieur's aide-de-camp in the Army of Condé.

=== French First Republic ===
After the French campaign, he reached Aix-le-Chapelle, then Düsseldorf, where he began to write his memoirs, before arriving in January 1795 in London, which had become the headquarters of the emigrants. A Major General in the Royal Army, along with Joseph-Geneviève de Puisaye, he participated in the preparation of the unsuccessful Quiberon landing (in an attempt to end the French Revolution and restore the French monarchy). Contades was one of the first to affirm that there had never been a written surrender by Lazare Hoche.

After spending some time on the Île d'Yeu, where he continued writing his memoirs, he returned to France. Following the death of his grandfather in 1795, and of his father (who was killed during the War in the Vendée in 1794), Contades became the head of the family. During the War, his wife and four children stayed in Anjou. His wife and her mother had been arrested in Angers, but were released in Blois and transferred to Paris following the Coup d'état of 9 Thermidor.

=== First French Empire ===
As soon as he returned to France, Contades set about restoring his fortune and returned to Château de Montgeoffroy, where he became general councilor of Beaufort-en-Anjou in 1804 before becoming president of the general council of Maine-et-Loire from 1805 to 1806. He rallied to the First French Empire and Contades commanded the Guard of Honour in 1808 which accompanied Napoleon I and Josephine when they crossed the department. On 1 April 1809, he was named Chamberlain to the Emperor, often staying in Paris, and was made a Count of the Empire on 28 May 1809, serving as a Peer of France from 1815 to 1830.

=== Bourbon Restoration ===
At the Restoration, he was made a member of Chamber of Peers and divided his time between the Luxembourg Palace and the Château de Montgeoffroy. In 1825, he was awarded the Commandeur of the Royal and Military Order of Saint Louis.

In 1885, his handwritten memoirs were posthumously published by his great-grandson, Count Gérard de Contades.

== Personal life ==
On 22 October 1781, Contades was married to Marie-Françoise-Madeleine-Rose de Villiers de Riou (c. 1757–1833), the only daughter of Jacques de Villiers d'Aubernière, Lord of Theil de Riou. Together, they lived at the Château de Montgeoffroy and were the parents of:

- Gaspard de Contades (1785–1817), who married Marie-Henriette d'Oms in 1813.
- Méry de Contades (1786–1869), who married Adèle du Fou in 1817.
- Françoise de Contades (1789–1847), who married Count Armand-Charles d'Anthenaise in 1809.
- Erasmus de Contades (1790–1813), aide de camp to General Jacques Lauriston, who died in Leipzig.

Contades died on 9 November 1834 in Angers.

=== Descendants ===
Through his eldest son Gaspard, he was a grandfather of Erasmus-Henri de Contades, Marquis de Contades (1814–1858), a Member of Parliament for Cantal, who married Sophie de Castellane (daughter of Count Boniface de Castellane).
