= Michalski =

Michalski (Polish pronunciation: [miˈxalskʲi]; feminine Michalska) is a Polish surname. Russian equivalent: Mikhalsky. It may refer to:

- Adam Michalski (born 1988), Polish volleyball player
- Aenne Michalsky (1908–1986), Austrian operatic soprano
- Anna Jagaciak-Michalska (born 1990), Polish athlete
- Arkadiusz Michalski (born 1990), Polish weightlifter
- Artur Michalski (born 1962), Polish diplomat and journalist
- Carl Michalski (1911–1998), German composer and conductor
- Clemens Michalski (1902–1977), American politician from Wisconsin
- Damian Michalski (born 1998), Polish footballer
- Daniel Michalski (born 2000), Polish tennis player
- Darren Michalski (born 1968), rugby league player
- Donald Michalski (born 1955), Canadian volleyball player
- Freddy Michalski (1946–2020), French translator
- Gerhard Michalski (1917–1946), German Luftwaffe pilot
- Grzegorz Michalski (born 1972), Polish economist, researcher
- Hans Michalsky (born 1949), German cyclist
- Jan Michalski (1953–2002) book publisher
- Jan Michalski Prize, Swiss literary prize
- Jen Michalski (born 1972), American writer
- Jerry Michalski, American technology consultant
- Jerzy Michalski, Polish economist and minister of finance pl
- Jerzy Michalski (1924–2007), Polish historian
- Jodie Michalska (born 1986), English footballer
- Johannes Michalski (1936–2019), American painter
- John "Mouse" Michalski (born 1948), American founder and guitarist of Count Five
- Julia Michalska (born 1985), Polish rower
- Kacper Michalski (born 2000), Polish football
- Konstanty Michalski (1879–1947), Polish Catholic theologian
- Krzysztof Michalski (1948–2013), Polish philosopher
- Łukasz Michalski (born 1988), Polish athlete
- Maciej Michalski (born 1981), Polish film director
- Madeleine Ouellette-Michalska (born 1930), Canadian writer
- Marcin Michalski (born 1958), Polish basketball player
- Marianna Michalska (1901–1959), Polish-American dancer and actress better known as Gilda Gray
- Mateusz Michalski (born 1987), Polish Paralympic athlete
- Mateusz Michalski (born 1988), Polish Paralympic swimmer
- Michael Michalsky (born 1967), German fashion designer
- Nicholas Michalski (born 2007), English footballer
- Piotr Michalski (born 1994), Polish speed skater
- Radosław Michalski (born 1969), Polish footballer
- Raymond Michalski (born 1933), American operatic bass-baritone
- René Picado Michalski (1905–1956), Costa Rican politician
- Ryszard S. Michalski (1937–2007), Polish-American computer scientist
- Seweryn Michalski (born 1994), Polish footballer
- Stanisław Michalski (1932–2011), Polish actor
- Teodoro Picado Michalski (1900–1960), Costa Rican president
- Tom Michalski (born 1951), Wisconsin politician
- Vera Michalski (born 1934), Swiss billionaire
- Wacław Michalski, Polish rower
- Wacław Waldemar Michalski (born 1938), Polish poet
- Zen Michalski, American football player
- Zdzisław Michalski (1928–1985), Polish rower
