= Marquis de Contades =

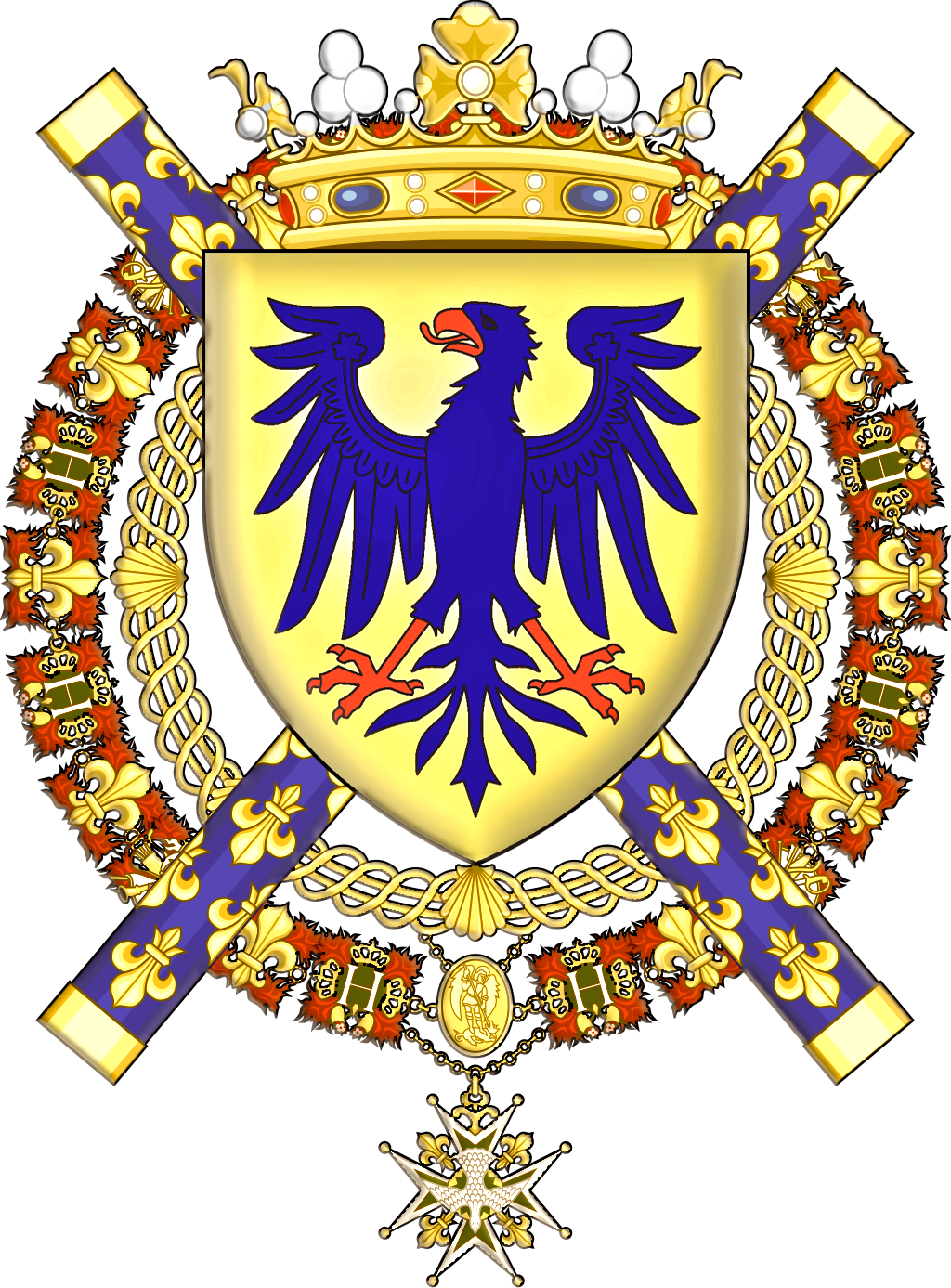
- Creation date: 1619
- Seats: Château de Montgeoffroy; Château de Gizeux

Marquis de Contades (French pronunciation: [maʁki də kɔ̃tad], lit. 'Marquess of Contades') was a title created for the Contades family, which had first been ennobled in 1619.

== History ==
The Contades family is a French noble family, originally from Béarn, which settled in Narbonne in the fifteenth century, before settling in the Duchy of Anjou around 1600. The family was first ennobled as Lord de La Roche-Thibault in 1619. The family was further elevated when General Louis Georges Érasme de Contades was made Marquis de Contades.

== Members of the Contades family ==
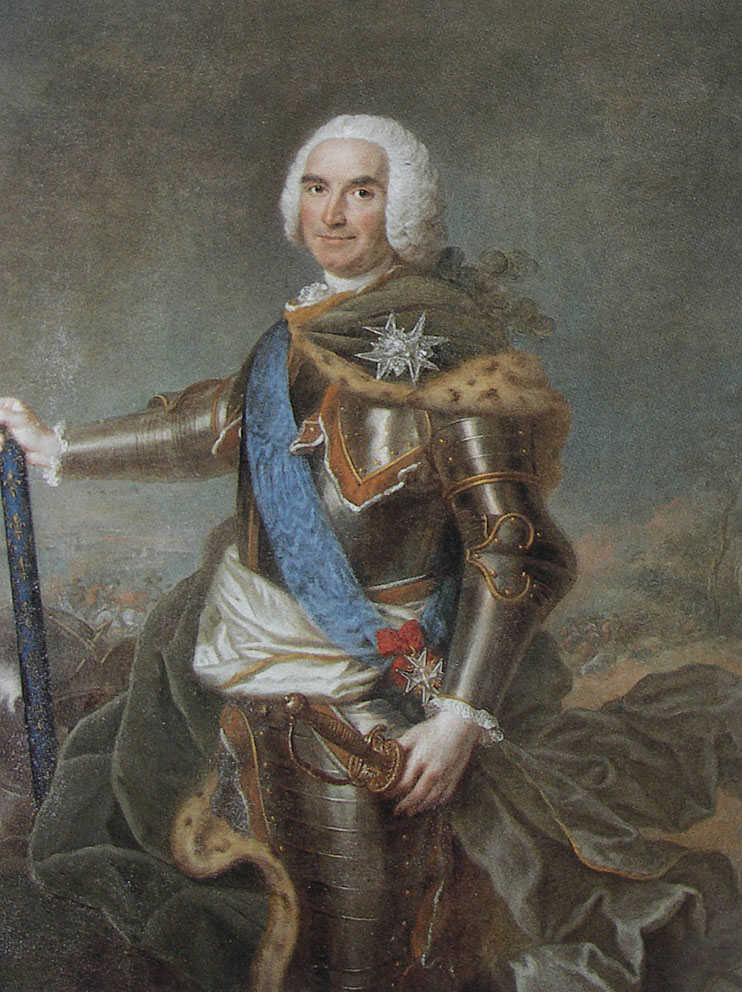
Louis Georges Érasme de Contades

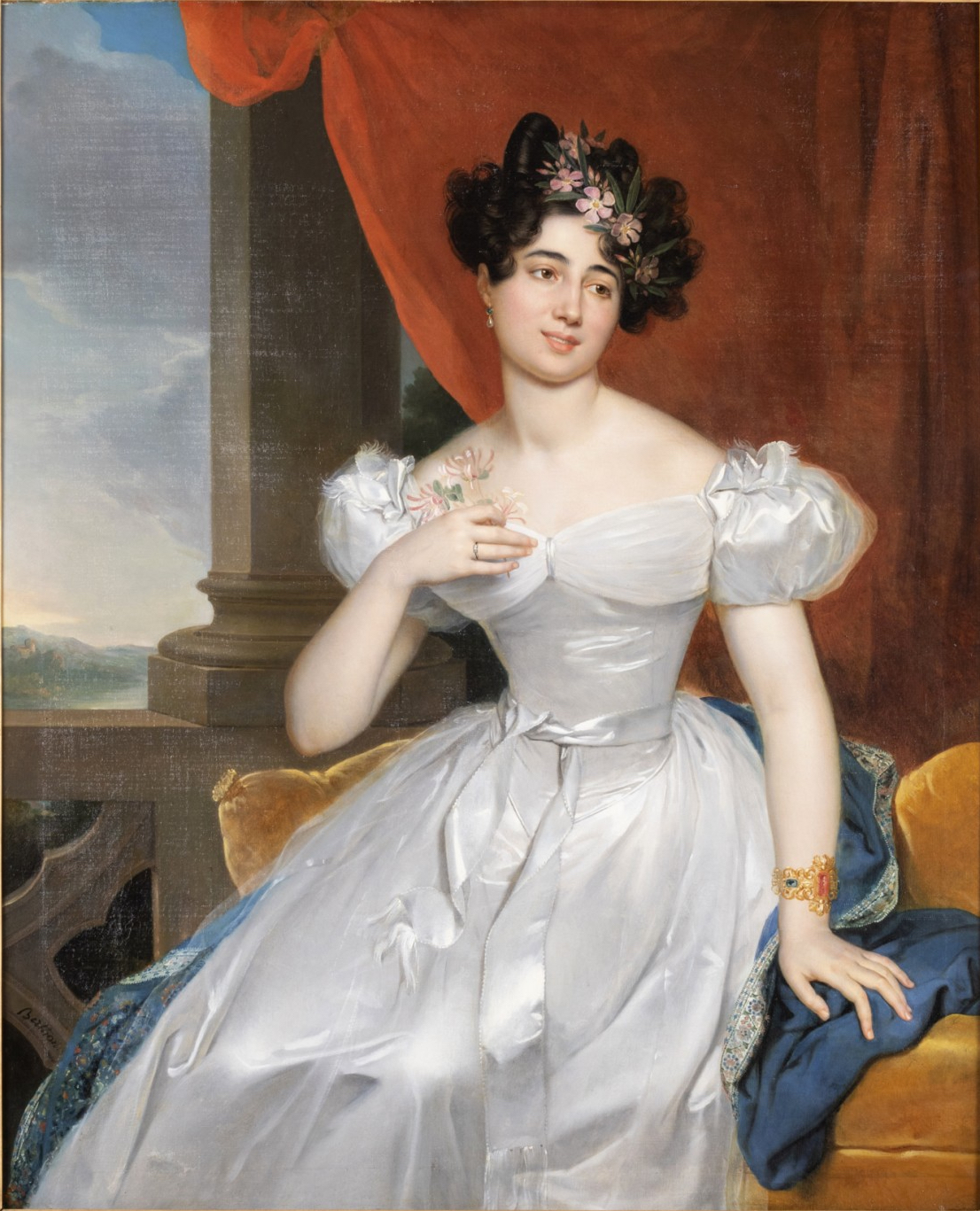
Portrait of Valentine de Contades (later Duchess of Chevreuse), by René Théodore Berthon

Excerpt of some family members:

- André de Contades (1572–c. 1633), Lord de La Roche-Thibault and officer of the King's Guards; married (1) Françoise de Conygham (maid of honor to Anne of Austria) and (2) Charlotte de Gandillaud de Fontfroide (lady-in-waiting to Anne of Austria)
  - Érasmus de Contades (1633–1712), Lord de La Roche-Thibault
    - Georges Gaspard de Contades (1666–1735), Lieutenant General of the King's Armies
      - Érasmus de Contades (1699–1734), killed at Siege of Philippsburg
      - Louis Georges Érasme de Contades, Marquis de Contades (1704–1795), Marshal of France
        - Georges-Gaspard de Contades, Marquis de Contades (1726–1794), a member of the Académie des Sciences
          - Erasmus-Gaspard de Contades, Marquis de Contades (1758–1834), president of the General Council of Indre-et-Loire, peer of France
            - Gaspard de Contades, Marquis de Contades (1785–1817)
              - Erasmus-Henri de Contades, Marquis de Contades (1814–1858), Member of Parliament for Cantal; who married Sophie de Castellane
            - Méry de Contades, Marquis de Contades (1786–1869), auditor at the Council of State, prefect at Clermont
              - Léon de Contades, Marquis de Contades (1818–1900)
              - Ernest de Contades, Marquis de Contades (1822–1901), mayor of Louresse
                - Louis de Contades, Marquis de Contades (1862–1949)
                  - Arnaud de Contades, Marquis de Contades (1907–1975), banker
                    - Arnold de Contades, Marquis de Contades (1933–2018)
                      - Arnaud Emmanuel, Marquis de Contades (b. 1969)
                    - Anne d'Ornano (née de Contades) (b. 1936), politician
            - Françoise de Contades (1789–1847), married Count Armand d'Anthenaise
            - Erasme de Contades (1790–1813), aide de campe to General Lauriston
          - Louis Gabriel de Contades, Marquis de Contades-Gizeux (1759–1825), Baron of the Empire
          - François-Jules de Contades, Viscount de Contades (1760–1811), known as the Chevalier de Contades.
            - Jules de Contades, Viscount de Contades (1794–1861), cavalry officer
              - Valentine de Contades (1824–1900), who married Honoré-Louis d'Albert de Luynes, Duke of Chevreuse
              - Gaspard de Contades, Count de Contades (1827–1882)
              - Gaston de Contades (1830–1872)
          - Victoire de Contades (1762–1841), who married Paul Marie Céleste d'Andigné, Count de Sainte-Gemme and Marquis d'Andigné

== See also ==
- List of French marquesses
