= Barbara Mróz-Gorgoń =

Polish marketing scholar

- Barbara Mróz-Gorgoń, 2026
- Born: 1982 (age 43–44)
- Occupation: Marketing scholar

Academic background
- Doctoral advisor: Aniela Styś

Barbara Mróz-Gorgoń and Donald Tusk, July 2026

Barbara Natalia Mróz-Gorgoń (born 1982) is a marketing scholar, professor at the Wrocław University of Economics.

== Biography ==
In 2006 she graduated in international relations from the Oskar Lange Wrocław Academy of Economics. There, after it was renamed Wrocław University of Economics, in 2011 she obtained doctorate upon dissertation Zarządzanie marką sieci franczyzowych w kontekście tworzenia jej wizerunku supervised by Aniela Styś. In 2020 she obtained habilitation at the Wrocław University of Economics. Since 2022 she has been Visiting Professor at Kasetsart University.

In 2025, pursuant to a regulation by the Ministry of Sport and Tourism, she was appointed as an expert to the inter-ministerial team developing a communication strategy for the brand Poland. In 2026 (it was announced in late July) she was appointed Government Plenipotentiary for the Promotion of the Brand Poland.

=== Report controversy ===
After the Ministry of Sport and Tourism released her report Polaków portret własny. Raport z badań DNA marki Polska she has been criticized due to mistakes and flops in the report that were a result of, among others, the implementation of AI-models in the process of preparation of the report.

The Regional Prosecutor's Office in Warsaw ordered a search of Barbara Mróz-Gorgoń's home in Lower Silesia. The prosecutor's office has launched an investigation into the possible fraudulent obtaining of 180,000 zlotys from the Ministry of Sport and Tourism.

== Books ==
- Rebranding. Strategiczna zmiana dla organizacji. PWN. 2019.
