= Philippe Augier =

French politician (born 1949)

- Augier in 2015

Mayor of Deauville
- Incumbent
- Assumed office 18 March 2001
- Preceded by: Anne d'Ornano

Personal details
- Born: 3 September 1949 (age 77) Paris, France
- Party: New Centre
- Spouse: Marielle de Sarnez
- Children: 2
- Education: Paris Nanterre University

Philippe Augier (born 3 September 1949) is a French politician. He is a member of the New Centre.

== Early life ==
Born in Paris and raised in Colombes (Hauts-de-Seine), he spent his holidays at the Houyvet family mansion in Le Molay-Littry in Calvados. Philippe Augier became an early supporter of Valéry Giscard d'Estaing in the aftermath of the events of May 1968. He became the leader of the Giscardian youth organization in 1971.

Influenced by a trip to the United States during the 1972 election, he led the Young Giscardians in the 1974 presidential campaign. Its candidate elected to the Elysée, he left the presidency of the Young Independent Republicans to Dominique Bussereau and the General Secretariat to Jean-Pierre Raffarin to become national secretary of the Independent Republicans, along with Michel d'Ornano and Michel Poniatowski, and ran against RPR deputy Daniel Goulet in the Orne in the 1981 election.

== Political career ==
Having abandoned politics in the 1970s and 1980s to join the French Agency for the sale of thoroughbreds, Philippe Augier became a member of the municipal council of Deauville in 1995 as a member of the UDF. He took the reins of the town in 2001, succeeding Anne d'Ornano with almost 70% of the vote.

Staunch supporter of the reunification of Normandy, he was the UDF's top candidate in the 2004 regional elections in Basse-Normandie. He won 9.26% and was reluctant to endorse the incumbent UMP President, René Garrec. Many in the UMP blamed him for the defeat of Garrec by Socialist candidate Philippe Duron.

Originally the UDF candidate in the Calvados' 4th constituency against incumbent deputy Nicole Ameline, he dropped out after the defeat of UDF candidate François Bayrou in the presidential election. Reelected Mayor of Deauville with 78.2% of votes in the first round, he became president of the Cœur Côte Fleurie Communauté de communes succeeding Paul Mentré.

Always close to Anne d'Ornano, Augier originally remained outside the right-wing parties, while cultivating friendships with the MoDem, New Centre and the UMP, and was entrusted by Nicolas Sarkozy the task of writing a report on national cultural and sporting events.

In July 2009, Augier was appointed to be the New Centre's top candidate in the 2010 regional elections in Lower Normandy. Originally, he was favoured to be endorsed by the UMP but was dropped in favour of Jean-François Le Grand.

In 2019, Augier publicly declared his support for incumbent President Emmanuel Macron.

== Personal life ==
Augier was married and then divorced Marielle de Sarnez, longtime MoDem delegate to the European Parliament and later elected to the French National Assembly. They have two children.
