= Michel d'Ornano =

French politician (1924–1991)

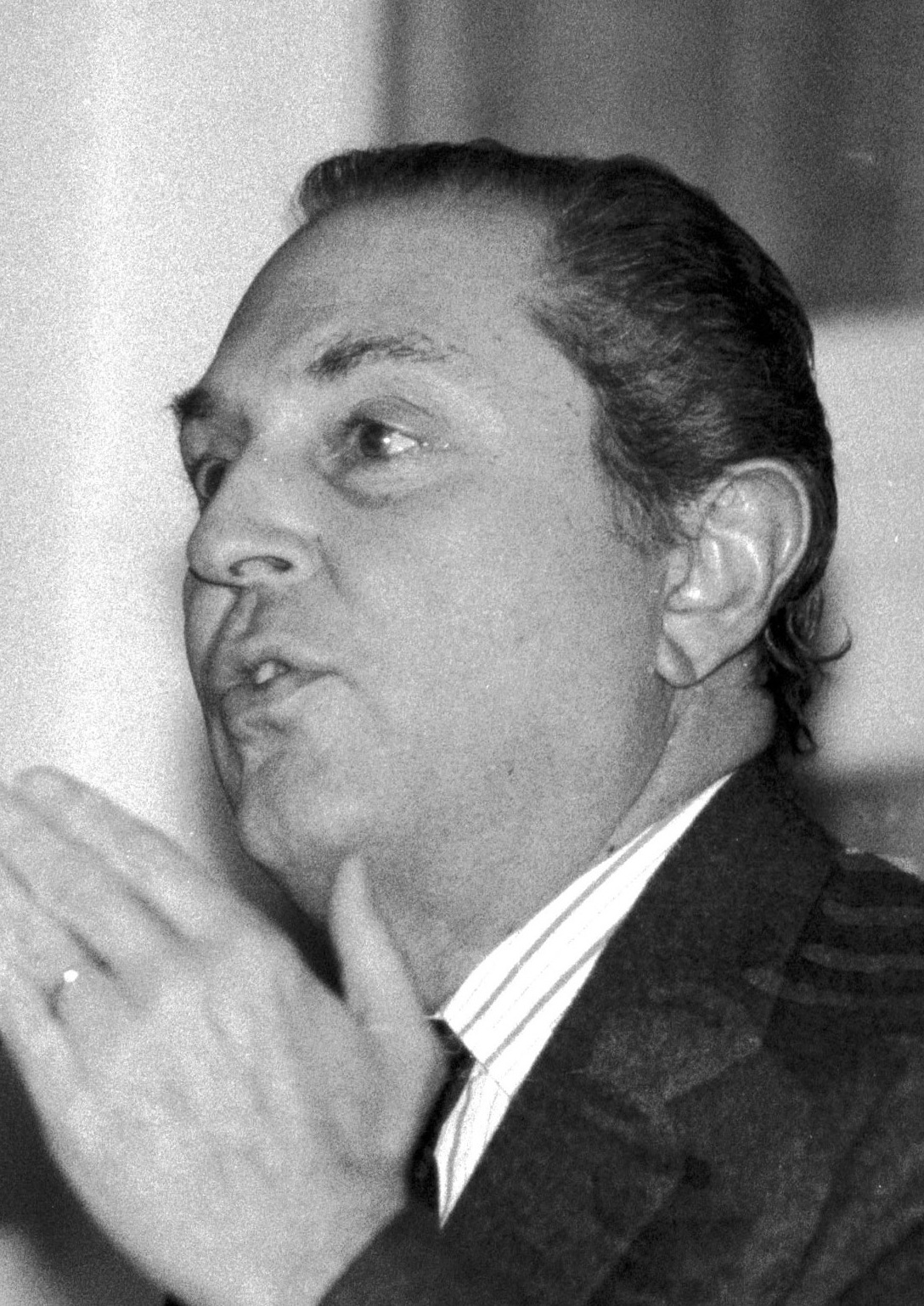

Minister of Culture
- In office 1977–1978
- President: Valéry Giscard d'Estaing
- Prime Minister: Raymond Barre
- Preceded by: Françoise Giroud
- Succeeded by: Jean-Philippe Lecat

President of the Regional council of Lower Normandy
- In office 1983–1986
- Preceded by: Léon Jozeau-Marigné
- Succeeded by: René Garrec

President of the General council of Calvados
- In office 1979–1991
- Preceded by: Robert Bisson
- Succeeded by: Anne d'Ornano

Mayor of Deauville
- In office 1962–1977
- Preceded by: Robert Fossorier
- Succeeded by: Anne d'Ornano

Personal details
- Born: 12 July 1924 Paris, France
- Died: 8 March 1991 (aged 66) Garches, France
- Party: UDF
- Spouse: Anne de Contades (m. 1960)
- Relations: Hubert d'Ornano (brother)
- Children: Catherine d'Ornano; Jean-Guillaume d'Ornano
- Education: Lycée Carnot

Michel d'Ornano (12 July 1924 – 8 March 1991) was a French politician.

== Early life ==
Count d'Ornano was born in Paris on 12 July 1924. He was a son of Count Guillaume d'Ornano, a co-founder of Lancôme in 1935 (which was acquired by L'Oreal in 1964). His younger brother was Count Hubert d'Ornano.

He was a descendant of both Marie Walewska and Philippe Antoine d'Ornano.

== Career ==
He was a founder of the perfume houses of Jean d'Albret and, with his brother Hubert, Orlane.

Count d'Ornano began his political career as mayor of Deauville in 1962. He served as president of the General Councils of both Calvados and Basse-Normandie before going on to represent the fourth district of Calvados in the Parliament of France; in that body he sat first as an Independent Republican and later with the Union for French Democracy. He served in numerous cabinet positions under Valéry Giscard d'Estaing, including as Secretary of State for Ecology, the Minister of Culture, and Minister of Industry.

== Personal life ==
In September 1960, D'Ornano was married to Anne de Contades, a daughter of the Marquis de Contades of the Château de Montgeoffroy in Anjou, France, and the Marquise de la Rozière of San Ángel, Mexico. Her maternal grandmother was the Hon. Mrs. Fanny Lawrence Vernon of Sudbury Hall, Derbyshire, England. She was later installed as mayor of Deauville. They were the parents of Catherine d'Ornano and Jean-Guillaume d'Ornano.

Count d'Ornano died on 8 March 1991 in Garches after he was struck by a car near his home in the Paris suburb of Saint-Cloud. After his death, in 1991, she became president of the Regional Council of Calvados.

== Legacy ==
The Stade Michel d'Ornano in Caen was named after him.
