= Józef Alfred Potocki =

Polish diplomat (1895–1968)

Count Józef Alfred Potocki
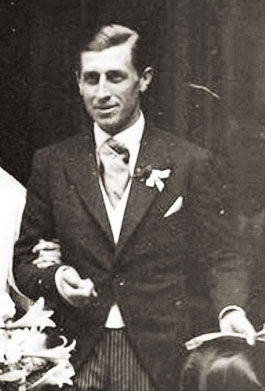
- Born: Józef Alfred Henryk Potocki; 8 April 1895; Szepetowka, Zaslavsky Uyezd, Volhynian Governorate, Russian Empire
- Died: 12 September 1968 (aged 73); Lausanne, Switzerland
- Noble family: Potocki
- Spouse: Princess Krystyna Maria Radziwiłł (m. 1930)
- Issue: Countess Anna Potocki; Countess Dorota Potocki; Countess Isabella Potocki; Count Peter Potocki
- Father: Count Józef Mikołaj Potocki
- Mother: Princess Helena Augusta Radziwiłł

Count Józef Alfred Henryk Potocki (8 April 1895 – 12 September 1968) was a Polish nobleman and diplomat who served as the Polish government-in-exile's Ambassador to Spain.

== Early life ==
Count Potocki was born on 8 April 1895 in Szepetowka, a city located on the Huska River in Zaslavsky Uyezd, one of the subdivisions of the Volhynian Governorate of the Russian Empire (today in Khmelnytskyi Oblast in western Ukraine). He was the second (and youngest) son of Count Józef Mikołaj Potocki (1862–1922) and Princess Helena Augusta Radziwiłł (1874–1958). His elder brother was Count Roman Potocki (who married Princess Anna Maria Światopełk-Czetwertynska).

His paternal grandparents were Count Alfred Józef Potocki, the Minister-President of Austria from 1870 to 1871, and Princess Maria Klementyna Sanguszko (heiress of the prominent Sanguszko princely family). His paternal uncle was Count Roman Potocki (who married his maternal aunt Princess Elżbieta Matylda Radziwiłł), and among their children were Count Jerzy Józef Potocki, was the Polish ambassador to the United States from 1936 to 1940. His maternal grandparents were General Prince Antoni Wilhelm Radziwiłł and Marie de Castellane (daughter of French aristocrats Henri de Castellane and Pauline de Talleyrand-Périgord).

He graduated from Balliol College, Oxford and a military school in Saint Petersburg.

== Career ==
In 1914, Potocki was active in the Sanitary Aid Committee in Warsaw and, from 1915 to 1917, he served as a soldier in the Russian Army, later of the Polish Corps in the East (under General Eugeniusz de Henning-Michaelis). From 1918 to 1919, he was an attaché to the Polish National Committee in London. From May 1919 to May 1922, Potocki was Secretary of the Polish embassy in London. From 1922 to 1929, he served as an official of the Western Department of the Political and Economic Department of the Ministry of Foreign Affairs in Warsaw. From 1929 to 1932, he served as an adviser to the Embassy in London. In February 1934, he became deputy director of the Political Department before becoming head of the Western Department succeeding Józef Lipski (who became the Polish Ambassador to Nazi Germany).

From 1939 to 1940, he served as the Minister Plenipotentiary in Paris and Angers. On November 2, 1943, he was nominated as a Minister in Spain to replace Marian Szumlakowski, however, he refused to transfer parliamentary functions and Potocki took up his position in Madrid only on June 1, 1944, as chargé d'affaires he continued to be a delegate of the Polish Red Cross to Portugal. The Government of Spain maintained diplomatic relations with the Government of the Republic of Poland in Exile after 1945. Potocki held the mission in Madrid until November 1955.

=== Awards ===
He was awarded the Order of the Revival of Poland, the Commander's Cross of the French Legion of Honour, the Portuguese Order of Christ, the Brazilian Order of the Southern Cross, 3rd class (1934), the Order of Orange-Nassau, the Decade of Independence Regained. He was twice awarded the Commander's Cross of the Order of Merit of the Republic of Poland and the Grand Cross of the Grand Cross of the Order of Polonia Restituta.

== Personal life ==
On 8 October 1930, Potocki married Princess Krystyna Maria Radziwiłł (1908-2003) in Warsaw. She was a daughter of Prince Janusz Radziwiłł, a Polish nobleman and politician, and Princess Anna Lubomirska. His wife's brother, Prince Stanisław Albrecht Radziwiłł, married Caroline Lee Bouvier (sister to First Lady Jacqueline Bouvier Kennedy Onassis). Together, they were the parents of four children:

- Countess Anna Potocki (1931–2000), who died in Paris.
- Countess Dorota Potocki (b. 1935), who married Luis Arias y Carralón in 1965. After his death in 1970, she married Carlos Mazzuchelli y López de Ceballos in 1987.
- Countess Isabella Potocki (b. 1937), who married Count Hubert d'Ornano, the owner of Sisley who was a son of Guillaume d'Ornano, a co-founder of Lancôme, in 1963.
- Count Peter Stanislav Jozef Potocki (b. 1940), who married Maria Teresa Roca de Togores de Bejar, daughter of the Duke of Béjar, in 1969.

Count Potocki died in Lausanne, Switzerland on 12 September 1968.

=== Family estates ===
In 1913, his father received permission from the Royal Court to establish two ordynats for his sons: Antoninskaya c. 25,000 ha (62,000 acres), for his elder brother Roman, and Koretskaya c. 24,000 ha (60,000 acres), for Józef. In August 1919, the family's a Neo-baroque palace at Antoniny (which had been built in the 1870s by Austrian architects Fellner & Helmer) was burned to the ground in a fire set by Bolsheviks. After the death of his father in 1922, Józef inherited the Korets ordynat. Under the terms of the March 1921 Peace of Riga (which ended the Polish–Soviet War), the Potocki brothers did not receive the ordynats promised to them.
