= Adam Lipiński =

Polish economist (born 1956)

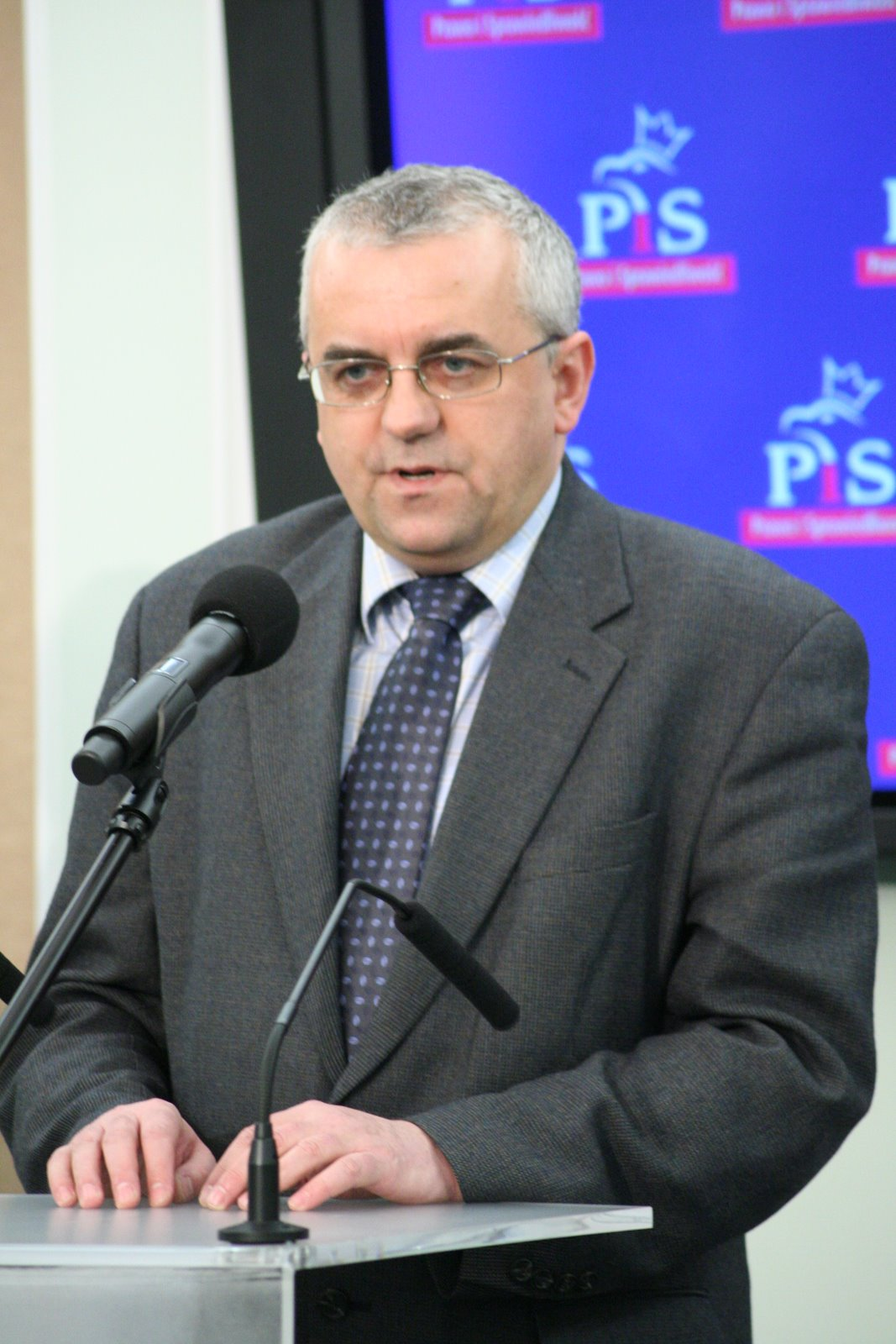

Minister for Relations with Parliament
- Assuming office November 2015
- President: Andrzej Duda
- Prime Minister: Mateusz Morawiecki
- Succeeding: ???

Member of the Sejm
- In office 27 October 1991 – 4 November 2020
- Constituency: 1 – Legnica

Personal details
- Born: 11 September 1956 (age 70) Głubczyce, Poland
- Party: Law and Justice
- Children: 1
- Education: Wrocław University of Economics
- Profession: Economist
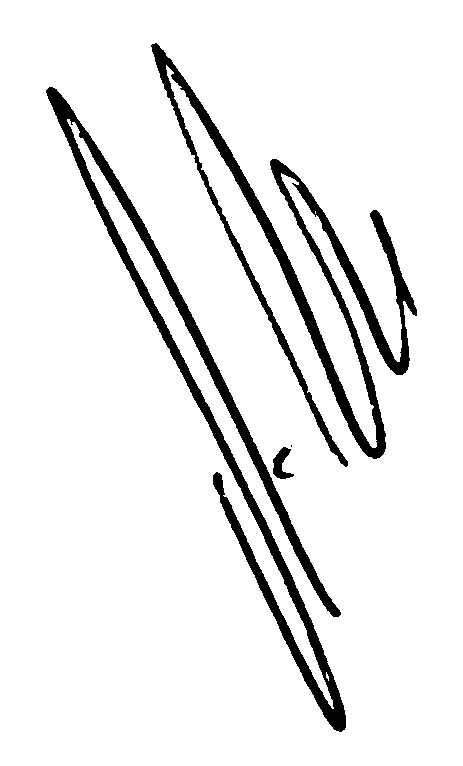
- Signature
- Website: adamlipinski.pl

Adam Józef Lipiński, is an economist, editor and lecturer, as well as a founder of the Law and Justice party in Lower Silesia.

== Life ==
He was born in 1956, and is a graduate from II Secondary School in Legnica and the Wrocław University of Economics.

He has worked at the “Hanka” Garment Factory in Legnica, and was a member of the Regional Board of the NSZZ "S" (Solidarity) in Wrocław and was an activist in the democratic opposition. In the 1970s, he was a member of the Student Committee of Solidarity, then the spokesman of the Committee for Social Self-defence in Legnica. In 1981 he was the head of the Publishing House of Solidarity in Wrocław. Until 1989 he had to remain undercover, acting in the conspiratorial underground during the martial law period. Among other things he was the head of the printing unit of the Regional Strike Committee (RKS) in Wrocław, he founded the organization Ruch Społeczny Solidarność (Social Movement of Solidarity), he was also the editor-in-chief of several books and magazines including Kret Publishing House and the monthlies Konkret, and Nowa Republika, which were distributed mainly in Lower Silesia (Wrocław, Legnica, Głogów, Jelenia Góra and in Warsaw).

He has been a political activist since Poland regained independence in 1989. In 1989, he was the president of Democratic Centre association, member of the Civic Committee in Wrocław, founder of Centre Alliance in Lower Silesia, and a deputy for this party to the Sejm of the Republic of Poland of the first term (1991–1993) as well as the editor-in-chief and then publisher of the nationwide socio-political weekly “Nowe Państwo”, which was published in Warsaw.

He was a founder of the Law and Justice (PiS) party in Lower Silesia and a deputy for the Sejm of the 4th and 5th term representing this party in the Legnica and Jelenia Góra constituency. On 4 November 2005, he was appointed Secretary of State at the Chancellery of the Prime Minister. From July 2006 to November 2007, he held the position of the Head of the Political Cabinet of Prime Minister Jarosław Kaczyński where he was responsible for the government’s cooperation with the parliament and for the policy to support democracy in post-communist countries and was the head of a dedicated team to deal with these issues. He was a coordinator for a number of election observations for elections in Ukraine during the so-called Orange Revolution (in total approximately 1,500 people). He was organizer of media projects aimed to support Belarus: Radio Racja and Belsat TV. He was co-author of the law Card of the Pole, which grants special rights to Poles who live abroad in the East. He was the president of the Polish-Moldovan Parliamentary Group. and initiator of projects providing assistance to the Cuban opposition.

In the parliamentary election on 25 October 2015 he was re-elected as a deputy for the Sejm of the Republic of Poland from the Law and Justice list in Legnica and Jelenia Góra constituency. He is currently the Vice-President of the Law and Justice party, member of the Political Committee of the party and the President of the Regional Council of Lower Silesia and CEO of the Regional Board of Law and Justice in Legnica. In November 2015, he was appointed Secretary of State at the Chancellery of the Prime Minister. He was re-elected in 2019. On 4 November 2020 he was nominated for a 6-year term as vice-president of the National Bank of Poland. Therefore, he ended his term as the deputy and Secretary of State. He resigned from his PiS membership, as well.

Lipiński is married and has one child. He has collected over 10,000 books.

== Honours ==
- Cross of Freedom and Solidarity (2016)
- Commander's Cross of the Hungarian Order of Merit (2016)
