= François-Jules de Contades =

French aristocrat and soldier

François-Jules-Gaspard de Contades, Vicomte de Contades (29 December 1760 – 3 September 1811) was a French aristocrat and soldier who was known as the Chevalier de Contades.

== Early life ==
Contades was born on 29 December 1760 in Angers, the prefecture of the Maine-et-Loire department. He was the youngest son of Julie Victoire Constantin de La Lorie, Dame du Plantis (1739–1828) and Georges-Gaspard de Contades, Marquis de Contades (1726–1794), a member of the Académie des sciences. Among his siblings were Erasmus-Gaspard de Contades and Louis Gabriel de Contades.

His paternal grandfather was Louis Georges Érasme de Contades, Marquis de Contades, a prominent battlefield commander during the Seven Years' War who was made a Marshal of France.

== Career ==
He served as "Major en second" of the Infantry Régiment de Bourbonnais. In 1791, during the French Revolution, he joined the Armée des Émigrés, a counter-revolutionary armies raised outside France by and out of royalist émigrés, with the aim of overthrowing the French Revolution, reconquering France and restoring the monarchy. He served in the campaigns of the Army of the Prince of Condé.

In November 1794, he was a Major in the regiment of British Uhlan Regiment, of which his brother-in-law, Louis de Bouillé, was Colonel. In 1795, he became Colonel of a Light Infantry regiment known as Talpaches de Rohan, raised by Cardinal Louis-René de Rohan (but owned by his nephew, Charles Alain, Prince of Guéméné) He later fought in the Régiment de Rohan in the service of Austria, reaching the rank of Major-General.

=== First French Empire ===
In 1803, he benefited from the amnesty concerning former emigrants, following article 12 of the Sénatus-consulte of 1802. He resided at his family's Château de Montgeoffroy, which had been the property of the Contades family since 1772.

== Personal life ==
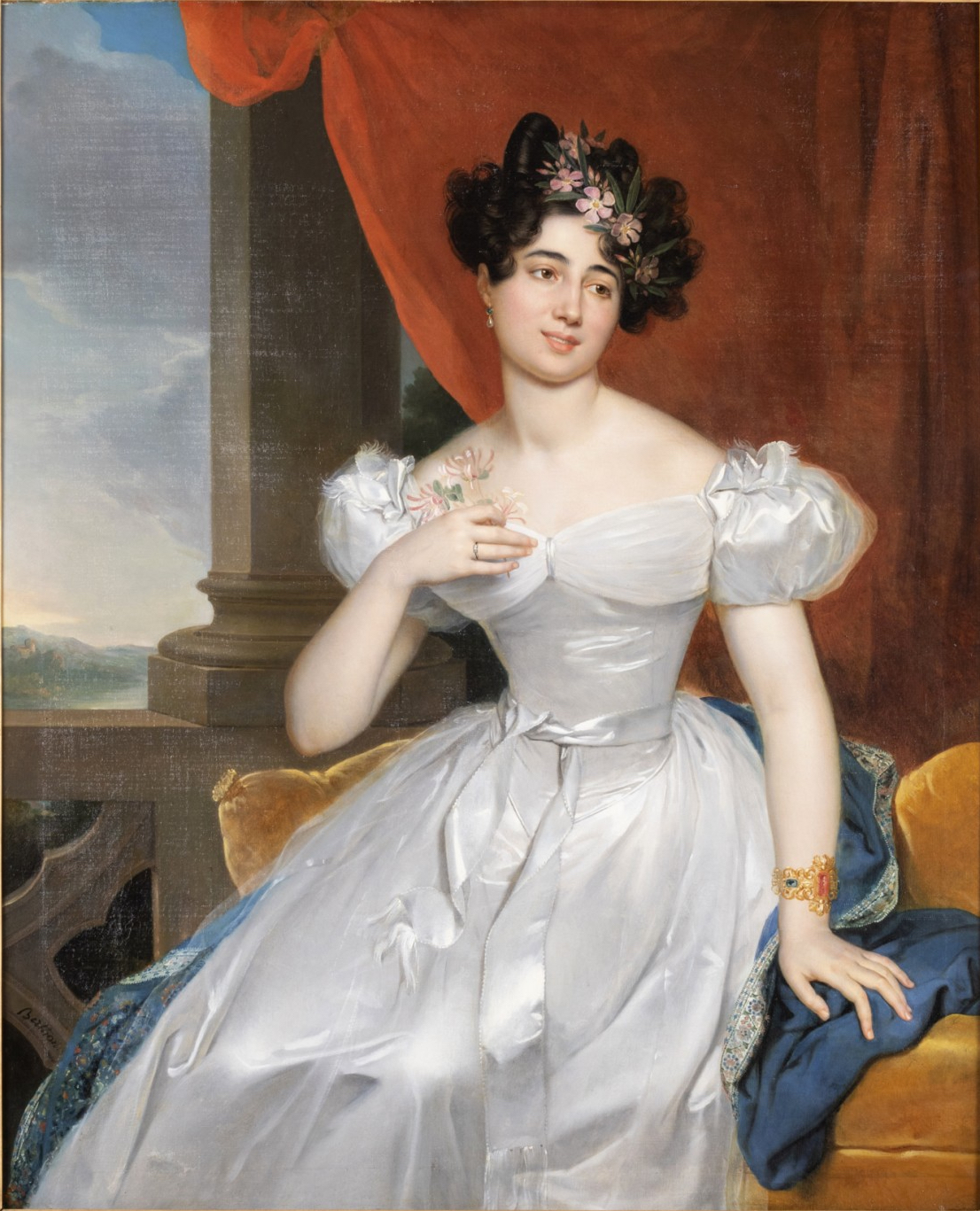
Portrait of his granddaughter, Valentine de Contades (wife of Honoré-Louis d'Albert de Luynes, Duke of Chevreuse), by René Théodore Berthon

On 9 March 1791, Contades was married, by contract, to Cécile Emilie Céleste Eléonore "Mérote" de Bouillé (1774–1801), a daughter of Marie Louise Guillemette de Bègue and François Claude Amour, marquis de Bouillé, one of King Louis XVI's generals who was a leading conspirator involved in the royal family's failed flight in 1791 (the failure of which forced Bouillé into exile). Together, they were the parents of:

- Constance de Contades (1792–1854), who married Jacques-Philippe Bernard de La Barre de Danne.
- Jules Gaspard Amour de Contades (1794–1861), a cavalry officer who married Gabrielle Adèle Alexandrine Amys du Ponceau.

Contades died on 3 September 1811 in Angers.
