= Erasmus-Henri de Contades =

Erasmus-Henri de Contades Marquis de Contades

Member of the Chamber of Deputies for Cantal
- In office 20 November 1847 – 24 February 1848

Personal details
- Born: 6 June 1814 Angers, Maine-et-Loire
- Died: 24 February 1858 (aged 43) Paris
- Spouse: Sophie de Castellane (after 1836)
- Parent(s): Marie-Henriette d'Oms; Gaspard de Contades

Erasmus-Henri de Contades, Marquis de Contades (6 June 1814 – 24 February 1858) was a French diplomat and politician.

== Early life ==
Contades was born on 6 June 1814 in Angers, the prefecture of the Maine-et-Loire department. He was a son of Marie-Henriette d'Oms (1790–1858), and Gaspard de Contades (1785–1817), a Senior Officer of Cuirassiers who died when he was only 31 years old.

Through his grandfather, Erasmus-Gaspard de Contades, he was a descendant of Louis Georges Érasme de Contades, Marquis de Contades and Marshal of France. His maternal grandparents were Count Dominique-Hippolyte d'Oms and Aglaé Françoise de Castellane (daughter of François-Henri de Castellane, Marquis de Castellane).

== Career ==
After serving as an embassy attaché, he was elected on 20 November 1847 to the Chamber of Deputies, the lower house of the French Parliament, for Cantal. The French Revolution of 1848, which led to the collapse of the July Monarchy and the foundation of the French Second Republic, ended his political career.

== Personal life ==
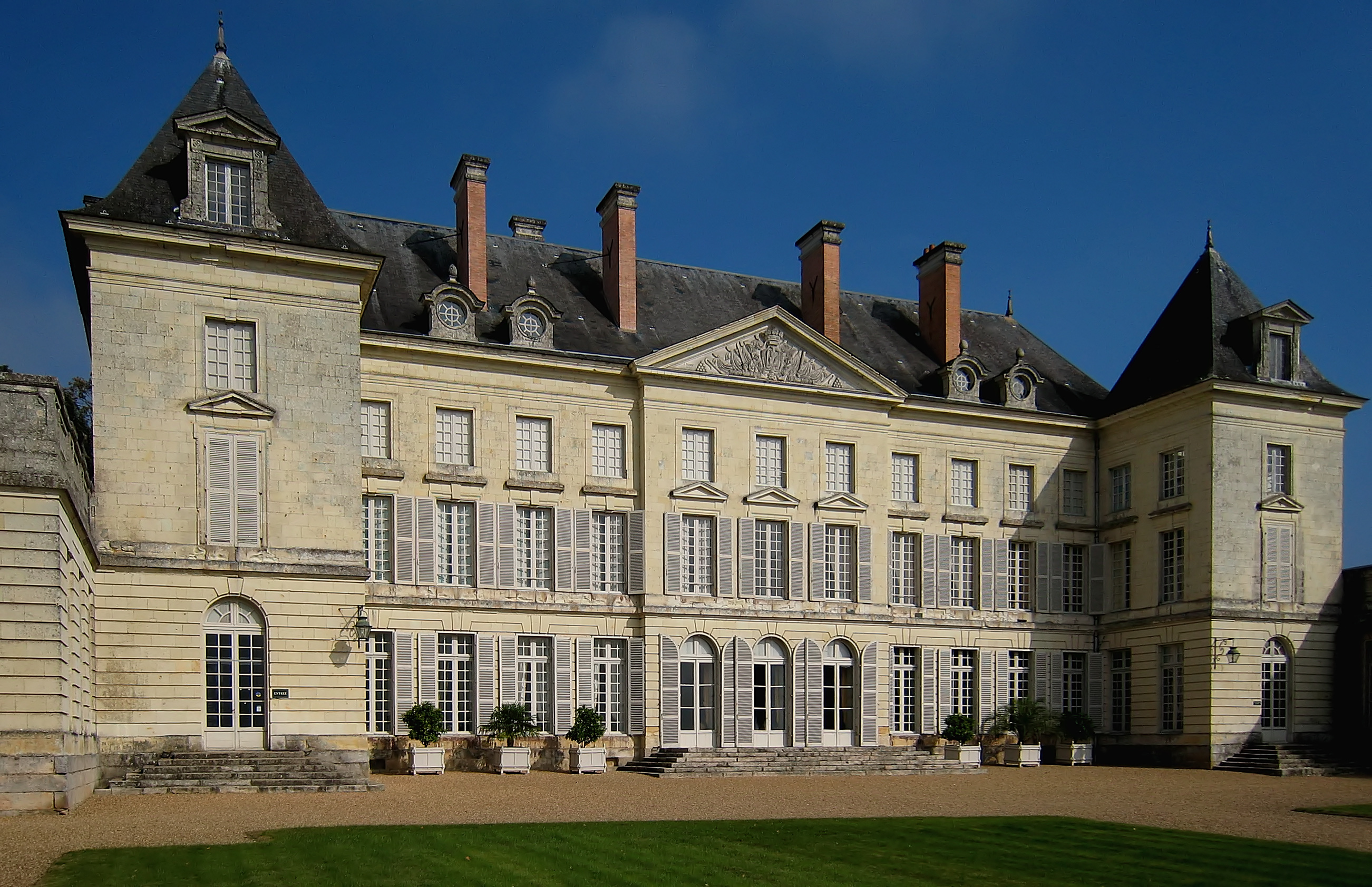
The family estate, Château de Montgeoffroy, 2007

On 27 June 1836, Contades married distant cousin Sophie de Castellane (1818–1904), a daughter of Count Boniface de Castellane and Louise Cordélia Greffulhe (younger sister of Jean-Henry-Louis Greffulhe). Her brother, Henri de Castellane, married Pauline de Talleyrand-Périgord and her sister, Pauline de Castellane, married Max von Hatzfeld and, after his death, Louis de Talleyrand-Périgord.

Contades died in Paris on 24 February 1858. After his death, his widow married Victor de Beaulaincourt, Comte de Beaulaincourt de Marles in 1859.
