= Louis Gabriel de Contades =

French aristocrat, soldier and politician

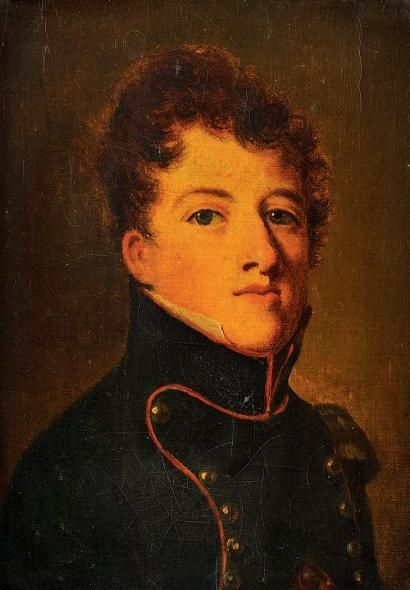
Portrait of the Marquis de Contades-Gizeux, by Louis-Léopold Boilly, c. 1790

Louis Gabriel de Contades, Marquis de Contades-Gizeux (11 October 1759 – 18 June 1825) was a French aristocrat, soldier, and politician.

== Early life ==
Contades was born on 11 October 1759 in Angers, the prefecture of the Maine-et-Loire department. He was the second son of Julie Victoire Constantin de La Lorie, Dame du Plantis (1739–1828) and Georges-Gaspard de Contades, Marquis de Contades (1726–1794), a member of the Académie des sciences. Among his siblings were Erasmus-Gaspard de Contades and François-Jules de Contades, Vicomte de Contades.

His paternal grandfather was Louis Georges Érasme de Contades, Marquis de Contades, a prominent battlefield commander during the Seven Years' War who was made a Marshal of France.

== Career ==
He began as a Midshipman in the French Navy before becoming Second Lieutenant in the Royal Corps of Artillery on 20 April 1776, before being made Captain of the Piémont in April 1778. In 1780, he was made a Lieutenant-Colonel, followed by Colonel in the Gendarmerie in January 1784. He was presented to the King at Versailles in 1787 under the title of Marquis de Gizeux. In March 1782, he was made second colonel of the Anjou-infantry regiment before becoming a colonel of the regiment in May 1791.

In 1791, during the French Revolution, he joined the Armée des Émigrés, a counter-revolutionary armies raised outside France by and out of royalist émigrés, with the aim of overthrowing the French Revolution, reconquering France and restoring the monarchy. He took part in the campaign of 1792. In 1794, he emigrated to Santo Domingo, where he commanded a legion of the Royal Army (supported by Great Britain). He was promoted to Maréchal de camp on 27 December 1795.

=== First French Empire ===
Contades became Chamberlain to Emperor Napoleon and was made Baron of the Empire in 1813. He served as Lieutenant-General of the King's Armies and mayor of Gizeux. He was general councilor of Indre-et-Loire before becoming president of the general council of Indre-et-Loire on 26 July 1815.

== Personal life ==
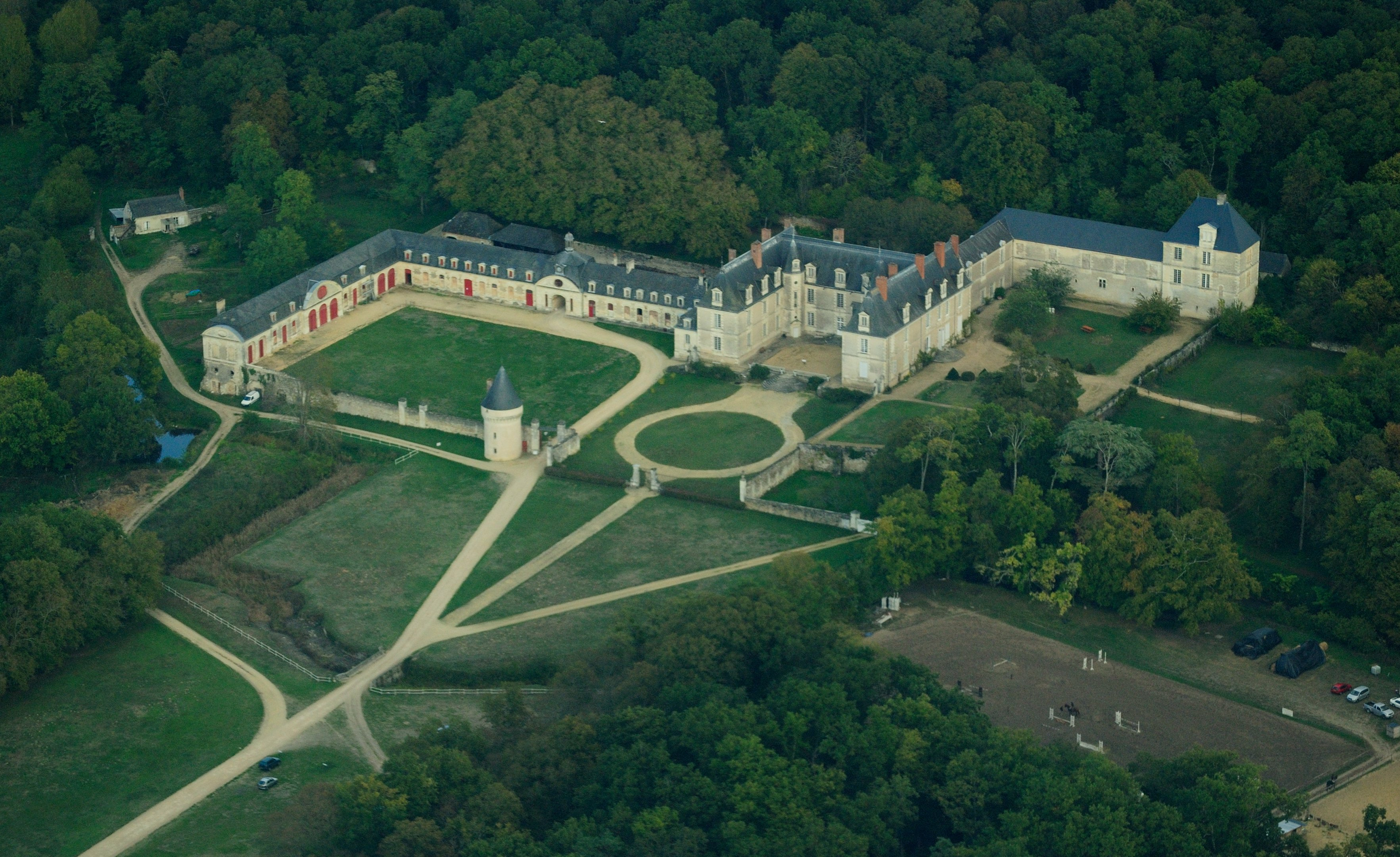
Contades' Château de Gizeux

On 17 October 1786, Contades married Périne-Julie Constantin de La Lorie (1767–1840). The Marquis owned the Château de Gizeux, in Gizeux in the Indre-et-Loire département, but had to flee in 1789, returning to Gizeux in 1801. Together, they were the parents of four children, three daughters and one son:

- Julie Louise Marie de Contades-Gizeux (1787–1860), who married René de la Rue du Can, Baron de Champchevrier of the Château de Champchevrier.
- Henriette de Contades-Gizeux (1789–1840), who married Alexandre Nicolas Bunault, Comte de Montbrun.
- Camille-Auguste de Contades-Gizeux (1791–1861), a Captain of Chasseurs who married Elisa du Fou in 1818.
- Aimé de Contades-Gizeux (1802–1802), who died in infancy.

Contades died in Gizeux on 18 June 1825, and was buried in the Cemetery of the Church of Gizeux. His widow died in Tours in 1840.
