= Hubert d'Ornano =

French industrialist (1926–2015)

Count Hubert d'Ornano (31 March 1926 – 25 September 2015) was a French industrialist who co-founded Sisley.

== Early life ==
Hubert was born on 31 March 1926 at the family castle in Mełgiew in Świdnik, Poland but moved to France at the age of eight. He was a son of Elisabeth d'Ornano and Count Guillaume d'Ornano, a co-founder of Lancôme in 1935 (which was acquired by L'Oreal in 1964). His elder brother was Count Michel d'Ornano, who served as Minister of Culture under Prime Minister Raymond Barre.

Through his paternal great-grandfather, Rodolphe-Auguste d'Ornano, he was a direct descendant of Countess Marie Walewska and Count Philippe Antoine d'Ornano, a Napoleonic officer who was made Marshal of France.

Hubert studied law at La Sorbonne university in Paris.

== Career ==
In 1954, Hubert and his elder brother, Michel, founded Jean d'Albret, a perfume company that produced scents such as Écusson, Rafale, and Lavande. In 1957, his father sold his stake in Lancôme and joined their business. The success of Jean d'Albret allowed Hubert and Michel to found Orlane in the early 1950s. Jean d’Albret-Orlane was sold the year after his brother entered French politics in 1968, while Hubert remained the company's chairman and chief executive officer running the Jean-Louis Scherrer subsidiary until 1975.

In 1976, Hubert acquired Sisley from its two founders and, with his wife Isabelle in a small two-room office, began developing the company into "the fastest-growing treatment line in Neiman Marcus, where, alongside Bergdorf Goodman, it was sold exclusively in the U.S." By 2014, Sisley reached 638 million euros in beauty sales. As of 2015, Forbes evaluated his net worth at $1.1 billion U.S. dollars.

=== Philanthropy ===
In 2007, Count d'Ornano and his wife created the Sisley-d'Ornano Foundation, under the aegis of the Fondation de France, to "deliver charity work and philanthropy across sectors in France and abroad." The Foundation assisted with the restoration of the fresco of the Church of Our Lady Assumption, the seat of the Polish Mission in Paris.

== Personal life ==
On 6 July 1963, d'Ornano married Countess Isabelle Potocki (b. 1937) at Deauville, France. She was a daughter of Count Józef Alfred Potocki and Princess Krystyna Maria Radziwiłł (a daughter of Prince Janusz Radziwiłł). Isabella's uncle was Prince Stanisław Albrecht Radziwiłł, who married Caroline Lee Bouvier (sister to First Lady of the United States Jacqueline Kennedy Onassis). Her sister, Countess Dorota Potocki, married skier Luis Arias Carralón. Together, they were the parents of:

- Count Philip d'Ornano (b. 1964), married designer Mina Pavićević in 1993; he became chairman of Sisley in 2013.
- Count Marc d'Ornano (1966–1986)
- Countess Élisabeth d'Ornano (b. 1968), the "face" of Sisley; she married Emilio Botin O'Shea, son of Emilio Botín (former chairman of Grupo Santander) and philanthropist Paloma O'Shea, 1st Marchioness of O'Shea, in 1989.
- Countess Maria Laetitia d'Ornano (1970–2013), studied human ecology.
- Countess Christine d'Ornano (b. 1973), married Lebanon-born financier Marzouk Al Bader in 2002.

Their Paris apartment was located on the tree-lined Quai d'Orsay in the 7th arrondissement of Paris, overlooking the Seine. Count d'Ornano died on 25 September 2015 and his funeral was held at Bouges-le-Château, in the Indre department of France.
