= Anne d'Ornano =

French politician (born 1936)

- Anne d'Ornano, Deauville, 1990

President of the General council of Calvados
- In office 1991–2011
- Preceded by: Michel d'Ornano
- Succeeded by: Jean-Léonce Dupont

Mayor of Deauville
- In office 1977–2001
- Preceded by: Michel d'Ornano
- Succeeded by: Philippe Augier

Personal details
- Born: Anne de Contades; 7 December 1936 (age 89) Paris, France
- Party: UDF
- Spouse: Michel d'Ornano (m. 1960; died 1991)
- Children: Catherine d'Ornano; Jean-Guillaume d'Ornano
- Parent(s): Arnaud de Contades; Sonia Raoul-Duval

Anne d'Ornano (née de Contades; born 7 December 1936) is a French politician.

== Early life ==
Contades was born on 7 December 1936 in Paris. She is the daughter of the Arnaud de Contades, Marquis de Contades (1907–1975), of the Château de Montgeoffroy in Anjou, France, and Sonia Raoul-Duval, the Marquise de la Rozière (1912–1997), of San Ángel, Mexico.

Her maternal grandparents were the Hon. Mrs. Fanny Lawrence Vernon of Sudbury Hall, Derbyshire, England (a daughter of the 7th Baron Vernon and American heiress Frances Venables-Vernon, Lady Vernon) and French polo player Maurice Raoul-Duval. She was later installed as mayor of Deauville.

== Career ==
She was the President of the General Council of the French department of Calvados. She has been President of the department since 1991. She was a member of the Union for French Democracy (UDF) until the UDF dissolved in 2007, and she did not join either of the UDF's claimed successors: the New Centre and the MoDem. Unlike most centrists, she supported Nicolas Sarkozy by the first round of the 2007 election, over UDF candidate François Bayrou. However, she is not a member of Sarkozy's Union for a Popular Movement (UMP).

Upon the death of her husband, she succeeded as President of the General Council. She also succeeded him as Mayor of Deauville in 1977, a post she held until 2001 when she retired in favour of Philippe Augier.

== Personal life ==
In September 1960, she married Count Michel d'Ornano, the eldest son of Count Guillaume d'Ornano. They were the parents of Catherine d'Ornano and Jean-Guillaume d'Ornano.

=== Honours ===
D'Ornano has been awarded the Legion of Honour, and is also a commandeur of the Ordre national du Mérite.
