= Grzegorz Michalski =

Polish academic (born 1972)

Grzegorz Marek Michalski
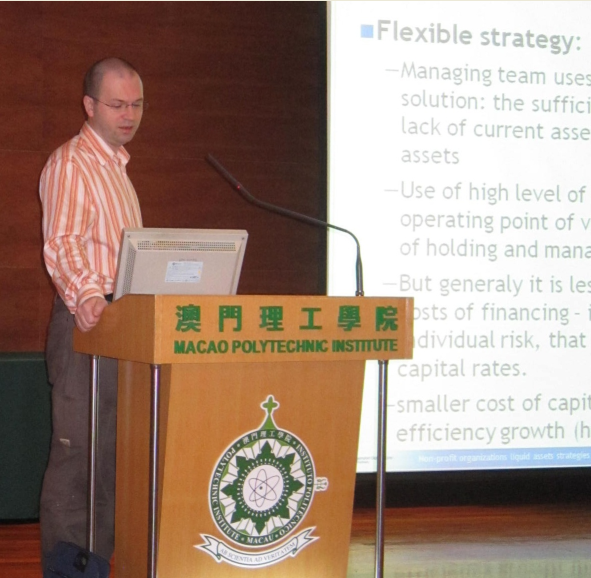
- Born: 13 August 1972 (age 52); Brzeg, Poland
- Education: MS (Finance), PhD (Finance), Habilitation (finance, banking and investment), BBS (Bachelor of Biblical Studies in Pastoral Ministry)
- Alma mater: Wrocław University of Economics
- Occupation(s): Professor of Wroclaw University of Economics and Business
- Years active: 1998–present
- Employer: Wrocław University of Economics
- Known for: Business Finance and Financial Liquidity Management research and texts, Bible translation
- Notable work: Value-Based Working Capital Management. Determining Liquid Asset Levels in Entrepreneurial Environments (Palgrave Macmillan New York 2014 ISBN 978-1-137-39799-7), Liquidity Management in SME (PWN 2013), Value-Based Inventory Management (2008)
- Awards: Medal for Long Service

Grzegorz Marek Michalski is an economist, researcher at the School of Management, Computer Science and Finance at Wrocław University of Economics. His main area of research are Business Finance and Financial Liquidity Management. Grzegorz Marek Michalski is a professor of finance. Much of his research is aimed at understanding the determinants and dynamics of financial corporate liquidity. In his research, he has examined the firm value and cost of capital results of corporate liquidity management policies and results of demand for liquidity by firms. He has also investigated the effects of corporate liquidity on portfolio choice and corporate current assets decisions. Currently, Grzegorz Marek Michalski is studying the liquidity decisions made by nonprofit organizations. Grzegorz Marek Michalski also studies current business investment in accounts payable, inventories and operating cash. Recent grants and projects examine the effect of liquidity constraints on nonprofit organizations and for-profit small enterprises decisions to level of current assets investments, and on whether or not to use such information on cost of capital level and results on business valuation results. In ongoing work, he studies the unique risk characteristics of business organization capital, and documents the high expected returns which enterprises heavily invested in organization capital earn. Grzegorz Marek Michalski work has been published in ISI academic journals such as the Romanian Journal of Economic Forecasting, the Journal of Economic Computation and Economic Cybernetics Studies and Research, and the Agricultural Economics - Zemědělská ekonomika.

Grzegorz M. Michalski is an author and coauthor of over 80 papers and 10 books. He is part of Editorial Boards in many international journals:

- Australasian Accounting Business & Finance Journal (AABFJ) ISSN 1834-2000

== Works ==
Grzegorz M. Michalski writes in three areas:

Value-based working capital management

- Michalski, Grzegorz M. (2014). Value-Based Working Capital Management. Determining Liquid Asset Levels in Entrepreneurial Environments. New York: Palgrave Macmillan. ISBN 978-1-137-39799-7.

Financial liquidity management

- Michalski, Grzegorz M. (2013). Financial Liquidity in Small and Medium Enterprises (Płynność finansowa w małych i średnich przedsiębiorstwach in Polish). Warsaw: Polish Scientific Publishers PWN. ISBN 978-83-01-17289-3.
- Michalski, Grzegorz M. (2004). Value of Liquidity in Current Financial Management (Wartość płynności w bieżącym zarządzaniu finansami in Polish). Warsaw: CeDeWu. ISBN 83-87885-53-3.
- Michalski, Grzegorz M. (2010). Strategic Liquidity Management (Strategiczne zarządzanie płynnością finansową in Polish). Warsaw: CeDeWu. ISBN 978-83-7556-167-8.
- Michalski, Grzegorz M. (2013). Short-Run Capital Management (Krótkoterminowe zarządzanie kapitałem in Polish) (with Wiesław Pluta). Warsaw: Verlag C. H. Beck. ISBN 978-83-255-5540-5.

Business finance

- Michalski, Grzegorz M. (2004). Encyclopaedia of Financial Management (Leksykon zarządzania finansami in Polish). Warsaw: Verlag C. H. Beck. ISBN 83-7387-276-0.
- Michalski, Grzegorz M. (2009). Business Financial Strategies (Strategie finansowe przedsiębiorstw in Polish). Gdansk: ODDK. ISBN 978-83-7426-567-6.
- Michalski, Grzegorz M. (2010). Introduction to Business Financial Management (Wprowadzenie do zarządzania finansami przedsiębiorstwa in Polish). Warsaw: Verlag C. H. Beck. ISBN 978-83-255-1509-6.
- Michalski, Grzegorz M. (2004). Fundamentals of Business Finance (Podstawy finansów przedsiębiorstw in Polish). Wroclaw: WSZ EDUKACJA. ISBN 83-87708-66-6.
- Michalski, Grzegorz M. (2007). Financial Performance of Microfirm (Tajniki finansowego sukcesu dla mikrofirm in Polish) (with Katarzyna Prędkiewicz). Warsaw: Verlag C. H. Beck. ISBN 978-83-7483-885-6.

Financial analysis

- Michalski, Grzegorz M. (2009). Financial Statement Analysis (Ocena kontrahenta na podstawie sprawozdań finansowych in Polish). Gdansk: ODDK. ISBN 978-83-7426-509-6.,
