= Château de Gizeux =

Edifice in Gizeux in the Indre-et-Loire département of France

Coordinates: 47°23′26.33″N 0°12′21.91″E

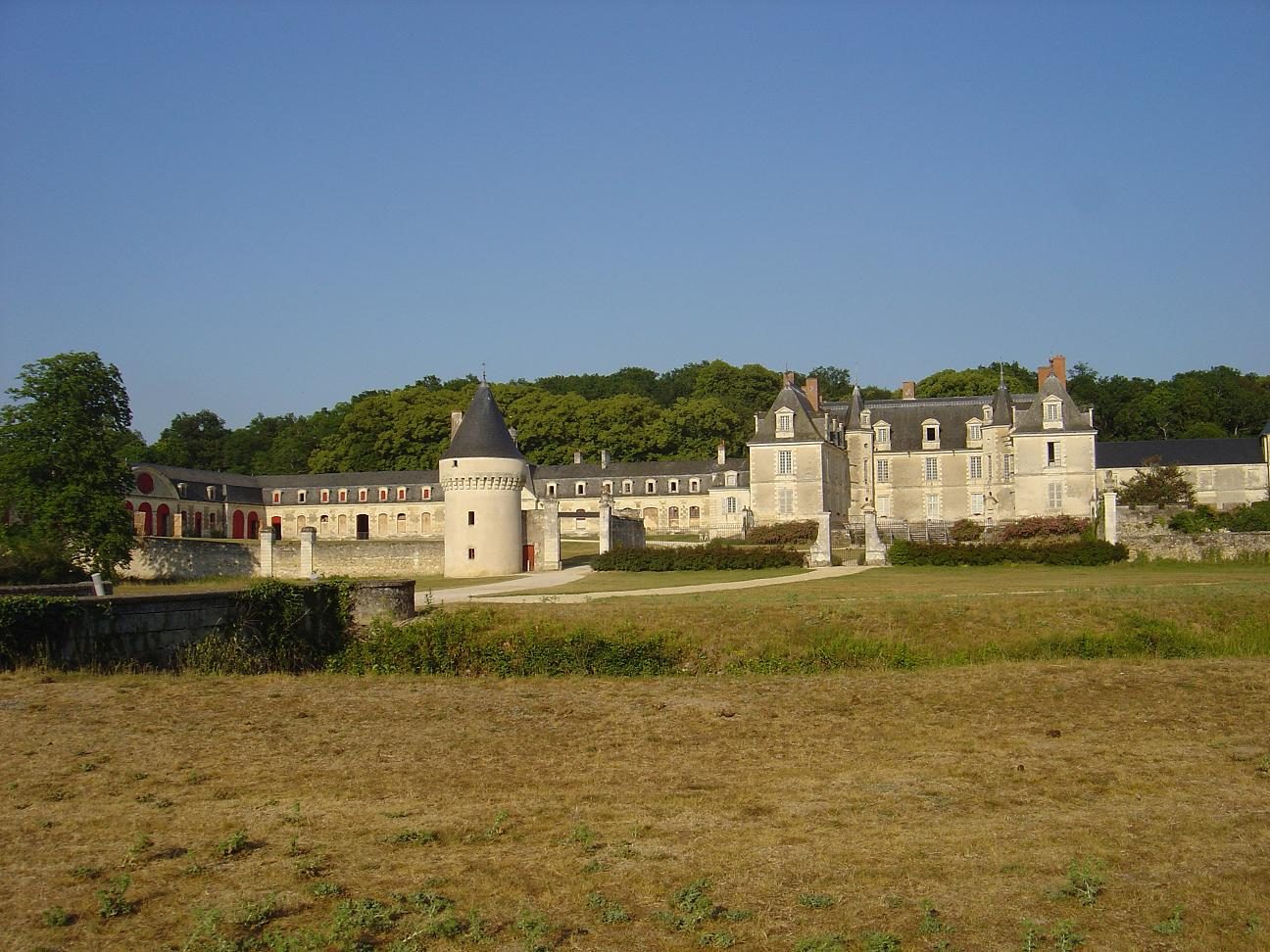
Château de Gizeux

The Château de Gizeux is an important edifice, dating from the Middle Ages and much altered over the centuries, notably during the French Renaissance and the Age of Enlightenment.

The Château de Gizeux in located in the commune of Gizeux in the Indre-et-Loire département of France, in what used to be the province of Anjou. It is one of the Châteaux of the Loire.

The château stands at the heart of the Parc naturel régional Loire-Anjou-Touraine. The building is 250 metres long, making it the longest château in Touraine angevine.

== Geography ==
The Château de Gizeux is situated some fifteen kilometres north of Bourgueil and 25 kilometres from Saumur, within the green and wooded parc naturel régional de Loire-Anjou-Touraine. It is midway between Angers and Tours.

The château was part of the former province of Anjou and today is in Touraine angevine. It was built on the site of a 14th-century castle.

== History ==
Château de Gizeux formerly in Anjou in the sénéchaussée of Saumur.

The manor of Gizeux belonged to the family of the poet Joachim du Bellay from 1315 to 1660.

The château then became the property of several marquises of Gizeux from the family of Contades.

In 1789, during the French Revolution, Prince Louis Gabriel de Contades (1759–1825), opposing the revolutionaries, had to flee from French soil and find refuge in Saint-Domingue. He only returned to Gizeux in 1801.

The Château de Gizeux was a dependency of the sénéchaussée de Saumur and the former province of Anjou.

In 1790, this part of Anjou, stretching from Bourgueil in the south to Château-la-Vallière in the north and including Gizeux, was attached to the département of Indre-et-Loire.

== Description ==
The buildings have conserved the parts built at different times. Thus, the medieval style mixes with that of the Renaissance.

The château has two large galleries of paintings: the Galerie François Ier (François I) decorated with Italian paintings form the start of the 17th century, and the Grande Galerie des Châteaux decorated with late 17th-century painting, including panels representing royal palaces and rural scenes covering more than 400 m^{2}.

The park land was established in 1829.

Nearby, a church houses the Du Bellays' splendid tombs. The extremely rare 17th-century orants were made of white marble by Ghislain (known as Cambrai), director of the Académie royale de peinture et sculpture in Paris.

The Château de Gizeux has been listed since 1945 as a monument historique by the French Ministry of Culture.

== See also ==
- List of castles in France
