= Jerry Michalski =

Editor

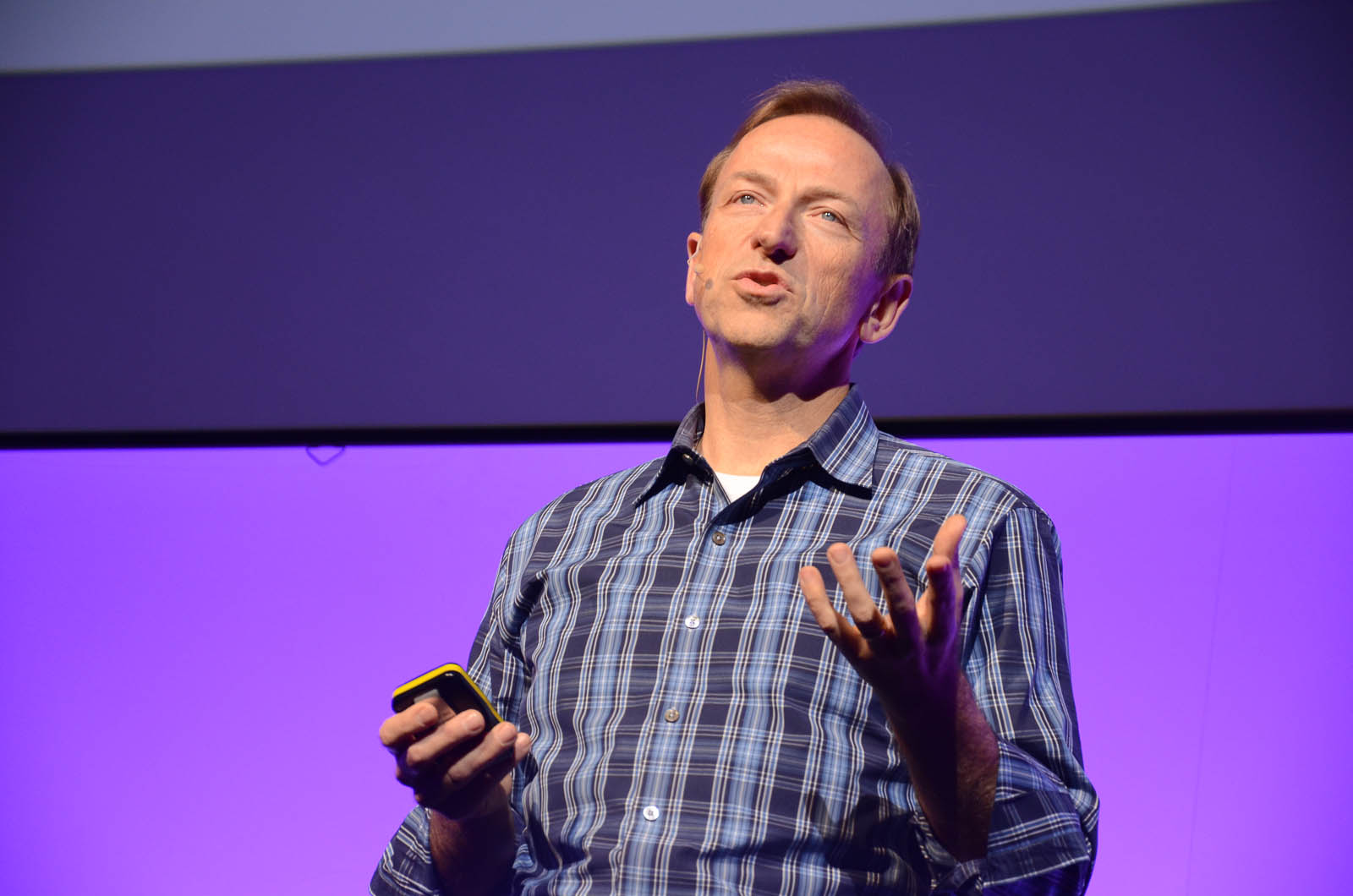
- Education: University of California, Irvine; Wharton School of the University of Pennsylvania
- Occupation: Technology consultant

Jerry Michalski is an American technology consultant. He is the former managing editor of Release 1.0, a technology newsletter. He is the founder of Sociate.com and ReX (Relationship Economy eXpedition).

== Education ==
Jerry Michalski graduated from the University of California, Irvine with a Bachelor of Arts degree in economics. He received a master in business administration from the Wharton School of the University of Pennsylvania.

== Career ==
Michalski served as the managing editor of Release 1.0, the newsletter published, and originally written and edited solely by Esther Dyson.

Michalski is the founder of Sociate.com. He is also the founder of ReX (Relationship Economy eXpedition). He has given lectures about the "economy of relationships" in front of think tanks like the Institute for the Future, where he argued that the thriving economies of the future will rest upon relationships.

Michalski is considered to be one of the Digerati. Michalski is one of the earliest users of the TheBrain mind mapping and personal knowledge base software, having amassed more than half a million nodes in 26 years of use.

== Boards ==
Michalski is a board member of Zev Shapiro's organization TurnUp
