= Freddy Michalski =

French translator (1946–2020)

- Born: 19 October 1946; Marles-les-Mines, France
- Died: 21 May 2020 (aged 73); Southern France
- Occupation: French

Freddy Michalski (19 October 1946 – 21 May 2020) was a French translator, who specialized in the translation of English language novels.

== Biography ==
An associate professor of English, Michalski has translated numerous crime fiction novels into French, including those of authors such as Edward Bunker, James Lee Burke, James Ellroy, William McIlvanney, Eoin McNamee, Eliot Pattison, Jim Nisbet, Chuck Palahniuk, Ian Rankin, and Don Winslow. He worked for Éditions du Masque, Éditions Gallimard, Éditions Robert Laffont, and Payot et Rivages.

In 1992, Michalski won a Trophée 813 for the translation of White Jazz by James Ellroy. Working for L'Œil d'or since 2004, he translated several works by Mark Twain, such as Adventures of Huckleberry Finn and A Connecticut Yankee in King Arthur's Court.

Freddy Michalski died on 21 May 2020 at the age of 73.
