= Sisley (company) =

French luxury cosmetics company

C.F.E.B. Sisley
- Traded as: Simplified joint stock company
- ISIN: 722-003-464
- Industry: manufacture of perfumes and toiletries
- Founded: 1972, 1976 (takeover)
- Founder: Roland de Saint-Vincent, Jean-François Laporte, Hubert d'Ornano
- Headquarters: Avenue de Friedland, Paris, France
- Website: https://www.sisley-paris.com/fr-FR/

CFEB Sisley, better known as Sisley Paris, is an independent French luxury cosmetic, skin care, hair care, and perfume company. The firm develops products based on active ingredients derived from plants for different skin types and different uses: moisturizing, anti-aging, sun care and makeup.

== History ==
In 1972 perfumer Jean-François Laporte and Roland de Saint-Vincent, created a perfume company. Hubert d'Ornano acquired this company in 1976, re-naming it Sisley in reference to the Impressionist painter.

Hubert d'Ornano reorganized the company and focused Sisley's research in phytocosmetology. He relied on the research of chemist Egmont Desperrois for his products. He came up with the idea to use essential oils and active ingredients extracted from plants in the beauty products.

== Operations ==
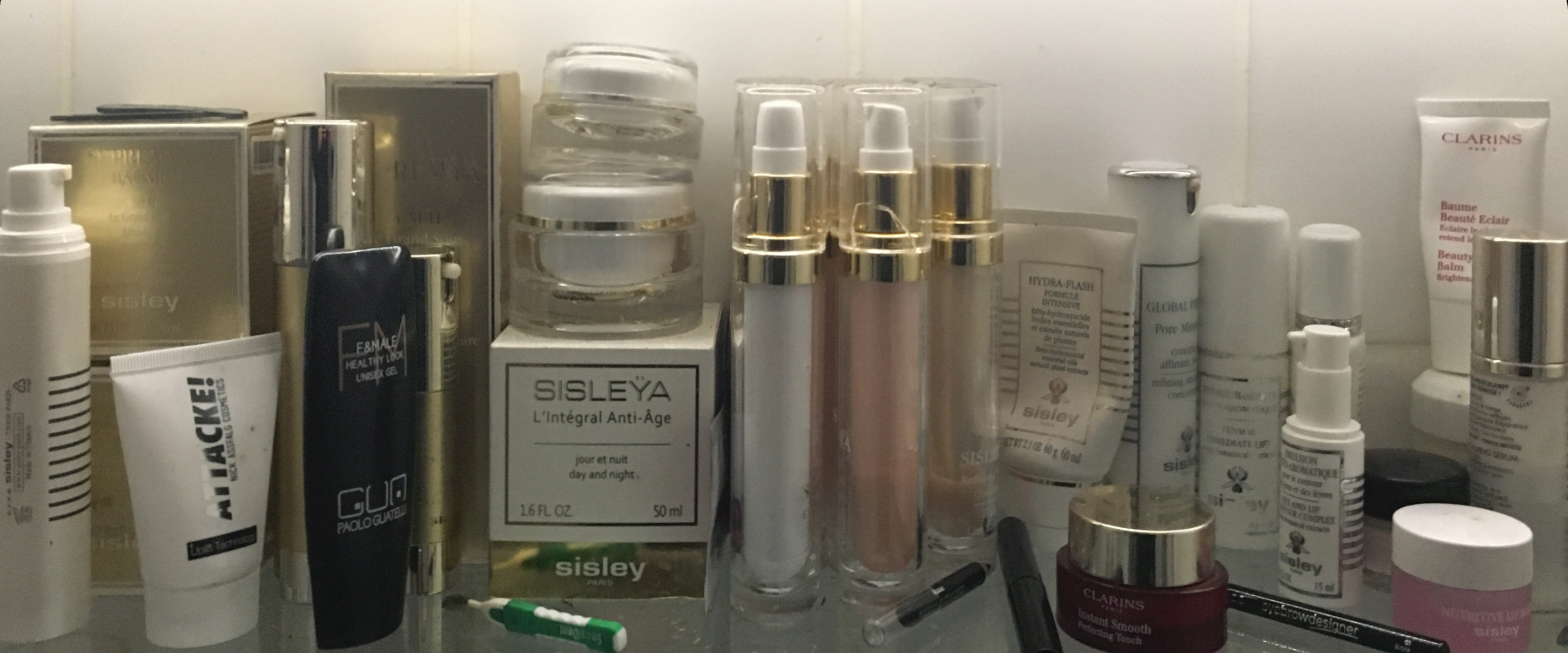
Various Sisley products, mainly skin care for women, together with products of other companies on a shelf in a bathroom, 2021

Sisley is a medium-sized business: in 2019, the group employed nearly 4,500 people internationally. Sisley's products are sold in department stores, pharmacies, spas and beauty salons. In recent years Sisley has also opened its own stores around the world. In 2019, there were about twenty boutiques and Maisons Sisley.

Sisley's headquarters is in Paris. The company designs and manufactures its products in France. France is the company's biggest market, followed by China.

== Philanthropy ==
Under the current head of the company, Philippe d'Ornano, the Sisley-d’Ornano Foundation was created in 2007 to "provide a framework for the charitable work and sponsorships led by the company". The Foundation is under the auspices of the Fondation de France.

== In popular culture ==
In a 2015 article by Gwyneth Paltrow's "lifestyle brand" GOOP, Sisley Paris, appears in a list of the 9 'Most Luxurious' body treatments in the world. Sisley is included for the Sisley Supremya Facial at the Sense Spa in the Carlyle Hotel, New York City, which involves "massaging a laundry list of wildly-expensive Sisley creams and serums into your skin." The at-home version of the experience from a "bottle of Supremya Night serum ($795, sisley-paris.com) costs more than the facial at the Carlyle; it does last longer, however".

The skincare range is mentioned on the popular Francophile website 'Everyday Parisian'; in an article about Sisley skincare features, one product is highlighted with "This one is a splurge but works the best!"

Sisley Sileÿa Eye and Lip Contour Cream (£115) appeared in a 2014 Guardian Beauty review, with the comment "you're paying for that umlaut [sic]".
