= Wrocław University of Economics =

Public university located in Wrocław, Poland

Coordinates: 51°5′29″N 17°1′30″E

Wroclaw University of Economics and Business
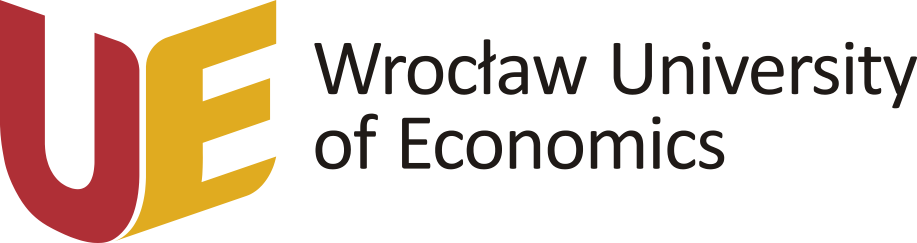
- Latin: Universitas Oeconomica Wratislaviensis
- Type: Public
- Established: 1954
- Academic staff: 784
- Students: 8,941
- Location: Wrocław
- Campus: Urban
- Website: https://www.ue.wroc.pl/en/

The Wroclaw University of Economics and Business (Uniwersytet Ekonomiczny we Wrocławiu) is one of ten public universities located in Wrocław, Poland. Originally established in 1947 as a private business school (then named Wyższa Szkoła Handlowa, or "Trade College"), it was nationalized in 1954 under the name Wyższa Szkoła Ekonomiczna ("College of Economics"). In October 1974 it was named after the Polish economist Oskar Lange, although his name does not occur in the official English name of the university. Changing the name to the Wrocław University of Economics (Uniwersytet Ekonomiczny we Wrocławiu) in 2008 removed Oskar Lange from the name of the university.

The main campus with three out of four departments is located on Ulica Komandorska near the center of Wrocław, whereas one faculty (Regional Economy and Tourism) resides in a separate campus in Jelenia Góra.

The university comprises the following schools (faculties):

- School of Economic Sciences
- School of Engineering and Economics
- School of Management, Computer Science and Finance
- School of Economics, Management and Tourism (Jelenia Góra)

Altogether it employs 784 academic teachers including 142 professors. There is strong interest in economic studies, in the 2023/2024 academic year the university has 8,941 students. It has produced over 70,000 graduates.

== Rectors ==
- Kamil Stefko (1947–1950)
- Stefan Górniak (1950–1952)
- Antoni Wrzosek (1952–1955)
- Krzysztof Jeżowski (1955–1956)
- Wincenty Styś (1956–1959)
- Adam Chełmoński (1959)
- Józef Fiema (1955–1966)
- Józef Popkiewicz (1966–1979)
- Józef Kaleta (1979–1987)
- Wiesław Pluta (1987–1990)
- Józef Kaleta (1990–1993)
- Andrzej Baborski (1993–1999)
- Marian Noga (1999–2005)
- Bogusław Fiedor (2005-2012)
- Andrzej Gospodarowicz (2012-2016)
- Andrzej Kaleta (since 2016)

== Researchers and alumni ==
- Leszek Czarnecki – Polish billionaire
- Grzegorz Marek Michalski – economist
- Mateusz Morawiecki – Prime Minister of Poland
- Marian Noga – Monetary Policy Council
- Jerzy Szmajdziński – Minister of National Defence

== Gallery ==
Gallery of the University
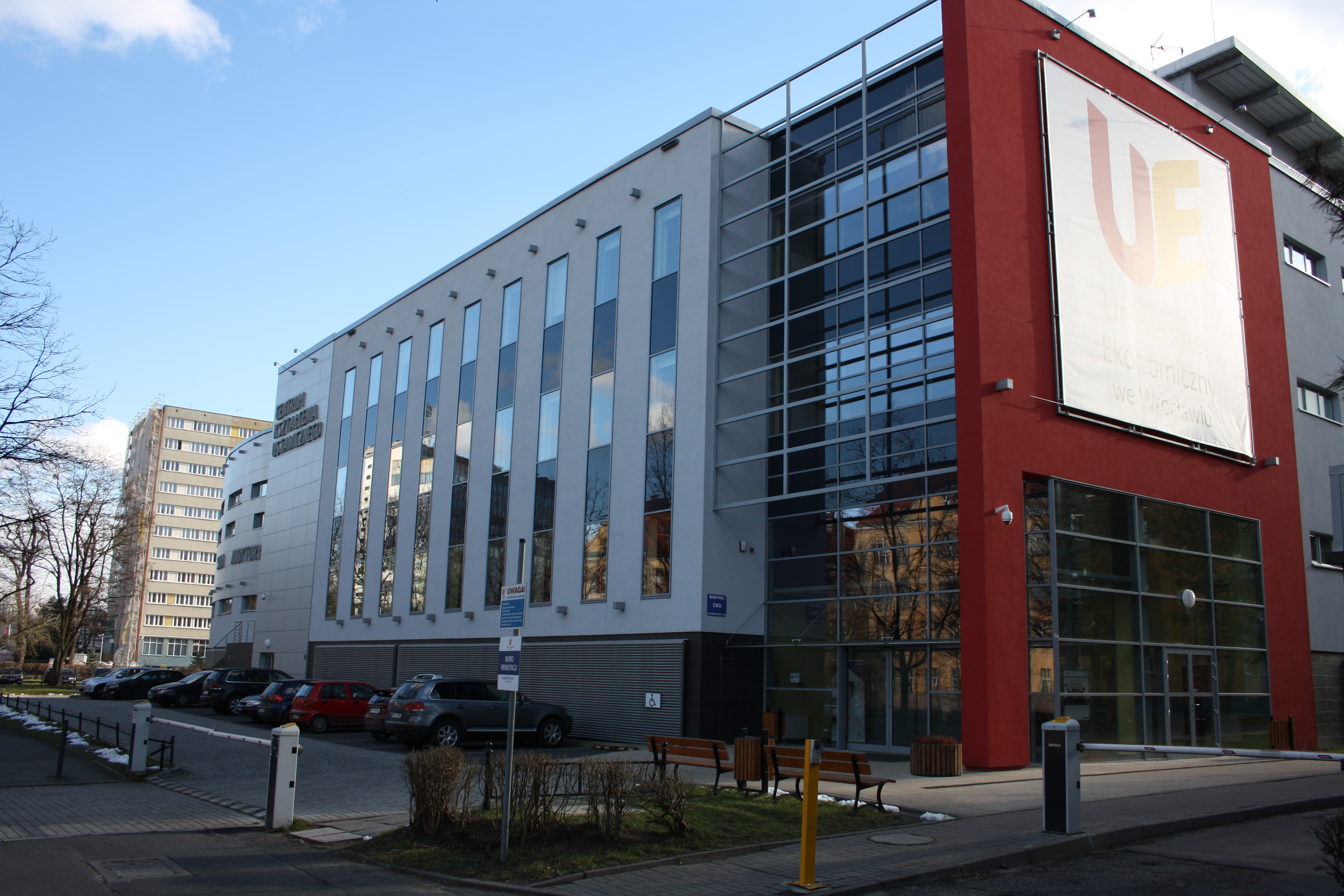
View from west on the CKU-building

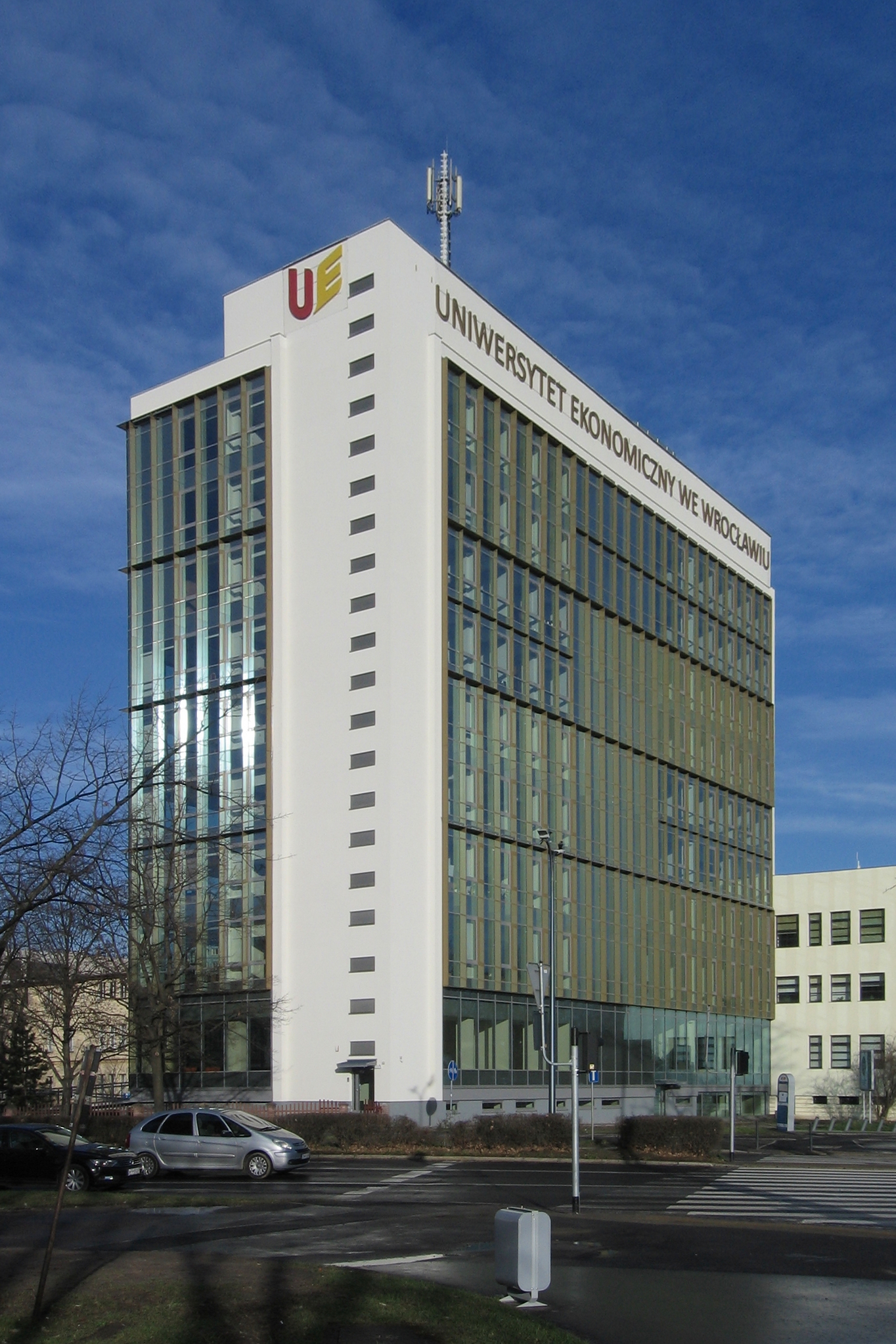
Z building

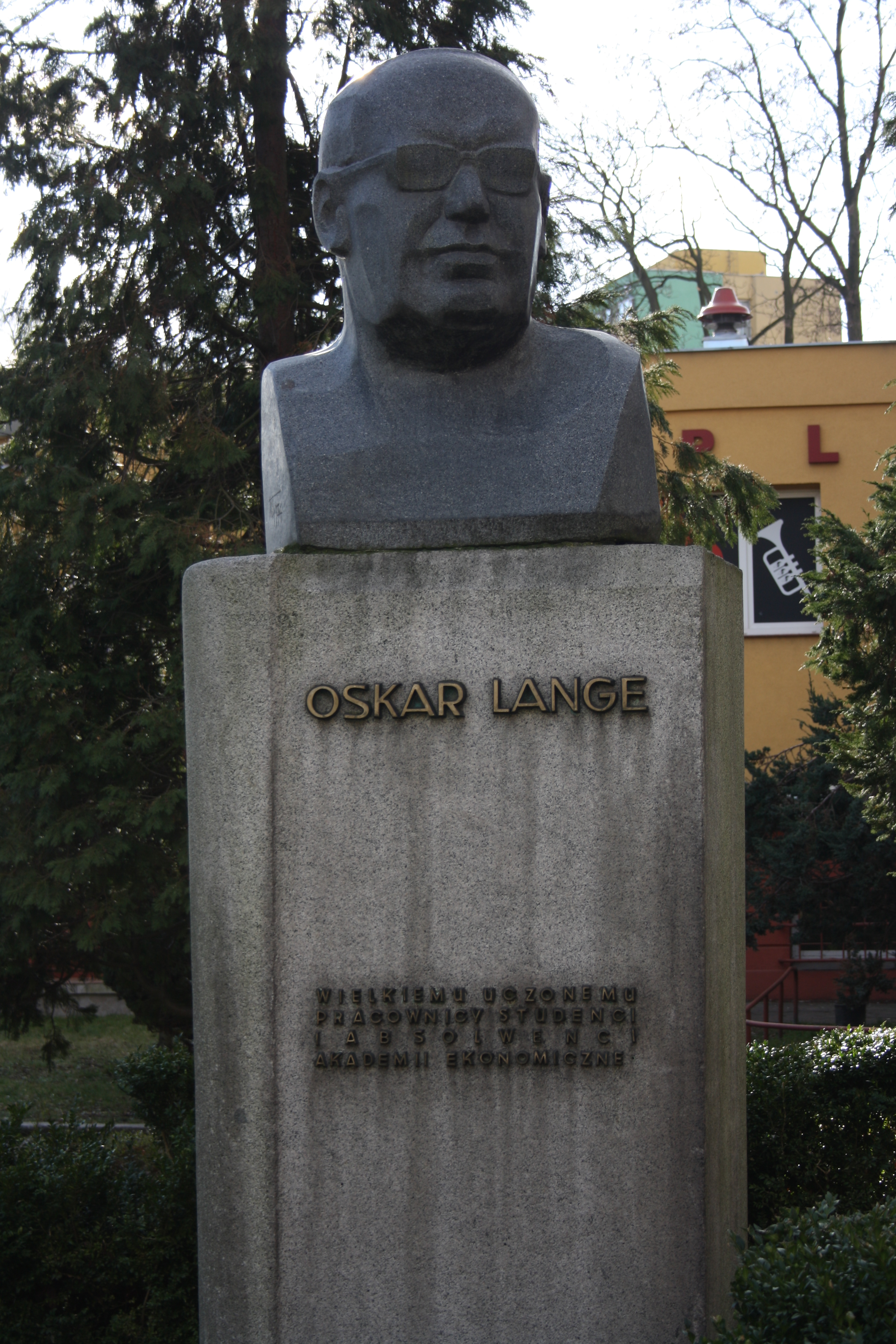
Oskar Lange monument

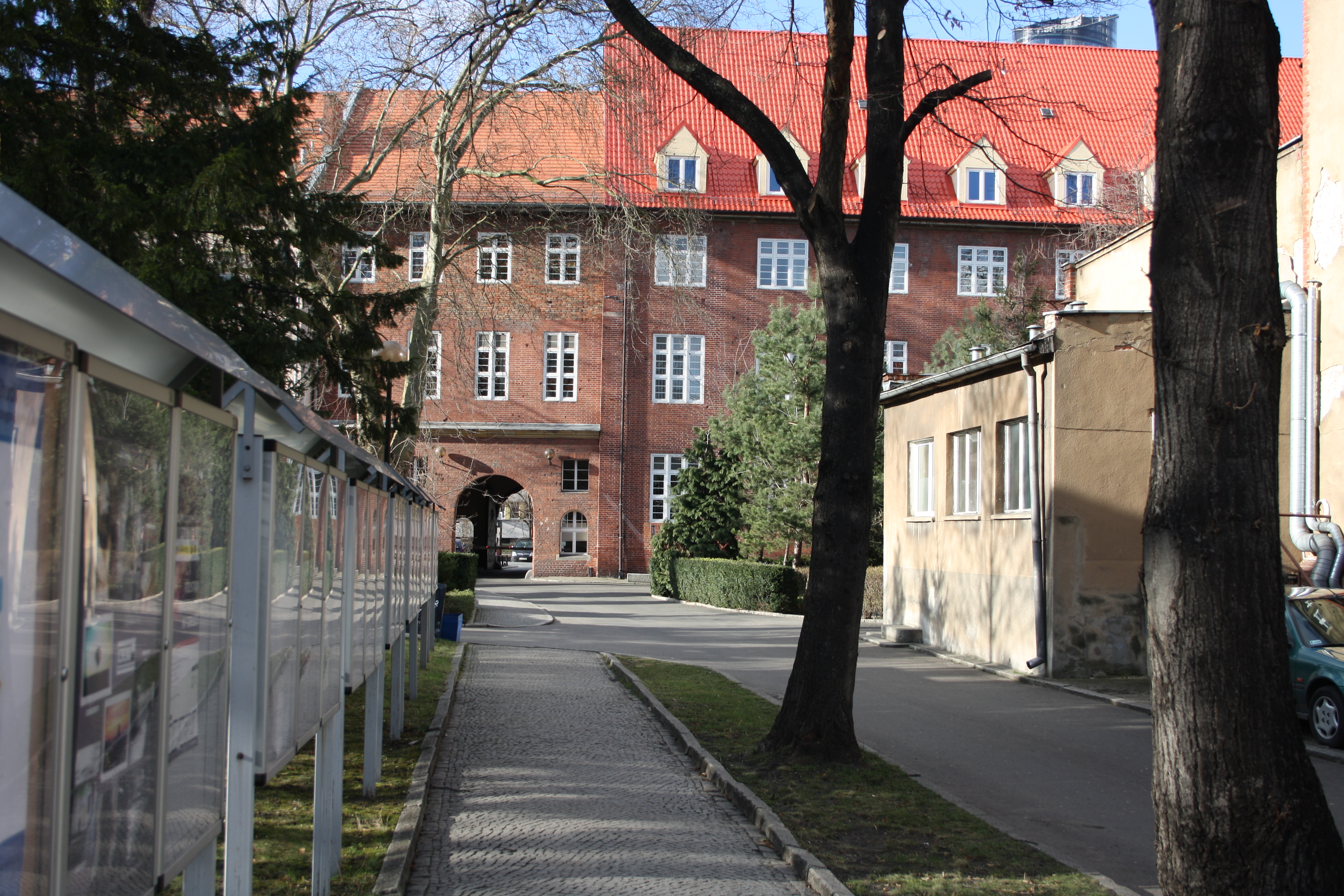
Campus

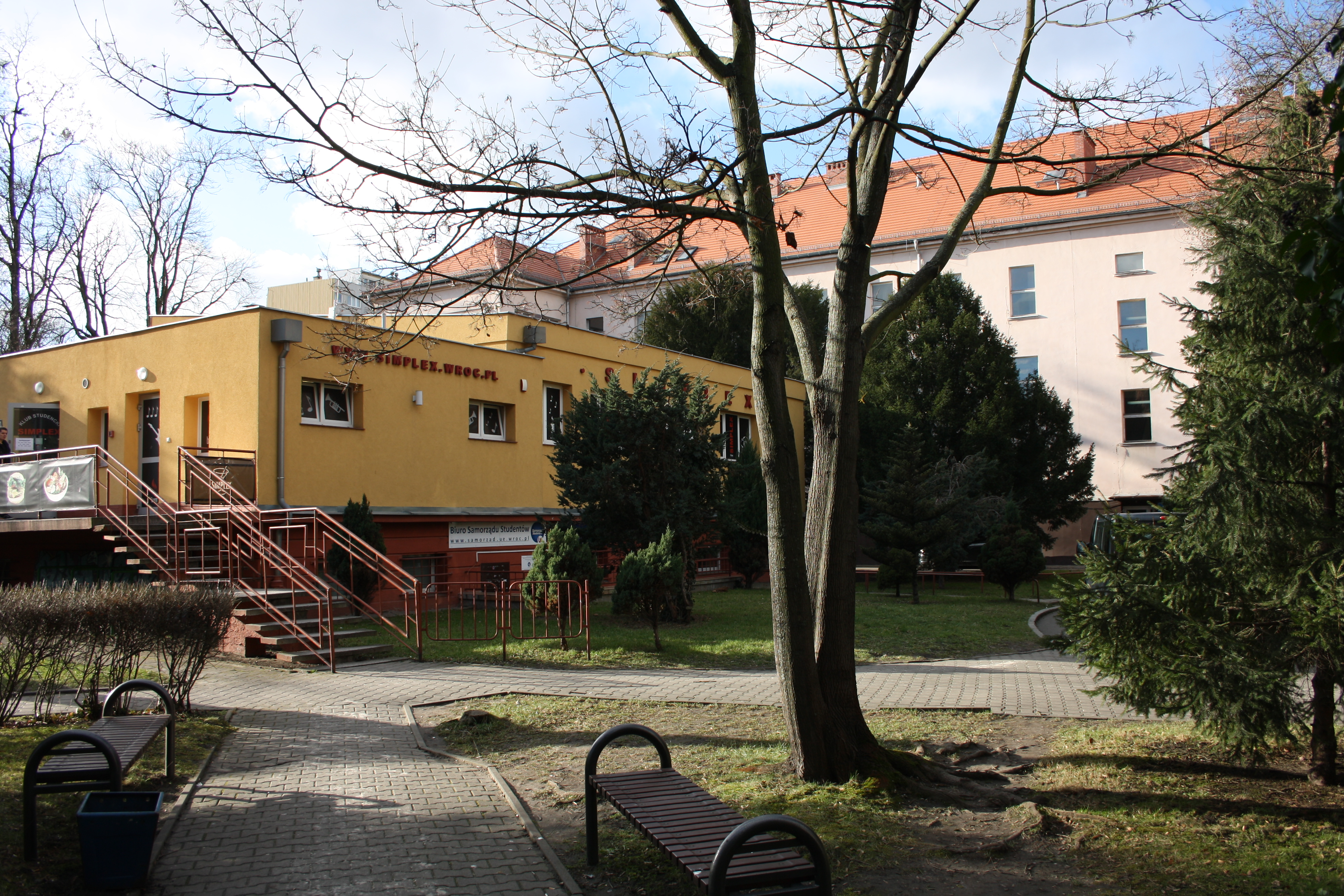
Simplex - East South Perspective
