= Gizeux =

- Commune
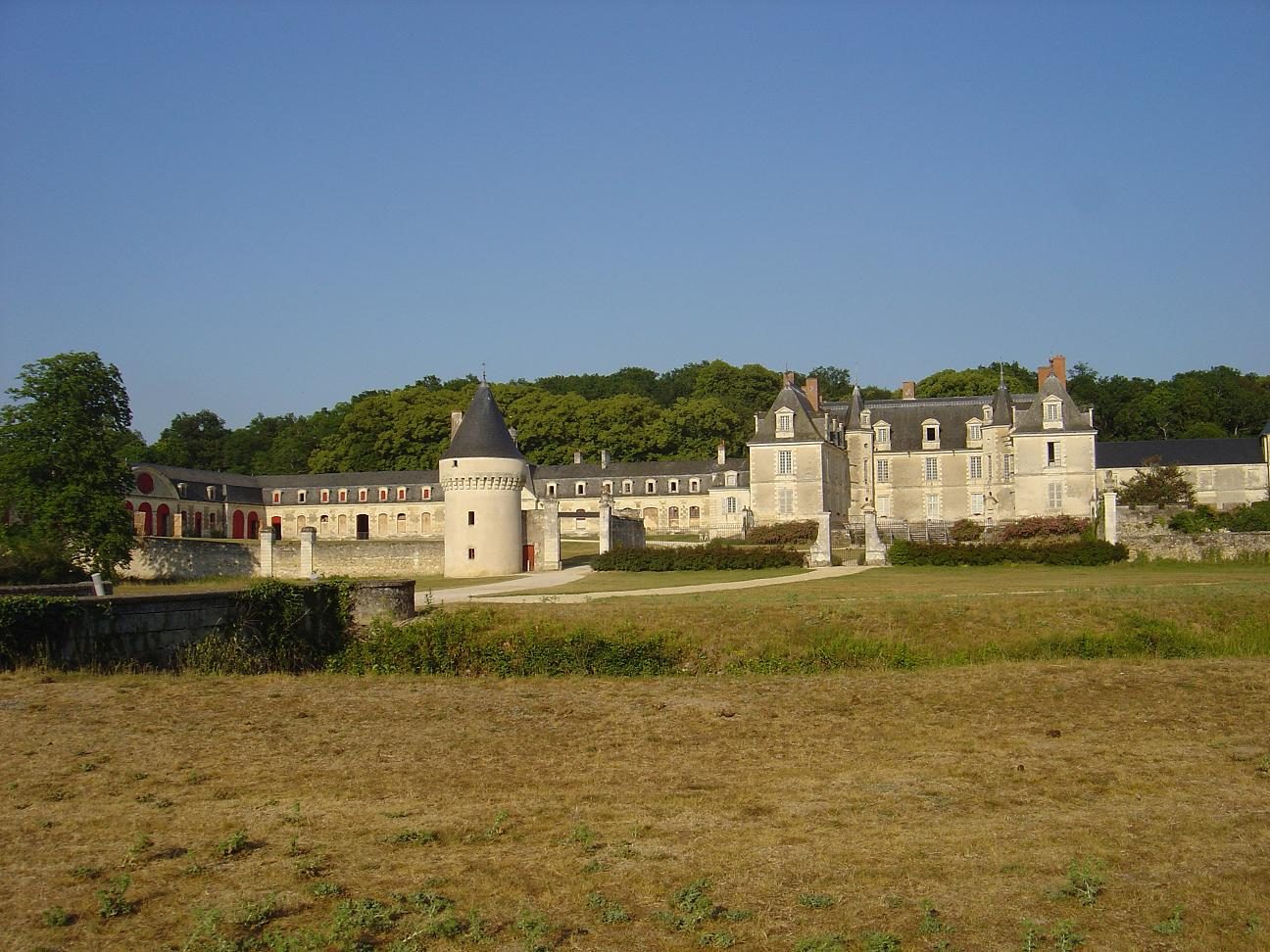
- Chateau
- Location of Gizeux
- Location within France Location within Centre-Val de Loire
- Coordinates: 47°23′36″N 0°11′46″E
- Country: France
- Region: Centre-Val de Loire
- Department: Indre-et-Loire
- Arrondissement: Chinon
- Canton: Langeais

Government
  - Mayor (2020–2026): Thierry Beaupied
- Area^{1}: 21.06 km^{2} (8.13 sq mi)
- Highest elevation: 108 m (354 ft)
- Lowest elevation: 47 m (154 ft)
- Population (2023): 382
  - Density: 18.1/km^{2} (47.0/sq mi)
- Time zone: UTC+01:00 (CET)
  - Summer (DST): UTC+02:00 (CEST)
- INSEE/Postal code: 37112 /37340
- ^{1} French Land Register data, which excludes lakes, ponds, glaciers > 1 km^{2} (0.386 sq mi or 247 acres) and river estuaries.

Gizeux (French pronunciation: [ʒizø]) is a commune in the Indre-et-Loire department in central France.

== Population ==
Historical population
Year	Pop.	±% p.a.
1968	606	—
1975	643	+0.85%
1982	536	−2.57%
1990	510	−0.62%
1999	427	−1.95%
2007	448	+0.60%
2012	422	−1.19%
2017	390	−1.56%
2023	382	−0.34%
Source: INSEE

The inhabitants are called Gizellois in French.

== See also ==
- Communes of the Indre-et-Loire department
