= Château de Montgeoffroy =

Coordinates: 47°28′8″N 0°16′35″W

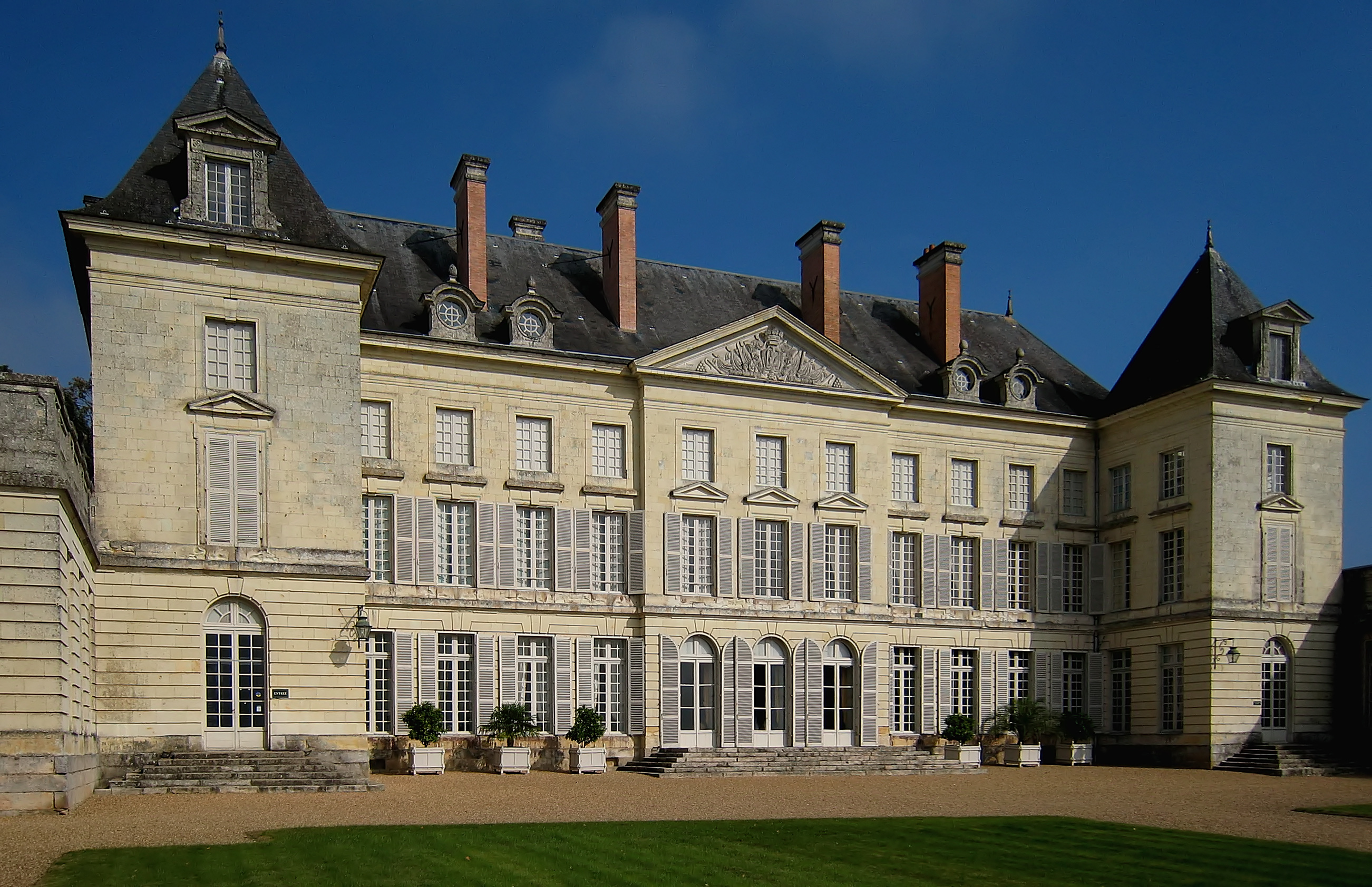
Château de Montgeoffroy.

The Château de Montgeoffroy (French pronunciation: [ʃato də mɔ̃ʒɔfʁwa]) is an 18th-century manor house located in the commune of Mazé (Maine-et-Loire), France.

== History ==
In 1676, Érasme de Contades acquired the property. In 1772, Marshal Louis Georges Érasme de Contades, governor of Alsace, decided to rebuild the château as a retirement home. He called on the Parisian architect Jean-Benoît-Vincent Barré, who worked with the local architect Simier.

The marshal being far from Anjou, the work was directed primarily by his son, le marquis de Contades, his daughter-in-law, Julie Constantin de Marans, his mistress, Hélène Hérault, and her daughter-in-law, Marie-Marguerite Magon de La Lande. It took three years.

The old château was burned down, but Barré appreciated its U shape and kept two towers and the moat, as well as the chapel, which dated from 1543.

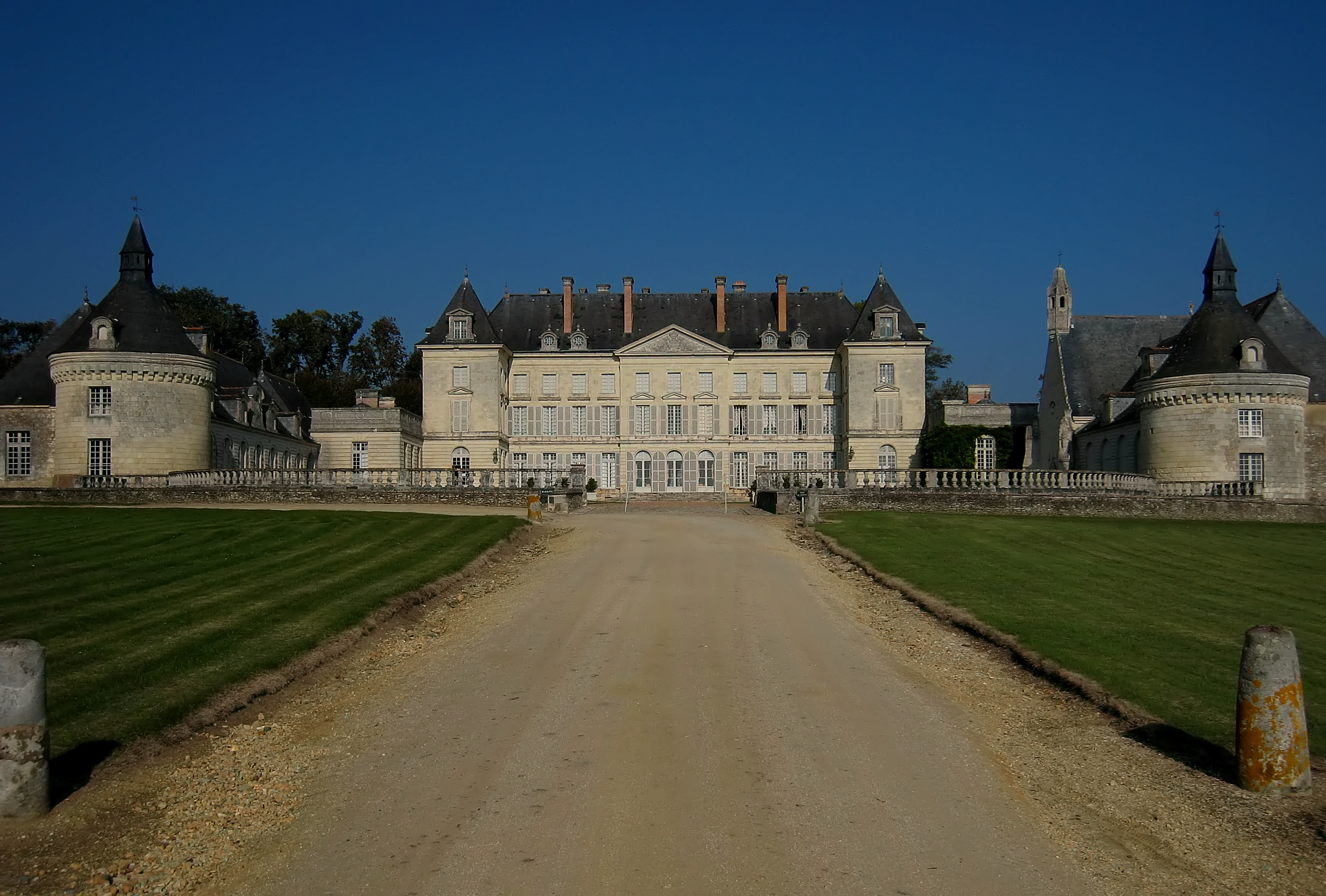

The building miraculously survived the French Revolution and the Revolt in the Vendée conserving its common buildings, agricultural structures, chapel, and park. It also kept its archives and its furniture, which was studied by Pierre Verlet.
