= Louis Georges Érasme de Contades =

Marshal of France (1704–1795)

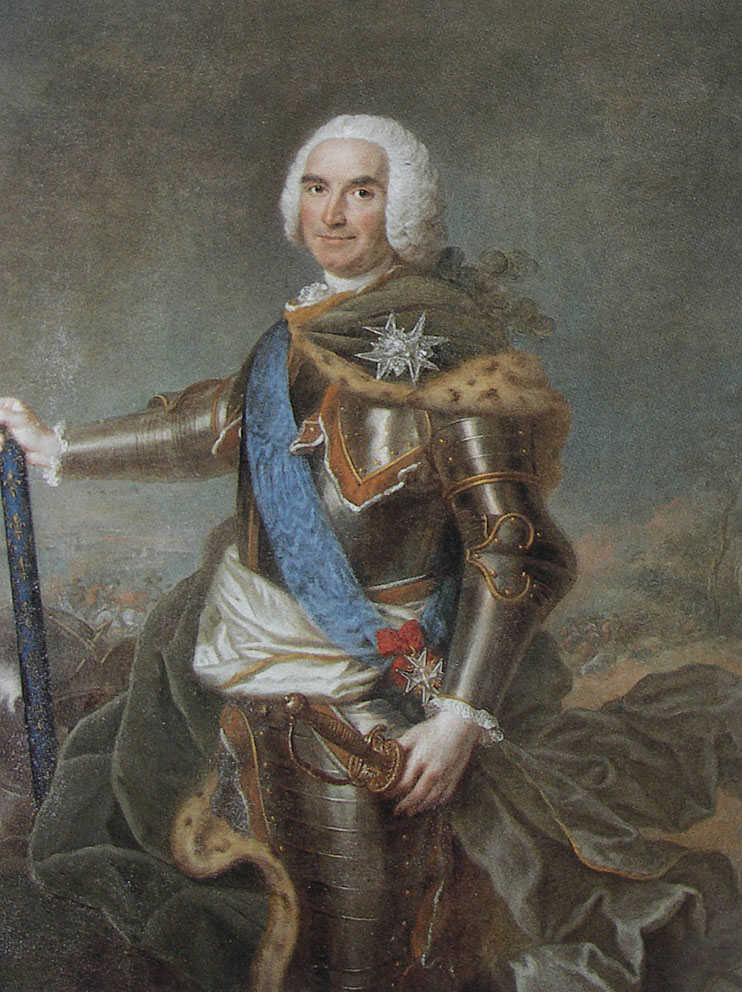
The Marquis of Contades

Louis Georges Érasme de Contades, Marquis de Contades (French pronunciation: [lwi ʒɔʁʒ eʁasm də kɔ̃tad]; 19 October 1704 – 19 January 1795), Seigneur de Montgeoffroy, was a Marshal of France and a major battlefield commander during the Seven Years' War. He notably commanded the French forces at the 1759 Battle of Minden.

== Early life ==
He was born on 19 October 1704 in Gizeux, in the Province of Anjou. He was the son of Gaspard de Contades (b. 1666) and his wife Jeanne-Marie Crespin de La Chabosselaye.

== Career ==
On 1734, he was created a Brigadier; in 1740 Maréchal de camp; and in 1745 Lieutenant Général. He took command of the French Army of Westphalia in 1758 during the Seven Years' War due to dissatisfaction with the previous commanders. He was unable to stem the French withdrawal across the Rhine, which had undone France's conquest of Hanover.

On 24 August 1758, he was created Maréchal de France. On 1 August 1759, he led the French forces at the Battle of Minden, where they were routed. This largely halted France's offensive in Germany that year, and had wider strategic ramifications. He was subsequently relieved of his command.

In 1762, Contades was appointed governor of Alsace. In 1788, Contades became governor of Lorraine.

== Personal life ==
In October 1724, he married Marie-Françoise Magon, daughter of François Magon, with issue:

- Georges Gaspard François Auguste Jean Baptiste de Contades (1726–1794), who succeeded his father as the Marquis de Contades.
- Françoise-Gertrude de Contades (1727–1776), who married Jean Charles Pierre de La Haye de Plouer.
- Adrien-Maurice de Contades (b. 1736)

About 1737, he had an affair with Marie-Hélène Moreau de Séchelles. He was reputed to be the father of:

- Jean-Baptiste Martin Hérault de Séchelles (the father of Marie-Jean Hérault de Séchelles)

He died at Livry on 19 January 1795.
