= New Elstree Studios =

Former film studios in England

- Alternative names: Danziger Studios

General information
- Type: Film studios
- Location: Elstree Road, Elstree, Hertfordshire, United Kingdom
- Coordinates: 51.6427°N 0.3146°W
- Construction started: 1955
- Completed: 1957
- Inaugurated: 1956
- Owner: Danziger Brothers

Technical details
- Floor area: 7.5 acres (3.0 ha)

New Elstree Studios was a British film studio complex that was the main production centre for the Danziger Brothers from 1956 to 1962, and was one of several sites collectively known as "Elstree Studios". 60 B-movies and 350 half-hour TV episodes were filmed there, for both British and American markets.

== History ==
Edward and Harry Danziger were American-born brothers who moved to Britain in 1952 and began making television films, using resources at various facilities including London's Riverside Studios, Shepperton, Borehamwood and Nettlefold.

In 1955, the Danzigers decided to form their own studio base and founded the New Elstree Studios in Hertfordshire. They converted a former wartime aero-engine testing factory, west of the Aldenham Reservoir near the village of Elstree, into a studio with six sound stages and exterior shooting facilities. The 7.5-acre (3.0 ha) site employed 200 and was used mainly for second features and television series, to be sold in both Britain and America. It cost £700,000 to build and equip.

The Danzigers' aim was to produce films as quickly and as cheaply as possible, regardless of quality. By the time of the studios' official opening in 1956, over twenty productions had already been filmed there. The studios operated as an assembly line, producing some 60 B-movies and 350 half-hour TV episodes between 1955 and 1961, typically producing two TV episodes a week, or a second feature in ten days.

The site was closed in 1962 and sold to RTZ Metals in October 1965 for warehouse storage. Since the late 1980s, the site has been occupied by the Waterfront Business Park on the A411 Elstree Road.

A documentary, The Danziger Studios Story, was produced and directed by Derek Pykett in 2023 and premiered on Talking Pictures TV on 7 August 2025, including interviews with Trader Faulkner, Sheila Whittingham, Brian Cobby, Geoffrey Bayldon, Bob Jordan, Geoffrey Holman, Brian Clemens, Jill Hyem, Brian Taylor, Ian Gregory and Francis Matthews.

== List of films shot at New Elstree Studios ==
This is a chronological list of films (including television series on film) that were shot at New Elstree Studios. All were produced by Danziger Productions or Danziger Photoplays, except those indicated otherwise.

- Sailor of Fortune (M.E. Films/Mid Ocean Productions for ITV; 1956; TV series shot on film)
- Satellite in the Sky (1956)
- Atom at Spithead (Sterling Films; 1956)
- The Depraved (1957)
- Quatermass 2 (Hammer Film Productions/Clarion Film Productions; 1957)
- Operation Murder (1957)
- Three Sundays to Live (1957)
- The Betrayal (1957)
- Three Crooked Men (1957)
- The Traitor (Fantur Films; 1957)
- Count Five and Die (Twentieth Century/Zonic Films; 1957)
- Saber of London (1958; TV series shot on film)
- Up the Creek (Byron Film; 1958)
- A Woman of Mystery (1958)
- High Jump (1959)
- Man Accused (1959)
- Crash Drive (1959)
- Date at Midnight (1959)
- Escort for Hire (1960)
- The Nudist Story (1960)
- An Honourable Murder (1960)
- The Tell-Tale Heart (1960)
- The Spider's Web (1960)
- Compelled (1960)
- Sentenced for Life (1960)
- Night Train for Inverness (1960)
- Man from Interpol (1960; TV series shot on film)
- Feet of Clay (1960)
- A Taste of Money (1960)
- Two Wives at One Wedding (1961)
- So Evil, So Young (1961)
- Highway to Battle (1961)
- The Middle Course (1961)
- Return of a Stranger (1961)
- The Gentle Terror (1961)
- Strip Tease Murder (1961)
- The Court Martial of Major Keller (1961)
- Operation Stogie (1962)
- The Pursuers (1962)
- Three Spare Wives (1962)
- The Durant Affair (1962)
- The Lamp in Assassin Mews (1962)
- The Battleaxe (1962)
- The Spanish Sword (1962)
- Richard the Lionheart (1962–1963; TV series shot on film)

=== Other Danziger productions ===
The following films were produced by the Danzigers, and are therefore very likely to have been shot at New Elstree Studios, but it is possible that a small number were shot elsewhere.

- Son of a Stranger (1957)
- Innocent Meeting (1958)
- Links of Justice (1958)
- Moment of Indiscretion (1958)
- No Safety Ahead (1958)
- On the Run (1958)
- The Great Van Robbery (1958)
- A Woman Possessed (1958)
- The Child and the Killer (1959)
- Top Floor Girl (1959)
- Web of Suspicion (1959)
- Woman's Temptation (1959)
- Identity Unknown (1960)
- Transatlantic (1960)
- The Cheaters (Danziger Productions for ABC; 1960–1962; TV series shot on film)
- Fate Takes a Hand (1961)
- Part-Time Wife (1961)
- Tarnished Heroes (1961)
- The Silent Invasion (1962)
- What Every Woman Wants (1962)
- She Always Gets Their Man (1962)

== See also ==
- Category:Films shot at New Elstree Studios
- Category:Television shows shot at New Elstree Studios
- Lists of productions shot at the other Elstree studios:
  - List of films and television shows shot at Elstree Studios
  - List of films and television shows shot at Clarendon Road Studios
  - Gate Studios § Films shot at the studios
  - British and Dominions Imperial Studios § Films shot at Imperial Studios
  - List of films shot at MGM-British Studios, Elstree
