= Howard Lang =

English actor (1911–1989)

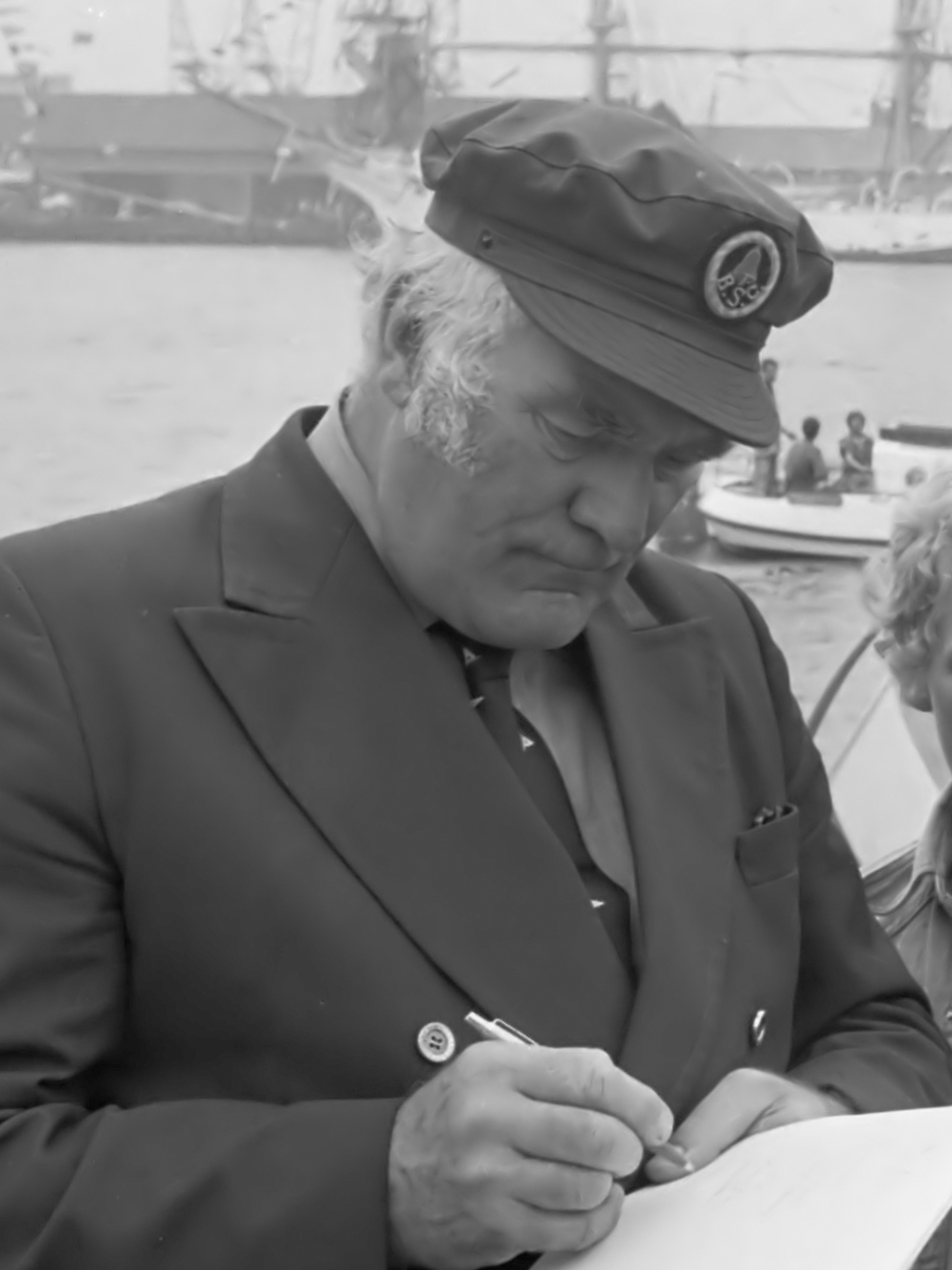
- Howard Lang (1975)
- Born: Donald Yarranton; 20 March 1911; Marylebone, London, England
- Died: 11 December 1989 (age 78); West Hampstead, London, England
- Occupation: Actor
- Years active: 1946–1986

Howard Lang (born Donald Yarranton; 20 March 1911 – 11 December 1989) was an English actor known for playing Captain William Baines in the BBC nautical drama The Onedin Line.

== Early life ==
Lang was born in Marylebone, London, the son of Edward John Yarranton (1884–1954) and Clara Ann (née Malkin) (1888–1921). His father had left the family's bookbinding business to become a senior commercial traveller for Winsor & Newton, the manufacturer of artists' materials.

Lang served for seven years in the Royal Navy including during World War II. In January 1941 he was appointed Temporary Sub-Lieutenant, and in January 1942 Temporary Lieutenant, a position he held until the end of the war.

His younger brother from his father's second marriage was Sir Peter Yarranton (1924–2003), chairman of the United Kingdom Sports Council from 1989 to 1994, and a notable figure in the world of rugby union, both as a player and as an administrator, for more than 40 years.

== Acting career ==
For his role as seafaring Captain Baines in The Onedin Line (1971–1980) he gained international attention. In a 1977 interview in Radio Times Lang recalled a personal appearance in Norway:

When the series was first shown in Norway I was asked to make a personal appearance in a small shipbuilding town. As I was brought into Grimstad by sea I caught sight of huge crowds – all of 3,000 townsfolk out on the quay to greet me. I learned afterwards that I had been received as family because almost every home had an ancient photograph of an uncle, cousin or grandfather dressed and sideburned precisely as I appear on The Onedin Line.

Lang's other parts included roles in The Six Wives of Henry VIII (1970), Z-Cars, Softly, Softly, The Vise, and an appearance as caveman Horg in three of the four episodes of the first Doctor Who story, An Unearthly Child. He also played Winston Churchill in the 1983 TV miniseries The Winds of War.

He also played the role of Bert Hudd in the first production of Harold Pinter's first play,The Room.

In an early seafaring role, he had a cameo in Ben-Hur as the hortator aboard a Roman galley leading up to the epic battle with an enemy fleet.

Howard Lang died in West Hampstead, London in 1989.

== Filmography ==
=== Film ===
Year	Title	Role	Notes
1940	The Middle Watch	Sailor	Uncredited
1940	Convoy	Gunnery officer	Uncredited
1940	Night Train to Munich	Concentration camp guard	Uncredited
1940	Neutral Port	German naval officer	Uncredited
1941	Freedom Radio	Radio operator	Uncredited
1946	Great Expectations	Man at Magwitch's Trial	Uncredited
1947	So Well Remembered	Man at Royal Opera House	Uncredited
1947	Jassy	Juryman	Uncredited
1948	Nothing Venture	Henchman in restaurant	Uncredited
1948	Hamlet	Servant	Uncredited
1948	The Last Load	Senior police officer	Uncredited
1950	The Mudlark	Footman	Uncredited
1951	Pool of London	Detective detaining suspect	Uncredited
1951	Captain Horatio Hornblower	Officer aboard Cassandra	Uncredited
1951	The Lavender Hill Mob	Policeman at window	Uncredited
1951	High Treason	Policeman	Uncredited
1953	Street of Shadows	Card player	Uncredited
1953	The Missing Man	Inspector Haslett	Uncredited
1953	Counterspy	Policeman	
1954	The Floating Dutchman	Gaoler	Uncredited
1954	The Blazing Caravan	Publican	Uncredited
1954	The House Across the Lake	Inspector Edgar	Uncredited
1954	The Rainbow Jacket	Police Constable	Uncredited
1954	Beau Brummell	Heckler	Uncredited
1954	The Men of Sherwood Forest	Town Crier	
1954	Devil's Point	Marne, company executive	Uncredited
1954	Fabian of the Yard - Bombs in Piccadilly	Harry	Uncredited
1955	The Mysterious Bullet	Davy Charlesworth	
1955	Stolen Time	Scotland Yard detective	
1956	Keep It Clean	Police Sergeant	
1956	Eyewitness	Cinema Commissionaire	Uncredited
1956	Destination Death	Police Sgt	Uncredited
1956	The Battle of the River Plate	Guns – HMS Exeter	Uncredited
1956	Tiger in the Smoke	Detective	Uncredited
1956	The Hideout	Greeko	
1957	The Crooked Sky	Commissioner	
1957	The Big Chance	Saw Mill Man	
1957	The Birthday Present	Cellblock Officer	Uncredited
1957	The One That Got Away	Sergeant, Welsh Guards	Uncredited
1958	Dunkirk	Chief, Sheerness Dockyard	Uncredited
1958	A Night to Remember	Chief Officer Henry Wilde – Titanic	Uncredited
1958	Links of Justice	Court Usher	
1958	Corridors of Blood	Chief Inspector	Uncredited
1958	Nowhere to Go	Sergeant at safe deposit facility	Uncredited
1959	Behemoth the Sea Monster	Naval Commander	Uncredited
1959	Innocent Meeting	Macey	
1959	Four Desperate Men	Whitsun	Uncredited
1959	A Woman's Temptation	Radio operator	Uncredited
1959	Man Accused	Police Sergeant	Uncredited
1959	Ben-Hur	Hortator	Uncredited
1959	Date at Midnight	Inspector	
1960	Night Train for Inverness	Sergeant	
1960	Jackpot	George	
1960	The Day They Robbed the Bank of England	Bank security officer	Uncredited
1960	The Trials of Oscar Wilde	Court Usher	
1960	Make Mine Mink	Policeman on beat	Uncredited
1960	The World of Suzie Wong	Dinner guest	Uncredited
1961	Gorgo	First Colonel	
1961	Feet of Clay	Warder	
1961	No Love for Johnnie	Labour Party member	Uncredited
1961	The Curse of the Werewolf	Irate Farmer	Uncredited
1961	On the Fiddle	Recruiting officer	Uncredited
1961	The Court Martial of Major Keller	Sergeant Purvey	Uncredited
1962	The Boys	Commissionaire at cinema	Uncredited
1963	The Haunting	Hugh Crain	Uncredited
1964	The Runaway	Norring	
1964	Nothing but the Best	Jutson	
1965	He Who Rides a Tiger	Prison Governor	
1965	The Scales of Justice - Personal and Confidental	Abbott	
1967	Frankenstein Created Woman	Guard	Uncredited
1970	Perfect Friday	Bank Commissionaire	
1971	10 Rillington Place	Man in Pub	Uncredited
1971	Macbeth	Old Soldier	Uncredited

=== Television ===
Year	Title	Episode(s)	Role	Network	Archive status
1952	BBC Sunday-Night Theatre	Series 3, Episode 29: Arrow to the Heart Pt. 1	Courier pilot	BBC Television Service	Missing
1953	BBC Sunday-Night Theatre	Series 4, Episode 32: Sounding Brass Pt. 1	Sir John Lowther	BBC Television Service	Missing
1953	Reggie Little at Large	Episode 1: All in a Day's Work	P.C. Fine	BBC Television Service	Missing
1954	The Vise	Series 1, Episodes 4 & 22: Dr. Damon's Experiment /Behind the Mask	Doctor at Congress / Police Inspector (uncredited)	ABC	Exists
1955	The Vise	Series 2, Episode 8: The Broken Link	Police Sergeant	ABC	Missing
1955	The Hole in the Wall	TV Movie	2nd policeman	BBC Television Service	Missing
1955	BBC Sunday-Night Theatre	Series 6, Episode 44: The Makepeace Story #3: Family Business	Party guest	BBC Television Service	Missing
1956	ITV Play of the Week	Series 1, Episode 37: Come Read Me a Riddle	George Hutton	ITV	Missing
1956	The Adventures of the Big Man	Episodes 9-11: Say Hello / Lady Killer / The Thief	Balford	BBC Television Service	Exists
1956	The Crime of the Century	Episodes 1 & 4: The Death of a Canary / Major Trump	Mr. Barton	BBC Television Service	Partial (episode 1 survives)
1956	The Adventures of Robin Hood	Series 2, Episodes 9 & 22: Isabella / Flight from France	Landlord / Inn patron (uncredited)	ITV (ATV)	Exists
1957	ITV Television Playhouse	Series 2, Episode 44: And So to Bed	Watchman	ITV	Missing
1957	Overseas Press Club – Exclusive!	Episode 11: The Unknown Man	Polish bosun	ITV	Exists
1957	O.S.S.	Episodes 2 & 3: Operation Tulip / Operation Powder Puff	Bruehl / Jean	ITV (ATV)	Exists
1957	White Hunter	Episode 4: The No-Account	Burrows	ITV (ITC)	Exists
1958	O.S.S.	Episode 17: Operation Firefly	First farmer	ITV (ATV)	Exists
1958	The Vise	Series 5, Episodes 20 & 32: Six Months to Talk / Black Pawn, White Pawn	Marshall / P. C. Price	NBC	Exists
1958	The Vise	Series 6, Episode 6: Background for Murder	Policeman	NBC	Exists
1958	Black Furrow	TV Movie	Johnson	BBC Television Service	Missing
1958	Drake's Progress	Series 2, Episodes 2 & 3	Unknown	BBC Television Service	Missing
1958	Sword of Freedom	Series 1, Episode 8: Caterina	Major Domo	ITV (ITC)	Exists
1958	The Sky Larks	Episodes 2-3, 5 & 7	P.O. Bastin	BBC Television Service	Missing
1958	African Patrol	Series 1, Episodes 15 & 25: Tycoon / Black Ivory	Brad / Collins	ITV	Exists
1958	The Adventures of William Tell	Episodes 3, 5 & 11: Secret Death / The Prisoner / The Cuckoo	Schmidt / blacksmith / armourer (ep. 5 & 11 uncredited)	ITV (ITC)	Exists
1958	The Invisible Man	Series 1, Episode 5: Picnic With Death	Lord Brookesley (uncredited)	ITV (ITC)	Exists
1959	Dixon of Dock Green	Series 5, Episode 22: A Case for the Inland Revenue	1st carter	BBC Television Service	Missing
1959	The Vise	Series 6, Episode 17: Platinum Murder	Mr. Peters	NBC	Exists
1959	The Vise	Series 7, Episodes 1 & 8: Under Suspicion / Dead Before Arrival	Jim / Warehouseman	NBC	Exists
1959	Murder Bag	Episode: Lockhart Makes a Tally	Unknown	ITV (Rediffusion)	Missing
1959	Charlie Drake	Series 2, Episode 1: Charlie and the King of Siam	Unknown	BBC Television Service	Exists
1959	Charlesworth	Episode 14: Open and Shut	Det. Sgt. Bates	BBC Television Service	Missing
1959	Charlie Drake	Series 3, Episode 3: An Affair of the Heart	Ship's captain	BBC Television Service	Missing
1959	Interpol Calling	Episode 13: Slave Ship	Commander Siddons	ITV	Exists
1960	International Detective	Series 1, Episodes 4 & 23: The Cumberland Case / The Santino Case	Albert Naseby / Murato	ITV	Exists
1960	Interpol Calling	Episode 24: Finger of Guilt	Dutch policeman (uncredited)	ITV	Exists
1960	Man from Interpol	Episode 8: Love by Extortion	Sergeant	NBC	Exists
1960	The Vise	Series 7, Episodes 22 & 25: Scream in the Night / Lost and Found	First detective / Mansfield	NBC	Exists
1960	The Strange World of Gurney Slade	Episode 3	Farm human	ITV (ATV)	Exists
1960	Knight Errant Limited	Episode 11: The Conspirators	Dr. O'Kelly	ITV (Granada)	Missing
1960	The Charlie Drake Show	Series 1, Episodes 2 & 5: The Man Who Could Dream Winners / A Christmas Carol	Unknown / Bill Sikes	BBC Television	Missing
1961	A Life of Bliss	Series 2, Episode 5	Policeman	BBC Television	Missing
1961	The Charlie Drake Show	Series 2, Episode 3: The Man Who Blew Himself Up	Unknown	BBC Television	Missing
1961	Golden Girl	Series 2, Episode 4: The Man in the Park	Norman Tilsley	BBC Television	Missing
1961	Rendezvous	Series 1, Episode 29: The Executioner	Goddard	ITV (Rediffusion)	Exists
1961	Sir Francis Drake	19 episodes	Richard Grenville	ITV (ITC)	Exists
1962	Sir Francis Drake	19 episodes	Richard Grenville	ITV (ITC)	Exists
1962	The Cheaters	Series 2, Episode 18: The Dashing Major	Willie	ITV (ABC)	Exists
1962	Dixon of Dock Green	Series 9, Episode 13: Cash and Carry	Paul Bennett	BBC Television Service	Missing
1963	Richard the Lionheart	Episode 28: Capture	First shepherd	ITV	Exists
1963	Sergeant Cork	Series 1, Episode 1: Case of the Reluctant Widow	Drayman	ITV (ATV)	Exists
1963	Doctor Who	Series 1: An Uneartly Child (3 episodes)	Horg	BBC Television Service	Exists
1964	Espionage	Episode 19: Snow on Mount Kama	Ted Newcombe	ITV (ATV)	Exists
1964	HMS Paradise	Episode 3: An Officer and a Gentleman	Commander Bell	ITV (Rediffusion)	Missing
1964	The Saint	Series 3, Episode 1: The Miracle Tea Party	Security guard (uncredited)	ITV (ITC)	Exists
1964	Z-Cars	Series 4, Episode 6: Somebody Said…	Brown	BBC One	Exists
1964	Merry-Go-Round	Series 3, Episodes 8-10	Self	BBC One	Missing
1964	Gideon's Way	Episode 6: The Lady-Killer	Sergeant Fowler	ITV (ITC)	Exists
1965	Theatre 625	Series 3, Episode 9: The World of George Orwell: Coming Up for Air	Grimmett	BBC Two	Missing
1965	Meet the Wife	Series 4, Episode 6: Journey Home	The countryman	BBC One	Exists
1966	The Wednesday Play	Series 4, Episode 10: A Walk in the Sea	Dart player	BBC One	Missing
1966	Softly, Softly	Series 1, Episode 19: The Short Cut	Dobson	BBC One	Missing
1966	King of the River	Episode 12: Flash Point	Captain Friar	BBC One	Missing
1967	Z-Cars	Series 6, Episode 66: A Handful of Dust Pt. 2	Insp. Jackson	BBC One	Missing
1967	Softly, Softly	Series 3, Episode 9: The Hunt	Mr. Forbes	BBC One	Exists
1968	Freewheelers	Series 1, Episodes 3-5	Vice Admiral Nash	ITV (Southern)	Exists
1968	The Saturday Special	Episode 8: Georgia Brown Sings Kurt Weill	Narrator	ITV	Exists
1969	W. Somerset Maugham	Episode 4: The Letter	Clark	BBC Two	Exists
1969	Softly, Softly	Series 5, Episode 5: Dead Aboard	Captain Donaldson	BBC One	Exists
1969	Detective	Series 3, Episode 7: Elimination Round	Packer	BBC One	Missing
1969	Who-Dun-It	Episode 13: A High Class Death	Swinnerton	ITV (ATV)	Exists
1969	Z-Cars	Series 6, Episodes 277-278: Quiet Day Pts. 1 & 2	Tice	BBC One	Missing
1970	The Six Wives of Henry VIII	Episode 3: Jane Seymour	Sir John Seymour	BBC Two	Exists
1970	Macbeth	Episode 5	Siward	ITV (Thames)	Exists
1970	Horizon	Series 17, Episode 15: The Gargantuan Triumph of Science	Mr. Rothery	BBC Two	Exists
1971	The Persuaders!	Series 1, Episode 6: The Time and Place	Coalition Club member (uncredited)	ITV (ITC)	Exists
1971-1980	The Onedin Line	8 series, 91 episodes	Captain Baines	BBC One	Exists
1972	It's Murder. But Is It Art?	Episodes 1-2 & 5	Chief Constable	BBC One	Missing
1974	Jackanory Playhouse	Episode: King Thrushbeard and the Proud Princess	King Geoffrey	BBC One	All programmes exist from this point
1976	The Basil Brush Show	Series 11, Episode 3	Titus Anute	BBC One	All programmes exist from this point
1983	The Winds of War	Episodes 3-6	Winston Churchill	ABC	All programmes exist from this point
1984	The Last Days of Pompeii	All 3 episodes	Medon	ABC	All programmes exist from this point
1984	Jane	Series 2, Episode 5	Winston Churchill	BBC Two	All programmes exist from this point
1985	The Pickwick Papers	Episodes 6, 9, 11-12	Tony Weller	BBC One	All programmes exist from this point
1986	The Pyrates	TV Movie	Captain Yardley	BBC Two	All programmes exist from this point
