= So Evil, So Young =

1961 film by Godfrey Grayson

- Original British poster
- Directed by: Godfrey Grayson
- Written by: Mark Grantham
- Produced by: Edward J. Danziger; Harry Lee Danziger
- Starring: Jill Ireland; Ellen Pollock; John Charlesworth; Jocelyn Britton
- Cinematography: James Wilson
- Edited by: Desmond Saunders
- Production company: Danziger Productions
- Distributed by: United Artists
- Release date: 1961
- Running time: 77 minutes
- Country: United Kingdom
- Language: English

So Evil, So Young is a 1961 British second feature ('B') Technicolor reform school prison film directed by Godfrey Grayson and starring Jill Ireland and Ellen Pollock. It was written by Mark Grantham and produced by The Danzigers.

== Synopsis ==
Lucy and Claire are at a house where Lucy used to work. The two of them hack into the safe behind a picture. Inside are several jewels. Claire warns Lucy to leave, but Lucy says that the home-owners are on vacation and the butler is the only one at home; however, he is at the back of house. She says that they have all the time in the world. However, a few seconds later the butler walks in on them. He sees Lucy and recognizes her, but does not see Claire; Claire whacks him on the head with something, knocking him out.

Lucy tells Claire to take the jewels and give her half when she gets out of prison, where she will undoubtedly go. She heads to a local club where she sees her ex-boyfriend Tom eyeing his new girlfriend Ann. Jealous and angry, she takes a necklace she kept in her jacket pocket, which she stole from the house, and puts it in Anne's jacket pocket, without anyone seeing.

The police come to Ann’s house and ask her if she knows of any stolen jewellery, for Lucy has told the police that she was her accomplice. Ann denies this, but the police find the necklace in her coat pocket. She is sentenced to three years in Wilsham, a prison with no bars on the windows and they rely on your honour not to just walk out. They also do not like to call it a prison.

Everybody comes to hate the wardress of the girls, Miss Smith. Ann, as she was a secretary before coming to Wilsham, is told to help the Matron with her secretarial business, which Ann accepts willingly. Meanwhile, Lucy starts to pit all the girls against Ann, except for one, Mary, who has served four years in Wilsham and is getting out in one week.

The girls decide to have a party for Mary and when the wardress is gone, they have pie and celebrate. However the wardress hears the noise just before she leaves and goes to investigate. Oblivious with her eyes closed, Mary continues dancing around while the wardress is still in the room. The wardress tells her that she may have another 12 months in prison for this and then takes her away. In the morning when they go to work the girls find that Mary has hanged herself.

When questioned about if anything she could have said indirectly have caused Mary to hang herself, Miss Smith denies this.

The girls then start a riot led by Lucy and Jane. They hurt Miss Smith's arm and trash the kitchen. The only one that doesn't participate in the riot is Ann. All the girls are sentenced to a punishment except Ann. She asks the Matron if she can have the same punishment as the rest of the girls, and the Matron hesitantly complies.

Jane then talks to Ann and apologises for her actions towards her and tells Ann that she knows she’s innocent of the crime she was accused of committing. Jane tells Ann to talk to dear old Moran and leaves it at that.

Ann than climbs out the window after stealing the Matron’s coat, tells Tom to talk to dear old Moran and then turns herself in to the police. Her sentence is extended. Tom finds Moran, the owner of a pawn shop, who reveals that Claire pawned all the jewels and told him a false story. He checks the police record for stolen jewellery and finds all the pieces there. He calls the police who find Claire and bring her into the station. They also bring Lucy into the station who denies that Claire is her partner; however, when she finds out that Claire pawned all the jewels, she becomes outraged and has a fight with her, and then tells the police that Claire really was her accomplice.

Ann is released from prison.

== Cast ==
- Jill Ireland as Ann
- Ellen Pollock as Miss Smith
- John Charlesworth as Tom
- Jocelyn Britton as Lucy
- Joan Haythorne as Matron
- Olive McFarland as Jane
- John Longden as Turner
- Sheila Whittingham as Mary
- Natalie Lynn as Dormitory Wardress
- Colin Tapley as Inspector
- Gordon Boyd as Detective
- C. Denier Warren as Sam
- Bernice Swanson as Claire
- Annette Kerr as Workroom Wardress
- Anne Padwick as Dormitory Wardress
- Otto Diamant as Moran
- Alastair Hunter as Butler
- Gwendolyn Watts as Edna
- Constance Fecher as Cell Wardress

== Critical reception ==
The Monthly Film Bulletin wrote: "Loosely and in every way predictably carpentered Mädchen in Uniform melodrama, stiffly staged and tarted up with Technicolor. Joan Haythorne contributes a controlled performance as the matron, but Ellen Pollock is inclined to chew the scenery as the monstrous Miss Smith."

Kine Weekly wrote: "The picture leaves a few things unexplained, but its main action in the reformatory is both revealing and exciting. Jill Ireland wins much sympathy as Ann, Ellen Pollock has a field day as the vicious and vindictive Miss Smith, and Joan Haythorne contributes a perfectly controlled portrayal as the matron, but little is seen of John Charlesworth as Tom. The film, more than adequately staged and tarted up by Technicolor, should interest men, as well as women."

Richard Harland Smith wrote for TCM.com, "shameless recyclers of their own material, the Danzigers reshuffled elements of So Young So Bad (1950) (Paul Henreid as a progressive psychiatrist who attempts to rehabilitate youth offenders) with the "wrongly accused protagonist" plots of Sentenced for Life (1960) and Man Accused (1959) to create So Evil, So Young... derivative in concept, So Evil, So Young strived for novelty by being one of the Danziger's only films shot in Technicolor".

Sky Movies called the film "an offbeat movie drama which takes a grim look at a women's reformatory. Jill Ireland, now married to screen tough guy Charles Bronson, is both fetching and effective in the central role".

TV Guide wrote, "the cruelties of reform school are realistically exposed," adding, "this film has never been shown theatrically in the US, but it should be."

Chibnall and McFarlane wrote in The British 'B' Film: "whatever the script of the cautionary tale So Evil, So Young may have had going for it, woefully inept acting (apart from a cherishable display of eye-rolling sadism from Ellen Pollock as a reformatory wardress), characterless sets and silly insistent music sink it – a shame, because the screenplay makes unusual acknowledgement of female sexuality as an issue in the drama."
