= Thelma Connell =

English film editor

- Born: Thelma Balle Dunaway; 30 June 1912; London, England
- Died: 29 April 1976 (aged 63); Monaco
- Other name: Thelma Myers
- Occupations: Film editor, director

Thelma Connell (credited early in her career as Thelma Myers) was a film editor from England. She was known for her work on thrillers and mysteries, and she often collaborated with Frank Launder, Sidney Lumet, and Lewis Gilbert.

== Biography ==
Born in London, she began her career as a continuity girl, and then became an assistant editor working on films such as The Life and Death of Colonel Blimp (1943). Her first major film credit was in Noël Coward and David Lean's war film In Which We Serve (1942).

Connell's subsequent films included I See a Dark Stranger (1946), The Blue Lagoon (1949), and Alfie (1966); for the latter, she earned a nomination for the BAFTA Award for Best Editing the first year the award was introduced, making her the first woman ever nominated in that category. She was the original editor on the 1967 James Bond film You Only Live Twice, but she was replaced after the producers were unhappy with the running time of the film.

On television, she acted as producer on the ITC series The Adventures of Robin Hood. She also served as co-director on the 1954 film Tale of Three Women.

== Selected filmography ==
- Operation: Daybreak (1976)
- Paul and Michelle (1974)
- Maria Marusjka (1973)
- The Call of the Wild (1972)
- Endless Night (1972)
- See No Evil (1971)
- The Buttercup Chain (1970)
- The Virgin Soldiers (1969)
- The Appointment (1969)
- The Deadly Affair (1967)
- Island of Terror (1966)
- Alfie (1966)
- The Hill (1965)
- Dr. Terror's House of Horrors (1965)
- Shadow of Treason (1964)
- Hide and Seek (1964)
- The Barber of Stamford Hill (1962)
- Only Two Can Play (1962)
- The Night We Got the Bird (1961)
- Wee Geordie (1955)
- Tale of Three Women (1954)
- Star of My Night (1954)
- Folly to Be Wise (1952)
- Stranger on the Prowl (1952)
- Bikini Baby (1951)
- The Mudlark (1950)
- The Great Manhunt (1950)
- The Blue Lagoon (1949)
- Green for Danger (1946)
- I See a Dark Stranger (1946)
- Notorious Gentleman (1945)
- In Which We Serve (1942)
