= The Spanish Sword =

1962 British film by Ernest Morris

- Directed by: Ernest Morris
- Written by: Brian Clemens (story)
- Produced by: Edward J. Danziger; Harry Lee Danziger; Brian Taylor
- Cinematography: Walter J. Harvey (as Jimmy Harvey)
- Edited by: Peter Pitt
- Music by: Bill LeSage
- Production company: Danziger Productions
- Distributed by: United Artists Corporation (UK)
- Release date: January 1962 (UK)
- Running time: 62 minutes
- Country: United Kingdom
- Language: English

The Spanish Sword is a low budget 1962 British second feature ('B') adventure film directed by Ernest Morris and starring Ronald Howard, June Thorburn and Nigel Green. It was written by Brian Clemens and produced by The Danzigers.

A knight protects the treasure of Henry III of England from a thieving baron.

== Plot ==
Rebellion breaks out during the reign of Henry III, and a brave knight foils the plans of a baron to steal the treasure of the King.

== Cast ==
- Ronald Howard as Sir Richard Clovell
- June Thorburn as Lady Eleanor
- Nigel Green as Baron Breaute
- Trader Faulkner as Philip
- Derrick Sherwin as Edmund
- Robin Hunter as Thomas of Exeter
- Sheila Whittingham as Frances
- Barry Shawzin as Redbeard
- Garard Green as sergeant

== Production ==
It was the last film shot at New Elstree Studios, wrapping production on 4 December 1961.

== Critical reception ==
The Monthly Film Bulletin wrote: "Loyal knighthood-versus-treacherous tyranny in the reign of Henry III: unconvincing swordplay, tame characterisation and incident, direction without spark."

Kine Weekly wrote: "Although it lacks scope the film has a robust story and a rousing final scene. ... This subject is one which lends itself to spectacle, but is denied it here. What it really lacks is scope and punch and this half-hearted approach mitigates against conviction, but hearty and robust encounters and a rousing finale accompanied by moderate suspense will hold the not too critical audience. Ronald Howard is a rather anaemic knight as Clovell and the role of Eleanor makes few demands upon June Thorburn while Nigel Green is a little too emphatic as the bombastic Breaute. The country settings are pleasing and the costumes give a more or less accurate picture of the period to bolster up the far-fetched plot."

TV Guide wrote: "a weak script is saved by some impressive battle scenes and authentic-looking costuming."
