= Enter Inspector Duval =

1961 British film by Max Varnel

- Directed by: Max Varnel
- Screenplay by: J. Henry Piperno; Jacques Monteux
- Produced by: Bill Luckwell
- Starring: Anton Diffring; Diane Hart; Mark Singleton
- Cinematography: Stephen Dade
- Edited by: Oswald Hafenrichter
- Music by: Wilfred Burns
- Production company: Ardmore Studios
- Release date: 8 January 1961
- Running time: 64 minutes
- Country: United Kingdom
- Language: English

Enter Inspector Duval is a low budget 1961 British crime film directed by Max Varnel and starring Anton Diffring, Diane Hart and Mark Singleton. The screenplay was by J. Henry Piperno based on a story by Piperno and Jacques Monteux.

== Plot ==
French policeman Inspector Duval is brought to London to help his British colleagues crack a case. The investigation concerns the murder of a socialite during a jewel theft. However, it turns out Inspector Duval has ulterior motives.

== Cast ==
- Anton Diffring as Inspector Duval
- Diane Hart as Jackie
- Mark Singleton as Inspector Wilson
- Charles Mitchell as Brossier
- Aiden Grennell as Mark Sinclair
- Susan Hallinan as Doreen
- Charles Roberts as Charley
- Patrick Bedford as Sergeant Hastings
- James Fitzgerald as Mario

== Critical reception ==
Monthly Film Bulletin said "Apart from the opening burglary and murder and the final pursuit, this is a sluggish detective thriller. The development is static and wordy, while the twist ending is enough to make an addict of genuine crime fiction tear his hair. Direction and performance are barely adequate."

Leslie Halliwell said: "Dim mystery with no hope of becoming a series."
