= High Jump (film) =

1959 British film by Godfrey Grayson

- Directed by: Godfrey Grayson
- Written by: Brian Clemens; Eldon Howard
- Produced by: Edward J. Danziger; Harry Lee Danziger
- Starring: Richard Wyler; Lisa Daniely; Leigh Madison
- Cinematography: James Wilson
- Edited by: Lee Doig
- Production company: Danziger Productions
- Distributed by: United Artists (UK)
- Release date: 1959
- Running time: 66 minutes
- Country: United Kingdom
- Language: English

High Jump is a low budget 1959 British crime film directed by Godfrey Grayson and starring Richard Wyler and Lisa Daniely. It was written by Brian Clemens and Eldon Howard, and produced by The Danzigers.

== Plot ==
A former trapeze artist becomes involved in a jewel robbery.

== Cast ==
- Richard Wyler as Bill Ryan
- Lisa Daniely as Jackie
- Leigh Madison as Kitty
- Michael Peake as Ray Shaw
- Arnold Bell as Tom Rowton
- Nora Gordon as Mrs. Barlow
- Stuart Hillier as Tony
- Tony Doonan as Frank
- Robert Raglan as Inspector
- Colin Tapley as guard

== Critical reception ==
The Monthly Film Bulletin wrote: "An indifferently written and directed Danziger production along the usual lines, none too convincingly played, and marking the British debut, as Richard Wyler, of Hollywood actor Richard Stapley."

In British Sound Films: The Studio Years 1928–1959 David Quinlan rated the film as "mediocre", writing: "Uninteresting thriller."

TV Guide wrote, "blase attempt to create an exciting crime drama quickly loses much impact in the opening scenes...The addition of a sex angle did absolutely nothing to heighten interest."
