= Star of My Night =

1954 British film by Paul Dickson

- Directed by: Paul Dickson
- Written by: Paul Tabori
- Based on: Le Soleil de ma Nuit by Paul Tabori
- Produced by: Edward J. Danziger; Harry Lee Danziger
- Starring: Griffith Jones; Kathleen Byron; Hugh Williams
- Cinematography: Jack E. Cox
- Edited by: Thelma Connell
- Music by: Edwin Astley
- Production company: Kenilworth Film Productions
- Distributed by: General Film Distributors
- Release date: 1 March 1954
- Running time: 70 minutes
- Country: United Kingdom
- Language: English

Star of My Night is a 1954 British second feature ('B') romance film directed by Paul Dickson and starring Griffith Jones, Kathleen Byron and Hugh Williams. It was written by Paul Tabori from his 1957 novel Le Soleil de ma Nuit. It concerns a sculptor who becomes romantically involved with a ballerina. Although produced as a second feature by the Danziger Brothers, it had a more established cast than many.

== Premise ==
A jaded sculptor becomes romantically involved with a ballerina who gives him a fresh outlook on life.

== Critical reception ==
The Monthly Film Bulletin wrote: "A novelettish story which at least has the merit of being thorough – no cliché associated with the situation is omitted. Playing and direction do nothing to improve on the dismally banal material."

Kine Weekly wrote: "'Arty-crafty' romantic melodrama, unfolded in Bohemian circles. It covers the checkered love life of a talented, though cynical, sculptor who ultimately goes blind and a brilliant young ballerina, but cannot escape from its completely phoney environment. Cliché-ridden from start to finish, it'll exasperate the highbrows and bore the low. ... The picture, primarily a conversation piece, is far removed from reality, and the longer it goes on the more unconvincing it becomes. Griffith Jones does his best to put over the pretentious dialogue and look all 'Chelsea' but fails, as Michael, while Pauline Olsen, although pleasing to the eye, hardly suggests the intense or expert ballerina as Iris."

Picturegoer wrote: "Unfortunately, this film stumbles sadly across the line where drama becomes melodrama. ... but more imagination in the direction could have lifted it out of these depths of romantic gloom. Such a story needs characters larger than life. Here they are under-played and unconvincing. Griffith Jones (the artist), Pauline Olsen (the ballerina) and Kathleen Byron (the other woman) are pleasant and adequate, but they have to battle with a poor script that tries painfully hard to be clever."

In British Sound Films: The Studio Years 1928–1959 David Quinlan rated the film as "mediocre", writing: "Gloomy, artily written drama."

== Cast ==
- Griffith Jones as Michael Donovan
- Kathleen Byron as Eve Malone
- Hugh Williams as Arnold Whitman
- Pauline Olsen as Iris
- Harold Lang as Carl
- Ilona Ference as Daisy
- André Mikhelson as Papa Condor
- Kenneth Edwards as Doctor Dawson

== Bibliography ==
- Chibnall, Steve & McFarlane, Brian. The British 'B' Film. Palgrave MacMillan, 2009.
