= Crash Drive =

1959 British film by Max Varnel

- UK theatrical poster
- Directed by: Max Varnel
- Written by: Brian Clemens; Eldon Howard
- Produced by: Edward J. Danziger; Harry Lee Danziger
- Starring: Dermot Walsh; Wendy Williams
- Cinematography: James Wilson
- Edited by: Lee Doig
- Production company: Danziger Productions
- Distributed by: United Artists
- Release date: 1959
- Running time: 65 minutes
- Country: United Kingdom
- Language: English

Crash Drive is a 1959 British racing car film directed by Max Varnel and starring Dermot Walsh. It was produced by the Danziger Brothers. It was written by Brian Clemens and Eldon Howard and produced by The Danzigers.

== Plot ==
Paul Dixon is an international racing driver severely depressed after being paralysed from the waist down in a crash. He seems to have lost everything, including his will to live. His estranged wife Ann returns to him in the wake of the accident and attempts to cure him of his despair.

== Cast ==
- Dermot Walsh as Paul Dixon
- Wendy Williams as Ann Dixon
- Ian Fleming as Dr. Marshall
- Anton Rodgers as Tomson
- Grace Arnold as Mrs. Dixon
- Ann Sears as Nurse Phillips
- George Roderick as Manotti
- Garard Green as Forbes
- Geoffrey Hibbert as Henry
- Russell Cardon as boy pushing wheelchair
- Rolf Harris as Bart

== Critical reception ==
Kine Weekly wrote: "The picture has quite enough talk – its title is a bit misleading – and some rather naive by-play but, despite its shortcomings, clearly makes its point. Dermot Walsh occasionally overacts as the inhibited Paul, but Wendy Williams is a charming and understanding Ann, Grace Arnold scores as the strong-willed Mrs. Dixon, and lan Fleming cultivates the bedside manner as Doctor Marshall. Moreover, its ending is realistic, as well as happy."

In British Sound Films: The Studio Years 1928–1959 David Quinlan rated the film as "mediocre", writing: "Excellent plot very indifferently treated, maudlin and disappointing."

Sky Movies wrote, "this very minor, modest and mostly mediocre British melodrama – partly written by The Avengers producer Brian Clemens – has a hard job getting into gear."
