= Date at Midnight =

1959 British film by Godfrey Grayson

- Directed by: Godfrey Grayson
- Written by: Mark Grantham (original story)
- Produced by: Edward J. Danziger; Harry Lee Danziger
- Starring: Paul Carpenter; Jean Aubrey
- Cinematography: Jimmy Wilson
- Edited by: Desmond Saunders
- Music by: Tony Crombie
- Production companies: Danziger Productions Ltd; New Elstree Studios
- Distributed by: Paramount British Pictures (UK)
- Release date: 1959
- Country: United Kingdom
- Language: English

Date at Midnight is a 1959 British crime film directed by Godfrey Grayson and starring Paul Carpenter and Jean Aubrey. It was written by Brian Clemens and Eldon Howard and produced by The Danzigers.

== Preservation status ==
The British Film Institute National Archive holds a collection of stills but no film or video materials.

== Plot ==
American journalist Bob Dillon arrives in England and finds himself helping to solve a murder involving the nephew of a lawyer, who has been wrongly accused.

== Cast ==
- Paul Carpenter as Bob Dillon
- Jean Aubrey as Paula Burroughs
- Harriett Johns as Lady Leyton
- Ralph Michael as Sir Edward Leyton
- John Charlesworth as Tommy
- Philip Ray as Jenkins
- Howard Lang as Inspector
- Robert Ayres as Gordon Baines

== Critical reception ==
The Monthly Film Bulletin wrote: "Theatrical, confected and cliché-ridden, this pocket crime mystery has not even the benefit of acceptable performance and presentation."

Kine Weekly wrote: "The cast and director eagerly tackle the slightly confected script and neatly side-step cliches without disrupting continuity. Punchy and just right for size, it should satisfy audiences of both sexes. ... The picture unfolds smoothly and introduces a number of live red herrings before arriving at its somewhat theatrical, but nevertheless showmanlike, climax. Jean Aubrey is a cute Paula, Paul Carpenter registers as go-getter Bob, Harriette Johns exercises commendable restraint as the inhibited Lady Leyton, John Charlesworth invites sympathy as Tommy, and Ralph Michael is a dignified Sir Edward. Romance between Paula and Bob furnishes agreeable comedy relief, as well as feminine interest, its dialogue is crisp and the staging meets all demands."

TV Guide called it "Competent, though no more."
