= The Adventures of the Big Man =

- Starring: Wayne Morris
- Country of origin: United Kingdom
- Original language: English
- No. of seasons: 1
- No. of episodes: 16

Production
- Running time: 30 mins
- Production company: Trinity Films

Original release
- Release: 1956

The Adventures of the Big Man is a 1956 British television series starring Wayne Morris.

== Premise ==
A publicity man at a department store is also a detective.

== Cast ==
- Wayne Morris as Bill Pierce
- Robert Raglan as Inspector Wyatt
- George Street as Farnsworth
- John McLaren as Doctor
- Howard Lang as Balford
- Pamela Thomas as Sheila

== Reception ==
The Observer called it "weirdly unreal".
