= The Vise =

British detective drama TV series (1955–1957)

- Also known as: The Crooked Path; Tension; The Pendulum; The Vise: Mark Saber; Mark Saber; Uncovered; Saber of London; Saber of Scotland Yard; Detective's Diary
- Genre: Crime drama
- Written by: Mark Grantham, Brian Clemens
- Starring: Donald Gray
- Music by: Edwin Astley; Albert Elms
- Country of origin: United Kingdom
- Original language: English
- No. of seasons: 7
- No. of episodes: 221

Production
- Producer: Danziger Productions Ltd.
- Running time: 30 minutes

Original release
- Network: ABC
- Release: September 1955 – 1957
- Network: NBC
- Release: 1957 – May 15, 1960

Related
- Mystery Theater

The Vise (later known as Saber of London, also known as Mark Saber) is a British detective TV drama series starring Donald Gray as Mark Saber. It was produced by the Danzigers and broadcast on ABC (1955–1957) and then moved to NBC (1957–1960). The series is a reboot of the ABC Mystery Theater radio and television series. It mostly ran during prime time in the late 1950s.

== Background ==
ABC had originally broadcast a radio and television series called ABC Mystery Theater from 1951 to 1954. In the television series, Mark Saber was played by Tom Conway, a British detective working in an American homicide department, with James Burke as his assistant, Tim Maloney.

The series ended in June 1954. The sponsor, Sterling Drug, had shown repeats of Inspector Mark Saber the previous year and had kept the Friday 9:30 p.m. slot on ABC-TV for the fall, so a new series was needed.

The Danziger brothers began making the new series in England for Sterling Drug, to fill the Friday 9:30 p.m. slot on ABC-TV. It was originally called "Action", their second television series after Mayfair Mystery House, and was renamed The Vise in September 1954.

== Cast ==
Per listing in The Complete Directory to Prime Time Network and Cable TV Shows 1946–Present and Encyclopedia of Earth Television Crime Fighters:

- Donald Gray as Mark Saber
- Michael Balfour as Barney O'Keefe, Saber's assistant (1955–56)
- Teresa Thorne as Judy (1958)
- Diana Decker as Stephanie Ames, Saber's secretary and assistant (1956–57)
- Neil McCallum as Pete Paulson, Saber's assistant (1957–58)
- Gordon Tanner as Larry Nelson, Saber's assistant (1958)
- Robert Arden as Bob Page, Saber's assistant (1958–1960)
- Colin Tapley as Inspector Parker (1957–1960)

== Production ==
The series was produced by Edward J. and Harry Lee Danziger as a half-hour anthology. The first season, then called Action, was set up at M-G-M British Sudios in Borehamwood, with shooting to start August 16, 1954, with David MacDonald directing, on a further order of 26 telefilms for Sterling Drug. The first 12 episodes were finished by September 22, 1954, and the majority of season 1 was made at M-G-M British.

The second season continued as an anthology but was made at other studios as the Danzigers rented space around London. "Death Walks by Night" was made at Brighton Studios, and in March 1955 the trade noted "Newcomers to Pinewood Studios are the Danziger Brothers who are making a series of 20 minute shorts." "Bond of Hate" (production 45) was made at Twickenham Studios in April 1955.

In 1955, coinciding with the construction of their own studio, the Danzigers changed the format of The Vise from an anthology series to a standard format mystery series completely dedicated to the Mark Saber stories. They rebooted the Mark Saber drama and television series that was running on ABC in the US. Saber, portrayed by Donald Gray, was now a one-armed private detective in London and would be solving mysteries occurring in the UK as well as in Paris and the Riviera. Instead of Maloney, Saber had various assistants. Gray himself was also an amputee.

Screenplays were written by Mark Grantham, Brian Clemens, and others. Episodes were formatted for the half-hour time slot, with two episodes shot every five days. In an interview with Wheeler Winston Dixon, Clemens said that in the four years he wrote for the show, he only went on set with the Danzigers about eight times. The budgets for the episodes were about £17,000 for a feature, and shooting took about 8–10 days. Donald Gray told the press in 1957: "We turn out each film in 2½ days. Sometimes, we're so pressed for time, we film the rehearsals."

The Danzigers moved on to another series while still in production on Saber of London. In late 1958 they were filming Caesar Smith—Interpol Agent with a batch of 39 reported in January 1959. The February 1959 second feature The Great Van Robbery, with Denis Shaw as "Caesar Smith, an Interpol detective from Scotland Yard," served as pilot, before the project was expanded as The Man from Interpol with Richard Wyler in mid-1959. The series was also bought by Sterling Drug and ran on NBC, Saturdays at 10:30 p.m., from January 30, 1960.

== British quota registration ==
Like the Danziger's Calling Scotland Yard / Adventure Theater, The Vise, an anthology produced for US television, episodes were registered with the Board of Trade as British quota films and released theatrically in the UK as supporting shorts and as two-part and three-part compilation features.

Title	Board of Trade registration	Length	Compilation	Registered by / Made by
The Yellow Robe	31 Jan 1955	4555 ft	The Yellow Robe + Set a Murderer	Associated British-Pathe Ltd. / Danziger Productions Ltd.
The Final Column	2 Mar 1955	4562 ft	The Final Column + Dr. Damon's Experiment	Associated British-Pathe Ltd. / Danziger Productions Ltd.
Three Cornered Fate	4 Mar 1955	6822 ft	The Cruel Test + The Fair and the Fallen + Death on the Boards	Paramount Film Services Ltd. / Danziger Productions Ltd.
The Eavesdroppers	12 Mar 1955	2318 ft	single	Paramount Film Services Ltd. / Danziger Productions Ltd.
The Benevolent Burglar	12 Mar 1955	2367 ft	single	Paramount Film Services Ltd. / Danziger Productions Ltd.
Dress Rehearsal	15 Mar 1955	2287 ft	single	Paramount Film Services Ltd. / Danziger Productions Ltd.
Triple Blackmail	15 Mar 1955	6813 ft	Behind the Mask + The Deception + Broken Honeymoon	Paramount Film Services Ltd. / Danziger Productions Ltd.
The Gamblers	19 Mar 1955	2337 ft	single	Paramount Film Services Ltd. / Danziger Productions Ltd.
The Secret Place	19 Mar 1955	2335 ft	single	Paramount Film Services Ltd. / Danziger Productions Ltd.
The Eighth Window	19 Mar 1955	2296 ft	single	Paramount Film Services Ltd. / Danziger Productions Ltd.
Let Murder Be Done	25 Mar 1955	2414 ft	single	United Artists Corp. Ltd. / Danziger Productions Ltd.
The Corpse in Room 13	15 Mar 1955	2264 ft	single	Renown Pictures Corp. Ltd. / Danziger Productions Ltd.
The Lucky Man	15 Mar 1955	2414 ft	single	Renown Pictures Corp. Ltd. / Danziger Productions Ltd.
Price of Greed	31 Mar 1955	6363 ft	The Rattan Trunk + The Serpent Beneath + The Better Chance	United Artists Corp. Ltd. / Danziger Productions Ltd.
Diamond Expert	31 Mar 1955	4438 ft	Gabriel's Choice + The Diamond Expert	United Artists Corp. Ltd. / Danziger Productions Ltd.
Man in Demand	31 Mar 1955	4394 ft	Man in Demand + Price of Vanity	United Artists Corp. Ltd. / Danziger Productions Ltd.
The Homing Chinaman	31 Mar 1955	2265 ft	single	United Artists Corp. Ltd. / Danziger Productions Ltd.
Double Pay Off	31 Mar 1955	2141 ft	single	United Artists Corp. Ltd. / Danziger Productions Ltd.
Death Walks by Night	31 Mar 1955	2272 ft	single	Republic Pictures International Inc. (Gt. Britain) / Danziger Productions Ltd.
The Very Silent Traveller	31 Mar 1955	2343 ft	single	Republic Pictures International Inc. (Gt. Britain) / Danziger Productions Ltd.
Stranglehold	31 Mar 1955	2252 ft	single	Republic Pictures International Inc. (Gt. Britain) / Danziger Productions Ltd.
Murder of a Ham	31 Mar 1955	2221 ft	single	Republic Pictures International Inc. (Gt. Britain) / Danziger Productions Ltd.
Diplomatic Error	31 Mar 1955	2307 ft	single	Republic Pictures International Inc. (Gt. Britain) / Danziger Productions Ltd.
Count of Twelve	1 Apr 1955	4583 ft	Count of Twelve + Blind Man's Bluff	Associated British-Pathe Ltd. / Danziger Productions Ltd.
One Just Man	1 Apr 1955	4551 ft	One Just Man + Death Pays no Dividends	Associated British-Pathe Ltd. / Danziger Productions Ltd.
The Week-End Guest	1 Apr 1955	2284 ft	single	Associated British-Pathe Ltd. / Danziger Productions Ltd.
The Imperfect Gentleman	1 Apr 1955	2275 ft	single	Associated British-Pathe Ltd. / Danziger Productions Ltd.
Account Closed	1 Apr 1955	2275 ft	single	Associated British-Pathe Ltd. / Danziger Productions Ltd.
Fame and the Fury	1 Apr 1955	2265 ft	single	Associated British-Pathe Ltd. / Danziger Productions Ltd.
The Schemer	1 Apr 1955	2241 ft	single	Associated British-Pathe Ltd. / Danziger Productions Ltd.
Ring of Greed	1 Apr 1955	2204 ft	single	Associated British-Pathe Ltd. / Danziger Productions Ltd.

== United Kingdom television ==
In the United Kingdom the 61 episodes of the first two seasons of The Vise, were syndicated under two titles, The Crooked Path and Tension.

=== The Crooked Path ===
26 episodes were shown on British television as The Crooked Path. These comprised most of season 2, excluding The Corpse in Room 13, which had been sold to Renown Pictures for theatrical release, and Dead Man's Evidence, which has not been traced in British newspaper listings. All five theatrical releases purchased by Republic Pictures were included, including The Very Silent Traveler and Murder of a Ham from season 1.

=== Tension ===
35 episodes were shown as Tension. comprising 34 episodes from season 1 and The Corpse in Room 13 from season 2.

Four episodes have not been traced in British newspaper listings under either title – The Eavesdropper, The Yellow Robe and Account Closed from season 1, and Dead Man's Evidence from season 2.

=== Mark Saber ===
Seasons 4 and 3 were screened in the United Kingdom as Mark Saber, Season 4 first, in June 1957, followed by Season 3.

=== Saber of London ===
The Saber of London episodes, seasons 5 -7, were broadcast under that title.

== United States Broadcast ==
For the U.S. 1955-56 television season, The Vise aired on ABC at 9:30 p.m. EST on Fridays. It also aired at the same time for the 1956–57 season.

In 1957, the show was moved to NBC and retitled Saber of London, when it aired at 7:30 p.m. EST on Fridays. In the 1957–58 season, it competed against Leave It to Beaver on CBS and The Adventures of Rin Tin Tin on ABC. The Vise was also shown as The Vise: Mark Saber on ITV companies in Europe.

In the 1958–1959 season, Saber of London switched to 7 p.m. Sundays, opposite CBS's Lassie. In its last year, 1959–1960, it was moved a half-hour earlier just outside prime time to 6:30 p.m EST on Sundays, just outside prime time.

In syndication as Detective's Diary on NBC Saturdays at 12:30pm, reruns of Saber of London ended 7 January 1961 and were replaced by reruns of Man from Interpol from 14 January 1961.

== Series overview ==
Season	Episodes	Originally released	
Season	Episodes	First released	Last released
1	39	October 10, 1954	June 24, 1955
2	26	July 1, 1955	December 30, 1955
3	26	December 23, 1955	June 22, 1956
4	39	September 28, 1956	June 21, 1957
5	39	September 13, 1957	June 29, 1958
6	26	October 19, 1958	May 3, 1959
7	26	October 11, 1959	May 15, 1960

== Episodes ==
=== Season 1 (1954–55) made as The Vise ===
Season 1 was made and first broadcast as The Vise. It was an anthology series presented by Australian actor Ron Randell on ABC, Fridays 9:30 p.m. The series was a 30-minute made-in-Britain thriller filmed in England by the Danzigers.

Each episode opened with Randell emerging from the shadows of an alleyway at night to address the camera: "How do you do, the story we are going to tell is about people caught in the jaws of a vise, in a dilemma of their own making. We will start this story in a moment." Randall would return after the sponsor break with an introduction scripted for the episode.

No. overall	No. in season	Title	Directed by	Written by	Original release date
1	1	"One Just Man"	David MacDonald	Kate Barley, James Eastwood	1 October 1954
2	2	"Set a Murderer"	David MacDonald	James Eastwood	8 October 1954
3	3	"Let Murder Be Done"	David MacDonald	Unknown	16 October 1954
4	4	"Dr. Damon's Experiment"	David MacDonald	Paul Tabori	22 October 1954
5	5	"Death Pays No Dividends"	David MacDonald	Kate Barley, James Eastwood	29 October 1954
6	6	"Gabriel's Choice"	David MacDonald	Kate Barley, Paul Tabori	5 November 1954
7	7	"The Diamond Expert"	David MacDonald	Paul Tabori	12 November 1954
8	8	"The Secret Place"	David MacDonald	Unknown	20 November 1954
9	9	"The Fair and the Fallen"	David MacDonald	Kate Barley, James Eastwood	26 November 1954
10	10	"The Eavesdropper"	David MacDonald	Unknown	3 December 1954
11	11	"The Very Silent Traveler"	David MacDonald	Paul Tabori	10 December 1954
12	12	"The Yellow Robe"	David MacDonald	George St. George	17 December 1954
13	13	"Lucky Man"	David MacDonald	Paul Tabori	24 December 1954
14	14	"The Gamblers"	David MacDonald	Kate Barley, Paul Tabori	31 December 1954
15	15	"Count of Twelve"	Paul Dickson	Rex Rienits	7 January 1955
16	16	"The Final Column"	David MacDonald	Kate Barley, James Eastwood	14 January 1955
17	17	"The Benevolent Burglar"	David MacDonald	Paul Tabori	21 January 1955
18	18	"Blind Man's Bluff"	Paul Dickson	Paul Tabori	28 January 1955
19	19	"The Eighth Window"	David MacDonald	George Tabori	4 February 1955
20	20	"Broken Honeymoon"	Paul Dickson	Elizabeth Berridge, Reginald Moon	11 February 1955
21	21	"Death on the Boards"	David MacDonald	Paul Tabori	18 February 1955
22	22	"Behind the Mask"	Paul Dickson	Kate Barley, James Eastwood	25 February 1955
23	23	"Dress Rehearsal"	David MacDonald	James Eastwood	4 March 1955
24	24	"Cruel Test"	David MacDonald	Paul Tabori	11 March 1955
25	25	"The Deception"	David MacDonald	Paul Tabori	18 March 1955
26	26	"Week-End Guest"	David MacDonald	Kate Barley, James Eastwood	25 March 1955
27	27	"The Fame and the Fury"	David MacDonald	Kate Barley, James Eastwood	1 April 1955
28	28	"Ring of Greed"	David MacDonald	Frank Atkinson, Mabel Constanduros	8 April 1955
29	29	"The Imperfect Gentlemen"	David MacDonald	James Eastwood	15 April 1955
30	30	"The Schemer"	David MacDonald	Kate Barley, James Eastwood	22 April 1955
31	31	"Double Pay-Off"	David MacDonald	Paul Tabori	29 April 1955
32	32	"Account Closed"	David MacDonald	Paul Tabori	6 May 1955
33	33	"The Serpent Beneath"	David MacDonald	Kate Barley	13 May 1955
34	34	"The Price of Vanity"	David MacDonald	Richard Wade, John Wiles	20 May 1955
35	35	"Man in Demand"	David MacDonald	E.C. Tubb	27 May 1955
36	36	"The Homing Chinaman"	David MacDonald	Paul Tabori	3 June 1955
37	37	"Rattan Trunk"	Francis Searle	Kate Barley, Paul Tabori	10 June 1955
38	38	"Murder of a Ham"	David MacDonald	Paul Tabori	17 June 1955
39	39	"The Better Chance"	David MacDonald	Paul Tabori	24 June 1955

=== Season 2 (1955–56) made as The Vise ===
The series was renewed, in the same format with Randell as host, by Sterling Drug for the 1955–56 season and broadcast again on ABC in the same Friday 9:30 p.m. slot.

No. overall	No. in season	Title	Directed by	Written by	Original release date
40	1	"Diplomatic Error"	David MacDonald	Stanley Miller	1 July 1955
41	2	"Strangle Hold"	Ernest Morris	Unknown	8 July 1955
42	3	"The Corpse in Room Thirteen"	David MacDonald	John Roeburt	15 July 1955
43	4	"Death Walks by Night"	David MacDonald	Brian Clemens	22 July 1955
44	5	"The Verdict"	David MacDonald	John Roeburt	29 July 1955
45	6	"The Bargain"	David MacDonald	Unknown	5 August 1955
46	7	"Death in White"	David MacDonald	Stanley Miler	19 August 1955
47	8	"The Broken Link"	David MacDonald	Brian Clemens	26 August 1955
48	9	"Never Let Me Die"	David MacDonald	Brian Clemens	2 September 1955
49	10	"Bond of Hate"	David MacDonald	Robert Barr, Paul Tabori	9 September 1955
50	11	"The Death Mask"	Ernest Morris	Robert Hirst	16 September 1955
51	12	"Side Entrance"	David MacDonald	Gid Howe	23 September 1955
52	13	"The Search for Martha Harris"	Ernest Morris	Elizabeth Berridge	30 September 1955
53	14	"Money to Burn"	David MacDonald	John Roeburt	7 October 1955
54	15	"Two of a Kind"	David MacDonald	Brian Clemens	14 October 1955
55	16	"Cross Channel"	Ernest Morris	James Eastwood	21 October 1955
56	17	"Death Takes No Holiday"	David MacDonald	James Eastwood	28 October 1955
57	18	"Dead Man's Evidence"	Ernest Morris	Kent Taylor	4 November 1955
58	19	"Stranger in Town"	David MacDonald	Unknown	11 November 1955
59	20	"By Persons Unknown"	Ernest Morris	Unknown	18 November 1955
60	21	"Killer at Large"	Ernest Morris	John Roeburt	25 November 1955
61	22	"Wrong Time Murder"	Ernest Morris	Unknown	2 December 1955
62	23	"Gift from Heaven"	Ernest Morris	Ken Taylor	9 December 1955
63	24	"Second Sight"	Ernest Morris	Unknown	16 December 1955
64	25	"Good Name Murder"	Ernest Morris	George Mikes	23 December 1955
65	26	"Snapshot"	Ernest Morris	Unknown	30 December 1955

Title animation for The Pendulum

For its second-run syndication in the United States, The Vise was retitled The Pendulum. Under a barter arrangement reported in August 1955, sponsor Sterling Drug distributed the series to stations in exchange for spot availabilities rather than cash, the same type of deal previously used to place Inspector Mark Saber in over 100 markets. Distribution was handled by the Thompson-Koch agency. The network version introduced by Ron Randall had that footage removed for the reruns and new introductions with John Bentley inserted. While The Vise was still running on ABC-TV Friday 9:30-10 p.m., The Pendulum had already been picked up by 40 stations.

Episodes of The Pendulum were introduced by John Bentley with a pendulum clock swinging in the background: "The pendulum swings and destiny weaves a pattern. This is the story of people who tried to change that pattern, and found they could not stop the pendulum." After the break, Bentley would continue with an episode-specific introduction.

=== Season 3 (1955-56) made as The Vise ===
In May 1955 Broadcasting reported that Sterling Drug had renewed The Vise, Fridays, 9:30-10:30 p.m. on ABC-TV.

Although Season 3 was made and first broadcast as The Vise, the format was changed, coinciding with the move to the Danziger's New Elstree Studios. After more than a year seeking a detective hero, the producers introduced Mark Saber, a dashing, gray-at-the-temples ex-police inspector who solves crimes Scotland Yard is unable to handle.

The series now starred Donald Gray as Saber, with Michael Balfour as Barney O'Keefe and Teresa Thorne as his "girl Friday".

Although missing from many surviving prints, each episode began with the same introduction from Gray, as Saber: "How do you do. The story we are going to tell is about people caught in the jaws of a vise. We will begin our story in a moment." Each episode finished with Saber saying, "See you again to tell you another story of those who are caught in the jaws of a vise."

No. overall	No. in season	Title	Directed by	Written by	Original release date
66	1	"A Lady Is Missing"	Ernest Morris	Brian Clemens	23 December 1955
67	2	"Diamond Cut Diamond"	Ernest Morris	Brian Clemens	30 December 1955
68	3	"The Night Has Secrets"	Ernest Morris	Brian Clemens	6 January 1956
69	4	"The Captive Brain"	Ernest Morris	John Roeburt	13 January 1956
70	5	"The Girl from Rome"	Ernest Morris	James Eastwood	20 January 1956
71	6	"Man Hunt"	Ernest Morris	Brian Clemens	27 January 1956
72	7	"The Big Snatch"	Ernest Morris	Brian Clemens	3 February 1956
73	8	"Walk Softly for Murder"	Ernest Morris	Gwen Davies	10 February 1956
74	9	"Death Has Three Faces"	Ernest Morris	Brian Clemens	17 February 1956
75	10	"The Sally Ankens Story"	Ernest Morris	Gwen Davies	24 February 1956
76	11	"No Reply from Room 17"	Ernest Morris	Kate Barley, James Eastwood	2 March 1956
77	12	"Collector's Item"	Ernest Morris	Ken Taylor	9 March 1956
78	13	"Hear No Evil"	Ernest Morris	Gwen Davies, Brian Clemens	16 March 1956
79	14	"Killer on the Prowl"	Splinter Deason	Brian Clemens	23 March 1956
80	15	"Shroud for a Lady"	Ernest Morris	John Roeburt	30 March 1956
81	16	"Murder by Design"	Ernest Morris	John Roeburt	6 April 1956
82	17	"Frame-up Without Gloves"	Ernest Morris	Gilbert Winfield	13 April 1956
83	18	"The Tall Dark Man"	Ernest Morris	Kate Barley, James Eastwood	20 April 1956
84	19	"Vanishing Witness"	Ernest Morris	Brian Clemens	6 February 1959
85	20	"A Coffin for Johnny"	Ernest Morris	Brian Clemens	27 April 1956
86	21	"Deadline for Murder"	Ernest Morris	Gwen Davies	18 May 1956
87	22	"Find a Body"	Ernest Morris	John Roeburt	25 May 1956
88	23	"Murder for Gain"	Ernest Morris	Brian Clemens	1 June 1956
89	24	"There's Danger in Beauty"	Ernest Morris	Gilbert Winfield	8 June 1956
90	25	"Blood in the Sky"	Ernest Morris	Brian Clemens	15 June 1956
91	26	"Death Needs No Cane"	Splinters Deason	Gilbert Winfield	22 June 1956

=== Season 4 (1956-57) Made as The Vise ===
Renewed for a third year on ABC-TV (Fridays, 9:30 p.m. EDT) for Sterling Drug, with Diana Decker taking over as assistant Stevie Ames.

No. overall	No. in season	Title	Directed by	Written by	Original release date
92	1	"File It Under Murder"	Ernest Morris	Ken Field	28 September 1956
93	2	"If This Be Murder"	Ernest Morris	Ken Field	5 October 1956
94	3	"Safe for Murder"	Charles Eldridge	Brian Clemens	12 October 1956
95	4	"Sing Softly, Sister"	Ernest Morris	Ken Field	19 October 1956
96	5	"Holiday for Heatherton"	Ernest Morris	Ken Field	26 October 1956
97	6	"Receipt for Murder"	Kieron Moore	Gilbert Winfield	2 November 1956
98	7	"Kill Me, My Love"	Kieron Moore	Ken Field	9 November 1956
99	8	"A Cage of Fear"	Ernest Morris	Brian Clemens	16 November 1956
100	9	"Dram of Death"	Charles Eldridge	Ken Field	23 November 1956
101	10	"Cry Wolf"	Charles Eldridge	Brian Clemens	30 November 1956
102	11	"A Return to Danger"	Ernest Morris	Brian Clemens	7 December 1956
103	12	"The Very Last Witness"	Ernest Morris	Brian Clemens	14 December 1956
104	13	"A Hatful of Trouble"	Ernest Morris	Carol Warner Gluck	21 December 1956
105	14	"Corpse in the Cellar"	Charles Eldridge	Brian Clemens	28 December 1956
106	15	"The Wrong Face"	Charles Eldridge	Brian Clemens	4 January 1957
107	16	"Corpse with a Sword"	Charles Eldridge	Brian Clemens	11 January 1957
108	17	"Tough Part"	Ernest Morris	Gilbert Winfield	18 January 1957
109	18	"The Root of Evil"	Ernest Morris	Gilbert Winfield	25 January 1957
110	19	"Short Cut to Murder"	Ernest Morris	Kate Barley	1 February 1957
111	20	"Find Harry Clay"	Ernest Morris	Brian Clemens	8 February 1957
112	21	"Signature for Murder"	Charles Eldridge	Gilbert Winfield	15 February 1957
113	22	"Man on a Cliff"	Ernest Morris	Franklin Burton	22 February 1957
114	23	"Murder by Error"	Ernest Morris	John Roeburt	1 March 1957
115	24	"Back Track to Murder"	Ernest Morris	Brian Clemens	8 March 1957
116	25	"Death Wears a Coronet"	Harry Lee Danziger	George Lowther	15 March 1957
117	26	"The Sound of Death"	Charles Eldridge	Franklin Burton	22 March 1957
118	27	"Diamond Jubilee"	Kieron Moore	Gilbert Winfield	29 March 1957
119	28	"A Coin's Worth of Murder"	Harry Lee Danziger	Brian Clemens	5 April 1957
120	29	"The Hostage"	Richard Lester	Charles W. Peck Jr.	12 April 1957
121	30	"Farewell to Mrs. Forrest"	Harry Lee Danziger	Albert G. Miller	19 April 1957
122	31	"Bullets for Saber"	Ernest Morris	Brian Clemens	26 April 1957
123	32	"Death in a Flask"	Richard Lester	Stanley Miller	3 May 1957
124	33	"Against the Ropes"	Ernest Morris	Gilbert Winfield	10 May 1957
125	34	"Hi-Jacked"	Richard Lester	Albert G. Miller	17 May 1957
126	35	"The Pink Scarf"	Ernest Morris	Brian Clemens	24 May 1957
127	36	"Bishops Sometimes Bite"	Ernest Morris	Brian Clemens	31 May 1957
128	37	"Short, Dark and Handsome"	Ernest Morris	Brian Clemens	7 June 1957
129	38	"The Sucker Game"	Richard Lester	John Roeburt	14 June 1957
130	39	"You Only Live Twice"	Richard Lester	Ken Fields	21 June 1957

==== Syndication ====

39 episodes produced as The Vise for Seasons 3 and 4, were repackaged by Thompson-Koch from May 1956 for station syndication as Uncovered – described as reruns of the 39 films in The Vise on ABC-TV Friday 9:30-10 p.m. that season. The series used a new introduction with Donald Gray as Saber for all the episodes: "Covering crime is a reporter's business. Covering up crime is bad business. Uncovering crime is my business... I'm Mark Saber, private investigator. Stick around." Saber's epilogue in the end-credit sequence was "Well, case closed. I'll uncover another crime when we meet again on Uncovered".

=== Season 5 (1957-58) Made as Saber of London ===

In May 1957 sponsor Sterling Drug was reported to have been displaced from its longtime Friday ABC slot by the Frank Sinatra Show and to have moved to NBC's Friday 7:30 slot for the fall with a new run of Inspector Mark Saber shows.

First-run on NBC as part of the network's expanded suspense-adventure schedule for Fall 1957 alongside Dragnet and The Thin Man.

After their network first-run as Saber of London, episodes entered the Saturday daytime rerun pool as Detective's Diary.

Saber was initially aided in his case by new assistant, Pete Paulson (Neil McCallum), who was replaced by Larry Nelson (Gordon Tanner) for the last 13. Each episode was introduced by Saber introducing himself with: "Good evening, I'm Mark Saber, and this is London".

No. overall	No. in season	Title	Directed by	Written by	Original release date
131	1	"The Captain and the Killers"	Ernest Morris	Brian Clemens	13 September 1957
132	2	"Hands Across the Sea"	Ernest Morris	Eldon Howard	20 September 1957
133	3	"Deep in the Heart of Chelsea"	Ernest Morris	Eldon Howard	27 September 1957
134	4	"Death by Delayed Payment"	Max Varnel	Brian Clemens	4 October 1957
135	5	"The Missing Hours"	Ernest Morris	Brian Clemens	11 October 1957
136	6	"The Penny Black"	Max Varnel	Kate Barley	18 October 1957
137	7	"Girls and Diamonds"	Ernest Morris	Eldon Howard	25 October 1957
138	8	"Murder Shall Speak"	Godfrey Grayson	George St. George	1 November 1957
139	9	"The Baby-Sitter"	Ernest Morris	Kate Barley	8 November 1957
140	10	"Hour of Decision"	Max Varnel	John Roeburt	15 November 1957
141	11	"Luger for Chesser"	Godfrey Grayson	Brian Clemens	22 November 1957
142	12	"The Law and the Lawless"	David MacDonald	George St. George	29 November 1957
143	13	"Hidden Money"	Max Varnel	Eldon Howard	6 December 1957
144	14	"Fast Cars and Girls"	Ernest Morris	Eldon Howard	22 December 1957
145	15	"Strong Man Out"	Max Varnel	Stanley Miller	29 December 1957
146	16	"Saber's Bow and Arrow"	Max Varnel	Brian Clemens	5 January 1958
147	17	"Man About to Die"	Max Varnel	Brian Clemens	19 January 1958
148	18	"Saber at Sea"	Max Varnel	Brian Clemens	26 January 1958
149	19	"Cheating Cheaters"	Max Varnel	John Roeburt	2 February 1958
150	20	"6 Months to Talk"	Max Varnel	Eldon Howard	9 February 1958
151	21	"The Case of Mr. Shore"	Max Varnel	Eldon Howard	16 February 1958
152	22	"The Maid Was Curious"	Max Varnel	Eldon Howard	23 February 1958
153	23	"Four Against Three"	Max Varnel	Eldon Howard	2 March 1958
154	24	"Code to Murder"	Max Varnel	Eldon Howard	9 March 1958
155	25	"Calling Charlie - Emergency"	Max Varnel	Eldon Howard	23 March 1958
156	26	"The Visitor"	Max Varnel	James Eastwood	30 March 1958
157	27	"Field Goal"	Max Varnel	Eldon Howard	6 April 1958
158	28	"The Man Who Was Twice"	Max Varnel	Brian Clemens	13 April 1958
159	29	"Dead Man's Hands"	Max Varnel	Stanley Miller	20 April 1958
160	30	"Power of Suggestion"	Max Varnel	Eldon Howard	27 April 1958
161	31	"Diamond Follies"	Max Varnel	Eldon Howard	4 May 1958
162	32	"A Diplomatic Affair"	Max Varnel	Eldon Howard	11 May 1958
163	33	"Black Pawn, White Pawn"	David MacDonald	Kate Barley	18 May 1958
164	34	"Lillies for Lucas"	Max Varnel	Albert Miller	25 May 1958
165	35	"The White Cane"	Max Varnel	Eldon Howard	1 June 1958
166	36	"Beyond Fear"	Max Varnel	George St. George	8 June 1958
167	37	"Don't Lose Your Shirt"	Max Varnel	Eldon Howard	15 June 1958
168	38	"Weakness Doesn't Pay"	Max Varnel	Eldon Howard	22 June 1958
169	39	"The Corpse That Cried Murder"	Max Varnel	Brian Clemens	29 June 1958

=== Season 6 (1958–59) Made as Saber of London ===
Renewed for a second season under the Saber of London title, premiering Sunday, October 19, 1958, 7-7:30 p.m. EDT on NBC with "The Killer and the Kid," featuring Donald Gray as Mark Saber with Robert Arden as his assistant, Bob Page.

No. overall	No. in series	Title	Directed by	Written by	Original release date
170	1	"Death at His Fingertips"	Max Varnel	Brian Clemens	19 October 1958
171	2	"Paid Off"	Godfrey Grayson	Brian Clemens	26 October 1958
172	3	"Trap for Murder"	Godfrey Grayson	Brian Clemens	2 November 1958
173	4	"A Night on the Town"	Max Varnel	Gilbert Winfield	9 November 1958
174	5	"Background for Murder"	Max Varnel	Unknown	16 November 1958
175	6	"Where There's a Will"	Godfrey Grayson	Unknown	23 November 1958
176	7	"A Toast to Death"	Max Varnel	George St. George	30 November 1958
177	8	"It Walks at Night"	Godfrey Grayson	Eldon Howard	7 December 1958
178	9	"The Lady Doesn't Scare"	Godfrey Grayson	Brian Clemens	21 December 1958
179	10	"Uncle William"	Max Varnel	Patricia Hill	28 December 1958
180	11	"Curse of Death"	Godfrey Grayson	Brian Clemens	4 January 1959
181	12	"The Killer and the Kid"	Max Varnel	Brian Clemens	11 January 1959
182	13	"Hour of Reckoning"	Max Varnel	John Roeburt	25 January 1959
183	14	"Dilemma for Harry"	Godfrey Grayson	Eldon Howard	1 February 1959
184	15	"The Black Widow"	Godfrey Grayson	Brian Clemens	8 February 1959
185	16	"Dangerous Meeting"	Godfrey Grayson	Eldon Howard	15 February 1959
186	17	"Platinum Murder"	Godfrey Grayson	Eldon Howard	22 February 1959
187	18	"Operation Arson"	Max Varnel	Eldon Howard	1 March 1959
188	19	"Death Hides Out"	Max Varnel	Brian Clemens	8 March 1959
189	20	"Time Alibi for Murder"	Godfrey Grayson	John Roeburt	15 March 1959
190	21	"Murder for Revenge"	Unknown	Stanley Miller	22 March 1959
191	22	"Double Take"	Max Varnel	Stanley Miller	5 April 1959
192	23	"Cooked-Up Murder"	Max Varnel	Unknown	12 April 1959
193	24	"Dark Moments"	Max Varnel	Eldon Howard	19 April 1959
194	25	"Out of the Past"	Godfrey Grayson	Brian Clemens	26 April 1959
195	26	"Silent Accusation"	Godfrey Grayson	Stanley Miller	3 May 1959

=== Season 7 (1959–60) Made as Saber of London ===
Renewed for a third season under the Saber of London title for the 1959-60 season on NBC, sponsored by Sterling Drugs through Dancer-Fitzgerald-Sample, premiering Sunday, October 11, 1959, 6:30 p.m. on NBC with "Under Suspicion." Saber was assisted by Robert Arden as Bob Page and Jennifer Jayne as Anne.

No. overall	No. in series	Title	Directed by	Written by	Original release date
196	1	"Under Suspicion"	Max Varnel	Eldon Howard	11 October 1959
197	2	"Come Out Fighting"	Godfrey Grayson	Brian Clemens	18 October 1959
198	3	"The Opportunists"	Godfrey Grayson	Brian Clemens	25 October 1959
199	4	"Switch to Murder"	Godfrey Grayson	Stanley Miller	1 November 1959
200	5	"Silence for Sale"	Godfrey Grayson	Mark Grantham	8 November 1959
201	6	"One Thousand Alibis"	Godfrey Grayson	Mark Grantham	15 November 1959
202	7	"Jockey Missing"	Godfrey Grayson	Mark Grantham	22 November 1959
203	8	"Dead Before Arrival"	Godfrey Grayson	Mark Grantham	29 November 1959
204	9	"Fire!"	Godfrey Grayson	Gilbert Winfield	20 December 1959
205	10	"Arena for Fraud"	Godfrey Grayson	Eldon Howard	27 December 1959
206	11	"A Date with Trouble"	Unknown	Unknown	3 January 1960
207	12	"Incident in Soho"	Godfrey Grayson	Eldon Howard	10 January 1960
208	13	"Full Moon"	Godfrey Grayson	James Eastwood	24 January 1960
209	14	"The Florentine Madonna"	Godfrey Grayson	Stanley Miller	31 January 1960
210	15	"The Last Chapter"	Godfrey Grayson	Brian Clemens	7 February 1960
211	16	"Murder with Make-Up"	Godfrey Grayson	Brian Clemens	14 February 1960
212	17	"Broken Journey"	Godfrey Grayson	Brian Clemens	28 February 1960
213	18	"The Big Stone"	Godfrey Grayson	Kate Barley, James Eastwood	6 March 1960
214	19	"Ordeal of Fear"	Max Varnel	Brian Clemens	13 March 1960
215	20	"Damages"	Godfrey Grayson	Brian Clemens	27 March 1960
216	21	"Cousin from Montreal"	Godfrey Grayson	Mark Grantham	3 April 1960
217	22	"Scream in the Night"	Godfrey Grayson	George St. George	17 April 1960
218	23	"Kill and Run"	Godfrey Grayson	Brian Clemens	24 April 1960
219	24	"A Boxful of Tragedy"	Godfrey Grayson	Brian Clemens	1 May 1960
220	25	"Lost and Found"	Godfrey Grayson	Gilbert Winfield	8 May 1960
221	26	"Sweetheart, Beware!"	Godfrey Grayson	Brian Clemens	15 May 1960

== Archive status ==
Out of a total of 221 episodes, 22 are currently missing:

- Season 1 Episode 03 "Let Murder Be Done"
- Season 1 Episode 13 "Lucky Man"- One or more sequences exist, but the complete programme is lost.
- Season 1 Episode 29 "The Imperfect Gentleman" – One or more sequences exist, but the complete programme is lost.
- Season 1 Episode 30 "The Schemer"
- Season 2 Episode 11 "The Death Mask"
- Season 2 Episode 13 "The Search for Martha Harris" – Picture only exists – there is no sound.
- Season 2 Episode 21 "Killer at Large" – Picture only exists – there is no sound.
- Season 3 Episode 03 "The Night has Secrets"
- Season 3 Episode 09 "Death has Three Faces"
- Season 4 Episode 17 "Tough Part"
- Season 4 Episode 20 "Find Harry Clay"
- Season 4 Episode 24 "Back Track to Murder"
- Season 4 Episode 32 "Death in a Flask"
- Season 4 Episode 39 "You Only Live Twice"
- Season 5 Episode 02 "Hands Across the Sea"
- Season 5 Episode 34 "Lilies for Lucas"
- Season 6 Episode 03 "A Night on the Town"
- Season 6 Episode 16 "Dangerous Meeting"
- Season 6 Episode 23 "Cooked-Up Murder"
- Season 7 Episode 05 "Silence for Sale"
- Season 7 Episode 11 "A Date with Trouble"
- Season 7 Episode 15 "The Last Chapter"

On 14 May 2025 the Film Is Fabulous project announced the recovery of six episodes: "The Wrong Face, "The Bargain", "The Broken Link", A Toast to Death", "Arena for Fraud" and "The Yellow Robe".
