= Jean Aubrey =

British actress (1932–2008)

- Born: 8 February 1932; Burton upon Trent, Staffordshire, England
- Died: 26 July 2008 (aged 76); Kelso, Scotland
- Occupation: Actress

Jean Aubrey (8 February 1932 – 26 July 2008) was a British actress.

Jean Aubrey was born in Burton upon Trent, Staffordshire in 1932.

== Selected filmography ==
- Date at Midnight as Paula Burroughs (1959)
- Model for Murder as Annabelle Meadows (1959)
- Life in Emergency Ward 10 (1959)
- On the Fiddle as WAAF Corporal (1961)
- Man Detained (1961)
- On the Beat as Lady Hinchingford (1962)
- Do You Know This Voice? (1964) as Trudy

== Selected television ==
- The Saint Episode: The Crooked Ring. (1965)
- Theatre 625 (1967)
