= Mark Singleton (actor) =

British actor (1919–1986)

- Born: 2 March 1919; Thetford, Norfolk England
- Died: 24 July 1986 (aged 67); London, England
- Other name: Mark Frederick Singleton
- Occupation: Film actor
- Years active: 1952–1979

Mark Singleton (1919–1986) was a British film and television actor.

== Partial filmography ==
- The Gambler and the Lady (1952) - Waiter at Jack of Spades (uncredited)
- Girdle of Gold (1952) - Waiter
- Gilbert Harding Speaking of Murder (1953) - 2nd Drama critic
- Take a Powder (1953) - (uncredited)
- Face the Music (1954) - Waiter
- You Lucky People! (1955) - Lt. Arthur Robson
- Moment of Indiscretion (1958) - (Jeweller)
- Innocent Meeting (1959) - (uncredited)
- No Safety Ahead (1959) - Fordham
- Top Floor Girl (1959) - (uncredited)
- Bluebeard's Ten Honeymoons (1960) - Advertising Clerk (uncredited)
- Compelled (1960) - Derek
- Transatlantic (1960) - Mills
- Sentenced for Life (1960) - Edward Thompson
- A Taste of Money (1960) - Detective
- The Court Martial of Major Keller (1961) - Captain Fuller
- Murder in Eden (film) (1961) - Arnold Woolf
- Part-Time Wife (1961) - Detective
- Partners in Crime (1961) - Shilton
- Enter Inspector Duval (1961) - Inspector Wilson
- Operation Snatch (1962) - Prime Minister's Secretary
- Mrs. Gibbons' Boys (1962) - Relief PC
- The Traitors (1962) - Venner
- Night of the Prowler (1962) - Anders
- Gang War (1962) - Tony Danton
- Death Is a Woman (1966) - Costello, Head of the Police
- Salt and Pepper (1968) - 'Fake' Home Secretary
- Can You Keep It Up for a Week? (1974) - Mr. Hobson
- Keep It Up Downstairs (1976) - Lord Cockshute
- Game for Vultures (1979) - Sir Benjamin Peckover (final film role)
