= Gordon Boyd =

English actor (1922–2009)

- Born: Gordon William Needham; 26 December 1922; Sheerness, Isle of Sheppey, Kent, England
- Died: 8 October 2009 (aged 86); Wahroonga, Sydney, Australia
- Occupations: Actor; television presenter; singer
- Spouse(s): Joan Welldon (1950–74), Kate Boyd.

Gordon William Needham (26 December 1922 – 8 October 2009) credited as Gordon Boyd, was an English actor of film, television and musical theatre as well as a television host, and singer who hosted several television programmes in Australia during the 1960s. He worked in both his native Britain, and then in Australia after emigrating in 1964.

== Early life and military service ==
Boyd was born Gordon William Needham at Sheerness on the Isle of Sheppey, Kent, England. He attended Faversham Grammar School, and studied a year of medicine with the intention of becoming a medical missionary for the Methodist Church, but instead took up acting after joining the Royal Air Force in 1941, where he studied drama, performed and participated in radio broadcasts. After flight training in the United States, Boyd was posted to Ceylon, where he flew PBY Catalina flying boats and served with several Australian military personnel.

== Acting career ==
After the end of World War II, Boyd landed a role in the operetta Song of Norway, which ran for two years in London's West End. In 1953, he had a role in the West End production of Guys and Dolls, and in 1959 he played an Australian character in the poorly received play Kookaburra at the Prince's Theatre. In 1955, Boyd made his film debut in a minor role in Richard III, Laurence Olivier's adaptation of the Shakespeare play. Boyd also appeared in numerous British films and TV programs, including Hammer Films' The Revenge of Frankenstein, the medieval adventure series Ivanhoe, an episode of The Edgar Wallace Mystery Theatre (playing an Australian) and an early episode of The Avengers.

== Australian television ==
Boyd and his family—dancer Joan Welldon, and their two children—moved to Australia in 1963, where Boyd was to star in the musical Wildcat. When the production ended, Boyd remained in Australia where he went into television, hosting several variety and entertainment programmes in the mid-1960s including The Gordon Boyd Show (1964) on the ABC, and Showcase (a talent show on Channel 0-10, 1965–69), The Marriage Game (a dating game show, 1966–72), and Gordon and the Girls (a 1967 variety show) on Channel 10.

In later years, Boyd made several acting appearances on Australian drama series including A Country Practice in 1981 and 1984, and All Saints in 2002 and 2003.

== Selected filmography ==
- Marry Me (1949) as Jack Knighton
- Partners in Crime (1961) as Rex Holland
- So Evil, So Young (1961) as Detective
- Siege of the Saxons (1963) as Captain (uncredited)
