= Transatlantic (1960 film) =

British film by Ernest Morris

- Theatrical release poster
- Directed by: Ernest Morris
- Written by: Brian Clemens
- Produced by: Edward J. Danziger; Harry Lee Danziger
- Starring: June Thorburn; Pete Murray
- Release date: 21 August 1961
- Running time: 63 minutes
- Country: United Kingdom
- Language: English

Transatlantic is a 1960 British film directed by Ernest Morris and starring June Thorburn, Robert Ayres and Pete Murray. It was written by Brian Clemens and produced by The Danzigers. It was released on 21 August 1961.

== Plot ==
A gang of criminals steal jewels from a plane in mid-flight. They escape by parachute, having left a time-bomb on board which destroys the plane. The pilot is suspected of involvement, but his sister tracks down the gang and clears her late brother's name.

== Cast ==
- Pete Murray as Robert Stanton
- June Thorburn as Judy
- Bill Nagy as Fabroni
- Neil Hallett as Evans
- Jack Melford as Capt. Brady
- Sheldon Lawrence as Capt. Ives
- John G. Heller as Lucho
- Mark Singleton as Mills
- Robert Ayres as Hotchkiss
- Anthony Oliver as Wentworth
- Malou Pantera as Gina

== Critical reception ==
The Monthly Film Bulletin wrote: "Familiar crime-in-the-sky concoction; one or two faint tremors of tension, but for the most part elementary. Pete Murray gives a grotesque impersonation of an American law man."
