= The Danzigers =

American producers of 1950s British films/TV

Edward J. Danziger (1909–1999) and Harry Lee Danziger (1913–2005) were American-born brothers who produced many British films and TV shows in the 1950s and 1960s.

According to one profile "throughout the 1950s and early 1960s, their second features and TV series seemed to be on screens everywhere, their pervasive presence forming a part of virtually every British filmgoer's and television viewer's experience during those years."

== Career ==
Edward and Harry Danziger were native New Yorkers. Edward studied law and had worked on the Nuremberg Trials while brother Harry had a musical background. They operated a sound studio in New York that specialised in the dubbing of foreign films for US release. Their first feature film as producers was Jigsaw (1949).

In 1952, they moved to Britain and began making television films, using resources at various facilities including London's Riverside Studios, Shepperton, Borehamwood and Nettlefold. Among their first productions was the series Adventure Theater (aka, Calling Scotland Yard) which were shown on American television in 1956. Several episodes were compiled as supporting featurettes and released theatrically in the UK during 1954.

The screenwriter Brian Clemens worked for the Danzigers. He recalled that the Danzigers would shoot at a variety of British studios and order their writers to concoct a screenplay to use the standing sets. He stated they shot television episodes in two and a half to three days and shot a feature film in eight to ten days with a budget of £17,000.

In 1956, the Danzigers decided to form their own studio base and founded the New Elstree Studios in Hertfordshire. They converted a former wartime aero-engine testing factory into a studio with six sound stages and exterior shooting facilities.

They later acquired control of the Gordon Hotels Group and moved into the hotel business. They also owned the Shipman and King Cinema group. New Elstree Studios were sold in October 1965.

== Critical assessments ==
The British film historians Steve Chibnall and Brian McFarlane wrote: "The Danzigers were not in the business for art; they were in the business for business; and within those unpretentious parameters they ran an efficient studio from 1956 to 1962."

== Select credits ==
- Jigsaw (1949)
- So Young, So Bad (1950)
- St. Benny the Dip (1951)
- Babes in Bagdad (1952)
- Devil Girl From Mars (1954)
- Star of My Night (1954)
- The Final Twist (1954) – short
- The Javanese Dagger (1954) – short
- Present for a Bride (1954) – short
- "Diamond Expert" (1954) – from the TV series The Vise
- "One Just Man" (1954) – from the TV series The Vise
- "The Yellow Robe" (1954) – from the TV series The Vise
- Tale of Three Women (1954)
- Alias John Preston (1955)
- Count of Twelve (1955)
- Yellow Rose (1955)
- Three Cornered Fate (1955)
- Man in Demand (1955)
- Final Column (1955)
- Triple Blackmail (1955)
- Schemer (1956)
- Fun at the Movies (1956)
- Satellite in the Sky (1956)
- Three Crooked Men (1957)
- The Betrayal (1957)
- The Depraved (1957)
- Operation Murder (1957)
- Son of a Stranger (1957)
- Three Sundays to Live (1957)
- High Jump (1958)
- Innocent Meeting (1958)
- Links of Justice (1958)
- Moment of Indiscretion (1958)
- No Safety Ahead (1958)
- On the Run (1958)
- A Woman of Mystery (1958)
- The Great Van Robbery (1958)
- A Woman Possessed (1958)
- The Child and the Killer (1959)
- Crash Drive (1959)
- Date at Midnight (1959)
- Man Accused (1959)
- Top Floor Girl (1959)
- Web of Suspicion (1959)
- Date at Midnight (1959)
- Woman's Temptation (1959)
- Compelled (1960)
- Escort for Hire (1960)
- Feet of Clay (1960)
- Highway to Battle (1960)
- An Honourable Murder (1960)
- Identity Unknown (1960)
- Night Train for Inverness (1960)
- Operation Stogie (1960)
- Sentenced for Life (1960)
- The Spider's Web (1960)
- A Taste of Money (1960)
- The Tell-Tale Heart (1960)
- Transatlantic (1960)
- Two Wives at One Wedding (1960)
- The Gentle Terror (1961)
- Strip Tease Murder (1961)
- The Nudist Story (1961) aka For Members Only
- The Court Martial of Major Keller (1961)
- Fate Takes a Hand (1961)
- Middle Course (1961)
- Part-Time Wife (1961)
- Return of a Stranger (1961)
- So Evil, So Young (1961)
- Tarnished Heroes (1961)
- The Spanish Sword (1961)
- The Silent Invasion (1962)
- What Every Woman Wants (1962)
- She Always Gets Their Man (1962)

== TV series ==
- Calling Scotland Yard (1952) - two compilation features (each consisting of three episodes) were released to UK cinemas as Gilbert Harding Speaking of Murder (1953) and A Tale of Three Women (1954)
- The Vise (1954)
- The Vise: Mark Saber / Saber of London (1955–1960)
- The Man from Interpol (1960)
- The Cheaters (1960)
- Richard the Lionheart (1960)
