= The Gentle Terror =

1961 British film by Frank Marshall

- Directed by: Frank Marshall
- Written by: Mark Grantham
- Produced by: Edward J. Danziger; Harry Lee Danziger
- Starring: Terence Alexander; Angela Douglas
- Cinematography: Stephen Dade
- Edited by: John Dunsford
- Music by: Bill LeSage
- Release date: 1961
- Running time: 67 min.
- Country: United Kingdom
- Language: English

The Gentle Terror is a 1961 British second feature ('B') thriller film directed by Frank Marshall and starring Terence Alexander and Angela Douglas. It was written by Mark Grantham and produced by The Danzigers.

== Plot ==
A mild mannered bookkeeping clerk is accused of embezzlement. To clear his name he must catch the true culprit.

== Cast ==
- Terence Alexander as David
- Angela Douglas as Nancy
- Jill Hyem as Daphne
- Laidman Browne as Byrne
- Malcolm Webster as Ian
- Patrick McAlinney as Sam
- Victor Spinetti as Joe
- Peter Swanwick as 1st auditor
- Howard Greene as 2nd auditor
- Rosemary Rothery as Miss Durant
- John Hatton as Frank
- Paul Craig as Lou
- Fredric Abbott as barman
- Jack Melford as Inspector Miles
- Michael Beint as Det. Sgt. Harris
- George Mikell as Turk
- Michael Darbyshire as ticket clerk
- Totti Truman Taylor as Mrs. Connor

== Reception ==
The Monthly Film Bulletin wrote: "The story contains the bare bones of a promising farce, but feeble treatment, naive dialogue and weak acting result in a laboured and ineffective comedy, well below par by any standards."

Chibnall and McFarlane in The British 'B' Film called it a "feeble comedy-mystery."
