= Compelled =

1960 British film by Ramsey Herrington

- British theatrical poster
- Directed by: Ramsey Herrington
- Written by: Mark Grantham
- Produced by: Edward J. Danziger; Harry Lee Danziger
- Starring: Ronald Howard; Beth Rogan
- Cinematography: James Wilson (as Jimmy Wilson)
- Edited by: Desmond Saunders
- Production company: Danziger Productions
- Distributed by: United Artists Corporation (UK)
- Release date: December 1960 (UK)
- Running time: 56 minutes
- Country: United Kingdom
- Language: English

Compelled is a 1960 British second feature ('B') neo noir black and white crime film directed by Ramsey Herrington and starring Ronald Howard and Beth Rogan. It was written by Mark Grantham and produced by the Danziger Brothers.

== Plot ==
Ex-con Paul Adams is an engineer blackmailed into assisting with a jewel theft. Unknown to his wife, he becomes involved in the building of a tunnel from a bookshop to a jeweller's shop.

== Cast ==
- Ronald Howard as Paul Adams
- Beth Rogan as Carol
- John Gabriel as Fenton
- Richard Shaw as Jug
- Jack Melford as Grimes
- Mark Singleton as Derek
- Colin Tapley as Inspector
- Stella Bonheur as Mrs Mills
- Wilfred Grantham as customer
- Garard Green as reporter
- John Stuart as book man
- Totti Truman Taylor as lady

== Production ==
It was one of only two films directed by Herrington, the other being The Nudist Story (1960), also produced by the Danzigers.

== Critical reception ==
The Monthly Film Bulletin wrote: "Routine Danzigers crime contribution, lacking in both excitement and conviction."

Chibnall and McFarlane in The British 'B' Film called the film: "notably under-nourished in motivation and characterisation."

TV Guide wrote: "there's nothing special about this British programmer."

Britmovie called the film an "unexceptional second-feature crime drama."
