= Return of a Stranger (1961 film) =

British film by Max Varnel

- Directed by: Max Varnel
- Written by: Brian Clemens
- Produced by: Edward J. Danziger; Harry Lee Danziger
- Starring: John Ireland; Susan Stephen
- Cinematography: Walter J. Harvey
- Edited by: Spencer Reeve
- Music by: Bill Le Sage
- Production company: Danziger Productions Ltd.
- Distributed by: Warner-Pathé Distributors (UK)
- Release date: 7 December 1961
- Running time: 63 minutes
- Country: United Kingdom
- Language: English

Return of a Stranger is a 1961 British second feature thriller film directed by Max Varnel and starring John Ireland and Susan Stephen. It was written by Brian Clemens and produced by The Danzigers.

== Plot ==
The quiet suburban world of Pam and John Allen is shattered when a strange man begins stalking them with late night phone calls and sudden disturbing appearances. It emerges that the man, Homer Trent, was a part of Pam's teenage past at an orphanage. He was besotted with her then, and was eventually imprisoned for her rape. Now free, Trent is intent on claiming Pam.

== Cast ==
- John Ireland as John Allen
- Susan Stephen as Pam Allen
- Cyril Shaps as Homer Trent
- Timothy Beaton as Tommy Allen
- Patrick McAlinney as Whittaker
- Kevin Stoney as Wayne
- Ian Fleming as Meecham
- Raymond Rollett as Somerset
- Frederick Piper as Fred
- Martin Carthy as lift boy

== Critical reception ==
Monthly Film Bulletin said "The suspense of a happy household jeopardised by a homicidal psychopath is steadily built up in this compact if rather predictable Danzigers' thriller. Unfortunately the direction is careless and the acting undisciplined, so that the opening promise of mysterious phone calls and a lurking figure from the past is none too successfully fulfilled. Smarter editing, too, might have given the picture the element of surprise it badly needs."

Britmovie called the film a "Creepy yet risible Brian Clemens scripted quota-quickie thriller from low-budget specialists the Danziger Brothers."

TV Guide gave it two out of four stars, and called it a "Creepy, very suspenseful thriller ... Taut direction by Varnel and good performances from the principals make this one memorable."
