= Operation Murder =

1957 British film by Ernest Morris

- U.S. 1-sheet poster
- Directed by: Ernest Morris
- Written by: Brian Clemens
- Produced by: Edward J. Danziger; Harry Lee Danziger
- Starring: Tom Conway; Sandra Dorne; Patrick Holt
- Cinematography: James Wilson
- Edited by: Anne Barker
- Music by: Edwin Astley
- Production company: Danziger Productions
- Distributed by: Associated British-Pathé (UK)
- Release date: January 1957 (UK)
- Running time: 66 minutes
- Country: United Kingdom
- Language: English

Operation Murder is a 1957 British 'B' crime film directed by Ernest Morris and starring Tom Conway, Patrick Holt and Sandra Dorne. It was written by Brian Clemens and produced by the Danzinger brothers.

== Plot ==
A scheme by two doctors to establish an alibi for a killing by switching roles in the operating theatre is foiled by the insight of a detective and the chance action of a small boy.

== Cast ==
- Tom Conway as Dr. Wayne
- Patrick Holt as Dr. Bowen
- Sandra Dorne as Pat Wayne
- John Stone as Inspector Price
- Virginia Keiley as Julie
- Rosamund John as Head Nurse
- Frank Hawkins as Sargeant Vine
- Robert Ayres as Larry Vinton
- Gilbert Winfield as garage attendant
- Timothy Fitzgerald as Harry Bright
- Alastair Hunter as Williams

== Critical reception ==
The Monthly Film Bulletin wrote: "The familiar crime-and-detection formulas are applied in a manner conventional to the point of dullness; and the acting does little to brighten things up. Perhaps the reason the scenes in the operating theatre (reminiscent, as they are, of something better) achieve so little tension is because the locale itself has become so stereotyped."

Kine Weekly wrote: "Unpretentious and untidy British thriller. ... The cast contains popular names, but the leading players fail to achieve the impossible and seal the many loopholes in its sketchy script. Both surprise and punch are lacking. ... The picture has a novel idea, but its ingenuity is dissipated by unsubtle treatment. John Stone does a neat job as Inspector Price, but Tom Conway and Patrick Holt are forced to behave as if they want their heads examined as Doctors Wayne and Bowen and Sandra Dorne is completely wasted as Wayne's extravagant wife. The staging, too, leaves something to be desired, and so does the dialogue. Definitely made on frayed cuff."

The Daily Film Renter called the film: "a routine affair, acted with a fair measure of competence all round."

In British Sound Films: The Studio Years 1928–1959 David Quinlan rated the film as "poor", writing: "Dull drama, described by one critic as 'clinical claptrap'."
