= Man from Interpol =

1960 British television series

- Man from Interpol title card
- Also known as: Detective's Diary
- Starring: Richard Wyler; John Longden
- Composer: Tony Crombie
- Country of origin: United Kingdom
- No. of seasons: 1
- No. of episodes: 39

Production
- Producers: Edward J. Danziger; Harry Lee Danziger
- Running time: 30 mins
- Production company: The Danzigers

Original release
- Network: NBC; ITV
- Release: 30 January – 22 October 1960

Richard Wyler as Anthony Smith in Man from Interpol.

Man from Interpol is a 1960 television series produced by The Danzigers. The NBC series was filmed the United Kingdom, and the music was scored by jazz musician Tony Crombie.

== Background ==
By early 1959, Danziger Productions were in their fourth year of Saber of London / The Vise at their own newly-built near the village of Elstree. This made it the only one of the Elstree Studios studio not built in Borehamwood.

The studio had begun developing an Interpol-themed follow-up in spring 1958. Kinematograph Weekly reported in April 1958 that "A New Danziger television series called Interpol started shooting at New Elstree last week with Denis Shaw in the lead," but noted complications as Julian Windle and Leslie Parkyn had "already acquired the world exclusive rights from Interpol to make a television series based on Interpol's activities, with scripts written around actual cases in the files at the organisation's Paris headquarters."

By October 1958 the series was shooting as Caesar Smith—Interpol Agent at New Elstree. Variety reported a "three-cornered legal tussle... over the use of 'Interpol' in the title," with Warwick Productions – the company helmed by Irving Allen and Albert R. Broccoli – instituting legal action against Danziger Productions and urging the Rank Organisation to drop its own project Interpol Calling. Warwick claimed copyright due to a feature film of that title still in commercial release. The Danziger Bros. had "already completed the first two in their series" at that point.

The order was for a batch of 39 half-hours called Caesar Smith-Interpol Agent. One early entry was released theatrically in the UK as a supporting feature, The Great Van Robbery (6,350 ft, U.A., 16 February 1959). The trade synopsis described "Caesar Smith, an Interpol detective from Scotland Yard" investigating a £150,000 Royal Mint van robbery, with Denis Shaw as "the shrewd and courageous Smith," produced by Edward J. and Harry Lee Danziger, directed by Max Varnel, story by Brian Clemens and Eldon Howard, and photography by Nick Roeg.

In June 1959 the project was re-launched as The Man from Interpol. Variety noted that Malcolm Arnold, who had written the theme for The Bridge on the River Kwai, had been signed to score The Man From Interpol vidpic series now in production at the new Elstree studios, with Richard Wyler, the American star, in the lead." The series was described as "an expansion of the idea from their Interpol Calling series which has now suspended production at Pinewood after the completion of the first 14 half-hours," the latter a Rank and Jack Wrather partnership. The Danziger version had already been sold to Associated-Rediffusion for the ITV network but not yet offered to U.S. TV, while the "Mark Saber series [was] due to start its sixth year with Donald Gray continuing as the private eye." The Danzigers also had lined up The Cheaters and a colour series The Adventures of Ali Baba for UA-TV to follow.

The series was bought by Sterling Drug and ran on NBC, Saturdays at 10:30 p.m., from January 30, 1960, while they were still releasing new episodes of the Danziger's previous series Saber of London on Sundays on the same network.

After its first run ended on 22 October 1960, the series was shown as NBC's Detective's Diary, from 14 January 1961, with reruns of Saber of London ending on 7 January.

== Premise ==
Anthony Smith, an agent based at Britain's Interpol Division at Scotland Yard, takes on international assignments dealing with murderers, drug smugglers and slave runners.

== Cast ==
- Richard Wyler as Interpol Agent Anthony Smith
- John Longden as Superintendent Mercer
- John Serret as Inspector Gouthier / Inspector Frenay (French Police Chief)
- Peter Allenby as Ricardi, of the Italian Carabineri

== Episodes ==
No.	Title	Directed by	Written by	Original release date (NBC)	Ref
1	"Nest of Vipers"	Godfrey Grayson	Brian Clemens	January 30, 1960	
2	"The Feathered Friend"	Godfrey Grayson	Brian Clemens	February 6, 1960	
3	"Soul Pedlars"	Max Varnel	George St. George	February 13, 1960	
4	"Odds on Murder"	Godfrey Grayson	Eldon Howard	February 20, 1960	
5	"The Key Witness"	Godfrey Grayson	Brian Clemens	February 27, 1960	
6	"Escape Route"	Ernest Morris	Stanley Miller	March 5, 1960	
7	"All the Dead Were Harrisons"	Godfrey Grayson	Mark Grantham	March 12, 1960	
8	"Love by Extortion"	Montgomery Tully	Brian Clemens	March 19, 1960	
9	"The Dollmaker"	Robert Lynn	Unknown	March 26, 1960	
10	"No Other Way"	Ernest Morris	Eldon Howard	April 2, 1960	
11	"The Trap"	Godfrey Grayson	Brian Clemens	April 9, 1960	
12	"The Man Who Sold Hope"	Robert Lynn	Brian Clemens	April 16, 1960	
13	"The Murder Racket"	Godfrey Grayson	Unknown	April 23, 1960	
14	"Death Via Parcel Post"	Montgomery Tully	Mark Grantham	April 30, 1960	
15	"Out of Thin Air"	Montgomery Tully	Brian Clemens	May 7, 1960	
16	"The Case of Mike Krello"	Montgomery Tully	Eldon Howard	May 14, 1960	
17	"Killer with a Long Arm"	Montgomery Tully	Brian Clemens	May 21, 1960	
18	"Murder in the Smart Set"	Montgomery Tully	Mark Grantham	May 28, 1960	
19	"The Front Man"	Unknown	Unknown	June 4, 1960	
20	"Murder Below Deck"	Montgomery Tully	Mark Grantham	June 11, 1960	
21	"International Diamond Incident"	Montgomery Tully	Unknown	June 18, 1960	
22	"The Last Words"	Godfrey Grayson	Brian Clemens	June 25, 1960	
23	"The Maharajah of Den"	Peter Curran	Eldon Howard	July 2, 1960	
24	"Diplomatic Courier"	Montgomery Tully	Howard Eldon	July 9, 1960	
25	"Inside Job"	Godfrey Grayson	Brian Clemens	July 16, 1960	
26	"A Woman in Paris"	Montgomery Tully	Eldon Howard	July 23, 1960	
27	"Mistaken Identity"	Godfrey Grayson	Brian Clemens	July 30, 1960	
28	"Man Alone"	Max Varnel	Brian Clemens	August 6, 1960	
29	"Missing Child"	Max Varnel	Eldon Howard	August 13, 1960	
30	"The Big Thirst"	Godfrey Grayson	Unknown	August 20, 1960	
31	"My Brother's Keeper"	Godfrey Grayson	Unknown	August 27, 1960	
32	"Death in Oils"	Godfrey Grayson	Mark Grantham	September 3, 1960	
33	"Multi-Murder"	Godfrey Grayson	Brian Clemens	September 10, 1960	
34	"Latest Fashions in Crime"	Godfrey Grayson	Unknown	September 17, 1960	
35	"The Art of Murder"	Godfrey Grayson	Unknown	September 24, 1960	
36	"The Child of Eve"	Godfrey Grayson	Unknown	October 1, 1960	
37	"Tight Secret"	Godfrey Grayson	Ken Taylor	October 8, 1960	
38	"The Big Racket"	Godfrey Grayson	Brian Clemens	October 15, 1960	
39	"The Golden Shiri"	Montgomery Tully	Mark Grantham	October 22, 1960	

=== Title sequence ===
Original 1960 title card. Its removal in later prints accounts for a sudden jump seen in available episodes.

In its original form, as seen in the episode "Killer with a Long Arm", the series title caption opens with a panning shot from the roof of Scotland Yard down to ground level, where Anthony Smith exits through Deans Gate and stands by the road. The camera zooms in on Smith as the words "Man", then "from", then "Interpol" are superimposed in sequence. As the shot moves closer, the credit "Starring Richard Wyler as Anthony Smith in" is superimposed, followed by the episode title.

In most prints currently in circulation, this sequence is truncated. The pan down Scotland Yard begins half-way down the building, the zoom-in occurs without the superimposed titles, and there is a sudden cut to the close-up as the episode title appears.

== Broadcast and streaming ==
The series was first broadcast in the United Kingdom on the ITV network in September 1960, where it was listed in the Wednesday schedule for the ITA/ITV network. The series continued to appear on ITV regional schedules until 1969.

The series was repeated on the UK satellite channel Bravo between 1989 and 1996. Listings for at least 32 episodes have been located in the British Newspaper Archive.

In April 2025 Talking Pictures TV began a repeat run from the Danziger archive billed as a new series.

Episodes shown were:

- 29 April 2025 – The Feathered Friend
- 6 May 2025 – Odds on Murder
- 13 May 2025 – The Key Witness
- 20 May 2025 – All the Dead Were Harrisons
- 27 May 2025 – No Other Way
- 3 June 2025 – Killer with a Long Arm
- 10 June 2025 – Murder in the Smart Set
- 17 June 2025 – Mistaken Identity
- 24 June 2025 – A Man Alone

The episodes are made available on the channel's catch-up service TPTV Encore.

== Home media ==
=== Germany ===
In June 2017 Pidax Film released the German-dubbed episodes as Der Mann von Interpol (Man from Interpol) [2 DVDs]

- Die weiße Taube / The Feathered Friend
- Der Kronzeuge / The Key Witness
- Die Trauminsel / Escape Route
- Ein tödliches Souvenir / The Dollmaker
- Goldregen / Out of Thin Air
- Auf falscher Fährte / Murder in the Smart Set
- Die letzten Worte / The Last Words
- Verbrechen an Bord / Murder Below Deck
- Die Safeknacker / Tight Secret
- Falsche Papiere / Mistaken Identity
- Der kleine Sohn des Botschafters / The Missing Child
- 20 Stangen Dynamit / Multi-Murder
- Das Vermächtnis / The Art of Murder

=== United Kingdom ===
A four-episode compilation The Danziger Crime Series was released on DVD in the UK on 18 July 2016 containing two episodes of Saber of London and two episodes of Man from Interpol – Escape Route and The Big Racket sourced from recordings of Bravo screenings.

== Reception ==
According to BFI Screenonline "this uneasy attempt to graft a youthful hero (Wyler's boyish projection) on to a rugged crime-buster framework usually associated with more mature leading characters - Charles Korvin's Inspector Duval in the 1959–1960 series Interpol Calling (ITV), for instance – gave The Man from Interpol little more than an air of tired hysteria."
