= Part-Time Wife (1961 film) =

1961 British film by Max Varnel

- DVD cover
- Directed by: Max Varnel
- Written by: H. M. McCormack
- Produced by: Edward J. Danziger; Harry Lee Danziger
- Starring: Anton Rogers; Nyree Dawn Porter
- Cinematography: Walter J. Harvey
- Edited by: John Dunsford
- Production company: Danziger Productions
- Distributed by: British Lion Film Corporation (UK)
- Release date: December 1961 (UK)
- Running time: 70 minutes
- Country: United Kingdom
- Language: English

Part-Time Wife is a 1961 British black and white 'B' comedy film directed by Max Varnel and starring Anton Rodgers and Nyree Dawn Porter. It was written by H. M. McCormack and produced by The Danzigers.

== Plot ==
Footloose and fancy-free bachelor Drew needs to find a wife to impress a visiting rich uncle. The uncle has made it clear Drew will only inherit his business when he's married and respectable. Drew's friends Tom and Jenny agree to help him out by allowing Jenny to pose as his wife. Tom is a struggling insurance salesman, and Drew promises him a big insurance deal to add incentive. Farcical complications ensue.

== Cast ==
- Anton Rodgers as Tom
- Nyree Dawn Porter as Jenny
- Kenneth J. Warren as Drew
- Henry McCarthy as Whitworth
- Mark Singleton as detective
- Neil Hallett as detective
- Susan Richards as Miss Aukland
- Raymond Rollett as Barnsdale
- June Cunningham as blonde
- Dudy Nimmo as Miss Fallon
- Anna Gerber as receptionist
- Jan Conrad as bartender
- Alan Browning as Police Sergeant
- Max Butterfield as Joe
- George Roderick as Al
- Michael Peake as Phil

== Critical reception ==
The Monthly Film Bulletin wrote: "Anton Rodgers is engaging enough as the harassed husband, but in general the cast can do little with this dog-eared farce, which lacks any kind of effervescence."

Kine Weekly wrote: "The script has a few dog-ears, but most are ironed out by the resourceful cast before the curtain drops. Adequately staged and about right for size, the play should tickle the not too sophisticated. ... The picture, which uses bed as a springboard, cracks one or two bright, if predictable, jokes during the first half, and slightly extends its scope towards the finish. Anton Rodgers amuses as the harassed Tom, Nyree Dawn Porter makes a tantalising Jenny, and Kenneth J. Warren is a typical wolf as Deer. The rest get by. Artless fun, despite its A certificate, the romp's acceptable mass light fare."

The Radio Times gave the film two out of five stars, writing, "competent performances fail to add sparkle to the tired plot."
