= Sentenced for Life (1960 film) =

1960 British film by Max Varnel

- British theatrical poster
- Directed by: Max Varnel
- Written by: Mark Grantham; Eldon Howard
- Produced by: Edward J. Danziger; Harry Lee Danziger
- Starring: Basil Dignam; Jack Gwillim; Francis Matthews; Jill Williams
- Cinematography: S.D. Onions
- Music by: Tony Crombie; Albert Elms
- Production company: Danziger Productions
- Distributed by: United Artists Corporation (UK)
- Release date: 1960
- Running time: 64 mins
- Country: United Kingdom
- Language: English

Sentenced for Life is a low budget 1960 British second feature crime film directed by Max Varnel and starring Basil Dignam, Jack Gwillim, Francis Matthews, and Jill Williams. It was written by Mark Grantham and Eldon Howard and produced by The Danzigers.

== Plot ==
Engineer John Richards is wrongly accused of selling secrets to enemy agents, and receives a life sentence in prison. Richards suspects his ex-partner Ralph Thompson is responsible for framing him, and asks his son, Jim, a law student, to investigate.

== Cast ==
- Basil Dignam as Ralph Thompson
- Jack Gwillim as John Richards
- Francis Matthews as Jim Richards
- Jill Williams as Sue Thompson
- Mark Singleton as Edward Thompson
- Nyree Dawn Porter as Betty Martin
- Lorraine Clewes as Mrs. Richards
- Arnold Bell as Williams
- Philip Hollis as Turner
- John M. Moore as Butler
- Garard Green as doctor

== Critical reception ==
The Monthly Film Bulletin wrote: "A workmanlike but unsubtle pot-boiler, with little or no claim to originality, in the familiar Danziger mould."

TV Guide called Sentenced for Life a "standard crime drama with a touch of espionage thrown in to spice up the incredibly bland stew."

Britmovie noted "you’ll struggle to stay awake whilst Francis Matthews attempts to resolve a miscarriage of justice."
