= Man Accused =

1959 British film by Montgomery Tully

- Theatrical release poster
- Directed by: Montgomery Tully
- Story by: Mark Grantham
- Produced by: Edward J. Danziger; Harry Lee Danziger
- Starring: Ronald Howard; Carol Marsh
- Edited by: Lee Doig
- Production company: Danziger Productions Ltd
- Release date: 6 November 1959
- Running time: 58 minutes
- Country: United Kingdom
- Language: English

Man Accused is a 1959 British second feature ('B') crime film directed by Montgomery Tully and starring Ronald Howard and Carol Marsh. It was written by Mark Grantham and produced by The Danzigers.

== Plot ==
Bob Jensen becomes engaged to Kathy, a baronet's daughter, but finds himself framed for murder and consequently imprisoned. He manages to break out of jail, and begins a search for the real killers.

== Cast ==
- Ronald Howard as Bob Jensen
- Carol Marsh as Kathy
- Ian Fleming as Sir Thomas
- Catharina Ferraz as Anna
- Robert Dorning as Beckett
- Stuart Saunders as Curran
- Brian Nissen as Derek
- Kenneth Edwardes as Hawkins the butler
- Colin Tapley as Inspector
- Howard Lang as Sergeant
- Gordon Needham as constable
- Graham Ashley as warder

== Critical reception ==
The Monthly Film Bulletin wrote: "Variably acted and tamely presented, this conventional frame-up tale relies chiefly on the story line to hold the attention. In its un-exacting fashion it does so until a ludicrous escape scene destroys all interest in the outcome."

Picturegoer wrote: "It's mercifully short – the film runs under an hour – but the lively pace stifles yawns."

In British Sound Films: The Studio Years 1928–1959 David Quinlan rated the film as “poor” and wrote: "Careless presentation and a tired format that’s played out.''

Chibnall and McFarlane in The British 'B' Film called the film "mildly twisty", adding that Carol Marsh was "a more distinctively distraught heroine than most".

TV Guide wrote: "this poorly-made work follows every convention of its hackneyed wronged-man plot and ultimately offers nothing at all."
