= Adventure Theater =

American TV dramatic anthology series

- Also known as: Calling Scotland Yard
- Genre: Drama
- Directed by: Paul Dickson
- Country of origin: United States
- Original language: English
- No. of seasons: 1
- No. of episodes: 13

Production
- Executive producers: Edward J. Danziger; Harry Lee Danziger
- Running time: 26–28 minutes
- Production companies: Danziger Productions, Ltd.

Original release
- Network: NBC
- Release: June 16 – September 1, 1956

Adventure Theater is a dramatic anthology series that aired on NBC from June 16, 1956, through September 1, 1956. The series was produced in England under the title Mayfair Mystery House in 1953, but was never broadcast there as a series. It was also known as Calling Scotland Yard.

== Series structure ==
Actor Paul Douglas was the program's host and introduced each of the two-act plays that composed the series. Each introduction involved a memento or souvenir that he had brought back from England. The story about the object led into that week's episode.

== Production ==
The series was developed as a syndicated half-hour mystery anthology for Paramount Television Productions. On March 16, 1953, Broadcasting Telecasting reported that Paramount had begun production in London on a new series of half-hour dramatic mystery films for television, produced by Edward J. and Harry Lee Danziger.

By June 1953 the series was titled Mayfair Mystery House and was being completed at the Riverside Studios in London. Variety reported on June 3, 1953, that eleven of the thirteen episodes were already filmed except for narrations, and that Paramount was seeking a U.S. film star "of the stature of Douglas Fairbanks, Jr." to provide introductions. The report noted the series was produced by the Danzigers with British casts, scripted by Hollywood writers including novelist Paul Tabori, and photographed by Jack Cox.

Original 1953 title cards billed as Mayfair Mystery House Starring Mr. X, before Paul Douglas was signed as host in July 1953.

The original format was to be hosted by an unseen narrator billed as "Mr. X", as seen in surviving 16mm prints. On July 14, 1953, The Hollywood Reporter announced Paul Douglas had been signed to narrate and provide connecting footage for the series, replacing the Mr. X device. The report stated the Danzigers had completed thirteen episodes and were working on an additional thirty-six, with Douglas's linking material to be filmed in London.

== United Kingdom theatrical release ==
The thirteen episodes were produced for American television at Riverside Studios in 1953, but were first exploited theatrically in the United Kingdom by Paramount Film Service Ltd, which repackaged the 27-minute films as British quota supporting shorts and as two compilation features to qualify for the Eady Levy.

On 30 July 1953 Kinematograph Weekly reported that Murder in Three Acts, made in Britain by Edward J. and Harry Lee Danziger, would be leased by Paramount and shown at the Plaza, Piccadilly Circus in early August, starring Kay Walsh, Howard Marion Crawford and Betty Ann Davies, introduced by Gilbert Harding and directed by Paul Dickson.

On 5 August 1953 Variety placed the release in a wider trend, noting that American telefilms made in London were being linked in threes to make full-length features that qualified as British quota and were entitled to the Eady Levy, then about 36% of the gross. The article noted that Paramount had followed the trend with the Danziger feature Murder in Three Acts.

The film was certified by the BBFC on 18 August 1953 under its original title. On 27 August 1953 Kinematograph Weekly announced Paramount had changed the title of Murder in Three Acts to Gilbert Harding Speaking of Murder.

The 76-minute (6,840 ft) feature premiered on 4 December 1953. Produced by Edward J. and Harry Lee Danziger, directed by Paul Dickson, photographed by Jack Cox, edited by Thelma Connell, with music by Edwin Astley and art direction by John Elphick, it comprises three stories introduced by Harding: "The Missing Passenger" (Kay Walsh, Betty Ann Davies, Patrick Barr), "Falstaff's Fur Coat" (Howard Marion Crawford) and "Thirty Days to Die" (Hubert Gregg, Laurence Naismith).

A second compilation, Tale of Three Women, was certified on 19 March 1954 (7,650 ft / 85 mins) and released on 14 June 1954. Produced by Edward J. and Harry Lee Danziger, directed by Paul Dickson and Thelma Connell, photographed by Jack Cox and James Wilson, with music by Edwin Astley and written by Paul Tabori, James Eastwood and George Mikes, it comprises "The Wedding Gift" (Hazel Court, Derek Bond, David Horne), "The Thief of London" (Jack Watling, Gene Anderson, Peter Gawthorne, Helene Cordet) and "The Final Twist" (Karel Stepanek, Catherine Finn, Philip Leaver).

Individual episodes were also released as 26-28 minute supporting shorts through Paramount Film Service Ltd:

- The Javanese Dagger – 28m – 4 November 1953
- The Sable Scarf – 28m – 4 November 1953
- Stranger on the Sea – 27m – 26 March 1954
- The Wilful Widow – 27m – 2 April 1954
- The Mystery of Pleasant Avenue (US: The Corpse of Pleasant Avenue) – 27m – 22 June 1954
- The Man Who Stayed Alive – 26m 21s – 22 June 1954
- Motive for Murder (US:The Ripper Strikes/The Marriage Trap) – 26m – 22 June 1954

Between the two compilation features and the seven supporting shorts, all thirteen episodes filmed in 1953 received a UK cinema release.

Two of the shorts later received rare UK television screenings on Talking Pictures TV. The Man Who Stayed Alive was broadcast on 15 November 2025 at 09:00 and repeated on 17 April 2026 at 08:30, Thirty Days to Die was broadcast on 21 June 2026 at 19:30, billed as The Vise - 30 Days to Die and presented with The Vise opening and closing credits but retaining the Paul Douglas introduction.

== United States theatrical release as Calling Scotland Yard ==
The same thirteen films were acquired for the United States by Paramount Pictures Corp. and initially released as a series of theatrical short subjects under the title Calling Scotland Yard. Only six of the thirteen were given a US cinema release; the remaining seven were copyrighted separately as 16mm prints suitable for television.

Paramount announced on 3 February 1954 it had acquired six 30-minute detective films made independently in England for release in lieu of a conventional second feature, at a time when about 70% of American exhibitors still required double bills but found a two-hour feature plus a 65-minute second feature too long.

On 11 February 1954 distribution president A. W. Schwalberg announced a February to April schedule of six three-reelers billed as Calling Scotland Yard with Paul Douglas as narrator. On 17 February 1954 it was confirmed the pix would be under the one series title Calling Scotland Yard with Douglas as narrator, and that more would follow if the first six clicked.

The six released theatrically were:

- The Javanese Dagger
- The Missing Passenger
- Falstaff's Fur Coat
- The Final Twist
- The Sable Scarf
- Present for a Bride (Wedding Gift)

Paramount screened the first three on 19 March 1954. The trade reported each was a complete story with Douglas as narrator, and that exhibitors could book the series or select individual units. Asked about television because of the 27-minute length, short subjects sales manager Oscar Morgan denied TV plans.

Famous Players Canadian Corp. booked the six for all its theatres on 17 May 1954 as half of double bills or added attractions.

The remaining seven episodes were not released as 35mm theatrical shorts. They were copyrighted separately by Danziger Productions, Ltd. as 16mm prints suitable for television:

- The Corpse of Pleasant Avenue (The Mystery of Pleasant Avenue)
- The Wilful Widow
- The Thief of London
- The Ripper Strikes (The Marriage Trap / Motive for Murder)
- Strangers on the Sea (Stranger on the Sea)
- The Man Who Stayed Alive
- Thirty Days to Die

== Network television broadcast as Adventure Theater ==
After the experiment with six episodes as theatrical shorts by Paramount in the United States failed to 'click' with exhibitors, all thirteen films were repackaged for network television as a summer replacement for Your Hit Parade.

=== 1956 NBC announcement ===
On 5 June 1956 NBC Trade News announced:

SERIES OF THRILLERS, FILMED IN ENGLAND, TO BE TELECAST IN U.S. FOR FIRST TIME ON NEW 'ADVENTURE THEATRE' ADVENTURE THEATRE, a new suspense series of half-hour film features made in England and never before seen in this country, will star Paul Douglas as host, commencing Saturday, June 16 on NBC-TV (10:30 p.m., EDT) and continuing through Sept. 1. "Adventure Theatre" succeeds "Your Hit Parade" for the Summer season. "Your Hit Parade" concludes its current season Saturday, June 9 and returns to NBC-TV Saturday, Sept. 8.

Alternating sponsors were Warner-Lambert, Inc. for Richard Hudnut's Quick Home Permanents (starting June 16) through Kenyon and Eckhardt, Inc., and the American Tobacco Co. for Lucky Strike Cigarettes (starting June 23) through Batten, Barton, Durstine and Osborn, Inc.

=== 1956 episodes ===
Your Hit Parade's hiatus left only twelve Saturdays between June 16 and September 1, so although thirteen films had been produced, NBC listed twelve titles:

- Thirty Days to Die – June 16
- Javanese Dagger – June 23
- The Corpse of Pleasant Avenue (The Mystery of Pleasant Avenue) – June 30
- Willful Widow (The Wilful Widow) – July 7
- The Thief of London – July 14
- Marriage Trap (The Marriage Trap / The Ripper Strikes) – July 21
- The Sable Scarf – July 28
- Strangers on the Sea (Stranger on the Sea) – Aug. 4
- Falstaff's Fur Coat – Aug. 11
- Present for the Bride – Aug. 18 [listed as Wedding Gift in 1957 newspaper listings]
- The Missing Passenger – Aug. 25
- The Final Twist – Sept. 1

The thirteenth film, The Man Who Stayed Alive, was never broadcast.

=== 1957 repeat run ===
The series returned in 1957 with repeats of the original 12 episodes in a different order. In newspaper listings for 1957, the episode broadcast in 1956 as Present for the Bride is listed as Wedding Gift.

No contemporary publicity, titles or on-screen content for the NBC Adventure Theater run uses the Calling Scotland Yard name. The NBC announcement describes the series as "half-hour film features made in England and never before seen in this country".

No network broadcast of the series in the United States has been traced after the 1956 and 1957 runs.

== Episodes ==
Thirteen half-hour films were produced by Danziger Productions at Riverside Studios in 1953 as Mayfair Mystery House. All were released in the United Kingdom as supporting shorts. Six were released theatrically in the United States as 35mm shorts under the Calling Scotland Yard banner. The remaining seven were copyrighted as 16mm prints for television. Twelve were broadcast on NBC as Adventure Theater in 1956, and again in 1957.

No.	UK cinema title	Alternative titles	Guest cast	NBC airdate
1	"Thirty Days to Die"	The Vise: 30 Days to Die [Talking Pictures TV]	Hubert Gregg, Laurence Naismith, Jenny Laird, Arthur Lowe	16 June 1956
An ailing playwright turns the tables on a malicious critic who walked out in the third act and predicted the ending, closing the play. He threatens to kill the critic in 30 days unless he can predict the method of his own murder, writing the plan into a post-mortem play. He charges the critic with a knife, there is a blackout, and the critic is then convicted of his murder, allowing the playwright to cheat justice and leave his wife the insurance.
2	"The Javanese Dagger"	-	Yvonne Furneaux, Vanda Godsell, Anthony Nicholls, Alan Wheatley	23 June 1956
Jealous of her husband Lord Tressall [Anthony Nicholls (actor)] painting his supposedly dead first wife Wanda [Vanda Gosell] from memory, Vanessa [Yvonne Furneaux] slashes the portrait with a Javanese dagger. Anonymous letters then claim her marriage is invalid. Following instructions, she finds Wanda alive, embittered and living with pilot Victor [Alan Wheatley], who faked their death in a plane crash for a crime syndicate. Wanda threatens Vanessa with the dagger and falls on it in the struggle. Vanessa is tried for murder until Victor, despite his boss, recovers the missing dagger and clears her.
3	"The Mystery of Pleasant Avenue"	The Corpse of Pleasant Avenue [Adventure Theater]	Laidman Browne, Helen Gross, Peter Martyn	30 June 1956
A businessman thinks he has murdered the unpleasant wooer of his daughter, attempts to cover up the crime, but comes across him again, alive, and shoots him.
4	"The Wilful Widow"	-	Derek Blomfield, Noel Dyson, George maker	7 July 1956
A story which is supposed to be founded on fact, it tells of how two minor crooks get a wealthy widow into their clutches and finally murder her so that they can get money to pay off a master crook who is demanding £500.
5	"The Thief of London"	-	Jack Watling, Gene Anderson, Peter Gawthorne, Hélène Cordet, Michael Ripper	14 July 1956
Dick [Jack Watling], the light-fingered son of the wealthy Sir Frederick [Peter Gawthorne], has a strange knack for stealing. He turns to burglary, taking everything from small items to railroad engines and planes and is disowned by his father. His ex-army batman, Simpkins [Michael Ripper] and loyal fiancée, Pamela [Gene Anderson], conspire to hide the items he steals to protect him. Facing prosecution, Dick is saved by Simpkins and Pamela, who persuade him to put his gifts to legitimate use by first opening his father's safe and then becoming a professional entertainer - as a stage pickpocket.
6	"Motive for Murder"	Marriage Trap [Adventure Theater] /The Ripper Strikes [US Copyright listing]	Maurice Denham, Cameron Hall, Josephine Huntley-Wright [as Jo Huntley Wright]	21 July 1956
Four identical murders are committed in London. A barber's razor left as a calling card at each scene is the only clue.
7	"The Sable Scarf"	-	Judy Campbell, Hugh Latimer, John Laurie	28 July 1956
A fortune teller [Judy Campbell] whose husband returned from the war, feeds her information on missing soldiers, which she sells to grieving neighbours as crystal-ball readings. When he discovers she has a lover and threatens exposure, she stabs him to death. Scotland Yard fixes the crime through a scarf and a scar on the dead man's arm.
8	"Stranger on the Sea"	Strangers on the Sea [various sources]	Stephen Murray, Gordon McLeod, Leslie Phillips, Robert Raglan	4 August 1956
A honeymooning couple are on a sea voyage. When the young bride is seriously injured, they trust in the medical aid of a fellow passenger, whom everyone believes to be a doctor, but is in fact a criminally insane fugitive.
9	"Falstaff's Fur Coat"	-	Howard Marion-Crawford, Wilfred Caithness	11 August 1956
A pompous Shakespearean ham actor [Howard Marian Crawford] is unwillingly sold a fur-rimmed coat by a tailor, into the pockets of which thieves drop the valuables they have stolen, in the belief he is a member of the gang. The tailor is murdered for selling the coat, a duplicate of others used by the gang. The police persuade the actor to tell the newspapers he knows the murderer. The gang shoots him while he is performing on the stage, and the police get the gang. It is only then that the part played by the coat becomes known. The actor goes on through life with an inflated ego because the bullet hadn't punctured him sufficiently.
10	"The Wedding Gift"	Present for a Bride [Calling Scotland Yard] / Present for the Bride [Adventure Theater NBC 18 Aug 1956] / Wedding Gift [Adventure Theater NBC 31 Aug 1957]	David Horne, Derek Bond, Hazel Court, Oliver Johnston	18 August 1956
Wealthy diamond merchant Hines has never married. Friend Max introduces him to Trudi, a model posing as an Austrian countess with a vast estate. They plan to split the jewels Hines will give his bride. After the marriage, Hines discovers the estate is fake. In the ensuing row Max bludgeons him with a poker, hides the body in the safe and flees. A repairman's routine check opens the safe, the body falls out, and Max is caught with the jewels.
11	"The Missing Passenger"	Ladies of Leisure [Film Review 1953-54]	Kay Walsh, Betty Ann Davies, Patrick Barr, Frank Tilton	25 August 1956
South African farmer Richard [Patrick Barr] visits his native England and calls on two spinster sisters he courted years before, Priscilla [Kay Walsh] and Selina [Betty Ann Davies], who live alone dreaming of what might have been had he married one of them. When they learn he is only paying a visit and is returning to South Africa the next day, Priscilla decides to make him pay for six years of disappointing courtship. She slips sleeping powder into his wine and persuades him to climb to the tower room to choose a box of butterflies from their collection as a farewell gift. As he comments on the barred window, sleep overcomes him and Priscilla locks the steel door, telling the timid Selina that Richard will never leave them again. His cries for help and escape attempts are foiled by Priscilla's precautions, with food passed through a small hole in the wall. After 20 years he gives up trying to escape. When Priscilla dies, Selina brings his food. He grabs her arm and forces her to unlock the door. She flees in terror from the bearded, wild-eyed prisoner and drops dead from fright, a victim of her own fears, leaving Richard freed of any implication in her death to go his way at last.
12	"The Final Twist"	-	Karel Stepanek, Catherine Finn, Philip Leaver, Patricia Owens, Gordon McLeon, Robert Perceval, Digby Wolfe	1 September 1956
Jeweller Arthur Dykmann [Karel Stepanek] and his wife [Catherine Finn] are overheard quarrelling over music for their tenth anniversary party when police arrive to say his shop has been robbed and his bookkeeper murdered. The insurance inspector accuses Dykmann, who sues for slander and wins after a neighbour testifies the quarrel was heard at the time of the crime, and it is revealed he had insured his stock for three times its value weeks earlier. Years later, Mrs Dykmann finds her husband with her cousin Mary [Patricia Owens] in an Amsterdam hotel. In revenge, she confesses to Inspector Clarke [Robert Perceval] that her husband had been a receiver for stolen jewellery, could not claim for a first robbery, so insured his new stock heavily and staged the robbery himself, using a phonograph record of their quarrel as an alibi, killing his bookkeeper with a poker when he walked in and reached for the phone. She is willing to go to jail herself to punish her husband and Mary.
13	"The Man Who Stayed Alive"	-	Adrienne Corri, Brian Worth, Stephen Vercoe, Maurice Kaufmann, Peter Illing	Not Broadcast
Three impoverished young artists, Michael [Stephen Vercoe], Guy [Maurice Kaufmann] and Robert [Brian Worth], share a studio in Chelsea and struggle for recognition despite their talent. At a party, Robert argues the only good artist is a dead one and suggests one of them should die to gain recognition, leaving his estate, including an undisclosed number of paintings, to his friends to manage. When agent Clifton [Peter Illing] arrives late with news that a client liked two of Michael's paintings but would not value them because the artist had not suffered, they put the plan into action and draw cards to decide who will die. Michael draws the lowest card and is sworn not to tell his girlfriend, Joan [Adrienne Corri] of their scheme. Michael fakes suicide by drowning in Ireland and retires to a secluded cottage in Sussex, while Guy and Robert cash in on his name. Guy and Robert argue about the effect Michael's death is having on Joan, but Michael soon telephones her to reassure her that he is still alive. After Guy makes a move on Joan and is rejected, he volunteers to take canvases for Michael to sign. At the cottage, Guy and Michael fight over Joan; during a struggle with a shotgun, one of the artists is killed.
