= The Cheaters (TV series) =

British TV drama series (1960–1962)

- DVD cover
- Directed by: Max Varnel; John Moxey; Godfrey Grayson; Frank Marshall
- Starring: John Ireland; Robert Ayres
- Composer: Bill Le Sage
- Country of origin: United Kingdom
- No. of seasons: 2
- No. of episodes: 39

Production
- Producers: Edward J. Danziger; Harry Lee Danziger
- Production company: Danziger Productions Ltd for ABC

Original release
- Network: ITV
- Release: 1960 – 1962

The Cheaters is a 1960–1962 British television drama series produced by The Danzigers. The stories revolved around John Hunter, insurance claims investigator for the American Eastern Insurance company. It aired on ITV for two seasons with a total of 39 episodes.

Directors of episodes included Max Varnel, John Moxey, Godfrey Grayson, Bill Lewthwaite and Frank Marshall.

== Recurring cast ==
- John Ireland as John Hunter
- Robert Ayres as Walter Allen
- Ann Hanslip as Walter Allen's secretary
- Valentine Dyall as Inspector Kellogg of Scotland Yard
- Reginald Marsh as Inspector Martin
- Colin Tapley as Inspector

== Episodes ==
1. Flash in the Sky
2. For the Price of Two
3. Green for Danger
4. The Hair of the Dog
5. A Question of Murder
6. The Rocker
7. The Safe Way
8. The Authentic McCoy
9. Diamond Studded Malaria
10. Intent to Defraud
11. Mighty Warrior
12. Single or Double Indemnity
13. Back of Beyond
14. The Fine Print
15. A Hood from Canada
16. Killian's Cut
17. Libel
18. The Man with the Ticking Head
19. Slope of Death
20. The Bite
21. A Case of Larceny
22. Lamb to the Slaughter
23. The Legacy
24. Legs – 50,000 Each
25. Washday S.O.S.
26. The Weasel
27. Time to Kill
28. Murder Fugue
29. Obituary for a Champion
30. Fire!
31. The Man Who Wouldn't Be Paid
32. The Schemers
33. The Hands of Adrian
34. Affairs of the Heart
35. A Tale of Two Ships
36. The Dashing Major
37. Knight of the Road
38. Case of George Peterson
39. Carnival Case

== Reception ==
In a contemporary review of the episode "Obituary for a Champion", Variety wrote: "The Cheaters is a gumshoe half-hour in the familiar penny-pinching production and penny-dreadful dramatic style familiar to the Danziger Bros overseas operation (in this case, England). In the New York preem on WNEW-TV, lead John Ireland, an insurance investigator, tracked the killer of a boxing champ. Woodenly he skulked through a static round of claptrap interiors, encountering a deadly roster of meller stereotypes – the hirsuted promoter (who done it); the alcoholic housekeeper; the punchy pug; the gimmick girl, etc. A John Roeburt script and storyline, as stiff and archaic as a celluloid collar, precluded any meaningful dramatics."

According to BFI Screenonline, "in missing a perfect opportunity to exploit the tough-cynical characteristics of the leading player, the 39 episodes moved with painful lethargy towards their predictable conclusions, with the most notable feature of this largely static series being John Ireland's carefully sustained somnambulistic performance."
