= Brian Clemens =

English screenwriter and television producer (1931–2015)

Brian Clemens OBE
- Born: Brian Horace Clemens; 30 July 1931; Croydon, Surrey, England
- Died: 10 January 2015 (aged 83)
- Occupations: Film and television producer, screenwriter
- Spouse(s): Brenda Prior (m. 1955–1966); Janet Elizabeth Clemens (m. 1979–2015; his death)
- Partner: Diane Enright (~1966–1976) (her death)
- Children: Two with Janet Elizabeth.

Brian Horace Clemens OBE (30 July 1931 – 10 January 2015) was an English screenwriter and television producer. He worked on the espionage television series The Avengers, and created The New Avengers and The Professionals.

== Early life ==
Clemens was born in Croydon, Surrey, to Suzanna (née O'Grady) and Albert, an engineer, who worked in music halls. Clemens said he was related to Mark Twain (Samuel Langhorne Clemens), and reflected this in the naming of his two sons, Samuel Joshua Twain Clemens and George Langhorne Clemens. He left school aged 14.

Following national service in the British Army at Aldershot, where he was a weapons training instructor in the Royal Army Ordnance Corps, Clemens wanted to be a journalist but decided he did not have any qualifications. He was offered a job with a private detective agency, but this involved taking a training course in the city of Leeds and, as he had been away from home in London for two years, he decided he did not want to go away again. Instead, he worked his way up from messenger boy at the J. Walter Thompson advertising agency. While he was a copywriter there, he had a thriller screenplay accepted and shot by BBC TV, Valid for Single Journey Only (1955). This brought him to the attention of the Danziger brothers, independent, low-budget movie producers.

== TV career ==
=== Writer ===
From the mid-1950s onward Clemens was a staff writer for the Danzigers, churning out dozens of quickie scripts for assembly line 'B' movies and half-hour television series such as Mark Saber (ITV, 1957–1959; also known as Saber of London), White Hunter (ITV, 1958–1960), Man from Interpol (ITV, 1960–1961), and Richard The Lionheart (ITV, 1961–1965).

Clemens wrote for ITC Entertainment's thriller series The Invisible Man (ITV, 1958–1959), Sir Francis Drake (ITV, 1961–1962), and Danger Man (ITV, 1960–1961; 1964–1967; also known as Secret Agent), for which he had written the pilot. His output was so prolific during the late 1950s and throughout the 1960s that he frequently used the pseudonym Tony O'Grady.

Clemens wrote the second episode for The Avengers (ITV, 1961–1969) in 1961 but not the pilot, as is often claimed. He also wrote one other episode ("One for the Mortuary") for the first season and multiple episodes of the third season. Beginning in the fourth season, Clemens became the script editor, associate producer and main scriptwriter for the series. Due to his rapid working rate and productivity, Clemens would frequently perform extensive rewrites of other writers' scripts to ensure the show consistently matched his creative sensibilities; fellow Avengers writer Roger Marshall later noted that "his influence pervades almost every scene" of the show's later seasons.

Clemens cast Diana Rigg to replace departing star Honor Blackman in The Avengers. He was later quoted as saying, "I didn't do Diana a very good service. It made her an international star but I think I could have done more for her as far as the script was concerned. She was rather a stooge to Patrick Macnee's Steed." He did not choose Linda Thorson to replace Rigg.

According to the British Film Institute's profile of him, Clemens "brought this spirit of burlesque to his other series – most notably with Adam Adamant Lives! (BBC, 1966–1967), but also with The Baron (ITV, 1966–1967), The Persuaders! (ITV, 1971–1972), The Protectors (ITV, 1972–1974), and The Adventurer (ITV, 1972–1974) – resoundingly poking fun both at the genre they were imitating and the sources of their inspiration."

=== Producer ===
Clemens created the BBC TV sitcom My Wife Next Door (1972) but left the scriptwriting to Richard Waring. The series won a BAFTA Award for Best Situation Comedy Series. Made around the same time, the TV movie The Woman Hunter was scripted by Clemens and fellow ITC writer Tony Williamson from the former's story. It was Clemens's first American credit.

Clemens followed this with a twist-in-the-tail anthology series Thriller (ITV 1973–1976; also known as Menace), for which he wrote all the stories as well as 38 of the scripts.

In the mid-1970s, Clemens sued fellow writer Terry Nation for plagiarism, saying he had given the concept of the 1975 television series Survivors to Nation in the late 1960s and that had he registered the idea with the Writers' Guild of Great Britain in 1965. Nation strenuously denied the allegation. Both sides agreed to discontinue the case due to escalating legal fees.

Clemens, with fellow Avengers producer Albert Fennell and composer Laurie Johnson set up a company, The Avengers (Film and TV) Enterprises Ltd which created a French/Canadian/British co-production, The New Avengers (ITV 1976–1977). The series cost £125,000 an episode to produce and was not a critical success, but sold to 120 countries. To cast the central female role of Purdey, Clemens considered "about 700 girls", interviewed 200, read scripts with 40 and screen-tested 15 before choosing Joanna Lumley. His company Avengers Mark One Productions went on to produce The Professionals (ITV, 1977–1983).

In the early 1980s Clemens was twice asked to produce a U.S. version of his most successful series – The Avengers U.S.A. – for producer Quinn Martin and The Avengers International for Taft Entertainment but neither version materialised. An earlier attempt by Clemens at a US-based Avengers-style series resulted in his writing and co-producing the hour-long pilot film Escapade which was aired by CBS in 1978; again, this project did not proceed to series. However, he did write episodes for the US TV series Darkroom (ABC-TV, 1981–1982), Remington Steele (NBC, 1982–1987), and Max Monroe: Loose Cannon (CBS, 1990).

Back in the UK, Clemens worked on the BBC's Bergerac (1981–1991), the anthologies Hammer House of Mystery and Suspense (ITV, 1984–1986) and Worlds Beyond (ITV, 1984–1989), and adapted Gavin Lyall's espionage thriller The Secret Servant as a three-part drama for the BBC (1984).

Clemens then, in the US again, worked on the Father Dowling Mysteries (NBC, 1989; ABC-TV, 1990–1991), as executive script consultant for the feature-length revival series of Raymond Burr's Perry Mason (CBS, 1985–1995) for which he wrote three teleplays. He wrote for the Dick Van Dyke mystery series Diagnosis: Murder (CBS, 1992–2001).

Clemens wrote for the Bugs TV series in the UK (BBC, 1995–1999) and Highlander: The Series in the US. Clemens's final credit was for Jane Doe: How To Fire Your Boss in 2007.

== Films ==
In 1971, Clemens wrote and produced for Hammer Film Productions Dr. Jekyll and Sister Hyde and, in 1972, wrote and directed Captain Kronos – Vampire Hunter (his only directorial effort). He also wrote the screenplays and/or stories for the feature films Operation Murder (1957), The Tell-Tale Heart (1960), Station Six-Sahara (1963), The Peking Medallion (1967), And Soon the Darkness (1970), See No Evil (1971), The Golden Voyage of Sinbad (1973), The Watcher in the Woods (1980), and Highlander II: The Quickening (1991).

=== Selected filmography ===
- At the Stroke of Nine (1957)
- Operation Murder (1957)
- The Betrayal (1957)
- Moment of Indiscretion (1958) (co-written with Eldon Howard)
- The Secret Man (1959)
- Woman's Temptation (1959)
- An Honourable Murder (1960)
- Mission in Morocco (1960)
- Identity Unknown (1960)
- The Tell-Tale Heart (1960)
- Return of a Stranger (1961)
- Station Six-Sahara (1962)
- The Corrupt Ones (1967)
- And Soon the Darkness (1970)
- Blind Terror (also known as See No Evil; 1971)
- Dr. Jekyll and Sister Hyde (1971)
- The Golden Voyage of Sinbad (1973)
- Captain Kronos – Vampire Hunter (released 1974; filmed 1972) (also director)
- The Watcher in the Woods (1980)
- Highlander II: The Quickening (1991)
- Justine: A Private Affair (1995)

== Theatre ==
In 1988, Clemens wrote the play Holmes and the Ripper, which was inspired by Stephen Knight's book Jack the Ripper: The Final Solution. The play has the great detective Sherlock Holmes and his colleague Dr. Watson become embroiled in the grisly murders in Whitechapel in 1888. The play would be adapted into an audio drama by Big Finish Productions.

In 2008 Clemens wrote the play Murder Hunt, which was performed at The Mill at Sonning and starred David Monteith as Captain K'Maka, a native African policeman who has to find the murderer amongst a bunch of guests stranded at a remote safari lodge. The list of plays he helped to write and produce:

Year	Title	Collaboration	Genre	Notes
1971	The Avengers	Terence Feely		Stage version of television show
1972	Lover		Thriller	
1972	Shock!		Thriller	
1973	Dear Heart	Terence Feely	Drama	Loosely based upon life of Joe Orton
1975	Edge of Darkness		Drama	
1977	Our Kid		One act Drama	Based upon the Moors Murders and Myra Hindley
1979	I'm Only Going to Kill her	Dennis Spooner	Comedy	
1979	Will You Still Love Me in the Morning	Dennis Spooner	Sex comedy	
1982	All About Murder		Thriller	
1986	Sting in the Tale	Dennis Spooner	Drama	
1988	Holmes and the Ripper		Mystery	Based on the Whitechapel murders and Sherlock Holmes
1990	Anybody for Murder?	Dennis Spooner	Drama	
1993	Inside Job		Thriller	
2001	The Devil at Midnight		Thriller	
	Without Trace			
2006	Strictly Murder		Thriller	
2012	Murder Weapon		Thriller	

== Personal life ==
Clemens married his first wife Brenda Prior in 1955; they divorced in 1966. From 1967, he was with the actress Diane Enright, who was Diana Rigg's stand-in as Emma Peel during the 1965–1967 Avengers series. Enright died by suicide in 1976. He then married Janet Elizabeth with whom he had two sons; they stayed together until his death.

Clemens was appointed Officer of the Order of the British Empire (OBE) in the 2010 Birthday Honours.

== Death ==
Clemens died at home on 10 January 2015, aged 83. The cause of death was a leaking aneurysm. His son said his father had died shortly after watching an episode of The Avengers, and that his last words were: "I did quite a good job."
