= A Woman Possessed =

1958 British film by Max Varnel

- Directed by: Max Varnel
- Written by: Brian Clemens; Eldon Howard
- Produced by: Edward J. Danziger; Harry Lee Danziger
- Starring: Margaretta Scott; Francis Matthews; Kay Callard
- Cinematography: James Wilson (as Jimmy Wilson)
- Edited by: Maurice Rootes
- Music by: Edwin Astley; Albert Elms; Leon Young
- Production company: Danziger Productions
- Distributed by: United Artists Corporation (UK)
- Release date: August 1958 (UK)
- Running time: 68 minutes
- Country: United Kingdom
- Language: English

A Woman Possessed is a low budget 1958 British second feature ('B') drama film directed by Max Varnel and starring Margaretta Scott, Francis Matthews, and Kay Callard. It was written by Brian Clemens and Eldon Howard and produced by The Danzigers.

== Plot ==
John Winthrop, an English doctor, returns from a trip to America with his new fiancee, Ann. He is met with disapproval from his wealthy, domineering mother, Katherine, who is vocal in her dislike of Ann. On discovering Ann has a heart condition, Katherine insists the couple move in with her. One day the mother accidentally gives her daughter-in-law the wrong medication and Ann nearly dies. The doctor saves his wife, but then accuses his mother of attempted murder. In the end, it turns out Emma the maid was responsible for accidentally switching the pills, and with the crisis over, mother, son and daughter-in-law realise they must settle the differences between them.

== Cast ==
- Margaretta Scott as Katherine Winthrop
- Francis Matthews as John Winthrop
- Kay Callard as Ann
- Alison Leggatt as Emma
- Ian Fleming as Walter
- Jan Holden as Mary
- Tony Thawnton as Calvin
- Denis Shaw as Bishop
- Totti Truman Taylor as Miss Frobisher
- Edith Savile as Lady Harriett

== Critical reception ==
The Monthly Film Bulletin wrote: "Within its modest limits this film is crisply directed, well acted by the three main players, and intelligently presented. The family tensions and conflicts of loyalty are effectively suggested and the casebook situation is made to reveal character with some skill. The switch of blame from Katherine to Emma jars, however, and the optimistic ending shirks the implications of the story."

In British Sound Films: The Studio Years 1928–1959 David Quinlan rated the film as "average", writing: "Well-acted, but not-too-interesting drama."

TV Guide comments that "despite some good performances from the cast, this isn't a very engaging drama."
