= Varnel =

Varnel is a surname. Notable people with the surname include:

- Marcel Varnel (1892–1947), French film director
- Max Varnel (1925–1996), French-born Australian film and television director
