= Links of Justice =

1958 British film by Max Varnel

- Australian daybill poster
- Directed by: Max Varnel
- Written by: Brian Clemens
- Produced by: Edward J. Danziger; Harry Lee Danziger
- Starring: Jack Watling
- Cinematography: James Wilson
- Edited by: Maurice Rootes
- Music by: Leon Young; Albert Elms; Edwin Astley
- Production company: Danziger Productions Ltd
- Distributed by: Paramount British Pictures (UK)
- Release date: October 1958 (UK)
- Running time: 68 minutes
- Country: United Kingdom
- Language: English

Links of Justice is a 1958 British second feature ('B') film directed by Max Varnel and starring Jack Watling and Sarah Lawson. It was written by Brian Clemens and produced by The Danzigers.

== Plot ==
Edgar Mills and his mistress Stella, a failed actress, plot to murder Edgar's wealthy wife Clare. But Edgar ends up dead, his throat cut. Clare becomes prime suspect and is put on trial at the Old Bailey, but is able to prove she acted in self-defence when a burglar who witnessed the crime comes forward.

== Cast ==
- Jack Watling as Edgar Mills
- Sarah Lawson as Clare Mills
- Robert Raikes as Mr Averill QC, defence counsel
- Denis Shaw as Mr Heth QC, prosecuting counsel
- Kay Callard as Stella Mackie
- Geoffrey Hibbert as Edward Manning
- Totti Truman Taylor as Jemima Vance, theatrical costumier

== Critical reception ==
The Monthly Film Bulletin wrote: "With its flashback technique and parade of character cameos from the witnesses this second feature maintains average interest through its use of deft, if obvious structural tricks which it would be unfair to disclose. But it then overplays its hand by bringing in a further improbable coincidence. Direction and performances are efficient, but unexceptional."

Picturegoer wrote: "This well-reasoned thriller has Jack Watling as the perfect cad plotting to murder his perfect wife (Sarah Lawson) with the help of an imperfect floosie (Kay Callard). ... The story's told mostly in flashbacks and a bit too much courtroom procedure deflates the suspense. But the efficient acting – of Sarah Lawson, Jack Watling and the opposing barristers, Robert Raikes and Denis Shaw – plus a surprise ending make for serviceable entertainment."

In British Sound Films: The Studio Years 1928–1959 David Quinlan rated the film as "average", writing: "Thriller has some ingenuity; treatment is serviceable."

Allmovie wrote, "Chalk up another serviceable second-feature British melodrama for the production team of Edward and Harry Danzinger."
