= No Safety Ahead =

1959 British film by Max Varnel

- Directed by: Max Varnel
- Written by: Robert Hirst
- Produced by: Edward J. Danziger; Harry Lee Danziger
- Starring: James Kenney; Susan Beaumont
- Cinematography: James Wilson
- Edited by: Maurice Rootes
- Music by: Jack Gerber; Albert Elms (uncredited)
- Production company: Danziger Productions
- Distributed by: Paramount British Pictures (UK)
- Release date: May 1959 (UK)
- Running time: 68 minutes
- Country: United Kingdom
- Language: English

No Safety Ahead is a 1959 British film directed by Max Varnel and starring James Kenney and Susan Beaumont. It was written By Robert Hirst and produced by The Danzigers.

== Plot ==
Clem is a hard-up office clerk who unwillingly joins a gang planning a bank robbery. The heist ends in murder, and after running away he gives himself up.

== Cast ==
- James Kenney as Clem
- Susan Beaumont as Jean
- Denis Shaw as Inspector
- Gordon Needham as Richardson
- Tony Doonan as Don
- John Charlesworth as Jeff
- Brian Weske as Bill
- Robert Raglan as Langton
- Mark Singleton as Fordham
- Hal Osmond (uncredited)

== Critical reception ==
The Monthly Film Bulletin wrote: This laborious "crime does not pay" concoction neither holds nor convinces, and the sentimental conclusion leaves far too many loose ends dangling. The acting, too, seems very much at a loss."

Kine Weekly wrote: "Slipshod 'crime does not pay' melodrama. ... There are touches of religious sentiment, as well as conventional romance, but the trimmings fail to conceal the poverty of story material. It never convinces, let alone grips. ... The picture has many strings to its plot, including an aflaire between the bank manager's wife and one of her husband's clerks, but most are left dangling at the finish. Susan Beaumont is an appealing Jean, but James Kenney wins little sympathy as the foolish Clem, and Tony Doonan, Jolin Charlesworth and Brian Weske merely fill routine roles as Don, Jeff and Bill. The staging is not too bad, but whichever way you look at it the opus has nothing on TV."

Picturegoer wrote: "The young players work hard, but the script is so tired."

Picture Show wrote: "A modest production which has very little to commend it except perhaps exterior shots and an actionful climax.

In British Sound Films: The Studio Years 1928–1959 David Quinlan rated the film as "poor", writing: "Terrible; script is worst defender, with other departments almost equally guilty."
