= Hal Osmond =

British actor (1903–1959)

- Postcard
- Born: 27 May 1903; London, England
- Died: December 1959 (aged 56–57); Taunton, Somerset, England
- Occupation: Actor

Hal Osmond (27 May 1903 – December 1959) was a British stage, film and television actor. He played Anselm in The Adventures of Robin Hood episode "Errand of Mercy" (1956).

== Selected filmography ==
- Non-Stop New York (1937) – Ship Steward (uncredited)
- Old Mother Riley in Paris (1938) – Orderly (uncredited)
- The Rake's Progress (1945) – Corporal in Scout Car (uncredited)
- The Courtneys of Curzon Street (1947) – Fireman (uncredited)
- The Greed of William Hart (1948) – Hospital Porter (uncredited)
- Miranda (1948) – Railway Carman
- My Brother's Keeper (1948) – Ticket Clerk at Shorebury (uncredited)
- Quartet (1948) – Bookshop Assistant (segment "The Colonel's Lady")
- Here Come the Huggetts (1948) – 2nd. Engineer
- Once Upon a Dream (1949) – Bailiff
- Vote for Huggett (1949) – Fishmonger
- It's Not Cricket (1949) – Stage Manager
- A Boy, a Girl and a Bike (1949) – Mr. Bates
- Marry Me (1949) – Man in Restaurant
- Helter Skelter (1949) – Radio Sound-effects Man (uncredited)
- Diamond City (1949) – Brandy Bill
- The Spider and the Fly (1949) – Swiss Taxi Driver
- Your Witness (1950) – Taxi Driver
- Double Confession (1950) – Shooting Gallery Attendant
- Last Holiday (1950) – Trade Union Man
- Waterfront (1950) – Witness in Street
- Traveller's Joy (1950) – Lapp Cameraman (uncredited)
- No Trace (1950) – Taxi Driver
- There Is Another Sun (1951) – Mannock
- Hell Is Sold Out (1951) – Bookseller (uncredited)
- The Magic Box (1951) – Conductor's Manager (uncredited)
- Death of an Angel (1952) – Railway Porter
- The Happy Family (1952) – Shop Steward
- The Story of Robin Hood (1952) – Midge the Miller
- Stolen Face (1952) – Photographer
- The Brave Don't Cry (1952) – Sandy Mackenzie
- The Lost Hours (1952) – Garage attendant
- My Wife's Lodger (1952) – Man Sitting on Bench (uncredited)
- Top Secret (1952) – Jersey Waiter
- The Gambler and the Lady (1952) – Fred – Stable Groom
- Three Steps to the Gallows (1953) – Hotel Porter
- The Net (1953) – Agent Lawson
- Top of the Form (1953) – Barber (uncredited)
- The Steel Key (1953) – Taxi Driver
- The Oracle (1953) – Workman in White Apron (uncredited)
- The Sword and the Rose (1953) – Costermonger
- A Day to Remember (1953) – Large Lady's Husband (uncredited)
- Love in Pawn (1953) – Burglar
- The Dog and the Diamonds (1953) – Crook
- The Million Pound Note (1954) – Arthur
- Meet Mr. Malcolm (1954) – Joe – Cloakroom Attendant (uncredited)
- You Know What Sailors Are (1954) – Stores Petty Officer
- Fast and Loose (1954) – Man at car crash scene
- Forbidden Cargo (1954) – Baggage Room Clerk
- The Young Lovers (1954) – Detective at station and on train (uncredited)
- The Crowded Day (1954) – Liftman
- To Dorothy a Son (1954) – Livingstone Potts
- Tiger by the Tail (1954) – Electrical Inspector
- The Delavine Affair (1955) – Old Man
- The Gilded Cage (1955) – Hotel Porter (uncredited)
- Value for Money (1955) – Mr. Hall
- Simon and Laura (1955) – Effects Man
- No Smoking (1955) – Yokel
- Now and Forever (1956) – Gas Station Man (uncredited)
- Bond of Fear (1956) – Hospital Orderly
- Passport to Treason (1956) – Barman
- Eyewitness (1956) – Hospital Doorman (uncredited)
- It's A Wonderful World (1956) – Removal Man
- The Last Man to Hang (1956) – Coates: Member of the Jury
- Loser Takes All (1956) – Liftman (uncredited)
- Three Men in a Boat (1956) – Cabbie (Ext. J's House)
- The Big Money (1956) – Porter at Victoria Railway Station (uncredited)
- The Adventures of Robin Hood (1957) – Master Ricardo of Lincoln (episode "The Path of True Love")
- Town on Trial (1957) – Petrol Station Attendant (uncredited)
- Murder Reported (1957) – Porter
- Stranger in Town (1957) – Hotel Barman
- Hell Drivers (1957) – Station Ticket Clerk (uncredited)
- You Can't Escape (1957) – Poacher's Friend
- High Flight (1957) – Barman
- The Vicious Circle (1957) – Joe – Golf Caddy
- The Truth About Women (1957) – Baker
- Son of a Stranger (1957) - Barman
- Just My Luck (1957) – Hospital Visitor with Flowers (uncredited)
- The Depraved (1957) – Barman
- Carve Her Name With Pride (1958) – Bus Passenger (uncredited)
- Wonderful Things! (1958) – Angry Busker (uncredited)
- On the Run (1958) – Sam Bassett
- A Night to Remember (1958) – Steward (uncredited)
- Blood of the Vampire (1958) – Small Sneak Thief
- Tread Softly Stranger (1958) – Flatcap
- Links of Justice (1958) – (uncredited)
- The Great Van Robbery (1959) – Freddie
- The 39 Steps (1959) – Stage Manager
- Innocent Meeting (1959) – Shopkeeper
- Jack the Ripper (1959) – Snakey the Pickpocket
- No Safety Ahead (1959) – (uncredited)
- Web of Suspicion (1959) – Charlie
- Top Floor Girl (1959 – (uncredited)
- Crash Drive (1959) – Patient in Hospital
