= Top Floor Girl =

1959 British film by Max Varnel

- British theatrical poster
- Directed by: Max Varnel
- Written by: Brian Clemens; Eldon Howard
- Produced by: Edward J. Danziger; Harry Lee Danziger
- Starring: Kay Callard; Neil Hallett
- Cinematography: James Wilson
- Edited by: Lee Doig
- Music by: Albert Elms
- Production company: Danziger Productions
- Distributed by: Paramount British Pictures (UK)
- Release date: May 1959 (UK)
- Running time: 71 minutes
- Country: United Kingdom
- Language: English

Top Floor Girl is a 1959 British drama film directed by Max Varnel and starring Kay Callard, Neil Hallett and Robert Raikes. It was written by Brian Clemens and Eldon Howard and produced by The Danzigers.

== Plot ==
Connie is a ruthlessly ambitious woman who joins an advertising company as a clerk. To further her career she starts an affaire with a fellow worker. She later becomes involved with the son of a wealthy man, but begins to have regrets about abandoning her previous lover.

== Cast ==
- Kay Callard as Connie
- Neil Hallett as Dave
- Robert Raikes as Bob
- Maurice Kaufmann as Peter Farnite
- Brian Nissen as Stevens Jr.
- Diana Chesney as Miss Prentice
- Liz Fraser as Mabel
- Arnold Bell as Stevens Sr.
- William Hodge as Farnite Sr.
- Hal Osmond (uncredited)

== Critical reception ==
The Monthly Film Bulletin wrote: "A naive and artificial magazine romance with a comforting moral, capable enough on its own level. Kay Callard plays what is almost a solo piece with suitable efficiency, and there is an amusing character sketch by Elizabeth Fraser as a dim typist."

Picture Show wrote: "Rather unlikely tale but slickly told and adequately acted. Kay Callard plays an ambitious blonde who knows what she wants and isn't over-fastidious about how she gets it until true love comes along and brings out the best in her. Strictly for feminine audiences."

In British Sound Films: The Studio Years 1928–1959 David Quinlan rated the film as "mediocre", writing: "The old, old story – on a budget."
