= 1951 in television =

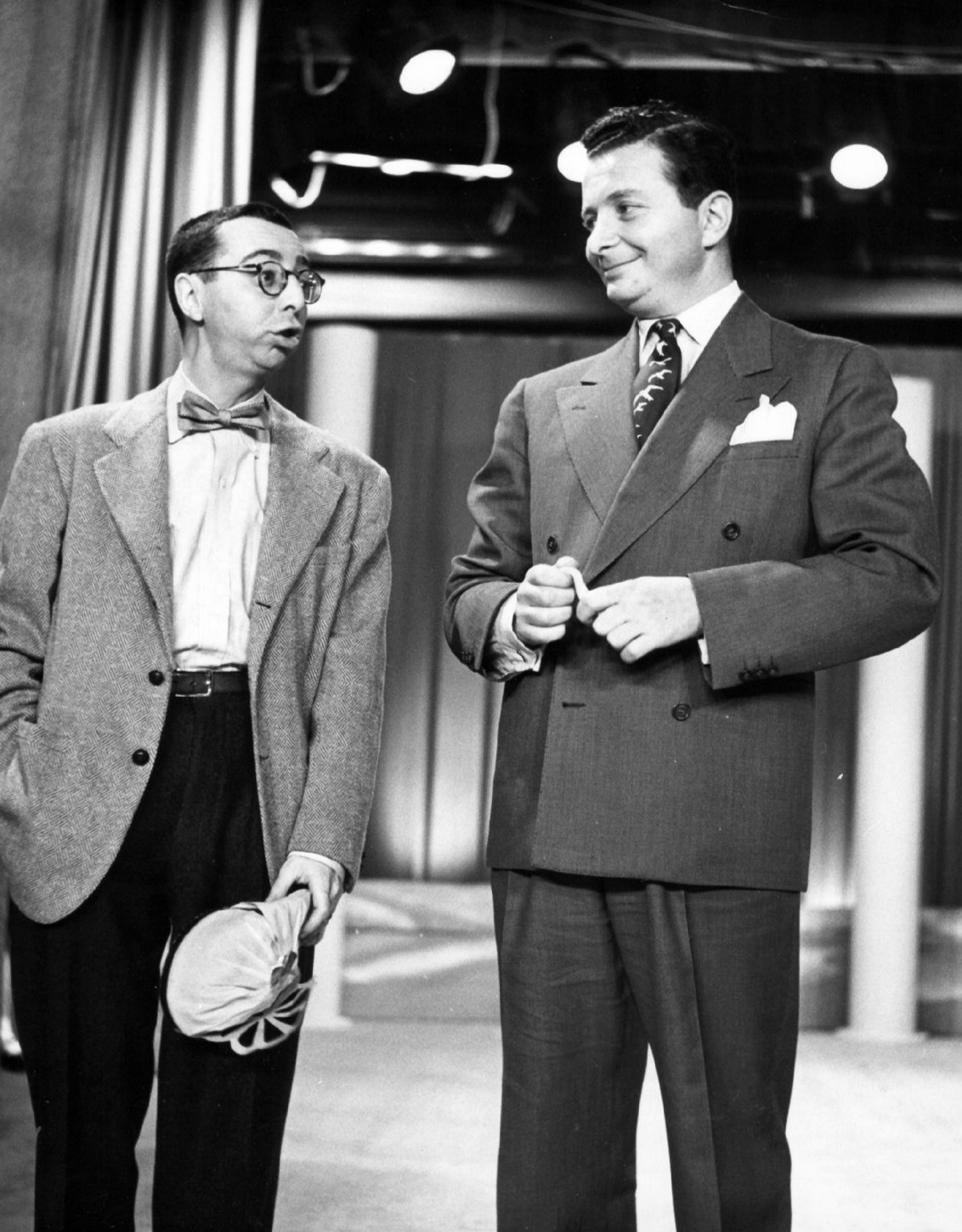

The year 1951 in television involved some significant events. Below is a list of television-related events during 1951.

== Events ==
- March 21 – XEW-TV began transmissions, being the second oldest in Mexico City, with the first one being XHTV.
- March 22 – RCA introduces an eight-pound (3.6 kg) monochrome television camera with a 53-pound (24 kg) backpack transmitter, both operated by batteries. It is the first portable television camera.
- May 28 – The US Supreme Court upholds the Federal Communications Commission's approval of the CBS color television system.
- May 31 – Nederlandse Televisie Stichting (NTS), as predecessor of Nederlandse Omroep Stichting Televisie (NOS), a first regular television broadcasting service started in Amsterdam, Netherlands.
- June 25 – CBS presents its first commercial color telecast featuring Arthur Godfrey, Ed Sullivan, and Faye Emerson.
- June – RCA demonstrates its new electronic color system.
- August 11 – The first baseball game is televised in color, a double-header between the Brooklyn Dodgers and the Boston Braves.
- September 4 – The first live transcontinental television broadcast occurs in San Francisco, California from the Japanese Peace Treaty Conference.
- September 29
  - The first live sporting event broadcast coast-to-coast, a college football game between Duke University and the University of Pittsburgh, is televised by NBC.
  - CBS broadcasts the first American football game in color, between the University of California and the University of Pennsylvania, at Philadelphia.
- September 30 – WXIA-TV signed on the air at 5 p.m., as WLTV on channel 8. It was the first full time ABC affiliate for Atlanta, taking it over from WSB-TV (channel 2) and WAGA-TV (channel 5).
- October 2
  - Danish language television station, DR TV, first launched in Copenhagen. The station broadcasts for one hour a day on Tuesdays, Wednesdays, Saturdays and Sundays in an initial phase.
  - NTS, The first television network in the Netherlands was launched at 8:15 pm.
- October 3 – The first live coast-to-coast network telecast of a World Series baseball game.
- October 12 – The Holme Moss transmitter is initiated in Northern England, making BBC Television available to the region for the first time.
- October 17 – Television broadcasts begin in Argentina from Primera Televisora Argentina on channel 7, Buenos Aires.
- October 20 – The CBS Eye logo makes its television debut.
- November 6 – Ukrainian Television commences regular broadcasts, becoming the second SSR in the USSR to introduce television.
- November 11 – Bing Crosby Enterprises demonstrates black-and-white video recording using a modified Ampex tape recorder.
- November 18 – Edward R. Murrow on See It Now presents a split screen view of the Brooklyn Bridge in New York City and the Bay Bridge in San Francisco. It has erroneously been referred to as the first live transcontinental telecast.
- December – TV Tupi in São Paulo (Brazil) begins broadcasting Sua Vida Me Pertence ("Your Life Belongs To Me") starring Vida Alves, pioneering the telenovela genre.
- December 24 – The first televised opera composed for television, Amahl and the Night Visitors by Gian Carlo Menotti, is broadcast by NBC.
- Ernie Kovacs' Time for Ernie and Ernie in Kovacsland television series premiere. Kovacs explores the boundaries of television technology with his use of camera tricks and special effects.

== Programs/programmes ==
| Series | Debut | Ended |
|---|---|---|
| Picture Page (UK) | October 8, 1936 | 1939 |
| Picture Page (UK) | 1946 | 1952 |
| The Voice of Firestone Televues | 1943 | 1947 |
| The Voice of Firestone Televues | 1949 | 1963 |
| Kaleidoscope (UK) | November 2, 1946 | 1953 |
| Gillette Cavalcade of Sports | November 8, 1946 | June 24, 1960 |
| Muffin the Mule (UK) | 1946 | 1955 |
| Kraft Television Theater | May 7, 1947 | 1958 |
| Kukla, Fran and Ollie | October 13, 1947 | 1957 |
| Meet the Press | November 6, 1947 | — |
| Howdy Doody | December 27, 1947 | September 24, 1960 |
| Café Continental | 1947 | 1953 |
| Juvenile Jury | 1947 | 1954 |
| Small Fry Club | 1947 | 1951 |
| Television Newsreel (UK) | January 5, 1948 | 1954 |
| The Original Amateur Hour | January 18, 1948 | September 27, 1970 |
| Court of Current Issues | February 9, 1948 | June 26, 1951 |
| Author Meets the Critics | April 1948 | October 10, 1954 |
| Hollywood Screen Test | April 15, 1948 | 1953 |
| Texaco Star Theater | June 8, 1948 | 1953 |
| The Ed Sullivan Show | June 20, 1948 | June 6, 1971 |
| Candid Camera | August 10, 1948 | May 23, 2004 |
| CBS Evening News | August 15, 1948 | — |
| Foodini the Great | August 23, 1948 | June 23, 1951 |
| Ford Theatre | October 17, 1948 | July 10, 1957 |
| The Alan Dale Show | 1948 | 1951 |
| Arthur Godfrey's Talent Scouts | 1948 | January 1, 1958 |
| Break the Bank | 1948 | 1957 |
| Celebrity Time | 1948 | September 1952 |
| Club Seven | 1948 | 1951 |
| The Philco Television Playhouse | 1948 | 1955 |
| Winner Take All | 1948 | 1952 |
| The Goldbergs | January 17, 1949 | 1956 |
| Captain Video | June 27, 1949 | April 1, 1955 |
| Mama | July 1, 1949 | March 17, 1957 |
| Martin Kane, Private Eye | August 7, 1949 | June 17, 1954 |
| The Lone Ranger | September 15, 1949 | June 6, 1957 |
| Come Dancing (UK) | September 29, 1949 | 1995 |
| The Aldrich Family | October 2, 1949 | May 29, 1953 |
| The Aldrich Family | January 2, 1953 | August 22, 1958 |
| The Ruggles | November 3, 1949 | June 19, 1952 |
| One Man's Family | November 4, 1949 | June 21, 1952 |
| One Man's Family | March 1, 1954 | April 1, 1955 |
| Arthur Godfrey and His Friends | 1949 | 1959 |

=== Debuts ===
- January 3 –
- January 8 - Say It with Acting, game show, on NBC.
- January 20 - Two Girls Named Smith, situation comedy, on ABC.
- March 3 – Watch Mr. Wizard on NBC (1951–1965)
- March 12 - Miss Susan, soap opera on NBC (1951)
- June 2 - The daytime version of A Date with Judy debuts on ABC.
- June 16 – Faye Emerson's Wonderful Town, variety show, with Faye Emerson and Skitch Henderson, on CBS
- July 1 - G. E. Guest House debuts on CBS.
- July 6 – Front Page Detective debuts on Dumont.
- July 14 - Assignment Manhunt debuts on NBC.
- July 16 – A British version of the What's My Line?, game show, on BBC (Like its American counterpart, it became one of the top-rated programs for the rest of the decade and made a celebrity of its host, Eamonn Andrews)
- August 3 - The Ad-Libbers, comedy sketch game show, on CBS. (1951)
- August 3 - Tales of Tomorrow, a science fiction anthology series on ABC (1951-1953)
- September 3 – The first long-running soap opera, Search for Tomorrow, on CBS (1951–1986)
- September 11 - The Bill Goodwin Show, a talk/variety program on NBC. (1951-1952)
- September 16- Sky King
- September 24 – Love of Life on CBS (1951–1980)
- October 15 – Situation comedy I Love Lucy, starring Lucille Ball with her real-life husband, Desi Arnaz, on CBS (1951–1957); produced on film in front of a studio audience, using three film cameras, instead of being broadcast live, and making Ball the world's first major female television star
- October 28 - Out There, a science fiction program on CBS (1951-1952)
- November 26 - [[]], musical variety series on NBC (1951-1953)
- December 14 – Dragnet, crime drama, on NBC (1951–1959 Series One B&W, 1967-1970 Series Two Color)
- Television version of Amos & Andy (1951–1953)
- The Roy Rogers Show (1951–1957), on NBC, starring Roy Rogers and his wife, Dale Evans
- Hallmark Hall of Fame (1951–present)

=== Ending during 1951 ===
| Date | Show | Debut |
|---|---|---|
| January 16 | The Alan Dale Show | 1948 |
| July 18 | Four Star Revue | Unknown |
| August 29 | Stars Over Hollywood | 1950 |
| October 13 | Two Girls Named Smith | 1951 |
| November 2 | Vanity Fair | 1948 |
| December 28 | Miss Susan | 1951 |
| Unknown | Club Seven | 1948 |

== Births ==
| Date | Name | Notability |
|---|---|---|
| January 7 | Helen Worth | English actress (Coronation Street) |
| January 12 | Kirstie Alley | Actress (Cheers, Veronica's Closet) (died 2022) |
| January 12 | Rush Limbaugh | Radio talk show host & commentator (died 2021) |
| January 15 | Charo | Actress, singer, guitarist |
| January 26 | Walt Willey | Actor |
| January 30 | Charles S. Dutton | Actor (Roc) |
| January 30 | Tim Sample | New England humorist |
| January 31 | Cristine Rose | Actress (Heroes) |
| February 12 | Susan Page | American journalist |
| February 13 | Ellen Bry | Actress (St. Elsewhere) |
| February 15 | Jane Seymour | English actress (Dr. Quinn, Medicine Woman) |
| February 16 | William Katt | Actor (The Greatest American Hero) |
| February 20 | John Voldstad | Actor (Newhart) |
| February 23 | Patricia Richardson | Actress (Home Improvement) |
| February 24 | Debra Jo Rupp | Actress (That '70s Show) |
| February 25 | James Brown | Sportcaster |
| March 12 | Caren Kaye | Actress |
| March 17 | Kurt Russell | Actor (The Travels of Jaimie McPheeters) |
| March 19 | Fred Berry | Actor (What's Happening!!) (died 2003) |
| April 13 | Peter Davison | Actor (Doctor Who) |
| April 20 | Luther Vandross | Singer (died 2005) |
| April 21 | Tony Danza | Actor (Taxi, Who's the Boss?) |
| April 27 | Paul O'Keefe | Actor (The Patty Duke Show) |
| April 29 | Ellen Crawford | Actress (ER) |
| April 29 | Dale Earnhardt | Professional NASCAR driver (died 2001) |
| May 8 | Deborah Harmon | Actress (Just the Ten of Us) |
| May 9 | Alley Mills | Actress (The Wonder Years) |
| May 15 | Fred Honsberger | American radio personality (died 2009) |
| May 16 | Laurette Spang-McCook | American actress |
| May 18 | Denny Dillon | Actress and comedian (Saturday Night Live, Dream On) |
| May 25 | Patti D'Arbanville | Actress (New York Undercover) |
| June 2 | Jeanine Pirro | Television host |
| June 3 | Jill Biden | Educator and former first lady of the United States |
| June 4 | Derek McGrath | Actor |
| June 5 | Ellen Foley | Singer and actress (Night Court) |
| June 5 | Christopher Kimball | Television host |
| June 5 | Mark Harelik | Television actor |
| June 13 | Richard Thomas | Actor (The Waltons) |
| June 17 | Joe Piscopo | Actor and comedian (Saturday Night Live) |
| June 20 | Tress MacNeille | Voice actress (Animaniacs, Chip 'n Dale: Rescue Rangers, Tiny Toon Adventures, Daisy Duck from Disney) |
| June 26 | Pamela Bellwood | Actress (Dynasty) |
| June 27 | Julia Duffy | Actress (Newhart) |
| June 29 | Craig Sager | American sports reporter (died 2016) |
| July 7 | Roz Ryan | Actress (Amen, The Marvelous Misadventures of Flapjack) |
| July 9 | Chris Cooper | Actor |
| July 10 | Phyllis Smith | Actress (The Office) |
| July 12 | Cheryl Ladd | Actress (Charlie's Angels) |
| July 12 | Jamey Sheridan | Actor (Homeland) |
| July 13 | Didi Conn | Actress |
| July 15 | Jesse Ventura | Actor |
| July 17 | Lucie Arnaz | Actress (Here's Lucy), daughter of Lucille Ball and Desi Arnaz |
| July 19 | Debra Byrd | Vocal coach (American Idol, Canadian Idol, The Voice) (died 2024) |
| July 21 | Robin Williams | Actor and comedian (Mork & Mindy) (died 2014) |
| July 21 | K. T. McFarland | American political candidate |
| July 24 | Lynda Carter | Actress (Wonder Woman) |
| July 31 | Barry Van Dyke | Actor (Airwolf, Diagnosis: Murder), son of Dick Van Dyke |
| August 3 | Jay North | Actor (Dennis the Menace) |
| August 5 | Chip Fields | Actress (Good Times) |
| August 6 | Catherine Hicks | Actress (Annie Camden on 7th Heaven) |
| August 14 | Carl Lumbly | Actor (Cagney & Lacey, Alias, Justice League) |
| August 14 | Kyle Johnson | Actor |
| August 17 | Robert Joy | Canadian actor (CSI: NY) |
| August 19 | Randi Oakes | Actress and model (CHiPs) |
| August 21 | Harry Smith | American television journalist |
| August 26 | Bill Whitaker | American television journalist |
| September 2 | Mark Harmon | Actor (NCIS) |
| September 4 | Judith Ivey | Actress |
| September 5 | Michael Keaton | Actor |
| September 8 | Jeffrey Lurie | Producer |
| September 9 | Tom Wopat | Actor (The Dukes of Hazzard) |
| September 10 | Gary Danielson | Football player |
| September 12 | Joe Pantoliano | Actor |
| September 13 | Jean Smart | Actress (Designing Women, Kim Possible) |
| September 16 | Janet Andrewartha | Australian actress (Neighbours) (died 2024) |
| September 23 | Ron Klink | American television broadcaster |
| September 25 | Mark Hamill | Actor (Batman: The Animated Series, Time Squad, Teamo Supremo, Codename: Kids Next Door, Danny Phantom, Super Robot Monkey Team Hyperforce Go!, Avatar: The Last Airbender, My Friends Tigger & Pooh, Regular Show) |
| October 2 | Sting | English singer |
| October 18 | Pam Dawber | Actress (Mork & Mindy) |
| October 30 | Harry Hamlin | Actor (L.A. Law) |
| November 6 | Nigel Havers | English actor |
| November 9 | Lou Ferrigno | Actor (The Incredible Hulk) |
| November 16 | Miguel Sandoval | Actor (Medium, Station 19, Jackie Chan Adventures) |
| November 17 | Stephen Root | Actor (NewsRadio, King of the Hill, The X's, Adventure Time, Gravity Falls) |
| November 20 | Rodger Bumpass | Voice actor (SpongeBob SquarePants, Where on Earth Is Carmen Sandiego?, Invader Zim) |
| December 1 | Treat Williams | Actor (Everwood) (died 2023) |
| December 4 | Patricia Wettig | Actress (thirtysomething, Brothers & Sisters) |
| December 5 | Morgan Brittany | Actress (Dallas) |
| December 14 | Celia Weston | Actress |

== Television debuts ==
- Rico Alaniz – The Adventures of Kit Carson
- Mel Brooks – The Milton Berle Show
- Raymond Burr – Stars Over Hollywood
- Joseph Calleia – Pulitzer Prize Playhouse
- Wendell Corey – Schlitz Playhouse of Stars
- Robert Coote – Robert Montgomery Presents
- James Fox – Parent-Craft
- Ben Gazzara – Danger
- Stacy Harris – Chesterfield Sound Off Time
- Pat Hingle – Suspense
- Rochelle Hudson – Racket Squad
- Barry Kelley – Stars Over Hollywood
- Don Knotts – Search for Tomorrow
- Robert Loggia – Search for Tomorrow
- Vera Miles – Fireside Theatre
- Elizabeth Montgomery – Robert Montgomery Presents
- Alvy Moore – Space Patrol
- Kathleen O'Malley – The George Burns and Gracie Allen Show
- Joan Plowright – Sara Crewe
- Denver Pyle – The Cisco Kid
- Lee Remick – Armstrong Circle Theatre
- George C. Scott – The Bigelow Theatre
- Lois Smith – Love of Life
- Charles Starrett – Faith Baldwin Romance Theatre
- Jan Sterling – Pulitzer Prize Playhouse
- Jack Weston – Out There
