= The Great Van Robbery =

1959 British film by Max Varnel

- Directed by: Max Varnel
- Written by: Brian Clemens; Eldon Howard
- Produced by: Edward J. Danziger; Harry Lee Danziger
- Starring: Denis Shaw; Kay Callard
- Cinematography: James Wilson (as Jimmy Wilson)
- Edited by: Maurice Rootes
- Music by: Albert Elms (uncredited)
- Production company: Danziger Productions
- Distributed by: United Artists (US)
- Release dates: January 1959 (UK); 1963 (US)
- Running time: 71 minutes
- Country: United Kingdom
- Language: English

The Great Van Robbery is a 1959 black-and-white British crime film starring Denis Shaw and Kay Callard, directed by Max Varnel. It was written by Brian Clemens and Eldon Howard and produced by The Danzigers.

== Plot ==
Scotland Yard teams up with Interpol to discover the origins of stolen money in a private bank account in Rio de Janeiro. Assigning their best detective Caesar Smith to the case, the money is soon traced to a robbery from a Royal Mint van. Investigations lead to a coffee storehouse where a worker is found murdered and the remaining loot discovered.

== Cast ==
- Denis Shaw as Caesar Smith
- Kay Callard as Ella
- Tony Quinn as Mercer
- Philip Saville as Cartier
- Vera Fusek as Mara
- Tony Doonan as Wally
- Bob Simmons as Peters
- Geoffrey Hibbert as Venner
- Gordon Sterne as Robledo
- Carl Duering as Delgano
- Guido Lorraine as Leprave
- June Rodney as Julie
- Hal Osmond as Freddie
- Brian Weske as Francey
- Carl Conway as Bart
- Michael Bell as Garfield
- Jacques Cey as Workman
- Julian Orchard as Brady
- Robert Raglan as Surgeon
- Peter Allenby as Bank Manager
- Paul Stassino as Toni
- Peter Elliott as Feenan.

== Production ==
The film's camera operator was future director Nicolas Roeg (credited as Nick Roeg).

== Reception ==
The Monthly Film Bulletin wrote: "Though basically routine in plot and substance, this lively crime thriller has the particular advantage of a freshly observed hero in Caesar Smith, convincingly played by Denis Shaw as a heavily built but agile Scotland Yard man with a dexterous line in judo."

Boxoffice said: "Denis Shaw is the hero, ever resolute and resourceful – and upon his fast-stepping form the film's dramatic intensity rests. The audience for which it's designed will be happy."

In British Sound Films David Quinlan says: "Routine crooks' tour with an unusual hero."

Franz Antony Clinton writes in British Thrillers, 1950–1979: "In one of the better Danzinger brothers B movies, The Great Van Robbery features a bright script and efficient direction that keeps things moving at a brisk pace."

In The British 'B' Film Chibnall & McFarlane write: "Nicolas Roeg's camerwork brought some distinction to The Great Van Robbery."
