= Bartlett Mullins =

British actor (1904–1992)

- Born: William Bartley Mullin; 13 August 1904; Crosby, Lancashire, England
- Died: 15 May 1992 (aged 87); Devon, England
- Occupation: Actor

Bartlett Mullins (13 August 1904 – 15 May 1992) was a British actor.

== Career ==
He is best remembered by British TV viewers as Mr Clough "Cloughie", Bob and Terry's workmate in the sitcom The Likely Lads. He also appeared on episodes of Z-Cars, Danger Man, Maigret, The Saint, Dixon of Dock Green, Doctor Who (in the serial The Sensorites), Adam Adamant Lives!, The Prisoner, On the Buses, Steptoe and Son, Secret Army and Worzel Gummidge.

His stage work included Dorothy L. Sayers The Zeal of Thy House at London's Garrick Theatre in 1938; and Sacha Guitry's Don't Listen, Ladies at the Booth Theatre on Broadway in 1948–49. He appeared in the West End in 1952 in Hanging Judge by Raymond Massey.

== Selected filmography ==
=== Film ===
- Dancing with Crime (1947) - Club Barman (uncredited)
- Daughter of Darkness (1948) - Irish Shopkeeper (uncredited)
- The Three Weird Sisters (1948) - Dispenser
- No Room at the Inn (1948) - Councillor Medlicott (uncredited)
- The Case of Charles Peace (1949) - Mr. Brion
- Gone to Earth (1950) - Chapel elder, dress shop owner
- Ha'penny Breeze (1950) - Windy (uncredited)
- Stolen Face (1952) - 3rd Farmer (uncredited)
- The Wild Heart (1952) - Chapel elder
- Wheel of Fate (1953)
- Eight O'Clock Walk (1954) - Hargreaves
- Conflict of Wings (1954) - Soapy
- The Green Carnation (1954) - Gallery official
- To Dorothy a Son (1954) - Mechanic (uncredited)
- The Red Dress (1954) - Swann (segment "Panic' story)
- Track the Man Down (1955) - Chief clerk (uncredited)
- The Quatermass Xperiment (1955) - Zookeeper (uncredited)
- A Time to Kill (1955) - Coroner (uncredited)
- The Curse of Frankenstein (1957) - Tramp (uncredited)
- Robbery Under Arms (1958) - Paddy, town drunk
- Innocent Sinners (1958) - Dwight (uncredited)
- The Adventures of Hal 5 (1958) - Ben
- Sapphire (1959) - Newsagent (uncredited)
- Peeping Tom (1960) - Mr. Peters - News Agent Shop Owner (uncredited)
- Saturday Night and Sunday Morning (1960) - Waiter (uncredited)
- Edgar Wallace Mysteries (Episode: 'Solo for Sparrow') - (1962) - Mr. Walters
- Rasputin the Mad Monk (1966) - Waggoner (uncredited)
- The Sandwich Man (1966) - George Pocket
- Frankenstein Created Woman (1967) - Bystander
- River Rivals
- Half a Sixpence (1967) - Carshott
- The Mini-Affair (1967) - Joke Shop Salesman
- A Nice Girl Like Me (1969) - Male Basket Weaver
- Trog (1970) - Butcher (uncredited)
- Sex and the Other Woman (1972) - Henry
- Tales from the Crypt (1972) - First Blind Man (segment 5 "Blind Alleys") (uncredited)
- The Changes (1975) - Old Man with Cats

=== Television ===
- The Diary of Samuel Pepys (1958) – Uncle Wight
- His and Hers (1970) – Mr. Jones
