= Moment of Indiscretion =

1958 British film by Max Varnel

- British quad poster
- Directed by: Max Varnel
- Written by: Brian Clemens; Eldon Howard
- Produced by: Edward J. Danziger; Harry Lee Danziger
- Starring: Ronald Howard; Lana Morris
- Cinematography: James Wilson; Nicolas Roeg (camera operator)
- Music by: Edwin Astley; Albert Elms; Leon Young
- Production company: Danziger Productions
- Distributed by: United Artists Corporation (UK)
- Release date: September 1958
- Running time: 71 minutes
- Country: United Kingdom
- Language: English

Moment of Indiscretion is a low budget 1958 British second feature ('B') crime film directed by Max Varnel and starring Ronald Howard and Lana Morris. It was written by Brian Clemens and Eldon Howard and produced by The Danzigers.

== Plot ==
Janet Miller has been happily married to her barrister husband John for two years. Janet's former fiancé Brian contacts her, asking her to meet him at the flat of his friend Corby, who is absent. Though her intentions are mostly nostalgic and harmless, she keeps the meeting a secret from her husband to avoid unnecessary friction. Brian tells her he wanted to see her once more before departing for South America, probably forever.

After Brian has gone, Janet leaves the apartment and witnesses a man stab and murder a woman at the door of her lower-floor flat. The murderer escapes and Janet bends down to examine the body, dropping her handkerchief. Finding herself in a position compromised by not having told John she was meeting a former boyfriend, she decides to leave and not contact the police. However, she is seen by another tenant.

The police trace Janet through her handkerchief and question her in front of her husband. At first, she is evasive and unable to account for her movements. She eventually admits that she was at the building and witnessed the murder. However, she does not reveal the full details; the police become suspicious and arrest her for murder. John decides to investigate on his own by tracking down the real killer.

== Cast ==
- Ronald Howard as John Miller
- Lana Morris as Janet Miller
- John Stone as Eric Stanton
- Denis Shaw as Inspector Marsh
- Piers Keelan as Detective Sergeant Field
- John Witty as Brian
- John Van Eyssen as Corby
- Ann Lynn as Pauline
- Totti Truman Taylor as Mrs. Cartier
- Robert Dorning as Mr. Evans
- Mark Singleton as the jeweller
- Judy Bruce as Vicki

== Critical reception ==
The Monthly Film Bulletin wrote: "This low-budget thriller lacks all conviction and vitality, and the valiant acting of the cast is unable to overcome the handicap of a feeble script. Direction makes no attempt to compensate for the deficiencies of the material, but is otherwise adequate to the demands of unambitious second feature production."

Picturegoer wrote: "As an argument against deceiving your husband, this inept thriller may have some value.... It rates one star for its few suspenseful moments."

Picture Show called the film a "well acted and directed drama."

In British Sound Films: The Studio Years 1928–1959 David Quinlan rated the film as "poor", writing: "Inept thriller, passably acted but weakly written."
