= Lambert Williamson =

British film composer (1907–1975)

- Born: 28 April 1907; Cleethorpes, Lincolnshire, United Kingdom
- Died: 13 November 1975 (aged 68); Beaconsfield, Buckinghamshire, United Kingdom
- Occupations: Composer, Conductor
- Years active: 1936–1969 (film)

William Lambert Williamson (28 April 1907– 13 November 1975) was a British composer and conductor, best known for his scores for films, short documentaries and light music.

He was born at 14 Lindum Road, Cleethorpes, Lincolnshire, the son of a doctor. Williamson studied engineering at Leeds University, where he was musical director of the revue Varsity Vanities in November 1931. He took his diploma in June 1932. He married Constance Haigh, a schoolteacher, in Huddersfield on 24 July 1933. Before the war he was a pianist with the Jack Hylton band.

During the late 1940s he worked for the Rank Organisation. He composed many scores for British films in the 1940s and 1950s, short information and documentary films for the Crown Film Unit and others, and acted as conductor and musical director on films scored by other composers, including Georges Auric's Moulin Rouge, Heaven Knows, The Innocents and Bonjour Tristesse, Roman Vlad's Romeo and Juliet, Franco Mannino's Beat the Devil and Mario Nascimbene's Room at the Top.

Light music concert works, including the overtures Curtain Up and This is the Business, were recorded by Sidney Torch with the Queen's Hall Light Orchestra in the late 1940s. In February 1951 Williamson composed Living Silence, a choral and speaking choir morality tale for Liverpool Cathedral, setting a text by Patric Dickinson and broadcast on the Third Programme. Williamson regularly composed for BBC radio productions in the late 1940s and into the 1950s: his Rivers of the North of England, composed for the BBC Music Library in 1950, was used as the theme tune for Eric Simms' Countryside programme in 1952. For the 'Mammoth Concert of Comic Music', held at the Royal Albert Hall on 17 July 1958 he contributed a Concertino for piano tuner and orchestra.

Williamson, who first worked with Charlie Chaplin on the music for the film A Countess from Hong Kong in 1967, was the arranger of Chaplin's new score for the re-released edition of The Circus in 1969. The score was restored for live orchestral screenings by Timothy Brock in 2003.

He died in Buckinghamshire in November 1975, aged 68.

== Selected filmography ==
- Excuse My Glove (1936)
- The Edge of the World (1937)
- The End of the River (1947)
- One Night with You (1948)
- Woman Hater (1948)
- Good-Time Girl (1948)
- Cardboard Cavalier (1949)
- Don't Ever Leave Me (1949)
- They Were Not Divided (1950)
- Green Grow the Rushes (1951)
- Stryker of the Yard (1953)
- Cosh Boy (1953)
- Beat the Devil (1953)
- The Good Die Young (1954)
- Forbidden Cargo (1954)
- To Dorothy a Son (1954)
- The Green Carnation (1954)
- Secret Venture (1955)
- Track the Man Down (1955)
- Abdulla the Great (1955)
- Cross Channel (1955)
- Dry Rot (1956)
- Sailor Beware! (1956)
- The Story of Esther Costello (1957)
- The Spaniard's Curse (1958)
- This Other Eden (1959)
- The Innocents (1961)
- The Adding Machine (1969)

Documentary shorts

- Moving Millions (Crown Film Unit, 1947)
- Men of the World (Crown Film Unit, 1950)
- Fire at Duckham (Petroleum Films Bureau, 1954)
