= Susan Beaumont =

English actress (1936–2020)

- Born: 26 February 1936; London, England
- Died: 25 February 2020 (aged 83)
- Occupation: Film actress
- Years active: 1955–1959

Susan Beaumont (26 February 1936 – 25 February 2020) was an English film actress who enjoyed a relatively brief film career.

== Family ==
Susan Beaumont was born (as Susan Anna Black) in London. She was the daughter of musical comedy actress Roma Beaumont and producer/impresario Alfred Black, as well as the granddaughter of the producer/impresario George Black).

== Career ==
Beaumont attended RADA, but after only one term she left and found a job in a pantomime. She went on to dance for Norman Wisdom at the London Palladium and in the musical Limelight. She became a Rank contractee at nineteen and starred as a leading lady in several films between 1956 and 1959, including Eyewitness, The Spaniard's Curse, No Safety Ahead and Man of the Moment. She appeared in Carry On Nurse as Nurse Frances James.

== Selected filmography ==
- Simon and Laura (1955)
- Jumping for Joy (1956)
- Eyewitness (1956)
- High Tide at Noon (1957)
- Innocent Sinners (1958)
- The Spaniard's Curse (1958)
- On the Run (1958)
- The Man Who Liked Funerals (1959)
- Carry On Nurse (1959)
- Web of Suspicion (1959)
- No Safety Ahead (1959)
