= A Weekend with Lulu =

1961 British film by John Paddy Carstairs

- Directed by: John Paddy Carstairs
- Screenplay by: Ted Lloyd
- Story by: Ted Lloyd; Val Valentine
- Produced by: Michael Carreras(executive producer); Ted Lloyd
- Starring: Bob Monkhouse; Leslie Phillips; Alfred Marks; Shirley Eaton; Irene Handl
- Cinematography: Ken Hodges
- Edited by: James Needs; Tom Simpson
- Music by: Russ Conway
- Color process: Black and white
- Production company: Hammer Film Productions
- Distributed by: Columbia Pictures
- Release dates: 10 April 1961 (United Kingdom); 1 November 1961 (United States)
- Running time: 89 minutes (UK); 91 minutes (US)
- Country: United Kingdom
- Language: English

A Weekend with Lulu is a 1961 British comedy film directed by John Paddy Carstairs, produced by Michael Carreras and Ted Lloyd and starring Bob Monkhouse, Leslie Phillips, Alfred Marks, Shirley Eaton and Irene Handl. The screenplay was by Ted Lloyd. Brian Wert and Ken Hodges were the camera operators, John Howell was art director and Chris Sutton was assistant director. The film was filmed from 6 October 1960 through 10 December 1960. It opened in Halifax on 10 April 1961, to good business. The British print ran two minutes shorter than the American release print.

== Plot ==
Young couple Timothy and Deirdre plan a romantic weekend on the coast in a caravan, called "Lulu", owned by the brother of their pal Fred and which Fred will tow with his ice cream van, as he will be working selling ice cream over the weekend. When Deirdre's mother insists on going along as her daughter's chaperone, Timothy's plans are somewhat compromised. Then a train ferry mix-up lands the holidaymakers deep in France without passports or money. As they try to get back to England, they encounter a variety of problems, and end up being pursued across country by the French police.

They end at the Chateau de Chant Claire where the Comte shows his wine cellars.

They discover they can fly out from Trouville for £25 but need to raise the cash. Fred takes bets in a local bar on the local leg of the Tour de France. Fred steals the stake money and they run off pursued by locals.

However a French motorcycle cop mistakes the ice cream van and escorts them to the airport and they escape.

== Cast ==
- Bob Monkhouse as Fred Scrutton
- Leslie Phillips as Timothy Gray
- Alfred Marks as Comte de Grenoble
- Shirley Eaton as Deirdre Proudfoot
- Irene Handl as Florence Bell
- Sid James as café patron
- Kenneth Connor as British tourist
- Sydney Tafler as stationmaster
- Eugene Deckers as Inspector Larue
- Graham Stark as French policeman, Chiron
- Tutte Lemkow as Postman Léon
- Judith Furse as Madame Bon-Bon the brothel owner
- Denis Shaw as Bar Patron
- Russ Conway as French pianist

== Critical reception ==
The Monthly Film Bulletin wrote: "Despite an abundance of those caricatures of Frenchmen that say less about behaviour across the Channel than about the subconscious of people on this side of it, here is another rowdy episodic British farce, essaying the patterns that have generally proved money-making in the past. In a wasteland of tired leering humour, only Graham Stark's zany miming and Irene Handl's tottering gentility stand out."

Britmovie called the film a "Breezy farce spiced with Gallic wisecracks...Bob Monkhouse, Leslie Phillips and Alfred Marks play off each other energetically, whilst Irene Handl is wonderful as the interfering busybody."

TV Guide gave it two out of four stars, calling it "An enjoyable comedy."
