= Forbidden Cargo (1954 film) =

1954 film

- Directed by: Harold French
- Written by: Sydney Box
- Produced by: Sydney Box; Earl St. John
- Starring: Nigel Patrick; Elizabeth Sellars; Terence Morgan; Greta Gynt; Jack Warner
- Cinematography: C. M. Pennington-Richards
- Edited by: Anne V. Coates
- Music by: Lambert Williamson
- Production company: London Independent Producers
- Distributed by: General Film Distributors
- Release date: 4 May 1954
- Running time: 85 minutes
- Country: United Kingdom
- Language: English
- Budget: £155,000

Forbidden Cargo is a 1954 British crime film directed by Harold French and starring Nigel Patrick, Elizabeth Sellars and Jack Warner. It was written by Sydney Box.

== Plot ==
A customs officer captures a gang of drugs smugglers, assisted by a birdwatcher.

== Cast ==
- Nigel Patrick as Inspector Michael Kenyon
- Elizabeth Sellars as Rita Compton
- Terence Morgan as Roger Compton
- Greta Gynt as Madame Simonetta
- Jack Warner as Major Alec White
- Theodore Bikel as Max
- Joyce Grenfell as Lady Flavia Queensway
- James Gilbert as Agent Larkins
- Eric Pohlmann as Steven Lasovich
- Martin Boddey as Sub-Director Holt
- Michael Hordern as Director of Customs
- Jacques B. Brunius as Det. Pierre Valance
- Ronald Adam as Mr. Bennett
- Ballard Berkeley as Cooper
- Campbell Gray as Luigi
- Campbell Singer as Sergeant Dodson, River Police
- Hal Osmond as baggage room clerk
- Philip Stainton as Seaburyness police sergeant
- Brian Wilde as Seaburyness smuggler
- Campbell Singer as River police sergeant
- Tom Gill as hotel receptionist
- Jill Adams as Michael's dance partner
- Roger Maxwell as bird sanctuary spokesman
- Nicholas Phipps as Royal Navy information officer
- Denis Shaw as ship's cook
- Lloyd Lamble as captain of Python
- Cyril Chamberlain as Customs officer
- John Arnatt as Customs officer
- John Horsley as Customs officer
- Arnold Diamond as French Customs officer

== Production ==
The film was shot at Pinewood Studios with sets designed by the art director John Howell. Location shooting took place in London and Cannes.

Anne Cotes recalled that when Harold French had finished the film he left to go to his house in France, and Bob McNaught and Cotes devised a new ending, which both directed, a scene on the Thames; "We kept a guy alive who died in the original". She said French had nothing to do with this – "He had delivered the film the way he liked it, and the fact that Sydney didn't like it and nobody liked it, it didn't work, he didn't really seem too concerned about."

== Critical reception ==
The Monthly Film Bulletin wrote: "Made to a familiar pattern, this thriller wavers between a semi-documentary account of Customs methods and such melodramatic excitements as the final car chase. The script develops little tension – the story is somewhat haphazardly constructed – and direction and playing are only fair. Joyce Grenfell is incongruously introduced in the early scenes to provide a caricature of an eccentric and devoted bird watcher."

Leonard Maltin noted a "Modest drama," which was "enlivened by a solid cast"; British Pictures noted a "Nice cast, but dreary story";

Kine Weekly said "Polished and exciting melodrama. Semi-documentary in approach, it illustrates a hectic chapter in an eager official's notebook. Its script is far from taut, but, although it sprawls a bit, its surface action is never dull and its climax packs a mighty wallop. Moreover, the cast is, with few exceptions, first class, and no expense has been spared to create correct and colourful atmosphere. Definitely grand value for the masses and youngsters."

Variety said "Direction is neatly tuned to the suspense note established in the screenplay and there is enough action to sustain the plot. There is an allround thesping standard with Nigel Patrick effectively portraying the customs sleuth and Jack Warner doing reliable work as his immediate boss. Elizabeth Sellars and Terence Morgan, as brother and sister play their roles adequately. Joyce Grenfell contributes another of her characteristic gems as a titled bird-watcher who provides the first clue."

Allmovie wrote, "Apart from the always delightful Joyce Grenfell, Forbidden Cargo is humorless Dragnet material transplanted to the high seas";

Sky Cinema noted a "workmanlike British thriller from the Fifties, directed by Harold French, has a documentary feel, with some crisp dialogue by Sydney Box. The suave Nigel Patrick stars as the customs investigator alerted to nefarious coastal activities by none other than the wonderful Joyce Grenfell. She is cast as an aristocratic birdwatcher who is most put out that a suspicious landing craft should disturb her nesting birds. Other stalwarts appearing include Elizabeth Sellars and Terence Morgan as brother-and-sister smugglers, Jack Warner, Greta Gynt, Michael Hordern and Eric Pohlmann, particularly good as a Polish racketeer. A pleasing period piece."

The Radio Times Guide to Films gave the film 2/5 stars, writing: "Customs agent Nigel Patrick tries to stop drug smugglers from polluting our shores in this cosy but rather unexciting thriller. Patrick is supported by a cast of British stalwarts that includes Joyce Grenfell (as a bird-watcher named Lady Flavia Queensway), Elizabeth Sellars, Jack Warner and Terence Morgan."

In British Sound Films: The Studio Years 1928–1959 David Quinlan rated the film as "average", writing: "Not-too-interesting story falls between documentary and thriller."

Editor Anne Coates called it "not a great film".
