= Gabrielle Brune =

British actress (1912–2005)

- 1939 Spotlight photo
- Born: Gabrielle Hudson; 12 February 1912; Bournemouth, Hampshire, England
- Died: 18 January 2005 (aged 92); Chichester, Sussex, England
- Occupation: Actress

Gabrielle Brune (12 February 1912 in Bournemouth, Hampshire – 18 January 2005 in Chichester, Sussex) was a British actress.

== Career ==
On stage from 1930, her work included appearances in cabaret, the West End, on Broadway, in films and on television.

== Personal life ==
Gabrielle Brune was born Gabrielle Hudson, the only child of Thomas Habgood Hudson and Adrienne Brune; both parents were theatre professionals from Australia. Her mother was an actress and singer. She used her mother's surname professionally.

In 1941, she was reported to be recovering from appendicitis and double pneumonia in a river house at Datchet on the Thames.

== Marriages ==
In 1938, Brune was described as "Mrs. G. M. Thompson, wife of an English actor" in a news report about her first professional trip to America: (NB: Raymond Francis). In 1942, she married an American Army officer, Maj. Walter J. Currie, in London.

She died on 18 January 2005, at the age of 92.

== Selected filmography ==
- Red Pearls (1930)
- The Penny Pool (1937)
- The Wife of General Ling (1937)
- Garrison Follies (1940)
- He Found a Star (1941)
- Tomorrow We Live (1943)
- A Run for Your Money (1949)
- Mandy (1952)
- Hot Ice (1952)
- The Wedding of Lilli Marlene (1953)
- The Titfield Thunderbolt (1953)
- Three Steps to the Gallows (1953)
- The Harassed Hero (1954)
- Touch and Go (1955)
- Fun at St. Fanny's (1956)
- Girl in the Headlines (1963)
