= Robert Raglan =

English actor (1909–1985)

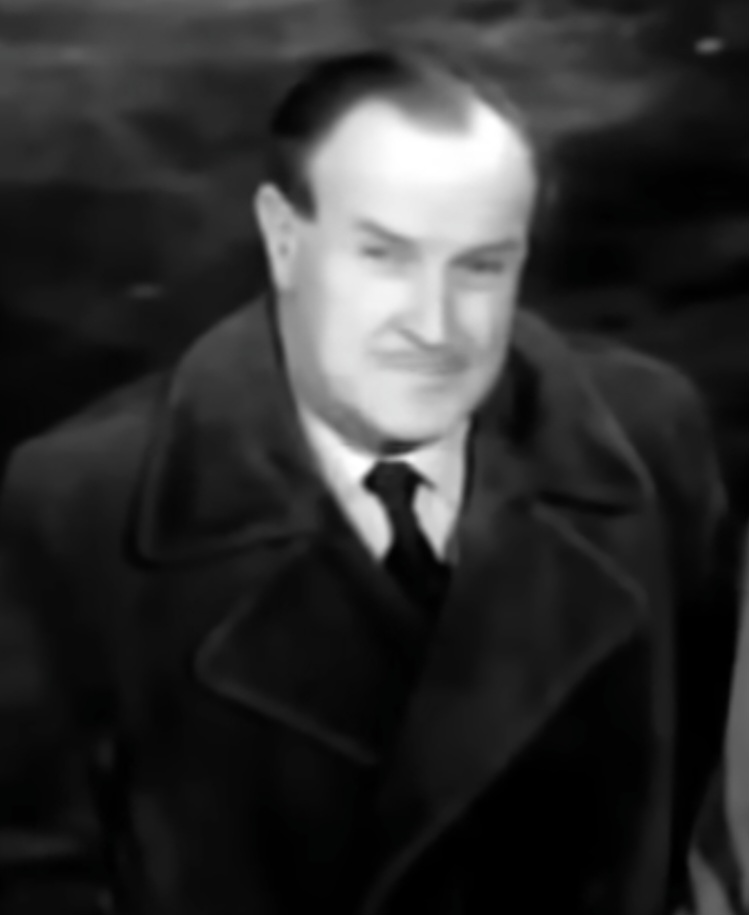
- Raglan in an episode of One Step Beyond (1961)
- Born: 7 April 1909; Reigate, Surrey, England
- Died: 18 July 1985 (aged 76); Wandsworth, London, England
- Years active: 1946-1983

Robert Raglan (7 April 1909 – 18 July 1985) was a British actor best known for his semi-regular role in Dad's Army as Colonel Pritchard. He also starred in a number of other television series and films such as Fabian of the Yard (1954–56) and The Haunted House of Horror (1969). He also appeared in Danger Man with Patrick McGoohan, and Scotland Yard.

== Partial filmography ==
- The Courtneys of Curzon Street (1947) - (uncredited)
- Circus Boy (1947) - Trevor
- Night Beat (1947) - Det. Sgt (uncredited)
- The Ringer (1952) - (uncredited)
- The Broken Horseshoe (1953) - (uncredited)
- Recoil (1953) - Sgt Perkins
- The Good Beginning (1953) - Shelley (uncredited)
- Gilbert Harding Speaking of Murder (1953) - Inspector McKay (uncredited)
- Child's Play (1954) - Police Superintendent
- Confession (1955) - Superintendent Beckman
- Portrait of Alison (1955) - (uncredited)
- Handcuffs, London (1955) - Det. Sgt Wyatt
- Private's Progress (1956) - General Tomlinson
- 23 Paces to Baker Street (1956) - Police Inspector (uncredited)
- Morning Call (1957) - Plainclothesman
- Brothers in Law (1957) - Cleaver
- There's Always a Thursday (1957) - Crosby
- The Crooked Sky (1957) - Senior Civil Servant
- Five Clues to Fortune (1957) - Mr Robson
- The Big Chance (1957) - Police Inspector
- The One That Got Away (1957) - Bystander (uncredited)
- Man from Tangier (1957) - Inspector Meredith
- Zoo Baby (1957) - Plumber
- Count Five and Die (1957) - Lt Miller
- Undercover Girl (1958) - Det. Insp. Willingdon
- Violent Playground (1958) - (uncredited)
- Gideon's Day (1958) - Henry Dawson (uncredited)
- A Night to Remember (1958) - Chief Engineer Johnston, SS Carpathia (uncredited)
- Corridors of Blood (1958) - Wilkes
- Hidden Homicide (1959) - Ashbury
- The Great Van Robbery (1959) - Surgeon
- The Child and the Killer (1959) - Inspector
- Innocent Meeting (1959) - Martin
- Web of Suspicion (1959) - Inspector Clark
- No Safety Ahead (1959) - Langton
- High Jump (1959) - Inspector
- The Heart of a Man (1959) - Policeman (uncredited)
- A Woman's Temptation (1959) - Police Constable
- Follow a Star (1959) - Policeman (uncredited)
- Dead Lucky (1960) - Assistant Commissioner (uncredited)
- Beat Girl (1960) - FO Official
- A Taste of Honey (1961) - Simpson
- Information Received (1961) - Supt Jeffcote
- Two and Two Make Six (1962) - Policeman (uncredited)
- The Traitors (1962)
- Jigsaw (1962) - Chief Constable (uncredited)
- Live Now – Pay Later (1962)
- The Comedy Man (1964) - (uncredited)
- Where the Spies Are (1966) - Sir Robert
- Prehistoric Women (1967) - Colonel Hammond
- Subterfuge (1968) - Fennimore
- The Haunted House of Horror (1969) - John Bradley
- The Magic Christian (1969) - Maltravers
- Loot (1970) - Doctor
- Toomorrow (1970) - Principal (uncredited)
- The Rise and Rise of Michael Rimmer (1970) - General Strike
- Dad's Army (1971) - Inspector Hardcastle
- To Catch a Spy (1971) - Ambassador
- Tomorrow (1972) - (uncredited)
- A Nightingale Sang in Berkeley Square (1979) - Judge
- The Mirror Crack'd (1980) - Villager (uncredited)

== Television appearances ==
- Educated Evans (1957, 1 episode) as Sergeant
- Charlesworth (1959, 1 episode) as Inspector Godfrey
- Francis Storm Investigates (1960, 1 episode) as Chief Inspector Bloom
- The Saint (TV series) (1964, 1 episode - Lida) as Inspector Maxwell
- The Sullavan Brothers (1965, 1 episode) as Jim Fenn
- The Empty Seat (late 1960s) as the Presenter Narrator, and fictional Driving Instructor (Television Trade Test short film)
- Dad's Army (1970-1977, 38 episodes) as The Colonel / Captain Pritchard / HG Sergeant
- Steptoe and Son (1970, 1 episode) as Mr Caldwell
- The Liver Birds (1971, 1 episode) as Manager
- Bless This House (1972-1974, 1 episode) as George Humphries / Sir Maxwell
- Are You Being Served? (1973-1974, 2 episodes) as The 40" Waist / Dr Wainwright
- My Name Is Harry Worth (1974, 1 episode) as Magistrate
- Love Thy Neighbour (1975, 1 episode) as Doctor
- You're Only Young Twice (1977) as Mr Whittaker
- Going Straight (1978, 1 episode) as Inspector
- George and Mildred (1978-1979, 3 episodes) as Mr Bowles / Brown / Reginald Clifton-White
- Robin's Nest (1979) as Carter
- Nancy Astor (1982, 2 episodes) as MP
