= Web of Suspicion =

1959 British film by Max Varnel

- British theatrical poster
- Directed by: Max Varnel
- Written by: Brian Clemens; Eldon Howard
- Produced by: Edward J. Danziger; Harry Lee Danziger
- Starring: Philip Friend; Susan Beaumont
- Cinematography: James Wilson
- Production company: Danziger Productions (UK)
- Release date: May 1959 (UK)
- Running time: 70 minutes
- Country: United Kingdom
- Language: English

Web of Suspicion is a 1959 British crime film directed by Max Varnel and starring Philip Friend and Susan Beaumont. It was written by Brian Clemens and Eldon Howard and produced by The Danzigers.

== Plot ==
Schoolteacher Bradley Wells is wrongly accused of murdering a girl pupil, and is nearly lynched by angry townspeople. With the help of his art teacher girlfriend Janet he discovers the real murderer, and works with Janet to clear his name and save the school from another tragedy.

== Cast ==
- Philip Friend as Bradley Wells
- Susan Beaumont as Janet Shenley
- John Martin as Eric Turner
- Peter Sinclair as Tom Wright
- Robert Raglan as Inspector Clark
- Peter Elliott as Watson
- Ian Fleming as Forbes
- John Brooking as Holt
- Hal Osmond as Charlie

== Critical reception ==
The Monthly Film Bulletin wrote: "The doggedly inept line of investigation followed by the police, and the idea of a lynch mob in rural England, are just two factors which rob this routine crime story of all conviction and suspense. The weak plot is given flat direction and stolid acting, and only the backgrounds arouse some slight degree of interest."

Picturegoer wrote: "An unsubtle portrayal by the villain robs the film of its surprise. I'd say a dunce could name the killer in the wink of an eye."

Picture Show wrote: "It's lacking in the most essential ingredient for a murder mystery – excitement. The acting, too, could have been much better all round.

In British Sound Films: The Studio Years 1928–1959 David Quinlan rated the film as "mediocre", writing: "Killer is obvious but script has enough unintentional humour to stifle yawns."
