= Three Steps to the Gallows =

1953 British film by John Gilling

- Theatrical release poster
- Directed by: John Gilling
- Written by: Paul Erickson; John Gilling
- Produced by: Robert S. Baker; Monty Berman
- Starring: Scott Brady; Mary Castle; Gabrielle Brune
- Cinematography: Monty Berman
- Edited by: Margery Saunders
- Music by: Stanley Black
- Production company: Tempean Films
- Distributed by: Eros Films; Lippert Pictures (US)
- Release date: December 1953
- Running time: 81 minutes
- Country: United Kingdom
- Language: English

Three Steps to the Gallows is a 1953 British second feature crime film directed by John Gilling and starring Scott Brady, Mary Castle and Gabrielle Brune. It was written by Paul Erickson and Gilling, and released in the US by Lippert Pictures as White Fire.

== Plot ==
An American merchant ship officer on shore leave in London learns that his brother is about to be hanged in three days and sets out to prove his innocence against an organised smuggling gang based in a nightclub. His plight becomes increasingly tense in the face of double crosses and bad decisions in a race against time.

== Cast ==
- Scott Brady as Gregor Stevens
- Mary Castle as Yvonne Durante
- Gabrielle Brune as Lorna Dryhurst
- Ferdy Mayne as Mario Sartago
- Colin Tapley as Arnold Winslow
- John Blythe as Dave Leary
- Michael Balfour as Carter
- Lloyd Lamble as James Smith
- Julian Somers as John Durante
- Ballard Berkeley as Inspector Haley
- Ronan O'Casey as Crawson
- Johnnie Schofield as Charley
- Paul Erickson as Larry Stevens
- Bill Lowe as Percy
- Ronald Leigh-Hunt as Captain Adams
- Dennis Chinnery as Bill
- Hal Osmond as desk clerk
- Alastair Hunter as hotel manager
- Arthur Lovegrove as Tommy
- Harcourt Curaçao as Matt
- Russell Westwood as Mike
- Larry Taylor as Sam
- Neil Hallett as Real Counterman
- Conrad Phillips as clerk, travel agent
- Stanley Meadows as 2nd clerk, travel agent
- Arthur Mullard as prison warder
- Leonard Sharp as clerk, Somerset House
- Joe Wadham as police driver

== Production ==
It was produced by the Tempean Films and made at the Southall Studios with sets designed by the art director Wilfred Arnold. Location shooting took place in London including on Regent Street, around Chelsea and at the Olympia Exhibition Centre.

== Critical reception ==
Kine Weekly said "Romantic crime melodrama, unfolded in the metropolis. Its tale of mayhem and murder wants a bit of following, yet, for all its complexity it manages to hold the interest and hand out quite a number of thrills. The cast, headed by popular American players, is sound. Grim and good humoured in turn, it provides the variety that is the spice of mystery fare."

Monthly Film Bulletin said "A conventional thriller. The only novel idea – using the British Industries Fair as the setting for a manhunt – has not been at all well exploited. Scott Brady adequately fills the role of the American-in-Britain inevitable in this type of crime story."

Picture Show wrote: "Scott Brady excels as the star and Mary Castle is attractive in the leading feminine role. Skilful blend of smuggling and murder."

Picturegoer wrote: "Though it piles confusion upon confusion, this well-made murder hunt hangs well together. ... Conventionally exciting, it has many well photographed action shots. The atmosphere is good, the dialogue effective. Brady gives a forceful show of muscles and brain; Mary Castle – the girl who looks like Rita Hayworth – makes pleasant company."

In British Sound Films: The Studio Years 1928–1959 David Quinlan rated the film as "average", writing: "Very formula thriller, given a litle gloss by its two Hollywood stars."

Chibnall and McFarlane in The British 'B' Film wrote that the film: "took [a] walk on London's wild side ...in the company of a visiting American seaman huskily played by Scott Brady. His leading lady was another minor Hollywood star, the Rita Hayworth look-alike Mary Castle. Although formulaic, the action was brisk and often violent, and the settings, as usual, were authentic – including a sequence at the British Industries Fair."
