= Undercover Girl (1958 film) =

British film by Francis Searle

- DVD cover also featuring Undercover Agent
- Directed by: Francis Searle
- Written by: Bernard Lewis; Bill Luckwell
- Produced by: Bill Luckwell; Kay Luckwell
- Starring: Paul Carpenter; Kay Callard; Bruce Seton
- Cinematography: Geoffrey Faithfull
- Edited by: Douglas Myers
- Music by: W.L. Trytel
- Production company: Luckwell Productions
- Distributed by: Butcher's Film Distributors
- Release date: January 1958
- Running time: 68 minutes
- Country: United Kingdom
- Language: English

Undercover Girl is a 1958 British second feature crime film directed by Francis Searle and starring Paul Carpenter, Kay Callard and Bruce Seton. It was written by Bernard Lewis and Bill Luckwell.

A photographer combats a ruthless extortionist.

== Plot ==
Crime reporter Billy Peters is murdered while investigating a case. His brother-in-law, Johnny Carter, discovers that the murderer was club-owner Ted Austin, who runs a blackmail racket. Austin is also responsible for Carter's girlfriend's sister Peggy becoming a drug addict. Carter traps Austin in his club and a gun battle ensues.

== Cast ==
- Paul Carpenter as Johnny Carter
- Kay Callard as Joan Foster
- Monica Grey as Evelyn King
- Bruce Seton as Ted Austin
- Jackie Collins as Peggy Foster
- Maya Koumani as Miss Brazil
- Kim Parker as maid
- Tony Quinn as Mike O'Sullivan
- John Boxer as Farrell
- Alexander Field as Hunter
- Paddy Ryan as Cash
- Milton Reid as Mac
- Eleanor Leigh as Carrie
- Robert Raglan as Willingdon
- George Roderick as Johnson
- Michael Moore as Dr. Miller
- Totti Truman Taylor as Nurse Fry
- Mark Hashfield as doctor
- Gerry Collins as barman

== Production ==
The film was shot at Twickenham Studios, with sets designed by the art director Denys Pavitt.

== Critical reception ==
Monthly Film Bulletin said "In spite of its abundance of action, this film fails to carry the audience with it. The actors seem unconvinced by their parts, and the prevailing sense of implausibility quickly communicates itself. There appears to be some unnecessary violence spicing the plot in the scene where Peggy's face is mutilated in a last act of revenge on the part of the villain."

The Radio Times Guide to Films gave the film 2/5 stars, writing: "This cheap British B-movie has the regulation 'glamour' leading lady and the obligatory American (in this case Canadian) leading man. Former band crooner Paul Carpenter is an amiable star of sorts and co-star Kay Callard has a passable second-string leading lady quality. The real interest lies in the appearance in an 'acting' role of Jackie Collins, now better known for writing raunchy novels."

In British Sound Films: The Studio Years 1928–1959 David Quinlan rated the film as "poor", writing: "Capable cast swamped by truly dreadful treatment of story, including a fight where the 'punches' miss by miles. Deplorable."

== Home media ==
The film was released in 2013 on DVD (with Undercover Agent (1953)) by Renown Films.
