= Paul Erickson (screenwriter) =

British screenwriter (1920–1991)

- Born: Frederick Redwood Watts; 22 November 1920; Cardiff, Glamorgan, Wales
- Died: 27 October 1991 (aged 70); Lambeth, London, England
- Occupation: screenwriter

Paul Erickson (22 November 1920 – 27 October 1991) was a British screenwriter, most active in the 1950s and 1960s.

== Career ==
Erickson contributed generally single episodes to a wide variety of British television shows, most typically of the crime drama genre, although he did occasionally generate science fiction scripts. In the 1950s, he would have generally been considered a B movie or telemovie writer. By the 1960s, however, his work was almost exclusively for episodic and anthologic television. He sold three scripts for the third season of The Saint, adapted William Tenn's short story, "Time in Advance", for Out of the Unknown, wrote The Ark for Doctor Who, and contributed to The Inside Man and Paul Temple.

In the 1980s he novelised his Doctor Who story The Ark for Target Books.

== Personal life ==
In 1951, he married Gemma Vitale/Sighe. It has been suggested that she was Lesley Scott, who received screen credit for co-writing The Ark. Later on in 1986, Erickson married Monica Baker.

== Selected filmography ==
- Three Steps to the Gallows (1953)
- The Green Carnation (1954)
- Track the Man Down (1955)
- Secret Venture (1955)
- Kill Her Gently (1957)
- Night of the Prowler (1962)
- The Marked One (1963)
