= The Rivals (1964 film) =

1964 British film by Max Varnel

- Theatrical release poster
- Directed by: Max Varnel
- Screenplay by: John Roddick
- Based on: a story by Edgar Wallace
- Produced by: Jack Greenwood
- Starring: Jack Gwillim; Erica Rogers
- Cinematography: James Wilson
- Edited by: Derek Holding
- Music by: Bernard Ebbinghouse
- Production company: Merton Park Studios
- Distributed by: Anglo-Amalgamated
- Release date: 9 February 1964
- Running time: 54 minutes
- Country: United Kingdom
- Language: English

The Rivals is a 1964 British second feature film directed by Max Varnel and starring Jack Gwillim, Erica Rogers and Brian Smith. Part of the series of Edgar Wallace Mysteries films made at Merton Park Studios, it is based on a story by Wallace.

== Plot ==
Jimmy Vosler, Kim Harris and Steve Houston are a trio of car thieves. They steal a car and in the glove compartment find a beret with a brooch, and a ransom note demanding £75,000 addressed to Rolf Neilson, a wealthy man whose daughter (Christina) has been kidnapped. They realise they have stolen the abductor's car, and with the beret they can collect the ransom themselves, without needing the daughter.

== Cast ==
- Jack Gwillim as Rolf Neilson
- Erica Rogers as Kim Harris
- Brian Smith as Steve Houston
- Tony Garnett as Jimmy Vosler
- Barry Linehan as Paul Kenyon
- Murray Hayne as Alex Nichols
- Howard Greene as Eddy McQuire
- Philip Latham as Lawrence
- Maria Lennard as Phillipa Martin
- Jack Rodney as Mick O'Leary
- Rex One One Five as Alsatian dog
