= Eyewitness (1956 film) =

1956 British film by Muriel Box

- British 1-sheet poster
- Directed by: Muriel Box
- Written by: Janet Green
- Produced by: Sydney Box
- Starring: Donald Sinden; Muriel Pavlow; Belinda Lee; Michael Craig
- Production company: Rank
- Distributed by: Rank Organisation
- Release date: 14 August 1956
- Running time: 82 minutes
- Country: United Kingdom
- Language: English

Eyewitness (also known as Point of Crisis) is a 1956 British thriller film directed by Muriel Box and starring Donald Sinden, Muriel Pavlow, Belinda Lee, Michael Craig, Nigel Stock and Richard Wattis. It was produced by Sydney Box for the Rank Organisation.

== Plot ==
After an argument with her husband, Lucy Church storms out of her house and goes to see a film at the local cinema. While coming back from making a phone call, she stumbles across the office where she witnesses the murder of the cinema manager by two criminals, Wade and Barney, who are in the process of robbing the cinema's safe. When they pursue her, she is struck by a bus and is taken to the hospital. Unable to leave the town until they know what has happened to her, the two robbers head to the hospital to observe her. Meanwhile, her husband, Jay Church, has grown concerned and scours the town searching for her.

At the hospital the medical staff attend to Lucy and place her in a quiet ward although she has yet to regain consciousness. Wade, watching from the nearby shrubbery realises that if she lives, she would be able to identify him, and he would be hanged for murder, and he decides to murder her in spite of the protests of his partner, Barney, who has grown disillusioned with his sinister intent. Wade is uninterested and beats him. He tries several times to enter the hospital to suffocate her but is repeatedly foiled by the watchfulness of an elderly patient and a series of interruptions by the nurse's boyfriend, an expectant father, and the watchman and dog on their rounds.

Eventually, Wade assumes the disguise of a hospital orderly and takes Lucy to the operating theatre where he plans to murder her—only to be prevented by the sudden reappearance of Barney, his associate.

== Cast ==
- Donald Sinden as Wade
- Muriel Pavlow as Lucy Church
- Belinda Lee as Nurse Penny Marston
- Michael Craig as Jay Church
- Nigel Stock as Barney
- Susan Beaumont as probationary nurse
- David Knight as Mike
- Ada Reeve as Mrs Hudson
- Avice Landone as Night Sister
- Richard Wattis as anaesthetist
- George Woodbridge as hospital security man
- Gillian Harrison as Molly
- Nicholas Parsons as house surgeon
- Leslie Dwyer as Henry Cannon, expectant father
- Allan Cuthbertson as Detective Inspector
- Thomas Heathcote as Tom, the barman
- Anna Turner as Mrs. Hays
- Anthony Oliver as Podge
- Hal Osmond as hospital doorman

== Production ==
The lead role of a murderer was a change of pace for actor Donald Sinden, who did extensive research for the part, modelling his performance on Neville Heath.

The film was shot in mid-1956. It was one of several "sensible girl" parts Lee played for Rank.

Michael Craig wrote Box's "skills as a director were confined to the ability to say 'Action!' and 'Cut!' She was a very nice lady, a bit like a deputy headmistress, but her main concern while filming seemed to be how the set was dressed."

== Critical reception ==
Variety called it "A neatly made, unpretentious thriller that should do well for the home market... makes for suspenseful action, although the story is improbable in some of its twists." The pic is well acted and well served by its director and camera crew.

The Monthly Film Bulletin thought the theme "was a serviceable one, but here the producers have so over-laden the storyline with cozy comic characters as to make one wonder if their intention was to deliberately guy their material. Only Nigel Stock and the spirited Ada Reeve emerge with credit, and the melodrama is unadventurously developed."

TV Guide gave the film two out of five stars, noting "a nice little thriller by the Sydney and Muriel Box team."

Britmovie wrote, "the minor suspenser has several threads but unfurls with a good sense of timing and provides both excitement and light-hearted moments of humour. Donald Sinden, a rather bland leading man, successfully attempts a very different character role, conveying all the ruthlessness of the cold-blooded killer. There’s also a fine supporting role from Nigel Stock as a deaf safe-breaker."

In British Sound Films: The Studio Years 1928–1959, David Quinlan rated the film as "average", writing: "Spotty thriller with miscast stars; Stock, though, is very good."

The Radio Times Guide to Films gave the film 3/5 stars, writing: "Donald Sinden, a rather bland leading man on both stage and screen before this was made, successfully attempts a rather different role, conveying all the ruthlessness of the heartless killer as he tries to rub out the witness to a crime. He is effectively supported by Muriel Pavlow (as his intended victim), while director Muriel Box unfurls the suspense with good timing."

In his memoirs, Sinden wrote the film "is now shown on television more frequently than any of my other films, but ironically when it first opened, to rather bad press reviews, commercial television was in its infancy and yet to make the impact that was to change the lives of everyone in the country, not the least those in the Rankery."
