= Gordon Tanner =

Canadian actor (1918–1983)

- Born: July 17, 1918; Toronto, Ontario, Canada
- Died: August 3, 1983 (aged 65); Canada
- Occupation: Actor
- Years active: 1957-1981

Gordon Tanner (July 17, 1918–August 3, 1983) was a Canadian actor.

== Filmography ==
Year	Title	Role	Notes
1949	The Third Man	International Patrol C	Uncredited
1949	Golden Arrow	Bixby	
1950	State Secret	Joe	Uncredited
1951	Talk of a Million		Uncredited
1956	House of Secrets	Curtice	
1957	Fire Down Below	2nd U.S. Sailor	
1957	Time Lock	Dr. Hewitson	
1957	Campbell's Kingdom	Cliff	
1958	A Woman of Mystery	Minor Role	Uncredited
1958	On the Run	Bart Taylor	
1958	Carry On Sergeant	First Specialist	
1958	The Sheriff of Fractured Jaw	Wilkins	
1958	Floods of Fear	Lt. Colonel	
1961	The Green Helmet	Hastrow	
1963	The Sicilians	District attorney	
1964	Dr. Strangelove	General Faceman	
1965	The Return of Mr. Moto	Russell McAllister	
1966	Where the Spies Are	Inspector	
1966	The Vulture		Uncredited
1967	The Prisoner	Town Elder	
1974	Caravan to Vaccares	American guest #2	
1975	Eskimo Nell	Big Dick	
1981	Brideshead Revisited	Mr. Kramm	1 episode (final appearance)
