= The Spaniard's Curse =

1958 British film by Ralph Kemplen

- Directed by: Ralph Kemplen
- Written by: Kenneth Hyde; Ralph Kemplen; Roger Proudlock
- Based on: The Assize Of The Dying by Edith Pargeter
- Produced by: Roger Proudlock
- Starring: Tony Wright; Lee Patterson; Michael Hordern; Susan Beaumont
- Cinematography: Arthur Grant
- Edited by: Stan Hawkes
- Music by: Lambert Williamson
- Production company: Wentworth Films
- Distributed by: Independent Film Distributors
- Release date: 14 July 1958
- Running time: 80 minutes
- Country: United Kingdom
- Language: English

The Spaniard's Curse is a 1958 British second feature ('B') thriller film directed by Ralph Kemplen and starring Tony Wright, Lee Patterson, Michael Hordern, Susan Beaumont and Henry Oscar. It was written by Kenneth Hyde, Kemplen and Roger Proudlock based on the 1958 novella The Assize of the Dying by Edith Pargeter.

== Plot ==
Guy Stevenson is a British man of Spanish heritage, in poor health and on trial for the murder of an actress called Zoe Trevor. He is convicted and given the death sentence. He protests his innocence and places a curse on the trial judge, Justice Manton; the prosecuting counsel, Sir Robert Wyvern; the foreman of the jury; and the real murderer. The curse is a summons to attend the 'Assize of the Dying'. Watching the proceedings from the court gallery are Justice Manton's ward, Margaret, his son Charlie, and Zoe Trevor's half-brother, Mark Brett. Charlie is covering the case as a newspaper reporter. We learn that he is a much decorated ex-RAF officer and gambler. After the trial, Margaret makes the acquaintance of Mark Brett, and tells him of her doubts of Stevenson's guilt. Mark seems to have arrived from abroad and claims never to have met his half-sister. They are attracted to each other and decide to re-examine the case. The foreman of the jury is killed in a road accident in front of them immediately afterwards. Stevenson dies of a heart condition before his sentence can be carried out and evidence is later discovered that appears to exonerate him. Margaret and Mark continue their investigation, with occasional interventions from Charlie, who also seems to have romantic feelings towards Margaret, as the curse works itself out.

== Cast ==
- Tony Wright as Charlie Manton
- Lee Patterson as Mark Brett
- Michael Hordern as Mr Justice Manton
- Susan Beaumont as Margaret Manton
- Ralph Truman as Sir Robert Wyvern
- Henry Oscar as Mr Fredericks
- Brian Oulton as Frank Porter
- Olga Dickie as Hannah
- Roddy Hughes as Arthur Jody
- Joe Gibbons as Foreman
- Evelyn Roberts as Colonel Judkin
- Jessica Cairns as Adriana
- Constance Fraser as Mrs Brooks
- Basil Dignam as Guy Stevenson

== Production ==
The film was shot at Walton Studios near London with sets designed by the art director Anthony Masters. Filming took place in July 1957. Tony Wright was borrowed from the Rank Organisation.

== Critical reception ==
Kinematograph Weekly wrote "The picture piles quite a lot on its plate, but eventually separates the gristle from the meat, done to a turn at the finish."

The Monthly Film Bulletin wrote: "This is an absurd, melodramatic plot, with a script as archaic as its title; given an uncompromisingly sensational treatment it might have made an amusing addition to the ranks of the horror films. But the approach is restrained and unadventurous, the direction static, and the background music of 1930's vintage. The result is a laborious programme-filler."

Picturegoer wrote: "Definitely a 'brief' worth watching."

Picture Show wrote: "Exciting murder mystery in which a condemned murderer curses all those who have, as he claims, wrongly convicted him. Plenty of action, well-timed twists and a romance provide absorbing entertainment."

TV Guide called the film "an interesting murder mystery but one which never really delivers what it promises."

The Radio Times gave the film 2/5 stars, writing: "Tony Wright has the most colourful part as the judge's wayward son, a crime reporter, but Michael Hordern as the judge gives the sharpest performance. It's the only film directed by top editor Ralph Kemplen, who wisely returned to his real talent, cutting Room at the Top, Oliver! and others."

In British Sound Films: The Studio Years 1928–1959 David Quinlan rated the film as "average", writing: "Interesting yarn lacks full-blooded treatment."
