= Shirley Eaton =

British actress (born 1937)

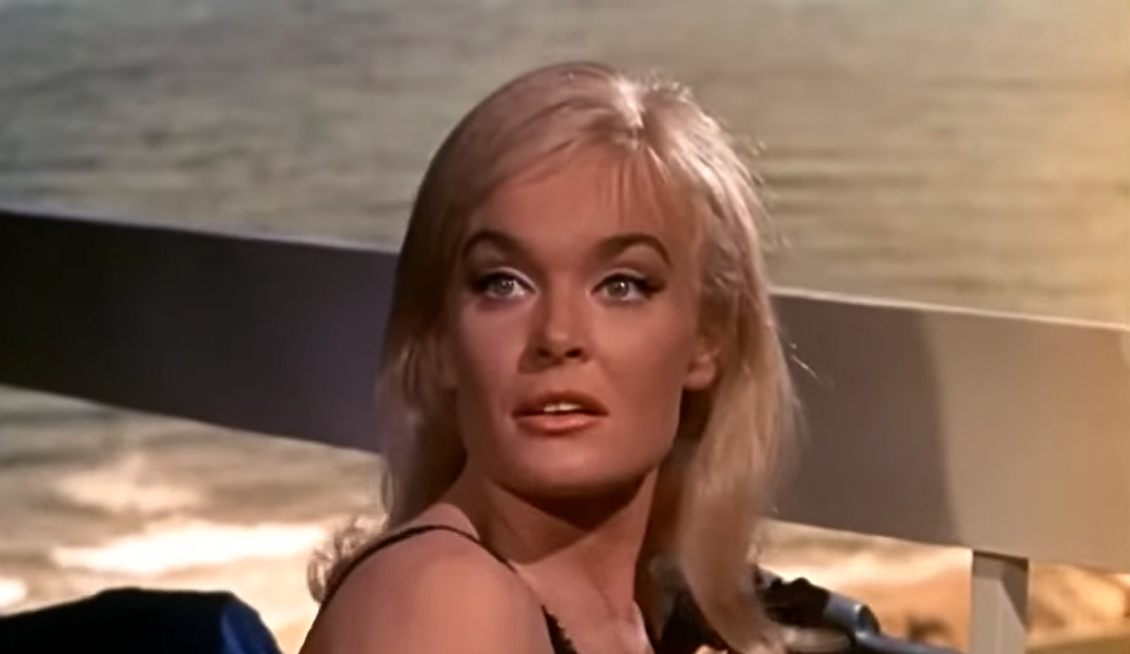
- Eaton as Jill Masterson in Goldfinger (1964)
- Born: Shirley Jean Eaton; 12 January 1937 (age 89); Edgware, Middlesex, England
- Occupations: Actress, singer
- Years active: 1951–1969, 1999–2009
- Known for: Portraying Jill Masterson in Goldfinger
- Spouse: Colin Rowe (m. 1957; died 1994)
- Children: 2

Shirley Jean Eaton (born 12 January 1937) is an English former actress and singer. Eaton appeared regularly in British films throughout the 1950s and 1960s, and gained her highest profile for her appearance as Bond Girl Jill Masterson in the James Bond film Goldfinger (1964), which gained her bombshell status. Eaton also had roles in the early Carry On films.

Preferring to devote herself to bringing up a family, she retired from acting in 1969. Eaton came out of retirement in 1999 to release her autobiography titled Golden Girl, which was a bestseller, and has released three more books throughout the 2000s.

== Early life ==
Eaton was born on 12 January 1937 in Edgware General Hospital, Middlesex, and brought up in the suburb of Kingsbury. She attended Roe Green Primary School on Princes Avenue, and although living close to both Kingsbury County Grammar School and Tylers Croft Secondary Modern School, won a place at the Aida Foster Theatre School, a specialist drama school, and remained there until she was sixteen. Her stage debut was in Benjamin Britten's Let's Make an Opera! and her West End debut was in 1954 in Going to Town.

== Career ==
All through the 1950s, Eaton was a singing star, both on the stage and on television, appearing with her own act in variety shows throughout the country and starring at the Prince of Wales Theatre in London in her own solo singing act, as well as appearing in many films. According to Filmink Eaton "was in constant employment almost immediately – in particular, displaying a real flair for comedy."

Throughout her career, Eaton appeared with many of the top British comedy stars of the period, including Jimmy Edwards; Max Bygraves; Bob Monkhouse; Arthur Askey; Thora Hird; and Dora Bryan among others. Her early roles include Three Men in a Boat (1956) and Date with Disaster (1957), in which she co-starred with Tom Drake. She appeared in The Belles of St. Trinian's (1954), two of the "Doctor" film series, three early Carry On films and worked with the Crazy Gang in Life Is a Circus (1958). Eaton's co-stars in the comedy The Naked Truth (1957), included Peggy Mount; Dennis Price; Joan Sims; Terry Thomas and Peter Sellers.

Eaton left comedy roles by appearing opposite Mickey Spillane in The Girl Hunters (1963) in which Spillane played his own literary creation Mike Hammer. During the 1962 London shoot she appeared on stage in Come Blow Your Horn. She made three episodes of The Saint, starring Roger Moore, including the pilot. She was in a 1962 episode of the British television series Man of the World that was the pilot for the TV series The Sentimental Agent. Her episode was included in a 1963 feature film of the series entitled Our Man in the Caribbean.

Eaton achieved the most recognition for her performance as Jill Masterson in the James Bond film Goldfinger (1964). She appeared on the cover of Life magazine in her gold-painted persona. Her character's death, being painted head to toe in gold paint and suffering "skin suffocation", led to an urban myth that Eaton had died during filming. She appeared in a 2003 episode of the series MythBusters to dispel the rumor.

After Goldfinger, Eaton made only a few more films, including a pair of films for Ivan Tors, Rhino! (1964) and Around the World Under the Sea (1966), a Harry Alan Towers version of the Agatha Christie mystery Ten Little Indians (1965) co-starring Hugh O'Brian and a Bob Hope comedy, Eight on the Lam (1967), plus the title role of Sax Rohmer's Sumuru in Towers' The Million Eyes of Sumuru (1967) and The Girl from Rio (1969).

In a 2014 interview, she explained, "After I finished The Million Eyes of Sumuru and was coming home in the plane was when I made the decision to quit. I hated being away from my baby Jason and his brother Grant. However, I did enjoy being the wicked lady Sumuru in two rather bad films, which I had not had the chance to be before. I do believe they have become cult films now."

== Personal life ==
Eaton was married to Colin Lenton Rowe from 1957 until his death in 1994. The couple had two sons, Grant and Jason. Eaton retired from acting to bring up her family and later commented in a 1999 interview with Steve Swires of Starlog magazine, "A career is a career, but you're a mother until you die". She repeated this statement in an interview with the journalist James Davies on 18 June 2008, adding, "The most important thing for me was being a woman and having a family more than being a very famous glamorous actress".

Eaton published an autobiography in 1999 titled Golden Girl. Her later book (Golden Girl Shirley Eaton: Her Reflections) is a picture book of all her film photos from throughout her career and the second book (Shirley Eaton, Bond's Golden Girl; Her Own Art Gallery) is full of her paintings and sculptures made over a lifetime and, more recently, her art and photography. She also has an official website.

== In popular culture ==
The main character in Jonathan Coe's novel What a Carve Up! is obsessed with Eaton in her role in the film of the same name.

== Filmography ==
=== Film ===
| Year | Film | Role | Notes |
|---|---|---|---|
| 1953 | Personal Affair | Schoolgirl | Uncredited |
| 1953 | A Day to Remember | Young Woman on Ferry | Uncredited |
| 1954 | You Know What Sailors Are | Palace Girl | Uncredited |
| 1954 | Doctor in the House | Milly Groaker | |
| 1954 | The Belles of St. Trinian's | Sixth Former | Uncredited |
| 1955 | The Love Match | Rose Brown | |
| 1956 | Charley Moon | Angel Dream | |
| 1956 | Sailor Beware! | Shirley Hornett | |
| 1956 | Three Men in a Boat | Sophie Clutterbuck | |
| 1957 | Doctor at Large | Nan | |
| 1957 | Date with Disaster | Sue | |
| 1957 | The Naked Truth | Melissa Right | |
| 1958 | Carry On Sergeant | Mary Sage | |
| 1958 | Further Up the Creek | Jane | |
| 1959 | Carry On Nurse | Staff Nurse Dorothy Denton | |
| 1959 | In the Wake of a Stranger | Joyce Edwards | |
| 1960 | Life Is a Circus | Shirley Winter | |
| 1960 | Carry On Constable | Sally Barry | |
| 1961 | Nearly a Nasty Accident | Cpl. Jean Briggs | |
| 1961 | Dentist on the Job | Jill Venner | |
| 1961 | A Weekend with Lulu | Deirdre Proudfoot | |
| 1961 | What a Carve Up! | Linda Dickson | |
| 1962 | Our Man in the Caribbean | Lee | |
| 1963 | The Girl Hunters | Laura Knapp | |
| 1964 | Rhino! | Miss Arleigh | |
| 1964 | Goldfinger | Jill Masterson | |
| 1965 | The Naked Brigade | Diana Forsythe | |
| 1965 | Ten Little Indians | Ann Clyde | |
| 1966 | Around the World Under the Sea | Dr. Margaret Hanford | |
| 1967 | Eight on the Lam | Ellie Barton | |
| 1967 | The Million Eyes of Sumuru | Sumuru | |
| 1967 | The Scorpio Letters | Phoebe Stewart | |
| 1968 | The Blood of Fu Manchu | Black Widow | |
| 1969 | The Girl from Rio | Sumuru/Sumitra | |
| 2001 | Everdream | Talent scout | short |

=== Television ===
| Year | Film | Role | Notes |
|---|---|---|---|
| 1950 | For the Children | Tina Crome | Episode: "Let's Make an Opera!" |
| 1951 | Parent-Craft | Anne Pebble | All 6 episodes |
| 1954 | And So to Bentley | Girl | Episode: #1.5 |
| 1955 | The Dance Dress | Fay | TV film |
| 1957 | Mostly Maynard | Various | Episode: #1.3 |
| 1957 | BBC Sunday-Night Theatre | Peggy Harrison | Episode: "His Excellency" |
| 1962 | The Saint | Adrienne Halberd | Episode: "The Talented Husband" |
| 1962 | Man of the World | Lee | Episode: "The Sentimental Agent" |
| 1962 | The Saint | Gloria Uckrose | Episode: "The Effete Angler" |
| 1968 | The Saint | Reb Denning | Episode: "Invitation to Danger" |
