= Secret Venture =

- Directed by: R. G. Springsteen
- Written by: Paul Erickson
- Produced by: George H. Brown
- Starring: Kent Taylor; Jane Hylton; Kathleen Byron
- Cinematography: Basil Emmott
- Edited by: John Seabourne
- Music by: Lambert Williamson
- Distributed by: Republic Pictures
- Release date: July 1955
- Running time: 70 minutes
- Country: United Kingdom
- Language: English

Secret Venture is a 1955 British second feature ('B') thriller film directed by R. G. Springsteen and starring Kent Taylor, Jane Hylton and Kathleen Byron. It was written by Paul Erickson.

== Plot ==
Renowned scientist Professor Henrik returns to England from a working trip overseas and is met by his glamorous secretary Joan. American Ted O'Hara has come in on the same flight and in the bustle of the airport he and Henrik mistakenly pick up each other's identical briefcases, and O'Hara innocently departs with a briefcase containing a top-secret formula for a revolutionary new type of jet fuel.

Later, Henrik is abducted by a group headed by a sinister man named Zelinsky, who are eager to lay their hands on the formula. They are furious to find that Henrik's briefcase contains nothing more than the everyday bits and pieces of a man called O'Hara. They detail one of their number, the sultry Renée, to track down O'Hara and gain his confidence. This she does, then a henchman appears and forcibly takes the puzzled O'Hara to the headquarters of the Zelinsky operation. They tell him that he has Henrik's briefcase, which he had not previously known, and that they are prepared to pay handsomely if he passes it over.

Rather than cash in on this unexpected turn of events, O'Hara goes to Scotland Yard. He says that he heard Zelinsky mention the name Weber, apparently an espionage agent in Paris. The inspector briefs O'Hara to go to Paris and make contact with Weber. O'Hara is followed by Renée and a cohort, who manage to steal the briefcase during the journey. O'Hara finds Weber in Paris, and learns that he now has the briefcase in his possession but is unable to decipher the contents which appear to be written in a complex code.

O'Hara returns to London and explains the situation to Scotland Yard. Not wanting to jeopardise Henrik's safety, the police suggest he should make contact with Joan, who seems the most likely to have the necessary information. O'Hara shadows her waiting for a moment to make unobtrusive contact, but before he can do so he is shocked to see her rendezvous with a member of the Zelinsky gang and hand over some documents to him. The scene is set, as O'Hara and the police try to establish whether the apparently innocent Joan has in fact betrayed Henrik and been a prime mover in the plot all along.

== Cast ==
- Kent Taylor as Ted O'Hara
- Jane Hylton as Joan Butler
- Kathleen Byron as Renée l'Epinal
- Karel Štěpánek as Zelinsky
- Frederick Valk as Otto Weber
- Maurice Kaufmann as Dan Fleming
- Martin Boddey as Squire Marlowe
- Arthur Lane as Bob Hendon
- Hugo Schuster as Professor Henrik
- John Boxer as Inspector Dalton
- Michael Ripper as Bill Rymer

== Reception ==
The Monthly Film Bulletin wrote: "The confusion of this reasonably entertaining spy film is such that it is never clear whether O'Hara is helping or hindering Scotland Yard. The cast approach their puzzling job conscientiously, and the denouement is finally and forcibly manoeuvred."

In British Sound Films: The Studio Years 1928–1959 David Quinlan rated the film as "mediocre", writing: "US star and director, but result is just like any other minor hunt-the-scientist thriller."
