= Three Men in a Boat (1956 film) =

British comedy by Ken Annakin

- Theatrical release poster
- Directed by: Ken Annakin
- Screenplay by: Hubert Gregg; Vernon Harris
- Based on: Three Men in a Boat by Jerome K. Jerome
- Produced by: Jack Clayton
- Starring: Laurence Harvey; Jimmy Edwards; David Tomlinson; Shirley Eaton; Jill Ireland; Lisa Gastoni
- Cinematography: Eric Cross
- Edited by: Ralph Kemplen
- Music by: John Addison
- Production company: Romulus Films
- Distributed by: Independent Film Distributors
- Release date: 25 December 1956
- Running time: 84 minutes
- Country: United Kingdom
- Language: English
- Budget: £247,137
- Box office: £212,723

Three Men in a Boat is a 1956 British CinemaScope colour comedy film directed by Ken Annakin, starring Laurence Harvey, Jimmy Edwards, David Tomlinson and Shirley Eaton. It was written by Hubert Gregg and Vernon Harris based on the 1889 novel of the same name by Jerome K. Jerome.

== Plot ==
The film is set in the Edwardian era. Harris, J, and George want to get away from it all. They decide to go on holiday boating up the River Thames to Oxford, taking with them their dog Montmorency. George is happy to get away from his job at the bank. Harris is glad to get away from Mrs. Willis, who is pressing him to marry her daughter Clara. And J is more than anxious to take a holiday from his wife, Ethelbertha.

George meets three girls, Sophie Clutterbuck and sisters Bluebell and Primrose Porterhouse, who are also taking a ride up the river, and he hopes to see them again. The travellers get into various complications with the weather, the river, the boat, food, the Hampton Court Maze, tents, rain and locks. They connect with the girls again, and when things appear to be becoming interesting for the men, Mrs. Willis and her daughter and Ethelbertha show up, and things become even more interesting.

== Cast ==
- Laurence Harvey as George
- Jimmy Edwards as Harris
- David Tomlinson as Jerome "J"
- Shirley Eaton as Sophie Clutterbuck
- Jill Ireland as Bluebell Porterhouse
- Lisa Gastoni as Primrose Porterhouse
- Martita Hunt as Mrs Willis
- Joan Haythorne as Mrs Porterhouse
- Campbell Cotts as Ambrose Porterhouse
- Adrienne Corri as Clara Willis
- Noelle Middleton as Ethelbertha
- Charles Lloyd-Pack as Mr Quilp
- Robertson Hare as photographer
- A. E. Matthews as 1st cricketer
- Miles Malleson as 2nd cricketer
- Ernest Thesiger as umpire
- Hal Osmond as cabbie

== Reception ==
=== Box office ===
The film was the 12th most popular movie at the British box office in 1957. According to Kinematograph Weekly the film was "in the money" at the British box office in 1957 and "created a surprise by smoothly sailing into the big money."

James Woolf said "It was a funny film but it wasn't successful except in England and in Paris, where it ran for nine months on the Champs-Élysées."

=== Critical ===
The Monthly Film Bulletin wrote: "Jimmy Edwards and David Tomlinson should have been ideally cast in Jerome's delightful comedy. Unfortunately, the curious adaptation and clumsy handling have effectively destroyed most of the charm and humour of the original book. The slapstick is crude and uninventive."

The Radio Times Guide to Films gave the film 4/5 stars, writing: "The ensemble, including David Tomlinson, is amiability itself, while the parasol-toting girls are as radiant as the golden days of yesteryear."

In British Sound Films: The Studio Years 1928–1959 David Quinlan rated the film as "mediocre", writing: "Colourful comedy lacks Jerome's original humour – just isn't funny."

Filmink called it "dreadful".

Leslie Halliwell said: "Flabby burlesque of a celebrated comic novel whose style is never even approached."
