= Alan Gifford =

American actor (1911–1989)

- Born: John Lennox; March 11, 1911; Taunton, Massachusetts, US
- Died: March 20, 1989 (aged 78); Blairgowrie, Perthshire, Scotland
- Occupation: Actor

Alan Gifford (born John Lennox; March 11, 1911 – March 20, 1989) was an American-born actor from Taunton, Massachusetts, who worked mainly in the UK, where he died in Blairgowrie, Scotland at age 78. Known best for his role in 2001: A Space Odyssey (1968). and featured regularly alongside Noele Gordon in the soap opera Crossroads as Dr Lloyd Monroe.

On television, in 1960, he appeared in Danger Man in the episode entitled "An Affair of State" as Mr. Hartley.

Gifford narrated the audio cassette version of the book I'm OK – You're OK.

== Selected filmography ==
- The Kangaroo Kid (1950) − Steve Corbett
- The Magic Box (1951) − Industry Man (uncredited)
- It Started in Paradise (1952) − American captain (uncredited)
- Appointment in London (1953) − US General (uncredited)
- Lilacs in the Spring (1954) − Hollywood Director
- A Prize of Gold (1955) − Major Bracken
- Barbados Quest (1955) − Henry Warburg
- No Smoking (1955) − American Ambassador
- A Yank in Ermine (1955) − Colonel M'Gurk
- The Iron Petticoat (1956) − Colonel Newt Tarbell
- Satellite in the Sky (1956) − Col. Galloway
- Hour of Decision (1957) − J. Foster Green
- Across the Bridge (1957) − Cooper
- Time Lock (1957) − George Foster
- A King in New York (1957) − School Superintendent
- The Flying Scot (1957) − Phil
- Paris Holiday (1958) − American Consul
- Escapement (1958) − Wayne − Insurance Company Chief
- Screaming Mimi (1958) − Capt. Bline
- Chain of Events (1958) − Lord Fenchurch
- The Mouse That Roared (1959) − Air Raid Warden
- Too Young to Love (1960) − Mr. Elliot
- I Aim at the Stars (1960) − U.S. Army Colonel
- Brainwashed (1960) − Mac Iver
- No Kidding (1960) − Edgar Treadgold
- Visa to Canton (1961) − Charles Orme
- Town Without Pity (1961) − Gen. Stafford
- The Road to Hong Kong (1962) − American Official
- Devil Doll (1964) − Bob Garrett
- Carry On Cowboy (1965) − Commissioner
- Where the Spies Are (1966) − Security
- Drop Dead Darling (1966) − American Brasshat
- Dark of the Sun (1968) − Jansen
- 2001: A Space Odyssey (1968) − Poole's Father
- Only When I Larf (1968) − Poster
- Isadora (1968) − Tour Manager (uncredited)
- Along the Way (1972)
- The Legend of Nigger Charley (1972) − Hill Carter
- Phase IV (1974) − Mr. Eldridge
- Everyday (1976)
- Ragtime (1981) − Judge
- Who Dares Wins (1982) − Sen. Kohoskie
