= The Flying Scot (film) =

1957 British film by Compton Bennett

- Directed by: Compton Bennett
- Screenplay by: Norman Hudis
- Based on: Jan Read; Ralph Smart (an original story by)
- Produced by: Compton Bennett
- Starring: Lee Patterson; Kay Callard; Alan Gifford
- Cinematography: Peter Hennessy
- Edited by: John Trumper
- Music by: Stanley Black
- Color process: Black and white
- Production company: Insignia Films
- Distributed by: Anglo-Amalgamated Film Distributors
- Release date: November 1957
- Running time: 70 minutes
- Country: United Kingdom
- Language: English

The Flying Scot (U.S. title: Mailbag Robbery) is a 1957 British 'B' crime film produced and directed by Compton Bennett and starring Lee Patterson, Kay Callard and Alan Gifford. The screenplay was by Norman Hudis based on a story by Jan Read and Ralph Smart.

A gang plans to steal a half-a-million pounds in banknotes from an express train.

== Plot ==
Gang members Ronnie, Jackie and Phil, aboard a train, break through from a cabin into the parcel compartment where bags of money are being carried. They work in silence to remove the back of a seat and enter the compartment and remove the bags. They then throw the bags from the train to their accomplice Gibbs who takes the money away in his van.

The gang then flies to a tropical location to celebrate their audacious crime. So far no words have been spoken as what has seemingly occurred is the gang's idea of the perfect robbery. The film then moves on to the reality of the planned crime with the gang talking about their six previous heists and their actual plan to rob the Flying Scot train of half a million pounds cash destined for destruction in London. The robberies are planned meticulously.

Ronnie and Jackie pose as newlyweds and board the overnight Flying Scot. Other gang member Phil also boards the train but Phil is ill, clutching his right rib area. He appears to have an ulcer.

Ronnie tries to break through from their cabin into the parcel compartment but finds this carriage is different to the last one, with rivets instead of screws, and more solid. Phil comes to help but he is followed by Charlie, a little boy. The train guard brings a bottle of champagne as it is his wedding anniversary today, but does not see Phil in the cabin.

Meanwhile there is a drunk on the train who is trying to recover. He previously broke into Ronnie and Jackie's cabin.

Phil goes back to Ronnie's cabin and starts to break into the parcel compartment. He is now much sicker. He starts drilling holes in the wall to enable a hole to be made. Ronnie is revealed to have a pistol under his jacket. Ronnie has to finish the drilling.

They break through and Jackie squeezes into the parcel compartment through the hole. The drunk comes to the cabin again and Ronnie gives him the champagne. Charlie sees this and knocks asking for "lemonade" like the man was given.

Charlie runs back to his cabin and says he saw something. His parents don't believe him as he is known to tell tales. Charlie tells the guard there are robbers in the cabin.

The gang is too slow to get the money so cannot throw it out of the window at the prearranged location. The guard comes to check the cabin and sees part of one of the stolen bags but they do not let him in. Aware of the attempted heist, the guard puts a message on a device and drops it at a station as the train powers on. When the train arrives in London the police are on hand to arrest the gang.

== Cast ==
- Lee Patterson as Ronnie
- Kay Callard as Jackie
- Alan Gifford as Phil
- Margaret Withers as middle-aged lady
- Mark Baker as Gibbs
- Jeremy Bodkin as Charlie, the boy
- Gerald Case as Guard
- Margaret Gordon as drunk's wife
- John Lee as young man
- Kerry Jordan as drunk
- John Dearth as father

== Critical reception ==
The Monthly Film Bulletin wrote: "The criminal trio hold one's sympathies almost throughout this ingenious and entertainingly developed thriller. The shadow of Rififi [1955] is in the background, perhaps, but the combination of suspense and humour raises this low-budget comedy thriller above the average standard of British second feature production."

Kine Weekly said "Taut crime melodrama, unfolded on the famous Flying Scot. ... There are not many characters and movement but resourceful acting and astute direction give it a terrific kick. ... The picture punctuates the interior scenes with striking "shots" of the train careering through the night and these and appropriate noises off create flawless atmosphere. ... Gripping and ingenious story, first rate performances and treatment, neat embellishments."

TV Guide wrote, "The suspense is well built in this finely constructed feature."

Sky Movies called it "An unheralded low-budget thriller which contains twice as much suspense as many more lavish productions. Taut, crisp, with a conspicuous absence of big name stars, it is a prime example of the British B movie at its best. With a bit of Hitchcock here and a touch of Rififi there (a 15-minute sequence is acted in complete silence), and a good touch of The Window (1949) with a boy who is a liar and nobody believes him, but ... the suspense is built up to a climax which leaves one hoping that just this once, crime will be allowed to pay."

In British Sound Films: The Studio Years 1928–1959 David Quinlan rated the film as "good", writing: "Famous little second feature concentrates tightly on the matter in hand, builds suspense nicely."

The Radio Times Guide to Films gave the film 1/5 stars, writing: "The most noteworthy thing about this crime programme filler is that it was scripted by Norman Hudis, who wrote six Carry On films. As with most British B-movies of the period, a clutch of transatlantic stars were imported to raise the profile, but they couldn't do much to distract from the mediocrity of this train robbery thriller."

It was one of 15 films selected by Steve Chibnall and Brian McFarlane in The British 'B' Film as among the most meritorious of the B films made in Britain between World War II and 1970. They note that it was shot in just three weeks on a budget of £18,000 and describe it as "a film not just of suspense, but of real fascination".
