= Denis Shaw =

British actor (1921–1971)

- in The Prisoner episode Arrival (1967)
- Born: Douglas Findlay Shaw; 7 February 1921; Dulwich, London, England
- Died: 28 February 1971 (aged 50); London, England
- Occupation: Actor

Douglas "Denis" Findlay Shaw (7 February 1921 – 28 February 1971) was a British character actor who specialized in portraying villains.

== Biography ==
Shaw was born in Dulwich on 7 February 1921. In the 1950s and 1960s, he was frequently cast as villains in films and television shows, most notably as the German guard Priem in The Colditz Story (1955), as well as a number of British horror films including Jack the Ripper (1959), The Mummy (1959) and The Curse of the Werewolf (1961). He was cast in the leading role of The Great Van Robbery (1959) as the judo-throwing Interpol detective Caesar Smith.

Shaw's television credits include The Adventures of Robin Hood, The Avengers, Danger Man, Dixon of Dock Green, The Prisoner, Sherlock Holmes and Z-Cars.

Shaw died from a heart attack in London on 28 February 1971, at the age of 50. A familiar face around the bars of Soho in London, he is mentioned in Keith Waterhouse's play Jeffrey Bernard Is Unwell.

== Filmography ==
| Year | Title | Role | Notes |
|---|---|---|---|
| 1952 | Girdle of Gold | Choirmaster | |
| 1953 | The Long Memory | Shaw | Uncredited |
| 1953 | House of Blackmail | Bassett | |
| 1953 | Scotland Yard (film series) ('The Candlestick Murder') | Joe Hawkins | Name on screen, but not next to rôle: October release |
| 1954 | Forbidden Cargo | Ship's Cook | Uncredited |
| 1955 | The Colditz Story | Priem | |
| 1955 | The Prisoner | Plainclothesman | Uncredited |
| 1956 | Who Done It? | Professor Otto Stumpf | |
| 1956 | Keep It Clean | Slogger O'Reilly | |
| 1956 | Port Afrique | Grila | |
| 1956 | The Weapon | Groggins | |
| 1957 | Stars in Your Eyes | Heckler | Uncredited |
| 1957 | The Flesh Is Weak | Saradine | |
| 1957 | Seven Thunders | Umschlag | Uncredited |
| 1957 | The Depraved | Inspector Flynn | |
| 1958 | Soapbox Derby | Mr. Lender | |
| 1958 | Blood of the Vampire | Blacksmith | |
| 1958 | Woman Possessed | Bishop | |
| 1958 | Moment of Indiscretion | Inspector Marsh | |
| 1958 | Links of Justice | Heth | |
| 1958 | Passport to Shame | Mac | |
| 1958 | The Great Van Robbery | Caesar Smith | |
| 1959 | Innocent Meeting | Uncle | |
| 1959 | The Bandit of Zhobe | Hussu | |
| 1959 | Jack the Ripper | Simes | |
| 1959 | No Safety Ahead | Inspector | |
| 1959 | The Man Who Could Cheat Death | Tavern Customer | Uncredited |
| 1959 | The Mummy | Mike | |
| 1959 | The Night We Dropped a Clanger | Hammerstein | |
| 1960 | Naked Fury | Captain Horst | |
| 1960 | Trouble with Eve | George Rigby | |
| 1960 | Beyond the Curtain | Krumm | |
| 1960 | Make Mine Mink | Shanghai Harry Proprietor | Uncredited |
| 1960 | The Two Faces of Dr. Jekyll | Tavern Customer | Uncredited |
| 1960 | The Criminal | Taxi Customer at Racetrack | Uncredited |
| 1961 | Ticket to Paradise | Giuseppe | |
| 1961 | The Night We Got the Bird | Stooge to Manny | |
| 1961 | The Hellfire Club | Sir Richard Benlow | |
| 1961 | Carry On Regardless | Second Sinister Passenger | Uncredited |
| 1961 | A Weekend with Lulu | Bar Patron | |
| 1961 | The Curse of the Werewolf | Gaoler | |
| 1961 | Nothing Barred | Convict #4 | |
| 1962 | The Pirates of Blood River | Silver | Uncredited |
| 1963 | The Runaway | Agent | |
| 1967 | The Deadly Affair | Wolfe | Uncredited |
| 1967 | The Viking Queen | Osiris | |
| 1967 | The Prisoner | Shopkeeper | |
| 1968 | The Magnificent Six and 1/2 | Heavyset Workman | |
| 1969 | The File of the Golden Goose | Vance | |
