= On the Run (1958 film) =

British film by Ernest Morris

- Neil McCallum in the film
- Directed by: Ernest Morris
- Written by: Brian Clemens; Eldon Howard
- Produced by: Edward J. Danziger; Harry Lee Danziger
- Starring: Neil McCallum; Susan Beaumont; William Hartnell
- Cinematography: James Wilson
- Edited by: Maurice Rootes
- Music by: Albert Elms
- Production company: Danziger Productions Ltd.
- Distributed by: United Artists
- Release date: 1 June 1958 (UK)
- Running time: 70 minutes
- Country: United Kingdom
- Language: English

On the Run is a 1958 second feature British drama film directed by Ernest Morris and starring Neil McCallum, Susan Beaumont and William Hartnell. It was written by Brian Clemens and Eldon Howard and produced by The Danzigers.

== Plot ==
Wesley is a young man on the run looking for work, when he meets Tom Casey who offers him lodging and work in his garage. Wesley and Tom's daughter Kitty fall in love. Kitty learns Wesley is a former boxer who won a fight he was supposed to have thrown, and is running away from a gang seeking revenge. The gang catch up with him and they fight in Tom's garage. Kitty and Wesley marry.

== Cast ==
- Neil McCallum as Wesley
- Susan Beaumont as Kitty Casey
- William Hartnell as Tom Casey
- Gordon Tanner as Bart Taylor
- Philip Saville as Driscoll
- Gil Winfield as Joe
- Hal Osmond as Sam Bassett

== Critical reception ==
The Monthly Film Bulletin wrote: "A conventional and unpretentious second feature, this is, within its limits, an improvement on most Danziger productions, thanks largely to agreeable performances from the three principles. Philip Saville's soft-spoken thug is effectively spine-chilling and the fights, if somewhat vicious, are realistically staged."

Picture Show wrote: "Vigorous story ... adequately acted and directed."

In British Sound Films: The Studio Years 1928–1959 David Quinlan rated the film as "average", writing: "Predictable thriller with better punch-ups than usual."
