= Lloyd Lamble =

Australian actor (1914–2008)

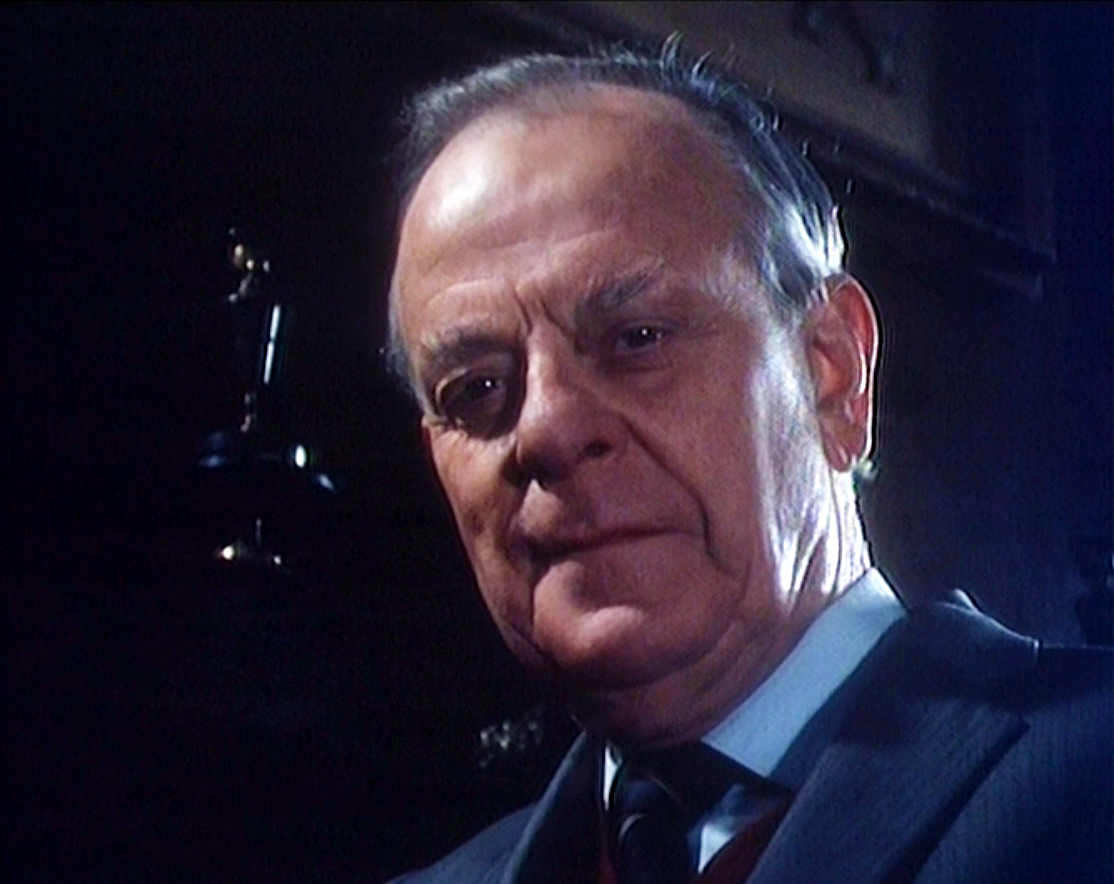
Lamble in The Optimist, 1984

Lloyd Nelson Lamble (8 February 1914 – 17 March 2008) was an Australian actor who worked in theatre, television, radio and film. He lived and worked for most of his life in the United Kingdom.

== Biography ==
=== Personal life ===
Lloyd Lamble was born in Melbourne, Victoria, to William Henry Sylvester Lamble and Francis Alma Spencer Lamble (née Potter). He was the youngest of four children, all boys. His father William Lamble was a viola player in the Sisserman String Quartet and in symphony orchestras in Melbourne; secretary of the Musicians' Union of Australia; a music teacher, pianist, organist, choirmaster and composer. His grandfather was a music professor.

Lloyd was married three times in Australia. His first marriage in 1937 to Marjorie Ellerton Barrett (1913–1978) ended in divorce in 1943. His second marriage in 1945 to (Doris) Barbara Smith (1911–2010) also ended in divorce in 1948, though they had two children together. His third marriage was in 1949 to actress Lesley Jackson (1918-2011). Lloyd and Lesley adopted two children and remained together for over 60 years.

Lamble was president of Actors Equity of Australia from 1942 to 1948.

In the early 1950s, Lloyd could not get acting work. After a year of selling clothing door-to-door to survive, he left Australia to live the rest of his life in Britain.

He donated a copy of his 1994 unpublished autobiography to the National Library of Australia. The book reveals that he was not satisfied with his personal or professional achievements, despite his obvious talents and successes.

=== Early career in Australia ===
Before his voice broke, Lloyd Lamble became ‘head boy’ in the choir of All Saints' Church St Kilda, Melbourne and that gained him a scholarship for Wesley College, Melbourne. His academic record was not outstanding, though he was a keen swimmer and gymnast.

At the age of 17, Lamble became a junior radio announcer for Melbourne commercial radio station 3DB – a post he describes as ‘little more than an office boy’. Senior announcing jobs followed at 3KZ and 3AW. At this time he also did some dance-hall crooning.

His professional stage career started in 1934 when he was chosen for the lead juvenile role in J.C. Williamson’s production of Fresh Fields. Two years later he played the role of Danny, a psychotic murderous Welsh pageboy, in Night Must Fall.

While working at 3AW, he began performing with the Lee Murray Radio Players, establishing his career as a radio actor. He also worked in comedy, as a straight man to Roy Rene (‘Mo’) and as a host and comedic foil to Bob Dyer.

Lamble opened a successful school of radio and theatre acting in 1937: the ‘Radio-Theatre Guild’.

Lloyd's stage career developed fast in 1940 at Sydney’s Minerva Theatre, where he played parts that included: Malvolio in Twelfth Night, Lennie in Of Mice and Men and Shylock in The Merchant of Venice. He played 12 stage parts in that year and 35 in the 16 years between 1934 and 1950.

From 1936 to 1950 Lamble toured Australia and New Zealand as an actor and director. In 1944 he was leading man and producer in a six-play tour for J.C. Williamson’s in New Zealand. In 1945 he formed his own short-lived performing company – ‘L.L. Enterprises’ – and took plays on tour in Queensland, Australia.

Lloyd Lamble was well known in both the Australian Lux Radio Theatre and the Australian Macquarie Radio Theatre. His first play for Lux was in 1939. Soon he was highly sought after by other radio stations including the Australian Broadcasting Commission, and later the British Broadcasting Corporation.

In spite of Lloyd's political left-leanings, he was enlisted by the Australian government to read war propaganda on radio, probably for his strong voice that easily commanded authority.

Lloyd Lamble wrote several radio dramas, one of which is in the National Archives of Australia. In 1947, he won a Macquarie Award.

=== Career in the UK ===
One of Lamble's first acting roles in Britain was in 1952, playing in the comedy Curtain Up, alongside Margaret Rutherford and Robert Morley. Lamble had earlier toured with Morley in his native Australia. Throughout the rest of his life, he played hundreds of acting roles in Britain: on the stage, in radio, television and film.

Twice daily at the 1977 Edinburgh Festival, Lloyd performed two one-man plays as a double-bill, each running for over an hour. He is well-remembered for his many roles as authority figures, some of which were: Joyce Grenfell's police-superintendent-fiancée in the St. Trinian’s series; Quentin Crisp's father in The Naked Civil Servant; and Sir Oliver Surface in The School For Scandal.

In his seventies, Lamble appeared in a six-month season at the Scottish Dundee Repertory Theatre, where he played the leading role in four out of six repertory plays. He then played a long season in London's West End in the revival of Me and My Girl. One of his final acting roles was in the 1984 dialogue-free television comedy The Optimist.

=== Death ===
Lamble died in Falmouth, Cornwall on 17 March 2008, aged 94. His death was not announced until well into the April when his funeral also took place. He was survived by his third wife Lesley Jackson, his son Tim, his daughter Elizabeth, his son Lloyd Wallis Lamble, daughter Caroline, three grandchildren and one great-grandchild.

== Filmography ==
- Strong Is the Seed (1949) - Dr Guthrie
- Saturday Island (1952) - Officer of the Watch
- Curtain Up (1952) - Jackson
- Lady in the Fog (1952) - Martin Sorrowby
- Three Steps to the Gallows (1953) - James Smith - aka Charles Harris
- The Story of Gilbert and Sullivan (1953) - Joseph Bennett
- Appointment in London (1953) - Weather Man (uncredited)
- Mantrap (A.K.A. ' Man in Hiding ') (1953) - Inspector Frisnay
- Street Corner (1953) - Det Sgt Weston
- The Straw Man (1953) - Dr Canning
- Background (1953) - Defence counsel
- Forbidden Cargo (1954) - Captain of Python (uncredited)
- The Silent Witness (Scotland Yard (film series) (1954, short) - Doctor
- Fatal Journey (Scotland Yard (film series) (1954) - Detective
- Profile (1954) - Michael
- The Belles of St. Trinian's (1954) - Superintendent Kemp Bird
- The Green Carnation (1954) - Inspector Flynn
- Out of the Clouds (1955) - Ben Saunders, Flight Operations Officer, Cairo (uncredited)
- The Dam Busters (1955) - Collins (uncredited)
- Track the Man Down (1955) - Inspector Barnett
- The Blue Peter (1955) - Editor
- Private's Progress (1956) - Officer at Medical Hearing (uncredited)
- The Gelignite Gang (1956) - Detective Inspector Felby
- The Man Who Never Was (1956) - Passport Officer (uncredited)
- The Man Who Knew Too Much (1956) - General Manager of Albert Hall (uncredited)
- Person Unknown (Scotland Yard (film series) (1956) - Pathologist
- The Girl in the Picture (1957) - (uncredited)
- Suspended Alibi (1957) - Waller
- There's Always a Thursday (1957) - Detective Sgt Bolton
- Sea Wife (1957) - Captain 'San Felix'
- Quatermass 2 (1957) - Inspector
- These Dangerous Years (1957)
- Barnacle Bill (1957) (A.K.A. 'All at Sea') - Superintendent Browning
- Night of the Demon (1957) - Detective Simmons
- Blue Murder at St Trinian's (1957) - Superintendent Samuel Kemp-Bird
- The Man Who Wouldn't Talk (1958) - Bellamy
- Dunkirk (1958) - Staff Colonel
- Print of Death (Scotland Yard (film series) (1958) - Dr Turner
- The Bank Raiders (1958) - Det.Insp. Mason
- Breakout (1959) - Inspector
- Behemoth the Sea Monster (1959) - Admiral Summers (uncredited)
- No Trees in the Street (1959) - Police Superintendent
- The Heart of a Man (1959) - Police Inspector (uncredited)
- The Trials of Oscar Wilde (1960) - Charles Humphries
- The Challenge (1960) - Dr Westerly
- The Sundowners (1960) - Mr Bateman (uncredited)
- The Pure Hell of St Trinian's (1960) - Superintendent Samuel Kemp-Bird
- Term of Trial (1962) - Inspector Ullyat (uncredited)
- The Boys (1962) - Inspector Larner
- The Human Jungle ('The Vacant Chair ') (1963) - Basil Phillips
- Joey Boy (1965) - Sir John Averycorn
- And Now the Screaming Starts! (1973) - Sir John Westcliff
- No Sex Please, We're British (1973) - American Man
- On the Game (1974) - Gladstone
- Eskimo Nell (1975) - The Bishop
- The Naked Civil Servant (1975) - Mr Crisp
- Lady Killers (1981) - Dr. George Billing
