= The Green Carnation (film) =

1954 film

- Directed by: John Lemont
- Written by: Paul Erickson
- Produced by: William N. Boyle
- Starring: Wayne Morris; Mary Germaine; Marcia Ashton
- Cinematography: Basil Emmott
- Edited by: John Seabourne Sr.
- Music by: Lambert Williamson
- Production company: William N. Boyle Productions
- Distributed by: Republic Pictures
- Release date: 1 November 1954
- Running time: 62 minutes
- Country: United Kingdom
- Language: English

The Green Carnation (also known as The Green Buddha) is a 1954 British second feature ('B') crime film directed by John Lemont and starring Wayne Morris, Mary Germaine and Marcia Ashton. It was written by Paul Erickson and distributed by Republic Pictures

== Plot ==
A criminal gang steal a priceless green Buddha statuette from a London exhibition. When nightclub singer Vivien Blake's boyfriend Gary Holden is assaulted by one of the gang, they go in search of the thieves. Vivien is kidnapped, and the chase leads to Battersea Pleasure Gardens where two of the villains are killed. Gary and Vivien receive a reward.

== Cast ==
- Wayne Morris as Gary Holden
- Mary Germaine as Vivien Blake
- Marcia Ashton as Susie
- Mary Merrall as Mrs. Rydon-Smith
- Walter Rilla as Frank Olsen
- Leslie Linder as Henry Marsh
- Percy Herbert as Casey O'Rourke
- Wolf Frees as Tony Scott
- Kenneth Griffith as Nobby
- Victor Platt as George De Carlo
- Arnold Marlé as Vittorio Miranda
- Lloyd Lamble as Inspector Flynn
- George Woodbridge as farmer
- Frank Atkinson as lift operator
- Bartlett Mullins as gallery official
- Dan Lester as hall porter

== Production ==
The film's sets were designed by John Stoll.

== Reception ==
The Monthly Film Bulletin wrote: "An involved but exuberant penny-dreadful thriller."

Kine Weekly wrote: "Nutshell crime melodrama, describing a desperate fight among crooks for a rare Buddha. Its leading characters occasionally trip over each other, but a wide variety of London and country backgrounds partly atones for an over-crowded plot. Nothing if not eventful, it'll keep the middiebrows on the qui vive. ... The picture tells a very involved story, but its constant change of scene gives colour, if not complete conviction, to its rough stuff. Wayne Morris, the American star, makes the most of a far from flattering role as Gary, Mary Germaine pleases as Vivien, and Walter Rilla contributes a polished cameo as the wily Olsen."

Picturegoer wrote: "Wayne Morris, as tough and taciturn as ever, makes good in this rather indifferent crime melodrama."

Leslie Halliwell wrote "Fair second feature thick-ear."

In British Sound Films: The Studio Years 1928–1959 David Quinlan rated the film as "mediocre", writing: "What seems to be a quadruple cross is the only new element in this very familiar-looking material."
