= The Man Who Liked Funerals =

1959 British film by David Eady

- DVD cover
- Directed by: David Eady
- Written by: Margot Bennett; Cecily Finn; Joan O'Connor
- Produced by: Jon Penington
- Starring: Leslie Phillips; Susan Beaumont; Bill Fraser
- Cinematography: Eric Cross
- Edited by: John Seabourne
- Music by: Edwin Astley
- Production company: Penington Eady Productions
- Distributed by: J. Arthur Rank Film Distributors (UK)
- Release date: 1958 (UK)
- Running time: 59m 29s
- Country: United Kingdom
- Language: English

The Man Who Liked Funerals is a 1958 British 'B' comedy film directed by David Eady and starring Leslie Phillips, Susan Beaumont and Bill Fraser. It was written by Margot Bennett, Cecily Finn and Joan O'Connor.

== Synopsis ==
In order to help a youth club which is under threat of closure, a man begins attending funerals where he blackmails the relatives of the recently deceased, threatening to publish incriminating stories about them. However, his plans encounter problems when he tries to blackmail the family of a prominent villain.

== Cast ==
- Leslie Phillips as Simon Hurd
- Susan Beaumont as Stella
- Bill Fraser as Jeremy Bentham
- Thelma Ruby as junior mistress
- Mary Mackenzie as Hester Waring
- Paul Stassino as Nick Morelli
- Jimmy Thompson as Lieutenant Hunter
- Charles Clay as Colonel Hunter
- Anita Sharp-Bolster as Lady Hunter
- Shaun O'Riordan as Reverend Pitt
- Marianne Stone as Bentham's secretary

== Critical reception ==
Monthly Film Bulletin said "This tepid farce fails to live up to the promise of either its original idea or the intriguing title. The direction is shaky, the dialogue amateurish, and several of the actors appear in a state of muted panic."

In British Sound Films: The Studio Years 1928–1959 David Quinlan rated the film as "mediocre", writing: "Delightful idea given heavy-handed treatment."

The Radio Times Guide to Films gave the film 2/5 stars, writing: "Leslie Phillips landed his first starring role in this brisk B-picture. Reining in the trademark charm, he plays a printer who attempts to fill the coffers of a struggling boys' club by blackmailing the relatives of recently departed bigwigs, whose scandalous (albeit forged) memoirs he threatens to publish. However, it all goes horribly wrong when he picks on the family of a notorious gangster. The film is nothing to get excited about, but it does raise the odd smile."

The film was one of 15 films selected by Steve Chibnall and Brian McFarlane in The British 'B' Film, as among the most meritorious of the B films made in Britain between World War II and 1970. They describe it as "fresh and gently funny", "consistently amusing, its plot worked out with some wit" and add that "its cast, amiably led by Phillips at the start of his starring career, enters into the spirit of the joke".
