= Innocent Meeting =

1958 British film by Godfrey Grayson

- Theatrical release poster
- Directed by: Godfrey Grayson
- Written by: Brian Clemens
- Produced by: Edward J. Danziger; Harry Lee Danziger
- Starring: Sean Lynch; Beth Rogan; Raymond Huntley
- Release date: 1958
- Country: United Kingdom
- Language: English

Innocent Meeting is a 1958 British crime film directed by Godfrey Grayson and starring Sean Lynch, Beth Rogan and Raymond Huntley. It was written by Brian Clemens and produced by The Danzigers.

== Plot ==
Johnny Brent is a young man on probation after a first conviction for petty theft. Attempting to reform his life, he meets and falls in love with Connie Phillips, the daughter of a middle-class textile company owner, Harold Phillips.

Johnny finds employment at Connie’s father's firm, keeping his criminal past a secret to maintain his new social standing and relationship. However, his employer's wallet goes missing and, because of his history, Johnny is suspected of theft. Panic-stricken and fearing that his past has finally caught up with him, he flees, which further implicates him in the eyes of the law and Connie's family.

Johnny returns to his old criminal companions and commits an armed robbery, before a shoot-out with police. Connie goes to him, and he surrenders when the truth behind the missing wallet is revealed.

== Cast ==
- Sean Lynch as Johnny Brent
- Beth Rogan as Connie
- Raymond Huntley as Harold
- Ian Fleming as Garside
- Howard Lang as Macey
- Arnold Bell as Fry
- Colin Tapley as Stannard
- Robert Raglan as Martin
- Denis Shaw as Uncle
- Hal Osmond as shopkeeper

== Critical reception ==
The Monthly Film Bulletin wrote: "This routine crime tale combines a certain amount of realism (mainly in settings rather than characterisation) with a larger amount of unlikely motivation. The boy does not convince: he is stated to be of above average intelligence, yet seems habitually to act with crass stupidity. Despite three credits for the music score, the main role is taken by Tchaikovsky's 6th Symphony, which is vaguely connected with the story."

Picturegoer wrote: "Chalk up two exciting new names in British films. Sean Lynch and Beth Rogan are a twosome to remember – even though you could easily forget this tearstained sob story. ... But Lynch is a newcomer who gets beyond the sideboards and suede shoes caricature. And the girl has a controlled warmth, reminiscent of Janet Munro which should quickly take her to better roles."

Picture Show wrote: "Sensitively acted and directed."
