= Kay Callard =

Canadian actress (1923–2008)

- Born: Kathleen Emmett Callard; 10 November 1923; Toronto, Ontario, Canada
- Died: 7 March 2008 (aged 84); Peterborough, Cambridgeshire, England
- Other names: Kathleen (Kay) Drewry; Kathleen (Kay) McNaughton
- Occupation: Film actress
- Years active: 1954–1993
- Spouse: Jack McNaughton (m. 1959; died 1990)

Kay Callard (10 November 1923 – 7 March 2008) was a Canadian film and television actress whose career was largely based in Britain. She was married to the actor Jack McNaughton.

The most active part of her career was 1953–1961. In 1956 she was signed as the first contract artist to Anglo-Amalgamated Productions.

== Filmography ==
Year	Title	Role
1953	The Limping Man	
1954	They Who Dare	nightclub singer
1954	A Stranger Came Home	Jennie
1955	Reluctant Bride	Lola Sinclair
1955	Stolen Assignment	Stella Watson
1955	Joe MacBeth	Ruth
1955	Dial 999	blonde at bar
1955	Assignment Abroad	Mrs. Morgan
1956	Find the Lady	Rita
1957	West of Suez	Pat Paterson
1957	The Hypnotist	Susie
1957	The Flying Scot	Jackie
1957	Man in the Shadow	Pamela Norris
1958	Undercover Girl	Joan Foster
1957	Cat Girl	Dorothy Marlowe
1958	Escapement	Laura Maxwell
1958	Intent to Kill	Carol's friend
1958	Woman Possessed	Ann
1958	Links of Justice	Stella
1959	The Great Van Robbery	Ella
1959	Top Floor Girl	Connie
1961	Freedom to Die	Coral
1974	Our Cissy (short film)	middle class lady

== Television appearances ==
Year	Title	Role
1953	BBC Sunday-Night Theatre, "Once in a Lifetime"	Phyllis Fontaine
1954	Rheingold Theatre, "Dream Stuff"	Candy
1954	Craig's Wife	Ethel
1954	They Who Dare	nightclub singer
1955–1959	The Vise, 13 episodes: S1.E16, "The Final Column" (1955), Marie; S1.E23, "Dress Rehearsal" (1955), Betty; S1.E39, "The Better Chance" (1955), Penny; S2.E9, "Never Let Me Die" (1955), Dorothy; S2.E10, "Bond of Hate" (1955), Alice Bodmin; S2.E17, "Death Takes No Holiday" (1955), June; S3.E8, "Blood in the Sky" (1956), Julia; S3.E23, "Shroud for a Lady" (1959), Deborah; S3.E24, "It's Only Mink" (1959), Carol; S5.E19, "Six Months to Talk" (1958), Diane; S5.E20, "Four Against Three" (1958), Anna Henderson; S6.E8, "A Toast to Death" (1958), Sylvia Holloway; S5.E20, "Dangerous Meeting" (1959), Tina	various
1955	Secret File, USA, "Mission Assassin"	Mrs Morgan
1956	ITV Play of the Week, "The Adding Machine"	June O'Grady
1957	The New Adventures of Martin Kane, "The Missing Daughter Story"	
1957	The New Adventures of Charlie Chan, "The Airport Murder Case"	Carol Vane
1958	ITV Play of the Week, "Johnny Belinda"	Stell Maguire
1958	White Hunter, "The Marked Man"	Helen Porter
1958	Target, "Temporary Escape"	Kay Johnson
1958	Charlie Drake, "The Clapper Boy"	
1958	ITV Television Playhouse, "High Tension"	Georgia Gillum
1959	ITV Television Playhouse, "Rock-a-bye Barnie"	Sonya
1959	The Four Just Men, "The Judge"	Jean Lawson
1959	Rendezvous, "Markheim" / "Alfie's Tulip"	Carla / Mrs Ben
1959–1960	Knight Errant Limited, 38 episodes	Liz Parrish
1960	International Detective, "The Daniels Case"	Hester Putnam
1963	The Odd Man, "Prince on a White Horse"	Minerva Dane
1993	Riders (TV movie)	Nanny Campbell-Black
