= Parent-Craft =

1951 British TV comedy series

Parent-Craft is a British television programme that aired on the BBC in 1951. It was a fortnightly comedy series. It starred Janet Burnell, William Mervyn, Shirley Eaton, James Fox, and Robert Morley. The series is missing, believed lost. All shows aired live, and while the ability to record live television was developed by late 1947, the technology wasn't considered of acceptable quality by the BBC until around the mid-1950s.
