= Track the Man Down =

1955 film

- Original window card
- Directed by: R. G. Springsteen
- Written by: Paul Erickson
- Produced by: William N. Boyle
- Starring: Kent Taylor; Petula Clark; George Rose
- Cinematography: Basil Emmott
- Edited by: John Seabourne
- Music by: Lambert Williamson
- Distributed by: Republic Pictures
- Release dates: 6 June 1955 (UK); 27 January 1956 (US)
- Running time: 75 minutes
- Country: United Kingdom
- Language: English

Track the Man Down is a 1955 British black and white "B" crime film directed by R. G. Springsteen, starring Kent Taylor, Petula Clark, and George Rose. It was written by Paul Erickson.

== Plot ==
A robbery at a greyhound racetrack results in the unintentional murder of a guard. The perpetrator leaves the loot with his girl friend, commandeers a motorcoach bound for Southampton, and holds hostage its diverse array of passengers, including an American newspaper reporter and the girl friend's resourceful sister.

== Cast ==
- Kent Taylor as John Ford
- Petula Clark as June Dennis
- George Rose as Rick Lambert
- Kenneth Griffith as Ken Orwell
- Ursula Howells as Mary Dennis
- Walter Rilla as Austin Melford
- Renée Houston as Pat Sherwood
- Lloyd Lamble as Inspector Barnett
- Richard Molinas as Luis Remino

== Production ==
The film, the second made by Republic Pictures' British production company, was made at Walton Studios with sets designed by the art director John Stoll. Location shooting was at London's Victoria Station and along the banks of the River Thames.

== Critical reception ==
In a contemporary review Monthly Film Bulletin said "The story is not so much complicated as cluttered up by the introduction of too many characters; it is in any event a hackneyed and unexciting affair, having little to recommend it."

Picturegoer wrote: "Dishevelled, romantic crime melodrama about a brash reporter who luckily gets a scoop on a hunted man while trying to interview a temperamental actress. Much of the action takes glace on a coach bound for Southampton. But, unfortunately, many of the characters, although portrayed by popular and competent players, are little more than passengers."

Picture Show wrote: "'Well-made thriller telling how a reporter and his girl-friend thwart the plans of a killer, in his attempt to make a get-away, when he commandeers a coach filled with passengers whom he holds captive. Briskly told and effectively acted, starring Kent Taylor and Petula Clark, while Renee Houston gives a delightful comedy performance as an actress."

The Daily Film Renter wrote: "Forthright melodramatic elements, light hearted comedy threads, diverse backgrounds. ... Acceptable British offering for industrial bills."

In British Sound Films: The Studio Years 1928–1959 David Quinlan rated the film as "poor", writing: "Fragmented, silly thriller; a few unintentional laughs. Virtually the end of Petula Clark's British screen career."
