= Max Varnel =

French film director (1925–1996)

- Born: Max Le Bozec; 21 March 1925; Paris, France
- Died: 15 January 1996 (aged 70); Sydney, New South Wales, Australia
- Occupations: Film and television director
- Spouse: Gillian Varnel
- Children: Simonne Varnel and Marcel Varnel

Max Varnel (21 March 1925 – 15 January 1996) was a French-born Australian film and television director who worked primarily in the United Kingdom and Australia.

== Biography ==
Born Max Le Bozec in Paris, France, he was the son of the film director Marcel Varnel. He began his career as an assistant director of The Magic Box (1951) and continued in this role for films including The Card (1952), Devil Girl from Mars (1954) and The Cockleshell Heroes (1955)

His directing credits encompass a series of B movies, including Moment of Indiscretion (1958), A Woman Possessed (1958), Top Floor Girl (1959), Web of Suspicion (1959), The Child and the Killer (1959), and Crash Drive (1959).

Varnel's television credits include The Vise, The Cheaters, Softly Softly, and The Troubleshooters in the UK, and Skippy, Glenview High, The Young Doctors, and Neighbours in Australia, where he emigrated in the late 1960s.

Varnel died of a heart attack in Sydney at the age of 70.

== Filmography (as director) ==
- A Woman Possessed (1958)
- Moment of Indiscretion (1958)
- Links of Justice (1958)
- The Great Van Robbery (1959)
- The Child and the Killer (1959)
- No Safety Ahead (1959)
- Web of Suspicion (1959)
- Top Floor Girl (1959)
- Crash Drive (1959)
- Sentenced for Life (1960)
- A Taste of Money (1961)
- A Question of Suspense (1961)
- Fate Takes a Hand (1961)
- Return of a Stranger (1961)
- Part-Time Wife (1961)
- Enter Inspector Duval (1961)
- Murder in Eden (1961)
- The Silent Invasion (1962)
- Mrs. Gibbons' Boys (1962)
- The Rivals (1964)
