= Totti Truman Taylor =

British actress (1915–1981)

Totti Truman Taylor in TV's Scotland Yard, episode: The Lonely House (1957)

Totti Truman Taylor (born Dorothy Leah Truman, 7 September 1915 – 5 March 1981) was a British actress. She took her stage name from her mother’s second husband’s surname. In 1953, she played Aunt Sally in the BBC television series Worzel Gummidge Turns Detective. She also played various roles in Hancock's Half Hour.

Truman Taylor was born in the Mapperley Park area of Nottingham, and died at Denville Hall, Northwood in Middlesex, on 5 March 1981, at the age of 65.

== Selected filmography ==
- Passenger to Tokyo (Scotland Yard (film series)) (1954) Ser. 1 Ep. 10 as Headmistress
- Eight O'Clock Walk (1954) as Miss Ribden-White
- The Crowded Day (1954) as Ernest's wife
- The French, They Are a Funny Race (1955) as Miss Fyfyth, the nurse
- Not So Dusty (1956) as Charlotte Duncan
- Town on Trial (1957)
- Passenger to Tokyo (1957) Scotland Yard (film series)
- Rx Murder (1958)
- Undercover Girl (1958)
- Them Nice Americans (1958)
- Moment of Indiscretion (1958)
- There Was a Crooked Man (1960) as woman in a taxi
- Compelled (1960) as lady
- The Gentle Terror (1961) as Mrs. Connor
- Crooks Anonymous (1962)
- Band of Thieves (1962)
- A Stitch in Time (1963) as rich woman throwing a bracelet
- Delayed Flight (1964) as doctor
- The Wrong Box (1966) as lady at launching
- Press for Time (1966) as Mrs. Doe Connor
- Chitty Chitty Bang Bang (1968) as duchess
- A Nice Girl Like Me (1969) as Miss Charter
- Confessions of a Window Cleaner (1974) as elderly lady
