= Albert Elms =

English composer

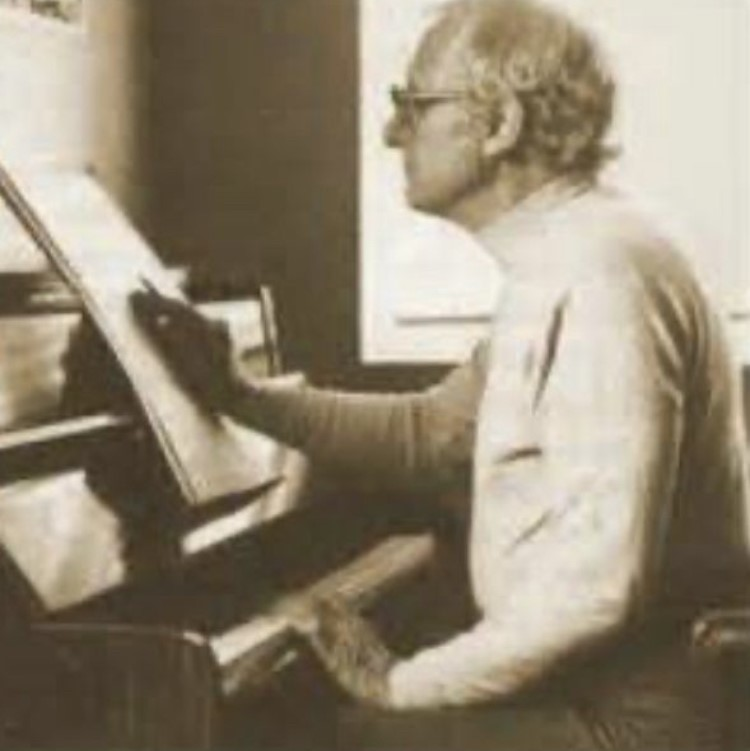
Albert Elms

Albert Elms (28 February 1920 – 14 October 2009) was an English composer and arranger who worked mainly for television and film.

Albert Elms was born in Newington, Kent, England, and died in Southampton. His love of music drove him to join the Royal Marine Band Service in Deal at the age of 14 in 1934. His wartime service included participation in the Vaagso raid in 1940 and serving on the Malta Convoys from 1941 to 1942.

After Albert left the Royal Marines he joined Francis, Day and Hunter, a music publishing company as an arranger. His break into television came with the launch of commercial television in Britain during 1955. He was amongst a number of young British composers who made significant contributions to the early days of commercial television in series like ITV's The Adventures of Robin Hood (1955–59) with Richard Greene in the lead, in which he wrote then musical scores for at least the last two series. He also wrote musical scores for The Buccaneers (1956–57), starring Robert Shaw, The Adventures of Sir Lancelot (1956–57), starring William Russell, and Ivanhoe (1958–59) with Roger Moore. However, he is best known for providing the incidental music for the later ITC series A Man in a Suitcase (1967–68), The Champions (1968–69) and for 14 of the 17 episodes of The Prisoner (1967–68) starring Patrick McGoohan.

Although the series on which Albert did most of his important work had memorable main title scores by others like Ron Grainer and Tony Hatch, he provided cues which represent hundreds of hours of music. His contribution has recently been recognised with the release on CD of his incidental music for Man in a Suitcase.

He also wrote complete film scores for movies such as Satellite in the Sky (1956), The Man Without a Body (1957), On the Run (1958), Bluebeard's Ten Honeymoons (1960), The Breaking Point (1961), The Omegans (1968), and the film version of Love Thy Neighbour (1973).

He was also musical director on the Dave Allen Show and The Benny Hill Show for three episodes of the 1973–74 season, substituting for Ronnie Aldrich. He wrote extensively for military band which included the Corps quick march, On Parade, for The Royal Logistic Corps which formed in 1993. He was commissioned to compose the grand finale for the Royal Tournament in 1974, and his work the Battle of Trafalgar was a sensational success. It subsequently included commentary by Richard Baker and was a popular concert inclusion. He was asked to arrange it for full orchestra and it was performed in 1983 at the ‘Celebration of Maritime England’ in St Paul's Cathedral and conducted by Sir Charles Groves.

Elms lived for more than 40 years at the family home in the village of Oad Street near Borden, Sittingbourne in Kent, and had three sons, Martin, David, and Jeremy. His wife Doreen (known as Jo) predeceased him on 10 May 1990.
