= Angela Crow =

British television actor (1935–2022)

- Born: 13 December 1935; Wharfedale, Yorkshire, England
- Died: 3 March 2022 (aged 86); Bradford, Yorkshire, England
- Occupation: Actress
- Years active: 1956–2005
- Spouse: Michael Woods

Angela Rosemary Crow (13 December 1935 – 3 March 2022) was an English television actress, best known for her appearance in the early days of British soap opera Coronation Street, as factory worker Doreen Lostock, between 1961 and 1963.

== Early life ==
Crow trained at RADA, and following her graduation in 1954, toured in companies appearing in provincial theatres, as well as the Edinburgh Festival.

== Career ==
=== Early career ===
Crow appeared in television programmes such as Hancock's Half Hour, BBC Sunday Night Theatre and a 1960 adaption of the Charles Dickens novel, Barnaby Rudge.

=== Coronation Street ===
In 1960, Crow was cast as ditzy factory worker Doreen Lostock in the newly-commissioned ITV soap opera, Coronation Street. Crow appeared for two years from 1961, but was absent for most of 1962 due to the Equity Actor's Strike. The character reappeared in June of that year, before departing for good in October 1963. During her tenure, her character had a relationship with Billy Walker (Ken Farrington), son of popular long-standing character Annie (Doris Speed).

The character of Doreen had a particularly good friendship with fellow factory worker Sheila Birtles (Eileen Mayers). This friendship proved popular with the public, and served as a basis for the friendships of future young characters.

Forty-nine years later, Crow appeared in the 2012 documentary The Corrie Years to discuss her experience on the show.

=== Later career ===
After leaving Coronation Street, Crow appeared in various popular television shows. One of which was the Street spin-off, Pardon the Expression, in which Crow played shop assistant Miss Clapper. Ironically, the character worked under Arthur Lowe's character Leonard Swindley, who had been the boss of Crow's character when she was on Coronation Street.

Other appearances include Dixon of Dock Green, Last of the Summer Wine, Love Thy Neighbour, Grange Hill and Heartbeat.

== Selected filmography ==
Year	Title	Role	Notes
1957	Hancock's Half Hour	Housemaid	
1958, 1959	BBC Sunday Night Theatre	Doll Simmons; Patricia Smith	
1960	Barnaby Rudge	Betsy	6 episodes
1961–1963	Coronation Street	Doreen Lostock	Regular role; 145 episodes
1966	Pardon the Expression	Miss Clapper	
1971	Dixon of Dock Green	June Green	
1973, 1975, 1976	Crown Court	Rachel Mackintosh; Ethel Flynn; Jane Page	3 episodes 2 episodes 1 episode
1975	Last of the Summer Wine	Gloria	
1974–1975	Love Thy Neighbour	Sheila Garside	2 episodes
1979	Leave it to Charlie	Beryl Butterworth	2 episodes
1988–1990	Grange Hill	Mrs. Birtles	Recurring role; 8 episodes
1988	Jack the Ripper (miniseries)	TV-miniseries	Elizabeth Stride
1995, 2002	Heartbeat	Lily Conway; Rose Protheroe	2 episodes
1996	Casualty	Jean Chesham	
2005	The Royal	Mabel	
