= Basil Boothroyd =

English humorist (1910–1988)

John Basil Boothroyd
- Born: 4 March 1910; Worksop, England
- Died: 27 February 1988 (aged 77)
- Education: Lincoln Cathedral Choir School Lincoln School
- Occupations: Humorous writer, journalist, broadcaster
- Spouse(s): Phyllis Youngman (m. 1939; died 1980) June Mortimer (m. 1981)
- Children: 1

John Basil Boothroyd (also known as J. B. Boothroyd; 4 March 1910 – 27 February 1988) was an English humorous writer, best known for his long association with Punch. As a young man he worked for a bank, but began contributing articles to Punch, and became its assistant editor, a post in which he served for eighteen years. His career as a writer for Punch spanned the editorships of E. V. Knox to Alan Coren. Boothroyd's chief literary work outside the comic essay was an official biography of Prince Philip undertaken at the request of its subject. Boothroyd also wrote for television and radio, and was a frequent broadcaster.

== Biography ==
Boothroyd was born in Worksop, England, son of James and Sarah Jackson Boothroyd (née Binch). He later said of his birthplace,

You can either call it the middle of the Nottinghamshire coalfield or the beautiful Sherwood Forest according to what sort of article you are writing.

James Boothroyd was a man of diverse trades, whom Boothroyd later remembered accompanying on clock-winding visits to great houses. Boothroyd was educated at Lincoln Cathedral Choir School and Lincoln School. In 1927 he became a bank clerk (it was later a source of pleasure to him that P G Wodehouse had started his working career similarly) and in his spare time he played the saxophone in a band called 'The Synco Peppers' and was a part-time repertory actor for the St Pancras People's Theatre.

While still working as a bank clerk he started writing for Punch in 1938, and during World War II he continued to contribute, using his experiences in the RAF as source material. At first he was an instructor in the RAF Police and was later commissioned, becoming personal assistant to the provost marshal. He was demobilised in 1946 with the rank of flight lieutenant. His books about service life included Home Guard Goings-On, Adastral Bodies, Are Sergeants Human? and Are Officers Necessary?

Back in civilian life, he resumed his double-harness career with the bank and Punch, but in 1952 he was appointed full-time assistant editor of the magazine. Malcolm Muggeridge who became editor in 1953 insisted on a less cosy style of writing ("No more articles about Celia and the washing-up"), and Boothroyd, according to The Times "chafed at … having to mount an attack on people whose only offence was to have been in the headlines that week, and much preferred chronicling the waywardness of common things or the vagaries of commuting."

In 1970 Boothroyd, was invited to write an official biography of the Duke of Edinburgh. It was the duke who suggested Boothroyd for the job, on the strength of a recent Punch profile. The Times said of the biography Philip, published in 1971, that it was "lightly and elegantly written, the quality of the research being in no way concealed by the occasionally frivolous detail."

Boothroyd had a long connection with the BBC writing radio comedy, including a series for Ian Carmichael and Charlotte Mitchell, The Small, Intricate Life of Gerald C Potter, which ran from 1975 to 1981, and was still receiving repeat broadcasts in 2022. He also wrote for television, including adaptations of George and Weedon Grossmith's Diary of a Nobody in 1979 and H F Ellis's A J Wentworth, BA, in 1982. He was a frequent after-dinner speaker, and in 1973–74 was speechwriter to Sir Hugh Wontner, Lord Mayor of London. In 1987 he published his autobiography, A Shoulder To Laugh On.

Boothroyd married Phyllis Barbara Youngman in June 1939. She died in 1980 and he married June Elizabeth Leonhardt Mortimer in 1981. There was one son of the first marriage.

== Reputation ==
In an obituary tribute, Alan Coren said of Boothroyd:

He was probably the most professional writer I have ever known; and consequently both the most self-punishing and the least self-satisfied. Few have worked harder to make a sentence right, or to conceal the effort that had made it so, few have truffled longer or deeper in our bottomless vocabulary for the one word which would corral the elusive thought, and very few indeed have sat like him, staring at a typed semi-colon for half an hour and deliberating whether or not a full colon might produce a more effective pause. Then coming back two hours later and making it a comma … It prevented him from writing novels – "I might spend the rest of my life re-polishing the first thousand words".

P. G. Wodehouse said of Boothroyd, "There are very few humorists you can rely on to be funny every time. In fact I can think of only one. He is a writer of whom I never miss a word."

== Books ==
Boothroyd published eighteen books between 1941 and 1987, mostly collections of his Punch articles, together with his biography of Prince Philip and his autobiography.

- Home Guard Goings-on or the London charivari, 1940–1941. G. Allen & Unwin ltd. 1941.
- Adastral Bodies 1942
- Are Sergeants Human?. G. Allen & Unwin Ltd. 1945.
- Are Officers Necessary?. G. Allen & Unwin. 1946.
- Lost: A Double-Fronted Shop. George Allen & Unwin. 1947.
- The Pick of Punch. Chatto and Windus. 1952.
- The House about a Man. G. Allen & Unwin. 1959.
- Motor If You Must. G. Allen & Unwin. 1960.
- To My Embarrassment, 1961
- The Whole Thing's Laughable, 1964
- You Can't Be Serious, 1967
- Let's Stay Married. Simon and Schuster. 1967.
- Stay Married Abroad, 1968
- Boothroyd at Bay: Some Radio Talks, 1970
- Philip: An Informal Biography. Longman. 1971.
- Accustomed as I Am: The Loneliness of the Long Distance Speaker. Allen and Unwin. 1975. ISBN 978-0-04-808022-6.
- Let's Move House. Allen and Unwin. 1977. ISBN 978-0-04-827015-3.
- In My State of Health. Robson. 1981. ISBN 978-0-86051-148-9.
- A Shoulder to Laugh On. Robson Books. 1987. ISBN 978-0-86051-393-3.
