= Turn Out the Lights (TV series) =

1967 British sitcom

- Genre: Sitcom
- Starring: Arthur Lowe; Robert Dorning
- No. of series: 1
- No. of episodes: 6

Production
- Producer: Derek Granger
- Running time: 55 minutes
- Production company: Granada Television

Original release
- Network: ITV
- Release: 2 January – 6 February 1967

Turn out the Lights is an ITV sitcom series made by Granada Television, that was first broadcast from Monday 2 January to Monday 6 February 1967 by Rediffusion London and Tyne Tees Television, (all other regions broadcast the series between Friday 6 January and Friday 10 February 1967). The series was a spin-off from the sitcom Pardon the Expression, itself a spin-off from the highly popular soap opera Coronation Street.

== Synopsis ==
Leonard Swindley played by Arthur Lowe was the central character, along with Wally Hunt (played by Robert Dorning). Swindley was formerly the manager of the fashion retail store Gamma Garments in Coronation Street and the deputy manager of the department store Dobson and Hawks in Pardon the Expression: in this series, he becomes a professional speaker on astrology who encounters various supernatural events on his travels around the country, along with his colleague Wally Hunt, after they were both fired from Dobson and Hawks in the final episode of Pardon the Expression.

== Production ==
The series directors were David Boisseau and Michael Cox, production designers were Dennis Parkin and Roy Stonehouse. The series was not recorded in front of a studio audience and had no laughter-track.

== Episodes ==
No.	Title	Original release date
1	"The Boyhood Haunt"	2 January 1967
2	"Hail to Thee, Aunt Shelmadine"	9 January 1967
3	"A Big Hand for a Little Lady"	16 January 1967
4	"The Happy Medium"	23 January 1967
5	"You Can't Get the Wood"	30 January 1967
6	"One for Yes, Two for No"	6 February 1967
