= A.J. Wentworth, B.A. =

- Genre: Sitcom
- Created by: H. F. Ellis
- Written by: Basil Boothroyd
- Directed by: Michael Mills
- Starring: Arthur Lowe; Marion Mathie; Harry Andrews; Ronnie Stevens; Michael Bevis; Deddie Davies
- Country of origin: United Kingdom
- No. of episodes: 6

Production
- Running time: 30 minutes
- Production company: Thames Television

Original release
- Network: ITV
- Release: 12 July – 16 August 1982

A.J. Wentworth, B.A. is a British sitcom that aired on ITV in 1982. Set in the 1940s, the programme was shown posthumously following the death of its lead actor Arthur Lowe, who died on 15 April 1982. Based on the writings of H. F. Ellis, A.J. Wentworth, B.A. was written by Basil Boothroyd. It was made for the ITV network by Thames Television.

== Plot ==
A.J. Wentworth, B.A. is set in the 1940s at Burgrove, a boys' preparatory school in Wilminister, in rural England. A.J. Wentworth is the mathematics master. He is very fond of the school but inefficient at disciplining his pupils who take advantage of his kind but haphazard nature. As in the books, Wentworth has very little self-awareness. The headmaster, the Rev Saunders, who is nicknamed 'Squid' by the boys, is a snob and the Matron is Wentworth's constant enemy.

== Cast ==
- Arthur Lowe as Mr Arthur James Wentworth, BA (Cantab)
- Harry Andrews as The Rev. R Gregory Saunders, MA (Oxon)
- Marion Mathie as Matron
- Deddie Davies as Miss Coombes
- Ronnie Stevens as Rawlinson
- Michael Bevis as Gilbert
- Marcus Evans as Mason
- Alistair Callender as Anderson
- Stephen Rooney as Atkins
- Andrew McDonnell as Etheridge
- Michael Underwood as Hillman
- Paul Hawkins as Hopgood II
- Simon Curry as Otterway
- Halil Halil as Sapoulos
- Benjamin Taylor as Trench

== Production ==
=== Development ===
A.J. Wentworth, B.A. was adapted from the writings of H. F. Ellis, which first appeared in Punch. They were later published in two books, The Papers of A.J. Wentworth, B.A. and The Papers of A.J. Wentworth, B.A. (Ret'd), that were first published in 1949 and 1962 respectively. Arthur Lowe had also read out selections from the books in the daily literacy slot of Woman's Hour.

A piece from A.J. Wentworth, B.A. was read out by Harry Andrews, who played the headmaster, at Arthur Lowe's memorial service.

=== Locations ===
The exterior location filming of the school took place at Box Hill School near Dorking in Surrey. In the opening credits, the junior pupils took part.

== Episodes ==
No.	Title	Directed by	Written by	Original release date
1	"A Day in the Life of..."	Michael Mills	Basil Boothroyd	12 July 1982
The basket in the boot-room, the disagreement with IIIA over Pythagoras, the interruptions, the upset to Miss Coombes, and a light scolding from the headmaster: all in a day's work for A.J. Wentworth.
2	"Mud Larks"	Michael Mills	Basil Boothroyd	19 July 1982
It's difficult to keep boys out of mud if they are left to their own devices and, with Wentworth in charge of the botany ramble, they revert to type. The headmaster is appalled at the condition of Form IIIA on their return.
3	"Problems, Problems"	Michael Mills	Basil Boothroyd	26 July 1982
A diverse day for Wentworth as he has an argument with Matron over a sock. And then there's Little Johnny and the Headmaster's maidenhair fern, not to mention the incident with Mrs. Carter.
4	"IIIA Goes to War"	Michael Mills	Basil Boothroyd	2 August 1982
The headmaster begins to worry about Wentworth's mental state when Form IIIA impersonate the Hitler Youth. His doubts are further strengthened by Wentworth's message after finding a pigeon in his desk.
5	"Founder's Day"	Michael Mills	Basil Boothroyd	9 August 1982
Founder's Day is the biggest event in the school calendar, but Wentworth may still encounter difficulties.
6	"The Outsider"	Michael Mills	Basil Boothroyd	16 August 1982
Major Faggott, Mr. Rawlinson's temporary replacement, arrives at Burgrove and his appearance annoys Wentworth. But when A.J.'s umbrella sets off the fire alarm, he has difficulty explaining what he's doing in Matron's bedroom!

== Home media ==
The Complete Series of A.J. Wentworth, B.A. was released on DVD on 9 July 2012.
