= H. F. Ellis =

Humphry Francis Ellis (17 July 1907 – 8 December 2000) was an English comic writer. He created A. J. Wentworth, the ineffectual schoolmaster whose fictional diaries were first published in the magazine Punch.

== Life ==
Humphry Francis Ellis was born in Metheringham, Lincolnshire. After gaining a double first in Classics at Magdalen College, Oxford, in 1930, Ellis was employed by Marlborough College to teach. Punch first accepted a submission in 1931, and he left to become a staff writer on the magazine in 1933, the same year he married Barbara Hasseldine.

Ellis became literary and deputy editor of the magazine in 1949, a post which he held until 1953, when he resigned in protest at the appointment of Malcolm Muggeridge as editor. Punch continued to publish Ellis's work, but from 1954 he found a more lucrative market in The New Yorker, where the Wentworth stories proved very popular.

Ellis was a rugby football blue at university, and subsequently played for the town of Richmond and for Kent.

The Papers of A. J. Wentworth, B.A. were republished by Prion Press before Ellis's death in Taunton in 2000.

== A. J. Wentworth, B.A. ==
In Punch, from November 1938 onwards, Ellis developed the character of A. J. Wentworth, which was inspired by his experience as a schoolmaster. A collected version, The Papers of A. J. Wentworth, B.A., was first published in book form in 1949. Four further Wentworth titles appeared up to 1982.

A. J. Wentworth, B.A., a gauche, diffident and rather ineffectual mathematics teacher, works at Burgrove Preparatory School in the fictional village of Wilminster. His diaries recount the trials of teaching Pythagoras to unruly schoolboys, as well as Wentworth's experiences as an officer in the Second World War, and later his life in retirement.

The Wentworth stories were read out on the BBC Radio 4 programme Woman's Hour by the actor Arthur Lowe, who went on to play Wentworth in an ITV sitcom, A.J. Wentworth, B.A. in 1982. Only six episodes were made before Lowe died.

== Bibliography ==
=== Books ===
- So This is Science!, 1932
- The Pleasure's Yours, 1933
- Much Ado, 1934
- Why the Whistle Went: Notes on the Laws of Rugby Football, c. 1948
- The Papers of A. J. Wentworth, B.A., 1949
- (Joint ed.) The Royal Artillery Commemoration Book, 1939–1945
- The Vexations of A. J. Wentworth, B.A., 1950
- (ed.) The Manual of Rugby Union Football, for Coaches and Players, 1952
- (ed.) The Art of Refereeing: a Handbook for Rugby Union Referees, 1956
- Twenty-Five Years Hard, 1960
- Mediatrics; or, The importance and proper care of the middle-aged, 1961
- The Papers of A. J. Wentworth, B.A. (Ret'd.), 1962, reprinted 2000
- Swan song of A. J. Wentworth, 1982
- The Bee in the Kitchen, 1983

=== Essays ===
- Ellis, H. F. (11 February 1985). "Do Not Go Gentle". The New Yorker. Vol. 60, no. 52. pp. 32–33.
