= Leonard Swindley =

Fictional character from British soap Coronation Street

- Coronation Street character
- Portrayed by: Arthur Lowe
- Duration: 1960–1965
- First appearance: Episode 3; 16 December 1960
- Last appearance: Episode 466; 31 May 1965
- Created by: Tony Warren
- Introduced by: Tony Warren
- Book appearances: Coronation Street: The Complete Saga
- Spin-off appearances: Pardon The Expression (1965–1966); Turn Out the Lights (1967)
In-universe information
- Occupation: Shop Manager
- Father: Thomas Swindley
- Mother: Eliza-Jane Swindley
- Sisters: Hilda Barrett
- Grandfathers: William Swindley
- Uncles: Ralph
- Aunts: Veronica

Leonard Swindley is a fictional character from the British ITV soap opera Coronation Street. One of the original characters created by Tony Warren, he was played by actor Arthur Lowe between 1960 and 1965. The character of Mr. Swindley also appeared as the central figure in two spin-off series following his departure from the Street—Pardon the Expression and Turn Out the Lights—making him a unique character in British soap opera.

== Creation ==
=== Casting ===
At the time filming commenced of the pilot episode of Coronation Street, the character of Leonard Swindley had not even been cast. Because he was not supposed to appear until episode three, auditions were still taking place until Arthur Lowe walked in and read for the producers. Lowe, later Captain Mainwaring in Dad's Army, was an established actor by the time of his Coronation Street casting, but it was his turn as pompous Mr. Swindley that made him a household name in the early 1960s.

In December 1961, only a year after the launch of the show, a strike of the actors' union Equity meant that Lowe, who was not under contract with the show at that point, was forced to leave the series along with several other stars of the Street. The strike lasted until April 1962, and Lowe agreed to reprise his role, returning in June along with Eileen Derbyshire.

Upon hearing of Lowe's decision to quit the series in 1965, ITV bosses offered him the chance to continue in the role as the star of a new sitcom based on his character. The result, Pardon The Expression, debuted two days after his final appearance in Coronation Street and ran for two series until 1966. It in turn produced its own spin-off Turn Out The Lights, again based on Swindley, which lasted only six episodes.

=== Background ===
Leonard Swindley, known simply as 'Mr Swindley' to most people, was a lay preacher for the Glad Tidings Mission Hall, a local missionary church on Coronation Street, and chairman of the committee. Swindley came from a family of drapers, and had inherited his shop 'Swindley's Emporium' from his father. The clothes store, situated on Victoria Street (now home to Roy's Rolls), originally employed Emily Nugent.

== Storylines ==
Swindley, in his role as a lay preacher, was a central figure in the local community. The Mission Hall would regularly play host charity ventures and plays among other uses. Swindley and his assistant Emily Nugent (Eileen Derbyshire) also organised several trips out for the locals.

In 1962, Swindley's clothes store was failing and piling debts forced him to sell up. The buyer, Niklos Papagopoulos, was the owner of a successful chain of clothes shops in Manchester called 'Gamma Garments'. Papagopoulos re-opened the store as Gamma weeks later, deciding to keep Swindley on as manager and Emily and Doreen Lostock (Angela Crow) as his assistants.

After working closely for over three years, Swindley's relationship with his colleague Emily grew and in 1964 she proposed. Swindley hesitated before accepting and a date was set for only a few weeks later. When the wedding day came however, Emily realised that neither of them truly loved each other and decided to call off the marriage. He assured her that he felt the same way and the pair managed to salvage their friendship to continue working together.

The next year, following Arthur Lowe's decision to quit, Swindley was offered a promotion at Gamma Garments and duly accepted, leaving the Mission, and Weatherfield behind. The character later moved on to work as manager for Dobson and Hawkes, the clothes store seen in the spin-off Pardon The Expression. In 1980, he sends a telegram to Emily congratulating her on her second wedding to Arnold Swain (George Waring).
