= Pardon the Expression =

British TV sitcom (1965–1966)

- Starring: Arthur Lowe; Paul Dawkins; Robert Dorning; Betty Driver; Joy Stewart
- No. of series: 2
- No. of episodes: 36

Production
- Producers: Harry Driver (series 1); Derek Granger (series 2)
- Production company: Granada Television

Original release
- Network: ITV
- Release: 2 June 1965 – 27 June 1966

Related
- Coronation Street; Turn Out the Lights

Pardon the Expression is a British sitcom made by Granada Television, that was first broadcast from Wednesday 2 June 1965 to Monday 27 June 1966. The sitcom was one of four spin-offs from the soap opera Coronation Street. Pardon the Expression itself had a spin-off: Turn Out the Lights, broadcast in 1967. There was not another spin-off until the 1980s with The Brothers McGregor, which reused two characters (played by different actors) who appeared in a single episode.

Leonard Swindley, played by Arthur Lowe was the central character. Formerly the manager of the fashion retail store Gamma Garments in Coronation Street, in this series he is the deputy manager of the department store Dobson and Hawks. His boss in the series was Ernest Parbold, played by Paul Dawkins, who was replaced by Wally Hunt, played by Robert Dorning, in series 2. Other regulars were Betty Driver as canteen lady Mrs Edgeley and Joy Stewart as Miss Sinclair, the boss's secretary. Another member of the cast was John Le Mesurier, who later reunited with Arthur Lowe in the classic comedy Dad's Army.

== Cast ==
- Arthur Lowe as Leonard Swindley (37 episodes)
- Betty Driver as Mrs Edgeley (31 episodes)
- Joy Stewart as Miss Sinclair (18 episodes)
- Mervyn Johns as Jacob Elijah "Jeb" Burgess (2 episodes)
- Paul Dawkins as Ernest Parbold (12 episodes; series 1)
- Barbara Young as Pam Plummer (3 episodes; series 1)
- Holly Doone as Mavis Foster (3 episodes; series 1)
- Judith Furse as Miss Buxton (2 episodes; series 1)
- Marji Campi as Gladys Cheeseborough (2 episodes; series 1)
- Judith Barker as Shirley Dixon (2 episodes; series 1)
- Robert Dorning as Wally Hunt (25 episodes; series 2)
- Anthony Sharp as Brigadier Hawk (6 episodes; series 2)
- John Le Mesurier as Sir Charles Dobson (4 episodes; series 2)
- Julian Holloway as Norman Burton (3 episodes; series 2)
- John Barron as Lord Penge (2 episodes; series 2)

== Episodes ==
=== Series 1 (1965) ===
- "The First Day" (2 June 1965)
- "The Headmistress" (9 June 1965)
- "The Trouble with Ada" (16 June 1965)
- "Mannequin Parade" (23 June 1965)
- "The Dance" (30 June 1965)
- "The Wedding" (7 July 1965)
- "The Pensioner" (14 July 1965)
- "The Visitor" (21 July 1965)
- "Birthday Present" (28 July 1965)
- "Little Boy Lost" (4 August 1965)
- "The Old One Two" (11 August 1965)
- "The Brain Drain" (18 August 1965)

=== Series 2 (1966) ===
- "The Economy Drive" (10 January 1966)
- "January Sale" (17 January 1966)
- "The Resignation" (24 January 1966)
- "Self Defence" (31 January 1966)
- "The Stocktaking" (7 February 1966)
- "The Home Help" (14 February 1966)
- "Big Hotel" (21 February 1966)
- "The Gaol Birds" (28 February 1966)
- "A Night to Remember" (7 March 1966)
- "Whose Baby are You?" (21 March 1966)
- "The Take-Over Bid" (28 March 1966)
- "Between the Covers" (4 April 1966)
- "Heads Down" (11 April 1966)
- "A Sheik in the Night" (18 April 1966)
- "Rustle of Spring" (25 April 1966)
- "The Ghost of Batsworth Castle" (2 May 1966)
- "The Sailor Home from the Sea" (9 May 1966)
- "The Dinner Party" (16 May 1966)
- "Man's Best Friend" (23 May 1966)
- "Thunderfinger – Part 1" (30 May 1966)
- "Thunderfinger – Part 2: Swindley Strikes Back" (6 June 1966)
- "The Switched-on Scene" (13 June 1966)
- "The Cup That Cheers" (20 June 1966)
- "On Health Farm Sommet Stirs" (27 June 1966)

== Home media ==
Both series of Pardon the Expression were released (separately) in mid-2009, a six-disc set of the complete series was released on 12 December 2011.

DVD	Release date
The Complete Series 1	7 May 2009
The Complete Series 2	3 August 2009
The Complete Series 1 to 2 Box Set	12 December 2011
