= Barnaby Rudge (TV series) =

- Genre: Historical drama
- Based on: Barnaby Rudge by Charles Dickens
- Written by: Michael Voysey
- Directed by: Morris Barry
- Starring: John Wood
- Country of origin: United Kingdom
- Original language: English
- No. of series: 1
- No. of episodes: 13

Production
- Producer: Douglas Allen
- Running time: 30 minutes
- Production company: BBC

Original release
- Release: 30 September – 23 December 1960

Barnaby Rudge is a British thirteen-part drama television series which originally aired on the BBC in thirteen episodes between 30 September and 23 December 1960. It was an adaptation of the 1841 novel Barnaby Rudge by Charles Dickens set against the backdrop of the 1780 Gordon Riots. The series survived the BBC's purge of the archives and was released on DVD in the USA around 2010, and later in the UK in 2017 by Simply Media. As well as being the only BBC adaptation, it remains the latest on-screen adaptation of the novel on film or television to date.

== Cast ==
- John Wood as Barnaby Rudge
- Barbara Hicks as Miss Miggs
- Newton Blick as Gabriel Varden
- Neil McCarthy as Hugh
- Eira Heath as Emma Haredale
- Jennifer Daniel as Dolly Varden
- Joan Hickson as Mrs Varden
- Timothy Bateson as Simon Tappertit
- Peter Williams as Mr Haredale
- Bernard Brown as Mr Edward Chester
- Isabel Dean as Mrs Rudge
- Raymond Huntley as Mr John Chester
- Alan Haywood as Joe Willet
- Arthur Brough as John Willet
- Richard Wordsworth as Mr Gashford
- Esmond Knight as Dennis
- Angela Crow as Betsy
- Nigel Arkwright as The Stranger
- Norman Pierce as John Grueby
- Anthony Sharp as Lord George Gordon
- John Atkinson as Phil Parkes
- John Gill as Solomon Daisy
- Tony Sympson as Tom Cobb
- Michael Hitchman as Stagg
- Patrick Boxill as Peak
- William Forbes as Turnkey
- Frank Atkinson as Stagg
- Jeffrey Segal as Mr Akerman
- Arnold Yarrow as Tailor
- Malcolm Knight as Benjamin
- Edward Brooks as Leader of Procession
- John Citroen as 1st Man
- Ian Keill as Mark Gilbert
- Leslie Bates as 2nd Man
- Clive Marshall as Jonathan
- Peter Blythe as George
- Bernard Spear as 'The Lion' landlord
- Ivor Salter as Recruiting Sergeant
- Harry Littlewood as Timid man
- Harold Reese as Tom
- Horace Sequeira as Old Man
- Michael Bird as Squire
- Wilfrid Grantham as General Conway
- Bill Clothier as Landlord of 'The Boot'
- John Moore as Sir George Saville
- Larry Burns as Townsman
- John Forbes-Robertson as Ensign
- Brian Hayes as Mr Burke
- Brian Badcoe as Colonel
- Hilary Sesta as Maid
- George Woodbridge as Mr Dugdale
- John Boddington as Member of Parliament
- Reginald Green as Houseowner
- Arthur Lawrence as Clergyman
- Nicholas Tannar as Houseowner
- Allan McClelland as King George III
- William Sherwood as Lord Mayor of London
- Neil Wilson as Sergeant
- Barry Steele as Corporal
- Anthony Woodruff as Lord-in-Waiting
- Kenneth Nash as Miggs' Nephew
- John Barrett as Toll-keeper (uncredited)

== Archive status ==
All episodes were originally recorded on 405 line videotapes, which were later wiped or destroyed. However, telerecordings of all 13 episodes survived. Simply Media did not have the budget required to perform a full restoration of the copies, so the lining errors found on early videotape copies without VidFIRE restoration are prevalent, although only minor scratches and dirt are seen throughout the DVD release. The only notable exceptions are a fault in one of the earlier episodes where a line of dialogue and some brief footage are missing (most likely due to irreversible damage to the film), and the final episode, which has significantly poorer sound and picture quality than the other episodes.

== Critical reception ==
Reviewing its DVD release, Archive Television Musings wrote "Although a handful of performances are less than effective and the story feels somewhat disjointed (it’s essentially two separate tales bolted together) Barnaby Rudge is still a serial of considerable interest. The theme of the later episodes feels eerily topical, offering a sharp change of pace from the countryside intrigues of the first half. It’s another well-crafted Classic Serial which, despite its length, never outstays its welcome."
