= The Brothers McGregor =

- Genre: Sitcom
- Starring: Paul Barber; Philip Whitchurch
- Country of origin: United Kingdom
- Original language: English
- No. of series: 4
- No. of episodes: 26

Production
- Running time: 30 minutes
- Production company: Granada Television

Original release
- Network: ITV
- Release: 4 September 1985 – 24 August 1988

The Brothers McGregor is a British sitcom television series set in Liverpool, and a spin-off of ITV soap opera Coronation Street, featuring two characters that originally appeared in the soap for one episode in May 1982. The show ran for four series between 1985 and 1988. It was produced by Granada TV, with the episodes written by Julian Roach and John Stevenson, who were also writing episodes of Coronation Street at the time. Unable to get Carl Chase and Tony Osoba back to play the roles, Philip Whitchurch and Paul Barber were cast instead.

== Cast ==
- Philip Whitchurch as Cyril McGregor
- Paul Barber as Wesley McGregor
- Jean Heywood as Dolly McGregor
- Jackie Downey as Glenys Pike
- Allan Surtees as Colwyn Stanley
- Terry Cundall as Nigel

== Other sources ==
- https://www.youtube.com/watch?v=gpvkWyKeUm8 YouTube - The Brothers MacGregor
