= Coronation Street =

British television soap opera (1960–present)

- Genre: Soap opera
- Created by: Tony Warren
- Starring: Present cast; Former cast
- Theme music composer: Eric Spear
- Opening theme: "Lancashire Blues"
- Country of origin: United Kingdom
- Original language: English
- No. of episodes: 11,984.

Production
- Producers: Various; Kate Brooks
- Production locations: Granada Studios, Manchester (1960–2014); MediaCityUK, Trafford (2014–present)
- Camera setup: Multiple-camera
- Running time: 30 minutes (1960–2022, 2026–present), 60 minutes (2022–2026)
- Production companies: Granada Television (1960–2006); ITV Productions (2006–2009); ITV Studios Continuing Drama (2009–present)

Original release
- Network: ITV
- Release: 9 December 1960 – present

Related
- Pardon the Expression; Turn Out the Lights; The Brothers McGregor; Albion Market; The Road to Coronation Street

Coronation Street (colloquially referred to as Corrie) is a British television soap opera created by Granada Television and shown on ITV since 9 December 1960. The programme centres on a cobbled, terraced street in the fictional town of Weatherfield in Greater Manchester. The location was itself based on Salford, the hometown of the show's first screenwriter and creator, Tony Warren.

Originally broadcast twice weekly, Coronation Street increased its runtime in later years, airing in five 30 minute slots per week since January 2026. Warren developed the concept for the series, which was initially rejected by Granada's founder Sidney Bernstein. Producer Harry Elton convinced Bernstein to commission 13 pilot episodes. The show has since become a significant part of British culture and underpinned the success of its producing Granada franchise.

Currently produced by ITV Studios, the successor to Granada, the series is filmed at MediaCityUK and broadcast across all ITV regions and internationally. In 2010, Coronation Street was recognised by Guinness World Records as the world's longest-running television soap opera upon its 50th anniversary.

Coronation Street was originally influenced by kitchen-sink realism and is known for portraying a working-class community with a blend of humour and strong, relatable characters. As of 2025, it averages approximately four million viewers per episode. The series aired its 10,000th episode on 7 February 2020 and marked its 60th anniversary later that year.

== History ==
=== 1960s ===
The first episode of Coronation Street aired on 9 December 1960 at 7 pm. It initially received mixed reviews; Daily Mirror columnist Ken Irwin predicted the series would last only three weeks. The Daily Mirror also printed: "The programme is doomed from the outset... For there is little reality in this new serial, which apparently, we have to suffer twice a week." Granada Television had commissioned 13 episodes, with some inside the company doubting the show would last beyond its planned production run. However, viewers quickly connected with the programme's portrayal of relatable, everyday characters. The programme also made use of Northern English language and dialect; affectionate local terms such as "eh, chuck?", "nowt" (/naʊt/, from nought, meaning nothing), and "by 'eck!" became widely heard on British television for the first time.

Early storylines included student Ken Barlow (William Roache), whose university education set him apart from his working-class family, including his brother David (Alan Rothwell) and parents Frank (Frank Pemberton) and Ida (Noel Dyson). Barlow's character offered commentary on broader social changes, including globalisation, as exemplified by his 1961 line: "You can't go on just thinking about your own street these days. We're living with people on the other side of the world." Roache remains the only original cast member and holds the record as the longest-serving actor in Coronation Street and global soap opera history.

In March 1961, the show reached number one in the television ratings and remained there for the rest of the year. Earlier that year, a television audience measurement (TAM) showed that 75% of available viewers (approximately 15 million people) watched the programme. By 1964, Coronation Street attracted more than 20 million regular viewers, with ratings peaking on 2 December 1964, at 21.36 million viewers.

In 1964, Tim Aspinall became the series producer and implemented significant changes to the programme. Nine cast members were fired, the first being Lynne Carol, who had played Martha Longhurst since early in Coronation Street's run. Carol's firing caused controversy, prompting her co-star Violet Carson (Ena Sharples) to threaten to quit, although she ultimately remained. The sacking was widely covered in the media, and Carol was mobbed by fans while out in public. Some, including Coronation Street writer H.V. Kershaw, criticised the decision as a bid to boost ratings. Steve Tanner and Elsie Howard's 1967 wedding had more than 20 million viewers.

By 1968, critics contended that the programme offered a nostalgic and outdated depiction of the urban working class, failing to reflect the contemporary realities of British society amid the huge economic and social changes that occurred during the 1960s. Granada considered modernising the show with issue-driven plots, including Lucille Hewitt (Jennifer Moss) becoming addicted to drugs, Jerry Booth (Graham Haberfield) being in a storyline about homosexuality, Emily Nugent (Eileen Derbyshire) having an out-of-wedlock child, and introducing a black family. However, these ideas were abandoned owing to concerns about viewer reactions.

The first episode filmed in colour was broadcast on 3 November 1969. Since then, all episodes have been produced in colour, with the exception of those created during the Colour Strike.

=== 1970s ===
Several main cast members departed Coronation Street in the early 1970s. In 1970, Arthur Leslie, who played Jack Walker, the landlord of the Rovers Return Inn, died suddenly, and his character was written out shortly thereafter. Anne Reid left the series in 1971, with her character, Valerie Barlow, dying owing to accidental electrocution from a faulty hairdryer. In 1973, Pat Phoenix, who played Elsie Tanner, departed, and Doris Speed (Annie Walker) took a two-month leave of absence. During this period, ITV's other flagship soap opera, Crossroads, experienced an increase in viewership, while Coronation Street saw a decline in ratings.

The departure of these cast members in the early 1970s prompted the writing team to expand the roles of supporting characters and introduce new ones. Deirdre Hunt (Anne Kirkbride) was introduced in 1972 and became a regular character in 1973. Bet Lynch (Julie Goodyear), who had become a regular character in 1970, became increasingly prominent as the decade progressed. Rita Littlewood (Barbara Knox), who had made a single appearance in 1964, returned and joined the regular cast in 1972. Mavis Riley (Thelma Barlow) became a regular character in 1973. Ivy Tyldesley (Lynne Perrie, later renamed "Tilsley") was introduced as a recurring character in 1971. Longtime characters Gail Potter (Helen Worth), Blanche Hunt (initially played by Patricia Cutts and later by Maggie Jones), and Vera Duckworth (Liz Dawn) were introduced in 1974.

Comic storylines, a hallmark of the series in the 1960s, had become less frequent in the early 1970s. They were revived under new producer Bill Podmore, who joined the programme in 1976 after previously working on Granada's comedy productions.

In September 1977, the News of the World quoted actor Stephen Hancock (Ernest Bishop) as saying "The Street kills an actor. I'm just doing a job, not acting. The scriptwriters have turned me into Ernie Bishop. I've tried to resist it but it is very hard not to play the part all the time, even at home." Hancock also expressed frustration with the payment system, which guaranteed some long-serving actors — including Pat Phoenix, Doris Speed, and Peter Adamson — payment for every episode regardless of their appearances, while others were compensated only for episodes in which they appeared. Hancock's complaints led to a dispute with Podmore, dubbed "The Godfather" by the media, who refused to alter the system. Hancock ultimately resigned.

To write out Ernest Bishop while preserving the role of his wife, Emily (Eileen Derbyshire), the writers decided his character would be fatally shot during a payroll robbery at Mike Baldwin's (Johnny Briggs) factory. The episode, which aired on 11 January 1978, marked the first instance of such explicit violence on Coronation Street, leading to a significant viewer backlash. Granada's switchboard was overwhelmed with complaints, and the Lobby Against TV Violence criticised the decision to air the storyline. Granada defended the plot, emphasising its focus on the grief and loss experienced by Emily.

Despite its enduring popularity, critics argued that Coronation Street had grown complacent during this period, with the show relying on nostalgic depictions of working-class life rather than addressing contemporary social issues.

=== 1980s ===
Between 1980 and 1984, Coronation Street faced the loss of many original cast members. Violet Carson (Ena Sharples) retired in 1980 and Doris Speed (Annie Walker) retired in 1983, Pat Phoenix (Elsie Tanner) left the programme permanently in 1984. Jack Howarth died in 1984 and his character, Albert Tatlock, was written out off-screen. By May 1984, William Roache (Ken Barlow) was the sole remaining actor from the programme's original cast.

Characters such as Phyllis Pearce (Jill Summers), Vera and Jack Duckworth (Liz Dawn and Bill Tarmey), and Percy Sugden (Bill Waddington) took on roles reminiscent of earlier characters.

Established characters were assigned new roles, and new characters were introduced to fill the gaps left by those who departed. Phyllis Pearce (Jill Summers) was hailed as the new Ena Sharples in 1982, the Duckworths moved into No.9 in 1983 and slipped into the role once held by the Ogdens, while Percy Sugden (Bill Waddington) appeared in 1983 and took over the grumpy war veteran role from Albert Tatlock. The question of who would take over the Rovers Return after Annie Walker's 1983 exit was answered in 1985 when Bet Lynch (who also mirrored the vulnerability and strength of Elsie Tanner) was installed as landlady. In 1983, Shirley Armitage (Lisa Lewis) became the first major Black character in the programme.

In 1983, Peter Adamson, who had played Len Fairclough since 1961, was dismissed for breaching his contract. Granada had previously warned Adamson for publishing unauthorised newspaper articles that criticised the show and its cast. Producer Bill Podmore terminated Adamson's contract after discovering he had sold his memoirs despite the prior warning. The sacking coincided with allegations of Adamson having indecently assaulted two eight-year-old girls in a swimming pool. Granada Television gave Adamson financial support through his trial, with a Crown Court jury finding him not guilty in July 1983. Adamson's dispute over his memoirs and newspaper articles was not known to the public and the media reported that Adamson had been dismissed because of the allegations. Len Fairclough was killed off-screen in a motorway crash while returning home from an affair in December 1983. Adamson celebrated the character's death by delivering an obituary on TV-am dressed as an undertaker.

New soap operas began airing on British television in the 1980s, with Channel 4 launching Brookside in 1982 and the BBC debuting EastEnders in 1985. Both soaps presented a grittier, more contemporary view of British life, contrasting with Coronation Street's nostalgic tone. EastEnders regularly obtained higher viewing figures than Coronation Street owing to its omnibus episodes shown at weekends. Despite this, Coronation Street maintained strong ratings.

Between 1988 and 1989, many aspects of the show were modernised by new producer David Liddiment. A new exterior set had been built in 1982, and in 1989 it was redeveloped to include new houses and shops. Production techniques were also changed, with a new studio being built, and the inclusion of more location filming, which had moved exterior scenes from being shot on film to videotape in 1988. Owing to new pressures, a third weekly episode would be broadcast each Friday at 7:30 pm, with the first Friday episode broadcast on 20 October 1989.

In 1988, Christopher Quinten, who had played Brian Tilsley since 1978, informed Granada of his intention to move to the United States to marry Leeza Gibbons and pursue an acting career in Los Angeles. Quinten sought assurances that his role would remain open for a potential return. However, producers decided that Tilsley would be killed off. Quinten was in Los Angeles when the decision was made and threatened to quit abruptly. Co-star Helen Worth convinced him to film his final scenes. Brian Tilsley's death, aired on 15 February 1989, depicted him being fatally stabbed while defending a young woman outside a nightclub. The storyline attracted viewer complaints, with Mary Whitehouse condemning the portrayal of violence.

One of Coronation Street's most prominent storylines in the 1980s was the engagement and marriage of Ken Barlow and Deirdre Langton (Anne Kirkbride). In July 1981, their wedding was watched by more than 15 million viewers. Deirdre Barlow's affair with Mike Baldwin (Johnny Briggs) in 1983, garnered significant media attention, and began an ongoing feud that followed between Ken Barlow and Mike Baldwin.

Other notable marriages included Alf Roberts (Bryan Mosley) to Audrey Potter (Sue Nicholls) in 1985, Mike Baldwin to Ken Barlow's daughter Susan (Wendy Jane Walker) in 1986, Kevin Webster (Michael Le Vell) to Sally Seddon (Sally Whittaker) in 1986, Bet Lynch to Alec Gilroy (Roy Barraclough) in 1987, and Ivy Tilsley to Don Brennan (Geoffrey Hinsliff) in 1988. The long-awaited marriage of Mavis Riley and Derek Wilton (Peter Baldwin) occurred in 1988 after more than a decade of on-and-off romance and a failed marriage attempt in 1984.

Jean Alexander, who played Hilda Ogden on the programme starting in 1964, left Coronation Street in 1987. Her final episode aired on Christmas Day 1987, with a combined audience (original and omnibus) of 26.7 million. Between 1986 and 1989, the storyline of Rita Fairclough's (Barbara Knox) domestic abuse at the hands of her partner Alan Bradley (Mark Eden), followed by his death after being struck by a Blackpool tram in December 1989, unfolded. This plotline brought the show its highest-ever combined viewing figure, with 26.93 million viewers watching a March 1989 episode where Bradley is on the run from the police after attempting to kill Rita. This record is sometimes mistakenly attributed to the tram death episode aired on 8 December 1989.

=== 1990s ===
In 1992, William Rees-Mogg, Chairman of the Broadcasting Standards Council, criticised Coronation Street for its low representation of ethnic minorities and its nostalgic portrayal of a bygone era. This was seen as unreflective of Greater Manchester, where many neighbourhoods had significant Black and Asian populations. Headlines such as "Coronation Street shuts out blacks" (The Times) and "'Put colour in t'Street" (Daily Mirror) reflected the controversy. Patrick Stoddart of The Times defended the show, stating: "the millions who watch Coronation Street – and who will continue to do so despite Lord Rees-Mogg – know real life when they see it ... in the most confident and accomplished soap opera television has ever seen" While Black and Asian characters had appeared sporadically, the first regular non-white family, the Desai family, was introduced in 1999.

In 1990, new characters Des Barnes (Philip Middlemiss) and Steph Barnes (Amelia Bullmore) moved to Coronation Street and were labelled yuppies by the media. Raquel Wolstenhulme (Sarah Lancashire) debuted in 1991 and became one of the era's most popular characters, departing in 1996 with a brief return in 2000. The McDonald family – Liz (Beverley Callard), Jim (Charles Lawson), Steve (Simon Gregson), and Andy (Nicholas Cochrane) – were introduced in 1989 and became major characters in the 1990s. Other notable arrivals included Maud Grimes (Elizabeth Bradley), a wheelchair user and pensioner, in 1993; Roy Cropper (David Neilson), a café owner, in 1995; young married couple Gary and Judy Mallett (Ian Mercer and Gaynor Faye) in 1995; and butcher Fred Elliott (John Savident) in 1994 and his son Ashley Peacock (Steven Arnold) in 1995. The 1990s also saw an increase in slapstick and physical humour, exemplified by comedic characters including supermarket manager Reg Holdsworth (Ken Morley).

In 1997, Brian Park became producer with a vision to modernise the show and focus on younger characters. On his first day, he axed several long-standing characters, including Derek Wilton (Peter Baldwin), Don Brennan (Geoffrey Hinsliff), Percy Sugden (Bill Waddington), Bill Webster (Peter Armitage), Billy Williams (Frank Mills) and Maureen Holdsworth (Sherrie Hewson). The decision prompted Thelma Barlow, who played Mavis Wilton, to resign in protest at Baldwin's dismissal. Several longtime writers, including Barry Hill, Adele Rose, and Julian Roach, resigned during this period.

Park introduced younger characters between 1997 and 1998, such as a recast Nick Tilsley (Adam Rickitt), single mother Zoe Tattersall (Joanne Froggatt), and the problematic Battersby family. The show also began addressing more contemporary issues, including drug dealing, eco-activism, and religious cults. Hayley Patterson (Julie Hesmondhalgh), introduced during this era, became the first transgender character in a British soap opera and soon married Roy Cropper. Park, who resigned in 1998, cited this storyline as one of his most significant achievements.

The changes divided audiences, with some alienated by the modernised approach. Critics accused Coronation Street of losing its traditional charm while trying to emulate edgier rivals such as Brookside and EastEnders. Victor Lewis-Smith wrote in the Daily Mirror: "Apparently it doesn't matter that this is a first-class soap opera, superbly scripted and flawlessly performed by a seasoned repertory company."

One of the decade's most famous storylines occurred in 1998, when Deirdre Rachid (Anne Kirkbride) was wrongfully imprisoned after being deceived by conman Jon Lindsay (Owen Aaronovitch). The episode depicting her sentencing attracted 19 million viewers and inspired the "Free the Weatherfield One" campaign, which generated significant media attention. Prime Minister Tony Blair commented on the fictional case in Parliament. Deirdre was released after three weeks, with Granada confirming that her release had always been planned despite the media frenzy.

=== 2000s ===
On 8 December 2000, Coronation Street celebrated its 40th anniversary with a live, hour-long episode. Prince Charles appeared as himself. Earlier that year, 13-year-old Sarah-Louise Platt (Tina O'Brien) became pregnant, giving birth to a daughter, Bethany, on 4 June. The February episode where Gail was told of her daughter's pregnancy was watched by 15 million viewers. The programme continued to tackle issue-led storylines, including the rape of Toyah Battersby (Georgia Taylor), Roy and Hayley Cropper (David Neilson and Julie Hesmondhalgh) abducting their foster child, Sarah Platt's internet chat room abduction, and Alma Halliwell's (Amanda Barrie) 2001 death from cervical cancer. These storylines proved unpopular with viewers and led to a decline in ratings. As a result, in October 2001, producer Jane Macnaught was reassigned, and Carolyn Reynolds took over. In 2002, Kieran Roberts became producer, aiming to reintroduce "gentle storylines and humour," steering the show away from competing with other soaps.

In July 2002, Gail Platt married Richard Hillman (Brian Capron), a financial advisor who had left Duggie Ferguson (John Bowe) to die after a fall during an argument, murdered his ex-wife Patricia (Annabelle Apsion), and later killed their neighbour Maxine Peacock (Tracy Shaw). He also attempted to kill his mother-in-law, Audrey Roberts (Sue Nicholls), and longtime family friend, Emily Bishop (Eileen Derbyshire), all for financial gain as his debts mounted. Hillman confessed his crimes to Gail in a two-hander episode in February 2003 before returning weeks later with the intention of killing Gail, her children Sarah and David (Jack P. Shepherd), and granddaughter Bethany by driving them into a canal. While the Platt family survived, Hillman drowned. This storyline received widespread media attention, with viewing figures peaking at 19.4 million.

Todd Grimshaw (Bruno Langley) became Corrie's first regular homosexual character. In 2003, another gay male character was introduced, Sean Tully (Antony Cotton). The bigamy of Peter Barlow (Chris Gascoyne) and his addiction to alcohol, later in the decade, Maya Sharma's (Sasha Behar) revenge on former lover Dev Alahan (Jimmi Harkishin), Charlie Stubbs's (Bill Ward) psychological abuse of Shelley Unwin (Sally Lindsay), and the deaths of Mike Baldwin (Johnny Briggs), Vera Duckworth (Liz Dawn) and Fred Elliott (John Savident). In 2007, Tracy Barlow (Kate Ford) murdered Charlie Stubbs and claimed it was self-defence; the audience during this storyline peaked at 13.3 million. At the 2007 British Soap Awards, it won Best Storyline, and Ford was voted Best Actress for her portrayal.

In July 2007, after 34 years in the role of Vera Duckworth, Liz Dawn left the show owing to ill health. After conversation between Dawn and producers Kieran Roberts and Steve Frost, the decision was made to kill Vera off.

Tina O'Brien revealed in the British press on 4 April 2007 that she would be leaving Coronation Street later in the year. Sarah-Louise, who was involved in some of the decade's most controversial stories, left in December 2007 with her daughter, Bethany. In 2008, Michelle learning that Ryan (Ben Thompson) was not her biological son, having been accidentally swapped at birth with Alex Neeson (Dario Coates). Carla Connor (Alison King) turned to Liam for comfort and developed feelings for him. In spite of knowing about her feelings, Liam married Maria Sutherland (Samia Longchambon). Maria and Liam's baby son was stillborn in April, and during an estrangement from Maria upon the death of their baby, Liam had a one-night stand with Carla, a story that helped pave the way for his departure.

In August 2008, Jed Stone (Kenneth Cope) returned after 42 years. Liam Connor and his ex-sister-in-law Carla gave into their feelings for each other and began an affair. Carla's fiancé Tony Gordon (Gray O'Brien) discovered the affair and had Liam killed in a hit-and-run in October. Carla struggled to come to terms with Liam's death, but decided she still loved Tony and married him on 3 December, in an episode attracting 10.3 million viewers. In April 2009 it was revealed that Eileen Grimshaw's (Sue Cleaver) father, Colin (Edward de Souza) – the son of Elsie Tanner's (Pat Phoenix) cousin Arnley – had slept with Eileen's old classmate, Paula Carp (Sharon Duce) while she was still at school, and that Paula's daughter Julie (Katy Cavanagh) was in fact also Colin's daughter. Other stories in 2009 included Maria giving birth to Liam's son and her subsequent relationship with Liam's killer Tony, Steve McDonald's (Simon Gregson) marriage to Becky Granger (Katherine Kelly) and Kevin Webster's (Michael Le Vell) affair with Molly Dobbs (Vicky Binns). On Christmas Day 2009, Sally Webster (Sally Dynevor) told husband Kevin that she had breast cancer, just as he was about to leave her for lover Molly.

=== 2010s ===
The show began broadcasting in high-definition in May 2010, and on 17 September that year, Coronation Street entered Guinness World Records as the world's longest-running television soap opera after the American soap opera As the World Turns concluded. William Roache was listed as the world's longest-running soap actor. Coronation Street's 50th anniversary week was celebrated with seven episodes, plus a special one-hour live episode, broadcast from 6–10 December. The episodes averaged 14 million viewers, a 52.1% share of the audience. The anniversary was also publicised with ITV specials and news broadcasts. In the storyline, Nick Tilsley and Leanne Battersby's bar — The Joinery — exploded during Peter Barlow's stag party. As a result, the viaduct was destroyed, sending a Metrolink tram careering onto the street, destroying D&S Alahan's Corner Shop and The Kabin. Two characters, Ashley Peacock (Steven Arnold) and Molly Dobbs (Vicky Binns), along with an unknown taxi driver, were killed as a result of the disaster. Rita Sullivan (Barbara Knox) survived, despite being trapped under the rubble of her destroyed shop. Fiz Stape (Jennie McAlpine) prematurely gave birth to a baby girl, Hope. The episode of EastEnders broadcast on the same day as Coronation Street's 50th anniversary episode included a tribute, with the character Dot Branning (June Brown, who briefly appeared in the show during the 1970s) saying that she never misses an episode of Coronation Street.

=== 2020s ===
On 7 February 2020, with its 60th anniversary later in the year, Coronation Street aired its landmark 10,000th episode, the runtime of which was extended to 60 minutes. Producers stated that the episode would contain "a nostalgic trip down memory lane" and "a nod to its own past". A month later, ITV announced that production on the soap would be suspended, as the United Kingdom was put into a national lockdown owing to the COVID-19 pandemic (see impact of the COVID-19 pandemic on television).

After an 11-week intermission for all cast and crew members, filming resumed in June 2020. The episodes featured social distancing to adhere to the guidelines set by the British government, and it was confirmed that all actors over 70, as well as those with underlying health conditions, would not be allowed to be on set until it was safe to do so. This included Coronation Street veterans William Roache (Ken Barlow) at 88, Barbara Knox (Rita Tanner) at 87, Malcolm Hebden (Norris Cole) at 80 and Sue Nicholls (Audrey Roberts) at 76. It was deemed safe for 74-year-old Maureen Lipman (Evelyn Plummer) and 71-year-old David Neilson (Roy Cropper) to continue. By December, all cast members had returned to set, and on Wednesday 9 December 2020, the soap celebrated its 60th anniversary, with original plans for the episode forced to change owing to COVID-19 guidelines. The anniversary week saw the conclusion of a long-running coercive control storyline that began in May 2019, with Geoff Metcalfe (Ian Bartholomew) abusing Yasmeen Nazir (Shelley King). The showdown, which resulted in the death of Geoff allowed social distancing rules to be relaxed on the condition that the crew members involved formed a social bubble prior to the filming. In late 2021, series producer Iain MacLeod announced that the original plans for the 60th anniversary would now take place in a special week of episodes in October 2021.

On 12 October 2021, it was announced that Coronation Street would partake in a special crossover event involving seven British soaps to promote the topic of climate change ahead of the 2021 United Nations Climate Change Conference. During the week, beginning from 1 November, social media clips featuring Liam Cavanagh (Jonny McPherson) and Amelia Spencer (Daisy Campbell) from Emmerdale, as well as Daniel Granger (Matthew Chambers) from Doctors were featured on the programme, while events from Holby City were also referenced. A similar clip featuring Maria Connor (Samia Longchambon) was also featured on EastEnders.

In June 2024, ITV announced that Coronation Street's third longest-serving cast member, Helen Worth, had decided to leave the soap after fifty years of portraying Gail Platt. The character made her departure in December 2024. Sue Cleaver, Charlotte Jordan, Sue Devaney and Colson Smith had their respective characters (Eileen Grimshaw, Daisy Midgeley, Debbie Webster and Craig Tinker) subsequently set to be written out over, with some cast members deciding to quit. In what the Metro described as a "cast exodus".

== Characters ==
Since 1960, Coronation Street has featured many characters whose popularity with viewers and critics has differed greatly. The original cast was created by Tony Warren, with the characters of Ena Sharples (Violet Carson), Elsie Tanner (Pat Phoenix) and Annie Walker (Doris Speed) as central figures. These three women remained with the show for at least 20 years, and became archetypes of British soap opera, often being emulated by other serials. Ena was the street's busybody, battle-axe and self-proclaimed moral voice. Elsie was the tart with a heart, who was constantly hurt by men in the search for true love. Annie Walker, landlady of the Rovers Return Inn, had delusions of grandeur and saw herself as better than the other residents.

Coronation Street became known for the portrayal of strong female characters, including original cast characters such as Ena, Annie and Elsie, and later Hilda Ogden (Jean Alexander), who first appeared in 1964; all four became household names during the 1960s. Warren's programme was largely matriarchal, which some commentators put down to the female-dominant environment in which he grew up. Consequently, the show has a long tradition of downtrodden husbands, most famously Stan Ogden (Bernard Youens) and Jack Duckworth (Bill Tarmey), husbands of Hilda and Vera Duckworth (Liz Dawn), respectively.

Coronation Street's longest-serving character, Ken Barlow (William Roache) entered the storyline as a young radical, reflecting the youth of 1960s Britain, where figures such as the Beatles, the Rolling Stones and the model Twiggy were to reshape the concept of youthful rebellion. Though the rest of the original Barlow family were killed off before the end of the 1970s, Ken, who for 27 years was the only character from the first episode remaining, has remained the constant link throughout the entire series. In 2011, Dennis Tanner (Philip Lowrie), another character from the first episode, returned to Coronation Street after a 43-year absence. Since 1984, Ken Barlow has been the show's only remaining original character. Emily Bishop (Eileen Derbyshire) had appeared in the series since January 1961, when the show was just weeks old, and was the show's longest-serving female character before she departed in January 2016 after 55 years. Rita Tanner (Barbara Knox) appeared on the show for one episode in December 1964, before returning as a full-time cast member in January 1972. She is currently the second longest-serving original cast member on the show. Roache and Knox are also the two oldest-working cast members on the soap.

Stan and Hilda Ogden were introduced in 1964, with Hilda becoming one of the most famous British soap opera characters of all time. In a 1982 poll, she was voted fourth-most recognisable woman in Britain, after Queen Elizabeth the Queen Mother, Queen Elizabeth II and Diana, Princess of Wales. Hilda's best-known attributes were her pinny, hair curlers, and the "muriel" in her living room with three "flying" duck ornaments. Hilda Ogden's departure on Christmas Day 1987 remains the highest-rated episode of Coronation Street ever, with nearly 27 million viewers. Stan Ogden had been killed off in 1984 following the death of actor Bernard Youens after a long illness that had restricted his appearances towards the end of his life.

Bet Lynch (Julie Goodyear) first appeared in 1966, before becoming a regular in 1970, and went on to become one of the most famous Corrie characters. Bet stood as the central character of the show from 1985 until departing in 1995, often being dubbed as "Queen of the Street" by the media, and indeed herself. The character briefly returned in June 2002 and November 2003.

Coronation Street and its characters often rely heavily on archetypes, with the characterisation of some of its current and recent cast based loosely on former characters. Phyllis Pearce (Jill Summers), Blanche Hunt (Maggie Jones) and Sylvia Goodwin (Stephanie Cole) embodied the role of the acid-tongued busybody originally held by Ena, Sally Webster (Sally Dynevor) has grown snobbish, such as Annie, and a number of the programme's female characters, such as Carla Connor (Alison King), mirror the vulnerability of Elsie and Bet. Other recurring archetypes include the war veteran such as Albert Tatlock (Jack Howarth), Percy Sugden (Bill Waddington) and Gary Windass (Mikey North), the bumbling retail manager such as Leonard Swindley (Arthur Lowe), Reg Holdsworth (Ken Morley) and Norris Cole (Malcolm Hebden), quick-tempered, tough tradesmen such as Len Fairclough (Peter Adamson), Jim McDonald (Charles Lawson), Tommy Harris (Thomas Craig) and Owen Armstrong (Ian Puleston-Davies), and the perennial losers such as Stan and Hilda, Jack and Vera, Les Battersby (Bruce Jones), Beth Tinker (Lisa George) and Kirk Sutherland (Andrew Whyment).

Villains are also common character types, such as Tracy Barlow (Kate Ford), Alan Bradley (Mark Eden), Jenny Bradley (Sally Ann Matthews), Rob Donovan (Marc Baylis), Frank Foster (Andrew Lancel), Tony Gordon (Gray O'Brien), Caz Hammond (Rhea Bailey), Richard Hillman (Brian Capron), Greg Kelly (Stephen Billington), Will Chatterton (Leon Ockenden), Nathan Curtis (Christopher Harper), Callum Logan (Sean Ward), Karl Munro (John Michie), Pat Phelan (Connor McIntyre), David Platt (Jack P. Shepherd), Maya Sharma (Sasha Behar), Kirsty Soames (Natalie Gumede), John Stape (Graeme Hawley), Geoff Metcalfe (Ian Bartholomew) and Gary Windass (Mikey North). The show's former archivist and scriptwriter Daran Little disagreed with the characterisation of the show as a collection of stereotypes. "Rather, remember that Elsie, Ena and others were the first of their kind ever seen on British television. If later characters are stereotypes, it's because they are from the same original mould. It is the hundreds of programmes that have followed which have copied Coronation Street."

In 2024, it was reported that the number of actors appearing in each storyline had been cut in order to reduce costs owing to declining viewing figures.

== Storylines ==
Many topical issues have been tackled on Coronation Street, such as rape, including male and marital, transgender rights, teenage pregnancy, racism, coercive control, cancer, homosexuality, domestic violence, child grooming, suicide, conversion therapy, revenge porn, acid attack, right to die, motor neurone disease, dementia and historic sexual abuse.

Key storylines have included: Mike Baldwin and Deirdre Barlow's affair (1983), the murder of Brian Tilsley (1989), Alan Bradley's terrorising Rita Fairclough (1989), Kevin Webster's affair with Natalie Horrocks (1997), Deirdre's wrongful imprisonment for fraud (1998), Sarah Platt's teenage pregnancy (2000), Toyah Battersby's rape (2001), Alma Halliwell's death from cervical cancer (2001), Richard Hillman's killing spree (2002–2003), Peter Barlow's bigamy (2003), Kevin's affair with Molly Dobbs (2009), Kirsty Soames's abuse of Tyrone Dobbs (2012), Hayley Cropper's death from pancreatic cancer (2014), Faye Windass's teenage pregnancy (2015), Bethany Platt's grooming and sexual exploitation (2017), David Platt's rape (2018), Aidan Connor's suicide (2018), Sinead Tinker's diagnosis and subsequent death from cervical cancer (2019), Yasmeen Nazir's coercive control at the hands of her husband Geoff Metcalfe (2020), Daisy Midgeley being the victim of a stalker (2023), Paul Foreman's diagnosis with motor neurone disease (2023), Liam Connor's school bullying and subsequent suicidal thoughts (2023), Mason Radcliffe's death from knife crime (2025) and Debbie Webster's early-onset dementia (2025).

== Production ==
=== Broadcast format ===
A photo of the original Coronation Street set and production base at Granada Studios Studio 2 in 1960.

Between 9 December 1960 and 3 March 1961, Coronation Street was broadcast twice weekly, on Wednesday and Friday. During this period, the Friday episode was broadcast live, with the Wednesday episode being pre-recorded 15 minutes later. When the programme was fully networked on 6 March 1961, broadcast days changed to Monday and Wednesday. The last regular episode to be shown live was broadcast on 3 February 1961.

The series was transmitted in black and white for the majority of the 1960s. Preparations were made to film episode 923, to be transmitted Wednesday 29 October 1969, in colour. This instalment featured the street's residents on a coach trip to the Lake District. In the end, suitable colour film stock for the cameras could not be found and the footage was shot in black and white. The following episode, transmitted Monday 3 November, was videotaped in colour but featured black and white film inserts and title sequence. Like BBC1, the ITV network was officially broadcast in black and white at this point (though programmes were actually broadcast in colour as early as July that year for colour transmission testing and adjustment) so the episode was seen by most in black and white.

The ITV network, like BBC1, began full colour transmissions on 15 November 1969. Daran Little, who was the official programme archivist for 11 years, claims that the first episode to be transmitted in colour was episode 930, shown on 24 November 1969. In October 1970, a technicians' dispute turned into the Colour Strike when sound staff were denied a pay rise given to camera staff the year before for working with colour recording equipment. The terms of the work-to-rule were that staff refused to work with the new equipment (though the old black and white equipment had been disposed of by then) and therefore programmes were recorded and transmitted in black and white, including Coronation Street. The dispute was resolved in early 1971 and the last black and white episode was broadcast on 10 February 1971, although the episodes transmitted on 22 and 24 February 1971 had contained black and white location inserts.

From 22 March 2010, Coronation Street was produced in 1080/50i for transmission on HDTV platforms on ITV HD. The first transmission in this format was episode 7351 on 31 May 2010 with a new set of titles and re-recorded theme tune.

On 24 January 2022, ITV announced that as part of an overhaul of their evening programming (including the expansion of the ITV Evening News), Coronation Street would air as three 60-minute episodes per week from March 2022 onwards.

In February 2025, ITV announced that Coronation Street would air as five 30-minute episodes per week beginning in January 2026, and move to an 8:30 pm scheduling as part of an hour-long block with Emmerdale. The network cited that half-hour episodes were "streaming-friendly" and "better provide the opportunity to meet viewer expectations for storyline pace, pay-off and resolution".

=== Production staff ===
Coronation Street's creator, Tony Warren, wrote the first 13 episodes of the programme in 1960, and continued to write for the programme intermittently until 1976. He later became a novelist, but retained links with Coronation Street. Warren died in 2016.

Harry Kershaw was the script editor for Coronation Street when the programme began in 1960, working alongside Tony Warren. Kershaw was also a script writer for the programme and the show's producer between 1962 and 1971. He remains the only person, along with John Finch, to have held the three posts of script editor, writer and producer. Adele Rose was Coronation Street's first female writer and the show's longest-serving writer, completing 455 scripts between 1961 and 1998. She also created Byker Grove. Rose also won a BAFTA award in 1993 for her work on the show.

Bill Podmore was the show's longest serving producer. By the time he stepped down in 1988 he had completed 13 years at the production helm. Nicknamed the "godfather" by the tabloid press, he was renowned for his tough, uncompromising style and was feared by both crew and cast alike. He is known for sacking Peter Adamson, the show's Len Fairclough, in 1983. Iain MacLeod is the current series producer.

Michael Apted, known for the Up! series of documentaries, was a director on the programme in the early 1960s. This period of his career marked the first of his many collaborations with writer Jack Rosenthal. Rosenthal, noted for such television plays as Bar Mitzvah Boy, began his career on the show, writing more than 150 episodes between 1961 and 1969. Paul Abbott was a story editor on the programme in the 1980s and began writing episodes in 1989, but left in 1993 to produce Cracker, for which he later wrote, before creating his own dramas such as Touching Evil and Shameless. Russell T Davies was briefly a storyliner on the programme in the mid-1990s, also writing the script for the direct-to-video special "Viva Las Vegas!" He, too, has become a noted writer of his own high-profile television drama programmes, including Queer as Folk and the 2005 revival of Doctor Who. Jimmy McGovern also wrote some episodes.

=== Theme music ===
The show's theme music, a cornet piece accompanied by a brass band plus clarinet and double bass, reminiscent of northern band music, was written by Eric Spear. The original theme tune was called "Lancashire Blues" and Spear was paid a £6 commission in 1960 to write it.

The identity of the trumpeter was not public knowledge until 1994, when jazz musician and journalist Ron Simmonds revealed that it was the Surrey musician Ronnie Hunt. He added, "an attempt was made in later years to re-record that solo, using Stan Roderick, but it sounded too good, and they reverted to the old one." In 2004, the Manchester Evening News published a contradictory story that a young musician from Wilmslow called David Browning had played the original version. However, after investigating further, his story was found to be false, Browning not knowing that the original trumpet player Ronnie Hunt was still alive, proving that he was the true and rightful player that performed the solo. With his union pay stubs and contract, Browning was proven false.

A new, completely re-recorded version of the theme tune replaced the original when the series started broadcasting in HD on 31 May 2010. It accompanied a new montage-style credits sequence featuring images of Manchester and Weatherfield. A reggae version of the theme tune was recorded by The I-Royals and released by Media Marvels and WEA in 1983.

=== Viewing figures ===
Episodes in the 1960s, 1970s and 1980s, regularly attracted figures of between 18 and 21 million viewers, and during the 1990s and early 2000s, 14 to 16 million per episode would be typical. Like most terrestrial television in the UK, a decline in viewership has taken place and the show posts an average audience of just under 9 million per episode as of 2013, remaining one of the highest rated programmes in the UK. EastEnders and Coronation Street have often competed for the highest rated show.

The episode that aired on 2 January 1985, in which Bet Lynch (Julie Goodyear) finds out she has got the job as manager of the Rovers Return, is the highest-rated single episode in the show's history, attracting 21.40 million viewers. The 25 December 1987 episode, where Hilda Ogden (Jean Alexander) leaves the street to start a new life as a housekeeper for long-term employer Dr Lowther, attracted a combined audience of 26.65 million for its original airing and omnibus repeat on 27 December 1987. This is the second-highest combined rating in the show's history. The show attracted its highest-ever combined rating of 26.93 million for the episode that aired on 15 (and 19) March 1989, where Rita Fairclough (Barbara Knox) is in hospital and Alan Bradley (Mark Eden) is hiding from the police after trying to kill Rita in the previous episode.

By the 2020s, viewing figures dropped owing to increased competition from streaming services and satellite channels, with the usually high-rated Christmas episode being viewed by only 2.6 million households in 2023, down from 2.8 million in 2022 and 8 million a decade previously. However, these figures are based on overnight ratings and do not include viewing via ITV's "catch-up" streaming service.

=== Sets ===
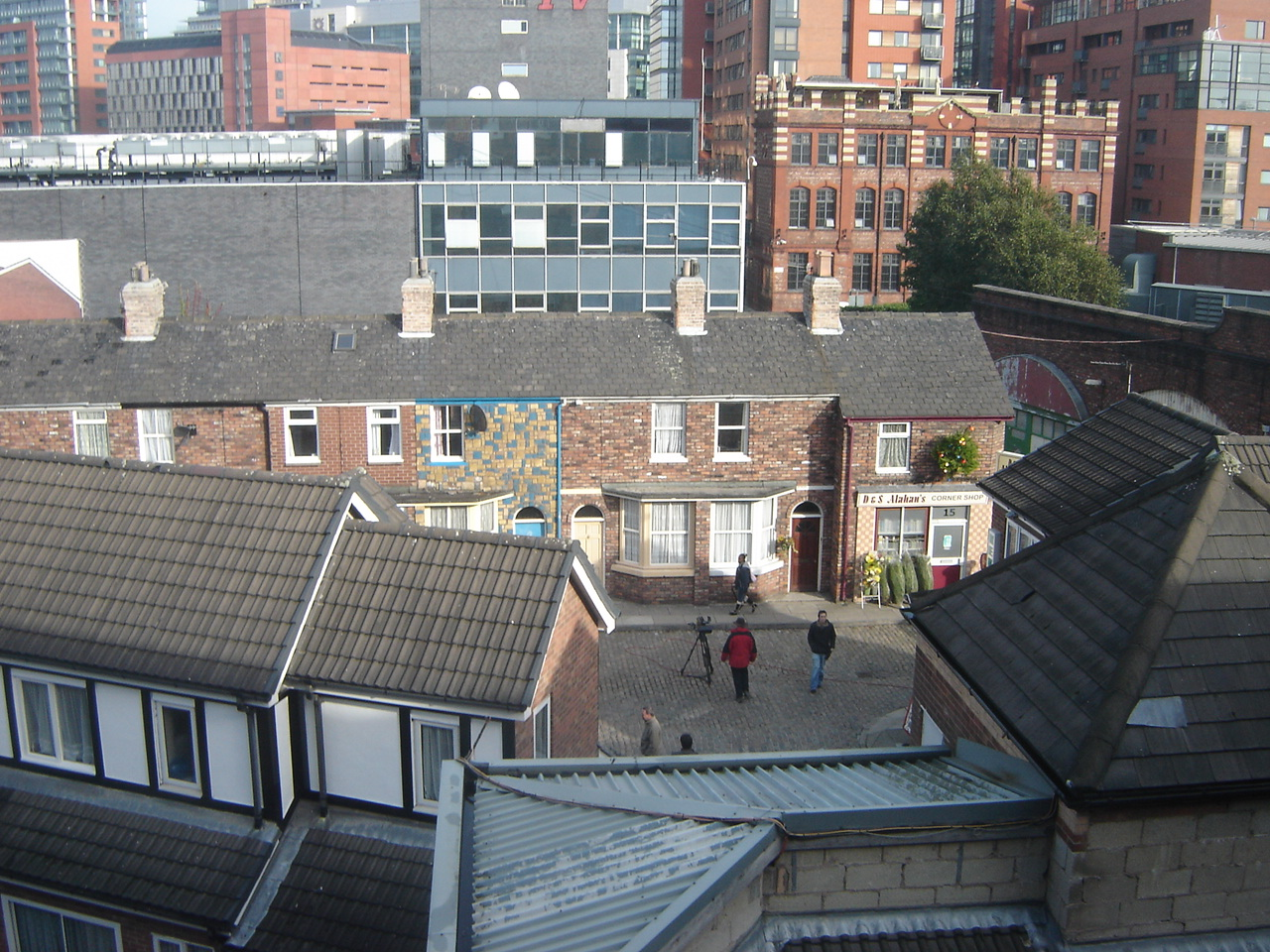
Shot of the former Coronation Street exterior set at Granada Studios. The set is close to Manchester city centre, hence the high-rise buildings, which are not part of the programme.

A photo of the Coronation Street set and production base used since 2013 at MediaCityUK centre in 2020

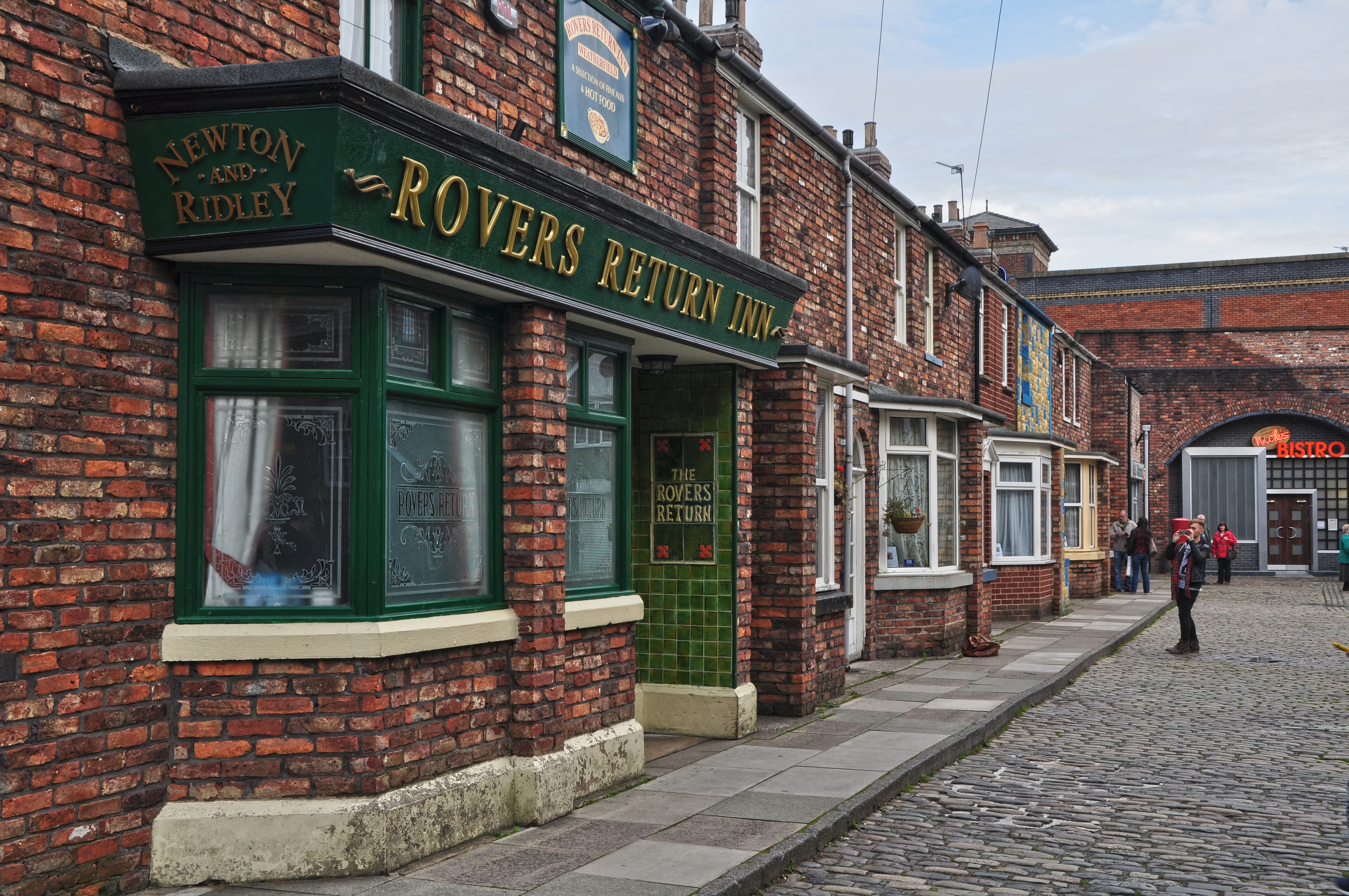
A view down Coronation Street at the old Quay Street set in the Granada Studios backlot, with the Rovers Return Inn pub in the foreground

The regular exterior buildings shown in Coronation Street include a row of terrace houses, several townhouses, and communal areas including a newsagents (The Kabin), a café (Roy's Rolls), a general grocery shop (D&S Alahan's), a factory (Underworld) and Rovers Return Inn public house. The Rovers Return Inn is the main meeting place for the show's characters.

Between 1960 and 1968, street scenes were filmed on a set constructed in-studio, with the house fronts reduced in scale to 3/4 and constructed from wood. In 1968 Granada built an outside set not all that different from the interior version previously used, with the wooden façades from the studio simply being erected on the new site. When the show began broadcasting in colour, these were replaced with brick façades, and back yards were added in the 1970s.

In 1982, a permanent full-street set was built in the Granada backlot, an area between Quay Street and Liverpool Road in Manchester. The set was constructed from reclaimed Salford brick. The set was updated in 1989 with the construction of a new factory, two shop units and three modern town houses on the south side of the street.

Between 1989 and 1999, the Granada Studios Tour allowed members of the public to visit the set. The exterior set was extended and updated in 1999. This update added to the Rosamund Street and Victoria Street façades, and added a viaduct on Rosamund Street. Most interior scenes were shot in the adjoining purpose-built studio.

In 2008, Victoria Court, an apartment building full of luxury flats, was started on Victoria Street.

In 2014, production moved to a new site at Trafford Wharf, a former dock area about two miles to the east, part of the MediaCityUK complex. The Trafford Wharf backlot is built upon a former truck stop site next to the Imperial War Museum North. It took two years from start to finish to recreate the iconic Street. The houses were built to almost full scale after previously being three-quarter size. On 5 April 2014, the staff began to allow booked public visits to the old Quay Street set. An advert, with a voiceover from Victoria Wood, appeared on TV to advertise the tour. The tour was discontinued in December 2015.

On 12 March 2018, the extension of the Victoria Street set was officially unveiled. The new set featured a garden, featuring a memorial bench paying tribute to the 22 victims of the Manchester Arena bombing, including a named tribute to Coronation Street "super fan" Martyn Hett. The precinct includes a Greater Manchester Police station called Weatherfield Police station, and a tram stop station, which is named Weatherfield North with Transport for Greater Manchester Metrolink branding. The set also includes two dedicated product placement store fronts, originally branded as Costa Coffee and Co-op Food locations. The Costa shop was later replaced by EE and then Hays Travel, while the Co-op became a Sainsbury's Argos location in 2024 as part of Argos's sponsorship deal with the show. Exterior scenes at the new set first aired on 20 April 2018.

On 20 April 2018, ITV announced that they had been granted official approval of planning permission to allow booked public visits to the MediaCityUK Trafford Wharf set. Tours commenced on weekends from 26 May 2018 onwards. The set was further expanded in March 2022, with the addition of the Weatherfield Precinct, which took six months to build, and was inspired by Salford. The new section of the set included a two-storey construction featuring maisonettes, a staircase and balcony leading to the properties, a piazza and an array of shops and units.

== Broadcast ==
=== United Kingdom ===
For 60 years, Coronation Street has remained at the centre of ITV's prime time schedule. Since January 2026 the programme is shown in the UK as 30 minute episodes over five evenings a week on ITV in the 8.30pm time slot – Monday to Friday. Additional episodes have been broadcast at other times, such as between 22 and 26 November 2004, when eight episodes were shown, including three 10pm outings. These late night episodes allowed for more graphic content when "Mad" Maya (Maya Sharma) sought her revenge on Dev Alahan and Sunita Alahan.

From Friday 9 December 1960 until Friday 3 March 1961, the programme was shown in two episodes broadcast on Wednesday and Friday at 7 pm. Schedules were changed, and from Monday 6 March 1961 until Wednesday 11 October 1989, the programme was shown in two episodes broadcast Monday and Wednesday at 7:30 pm. A third weekly episode was introduced on Friday 20 October 1989, broadcast at 7:30 pm. From 1996, an extra episode was broadcast at 7:30 pm on Sunday nights.

Aside from Granada, the programme originally appeared on the following stations of the ITV network: Anglia Television, Associated-Rediffusion, Television Wales and the West, Scottish Television, Southern Television and Ulster Television. From episode 14 on Wednesday 25 January 1961, Tyne Tees Television broadcast the programme. That left ATV in the Midlands as the only ITV station not carrying the show. When they decided to broadcast the programme, national transmission was changed from Wednesday and Friday at 7 pm to Monday and Wednesday at 7:30 pm and the programme became fully networked under this new arrangement from episode 25 on Monday 6 March 1961.

As the ITV network grew over the next few years, the programme was transmitted by these new stations on these dates onward: Westward Television from episode 40 on 1 May 1961, Border Television from episode 76 on 4 September 1961, Grampian Television from episode 84 on 2 October 1961, Channel Television from episode 180 on 3 September 1962 and Teledu Cymru (north and west Wales) from episode 184 on 17 September 1962. At this point, the ITV network became complete and the programme was broadcast almost continuously across the country at 7:30 pm on Monday and Wednesday for the next twenty-eight years.

From episode 2981 on Friday 20 October 1989 at 7:30 pm, a third weekly episode was introduced and this increased to four episodes a week from episode 4096 on Sunday 24 November 1996, again at 7:30 pm. A second Monday episode was introduced in 2002 and was broadcast at 8:30 pm to usher in the return of Bet Lynch. The Monday 8:30 pm episode was used intermittently during the popular Richard Hillman storyline and became a regular feature from episode 5568 on Monday 25 August 2003.

In January 2008, ITV axed the Sunday episode, and instead aired a second episode on Fridays, at 8:30 pm, with the final Sunday episode airing on 6 January 2008, though some episodes thereafter continued to air occasionally on Sundays, usually for when an episode was displaced from one of its regular slots by a live football match. From 23 July 2009 to September 2012 the Wednesday show was replaced with an episode at 8:30 pm on Thursdays. A sixth weekly episode was added on Wednesdays at 8:30 pm from 20 September 2017.

In March 2020, it was revealed that episodes that were currently filming for future broadcast (as episodes are filmed a few weeks in advance) during the COVID-19 pandemic would be shown differently. Instead of six episodes a week, only three episodes would be broadcast, airing as normal on a Monday, Wednesday and Friday at the normal timeslot of 7:30 pm. The actions provided would be made effective starting from 30 March. Simultaneously, the announcement also mentioned that the elderly cast of the show would be "written off" owing to health advice issued by Public Health England and the NHS. On 22 March, ITV released a statement confirming that filming of both Coronation Street and Emmerdale was suspended.

In June 2020, ITV announced that filming would resume on 9 June. However, owing to the new health and safety measures, cast members over the age of 70 or with underlying health conditions did not return to set until the production could determine it was safe for them to do so.

In July 2020, ITV announced that Coronation Street would return to the normal output of six episodes a week in September that year.

In October 2020, Maureen Lipman and David Neilson made their first appearances since July that year, as all cast members over the age of 70 had temporarily left the series earlier in the year. William Roache, Barbara Knox and Sue Nicholls returned in December.

On 22 January 2021, ITV announced that filming would be suspended from 25 January in order to rewrite "stories and scripts as a consequence of the coronavirus pandemic" and to "review all health and safety requirements". ITV also confirmed that this decision would not affect their ability to deliver six episodes a week.

In January 2022, it was announced that after 60 years in the 7.30 pm slot, Coronation Street's transmission time would move to 8 pm owing to the ITV Evening News having a longer duration, pushing Emmerdale into the 7.30 pm slot on weeknights. The double-bill episodes on Mondays, Wednesdays and Fridays have merged into hour-long slots on these days. The new scheduling went live on Monday 7 March 2022.

==== Repeats and classic episodes ====
Repeat episodes, omnibus broadcasts and specials have been shown on various ITV channels. After several years on ITV2, in January 2008 the omnibus returned to the main ITV channel, where it was aired on Saturday mornings or afternoons, depending on the schedule and times.

In May 2008, it moved to Sunday mornings, until August 2008, when it returned to Saturdays. In January 2009, it moved back to Sunday mornings, usually broadcasting at around 9.25am until December 2010. In January 2011, the omnibus moved to Saturday mornings on ITV at 9.25am. During the Rugby World Cup, which took place in New Zealand, matches had to be broadcast on a Saturday morning, so the omnibus moved to Saturday lunchtimes/afternoons during September and October 2011. On 22 October 2011, the omnibus moved back to Saturday mornings at 9.25am on ITV. In January 2012, the omnibus moved to ITV2, and then moved to ITV3 in January 2020. In January 2022, the omnibus moved back to ITV2. It was quietly dropped in April 2023 because of the widespread availability of on-demand streaming.

Older episodes were broadcast by satellite and cable channel Granada Plus from its launch in 1996. The first episodes shown were from episode 1588 (originally transmitted on Monday 5 April 1976) onwards. Originally listed and promoted as Classic Coronation Street, the "classic" was dropped in early 2002, at which stage the episodes were from late 1989. By the time of the channel's closure in 2004, the repeats had reached February 1994.

In addition to this, "specials" were broadcast on Saturday afternoons in the early years of the channel, with several episodes based on a particular theme or character(s) shown. The last episode shown in these specials was from 1991. In addition, on 27 and 28 December 2003, several Christmas Day editions of the show were broadcast.

ITV3 began airing afternoon timeslot sequential reruns of Classic Coronation Street from 2 October 2017. Two classic episodes were retransmitted from Mondays to Fridays at 2:40 pm until 3:45 pm, starting from episode 2587 (originally transmitted on Wednesday 15 January 1986) onwards.

To mark the 60th anniversary of Coronation Street, between 7 and 11 December 2020 at 10:00 pm–11:05 pm, ITV3 aired special episodes of the soap including Episode 1, the tenth anniversary episode from December 1970, two episodes from the twentieth anniversary in December 1980, two episodes from the thirtieth anniversary in December 1990, the 2000 live episode from the fortieth anniversary in December 2000, and the fiftieth anniversary episode, which aired after a repeat of The Road to Coronation Street.

On Easter Monday 2022, to commemorate the upcoming 90th birthday of William Roache, eight special Coronation Street Ken Barlow episodes were aired on 18 April 2022, at 10:25 am–2:35 pm. The episodes shown were Episode 1 from December 1960, Ken and Deirdre Tie the Knot from July 1981, Ken's Affair from December 1989, Deirdre's Fling from January 2003, Steve and Karen's Wedding Shocker from February 2004, Ken and Deirdre's Second Wedding from April 2005, Ken and Deirdre's Holiday from August 2014, and Deirdre's Death from July 2015.

=== International broadcast ===
Coronation Street is shown in various countries worldwide. YouTube has the first episode and many others available as reruns.

The programme was first aired in Australia in 1963 on TCN-9 Sydney, GTV-9 Melbourne and NWS-9 Adelaide, and by 1966 Coronation Street was more popular in Australia than in the UK. The show eventually left free-to-air television in Australia. It briefly returned to the Nine Network in a daytime slot during 1994–1995. In 2005, STW-9 Perth began to show episodes before the 6 pm news to improve the lead in to Nine News Perth, but this did not work and the show was cancelled a few months later. In 1996, pay-TV began and Arena began screening the series in one-hour instalments on Saturdays and Sundays at 6:30 pm EST. The series was later moved to pay-TV channel UKTV (now BBC UKTV), where it is still shown. Coronation Street is shown Mon-Thu at 7:20 pm EST and a double episode on Fridays, with episodes on the channel being one week behind UK broadcast.

In Canada, Coronation Street is broadcast on CBC Television. Until 2011, episodes were shown in Canada approximately 10 months after they aired in Britain; however, beginning in the fall of 2011, the CBC began showing two episodes every weekday, in order to catch up with the ITV showings, at 6:30 pm and 7 pm local time Monday-Friday, with an omnibus on Sundays at 7.30am. By May 2014, the CBC was only two weeks behind Britain, so the show was reduced to a single showing weeknights at 6:30 pm local time. The show debuted on Toronto's CBLT in July 1966. The 2002 edition of the Guinness Book of Records recognises the 1,144 episodes sold to the now-defunct CBC-owned Saskatoon, Saskatchewan, TV station CBKST by Granada TV on 31 May 1971 to be the largest number of TV shows ever purchased in one transaction. The show traditionally aired on weekday afternoons in Canada, with a Sunday morning omnibus. In 2004, CBC moved the weekday airings from their daytime slot to prime time. In light of austerity measures imposed on the CBC in 2012, which includes further cutbacks on non-Canadian programming, one of the foreign shows to remain on the CBC schedule is Coronation Street, according to the CBC's director of content planning Christine Wilson, who commented: "Unofficially I can tell you Coronation Street is coming back. If it didn't come back, something would happen on Parliament Hill." Kirstine Stewart, the head of the CBC's English-language division, once remarked: "Coronation Street fans are the most loyal, except maybe for curling viewers, of all CBC viewers." As of mid 2022, Canada is about three weeks behind the UK and airs six episodes per week.

In Ireland, Coronation Street is currently shown on Virgin Media One. The show was first aired in 1978, when RTÉ2 began showing episodes from 1976, although Ireland caught up with the current UK episodes in 1983. In 1992 it moved to RTÉ One, but in 2001 Granada TV bought 45 percent of TV3, and so TV3 broadcast the series from 2001 to 2014. In 2006, ITV sold its share of the channel but TV3 continued to buy the soap until the end of 2014 when it moved to UTV Ireland. Coronation Street has broadcast on each of the main Irish networks, except for the Irish language network TG4. In December 2016, Coronation Street returned to TV3 (now Virgin Media One). The show is consistently the channel's most viewed programme every week.

Two Dutch stations have broadcast Coronation Street: VARA showed 428 episodes between 1967 and 1975, and SBS6 ran the show for a period starting in 2010. From 2006 the series was also broadcast by Vitaya, a small Flemish Belgian channel.

In New Zealand, Coronation Street has been shown locally since 1964, first on NZBC television until 1975, and then on TV One, which broadcasts it in a 4-episode/2-hour block on Fridays from 7:30 pm. In September 2014, TV One added a 2-episode/1-hour block on Saturday from 8:30 pm. Because TV One did not upgrade to showing the equivalent of five or six episodes per week, New Zealand continued to fall further and further behind with episodes, and was 23 months behind Britain by March 2014. During the weekday nights of the week ending 11 April 2014 and previous weeks, Coronation Street was the least watched programme on TV One in the 7:30 pm slot by a considerable margin in comparison to other weeknights, The serial aired on Tuesdays and Thursdays at 7:30 pm until October 2011, when the show moved to a 5:30 pm half-hour slot every weekday. The move proved unpopular with fans, and the series was quickly moved into its present prime-time slot within weeks. Episodes 7883, 7884, 7885 and 7886 were screened on 16 May 2014. These were originally aired in the UK between 4 and 11 June 2012. On 10 May 2018, it was announced that the current 2016 episodes would be moved to 1 p.m. Monday-Friday titled "Catch-up Episodes" and for primetime Wednesday-Friday express episodes would be airing in New Zealand a week behind the United Kingdom titled "2018 Episodes" these changes would be taking place from 11 June 2018.

In South Africa, Coronation Street episodes were broadcast three days after the UK air date on ITV Choice until the channel ceased broadcasting in June 2020, episodes temporarily went off the air until they moved to M-Net City, starting in October 2020.

In the United States, Coronation Street is available by broadcast or cable only in northern markets where CBC coverage from Canada overlaps the border or is available on local cable systems. It was broadcast on CBC's US cable channel, Trio until the CBC sold its stake in the channel to Universal, before it was shut down in 2006. Beginning in 2009, episodes were available in the United States through Amazon.com's on-demand service, a month behind their original UK airdates. The final series of shows available from Amazon appears to be from November 2012, as no new episodes have been uploaded. On 15 January 2013, online distributor Hulu began airing episodes of the show, posting a new episode daily, two weeks after their original airdates. For a time, Hulu's website stated: "New episodes of Coronation Street will be unavailable as of April 7th, 2016", with the same being said for British soap Hollyoaks, but Hulu is once again showing new episodes of Coronation Street as of April 2017, two weeks behind the UK airdate. The BBC/ITV service Britbox shows new episodes on the same day as the UK airing. Coronation Street was also shown on USA Network for an unknown period starting in 1982.

HM Forces and their families stationed overseas can watch Coronation Street on ITV, carried by the British Forces Broadcasting Service, which is also available to civilians in the Falkland Islands. It used to be shown on BFBS1.

Satellite channel ITV Choice showed the programme in Asia, Middle East, Cyprus, and Malta, before the channel ceased broadcasting in 2019.

== Merchandise ==
The Street, a magazine dedicated to the show, was launched in 1989. Edited by Bill Hill, the magazine contained a summary of recent storylines, interviews, articles about classic episodes, and stories that occurred from before 1960. The format was initially A5 size, expanding to A4 from the seventh issue. The magazine folded after issue 23 in 1993 when the publisher's contract with Granada Studios Tour expired and Granada wanted to produce its own magazine.

In 2009, a video game of the show was announced for Nintendo DS. The game was developed by Mindscape, and reportedly allowed players to complete tasks in the fictitious town of Weatherfield. It was cancelled for unknown reasons.

On 22 July 2011, a video game based on the show titled Coronation Street: The Mystery of the Missing Hotpot Recipe was released for CD-ROM. It was developed and published by Avanquest Software.

=== Discography ===
In 1995, to commemorate the programme's 35th anniversary, a CD titled The Coronation Street Album was released, featuring cover versions of modern songs and standards by contemporary cast members.

The album charted a Top 40 hit when "The Coronation Street Single" (a double a-side featuring a cover of Monty Python's "Always Look on the Bright Side of Life" by Bill Waddington – with various cast members on backing vocals – on one side and "Something Stupid" by Johnny Briggs & Amanda Barrie on the other) reached number 35 in the Official UK charts.

In 2010, an album featuring songs sung by cast members was released to celebrate 50 years of Coronation Street. The album is titled Rogues, Angels, Heroes & Fools, and was later developed into a musical.

== Spin-offs ==
=== Television ===
Granada launched one spin-off in 1965, Pardon the Expression, following the story of clothing store manager Leonard Swindley (Arthur Lowe) after he left Weatherfield. Swindley's management experience was tested when he was appointed assistant manager at a fictional department store, Dobson and Hawks. Granada produced two series of the spin-off, which ended in 1966.

In 1967, Arthur Lowe returned as Leonard Swindley in Turn Out the Lights, a short-lived sequel to Pardon the Expression. It ran for just one series of six episodes before it was cancelled.

In 1972, Neville Buswell and Graham Haberfield starred as Ray Langton and Jerry Booth in a pilot for a potential spin-off series called Rest Assured. Written and produced by H.V. Kershaw, the pilot had an episode title of Lift Off, and featured Fred Feast (later cast as Fred Gee in Coronation Street) as a lift engineer. No series was commissioned.

From 1985 to 1988, Granada TV produced a sitcom called The Brothers McGregor featuring a pair of half-brothers (one black, one white) who had appeared in a single episode of Coronation Street as old friends of Eddie Yeats and guests at his wedding. The original actors were unavailable so the characters were recast with Paul Barber and Philip Whitchurch. The show ran for 26 episodes over four series.

In 1985, a sister series, Albion Market, was launched. It ran for one year, with 100 episodes produced.

==== Crossovers ====
In 2010, several actors from the show appeared on The Jeremy Kyle Show as their soap characters: David Platt (Jack P. Shepherd), Nick Tilsley (Ben Price), Tina McIntyre (Michelle Keegan) and Graeme Proctor (Craig Gazey). In the fictional, semi-improvised scenario, David accused Nick (his brother) and Tina (his ex-girlfriend) of sleeping together.

Coronation Street and rival soap opera EastEnders had a crossover for Children in Need in November 2010 called "East Street". EastEnders stars that visited Weatherfield include Laurie Brett as Jane Beale, Charlie G. Hawkins as Darren Miller, Kylie Babbington as Jodie Gold, Nina Wadia as Zainab Masood and John Partridge as Christian Clarke.

On 21 December 2012, Coronation Street produced a Text Santa special entitled A Christmas Corrie, which featured Norris Cole in the style of Scrooge, being visited by the ghosts of dead characters. The ghosts were Mike Baldwin, Maxine Peacock, Derek Wilton and Vera Duckworth. Other special guests include Torvill and Dean, Lorraine Kelly and Sheila Reid. The episode concluded with Norris learning the error of his ways and dancing on the cobbles. The original plan for this feature was to have included Jack Duckworth, along with Vera, but actor Bill Tarmey died before filming commenced. In the end a recording of his voice was played. A crossover with ITV's other soap Emmerdale, known as Corriedale, was announced in late 2025 and broadcast on ITV1 and ITVX at 8 p.m. on 5 January 2026.

==== Documentaries ====
Coronation Street: Family Album was several documentaries about various families living on the street.

"Farewell ..." was several documentaries featuring the best moments of a single character who had recently left the series—most notably, Farewell Mike (Baldwin), Farewell Vera (Duckworth), Farewell Blanche (Hunt), Farewell Jack (Duckworth), Farewell Janice (Battersby), Farewell Liz (McDonald), Farewell Becky (McDonald), and Farewell Tina (McIntyre). Most of these were broadcast on the same day as the character's final scenes in the series.

Stars on the Street was aired around Christmas 2009. It featured actors from the soap talking about the famous guest stars who had appeared in the series including people who were in it before they were famous.

In December 2010, ITV made a few special programmes to mark the 50th anniversary. Coronation Street Uncovered: Live, hosted by Stephen Mulhern was shown after the episode with the tram crash was aired on ITV2. On 7 and 9 December, a countdown on the greatest Corrie moments, Coronation Street: 50 Years, 50 Moments, the viewers voted "The Barlows at Alcoholics Anonymous" as the greatest moment. On 10 December Paul O'Grady hosted a quiz show, Coronation Street: The Big 50 with three teams from the soap and a celebrity team answering questions about Coronation Street and other soaps. Also, Come Dine with Me and Celebrity Juice aired Coronation Street specials in the anniversary week.

==== International adaptation ====
The German TV series Lindenstraße took Coronation Street as the model. Lindenstraße started in 1985 and broadcast its final episode on 29 March 2020, after airing for nearly 35 years.

=== Films ===
Over the years, Coronation Street has released several straight-to-video films. Unlike other soaps, which often used straight-to-video films to cover more contentious plot lines that may not be allowed by the broadcaster, Coronation Street has largely used these films to reset their characters in other locations.

In 1995, Coronation Street: The Cruise also known as Coronation Street: The Feature Length Special was released on VHS to celebrate the 35th anniversary of the show, featuring Rita Sullivan, Mavis Wilton, Alec Gilroy, Curly Watts and Raquel Watts. ITV heavily promoted the programme as a direct-to-video exclusive, but broadcast a brief version of it on 24 March 1996. The Independent Television Commission investigated the broadcast, as viewers complained that ITV misled them.

In 1997, following the controversial cruise spin-off, Coronation Street: Viva Las Vegas! was released on VHS, featuring Vera Duckworth, Jack Duckworth, Fiona Middleton and Maxine Peacock on a trip to Las Vegas, which included the temporary return of Ray Langton (Neville Buswell).

In 1999, six special episodes of Coronation Street were produced, following the story of Steve McDonald and Vikram Desai in Brighton, which included the temporary returns of Bet Gilroy, Reg Holdsworth and Vicky McDonald. This video was titled Coronation Street: After Hours and released on VHS.

In 2008, ITV announced filming was to get underway for a new special DVD episode, Coronation Street: Out of Africa, featuring Kirk Sutherland, Fiz Brown, Chesney Brown, which included the temporary return of Cilla Battersby-Brown. Sophie Webster, Becky Granger and Tina McIntyre also make brief appearances.

In 2009, another DVD special, Coronation Street: Romanian Holiday, was released. The feature-length comedy drama followed Roy, Hayley and Becky as they travelled to Romania for the wedding of a face from their past. Eddie Windass also briefly appears.

The BBC commissioned a one-off drama called The Road to Coronation Street, about how the series first came into being. Jessie Wallace plays Pat Phoenix (Elsie Tanner) with Lynda Baron as Violet Carson (Ena Sharples), Celia Imrie as Doris Speed (Annie Walker) and James Roache as his own father William Roache (Ken Barlow). It was broadcast on 16 September 2010 on BBC Four.

On 1 November 2010, Coronation Street: A Knight's Tale was released. Reg Holdsworth and Curly Watts returned in the film. Mary tries to take Norris to an apparently haunted castle where she hoped to seduce him. Rosie gets a job there and she takes Jason with her. Brian Capron also guest starred as an assumed relative of Richard Hillman. He rises out of a lake with a comedic "wink to the audience" after Hillman drowned in 2003. Rita Sullivan also briefly appears.

=== Online ===
On 21 December 2008, a web-based miniseries ran on ITV.com; called Corrie Confidential; the first episode featured the characters Rosie and Sophie Webster in Underworld.

ITV.com launched a small spin-off drama series called Gary's Army Diaries, which revolves around Gary Windass's experiences in Afghanistan and the loss of his best friend, Quinny. Owing to their popularity, the three five-minute episodes were recut into a single 30-minute episode, which was broadcast on ITV2.

William Roache and Anne Kirkbride starred as Ken and Deirdre in a series of ten three-minute internet "webisodes". The first episode of the series titled, Ken and Deirdre's Bedtime Stories, was activated on Valentine's Day 2011.

In 2011, an internet-based spin-off starring Helen Flanagan as Rosie Webster followed her on her quest to be a supermodel called Just Rosie.

On 3 February 2014, another web-based miniseries ran on ITV.com; called Streetcar Stories. It showed what Steve and Lloyd get up to during the late nights in their Streetcar cab office. The first episode shows Steve and Lloyd making a cup of tea with "The Stripper" playing in the background, referencing Morecambe and Wise's Breakfast Sketch. The second episode involves the pair having a biscuit dunking competition.

During the "Who Attacked Ken?" storyline, a mini-series of police files was run on the official Coronation Street YouTube channel. They outlined the suspects' details and possible motives.

=== Stage ===
In August 2010, many Coronation Street characters were brought to the stage in Jonathan Harvey's comedy play Corrie!. The play was commissioned to celebrate the 50th Anniversary of the TV series and was presented at The Lowry in Salford, England by ITV Studios and Phil McIntyre Entertainments. Featuring a cast of six actors who alternate roles of favourite characters including Ena Sharples, Hilda Ogden, Hayley and Roy, Richard Hillman, Jack and Vera, Bet Lynch, Steve, Karen and Becky, the play weaves together some of the most memorable moments from the TV show. It toured UK theatres between February 2011 and July 2011 with guest star narrators including Roy Barraclough, Ken Morley and Gaynor Faye.

== In popular culture ==
The British rock band Queen produced a single "I Want to Break Free" in 1984 that reached number 3 in the UK Singles Chart. The song is memorable for its music video in which the band members dressed in women's clothing, which parodied characters in Coronation Street and is considered a homage to the show. The video depicts Freddie Mercury as a housewife, loosely based on Bet Lynch, who wants to "break free" from his life. Although Lynch was a blonde in the soap opera, Mercury thought he would look too silly as a blonde and chose a dark wig. Guitarist Brian May plays another, more relaxed housewife based on Hilda Ogden.

In December 2022, the American singer Bob Dylan was offered a cameo on Coronation Street after revealing to The Wall Street Journal that he is a fan of the ITV soap.

== Sponsorship ==
Cadbury was the first sponsor of Coronation Street, beginning in July 1996. In summer 2006, Cadbury Trebor Bassetts had to recall more than one million chocolate bars, owing to suspected salmonella contamination, and Coronation Street stopped the sponsorship for several months. In 2006, Cadbury did not renew its contract, but agreed to sponsor the show until Coronation Street found a new sponsor.

Harveys then sponsored Coronation Street from 30 September 2007 until December 2012. In the Coronation Street: Romanian Holiday film, Roy and Hayley Cropper are filmed in front of a Harveys store, and in Coronation Street: A Knights Tale, a Harveys truck can be seen driving past Mary Taylor's motorhome. Compare the Market took over as sponsor from 26 November 2012 until 30 November 2020. On 10 December 2020, it was announced that Argos would be the new sponsor of Coronation Street, starting on 1 January 2021.

In November 2011, a Nationwide Building Society ATM in Dev Alahan's corner shop became the first use of paid-for product placement in a UK primetime show. In 2018, the shop fronts of Co-Op and Costa Coffee were added to the sets, along with characters using shopping bags with the respective logos on as props.

Hyundai have been the sponsor since January 2015 in the Republic of Ireland, aired on Virgin Media One. This ended in March 2026 and the show currently has no sponsor in Ireland.

Year	Title	Country
1996–2007	Cadbury's	UK
2007–2012	Harvey's	UK
2012–2020	Compare the Market	UK
2015–2026	Hyundai	Republic of Ireland
2021–present	Argos	UK

== Print references ==
- Collier, Katherine (2008) [2003]. Coronation Street: The Epic Novel. Updated by Glenda Young. London: Carlton. ISBN 978-0-233-05097-3.
- Egan, Sean (2010). 50 Years of Coronation Street: The (Very) Unofficial Story. London: JR Books. ISBN 978-1-906779-80-1.
- Hanson, David; Kingston, Jo (1999). Coronation St.: Access All Areas. London: Andre Deutsch. ISBN 978-0-233-99722-3.
- Hardy, Katherine (2008) [2004]. Coronation Street: The Complete Saga: Over Four Decades of Life on the Street: An Epic Novel of Life in 'the Street' from 1960 to the Present Day. Updated by Glenda Young. Carlton. ISBN 978-0233002477.
- Kershaw, H. V. (1981). The Street Where I Live. London: Granada. ISBN 978-0-246-11734-2.
- Little, Daran (1995). The Coronation Street Story. London: Boxtree. ISBN 978-1-85283-464-7.
- Little, Daran (1998). The Women of Coronation Street. London: Boxtree. ISBN 978-0-7522-2443-5.
- Little, Daran (2000). 40 Years of Coronation Street. London: Andre Deutsch. ISBN 978-0-233-99806-0.
- Little, Daran (2002). Who's Who on Coronation Street. London: Andre Deutsch. ISBN 978-0-233-99994-4.
- Podmore, Bill; Reece, Peter (1990). Coronation Street: The Inside Story. London: Macdonald. ISBN 978-0-356-17971-1.
- Randall, Tim (2010). Fifty Years of Coronation Street. London: Headline Publishing Group. ISBN 978-0-7553-1846-9.
- Tinker, Jack (1987). Coronation Street: A fully illustrated record of television's most popular serial. London: Treasure Press. ISBN 978-0-86273-240-0.

== Video and DVD references ==
- This Is Coronation Street, Dir: John Black (DVD) Acorn Media Publishing, 2003
- Coronation Street: Secrets, Dir: John Black (DVD) Morningstar Entertainment, 2004
- Coronation Street: Early Days, (Video) Granada Media Group, 2001
- Coronation Street: The Jubilee Years, (Video) Granada Media Group, 1985
- Coronation Street: The Magic of, (Video) Granada Media Group, 1985
