= Arthur Lowe =

English actor (1915–1982)

- Lowe as Captain Mainwaring in Dad's Army
- Born: 22 September 1915; Hayfield, Derbyshire, England
- Died: 15 April 1982 (aged 66); Birmingham, England
- Resting place: Sutton Coldfield Crematorium, Birmingham, England
- Occupation: Actor
- Years active: 1945–1982
- Known for: Coronation Street; Dad's Army
- Spouse: Joan Cooper (m. 1948)
- Children: 1
- Military career
- Allegiance: United Kingdom
- Branch: British Army Royal Electrical and Mechanical Engineers
- Service years: 1939–1945
- Rank: Sergeant Major
- Conflicts: Second World War

Signature
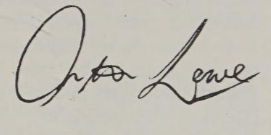

Arthur Lowe (22 September 1915 – 15 April 1982) was an English actor. His acting career spanned 37 years, including starring roles in numerous theatre and television productions. He played Captain Mainwaring in the wartime sitcom Dad's Army from 1968 until 1977, was nominated for seven BAFTAs and became one of the most recognised faces on UK television. He won his only BAFTA, the Award for Best Actor in a Supporting Role, for his performance in O Lucky Man! (1973).

Lowe began acting professionally in England in 1945, after army service in the Second World War. He worked in theatre, film and television throughout the 1950s but it was not until he landed the part of Leonard Swindley in the television soap Coronation Street in 1960 that he came to national attention. He played the character until 1965, while continuing theatre and other acting work.

In 1968, he took on his role in Dad's Army, written by Jimmy Perry and David Croft. The profile he gained from the role led to further character roles. Despite increasingly poor health in his final years, he maintained a busy professional schedule until his death from a stroke on 15 April 1982, aged 66.

== Early life ==
Lowe was born on 22 September 1915 in Hayfield, Derbyshire, the only child of Arthur Lowe (1888–1971) and his wife, Mary Annie (née Ford; 1885–1981). Lowe's father, known as "Big Arthur" due to his height, worked for the Great Central Railway and took up a job as clerk at London Road Station, Manchester in 1916, shortly before being called up for service in the First World War. The family rented a house in Hemmons Road, Levenshulme, where "Little Arthur" (as he was known) attended Chapel Street School. From about 1927 he went to Alma Park School, where one of his first stage performances was in a school production of The Grand Cham's Diamond in December 1929.

Lowe's intention to join the Merchant Navy was thwarted by his poor eyesight. His first job after leaving school was as a barrow boy for the Manchester branch of motor accessory company Brown Brothers. After progressing to the role of clerk within the firm he took up a job at the aircraft factory of the Fairey Aviation Company in 1936. He described his job of progress chaser as "a sort of time and motion man chivvying the fellows along and seeing that they produced a certain amount of work each day". He also had to check that the parts for building the planes were where they needed to be on the production line.

== War service ==
In February 1939, Lowe joined the Territorial Army and served in the Second World War, with the Duke of Lancaster's Own Yeomanry. Initially training with horses, the regiment soon became a mechanised unit of the Royal Artillery. Lowe was medically regraded due to his poor eyesight and after training in wireless and as a radar technician transferred to the Royal Army Ordnance Corps. After working on searchlights in Lincolnshire he was sent out to Egypt in 1942, where he soon transferred to the Royal Electrical and Mechanical Engineers. He was a good horseman and learned to speak Arabic. After a period in the Suez Canal Zone he was stationed at the REME's 15th Radio Repair Workshops at Rafah.

Lowe soon found outlets for developing his talents in entertainment. He was known among the troopers for his impressions of officers and crooners, and when radio equipment was stolen, he read the BBC News over his camp's PA system. In January 1943 he called a meeting to form an amateur dramatics group, the REME No. 1 Welfare Club Dramatic Society. "It was sheer bloody boredom that did it", he said later, "and after that I was hooked". He took his first appearance on stage in The Monkey's Paw on 8 February 1943 and continued both to organise and act in plays, as well as a Christmas revue. His efforts led to a posting with the No. 2 Field Entertainment Unit, promoted to the rank of sergeant major. In this role he helped outlying units to produce their own shows. He assisted Martin Benson in establishing the Mercury Theatre in Alexandria, including in production and management, but not as an actor.

Following the end of the war, Lowe returned to Britain in November 1945, although he was not officially demobbed until March 1946.

== Acting career ==
=== Early career ===
In 1945, Lowe's father was organising special railway trips and excursions, including private trains for circuses and theatre companies. He arranged an audition for Lowe with Eric Norman for the Frank H. Fortescue Famous Players repertory company. Lowe was immediately offered a trial in the comedy play Bedtime Story, in which he took the part of Dickson. In this role he made his professional acting debut at the Manchester Repertory Theatre on 17 December 1945. He was paid £5 per week for twice-nightly performances. In eight months with Fortescue's he appeared in 33 plays and gave 396 performances.

During this time Lowe began a romantic relationship with Joan Cooper (1922–1989), a married actress in the company whose husband also began an affair at about the same time. Arthur and Joan were engaged in June 1946 and lived together from August. After Joan's divorce came through they married at a register office in Robert Adam Street, The Strand, London, on 10 January 1948. Joan had a son, David Gatehouse, from her first marriage. Another son, Stephen Lowe, was born on 23 January 1953. The couple remained together until Lowe's death.

Lowe worked with repertory companies around the country. After a year at the County Theatre, Hereford, 1946–1947, he moved to London in 1948 and for the next three years mostly worked in South London theatres. An early brief film role was as a reporter for the Tit-Bits magazine, near the end of the Ealing Studios dark comedy classic Kind Hearts and Coronets (1949). His first West End role came in 1950, as Wilson the butler in Guy Bolton's Larger Than Life. Lowe became known for his character roles, which in 1952 included a breakthrough part as Senator Brockbank in the musical Call Me Madam at the London Coliseum. Other roles in musicals included a part in the 1954 London revival of Pal Joey and eighteen months as the salesman in the first West End production of The Pajama Game, from 1955 to 1957. His name first appeared in lights in 1957, at the Piccadilly Theatre, with the part of Bert Vokes in the murder melodrama A Dead Secret. This also brought his first West End reviews.

Lowe first appeared on television in 1951, in an episode of the BBC series I Made News. He would work in television every year afterwards, until his death. 1950s roles included various minor parts in dramas, including the crime series Murder Bag. He played the role of the gunsmith in Leave It to Todhunter (1958), appeared in the comedy series Time Out for Peggy, and played a fussy, nervous character in an episode of Dial 999. His first regular television part was as ship steward Sydney Barker in the ABC-TV series All Aboard (1958–1959).

In 1960 Lowe took up a regular role as draper and lay preacher Leonard Swindley in the northern soap opera Coronation Street, in which he appeared until 1965. He negotiated a contract through which he only had to work six months of the year, three months on and three months off. During the months he was not playing Swindley, he remained busy on stage or making one-off guest appearances in other TV series such as Z-Cars (1962) and The Avengers (1967) (episode entitled "Dead Man's Treasure"). His most acclaimed stage roles during this period included pompous north-country alderman Michael Oglethorpe in Henry Livings's Stop It, Whoever You Are at the Arts Theatre (1961), and Sir Davey Dunce in The Soldier's Fortune at the Royal Court Theatre (1966).

Lowe did not relish work on Coronation Street and was happy to give it up, but viewer responses to his character led to him reprising Swindley for starring roles in the spin-off series Pardon the Expression (1966) and its sequel Turn Out the Lights (1967).

=== Stardom ===
In 1968, Lowe was cast in his best remembered role, as Home Guard platoon leader Captain Mainwaring in the BBC sitcom Dad's Army (1968–1977). Some colleagues on the show later remarked that the role resembled him: pompous and bumbling. Frank Williams said he felt this perception was unfair: "He certainly didn't suffer fools gladly and always knew his own mind, but he also had an ability to laugh at himself. Personally, I found him to be a most kind and generous man". David Croft said Lowe had to be treated with kid gloves. He had firm ideas on what he was willing to do and never took his script home, which resulted in uncertainty over his lines. He could be pompous and over time his part was written so there was a blurring of the line between actor and character. An oddity of his contract was that he would never have to remove his trousers.

Lowe held conservative political views and disapproved of the left-wing politics of his co-star Clive Dunn. Dunn, in turn, described some of Lowe's opinions as outrageous, but as an actor rated him "ten out of ten in his field". Despite some tensions, Jimmy Perry described the cast as a "marvellous bunch of pros" with "no sort of volatile animosity between anybody". He rarely made public political statements, but his face appeared on posters and other advertising in support of the "Voting Yes" campaign for the 1975 United Kingdom European Communities membership referendum. He also appeared at a Conservative Party fundraiser in Edward Heath's constituency.

Lowe also played Mainwaring in a radio version of Dad's Army, a stage play and a feature-length film released in 1971. He played Mainwaring's drunken brother Barry Mainwaring, in the series' 1975 Christmas episode "My Brother and I".

While Dad's Army was not in production, Lowe's work continued to include stage roles. In 1968, he was invited by Sir Laurence Olivier to join the National Theatre at the Old Vic, to play divorce solicitor A.B. Raham in Somerset Maugham's Home and Beauty. He returned to the company in 1974 to play Stephano in Peter Hall's production of The Tempest, starring Sir John Gielgud. In the same year he appeared as Ben Jonson alongside Gielgud's Shakespeare in Edward Bond's Bingo at the Royal Court Theatre.

Lowe also had prominent parts in several films directed by Lindsay Anderson, including if.... (1968) and O Lucky Man! (1973), for which he won a BAFTA for Best Actor in a Supporting Role. His other film parts during this period included Spike Milligan's surreal The Bed Sitting Room (1969), in which he mutates into a parrot. He played a drunken butler in The Ruling Class (1972) with Peter O'Toole, and theatre critic Horace Sprout in the horror film Theatre of Blood (1973), in which the character is murdered by a deranged actor played by Vincent Price.

On television, Lowe appeared twice as a guest performer on The Morecambe and Wise Show (1971 and 1977), alongside Richard Briers in a series of Ben Travers farces for the BBC, as the pompous Dr Maxwell in the ITV comedy Doctor at Large (1971) and as Redvers Bodkin, a snooty, old-fashioned butler, in the short-lived sitcom The Last of the Baskets (1971–72). Between 1971 and 1973 Lowe joined Dad's Army colleague Ian Lavender, on the BBC radio comedy Parsley Sidings and he played Mr Micawber in a BBC television serial of David Copperfield (1974). He employed a multitude of voices on the BBC animated television series Mr. Men (1974), in which he was the narrator.

In 1972, Lowe also recorded the novelty songs "How I Won The War" and "My Little Girl, My Little Boy".

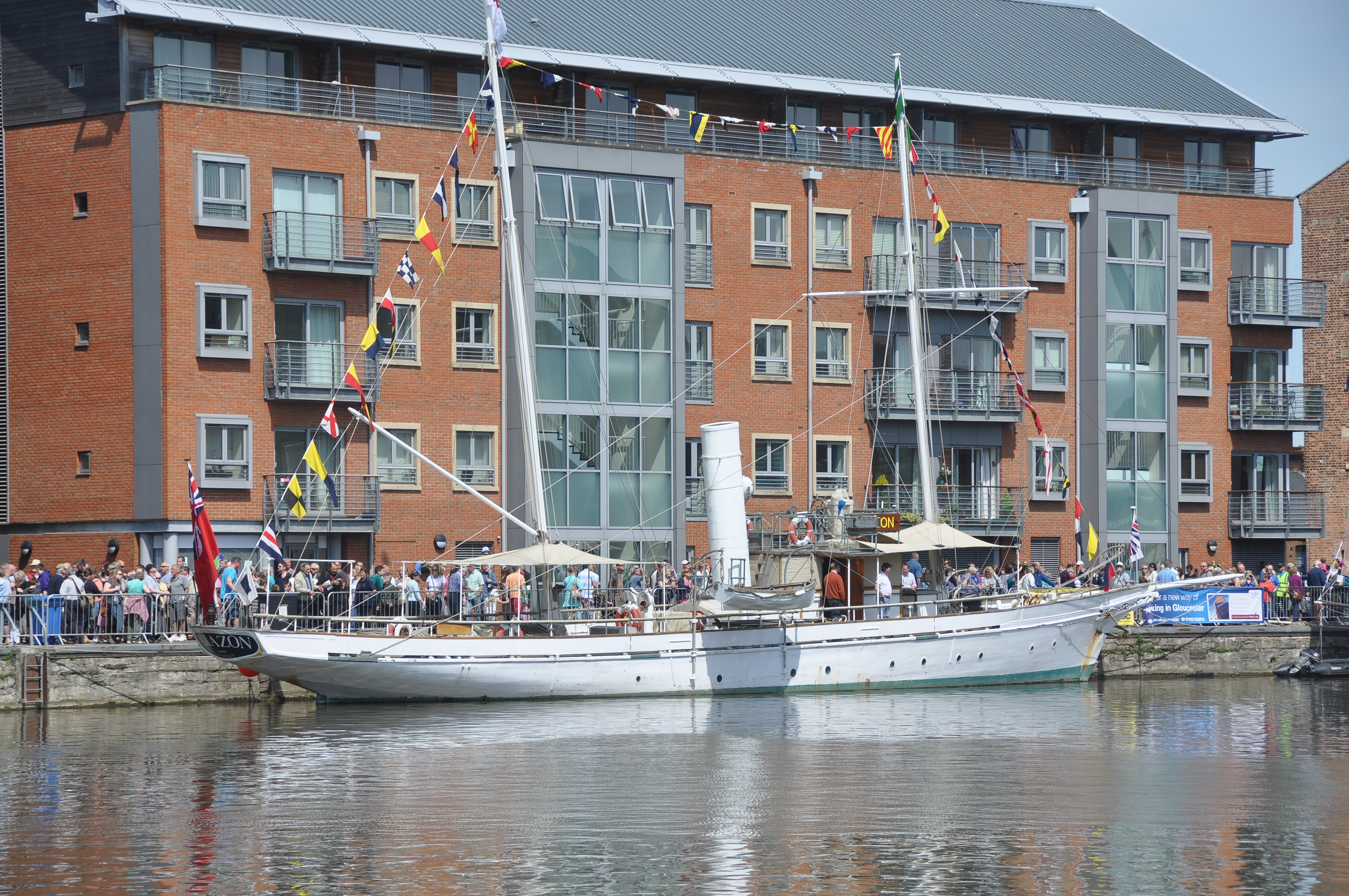
Amazon in 2013

While touring at coastal theatres with his wife, Lowe used his 1885 former steam yacht Amazon as a floating base. He bought Amazon as a houseboat in 1968, but realised her potential and took her back to sea in 1971; this vessel is still operating in the Mediterranean. The ship had a bar with a semicircular notch cut halfway along, to enable both the portly figure of Lowe and his wife to serve behind the bar at the same time, acting as hosts during the parties they threw on board.

In an interview for a Dad's Army retrospective on BBC television in 2010, Clive Dunn described him sitting at the bar in the evenings when they were filming on location, consuming a drink which Lowe named 'Amazon' after his yacht. Dunn described the drink as comprising "gin and ginger ale, with a single slice of cucumber".

=== Declining health and later career ===
By the mid-1970s Lowe suffered from narcolepsy, which caused him to fall asleep during rehearsals, performances, and at other unintended times – sometimes in the middle of a sentence. Stephen Lowe said that although he was often mistaken for drunk, he very rarely was. While both biographies of Lowe acknowledge his high consumption of alcohol, neither claim it extended to alcoholism. Lowe was also unfit, a smoker, and increasingly overweight. In 1979, he suffered a mild stroke. Despite his generally declining health, including worsening narcolepsy, he maintained a busy professional life; Derek Benfield described him as a workaholic.

When Dad's Army ended in 1977, Lowe remained in demand, appearing as Mr Gooch opposite Joan Plowright in Daphne Laureola, one of the filmed plays in the Laurence Olivier Presents series from Granada, taking starring roles in television comedies such as Bless Me, Father (1978–1981), as the mischievous Catholic priest Father Charles Clement Duddleswell and in Potter (1979–80) as the busybody Redvers Potter. In 1980 he toured Australia and New Zealand with a production of Derek Benfield's play Beyond a Joke. Around this time Lowe was making many television commercials, with no fewer than nineteen in 1981 alone.

His later stage career mainly involved touring the English provinces with his wife. He seldom took on a stage play unless it included a role for Joan and this saw some opportunities fall through. Lowe's agent Peter Campbell said the last ten years of his theatre career were "blown" by this condition, and Stephen Lowe thought his mother placed unreasonable pressure on his father to find her roles. Frank Williams said the couple shared a great love story, and if the arrangement held Lowe back it was only because he chose to be held back. Ian Lavender thought Lowe's narcolepsy led him to pull back from his range and choose safer roles.

In 1981 Lowe reprised his role as Captain Mainwaring for the pilot episode of It Sticks Out Half a Mile, a radio sequel to Dad's Army. At Christmas that year he and Joan appeared in the pantomime Mother Goose at Victoria Palace, London. In January 1982 three months before his death, Richard Burton had his private aeroplane fly Lowe to Venice to film a cameo role in the television miniseries Wagner.

=== Death and last released works ===
On 14 April 1982, Lowe gave a live televised interview on Pebble Mill at One. At just after 6 pm the same day, he collapsed from the onset of a stroke in his dressing room at the Alexandra Theatre, Birmingham. This was before a performance of Home at Seven in which he was due to appear with his wife, Joan. He was taken, unconscious, to Birmingham General Hospital, where he died at about 5 am, at the age of 66.

Lowe was cremated and his ashes were scattered at Sutton Coldfield Crematorium, following a small funeral of which few people were notified and fewer than a dozen attended. Joan did not attend, as she refused to miss a performance of Home at Seven and was appearing in Belfast at the time. According to her friend Phyllis Bateman, the couple had a pact that neither would go to the other's funeral. Stephen said his parents were not sentimental or religious and Joan's coping mechanism was summed up in the adage, "the show must go on". A memorial service was held on 24 May 1982 at St Martin-in-the-Fields, attended by Lowe's wife and family, former colleagues and many friends.

Lowe's final film and television performances premiered after his death. His last feature film was Lindsay Anderson's Britannia Hospital (1982). In his final sitcom, A.J. Wentworth, B.A. (1982), he starred as a boys' preparatory school master. Wagner was Lowe's last screen role, released in December 1983.

== Recognition ==
Tom Cole wrote in the Radio Times: "There are few actors who charmed viewers both young and old with such ease, and fewer still who could be trusted with the task of bringing classic literary characters like Charles Pooter and A.J. Wentworth to life." Graham Lord wrote, in his 2002 biography, that "almost every actor who worked with Arthur considered him to be outstanding". He gave as an exception Martin Benson, who said Lowe did not have a lot of vocal skill in his rep days, "and I don't think he had afterwards either...A lot of his success came from this oddball personality that he had and the fact that later in his career he had some very good writers."

In 2002, Paul Scofield described Lowe as a rare talent and "seriously brilliant actor", and said it was his timing that set him apart. Jimmy Perry agreed about his timing: "It was faultless. He could get huge laughs with such simple lines as 'Just a moment,' 'how dare you,' and 'you stupid boy'" – all catchphrases from Dad's Army. Perry also described Lowe as a kind man who went out of his way to help actors less fortunate than himself.

== Approach to acting ==
In the 1970s, Lowe said he had "simply wanted to be the best character actor going" and it was only television that brought him stardom. Of his preferred style of comic acting he said: "Anybody could get a laugh if they pissed into the pit. But it wouldn't be the right laugh." He claimed to treat every comic part as a straight part, saying: "The more seriously you play the part, the funnier it is. You see, people are only funny to other people, never to themselves."

== Biographies ==
Two biographies of Arthur Lowe have been published: Arthur Lowe – Dad's Memory by his son Stephen, in 1997; and Arthur Lowe by Graham Lord in 2002. In 2000, The Unforgettable Arthur Lowe was part of The Unforgettable series of TV biographies of comedy performers.

== Memorials ==
In December 2007 plans were announced for a statue of Lowe to be erected in Thetford, Norfolk, where the outside scenes for Dad's Army were filmed. Series co-writer David Croft unveiled the statue on 19 June 2010. It depicts Lowe in the character of Captain Mainwaring, sitting upright on a simple bench in Home Guard uniform, with his swagger stick across his knees.

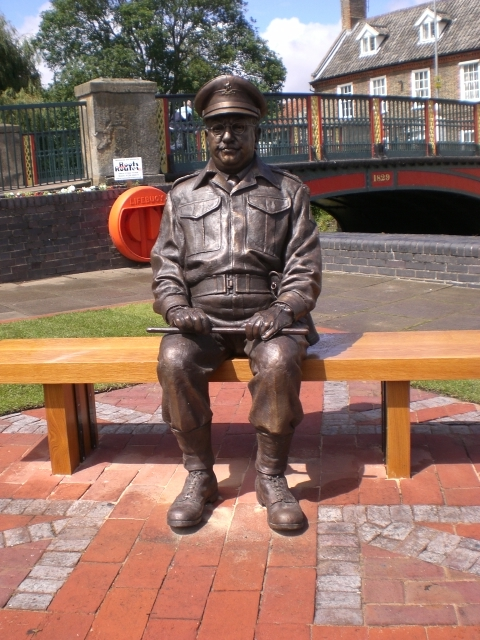
Statue of Captain Mainwaring, Arthur Lowe's Dad's Army character, in Thetford

The star has also had two blue plaques unveiled, one at Maida Vale and one at his birthplace in Hayfield, Derbyshire.

== Portrayals ==
Robert Daws portrayed Lowe in the BBC Radio 4 drama Dear Arthur, Love John by Roy Smiles, first broadcast in 2012. The play charts the relationship between Lowe and John Le Mesurier. John Sessions played him in the 2015 television movie We're Doomed! The Dad's Army Story.

The character of Edward Lowe in the book series The Lowe and Le Breton Mysteries by Stuart Douglas is based on Arthur Lowe at the time he was making Dad's Army.

== Filmography ==
=== Television ===
Year	Title	Role	Notes
1958	Murder Bag		2 episodes
1958	Time Out for Peggy		
1958	Leave It to Todhunter	Gunsmith	2 episodes
1958-1963	ITV Television Playhouse	Various	4 episodes
1958-1964	ITV Play of the Week	Various	4 episodes
1959	All Aboard	Sydney Barker	26 episodes
1959	Dial 999	Samuel Finch (uncredited)	Episode: "The Mechanical Watchman"
1960–65	Coronation Street	Leonard Swindley	197 episodes
1965–66	Pardon the Expression	Leonard Swindley	37 episodes
1967	Turn Out the Lights	Leonard Swindley	6 episodes
1967	The Avengers	Sir George Benstead	Episode: "Dead Man's Treasure"
1968–77	Dad's Army	Captain Mainwaring	80 episodes
1968	The Wednesday Play	Colonel Harrup	Episode: "A Night with Mrs. Da Tanka"
1969	ITV Playhouse	Mr. Cakebread	Episode: "The Wicked Stage"
1970	The Great Inimitable Mr. Dickens	John Dickens	TV film
1970	Jackanory	Storyteller	Episode: "The Emperor's Oblong Pancake"
1970	Rookery Nook	Harold Twine	
1970	Turkey Time	Edwin Stoatt	
1971	Doctor at Large	Dr Maxwell	5 episodes
1971–72	The Last of the Baskets	Redvers Bodkin	13 episodes
1972	It's Murder, But Is It Art?	Phineas Drake	
1974	Microbes and Men	Louis Pasteur	3 episodes
1974–75	David Copperfield	Wilkins Micawber	5 episodes
1974–76	Mr Men	Narrator and character voices	28 episodes
1975	Churchill's People	Epillicus, the butler	Episode: "The Lost Island"
1977	The Galton & Simpson Playhouse	Henry Duckworth	Episode: "Car Along the Pass"
1977	The Morecambe & Wise Show	Captain Mainwaring	Christmas Special
1978–81	Bless Me, Father	Father Charles Clement Duddleswell	21 episodes
1979	The Plank	Smaller workman	TV film
1979–80	Potter	Redvers Potter	13 episodes
1982	A.J. Wentworth, BA	Arthur James Wentworth, B.A.	6 episodes; broadcast posthumously
1983	Wagner	Meser	2 episodes; broadcast posthumously

=== Films ===
Year	Title	Role	Notes
1948	London Belongs to Me	Commuter on Train	Uncredited
1949	Floodtide	Pianist	Uncredited
1949	Stop Press Girl	Archibald	Uncredited
1949	Kind Hearts and Coronets	The Reporter	
1949	Poet's Pub	Coach Guide	Uncredited
1949	The Spider and the Fly	Town Clerk	
1949	Cage of Gold	Short Man	Uncredited
1949	Gilbert Harding Speaking of Murder	3rd Drama critic	
1954	Final Appointment	Mr. Barrett	
1955	Reluctant Bride	Mr. Fogarty	
1955	The Woman for Joe	George's Agent	Uncredited
1955	One Way Out	Sam	
1955	Murder Anonymous	Fingerprint Expert	Uncredited
1955	Windfall		Uncredited
1956	Who Done It?	Bit Part	Uncredited
1956	Breakaway	Mitchell	
1956	The Green Man	Radio Salesman	
1956	High Terrace		Uncredited
1957	Hour of Decision	Calligraphy Expert	
1957	Stranger in Town	Jeweller	
1958	Blind Spot	Garage Mechanic	Uncredited
1958	Stormy Crossing	Garage Owner	
1959	The Boy and the Bridge	Bridge Mechanic	
1960	The Day They Robbed the Bank of England	Bank Official	Uncredited
1960	Follow That Horse	Auctioneer	Uncredited
1962	Go to Blazes	Warder	
1963	This Sporting Life	Charles Slomer	
1965	You Must Be Joking!	Husband	
1967	The White Bus	Mayor	
1968	If....	Mr. Kemp: Staff	
1969	It All Goes to Show	Councillor Henry Parker	Short
1969	The Bed Sitting Room	Father	
1970	Spring and Port Wine	Mr. Aspinall	
1970	Some Will, Some Won't	Police Sergeant	
1970	The Great Inimitable Mr. Dickens	John Dickens	
1970	Fragment of Fear	Mr. Nugent	
1970	The Rise and Rise of Michael Rimmer	Ferret	
1971	A Hole Lot of Trouble	Whitehouse	
1971	Dad's Army	Captain Mainwaring	
1972	The Ruling Class	Daniel Tucker	
1972	Adolf Hitler – My Part in His Downfall	Major Drysdale	
1973	Theatre of Blood	Horace Sprout	
1973	O Lucky Man!	Mr. Duff / Charlie Johnson / Dr. Munda	
1973	No Sex Please, We're British	Mr. Bromley	
1974	Man About the House	Spiros	
1976	The Bawdy Adventures of Tom Jones	Dr. Thwackum	
1977	The Strange Case of the End of Civilization as We Know It	Dr. William Watson, M.D.	
1979	The Lady Vanishes	Charters	
1980	Sweet William	Captain Walton	
1982	Britannia Hospital	Guest Patient	

=== Radio ===
Year	Title	Role	Notes
1971–73	Parsley Sidings	Horace Hepplewhite	21 episodes
1974–76	Dad's Army	Captain Mainwaring	67 episodes
1981	It Sticks Out Half a Mile	Captain Mainwaring	1 episode

== Discography ==
- 'Vocal Gems from Call Me Madam', (1952), (78rpm), Columbia Records D.B. 3067
- Bless 'em All (1969). LP, World Record Club (ST108). Performed with the Richmond Orchestra and Chorus under Malcolm Lockyer. Produced by Bob Barrett. Songs: "Who Do You Think You Are Kidding, Mr Hitler?", "This is the Army Mr Jones", "Kiss Me Goodnight, Sergeant Major", "I'll Be Seeing You", "Lili Marlene", "Mairzy Doats and Dozy Doats", "The Army, the Navy and the Air Force", "Bless 'em All", "Run, Rabbit, Run!", "(We're Gonna Hang Out) The Washing on the Siegfried Line", "That Lovely Weekend", "Underneath the Arches", "Alouette", "Waltzing Matilda" and "Now is the Hour".
- Home Town (1975). 45 rpm, Warner Bros. Records (K16670). B side to "A Nightingale Sang in Berkeley Square" performed by John Le Mesurier.
- 'The Mr. Men with Arthur Lowe ', (1976) L.P.: Epic: SEPC 81184

(Re-released 1979 by BBC as 'The Mr. Men Songs', and 'The Mr. Men Songs with Arthur Lowe').

== Awards ==
=== BAFTAs ===
Year	Award	Category	Title	Result
1969	BAFTA TV Awards	Best Actor	Dad's Army	Nominated
1970	BAFTA TV Awards	Best Light Entertainment Performance	Dad's Army	Nominated
1972	BAFTA TV Awards	Best Light Entertainment Performance	Dad's Army	Nominated
1973	BAFTA Film Awards	Best Supporting Actor	O Lucky Man!	Won
1974	BAFTA TV Awards	Best Light Entertainment Performance	Dad's Army	Nominated
1974	BAFTA TV Awards	Best Actor	Microbes and Men and David Copperfield	Nominated
1977	BAFTA TV Awards	Best Light Entertainment Performance	Dad's Army	Nominated

== Bibliography ==
- Hughes, John Graven (1976). The Greasepaint War: Show Business 1939–1945. London: New English Library. ISBN 9780450030642.
- Lord, Graham (2002). Arthur Lowe. London: Orion. ISBN 0-75284-229-3.
- Lowe, Arthur (1980). "Contributor". David Jacob's Book of Celebrities' Jokes & Anecdotes. By Jacobs, David. Robson Books. p. 100. ISBN 0860511251.
- Lowe, Stephen (1997). Arthur Lowe: Dad's Memory. London: Virgin. ISBN 0753501708.
- McCann, Graham (2001). Dad's Army: The story of a classic television show. Fourth Estate. ISBN 978-1-84115-308-7.
