= Melinda Plowman =

American actress

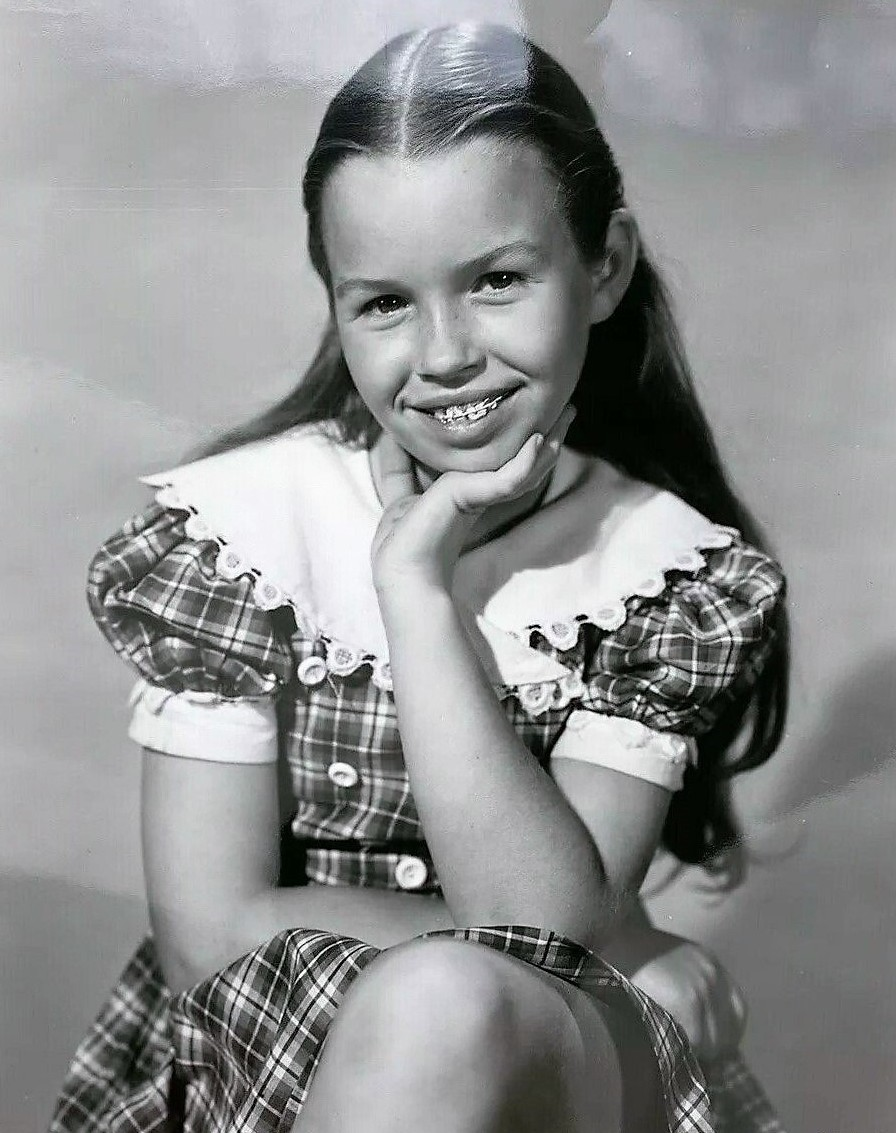
- Plowman in 1951
- Born: Melinda Ann Plowman; May 13, 1941 (age 85); Abilene, Texas, U.S.
- Other names: Melinda Ann Casey; Melinda Casey
- Occupations: Actress, assistant director
- Years active: 1949 − 1996
- Spouses: Philip Casey (1967-1973) (divorced, 1 child); Robert Ballew (1961-1963) (divorced, 1 child)
- Children: 2

Melinda Ann Plowman (born May 13, 1941), also known as Melinda Ann Casey and Melinda Casey, is an American actress and associate director. She began her acting career at age 6 and appeared in feature films and television episodes through the 1960s. In the 1970s, she became a member of the Directors Guild of America and worked as an associate director through the 1990s.

== Early life ==
Melinda Ann Plowman was born on May 13, 1941, in Abilene, Texas. Her parents, Homer Lee Plowman and Lura Frances Slaughter, had met and married in Abilene in 1934. She has one younger sister. Her second birthday party, hosted by her mother and grandmother, was reported in the Abilene Reporter-News.

The family moved to Los Angeles in 1942. Plowman was enrolled in a dance school at age 3. She was "discovered" at the age of 6 through the dancing school and was cast in a bit part in the 1949 film Little Women.

== Career ==
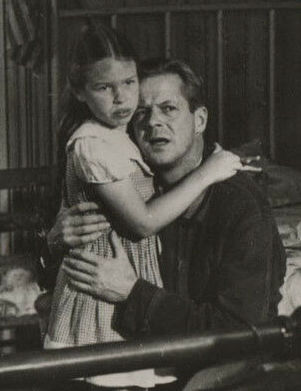
Plowman with Dan Duryea in Chicago Calling (1951)

=== Acting ===
Plowman acted in Hollywood films in the 1950s but primarily worked in television. She appeared in seven NBC Matinee Theater episodes, as well as episodes of Ford Theatre, The Loretta Young Show, and The George Burns and Gracie Allen Show. She was one of the original Mouseketeers on The Mickey Mouse Club. In 1959 she appeared on Wagon Train S3 E10 "The Danny Benedict Story" as Priscilla Walker.

Her parents preferred to maintain her status as a freelance actor rather than a studio contract player. Her mother accompanied her on the set. When she wasn't working, Plowman attended a public elementary school and, later, San Marino High School in San Marino, California. During film shoots, she had a private tutor on the set.

Plowman landed her first leading role at the age of 25 in the 1966 horror film Billy the Kid Versus Dracula.

=== Directing ===
In the 1970s, she joined the Directors Guild of America, listing herself as an associate director under the name Melinda Ann Casey. She continued working on film crews through the 1990s.

== Personal life ==
Plowman married Phil Casey, a talent manager, in Las Vegas in August 1967. They had one son. Plowman later married Robert Ballew, with whom she has a daughter. In 1971, her parents moved back to Fort Worth. She lives in Victoria, British Columbia.

== Filmography (as an actress) ==
Film
| Year | Title | Role | Notes |
|---|---|---|---|
| 1949 | Little Women | Girl | Uncredited |
| 1949 | Holiday Affair | Girl | |
| 1949 | Ma and Pa Kettle | Susie Kettle | |
| 1950 | Three Came Home | English girl | |
| 1950 | My Blue Heaven | Pringle girl | |
| 1950 | Again Pioneers | Rebecca Ashby | As Malinda Plowman |
| 1951 | Home Town Story | Katie Washburn | |
| 1951 | Chicago Calling | Nancy Cannon | |
| 1952 | Monkey Business | Little girl | |
| 1952 | Carrie | Little girl | |
| 1953 | Pack Train | Judy | |
| 1956 | Wiretapper | | |
| 1957 | The Green-Eyed Blonde | Betsy Abel | As Linda Plowman |
| 1966 | Billy the Kid Versus Dracula | Betty Bentley | |
| 1976 | Street Girls | Adelle | As Linda Reynolds |
| 1982 | Wrong Is Right | W.T.N. news staffer | As Melinda Ann Casey |

TV
| Year | Title | Role | Episode |
|---|---|---|---|
| 1950 | Big Town | Kathy | |
| 1950 | The Gene Autry Show | Betsy Simmons | |
| 1950 | The Cisco Kid | Carol Cartright | |
| 1952 | The Adventures of Ozzie and Harriet | Girl, Linda, Melinda, Sean's girl, Sue Bailey | 5 episodes |
| 1952 | Ford Television Theatre | Little girl | |
| 1952 | Cavalcade of America | Vi as a teenager | |
| 1953 | The Danny Thomas Show | Mary Lou | |
| 1953 | General Electric Theater | Charlotte Dunn | |
| 1954 | Rocky Jones, Space Ranger | Jonica | |
| 1954 | Annie Oakley | Jill Turner, Penny | 2 episodes |
| 1955 | The Adventures of Champion | Sally Custer | Episode: "Salted Ground" |
| 1955 | The Adventures of Champion | Lorna | Episode: "Canyon of Wanted Men" |
| 1955 | Science Fiction Theatre | Alice | |
| 1956 | The Mickey Mouse Club | Peggy | |
| 1956 | Diamond Mystery Theater | Susan Davis | Episode: "The Man Across the Street" |
| 1958 | The Donna Reed Show | Babs | Episode: "Parting of the Ways" |
| 1958 | Wanted: Dead or Alive | Patience Fairweather | Season 3, Episode 22 "Detour" |
| 1959 | The June Allyson Show | Nancy | 1 episode |
| 1959 | Bonanza | Heather Lowell | 1 episode |
| 1959 | The Many Loves of Dobie Gillis | Central High Girl | |
| 1960 | My Three Sons | Julie | Season 6, episode: "the wrong Robbie" |
| 1960 | National Velvet | Sally Grimes | |
| 1961 | The Americans | Molly | 1 episode |
| 1961 | Bachelor Father | Agnes | 1 episode |
| 1962 | Wagon Train | Penelope | Episode: "Path of the Serpent" |
| 1962 | Perry Mason | Maureen Thomas | Episode: "The Case of the Polka-Dot Pony" |
| 1962 | Going My Way | Jane Everett | |
| 1963 | The Fugitive | Ellen Tolan | Episode: "See Hollywood and Die" |
| 1963 | The Virginian | | Episode: "A Time Remembered" |
| 1963 | My Favorite Martian | Sally | |
| 1963 | Petticoat Junction | Mary Jane Burris | |
| 1964 | The Outer Limits | Vivia Hayden | Episode: "Don't Open Till Doomsday" |
| 1964 | Gomer Pyle, U.S.M.C. | Girl Marine | |
| 1965 | Please Don't Eat the Daisies | Terry, Secretary | 2 episodes |
| 1966 | The Felony Squad | Mylene Bruce, Suellen Taubs | 2 episodes |
| 1966 | Bonanza | | Episode: "Four Sisters from Boston" |
| 1967 | Judd, for the Defense | Girl | |
| 1969–1971 | Hot Wheels (TV series) | Janet Martin | Voice |
| 1969–1971 | Skyhawks | Cynthia Hughes | Voice |

== Sources ==
- Boggs, Johnny D. (2013). Billy the Kid on Film, 1911-2012. McFarland. ISBN 9781476603353.
- Bowles, Jerry G. (1976). Forever Hold Your Banner High!: The Story of the Mickey Mouse Club and what Happened to the Mouseketeers. Doubleday. ISBN 9780385116220.
- Terrace, Vincent (2014). Encyclopedia of Television Shows, 1925 through 2010 (2nd ed.). McFarland. ISBN 9780786486410.
- Woolery, George W. (1985). Children's Television, Part II: The First Thirty-five Years, 1946-1981. Scarecrow Press. ISBN 9780810816510.
