= Toni Beaulieu =

American composer (1905–1994)

Leone Florence Perry (8 May 1905 – 28 March 1994), known professionally as Toni Beaulieu, was an American composer of classical, semi-classical, and popular music. She later used the names Leone Perry Hall and Leone Perry Allen.

In 1946, Beaulieu founded Artistic Records, which recorded some of the leading pop artists. Her name appears in the Internet Movie Database as a contributor to movie soundtracks.

Her music is being published by Clear Note Publications. The first volume, Celestial Suite, is now available. One movement of the suite plus five other short pieces may be heard on the Mojave Beach podcast site.

== Biography ==
Born in Highmore, South Dakota, on May 8, 1905, Leone Florence Perry began piano lessons at age six and violin lessons at age eight. She began playing the violin in public concerts and was considered a child prodigy. At age 14, she began studying in the Academy Department at Huron College in Huron, North Dakota. She graduated from the academy in 1920 and enrolled in the MacPhail School of Music in Minneapolis. She graduated from MacPhail with a Bachelor of Music degree in June 1924, then joined the MacPhail faculty teaching piano and violin.

Leone had a short, unsuccessful marriage to bandleader Dick Hall. Then, in the early 1930s, she married Jack Allen, the owner of a Minneapolis music store. The Allens moved to Los Angeles and Leone continued teaching. Their son, Jack Allen Jr., was born there. The Allens divorced in the early 1960s.

In Los Angeles in the 1940s, Leone Perry Allen adopted the name Toni Beaulieu and began composing in earnest. She joined Broadcast Music Inc. (BMI) and found a publisher, the BMI-affiliated Duchess Music Corporation.

She was a composer. For almost 50 years, from 1942 to 1988, she wrote classical music, blues, jazz, and rags, also love songs, hymns, and children's songs. Latin-American music enjoyed great popularity, so, although Toni's background was English/Welsh/Scottish, she began writing Latin music—rhumbas, boleros, and the like, with Cuban, Puerto Rican, and generally Ibero-American origins.

In 1946, she formed her own record company, Artistic Records, to produce commercial recordings of her compositions. Her first release was the album Caribbean Moon, three ten-inch 78-rpm shellac discs, three minutes per side, containing Caribbean Moon (bolero), When You Look at Me (bolero), Bahama Bay (rumba), La Tortolita (samba), Cuban Bolero, and Gypsy Rhapsody (beguine). Performers were leading artists, including the Puerta Rican flutist Esy Morales (1916–1950), pianist Geri Galian (1918–2001), and singers Nestor Amaral (1913–1962) and Nick Cea. The reviewer for The Billboard found the album "ear-worthy" and noted that "Miss Beaulieu proves herself as a capable tunesmith. She displays a well-grounded knowledge of Latin modal scales with which builds her appealing melodies."

In 1947, she released a single of Jungle Rhumba / Rumba Jungla, probably her best known work. The B side was Chopin’s Fantasie-Impromptu, op. 66, set to a rhumba rhythm. Performers were Geri Galian and His Caribbean Rhythm Boys—a string bass player and three percussionists. Jungle Rhumba was orchestrated and used in a production number in the movie Neptune’s Daughter (1949); Xavier Cugat conducts the orchestra. The scene was included in the documentary feature film That’s Entertainment! III (1994).

"Jungle Rhumba" became a Latin standard. The estimated 35 different recorded arrangements include those by Dante and His Magical Orchestra, by Freddy Martin and His Orchestra, and—the composer's favorite—by piano duo Ferrante & Teicher and their orchestra.

The music business was particularly difficult for women during that time, however, and during the 1950s she shifted her musical focus to non-commercial genres.

== Selected works ==
All works for solo piano unless otherwise designated. (* in Mojave Beach recording)

- Gypsy Rhapsody (1942)
- Bahama Bay (1943)
- Cuban Bolero (1945)
- When You Look at Me (1945)
- La Tortolita (1945)
- Caribbean Moon (1947)
- Jungle Rhumba (1947; orchestra score 1948)
- Autumn Winds 1951 (in Celestial Suite)
- Dawn 1951 (in Celestial Suite)
- Prelude to the Stars 1951 (in Celestial Suite)
- Nocturne to the Clouds (1951)
- Daffodil Hill (1953)
- Midnight on the Riviera (1957)
- Memoria Apasionada for piano and cello
- Whispering Rain *
- Grasshopper Rag * (ca. 1973)
- New Horizons *
- Lamento del Matador * (ca. 1975)
- Mystic Night * (ca. 1975)
- Nocturne to the Clouds *
- Jewels of the Sky (1978, in Celestial Suite)
