= Neil McCallum (actor) =

Canadian actor, screenwriter, and film producer (1929–1976)

- Born: 20 May 1929; Hanley, Saskatchewan, Canada
- Died: 26 April 1976 (aged 46); Thatcham, Berkshire, England
- Education: Guildhall School of Music and Drama
- Occupation: Actor
- Years active: 1950–1976

Neil John McCallum (20 May 1929 – 26 April 1976) was a Canadian actor, screenwriter, and film and television producer, long based in the United Kingdom.

== Early life ==
McCallum was born in Hanley, Saskatchewan in 1929. Prior to his acting career, he worked as a recreational therapist in a mental hospital. In 1949, he moved to England to attend the Guildhall School of Music and Drama.

== Career ==
McCallum's first major appearance on stage was alongside Sam Wanamaker in The Rainmaker in the mid-1950s.

He appeared in British TV series in the 1950s, 1960s and early 1970s, including The Saint, Department S and UFO, and in films such as The Siege of Pinchgut (1959) (playing the brother of Aldo Ray) and Dr. Terror's House of Horrors (1965). He provided the voices of Dr Ray Pierce in the film Thunderbirds Are Go (1966) and an airport controller in the TV series Captain Scarlet and the Mysterons (1967). He played lead character Angelo James in the BBC series Vendetta (1966–68).

In his native country, he appeared on CBC series like Festival, General Motors Theatre, Playdate, and Scarlett Hill.

He was also a scriptwriter (including two 1964 thrillers, Do You Know this Voice? and Walk a Tightrope), producer and occasional director.

== Personal life ==
McCallum dated Julie Andrews early in her career, as mentioned in Andrews' autobiography Home. He married actress Judith Whitaker in 1957, and they had three children together. The couple lived at George's Farm, Crookham Common, near Thatcham in Berkshire.

=== Death ===
Aged 46, McCallum died in Thatcham of a brain hemorrhage on 26 April 1976.

== Filmography ==
=== Film ===
Year	Title	Role	Notes
1957	The Betrayal	German Officer	Uncredited
1958	On the Run	Wesley	
1959	The Siege of Pinchgut	Johnny Kirk	
1959	The Devil's Disciple	Christie Dudgeon	
1959	Jet Storm	Gil Gilbert	
1960	Foxhole in Cairo	Sandy	
1961	Night Without Pity	O'Brien	
1962	The Inspector	Browne	
1962	The Longest Day	Canadian Doctor	Uncredited
1962	The War Lover	Sully	
1964	Walk a Tightrope	Counsel	
1965	Dr. Terror's House of Horrors	Jim Dawson	Segment: "Werewolf"
1965	Catacombs	Dick Corbett	
1966	Thunderbirds Are Go	Dr. Ray Pierce (voice)	
1968	The Lost Continent	First Officer Hemmings	
1969	Moon Zero Two	Space Captain	
1971	Quest for Love	Jimmy	

==== Production credits ====
Year	Title	Notes
1963	The Eyes of Annie Jones	Producer
1964	Walk a Tightrope	Screenwriter
1964	Do You Know This Voice?	Screenwriter
1965	Catacombs	Associate producer

=== Television ===
Year	Title	Role	Notes
1952–57	Sunday Night Theatre	Various roles	3 episodes
1953	Wednesday Theatre	Sangster/Shorty	Episode: "Mac and the Atom"
1953	The Thief, the Gang and Jeremiah	Sailor	TV film
1954	The Wide, Wide World	Boston Waiter	Episode: "Ellen Meets Miss Fortune"
1954	Impostor's Gold	Squirt	TV film
1954–60	General Motors Theatre	Various roles	7 episodes
1955	Scope	Guildenstern	Episode: "Hamlet"
1955	Playbill	Angelino	Episode: "Angelino"
1955	London Playhouse	Newsreel Cameraman	Episode: "The Man Who Liked Christmas"
1956	Space School	Sam Scroop	4 episodes
1957	Shadow Squad	Link White	2 episodes
1957–60	ITV Television Playhouse	Various roles	3 episodes
1957–60	The Vise	Pete Paulson	24 episodes
1957–61	Armchair Theatre	Various roles	11 episodes
1957–61	Play of the Week	Various roles	5 episodes
1960	International Detective	Chet Lawton	Episode: "The Prescott Case"
1960	The Four Just Men	Nelson	Episode: "Riot"
1960	Armchair Mystery Theatre	Fred Collins	Episode: "False Witness"
1960	Here Lies Miss Sabry	Tom Horbin	2 episodes
1961	No Hiding Place	Castello	Episode: "Nina and the Night People"
1961	Sir Francis Drake	Sir Martin	Episode: "The Flame-Thrower"
1961–66	Festival	Various roles	6 episodes
1962	Quest	Piotr	Episode: "The Eighth Day of the Week"
1962	BBC Sunday-Night Play	Stephen Moriarty	Episode: "Libel on a Liar"
1962–64	Playdate	Various roles	7 episodes
1963	Moonstrike	Alain	Episode: "The Expert"
1963	Maigret	Dr. Negrel	Episode: "Maigret's Little Joke"
1963	Scarlett Hill	George Robbins	Episode: "Twice Wedded, Twice Blessed"
1963, 1964	The Saint	Nick Vashetti, Ed Jopley	2 episodes
1964	Espionage	Bill Martin	Episode: "Castles in Spain"
1965	Thursday Theatre	Dan Hughes	Episode: "The Kidders"
1965	Dr. Finlay's Casebook	Kevin McDonald	Episode: "The Champion"
1965, 1966	Court Martial	Cpt. Anthony Merrill, Ben Harker	2 episodes
1965, 1970	Thirty-Minute Theatre	Mr. Bixby, Donald	2 episodes
1966–68	Vendetta	Angelo James	22 episodes
1966, 1969	The Troubleshooters	Ray Kennedy, Jean Paul	2 episodes
1967–68	Captain Scarlet and the Mysterons	Additional voices	4 episodes
1968	The Jazz Age	Dan	Episode: "Broadway"
1969	The Borderers	Adam Lisle	Episode: "Truce"
1969	The Expert	Cooper	3 episodes
1969	Department S	Eddie Curtis	Episode: "Handicap Dead"
1969	Hadleigh	George Wenner	2 episodes
1970	Randall and Hopkirk (Deceased)	Rev. Henry Crackan	Episode: "It's Supposed to Be Thicker Than Water"
1970	Softly, Softly: Task Force	Mick Harrigan	Episode: "Never Hit a Lady"
1970	UFO	Carl Mason	Episode: "Court Martial"
1971	Saturday Night Theatre	Charlie	Episode: "A Windmill in the Willows"
1971	Play for Today	Blake	Episode: "Traitor"
1972	Spy Trap	Donald Barry	4 episodes
1972	Jason King	Sam Finnigin	Episode: "Every Picture Tells a Story"
1972	The Protectors	Bennett	Episode: "One and One Makes One"
1972	The Mad Trapper	Eames	TV film

== Stage credits ==
Year	Title	Role	Venue
1951-52	The Importance of Wearing Clothes	Various	Bolton's Theatre Club
1952	Abraham Lincoln		Birmingham Repertory Theatre
1952-53	The Man	Doug	UK tour
1956	The Rainmaker	Jim Curry	UK tour
1959	The Buskers	Nicholas	Arts Theatre
1961	The Man Who Played God	Howard	Pembroke Theatre, Croydon
1962	Period of Adjustment	George Haverstick	Wyndham's Theatre
1962	Period of Adjustment	George Haverstick	Royal Court Theatre
1963	Monique	Ravinel	UK tour
1964	In White America		Arts Theatre
1970	Meet Mr. Callaghan	Slim Callaghan	UK tour
