= The Black Angel (novel) =

1943 novel by Cornell Woolrich

First edition (publ. Doubleday, Doran)

The Black Angel is a 1943 novel by Cornell Woolrich, which was based on two of his own short stories, "Murder in Wax" and "Face Work" (later reissued under the title "Angel Face"). Woolrich had reworked many of his short stories into full-length novels.

== "Murder in Wax" ==
"Murder in Wax" was first published in the pulp magazine Dime Detective in March 1935, a short story in which a man's mistress is murdered, right before he is about to leave his wife for her. After he is arrested and sentenced to death, the story is narrated by the condemned man's wife as she searches for the killer. The twist in this story is that after she seemingly cornered the murderer, she is revealed to be the killer.

== "Face Work" / "Angel Face" ==
Two years later, Woolrich reworked this story again in "Face Work," published in Black Mask in October 1937, although the story was later reissued under the title "Angel Face." The characters were changed from husband and wife to brother and sister. The sister, Jerry Wheeler, is a New York stripper who tries to save her younger brother from being executed after he is found guilty of killing singer Ruby Rose. To achieve this, Wheeler has to insinuate herself into the life and affections of a sadistic nightclub owner.

Jerry Wheeler, 27, has been dancing in nightclubs to support herself and her brother ever since she was 16. Now, when she learns that Chick is ready to desert kindly Mary Allen and run off with a gold-digging floozy, her motherly instincts are aroused and she becomes aggressively protective. She visits Ruby Rose Reading, but can't convince her or Chick to sever the relationship. Later that night, Ruby is found dead and police arrest Chick as the prime suspect. At the trial, the testimonies from Ruby's maid Mandy Leroy and the doorman Charlie Baker seal Chick's conviction. The lawyer's fees force Jerry to move to a cheaper apartment, a seedy dive she has rented under her old stage name, Honey Sebastian. Detective Nick Burns volunteers to help her find evidence that can reopen the trial and exonerate Chick. He calls her Angel Face, a term of endearment that indicates his romantic attraction to her.

Jerry comes across Ruby's jewelry case, and inside the box she discovers a secret compartment containing a letter written by notorious gangster Milton Militis in which he threatens Ruby for cheating on him. To wangle her way closer to Militis, Jerry auditions at one of his nightclubs, Hell's Bells. After several weeks of working there, she lures Militis out of town with a bogus telegram, and breaks into his apartment to search for concrete evidence. Militis returns too soon, and thinks she has finally consented to being his girl; however one of his henchmen, Rocco, exposes Jerry's identity.

Jerry is captured by Militis and taken to his home on Long Island. At his house, Militis performs his branding ritual on Jerry. He brags aloud about killing her the same way he killed Ruby. Suddenly, Nick bursts through the door with an army of police, and he shoots Militis. The police had trailed Militis to his Long Island home and raided it in time to hear his confession. Nick says that with this information and the brand on Jerry's hip in the same place as it was on Ruby Rose, they can prove Chick's innocence.

In 1937, Columbia purchased the rights to "Face Work" and released it as Convicted in 1938, a low-budget crime film which starred Rita Hayworth and Charles Quigley. It was the first screen adaptation of Woolrich's pulp/suspense stories. Twelve years later, it was aired as "Angel Face" on radio's famous Suspense series (May 18, 1950) with Claire Trevor as the good-hearted stripper who tries to save her brother from being convicted of a murder.

== "The Dames" ==
In Laura Lippman’s introduction to "The Dames" in Otto Penzler’s The Black Lizard Big Book of Pulps, she writes that even though "the pulps of the early-twentieth century will never be mistaken for proto-feminist documents… there is just enough kink in these archetypes of girlfriend/hussy/sociopath to hint at broader possibilities for the female of the species." Taking into account of a number of notable dames in pulps by Dashiell Hammett, Raymond Chandler, and Randolph Barr, Lippman argues "the most dynamic female in these stories is the avenging angel in Cornell Woolrich’s 'Angel Face.' Although she requires a timely rescue in the end, her resourcefulness and bravery are beyond question. For the love of her brother, she withstands torture and risks death. But, as she tells us in the story's first paragraph when she refers to her makeup as war pant, she's being quite literal."

I had on my best hat and warpaint when I dug into her bell. You’ve heard make-up called that a thousand times, but this is one time it rated it; it was just that – warpaint.

On the Classic Mystery and Detective homepage, designer and editor Michael E. Grost also points out Woolrich's use of women heroines, especially in "Face Work." Usually these women are in hard-boiled professions and they get into tough situations where they have to protect a naive younger brother or sister. These stories evoke the Depression and a very tough world. These heroines might be hard-boiled, but they are also immensely kind-hearted and resourceful.

== The Black Angel (the novel) ==
Woolrich extended the premise of “Face Work” and “Murder in Wax” in The Black Angel (1943). The novel follows the story of a woman's desperate attempt to prove her husband's innocence after he has been sentenced to death for the murder of his mistress. She tracks down four men in the victim's life, one of whom she suspects may be the real murderer, and systematically destroys them. In the end, her obsession becomes madness and she has ruined her own life along with her victims' lives to save her philandering husband.

Twenty-two-year-old Alberta Murray first suspects her husband of infidelity when he stops calling her by her pet name “Angel Face.” After other evidence confirms her suspicions, she visits her rival, Mia Mercer, and finds her dead amid the material splendor of a luxury apartment. As the prime suspect, her husband is tried and convicted and sentenced to execution in three months.

Motivated by a blind devotion to her husband, Alberta follows up on a couple of clues. For one, she finds two monogrammed matchbooks in Mia's apartment. The one with a double M would be Mia's. The second, with a single M, she discovers lodged in the door seal and realizes that the murderer must have put it there to enable himself to sneak back into her apartment. She uses Mia's telephone book to trace four people whose name starts with M.

Alberta tracks down Marty Blair, Mia's estranged husband, a skid row drunk, and Dr. Mordaunt, both of whom had alibis. She then meets Ladd Mason, who eventually falls in love with her. She suspects him of murdering Mia and sets up a recording console in her apartment, hoping to get his confession on tape. She manages to get his story but the not the one she expected. Mia was planning to blackmail Ladd and his sister Leila, and in anger, Ladd planned to kill Mia but when he arrived at the apartment she was already dead. The fourth name on the list is club owner Jerome J. McKee – he falls in love with her too, and she takes advantage of their intimacy to ransack his safe, hoping to find incriminating evidence for the murder of Mia Mercer. However, McKee's henchman catches her. McKee locks her in her room and she overhears him ordering his men to take her out to Long Island and dispose of her. She has enough time to phone Ladd, who sets up an ambush and rescues her.

Alberta tells Ladd she is married and trying to save Kirk from execution. Ladd lapses into a seizure. He confesses he killed Mia because of her betrayal, and now, because she, too, has betrayed him, he attacks Alberta. They bump against the recording console (that Alberta had placed in the apartment to record Ladd's confession) as he tries to strangle her. Suddenly, he stops. The next thing Alberta realizes is that Ladd is hanging to the window frame from outside the window. The police enter and he falls to his death. Fortunately the recording device was triggered and has recorded Ladd's confession. Kirk is saved.

The story ends with Alberta sleeping with Kirk but dreaming of Ladd. She had found and lost a love greater than the one she has with her husband, a love which, coupled with her reckless ventures into dark, sordid worlds of vice and corruption, has forever tainted her attitude toward life and her feelings for Kirk.

Regarding the Black Angel heroine, Renzi argues that the self-sacrificing Alberta, out to save her wronged yet unfaithful husband, is a true angel. Yet under that pretense of that noble quest, she is, for the four other male suspects, a “black angel.” She ingratiates herself with them before she leads each to his fateful doom. When Alberta achieves her goal and says it was worth it, the consequences suggest otherwise.

In the end, Alberta achieves her goal to free her husband, but it proves to be less than satisfying. Experience has taught her that there are other things more desirable than those few she knew in her previously secure, narrlowly enclosed existence. More than that, she has exposed herself to the filth, corruption, and evil layering the deep, dark recesses of the city. She comes to realize, “… there is such a thing as seeing too much. As seeing too much and too clearly.” The sacrifice turns out to be not the time and effort she expended to free her husband but the loss of her childlike innocence.

== Film adaptation ==
The film adaptation changes a number of story points, drops one character and combines two others. Its plot follows Cathy Bennett, whose husband is convicted of the murder of singer Mavis Marlowe (his mistress), and sets out to find the real killer. Assisted by Marlow's husband, Marty Blair, Cathy follows up the clue of a monogrammed matchbook to nightclub owner Marko. The real killer turns out to be Marty Blair, although he only becomes aware of this late in the film, as the murder was carried out during a drunken binge. This ending differs significantly from Woolrich's short story "Murder in Wax", in which the wife is the killer.

Thomas Renzi asserts that while the film is closely linked to Woolrich's stories (because they share the same central conflict), the screenwriter transformed most of Woolrich's original material into a whole new narrative. Renzi points out a number of dissimilarities that significantly altered the narratives of the original stories. Marty Blair in the film is a composite of Woolrich's Blair and Ladd Mason. Like Blair, Marty becomes a self-pitying skid row alcoholic as a result of his failed marriage and murderous act. This character's demise differs from that of Woolrich's Ladd Mason, who commits suicide. Furthermore, Marty Blair murders his wife (Mavis Marlowe) in an incoherent state of "alcoholic amnesia", unlike Ladd who killed Mia Mercer deliberately while in full control of his faculties. In regards to their relationship with the Black Angel, both Ladd and Blair fall in love with her but are rejected. Ladd reacts by attacking Alberta Murray (the Black Angel in the novel) before committing suicide; Marty, less vengeful, forfeits his reclamation and reverts to his alcoholic benders.

Regarding the Black Angel heroine, Renzi argues that the self-sacrificing Alberta, out to save her wronged yet unfaithful husband, is a true angel. Yet under the pretense of that noble quest, she is, for the four other male suspects, a "black angel". She ingratiates herself with them before she leads each to his doom. When Alberta achieves her goal and says it was worth it, the consequences suggest otherwise. All along, the Black Angel has had misgivings about the effect her experiences have had on her and her quarry.

Cornell Woolrich disliked the film version of his novel. Woolrich saw the film at the urging of Mark Van Doren, a Columbia University professor, and hated it. He wrote to Van Doren in 1947:

I was so ashamed when I came out of there ... it took me two or three days to get over it. All I could keep thinking of in the dark was: Is that what I wasted my whole life at?"
