= Black Angel (1946 film) =

1946 film

- Theatrical release insert poster
- Directed by: Roy William Neill
- Screenplay by: Roy Chanslor
- Based on: the novel The Black Angel by Cornell Woolrich
- Produced by: Roy William Neill; Tom McKnight
- Starring: Dan Duryea; June Vincent; Peter Lorre
- Cinematography: Paul Ivano
- Edited by: Saul A. Goodkind
- Music by: Frank Skinner
- Production company: Universal Pictures
- Distributed by: Universal Pictures
- Release date: August 2, 1946 (United States)
- Running time: 81 minutes
- Country: United States
- Language: English

Black Angel is a 1946 American film noir starring Dan Duryea, June Vincent and Peter Lorre. Directed by Roy William Neill, it was his final feature film. Produced by Universal Pictures, it is set in Los Angeles and broadly adapted from Cornell Woolrich's 1943 novel The Black Angel.

== Plot ==
It is their anniversary, and alcoholic pianist and composer Marty Blair wants to see his ex-wife Mavis Marlowe but she does not want to see him. Not even after she has received the giant ruby brooch he had sent her.

She gives the word to the doorman at her swanky apartment that under no circumstances should Marty be allowed in the building. Marty does try to enter and the doorman gives him the bum's rush. Sulking on the sidewalk, he sees another man, obviously expected, ask to visit her and be welcomed up. Repulsed, enraged and dejected, Marty storms to his corner bar and drowns himself in booze.

Later that evening Kirk Bennett also shows up to visit Mavis. He too is welcomed up by the doorman, only to find Mavis murdered. He hears a prowler in her apartment, searches for them, but they get away. Meanwhile, the new brooch that had been pinned to Mavis' dress disappears.

Seen fleeing the scene, the married Bennett is soon picked up by Captain Flood of the Los Angeles Police Department. He claims Mavis was blackmailing him to conceal their affair, but can offer no proof of someone else being there who would be responsible both for Mavis' death and the theft of her broach. He is convicted of her murder and sentenced to death.

Through it all his wife Catherine has remained steadfast. Now, while Kirk's days on Death Row tick away toward the gas chamber, she mounts her own vigorous but clumsy investigation of his claims of innocence. One of her first leads takes her to Marty, whom she is convinced is the murderer. A mothering friend of his (who looks after him during his alcoholic binges) clears him, as had the police. Marty, it seems, had been locked tight in his own room at the time of the killing.

Attracted to Catherine, he volunteers to help her. When he sees a picture of Kirk he tells her that was not the man he saw whisked in to visit Mavis on the night of the murder. A chance clue leads them to a nightclub, then to its owner, Mr. Marko, whom Marty identifies as the mystery man.

Since Catherine used to sing some, Marty suggests they team up and audition for a spot in Marko's club. They get the job, and become convinced Marko is hiding a dark secret when Marty recognizes an envelope from Mavis' personal stationery in his office. Catherine schemes for a chance to search it in his absence. When she is caught, Captain Flood arrives in time to referee. Marko admits he had been being blackmailed by Mavis over his ex-con background, but the brooch they were sure he had in his safe is not there. He is cleared as a suspect.

Between their detective leg work and cover as a performing duet Catherine and Marty come to spend all their time together, with Marty becoming a welcome daytime visitor to her home. Their partnership blossoms into a songwriting collaboration; that, along with the nightclub act lead to a taste of glamor and celebrity. Marty even stays sober. On the night before Kirk is due to be executed, Marty cannot hold it in any more and declares his love for Catherine. In spite of having "sacrificed her virtue" in getting close enough to Mr. Marko to rifle his safe, she tells Marty that Kirk had always been the only man for her, and would remain so. Devastated, Marty goes on a bender, and in a carousel of bars chances on a dame wearing the missing brooch. When she asks him where he has been since giving it to her, it comes clear that he had pinned it on her himself the night of the murder.

The shock of this discovery triggers a flashback. In his delirium, Marty realizes that it was actually he who had strangled Mavis and taken the brooch, then buried the traumatic memory in a drunken stupor. Paying the usual quarter, he had bribed his building's janitor to let him out of his room that night, and stumbled up the stairs to Mavis' apartment when the doorman was distracted.

He tries to contact Captain Flood to confess in time to save Kirk, but Flood is out on a case. After several failed efforts he leaves a message for Flood to call him at Catherine's home, but is passed out drunk when the phone rings.

Come daylight, Catherine returns from a visit to the prison to say a final goodbye to Kirk. She finds and rouses Marty, who begins to reflexively confess. Flood glides into the room and hears it all. As fantastic as the story is, Marty seems sincere, and willing to accept the consequences. The missing brooch that he clutches in his hand cinches the deal. Flood gets on the phone to reach the governor for a stay of execution. Kirk will be saved. Catherine will go back to her unfaithful man.

== Cast ==
- Dan Duryea as Martin Blair
- June Vincent as Catherine Bennett
- Peter Lorre as Marko
- Broderick Crawford as Captain Flood
- Constance Dowling as Mavis Marlowe
- Wallace Ford as Joe
- Hobart Cavanaugh as Hotel Caretaker
- Freddie Steele as Lucky
- John Phillips as Kirk Bennett
- Ben Bard as Bartender
- Junius Matthews as Dr. Courtney
- Marion Martin as Millie
- Archie Twitchell as George Mitchell (as Michael Branden)
- Maurice St. Clair as Dancer (as St. Clair)
- Vilova as Dancer
- Robert Williams as Second Detective

== Response ==
=== Film writers ===
Classed as a noteworthy film noir, Black Angel was based on Cornell Woolrich's novel 1943 The Black Angel, and directed by Roy William Neill as his final feature film. According to Encyclopedia of Film Noir author Geoff Mayer, there were many differences from the original story, and Woolrich himself disliked the film. However, in the opinion of Woolrich biographer Thomas C. Renzi, of the several contemporary "adaptations based on Woolrich's novels, Neill's film ranks among the most competently conceived and produced, even though its plot has only a superficial connection" with the original story line. According to Francis M. Nevins (quoted in Thomas Renzi's, Cornell Woolrich from Pulp Noir to Film Noir) "Neill and cinematographer Paul Ivano invest every shot with a visual style which translates Woolrich as any novel needs to be translated: with total fidelity to its essence and little if any to its literal text." According to Hollywood observer John Howard Reid in Movie Mystery & Suspense, credit is also due to Dan Duryea for his interpretation of the part of Marty Blair, who "remains the most sympathetic character in the film and far worthier of the heroine than her weak and disloyal husband". In The Nation in 1946, critic James Agee wrote: "Black Angel is pretty good entertainment ... Most of the people who wrote, directed, photographed, and played in this one have worked as if they believed that no job is so trivial but what it deserves the best you have. I particularly liked Dan Duryea's performance."

Has been shown on the Turner Classic Movies show 'Noir Alley' with Eddie Muller.
