= Lizabeth Paravisini-Gebert =

Puerto Rican academic (born 1953)

- Born: Lizabeth Paravisini; March 21, 1953 (age 73); Puerto Rico
- Education: University of Puerto Rico, Río Piedras; New York University
- Occupation: Academic
- Spouse: Gordon Gebert (m. 1988)
- Children: 1

Lizabeth Paravisini-Gebert (born 1953) is a Puerto Rican academic who specializes in research of the Caribbean. She holds the Sarah Tod Fitz Randolph Distinguished Professor Chair at Vassar College.

== Early life and education ==
Lizabeth Paravisini was born in 1953 in Puerto Rico to Virgenmina (née Rivera) and Domingo Paravisini. She grew up in Puerto Rico and completed a Bachelor of Arts degree at the University of Puerto Rico, Río Piedras in 1973 in comparative literature. Continuing her education, she moved to New York City and completed a Master of Arts degree in 1976 at New York University. Paravisini furthered her post-graduate education at New York University, earning a Master of Philosophy in 1980 and a Ph.D. in 1982. She married Gordon Gebert in 1988, a former child actor, who is a professor of architecture at City College of New York. They have one son, and she is stepmother to Gebert's two daughters from his first marriage.

== Career ==
In 1981, Paravisini-Gebert began her career teaching as an associate professor in the interdisciplinary Puerto Rican studies program at City University of New York in Brooklyn. Ten years later, she moved to Vassar College, teaching Caribbean culture and literature. Caribbean studies first began to emerge in the middle of the 1980s, and Paravisini-Gebert's career has sought to provide study and future scholarship regarding the cultural and environmental history of the region. She has argued that studies of the region must encompass a broad understanding of both the shared and separate histories of the islands in the region, as those focusing too narrowly on commonalities or post-colonial theory miss the complexities of the cultures. Works, such as Phyllis Shand Allfrey and Decolonizing Feminism: The Home-Grown Roots of Caribbean Women's Movements, explored these complexities and how race relations and the drive for self-determination shaped women's lives.

In her early career, Paravisini-Gebert brought together women literary figures from throughout the region to both raise awareness of their works and compare and contrast the different socio-economic-political factors that shaped their perspectives. In works such as El placer de la palabra: literatura erótica femenina de América Latina; antología crítica (The Pleasure of the Word: Feminine Erotic Literature from Latin America: Critical Anthology), Green Cane and Juicy Flotsam: Short Stories by Caribbean Women, and Caribbean Women Novelists: An Annotated Critical Bibliography, she and her co-writers brought together a diverse group of women's writings that address the neglect of scholarship on women authors from Latin America and Caribbean, who often were known in their lifetimes and obscured after their deaths. Richard D. Woods, a specialist in Iberoamerican Studies at Trinity University, noted that Caribbean Women Novelists was one of the first collections of women writers from throughout the region, filling a void in information on women writers.

In addition to her works on women's literature, Paravisini-Gebert has studied art and religious practices, including Creole religions in the Caribbean. Such works as Sacred Possessions: Vodou, Santería, Obeah, and the Caribbean and Healing Cultures: Art and Religion as Curative Practices in the Caribbean and Its Diaspora use a multi-disciplinary approach to evaluate cultural and linguistic patterns that connect art and religious practices in the region. From 2009 to 2012, she was the director of Environmental Studies at Vassar and her works expanded perceptions of the field through interdisciplinary research, which confirmed that rather than simply a hard scientific field, environmental studies had broader applicability. For example, in works such as Displacements and Transformations in Caribbean Literature and Culture and Deforestation and the Yearning for Lost Landscapes in Caribbean Literatures she evaluated how the plantation culture and modern development have reshaped the Caribbean environment.

== Selected works ==
- Fernández Olmos, Margarite; Paravisini-Gebert, Lizabeth, eds. (1991). El Placer de la palabra: literatura erótica femenina de América Latina: antología crítica [The Pleasure of the Word: Feminine Erotic Literature from Latin America: Critical Anthology] (in Spanish). Mexico City: Planeta Mexicana. ISBN 978-968-406-006-7.
- Esteves, Carmen C.; Paravisini-Gebert, Lizabeth, eds. (1991). Green Cane and Juicy Flotsam: Short Stories by Caribbean Women. New Brunswick, New Jersey: Rutgers University Press. ISBN 978-0-8135-1738-4.
- Paravisini-Gebert, Lizabeth; Torres-Seda, Olga (1993). Caribbean Women Novelists: An Annotated Critical Bibliography. Westport, Connecticut: Greenwood Press. ISBN 978-0-313-28342-0.
- Paravisini-Gebert, Lizabeth (1996). Phyllis Shand Allfrey: A Caribbean life. New Brunswick, New Jersey: Rutgers University Press. ISBN 978-0-8135-2265-4.
- Fernández Olmos, Margarite; Paravisini-Gebert, Lizabeth (1997). Sacred Possessions: Vodou, Santería, Obeah, and the Caribbean. New Brunswick, New Jersey: Rutgers University Press. ISBN 978-0-8135-2361-3.
- Paravisini-Gebert, Lizabeth (1997). "Decolonizing Feminism: The Home-Grown Roots of Caribbean Women's Movements". In Lopez Springfield, Consuelo (ed.). Daughters of Caliban: Caribbean women in the twentieth century. Bloomington, Indiana: Indiana University Press. pp. 3–17. ISBN 978-0-253-33249-3.
- Fernández Olmos, Margarite; Paravisini-Gebert, Lizabeth, eds. (2001). Healing Cultures: Art and Religion as Curative Practices in the Caribbean and its Diaspora. New York, New York: Palgrave Macmillan. ISBN 978-1-137-07647-2.
- Paravisini-Gebert, Lizabeth; Romero-Cesareo, Ivette (2008). Displacements and Transformations in Caribbean Cultures. Gainesville, Florida: University Press of Florida. ISBN 978-0-8130-3218-4.
- Paravisini-Gebert, Lizabeth (2011). "Deforestation and the Yearning for Lost Landscapes in Caribbean Literatures". In DeLoughrey, Elizabeth M.; Handley, George B. (eds.). Postcolonial Ecologies: Literatures of the Environment. New York, New York: Oxford University Press. pp. 99–116. ISBN 978-0-19-539442-9.
