= Chicago Calling =

1951 film by John Reinhardt

- Theatrical release poster
- Directed by: John Reinhardt
- Screenplay by: John Reinhardt; Peter Berneis
- Produced by: Peter Berneis
- Starring: Dan Duryea; Mary Anderson; Gordon Gebert; Ross Elliott
- Cinematography: Robert De Grasse
- Edited by: Arthur H. Nadel
- Music by: Heinz Roemheld
- Production company: Arrowhead Pictures
- Distributed by: United Artists
- Release date: December 4, 1951 (New York)
- Running time: 75 minutes
- Country: United States
- Language: English

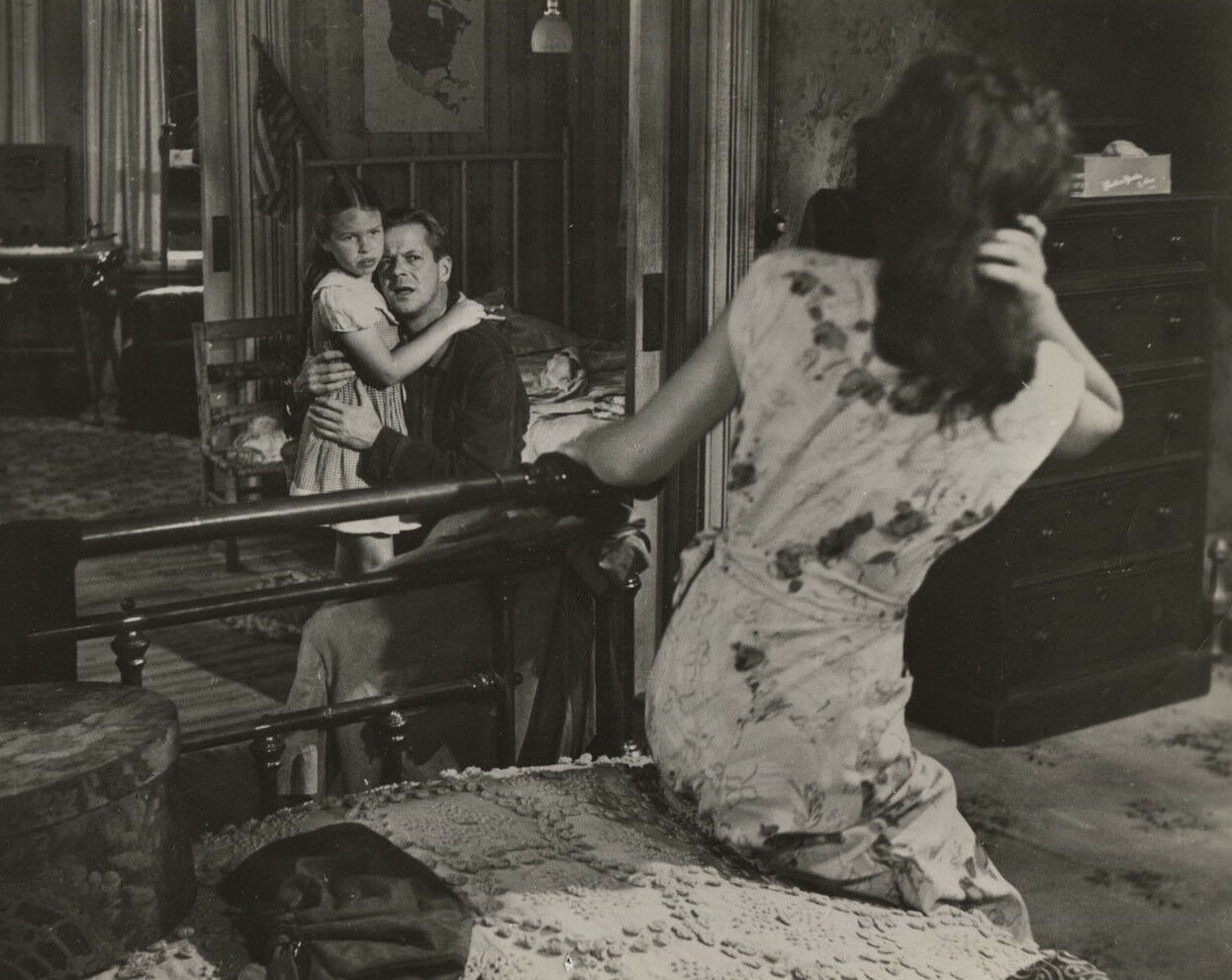
Melinda Plowman, Dan Duryea and Mary Anderson in Chicago Calling

Chicago Calling is a 1951 drama film directed by John Reinhardt and starring Dan Duryea and Mary Anderson.

== Plot ==
Bill Cannon's excessive drinking and inability to hold a job cost him his family. His wife Mary moves to her mother's in Baltimore with her daughter Nancy. An aspiring but failed photographer, Bill pawns his camera to pay for Mary's car-ride share but proceeds to binge on alcohol.

Finally returning home two days later, Bill meets telephone lineman Jim, who is removing the phone because of an overdue bill. A telegram arrives from Mary informing Bill that Nancy has been seriously injured in a car crash near Chicago and will need surgery, and that Mary will call him after the operation to let him know how Nancy is.

Bill persuades Jim to keep the phone line active for 24 more hours. He desperately seeks ways to acquire the $53 that he needs but is refused loans and relief. A young boy, Bobby Kimball, accidentally injures Bill's dog with his bicycle. Bill and Bobby become friends and Bill learns that Bobby is being raised by an abusive sister, Babs, who intends to place him in an orphanage when she marries her boyfriend. Bobby offers $57.75 that he has saved from working at the market to Bill to pay for the phone service. However, Bobby discovers that his savings bank is missing. Babs' boyfriend is napping on Bobby's bed and a roll of money has slipped from his pocket. After Babs tells Bobby that she hid the bank for safety, Bill leaves. Bobby finds Bill and gives him the boyfriend's money, more than $100. They agree that Bill will use what he needs, and when Bobby finds his own money, he will replace it all in a manner that will ensure that the boyfriend never knows his money had been taken.

The phone company is closed by the time that Bill arrives, so he and Bobby attend a baseball game. Bill's conscience forces him to return the money. Babs and her boyfriend return home as Bill is trying to call Chicago from their apartment. Bobby and Bill inform them that they have returned the money, but the boyfriend phones the police.

Bill lands an overnight job on a construction site and, with the money from the job, calls Chicago from a pay phone. Bobby finds Bill to inform him that the police will likely arrive. No information is forthcoming from Chicago, so they return to Bill's. Bobby also mentions that Jim has come to remove the phone. However, the lineman calls from the telephone pole to tell Bill that he will allow him to receive the call from Mary. As the police arrive to arrest Bill, the call arrives, but Bill learns that his daughter has died. Overhearing the news, the officers allow Bill to remain free.

Bill wanders carelessly through the city, and at a railroad yard, he contemplates suicide. Bobby, who has followed him, screams as a train approaches Bill. After the train passes, the yard engineer asks Bill whether he had been trying to kill himself and whether Bobby is his son. Bill assures the engineer and Bobby that he will not kill himself and that Bobby is his son.

== Cast ==
- Dan Duryea as William R. Cannon
- Mary Anderson as Mary Cannon
- Gordon Gebert as Bobby
- Ross Elliott as Jim
- Melinda Plowman as Nancy Cannon
- Judy Brubaker as Barbara 'Babs' Kimball
- Marsha Jones as Peggy
- Roy Engel as Pete

== Reception ==
In a contemporary review for the San Francisco Examiner, critic Hortense Morton wrote: "The touching drama is its own worst enemy. It plucks at the heart strings. But where it could have played a stirring sonata, it settles for a hearts and flowers medley. ... There is more human appeal here than in many a film in a long time. ... Duryea may take all acclaim for this one. It's his sincere and honest performance as the desperate and honorably [sic] guy that puts over the story—kid actors notwithstanding!"
