= Along Came Jones (film) =

1945 film by Stuart Heisler

- Theatrical poster
- Directed by: Stuart Heisler
- Written by: Nunnally Johnson
- Based on: Useless Cowboy by Alan Le May
- Produced by: Gary Cooper; Walter Thompson
- Starring: Gary Cooper; Loretta Young; Dan Duryea; William Demarest
- Cinematography: Milton R. Krasner
- Edited by: Thomas Neff
- Music by: Arthur Lange
- Production companies: International Pictures; Cinema Artists
- Distributed by: RKO Radio Pictures
- Release date: June 20, 1945
- Running time: 90 minutes
- Country: United States
- Language: English

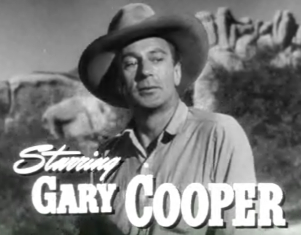
Cooper in Along Came Jones

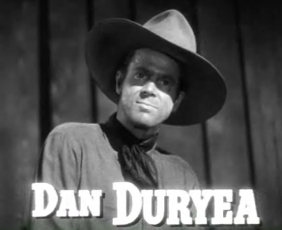
Dan Duryea

Along Came Jones is a 1945 American Western comedy film directed by Stuart Heisler and starring Gary Cooper, Loretta Young, William Demarest, and Dan Duryea. The film was adapted by Nunnally Johnson from the 1944 novel Useless Cowboy by Alan Le May. It was the only feature film produced by Cooper during his long film career.

Much of the film was shot at the Iverson Movie Ranch in Chatsworth, California. Cooper had previously worked at the movie ranch in The Lives of a Bengal Lancer (1935) and other productions. Cooper had a Western town built at the movie ranch for Along Came Jones; this Western set was subsequently used in many other productions over the next 20 years and became a fixture in B-Westerns in particular.

The film spoofs many Western film cliches as well as the Western persona that Cooper played in previous films, such as the lead character being unable to shoot straight and partial to singing "silly songs" while riding his horse.

== Plot ==
Easygoing Melody Jones and his friend George Fury wander into a town. Jones is mistaken for a wanted bandit named Monte Jarrad, which causes him no end of trouble. Meanwhile, the real Jarrad is hiding out in the home of his girl, Cherry de Longpre. At first, she tries to use the newcomer to distract the townsfolk, but as she gets to know Jones, her feelings start to change.

== Cast ==
- Gary Cooper as Melody Jones
- Loretta Young as Cherry de Longpre
- William Demarest as George Fury
- Dan Duryea as Monte Jarrad
- Frank Sully as Avery de Longpre
- Don Costello as Leo Gledhill
- Walter Sande as Ira Waggoner
- Russell Simpson as Pop de Longpre
- Arthur Loft as Sheriff
- Willard Robertson as Luke Packard
- Ray Teal as Kriendler
- Lane Chandler as Boone
- Erville Alderson as Bartender (uncredited)
- Hank Bell as Posse Rider (uncredited)

== Production ==
Along Came Jones was produced under the working title American Cowboy. It was Cooper's first Western since The Westerner in 1940. It was also Cooper's first film as an independent producer under his International Pictures, Inc., with Cinema Artists Corp. co-producing, and the only film in which he both acted and produced. Cooper also selected Young as his co-star.

Much of the film was shot at the Iverson Movie Ranch in Chatsworth, California, where Cooper built the town of Payneville for the script. This Western set was used in many other productions over the next 20 years. Other outdoor filming locations included Sasabe, Tucson, and Nogales, Arizona. A number of exterior scenes were filmed in indoor sound stages backed by giant cycloramas. Scenes of the actors riding horses and exchanging dialogue were filmed with rear-projection screens.

== Critical reception ==
Martin and Porter's DVD guide describes Along Came Jones as a "[h]ighly watchable comic western," giving it a rating of 4 out of 5 ("Very Good"). Variety called the film "a better-than-average western" and commended Cooper's and Young's performances. Bosley Crowther writes in his review for The New York Times: "Mr. Cooper is the guy who can play it. His Melody is a most congenial gent—butter-fingered and mentally clumsy, but disarmingly winning withal". A Trailers from Hell review wrote that the film "is concocted to please the Cooper fans, a mix of comedy, sentiment, romance and a little fancy gunplay". This review calls the film's first act "almost as funny as a Preston Sturges movie", and the first two acts "nearly flawless".

== Radio adaptation ==
Along Came Jones was presented on This Is Hollywood December 28, 1946. Janet Blair and Joel McCrea starred in the adaptation.

== In popular culture ==
The film's ironic title probably inspired the popular 1959 Coasters song "Along Came Jones" written by Leiber and Stoller; songwriter Mike Stoller had studied orchestration under Arthur Lange, the composer of the film's score.

In the film Cooper sings the song "I'm a Poor Lonesome Cowboy", which would later become the signature song of Lucky Luke in the eponymous comics series by René Goscinny and Morris.
