= Gordon Gebert =

American child actor, professor (born 1941)

- Born: Gordon Alan Gebert Jr. October 17, 1941 (age 84); Des Moines, Iowa, U.S.
- Occupations: Child actor, professor, architect
- Years active: 1949–60
- Spouse(s): Phyllis DeReamer (m. 1973; div. 19??) Lizabeth Paravisini-Gebert (m. 1988)
- Children: 3

Dr. Gordon Alan Gebert Jr. (born October 17, 1941) is an American former child actor, architect, and professor predominantly known for playing Janet Leigh's son in Holiday Affair and for smaller roles. In adulthood, he trained as an architect and has taught at the City College of New York.

== Biography ==
Gebert was born in Des Moines, Iowa, in 1941 to Gordon and Violette Gebert. His father was a salesman for a trailer company and sold truck and bus fleets for Ford Motor Company in Iowa. In 1948, Gebert, aged seven, moved with his family to Van Nuys, California. In 1949, Gebert was cast as WWII widow Janet Leigh's son in the movie Holiday Affair. Thereafter, he appeared in nine full-length feature films, including the highly regarded films noir The Narrow Margin and The House on Telegraph Hill, and two shorts released between 1950 and 1970, always playing the role of a son.

Gebert also performed in minor roles in 15 episodes of various television series, including The Donna Reed Show (one episode, 1959), and Bachelor Father (one episode, 1960). Gebert's final performance was in a Christian youth scare film.

After graduating from Van Nuys High School, Gebert enrolled at University of California, Los Angeles before transferring to the University of Southern California. He earned a bachelor's degree in architecture at the age of 25 from Massachusetts Institute of Technology's Department of Architecture in 1966 and a master's degree from Princeton University in 1968.

Since 1971, he has been a professor at New York's City College Spitzer School of Architecture, where he was Acting Dean of Architecture from 2015 to 2019. Gebert has been licensed to practice architecture in New York State since 1973.

== Personal life ==
Gebert married Phyllis A. DeReamer of Greenfield, Massachusetts, in 1973; they later divorced. The couple had two daughters.

In 1988, Gebert married Lizabeth Paravisini-Gebert, a professor of Hispanic Studies at Vassar College. They reside in Manhattan, New York, and have a son.

== Filmography ==
- Holiday Affair (1949) ... Timmy
- The Flame and the Arrow (1950) ... Rudi Bartoli
- Saddle Tramp (1950) ... Johnnie
- Chicago Calling (1951) ... Bobby
- The House on Telegraph Hill (1951) ... Christopher
- Night Into Morning (1951) ... Russ Kirby
- Flying Leathernecks (1951) ... Tommy Kirby
- The Narrow Margin (1952) ... Tommy Sinclair
- To Hell and Back (1955) ... Audie as a boy
- Summer Love (1971) ... Tad Powers

== Publications ==
- Gebert, G. A. (1966). Thesis: A continuing education conference center for Massachusetts Institute of Technology.
- Gebert, G. A. (1985), Urban and Regional Information Systems Association. Academy of Local Government Information Sciences., & Local Government Computer Services Board of Ireland. Local government and information technology: Papers and reports from the International workshop held at Ennis, Co. Clare, Ireland, April 24–27, 1984. Oxford: Pergamon Press.
- Gebert, G. A. (1985). "Application development approaches in a MUMPS environment". Journal of Medical Systems, 9, 3, 155–162.
- Gebert, G. A. (1986), Editorial: Software survey section. Computers, Environment and Urban Systems, 11, 3.
