= Do You Know This Voice? =

1964 British film by Frank Nesbitt

- Directed by: Frank Nesbitt
- Written by: Neil McCallum
- Based on: Do You Know This Voice? by Evelyn Berckman
- Produced by: Jack Parsons
- Starring: Dan Duryea; Isa Miranda; Gwen Watford
- Cinematography: Arthur Lavis
- Edited by: Robert Winter
- Music by: Carlo Martelli
- Production company: Parroch-McCallum
- Distributed by: British Lion Films
- Release date: December 1964
- Running time: 80 minutes
- Country: United Kingdom
- Language: English

Do You Know This Voice? is a 1964 British neo-noir film directed by Frank Nesbitt and starring Dan Duryea, Isa Miranda and Gwen Watford. It was written by Neil McCallum based on the 1960 novel of the same title by Evelyn Berckman. The film was released directly to television in the UK.

== Plot ==
A child goes missing. Using a woman as bait, the police try to trace the telephone call by the kidnapper demanding £2,000 from the parents.

== Cast ==
- Dan Duryea as Hopta
- Isa Miranda as Mrs. Marotta
- Gwen Watford as Mrs. Hopta
- Peter Madden as Superintendent Hume
- Barry Warren as Detective Sergeant Connor
- Alan Edwards as Mr. Wilson
- Jean Aubrey as Trudy
- Shirley Cameron as Mrs. Wilson
- Arnold Bell as Desk Sergeant
- Patrick Newell as neighbour
- Hedger Wallace as reporter
