= The Eyes of Annie Jones =

1964 American-British film by Reginald LeBorg

- Theatrical poster
- Directed by: Reginald LeBorg
- Written by: Louis Vittes
- Based on: story by Henry Slesar
- Produced by: Neil McCallum; Jack Parsons
- Starring: Richard Conte; Francesca Annis; Joyce Carey
- Cinematography: Peter Hennessy
- Edited by: Robert Winter
- Music by: Buxton Orr
- Production companies: Jack Parsons-Neil McCallum Productions; Associated Producers Inc
- Distributed by: 20th Century Fox (US); Rank Film Distributors (UK)
- Release date: May 13, 1964
- Running time: 73 minutes
- Countries: United States; United Kingdom
- Language: English

The Eyes of Annie Jones is a 1964 American-British drama film directed by Reginald LeBorg and starring Richard Conte, Francesca Annis and Joyce Carey. It was written by Louis Vittes. The film tells the story of a sleepwalking young woman involved with a murder.

Director LeBorg has claimed that the 1978 movie The Eyes of Laura Mars was inspired by The Eyes of Annie Jones.

== Plot ==
Taxi driver Tom Lucas murders wealthy Geraldine Wheeler, with whom he had been having an affair. The victim's Aunt Helen gets in touch with Geraldine's brother David and with Annie Jones, a 17-year-old girl from a nearby orphanage, who is said to have powers of extrasensory perception.

It turns out David has been embezzling from the family and hired Lucas to do the killing. A sleepwalking Annie seems to be possessed by the dead woman's spirit, saying things like, "They won't let me rest." When she approaches a spot where the body is buried, David has to prevent Lucas from killing the girl.

The two men have a falling out over money Lucas is still owed. The police become suspicious of him, and Lucas dies after crashing his speeding car. David is arrested, and the body and soul of Geraldine had not been allowed to rest, now found in the car's trunk.

== Cast ==
- Richard Conte as David Wheeler
- Francesca Annis as Annie Jones
- Joyce Carey as Aunt Helen
- Myrtle Reed as Carol Wheeler
- Shay Gorman as Tom Lucas
- Victor Brooks as Sergeant Henry
- Jean Lodge as Geraldine Wheeler
- Alan Haines as Constable Marlowe
- Mara Purcell as orphanage matron
- Mark Dignam as orphanage director
- Patricia McCarron as Miss Crossley
- Max Bacon as publican Hoskins
- Barbara Leake as Margaret

== Production ==
A low-budget "B movie," The Eyes of Annie Jones was filmed "quickly and cheaply" in England.

The picture was among a number of 20th Century Fox "budget program" projects produced by Jack Parsons. Parsons was also responsible for director Terence Fisher's 1964 The Earth Dies Screaming.

Filming started in March 1963. It was shot in London. Robert L. Lippert tried to persuade Sophia Loren to play the lead.

== Release ==
Film historian Wheeler W. Dixon notes that "the film opened briefly in the United States as supporting feature, and was soon shelved after its initial run."

== Reception ==
The Monthly Film Bulletin wrote: "Having cast aside conventional suspense by disclosing the secrets of its murder plot early on, this odd little detective thriller compensates with some rather good characterisation and, on the whole, rather good acting. Unfortunately the film is hamstrung throughout by uninspired direction which plods stolidly and unimaginatively on to the bitter end."

Critic Howard Thompson at the New York Times declares that the film is "a bore from start to finish, consistently inept and transparent." Thompson names the producer, director and the scriptwriter as the "creative culprits" in the endeavor, adding rhetorically "why did anybody make this picture?"

== Retrospective appraisal ==
Dixon suggests that any merits that The Eyes of Annie Jones might possess have not appeared with age: "The film remains stage-bound in a drab apartment for most of its length, and finally emerges as a plodding police procedural."

Allowing that Richard Conte, as the "rackish embezzler" seeking his missing sister is "good," Dixon disparages Francesca Anna's acting as "flat, monotonous, and does little to enhance the film." Dixon notes that director Reginald LeBorg did "not do as well as he might have with the material."
