= Jack Parsons (producer) =

Jack Parsons (1906–1971) was a British film producer. He was best known for his association with Robert L. Lippert, with whom he made several films.

The American Lippert teamed up with Parsons (who became a producer after selling his chain of cinemas in northern England) for a handful of low-budget, black-and-white thrillers in the 1960s. All of them were shot in England, with British casts headlined by American actors that have been described as "fading American stars." This strategy, which Lippert previously used with Hammer Film Productions in the 1950s, helped to ensure distribution in both countries. It was through this arrangement that Lon Chaney Jr. starred in what would be his only British production, Witchcraft (1964). Among other films he produced include The Eyes of Annie Jones (1963), Do You Know This Voice? (1964), and Catacombs (1965, released in the United States as The Woman Who Wouldn't Die).

== Select filmography ==
- Life in Danger (1959)
- Doomsday at Eleven (1962)
- The Eyes of Annie Jones (1963)
- Walk a Tightrope (1964)
- Do You Know This Voice? (1964)
- The Earth Dies Screaming (1964)
- Catacombs (1965)
- The Murder Game (1965)
- The Return of Mr. Moto (1965)
- Curse of the Fly (1965)

== Bibliography ==
- Svehla, Gary; Svehla, Susan (1997). Lon Chaney, Jr. Midnight Marquee Press. ISBN 978-1-887664-15-8.
