= Walk a Tightrope =

- Theatrical release poster
- Directed by: Frank Nesbitt
- Screenplay by: Neil McCallum
- Story by: Mann Rubin
- Produced by: Jack Parsons
- Starring: Dan Duryea; Patricia Owens; Terence Cooper; Richard Leech; Neil McCallum; Trevor Reid
- Cinematography: Basil Emmott
- Edited by: Robert Winter
- Music by: Buxton Orr
- Production companies: Jack Parsons-Neil McCallum Productions; Associated Producers
- Distributed by: Paramount Pictures
- Release dates: October 30, 1964 (Sweden); February 12, 1965 (United States)
- Running time: 69 minutes
- Countries: United States; United Kingdom
- Language: English

Walk a Tightrope is a 1964 Anglo-American crime film directed by Frank Nesbitt, written by Neil McCallum, and starring Dan Duryea, Patricia Owens, Terence Cooper, Richard Leech, Neil McCallum and Trevor Reid. It was released on February 12, 1965, by Paramount Pictures.

== Plot ==
An American living in Britain claims he was hired by a woman to kill her husband whom she clearly loves, but all is not what it seems.

== Cast ==
- Dan Duryea as Carl Lutcher
- Patricia Owens as Ellen Sheppard
- Terence Cooper as Jason Sheppard
- Richard Leech as Doug Randle
- Neil McCallum as Counsel
- Trevor Reid as Inspector MacMitchell
- A. J. Brown as Magistrate
- David Bauer as Ed
- Shirley Cameron as Maisie
