= Jay Bennett (author) =

American novelist (1912–2009)

- Born: December 24, 1912; New York City
- Died: June 27, 2009 (aged 96); Cherry Hill, New Jersey
- Occupation: Author
- Writing career
- Period: 1940s–1990s
- Genre: Mystery
- Notable works: The Long Black Coat; The Dangling Witness; The Skeleton Man; Miracle for Christmas
- Notable awards: Edgar Award (twice)

Jay Bennett (December 24, 1912 – June 27, 2009) was an American author and two-time winner of the Edgar Award from the Mystery Writers of America. Bennett won the Edgar for Best Juvenile novel in 1974 and 1975, for The Long Black Coat (Delacorte Press) and The Dangling Witness (Delacorte Press), respectively. He was the first author to win an Edgar in consecutive years. A third book, The Skeleton Man (Franklin Watts), was nominated in 1987. Bennett is best known among English teachers and young adults for these and other juvenile mysteries, like Deathman, Do Not Follow Me (Scholastic).

== Early life ==
He was born to Jewish parents, Pincus Shapiro, an immigrant from Czarist Russia, and Estelle Bennett, a second-generation American who was a native of New York City. His father, a manager of a wholesale dry-goods company, and mother, the company's head bookkeeper, were able to provide a middle-class upbringing. Bennett was educated at the Hebrew Institute of Boro Park in Brooklyn and then at James Madison High School in the Flatbush section of the boro. After graduation, he enrolled in New York University but dropped out during the Great Depression. Unable to find a job, he went West, hitchhiking, riding open freights, and sometimes sleeping in small-town jails, which also were open to house the jobless as they wandered in search of employment. Upon his return to New York City, he had a succession of odd jobs before he was able to break into writing. During this time, he also met Sally Stern, a beautician, and they were married in February 1937.

== Career ==
Bennett began his writing career in radio, authoring 27 half-hour scripts prior to the first one being sold. During radio's Golden Age, he wrote scripts for Grand Central Station, Bulldog Drummond, The Falcon, The Kate Smith Show, Manhattan at Midnight, and Mystery Theater. His play, Miracle for Christmas(script), was broadcast annually on Christmas Eve as part of the Grand Central Station series throughout the 1940s and early 1950s. The play, narrated by Ken Roberts and featuring Mason Adams, is part of the Walter Cronkite anthology, 60 Greatest Old-Time Radio Shows of the 20th Century (Radio Spirits).

For the War years of 1942 to 1945, Bennett worked as an English features writer and editor for the United States Office of War Information.

Following the war, he turned to the theater and had two plays produced. No Hiding Place, a three-act play, was produced by Erwin Piscator's Dramatic Workshop of the New School at Broadway's President Theatre (1946). The cast, directed by Maria Ley Piscator, included Sarah Cunningham, Anna Berger, and Salem Ludwig. Lions After Slumber, also a three-act play, was produced at London's Unity Theatre (1948).

In the early days of television, Bennett authored scripts for Monodrama Theater (DuMont, 1952–1953), Harlem Detective (WOR-TV NYC, 1953), Crime Syndicated (CBS, 1951), Cameo Theatre (NBC, 1950–1955), High Tension (WOR, 1953), I-Spy (Syndicated, 1956), Wide Wide World (NBC, 1956), Good Morning (with Will Rogers, Jr.) (CBS, 1957), and Alfred Hitchcock Presents (1957), among other shows. Harlem Detective, for which he was the principal writer, was the first TV show on a national network to co-star a Black actor in a non-stereotyped role alongside a White actor. The Black detective was played first by William Hairston and then by William Marshall.

Also of note from this period was Mono-Drama Theatre, which began as a daytime series on the DuMont Television Network's New York outlet, WABD-TV, and was later moved to a night-time slot. The series, which won the 1952 Variety Show Management Award, was divided into two parts titled, "One Man's Experience" and "One Woman's Experience." Each part featured a single actor on a spare set, often performing adaptions of classics in mini-series format. Hamlet, which Bennett adapted for this format, was one of the first presentations of the play in the new TV medium in the United States. The live broadcast, starring Jack Manning, took place in daily 15-minute segments over a two-week period, with Manning in contemporary dress and delivering selected portions in modern language. Due to the mini-series format, the modern adaptation, and the day-time audience which, in those days, consisted mostly of housewives, the show was considered by some as Shakespearean soap opera. Others, however, found the adaptation more significant. The New York Times TV critic Jack Gould called it "A highly novel theatrical experiment ..." and "... an immensely interesting show", while the Brooklyn Eagle described it as a "... daring experiment in presenting classics in modern dress ..." The show was successful enough that the entire two-week mini-series was reprised in the new night-time slot. Subsequent Mono-Drama classical adaptations included The Tell-Tale Heart, Jane Eyre, Silas Marner, and The Taming of the Shrew. Later in 1953, the show moved to New York's WOR-TV as a half-hour offering, where it took the name High Tension, and continued to present classics adapted by Bennett. Among the more critically acclaimed productions were Robert Louis Stevenson's Markheim with Jack Manning and Dostoevsky's Crime and Punishment with Martin Kosleck

When the locus of TV production moved to Los Angeles in the late 1950s, Bennett remained in New York, taking a job as an editor for Grolier, an encyclopedia publisher. Also at this time, he began writing fictional books. From the 1960s through the 1990s, Bennett authored over 25 novels, initially for adults and then for young adults. His first novel, Catacombs (published by Abelard-Schuman), was made into a movie, The Woman Who Wouldn't Die (aka Catacombs) (1965), a British production starring Gary Merrill and Jane Merrow. The film, the first by director Gordon Hessler, was released on DVD in 2014 by Network as part of its "British Film" collection. According to UK Horror Scene, "... Catacombs remains an intriguingly rare slice of British genre filmmaking."

Bennett's young-adult novels were particularly well-regarded because they dealt with such timely topics as teenage suicide (Dark Corridor, Fawcett), drunken driving (Coverup, Franklin Watts), and racial prejudice (Skinhead, Franklin Watts); generally posed significant ethical dilemmas; were fast-paced; and were easy to read. While the titles of his mysteries were invariably dark, his books hinged more on implied violence and threats than on murder itself. The usual Bennett hero was a late-teenage loner drawn by circumstances beyond his control into a treacherous and confusing situation. A recurring theme was the need to reject alienation in favor of reaching out to others. His best work was considered not only quite suspenseful, but written at a maturity level that was appropriate for, and able to connect deeply with, his teen audience.

Translations of Bennett's books can be found in well over a dozen languages.

Bennett died on June 27, 2009, at the age of 96 at his home in Cherry Hill, New Jersey.

== Repertoire ==
Novels for Adults

Catacombs (Abelard-Schuman, 1959);
Murder Money (Crest, 1963);
Death is a Silent Room (Abelard-Schuman, 1965)

Novels for Young Adults

Deathman, Do Not Follow Me (Meredith Press, 1968);
The Deadly Gift (Meredith Press, 1969);
Masks: A Love Story (Franklin Watts, 1972);
The Killing Tree (Franklin Watts, 1972);
Shadows Offstage (Nelson, 1974);
The Long Black Coat (Delacorte Press, 1973);
The Dangling Witness (Delacorte Press, 1974);
Say Hello to the Hit Man (Delacorte Press, 1976);
The Birthday Murderer (Delacorte Press, 1977);
The Pigeon (Methuen, 1980);
The Executioner (Avon, 1982);
Slowly, Slowly, I Raise the Gun (Avon, 1983);
I Never Said I Loved You (Avon, 1984);
The Death Ticket (Avon, 1985);
To Be a Killer (Scholastic, 1985);
The Skeleton Man (Franklin Watts, 1986);
The Haunted One (Fawcett, 1989);
Sing Me a Death Song (Franklin Watts, 1990);
Dark Corridor (Fawcett, 1990);
Skinhead (Franklin Watts, 1991);
Coverup (Franklin Watts, 1991);
Death Grip (Fawcett, 1993);
The Hooded Man (Fawcett, 1993)

Short Stories for Young Adults

The Most Dishonest Thing. (In The New Book of Knowledge Annual 1973, pp. 178–180, Grolier, 1973)
I Don't Understand. (In The New Book of Knowledge Annual 1974, pp. 186–189, Grolier, 1974)
A Million Dollar Caper. (In The New Book of Knowledge Annual 1976, pp. 232–237, Grolier, 1976)
The Guiccioli Miniature. (In T. Pines [Ed.], Thirteen: 13 Tales of Horror by 13 Masters of Horror, pp. 73–82, Scholastic, 1991)
My Brother's Keeper. (In M. J. Weiss & H. S. Weiss, [Eds.], From One Experience to Another, pp. 15–30, Forge, 1997)

== Additional sources ==
- Donnelson, K. L., & Nilsen, A. P. (Eds.). (1980). "People Behind the Books: Jay Bennett." In Literature for Today’s Young Adults. Glenview, IL: Scott, Foresman, and Co., pp. 425.
