= Catacombs (1965 film) =

1965 British film by Gordon Hessler

- UK theatrical release poster
- Directed by: Gordon Hessler
- Screenplay by: Daniel Mainwaring
- Based on: Catacombs (1959 novel) by Jay Bennett
- Produced by: Neil McCallum; Jack Parsons
- Starring: Gary Merrill; Georgina Cookson; Jane Merrow
- Cinematography: Arthur Lavis
- Edited by: Robert Winter
- Music by: Carlo Martelli
- Production companies: Parroch-McCallum; Associated Producers International; British Lion
- Distributed by: British Lion Films (UK); Warner Bros. Pictures (U.S.)
- Release date: 5 May 1965
- Running time: 84 minutes
- Country: United Kingdom
- Language: English

Catacombs (U.S. title: The Woman Who Wouldn't Die) is a 1965 British horror film directed by Gordon Hessler and starring Gary Merrill, Georgina Cookson and Jane Merrow. The screenplay was by Daniel Mainwaring based on the 1959 novel of the same title by Jay Bennett.

== Plot ==
An astute business woman is murdered by her husband who intends to carry on with his affair with her niece after her death. However, he soon finds himself haunted by his late wife.

== Cast ==
- Gary Merrill as Raymond Garth
- Georgina Cookson as Ellen Garth
- Jane Merrow as Alice Taylor
- Neil McCallum as Richard 'Dick' Corbett
- Rachel Thomas as Christine
- Jack Train as solicitor
- Frederick Piper as Inspector Murcott

== Production ==
=== Filming ===
The film was shot at Shepperton Studios with sets designed by the art director George Provis.

=== Distribution ===
Warner Brothers picked it up for distribution in the US.

== Critical reception ==
The Monthly Film Bulletin wrote: "One would have thought that the days of the murder story with the corpse buried in the potting-shed were long over, but the situation is revived here not entirely without effect. The preliminaries setting the domestic scene are much too long, but after the murder things perk up considerably, with one or two nice macabre effects. The acting is sound enough in general, with a striking performance by Georgina Cookson as the bitchy wife."

Variety wrote: "What could have easily been one of those quickie, murder-on-the-moors thrillers which the British seem to turn out over a weekend, this Jack Parsons production comes off something better than average because of a very good performance by Georgina Cookson and taut direction by Gordon Hessler of Dan Mainwaring's spare but neat screenplay. There are few surprises in the basically simple plot but the cast acts with more inventiveness than is usually found in these programners."

Leslie Halliwell wrote "Involved melodrama with rather too many twists."
