= Criss Cross (film) =

1949 film by Robert Siodmak

- Theatrical release poster
- Directed by: Robert Siodmak
- Screenplay by: Daniel Fuchs
- Based on: Criss Cross; 1934 novel by Don Tracy
- Produced by: Michael Kraike
- Starring: Burt Lancaster; Yvonne De Carlo; Dan Duryea
- Cinematography: Franz Planer
- Edited by: Ted J. Kent
- Music by: Miklós Rózsa
- Color process: Black and white
- Production company: Universal-International
- Distributed by: Universal-International
- Release dates: January 19, 1949 (Los Angeles); February 4, 1949 (United States)
- Running time: 88 minutes
- Country: United States
- Language: English

Criss Cross is a 1949 American noir crime tragedy film starring Burt Lancaster, Yvonne De Carlo and Dan Duryea, directed by Robert Siodmak and written by Daniel Fuchs based on Don Tracy's 1934 novel of the same name. The film was shot partly on location in the Bunker Hill section of Los Angeles. Miklós Rózsa scored the film's soundtrack.

== Plot ==
Steve Thompson returns to Los Angeles after two years of drifting trying to shake off a bad divorce, looking for his ex-wife Anna but tormented over seeing her again. Against all better judgment he continues to, resuming his old job as a driver at an armored-truck company.

Fended away by Steve's family and friends, Anna marries mobster Slim Dundee, but kindles a clandestine affair with Thompson. When Dundee catches them together, Thompson lies he was only talking to her to get in touch with Dundee and his gang, because he has a job for them. He proposes to be the inside man for an armored truck robbery. In the chaos of the heist, Thompson's elderly partner, a close family friend who was supposed to have been left unharmed, is killed. Thompson switches sides and he and Dundee exchange gunfire, wounding one another.

In the aftermath the severely injured Thompson is considered a hero who foiled the crime and saved half the payroll.

Thompson is kidnapped from the hospital by one of Dundee's men to be taken to his hideout. He offers the hood $10,000 to drive him to Anna's hiding place instead. She's there, with all the stolen loot. Thompson believes they will go back to the original plan, to double-cross Dundee, make off with all the money and start a new life together. Anna is upset, assuming that the driver will tell Slim where to find her.

Seeing that he will only slow her down, Anna states she needs to look out for herself and will take the entire haul and leave Thompson behind. He says he never cared about the money, he only loved her, and wanted to be together.

Dundee arrives, having assumed Thompson would bribe the driver and lead him to the lovers. Declaring he too had fallen in love with Anna, he shoots both, Anna dying in Thompson's arms. As Dundee turns to flee, sirens fill the air and headlights wash over his face.

== Cast ==
- Burt Lancaster as Steve Thompson
- Yvonne De Carlo as Anna
- Dan Duryea as Slim Dundee
- Stephen McNally as Det. Lt. Pete Ramirez
- Esy Morales as Orchestra Leader
- Tom Pedi as Vincent
- Percy Helton as Frank
- Alan Napier as Finchley
- Robert Osterloh as Mr. Nelson
- Griff Barnett as Pop
- Meg Randall as Helen
- Richard Long as Slade Thompson
- Joan Miller as The Lush
- Edna Holland as Mrs. Thompson
- John Doucette as Walt
- Marc Krah as Mort
- James O'Rear as Waxie
- John 'Skins' Miller as Midget
- Isabel Randolph as Nurse
- Tony Curtis as dancer (uncredited)

== Production notes ==
The production nearly derailed when producer Mark Hellinger died suddenly before filming began.

Tony Curtis made his uncredited screen debut briefly appearing as an extra dancing with De Carlo at the Round-Up Bar.

=== Locations ===
Criss Cross was shot around downtown Los Angeles, beginning with an aerial panorama that ends at a nightclub just north of downtown. Lancaster's character lives with his mother at a house on Hill Street, just above the north entrance of the short Hill Street Tunnel at Temple Street in the Court Hill section of Bunker Hill. The tunnel and the hill above it (including the house) were razed in 1955 for expansion of the Civic Center and a new Los Angeles County Courthouse on Hill Street, which can often be seen in episodes of Perry Mason. For the planning of the heist, Siodmak used the exterior and interiors of the rambling, rundown Sunshine Apartments on the steep Third Street steps between Hill and Olive, just opposite the Angels Flight funicular, seen in the background through the windows of the hotel room. This area of Bunker Hill was a favorite of noir directors, but was all torn down in the 1960s. There is also an extended scene inside and outside Union Station on Alameda near downtown.

== Reception ==
=== Critical response ===
The New York Times film critic T. M. Pierce gave the film a mixed review, writing, "A tough, mildly exciting melodrama about gangsters and a dame named Anna who 'gets into the blood' of a guy named Steve and causes him no end of trouble...In many ways Criss Cross is a suspenseful action picture, due to the resourceful directing of Robert Siodmak. But it also is tedious and plodding at times, due partly to Mr. Siodmak's indulgence of a script that is verbose, redundant and imitative. However, the writers should be credited with having invested the old triangle-gangster formula with a couple of fresh if not exactly revolutionary twists."

The film was reissued by Universal-International in 1959.

=== Reappraisal ===
In 2004, film critic Dennis Schwartz wrote, "Robert Siodmak ... directs this cynical film noir of obsessive love and betrayal. It's 1940s film noir at its most influential as far as style goes, that is further enhanced by the beautiful dark photography of Frank Planer, the tight script by Daniel Fuchs, and the taut pacing by Siodmak. It's based on a story by Don Tracy ... Siodmak keeps the suspense at a feverish pitch, and the characterizations are well drawn out. Criss Cross is one of the great examples of 1940s film noir at its most tragic. A must see film for fans of the genre."

Dave Kehr, film critic for the Chicago Reader, lauded the film and wrote, "Robert Siodmak was one of the most influential stylists of the 40s, helping to create, in films such as Phantom Lady and The Killers, the characteristic look of American film noir. But most of his films have nothing more than their pictorial qualities to recommend them—Criss Cross being one of the few exceptions, an archly noir story replete with triple and quadruple crosses, leading up to one of the most shockingly cynical endings in the whole genre."

Film Noir Foundation founder Eddie Muller lists Criss Cross as No. 2 in his Top 25 Noir Films saying: "Stupidly, I used to think there was something missing at the core. But it keeps getting better every time I see it. De Carlo in the parking lot pleading straight to the camera might be noir's defining moment." He continues: "Robert Siodmak ... had a flair for compositions and camera movements ominous yet elegant. Images simultaneously enticing and foreboding are essential to noir, and Siodmak crafted them like nobody's business. From the first shot ... Siodmak infuses the drama with a dreaminess that gets under your skin like a narcotic."

On the review aggregator website Rotten Tomatoes, 92% of critics gave the film a positive review, based on 12 reviews.

=== Awards ===
Nomination

- Edgar Allan Poe Awards: Edgar, Best Motion Picture, Daniel Fuchs and Don Tracy (novel); 1950.

== Adaptation ==
The film was remade as The Underneath directed by Steven Soderbergh in 1995.
