= Life in Danger =

1959 British film by Terry Bishop

- Theatrical release poster
- Directed by: Terry Bishop
- Written by: Malcolm Hulke; Eric Paice
- Produced by: Jack Parsons
- Starring: Derren Nesbitt; Julie Hopkins
- Edited by: John Trumper
- Music by: William Davies
- Production company: Parroch Films
- Distributed by: Butcher's Film Service
- Release date: 7 September 1959
- Running time: 62 minutes
- Country: United Kingdom
- Language: English

Life in Danger is a 1959 British second feature film directed by Terry Bishop and starring Derren Nesbitt and Julie Hopkins. It was written by Malcolm Hulke and Eric Paice.

== Plot ==
Hazel Ashley, an emotionally unstable adolescent, meets a casual labourer and befriends him. At the same time, news comes that Miller, a convicted child murderer, has just escaped from a nearby lunatic asylum.

Hazel goes missing, and when local villagers led by Major Peters search for her, they find her in a barn with the labourer, whom they assume is the escaped killer. Peters shoots and wounds him. When the police arrive they report that Miller has previously surrendered himself.

== Cast ==
- Derren Nesbitt as the man
- Julie Hopkins as Hazel Ashley
- Howard Marion Crawford as Major Donald Peters
- Victor Brooks as Tom Baldwin
- Jack Allen as Jack Ashley
- Christopher Witty as Johnny Ashley
- Carmel McSharry as Mrs. Ashley
- Mary Manson as Jill Shadwell
- Bruce Seton as George, the landlord
- Peter Swanwick as Dr. Nichols
- Bryan Coleman as Chief Constable Ryman
- Humphrey Lestocq as Inspector Bennet
- Richard Pearson as Sergeant Bert Norris
- Celia Hewitt as woman at bus stop
- Brian Rawlinson as male nurse

== Critical reception ==
The Monthly Film Bulletin wrote: "This attempt at the familiar but always tricky subject of an average community shocked into violence by a threat to its ordinary existence – in this case an escaped criminal lunatic – has a tense opening and two mainly effective leading performances. Unfortunately realism soon takes second place to conventional thrills and a facile climax, and the supporting cast is for the most part unconvincing."

Picturegoer wrote: "A rustic melodrama about a casual worker who is mistaken for an escaped lunatic. ... A touch of sex gives the film additional bite."

In The Radio Times Guide to Films David Parkinson gave the film 2/5 stars, writing: "As Alfred Hitchcock repeatedly demonstrated in films such as The Wrong Man, there is nothing more terrifying for the innocent than finding the evidence in a murder case irrefutably piling up against them while all attempts at establishing an alibi founder on the most untikely caprices of fate. This is the situation confronting Derren Nesbitt in this passable low-budget drama, which is made even more alarming by its picturesque country setting."

In British Sound Films: The Studio Years 1928–1959 David Quinlan rated the film as "average", writing: "rather halting drama well-performed by the two young leads."

Chibnall and McFarlane in The British 'B' Film call the film a "neat, unpretentious thriller".
