= Vendetta (British TV series) =

British crime drama series (1966–1968)

- Genre: Drama
- Created by: Brian Degas; Tudor Gates
- Starring: Stelio Candelli; Neil McCallum; Kieron Moore
- Country of origin: United Kingdom
- Original language: English
- No. of series: 3
- No. of episodes: 36 (27 missing,1 incomplete)

Production
- Producers: William Slater; Anthony Coburn
- Running time: 50 minutes

Original release
- Network: BBC1
- Release: 4 November 1966 – 2 September 1968

Vendetta is a British crime drama series created by Brian Degas and Tudor Gates that aired from 1966 to 1968 on BBC1. The series stared Italian actor Stelio Candelli as ex-mafia man turned crime investigator, Danny Scipio and Canadian actor Neil McCallum as Scipio's partner, Angelo James.

== Cast ==
- Stelio Candelli as Danny Scipio
- Neil McCallum as Angelo James
- Kieron Moore as Mike Hammond

Guest stars include Jackie Trent, Penelope Keith, Linda Barrie, Steven Berkoff, Geoffrey Bayldon, George Cole, Kenneth Cope, Nicola Padgett, Keith Barron, Garfield Morgan, Roger Delgado, Barry Morse and Georgina Moon.

== Production ==
The series was based on an idea and format by writers Brian Degas and Tudor Gates. Location filming took place in Malta which stood in for foreign locations.

== Episodes ==
Series	Episodes	Originally released	
Series	Episodes	First released	Last released
1	13	4 November 1966	27 January 1967
2	13	21 June 1967	13 September 1967
3	10	1 July 1968	2 September 1968

=== Series 1 (1966–67) ===
No. overall	No. in series	Title	Original release date	Archive status
1	1	"The Sugar Man"	4 November 1966	Exists
2	2	"The Dolly Man"	11 November 1966	Missing
3	3	"The Widow Man"	18 November 1966	Incomplete
4	4	"The Lullaby Man"	25 November 1966	Missing
5	5	"The Kneeling Man"	2 December 1966	Exists
6	6	"The Putty Man"	9 December 1966	Exists
7	7	"The Ice-Cream Man"	16 December 1966	Missing
8	8	"The Concrete Man"	23 December 1966	Exists
9	9	"The Running Man"	30 December 1966	Exists
10	10	"The Chemical Man"	6 January 1967	Missing
11	11	"The Mourning Man"	13 January 1967	Missing
12	12	"The Mercy Man"	20 January 1967	Exists
13	13	"The Madonna Man"	27 January 1967	Missing

=== Series 2 (1967) ===
No. overall	No. in series	Title	Original release date	Archive status
14	1	"The Ten-Per-Cent Man"	21 June 1967	Missing
15	2	"The Holy Man"	28 June 1967	Missing
16	3	"The Lady's Man"	5 July 1967	Missing
17	4	"The Target Man"	12 July 1967	Missing
18	5	"The Suicide Man"	19 July 1967	Audio Exists
19	6	"The Button Man"	26 July 1967	Exists
20	7	"The Revolutionary Man"	2 August 1967	Missing
21	8	"The Pilgrim Man"	9 August 1967	Missing
22	9	"The Scandal Man"	16 August 1967	Missing
23	10	"The Desperate Man"	23 August 1967	Missing
24	11	"The Solitary Man"	30 August 1967	Missing
25	12	"The Honoured Man"	6 September 1967	Exists
26	13	"The Dying Man"	13 September 1967	Missing

=== Series 3 (1968) ===
No. overall	No. in series	Title	Original release date	Archive status
27	1	"The Saint Valentine's Man"	1 July 1968	Missing
28	2	"The Twelve-Year Old Man"	8 July 1968	Missing
29	3	"The Innocent Man"	15 July 1968	Exists
30	4	"The Hit and Run Man"	22 July 1968	Missing
31	5	"The Money Man"	29 July 1968	Missing
32	6	"The Paradise Man"	5 August 1968	Missing
33	7	"The Hollow Man"	12 August 1968	Missing
34	8	"The Blackfoot Man"	19 August 1968	Missing
35	9	"The Partisan Man"	26 August 1968	Missing
36	10	"The Anniversary Man"	2 September 1968	Missing

== Missing episodes ==
Out of 36 episodes, 27 are missing and 1 is incomplete, 1 episode has a surviving domestic audio recording. Of the 8 surviving episodes, 5 are from series 1, 2 are from series 2 and 1 is from series 3. Series 1, episode 5, “The Kneeling Man" exists on 16mm film when it was originally telerecorded onto 35mm film.
