= Holiday Affair =

1949 film by Don Hartman

- Theatrical release poster
- Directed by: Don Hartman
- Screenplay by: Isobel Lennart
- Based on: Christmas Gift; 1948 novelette by John D. Weaver
- Produced by: Don Hartman
- Starring: Robert Mitchum; Janet Leigh; Wendell Corey; Gordon Gebert
- Cinematography: Milton Krasner
- Edited by: Harry Marker
- Music by: Roy Webb
- Production company: RKO Radio Pictures
- Distributed by: RKO Radio Pictures
- Release dates: November 23, 1949 (New York City); December 24, 1949 (United States)
- Running time: 87 minutes
- Country: United States
- Language: English

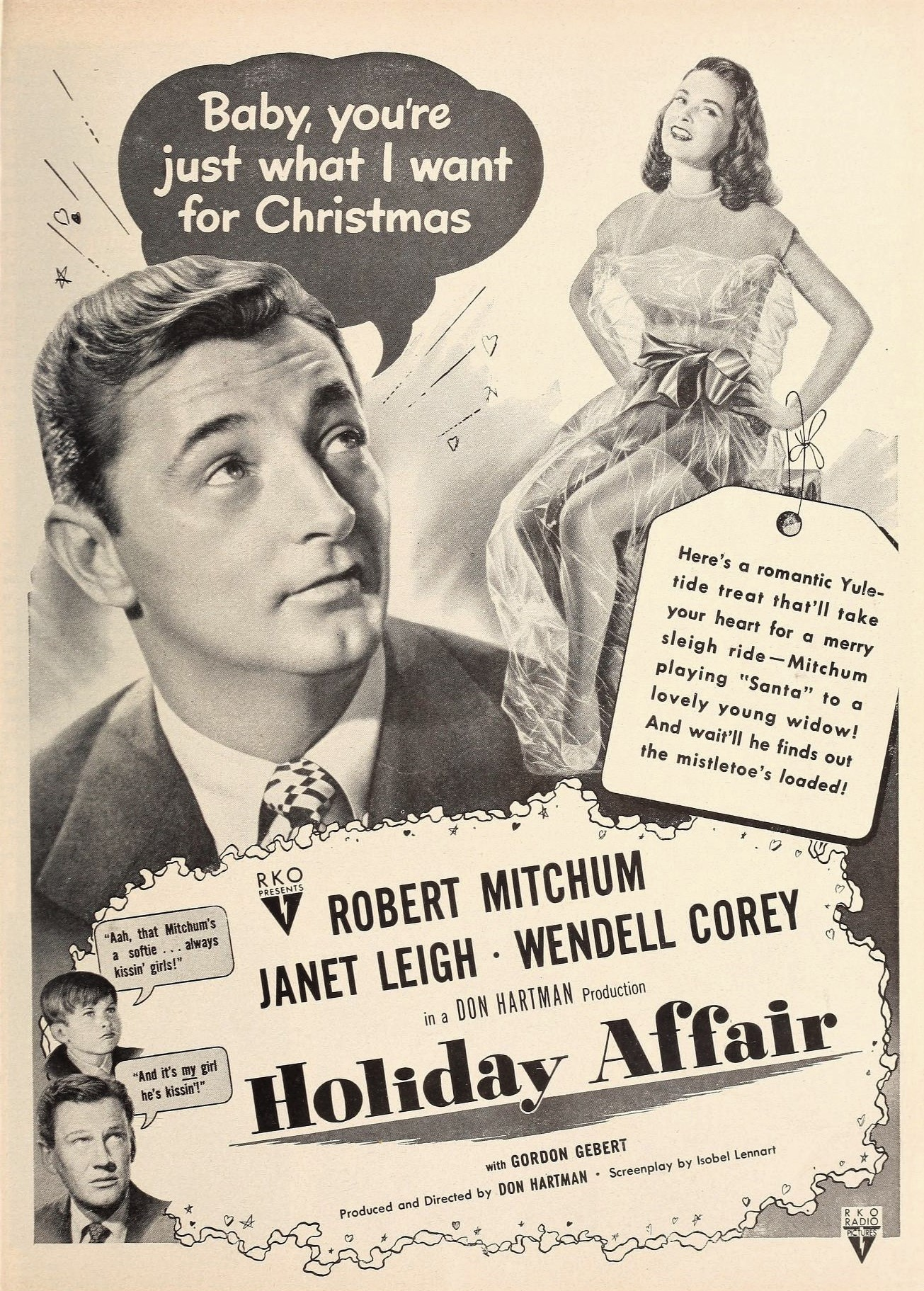
Advertisement in Modern Screen, January 1950

Holiday Affair is a 1949 American Christmas romantic comedy film produced and directed by Don Hartman and starring Robert Mitchum, Janet Leigh, and Wendell Corey, with Gordon Gebert. The screenplay by Isobel Lennart is based on John D. Weaver's story Christmas Gift, which was also the film's working title. The film allowed Mitchum to briefly depart from his typical roles in film noir, Western films and war films, and his casting was intended to help rehabilitate his image following a notorious marijuana bust. (Note: At the time, Mitchum was contracted to RKO Radio Pictures. According to Robert Osborne of Turner Classic Movies, RKO head Howard Hughes had Mitchum take the part to repair his image after his arrest for marijuana possession.)

A made-for-television remake, also titled Holiday Affair, was released in 1996.

== Plot ==
Steve Mason, a veteran seeking to go to Southern California to build sailboats, is employed as a salesman during the Christmas season at Crowley's, a New York department store. Connie Ennis is a comparative shopper for a rival store, and hurriedly buys an expensive toy train set from him without asking any questions about it. That night, her six-year-old son Timmy becomes excited when he peeks at what he thinks is his present, only to be disappointed when his mother tells him otherwise. Later, Connie's longtime steady suitor, lawyer Carl Davis, proposes to her, but she does not give him an immediate answer.

The next day, when Connie seeks a refund on the train set, Steve reveals he had suspected her all along and threatens to report her to the store detective. She explains that she is a war widow with a son to support. Sympathetic, Steve refunds her money, which gets him fired. Steve then takes Connie for lunch in Central Park and helps her complete her shopping. After they become separated in a crowd, Steve tracks down Connie and goes to her apartment with the rest of her packages, where he is introduced to Timmy and Carl. Steve and Carl share an awkward conversation, while Timmy takes an immediate liking to Steve.

Still upset about the train set, Timmy becomes belligerent with Carl. When Carl picks up Timmy, Connie yells at Carl to leave her son alone, prompting Carl to leave in frustration. Steve suggests that Connie is constantly trying to turn Timmy into the image of her late husband, upsetting Connie. Stopping by Timmy's room to say goodbye to him, Steve learns about the train set. Before leaving, Steve surprises Connie with a kiss. When Connie and Carl go out for dinner, she accepts his proposal.

On Christmas morning, Timmy discovers the train set outside the apartment door and assumes that his mother bought it for him after all. Realizing it was Steve's doing, Connie finds him in Central Park and tries to reimburse him. He refuses her money, as he wants to encourage Timmy to believe that sometimes dreams actually come true. When Connie reveals that she is marrying Carl on New Year's Day, Steve berates her for clinging to the past and not embracing the future. Annoyed, Connie leaves.

After Carl arrives at Connie's apartment, a policeman informs Connie that Steve has been arrested on suspicion of mugging a man in Central Park. With Carl and Timmy in tow, Connie heads to the police station and confirms that she was with Steve at the time of the robbery. Freed, Steve is invited to an uneasy Christmas dinner at the Ennis home, where he openly asks Connie to marry him instead of Carl. She asks him to leave. The next day, Timmy, having learned at the station that Steve is broke and unemployed, sneaks away to return the train set to get the money back to Steve. He eventually explains the situation to the store's owner, Mr. Crowley, who gives Timmy a refund and a ride home to his distraught mother.

Timmy gives Connie the refund money, and she and Carl drive to the rooming house where Steve is staying to give it to him. When Connie asks Carl to see Steve by himself, Carl presents the facts of the "divorce case" of Ennis versus Davis, from which he concludes that Connie does not love him. Connie then goes in alone, but is rebuffed by Steve, who declines to propose again, saying he cannot compete against her deceased husband. Connie bids Steve goodbye and leaves.

Later, as Connie prepares to go alone to a New Year's Eve party, Timmy tells her that when he gets married someday, she will be alone. After Connie reflects on her future, she and Timmy board the Midnight Special train to California, where they gleefully reunite with Steve.

== Cast ==
- Robert Mitchum as Steve Mason
- Janet Leigh as Connie Ennis
- Wendell Corey as Carl Davis
- Gordon Gebert as Timmy Ennis
- Griff Barnett as Mr. Ennis
- Esther Dale as Mrs. Ennis
- Henry O'Neill as Mr. Crowley
- Harry Morgan (credited as Henry Morgan) as police lieutenant
- Larry J. Blake as plainclothesman
- Helen Brown as Emily, Mr. Crowley's secretary
- Frances Morris as Mary, Connie's housekeeper (uncredited)

== Reception ==
The Brooklyn Eagle found it a "mildly pleasant, unpretentious romantic comedy...that strikes a vague but teasingly familiar note as it unfolds." After citing the New York setting around the Christmas holiday, and the importance of a large department store, the review said these would likely bring to mind Miracle on 34th Street (1947), with the film "wending an amiable but unimaginative way toward a foregone climax."

The film recorded a loss of $300,000.

== See also ==
- List of Christmas films
