= Esy Morales =

Puerto Rican musician (1916–1950)

Ismael “ Esy “Morales Sanabia
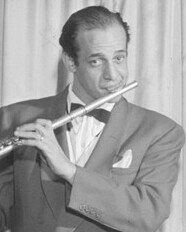
- Morales circa 1947

Background information
- Birth name: Ismael Morales Sanabia
- Born: March 3, 1916; Puerta de Tierra, San Juan, Puerto Rico
- Died: November 2, 1950 (aged 34); New York City, U.S.
- Occupation(s): Musician: percussionist, flautist and band director
- Years active: 1930–1950

Ismael "Esy" Morales (March 3, 1916 - November 2, 1950) was a Puerto Rican musician. His brothers, Humberto and Noro, were also musicians.

== Early life ==
Before the age of ten, Esy was performing on tenor sax, clarinet and flute. In 1930 he moved to New York City, and is credited on Xavier Cugat's album Cugat On Film, as well as other Cugat records. In the late 1930s he formed a band with his brothers Humberto and Noro.

== Career ==
Morales went on to form his own band, The Esy Morales Orchestra and had a cameo appearance in the 1949 motion picture Criss Cross performing the song "Jungle Fantasy". His name is also listed in the credits of this movie. He also performed in several other films. George Greeley recorded "Jungle Fantasy" on his 1966 Reprise Records single R-0490. The song Jungle Fantasy appears on Herbie Mann's 65th Birthday Celebration: Live At The Blue Note In New York City (Live), as well as Yusef Lateef's 1960 recording The Centaur and the Phoenix.

== Death ==
Morales died in 1950 at the age of 33 from a heart attack which was possibly brought on by diabetes. There was also an unconfirmed report that his death was the result of a cocaine overdose. He also became blind due to diabetes. He was about to re-sign with Rainbow Records, which had recorded his "Jungle Fantasy" a few years earlier. Morales recorded for Artistic, Manor, Caravan, and Decca under his own name.

== Filmography ==
Year	Title	Role	Notes
1949	Criss Cross	Orchestra Leader	
