= Dan Duryea =

American actor (1907–1968)

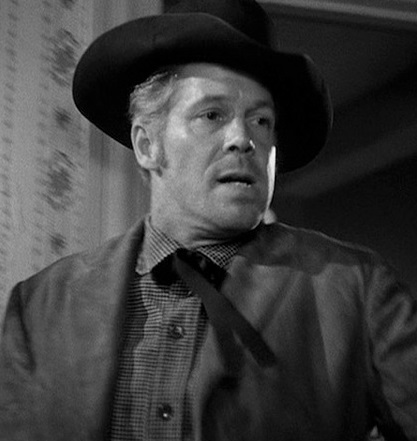
- Duryea as "Waco Johnny" Dean in Winchester '73 (1950)
- Born: January 23, 1907; White Plains, New York, U.S.
- Died: June 7, 1968 (aged 61); Los Angeles, California, U.S.
- Resting place: Forest Lawn Memorial Park Cemetery, Hollywood Hills, California
- Occupation: Actor
- Years active: 1933–1968
- Spouse: Helen Bryan Duryea (m. 1932; died 1967)
- Children: 2, including Peter Duryea

Dan Duryea (/ˈdʊri.eɪ/ DUR-ee-ay, January 23, 1907 – June 7, 1968) was an American actor in film, stage, and television. Known for portraying villains, he had a long career in leading and secondary roles.

== Early life ==
Duryea was born and raised in White Plains, New York. He graduated from White Plains High School in 1924 and Cornell University in 1928. While at Cornell, Duryea was elected into the Sphinx Head Society, Cornell's oldest senior honor society. He majored in English, and in his senior year succeeded Franchot Tone as president of the college drama society.

Because his parents did not approve of his choice of an acting career, Duryea became an advertising executive. After six years, he had a heart attack that sidelined him for a year.

== Acting career ==
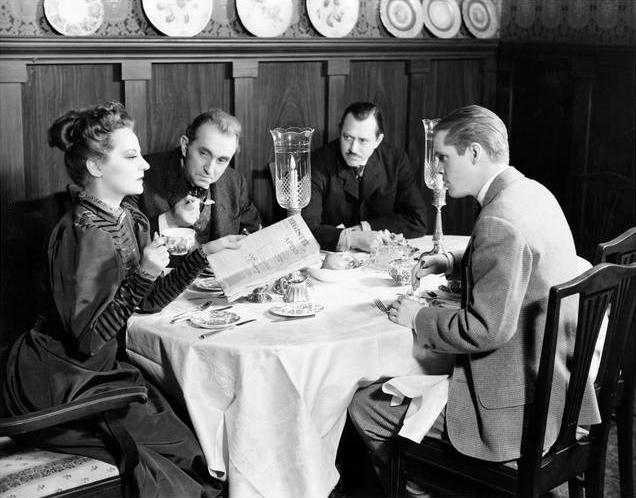
Tallulah Bankhead, Charles Dingle, Carl Benton Reid and Dan Duryea in the original Broadway production of The Little Foxes (1939)

=== Stage ===
Returning to his earlier love of acting and the stage, Duryea made his name on Broadway in the play Dead End, followed by The Little Foxes, in which he portrayed Leo Hubbard. He appeared on Broadway in Many Mansions (1937) and Missouri Legend (1938).

=== Film ===
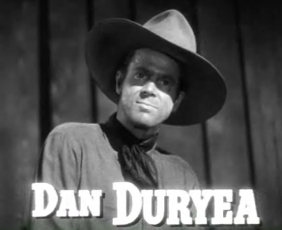
Trailer for Along Came Jones (1945)

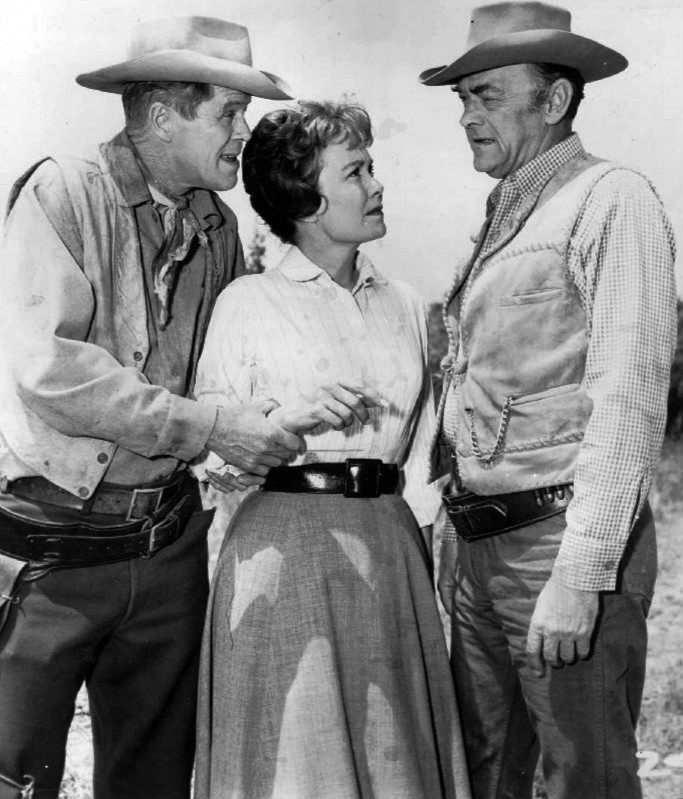
With Jane Wyman and John McIntire in television series Wagon Train (1962)

In 1940, Duryea moved to Hollywood to appear in the film version of The Little Foxes. He continued to establish himself with supporting and secondary roles in films such as The Pride of the Yankees (1942) and None But the Lonely Heart (1944). As the 1940s progressed, he found his niche as the "sniveling, deliberately taunting" antagonist in a number of films noir (Scarlet Street, The Woman in the Window, The Great Flamarion, Criss Cross, Too Late for Tears, Johnny Stool Pigeon), and Westerns such as Along Came Jones and Black Bart, although he was sometimes cast in more sympathetic roles (Black Angel, One Way Street). In 1946, exhibitors voted him the eighth most promising "star of tomorrow".

Duryea co-starred opposite Gary Cooper three times in the 1940s: Ball of Fire, Pride of the Yankees and Along Came Jones. In the 1950s, Duryea co-starred with James Stewart in three films, Winchester '73 (as the dastardly "Waco Johnny" Dean), Thunder Bay, and Night Passage. He was featured in several other westerns, including Silver Lode, Ride Clear of Diablo, and The Marauders, and in more film-noir productions like 36 Hours, Chicago Calling, Storm Fear, and The Burglar.

When interviewed by Hedda Hopper in the early 1950s, Duryea spoke of career goals and his preparation for roles:

Well, first of all, let's set the stage or goal I set for myself when I decided to become an actor ... not just 'an actor', but a successful one. I looked in the mirror and knew with my "puss" and 155-pound weakling body, I couldn't pass for a leading man, and I had to be different. And I sure had to be courageous, so I chose to be the meanest s.o.b. in the movies ... strictly against my mild nature, as I'm an ordinary, peace-loving husband and father. Inasmuch, as I admired fine actors like Richard Widmark, Victor Mature, Robert Mitchum, and others who had made their early marks in the dark, sordid, and guilt-ridden world of film noir; here, indeed, was a market for my talents. I thought the meaner I presented myself, the tougher I was with women, slapping them around in well-produced films where evil and death seem to lurk in every nightmare alley and behind every venetian blind in every seedy apartment, I could find a market for my screen characters.... At first it was very hard as I am a very even-tempered guy, but I used my past life experiences to motivate me as I thought about some of the people I hated in my early, as well as later, life ... like the school bully who used to try and beat the hell out of me at least once a week ... a sadistic family doctor that believed feeling pain when he treated you was the birthright of every man inasmuch as women suffered giving birth ... little incidents with trade-people who enjoyed acting superior because they owned their business, overcharging you. Then the one I used when I had to slap a woman around was easy! I was slapping the over-bearing teacher who would fail you in their 'holier-than-thou' class and enjoy it! And especially the experiences I had dealing with the unbelievable pompous 'know-it-all-experts' that I dealt with during my advertising agency days ... almost going 'nuts' trying to please these 'corporate heads' until I finally got out of that racket!"

In his last years, Duryea reteamed with Stewart for the adventure film The Flight of the Phoenix, about men stranded in the Sahara desert by a downed airplane, appearing as a mild-mannered accountant, closer to his real-life persona. He worked in overseas film productions including the British neo-noir thriller Do You Know This Voice? (1964), the Italian Western The Hills Run Red, aka Un Fiume di dollari, (1966) and the spy thriller Five Golden Dragons (1967) in West Germany, while continuing to find roles on American television. He appeared twice on the big screen with his son, character actor Peter Duryea, in the low-budget Westerns Taggart (1964) and The Bounty Killer (1965).

=== Television ===
Duryea starred as the lead character China Smith in the television series China Smith from 1952 to 1953 and The New Adventures of China Smith from 1954 to 1956.

He later guest-starred as Roy Budinger, the self-educated mastermind of a criminal ring dealing in silver bullion, in the episode "Terror Town" on October 18, 1958, of NBC's western series Cimarron City. On season 1, episode 15 of Wagon Train, he guest-starred as the title character in "The Cliff Grundy Story" (December 1957). He reappeared as Cliff, saving Robert Horton's Flint McCullough from being "Shanghaied" in S1 E39 "The Sacramento Story" which aired 6/24/1958.

In 1959, Duryea appeared as an alcoholic gunfighter in the third episode of The Twilight Zone, "Mr. Denton on Doomsday". He guest starred on NBC's anthology series The Barbara Stanwyck Show and appeared in an episode of Rawhide in 1959, "Incident Of The Executioner." On September 15, 1959, Duryea guest-starred as the outlaw Bud Carlin in the episode "Stage Stop", the premiere of NBC's Laramie western series. Duryea appeared again as Luke Gregg on Laramie on October 25, 1960, in the episode "The Long Riders". Duryea put in a comic performance in The Alfred Hitchcock Hour in an episode called "Three Wives Too Many" (1964).

Three weeks later, on November 16, 1960, Duryea played a mentally unstable pioneer obsessed by demons and superstitions in "The Bleymier Story" of NBC's Wagon Train. Elen Willard played his daughter; James Drury, his daughter's suitor. Duryea was cast twice in 1960 as Captain Brad Turner in consecutive episodes of the NBC western series Riverboat. He spoofed his tough-guy image in a comedy sketch about a robbery on the Dec. 4, 1960 episode of The Jack Benny Program. Duryea guest starred in a 1962 episode of Tales of Wells Fargo TV western series as Marshal Blake opposite Dale Robertson.

In 1963, Duryea portrayed Dr. Ben Lorrigan on NBC's medical drama, The Eleventh Hour. In 1967, a television version of Winchester '73 was released in which Duryea played the part of Bart McAdam, an uncle to Lin and Dakin McAdam. A notable co-star in the film was John Saxon (Dakin McAdam). From 1967 to 1968, he appeared in a recurring role as Eddie Jacks on the soap opera Peyton Place.

== Personal life and death ==
Duryea was different from the unsavory characters he often portrayed. He was married for 35 years to his wife, Helen, until her death in January 1967. The couple had two sons: Peter (who worked for a time as an actor), and Richard, a talent agent. At home, Duryea lived a quiet life at his house in the San Fernando Valley, devoting himself to gardening, boating, and community activities including, at various times, active membership in the local parent-teacher association and Scoutmaster of a Boy Scout troop.

Duryea died of esophageal cancer on June 7, 1968, at the age of 61. The New York Times noted the passing of a "heel with sex appeal." His remains are interred in Forest Lawn - Hollywood Hills Cemetery in Los Angeles.

There is a street named after Duryea in San Antonio, Texas.

== Filmography ==
Year	Film	Role	Director	Notes
1934	The Tango on Broadway	Laurita's Boyfriend	Louis J. Gasnier	uncredited
1941	The Little Foxes	Leo Hubbard	William Wyler	
1941	Ball of Fire	Duke Pastrami	Howard Hawks	
1942	The Pride of the Yankees	Hank Hanneman	Sam Wood	
1942	That Other Woman	Ralph Cobb	Ray McCarey	
1943	Sahara	Jimmy Doyle	Zoltán Korda	
1944	Man from Frisco	Jim Benson	Robert Florey	
1944	Mrs. Parkington	Jack Stilham	Tay Garnett	
1944	None But the Lonely Heart	Lew Tate	Clifford Odets	
1944	The Woman in the Window	Heidt / Tim, the Doorman	Fritz Lang	
1944	Ministry of Fear	Cost / Travers the Tailor	Fritz Lang	
1945	Main Street After Dark	Posey Dibson	Edward L. Cahn	
1945	The Great Flamarion	Al Wallace	Anthony Mann	
1945	The Valley of Decision	William Scott Jr.	Tay Garnett	
1945	Along Came Jones	Monte Jarrad	Stuart Heisler	
1945	Lady on a Train	Arnold Waring	Charles David	
1945	Scarlet Street	Johnny Prince	Fritz Lang	
1946	Black Angel	Martin Blair	Roy William Neill	
1946	White Tie and Tails	Charles Dumont	Charles Barton	
1948	Black Bart	Charles E. Boles / Black Bart	George Sherman	
1948	River Lady	Beauvais	George Sherman	
1948	Another Part of the Forest	Oscar Hubbard	Michael Gordon	
1948	Larceny	Silky Randall	George Sherman	
1949	Criss Cross	Slim Dundee	Robert Siodmak	
1949	Manhandled	Karl Benson	Lewis R. Foster	
1949	Too Late for Tears	Danny Fuller	Byron Haskin	
1949	Johnny Stool Pigeon	Johnny Evans	William Castle	
1950	One Way Street	John Wheeler	Hugo Fregonese	
1950	Winchester '73	Waco Johnny Dean	Anthony Mann	
1950	The Underworld Story	Mike Reese	Cy Endfield	
1951	Chicago Calling	William R. Cannon	John Reinhardt	
1951	Al Jennings of Oklahoma	Al Jennings	Ray Nazarro	
1953	Thunder Bay	Gambi	Anthony Mann	
1953	Sky Commando	Colonel Ed (E.D.) Wyatt	Fred F. Sears	
1953	Terror Street	Major Bill Rogers		
1954	World for Ransom	Mike Callahan / Corrigan	Robert Aldrich (uncredited)	
1954	Ride Clear of Diablo	Whitey Kincade	Jesse Hibbs	
1954	Rails Into Laramie	Jim Shanessy	Jesse Hibbs	
1954	Silver Lode	Fred McCarty	Allan Dwan	
1954	This Is My Love	Murray Myer	Stuart Heisler	
1955	Foxfire	Hugh Slater	Joseph Pevney	
1955	The Marauders	Avery	Gerald Mayer	
1955	Storm Fear	Fred Blake	Cornel Wilde	
1956	Battle Hymn	Sergeant Herman	Douglas Sirk	
1957	The Burglar	Nat Harbin	Paul Wendkos	
1957	Night Passage	Whitey Harbin	James Neilson	
1957	Slaughter on Tenth Avenue	John Jacob Masters	Arnold Laven	
1958	Kathy O'	Harry Johnson	Jack Sher	
1960	Platinum High School	Major Redfern Kelly	Charles Haas	
1962	Six Black Horses	Frank Jesse	Harry Keller	
1965	Daniel Boone	Simon Perigore		
1964	He Rides Tall	Bart Thorne	R. G. Springsteen	
1964	Do You Know This Voice?	John Hopta		
1964	Walk a Tightrope	Carl Lutcher	Frank Nesbitt	
1964	Taggart	Jay Jason	R. G. Springsteen	
1965	The Bounty Killer	Willie Duggan	Spencer Gordon Bennet	
1965	The Flight of the Phoenix	Standish	Robert Aldrich	
1966	Incident at Phantom Hill	Joe Barlow	Earl Bellamy	
1966	The Hills Run Red	Colonel Winny Getz		
1967	Winchester '73	Bart McAdam		TV Movie
1967	Five Golden Dragons	Dragon #1	Jeremy Summers	
1967	Stranger on the Run	O.E. Hotchkiss	Don Siegel	TV Movie
1968	The Bamboo Saucer	Hank Peters	Frank Telford	Filmed in 1966, released posthumously; final film role

== Partial television appearances ==
- Kate Smith Kate Smith Hour, Live TV, January 16, 1952. Stars in a one act play, "Land's End".
- China Smith (1952–1953) (26 episodes) as China Smith
- The New Adventures of China Smith (1954–1956) (26 episodes) as China Smith
- Schlitz Playhouse of Stars (1952–1958) (5 episodes) as China Smith / Federal Agent Sam Ireland / Pete Richards
- December Bride (1955) (Episode: "High Sierras") as himself
- Wagon Train (1957–1964) (7 episodes) as Sam Race / Amos / Samuel Bleymier / Joshua Gilliam / Survivor / Cliff Grundy
- Zane Grey Theater (1958) (Season 2 Episode 16: "This Man Must Die") as Kirk Joiner
- Laramie (1959) (Season 1 Episode 1: "Stage Stop") as Bud Carlin
- Walt Disney's Wonderful World of Color (1959) (Season 5 Episode 15: "Texas John Slaughter: Showdown at Sandoval") as Dan Trask
- The Twilight Zone (1959) (Season 1 Episode 3: "Mr. Denton on Doomsday") as Al Denton
- Rawhide (1959) (Season 1 Episode 3: "Incident with an Executioner") as Jardin
- Laramie (1960) (Season 2 Episode 6: "The Long Riders") as Luke Gregg
- Bonanza (1960) (Season 2 Episode 3: "Badge Without Honor") as U.S. Dep. Marshall Gerald Eskith
- Route 66 (1961) (Season 1 Episode 24: "Don't Count Stars") as Mike McKay
- Zane Grey Theater (1961) (Season 5 Episode 22: "Knight of the Sun") as Henry Jacob Hanley
- Laramie (1961) (Season 3 Episode 4: "The Mountain Men") as Ben Sanford
- Naked City (1962) (Season 4 Episode 3: "Daughter, Am I In My Father's House?") as Clyde Royd
- Tales of Wells Fargo (1962) (Season 6 Episode 23: "Winter Storm") as Marshal Blake
- Going My Way (1962) (Season 1 Episode 9: "Mr. Second Chance") as Harold Harrison
- Rawhide (1962) (Season 5 Episode 9: "Incident of the Wolvers") as Abner Cannon
- Rawhide (1963) (Season 6 Episode 9: "Incident of Prophecy") as Brother William
- Route 66 (1963) (Season 4 Episode 9: "A Cage in Search of a Bird") as Jay Leonard Ringsby
- Bonanza (1964) (Season 6 Episode 5: "Logan's Treasure") as Sam Logan
- The Alfred Hitchcock Hour (1964) (Season 2 Episode 12: "Three Wives Too Many") as Raymond Brown
- Combat! (TV series) (1965) (Season 3 Episode 23: "Dateline") as Barton
- The Virginian (1966) (Season 5 Episode 6: "The Challenge") as Ben Crayton
- Combat! (TV series) (1967) (Season 5 Episode 22: "A Little Jazz") as Bernie Wallace
- Peyton Place (1967–1968) (60 episodes) as Eddie Jacks

== Radio performances ==
- Suspense, "The Man Who Couldn't Lose" (1947)
- Suspense, "The Man from Homicide" (1951)
- Suspense, "Remember Me" (1952)
