= Museum Piece =

Episode of the British sitcom Dad's Army

- Dad's Army episode
- Episode no.: Series 1 Episode 2
- Directed by: David Croft
- Written by: Jimmy Perry; David Croft
- Original air date: 7 August 1968
- Running time: 30 minutes

Guest appearances
- Janet Davies as Mrs Pike; Caroline Dowdeswell as Janet King; Leon Cortez as Henry, the Milkman; Eric Woodburn as George Jones, the Museum Caretaker; Michael Osborne as Boy Scout

Episode chronology
← Previous "The Man and the Hour"	Next → "Command Decision"

"Museum Piece" is the second episode of the first series of the British television sitcom Dad's Army. It was first broadcast on 7 August 1968.

== Synopsis ==
Mainwaring and Wilson come up with an idea for getting the platoon some much-needed weapons: "Operation Gun Grab". The plan is to requisition any firearms from the local museum of Historic Army Weapons – but to do so, the platoon must first find a way to outwit the old caretaker, who happens to be Lance Corporal Jones's father.

== Plot ==
The platoon has recently had its first parade, and Mainwaring and Wilson, in their bank, discuss a recent exercise which involved crossing river via a "demolished bridge". However, Pike fell in, flat on his face. Mainwaring confides in Wilson that he does not think he has the unthinking obedience required to make an efficient fighting unit, and is sure that one of his men told him to "get stuffed".

Wilson asks Mainwaring about the weapons situation, and Mainwaring reluctantly informs him that it will be a further six weeks before the weapons and uniforms arrive, so they must make do with one shotgun, seventeen carving knives, Jones' assegai, and Bracewell's number three iron. They receive a letter from the Peabody Museum of Historical Army Weapons, informing them that they will have to close their account for the duration because the curator has joined the navy. Mainwaring's ears prick up at the name of the museum, and deduces they might be able to use some equipment that could be used by his Local Defence Volunteers. Wilson is not so sure, but Mainwaring organises "Operation Gun Grab", and tells Miss King to write a letter to give to the caretaker in charge.

On parade, Jones informs Mainwaring that he will not be able to get anything from the museum, because the caretaker is Jones' 88-year-old father. True to form, the cantankerous old man refuses to let the platoon in, so they decide to try force, using scaling ladders and battering rams, but to no avail. When they try to scale the museum, George Jones puts a damper on their plans by soaking them in cold water. Back at the church, Mainwaring decides to take a more tactical approach: Frazer, who will be disguised as an ARP Warden, will tell Mr. Jones that he is shining a light, and will use bottle of whisky provided by Walker to tempt him with if he does not respond. The men will then sneak into the museum while Mr. Jones is outside to look for weapons. Pike also introduces a boy scout who has brought along a cart to carry the weapons with.

All goes well, and the platoon successfully get into the museum. Jones finds several halberds and a breastplate, Pike and Walker find an elephant-shooting musket, and Godfrey finds a case of .303 carbines, which are being used by ENSA. The platoon prepares to leave defeated, until Jones and Walker find a Chinese rocket gun, and wheel it back to the church hall, where the boy scout is asked by Walker to try to get it going. Mainwaring calls the duo over and says that he praises their initiative, but the weapon is too antiquated even for them. As they prepare to make petrol bombs, the boy scout gets the weapon working, and it fires rockets everywhere.

== Cast ==
- Arthur Lowe as Captain Mainwaring
- John Le Mesurier as Sergeant Wilson
- Clive Dunn as Lance Corporal Jones
- John Laurie as Private Frazer
- James Beck as Private Walker
- Arnold Ridley as Private Godfrey
- Ian Lavender as Private Pike
- Janet Davies as Mrs Pike
- Caroline Dowdeswell as Janet King
- Leon Cortez as Henry, the Milkman
- Eric Woodburn as George Jones, the Museum Caretaker
- Michael Osborne as Boy Scout

== Production ==
The exterior scenes at the museum were filmed at Oxburgh Hall, a National Trust property in Norfolk, while studio filming took place on 22 April 1968 at the BBC Television Centre.

This episode was originally planned to air on 12 June 1968. An estimated 6.8 million viewers watched this episode.
