= Operation Stogie =

1962 British film by Ernest Morris

- Theatrical release poster
- Directed by: Ernest Morris
- Written by: M.M. McCormack
- Produced by: Edward J. Danziger; Harry Lee Danziger
- Starring: John Hewer; Anton Rogers
- Cinematography: Jimmy Wilson
- Edited by: John Dunsford
- Music by: Bill LeSage
- Release date: 1962
- Running time: 75 minutes
- Country: United Kingdom
- Language: English

Operation Stogie is a 1962 British comedy film directed by Ernest Morris and starring John Hewer, Anton Rogers and Susan Stephen. It was written by M.M. McCormack and produced by The Danzigers.

== Plot ==
General Tankard visits Scattershot, an Officer Cadet Training Centre commanded by Major Soames, to inform him that the army is on a new efficiency drive and wants to reduce the number of cadets that can graduate. Major Soames therefore devises a set of initiative tests that each cadet must pass, or be thrown off the course. Cadets Ted and Jock are particularly slippery customers, so Major Soames sets them an outrageous and seemingly impossible task – codenamed "Operation Stogie" – to prove their suitability for officer training. They must find a way to attend an elite party – a party so exclusive that even the Prime Minister can't get an invite – to be held at the ultra-posh Cormorant Manor. Further, they must prove their attendance with a photograph of each of them with their arm around Lady Cormorant. And, as if that were not already a difficult enough task, Lady Cormorant must be smoking a cigar when the photo is taken. Ted and Jock accept the challenge and successfully complete their operation with cunning and military precision.

== Cast ==
- John Hewer as Ted
- Anton Rogers as Jock
- Susan Stephen as Stella
- Richard Caldicott as Lord Cormorant
- Mona Washbourne as Lady Cormorant
- Austin Trevor as General Tankard
- Ferdy Mayne as Sultan
- Peter Illing as Dr Polk
- Inia Wiata as Emir
- Julian Orchard as Major Soames
- Leon Cortez as George
- Anthony Woodruff as Prosecuting Officer
- Valentyne Dyall as Presiding Officer
- Richard Bennett as first NCO
- Richard Carpenter as second NCO
- Larry Noble as tramp

== Production ==
Filming started at New Elstree Studios on 7 October 1960.
