= Giles Cooper Entertainment =

UK concert promoter (est. 2016)

Giles Cooper Entertainment Ltd
- Industry: Concert Promoters and Show Producers
- Founded: 2016
- Founder: Giles Cooper
- Headquarters: London, United Kingdom
- Area served: Europe
- Website: gcelive.com

Giles Cooper Entertainment (GCE Live) is a concert promoting company, producing tours and hundreds of shows for music, comedy and theatre throughout the UK. GCE Live also presents and produces outdoor concerts in the grounds of English Heritage and other stately homes such as Kenwood House on London’s Hampstead Heath and Audley End House and Gardens in Saffron Walden, Essex.

== Founders ==
Giles Cooper, the company's founder, also serves as Chairman of the Royal Variety Charity and an Executive Producer of the Royal Variety Performance, a role he was elected to in 2010. The Royal Variety Charity is a UK entertainment industry charity with Queen Elizabeth II as its patron.

Giles Cooper was also awarded:

- Fellow of the Royal Society of Arts, 2006.
- Freedom of the City of London, 2014.

== Artists performing at GCE events ==
GCE Live has promoted tours and produced shows for artists, including bands such as Placebo and the Happy Mondays and theatre and spoken-word tours for BBC TV presenters such as Simon Reeve and Dan Snow.

They have produced shows for artists such as Kris Kristofferson, Alfie Boe, Hacienda Classical, Orbital and Leftfield, José Carreras, the Human League and, ABC and the Jacksons.

These include the well-known artists listed below:

- Jess Glynne
- Rudimental
- Madness
- The Jacksons
- The Hives
- José Carreras
- Kris Kristofferson
- Alfie Boe
- Placebo
- Happy Mondays
- The Human League
- Simon Reeve
