= Brinsworth House =

Home for retired entertainers in west London, England

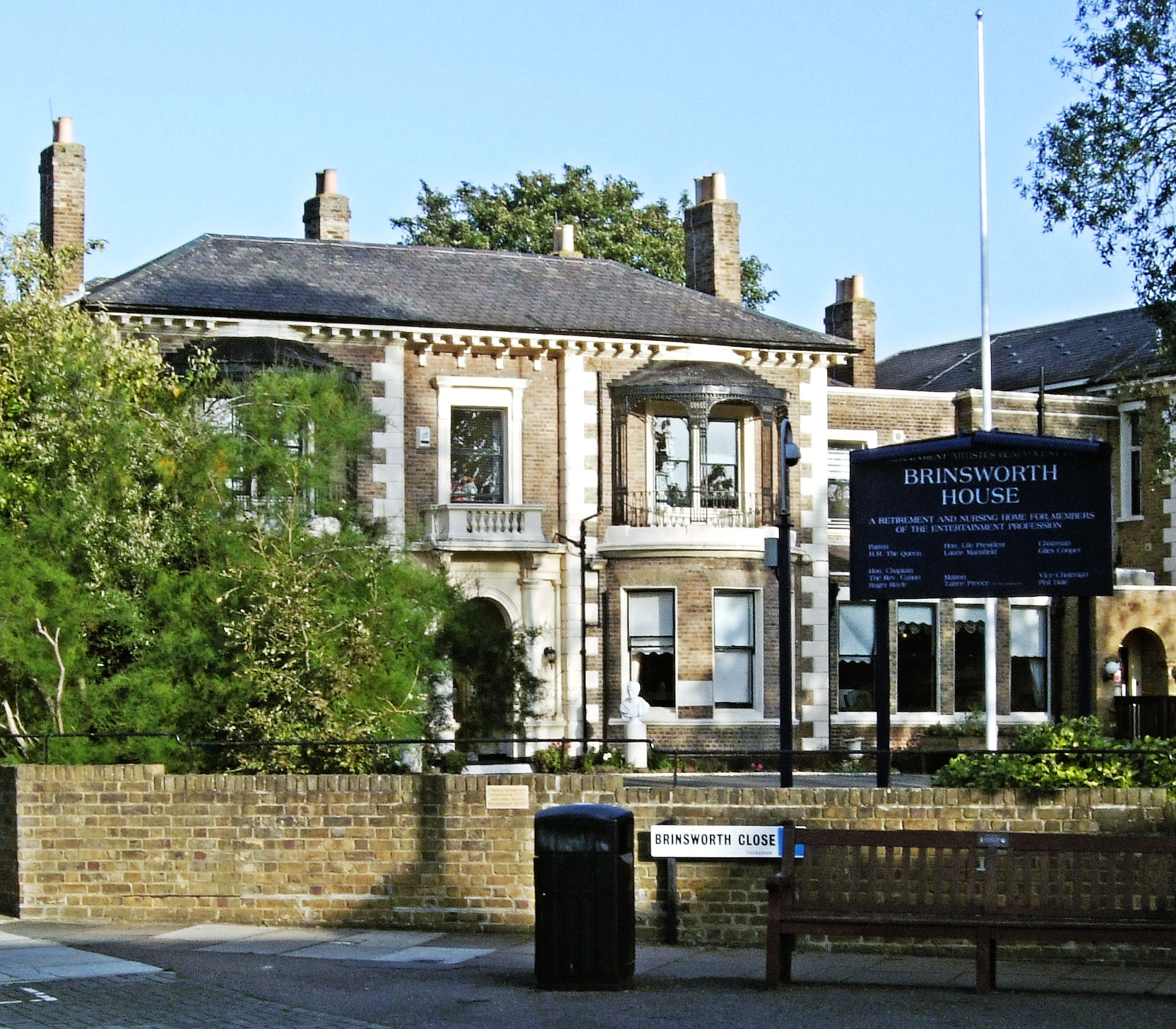
- The building in October 2014
- Interactive map of the Brinsworth House area

General information
- Location: 72 Staines Road, Twickenham, London, England
- Coordinates: 51.4439°N 0.3492°W
- Owner: Royal Variety Charity

Brinsworth House is an English residential and nursing retirement home for theatre and entertainment professionals on Staines Road, Twickenham, in the London Borough of Richmond upon Thames. The house is owned and run by the Royal Variety Charity and has 36 bedrooms, six living rooms, a library, an in-house bar and stage, and a staff of 64. It is set in five acres (two hectares) of land.

== History ==
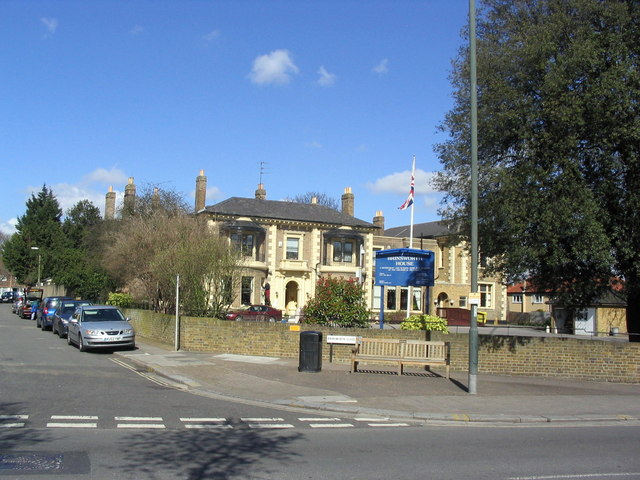
Brinsworth House in March 2007

Brinsworth House was built in 1850 and opened as a retirement home in 1911.

The theatre architect Frank Matcham, in 1912, designed a wing at the house free of charge in aid of the fund. Work commenced in June and was completed in October.

The house is owned and maintained by the Royal Variety Charity, which was founded in 1908 to care for members of, what was at that time, the variety and music hall profession. The charity and the house are funded by the Royal Variety Performance, by voluntary donations and, since 2007, by part-proceeds from phone voting from ITV Network's Britain's Got Talent.

== Residents ==
Previous celebrity residents have included:

- Hylda Baker (died 1986)
- Penny Calvert (died 2014), dancer and first wife of Sir Bruce Forsyth
- Pearl Carr (died 2020)
- Derek Cooper (died 2014), journalist, broadcaster and food specialist
- Charlie Drake (died 2006)
- Roy Fox (died 1982), British dance band leader
- Alan Freeman (died 2006)
- Mona Hammond (died 2022)
- John Hewer (died 2008), best known for his role as Captain Birdseye
- Dame Thora Hird (died 2003)
- Renée Houston (died 1980)
- Teddy Johnson (died 2018)
- Kathy Kirby (died 2011)
- Mick McManus (died 2013)
- Richard O'Sullivan (died 2026)
- Alf Pearson (died 2012)
- Emily Perry (died 2008)
- Ronnie Ronalde (died 2015), music hall singer and siffleur
- Ben Warriss (died 1993)
- Jack Wilson (died 1970), of Wilson, Keppel and Betty fame
- Mike Yarwood (died 2023)

== See also ==
- Denville Hall – retirement home for actors
