= Paul Tabori =

Hungarian writer (1908–1974)

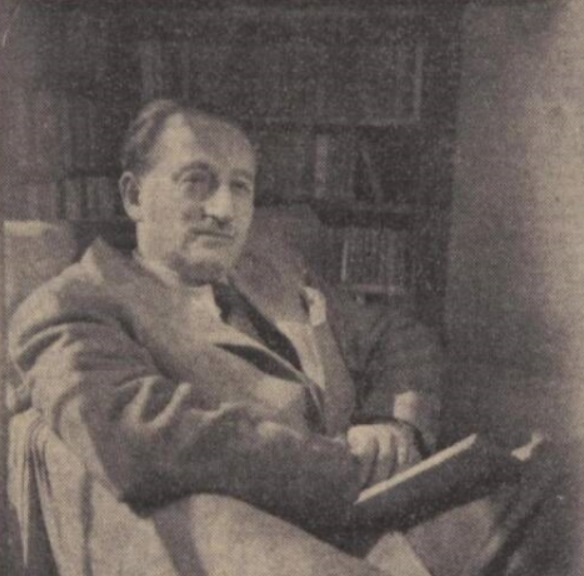
- Paul Tabori
- Born: Pál Tábori; 16 November 1908; Budapest, Hungary
- Died: 9 November 1974 (aged 65); London, United Kingdom
- Occupations: Author, journalist, screenwriter, psychoanalyst
- Writing career
- Pen name: Peter Stafford, Christopher Stevens
- Language: English

Pál Tábori (16 November 1908 – 9 November 1974), also known as Paul Tabori, and by his pen names Paul Stafford and Christopher Stevens, was a Hungarian-born author, journalist, screenwriter and psychoanalyst. He was known for his diverse range of writings, which covered a wide array of topics including history, psychology, popular science, and fiction. Tabori's works were often characterized by his engaging writing style and his ability to make complex subjects accessible to a broad audience.

== Life ==
Pál Tabori was born on 16 November 1908, in Budapest, Hungary, the son of the journalist Cornelius Tabori and Elsa, née Ziffer. George Tabori was his younger brother. Tabori grew up in a bilingual and cultured Jewish family. He studied in Vienna and Berlin, where he earned a Ph.D. in psychology. Tabori's background in psychology influenced his later writings, particularly his interest in the human mind and behavior.

In the 1930s, Tabori worked as a journalist and editor in Berlin. However, due to the rise of Nazi Germany and the increasing persecution of Jews, he was forced to flee the country. He settled in England in 1937, initially working as a journalist for the Daily Mail and the BBC. He became a British citizen in 1947.

Tabori's literary career took off in the 1950s and 1960s. He authored numerous books that explored a wide range of subjects. Some of his notable works include The Anatomy of Exile, which examined the experiences of refugees and exiles, and The Natural Science of Stupidity, a lighthearted exploration of human folly. He also wrote several historical works, such as The Byzantine Background to the First Crusade and The Sultan's Fool, a biography of a Hungarian traveler in the Ottoman Empire.

Additionally, Tabori wrote novels, plays and screenplays. His novel The Green Rain dealt with the Holocaust, reflecting his personal history and experiences. Tabori also adapted the works of other authors for the stage, including the plays of Franz Kafka.

In addition to his writing career, Tabori practiced as a psychoanalyst and was a member of the British Psychoanalytical Society.

Tabori founded the International Writers Guild, and was active in PEN International.

Paul Tabori died in London on 9 November 1974.

== Works ==
=== Fiction ===
- Private Gallery. A Collection of Stories (1944)
- Le Soleil de ma Nuit (1947)
- Broken Sleep (1947)
- Solo (1948)
- The Green Rain (1951)
- The Art of Folly (1956)
- The Sultan's Fool (1953)
- A Shadow on the Sun (1954)
- The Tortoise Shell (1956)
- The Sinner (1957)
- The Violins of Saint-Jacques (1958)
- Gideon (1958)
- The Survivors (1964)
- The Puppet Show (1967)
- The Sinner and the Amnesiac (1969)
- The Demons of Sandorra (1970)
- The Last Waltz in Vienna (1971)
- Strangers in the Land (1975, posthumously published)

=== Non-fiction ===
- Epitaph for Europe (1943)
- The Anatomy of Exile (1945)
- Harry Price, Biography of a Ghost Hunter (1950)
- The Natural Science of Stupidity (1951)
- The Byzantine Background to the First Crusade (1951)
- The Anatomy of Grief (1961)
- Eva Braun: Hitler's Mistress (1961)
- The Devil and the Jews: The Medieval Conception of the Jew and Its Relation to Modern Anti-Semitism (1961)
- Secret Army: The Story of the SOE (1962)
- The Forgery (1965)
- Legacy of Silence (1965)
- The Great Betrayal: The Story of Burgess and Maclean (1967)
- Dress and Undress (1969)
- The Anatomy of Power (1969)
- The Social History of Rape (1971)
- The Nuremberg Mendacity (1972)
- Ghosts of Borley: Annals of the Haunted Rectory (with Peter Underwood) (1973)
- The Hump (1973)
- The Moral Disaster (1973)
- The Rape of Palestine (1974)
- The Jew and the Enemy: How Jacob Obermayer Saved the World (1975, posthumously published)
- Before Our Time: A Memoir of Hungary (1978, posthumously published)

=== Film screenwriting ===
- Valley of Eagles (1951), co-writer
- Gilbert Harding Speaking of Murder (1953)
- Four Sided Triangle (1953), co-writer
- Mantrap (1953), co-writer
- Spaceways by (1953), co-writer
- Diplomatic Passport (1954)
- Star of My Night (1954)
- Five Days (1954)
- Alias John Preston (1956)
- Morning Call (1957), co-writer
- Continental Nights, (1958, short), co-producer
- The Young Jacobites (1959)
- The Malpas Mystery (1961), co-writer
- Doomsday at Eleven (1962)
- Strip Tease Murder (1963)

=== Television screenwriting ===
- "Dr. Damon's Experiment", The Vise, S1E3 (1954)
- "Gabriel's Choice", The Vise. S1E6 (1954), co-writer
- "The Diamond Expert", The Vise, S1E7 (1954)
- "The Very Silent Traveller", The Vise, S1E11 (1954)
- "Lucky Man" , The Vise, S1E13 (1954)
- "The Gamblers", The Vise, S1E14 (1954), co-writer
- The Stolen Crime", Colonel March of Scotland Yard, S1E16 (1954)
- "A Tale of Three Women", Adventure Theatre (1954)
- "The Treasure of Urbano", Douglas Fairbanks Presents, S3E28 (1955)
- "Blind Man's Bluff", The Vise. S1E18 (1955)
- "Death on the Boards", The Vise. S1E21(1955)
- "The Cruel Test", The Vise. S1E24 (1955)
- "Double Pay-off", The Vise. S1E31 (1955)
- "The Homing Chinaman", The Vise, S1E36 (1955)
- "Murder of a 'ham'", The Vise. S1E38 (1955)
- "The Better Chance Story", The Vise. S1E39 (1955)
- "The Sealed Room", The Errol Flynn Theatre, S1E15 (1956)
- "Farewell Performance", The Errol Flynn Theatre S1E17 (1956)
- "The Thief of London", Adventure Theatre .S1E5 (1956)
- "The Cellini Cup", The Errol Flynn Theatre, S1E25 (1957)
- The Taxi Story",The New Adventures of Martin Kane (1957)
- "Long Live the King", Richard the Lionheart. S1E1 (1961)
- "The Lion and the Eagle", Richard the Lionheart, S1E2 (1961)
- "The Robbers of Ashdown Forest", Richard the Lionheart, S1E3 (1961)
- "The Wolf of Banbury", Richard the Lionheart, S1E4 (1961)
- "Crown in Danger", Richard the Lionheart, S1E6 (1962)
- "The Alchemist of Rouen", Richard the Lionheart, S1E8 (1961)
- "The King's Champion", Richard the Lionheart, S1E9 (1962)
- "King Arthur's Sword", Richard the Lionheart, S1E10 (1962)
- "The Great Enterprise", Richard the Lionheart, S1E14 (1962)
- The Reluctant Duchess", Sir Francis Drake, E21 (1962), co-writer
- "The Bride", Richard the Lionheart (1962)
- "School for a King", Richard the Lionheart (1962)
- "The Challenge", Richard the Lionheart (1962)
- "The Child of Eve", Man From Interpol, S1E37 (1961)
- "Danger, Keep Out", Beware of the Dog, S1E1 (1963)
- "The Dog Catchers", Beware of the Dog, S1E2 (1963)
- "The Rescue", Beware of the Dog, S1E3 (1963)
- "The Fugitives", Beware of the Dog, S1E4 (1963)
- "The Dog Prison", Beware of the Dog, S1E5 (1963)
- "The Battle", Beware of the Dog, S1E6 (1963)
