= The Enemy Within the Gates =

Episode of the British sitcom Dad's Army

- Dad's Army episode
- Episode no.: Series 1 Episode 4
- Directed by: David Croft
- Story by: Jimmy Perry and David Croft
- Original air date: 28 August 1968
- Running time: 30 minutes

Episode chronology
← Previous "Command Decision"	Next → "The Showing Up of Corporal Jones"

"The Enemy Within the Gates" is the fourth episode of the first series of the British comedy series Dad's Army. It was originally transmitted on Wednesday 28 August 1968, one week later than planned, due to the Warsaw Pact Invasion of Czechoslovakia.

== Synopsis ==
Captain Mainwaring's men receive news that a £10 reward will be given for every Nazi arrested.

== Plot ==
At the bank, Pike informs Mainwaring that the platoon's new uniforms have arrived. Unfortunately, they appear to be too small, but this is soon explained when Mainwaring gets a phone call saying that the uniforms they were given are actually meant for the ATS.

At the church hall, however, the men at least have been given their forage caps. Mainwaring informs them that any Nazis who parachute into Walmington could be well disguised, even as British officers. At that moment, a stranger with a suspicious foreign accent in a British uniform enters. Upon being interrogated, he explains that he is Captain Winogrodzki of the Polish Forces, and tells the men that there will be a reward of £10 for every live parachutist captured.

That night, Jones, Walker and Pike are out on patrol. After bumping into Winogrodzki, who rudely lectures them for slacking, they hear a dogfight overhead and spot something white floating down towards them. Pike shoots it, but it turns out to be a swan. However, as they go to hide it, two German airmen appear, and the men quickly capture them and take them to the church.

Mainwaring is pleased with the men for what they have done, but when he goes to phone GHQ, he finds the line dead, due to the vicar being unable to pay the phone bill as Wilson explains. After Jones goes to phone them from his shop, Mainwaring and the others go to question the prisoners but find them gone. Pike says that they had to relieve themselves and Godfrey went with them. Godfrey returns alone and gives a long complicated explanation of how the prisoners managed to give him the slip. Fortunately, Winogrodzki arrives, having found the prisoners, and berates Mainwaring for the platoon's incompetence and declares he will claim the £10 bounty himself.

However, when the MPs arrive for the prisoners, they grow suspicious of Winogrodzki and, under Walker's influence, arrest him as well. Thus, the platoon have earned £30 instead of the expected 20. Despite the confusion, Mainwaring decides to spend it on a celebration dinner, with Walker offering to provide them with roast swan (made from the one he and the others had shot dead earlier).

== Cast ==
- Arthur Lowe as Captain Mainwaring
- John Le Mesurier as Sergeant Wilson
- Clive Dunn as Lance Corporal Jones
- John Laurie as Private Frazer
- James Beck as Private Walker
- Arnold Ridley as Private Godfrey
- Ian Lavender as Private Pike
- Caroline Dowdeswell as Janet King
- Carl Jaffe as Captain Winogrodzki
- Denys Peeks as German pilot
- Nigel Rideout as German pilot
- Bill Pertwee as ARP Warden Hodges
- David Davenport as Military Police Sergeant

== Radio episode ==
In the radio version of the episode, only one German airman is captured and only £20 bounty is due after Walker persuades the MPs to additionally take Winogrodzki.

== Notes ==
1. Nigel Rideout was given an extra £10 for writing the German dialogue in the script.
2. The episode was scheduled originally to be broadcast on 21 August 1968. However, the BBC replaced it with a documentary on the Hungarian uprising, due to the Warsaw Pact invasion of Czechoslovakia.
