= Command Decision (Dad's Army) =

Episode of the British sitcom Dad's Army

- Dad's Army episode
- Episode no.: Series 1 Episode 3
- Directed by: David Croft
- Story by: Jimmy Perry and David Croft
- Original air date: 14 August 1968
- Running time: 30 minutes

Episode chronology
← Previous "Museum Piece"	Next → "The Enemy Within the Gates"

"Command Decision" is the third episode of the first series of the British comedy series Dad's Army. It was originally transmitted on Wednesday 14 August 1968. The episode was recorded on 29 April 1968. The episode was directed and produced by David Croft, with a story by Jimmy Perry and David Croft

== Synopsis ==
Leadership agrees with Captain Mainwairing, but the men, still without uniforms and arms, are getting restless. Their fortunes take a turn when old campaigner Colonel Square arrives with an offer of rifles and horses. There is a catch; to secure the weapons, Mainwaring must hand over command to Colonel Square.

== Plot ==
The platoon are all feeling blue due to their lack of rifles. In a rather rash bid to raise spirits, Mainwaring promises them some before the week is out, but time is running short. He is then visited by a member of the local gentry called Colonel Square, who reveals that he has got rifles which he is willing to allow the platoon to use; however Mainwaring discovers that Square will only allow this if he himself is in charge of the platoon, as they are his own weapons.

Mainwaring is hesitant but as he runs out of options to keep his word to the men, he contacts Square and agrees to his terms, putting the platoon under the command of Square. The platoon is then marched out to Square's estate, where he has them ride horses. Mainwaring then inquires about the horses to Square's butler, who reveals that the horses belong to Bailey's Circus, and that Square is only looking after the horses for the duration of the war. Square's attempts to have the platoon use swords on horseback goes badly wrong, and Frazer tells Mainwaring that they would be happier as they were than using 'four-legged dragons'. Mainwaring is flattered but reluctant, until he discovers that the rifles are elephant-shooting muskets, and so Mainwaring ends the deal and takes control again.

Back at the church hall, a dejected Mainwaring gets a phone call telling him that the Local Defence Volunteers are being re-organised and will now be referred to as the 'Home Guard', which worsens his negativity. Taking a few minutes alone in his office before facing the platoon, a corporal arrives with a late delivery of five hundred LDV armbands, and, to Mainwaring's surprise, five new rifles. With his head high that he has been able to keep his word, Mainwaring takes the rifles into the main hall as the platoon cheer.

== Cast ==
- Arthur Lowe as Captain Mainwaring
- John Le Mesurier as Sergeant Wilson
- Clive Dunn as Lance Corporal Jones
- John Laurie as Private Frazer
- James Beck as Private Walker
- Arnold Ridley as Private Godfrey
- Ian Lavender as Private Pike
- Caroline Dowdeswell as Janet King
- Geoffrey Lumsden as Colonel Square
- Charles Hill as Butler
- Gordon Peters as Soldier

== Notes ==
1. First appearance of Colonel (later Captain) Square.
2. This is one of three episodes where Mainwaring ceases to command the platoon for a period of time. The others are If the Cap Fits... and Room at the Bottom.
3. The rifles seen on screen appear to be the Pattern 1914 Enfield or the M1917 Enfield. Similar rifles are carried by the platoon throughout the rest of the series. In The Bullet is Not for Firing, Mainwaring says they are .300 calibre, indicating they are M1917s. In the radio version of Command Decision, however, Mainwaring describes them as "Five sparkling Ross rifles."
