= The Sicilians =

1964 British film by Ernest Morris

- Theatrical release poster
- Directed by: Ernest Morris
- Screenplay by: Ronald Liles; Reginald Hearne
- Produced by: John I. Phillips
- Starring: Robert Hutton; Reginald Marsh; Ursula Howells
- Cinematography: Geoffrey Faithfull
- Edited by: Henry Richardson
- Music by: Johnny Gregory
- Production company: Butcher's Film Service
- Release date: 1964
- Running time: 70 minutes
- Country: United Kingdom
- Language: English

The Sicilians is a 1964 British second feature film directed by Ernest Morris and starring Robert Hutton, Reginald Marsh and Ursula Howells. The screenplay was by Ronald Liles and Reginald Hearne.

== Plot ==
Mafia member Angelo Di Marco betrays other mafioso in a court hearing, and in revenge his son is kidnapped. As the police investigate, Di Marco flees to Paris. It transpires that Di Marco's wife, also a mafia member, has arranged the kidnapping. Di Marco is shot dead.

== Cast ==
- Robert Hutton as Calvin Adams
- Reginald Marsh as Inspector Webb
- Ursula Howells as Madame Perrault
- Alex Scott as Henri Perrault
- Susan Denny as Carole
- Robert Ayres as Angelo Di Marco
- Eric Pohlmann as Inspector Bressin
- Patricia Hayes as plane passenger
- Warren Mitchell as O'Leary
- Richard Caldicot as Police Commissioner
- Gordon Tanner as District Attorney
- Michael Balfour as Stage Door keeper
- Murray Kash as George Baxter
- Maggy Sarragne as cabaret star
- Murray Evans as Sergeant Harris
- Derek Royle as porter
- Ivor Dean as Burford
- John McLaren as judge
- Chuck Julian as jury foreman
- John H. Watson as doctor at flats
- Sally Douglas as O'Leary's secretary
- Ralph Ball as constable
- Aleta Morrison as speciality dancer
- Michael Pemberton as hospital doctor
- Romo Gorrara as kidnapper
- Enid Lorimer as old lady
- Larry Cross as journalist
- Leslie Taussig as Tony Di Marco

== Critical reception ==
Monthly Film Bulletin said: "A mundane piece of detection, flatly directed and unconvincingly scripted. Some variety is achieved by rapid shifts in locale, from New York to London and then Paris, and by the insertion of cabaret items, but there is little compensation for the weakness of the narrative."

Chibnall and McFarlane in The British 'B' Film wrote that the film "tries to inject some life into its kidnapping plot by darting about between the USA (Manhattan skyline), Paris (Eiffel Tower) and London. The excellent Ursula Howells lifts the level of the film's flat dialogue exchanges, but the whole thing is padded with terrible cabaret acts, and the paper-thin characterisation includes caricatures of a chattering woman on a plane (Patricia Hayes), touchy stage doorman (Michael Balfour) and a 'gallant' Frenchman (Alex Scott)."

The Radio Times Guide to Films gave the film 2/5 stars, writing: "Known for his brisk approach to shooting and his no-nonsense style, Ernest Morris was able to make even the flimsiest of crime thrillers watchable, including this one about a dancer and a diplomat who search for a mafioso's kidnapped son. Robert Hutton is the imported Hollywood has-been and, even though he was never more than a second division star, he is streets ahead of this material."
