= Harry Littlewood =

English actor (1921–2003)

- Born: 23 May 1921; Manchester, Lancashire, England
- Died: 26 December 2003 (aged 82); Chelsea, London, England
- Occupations: Actor; writer
- Years active: 1958–1991

Harry Littlewood (23 May 1921 – 26 December 2003) was an English actor who has appeared in Coronation Street, George and Mildred, Z-Cars, Softly, Softly, The Saint, Never the Twain, Families, The Bill, Casualty, Bergerac, Howards' Way and Mind Your Language.

== Filmography ==
Year	Title	Role	Notes
1960	Two Way Stretch	Postman	
1963	The Set Up	Ticket Collector	
1979	Queen of the Blues	Derek	
1981	The Final Conflict	Orator	

== Television roles ==
Year	Title	Role	Notes
1958	The Diary of Samuel Pepys	Landlord of Dutch Inn, First Watchman	
1958	Solo for Canary	Prison Superintendent	
1958	Starr and Company	Steve Lacey	
1959	The Budds of Paragon Row	Mr. Parkin; Old Fiddler	
1959	Charlesworth	Roller	
1959	The Common Room	Café customer	
1959	The Widow of Bath	Peters	
1959	Nick of the River	Man on watch	
1959	Private Investigator	Charles	
1960	Where the Party Ended	Kenny	
1960	Probation Officer	Bert	
1960	Barnaby Rudge	Timid man	
1961	Stress Point	Alf	
1961	The Dobson Fund	First Electrician	
1961	Deadline Midnight	Policeman	
1961	Boyd Q.C.	First Poacher	
1961	Call Oxbridge 2000	George Marley	
1962	Crying Down the Lane	Bartender	
1962	The Wrong Way Back	Workman	
1962	The Big Pull	Corporal	
1962	Silent Evidence	Foster	
1962	Drama 61-67	Foster	
1962	Compact	Alf Middleton	
1963	The Edgar Wallace Mystery Theatre	Ticket Collector	
1963	The Plane Makers	Bert Simms	
1963	Suspense	Harry; Charlie	
1963	Festival	Jim Walsh	
1963	Friday Night	Second dealer	
1964	Sergeant Cork	William Holt	
1964	First Night	Ted	
1964	Meet the Wife	Taxi Driver	
1964	Taxi!	Alf Robbins	
1964	Catch Hand	Wilkie	
1964	The Massingham Affair	Joe Henderson	
1965	The Scales of Justice	Gibbs	
1965	No Hiding Place	Driver	
1965	Dixon of Dock Green	Cafe Proprietor	
1965	Redcap	Trooper Kelly	
1966	Theatre 625	Gaoler	
1966	United!	Fred Jackson	
1966	Public Eye	Jenkinson	
1966	Armchair Theatre	Photographer	
1966	Ransom for a Pretty Girl	Hotel Manager	
1966	Vendetta	Willie	
1967	Turn Out the Lights	Frank	
1967	Sir Arthur Conan Doyle	Percival Manners	
1967	Dr. Finlay's Casebook	Ticket collector	
1967	The Baron	Landlord	
1967	This Way for Murder	Charlie Masters	
1967	Send Foster	Councillor Bain	
1967	Inheritance	Third Weaver	
1968	The First Lady	Alan Hallsall	
1968	Gazette	Desk Clerk	
1969	The Saint	Postman	
1969–1970	Ours Is a Nice House	Alf Whittle	
1969; 1971; 1977, 1980; 1988	Coronation Street	Bert Fish; Fred Chapman; Sam Littlewood; Arnold Swift	
1970	Softly Softly: Task Force	Detective Chief Inspector Morris	
1970	A Family at War	Warden	
1971	Never Mind the Quality, Feel the Width	Joe	
1971	Z-Cars	Ansell	
1972	Mike and Bernie	Referee	
1972	Albert!	Road Worker	
1972	Follyfoot	Bargee	
1972	Alcock and Gander	George	
1972	Father, Dear Father	Photographer	
1972–1973	Nearest and Dearest	Pub Landlord	
1973	... And Mother Makes Three	Caterer's Man	
1973	Romany Jones	Porter	
1974	Love Thy Neighbour	Policeman; Undertaker; Police Sergeant	
1974	How's Your Father	First Man	
1974	Billy Liar	Detective Inspector Charlesworth	
1974	Bootsie and Snudge	Second Landlord	
1975	Man About the House	Driving Examiner	
1975	Doctor on the Go	Mr. Hepworth	
1976	Bless This House	Inspector	
1976	Yus, My Dear	Clerk; Waiter	
1976	George and Mildred	Mr. Groves, the locksmith	
1976	Spring & Autumn	Captain Roberts	
1977	Rooms	Postman	
1977	The Fosters	Old Man	
1977	The Fuzz	Baxter	
1977	George and Mildred	Frank	
1978	Crown Court	Bernard Harrison	
1978	Armchair Thriller	Caretaker	
1978	George and Mildred	Syd	
1978	The Rag Trade	Mr Phillips	
1979	A Moment in Time	Landlord	
1979	George and Mildred	Mr Turner	
1980	Ladykillers	Henry Porter	
1981	Robin's Nest	Customer	
1981	Cowboys	Barman	
