= Shadow of Fear (1964 film) =

1964 British film by Ernest Morris

- Directed by: Ernest Morris
- Screenplay by: Ronald C. Liles
- Produced by: John I. Phillips
- Starring: Paul Maxwell; Clare Owen; Anita West
- Cinematography: Walter J. Harvey
- Edited by: Henry Richardson
- Production company: Butcher's Film Service
- Release date: 16 February 1964
- Running time: 60 minutes
- Country: United Kingdom
- Language: English

Shadow of Fear is a 1964 British second feature ('B') film directed by Ernest Morris and starring Paul Maxwell, Clare Owen and Anita West. It was written by Ronald C. Liles and James O'Connolly from the story "Decoy, Be Damned" by T. F. Fotherby.

== Plot ==
Waiting in a Baghdad hotel for his flight to London, Bill Martin is asked by British Intelligence agent Jack Carter to deliver a secret message to his superior Mr. Oliver. In London Martin is met by his fiancée Barbara and two police officers who take him to a hotel to meet Oliver. Martin delivers the message, but when he mentions he has a photographic memory, he is confined overnight in the hotel room. When an intruder attempts to murder him, Martin shoots him, then discovers he was one of the "officers" who met him at the airport. Making contact with MI5, Martin and Barbara agree to help entrap the espionage ring by becoming decoys.

== Cast ==
- Paul Maxwell as Bill Martin
- Clare Owen as Barbara
- Anita West as Ruth Graydon
- John Sutton as Peter Halliday
- John Arnatt as Sharp
- Eric Pohlmann as Henry Spiroulous
- Alan Tilvern as Warner
- Reginald Marsh as Mr Oliver
- Colin Tapley as John Bowen
- Edward Ogden as Chase
- Anthony Wager as Jack Carter
- John Murray Scott as David Endacott
- Robert Russell as Ransome
- John H. Watson as Baker
- Jack Taylor as Holt
- Eugene Stylianou as hotel clerk
- Cecil Waters as Kalik
- Mia Karam as dancer

== Reception ==
The Monthly Film Bulletin wrote: "The film is completely conventional in approach and style, but is quite competently acted. Although to some extent foreseeable, the story is sufficiently well contrived to pass muster as a routine thriller."

Kine Weekly wrote: "This is a straightforward adventure tale, competently made and without pretensions. ... The mystery is not so well sustained once the action moves to England and it is hard to believe that MI5 or the hero and heroine would be quite so cavalier about the imminence of assassination. This apart, however, the scriptwriter and director have kept the action going at a good pace. Paul Maxwell is a personable hero, as Bill, and Clare Owen has a charming sangfroid, as Barbara, while John Arnatt makes a politely ruthless villain."

In The British 'B' Film, Chibnall and McFarlane wrote: "There are good production values throughout as the plot moves back to London and Sussex. There is an immense amount of talk bur the cast is more than competent and Morris keeps the intricate plot moving reasonably smartly."
