= Night Train for Inverness =

1960 British film by Ernest Morris

- Jane Hylton, Dennis Waterman and Norman Wooland
- Directed by: Ernest Morris
- Written by: Mark Grantham
- Produced by: Edward J. Danziger; Harry Lee Danziger
- Cinematography: James Wilson
- Edited by: Spencer Reeve
- Music by: Albert Elms
- Production company: Danziger Productions
- Distributed by: Paramount British Pictures (UK)
- Release date: January 1960 (UK)
- Running time: 69 minutes
- Country: United Kingdom
- Language: English

Night Train for Inverness (also known as Night Train to Inverness) is a 1960 black and white British second feature ('B') drama film directed by Ernest Morris and starring Norman Wooland, Jane Hylton and Dennis Waterman. It was written by Mark Grantham and produced by The Danzigers.

It is notable as the film debut of Dennis Waterman and was referenced in an episode of The Minder Podcast (about the ITV series 1979–1994, 2009, featuring Waterman).

== Plot ==
Roy Lewis, just released from gaol, is told by his hostile ex-mother-in-law that his ex-wife and their young son Ted do not want to see him. He meets his son, who in fact is fond of his father and agrees to go with him on a train trip to Inverness, not knowing that Lewis intends to keep permanent custody of Ted and bring him up on his own. However, Lewis does not know that Ted has recently been diagnosed as diabetic and must have regular insulin injections. Meanwhile, Ted's mother calls in the police who launch an urgent operation to track them down.

== Cast ==
- Norman Wooland as Roy Lewis
- Jane Hylton as Marion Crane
- Dennis Waterman as Ted Lewis
- Silvia Francis as Ann Lewis
- Valentine Dyall as Inspector Kent
- Irene Arnold as Mrs Wall
- Colin Tapley as Dr Jackson
- Howard Lang as sergeant
- Kaplan Kaye as Charles
- Arnold Bell as Higgins
- Anton Rodgers as intern
- Larry Noble as buffet attendant

== Critical reception ==
The Monthly Film Bulletin wrote: "The action pointedly plays for suspense and pathos, but a contrived script and self-conscious, heavy-handed direction prove insurmountable obstacles. The net result is extremely mild, with the wife – effectively played by Silvia Francis – emerging as by far the most convincing character."

Kine Weekly wrote: "The picture extracts human sentiment from the young diabetic's plight and creates penultimate suspense, but whether or not this is mis-applied showmanship depends on the individual viewer. It could give some audiences the needle! Denis Waterman is quite natural as Ted, Jane Hylton and Silvia Francis score if contrast as Marion and Ann, Norman Wooland registers as Roy, and Irene Arnold convinces as the interfering Mrs. Wall. The settings are suitably varied, and the vital train journey anything but uneventful."

TV Guide gave it two out of four stars, calling it an "average drama."

The List gave it three out of five stars, and wrote, "this tight, train-bound 1960 thriller has a lot to commend it... Gutsy (for its time) and very watchable."

The film historians Steve Chibnall and Brian McFarlane wrote that the film "generates genuine suspense from a neatly plotted screenplay".
