= Aleta Morrison =

English actress (1932–2020)

Aleta Morrison was an English dancer and actress, known for appearances in the films, The Sicilians, Half a Sixpence and Petticoat Pirates.

Morrison came to prominence as a dancer on the West End, where she met and married her husband, fellow actor, Desmond Ainsworth in 1953 while the pair were appearing in a production of Paint Your Wagon. They appeared in the musical Can Can together in 1956. She became known for her long legs, often described in the press as the longest legs in showbusiness. Her legs were 42.5 inches long. She earned her work advertising hosiery. One advertisement campaign she was in courted controversy in Ireland where her full legs in stockings were considered too sexy for the Irish cinema censors, who insisted the image be only from her knees down.

Although Morrison never received star billing, she became a regular bit player in British cinema and television throughout the 1960s and 1970s. She appeared uncredited in Moulin Rouge and You Know What Sailors Are as well as the TV show The Avengers.

Morrison died in July 2020.
