= Tarnished Heroes =

1961 British film by Ernest Morris

- Directed by: Ernest Morris
- Written by: Brian Clemens
- Produced by: Edward J. Danziger; Harry Lee Danziger
- Starring: Dermot Walsh; Anton Rogers
- Cinematography: James Wilson
- Edited by: Desmond Saunders
- Music by: Bill LeSage
- Production company: Danziger Productions
- Distributed by: Warner-Pathé Distributors
- Release date: 16 July 1961
- Running time: 75 minutes
- Country: United Kingdom
- Language: English

Tarnished Heroes is a 1961 British war film directed by Ernest Morris and starring Dermot Walsh and Anton Rodgers. It was written by Brian Clemens and produced by Danziger Productions.

The film is set in France during World War II, and concerns a British major who blows up a strategic bridge. The plot of the film bears similarities to The Dirty Dozen, although it was made five years before Robert Aldrich's film, and three years before the novel on which it is based.

== Plot ==
Major Roy Bell decides to embark on a suicide mission to blow up a bridge which is of strategic importance to the enemy. However, the only resource available to him is a group of rag-tag army failures, made up of drunks, thieves and deserters. According to the officer's handbook, 'an officer will perform whatever task confronts him with whatever men are available'. Under Bell's guidance, these men must now rise to the challenge and prove themselves as heroes if they are to fulfil the mission and come back alive.

== Cast ==
- Dermot Walsh as Major Roy Bell
- Anton Rodgers as Private Donald Conyers
- Patrick McAlinney as Private Timothy Reilly
- Richard Carpenter as Private Frederick Burton
- Maurice Kaufmann as Private Thomas Mason
- Max Butterfield as Private Anthony Burton
- Brian Peck as Private Bernard White
- Hugh David as Private Walter Hoyt
- Sheila Whittingham as Josette
- Graham Stewart as corporal
- John Scott as Col. Moreton
- Stuart Hillier as Capt. Mead
- Andreas Malandrinos as Flamoun
- Frank Thornton as trench officer
- Richard Bennett as officer
- Eric Corrie as officer

== Critical reception ==
The Monthly Film Bulletin wrote: "Dragging British World War II film with most of the textbook clichés: standard second feature action sequences, mildly purposeful acting."

Kine Weekly wrote: "The characters, who, by the way, keep remarkably fit without eating or imbibing, are somewhat clumsily drawn and deployed, but the staging is effective. It's the real McCoy until you closely examine the script, nearly shot to pieces by incredibilities and inconsistencies. ... The picture, a cut-price cross between Journey's End and The Lost Patrol, abounds with cliches punctuated by intermittent gunfire. Dermot Walsh keeps a stiff upper lip as Bell, but Patrick McAlinney and Maurice Kaufmann, as Reilly and Mason, and the other players representing tough army types are very theatrical, and Sheila Whittingham looks as if she's just stepped out of musical comedy as Josette. The Germans display little tactical skill and their gullibility, plus the novelettish romantic sequences, all but spike the film's guns."

Tortillafilms wrote "Ernest Morris makes a good little film."

Sky Movies noted", things are reassuringly in their place with Dermot Walsh, hero of a fistful of `B' movies, at the head of the cast. In a small role as a trench officer, you may spot Frank Thornton, later well-known on television for his long-running role in Are You Being Served?."
