= Anton Rodgers =

English actor (1933–2007)

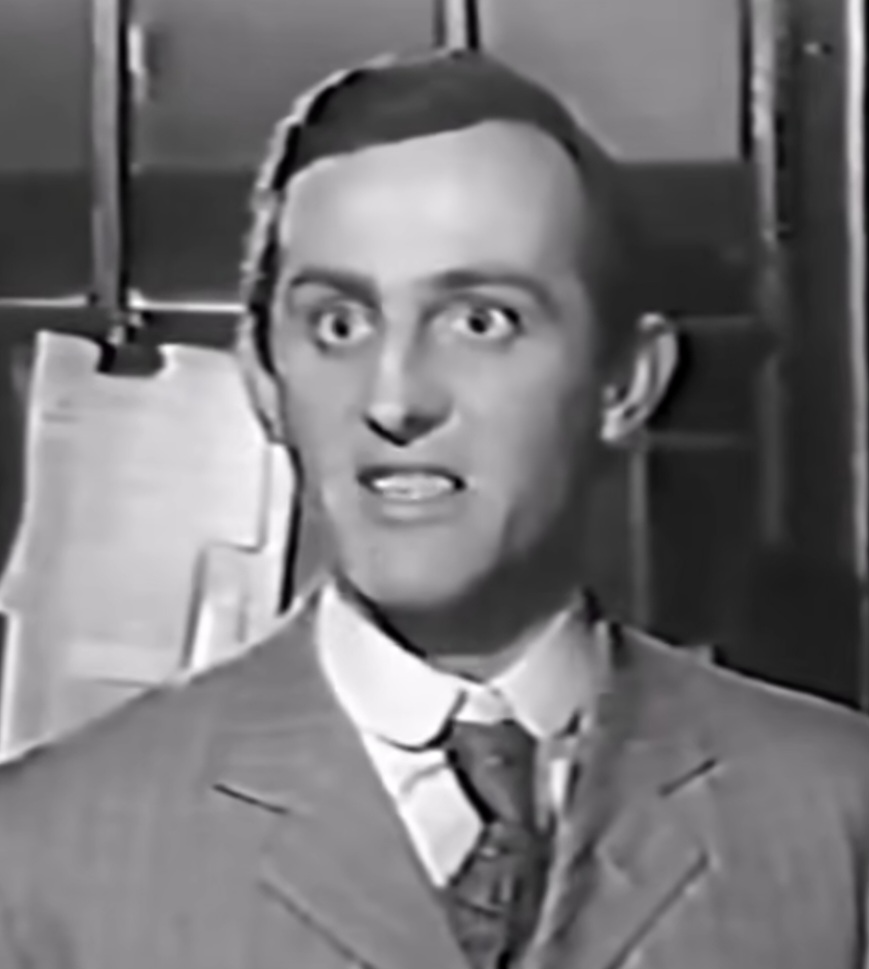
- Rodgers in an episode of One Step Beyond (1961)
- Born: Anthony Rodgers; 10 January 1933; London, England
- Died: 1 December 2007 (aged 74); Reading, Berkshire, England
- Education: Italia Conti Academy; London Academy of Music and Dramatic Art
- Occupation: Actor
- Years active: 1947–2007
- Spouses: Morna Watson (m. 1959, divorced); Elizabeth Garvie (m. 1983)
- Children: 5

Anthony Rodgers (10 January 1933 – 1 December 2007) was an English actor and occasional director. He performed on stage, in film, in television dramas and sitcoms. He starred in several sitcoms, including Fresh Fields (ITV, 1984–1986), its sequel French Fields (ITV, 1989–1991), and May to December (BBC, 1989–1994).

In the 1960s and early 1970s, he appeared in many of the Lew Grade Incorporated Television Company classics. He was the memorable villain in the 1968 episode "One of Our Aircraft Is Empty" in the spy-fi Department S.

He also appeared in films, including Scrooge (1970) The Day of the Jackal (1973) and Dirty Rotten Scoundrels (1988).

== Early life and career ==
Rodgers was born on 10 January 1933 in London, the son of William Robert Rodgers and Leonore Victoria (née Wood). His early education was at Westminster City School. The family was evacuated to Wisbech, Isle of Ely, during the war, where his father worked for Balding and Mansell, printers of ration books, permits and passes; Rodgers is sometimes erroneously reported as having been born in Wisbech. Later, he was educated at the Italia Conti Academy and LAMDA.

He appeared on stage from the age of 14. He was known for his television performances, specifically his long-running roles in the television sitcoms Fresh Fields in the 1980s and May to December from 1989 to 1994.

He also had a long career both on stage and in film. His stage roles ranged from contemporary comedy and satirical farce to Restoration comedy, Ibsen, Shaw and Wilde and Peter Nichols. He appeared in films such as The Man Who Haunted Himself (1970), Scrooge (1970, in which he performed the Academy Award-nominated Best Original Song "Thank You Very Much"), The Day of the Jackal (1973), and The Fourth Protocol (1987). He also narrated the children's animated TV series Old Bear Stories, and appeared as Andre, the comically corrupt French policeman who aided Michael Caine in his romantic and financial schemes in Dirty Rotten Scoundrels.

He narrated three programmes for the railway video production company Video 125

== Personal life ==
Rodgers married Morna Watson, a ballet dancer, in Kensington in 1959, having a son and a daughter and later divorcing. Rodgers's second wife was the actress Elizabeth Garvie; they frequently appeared on stage together and toured giving readings from the works of Jane Austen and Robert Browning, among others.

He was a patron of the Angles Theatre, Wisbech.

Rodgers died in Reading, Berkshire on 1 December 2007, aged 74. At the time of his death, he was a resident of Whitchurch-on-Thames, Oxfordshire.

== Credits ==
=== Theatre ===
Rodgers made his first West End appearance in 1947, aged 14, in Carmen at the Royal Opera House, Covent Garden. He followed this in same year with a tour of an adaptation of Charles Dickens' Great Expectations playing Pip, and the title role in a revival of Terence Rattigan's The Winslow Boy which toured the UK in 1948. After repertory experience at Birmingham, Northampton and Hornchurch, he trained at LAMDA.

Returning to London in November 1957, he joined the cast of The Boy Friend at Wyndham's Theatre. Thereafter, his credits include:

- Fingers in The Crooked Mile, Cambridge Theatre, September 1959
- Appeared in the revue And Another Thing, Fortune Theatre, October 1960
- Appeared in the revue Twists, Arts Theatre, February 1962; and Edinburgh Festival, August 1962
- Withers and Tim in John Osborne's double-bill, Plays for England, Royal Court, July 1962
- He was a member of the original cast of the musical Pickwick, in which he played Mr Jingle, Saville Theatre July 1963; making his New York debut in the same role at the 46th Street Theatre, October 1965
- Felix in The Owl and the Pussycat, Criterion Theatre, February 1966
- Chichester Festival season 1967: Francis Archer in The Beaux' Stratagem; Randall Utterword in Heartbreak House; and Fadinard in the Labiche farce An Italian Straw Hat
- Title role in Henry V, Belgrade Theatre, Coventry, March 1968
- Vladimir in Waiting for Godot, University Theatre, Manchester, 1968
- Directed A Piece of Cake and Grass Roots at Leatherhead, 1968
- Devised and co-directed We Who Are About To... with George Melly at Hampstead Theatre, February 1969; eight one-act plays presented in a modified form as Mixed Doubles at the Comedy Theatre, April 1969
- Dr Stockman in An Enemy of the People, Harrogate, August 1969
- Directed The Fantasticks, Hampstead, May 1970, and took this production and The Rainmaker to the Ibiza Festival
- Directed The Roses of Eyam and The Taming of the Shrew at the Northcott Theatre, Exeter, 1970
- Gerald in The Formation Dancers, Hampstead Theatre, January 1971
- Frank in Forget-Me-Not Lane (Peter Nichols), Greenwich Theatre, then Apollo Theatre, April 1971
- Macheath in The Threepenny Opera, Stratford Festival, Ontario. 1972
- Dr Rank in A Doll's House, Criterion Theatre, February 1973
- Hildy Johnson in The Front Page. National Theatre production touring Australia, 1974
- Lord Henry Wotton in The Picture of Dorian Gray, Greenwich Theatre, February 1975
- Directed Death of a Salesman, Oxford Playhouse, October 1975
- Astrov in Uncle Vanya, Oxford Playhouse, December 1975
- Jack Manningham in Gaslight, Criterion Theatre, March 1976
- Directed Are You Now or Have You Ever Been...?, Bush Theatre, June 1977
- Directed Flashpoint, New End Theatre, December 1978; May Fair Theatre, February 1979
- Leading role in the 'musical entertainment' Songbook, Globe Theatre, July 1979
- Songbook was at the Angles Theatre, Wisbech, Cambridgeshire for a single performance on a Sunday to raise funds for restoring this Georgian theatre.
- Jim in Passion (Peter Nichols), RSC Aldwych Theatre, January 1981
- Walter Burns in Windy City, Victoria Palace, July 1982
- Richard de Beauchamp in Saint Joan (George Bernard Shaw), National Theatre Olivier, February 1984
- Tudor Phillips in Some Singing Blood, Royal Court Theatre Upstairs, March 1992
- Gerry Stratton in Time of My Life (Alan Ayckbourn), Vaudeville Theatre, August 1993
- Dr Feldman in Duet for One revival (Tom Kempinski), Riverside Studios. May 1996
- Etienne in Under the Doctor, Comedy Theatre. February 2001
- Grandpa Potts in Chitty Chitty Bang Bang, London Palladium, April 2002

=== Selected filmography ===
- Vice Versa (1948) – Pupil (uncredited)
- The Browning Version (1951) – Pupil (uncredited)
- Crash Drive (1959) – Tomson
- Night Train for Inverness (1960) – Scottish Doctor (uncredited)
- The Spider's Web (1960) – Sgt. Jones
- On the Fiddle (1960) – Soldier in NAAFI Canteen (uncredited)
- Tarnished Heroes (1961) – Don Conyers
- Part-Time Wife (1961) – Tom Briggs
- Petticoat Pirates (1961) – Alec
- Girl on Approval (1961) – Snooty Bowler-hatted Neighbour (uncredited)
- Carry On Cruising (1962) – Young Man
- Operation Stogie (1962) – Jock
- The Traitors (1962)
- The Iron Maiden (1962) – Concierge
- This Sporting Life (1963) – Restaurant Customer (uncredited)
- Carry On Jack (1964) – Hardy
- Comedy Workshop: Love and Maud Carver (1964) – P.R.O. / Window Dresser
- Rotten to the Core (1965) – The Duke
- To Chase a Million (1967) – Max Stein
- The Man Who Haunted Himself (1970) – Tony Alexander
- Scrooge (1970) – Tom Jenkins
- The Day of the Jackal (1973) – Jules Bernard
- The Secret Agent (1975) – Mr. Vladimir
- Intimate Reflections (1975) – Michael White
- East of Elephant Rock (1977) – Mackintosh
- The Fourth Protocol (1987) – George Berenson
- Dirty Rotten Scoundrels (1988) – Inspector Andre
- Impromptu (1991) – Duke D'Antan
- Son of the Pink Panther (1993) – Chief Lazar
- Secret Passage (2004) – Foscari
- The Merchant of Venice (2004) – The Duke
- The Last Drop (2006) – Churchill (uncredited)
- Go Go Tales (2007) – Barfly

=== Television ===
- The Sky Larks (1958) – L.T. Gilmore, RN (16 episodes)
- One Step Beyond (1961) – Mark (1 episode)
- Compact (1962) – Phil (2 episodes)
- The Third Man (1962) – Fred (1 episode)
- Maigret (1962) – Radek (1 episode)
- The Old Curiosity Shop (1962–1963) –Dick Swiveller (12 episodes)
- Richard the Lionheart (1962–1963) – Sir Kenneth Stuart (4 episodes)
- The Sentimental Agent (1963) – Mr Fripp (1 episode)
- Danger Man (1964) – Attala (1 episode)
- Gideon's Way (1965) – Peter Slone (1 episode)
- Sherlock Holmes (1965) – Hugh Boone (1 episode)
- Out of the Unknown: The Eye (1966) – Julian Clay
- Blanding's Castle (1967) – Rupert Baxter (1 episode)
- Man in a Suitcase (1967) – Max Stein (2 episodes)
- The Prisoner (1967) – Number Two (1 episode)
- The Saint (1967) – Pierre (1 episode)
- The World of Wooster (1967) – Bicky Bickersteth (1 episode)
- The Champions (1968) – Jules (1 episode)
- Department S (1969) – Terrell (1 episode)
- The Elusive Pimpernel (1969) – Sir Percy Blakeney (10 episodes)
- Randall and Hopkirk (Deceased) (1969) – Calvin Bream (1 episode)
- Fraud Squad (1970) – Dr. David Matthews (1 episode)
- Upstairs, Downstairs (1971) – Scone (1 episode)
- Jason King (1971) – Philippe de Brion (2 episodes)
- The Organisation (1972) – Peter Frame (7 episodes)
- The Protectors (1972) – Alan Sutherland ( 1 episode)
- Affairs of the Heart (1974) – James Mallory (2 episodes)
- Justice (1974) – Frank Jarrot (1 episode)
- Zodiac (1974) –David Gradley (6 episodes)
- The Secret Agent (1975) – Mr Vladimir
- Nightingale's Boys (1975) – Izzy (1 episode)
- Village Hall (1975) – Hon. Gerald Napier (1 episode)
- The Duchess of Duke Street (1976) – Newdigate (1 episode)
- Crown Court (1977) – Thomas Haspburg-Jones QC (3 episodes)
- Murder Most English: A Flaxborough Chronicle (1977) – Detective Inspector Purbright (7 episodes)
- Disraeli (1978) – Bentinck (1 episode)
- Lillie (1978) – Edward Langtry (1 episode)
- Rumpole of the Bailey (1978) – Ken Aspen (1 episode)
- Return of the Saint (1978) – Geoffrey Connaught (1 episode)
- Play for Today: Coming Out (1979) – Lewis Duncan / Zippy Grimes
- Thomas & Sarah (1979) – Richard DeBrassey (1 episode)
- Something in Disguise (1981) – John Cole (3 episode)
- Pictures (1983) – Garfield Forbes-Lawson (6 episodes)
- Fresh Fields (1984–1986) – William Fields (27 episodes)
- Murder with Mirrors (1985) – Dr. Max Hargrove
- After the War (1989) – Samuel Jordan (7 episodes)
- Comeback (1989) – John
- French Fields (1989–1991) – William Fields (19 episodes)
- May to December (1989–1994) – Alec Callender (39 episodes)
- Performance (1992) – David Scott-Fowler (1 episode)
- The Queen's Nose (1996–1999) – Mr. Swingit (3 episodes)
- Noah's Ark (1997–1998) – Noah Kirby (12 episodes)
- Up Rising (2000) – Ronald Kegworthy (5 episode)
- Midsomer Murders "Market for Murder" (2002) – Lord James Chetwood (1 episode)
- C. S. Lewis: Beyond Narnia (2005) – C. S. Lewis
- Where the Heart Is (2006) – Fred (1 episode)
- Longford (2006) – William Whitelaw
- You Can Choose Your Friends (2007) – Ken Snell

=== Voice ===
- HST West (1986) & Far West (1990) – Narrator
- HST Great West (1993) – Narrator
- Old Bear Stories (1993–1997) – Narrator, Old Bear, Bramwell Brown, Little Bear, Rabbit and many others (41 episode)
- Brambly Hedge (1997–1998) – Lord Woodmouse (2 episodes)
- Wide-Eye (2003) – Wide-Eye, Great Grandma Toad and Father Natterjack (2 episodes)
- The Paz Show (2005) – Pappy (15 episodes)
