= Eric Woodburn =

Scottish actor (1894–1981)

- Born: Eric Melville Reis; 9 March 1894; Glasgow, Scotland
- Died: 25 October 1981 (aged 87); Camden, London, England
- Occupation: Actor • Singer

Eric Woodburn (né Eric Melville Reis; 9 March 1894 – 25 October 1981) was a Scottish stage, film and television actor. Prior to this he had a long career on the stage and was also a noted baritone singer.

His most important role was as Doctor Alexander Snoddie in Dr. Finlay's Casebook. He also played the father of Lance Corporal Jones in the Museum Piece episode of Dad's Army.

== Theatre ==
Year	Title	Role	Company	Director	Notes
1948	Ane Satyre of the Thrie Estaites	a bishop	The Glasgow Citizens' Theatre	Tyrone Guthrie, Moultrie Kelsall	play by Sir David Lyndsay, adapted by Robert Kemp

== Filmography ==
Year	Title	Role	Notes
1936	Full steam		
1936	Bottle Party		
1952	You're Only Young Twice	The Bedellus	
1952	The Brave Don't Cry	Rab Elliott	
1953	Laxdale Hall	Gamlie	
1953	The Kidnappers (US: The Little Kidnappers)	Sam Howie	
1954	The Maggie	Skipper	
1955	Geordie	Jean's Father	Uncredited
1959	The Bridal Path	Archie	
1959	Naked Fury	Frank Hawking	
1960	The Battle of the Sexes	Wine Shop Proprietor	
1960	Tunes of Glory	Landlord	
1961	The Innocents	Coachman	Uncredited
1962	Two and Two Make Six	Falstaff	
1962	The Dock Brief	Judge Banter	
1962	The Amorous Prawn	Publican	
1963	I Could Go on Singing	Verger	
1965	Two Left Feet	Tramp	Uncredited
1966	Ambush at Devil's Gap	Prof. Jennings	
1966	Miss MacTaggart Won't Lie Down	Morrison	short film
1971	Kidnapped	Doctor	(final film role)
