= Richard the Lionheart (TV series) =

British television series (1961–1965)

- Also known as: Riccardo Cuor di Leone (Italy); Richard Löwenherz (West Germany)
- Genre: Adventure; Family; History
- Written by: Stanley Miller; Paul Tabori; David Nicholl; Mark Grantham
- Directed by: Ernest Morris
- Starring: Dermot Walsh; Robin Hunter; Alan Haywood; Iain Gregory; Sheila Whittingham; Trader Faulkner; Marne Maitland
- Opening theme: "Richard the Lionheart"
- Ending theme: "Richard the Lionheart"
- Composer: Bill Le Sage
- Country of origin: United Kingdom
- Original language: English
- No. of series: 1
- No. of episodes: 39 (list of episodes)

Production
- Executive producers: Edward J. Danziger; Harry Lee Danziger
- Cinematography: Walter J. Harvey
- Editors: Peter Pitt; John S. Smith
- Running time: 30 minutes
- Production company: Danziger Productions Ltd.

Original release
- Network: Independent Television (ITV) (UK)
- Release: 4 June 1962 – 13 December 1963

Richard the Lionheart was a British ITV television series which ran from 1962 to 1963, aimed at younger audiences.

It began with the death of King Henry II, and put forward the traditional view of King Richard the Lionheart as a hero, and his brother Prince John (played by Trader Faulkner) as the villain.

Richard was played by Irish actor Dermot Walsh who said, "he was not always all one would like to see as a man. We have concentrated on his good side." Richard was perhaps a product of his time. A man brimful of contradictions. A brilliant general, but a poor ruler. A sensitive poet and singer.

The producers claimed that the series was based on fact as far as possible; though as little was known of Richard's personal life, "we have taken some liberties here and there," according to associate producer Brian Taylor in a TV Times article indicating the start of the series.

Other regular characters in the series included Sir Gilbert (Robin Hunter), Sir Geoffrey (Alan Haywood), Blondel (Ian Gregory), Leopold of Austria (Francis de Wolff) and Queen Berengaria (Sheila Whittingham).

According to BFI Screenonline "despite the treadmill efforts of the production... this routine swashbuckler, presenting an atmosphere of knightly conduct versus villainous skulduggery, was saved from total tedium by the presence of recurring players Trader Faulkner, a sneering Prince John, and Francis de Wolfe as the delightfully monstrous Leopold of Austria."

A single DVD was released by Stratx Digital Media on 6 June 2016. Although all episodes are thought to survive, the DVD contains only five episodes: "Long Live The King", "School For a King", "Crown In Danger", "The Pirate King" and "The Challenge". The picture quality for the most part is watchable, but the sound at times is flawed. In October 2022, Network released the entire series on DVD.

In March 2025 Talking Pictures TV started a rerun of the series as part of its Saturday Morning Pictures slot.

== Cast ==
- Dermot Walsh as King Richard The Lionheart
- Robin Hunter as Sir Gilbert / Farmer / First Farmer
- Alan Haywood as Sir Geoffrey / First Soldier / Messenger / Dead Monk / Second Farmer
- Iain Gregory as Blondel / Second Soldier
- Trader Faulkner as Prince John / Pirate / Villanus / The Pretender / Ubaldo / King Philip of France / Priest / Elias / Marcel / Jacques
- Sheila Whittingham as Queen Berengaria
- Francis de Wolff as Baron Giles / Leopold Of Austria
- Max Faulkner as Knight / De Fleury / Second Soldier / Second Austrian Guard / Soldier
- Michael Peake as Pirate Captain / Conrad of Montferrat
- Ian Fleming as Lord Chamberlain / Chancellor
- Brian McDermott as Banister / Sir Godfrey
- Glyn Owen as Edmund / Hugo
- John Longden as Sir Thomas
- Elwyn Brook-Jones as Count Rolf / Tancred, King of Sicily
- David Davenport as Black Knight / 1st Courtier / First Soldier / First Austrian Guard / Soldier
- Conrad Phillips as Guy of Lusignan
- Anton Rodgers as Sir Kenneth
- Marne Maitland as Saladin
- Anne Lawson as Marta
- Garard Green as St. Luc / Captain / Friar James
- Peter Reynolds as Sergeant Michael
- Colin Tapley as Chamberlain
- Julie Alexander as Lady Rosalie
- Tom Bowman as Baron Fitz-Rheinfrid / Gaoler
- Jennifer Daniel as Lady Edith
- Howard Greene as Abdul
- Prudence Hyman as Queen Eleanor
- Steve Plytas as Ulric / Merchant
- Susan Shaw as Princess Alice
- Robert Rietti as Father Ignatius
- Roy Kinnear as Nectabanus / Michael
- Jeremy Bisley as Second Prince
- Brian Cobby as Captain
- Lisa Daniely as Catherine / Martha
- Hugo De Vernier as French soldier/ Duke of Aumerle
- Peter Duguid as Old Arab / Third Thief
- Humphrey Lestocq as La Motte
- John Scott as King William / Baron
- Alan Rolfe as William / Innkeeper
- John Serret as French Ambassador / Duke of Berri / Messenger
- Richard Shaw as Abbas / Manfred
- Paul Grist as Swimmer / Servant
- Derrick Sherwin as Pierre / Alan
- John Bay as Captain / The Black Knight / 2nd English soldier / Crossbowman
- John Bennett as Lombrico / Kemal
- Martin Benson as Forked Beard / Jeweller
- Christopher Carlos as Theodore
- Eric Dodson as Nur / Chancellor
- Tony Doonan as Sir Miles
- John Gabriel as De Glanville
- Tom Gill as Fitzcormac
- Olaf Pooley as Pilgrim / Sheik Mahmoud
- Raymond Rollett as De Bohm
- Nigel Green as Hermit
- Ralph Michael as Sheriff of Nottingham
- Walter Randall as Second Thief / Sailor
- Daphne Anderson as Lady Guinevere
- Michael Ashlin as 2nd Courtier
- Dawn Beret as Lady Blanche
- Brandon Brady as Sergeant-at-Arms
- Kevin Brennan as Bertram de la Marche
- John Brooking as Steward
- Robert Bruce as Royal servant
- Vivienne Burgess as Maid
- Ian Curry as Sir Roland
- Hugh David as 1st Knight
- Patrick Durkin as Guard
- Peter Elliott as Simeon
- Denzil Ellis as Steward
- William Forbes as Tom the tracker
- Silvia Francis as Lady Stephanie
- Willoughby Goddard as Arnold de Chatillon
- Nicholas Grimshaw as Physician
- Laurence Hardy as Salivar
- Reginald Hearne as Steward
- Stuart Hillier as Herald of Scotland
- Robert Hollyman as Monk
- Peter Illing as Stephen de Tours
- John Kelland as Sir Percy
- David Ludman as 2nd Guard
- Oliver MacGreevy as 1st Guard
- Andreas Malandrinos as Gatekeeper
- Zena Marshall as Zara
- Francis Matthews as Sir Humphrey
- Jack May as 2nd Knight
- Ferdy Mayne as Merlin
- Michael McStay as Knight
- Riggs O'Hara as Ali
- Katharine Page as Mother Maria
- Bill Parsons as Priest
- George Pastell as Gamal
- Soraya Rafat as Villa
- Hubert Rees as Chamberlain / Squire
- Nadja Regin as Shirin
- Dominic Roche as King Henry II
- Alec Ross as 1st English soldier / 1st soldier
- Stuart Saunders as Merchant / Landlord
- Harold Siddons as Morgan
- Vanessa Thornton as Lady-in-waiting
- Hedger Wallace as Noble
- Beresford Williams as Archbishop
- Alister Williamson as Red Hugh
- Norman Wynne as Harbour Master
- Fredric Abbott as Guard
- Michael Barrington as Officer
- Roger Bizley as First Thief
- John Boyd-Brent as Captain
- Jocelyn Britton as Helen
- Tom Busby as First Sailor
- Maurice Bush as Second Mate
- Richard Caldicot as Baron Fitzgeorge
- Golda Casimir as Jewish Woman
- John Cater as Servant
- Noel Coleman as Sir Roland
- Billy Cornelius as Fourth Soldier
- Roger Delgado as Laki
- Richard Dobson as Stable Boy
- Clifford Earl as First Soldier
- William Fox as Father Gerard
- Anna Gerber as Farah
- John Gill as Evan
- Nora Gordon as Innkeeper's Wife
- Walter Gotell as Prince Otto
- Neil Hallett as Lemuel
- John Hatton as Second Arab
- Joan Haythorne as Queen Eleanor
- Eira Heath as Rose
- John G. Heller as First Prince
- Ronald Howard as Robin Hood
- Jane Hylton as Megan
- Jill Ireland as Marianne
- Anthony Jacobs as Lord Roger
- Jennifer Jayne as Mary
- Ann Lancaster as Second Onlooker
- Howard Lang as First Shepherd
- Philip Latham as Brian McFergus
- Sean Lynch as Gangleader Demere
- Robert MacKenzie as Sailor Guard
- John Mahoney as Tailor
- Bernard Martin as Guard
- Jack Melford as Monk
- Bernadette Milnes as Girl
- Bartlett Mullins as Jasper
- Peter Myers as Sir Hugh
- Bill Nagy as Meredith
- Michael O'Brien as Sir Thomas
- Rasidi Onikoyi as Nubian
- Roy Patrick as Captain
- Ellen Pollock as Lady Melinda
- Robert Raglan as Father Benedict
- Frederick Rawlings as Third Onlooker
- Robert Robinson as First Arab
- Margaretta Scott as Duchess
- John Southworth as Second Shepherd
- Victor Spinetti as Pierre
- Charles Stanley as First Onlooker
- Derek Sydney as Guard
- Donald Tandy as Herald of France
- June Thorburn as Diane
- Leon Cortez as Innkeeper
- Michael Wells as Second Soldier
- Jill Williams as Nora
- Christopher Witty as Arthur
- Michael Wynne as Captain
- Colin Bean as Yeoman
