= Ours Is a Nice House =

British TV comedy series (1969–1970)

- Genre: Sitcom
- Written by: Harry Littlewood
- Directed by: Stuart Allen; Howard Ross
- Starring: Thora Hird
- Country of origin: United Kingdom
- Original language: English
- No. of series: 2
- No. of episodes: 13

Production
- Producer: Stuart Allen
- Production company: ATV

Original release
- Network: ITV
- Release: 10 October 1969 – 5 September 1970

Ours Is a Nice House is a British television sitcom which aired for two series on ITV between 10 October 1969 and 5 September 1970. Produced by ATV it starred Thora Hird as the landlady of a boarding house in Northern England, whose boarders are generally show business types.

== Main cast ==
- Thora Hird as Thora Parker
- Ruth Holden as Elsie Crabtree
- May Warden as Gran
- Leslie Meadows as Alan Parker
- Harry Littlewood as Alf Whittle
- Caroline Dowdeswell as Vera Parker
- Ray Fell as Dudley Banks-Smith
- Damaris Hayman as Louise Bottomley
- David Stoll as Brandon Bailey
- Beatrix Mackey as Mrs. Orpington-Hunt

== Bibliography ==
- Newcomb, Horace. Encyclopedia of Television. Routledge, 2014.
