= Robin Hunter (actor) =

British actor (1929–2004)

- Born: 4 September 1929; London, England
- Died: 8 March 2004 (aged 74); Hampstead, London, England
- Occupations: Actor; writer
- Spouses: Maria Charles (m. 1952; div. 1966) Amanda Barrie (m. 1967)
- Children: 2; including Kelly Hunter

Robin Ian Hunter (4 September 1929 – 8 March 2004) was an English actor who was also a performer and writer in musicals, music halls, and comedy.

== Life and career ==
The son of actor Ian Hunter, he made film and television appearances from the 1950s to the 1990s, which included Up Pompeii, the Carry Ons, Sherlock Holmes and Poirot.

Musicals in which he performed included Damn Yankees, and the scripts he wrote himself for the Aba Daba Music Hall were of a comedic turn – such as Botome's Dream (produced in Brighton) in which Shakespeare is put on trial for plagiarism, and Aladdin & His Microsoft Compatible Floppy Drive Laptop (performed at the Arches Theatre, Southwark).

For many years, he and his girlfriend Aline Waites – an actress, playwright and critic – collaborated with him on scripts for plays, revues and musical theatre of all kinds. Their Illustrated Victorian Songbook was published by Michael Joseph in 1984.

Appearances in West End theatre included male lead in Barefoot in the Park, and juvenile lead in The Pleasure of his Company.

He married twice. Firstly to the actress Maria Charles, with whom he had two daughters, the stage manager Samantha Hunter and the actress Kelly Hunter; the couple divorced in 1966. His second wife was Amanda Barrie from 1967; they separated in the 1980s, but never divorced.

Hunter died in Hampstead, London from emphysema in 2004 aged 74.

== Selected filmography ==
- The Spanish Sword (1962) as Thomas of Exeter
- Three Spare Wives (1962) as George
- Masters of Venus (1962) as Peter
- Richard the Lionheart (1962–1963, TV Series) as Sir Gilbert
- Doctor in Clover (1966) as Sydney
- Modesty Blaise (1966) as Pilot
- All the Way Up (1970) as Malcolm
- Universal Soldier (1970) as Bradshaw
- Melody (1971) as George
- Vampire Circus (1972) as Hauser
- Carry On Matron (1972) as Mr. Darling
- The Phantom of the Opera (1989) as Roland
