= Giles Cooper (producer) =

British concert promoter

Giles Cooper OBE
- Occupations: promoter (entertainment), music promoter, producer
- Website: gcelive.com

Giles Richard Cooper OBE is a British entertainment producer, concert promoter and marketer. He is managing director of Soho Media Group, based in the West End of London and CEO of Giles Cooper Entertainment t/a GCE Live. He is chairman of the Royal Variety Charity, and since 2010 has been one of the producers of its annual fund-raising event, the Royal Variety Performance.

Cooper was made a fellow of the Royal Society of Arts in 2006, and received the Freedom of the City of London in 2014.

== Work ==
Cooper worked for music magazines Melody Maker and New Musical Express, and in 1998 founded a marketing agency, Media Junction.

Cooper was a volunteer with the Entertainment Artistes Benevolent Fund – now known as the Royal Variety Charity – from 2007. In 2010, he was elected chairman of the charity. He organises, and is one of the producers of, the Royal Variety Performance, an annual fundraising event. In 2015, Cooper was one of the producers of a Sunday Night at the London Palladium show with Des O'Connor and Jimmy Tarbuck to raise funds for the charity.

Cooper has promoted music tours for bands such as Placebo and the Happy Mondays and theatre and spoken-word tours for BBC TV presenters such as Simon Reeve and Dan Snow.

Cooper is also well known for presenting and producing outdoor concerts in the grounds of English Heritage and other stately homes such as Kenwood House on London's Hampstead Heath and Audley End House and Gardens in Saffron Walden, Essex.

He has also produced shows for artists such as Kris Kristofferson, Alfie Boe, Hacienda Classical, Orbital and Leftfield, José Carreras, the Human League, ABC, and the Jacksons.

== Controversy ==
In July 2026, GCE Live — the company run by Cooper — cancelled all three of that summer's HeritageLive festivals with as little as eleven days' notice before the first show. The Sandringham leg alone had sold tickets for a five-day, 30,000-capacity event headlined by Janet Jackson, Lionel Richie, Christina Aguilera and Eric Clapton; festivals at Audley End and Englefield, featuring acts including Scissor Sisters and Richard Ashcroft, were scrapped in the same announcement.

== Recognition ==
- Fellow of the Royal Society of Arts, 2006.
- Freedom of the City of London, 2014.
