= Aline Waites =

English actress and writer

- Born: Kingston upon Hull
- Occupations: Actress; Director; Producer; Reviewer; Writer

Aline Waites is an English actress, director, producer, reviewer and writer.

== Life and career ==
Aline Waites was born in Kingston upon Hull in c.1932, educated at Froebel House School, and studied for the theatre at Webber Douglas Academy. Before her grown-up training, she was already skilled in dancing, singing and modelling, and had written a prize-winning comedy.

On graduation, she won the silver medal and a BBC contract, and at the BBC worked with famous actors of the day, including John Gielgud, to whose Ernest Worthing she played Cecily in The Importance of Being Earnest. She played Gwen, the daughter of Mrs Dale, for many years in the BBC's famous fictional diarist in Mrs Dale's Diary, later known as The Dales. Her mother was first played by Ellis Powell, and later by Jessie Matthews. Latterly, single-again Gwen took increased prominence as the parental characters aged, with her choice of new husband a major cliff-hanger just before the serial ended.

As a stage actress, Waites did many tours and seasons, including Rep at Torquay, Bournemouth, Southampton and Bangor in Northern Ireland. Favourite roles were Marilyn Monroe in The White Whore, Jane Eyre and Melanie in Gone with the Wind 2.

On television, Waites debuted as Lottie in The Puppet Master, a live transmission in 1956. She played Nurse Joan Edwards in Emergency Ward 10, was in A Life of Bliss, and other drama productions.

Waites started Aba Daba Music Hall, the first fully professional pub theatre company, at the Mother Redcap, Camden Town, and from 1970 at the Pindar of Wakefield Theatre in Gray’s Inn Road. This venue (now the Water Rats) was purpose-built for the company. In 1980 Waites produced a political twice nightly revue for Kennedy's in the Kings Road called Downstairs at Kennedy's. A new project at Underneath The Arches in Southwark, begun in 1991, continued until 1996. The music hall performances were at first traditional, but soon became well known for their radical nature.

Her life partner for many years was Robin Hunter. With him, Waites created political pantomimes each year for the Pindar, The Arches and the Canal Cafe Theatre. Together they wrote twenty five shows. With Hunter and John Gould, she wrote Hit the Fan or Not the News Revue, performed at the Canal Cafe.

Waites wrote Stairway to Paradise, a musical biography of Marilyn Monroe, with music arranged by David Wykes, which was performed at The Arches and the Canal Cafe. She has organised large charity performances at venues including The Old Vic, the Shaftesbury Theatre, the May Fair Theatre and Charing Cross Music Hall, in addition to shows in Scandinavia, France, Germany, Canada, and the USA. Her company did three summer seasons in Copenhagen, and toured major cities in Denmark many times throughout the seventies.

Presentations included Gone with the Wind 2 (nineteen productions in various venues) and Road to Casablanca, which were written with Robin Hunter and David Kelsey. Fanny's Revenge ,with music by Jeff Clarke and Death on the Isle, with music by Antony Feldman, were Waites/Hunter musical comedies. Non-music theatre was represented by her production of Pinter's The Birthday Party for a tour of Denmark. She has also written comedy sketches for the younger generation, including the Brighton Revue Company.

She co-wrote, with Hunter and Wykes, The Illustrated Victorian Songbook (Michael Joseph, 1985). Her novel, A Thing Called Joe, was published in 2016, soon followed by She That Plays the Queen.

As a director of plays, her productions include Waiting in the Wings, Noël Coward's play set in an actress's retirement home – with a cast of eighteen on a small stage – as well as Coward's Still Life and Red Peppers.

Waites has been a reviewer and interviewer for Plays and Players national theatre magazine, and other journals. She has also reviewed for the Ham and High (the Hampstead and Highgate Express), for Remotegoat, and elsewhere. She took a BA (Hons) literary degree from the Open University in 2005.

Waites was for several years on the North West Branch Committee of Equity. She is also a member of Writers and Artists, the Actors' Benevolent Fund, Writers' Guild of Great Britain and Musical Theatre Network.

== Sources ==
- Radio Times Archive, BBC Caversham
- Theatre World Annual ed by Frances Stephens, pub Rockliff, London, successive years
- The Stage Yearbook pub Carson & Comerford, London, successive years
- Radio Times Annual pub BBC 1956, pp 44–47: Round the Dale Country
- Mrs Dale's Diary: Gwen's Love Story pub Chambers, London & Edinburgh, and BBC 1961
- The Illustrated Victorian Songbook by Hunter, Waites & Wykes, pub Michael Joseph 1985
