= You Know What Sailors Are (1954 film) =

1954 film

- Directed by: Ken Annakin
- Written by: Peter Rogers
- Based on: Sylvester by Edward Hyams
- Produced by: Peter Rogers; Julian Wintle
- Starring: Akim Tamiroff; Donald Sinden; Sarah Lawson; Naunton Wayne
- Cinematography: Reginald H. Wyer
- Edited by: Alfred Roome
- Music by: Malcolm Arnold
- Production company: Group Film Productions
- Distributed by: General Film Distributors
- Release date: 9 February 1954
- Running time: 89 minutes
- Country: United Kingdom
- Language: English
- Budget: $250,000 or £190,000

You Know What Sailors Are is a 1954 British comedy film directed by Ken Annakin and starring Donald Sinden, Michael Hordern, Bill Kerr, Dora Bryan and Akim Tamiroff. The screenplay by Peter Rogers was based on the 1951 novel Sylvester by Edward Hyams. It was shot at Pinewood Studios and on location around the Isle of Portland. The film's sets were designed by the art director George Provis.

== Plot ==
Three British naval officers out on a drunken spree attach a pram and a pawnbroker's sign to the stern of a foreign naval ship. The next morning, an officer misinterprets the pram and sign as state of the art, top-secret radar equipment. Instantly, the British navy decrees that their ships be fitted with the same device. Thereafter, bureaucratic misunderstandings escalate into a major international incident.

== Cast ==
- Akim Tamiroff as President of Agraria
- Donald Sinden as Lt. Sylvester Green
- Sarah Lawson as Betty
- Naunton Wayne as Captain Owbridge
- Bill Kerr as Lt. Smart
- Dora Bryan as Gladys
- Martin Miller as Prof. Hyman Pfumbaum
- Michael Shepley as Admiral
- Michael Hordern as Captain Hamilton
- Ferdy Mayne as Stanislaus Voritz of Smorznigov
- Bryan Coleman as Lt. Comdr. Voles
- Cyril Chamberlain as Stores Officer
- Hal Osmond as Stores Petty Officer
- Peter Arne as Ahmed
- Sara Leighton as Jasmin
- Janet Richards as Almyra
- Eileen Sands as Hepzibah
- Marianne Stone as Elsie – Barmaid
- Peter Dyneley as Lt. Andrews
- Peter Martyn as Lt. Ross
- Robertson Hare as Lt. Cdr. (Experimental Station)
- Anthony Sharp as Humphrey - Naval Attache
- Leslie Phillips as Embassy Secretary
- Peter Barkworth as Naval Lieutenant
- Martin Benson as Agrarian Officer
- Shirley Eaton as Palace Girl (uncredited)
- Lisa Gastoni as Palace Girl (uncredited)
- Shirley Burniston as Palace Girl (uncredited)
- Sonia Bendi as Palace Girl (uncredited)
- Ann Miller as Palace Girl (uncredited)
- Carol Day as Palace Girl (uncredited)
- Valerie Jene as Palace Girl (uncredited)
- Shirley Lorrimer as Palace Girl (uncredited)
- Lynne Cole as Palace Girl (uncredited)
- Jeanette Richards as Palace Girl (uncredited)
- Pat Webb as Palace Girl (uncredited)
- Jill Fenson as Palace Girl (uncredited)
- Hermione Harvey as Dancer
- Aleta Morrison as Dancer (uncredited)

== Original novel ==
Edward Hyams' novel Sylvester was published in 1951. The Observer called it "extremely funny." Film rights were bought by Peter Rogers.

== Production ==
Ken Annakin had been idle under his contract with Rank when his old mentor Sydney Box suggested he collaborate with Rogers who was working on "a crazy comedy set in an Arabian Nights kind of country. Most of the action took place around a sheik's desert palace. 'I’m sure the two of you together can make a glamorous, risqué, escapist comedy-adventure,' said Sydney."

Peter Rogers says he wrote 14 drafts of the script before Earl St. John, head of production at Rank, agreed to make the film. Rogers said in his biography he wanted Kenneth More to star but St. John refused to let him play any of the three male leads (Genevieve had been made but was yet to be released) so Donald Sinden was cast instead. Kenneth More wrote in his memoirs that he wanted to make the movie but he was offered the same fee as Genevieve and his agent asked for more, which Rank refused to pay, so he declined. Annakin wrote in his memoirs that neither Kenneth More or Dirk Bogarde wanted to play the lead so they cast Sinden who "had a good sense of comedy and timing, but it put us in the Second Division, so to speak!" However the director liked working with Bill Kerr and Akim Tamiroff.

Peter Rogers did the bulk of producing. However he says Julian Wintle was under contract to Rank and Earl St. John and Ken Annakin agreed for the film to be produced through Wintle's company. This annoyed Rogers who vowed never to work with Annakin again.

Filming started on 12 June 1953. The working titles of the film were Sylvester, 998 and Sailors Have a Way With Them.

Annakin wrote "As though to punish the Rank Organisation and to get even with them for not having given me a big movie such as The Million Dollar Bank Note... or The Purple Plain... I demanded the right to build the most fanciful Arabian palace, with gilded arches and white fluted columns, such as the Pinewood construction shop had never been asked for!" Production designer Peter Lamont called this "the biggest set ever been built at Pinewood and I think the budget came in at £29,000, and everybody almost shit themselves."

== Reception ==
Annakin said "the film did good average business in the UK... but for me You Know What Sailors Are stands out as the movie on which I discovered that farce is not my strongest talent! I know how to build scenes to release the ‘big laugh’, but I prefer to rely on sly humour, and on comedy arising from the observation of the funny things people do in real life."

More wrote, "When I went to the film, and saw how the book had been messed around, I offered up a prayer of thanks that I hadn’t been in it after all. I think poor Donald did extremely well in the circumstances."

=== Critical reception ===
Sight and Sound called it a "lively comedy aimed at bureaucratic gullibility; palls only when it sets out to be piquant."

Variety wrote "Lush Technicolor, luscious girls in an eastern harem and a neatly sustained joke about a naval hoax are the main boxoffice ingredients of this new British comedy which looks set for healthy returns in the home market."

TV Guide writes, "beautiful women fill the screen at frequent intervals in this amiable comedy"; and AllMovie writes, "You Know What Sailors Are top-bills Akim Tamiroff as the president of a mythical Foreign country, but the film belongs to Donald Sinden as the well-meaning young officer who precipitates the whole affair." FilmInk argued the movie has "an endearing desire to please and technical competency" but "lack something."

== Citations ==
- Annakin, Ken (2001). So you wanna be a director?. Tomahawk Press.
