= Ernest Morris =

English film director (1913–1987)

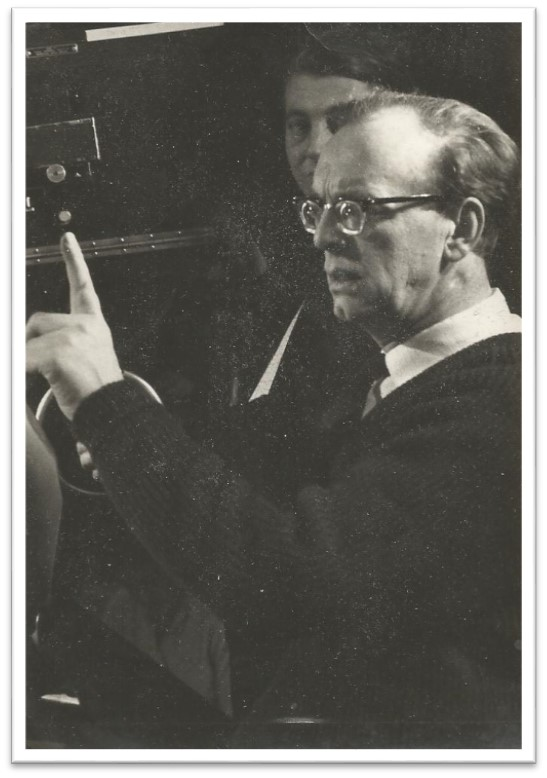
- Born: 17 October 1913; London, England
- Died: 17 September 1987 (aged 73); Cornwall, England
- Occupation: film director

Ernest Morris (17 October 1913 – 17 September 1987) was an English film and television director.

He began his film career in 1932 as an assistant director.

As a director the majority of his output comprised second features.

== Filmography ==
- Operation Murder (1957)
- Three Sundays to Live (1957)
- The Betrayal (1957)
- Son of a Stranger (1957)
- A Woman of Mystery (1958)
- On the Run (1958)
- Three Crooked Men (1958)
- Night Train for Inverness (1960)
- Transatlantic (1960)
- The Tell-Tale Heart (1960)
- Strip Tease Murder (1961)
- Highway to Battle (1961)
- Tarnished Heroes (1961)
- The Court Martial of Major Keller (1961)
- Operation Stogie (1962)
- Three Spare Wives (1962)
- What Every Woman Wants (1962)
- The Spanish Sword (1962)
- Night Cargoes (children's film series, 1962)
- Echo of Diana (1963)
- Five have a Mystery to Solve (children's film series, 1964)
- The Sicilians (1963)
- Shadow of Fear (1964)
- The Return of Mr. Moto (1965)

== Television ==
- The Vise (1955–1957, 55 eps)
- White Hunter (1957, 18 eps)
- The Adventures of William Tell (1958–1959, eps 12, 28, 34, 35, 37, 39)
- Man from Interpol (1960, eps 6,10)
- Richard the Lionheart (1962–1963, 39eps)
- The Saint (1963, series 2 ep 6)
