= Reginald Marsh (actor) =

English actor (1926–2001)

- Born: Reginald Albert Saltmarsh; 17 September 1926; London, England
- Died: 9 February 2001 (aged 74); Ryde, Isle of Wight, England
- Resting place: Ryde Cemetery, Ryde, Isle of Wight, England
- Years active: 1947–1998
- Spouses: Jenifer Coverdale (1949–?; divorced); Rosemary Murray (m. 1960)
- Children: 6

Reginald Albert Saltmarsh, known by the stage name Reginald Marsh (17 September 1926 – 9 February 2001), was an English actor who is best remembered for supporting roles in many television sitcoms from the 1970s onwards.

== Early life and career ==
Marsh was born in London in 1926 and he grew up on the Sussex coast at Worthing. After he left school he worked in a bank. After realising how serious he was about acting, his father introduced him to a retired actress, who introduced him to an agent who got his first acting role, at the age of 16, as a juvenile in Eden End by J. B. Priestley. He then worked in rep.

In 1958, he started working behind the scenes of Granada Television, but he soon went back to acting. From the 1960s he appeared in many films, including The Day the Earth Caught Fire (1961), Jigsaw (1962), Berserk! (1967), The Ragman's Daughter (1972), Young Winston (1972) and The Best Pair of Legs in the Business (1973), and on television, in such series as Dixon of Dock Green, Z-Cars and The Persuaders!. He also played bookie Dave Smith in Coronation Street on and off from 1962 to 1976.

Marsh played works general manager Arthur Sugden in the boardroom drama The Plane Makers (1963–64). He also appeared in The Champions (1968), Hine (1971), The Stone Tape (1972), Emmerdale Farm (1973), Crown Court (1973–74), QB VII (1974), Bless This House (1974), The Sweeney (1975), and The Duchess of Duke Street (1976). From 1975, Marsh played Jerry Leadbetter's boss, managing director of JJM, in several episodes of The Good Life. He played a similar role in George and Mildred from 1976 to 1979, as Humphrey Pumphrey, Mildred's brother-in-law. From 1979 to 1987, Marsh played another similar role, Sir Dennis Hodge, Terry's boss, in Terry and June later reuniting with June Whitfield in the 1992 sitcom Terry and Julian, where he played Terry's boss George Wilson. From 1981 to 1985, Marsh played Reg Lamont in the soap opera Crossroads.

His play The Death is Announced ("A Murder Play") was produced in Leeds in 1964. He played Inspector Cullen. He described the play as a "comedy who-dun-it" and said that he wrote it "because he could never find a good 'copper' part for himself."

== Later life ==
In the 1980s and 1990s, Marsh had many small roles on television, including appearing in Only When I Laugh, Home to Roost, Bergerac, Boon, Minder, Alleyn Mysteries and Terry and June. One of his last television roles was in an episode of Paul Merton in Galton & Simpson's... aired on 14 October 1997.

Reginald Marsh was married to actress Rosemary Murray, and they had four children. Marsh had two other children by his first marriage, to actress Jenifer Coverdale. One of his sons had Down’s Syndrome, and during his retirement on the Isle of Wight Reginald Marsh supported MENCAP. Marsh died at his home in Ryde on 9 February 2001, aged 74.

== Filmography ==
=== Film ===
Year	Title	Role	Notes
1959	The Ugly Duckling	Reporter	Uncredited
1961	The Day the Earth Caught Fire	Picture Editor	Uncredited
1961	The Pursuers	Inspector	
1962	Two Letter Alibi	Salcombe	
1962	Two and Two Make Six	Plainclothes Policeman	Uncredited
1962	Jigsaw	Hilders	Uncredited
1964	Shadow of Fear	Oliver	
1964	The Sicilians	Inspector Webb	
1965	It Happened Here	IA Medical Officer	
1967	Berserk!	Sgt. Hutchins	
1968	Headline Hunters	Bogshot	
1972	The Ragman's Daughter	George	
1972	Young Winston	Prince of Wales	
1973	The Best Pair of Legs in the Business	Fred	
1976	No Longer Alone	Producer	
1977	Sky Pirates	Eddie	
1987	Three Kinds of Heat	Sir Hugh	

== Selected television ==
Year	Title	Role	Notes
1947	The Man Who Came to Dinner	Westcott	Television film. First screen role
1957-66	ITV Play of the Week	Various	6 episodes
1959	The Army Game	Newspaper Reporter/Professor Steinberg	2 episodes
1959-61	Crime Sheet	Inspector Nicholson	3 episodes
1960-65	Here's Harry	Various	9 episodes
1961-62	The Cheaters	Inspector Martin	5 episodes
1961-63	BBC Sunday-Night Play	Murphy/Jack Vaughan	2 episodes
1962	Compact	Harry Kane	6 episodes. Also played Mr Connelly in one episode (1965)
1962-1973	Z-Cars	Various	6 episodes
1962-76	Coronation Street	Dave Smith	110 episodes. Also played Mr Lawther (1 episode, 1961)
1963	The Avengers	Higby	1 episode
1963	The Handy Gang	Colonel Capp-Fitzwearitt	9 episodes
1963-64	The Plane Makers	Arthur Sugden	18 episodes. Also played Wally in one episode (1963)
1964-65	Dixon of Dock Green	Frank Rogers/Mr Bellamy	2 episodes
1965	Armchair Theatre	Detective Inspector Wadcot	1 episode
1965	Emergency Ward 10	Councillor Vallance	3 episodes
1965	The Wednesday Play	Arthur	1 episode, "A Designing Woman"
1965	Scales of Justice	Harry Turner	1 episode "The Material Witness"
1965	Pardon the Expression	Mr Granger	1 episode
1966	The New Forest Rustlers	Inspector Foster	4 episodes
1966-67	The Baron	Chief Inspector Filmer/Captain Brenner	Filmer, 1 episode; Brenner, 2 episodes
1966-67	The Rat Catchers	Arthur Dent/Barlow	Barlow, 1 episode; Dent, 3 episodes
1967	Mrs Thursday	Herbert Blakey	3 episodes
1967	The Big M	Seymour Tancred	6 episodes
1968	The Newcomers	Jack Stebbings	6 episodes
1968	The Saint	Ed Brown	1 episode
1968	The Champions	Captain Conrad Schultz	1 episode
1968-69	The Old Campaigner	L.B.	6 episodes
1969	Randall and Hopkirk (Deceased)	James Laker	1 episode: When Did You Start to Stop Seeing Things?
1970	ITV Sunday Night Theatre	Inspector Pennycuick	1 episode
1970	Never Say Die	Mr Hebden	6 episodes
1970	Thirty-Minute Theatre	Mr Wilson	1 episode
1971	Hine	Charles Bulfitt	1 episode
1971	The Persuaders!	Dr Fowler	1 episode
1972	The Stone Tape	William Crawshaw	Television film
1972-73	Harriet's Back in Town	Harvey Tyler	8 episodes
1973	Emmerdale Farm	Bob Molesworth	6 episodes
1973	Crown Court (TV series)	Charles Baker/ John Stainsby	3 episodes of each, in 1973/'74.
1973	ITV Sunday Night Theatre	Jack Cooper	1 episode
1974	Bless This House	Mr Parker	1 episode
1974	Comedy Playhouse	Arnold	Episode "A Girl's Best Friend"
1974	My Name is Harry Worth	George Bailey	2 episodes
1974	QB VII	Inspector Henderson	1 episode
1974	Whodunnit?	Det.Insp. Frank Dell	Episode: "It's Quicker By Train"
1974-75	How's Your Father?	Mr Winterbottom	8 episodes
1975	The Sweeney	Arnold Foss	1 episode
1975-77	The Good Life	Sir Andrew	6 episodes
1976	The Ghosts of Motley Hall	Mr. Wallis	Episode: "Bad Lord William and the British Banana Company"
1976	Rogue's Rock	Scoop	3 episodes
1976	The Duchess of Duke Street	Mr Atkinson	1 episode
1976-78	George & Mildred	Humphrey Pumphrey	7 episodes
1977	Midnight is a Place	Silas Hobday	5 episodes
1978	Rumpole of the Bailey	Mr Myers	1 episode
1979-80	The Ravelled Thread	Higby	6 episodes
1979-87	Terry and June	Sir Dennis Hodge	25 episodes
1980	The Two Ronnies	Cheryl	2 episodes
1980-85	The Setbacks	Mr Everybody	21 episodes
1981	Only When I Laugh	Sir Julian Briggs	1 episode
1981	Scarf Jack	Sir William Wynne	6 episodes
1981-82	Crossroads	Reg Lamont	59 episodes. Also played Noel Lamont (5 episodes, 1980)
1984	Minder	Johnny Winstanley	1 episode
1985	Mann's Best Friends	Mr. Beasley	1 episode
1986	Home to Roost	Jim Brown	1 episode
1988-90	Bread	Doctor	5 episodes. Also played Mr Rachel (1 episode, 1987)
1989	Bergerac	Arnold Trowbridge	1 episode
1989	Boon	George Boxall	1 episode
1990	The Inspector Alleyn Mysteries	Colonel Pascoe	1 episode
1992	Terry and Julian	Mr Wilson	1 episode
1993	KYTV	Undertaker	1 episode
1995	Searching	Chancy's father	3 episodes
1997	Paul Merton in Galton and Simpson's...	Uncle George	1 episode: "Being Sound of Mind"
1997-98	Mr Wymi	Henry	29 episodes. Final screen role

=== Radio ===
Year	Title	Role	Notes
1951	Richard II	Keeper	First radio role
1962	Saturday Night Theatre	Jack Vaughan	"The Mather Story"
1963	Every Pebble on the Beach	Willie Smith	
1965	Afternoon Theatre	Tom Walker	"Border of Barbarity"
1972	Afternoon Theatre	Joe	"And You, Arnold"
1977	Albert and Me	Mr Simpson	Episode: "Spanner in the Works"
1978	Malcolm	Mr Parker	"Malcolm and a House"
1978	Share and Share Alike	Managing Director	2 episodes
1978	Wireless Wonderland	Himself	
1979	Rush Hour	Himself	
1981	The Monday Play	Allenby	"Ross"
1984	It Sticks Out Half a Mile	Sir Wensley Smithers	Episode: "War Damage"
1985	Saturday-Night Theatre	Dr Elston	"A Bumper Year for Dahlias"
1987-89	Blandings	Sir Gregory Parsloe	Various
1987	Crime at Christmas	Chief-Inspector Mitchell	"Inspector French and the Starvel Tragedy"
1989	Saturday-Night Theatre	Desmond Dean	"The Deep End"
1989	The Hedge Priest	Sir Philip Bowfounder	
1992	Butterflies Don't Count	Peter	First of two-part drama
1992	The Broken Butterfly	Peter	Second of two-part drama
1992	Thirty-Minute Theatre	Sir George	"The Rhino and the Love Pavilion"
1998	The Saturday Play	Major Crowe	"The Black Spectacles"
