= Damaris Hayman =

British actress (1929–2021)

- Born: Damaris Ann Kennedy Hayman; 16 June 1929; Kensington, London, England
- Died: 3 June 2021 (aged 91); Gloucester, Gloucestershire, England
- Occupation: Actress

Damaris Ann Kennedy Hayman (16 June 1929 – 3 June 2021) was an English actress, often cast in upper class or eccentric roles. She made numerous performances in films and television series from the 1950s onwards.

== Early life ==
Hayman was born in Kensington, London, England, the only child of Percival, a barrister, and Vera Hayman (née Kennedy). The family relocated to Nelson in Lancashire when Hayman was still young before moving again to Cheltenham where Hayman was educated at Cheltenham Ladies' College. Until the age of eighteen, Hayman attended local drama classes before going to the Royal Academy of Music and gaining a qualification in teaching.

== Career ==
After repertory work in the theatre, Hayman made her film début in The Belles of St Trinian's (1954) in an uncredited role as a sixth former. The Telegraph obituary writer recalled Hayman, "with her toothy, jolly-hockey-sticks, quintessentially English persona", sometimes being compared to the female star of that film, Joyce Grenfell. In a touring production of The Importance of Being Earnest she played a parlour maid and was the understudy for Margaret Rutherford, who was cast as Lady Bracknell. The two women became very close and Hayman supported Rutherford in her last years.

Predominantly appearing in comedy, Hayman became the foil for many famous comedians including Sid James, Tommy Cooper, Dick Emery, Les Dawson, and Morecambe and Wise.

Apart from scores of small parts, Hayman appeared in the Doctor Who serial The Dæmons (1971) as Miss Hawthorne, the self-proclaimed White Witch of the village Devil's End. Doctor Who, the Television Companion described her character as, "very memorable," and praised Hayman as being "perfectly cast in the role, her engaging performance adding much to the story". Hayman also appeared in such comedies as Steptoe and Son, Love Thy Neighbour, The Young Ones, One Foot In The Grave and Sez Les. She worked with Ronnie Barker, appearing in one episode of his final series, Clarence (1988) as well as appearing in The Liver Birds (1971) and in the 1986 Duty Free Christmas special.

Hayman also appeared in many films including Bitter Harvest (1963), Smokescreen (1964), Bunny Lake Is Missing (1965), Mutiny on the Buses (1972), Love Thy Neighbour (1973), Man About the House (1974), Confessions of a Driving Instructor (1976) and The Pink Panther Strikes Again (1976).

After appearing in a sketch in Tony Hancock's last British TV series in 1967, Hayman became a close friend of the comedian in the remaining year of his life. She also reprised her role of Miss Hawthorne in the six-part straight-to-DVD drama White Witch of Devil's End (2017) which began production in 2012.

== Death ==
Hayman died on 3 June 2021, aged 91.

== Selected filmography ==
- The Belles of St. Trinian's (1954) – Sixth former (uncredited)
- Greyfriars Bobby: The True Story of a Dog (1961) – Black-haired woman (uncredited)
- Only Two Can Play (1962) – Lady Committee Member (uncredited)
- West 11 (1963) – Guide with School Party (uncredited)
- Bitter Harvest (1963) – Neighbour in Flat (uncredited)
- Smokescreen (1964) – Mrs Roper's Nurse (uncredited)
- Bunny Lake Is Missing (1965) – Daphne
- Steptoe and Son: "My Old Man's a Tory" (TV 1965) – Karen Frobisher
- Ours Is a Nice House (1970, TV series) – Louise Bottomley
- Doctor Who: The Dæmons (TV 1971) – Miss Hawthorne
- The Magnificent Six and 1/2: The Ski Wheelers (1971)
- Mutiny on the Buses (1972) – Mrs Jenkins
- Anoop and the Elephant (1972) – Miss Flint
- Love Thy Neighbour (1973) – Woman on Bus
- Paganini Strikes Again (1973) – Miss Lanyard
- Man About the House (1974) – Old Lady (uncredited)
- Confessions of a Driving Instructor (1976) – Tweedy Golfing Lady
- The Pink Panther Strikes Again (1976) – Fiona
- Full Circle (1977) – Miss Pinner
- The Missionary (1982) – Lady Quimby
- One Foot in the Grave (TV 1992, 1995) – Elderly Lady/Receptionist
- If You See God, Tell Him (TV 1993) – Singer
