= When Did You Start to Stop Seeing Things? =

- Randall and Hopkirk (Deceased) episode
- Episode no.: Season 1 Episode 10
- Directed by: Jeremy Summers
- Written by: Tony Williamson
- Production code: 10
- Original air date: 23 November 1969

Guest appearances
- Clifford Evans; Keith Barron; Philip James; Basil Dignam; Reginald Marsh; Peter Stephens; Bessie Love

Episode chronology
← Previous "The House on Haunted Hill"	Next → "The Ghost Who Saved the Bank at Monte Carlo"

"When Did You Start to Stop Seeing Things?" is the tenth episode of the 1969 ITC British television series Randall and Hopkirk (Deceased) starring Mike Pratt, Kenneth Cope and Annette Andre. The episode, directed by Jeremy Summers, was first broadcast on 23 November 1969 on ITV.

== Synopsis ==
Jeff is hired by a company to find out who is leaking information in the stock market. Finding Jeff suspiciously out of character – and also now being unable to see him – Marty finds out that the real Jeff has been captured and that the fake Jeff is an impostor, using his status to conduct murders of financial personnel. Marty uses a hypnotist to save the day.

== Cast ==
- Mike Pratt as Jeff Randall
- Kenneth Cope as Marty Hopkirk
- Annette Andre as Jeannie Hopkirk
- Keith Barron as Jarvis
- Basil Dignam as Hepple
- Rosemary Donnelly as Diana
- David Downer as Hinch
- Clifford Evans as Sir Oliver Norenton
- John Garvin as Tully
- Philip James as Holly
- Bessie Love as Mrs. Trotter
- Reginald Marsh as James Laker
- Peter Stephens as Sir Timothy Grange
- David Stoll as Tilvers

== Home media ==
The episode was released on VHS and several times on DVD with differing special features. A Blu-ray edition of this episode has been released by Network along with several significant episodes of several TV series of the 1970 era under the title Retro-Action 1 – The cool age of TV in High Definition.
