= Strip Tease Murder =

1961 British film by Ernest Morris

- Original British lobby card
- Directed by: Ernest Morris
- Written by: Paul Tabori
- Produced by: Edward J. Danziger; Harry Lee Danziger; Ralph Ingram
- Starring: John Hewer; Ann Lynn
- Cinematography: Paddy Aherne
- Edited by: Derek Parsons
- Music by: Bill LeSage
- Production company: Danziger Productions
- Distributed by: Paramount British Pictures (UK)
- Release date: March 1961 (UK)
- Running time: 66 minutes
- Country: United Kingdom
- Language: English

Strip Tease Murder (also known as Striptease Murder) is a low budget 1961 British second feature film thriller directed by Ernest Morris and starring John Hewer and Ann Lynn. It was written by Paul Tabori and produced by The Danzigers.

== Plot ==
Diana, a stripper, collapses and dies during a dance routine on stage at the Flamingo Club. When her death is ruled to be due to natural causes, her husband, comedian and compere Bert Black, turns detective to investigate when he discovers suspicious circumstances but the police are not convinced and refuse to pursue the matter. Black comes to suspect Diana was killed accidentally rather than the person who was the real target and sets out to prove it.

== Cast ==
- John Hewer as Bert
- Ann Lynn as Rita
- Jean Muir as Diana
- Vanda Hudson as Angelin
- Kenneth J. Warren as Branco
- Carl Duering as Rocco
- Michael Peake as Martin
- Leon Cortez as Lou
- Peter Elliot as Perkel
- Trevor Reid as Inspector Forbes
- Christine Child, Judy Collins, Janet Hall and Lita Howard as Flamingo dancers
- Mitzi Bardot, Vicki Grey, Margo Mitchell and Shari as Flamingo showgirls
- Robert Mooney as mechanic
- Robert Crewdson as Andy
- Michael Blake as Mike
- Walter Horsbrugh as doctor

== Critical reception ==
The Monthly Film Bulletin wrote: "A combination of modest murder mystery and mild striptease club acts, this unassuming production has little to recommend it except the unexpectedly good characterisation of the tragedy-hit but persevering Bert."

Kine Weekly wrote: "Combining the suspense of a murder plot with the 'delights' of strip-tease is quite an idea, and it has been pretty well done. ... The fairly straightforward plot has been told in a straightforward way, without any real attempt at creating a mystery, and the strip tease intervals at the club are quite naturally slotted into the amateur detection."
