= Petticoat Pirates =

1961 British film by David MacDonald

- Film poster
- Directed by: David MacDonald
- Written by: T.J. Morrison; Lew Schwarz; Charlie Drake
- Produced by: Gordon L.T. Scott
- Starring: Charlie Drake; Anne Heywood; Cecil Parker; John Turner
- Cinematography: Gilbert Taylor
- Edited by: Ann Chegwidden
- Music by: Don Banks
- Production company: Associated British Picture Corporation
- Distributed by: Warner-Pathé Distributors
- Release dates: 30 November 1961 (London premiere); 19 December 1961 (general release)
- Running time: 87 minutes
- Country: United Kingdom
- Language: English

Petticoat Pirates is a 1961 British comedy film directed by David MacDonald and starring Charlie Drake, Anne Heywood, Cecil Parker, John Turner and Thorley Walters. It was written by T.J. Morrison, Lew Schwarz and Drake. The film had its premiere on 30 November 1961 at the Warner Theatre in London's West End.

== Plot ==
Wren Officer Anne Stevens and the 150 girls under her command are piqued. On the grounds that Wrens can do anything that men can do, at least as well or better, they demand the right to serve at sea in warships. When their request is turned down by the authorities they board a frigate, imprison the skeleton crew, and set off to sea, where they unintentionally become embroiled in a training exercise between British and US fleets...

== Cast ==
- Charlie Drake as Charlie
- Anne Heywood as Chief Officer Anne Stevens
- Cecil Parker as Commander-in-Chief
- John Turner as Lieutenant Michael Pattinson
- Thorley Walters as Captain Jerome Robertson
- Maxine Audley as Mary, Superintendent
- Eleanor Summerfield as Chief Wren Mabel Rawlins
- Victor Maddern as Chief Petty Officer Nixon
- Lionel Murton as Admiral
- Barbara Hicks as physical training instructress
- Kenneth Fortescue as Paul Turner
- Dilys Laye as Sue
- Penny Newington as Elizabeth
- Michael Ripper as Tug
- Anton Rodgers as Alec
- Murray Melvin as Kenneth
- Angus Lennie as George
- Tony Hilton as Pincher
- Michael Henry as Jumper
- Norman Chappell as Johnson
- James Milner as Chips
- Diane Aubrey as gunnery officer
- Daphne Jonason as navigating officer
- James Villiers as English Lieutenant
- Kim Tracy as mess attendant
- Jemma Hyde as Carole
- Susan Castle as Mandy
- Patricia Garwood as Wren in linen store
- Aleta Morrison as frog girl
- Jacqueline Jones as frog girl
- Diana Potter as frog girl
- Priscilla Morgan as Wren on mess deck

== Production ==
It was Anne Heywood's first film after leaving the Rank Organisation.

== Reception ==
=== Box office ===
According to Kinematograph Weekly the film was considered a "money maker" at the British box office in 1962.

=== Critical ===
The Monthly Film Bulletin wrote: "Two sequences, one involving Charlie Drake's activities in the boiler room, the other a nightmare in which he plays all the parts from prisoner to judge in a navy court-martial, have the berserk lunacy of some of Drake's television shows: the humour is crude but vigorous. The rest of the film is in the worst traditions of British farce – flat-footed, ineffectual and coy."

Variety wrote: "The screenplay is flabby and dialog mainly flat. It seems that director David MacDonald was trying not to let Drake monopolize the action, and the result is an uneasy mixture of slapstick and straight comedy. Of the remainder of the cast, Miss Heywood looks pretty, but unconvincing as the chief raider. Cecil Parker offers another of his well-timed studies in pomposity while John Turner makes a stalwart, pleasant hero. ... Regrettably it must be recorded that Petiicoats Pirates provides too few laughs on the ocean wave."

Leslie Halliwell called the film an: "uncertain comedy fantasy."

The Radio Times Guide to Films gave the film 1/5 stars, writing: "In his third tilt at movie stardom, TV comic Charlie Drake again finds himself up a well-known creek without a script. This time, however, he's only got himself to blame, as he co-wrote this woeful comedy, in which he plays a timid stoker ordered to disguise himself as a Wren in order to recover a battleship hijacked by a mutinous all-woman crew."
