= List of Richard the Lionheart episodes =

The following is a list of episodes of Richard the Lionheart, a family television show based loosely on the life of Richard I which aired between 1961 and 1963.

== Episodes ==
No. overall	No. in season	Title	Directed by	Written by	Original release date	U.K. viewers (millions)
1	1	"Long Live The King"	Ernest Morris	Mark Grantham	20 November 1961	N/A
Sir Philip de Brause brings Richard a message from the King - he is to proceed to Vendome to make a peace treaty with Catherine. But it is a trick and Richard is ambushed on the way.
2	2	"The Lion and The Eagle"	Ernest Morris	Paul Tabori and Stanley Miller	27 November 1961	N/A
Richard returns to London to prepare for his coronation only to find that his brother John has kidnapped the Queen Mother.
3	3	"The Robbers of Ashdown Forest"	Ernest Morris	Paul Tabori and Stanley Miller	4 December 1961	N/A
King Richard hears news that Prince John has inspired another rebellion in the North. Impulsively, he journeys to meet the threat without waiting for his army to gather.
4	4	"The Wolf of Banbury"	Ernest Morris	Paul Tabori and Stanley Miller	11 December 1961	N/A
Richard learns that Lord Giles of Banbury has been giving protection to fugitives from the law - and that he has captured for ransom the beautiful Lady Rosalie, betrothed to Sir Geoffrey.
5	5	"School For A King"	Ernest Morris	Paul Tabori and Stanley Miller	1 January 1962	N/A
Thinking hard on his late father's advice to be virtuous and honourable, Richard determines to learn more about his realms - setting out with his companions to roam the countryside in disguise.
6	6	"Crown In Danger"	Ernest Morris	Paul Tabori and Stanley Miller	8 January 1962	N/A
Three of Richard's prisoners escape and take Sir Gilbert with them as hostage. Richard and Blondel, with the aid of Tom the Tracker, set off in pursuit.
7	7	"The Pirate King"	Ernest Morris	Paul Tabori and Stanley Miller	15 January 1962	N/A
Richard's skill at chess and duelling is put to the test when he is challenged by notorious English pirate Forked Beard, self-styled King of the Northern seas.
8	8	"The Alchemist of Rouen"	Ernest Morris	Paul Tabori and Stanley Miller	18 December 1961	N/A
Lady Rosalie tells Richard that her fiance, Sir Geoffrey, is bewitched. Investigating, Richard and Blondel find Geoffrey in a trance-like state and follow him to an alchemist's house.
9	9	"The King's Champion"	Ernest Morris	Paul Tabori and Stanley Miller	22 January 1962	N/A
Sir Gilbert brings news that the Scots are about to invade, allied with Henry, Richard's elder brother. But Richard buried his brother several years previously and believes this "Henry" is a fraudulent pretender - part of a plan to usurp his kingdom.
10	10	"King Arthur's Sword"	Ernest Morris	Paul Tabori and Stanley Miller	29 January 1962	N/A
Richard refuses to believe that King Arthur's sword, Excalibur, has been stolen from its place at Glastonbury Abbey. Accompanied by Sir Gilbert and Sir Geoffrey he visits the tomb, where he finds a mysterious knight awaiting him with a message.
11	11	"The Challenge"	Ernest Morris	Paul Tabori and Stanley Miller	5 February 1962	N/A
Richard's knights are challenged by Zara, Princess of Granada, into a joust with her brother, Ubaldo - with her as the prize.
12	12	"The Bride"	Ernest Morris	Paul Tabori and Stanley Miller	12 February 1962	N/A
Pressed by counsellors to marry, Richard reluctantly agrees to take a cautious look at Princess Alice. Disguised as a troubadour, Richard rides to her home at Blanch-Garde castle - where his plans are disrupted.
13	13	"The Strange Monks of Latroun"	Ernest Morris	Stanley Miller	23 April 1962	N/A
Richard finds a boy murdered and a pilgrim robbed - both by the so-called "monks" of Latroun monastery. Masquerading as a known felon he rides to the monastery in an attempt to uncover the truth.
14	14	"The Great Enterprise"	Ernest Morris	David Nicholl	19 February 1962	N/A
Richard returns from his honeymoon to find the Saracens blockading Marseille. Then a letter from Saladin is found in Queen Berengaria's room, making it seem that she is a traitor.
15	15	"The Norman King"	Ernest Morris	David Nicholl	26 February 1962	N/A
New Year's Eve, 1191 - Richard and Berengaria are Tancred, King of Sicily's, guests of honour at a masqued ball. But court intrigue runs high and Tancred plots with Philip of France to have Richard killed.
16	16	"When Champions Meet"	Ernest Morris	David Nicholl	5 March 1962	N/A
Acre, Palestine. Prince John makes Philip of France an offer he can't refuse: he will gain all of Richard's French provinces if Richard himself dies in the Holy Land.
17	17	"The Warrior From Scotland"	Ernest Morris	Stanley Miller	12 March 1962	N/A
Kenneth Stewart, a young warrior, arrives at the Crusaders' camp determined to serve King Richard. Though his first duty seems easy it leads him to very grave trouble.
18	18	"The Conjurer"	Ernest Morris	Mark Grantham	19 March 1962	N/A
Ali, a Saracen youth with a flair for conjuring tricks but a fear of killing, is forced by his commanding officer to try to worm his way into Richard's confidence - and then assassinate him.
19	19	"The Lord of Kerak"	Ernest Morris	David Nicholl	26 March 1962	N/A
Richard and Sir Gilbert go to Kerak Castle to query the absence of Lord Arnold from the battle of Acre. Arnold, however, has conspired with Conrad of Montferrat to dispose of his unwelcome visitors.
20	20	"The Saracen Physician"	Ernest Morris	Stanley Miller	2 April 1962	N/A
Feverish and unwell, Richard lies ill and delirious in camp, attended by his doctor, Brother Simeon. But Simeon is one of Conrad of Montferrat's men, and Sir Kenneth is wary of his motives.
21	21	"A Marriage of Convenience"	Ernest Morris	Stanley Miller	9 April 1962	N/A
Richard pretends to oppose Lady Edith's marriage to Sir Kenneth and sends a proposal to Saladin that the Muslim ruler should be Edith's husband, consolidating peace between their armies.
22	22	"Queen in Danger"	Ernest Morris	David Nicholl	16 April 1962	N/A
During a truce in the hostilities, Queen Berengaria sets off on pilgrimage to pray for Richard's safety. But Conrad finds out and plots with a hostile Bedouin leader to kidnap her.
23	23	"Prince Otto"	Ernest Morris	Stanley Miller	30 April 1963	N/A
Prince Otto's castle bars the Crusaders' path and he demands ransom money to let them pass. Angry, and under pressure to capture Jerusalem, Richard plans to capture the castle.
24	24	"The Vision Fades"	Ernest Morris	Stanley Miller	29 March 1963	N/A
For long, weary months the Crusaders have striven to reach the Holy City - and now it lies at their feet. One last effort is needed, but there is jealousy and discord among the leaders of Christendom.
25	25	"The Fugitive"	Ernest Morris	Stanley Miller	12 April 1963	N/A
Duke Leopold of Austria sends the devious Count Rolf to murder Richard, who has been shipwrecked on his return from the Holy Land.
26	26	"Knight Errant At Large"	Ernest Morris	David Nicholl	26 April 1963	N/A
Richard is recognised while fleeing through Austria in disguise. Word is sent to local baron Lord Rudolf, who - along with his beautiful daughter - plans to capture Richard.
27	27	"Guardian of the Temple"	Ernest Morris	David Nicholl	10 May 1963	N/A
Richard, Hugo and Marta stop at a market town to buy horses - but Richard comes into conflict with the Knights Templar.
28	28	"Capture"	Ernest Morris	David Nicholl	24 May 1963	N/A
At the border of Duke Leopold's domain, and in sight of freedom, Richard is captured. To avoid war, Leopold must have him executed secretly - and at once!
29	29	"A King's Ransom"	Ernest Morris	David Nicholl	7 June 1963	N/A
Duke Leopold sets his ransom so high that Richard's subjects can scarcely raise it. But Prince John is determined to collect the quota - though not necessarily for Richard's benefit.
30	30	"The Devil is Unloosed"	Ernest Morris	David Nicholl	21 June 1963	N/A
Prince John is told by a gypsy fortune-teller that Richard is dead. He hurries back to England to proclaim himself king.
31	31	"The Little People of Lyntor"	Ernest Morris	Mark Grantham	5 July 1963	N/A
Richard is angered to discover falsified tax demands made in his name. Disguised as a tax-collector he sets a trap for Prince John to protect the Cornish folk from his rapacity.
32	32	"The Raiders"	Ernest Morris	Mark Grantham	19 July 1963	N/A
Richard and Sir Gilbert discover a dead body while out hunting - one of a group of gold robbers that have plagued the district for months. They learn of a local monastery that cares for destitute rough types and investigate in disguise.
33	33	"An Eye for An Eye"	Ernest Morris	Mark Grantham	2 August 1963	N/A
On a journey through England with his two companion knights, Richard is wounded and kidnapped by an old man with a grievance against the monarchy.
34	34	"The Caveman"	Ernest Morris	Mark Grantham	16 August 1963	N/A
All the wells within the domain of Richard's friend, Baron Brentlock, dry up - caused by a hermit's miraculous powers. He will reverse this drought at a price - the hand of Brentlock's daughter in marriage.
35	35	"A Year and A Day"	Ernest Morris	David Nicholl	30 August 1963	N/A
Years earlier, the son of Baron Fitzgeorge made a peasant take his place on Crusade. But when the young warrior returns home in glory, his survival risks revealing the plot.
36	36	"The Crown Jewels"	Ernest Morris	Mark Grantham	13 September 1963	N/A
The Queen's young cousin, who has come to England to learn his knightly duties, falls in with evil companions and is persuaded to take part in an audacious plot.
37	37	"The Man Who Sold Pardons"	Ernest Morris	David Nicholl	29 November 1963	N/A
Richard and Sir Gilbert are on the trail of Brother Nicholas, a professional pardoner whose sinister activities are being carried out in Richard's name under forged papers.
38	38	"The Heir of England"	Ernest Morris	David Nicholl	6 December 1963	N/A
Sir Gilbert, sent to Brittany to bring back Prince Arthur, England's young heir-apparent, is attacked and his place taken by a kidnapper.
39	39	"The People's King"	Ernest Morris	David Nicholl	13 December 1963	N/A
Preparations for Richard's second coronation are proceeding apace, but disgruntled factions who would have benefited from John's accession to the throne are busy plotting his regicide.
