= John Hewer =

English actor (1922–2008)

- John Hewer as Captain Birdseye
- Born: 13 January 1922; Leyton, Essex, England
- Died: 16 March 2008 (aged 86); Twickenham, London, England
- Occupations: Actor, business manager
- Spouse: Edna Vernon (m. 1943; died 1998)
- Children: 2

John Hewer (13 January 1922 – 16 March 2008) was an English-born stage and screen actor and business manager. He worked in his native United Kingdom, as well as the United States and Canada, and he became familiar with audiences for playing Captain Birdseye, in television commercials for frozen food's company Birds Eye.

== Biography ==
=== Early life ===
Hewer was born in Leyton, Essex, the son of an engine driver. He attended Leyton High School following which he worked for the Social Services Department for London County Council (LCC) dealing with people who had problems paying their rent. During World War II when he served as a navigator in the Fleet Air Arm, with which he travelled to Vancouver and the Caribbean and witnessed the result of the Hiroshima bombing. During the war Hewer performed with the Royal Naval Barracks’ Scran Bag, which entertained other service personnel.

=== Career ===
Hewer after being demobbed returned to working for LCC but feeling drawn to the stage he joined the Unity Theatre and became a stalwart of London's Players' Theatre where he appeared throughout his career including in musical theatrical productions such as Sail Away and Six of One in London's West End theatre. The highlight of his theatrical career was starring opposite Julie Andrews on Broadway, in musical The Boy Friend in the 1950s.

His television work included hosting the 1970s Canadian CTV variety series The Pig and Whistle, but his most familiar role was as the fictitious sailor Captain Birdseye, the mascot for Birds Eye frozen foods in scores of British TV commercials from 1967 to 1998. In a 1993 poll he was voted the most recognised naval captain after Captain Cook.

With the actor Mike Hall he set up Hewer and Hall, the first conference production company in the UK to use the American model of "show business for business". The company presented conferences, product launches, training films and cabarets in the UK and across Europe; it was active in the late 1960s and early 70s and counted IBM, Mobil, Volkswagen, Beechams, Gulf Oil and Birds Eye among its clients.

Hewer married Edna Vernon in 1943, who predeceased him in 1998. Residing in Epping in his later years and finally Brinsworth House in Twickenham, London, Hewer died aged 86 on 16 March 2008. He was survived by a son and daughter.

== Selected filmography ==
- The Dark Man (1951) – 1st Taxi Driver
- Assassin for Hire (1951) – Giuseppe Riccardi
- Law and Disorder (1958) – Foxy
- Strip Tease Murder (1961) – Bert Black
- Operation Stogie (1962)
- Three Spare Wives (1962) – Rupert
- Billy Budd (1962) – Dubbing
- Mister Ten Per Cent (1967) – Townsend
- Birds Eye adverts as Captain Birdseye (1967–1998)
- Home Before Midnight (1979) – Donelly
- Bruce Forsyth's Generation Game (25 December 1990) – Captain Birdseye
- Noel's House Party (13 March 1993) – Captain Birdseye
