= The Young Jacobites =

1960 children's film by John Reeve

- Still from the film
- Directed by: John Reeve
- Screenplay by: Paul Tabori
- Produced by: Anthony Gilkison
- Starring: Robert Haviland; Francesca Annis; Jeremy Bulloch; Frazer Hines
- Cinematography: Geoffrey Gurrin
- Edited by: John Reeve
- Music by: Albert Elms
- Production company: Bushey Studios
- Release date: 1959
- Running time: 14–20 minutes per episode
- Country: United Kingdom
- Language: English

The Young Jacobites is a 1959 British children's drama film serial directed by John Reeve and starring Robert Haviland, Francesca Annis and Jeremy Bulloch. The screenplay was by Paul Tabori. It was produced by Anthony Gilikson for the Children's Film Foundation.

== Plot ==
Two children on holiday on the Isle of Skye, Scotland, go back in time and help Bonnie Prince Charlie escape from Scotland to France. The story is in 8 parts:

Episode 1. "Journey into the Past"

Episode 2. "Traitor"

Episode 3. "League in Action"

Episode 4. "Ambush"

Episode 5. "Prince Must Be Warned"

Episode 6. "Rescue"

Episode 7. "Enemy Closes In"

Episode 8. "Over the Threshold"

== Cast ==
- Robert Haviland
- Francesca Annis as Jean
- Jeremy Bulloch as Hamish
- Frazer Hines as Angus
- John Pike as Willie
- Gareth Tandy as Alistair
- John Woodnutt as Lieutenant
- John Dearth as Sergeant
- Michael O'brien as Anderson
- David Steuart as Prince
- Michael Nightingale as Colonel
- Frank Forsythe as Laird
- Janet Barrow as Annie

== Critical reception ==
The Monthly Film Bulletin wrote: "Rather more adult in presentation than usual, this children's adventure serial is full of well-constructed excitement, and a spirit of adventure is evoked by admirable use of the Skye landscape and locations. The scale is also more lavish than in many serials, with a certain amount of genuine period atmosphere. The children are convincing in costume, the chase sequences amongst the Scottish mountains and loch-sides have sharp and credible suspense angles, and the photography is good. The comic soldier episodes are the one weak element, overlong and tending towards caricature, whereas the rest of the acting and writing is natural, unselfconscious and free of any temptation to impose Scotland too strongly."

Kine Weekly wrote: "Made on a more lavish scale than most children's serials, it contains plenty of action and, for once, the adult players are not overshadowed by the juveniles in a large cast. Excellent children's serial. ... Much more adult in presentation than is usual, the story is packed with well-contrived excitement which is strengthened by careful characterisation, natural dialogue and the effective direction of John Reeve. The suspense angles are sharp and always logical and the picture which was shot on Skye for the most part contains some admirable and attractive scenic backgrounds."
