= Echo of Diana =

1963 British film by Ernest Morris

- Theatrical release poster
- Directed by: Ernest Morris
- Screenplay by: Reginald Hearne
- Produced by: John I. Phillips
- Starring: Vincent Ball; Betty McDowall; Geoffrey Toone
- Cinematography: Walter J. Harvey
- Production company: Butcher's Film Service
- Release date: 22 December 1963
- Running time: 61 minutes
- Country: United Kingdom
- Language: English

Echo of Diana is a 1963 British second feature ('B') film directed by Ernest Morris and starring Vincent Ball, Betty McDowall and Geoffrey Toone. It was written by Reginald Hearne and produced by John I. Phillips for Butcher's Film Service.

A widow and two reporters accidentally uncover an international spy ring.

== Plot ==
Joan Scott's husband Philip is killed in an air crash in Eastern Europe. She discovers a mysterious "in memoriam" notice has been placed in a newspaper and signed by someone called "Diana". When Joan enlists the help of reporters Pam Jennings and Bill Vernon, their flats are raided, and they find themselves involved in an espionage adventure.

== Cast ==
- Vincent Ball as Bill Vernon
- Betty McDowall as Joan Scott
- Geoffrey Toone as Colonel Justin
- Clare Owen as Pam Jennings
- Raymond Adamson as George
- Peter Illing as Kovali
- Marianne Stone as Miss Green
- Michael Balfour as newsagent
- Tom Gill as photographer
- Richard Caldicot as Fisher, solicitor
- Leon Cortez as caretaker
- Colin Rix as police sergeant
- Joy Stewart as woman caller
- Anthony Baird as barman
- Patsi Karr as Kovali's secretary
- Denis Holmes as security officer
- Basil Beale as Harris
- Mark Petersen as young man
- Dermot Walsh as Phil Scott
- Arthur English as man in betting shop

== Reception ==
The Monthly Film Bulletin wrote: "An unassuming but swift spy thriller, which is sufficiently intriguing to make its unconvincing and melodramatic dénouement seem comparatively unimportant. It is quite adequately acted and presented."

The Radio Times Guide to Films gave the film 2/5 stars, writing: "In this low-budget spy drama, the newshound leads are two Australian actors, Vincent Ball and Betty McDowall, which makes a refreshing change from the usual fading Hollywood stars. Their noses for a story begin to twitch when a mysterious death puts them on the track of one of the most alfresco covert operations you are ever likely to clap eyes on. Director Ernest Morris does well to sustain it for an hour."

== Home media ==
It was released on DVD in 2011 by Renown Pictures as a double bill with Shadow of Fear (1963).
