= Three Spare Wives =

1962 British film by Ernest Morris

- Directed by: Ernest Morris
- Written by: Eldon Howard
- Based on: original play by Talbot Rothwell
- Produced by: Ralph Goddard
- Starring: Robin Hunter; Susan Stephen; John Hewer
- Cinematography: Walter J. Harvey
- Edited by: Peter Pitt
- Production company: Danziger Productions Ltd
- Distributed by: United Artists (UK)
- Release date: January 1962 (UK)
- Running time: 70 minutes
- Country: United Kingdom
- Language: English

Three Spare Wives is a 1962 British second feature ('B') comedy film directed by Ernest Morris and starring Susan Stephen, John Hewer, Robin Hunter. It was written by Eldon Howard based on a play by Talbot Rothwell.

== Plot ==
On the death of his Arabian uncle, George inherits three wives. Problems ensue with his existing wife Susan as well as with the British Foreign Office.

== Cast ==
- Susan Stephen as Susan
- John Hewer as Rupert
- Robin Hunter as George
- Barbara Leake as Mrs Hoensby
- Ferdy Mayne as Fazim Bey
- Gale Sheridan as O'Hara
- Dani Seper as Blini
- Golda Casimir as Fatima
- Tony Doonan as Beckwythe
- Doris Gilmore as Veronica
- Edward Palmer as Mr Probyn
- Norman Wynne as Jocko
- Raymond Rollett as British consul
- Noel Purcell as Sir Hubert
- Neil Wilson as Customs chief
- Garard Green as Customs officer

=== Critical reception ===
The Monthly Film Bulletin wrote: "Story and presentation are in the worst old-time tradition of theatrical films, for all the world like a left-over from the early Thirties. The acting is weak, and none of the cast seem at ease (understandably, in view of the material), with the exception of Ferdy Mayne who enjoys himself doing a pseudo-Sellers act as an Eshramese diplomat."

Chibnall and McFarlane wrote: "[Morris's] comedy, to use the term loosely, Three Spare Wives (1962), is excruciating."
