= Leon Cortez =

British musician (1898–1970)

Leon Cortez in the 1930s

Leon Cortez (27 May 1898 – 31 December 1970) was a British musician and actor who appeared regularly on stage and in films and television in a career that spanned five decades.

== Biography ==
Leon Cortez was born in London as Richard Alfred Chalklin, the son of Alice and Richard Ernest Chalklin, a house decorator. From August 1915 he served in the British Army and the Royal Air Force during World War I. After the War he married Hilda Adelaide Hunt in December 1918 and went into cinema management before turning to the stage. He became well known as a Cockney comedian and variety actor and he was regularly heard in his Cockney Coster Band (the act was top of the bill at the Adelphi in Slough in 1936 and appeared in the 1937 film Calling All Stars) and The 'Appy 'Alf 'Our on BBC Radio during the late 1930s and early 40s. Cortez also became known for his Shakespearean comedy parodies. In addition to his frequent film and television roles he continued to work on the stage for much of his life as well as being a regular in pantomime.

His television appearances included Dixon of Dock Green (1960–62); One Step Beyond (1961); Dice Player in Echo Four Two (1961); Lapie in Maigret (1961); Citizen James; Honest Arthur in Suspense (1963); First Driver / Court Usher in Bootsie and Snudge (1963); Innkeeper in Richard the Lionheart (1963); Mac / Birdie in The Saint (1964–68); Mr. Crogan in Beggar My Neighbour (1967); Samuels in Out of the Unknown (1969); Christofis in Christ Recrucified (1969); Noony in A Cuckoo in the Nest (1970) and Will in Play for Today (1970). His roles in the BBC comedy series Dad's Army include Henry the Milkman in Museum Piece (1968) and the Small Man in Man Hunt (1969).

His film roles include Townsman (uncredited) in Can't Help Singing (1944); Lou in Strip Tease Murder (1961); Grimes in Gang War (1962); Busker in I Could Go On Singing (1963); Caretaker in Echo of Diana (1963) and 'Uncle Marty' in Secrets of a Windmill Girl (1966);

Cortez was about to begin rehearsals for two other television plays when he suddenly died in Brighton in East Sussex on 31 December 1970 aged 72.
