= Michael Osborne (actor) =

British stage, film and television actor (born 1947)

- Born: 13 November 1947 (age 78); London, England, United Kingdom
- Occupation: Actor

Michael Osborne (born 13 November 1947 in London, England) is a British stage, film and television actor.

Roles include the future King George V in Edward the Seventh and Mr. Howard in Grange Hill.

== Selected TV and filmography ==
- Dad's Army (1968) - Boy Scout
- The Six Wives of Henry VIII (1970) - Mark Smeaton
- Dixon of Dock Green (1970–72) - PC Newton
- The Man with the Golden Gun (1974) - Naval Lieutenant
- Edward the Seventh (1975) - Prince George
- Force 10 from Navarone (1978) - Naval Lieutenant
- Lady Oscar (1979) - Bernard Chatelet, Rosalie's Lover
- Doctor Who: The Horns of Nimon (1979–80) - Sorak
- Grange Hill (1984) - Mr. Howard
- Sylvester (1985) - Irish Trainer
- In Sickness and in Health (1985) - Mr. Howard
