= Royal Variety Charity =

British charity supporting those who have served the entertainment industry

- Founded: 1908; 118 years ago
- Location(s): Twickenham, London; England, United Kingdom
- Region served: UK
- Key people: Giles Cooper (chairman)
- Website: royalvarietycharity.org
- Formerly called: Variety Artistes' Benevolent Fund; Entertainment Artistes' Benevolent Fund

The Royal Variety Charity is a British charity based in Twickenham, London, England. It is dedicated to giving support to those who have professionally served the entertainment industry and find themselves sick, impoverished or elderly.

The charity is believed to be one of the few charities in the UK that has an unbroken line of patronage from the reigning monarch since George V in the early twentieth century. King Charles III is the current sole life-patron of the charity.

Established in 1908, the charity was originally called the Variety Artistes' Benevolent Fund, and then in 1971 the Entertainment Artistes' Benevolent Fund, and before being officially permitted in June 2015 to use the title the Royal Variety Charity.

It provides residential and nursing care for elderly entertainers at its own care home, Brinsworth House in Twickenham and also provides a nationwide grant scheme for those living in their own homes, of any age, living anywhere in the UK.

== Royal Variety Performance ==
The Royal Variety Charity has organised its own annual fundraising event called the Royal Variety Performance since 1912, which is attended by the monarch or other senior members of the British royal family.
