= Captain Birdseye =

Advertising mascot character

Captain Iglo fish fingers box

Captain Birdseye, also known as Captain Iglo, is the advertising mascot for the Birds Eye frozen food brand founded by Clarence Birdseye (known as Iglo in parts of Europe). Appearing in numerous television and billboard commercials, he has been played or modelled by various actors and is generally depicted as a clean living, older sailor with a white beard, dressed in merchant naval uniform and a white polo neck sweater and with a West Country pirate-style accent.

== History ==
The mascot is a reference to the brand's range of frozen seafood products such as fish fingers. The actor most associated with Captain Birdseye was John Hewer, who played the character from 1967 to 1998. His tenure was interrupted by a hiatus in 1971, when the fictitious Captain was killed off by Birds Eye, with an "obituary" in The Times announcements section:

Birdseye, Captain. On June 7th, 1971, after long exposure, life just slipped through his fingers. Celebrity and gourmet. Mourned by Sea-Cook Jim and the Commodore, in recognition of his selfless devotion to the nutritional needs of the nation’s children.

Birdseye decided to resurrect the character three years later, on 22 July 1974, to bolster its brand against rising competition and rising prices resulting from the Cod Wars. Hewer returned to the role. In 1993, he was named in a poll as the most recognisable captain on the planet after Captain Cook.

In 1998, Captain Birdseye became a much younger, rugged, dark-haired man with designer stubble and a miniature submarine, played by Thomas Pescod. The older portrayal returned in 2002, played by Martyn Reid until 2007. From 2008 until his death in 2012 German taxi driver Gerd Deutschmann played the captain. From early 2016 to late 2016 the captain was played by Mitch Commins, followed by Denis Parlato from mid 2016 to early 2017. Mark Fletcher took over the role in 2017 until early 2018, when Italian-born actor and seafarer Riccardo Acerbi was cast.

In South Africa, Captain Birdseye was played by British actor Larry Taylor.

== Acquisitions ==
The brand was owned by Anglo-Dutch food conglomerate Unilever until 2006, when it was sold to a private equity firm, Permira.
