= Bill Le Sage =

British musician, composer and bandleader (1927–2001)

- Born: William A. Le Sage; 20 January 1927; London, England
- Died: 31 October 2001 (aged 74) Ealing, West London, England
- Genre: Jazz
- Occupations: Musician; Bandleader; Arranger; Composer
- Instruments: Vibraphone; Piano
- Years active: 1945–2001

William A. Le Sage (20 January 1927 – 31 October 2001) was a British pianist, vibraphonist, arranger, composer and bandleader.

== Early life ==
Le Sage was born in London on 20 January 1927. His father, William (1899-1951) was a drummer and his two uncles were both musicians (George - trumpet, saxophone and Ernie - guitar). He started playing the ukulele at the age of eight, and drums at fifteen. He was self-taught as a pianist.

== Later life and career ==
Le Sage's career began in 1945, after he had returned to London after being an evacuee in Sussex, when he led a sextet. He was then a member of army bands while serving with the Royal Signals. He played piano for the Johnny Dankworth Seven in March 1950, but soon switched to vibraphone. He left in 1954 to join the various small groups led by the drummer Tony Kinsey, with whom he stayed until 1961. He then joined baritone sax player Ronnie Ross, with whom he co-led various line-ups until 1966. During this period, Le Sage also played with Kenny Baker's Dozen. He began writing music for television and films.

During the 1960s, Le Sage was with Jack Parnell's ATV orchestra, the Chris Barber Band, and led his group, Directions in Jazz. His composer credits included scores for the films The Tell-Tale Heart (1960), Tarnished Heroes (1961), The Silent Invasion (1961), Two Wives One Wedding (1961), Strip Tease Murder (1963) and The Court Martial of Major Keller (1964).

He accompanied visiting American musicians, including guitarist Tal Farlow, with whom he struck up a close musical partnership, on an annual basis. In 1969, he formed the Bebop Preservation Society quintet, which he continued for more than two decades. Le Sage also worked with Barbara Thompson's Jubiaba and others. During the 1990s, he occasionally played with pianist Tony Lee's group on vibraphone.

He died in London on 31 October 2001.

== Discography ==
=== As leader/co-leader ===
- Bill's Recipes (1959)
- Light Comedy (1961)
- Presenting The Bill Le Sage – Ronnie Ross Quartet (1963
- Directions in Jazz (1964)
- Road to Ellingtonia (1965)
- Vier Celli + Jazz (1965)
- Twice Times Keyboard (1966, with Ronnie Ross)
- Vibraphone Jazz Quartet (1971, with Tony Kinsey)
- Wavendon - Jazz At The Stables (1980, with Ronnie Scott Quartet)
- Confirmation (2001)
- The Right Vibes (2001)
- The Right Vibes: Final Volume (2002, with Phil Lee (guitar) and Alec Dankworth (bass)
- Live at the Bull – Tribute Vols. 1–2 (2007)
- Soho Scene '64 (2016, but recorded in 1964, various artists)
- New Directions in Jazz (2022, with Ronnie Ross)
- The Mesmirist (unknown)

=== As sideman ===
- British Jazz (1956, with Johnny Keating and All Stars)
- English Jazz (1956, with Johnny Keating and All Stars)
- Play a 'Jazz at the Flamingo' Session (1957, with The Tony Kinsey Quartet
- It Swings (1958, with Sid Phillips)
- Red Bird Jazz & Poetry (1959, with Christopher Logue and Tony Kinsey)
- An Evening with Tony Kinsey 'Mr. Percussion' (1961, with The Tony Kinsey Quintet)
- Cy and I (1965, with Cy Grant)
- Hi Hawaii (1967, with Wout Steenhuis)
- Guitars for Girl Friday (1967, with Wout Steenhuis)
- Cleopatra's Needle (1968, with Ronnie Ross)
- Harold McNair (1968, with The Harold McNair Quartet)
- Islands in the Sun (1968, with Cy Grant, Papette & the Islanders Steelband, and Ken Kirkham and the Islanders)
- The Be-Bop Preservation Society (1971, with The Be-Bop Preservation Society)
- Live at Fulham Town Hall (1986, with The Charlie Watts Orchestra)
- Psychomania (Original Soundtrack Music) (unknown, with John Cameron)
