= Caroline Dowdeswell =

English actress (born 1945)

- Born: 7 March 1945 (age 81); Oldham, Lancashire, England
- Occupation: Actress
- Years active: 1959–1978
- Spouse: Wytham Greer (m. 1977)

Caroline Dowdeswell (born 7 March 1945) is a former English television actress.

== Career ==
She attended theatre school from age 12 and joined the Bromley Rep at 17. Dowdeswell first appeared on television in 1961, and her first role was in The Villains in 1964. Her television career includes appearances in Crossroads; Softly, Softly; Z-Cars; Ours Is A Nice House; the first series of Dad's Army in the recurring role of Janet King; On the Buses; Casanova and Man About The House. She also played Sandra in the films On the Buses and Mutiny on the Buses. She retired from acting in 1978 and now works in the publishing industry.

== Acting Credits ==
- 1964: The Villains - The Blonde - 1 episode
- 1966: You Can't Win - Cynthia Atkinson - 1 episode
- 1966: North and South - Edith Shaw - 2 episodes
- 1966: Meet the Wife - Saleslady - 1 episode
- 1966: Vendetta - WPC69 - 1 episode
- 1967: United! - Millicent Henbro - 1 episode
- 1967: ITV Play of the Week - Mollie - 1 episode
- 1967: Softly, Softly - June - 2 episodes
- 1968: Z-Cars - Mary Carson - 2 episodes
- 1968: Champion House - Miss. Barber - 1 episode
- 1968: The War of Darkie Pilbeam - Jeanette Perrott
- 1968: Dad's Army - Janet King - 5 episodes
- 1969: Hadleigh - Maggie - 1 episode
- 1969-70: Ours Is a Nice House - Vera Parker - 13 episodes
- 1970: Husband and Lovers - Christina - 1 episode
- 1970: The Mating Machine - Girlfriend - 1 episode
- 1970-76: Crossroads - Anne Taylor/Powell - Recurring
- 1971: On the Buses - Sandra
- 1971: Casanova - Anna - 4 episodes
- 1972: Mutiny on the Buses - Sandra
- 1973: General Hospital - Evie Marsh - 1 episode
- 1973: Billy Liar - Gloria Honeybell
- 1973: Murder Must Advertise - Miss Parton
- 1974: They Disappear When You Lie Down - Linda
- 1974: Man About the House - Angie - 1 episode
- 1975: Comedy Playhouse - Lisa - 1 episode
- 1975: My Honourable Mrs - Susan - 3 episodes
- 1977: Miss Jones and Son - 1 episode
