= 1960 in British television =

This is a list of British television related events from 1960.

== Events ==
=== January ===
- 1 January – Sir Hugh Greene becomes Director-General of the BBC.
- January – ATV's variety show Sunday Night at the London Palladium, compered by Bruce Forsyth, features Cliff Richard and The Shadows, and is watched by more than twenty million people.
- 31 January – Southern Television's broadcast area expands when it begins broadcasting to Kent and East Sussex. The Independent Television Authority has granted Southern the right to broadcast to South East England.

=== March ===
- 26 March – The Grand National is televised for the first time, by the BBC Television Service.
- 29 March – The 5th Eurovision Song Contest is held at the Royal Festival Hall in London and broadcast by the BBC. France wins the contest with the song "Tom Pillibi", performed by Jacqueline Boyer. The United Kingdom is placed second for a second successive year with "Looking High, High, High" sung by Bryan Johnson (brother and brother-in-law of last year's entrants).

=== April ===
- 24 April – Harold Pinter's drama A Night Out is screened in ABC Weekend TV's Armchair Theatre series a month after its premiere on radio. It is Pinter's first big success as a playwright in television, being viewed by 6.4 million households, at this time a record for a single television play. The cast includes Tom Bell, Pinter (credited as David Baron) and Vivien Merchant, and the producer is Sydney Newman.

=== June ===
- 1 June – ITV and the BBC both show the Epsom Derby, because it is a protected event which cannot be exclusive to either channel. However, the rest of the Epsom events, including The Oaks, are broadcast exclusively on ITV.
- 2 June – About Anglia launches as a twice-weekly programme accompanying the ten-minute regional evening news bulletin in East Anglia on weekdays. Its success prompts it to be extended to four nights a week the following September and then to every weeknight.
- 20 June – Nan Winton becomes the first national female newsreader on the BBC Television Service.
- 29 June – The BBC Television Centre is opened in West London.

=== July ===
- 13 July – The Pilkington Committee on Broadcasting is established to consider the future of broadcasting, cable and "the possibility of television for public showing". Their report, published in 1962, criticises the populism of ITV and recommends that Britain's third national television channel (after the BBC Television Service and ITV) should be awarded to the BBC. As a result, BBC Two will be launched in April 1964.

=== September ===
- 10 September – ITV broadcasts the first live Football League match to be shown on television and the last for 23 years. The commentators are Peter Lloyd and Billy Wright.
- 11 September – Danger Man premieres on ITV, starring Patrick McGoohan as Secret Agent John Drake.
- 19 September – BBC Schools starts using the Pie Chart ident.

=== October ===
- 8 October – The BBC Television Service is renamed as BBC TV.

=== November ===
- 6 November – John Osborne's A Subject of Scandal and Concern, starring Richard Burton, is broadcast in the BBC Sunday-Night Play strand.
- 28 November – One hour of the final of the amateur All-England Pairs Championship in snooker is shown live on Midland ITV.

=== December ===
- 9 December – The first episode of soap opera Coronation Street, made by Granada Television in Manchester, is aired live on ITV. Intended as a thirteen-week pilot, it eventually continues past its 10,000th episode in its 60th anniversary year as Britain's longest-running television soap. Characters introduced in the first episode include Ken Barlow (William Roache, who will continue in the role for more than sixty years), Elsie Tanner (Pat Phoenix) and Ena Sharples (Violet Carson).
- December – The first ‘translator’ station opens, covering Hastings. This is the first station to broadcast an existing station on another channel, to provide new or better coverage in an area covered by a larger transmitter. This, and subsequent translator stations, are unattended with only occasional visits for maintenance.

== Debuts ==
=== BBC Television Service/BBC TV ===
- 1 January
  - The Trouble with Harry (1960)
  - How Green Was My Valley (1960)
- 3 January
  - BBC Sunday-Night Play (1960–1963)
  - The Secret Garden (1960)
- 21 January – A Life of Bliss (1960–1961)
- 29 January – Sykes and A... (1960–1965)
- 16 February – Soldier, Soldier (1960)
- 26 February – Emma (1960)
- 28 February – The Splendid Spur (1960)
- 1 March – Siwan (1960)
- 4 April – Don't Do It Dempsey (1960)
- 12 April
  - The Pen of My Aunt (1960)
  - Scotland Yard (1960)
- 24 April – The Long Way Home (1960)
- 28 April – An Age of Kings (1960)
- 6 May – The Secret Kingdom (1960)
- 16 May – A Matter of Degree (1960)
- 17 May – Yorky (1960–1961)
- 8 June – The Days of Vengeance (1960)
- 12 June – St. Ives (1960)
- 1 July – The Herries Chronicle (1960)
- 3 July – Tales of the Riverbank (1960; 1963; 1972)
- 24 July – The Adventures of Tom Sawyer (1960)
- 27 July – Golden Girl (1960–1961)
- 8 August – Here Lies Miss Sabry (1960)
- 19 August – The Small House at Allington (1960)
- 16 September – It's a Square World (1960–1964)
- 18 September – Sheep's Clothing (1960)
- 19 September – No Wreath for the General (1960)
- 22 September – Meet the Champ (1960)
- 30 September – Barnaby Rudge (1960)
- 1 October? – Bonehead (1960–1962)
- 11 October – Here's Harry (1960–1965)
- 16 October – Paul of Tarsus (1960)
- 31 October – Maigret (1960–1963)
- 15 November – The World of Tim Frazer (1960–1961)
- 24 November – Citizen James (1960–1962)
- 25 November – The Charlie Drake Show (1960–1961)
- 26 December – Brian Rix Presents (1960–1971)
- 30 December – Persuasion (1960)

=== ITV ===
- 17 January – Counter-Attack (1960)
- 30 January – Man from Interpol (1960)
- 3 February – Somerset Maugham Hour (1960–1963)
- 6 March – Formula for Danger (1960)
- 25 February – Four Feather Falls (1960)
- 28 February
  - Inside Story (1960)
  - Suspense (1960)
- 1 March – Francis Storm Investigates (1960)
- 1 April
  - Biggles (1960)
  - The Roving Reasons (1960)
- 20 April – The Love of Mike (1960)
- 24 April – Target Luna (1960)
- 4 May – Young at Heart (1960)
- 8 May – Bonanza (1959–1973)
- 22 May – Royal Variety Performance (1960–present)
- 5 June – Armchair Mystery Theatre (1960–1965)
- 13 June – Deadline Midnight (1960–1961)
- 28 June – Mess Mates (1960–1962)
- 8 July – On Trial (1960)
- 10 September
  - Candid Camera (1960–1967)
  - Police Surgeon (1960)
  - Theatre 70 (1960–1961)
- 11 September
  - Danger Man (1960–1961, 1964–1968)
  - Our House (1960–1962)
  - Pathfinders in Space (1960)
  - Whiplash (1960–1961)
- 23 September – Bootsie and Snudge (1960–1963, 1974)
- 19 October – The Odd Man (1960–1963)
- 22 October – The Strange World of Gurney Slade (1960)
- 1 November – The Old Pull 'n Push (1960–1961)
- 14 November – The Dickie Henderson Show (1960–1968)
- 23 November – The Citadel (1960–1961)
- 9 December – Coronation Street (1960–present)
- 10 December – The Cheaters (1960–1962)
- 11 December – Pathfinders to Mars (1960–1961)
- Unknown – All Our Yesterdays (1960–1973, 1987–1989)

== Continuing television shows ==
=== 1920s ===
- BBC Wimbledon (1927–1939, 1946–2019, 2021–2024)

=== 1930s ===
- Trooping the Colour (1937–1939, 1946–2019, 2023–present)
- The Boat Race (1938–1939, 1946–2019, 2021–present)
- BBC Cricket (1939, 1946–1999, 2020–2024)

=== 1950s ===
- Andy Pandy (1950–1970, 2002–2005)
- Come Dancing (1950–1998)
- What's My Line? (1951–1963; 1973–1974; 1984–1990)
- All Your Own (1952–1961)
- Watch with Mother (1952–1975)
- Billy Bunter of Greyfriars School (1952–1961)
- Rag, Tag and Bobtail (1953–1965)
- The Good Old Days (1953–1983)
- Panorama (1953–present)
- Asian Club (1953–1961)
- Sportsview (1954–1968)
- Zoo Quest (1954–1963)
- Carols from King's (1954—present)
- Picture Book (1955–1965)
- Sunday Night at the London Palladium (1955–1967, 1973–1974)
- Take Your Pick! (1955–1968, 1992–1998)
- Double Your Money (1955–1968)
- Dixon of Dock Green (1955–1976)
- Crackerjack (1955–1970, 1972–1984, 2020–2021)
- The Brains Trust (1955–1961)
- The Gardening Club (1955–1967)
- This Is Your Life (1955–1964; 1969–2003)
- The Sooty Show (1955–1992)
- Benny Hill Show (1955–1961; 1964; 1966–1968)
- ITV Play of the Week (1955–1974)
- Gunsmoke (1955–1975)
- Hancock's Half Hour (1956–1961)
- Opportunity Knocks (1956–1978, 1987–1990)
- This Week (1956–1978, 1986–1992)
- Armchair Theatre (1956–1974)
- What the Papers Say (1956–2008)
- Zoo Time (1956–1968)
- Spot the Tune (1956–1962)
- Cool for Cats (1956–1961)
- Boyd Q.C. (1956–1964)
- Alfred Marks Time (1956–1961)
- Eurovision Song Contest (1956–present)
- The Billy Cotton Band Show (1956–1968)
- ITV Wimbledon (1956–1968)
- Picture Parade (1956–1962)
- Alfred Hitchcock Presents (1955–1965)
- The Army Game (1957–1961)
- The Sky at Night (1957–present)
- Mark Saber (1957–1962)
- Criss Cross Quiz (1957–1967)
- Jim's Inn (1957–1963)
- Emergency Ward 10 (1957–1967)
- The Arthur Haynes Show (1957–1966)
- Pinky and Perky (1957–1968; 1968–1972)
- Captain Pugwash (1957–1966; 1974–1975)
- The Kilt Is My Delight (1957–1963)
- Lenny the Lion Show (1957–1961)
- Tonight (1957–1965)
- On Safari (1957–1965)
- Blue Peter (1958–present)
- Grandstand (1958–2007)
- Saturday Playhouse (1958–1961)
- Your Life in Their Hands (1958–1964; 1979–1987; 1991)
- Monitor (1958–1965)
- The White Heather Club (1958–1968)
- Railway Roundabout (1958–1962)
- The Black and White Minstrel Show (1958–1978)
- Gwlad y Gan (1958–1964)
- Sword of Freedom (1958–1961)
- Face to Face (1959–1962)
- Noggin the Nog (1959–1965, 1970, 1979–1982)
- Torchy the Battery Boy (1959–1961)
- The Third Man (1959–1965)
- Garry Halliday (1959–1962)
- Juke Box Jury (1959–1967)
- The Ken Dodd Show (1959–1969)
- The Men from Room 13 (1959–1961)
- Wicker's World (1959–1994)
- Probation Officer (1959–1962)
- No Hiding Place (1959–1967)
- Knight Errant Limited (1959–1961)
- Rawhide (1959–1965)
- Tales from Dickens (1959–1961)
- International Detective (1959–1961)
- Maverick (1957–1962)
- 77 Sunset Strip (1958–1964)

== Ending this year ==
- The Adventures of Robin Hood (1955–1960)
- Life With The Lyons (1955–1960)
- Campion (1959–1960)
- Foo Foo (1959–1960)
- Whack-O! (1956–1960; 1971–1972)
- The Frontiers of Space (1956–1960; 1968–1969)
- The Larkins (1958–1960; 1963–1964)
- Ditto (1958–1960)
- Children’s Caravan (1956–1960)
- Hotel Imperial (1958–1960)
- Charlie Drake (1958–1960)
- Glencannon (1959–1960)
- The Voodoo Factor (1959–1960)
- Tell It to the Marines (1959–1960)
- The Four Just Men (1959–1960)
- Interpol Calling (1959–1960)
- Skyport (1959–1960)
- Para Handy - Master Mariner (1959–1960)
- Chelsea at Nine (1957–1960)

== Births ==
- 4 January – Julia St. John, actress
- 6 January – Nigella Lawson, television cookery presenter and writer
- 6 February – Jeremy Bowen, Welsh journalist and television presenter
- 18 February – Carol McGiffin, broadcaster
- 19 February – Leslie Ash, actress
- 22 February – Paul Abbott, television writer
- March – Dan Patterson, comedy producer
- 10 March – Anne MacKenzie, Scottish current affairs presenter
- 16 March – Jenny Eclair, comedian and novelist
- 11 April – Jeremy Clarkson, motoring journalist and television show host
- 13 April – Lindsey Coulson, actress
- 22 April – Gary Rhodes, restaurateur and celebrity chef (died 2019)
- 25 April – Robert Peston, journalist and BBC business editor
- 5 May – Gillian Wright, actress
- 6 May – Roma Downey, Northern Irish actress and producer
- 25 May – Anthea Turner, television presenter and media personality
- 2 June – Shaun Wallace, "The Dark Destroyer", quizzer (The Chase) and barrister
- 4 June – Bradley Walsh, English comedian, game show presenter and actor
- 11 July – Caroline Quentin, actress
- 13 July – Ian Hislop, broadcaster and editor
- 27 July – Gabrielle Glaister, actress (Brookside)
- 9 September – Hugh Grant, actor
- 10 September – Colin Firth, actor
- 12 September – Felicity Montagu, actress (I'm Alan Partridge)
- 17 September – Annabelle Apsion, actress
- 11 October – Nicola Bryant, actress
- 29 October – Finola Hughes, actress
- 15 November – Dawn Airey, media executive
- 17 November – Jonathan Ross, English television presenter
- 23 November – Darren Jordon, journalist and news presenter
- 30 November – Gary Lineker, English footballer and television presenter
- 17 December – Kay Burley, news presenter
- 24 December – Carol Vorderman, television presenter
- 27 December – Maryam d'Abo, actress

== Deaths ==
- 16 November – Gilbert Harding, broadcasting personality (born 1907) (asthma attack outside Broadcasting House)

== See also ==
- 1960 in British music
- 1960 in British radio
- 1960 in the United Kingdom
- List of British films of 1960
