= List of British films of 1960 =

This is a list of films produced in the United Kingdom in 1960 (see 1960 in film):

== 1960 ==
Title	Director	Cast	Genre	Notes
1960
And the Same to You	George Pollock	Brian Rix, William Hartnell	Comedy	
The Angry Silence	Guy Green	Richard Attenborough	Drama	BAFTA winner, entered into Berlin
Beat Girl	Edmond T. Gréville	David Farrar, Noëlle Adam, Christopher Lee	Drama	
Bluebeard's Ten Honeymoons	W. Lee Wilder	George Sanders, Corinne Calvet	Thriller	
Bottoms Up	Mario Zampi	Jimmy Edwards, Arthur Howard	Comedy	
The Boy Who Stole a Million	Charles Crichton	Harold Kasket, George Coulouris	Comedy	
The Brides of Dracula	Terence Fisher	Peter Cushing, Martita Hunt	Horror	
The Bulldog Breed	Robert Asher	Norman Wisdom, Ian Hunter	Comedy	
Carry On Constable	Gerald Thomas	Sid James, Kenneth Williams	Comedy	
The Challenge	John Gilling	Jayne Mansfield, Anthony Quayle	Crime	
Circle of Deception	Jack Lee	Bradford Dillman, Suzy Parker	War	
Circus of Horrors	Sidney Hayers	Anton Diffring, Erika Remberg	Horror	
The City of the Dead	John Llewellyn Moxey	Venetia Stevenson, Christopher Lee	Horror	
Cone of Silence	Charles Frend	Bernard Lee, Michael Craig, Peter Cushing	Drama	
Conspiracy of Hearts	Ralph Thomas	Lilli Palmer, Sylvia Syms	Drama	
The Criminal	Joseph Losey	Stanley Baker, Sam Wanamaker, Jill Bennett	Crime/drama	
Crossroads to Crime	Gerry Anderson	Anthony Oliver, Ferdy Mayne	Crime/thriller	
The Day They Robbed the Bank of England	John Guillermin	Aldo Ray, Elizabeth Sellars	Crime	
Dead Lucky	Montgomery Tully	Vincent Ball, Betty McDowall	Crime	
Dentist in the Chair	Don Chaffey	Bob Monkhouse, Ronnie Stevens	Comedy	
Depth Charge	Jeremy Summers	Alex McCrindle, David Orr	Drama	
Doctor in Love	Ralph Thomas	Michael Craig, James Robertson Justice	Comedy	
The Entertainer	Tony Richardson	Laurence Olivier, Roger Livesey, Joan Plowright, Alan Bates	Drama	John Osborne's adaption of his play
Escort for Hire	Godfrey Grayson	June Thorburn, Pete Murray	Crime	
Faces in the Dark	David Eady	John Gregson, Mai Zetterling, John Ireland	Crime drama	
Feet of Clay	Frank Marshall	Vincent Ball, Wendy Williams	Crime	
The Flesh and the Fiends	John Gilling	Peter Cushing, Donald Pleasence	Horror	
Follow That Horse!	Alan Bromly	David Tomlinson, Cecil Parker	Comedy	
Foxhole in Cairo	John Llewellyn Moxey	James Robertson Justice, Adrian Hoven	War	
A French Mistress	Roy Boulting	Cecil Parker, James Robertson Justice	Comedy	
The Full Treatment	Val Guest	Claude Dauphin, Diane Cilento	Drama	Based on the novel published in 1959
The Gentle Trap	Charles Saunders	John Dunbar, Spencer Teakle	Crime	
The Hand	Henry Cass	Derek Bond, Reed De Rouen	Horror	
Hand in Hand	Philip Leacock	Kathleen Byron, Finlay Currie	Family	
The Hands of Orlac	Edmond T. Gréville	Mel Ferrer, Christopher Lee	Thriller	
Hell Is a City	Val Guest	Stanley Baker, Donald Pleasence, Billie Whitelaw	Crime drama	
His and Hers	Brian Desmond Hurst	Terry-Thomas, Janette Scott	Comedy	
The House in Marsh Road	Montgomery Tully	Tony Wright, Patricia Dainton	Thriller	
Identity Unknown	Frank Marshall	Richard Wyler, Pauline Yates	Drama	
In the Nick	Ken Hughes	Anthony Newley, Anne Aubrey	Comedy	
Inn for Trouble	C.M. Pennington-Richards	Peggy Mount, Leslie Phillips	Comedy	Spin-off from The Larkins
Jackpot	Montgomery Tully	William Hartnell, Betty McDowall	Crime	
Jazz Boat	Ken Hughes	Anthony Newley, Anne Aubrey	Musical/comedy	
Kidnapped	Robert Stevenson	Peter Finch, James MacArthur, Bernard Lee	Adventure	
The League of Gentlemen	Basil Dearden	Jack Hawkins, Nigel Patrick	Crime	
Let's Get Married	Peter Graham Scott	Anthony Newley, Anne Aubrey	Comedy/drama	
Life Is a Circus	Val Guest	Bud Flanagan, Teddy Knox	Comedy	
Light Up the Sky!	Lewis Gilbert	Ian Carmichael, Benny Hill	Comedy	
Linda	Don Sharp	Carol White, Alan Rothwell	Teen Drama	
Make Mine Mink	Robert Asher	Terry-Thomas, Athene Seyler, Hattie Jacques	Comedy	
Man in the Moon	Basil Dearden	Kenneth More, Shirley Anne Field	Comedy	
The Man Who Couldn't Walk	Henry Cass	Eric Pohlmann, Peter Reynolds	Drama	
The Man Who Was Nobody	Montgomery Tully	Hazel Court, John Crawford	Thriller	
The Millionairess	Anthony Asquith	Sophia Loren, Peter Sellers	Comedy	
Mission in Morocco	Carlos Arévalo	Lex Barker, Juli Reding, Fernando Rey	Crime	Co-production with Spain
Never Let Go	John Guillermin	Peter Sellers, Richard Todd, Elizabeth Sellars	Crime drama	
Never Take Sweets from a Stranger	Cyril Frankel	Patrick Allen, Gwen Watford, Felix Aylmer	Drama	
Night Train for Inverness	Ernest Morris	Norman Wooland, Jane Hylton, Dennis Waterman	Drama	
No Kidding	Gerald Thomas	Leslie Phillips, Geraldine McEwan	Comedy	
Once More, with Feeling!	Stanley Donen	Yul Brynner, Kay Kendall	Comedy	
Operation Cupid	Charles Saunders	Charles Farrell, Avice Landone	Comedy	
Oscar Wilde	Gregory Ratoff	Robert Morley, Ralph Richardson, John Neville	Biopic	
Peeping Tom	Michael Powell	Carl Boehm, Anna Massey	Thriller	Number 78 in the list of BFI Top 100 British films
Piccadilly Third Stop	Wolf Rilla	Terence Morgan, Yoko Tani	Thriller	
The Pure Hell of St Trinian's	Frank Launder	Cecil Parker, Joyce Grenfell, George Cole, Thorley Walters	Comedy	
The Running Jumping & Standing Still Film	Richard Lester	Peter Sellers, Spike Milligan	Comedy	Short film
Sands of the Desert	John Paddy Carstairs	Charlie Drake, Peter Arne	Comedy	
Saturday Night and Sunday Morning	Karel Reisz	Albert Finney, Shirley Anne Field, Rachel Roberts	Drama	Number 14 in the list of BFI Top 100 British films
The Savage Innocents	Nicholas Ray	Anthony Quinn, Peter O'Toole	Drama	
School for Scoundrels	Robert Hamer	Ian Carmichael, Terry-Thomas	Comedy	
Sink the Bismarck!	Lewis Gilbert	Kenneth More, Carl Möhner, Dana Wynter	World War II drama	
Sons and Lovers	Jack Cardiff	Trevor Howard, Dean Stockwell	Drama	
The Spider's Web	Godfrey Grayson	Glynis Johns, John Justin	Mystery	
The Stranglers of Bombay	Terence Fisher	Guy Rolfe, Jan Holden	Action	
The Sundowners	Fred Zinnemann	Deborah Kerr, Robert Mitchum, Peter Ustinov	Drama	
Surprise Package	Stanley Donen	Yul Brynner, Mitzi Gaynor	Comedy	
Suspect	John Boulting, Roy Boulting	Tony Britton, Virginia Maskell	Thriller	
Sword of Sherwood Forest	Terence Fisher	Richard Greene, Sarah Branch, Peter Cushing	Adventure	
Tarzan the Magnificent	Robert Day	Gordon Scott, Jock Mahoney	Adventure	
The Tell-Tale Heart	Ernest Morris	Laurence Payne, Adrienne Corri	Horror	
A Terrible Beauty	Tay Garnett	Robert Mitchum, Richard Harris	War	
There Was a Crooked Man	Stuart Burge	Norman Wisdom, Alfred Marks	Comedy	
Too Hot to Handle	Terence Young	Jayne Mansfield, Leo Genn	Thriller	
Too Young to Love	Muriel Box	Pauline Hahn, Joan Miller	Drama	
Transatlantic	Ernest Morris	Pete Murray, June Thorburn	Crime	
The Trials of Oscar Wilde	Irving Allen	Peter Finch, Lionel Jeffries, John Fraser	Biopic	Entered into the 2nd Moscow International Film Festival
Trouble with Eve	Francis Searle	Hy Hazell, Robert Urquhart	Crime	
Tunes of Glory	Ronald Neame	Alec Guinness, John Mills, Dennis Price	Drama	
The Two Faces of Dr. Jekyll	Terence Fisher	Paul Massie, Dawn Addams	Horror	
Two-Way Stretch	Robert Day	Peter Sellers, Wilfrid Hyde-White, Lionel Jeffries	Comedy	
Urge to Kill	Vernon Sewell	Patrick Barr, Ruth Dunning	Crime	
Village of the Damned	Wolf Rilla	George Sanders, Barbara Shelley, Michael Gwynn	Horror, Sci-fi	
Watch Your Stern	Gerald Thomas	Kenneth Connor, Eric Barker	Comedy	
The World of Suzie Wong	Richard Quine	William Holden, Nancy Kwan	Romance	
The Young Jacobites	John Reeve	Francesca Annis, Jeremy Bulloch	Adventure	

== See also ==
- 1960 in British music
- 1960 in British radio
- 1960 in British television
- 1960 in the United Kingdom
