= 1960 in British music =

This is a summary of 1960 in music in the United Kingdom, including the official charts from that year.

== Events ==
- 29 March – The 5th Eurovision Song Contest, held at the Royal Festival Hall, London, is won by France with the song "Tom Pillibi", sung by Jacqueline Boyer. The UK is placed second for a second successive year with "Looking High, High, High" sung by Bryan Johnson (brother and brother-in-law of last year's UK entrants).
- 15 March – Jussi Björling suffers a heart attack before a performance at the Royal Opera House, Covent Garden. He goes on to perform, but dies six months later in Sweden.
- April – Jack Good's new TV show, Wham!, is broadcast for the first time.
- 12 April – Sir Thomas Beecham returns to the UK from his last overseas conducting tour; he dies the following year.
- 17 April – Eddie Cochran, Gene Vincent and Cochran's girlfriend Sharon Sheeley are injured in a car accident near Chippenham, Wiltshire. Cochran dies in a hospital in Bath, Somerset, from severe brain injuries.
- 20–28 May – The Beatles, as the Silver Beetles (uncredited), play their first ever tour, as a backing group for Johnny Gentle on a tour of Scotland. The lineup comprises John Lennon, Paul McCartney, George Harrison, Stuart Sutcliffe and Tommy Moore.
- June – Tommy Steele marries former Windmill girl Ann Donoghue at St. Patrick's Church, Soho Square, London.
- 30 June – Opening of Lionel Bart's musical Oliver! at the New Theatre in London's West End. It is an immediate success which makes stars of Ron Moody and Georgia Brown.
- July – The Shadows' instrumental Apache is released.
- 30 July – "Battle of Beaulieu": At a jazz festival at Beaulieu, Hampshire, fans of trad jazz come to blows with progressives.
- 1 August – The Beatles make their first appearance under this name in Hamburg, Germany. The band at this time comprises John Lennon, Paul McCartney, George Harrison, Stu Sutcliffe on bass and Pete Best on drums.
- August – Colin Davis makes his conducting début at the Proms in a programme of Britten, Schumann, Mozart and Berlioz.
- 21 September – Mstislav Rostropovich gives the UK premiere of Dmitri Shostakovich's First Cello Concerto at the Royal Festival Hall, London. Benjamin Britten attends, and from their meeting they become firm friends, resulting in Britten composing several major works for the cellist.
- December
  - Adam Faith becomes the first pop star to be interviewed on the BBC's Face to Face.
  - George Formby makes his final television appearance, on BBC's The Friday Show.
- Ian Lake launches the Music of our Time Festival in London for hitherto unknown composers.

== The Official UK Singles Chart ==
- See also List of UK top 10 singles in 1960

=== Number one singles ===
- See UK No.1 Hits of 1960

== Albums ==
- 101 Strings – Down Drury Lane to Memory Lane
- Adam Faith – Adam
- Billy Fury – The Sound of Fury
- Mantovani – The Music of Victor Herbert and Sigmund Romberg
- Anthony Newley – Love is a Now and Then Thing
- Cliff Richard and The Shadows – Me and My Shadows
- George Shearing – The Shearing Touch
- David Whitfield – My Heart and I
- Marty Wilde – Versatile Mr Wilde

== Classical music: new works ==
- William Alwyn – Piano Concerto No. 2
- Malcolm Arnold – Symphony No. 4
- Alun Hoddinott – Piano Concerto No. 2
- Michael Tippett – Music (words P.B. Shelley)
- William Walton – Symphony No. 2
- David Wynne – Ebb and Flow

== Opera ==
- Benjamin Britten – A Midsummer Night's Dream
- Arwel Hughes – Serch yw’r Doctor

== Film and Incidental music ==
- John Addison – The Entertainer (film version).
- Malcolm Arnold – The Pure Hell of St Trinian's.
- John Dankworth – Saturday Night and Sunday Morning, starring Albert Finney.
- Brian Easdale – Peeping Tom directed by Michael Powell.
- Ron Goodwin –
  - The Trials of Oscar Wilde, starring Peter Finch and Lionel Jeffries.
  - Village of the Damned, starring George Sanders.
- Elisabeth Lutyens – Never Take Sweets from a Stranger.
- Malcolm Williamson – The Brides of Dracula directed by Terence Fisher, starring Peter Cushing.

== Musical theatre ==
- Lionel Bart – Oliver!
- Julian Slade & Dorothy Reynolds – Follow That Girl

== Musical films ==
- Jazz Boat, starring Anthony Newley

== Births ==
- 31 January – George Benjamin, composer
- 3 February – Malcolm Martineau, pianist
- 4 February – Tim Booth, singer, dancer and actor (James)
- 11 February – Momus, born Nicholas Currie, songwriter
- 11 March – Martin Butler, composer
- 14 February – Jocelyn Pook, composer and viola player
- 19 February – Holly Johnson, singer (Frankie Goes to Hollywood)
- 4 April – Jane Eaglen, dramatic soprano
- 23 April
  - Steve Clark, rock guitarist (died 1991)
  - Barry Douglas, classical pianist
- 26 April – Roger Taylor, drummer (Duran Duran)
- 29 April – Phil King, bassist
- 19 May – Yazz, born Yasmin Evans, pop singer
- 24 May – Guy Fletcher, keyboardist (Dire Straits)
- 1 June – Simon Gallup, bassist (The Cure)
- 2 June – Tony Hadley, singer (Spandau Ballet)
- 8 June – Mick Hucknall, singer and songwriter (Simply Red)
- 10 June – Mark-Anthony Turnage, composer
- 19 June – Luke Morley, guitarist, songwriter and producer (The Union, Terraplane and Thunder)
- 20 June – John Taylor, bass guitarist (Duran Duran)
- 3 July – Vince Clarke, songwriter (Depeche Mode, Yazoo and Erasure)
- 19 July – Kevin Haskins, English-American drummer and songwriter (Bauhaus, Love and Rockets and Tones on Tail)
- 24 July – Pete Stollery, composer of electroacoustic music
- 14 August – Sarah Brightman, soprano singer and actress
- 8 September – David Steele, bassist (Fine Young Cannibals)
- 1 October – Peter Seabourne, composer
- 2 October – Django Bates, composer, multi-instrumentalist and band leader
- 3 October – Julian Grant, composer of opera, chamber music and music for children
- 5 October – Paul Heard, keyboardist (M People)
- 6 October – Richard Jobson, rock singer-songwriter (Skids), filmmaker and television presenter
- 18 November – Kim Wilde, singer
- 2 December – Rick Savage, bassist (Def Leppard)
- 22 December – Mark Brydon, guitarist, songwriter and producer

== Deaths ==
- 2 January – Leila Megane, operatic mezzo-soprano, 68
- 25 January – Rutland Boughton, composer, 82
- 27 March – Ian Whyte, conductor, 58
- 6 May – Eleanor Rudall, composer and pianist, 79
- 7 May – Mai Jones, songwriter, 61
- 12 May – Cecil Armstrong Gibbs, composer, 70
- 26 August – Mark Hambourg, pianist, 81
- 20 October – Denise Orme, music hall singer, 75
- 24 December – Beryl Ingham, clog-dancer and actress, wife and manager of George Formby, 59 (leukaemia)

== See also ==
- 1960 in British radio
- 1960 in British television
- 1960 in the United Kingdom
- List of British films of 1960
