= 1960 in British radio =

This is a list of events from British radio in 1960.

== Events ==
- 1 March – Harold Pinter's play A Night Out has its premiere on the BBC Third Programme with a cast including Barry Foster, Pinter and Vivien Merchant.
- 13 July – The Pilkington Committee on Broadcasting is established to consider the future of broadcasting.
- 2 August – Colin Davis makes his conducting début at the BBC Proms, with the London Symphony Orchestra in a programme of Rossini, Britten, Mozart, Berlioz and Schumann.

== Programme debuts ==
- January – Easy Beat on the BBC Light Programme (1960–1967)
- 20 September – Farming Today on BBC Network Three (1960–Present)

== Continuing radio programmes ==
=== 1940s ===
- Music While You Work (1940–1967)
- Sunday Half Hour (1940–2018)
- Desert Island Discs (1942–Present)
- Family Favourites (1945–1980)
- Down Your Way (1946–1992)
- Have A Go (1946–1967)
- Housewives' Choice (1946–1967)
- Letter from America (1946–2004)
- Woman's Hour (1946–Present)
- Twenty Questions (1947–1976)
- Any Questions? (1948–Present)
- Mrs Dale's Diary (1948–1969)
- Billy Cotton Band Show (1949–1968)
- A Book at Bedtime (1949–Present)
- Ray's a Laugh (1949–1961)

=== 1950s ===
- The Archers (1950–Present)
- Listen with Mother (1950–1982)
- From Our Own Correspondent (1955–Present)
- Pick of the Pops (1955–Present)
- The Clitheroe Kid (1957–1972)
- My Word! (1957–1988)
- Test Match Special (1957–Present)
- The Today Programme (1957–Present)
- The Navy Lark (1959–1977)
- Sing Something Simple (1959–2001)
- Your Hundred Best Tunes (1959–2007)

== Ending this year ==
- 28 January – The Goon Show (1951–1960)
- February – Educating Archie (1950–1960)
- 3 March – Take It from Here (1948–1960)
- 17 September – In Town Tonight (1933–1960)

== Births ==
- February – Lesley Riddoch, Scottish political journalist and broadcaster
- 6 February – Harry Thompson, comedy producer (died 2005)
- 10 March – Anne MacKenzie, Scottish broadcast journalist
- 10 April – Katrina Leskanich, singer and musician, presenter on BBC Radio 2 (1998–2000)
- 8 May – Terry Christian, broadcast presenter
- 13 May – Sheila McClennon, presenter
- 16 May – Bill Dare (Jones), comedy producer (died 2025)
- 2 June – Matthew Biggs, garden designer and gardening broadcaster (died 2026)
- 29 June – Charles Nove, presenter
- 30 July – Pete Tong, disc jockey
- 25 August – Dotun Adebayo, Nigerian-born broadcaster, writer and publisher
- 12 September – Felicity Montagu, comedy actress
- 2 October – Kevin Eldon, actor
- 17 November – Jonathan Ross, broadcast presenter
- Graham Torrington, disc jockey

== Deaths ==
- 7 May – Mai Jones, Welsh songwriter and radio producer (born 1899)
- 16 November – Gilbert Harding, broadcast personality (born 1907) (asthma attack outside Broadcasting House)

== See also ==
- 1960 in British music
- 1960 in British television
- 1960 in the United Kingdom
- List of British films of 1960
