= Slapstick and Old Lace =

1971 British TV sketch show

- Genre: Comedy
- Starring: Charlie Drake; Anna Dawson; Henry McGee
- Country of origin: United Kingdom
- Original language: English
- No. of series: 1
- No. of episodes: 7

Production
- Running time: 30 minutes
- Production company: ATV

Original release
- Network: ITV
- Release: 4 March – 15 April 1971

Slapstick and Old Lace is a British television sketch show which originally aired on ITV in 1971. Starring Charlie Drake, it was his follow-up to his hit television comedy The Worker which had lasted from 1965 to 1970. Also appearing in the show were Anna Dawson and Henry McGee. The title is a reference to the play Arsenic and Old Lace.

In 1976, Drake appeared in a stage show of the same name, which failed due to the extraordinary hot summer during which audience numbers dramatically fell.

== Bibliography ==
- Lawrence Goldman. Oxford Dictionary of National Biography 2005–2008. OUP Oxford, 2013.
- Howard Maxford. Hammer Complete: The Films, the Personnel, the Company. McFarland, 2018.
