= Behind the Headlines =

Behind the Headlines may refer to:

- Behind the Headlines (1937 film), an American film
- Behind the Headlines (1953 film), a British film directed by Maclean Rogers
- Behind the Headlines (1956 film), a British film directed by Charles Saunders
- Behind the Headlines with Mark Hyman, an editorial series by commentator Mark Hyman
