= Who Is Sylvia? (TV series) =

1967 British TV comedy series

- Genre: Sitcom
- Written by: Donald Churchill; Charlie Drake
- Directed by: Shaun O'Riordan
- Starring: Charlie Drake; Kathleen Byron
- Country of origin: United Kingdom
- Original language: English
- No. of series: 1
- No. of episodes: 7

Production
- Producer: Alan Tarrant
- Running time: 30 minutes
- Production company: ATV

Original release
- Network: ITV
- Release: 11 February – 25 March 1967

Who Is Sylvia? is a 1967 British television sitcom which aired on ITV. It stars Charlie Drake as a man in search of a wife who enlists the help of a marriage bureau run by Mrs. Proudpiece (Kathleen Byron) with predictably disastrous results.

Actors who appeared in episodes of the series include Leslie Dwyer, Ballard Berkeley, Victor Maddern, Pauline Collins, Sally Bazely, Austin Trevor, Justine Lord, Martin Benson, Shirley Stelfox, Henry McGee, George Woodbridge, Petra Markham, Michael Balfour and Wally Patch.

Five of the seven episodes made survive. The two episodes which are lost are episodes 5 and 6.

== Cast ==
- Charlie Drake as Charles Rameses Drake
- Kathleen Byron as Mrs. Proudpiece

== Bibliography ==
- Howard Maxford. Hammer Complete: The Films, the Personnel, the Company. McFarland, 2018.
