= Cracksman =

Cracksman is a term for a burglar. It may refer to:

- Cracksman (horse) (foaled 2014), a British Thoroughbred racehorse
- The Cracksman, a 1963 British comedy film directed by Peter Graham Scott
