= Bruce Forsyth's Big Night =

British television programme

Bruce Forsyth's Big Night is a television show screened on ITV on Saturday nights in late 1978. It starred Bruce Forsyth. Twelve episodes were broadcast between 7 October and 31 December 1978, with guests including Elton John, Lena Zavaroni, Dolly Parton and Karen Carpenter. Two further one-off specials were shown on 4 April and 21 September 1980, where Forsyth got the chance to perform an hour long show with idol and long-time friend Sammy Davis Jr, who had been a guest on an earlier show, in which Forsyth later said was the best show he had ever been associated with.

The show was made by London Weekend Television. Following the success enjoyed by The Generation Game, Forsyth was poached from the BBC for a reported £15,000 a show (equivalent to £81,975 in 2025) with each show having a budget of £250,000 (equivalent to £1,366,245 in 2025). The idea was that the show would provide Forsyth with a vehicle for his many and various talents. The show was designed to take up an entire Saturday evening on ITV and win the ratings battle with the BBC. However, it was poorly received and was broadly unsuccessful, with Forsyth's former big hit The Generation Game (then hosted by Larry Grayson) winning higher audiences. The first episode topped the television ratings, but episode two did not feature in the top twenty, leading to several attempts to revamp the format. Eventually, the show was cut to just 90 minutes in length, including advertisement breaks, and moved to a much earlier Saturday-night slot, but still ratings did not improve. Forsyth claimed in many subsequent on-screen interviews that the retooling did result in an increase in ratings, but this was not borne out by contemporary data. The format was later rebooted as two one-off specials in 1980.

The show featured some mini-games, like "Beat The Goalie" (a phone-in game with similarities to The Golden Shot) and little games with the studio audience. It also featured mini-comedies, such as a revival of 1960s series The Worker, with Charlie Drake as The Worker and Henry McGee (one of Benny Hill's stooges) as the man at the labour exchange, and also The Glums, a TV adaptation of short sketches from the radio series Take It From Here, with Jimmy Edwards reprising his role he immortalised on radio as Mr Glum, Ian Lavender (Private Pike from Dad's Army) playing the role of Ron (played by Dick Bentley in the radio series) and Patricia Brake as Eth, the role played on radio by June Whitfield. Recognising that a lot of the programme's content was very popular, ITV continued many of the items in a different format as separate programmes instead of being part of a running show. Both The Worker and The Glums were made into a full standalone series. The show also featured Cannon and Ball doing their own sketches, but the producer decided to axe their part from the show every single week, as they believed more Forsyth was the answer to the show's problems. Cannon and Ball were also given their own series. Each show also featured a game of The £1,000 Pyramid, hosted by Steve Jones, which was the first UK adaption of the American game show Pyramid. This show later also became a standalone programme on ITV, with Jones remaining as host. Forsyth himself continued on ITV by hosting the successful gameshow Play Your Cards Right.

One of the regular features on the show was Forsyth (and sometimes his wife Anthea Redfern) taking questions from the audience. This was usually humorous but not so much on week ten. Forsyth was asked about the press comments made about the show. He gave a long reply criticising the press for several lies they had written about the show. This included saying it was being taken off the air, which was totally false. He also revealed how one paper had been planning to write a story saying he had throat cancer, again false. Forsyth said that although he had friends in the press, the only part of a newspaper that can be totally believed is the date that they publish.
