= Peter Lloyd =

Peter Lloyd may refer to:

- Peter Lloyd (mountaineer) (1907–2003), British climber and engineer
- Peter Lloyd (aviator) (1920–2022), Australian sporting aviator and administrator
- Peter Lloyd (commentator) (1920–1972), British television football commentator
- Peter Lloyd (gymnast) (born 1949), Australian Olympic gymnast
- Sir Peter Lloyd (politician) (born 1937), British Conservative Party politician, Member of Parliament, 1979–2001
- Peter Lloyd (illustrator) (1944–2009), British-born American illustrator
- Peter Lloyd (journalist) (born 1966), foreign correspondent for the Australian Broadcasting Corporation
- Peter Lloyd (tennis), Australian tennis player
- Peter Eryl Lloyd, British television producer
