= 1960 United Kingdom local elections =

Elections in the United Kingdom

The 1960 United Kingdom local elections took place in:

== England ==
- Leeds
- Liverpool
- Sheffield
- Manchester

== Scotland ==
- Aberdeen
- Dundee
- Edinburgh
- Glasgow

== See also ==
- 1960 in the United Kingdom
