= 1960 in the United Kingdom =

Events from the year 1960 in the United Kingdom.

== Incumbents ==
- Monarch – Elizabeth II
- Prime Minister – Harold Macmillan (Conservative)

== Events ==
- January – The state of emergency is lifted in Kenya: the Mau Mau Uprising is officially over.
- 1 January – East House mass shooting: 3 men are killed and 2 wounded in a mass shooting at a pub in Sheffield by a Somali national subsequently determined to be insane.
- 5 January – Closure of the Swansea and Mumbles Railway which opened to passengers in 1807 and by this date is operated by double-decker electric trams.
- 10 January – Harold Macmillan makes the "Wind of Change" speech for the first time, to little publicity, in Accra, Ghana.
- 28 January – The comic ballet La fille mal gardée, in a version newly choreographed by Frederick Ashton to a score adapted by John Lanchbery, is premiered by The Royal Ballet at the Royal Opera House in London, rapidly becoming a classic of the repertoire.
- 3 February – Harold Macmillan makes the "Wind of Change" speech to the South African Parliament in Cape Town where it attracts attention. (It was drafted by David Hunt.) At home, it leads to formation of the Conservative Monday Club.
- 18–28 February – Great Britain and Northern Ireland compete at the Winter Olympics in Squaw Valley, California but do not win any medals.
- 19 February – The Queen gives birth to her third child and second son, the first child born to a reigning British monarch since 1857.
- March
  - Manchester City F.C. sign 20-year-old forward Denis Law for a national record fee of £55,000 from Huddersfield Town.
  - The 18th century Royal Navy dockyard at Sheerness on the Isle of Sheppey in Kent is closed. A total of 2,500 jobs have gradually been shed at the site since its closure was first announced by the government in February 1958.
- 14 March – Jodrell Bank Observatory makes contact with the American Pioneer 5 over a record-breaking distance of 407,000 miles.
- 20 March – Lonnie Donegan's single "My Old Man's a Dustman" reaches No. 1 in the UK charts.
- 26 March – The Grand National is televised for the first time. The winner is Merryman II.
- 28 March – Cheapside Street Whisky Bond Fire in Glasgow. 19 firemen are killed in the UK's worst peacetime fire services disaster.
- 1 April – Bill Griggs of Northampton first markets the Dr. Martens 'AirWair' style 1460 boots.
- 8 April – The seven-week-old son of the Queen and the Duke of Edinburgh is christened Andrew Albert Christian Edward; he later becomes Prince Andrew, Duke of York, and Andrew Mountbatten-Windsor.
- 13 April – The cancellation of the Blue Streak missile as a military project.
- 16 April – The Times of London abandons use of the term "Imperial and Foreign News", replacing it with "Overseas News" and changes its house style from "to-day" to "today".
- 17 April – American rock and roll singer Eddie Cochran, 21, is killed in a car crash in Wiltshire. Gene Vincent survives the accident.
- 18 April – 60,000 protestors stage a demonstration in London against nuclear weapons.
- 27 April – The first production of Harold Pinter's play The Caretaker takes place at the Arts Theatre in London.
- 30 April – Yorkshire County Cricket Club opens its first season since 1883 under a professional captain, Vic Wilson, who leads the club to the County Championship.
- 3 May – Burnley F.C. win the Football League First Division title with a 2–1 win over Manchester City at Maine Road. Burnley's title win means that Wolverhampton Wanderers, the FA Cup finalists, have lost out on the chance of becoming the first team this century to win the double of the league title and FA Cup.
- 6 May – Princess Margaret marries photographer Antony Armstrong-Jones at Westminster Abbey in the first televised Royal marriage ceremony.
- 7 May – Wolverhampton Wanderers are the FA Cup winners for the fourth time, beating Blackburn Rovers 3–0 at Wembley Stadium.
- 18 June – Jaguar Cars completes its purchase of the Daimler Company from BSA. Daimler Cars will later become rebadged Jaguars.
- 22 June – A fire in a Liverpool department store kills eleven.
- 24 June – Avro 748 makes its first flight from Woodford.
- 26 June – British Somaliland gains independence from the United Kingdom. Five days later, it unites with the former Italian Somaliland to create the modern Somali Republic.
- 28 June – 38 miners are killed in an explosion at Six Bells Colliery in Monmouthshire.
- 30 June
  - The musical Oliver! by Lionel Bart has its West End premiere.
  - The English Electric Lightning enters service as the Royal Air Force's first operational supersonic fighter aircraft with No. 74 Squadron at RAF Coltishall.
- July – The Shadows' instrumental "Apache" is released.
- 21 July – Francis Chichester, English navigator and yachtsman, arrives in New York aboard Gypsy Moth III, having made a record solo Atlantic crossing in 40 days, winning the first Single-Handed Trans-Atlantic Race.
- 27 July – In a Cabinet reshuffle, Selwyn Lloyd is appointed Chancellor of the Exchequer and Lord Home becomes Foreign Secretary.
- 30 July – "Battle of Beaulieu": At a jazz festival at Beaulieu, Hampshire, fans of trad jazz come to blows with progressives.
- 7 August – The Bluebell Railway in Sussex begins regular operations as the first standard gauge steam-operated passenger heritage railway in the world.
- 16 August – Cyprus gains its independence from the United Kingdom. The Sovereign Base Areas of Akrotiri and Dhekelia remain as British Overseas Territories.
- 17 August – The Beatles, a five-strong male band from Liverpool, perform their first concert under this name in Hamburg, West Germany.
- 22 August – First performance of satirical revue Beyond the Fringe, in Edinburgh.
- 25 August–11 September – Great Britain and Northern Ireland compete at the Olympics in Rome and win 2 gold, 6 silver and 12 bronze medals.
- September
  - Formal conclusion of agreement for the supply from the United States of Skybolt nuclear missiles (later abandoned) to equip Vulcan bombers in exchange for permitting establishment of a U.S. Navy base on Holy Loch in Scotland for Polaris-equipped nuclear ballistic missile submarines.
  - First Ten Tors expedition on Dartmoor.
- 10 September – ITV broadcasts the first live Football League match to be shown on television and the last for 23 years.
- 15 September – First traffic wardens deployed in London.
- 30 September–4 December – Severe flooding occurs in the valley of the River Exe, surrounding areas of Devon, and elsewhere in southern England, following heavy rainfall.
- 1 October – Nigeria gains its independence from the United Kingdom.
- 7 October – The second notable flood occurs in Horncastle, Lincolnshire. The town enters the UK Weather Records with the highest 180-min total rainfall at 178 mm. As of October 2020, this record remains.
- 8 October
  - Closure of the original Sheffield Tramway, leaving Blackpool as the only place in England with electric trams.
  - In the final of the Rugby League World Cup, staged in the UK, Great Britain beats Australia 10–3.
- 17 October – The News Chronicle ceases publication, being absorbed into the Daily Mail.
- 21 October (Trafalgar Day) – The Queen launches Britain's first nuclear submarine, HMS Dreadnought, at Barrow-in-Furness.

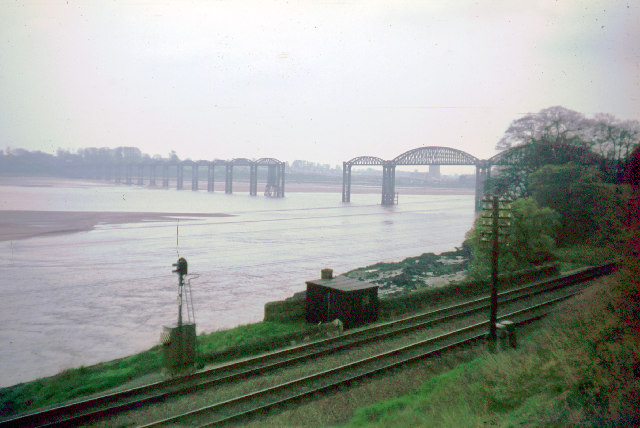
Damage to the Severn Railway Bridge

- 25 October – Barges collide with one of the columns of the Severn Railway Bridge in heavy fog, causing two spans of the twenty-two span steel and cast iron bridge to collapse. It is never repaired.
- 27 October – The film Saturday Night and Sunday Morning is released, the first of the British social-realist wave.
- 30 October – Michael Woodruff performs the first successful kidney transplant in the UK at the Edinburgh Royal Infirmary.
- 1 November – Black plastic bin bags (manufactured by ICI) are first introduced for waste collection, in Hitchin.
- 2 November – Penguin Books is found not guilty of obscenity in R v Penguin Books Ltd, the Lady Chatterley's Lover case.
- 10 November – Lady Chatterley's Lover sells 200,000 copies in one day following its publication since being banned since 1928.
- 2 December
  - The Archbishop of Canterbury, Geoffrey Fisher, talks with Pope John XXIII in the Vatican, the first ever meeting between the leader of the Anglican Church and the Pope.
  - The marriage of theatrical couple Vivien Leigh and Laurence Olivier ends.
- 9 December – The first episode of the soap opera Coronation Street, made by Granada Television in Manchester, is aired on ITV. It will still be running past its 10,000th episode in its 60th anniversary year. Characters introduced in the first episode include Ken Barlow (William Roache), Ena Sharples (Violet Carson), Elsie Tanner (Pat Phoenix) and Annie Walker (Doris Speed).
- 10 December – Sir Peter Brian Medawar and Australian Sir Frank Macfarlane Burnet win the Nobel Prize in Physiology or Medicine "for discovery of acquired immunological tolerance".
- 31 December
  - The last day on which the farthing, a coin first minted in England in the 13th century, is legal tender.
  - The last man is called up for National Service, as Conscription ends.
- Undated – Little Houses Improvement Scheme launched by the National Trust for Scotland to promote conservation of vernacular architecture.

== Publications ==
- Jean and Gareth Adamson's first Topsy and Tim children's book.
- Kingsley Amis's novel Take a Girl Like You.
- Lynne Reid Banks' novel The L-Shaped Room.
- Stan Barstow's novel A Kind of Loving.
- Lawrence Durrell's novel Clea, last of The Alexandria Quartet.
- Ian Fleming's James Bond short story collection For Your Eyes Only.
- Alan Garner's children's novel The Weirdstone of Brisingamen.
- Audrey Harvey's March Fabian Society pamphlet Casualties of the Welfare State.
- David Lodge's first novel The Picturegoers.
- Muriel Spark's novel The Ballad of Peckham Rye.
- David Storey's first novel This Sporting Life.
- Raymond Williams' novel Border Country.
- John Wyndham's novel Trouble with Lichen.

== Births ==
=== January – February ===
- 1 January – Danny Wilson, footballer and manager
- 4 January – Jane Halton, English-Australian public servant
- 6 January – Nigella Lawson, British chef and writer
- 10 January – John Mann, English lawyer and politician
- 13 January – Matthew Bourne, English choreographer
- 18 January – Mark Rylance, English actor and theatre director
- 23 January
  - Paul Blagg, English racewalker
  - Paul Mason, English journalist
- 29 January – Sean Kerly, British field hockey player
- 31 January – George Benjamin, composer and conductor
- 4 February – Siobhan Dowd, British writer and activist (died 2007)
- 6 February
  - Jeremy Bowen, journalist and television presenter
  - Harry Thompson, British comedy writer (died 2005)
- 10 February – Robert Addie, actor (died 2003)
- 19 February
  - Andrew Mountbatten-Windsor, third child of Elizabeth II
  - Helen Fielding, English novelist
- 20 February – Siobhain McDonagh, British Labour politician and MP for Mitcham and Morden
- 21 February – Jane Tomlinson, athlete and cancer activist (died 2007)
- 22 February – Paul Abbott, television screenwriter and producer
- 27 February – Paul Humphreys, musician and songwriter (OMD)

=== March – April ===
- 1 March – Benedict Allen, explorer
- 9 March – Louise Miller, high jumper
- 10 March – Anne MacKenzie, Scottish broadcast journalist
- 16 March
  - Jenny Eclair, born Jenny Clare Hargreaves, comedian
  - John Hemming, British Liberal Democrat politician and businessman
- 17 March – Patrick Vallance, scientist
- 23 March – Nicol Stephen, Scottish politician
- 24 March – Grayson Perry, visual artist
- 29 March – Marina Sirtis, actress
- 2 April – Linford Christie, Jamaican-born sprinter
- 4 April
  - Jonathan Agnew, cricket broadcaster and player
  - Jane Eaglen, soprano
- 7 April – Sandy Powell. costume designer
- 11 April – Jeremy Clarkson, motoring journalist and television show host
- 13 April – Lyn Carol Brown, Labour politician and MP for West Ham
- 22 April – Gary Rhodes, restaurateur and celebrity chef (died 2019)
- 26 April – Roger Taylor, new wave drummer (Duran Duran)
- 28 April – Ian Rankin, Scottish crime novelist
- 29 April – Phil King, rock bassist
- 30 April
  - Colonel Tim Collins, Northern Irish-born British Commander in Iraq
  - Geoffrey Cox, Conservative politician, Attorney General for England and Wales

=== May – June ===
- 2 May – Stephen Daldry, director
- 6 May – Roma Downey, Northern Irish actress and producer
- 8 May – Terry Christian, broadcaster
- 17 May – Simon Fuller, film and TV producer
- 23 May – Michel Albert Roux, chef
- 24 May
  - Guy Fletcher, rock keyboardist (Dire Straits)
  - Kristin Scott Thomas, film actress
- 28 May – Mary Portas, retail expert and broadcaster
- June – Angela Harding, printmaker and illustrator
- 2 June
  - Tony Hadley, pop singer
  - Shaun Wallace, television personality and barrister
- 4 June
  - Suzy Aitchison, English actress
  - Bradley Walsh, English comedian and actor
- 5 June
  - Claire Fox, writer and politician
  - Julie Kirkbride, Conservative politician and MP for Bromsgrove
- 8 June – Mick Hucknall, pop/soul singer-songwriter (Simply Red)
- 10 June – Mark-Anthony Turnage, composer
- 20 June – John Taylor, new wave bass guitarist (Duran Duran)
- 24 June – Elish Angiolini, senior Scottish law officer and academic administrator
- 27 June
  - David Cholmondeley, 7th Marquess of Cholmondeley, British peer and filmmaker
  - Jeremy Swift, English television actor
- 28 June – Richard Rycroft, actor and comedian
- 30 June – Jack McConnell, First Minister of Scotland

=== July – August ===
- 3 July – Vince Clarke, English songwriter (Depeche Mode, Yazoo and Erasure)
- 4 July – Mark Steel, comedian
- 11 July – Caroline Quentin, English television comedy actress
- 13 July – Ian Hislop, British editor and broadcaster
- 16 July – Jacqueline Gold, English businesswoman (died 2023)
- 18 July – Simon Heffer, English journalist
- 22 July – Barbara Cassani, American-born business executive
- 27 July – Emily Thornberry, English politician
- 13 August – Phil Taylor, darts player
- 14 August – Sarah Brightman, English soprano singer and actress
- 16 August – Ijeoma Uchegbu, scientist
- 30 August – Ben Bradshaw, English Labour politician, Minister for Local Environment, Marine and Animal Welfare, and MP for Exeter

=== September – October ===
- 3 September
  - Perry Bamonte, English musician (died 2025)
  - Nick Gibb, British Conservative politician, Shadow Minister of State for Schools, and MP for Bognor Regis and Littlehampton
- 6 September – Shirley Ballas, ballroom dancer and dance judge
- 9 September – Hugh Grant, English actor
- 10 September
  - Margaret Ferrier, Scottish National Party politician
  - Colin Firth, English actor
- 16 September – Danny John-Jules, English dancer and actor
- 17 September – Damon Hill, English racing driver
- 19 September – Shaun Greenhalgh, English art forger
- 24 September – Tony Juniper, English environmentalist and politician
- 29 September – Andy Slaughter, British Labour politician and MP for Ealing, Acton and Shepherd's Bush and Hammersmith
- 6 October – Richard Jobson, Scottish rock singer-songwriter, filmmaker and television presenter (Skids)
- 15 October – Simon Wigg, English speedway rider (died 2000)
- 16 October
  - Cressida Dick, English police officer
  - Graeme Sharp, Scottish football player and manager
- 17 October – Guy Henry, English actor
- 29 October – Finola Hughes, British actress

=== November – December ===
- 5 November – Tilda Swinton, British film actress
- 10 November – Neil Gaiman, English author
- 15 November – Dawn Airey, broadcaster
- 17 November – Jonathan Ross, English television presenter
- 18 November – Kim Wilde, English singer and gardener
- 20 November – Robert Dunlop, Northern Irish motorcycle racer (died 2008)
- 28 November – John Galliano, British fashion designer
- 30 November – Gary Lineker, English footballer and TV presenter
- 2 December – Rick Savage, English bassist (Def Leppard)
- 10 December – Kenneth Branagh, Northern Irish actor and director
- 11 December – John Lukic, English footballer
- 14 December – Chris Waddle, English footballer, commentator and newspaper columnist
- 17 December – Kay Burley, English broadcaster
- 24 December – Carol Vorderman, British television presenter
- 26 December – Andrew Graham-Dixon, British art historian and television presenter
- 27 December – Maryam d'Abo, British actress
- 28 December – Nicola Horlick, investment manager
- 31 December – Steve Bruce, footballer and football manager

=== Undated ===
- James A. Robinson, English-born economist
- Josette Simon, actress
- Harriet Wistrich, lawyer and feminist

== Deaths ==
- 3 January – Constance Spry, English florist (born 1886)
- 7 January – Dorothea Douglass Lambert Chambers, English tennis player (born 1878)
- 9 January – Elsie J. Oxenham, English children's novelist (born 1880)
- 11 January – Isabel Emslie Hutton, Scottish nurse in Serbia during World War I and psychiatrist (born 1887)
- 12 January – Nevil Shute, English novelist and aeronautical engineer (born 1899) (died in Australia)
- 25 January – Rutland Boughton, English composer (born 1878)
- 8 February
  - J. L. Austin, English philosopher of language (born 1911) (lung cancer)
  - Sir Giles Gilbert Scott, English architect (born 1880)
- 20 February – Sir Leonard Woolley, English archaeologist (born 1880)
- 29 February – Edwina Mountbatten, Countess Mountbatten of Burma, last Vicereine of India (born 1901)
- 5 April – Peter Llewelyn Davies, English publisher, soldier and inspiration for Peter Pan (born 1897) (suicide)
- 1 May
  - Harold Bradfield, Anglican prelate, Bishop of Bath and Wells (born 1898) (died in office)
  - Charles Holden, architect (born 1875)
- 8 May
  - Sir Hersch Lauterpacht, international lawyer (born 1897 in Ukraine)
  - J. H. C. Whitehead, mathematician (born 1904 in Madras) (heart attack at Princeton, NJ)
- 7 June – Sir Maurice Bonham Carter, English Liberal politician and cricketer (born 1880)
- 27 June
  - Lottie Dod, English sportswoman (born 1871)
  - Harry Pollitt, English communist (born 1890)
- 6 July – Aneurin Bevan, Welsh Labour politician (born 1897)
- 16 August – Pat O'Keeffe, middleweight boxer (born 1883)
- 24 August – Sir Harold Bowden, businessman and inventor (born 1880)
- 24 August – Sir Charles Lambe, admiral of the fleet, First Sea Lord (born 1900)
- 28 August – Charles Forbes, admiral (born 1880)
- 22 September
  - Melanie Klein, Austrian-born psychoanalyst (born 1882)
  - Amy Veness, English film actress (born 1876)
- 27 September – Sylvia Pankhurst, English suffragette (born 1882)
- 30 September – St John Philby, British Arabist, explorer and spy (born 1885 in Ceylon) (died in Beirut)
- 21 October – Katharine Stewart-Murray, Duchess of Atholl, "Red Duchess", Scottish politician and humanitarian (born 1874)
- 16 November – Gilbert Harding, radio and television personality (born 1907) (asthma attack outside Broadcasting House)
- 13 December – Dora Marsden, radical feminist and modernist literary editor (born 1882)
- 20 December – Sir Godfrey Ince, civil servant (born 1891)
- 22 December – Sir Ninian Comper, architect (born 1864)

== See also ==
- 1960 in British music
- 1960 in British television
- List of British films of 1960
- 1960 United Kingdom local elections
