= The Charlie Drake Show =

British TV comedy series (1958–1968)

- Genre: Sitcom; Sketch; Stand-up
- Written by: Charlie Drake; Richard Waring; Lew Schwarz
- Starring: Charlie Drake
- Country of origin: United Kingdom
- No. of episodes: 30

Production
- Running time: 60 minutes (1 episode); 45 minutes (10 episodes); 35 minutes (7 episodes); 30 minutes (12 episodes)

Original release
- Network: BBC TV (12 episodes); BBC1 (11 episodes); ITV (7 episodes)
- Release: 31 August 1958 – 28 April 1968

Related
- Charlie Drake

The Charlie Drake Show is the name of four British comedy programmes that aired from 1958 to 1968. Starring comedian Charlie Drake, two of the programmes aired on ITV and two on the BBC.

== 1958 programme ==
The first programme to use the title The Charlie Drake Show was a one-off 60 minute sketch and stand-up that aired on ITV on Sunday 31 August 1958 at 8.30pm. Made in black-and-white, the programme was produced by Kenneth Carter. The episode is presumed lost.

== 1960 sitcom ==
Two years later a sitcom, called The Charlie Drake Show, aired on BBC TV. The programme aired for a total of 12 episodes, each 30 minutes long, over three series from 25 November 1960 to 24 October 1961. It was written by Drake and Richard Waring and produced by Ronald Marsh. The first series, which aired on Fridays at 7.30pm, had the theme of "coping with the pressures of modern day life in 1960". The theme of series two - which broadcast on Thursdays at 7.30pm - was adventure and spoofed TV programmes and films.

The third series was due to consist of six episodes. However, during live transmission of the first episode a stunt involving Drake went wrong and he fractured his skull and remained unconscious for three days. In the stunt, Drake was to be pulled through a bookcase and then thrown out of a sugar-glass window, only to emerge from a door and belt out his catchphrase, "Hello, my darlings!" However, a team of carpenters, unaware that the bookcase was to be fragile, nailed it down and made it too solid for Drake to pass through clearly. When Drake was pulled through the bookcase, he was knocked unconscious. The two actors who were with Drake, unaware of his condition, then, with visible difficulty, threw him out of the window, where he hit his head upon a weight. The episode went off the air when the crew realised what had happened. The unmade second and third episodes of that series were due to be called "Of Mouse and Man" and "French with Tears". Due to the policies of the time, the entire first series is missing and presumed lost. The first, third and sixth episodes of the second series are also missing.

=== Series One ===
#	Episode Title	Original Broadcast Date
1	"The Take-Over Bid"	25 November 1960
2	"The Man Would Could Dream Winners"	2 December 1960
3	"The Siege of Cyril Street"	9 December 1960
4	"Love Locked Out"	16 December 1960
5	"A Christmas Carol"	23 December 1960

=== Series Two ===
#	Episode Title	Original Broadcast Date
1	"The World of Charlie Frazer"	23 March 1961
2	"Charlie the Kid"	30 March 1961
3	"The Man Who Blew Himself Up"	6 April 1961
4	"Jester Minute"	13 April 1961
5	"Nine Little White Men"	20 April 1961
6	"A Thousand and One Flights"	27 April 1961

=== Series Three ===
#	Episode Title	Original Broadcast Date
1	"Bingo Madness"	24 October 1961
2	"Of Mouse and Man"	31 October 1961 (Scheduled, but not broadcast)
3	"French with Tears"	7 November 1961 (Scheduled, but not broadcast)

== 1963 programme ==
A few months after his accident, Charlie Drake announced his retirement whilst accepting the TV Comedian of the Year award. Two years later, however, he returned with an ITV sketch show, again called The Charlie Drake Show. Written by Drake and Lew Schwarz and produced by Colin Clewes, the six episodes aired from 28 September to 2 November 1963. Each episode was 35 minutes in duration and broadcast on Saturdays, mostly at 8.25pm. The show was one of the most expensive comedies of its time and featured pre-filmed and edited sketches. Each episode featured other actors, including Olivia Hussey. All six episodes exist in the archives.

== 1967 programme ==
The fourth and final The Charlie Drake Show was, like its immediate predecessor, a sketch show. It aired every fortnight on Sundays at 8.15pm on BBC1 from 1967 to 1968. It was the only one of the four programmes to be made in colour. It was written by Drake and produced by Ernest Maxin. Drake's co-star was Henry McGee. Eleven episodes were broadcast and all bar the tenth episode were 45 minutes long. The tenth episode, titled "The World of Charlie Drake", was 35 minutes and was the BBC's entry into the 1968 Montreux Festival. The ten 45 minutes episodes no longer exist in the archives. Parts of "The World of Charlie Drake" exist, but the complete episode is also missing.

=== Episodes ===
Episode Number	Original Broadcast Date
1	10 December 1967
2	24 December 1967
3	7 January 1968
4	21 January 1968
5	4 February 1968
6	18 February 1968
7	3 March 1968
8	17 March 1968
9	31 March 1968
10	14 April 1968
11	28 April 1968
