= The Cracksman =

1963 British film by Peter Graham Scott

- Directed by: Peter Graham Scott
- Screenplay by: Lewis Schwarz; Charlie Drake
- Story by: Lewis Schwarz
- Produced by: W. A. Whittaker
- Starring: Charlie Drake; Nyree Dawn Porter; George Sanders; Dennis Price
- Cinematography: Harry Waxman
- Edited by: Richard Best
- Music by: Ron Goodwin
- Production company: Associated British Picture Corporation
- Distributed by: Warner-Pathé Distributors
- Release date: 30 July 1963
- Running time: 112 minutes
- Country: United Kingdom
- Language: English

The Cracksman is a 1963 British comedy film directed by Peter Graham Scott and starring Charlie Drake, Nyree Dawn Porter, George Sanders and Dennis Price. It was written by Lewis Schwarz and Drake.

== Plot ==
Honest but naive locksmith Ernest Wright believes that everybody is equally honest. First, he is duped by a debonair con man into opening a car. He is caught but given probation. Next, the same man fools him into breaking into a house, and again he is caught while the villain escapes. After release from jail he gets tricked into opening a safe, for which he receives a three-year jail sentence. On arrival in prison, he finds he has a reputation as a master thief. On release, he is manipulated by two gangs into a safe-cracking scheme but, with the help of undercover policewoman Muriel, he helps trap the crooks and clear his name.

Portions of the film satirise the films Birdman of Alcatraz (1962) and Dr. No (1962), Drake's 1961 hit song My Boomerang Won't Come Back, and the Ceremony of the Keys at the Tower of London.

== Cast ==
- Charlie Drake as Ernest Wright
- Nyree Dawn Porter as Muriel
- George Sanders as Guv'nor
- Dennis Price as Grantley
- Percy Herbert as Nosher Jenkins
- Eddie Byrne as Domino
- Finlay Currie as Feathers
- Geoffrey Keen as magistrate
- George A. Cooper as Fred
- Patrick Cargill as museum guide
- Norman Bird as policeman
- Neil McCarthy as Van Gogh
- Christopher Rhodes as Mr. King
- Ronnie Barker as Yossle
- Wanda Ventham as Sandra
- Jerold Wells as Chief Prison Officer
- Tutte Lemkow as choreographer
- Richard Leech as Detective Sergeant
- Richard Shaw as Moke

== Production ==
Wright's shop was filmed in Whitecross Street, London. The prison locations were HM Prison Wandsworth and HM Prison Aylesbury. The Tiki nightclub exterior was in Buckingham Street, London WC2.

Delia Derbyshire created the sound for the "In a Monastery Garden" sequence. The instrument is, in her words, "an E♭safe-unlocking mechanism."

== Reception ==
Variety said: "Drake, who decided that he was going to take it easy after injuring himself doing his own stunts, falls back into slapstick literally in this film. He is swept down a sewer, crashed through a door, bodily flung into the boot of a car and he endures several other physical indignities for the sake of laughs. Trouble is that most of the comedy situations are stretched too long. Some more astute cutting by editor Richard Best would have added a tang to the screenplay and Peter Graham Scott’s lively direction."

The New York Times called the film a "colorful slapstick comedy".

Leslie Halliwell said: "The most elaborate vehicle devised for this diminutive star; despite bright moments, conventional mounting and over-generous length finally defeat it."

The Radio Times Film Guide gave the film 2/5 stars, writing: "A muddle of slapstick and pathos, the film is ridiculously overlong and needlessly opulent."
