= Drake's Progress =

Television series

- Genre: Sketch comedy
- Written by: Charlie Drake; George Wadmore; Maurice Wiltshire; George Inns; Sid Green; Dick Hills
- Starring: Charlie Drake; Irene Handl; Warren Mitchell; Willoughby Goddard; Valentine Dyall
- Country of origin: United Kingdom
- No. of series: 2
- No. of episodes: 12

Production
- Producer: George Inns
- Running time: 30 minutes

Original release
- Network: BBC Television Service
- Release: 6 May 1957 – 5 May 1958

Related
- Charlie Drake

Drake's Progress was a British sketch show that aired on BBC Television from 1957 to 1958. It was co-written by comedian Charlie Drake, who was also the show's lead performer.

== Cast ==
- Charlie Drake
- Irene Handl (series 1)
- Warren Mitchell (series 1)
- Willoughby Goddard (series 1)
- Valentine Dyall (series 2)

== Episodes ==
Drake's Progress aired for two series and a total of twelve 30 minute episodes. Both the first and second series broadcast on Mondays at 8.00pm, with the series one airing fortnightly. None of the episodes exist in the BBC archives and are lost.

=== Series One ===
Episode Number	Original Broadcast Date
1	6 May 1957
2	20 May 1957
3	3 June 1957
4	17 June 1957
5	1 July 1957
6	15 July 1957

=== Series Two ===
Episode Number	Original Broadcast Date
1	31 March 1958
2	7 April 1958
3	14 April 1958
4	21 April 1958
5	28 April 1958
6	5 May 1958
