= Kathleen Byron =

English actress (1921–2009)

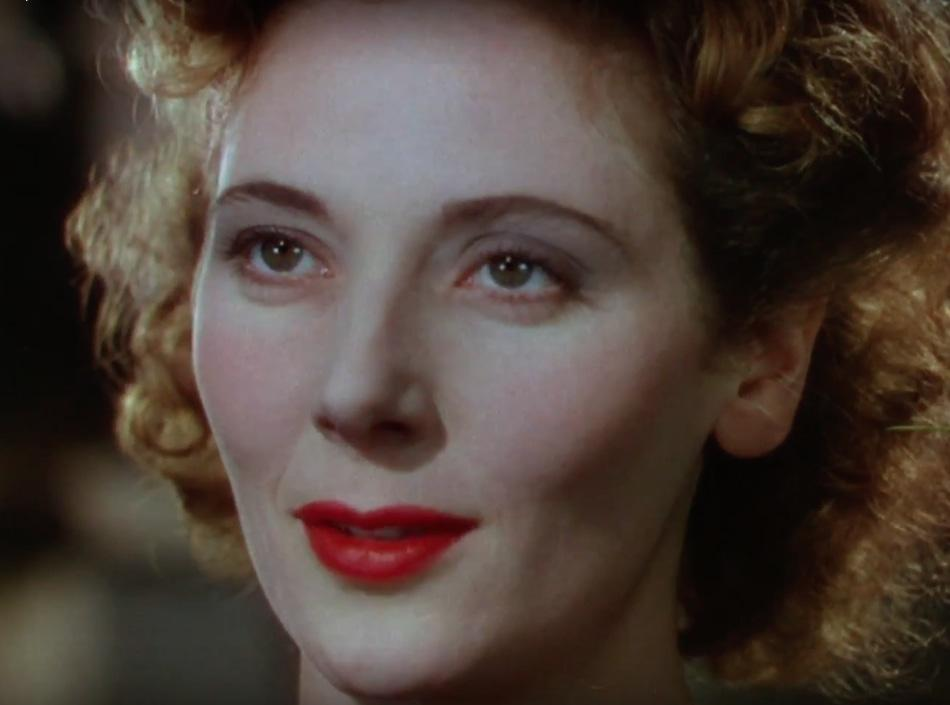
- Byron in Black Narcissus
- Born: Kathleen Elizabeth Fell; 11 January 1921; Manor Park, Essex, England
- Died: 18 January 2009 (aged 88); Northwood, London, England
- Other name: Kathleen Jacob
- Education: Bristol Old Vic Theatre School
- Occupation: Actress
- Years active: 1938–2001
- Spouses: Daniel Bowen (m. 1943; div. 1950) Alaric Jacob (m. 1953; died 1995)
- Children: 2 (+ 1 stepdaughter)

Kathleen Elizabeth Fell (11 January 1921 – 18 January 2009), known professionally as Kathleen Byron, was an English actress.

== Early life and education ==
Byron was born in Manor Park (then part of Essex) to what she described as "staunch working-class socialists," the daughter of a railway clerk who later became Labour Party mayor of the County Borough of East Ham. She attended the local grammar school and trained at the Bristol Old Vic Theatre School.

== Career ==
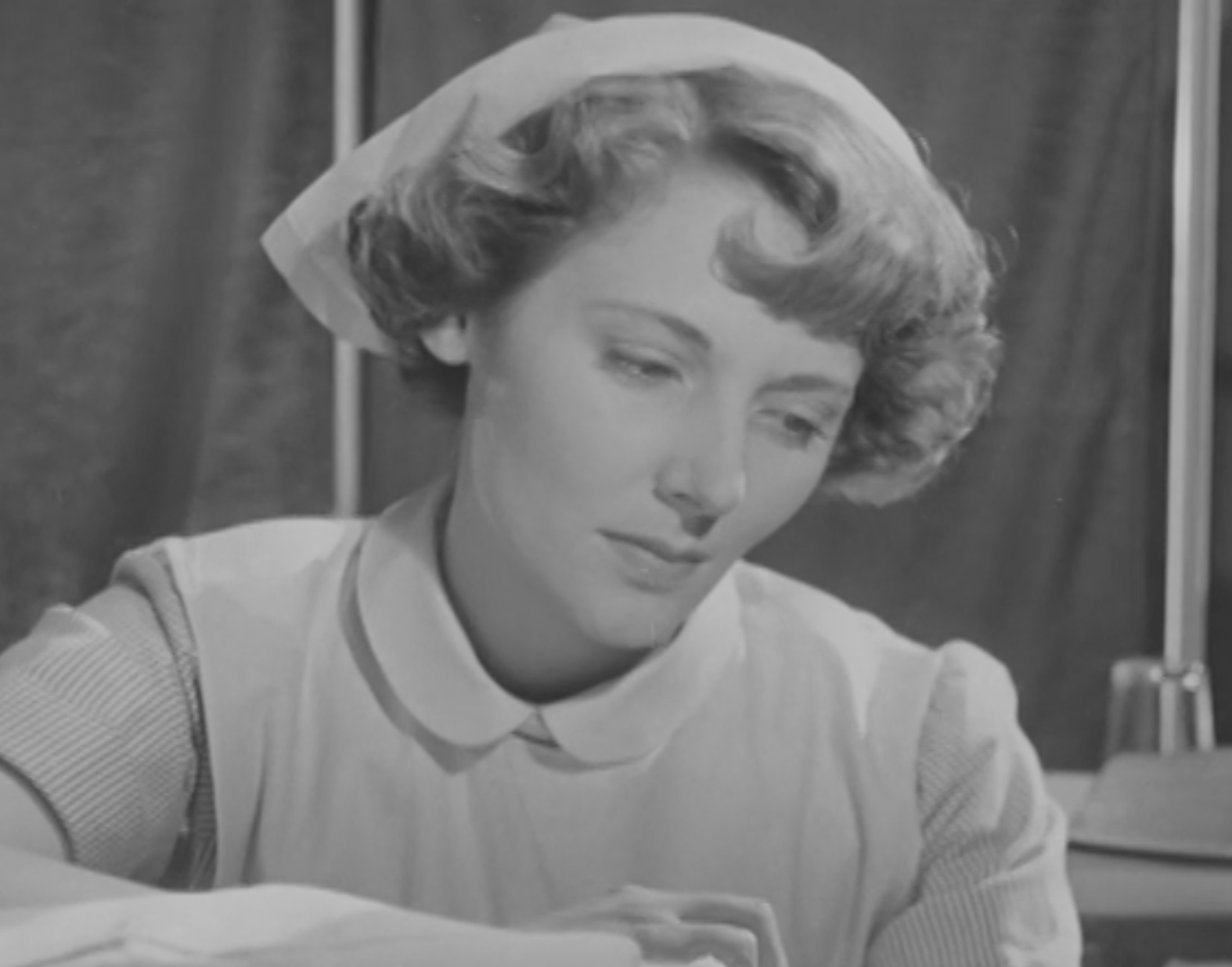
Kathleen Byron as Ann Peters in Life in Her Hands, 1951

Byron's first speaking film role was in Carol Reed's The Young Mr. Pitt (1942), in which she had two lines as a maid opposite Robert Donat. During World War II, she worked in Censorship and had appearances in several shorts for the British government's Crown Film Unit.

After Byron moved to the United States with her first husband, director Michael Powell persuaded her to return to Britain where she made perhaps her best remembered films. She was cast in several films of the Powell and Emeric Pressburger partnership: as an angel in A Matter of Life and Death (1946), the disturbed Sister Ruth in Black Narcissus (1947, for which she was nominated for Best Actress by the New York Film Critics' Circle), and in The Small Back Room (1949). Her success in Black Narcissus eventually led her to Hollywood, which resulted in a supporting role in Young Bess (1953). She found the experience unrewarding and soon returned to Britain. Her subsequent roles of the time were mostly in B-films.

On television, Byron had a recurring role from 1959 to 1963 as Margaret de la Roux in the soap opera Emergency Ward 10, portraying the alcoholic wife of the consultant gynaecologist Harold de la Roux (John Barron). In the 1960s and 1970s, Byron did extensive television work, including a 1961 appearance in a Danger Man episode entitled "Name, Date and Place" as Deidre; Crown Court (episode: "A Case of Murder"); a small role as Queen Louise of Denmark in Edward the Seventh (1975), Madame Celeste Lekeu in two episodes of the BBC drama Secret Army (1977), entitled "Bait" and "Good Friday", a brief stint on the soap opera Emmerdale Farm in 1979, and one of the leads in the daytime soap Together (1980–81, its second series broadcast live).

Byron continued to act into the 21st century, her film, theatre and television work including Agatha Christie's The Mousetrap (1990), an adaptation of Jane Austen's Emma (1996), Steven Spielberg's Saving Private Ryan (1998), Midsomer Murders (1999) (as Dorothea Pike in S2:E2 "Strangler's Wood") and Stephen Poliakoff's series, Perfect Strangers (2001).

== Personal life and death ==
In 1943, Byron married USAAF pilot, Lt. John Daniel Bowen, and moved to the United States. Byron was romantically linked with Michael Powell for a time, and he was named as a co-respondent when her first marriage was dissolved in 1950. In 1953, Byron married her second husband, the British journalist and writer Alaric Jacob (who predeceased her); Jacob was then working for the BBC. They had one son and daughter; with a child from Jacob's previous marriage.

Byron died on 18 January 2009, aged 88, at Denville Hall in Northwood, London. According to her stepdaughter, Byron had been suffering from cancer and Alzheimer's disease.

== Filmography ==
=== Film ===
Kathleen Byron film credits
Year	Title	Role	Ref.
1938	Climbing High	Model on Sofa (uncredited)	
1942	The Young Mr. Pitt	Millicent Grey (uncredited)	
1943	The Silver Fleet	Schoolmistress	
1946	A Matter of Life and Death	An Angel	
1947	Black Narcissus	Sister Ruth	
1949	The Small Back Room	Susan	
1949	Madness of the Heart	Verite Faimont	
1950	The Reluctant Widow (The Inheritance)	Mme. Annette de Chevreaux	
1950	Prelude to Fame	Signora Anne Bondini	
1951	Tom Brown's Schooldays	Mrs. Brown	
1951	Scarlet Thread	Josephine	
1951	Life in Her Hands	Ann Peters	
1951	Hell Is Sold Out	Arlette de Balzamann	
1951	I'll Never Forget You (The House in the Square)	Duchess of Devonshire	
1951	Four Days	Lucienne Templar	
1952	My Death Is a Mockery	Helen Bradley	
1952	The Gambler and the Lady	Pat	
1953	Young Bess	Ann Seymour	
1954	Star of My Night	Eve Malone	
1954	Profile	Margot	
1954	Night of the Silvery Moon	Jane	
1955	Handcuffs, London	Janet Tedford	
1955	Secret Venture	Renne L'Epine	
1961	Hand in Hand	Mrs. O'Malley	
1962	Night of the Eagle	Evelyn Sawtelle	
1968	Hammerhead	Lady Calvet	
1971	Private Road	Mrs. Halpern	
1971	Twins of Evil	Katy Weil	
1973	Nothing But the Night	Dr. Rose	
1973	Wolfshead: The Legend of Robin Hood	Katherine of Locksley	
1974	Craze	Muriel Sharp	
1974	The Abdication	Queen Mother	
1975	One of Our Dinosaurs is Missing	Colonel's Wife	
1980	The Elephant Man	Lady Waddington	
1981	From a Far Country	Tadek's Mother	
1996	Emma	Mrs. Goddard	
1998	Les Misérables	Mother Superior	
1998	Saving Private Ryan	Old Mrs. Ryan	
1998	Diary (Short)	Unknown	
2010	Cameraman: The Life and Work of Jack Cardiff	Herself	

=== Television ===
Kathleen Byron television credits
Year	Title	Role	Notes	Ref.
1957	ITV Playhouse	Rhoda Blair	Episode: "Not Proven"	
1959–1963	Emergency Ward 10	Margaret de la Roux	Recurring role	
1960	International Detective	Nurse Lemoine	Episode: "The Whitley Case"	
1961	Danger Man	Deidre	Episode: "Name, Date and Place"	
1961	ITV Play of the Week	Caroline Chesney	Episode: "All My Own Work"	
1961	Probation Officer	Mrs. Irwin	1 episode	
1961	Design for Murder	Elizabeth Carr	TV movie	
1964	Sergeant Cork	Capt Ruth Childers	Episode: "The Case of the Fourth Visitor"	
1965-1967	The Wednesday Play	Miss Stewart/Woman	2 episodes	
1965-1970	The Worker	Various	5 episode	
1966	Thirty-Minute Theatre	Eve Price	Episode: "Play to Win"	
1967	Who Is Sylvia?	Mrs. Proudpiece	7 episodes	
1968	The Portrait of a Lady	Countess Gemini	4 episodes	
1968-1978	ITV Playhouse	Miss Harvey/Mrs. Green	2 episodes	
1969-1973	ITV Saturday Night Theatre	Sylvia	2 episodes	
1969	Callan	Hannah Strickland	Episode: "You're Under Starter's Orders"	
1969	The Avengers	Miss Faversham	Episode: "Pandora"	
1969	Take Three Girls	Lily	Episode: "Stop Acting"	
1969	The Confessions of Marian Evans	Unknown	TV movie	
1970	Paul Temple	Mrs. Fairley	Episode: "Mr. Wallace Presents"	
1972	The Moonstone	Lady Verinder	3 episodes	
1972	The Golden Bowl	Fanny Assingham	Miniseries	
1972	Armchair Theatre	Elizabeth	Episode: "On Call"	
1972	The Edwardians	Agnes Baden-Powell	Episode: "Baden-Powell"	
1973	The Rivals of Sherlock Holmes	Miss Lyle	Episode: "The Mystery of the Amber Beads"	
1973	Sutherland's Law	Mrs. Connolly	Episode: "The Family"	
1974	The Little Mermaid	Queen	TV movie	
1974	Crown Court	Margaret Ellen Povey	3 serials	
1974	Notorious Woman	Jane Stirling	2 episodes	
1975	Edward the Seventh	Queen Louise of Denmark	3 episodes	
1976-1980	Angels	Mrs. Sheppard/Sister Dawson	3 episodes	
1977	Z-Cars	Mrs. Moffat	Episode: "Domestic"	
1977	Secret Army	Madame Celeste Lekeu	2 episodes	
1978	An Englishman's Castle	Mrs. Ingram	Miniseries	
1978	The Professionals	Mrs. Turner	Episode: "Everest Was Also Conquered"	
1979	Blake's 7	Clonemaster Fen	Episode: "Weapon"	
1979	General Hospital	Principal Nursing Officer Milner	Episode: "The Buck Stops Where?"	
1979	Emmerdale Farm	Irene Madden	4 episodes	
1979	Minder	Mrs. Hurst	Episode: "The Bounty Hunter"	
1980–1981	Together	Martha Finch	Regular role	
1981	Hedda Gabler	Juliana Tesman	TV movie	
1981	BBC2 Playhouse	Daphne Martin	Episode: "Unity"	
1982	Nancy Astor	Edith Cunard	Miniseries	
1983	Reilly, Ace of Spies	Madame Savinkova	Episode: "The Trust"	
1985	Howards' Way	Laura Deverill	Episode: "Too Late to Stop Now"	
1985	Theatre Night	Anne Marie	Episode: "Thunder Rock"	
1989	Gentlemen and Players	Aunt Millicent	Episode: "Inside Track"	
1989–1999	Casualty	Avril Maitland / Mrs. Anderson / Lizzie Burnley	3 episodes	
1990	Portrait of a Marriage	Lady Carnock	2 episodes	
1991	The Bill	Mrs. Macinally	Episode: "A Corporal of a Horse"	
1992	Moon and Son	Agnes Burley	Episode: "Nearly Dearly Departed"	
1994	The Memoirs of Sherlock Holmes	Mrs. Marker	Episode: "The Golden Prince-Nez"	
1997	Midsomer Murders	Dorothea Pike	Episode: "Strangler's Wood"	
2000	Dalziel and Pascoe	Daphne	Episode: "Cunnng Old Fox"	
2000	Heartbeat	Molly Rysinski	Episode: "War Stories"	
2001	In a Land of Plenty	Agatha	Miniseries	
2001	Perfect Strangers	Edith	Miniseries	

== Sources ==
- McFarlane, Brian (1997). An Autobiography of British Cinema: As Told by the Filmmakers and Actors who Made it. London: Methuen. pp. 103–104. ISBN 0-413-70520-X.
