= Hugh Burnett (producer) =

British television producer and cartoonist

- Born: Richard Hugh Burnett; 21 July 1924; Sheffield, England
- Died: 25 November 2011 (aged 87); Richmond, London, England
- Education: London School of Economics
- Occupations: Television producer, cartoonist

Richard Hugh Burnett (21 July 1924 – 25 November 2011) was a British television producer and cartoonist.

== Biography ==
Born in Sheffield, the son of a journalist who eventually became editor of the Methodist Recorder, Burnett studied at the London School of Economics. After finishing his National Service serving in India with the Intelligence Corps, Burnett joined the BBC's Far Eastern Service at Bush House in 1949. Personal Call, a radio series in which Burnett visited public figures of the day, was later developed into the series he produced for television, Face to Face, which consisted of interviews by John Freeman with prominent people from around the world.

Later, he became a documentary maker and made a sequence of films, often shot secretly, about apartheid: South Africa Loves Jesus (1971), outlining the attitudes of Christian denominations to the South African government's race policies, and The Colour Line (1971), in which a blood bank labels its stock according to the race of the donor. During the 1970s, he made three programmes about the supernatural and ghostly occurrences. These were The Ghost Hunters (1975), The Mystery of Loch Ness (1976) and Out of This World (1977), about UFOs.

His cartoons appeared in magazines such as the New Statesman, Private Eye, and The Oldie. The depiction of monks was a speciality; anthologies of his cartoons were published in the 1960s and 1970s in paperback under titles such as "Top Sacred" (1960), "Sacred and Confidential", and "Beware of the Abbot".

Hugh Burnett died on 25 November 2011 in Richmond, London, England. He was 87 and was predeceased by his wife, Simone Le Court de Billot (married in 1951) and their three sons.
