= My Boomerang Won't Come Back =

Single by Charlie Drake
- B-side: "She's My Girl"
- Released: 1961
- Recorded: 1961
- Genre: Novelty
- Length: 3:32 (original version); 2:44 (edited version)
- Label: Parlophone (UK), United Artists (USA)
- Songwriters: Max Diamond and Charlie Drake
- Producer: George Martin

"My Boomerang Won't Come Back" is a 1961 novelty record by British comedian Charlie Drake which became a hit in North America and the United Kingdom.

== Background ==
The tune concerns a young Aboriginal lad (with Drake's signature Cockney accent) cast out by his tribe due to his inability to toss a boomerang. After months of isolation (and fighting off "nasty bushwackin' animals"), the local witch doctor takes pity on the lad and tells him, "If you want your boomerang to come back/Well, first you've got to throw it!" He does, and proceeds to bring down an aeroplane, which crashes with a loud boom. "Oh, my Gawd," the lad says in horror, "I've hit The Flying Doctor!" The lad and the witch doctor argue over payment ("You still owe me fourteen chickens!") as the record fades out.

The record was produced by George Martin, who used studio tricks to approximate the sound of Aboriginal instruments.

== Controversy ==
"My Boomerang" is not exactly a paragon of political correctness, even by 1961 standards. In the song an Aboriginal meeting is described as a "pow-wow"—something more appropriate for Native Americans—while their chanting sounds more African than Aboriginal (many of the Aboriginal speakers in the song have either American or British accents). Most of all, Drake raised eyebrows with the line: "practised till I was black in the face".

After the BBC refused to play the tune (despite its popularity in record shops), a new version was recorded, substituting "blue in the face"; this version (on Parlophone Records) entered the UK charts in October and eventually peaked at No. 14.

When the song was initially released in the US it contained the "black in the face" lyric which was shortly changed to "blue". British-born talk-show host Michael Jackson, then on KEWB in Oakland, thought this was silly; he claimed "black in the face" was an allusion to George Black, a British theatrical and television producer. (In fact, the song names the witch-doctor as "George Alfred Black", but this has no clear connection to the "black in the face" line.)

== North American versions ==
United Artists released the record in America, and, not wanting to deal with complaints like the ones in Britain, issued a 45-only version that not only featured the line "blue in the face" but was considerably shorter than the UK version (which was 3:32), clocking in at 2:44 (the middle part was tightened up and the entire final bit about "The Flying Doctor" was excised, assuming American audiences would be unfamiliar with this service; after the sound of the flying boomerang, the song goes back into the chorus and fades out). The US version first hit the Billboard Hot 100 in January 1962 and peaked at No. 21, for what would be Drake's only American chart appearance. Another version would turn up on an American LP release, which was the same length as the US 45 but again contained the "black in the face" line.

The K-Tel compilation entitled "Looney Tunes" (K-Tel NU9140, 1976) contained the full 3:32 version, with "black in the face" included.

The record also did well in Canada, reaching No. 1 there.

Today, the "blue in the face" version remains mostly unavailable outside of the original single release.

== Australian reaction ==
At the time of its release, despite its less-than-respectful treatment of Aboriginal people, Australian record-buyers apparently had no problem with the original "black in the face" version. Musicologist David Kent has calculated that the song reached No. 1 there in December 1961, and a copy of the record has been archived by Music Australia. Australian musician Horrie Dargie's quintet recorded a response song, "My Boomerang Did Come Back" (1962), co-written by Nat Kipner, Johnny Devlin and Clyde Collins, which peaked in the top 100.

In 2015, the Australian Broadcasting Corporation banned the song, after a listener complained that it was racist. The ABC apologized after its Hobart-based radio program, Weekends, played the song in September of that year, at the request of a listener. Following the complaint, the broadcaster said it has removed the track completely from its system and taken steps to ensure "this would not happen again". The ABC's Audience and Consumer Affairs Department released a statement that the error was due to staff "not being familiar with the track’s lyrics".

== The Worker reference ==
The song is referred to in Drake's ITV sitcom The Worker. In the 1969 episode "Hello, Cobbler" (coincidentally, the only one to survive in a colour version), Charlie's eponymous character is hit on the head by a boomerang and hallucinates a bizarre Australian adventure (which sees the actors, including Drake himself, playing Aboriginal characters in blackface makeup). When he wakes up he asks, "What happened?" and is told, "Something you've always wanted—your boomerang came back!"
