= Charlie Drake (TV series) =

British TV comedy series (1958–1960)

- Genre: Sitcom
- Written by: Charlie Drake; Dave Freeman; Derek Collyer; David Cumming
- Starring: Charlie Drake
- Country of origin: United Kingdom
- Original language: English
- No. of series: 4
- No. of episodes: 22

Production
- Producers: Ernest Maxin; G.B. Lupino
- Running time: 30 minutes
- Production company: BBC

Original release
- Network: BBC Television Service
- Release: 11 November 1958 – 4 August 1960

Related
- Drake's Progress; The Charlie Drake Show

Charlie Drake is a British comedy television showed which aired on the BBC from 1958 and 1960. It starred the comedian Charlie Drake in a series of stand alone half-hour shows, sometimes billed as Charlie Drake In.... It was followed by The Charlie Drake Show.

== Cast ==
Drake was the only performer who appeared in all twenty two episodes, but a number of other actors made guest appearances including Sam Kydd, Patricia Bredin, Howard Lang, Michael Balfour, Ian Fleming, Jocelyn Lane, Denis Shaw, Geoffrey Sumner, Diane Clare, Ann Firbank, Hugh Lloyd, Gibb McLaughlin, Beatrice Varley, Rita Webb, Tutte Lemkow and Sandra Dorne.

== Bibliography ==
- Vahimagi, Tise . British Television: An Illustrated Guide. Oxford University Press, 1996.
