= Ian Lake =

British musician (1935–2004)

- Born: 26 January 1935; Quorn, Leicestershire
- Died: 12 August 2004 (aged 69); London
- Education: Royal College of Music
- Occupation: Musician. music teacher

Ian Lake (26 January 1935 in Quorn, Leicestershire – 12 August 2004 in London, England) was a pianist and composer who taught for many years at the Royal College of Music in London.

The son of working-class parents, he was educated at Trent College after winning a scholarship. After leaving school, he joined the army to undertake his National Service, playing the clarinet and viola in an army band. He subsequently entered the Royal College of Music on another scholarship. He began teaching at the college in 1966, eventually becoming a professor of piano.

In 1995, he was convicted of sexually abusing children and in the same year his teaching career at the Royal College of Music came to an end. Despite this, his career as a concert performer and recording artist continued. Since then several former pupils, both male and female, have come forward and described abuse they suffered from him.

== Personal life ==
Lake married twice. His first marriage ended in 1976 and his second ended in 1996. He had five children and five grandchildren.
