= 1960 Edinburgh Corporation election =

Local elections in Scotland

- 3 May 1960

24 of the 69 seats to the Edinburgh Corporation 35 seats needed for a majority
	First party	Second party
Party	Progressives	Labour
Last election	38	28
Seats before	39	28
Seats won	14	9
Seats after	39	28
Seat change	Steady	Steady
Popular vote	35,568	26,154
Percentage	52.9%	38.9%
	Third party	Fourth party
Party	Liberal	Protestant Action
Last election	1	1
Seats before	1	1
Seats won	1	0
Seats after	1	1
Seat change	Steady	Steady
Popular vote	5,292	N/A
Percentage	7.9%	N/A
- Results by ward.
Council control before election
Progressives
Council control after election
Progressives

Elections to Edinburgh Corporation were held on 3 May 1960, alongside municipal elections across Scotland. Of the councils 69 seats, 24 were up for election, including two seats in Murrayfield-Cramond ward. However only 15 wards in 14 seats were contested, as councillors were returned unopposed in nine wards.

No seats changed hands, and Edinburgh Corporation remained composed of 39 Progressives, 28 Labour councillors, 1 Liberal, and 1 Protestant Action. The Progressives retained overall control of the council.

Turnout in the 14 contested wards was 67,270 or 32.1%.

== Aggregate results ==
Edinburgh Corporation election, 1960
Party	Seats	Gains	Losses	Net gain/loss	Seats %	Votes %	Votes	+/−
Progressives	14	0	0	Steady	58.3	52.9	35,568	
Labour	9	0	0	Steady	39.1	38.9	26,154	
Liberal	1	0	0	Steady	4.3	7.9	5,292	
Communist	0	0	0	Steady	0.0	0.4	256	

== Ward results ==
Location of Broughton ward

Broughton
Party	Candidate	Votes	%
Progressives	Melville Dinwiddle	Unopposed	
Progressives hold			

Location of Calton ward

Calton
Party	Candidate	Votes	%
Progressives	Josephine Dickson	2,117	
Labour	J. S. Cook	1,798	
Majority		319	
Turnout			32.51
Progressives hold			

Location of Central Leith ward

Central Leith
Party	Candidate	Votes	%
Labour	J. A. Crichton	2,521	
Progressives	J. Tait	990	
Communist	T. C. Taylor	49	
Majority		1,531	
Turnout			27.06
Labour hold			

Location of Colinton ward

Colinton
Party	Candidate	Votes	%
Progressives	G. H. Menzies	3,289	
Labour	O. Hand	1,326	
Majority		1,963	
Turnout			27.89
Progressives hold			

Location of Corstorphine ward

Corstorphine
Party	Candidate	Votes	%
Progressives	Mary R. Murray	2,913	
Liberal	Rev. G. Carse	1,078	
Labour	W. Glass	831	
Majority		1835	
Turnout			32.37
Progressives hold			

Location of Craigentinny ward

Craigentinny
Party	Candidate	Votes	%
Labour	A. Sutherland	3,816	
Progressives	A. Hunt	2,451	
Majority		565	
Turnout			36.06
Labour hold			

Location of Craigmillar ward

Craigmillar
Party	Candidate	Votes	%
Labour	R. Fox	2,090	
Communist	J. A. Young	207	
Majority		1,883	
Turnout			23.33
Labour hold			

Location of George Square ward

George Square
Party	Candidate	Votes	%
Progressives	F. Stewart	2,010	
Labour	J. Henderson	793	
Majority		1,217	
Turnout			24.76
Progressives hold			

Location of Gorgie-Dalry ward

Gorgie-Dalry
Party	Candidate	Votes	%
Labour	T. McGregor	2,540	
Progressives	D. Buchanan	1,870	
Majority		670	
Turnout			29.94
Labour hold			

Location of Holyrood ward

Holyrood
Party	Candidate	Votes	%
Labour	Owen Hand	Unopposed	
Labour hold			

Location of Liberton ward

Liberton
Party	Candidate	Votes	%
Labour	J. W. Kerr	3,475	50.2
Progressives	Nicholas H. Fairbairn	3,445	49.8
Majority		30	0.4
Turnout		6,920	36.15
Labour hold			

Location of Merchiston ward

Merchiston
Party	Candidate	Votes	%
Progressives	Thomas Morgan	Unopposed	

Location of Morningside ward

Morningside
Party	Candidate	Votes	%
Progressives	Arthur G. Ingham	Unopposed	
Progressives hold			

Location of Murrayfield-Cramond ward

Murrayfield-Cramond
Party	Candidate	Votes	%
Progressives	H. Macpherson	3,290	
Progressives	R. M. Knox	3,190	
Labour	J. Keddie	998	
Labour	H. Hauxwell	859	
Turnout			29.65
Progressives hold			
Progressives hold			

Location of Newington ward

Newington
Party	Candidate	Votes	%
Liberal	Lady Hilda Morton	3,309	
Progressives	J. F. Wood	3,157	
Majority		152	
Turnout			39.06
Liberal hold			

Location of Pilton ward

Pilton
Party	Candidate	Votes	%
Labour	James M. R. Durkin	Unopposed	
Labour hold			

Location of Portobello ward

Portobello
Party	Candidate	Votes	%
Progressives	Elsie Matthews	3,583	
Labour	G. Drummond	1,871	
Majority		1,712	
Turnout			30.36
Progressives hold			

Location of Sighthill ward

Sighthill
Party	Candidate	Votes	%
Labour	William Wallace	Unopposed	
Labour hold			

Location of South Leith

South Leith
Party	Candidate	Votes	%
Progressives	Peter Heatly	3,361	55.4
Labour	P. S. Wood	2,706	44.6
Majority		655	10.8
Turnout		6,067	43.13
Progressives hold			

Location of St Andrews ward

St. Andrews
Party	Candidate	Votes	%
Progressives	Robert McLaughlin	Unopposed	
Progressives hold			

Location of St Bernards ward

St. Bernard's
Party	Candidate	Votes	%
Progressives	D. A. Adamson	3,092	
Labour	J. Brunton	1,389	
Liberal	Margaret Cameron	905	
Majority		1,712	
Turnout			30.16
Progressives hold			

Location of St Giles ward

St. Giles
Party	Candidate	Votes	%
Labour	James McInally	Unopposed	
Labour hold			

Location of West Leith ward

West Leith
Party	Candidate	Votes	%
Progressives	John Scott	Unopposed	
Progressives hold			
