= Behind the Headlines (1953 film) =

1953 film by Maclean Rogers

- Directed by: Maclean Rogers
- Written by: Maclean Rogers
- Produced by: Edwin J. Fancey
- Starring: Gilbert Harding; John Fitzgerald; Adrienne Fancey
- Cinematography: Geoffrey Faithfull
- Edited by: Robert Higgins
- Production company: E.J. Fancey Productions
- Distributed by: New Realm Pictures
- Release date: 9 October 1953
- Running time: 53 minutes
- Country: United Kingdom
- Language: English

Behind the Headlines is a 1953 British second feature ('B') semi-documentary crime film directed and written by Maclean Rogers and starring Gilbert Harding, John Fitzgerald and Adrienne Fancey.

== Plot ==
Broadcaster Gilbert Harding, playing a crime reporter, explains the behind-the-scenes work of Scotland Yard, as detectives investigate the theft of a lorry, which results in a conviction for murder.

== Cast ==
- Gilbert Harding
- John Fitzgerald
- Adrienne Fancey
- Vi Kaley
- Michael McCarthy
- Jack May
- Howell Evans
- Pat Hagen
- Arthur Mullard (uncredited)
- Graham Stark (uncredited)

== Reception ==
The Monthly Film Bulletin wrote: "A popular subject, treated in a popular and fairly interesting manner, though marred by a long and entirely unrelated sequence concerned with the details of the operation performed on the nightwatchman. Gilbert Harding is his usual ebullient self."

Kine Weekly wrote: "Upretentious yet intriguing pint-size dramatic crime documentary. ... Gilbert Harding, cast as a reporter, fills the leading role and speaks the commentary, and is a success both as actor and "compere." The majority of the supporting players also register, and the detail rings true."

Picturegoer wrote: "The actual case history, vividly illustrated, is not only ample proof that fact is stranger than fiction, but good entertainment, too – a welcome change from the conventional whodunit."

Picture Show wrote: "Crime drama told in documentary style, this film shows Scotland Yard's methods of bringing to justice the head of a lorry stealing racket who has also committed murder. Gilbert Harding has the role of a reporter and he is also the narrator, with high praise going to Scotland Yard who show us their interesting behind-the-scenes work."
