= Charlie Drake =

English comedian, actor, singer and writer (1925–2006)

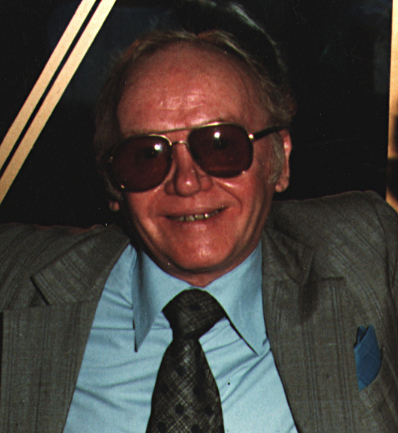
- Drake in 1986
- Born: Charles Edward Springall; 19 June 1925; Elephant and Castle, Southwark, London, England
- Died: 23 December 2006 (aged 81); Brinsworth House, Twickenham, London, England
- Years active: 1954–2004
- Spouses: Heather Barnes (m. 1953; div. 1971) Elaine Bird (m. 1976; div. 1984)
- Children: 3

Charles Edward Springall (19 June 1925 – 23 December 2006), known professionally as Charlie Drake, was an English comedian, actor, writer and singer.

With his small stature (5 ft 1 in or 155 cm tall), curly red hair and liking for slapstick, he was a popular comedian with children in his early years. He had a successful career in television, film and theatre between the 1950s and 1980s, becoming nationally known for his "Hello, my darlings!" catchphrase.

== Early life ==
Born Charles Edward Springall in the Elephant and Castle, Southwark, south London, the son of a street trader, he took his mother's maiden name for the stage and, later, film and television, achieving success as a comedian. Aged eight, he won a chorus place in a Harry Champion music hall production. He left school and home aged 14 to become an electrician's mate while attempting to break into showbusiness.

== Career ==
=== Early career ===
Drake made his first appearance on stage at the age of eight, and after leaving school toured working men's clubs. After serving in the Royal Air Force during the Second World War, Drake turned professional and made his television début in The Centre Show in 1953. He then joined his wartime comrade Jack Edwardes to form a double act, named 'Mick and Montmorency'; the pair appeared regularly on children's television, and in 1954 Drake appeared with Bob Monkhouse and Denis Goodwin in their BBC Television Service sketch comedy show, Fast and Loose.

=== Television success ===
He starred in the television shows Laughter in Store (1957), Drake's Progress (1957–58), Charlie Drake In… (1958 to 1960) and The Charlie Drake Show (1960 to 1961). He wrote many of his own scripts, and established a regular opening catchphrase, "Hello, my darlings!" He became one of the most successful comedy performers of the time, and appeared regularly in pantomimes. He also recorded several hit singles and appeared in character in relatively high-budget British films including Sands of the Desert (1960) and Petticoat Pirates (1961).

In 1961, a series of The Charlie Drake Show was brought to an abrupt end by a serious accident which occurred during a live transmission. Drake had arranged for a bookcase to be set up in such a way that it would easily fall apart when he was pulled through it during a slapstick sketch. It was later discovered that a carpenter, unaware of the setup, had "mended" the bookcase before the broadcast. The actors working with Drake, unaware of what had happened, proceeded with the rest of the sketch which required that they pick him up and throw him through an open window. Drake's skull was fractured and he was unconscious for three days. It would be two years before he returned to the screen.

=== Comeback ===
Drake returned to television in 1963 with The Charlie Drake Show, a compilation of which later won an award at the Montreux Festival in 1968. The centrepiece of this was an extended sketch featuring a performance of the 1812 Overture, in which Drake played all the instruments, as well as conducting, including one scene in which he was the player of a triangle waiting for his cue to play a single strike—which he subsequently missed. Through the series, he played a gymnast doing a single arm twist from a high ring while a commentator counted eventually into the thousands and by the end of the series, Drake's arm appeared to be 20 ft (6 m) long.

Television fame led to further films, none of them successful at the box office— The Cracksman (1963) and Mister Ten Per Cent (1967).

=== The Worker ===
In The Worker (ATV/ITV, 1965–70) he played a perpetually unemployed labourer who, in every episode, was dispatched to a new job by the ever-frustrated clerk (firstly Mr Whittaker in series one, played by Percy Herbert, and from series two onwards Mr Pugh, played by Henry McGee) at the local labour exchange. All the jobs he embarked upon ended in disaster, sometimes with a burst of classic slapstick, sometimes with a bewildered Drake himself at the centre of incomprehensible actions by the people employing him. Bookending these sequences were the encounters between Drake and the labour exchange clerk. Running jokes included Drake's inability to manage the name of the clerk, with Mr Whittaker rendered as Mr Wicketer and then Mr Pugh variously mispronounced from a childish "Mi'er Poo" to "Peeyooo". Drake sang the theme song himself, using an old music hall number. The series was briefly revived by London Weekend Television in 1978 as a series of short sketches on Bruce Forsyth's Big Night, with Drake and McGee reprising their roles.

Other shows included Who Is Sylvia? (1967) and Slapstick and Old Lace (1971), but it was The Worker that gained most acclaim.

=== This Is Your Life ===
He was the subject of This Is Your Life on two occasions: in December 1961, when he was surprised by Eamonn Andrews in a rehearsal room at the London Palladium, and in November 1995, when Michael Aspel surprised him at the curtain call of the comedy play Funny Money at the Playhouse Theatre.

=== Recording career ===
Drake made a number of records, most of them produced by George Martin for the Parlophone label. The first, "Splish Splash", a cover version of a rock and roll song originally recorded by Bobby Darin, got into the Top 10 of the UK Singles Chart, reaching No. 7 in 1958. In 1961, "My Boomerang Won't Come Back" became a mid-chart UK hit (No. 14) and an edited, more politically correct, version (with one word overdubbed) was a No. 21 US hit, a follow-up to "Mr. Custer" (No. 12 UK chart). In Canada it reached No. 1.

In 1972 Drake recorded a spoof song called "Puckwudgie" on Columbia Records. It referred to a 2-or-3-foot-tall (0.61 or 0.91 m) being from the Wampanoag folklore. It reached No. 47 in the UK Singles Chart in early 1972.

Peter Gabriel, after leaving Genesis in late 1975, produced a single "You Never Know" for Drake (UK Charisma), with Sandy Denny on backing vocals and Phil Collins on drums. It was not a chart success.

=== Later career ===
Drake turned to straight acting in the 1980s, winning acclaim for his role as Touchstone in Shakespeare's As You Like It (at the Ludlow Festival), and an award for his part in Harold Pinter's The Caretaker at the Royal Exchange, Manchester, along with Michael Angelis. Drake also starred as Smallweed in the BBC adaptation of Bleak House (1985), and Filipina Dreamgirls, a TV film for the BBC. His final appearances on stage were with Jim Davidson in Sinderella, his adult adaptation of Cinderella, as Baron Hardon. A live recording of one of the dates on the tour of the pantomime was later adapted, and edited for video, and put out for sale nationwide.

== Personal life ==
Drake was married twice. He was married to Heather Barnes from 1953 until 1971, and they had three sons. In 1976, Drake married his second wife, Elaine Bird, but the marriage was dissolved in 1984.

=== Retirement ===
Drake suffered a stroke in 1995 and retired, staying at Brinsworth House, a retirement home for actors and performers, run by the Entertainment Artistes' Benevolent Fund, until his death on 23 December 2006, after suffering multiple strokes the previous night.

== Discography ==
=== Singles ===
- "Splish Splash" / "Hello My Darlings" (1958) UK No. 7
- "Volare" / "Itchy Twitchy Feeling" (1958) UK No. 28
- "Tom Thumb's Tune" / "Goggle Eye Ghee" (1958)
- "Sea Cruise" / "Starkle Starkle Little Twink" (1959)
- "Naughty" / "Old Mr Shadow" (1960)
- "Mr. Custer" / "Glow Worm" (1960) UK No. 12
- "My Boomerang Won't Come Back" / "She's My Girl" (1961) UK No. 14; US No. 21; Australia No. 1
- "Tanglefoot" / "Drake's Progress" (1962)
- "I Bent My Assegai" / "Sweet Freddy Green" (1962)
- "I've Lost The End of My Yodel" / "I Can Cry Can't I" (1963)
- "I'm Too Heavy for the Light Brigade" / "The Reluctant Tight-Rope Walker" (1964)
- "Charles Drake 007" / "Bumpanology" (1964)
- "Only A Working Man" / "I'm A Boy" (1965)
- "Don't Trim My Wick" / "Birds" (1966)
- "Who Is Sylvia" / "I Wanna Be a Group" (1967)
- "Puckwudgie" / "Toffee and Tears" (1971) UK No. 47
- "Someone Opened the Watergate and They All got Wet" / "'Ello Erf" (1973)
- "You Never Know" / "I'm Big Enough for Me" (1975) (produced by Peter Gabriel) (Charisma Records 270)
- "Super Punk" (1976) (spoof record) (Note: Some sources claim that Drake was responsible for the spoof "Gimme That Punk Junk" (1976), recorded under the name The Water Pistols, but this may be due to confusion with his "Super Punk" (1976) (spoof). Dave Goodman's website refers to the two titles as separate entities.)

=== Theme tune from The Worker ===
Drake sang the theme song himself, based upon an old music hall song

I gets up every mornin' when the clock strikes eight
I'm always punctual, never never late
With a nice cup of tea, a little round of toast
The Sporting Life and the Winning Post.
I gets all nice and tidy, then I toddles off to work
I do the best I can
Cos I'm only a-doin' what a bloke should do
Cos I'm only a workin' man!

The song, "Only A Working Man", written by Herbert Rule and Fred Holt in 1923, was featured by Lily Morris on the music hall stage, and in the 1930 film, Elstree Calling, the original lyric being "He's only a workin' man".

== Filmography ==
| Year | Title | Role | Notes |
|---|---|---|---|
| 1954 | The Golden Link | Joe | |
| 1960 | Sands of the Desert | Charlie Sands | |
| 1960 | Charlie Drake Stirs it Up | Himself, with Cliff Richard | Pathé News Film i.d.1698.22. 28/11/'60. |
| 1961 | Petticoat Pirates | Charlie | |
| 1962 | What's Cooking | Himself, with Margaret Alden | British Pathé, (film i.d. 2275.05/2275.06) |
| 1963 | The Cracksman | Ernest Wright | |
| 1967 | Mister Ten Per Cent | Percy Pointer | |
| 1974 | Professor Popper's Problem | Professor Popper | |
| 1992 | Burning Ash | Ethan Hawker | Short film about practise of 'Skimington', a Charivari filmed in Copthorne, West Sussex |
| 1995 | Sinderella Live | Baron Hardon | Video |
| 2004 | Sinderella Comes Again | Baron Von Hard-on | Video |

== Television roles ==
Sources include The Radio Times Guide to TV Comedy, the BBC programme index and IMDb.

| Year | Title | Role | Notes | Company |
|---|---|---|---|---|
| 1954–1955 | Charlie Drake and Jack Edwardes | Montmorency | Children's sketch show | BBC |
| 1955 | Fast and Loose | Performer | Sketch show | BBC |
| 1955–1958 | Mick and Montmorency | Montmorency | Children's sketch show | Associated Rediffusion |
| 1956 | Tess and Jim | Performer | Stand-up comedy | BBC |
| 1956 | Jim Whittington and His Sea Lion | Idle Montmorency | Pantomime | Associated Rediffusion |
| 1956 | Beauty and the Beast | Wee Beastie (as Charles Drake) | Musical | BBC |
| 1957 | Laughter in Store | Self | Sitcom | BBC |
| 1957–1958 | Drake's Progress | Performer | Sketch show, 2 series, 12 episodes | BBC |
| 1957 | Pantomania: Babes in the Wood | Sheriff | Pantomime | BBC |
| 1958 | The Charlie Drake Show | Charlie | Sketch Special, 1 episode | ATV |
| 1958 | The World Our Stage | Performer | Variety, S1.E3: "The Driving Test" | BBC |
| 1958–1960 | Charlie Drake In... | Charles O'Casey Drake | Sitcom, 4 series, 22 episodes + special | BBC |
| 1960–1961 | The Charlie Drake Show | Charlie | Sitcom, 12 episodes | BBC |
| 1963 | The Charlie Drake Show | Charlie | Sketch show, 6 episodes | ATV |
| 1964 | The Ed Sullivan Show | Self | Variety, Episode 18.8 | CBS |
| 1965 | The Worker | Charlie | Sitcom, 2 series, 13 episodes | ATV |
| 1966 | Armchair Theatre | Joey | Play, Episode 6.9: "The Battersea Miracle" | ABC Weekend TV |
| 1967 | Who is Sylvia? | Charles Rameses Drake | Sitcom, 7 episodes | ATV |
| 1967–1968 | The Charlie Drake Show | Various | Sketch show, 11 episodes | BBC |
| 1969–1970 | The Worker | Charlie | Sitcom, 12 episodes + special | ATV |
| 1971 | Slapstick and Old Lace | Various | Sketch show, 7 episodes | ATV |
| 1972 | The Charlie Drake Comedy Hour | Various | Sketch Special, 1 episode | Thames |
| 1976 | Meet Peters & Lee | Self | Variety | ATV |
| 1979 | The Plank | The Delivery Man | Short film | Thames |
| 1980 | Rhubarb, Rhubarb | Golf Club Pro | Short film | Thames |
| 1985 | Masterpiece Theatre: Bleak House | Smallweed | Drama serial | BBC |
| 1988 | Ten Great Writers of the Modern World, Fyodor Dostoyevsky's Crime and Punishment | Marmeladov | Documentary | LWT |
| 1988 | Mr. H Is Late | Short Delivery Man | Short film | Thames |
| 1991 | Endgame by Samuel Beckett | Nagg | Play | BBC |
| 1991 | Screen One, "Filipina Dreamgirls" | Lionel | Play | BBC |
| 1995 | 99-1, "Dice" | Freddie Windsor | Crime series | Carlton |
