= Gilbert Harding =

English journalist and broadcaster (1907–1960)

- Harding, 1949
- Born: Gilbert Charles Harding; 5 June 1907; Hereford, England
- Died: 16 November 1960 (aged 53); Marylebone, London, England
- Education: Queens' College, Cambridge
- Occupations: Journalist, radio and television personality

Gilbert Charles Harding (5 June 1907 – 16 November 1960) was a British journalist and radio and television personality. His many careers included schoolmaster, journalist, policeman, disc jockey, actor, interviewer and television presenter. He also appeared in several films, sometimes in character parts but usually as himself – for example in Expresso Bongo (1959).

Harding had a sizeable role alongside John Mills in the 1952 film The Gentle Gunman. He played the lead in Behind the Headlines (1953 film). He narrated the introduction to the film Pacific Destiny (1956). He also made a couple of comedy recordings in 1953, with Hermione Gingold, on the Philips label: ' Takes Two to Tango ', and ' Oh, Grandma ' (Philips P.B.104), with Peter Yorke and His Orchestra.

== Early life ==
Harding was born in Hereford where his parents, Gilbert Harding and May King, were employed as "master" and "matron" of the city's workhouse. His father died in 1911 at the age of thirty following an appendicitis operation, and so his mother sent their son to board at the Royal Orphanage of Wolverhampton, "an excellent academy" which prepared him for his subsequent education at Queens' College, Cambridge. Due to the circumstances of his upbringing, Harding was fond of the "half-true" claim to have been "born in a workhouse and educated in an orphanage". His paternal grandparents, Gilbert William and Mary Priscilla Harding, were superintendents of the Children's Home at Caerleon, Newport, Wales; his maternal grandfather, Charles King, was in charge of the Hereford Union Workhouse, having previously worked at the workhouse in Aylesbury, Buckinghamshire.

After Cambridge, Harding took jobs teaching English in Canada and France. He returned to Britain and worked as a policeman in Bradford, before taking a position as The Times correspondent in Cyprus. In 1936 he again returned to Britain and began a long-term career with the BBC.

== BBC career ==
He was a regular on BBC Radio's Twenty Questions and was voted Personality of the Year in the National Radio Awards of 1953-4. Harding regularly appeared on the BBC television panel game What's My Line? as a panellist, having been the presenter of the very first episode in 1951.

Harding was notorious for his irascibility and was at one time characterised in the tabloid press as "the rudest man in Britain". His fame sprang from an inability to suffer fools gladly, and many 1950s TV viewers watched What's My Line? less for the quiz elements than for the chance of a live Harding outburst. An incident on an early broadcast started this trend when Harding became annoyed with a contestant, and told him that he was getting bored with him.

In 1960 he was reduced to tears on an edition of the Face to Face series, after being questioned by the host John Freeman. As the focus of the interview moved on to the subject of death, Freeman asked Harding if he had ever been in the presence of a dead person. At this point, in replying in the affirmative, Harding's voice began to break and his eyes watered. Freeman later said he had not anticipated the effect this would have; Harding had witnessed his mother's death in 1954. Freeman appeared to be unaware that Harding was referring to his mother, for later in the interview he asserted that Harding's mother was still alive. Harding contradicted him and Freeman moved quickly on. This version of events has been contradicted by the producer, Hugh Burnett. Freeman publicly expressed regret about this line of questioning. He was seen as a lonely bachelor. Harding also admitted in the programme that his bad manners and temper were "indefensible". "[I'm] profoundly lonely", he stated, later adding, "I would very much like to be dead."

== Death ==
Harding died a few weeks after the Face to Face programme was broadcast, collapsing outside Broadcasting House as he was about to climb into a taxi. The cause was an asthma attack. He was 53 years old.

== Media ==
Behind Harding's gruff exterior there was a lonely and complex man. In 1979, radio presenter Owen Spencer-Thomas on BBC Radio London's Gilbert Harding described him as "enigmatic ... bad-tempered and rude, yet his friends counted him as one of the kindest, and most generous."

The Face to Face interview was rebroadcast on BBC Four on 18 October 2005, following a repeated episode of What's My Line?. It was also broadcast in part on the BBC Four series 'Talk at the BBC'. A three-hour programme, The Rudest Man in Britain, was broadcast on BBC Radio 4 Extra in 2014 and has been repeated several times. This included interviews with people who knew and worked with Harding, and explored his life, personality, sexuality and influence in a non-judgemental way. It included the Face to Face interview in full, as well as episodes of programmes in which Harding was either Chairman or panel member. It ended with Stephen Wyatt's play Dr Brighton and Mr Harding.

In 2002, Harding was played by Edward Woodward, with Jonathan Cullen as his secretary, in Leonard Preston’s play Goodbye Gilbert Harding, which portrayed the final decade of Harding’s life.

== References and sources ==
Sources

- Grenfell, Stephen (ed.) (1961) Gilbert Harding By His Friends. London: Andre Deutsch (memories)
- Harding, Gilbert. (1953) Along My Line. London: Putnam (autobiography)
