= The Worker (TV series) =

- Genre: Sitcom
- Written by: Charlie Drake; Lew Schwarz
- Starring: Charlie Drake; Percy Herbert; Henry McGee
- Country of origin: United Kingdom
- No. of series: 5
- No. of episodes: 35 + 1 short

Production
- Running time: 35 minutes (13 episodes); 30 minutes (12 episodes); 15 minutes (10 episodes)
- Production companies: ATV (1965-70); LWT (1978)

Original release
- Network: ITV
- Release: 27 February 1965 – 24 December 1978

The Worker is a British sitcom that aired on ITV from 1965 to 1978. Co-written by and starring comedian Charlie Drake, the programme revolved around a man who has been dismissed from nearly 1,000 jobs.

== Cast ==
- Charlie Drake - Charlie
- Percy Herbert - Mr Whittaker (series 1)
- Henry McGee - Mr Pugh (series 2 onwards)
- Frank Williams - Vicar

== Plot ==
Charlie, although willing to work, has been dismissed from the 980 jobs that the local Labour Exchange has found him over the previous 20 years. Mr Whittaker, and later Mr Pugh, is the clerk at the exchange who tries to find Charlie a suitable job.

== Episodes ==
The first two series of The Worker, a total of thirteen 35 minute episodes, aired in 1965 on Saturdays at 8.25pm. The next two series - by now in colour - broadcast from 1969 to 1970, with the first airing on Mondays at 9.30pm and the second on Thursdays at 9.00pm. This time the twelve episodes were 30 minutes long. A short special as part of All-Star Comedy Carnival was shown on Christmas Day 1970. The final ten episodes - all of about 15 minutes duration - aired in 1978. The first eight were shown as part of Bruce Forsyth's Big Night, the ninth as a stand-alone programme and the final episode as part of Bruce Forsyth's Christmas Eve.

Due to the archival policies of the time, not all of the programme exist in the archives. The 1970 Christmas short is missing and is presumed wiped. All but the first episode of the third series and the entire fourth series exist only in black-and-white, though they were originally shot in colour.

=== Series One ===
| # | Episode Title | Original Broadcast Date | Plot |
|---|---|---|---|
| 1 | "The Machinery of Organisation" | 27 February 1965 | Charlie's job at a breakfast cereal company gets off to a slow start when his signing-in process takes all day. |
| 2 | "Out of the Mouths of Casual Labourers" | 6 March 1965 | Charlie applies for work at a self-help agency and ends up helping the helpers. |
| 3 | "The Mechanics of Piecework" | 13 March 1965 | Charlie is excited at the prospect of piecework at a generous rate per unit, until he discovers that each unit is a complex automaton that takes months to complete. |
| 4 | "No Automation Without Representation" | 20 March 1965 | Charlie uses his union connections to help out a brother worker who is set to lose his "dirty money". |
| 5 | "A Democratic Democratism" | 27 March 1965 | Charlie applies as a lift operator at a talent agency, but is spotted by a talent scout and ends up topping the bill at the London Palladium... or so he claims. |
| 6 | "And Never the Twine Shall Meet" | 3 April 1965 | Mr Whittaker retires to run a small grocery store - just before a major supermarket opens across the street. Charlie adopts a variety of disguises in an attempt to ward off the competition. |

=== Series Two ===
The closing logo for Series Two reads: "An ATV Production by arrangement with Bernard Delfont".

| # | Episode Title | Original Broadcast Date | Plot |
|---|---|---|---|
| 1 | "A Host of Golden Casual Labourers" | 2 October 1965 | Charlie is forced to wear a variety of humiliating promotional costumes, culminating with "The Daffodil Man". Not even a Wordsworth-inspired competition can endear him to the public. |
| 2 | "Eight and Thrupence" | 9 October 1965 | When Charlie is desperate for a loan his interview at a bank seems to provide the perfect opportunity, but all of the employees seem more interested in pursuing their various hobbies. |
| 3 | "Little Tom" | 16 October 1965 | Charlie's interview at a family firm causes him to become the intended victim in a bizarre murder plot. Worse still, there's no sugar in his tea. |
| 4 | "A Punting We Will Go" | 23 October 1965 | Charlie's addiction to betting on horse races is not helped by his getting a cleaning job at a betting shop. Later he joins Gamblers Anonymous and tries to help a man who is depressed at never being able to lose. |
| 5 | "Through a Glass Darkly" | 30 October 1965 | Inspired by "Doctor Frood", Charlie tries a spot of regression therapy, first to his infancy and then to his disastrous military service in World War II. |
| 6 | "The Man Who Moved His Head" | 6 November 1965 | Charlie is angry that an actor playing a corpse on television moved his head. Mr. Pugh thinks Charlie is developing an unhealthy obsession with TV. This seems to be borne out by Charlie's next company, where all of the departments remind him of TV shows. |
| 7 | "I Just Don't Want to Get Involved" | 13 November 1965 | Charlie thinks that getting involved leads to trouble, but he soon discovers that not getting involved can make things worse. |

=== Series Three ===
| # | Episode Title | Original Broadcast Date | Plot |
|---|---|---|---|
| 1 | "Hallo Cobbler" | 29 December 1969 | Returning to the Labour Exchange after a three-and-a-half-year absence, Charlie spins a tall tale about a trip to Australia, and then hallucinates the entire story after his boomerang comes back and hits him on the head. |
| 2 | "You Have Enjoyed the Sweets – Now You Must Suffer the Sours" | 5 January 1970 | After accidentally ingesting a bovine fertility drug, Charlie thinks he's pregnant and visits a maternity clinic. |
| 3 | "The Siege of Kidney Street" | 12 January 1970 | Charlie's newfound interest in ornithology clashes with his new job in demolition, causing him to stage a sit-in at a condemned house in which rare birds are nesting. |
| 4 | "Now Is The Time For All Left Legs" | 19 January 1970 | Charlie is inducted into a top secret Government project that will require him to spend four hours standing on one leg. |
| 5 | "When Adam Delved and Eve Span" | 26 January 1970 | After being interviewed in the street by a TV reporter, Charlie is upset when his interview is not shown on TV. Arriving at the studio to complain, he is confused to discover that he is an actor in a TV show called The Worker. |

=== Series Four ===
| # | Episode Title | Original Broadcast Date | Plot |
|---|---|---|---|
| 1 | "A Change Is As Good As A Rest" | 6 August 1970 | Charlie is contemplating a sex change, until Mr. Pugh tells him what it actually entails. A subsequent encounter with a handsome stranger fails to awaken Charlie's feminine side. |
| 2 | "Breed In For Speed, Breed Out For Stamina" | 13 August 1970 | Charlie dreams of marrying into the aristocracy and thinks his new job as a chimney sweep at a stately home will provide him with the opportunity. |
| 3 | "Cough" | 20 August 1970 | Charlie hopes to find a golden voucher in a promotional cigarette packet, which will give him the opportunity to win fabulous competition prizes. |
| 4 | "The Saucerer's Apprentice" | 27 August 1970 | Charlie is befriended by an alien being which resembles an animated pillowcase and eats plastic. |
| 5 | "Ma Chandelle Est Mort" | 3 September 1970 | Charlie falls into depression and takes to his bed. Mr. Pugh arrives to cheer him up with a Charlie-based edition of This Is Your Life... which soon becomes a nightmare. |
| 6 | "I Babble, Babble As I Flow to Join the Brimming River" | 10 September 1970 | Charlie's latest obsession is angling. When he learns that pollution has killed all the fish in his river, he persuades Mr. Pugh and the local vicar to join him in a protest at 10 Downing Street. |
| 7 | "No Room at the Inn For the Odd Couple Up the Staircase" | 17 September 1970 | When Mr. Pugh is evicted by his wife and can find no alternative accommodation, he is horrified to realise that his only option is to move in with Charlie. |

=== Christmas Special ===
| Episode Title | Original Broadcast Date |
|---|---|
| Christmas short | 25 December 1970 |

=== Series Five ===
| # | Episode Title | Original Broadcast Date |
|---|---|---|
| 1 | Episode One | 7 October 1978 |
| 2 | Episode Two | 14 October 1978 |
| 3 | "Self-Inflicted Compensation" | 21 October 1978 |
| 4 | "Bitter Bit" | 28 October 1978 |
| 5 | "Big Apple" | 4 November 1978 |
| 6 | Episode Six | 11 November 1978 |
| 7 | Episode Seven | 18 November 1978 |
| 8 | Episode Eight | 16 December 1978 |
| 9 | "A Worker's Christmas" | 17 December 1978 |
| 10 | Episode Ten | 24 December 1978 |

== DVD release ==
The 25 episodes from the first four series of The Worker were released on DVD on 28 May 2007. The colour episodes were presented in their surviving black and white versions with ITC Entertainment logos. The only surviving colour episode from the original series ("Hallo, Cobbler" with incomplete end titles) is included as an extra. This DVD also included episodes 3-5 from the 1978 series, claimed to be the only ones that survive, with introductions and endpieces by Bruce Forsyth.
