= Face to Face (British TV programme) =

British TV interview series (1959–1962, 1989–1998)

- Genre: Documentary
- Created by: Hugh Burnett
- Presented by: John Freeman
- Country of origin: United Kingdom
- Original language: English
- No. of episodes: 35

Production
- Producer: Hugh Burnett
- Running time: 30 minutes (episode); 1080 minutes (DVD release)
- Production company: BBC

Original release
- Release: 4 February 1959

Face to Face is a BBC interview television programme originally broadcast between 1959 and 1962, created and produced by Hugh Burnett, which ran for 35 episodes. The insightful and often probing style of the interviewer, former politician John Freeman, separated it from other programmes of the time. Face to Face was revived in 1989 with Jeremy Isaacs as the interviewer and ran until 1998.

== History ==
BBC talks producer Hugh Burnett had the idea of a simple personal interview programme in the mid-1950s. It took two years to persuade Grace Wyndham Goldie (assistant head of talks television) to commission a programme. Burnett decided on John Freeman as the interviewer "because he was highly skilled at probing closely without causing offence"; he asked Freeman while walking around the BBC block at Lime Grove Studios, and Freeman agreed by the second lap. Freeman had been a reporter on BBC TV's Panorama since 1957, and had also appeared as an interviewer on Press Conference.

The first Face to Face programme featured Lord Birkett, an advocate and a judge who had been involved in the Nuremberg trials; it had an audience of four million and a 'reaction index' (approval rating) of 83%. Face to Face episodes then appeared, irregularly, through 1959. The programme's best-remembered guests are Tony Hancock and Gilbert Harding, both of whom seemed disturbed by the questioning, but both of whom later endorsed Freeman's interview style. Harding wept as he recalled his relationship with his mother, while the programme with Hancock is considered to have been a contributing factor in his ultimate self-destruction because it is assumed to have enhanced his inclination to be self-critical. On one occasion an interviewee attempted rather underhand tactics to succeed in enduring his ordeal. The novelist Evelyn Waugh wrote to a mutual friend of Freeman and himself, the Labour politician Tom Driberg, asking for information to disarm his interlocutor during the proceedings.

Some potential guests whom Hugh Burnett wanted for the programme did not appear. His desire for the former-fascist leader Oswald Mosley to be "given a going over" by John Freeman was referred up to BBC Director General Hugh Greene who rejected the idea, fearing race riots would occur. An elusive Marlene Dietrich was finally tracked down to Paris but hung up after saying "you can't afford me". Shipping magnate Aristotle Onassis wanted advance knowledge of the questions which was refused.

John Freeman outlived all his subjects except for Albert Finney and Sir Stirling Moss.

== Format ==
Freeman's face was almost never shown. Apart from showing the back of his head, the cameras were concentrated on the subject, sometimes concentrating on a nervously smoked cigarette or a close-up of a face. The theme music was an excerpt from the overture to Berlioz' uncompleted opera Les francs-juges. The titles for each episode featured caricatures of that week's subject drawn by Feliks Topolski. Some episodes departed from an interview conducted at the BBC's Lime Grove Studios: the edition with Carl Gustav Jung was conducted at his home in Switzerland and Compton Mackenzie was in bed for his.

== Revival ==
Revived in 1989 with Jeremy Isaacs as its host, the questioner attempted to mimic the style of his predecessor with a similar interview technique. However, most of this later programme's subjects were more familiar with the medium than the earlier guests, so it was quite difficult to catch them off-guard. Some of these interviews were featured as part of the arts programme The Late Show. Running until 1998, the revival actually had a longer overall run than the original.

Isaacs himself was an interviewee in the revived series, facing James Naughtie.

The programme was again revived by ITV Wales in 2011, presented by its Political Editor, Adrian Masters. The programme had exactly the same format as the BBC version, but the purpose of the first series was to interview the leaders of the four main political parties in the lead-up to the 2011 Assembly elections. Carwyn Jones, Nick Bourne, Ieuan Wyn Jones and Kirsty Williams were all interviewed. Further editions were broadcast in 2012, in a non-election context, the first of which featured Peter Hain.

The Sky Arts programme In Confidence, originally broadcast in 2010 and presented by Laurie Taylor, features an identical format.

== Reshowing of episodes ==
Episodes of the original Face to Face were shown frequently on BBC Knowledge and still turn up occasionally on its successor BBC Four, especially during seasons such as The Lost Decade in October 2005. 30 of the original 35 episodes have been repeated, the exceptions being Nubar Gulbenkian, Roy Welensky, General Von Senger, Victor Gollancz and Danny Blanchflower. The soundtrack of the interview with Stirling Moss was issued on the 'B' side of an LP which also featured the soundtrack of the interview with Hancock. The BBC issued the original programme in a Region 2 DVD boxset in September 2009, complete apart from the interview with Albert Finney. The BBC has put up an online archive of selected programmes.

=== List of subjects ===
==== Original programme (1959–1962) ====
- Lord Birkett – 4 February 1959
- Bertrand Russell – 4 March 1959
- Dame Edith Sitwell – 6 May 1959
- Lord Boothby – 27 May 1959
- Nubar Gulbenkian – 15 July 1959
- Adlai Stevenson – 22 July 1959
- John Huston – 1 September 1959
- Carl Gustav Jung – 22 October 1959
- Lord Morrison of Lambeth – 18 December 1959
- King Hussein of Jordan – 1 January 1960
- Lord Shawcross – 10 January 1960
- Tony Hancock – 7 February 1960
- Henry Moore – 21 February 1960
- Dr Hastings Banda – 22 April 1960
- Augustus John – 15 May 1960
- Sir Roy Welensky – 29 May 1960
- Stirling Moss – 12 June 1960
- Evelyn Waugh – 26 June 1960
- Gilbert Harding – 18 September 1960
- General Von Senger – 2 October 1960
- Lord Reith – 30 October 1960
- Simone Signoret – 13 November 1960
- Victor Gollancz – 27 November 1960
- Adam Faith – 11 December 1960
- Otto Klemperer – 8 January 1961
- Frank Cousins – 15 October 1961
- Rev Dr Martin Luther King Jr. – 29 October 1961
- Lord Hailsham – 12 November 1961
- Jomo Kenyatta – 26 November 1961
- Sir Compton Mackenzie – 7 January 1962
- John Osborne – 21 January 1962
- Roy Thomson, 1st Baron Thomson of Fleet – 4 February 1962
- Cecil Beaton – 18 February 1962
- Albert Finney – 4 March 1962
- Danny Blanchflower – 18 March 1962

==== Revival (1989–1998) ====
- Anthony Burgess – 21 March 1989
- Merce Cunningham – 5 April 1989
- David Hare – 16 May 1989
- George Steiner – 31 May 1989
- Bernardo Bertolucci – 26 September 1989
- J. G. Ballard – 7 November 1989
- Oliver Sacks – 24 January 1990
- Claire Bloom – 15 February 1990
- James Fenton – 20 March 1990
- Roger Corman – 24 May 1990
- Oliver Stone – 11 September 1990
- Hans Eysenck – 16 October 1990
- Edmund White – 20 November 1990
- David Attenborough – 21 January 1991
- Vanessa Redgrave – 26 September 1991
- Norman Stone – 15 October 1991
- Jessye Norman – 10 February 1992
- Steven Berkoff – 21 May 1992
- Rod Steiger – 16 September 1992
- Susan Sontag – 10 November 1992
- John Schlesinger – 8 February 1993
- Derek Jarman – 15 March 1993
- Jonathan Miller – 12 May 1993
- Peter Hall – 23 September 1993
- Martin Amis – 25 October 1993
- David Hockney – 10 November 1993
- Kirk Douglas – 13 December 1993
- Joseph Heller – 17 January 1994
- Steven Spielberg – 31 January 1994
- Billy Connolly – 28 February 1994
- V.S. Naipaul – 16 May 1994
- Maya Angelou – 6 June 1994
- Jeanette Winterson – 20 June 1994
- Ken Loach – 19 September 1994
- Salman Rushdie – 19 October 1994
- Allen Ginsberg – 9 January 1995
- Arthur Miller – 13 February 1995
- Ken Dodd – 13 March 1995
- Lauren Bacall – 20 March 1995
- Anthony Hopkins – 18 September 1995
- John Berger – 2 October 1995
- Stephen Sondheim – 9 October 1995
- Martha Gellhorn – 16 October 1995
- Norman Mailer – 23 October 1995
- Paul Eddington – 30 October 1995
- Germaine Greer – 6 November 1995
- Harold Pinter – 21 January 1997
- Kate Adie – 28 January 1997
- Alan Parker – 4 February 1997
- Roddy Doyle – 11 February 1997
- Diana Rigg – 18 February 1997
- Bob Monkhouse – 25 February 1997
- Denis Forman – 13 October 1997
- Ben Elton – 12 January 1998
- Ian McKellen – 19 January 1998
- Joan Baez – 26 January 1998
- Martin Bell – 9 February 1998
- Yoko Ono – 16 February 1998
- David Mamet – 23 February 1998
- Jeremy Isaacs – 14 September 1998
