= Peter Lloyd (commentator) =

British TV sports commentator (1920–1976)

Peter Haswell Lloyd (16 November 1920 – 4 May 1972) was a British television sports commentator, who specialised in football commentaries. He is notable for having given, alongside former England captain Billy Wright, the first ever live television commentary on an English Football League match, when the second half of Blackpool versus Bolton Wanderers was shown by ITV on 10 September 1960. He is also the only lead commentator to have covered FA Cup Finals for both BBC and ITV.

Lloyd began his commentary career with BBC Television, working on various football matches from 1948 until 1955. He commentated on the FA Cup Final in both 1949 and 1950, and England's matches against Scotland and Italy in April and November 1949. As was the practice then, the commentary was split between Lloyd and Jimmy Jewell, the BBC's main television football voice of the time.

Lloyd subsequently worked for the commercial ITV network following its launch in 1955, covering its first live football match between Tottenham Hotspur and Vasas Budapest. He also worked on four FA Cup Finals and on the 1958 World Cup. He later provided football commentary for ITV regional companies TWW and Granada Television.

In the 1950s and 60s he also provided commentary for ITV on other sports such as figure skating and cricket, as well as on non-sporting events including royal wedding broadcasts in 1960 and 1961.

Lloyd also worked as a presenter, fronting ITV's Seeing Sport. This was a programme aimed at younger viewers, later described by The Stage newspaper as having been "the only regular and popular sports programme" of the network's early years. By the time of the publication of that article in The Stage in September 1976, Lloyd had died.

In November 1958 he overpowered an intruder who had invaded a neighbour's house; the neighbour's 11-year-old son having run to Lloyd's home to ask for help.
