= Henry McGee =

British actor (1928–2006)

- Born: Henry James Marris-McGee; 14 May 1928; South Kensington, London, England
- Died: 28 January 2006 (aged 77); Twickenham, London, England
- Resting place: Brompton Cemetery, London
- Education: Stonyhurst College
- Occupation: Actor
- Years active: 1950–2003
- Known for: Benny Hill's straight man

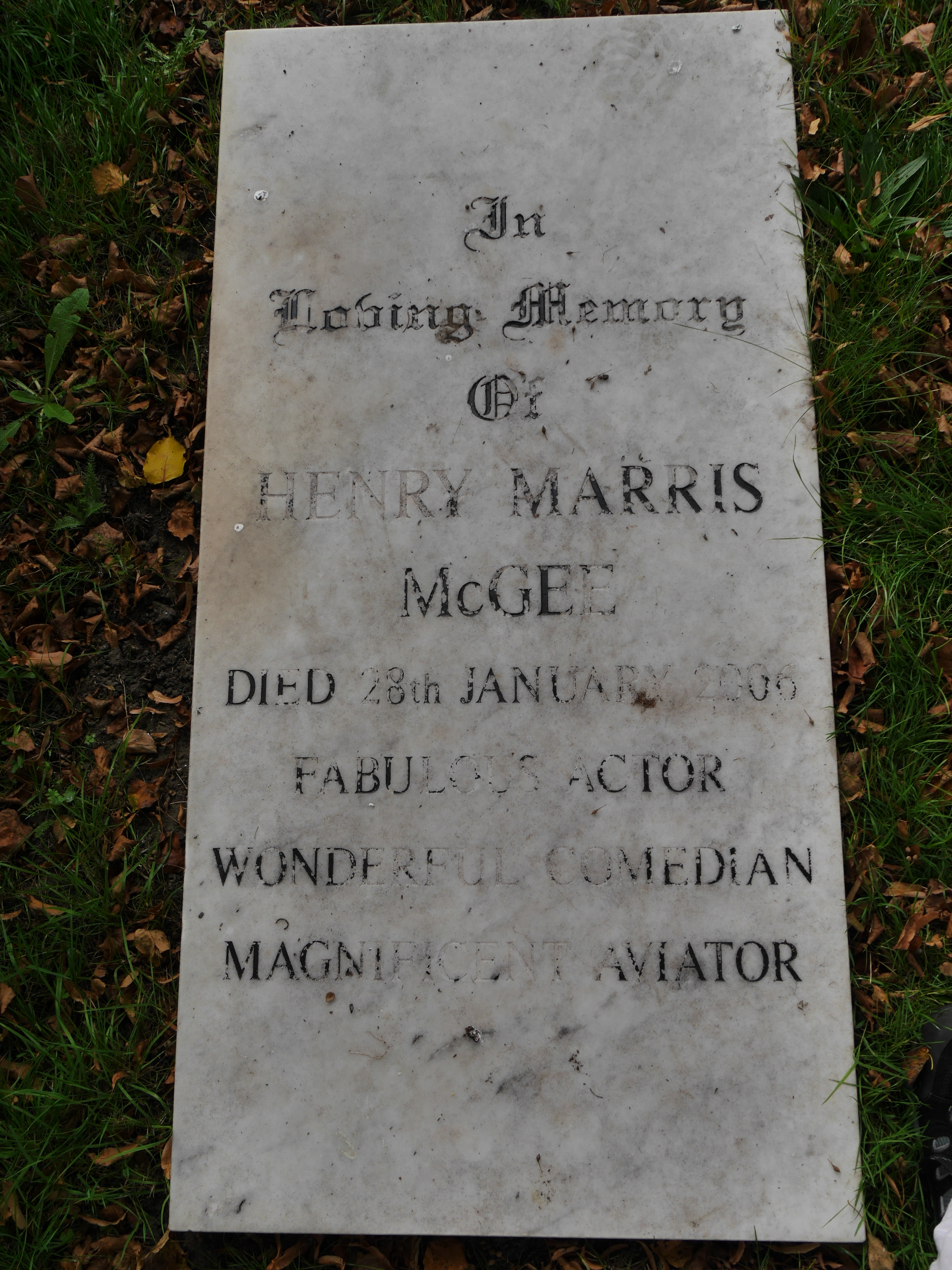
Brompton Cemetery monument

Henry James Marris-McGee (14 May 1928 – 28 January 2006), known professionally as Henry McGee, was a British actor, best known as straight man to Benny Hill for many years. McGee was also often the announcer on Hill's TV programme, delivering the upbeat intro "Yes! It's The Benny Hill Show!". He was familiar to British children throughout the 1970s as "Mummy" in the Sugar Puffs commercials, the catchphrase of which was "Tell them about the honey, Mummy".

== Biography ==
Born in South Kensington, London, and educated at Stonyhurst College, McGee hoped to become a doctor, but the death of his father when he was 17 put financial strains on the family that ended his plans. Having enjoyed acting as a boy, McGee decided to follow his mother's side of the family, which could trace its involvement in theatre back to Kitty Clive, and trained as an actor at the Italia Conti School.

He went on to play supporting roles in numerous films and television series, including The Diary of Samuel Pepys, The Italian Job (1969), The Saint and The Avengers. But it is for comedy roles that he is best remembered, primarily and most famously for his straight-man interviewer in The Benny Hill Show. He's also remembered by many as the 'mummy' of Honey Monster, a large, yellow, furry creature in advertisements for the breakfast cereal Sugar Puffs.

McGee played Two-Ton Ted in the video of "Ernie (The Fastest Milkman in the West)". Other comedy roles included the holiday centre manager in the 1973 film Holiday on the Buses, officious policemen in Adventures of a Taxi Driver (1976) and Revenge of the Pink Panther (1978), the TV presenter Harold Hump in Carry On Emmannuelle (1978), opposite Charlie Drake in the ATV/ITV situation comedy The Worker (1965–78), and There Was An Englishman, An Irishman and a Scotsman, a BBC Scotland comedy series written by Lew Schwarz. McGee was the Englishman, with Harry Towb as the Irishman and Roy Kinnear as the Scot. The show ran for one series in 1972. He also appeared in an episode of Rising Damp as a conman, Seymour. In 2003, he appeared in the episode "The Miraculous Curing of Old Goff Helliwell" in Last of the Summer Wine.

He had a long and successful stage career, starting at the Open Air Theatre, Regent's Park in 1950, subsequently receiving plaudits for deadpan delivery in such classic comedies as The Ghost Train, Plunder, The Man Most Likely To and Move Over, Mrs Markham.

== Personal life ==
McGee had one daughter, Stephanie (born November 1963). He spent his last six months in a nursing home, suffering from Alzheimer's disease. He is buried at Brompton Cemetery, London.

== Filmography ==
| Year | Title | Role | Notes |
|---|---|---|---|
| 1950 | Seven Days to Noon | Soldier Marching Next to Jackson | Uncredited |
| 1956 | Sailor Beware! | Milkman | Uncredited |
| 1965 | Fanatic | Rector | Uncredited |
| 1969 | The Italian Job | Tailor | Uncredited |
| 1973 | Digby, the Biggest Dog in the World | TV Announcer | |
| 1973 | Holiday on the Buses | Holiday Camp Manager | |
| 1974 | The Cherry Picker | Pilkington | |
| 1974 | The Best of Benny Hill | Various roles | |
| 1976 | Adventures of a Taxi Driver | Inspector Rogers | |
| 1977 | Come Play with Me | Deputy Prime Minister | |
| 1978 | Revenge of the Pink Panther | Officer Bardot | |
| 1978 | Carry On Emmannuelle | Harold Hump | |
| 1994 | Asterix Conquers America | Julius Caesar | Original version, Voice |
