= Menace from the Deep =

- Dad's Army episode
- Episode no.: Series 3 Episode 10
- Directed by: David Croft
- Story by: Jimmy Perry and David Croft
- Original air date: 13 November 1969
- Running time: 30 minutes

Episode chronology
← Previous "War Dance"	Next → "Branded"

"Menace from the Deep" is the tenth episode of the third series of the British comedy series Dad's Army. It was originally transmitted on Thursday 13 November 1969.

== Synopsis ==
Marooned on the pier head, the platoon have no food or phone – then along comes Hodges and a sea-mine.

== Plot ==
Two sailors are patrolling the Walmington-on-Sea pier. They grumble that no one will be coming down to look after it for two weeks. They laugh as they realise the Home Guard will have to take over each night for a week.

The platoon are discussing their latest assignment which involves a trip to the pier. They have a boat but it will only hold three people at a time which means they will have to make several trips. Frazer is chosen to take them over to the pier in the boat, because he has the best Naval experience. Jones will provide food for the night, Walker will bring along a bottle of whisky and Wilson's brought some acid drops – clearly it will be a "gastronomic orgy", according to Wilson. However, when Mainwaring attempts to teach them how to get into a boat, he and Frazer have a falling out and it is determined that Mainwaring will row them over, so it takes longer than expected to get Wilson and Frazer across.

As Pike is the last man across, he will be in charge of securing the boat. Mainwaring quickly commandeers the only hammock, but Wilson persuades him that they should take it in turns, but Mainwaring will go first. Pike secures the boat, but leaves the food in it, so he goes to fetch it. However, he comes back dejected: he had tied the boat to the thinner telephone cable rather than the sturdier electricity cable (because he "didn't want to get electricity-fied"), but the boat is now gone, with all the food on it (with the exception of Wilson's acid drops), and has disconnected the telephone. The platoon are cut off.

Walker suggests using the window to signal Morse code to the shore to get help. ARP Warden Hodges spots it and rows out in a children's paddle boat to try to get them to switch it off. The boat sinks, and Hodges is stranded with the platoon. To calm him down, Walker gives him his bottle of whisky. Pike spots a crane game where the prize is chocolate. Frazer is the only one with pennies, but they fail at each attempt, so Walker steals some chocolate from inside the machine. All but one are cardboard, to the great distaste of everybody – except Frazer, who quickly scoffs his genuine bar of chocolate.

Late in the night, the platoon are woken to Hodges' drunken singing. Mainwaring orders him to "shut up", and after a brief struggle with the angry (and half-naked) Warden, Mainwaring comments to Wilson "Well, what do you expect from a tradesman?" It is decided that Hodges should have the hammock so he can get some sleep.

At about 5:45 am, Jones sees an unusual object through the floorboards, and alerts Mainwaring, who identifies it as a mine. They wake everybody up and they try to hook it. Hodges scoffs at their attempts and tries to hook it himself. However, he falls in the water again and, when the mine turns out to be magnetic, has to remove his metal helmet to prevent it following him.

The platoon set up the Lewis Gun and fire at it with their rifles. However, they soon run out of ammo as the mine edges closer to Walmington. A soaking Hodges joins them and, using his expert bowling skills, manages to blow up the mine with a wooden boule. Mainwaring is impressed, and Wilson adds "He's even better with his clothes on."

== Cast ==
- Arthur Lowe as Captain Mainwaring
- John Le Mesurier as Sergeant Wilson
- Clive Dunn as Lance Corporal Jones
- John Laurie as Private Frazer
- James Beck as Private Walker
- Arnold Ridley as Private Godfrey
- Ian Lavender as Private Pike
- Bill Pertwee as ARP Warden Hodges
- Stuart Sherwin as 2nd ARP Warden
- Bill Treacher as 1st Sailor
- Larry Martyn as 2nd Sailor

== Notes ==
- On-location footage for this episode was filmed on Great Yarmouth's Britannia Pier.
- This is the first episode to feature Hodges wearing a white helmet and a chief warden's uniform, rather than his more familiar black helmet with a suit and tie.
- Frazer was previously shown to be an expert at shooting mines in "Shooting Pains," but is unable to do so here. However, this time he is not wearing his glasses, is using a Lewis gun instead of a rifle, and has forgotten to wave it up and down to simulate the motion of the minesweeper he is used to.
