= Branded (Dad's Army) =

- Dad's Army episode
- Episode no.: Series 3 Episode 11
- Directed by: Harold Snoad
- Story by: Jimmy Perry and David Croft
- Original air date: 20 November 1969
- Running time: 30 minutes

Episode chronology
← Previous "Menace from the Deep"	Next → "Man Hunt"

"Branded" is the eleventh episode of the third series of the British comedy series Dad's Army. It was originally transmitted on Thursday 20 November 1969. In the episode's plot, Private Godfrey (played by Arnold Ridley) admits that he was a conscientious objector during the Great War.

On a night of programmes devoted to Dad's Army, Jimmy Perry named it his favourite episode. "When we told Arnold that we'd written a part especially for him, he was absolutely delighted. When he read the script, he said, 'Jimmy, even if you just say quite simple things, it's good to mention "conchies"...because they went through hell, a lot of them; and a lot of them had high principles...I'm very honoured to play it.'...John Laurie and Arnold Ridley had both served in the First World War, and both served in the Battle of the Somme...John Laurie managed to come through it OK, but Arnold Ridley was dreadfully, badly wounded...We all knew about the war. I think, perhaps...that's what gives Dad's Army, as Clint Eastwood says in Pale Rider, gives that 'little bit of edge'...It's quite [a] serious [episode]. And in the end, dear old Godfrey is proved to have more courage than all the rest of them put together".

== Synopsis ==
Private Godfrey reveals that he refused to fight during the First World War, thus putting a strain on his friendship with the men.

== Plot ==
Following a standard exercise on the stealthy approach to an enemy soldier, Captain Mainwaring calls Sergeant Wilson into his office. He has received an alarming letter from Godfrey, informing the captain of Godfrey's intent to resign from the unit at the earliest possible convenience. Given Godfrey's vital role in the platoon (as the soldier who makes the tea), Mainwaring is unwilling to let Godfrey go, and demands an explanation. Godfrey thus tells him that his decision emerges from a recent incident in which he found a mouse in his kitchen, but found himself unwilling and incapable of killing it, and says if he cannot kill a mouse, "how can he be expected to kill a German?" During the telling of the story, Godfrey reveals that in the previous war, he was a conscientious objector who refused to fight.

Mainwaring, appalled and disgusted, orders Godfrey to get out of his sight; whilst Wilson is tolerant and understanding of Godfrey's need to follow his conscience, Mainwaring is sickened at the thought of a man not wanting to fight and, assuming Godfrey to be a coward, determines to shame and humiliate him in front of the troops. With characteristic pompousness, he convenes a parade of the remainder of the platoon to inform them of Godfrey's apparent cowardice, but his thunder is stolen by the unimpressed ARP Warden Hodges, who wants to discuss an upcoming ARP/Home Guard drill.

Once the platoon learns of Godfrey's past, opinion is divided. Many, including Corporal Jones, are undecided about their response to Godfrey's decision, and some, including Pike and Walker, do not especially care. However, Frazer is characteristically vocal in his condemnation of Godfrey's "cowardice", and has no hesitation in expressing his disgust to Godfrey's face. This is shown when they are out on patrol and Godfrey turns up with some cakes for everyone, they all turn them down (apart from Pike, who happily accepts one but Frazer knocks it out of his hands) and leave him behind. It is decided that Godfrey will remain in the unit until a replacement can be found.

The training drill arrives, during which Warden Hodges will teach the men how to retrieve unconscious bodies (represented by sacks of straw) from burning buildings filled with smoke. Naturally, Mainwaring is unimpressed by the volume of smoke in the building and fills the boiler with burning rags, thus filling the building with far more smoke than safely required. He also informs Godfrey that he has no intention of letting him use his "conchie tricks" to get out of the exercise (not that Godfrey had any intention of trying to get out of it), and intends to follow Godfrey through the hut to make sure that he completes the exercise.

Godfrey completes the exercise and waits outside the hut's exit for Mainwaring. However, Mainwaring does not appear, despite taking longer to conduct the exercise than expected. Without hesitation, Godfrey re-enters the smoke-filled hut in order to retrieve Mainwaring, who had fainted due to smoke inhalation.

Later, Godfrey recuperates from the training exercise in bed, having also experienced smoke inhalation, and is visited by the entire platoon, having overcome their earlier feelings for him in concern for his health. As Mainwaring attempts to express uncomfortable gratitude to Godfrey for saving his life, he notices a photo of a younger Godfrey, in military uniform, wearing the Military Medal. Godfrey's sister Cissy explains that, whilst refusing to fight in the First World War, Godfrey instead joined the Royal Army Medical Corps as a stretcher bearer, and was responsible, during the Battle of the Somme, for a tremendous act of heroism in rescuing several wounded soldiers from No Man's Land under heavy fire (which, with characteristic modesty, he downplays, and he refuses to wear his medal on the grounds that it feels "ostentatious"). Embarrassed at their earlier treatment of him as a coward (although Frazer, typically, insists that he knew it would be the case all along), the platoon apologise, and at Wilson's suggestion, Mainwaring has no hesitation in declaring Godfrey the platoon's new medical orderly, having learnt that heroism is not a matter of appearance.

== Cast ==
- Arthur Lowe as Captain Mainwaring
- John Le Mesurier as Sergeant Wilson
- Clive Dunn as Lance Corporal Jones
- John Laurie as Private Frazer
- James Beck as Private Walker
- Arnold Ridley as Private Godfrey
- Ian Lavender as Private Pike
- Bill Pertwee as ARP Warden Hodges
- Nan Braunton as Miss Godfrey
- Stuart Sherwin as Bill (2nd ARP Warden)
- Roger Avon as Doctor

== Notes ==
1. Although the entire third series of Dad's Army was produced in colour, the early episodes were first transmitted before the launch of BBC1's colour service on 15 November 1969. "Branded" was the first episode to be transmitted in colour.
2. The episode was repeated on BBC1 in March 1984 as a tribute to Arnold Ridley following his death.
