= No Spring for Frazer =

- Dad's Army episode
- Episode no.: Series 3 Episode 13
- Directed by: David Croft
- Story by: Jimmy Perry and David Croft
- Original air date: 4 December 1969
- Running time: 30 minutes

Episode chronology
| ← Previous "Man Hunt" | Next → "Sons of the Sea" |

"No Spring for Frazer" is the thirteenth episode of the third series of the British comedy series Dad's Army. It was originally transmitted on Thursday 4 December 1969.

== Plot ==
Mainwaring is preparing to march the platoon over to the recreation ground for a lecture on fieldcraft. Wilson enters the office, informing him that Pike and Jones are ready for him to inspect their rifles, and Frazer is ready with the Lewis gun. Mainwaring inspects Jones' rifle and reminds him not to leave sausage skins in the magazine again. He also reminds Pike not to let his mother clean his rifle with a bath brick. Frazer is relieved to not have to clean the Lewis Gun again for three weeks, but Mainwaring notices that the butterfly spring is missing, and Frazer surmises that it is in his workshop.

Mainwaring marches the platoon to Frazer's workshop and Frazer searches for the box where he keeps his tools, believing the spring is there, but it has gone. Mainwaring asks him what the box was like, and is shocked to learn that it is shaped like a coffin. Frazer tells him that when he was young, he learnt how to make coffins and perform dentistry on the Isle of Mingulay. He remembers that Mr Drury, an undertaker, would probably have taken it, so the platoon heads there.

Mr Drury is in a hurry and does not stop to speak with Frazer and Jones. They instead speak with his secretary, Miss Baker, who confirms the use of the coffin. Frazer asks if it is still there, but Miss Baker reveals it is now occupied by a Mr Horace Bluett. Jones and Frazer are shocked, and are even more shocked to learn that his brother Sidney wanted him to repose on his dining room table.

Jones and Frazer worm their way into Mr Bluett's house, and Jones distracts Mr Bluett while Frazer searches the coffin. Mr Bluett tells Jones that his brother came home after buying best end of neck from Jones, looked at it, and cried: "Look at that! All bloody bone!" before collapsing and dying from the shock. Jones takes offence at the comment and claims Mr Bluett is accusing him of "doing in" his brother, and drags Frazer out of the house in indignation before he has had a chance to fully inspect the coffin.

Mainwaring rings GHQ to enquire about spare springs, but none is in stock. Walker has a friend who is a metal worker, but he cannot help them because he is currently in prison. So, Mainwaring decides that they should return to Mr Bluett's house that night and break in after Mr Bluett has gone to bed. However, when Jones and Frazer climb into the dining room via the kitchen window, they are shocked to find that the coffin lid is screwed down. They attempt to unscrew it with Pike's scout knife, but they are interrupted by Mr Bluett coming down the stairs and quickly make their exit.

The next morning, while Frazer is officiating Horace's funeral, the platoon arrives at the churchyard, just as the procession arrive at the grave. They stick a "Danger! Unexploded Bomb" sign in the ground and warn the vicar and the mourners that there is an unexploded bomb in the churchyard. However, it is just a ruse to clear the churchyard. Later, Jones' section arrives at the grave to retrieve the spring. Jones reluctantly climbs inside to check, but they are interrupted by the verger, who has come to fill in the grave. However, they are unable to remove Jones from the grave, so the verger is understandably surprised when the earth he digs into the grave is flung back at him.

The verger confronts the platoon, who manage to cover up the event until he leaves. Mainwaring admits he must report Frazer to GHQ for court-martial but, just in the nick of time, Frazer discovers the butterfly spring in his trouser pocket.

== Cast ==
- Arthur Lowe as Captain Mainwaring
- John Le Mesurier as Sergeant Wilson
- Clive Dunn as Lance Corporal Jones
- John Laurie as Private Frazer
- James Beck as Private Walker
- Arnold Ridley as Private Godfrey
- Ian Lavender as Private Pike
- Edward Sinclair as The Verger
- Frank Williams as The Vicar
- Harold Bennett as Mr Bluett
- Joan Cooper as Miss Baker
- Ronnie Brandon as Mr Drury

== Notes ==
1. This is the first episode to show Frazer as a coffin maker, who later in the series is revealed to be a Funeral Director.
2. In this episode Frazer claims to come from the island of Mingulay, evacuated in 1912, although he later claims to come from the neighbouring Isle of Barra.
3. This was the first appearance in Dad's Army of Arthur Lowe's wife, Joan Cooper, who played Godfrey's sister Dolly in later episodes.

== Radio episode ==
In the TV series, Frazer's profession had previously been given as keeping a philatelist's shop, and only later is it shown that he is or has become an undertaker. Thus, Mainwaring and Wilson are surprised that he has coffins in his possession, with Wilson saying they are "an extraordinary thing to collect."

This dialogue is retained in the radio edition, but is followed by an additional observation from Wilson that "we all knew you were an undertaker". Frazer goes on to explain that he makes coffins for his own use as well as supplying Mr Drury.
