= Battle School (Dad's Army) =

- Dad's Army episode
- Episode no.: Series 3 Episode 2
- Directed by: David Croft
- Story by: Jimmy Perry and David Croft
- Original air date: 18 September 1969
- Running time: 30 minutes

Episode chronology
← Previous "The Armoured Might of Lance Corporal Jones"	Next → "The Lion Has Phones"

"Battle School" is the second episode of the third series of the British comedy series Dad's Army. It was originally transmitted on 18 September 1969. The episode was recorded Sunday 1 June 1969.

== Synopsis ==
The Home Guard go on a weekend guerrilla warfare exercise. If they ever manage to find it, they have to capture their Captain's HQ.

== Plot ==
The platoon are travelling by train to a battle school in the country. Save for an incident involving Godfrey's weak bladder, the journey is uneventful. Disaster strikes when they arrive at the station; Mainwaring opens the secret instructions, and it is clear that he does not know how to read a map. They start off confidently, but soon find themselves back at the station. They try again and Mainwaring leads them into an ambush led by a rugged captain.

When they finally reach the school, they are greeted by a cheery Major Smith, who then proceeds to tell them that, to the platoon's horror, they have missed the evening meal by four hours. He introduces them to Captain Rodrigues, a tough Spanish officer (the one who had led the ambush) who fought in the Spanish Civil War and does not approve of military disciplines such as arm-waving. He gives Mainwaring and the platoon a "Palliasse" and a single blanket each to keep them warm as well as some carrots and onions to eat. Most of the men are annoyed at all this and at Mainwaring for their late arrival (except for Jones, who still characteristically trusts him).

Rodrigues wakes up the sleeping platoon late in the morning with a thunderflash, telling them that they have missed breakfast as well. Rodrigues hints that they will have an opportunity to capture his HQ; unfortunately, no one has succeeded due to the fierce Alsatians, barbed wire and the electric fence. The men are soon put to the test, which involves various misfortunes for Mainwaring, such as falling into a deep river, falling from a deliberately cut rope during a Tyrolean traverse and clumsily falling into the mud while crossing some balance beams. Meanwhile, Walker, fed up with the lack of food, is determined to search for something good at a nearby farm, but is scared off by the unimpressed farmer.

By lunchtime, the platoon is handed what is clearly a quickly made meal. As the exercise continues, Mainwaring falls down a hole, finds a secret tunnel and discovers it leads to Rodrigues' HQ. Later that night, having been missing all afternoon, he returns and tells the platoon about his discovery, and begins laying out his plan to capture the HQ via the tunnel. When the platoon emerges from the tunnel, they discover they are in the HQ's food stores and just outside a room where Rodrigues and Smith are laughingly discussing the platoon's poor performance. As Mainwaring prepares to lead the assault to capture the HQ, Walker eagerly volunteers to stay behind in the storeroom, ostensibly to guard the platoon's rear.

On the train home, the platoon's spirits are high again, singing "We'll Meet Again" and laughing as they recall seeing the shocked look on Rodrigues' face when they captured his HQ. Mainwaring is relieved to find himself in his men's good graces again, though laments that he felt the platoon deserved a more tangible reward. Walker then reveals that he is fully laden with food, as whilst the others were dealing with Rodrigues, he was cleaning out the stores.

== Cast ==
- Arthur Lowe as Captain Mainwaring
- John Le Mesurier as Sergeant Wilson
- Clive Dunn as Lance Corporal Jones
- John Laurie as Private Frazer
- James Beck as Private Walker
- Arnold Ridley as Private Godfrey
- Ian Lavender as Private Pike
- Alan Tilvern as Captain Rodrigues
- Alan Haines as Major Smith
- Colin Bean as Private Sponge

== Notes ==
1. The opening shot of the episode was taken from The Titfield Thunderbolt released in 1953. Stock footage was required as the location being used for their arrival was Wendling railway station, which had recently been closed by British Railways. Wendling station was also used on the episode "The Day the Balloon Went Up".
2. The area where the main exterior filming took place was also used for the new shots for the end credits (necessitated as the end credits for the previous two series had been filmed in black and white). A reminder of this episode was therefore present for the rest of the run of Dad's Army, with the cast walking past the trees in front of which the Spanish Captain is briefly seen standing holding a megaphone, and the shot of the platoon running across an open heath was used at the very end of all subsequent episodes under the producer's credit.
3. The idea of the platoon getting lost on their way to a training base and subsequently missing supper and breakfast was re-used in the 1971 film.
4. When the platoon is trying to find the battle school, they are whistling the tune of "Who Do You Think You Are Kidding, Mr Hitler?", the opening theme song of the series.

== Historic background ==
The "Battle Camp" is similar to the school of guerrilla warfare that existed in Osterley Park at the beginning of the war. Like the one in the episode, the real-life camp instructed Home Guardsmen in irregular warfare in case of Nazi invasion. The Osterley camp was even run by Spanish Civil War veteran Tom Wintringham, much like the one in the episode.
