= Man Hunt (Dad's Army) =

- Dad's Army episode
- Episode no.: Series 3 Episode 12
- Directed by: David Croft
- Story by: Jimmy Perry and David Croft
- Original air date: 27 November 1969
- Running time: 30 minutes

Episode chronology
← Previous "Branded"	Next → "No Spring for Frazer"

"Man Hunt" is the twelfth episode of the third series of the British comedy series Dad's Army. It was originally transmitted on Thursday 27 November 1969.

== Synopsis ==
Walker brings along a tracker dog for the platoon and several dozen pairs of knickers for the ladies of Walmington-on-Sea.

== Plot ==
It is eighteen months since the outbreak of World War II and Captain Mainwaring is giving a lecture on the progress of the war, and admits that they have thrown the Allies out of Greece and Crete, but reminds them that Rudolf Hess surrendered not too long ago, so the "rats are leaving the sinking ship". However, he tells the platoon that the enemy are dropping empty parachutes to confuse the people, and if they spot one, they must report it to GHQ. Jones wonders what the difference is between British parachutes and Nazi parachutes. Mainwaring's memo tells him that British parachutes are white, while Nazi parachutes are a "dirty, creamy, off-white". Frazer points out that the parachutist may be miles away by the time they find the parachute, so Walker decides to bring a tracker dog to the next parade.

After the parade, Jones decides to go to the pub, but Walker has to talk to Mainwaring. He confides in Mainwaring and Wilson that he found a parachute not long ago. Mainwaring is anxious to know whether it was white or cream. Walker cannot remember, as he sold it on his stall as part of eight dozen pairs of ladies' knickers. He, Mainwaring and Wilson now have the unenviable task of trying to find a pair among the citizens of Walmington-on-Sea.

Unsurprisingly, they have no luck, except a young lady who has no hesitation in showing Wilson her blue knickers. The people they have questioned complain to ARP Warden Hodges, who leaves Mainwaring in a tough situation when a pair of knickers emerges from a letterbox.

During a stealth practice the next day, Walker brings in the tracker dog. They test the dog's sniffing power by having Jones pretend to be a Nazi parachutist. They remove Jones' jacket and allow the dog to pick up his scent. As they head up the church hall stairs, Mrs Pike arrives to remind Wilson about their tête-a-tête supper. As the platoon, Jones and the dog come charging down the stairs, they knock down Mrs Pike, revealing her underwear. Walker remembers that he sold the last pair of knickers to Mrs Pike, and they are white: it was a British parachute.

Some time later, Hodges notices a parachute stuck in a tree. He is so busy trying to get it down that he unwittingly gives directions to Downsend Woods for a man with a peculiar German accent. Just as he removes the parachute, the platoon arrive, and after Hodges is mistaken for the parachutist, it is not long before the dog picks up the scent. Hodges tells Mainwaring about the man with the German accent, and they soon spot him.

They follow him to a barn containing a Pekingese dog, a building that was bombed in an air raid the previous year and into a dilapidated old house, where they confront him. However, it turns out he is a Viennese ornithologist, having found a golden oriole bird's egg (which the platoon initially mistakes for a grenade). Mainwaring asks the man why he kept running away. The man explains that since the oriole bird is protected, it is illegal to take its eggs.

Suddenly, the real German parachutist comes barging in, angry that the platoon keeps running away because he has been trying to surrender to them.

== Cast ==
- Arthur Lowe as Captain Mainwaring
- John Le Mesurier as Sergeant Wilson
- Clive Dunn as Lance-Corporal Jones
- John Laurie as Private Frazer
- James Beck as Private Walker
- Arnold Ridley as Private Godfrey
- Ian Lavender as Private Pike
- Bill Pertwee as ARP Warden Hodges
- Janet Davies as Mrs Pike
- Patrick Tull as the Suspect
- Robert Moore as the Large Man
- Leon Cortez as the Small Man
- Olive Mercer as the Fierce Lady
- Miranda Hampton as the Sexy Lady
- Robert Aldous as the German Parachutist
- Bran (the dog) as himself

== Notes ==
- There is some confusion as to the dating of this episode. According to dialogue spoken by Captain Mainwaring at the start, the war has been in progress for eighteen months, which would mean the episode takes place in March 1941. However, further dialogue spoken by Mainwaring just minutes later states that Rudolf Hess had parachuted into Britain six weeks previously (Hess landed in Scotland on 10 May 1941). If this is the case then this episode actually takes place in mid-to-late June 1941, making it 21 months since the war began.

== Radio episode ==
The equivalent radio episode is entitled The Great White Hunter. It was first broadcast on 30 May 1975. The hunt for the parachutist is omitted and there is an additional scene, adapted from another TV episode, Uninvited Guests, in which the platoon trains to use wireless sets using tins and string.
