= The Ordeal of Dr. Shannon =

- Directed by: Joan Kemp-Welch
- Starring: Rod Taylor; Elizabeth MacLennan
- Country of origin: United States

Production
- Running time: 60 min.

Original release
- Network: NBC
- Release: 16 December 1962

The Ordeal of Dr. Shannon is a 1962 American television adaptation from A. J. Cronin's 1948 novel, Shannon's Way. The dramatization was written by Robert Stewart, directed by Joan Kemp-Welch, and produced by Lewis Freedman. The show was the ninth episode of the second season of The DuPont Show of the Week, which was broadcast on NBC, and it starred Rod Taylor and Elizabeth MacLennan. In 1963, it was broadcast in Great Britain on ITV Television Playhouse.

The episode was filmed on location in Britain over two weeks. It was the first co-production between a regular American TV dramatic series and a production company from another country (in this case, England).

== Cast ==
- Rod Taylor as Robert Shannon
- Elizabeth MacLennan as Jean Law
- Alan Casley as the Policeman
- Madeleine Christie as Mrs. Law
- Finlay Currie as Sir Wilfred Challis
- Archie Duncan as Reverend Law
- Hugh Evans as Malcolm Hodden
- Ronald Fraser as Dr. James Mathers
- Betty Henderson as Mrs. Maclaren
- Moultrie Kelsall as Dr. Usher
- Frank Olegario as Chattergee
