= The Lion Has Phones =

- Dad's Army episode
- Episode no.: Series 3 Episode 3
- Directed by: Harold Snoad
- Story by: Jimmy Perry and David Croft
- Original air date: 25 September 1969
- Running time: 30 minutes

Episode chronology
← Previous "Battle School"	Next → "The Bullet is Not for Firing"

"The Lion Has 'Phones" is the third episode of the third series of the British sitcomedy series Dad's Army. It was originally transmitted on 21 September 1969.

== Synopsis ==
Captain Mainwaring teaches the platoon how to use a public telephone box for emergency communication.

== Plot ==
After a successful exercise in camouflage, Mainwaring delivers a lecture on communications. Apparently, the four main targets are the gasometer, the railway bridge, the telephone exchange and the reservoir. They are vital to the town's survival, so two men will be posted at each location. If they see anything suspicious, they will phone Mainwaring via the nearest telephone box. Frazer asks Mainwaring what will happen if the telephone boxes are out of action, and many alternatives are suggested, including a heliograph, tick-tacking, shooting a hole in the top of the gasometer and setting fire to it, and tapping the railway line and laying your ear onto it (Pike dismisses this idea by telling Jones that a train may come and run over your ear).

Pike and Godfrey admit they do not know how to use a telephone box; Mrs Pike believes they are unhygienic and Godfrey is hopeless with machines. After a typically slapstick practical demonstration, the platoon marches down to the telephone box nearest the reservoir. Pike is the first to get the lesson, with Mainwaring telling him to phone the church hall, expecting it to be empty, but Mrs Pike (who just happened to be there with her son's scarf) answers and gives both Mainwaring and Wilson an earful. When a queue begins to form, Walker cons them into believing that telephone calls are going on ration from tomorrow.

That evening, while out on patrol, Frazer and Walker spot a German plane crash into the reservoir. Walker phones Mainwaring, then mysteriously vanishes. Mainwaring and the rest of the platoon arrive, and their verbal attempts to persuade the Germans to surrender result in heavy gunfire. Angered by the Germans' "cheek", Mainwaring writes GHQ's phone number on some paper and tells Jones to go and phone them and to memorise and destroy the paper afterwards. Jones' muddleheadedness results in him saying "Memorise and destroy the phone", reading the phone number upside-down (991 instead of 166) and ringing the Embassy cinema instead, and ends up believing that Googie Withers and Eric Portman are aboard the plane. He gets no joy from emergency services either, so ARP Warden Hodges helps Jones get through.

Eventually, Lieutenant Hope-Bruce of the Coldstream Guards arrives and tells Mainwaring that they've surrounded the reservoir. He pompously tries to get Mainwaring to leave the situation in the hands of the regular army, but is quick to cancel an incautious order for mortar bombs under Mainwaring's persuasion. Walker returns and tells Mainwaring that he's paid the man in charge of the reservoir to open the sluices, and the Germans will have to swim for it in less than two hours. Laughing, Mainwaring says they should leave the mopping up to the Coldstream Guards.

== Cast ==
- Arthur Lowe as Captain Mainwaring
- John Le Mesurier as Sergeant Wilson
- Clive Dunn as Lance Corporal Jones
- John Laurie as Private Frazer
- James Beck as Private Walker
- Arnold Ridley as Private Godfrey
- Ian Lavender as Private Pike
- Janet Davies as Mrs Pike
- Bill Pertwee as ARP Warden Hodges
- Avril Angers as the Telephone Operator
- Timothy Carlton as Lieutenant Hope-Bruce
- Stanley McGeagh as Sergeant Waller
- Pamela Cundell, Olive Mercer and Bernadette Milnes as the Ladies in the Queue
- Gilda Perry as Doreen
- Linda James as Betty
- Richard Jacques as Mr Cheesewright
- Colin Daniel and Carson Green as Boys

== Notes ==
1. The working title for this episode was 'Sorry, Wrong Number', which was the title used for the later radio episode.
2. The episode title is a reference to the 1939 propaganda film The Lion Has Wings.
3. When Jones accidentally rings up the cinema, they mistakenly believe he is enquiring about the 1942 film One of Our Aircraft Is Missing starring, as they tell him, Googie Withers. A poster for this film can be seen on the wall of the box office.
4. The use of the film One of Our Aircraft Is Missing (released in the UK on 27th June 1942) is an anachronism. According to dialogue spoken by the Verger three episodes later in Room at the Bottom (regarding the recent sinking of the German battleship Bismarck), the events of that episode were set on either 27 or 28 May 1941, which means that this episode must be set days before then, making it over a year before the film will be released into cinemas.
5. In this episode, Sgt Wilson says "I have never heard you swear before, sir", while Captain Mainwaring says "bloody cheek". This is untrue, as Wilson has heard Mainwaring say "the rotten bastard" in The Showing Up of Corporal Jones, an episode from Series 1 (1968).
6. When the ladies join the queue for the telephone box, Pamela Cundell's character is referred to as Mrs Fox, the character she played two episodes previously, yet she is still credited as 'Lady in Queue'.
7. In 2020, for the Dad's Army Appreciation Society, Niles Schilder wrote four scripts about how the platoon would have dealt with the events of 2020. In one of the scripts, An Unauthorised Gathering, the platoon learn how to wash their hands in a similar way to how they learnt to use a public telephone box in this episode.
