= Surprise Attack =

Surprise Attack may refer to:

- Surprise attack, an act of military deception
- Surprise Attack (album), a 1989 hard rock album by Tora Tora
- Surprise Attack (film), a 1951 short film
- Surprise Attack (video game), a 1990 game by Konami
- Surprise Attack, a 1985 episode of The Raccoons

== See also ==
- Surprise Attack Records
