= War Dance (Dad's Army) =

- Dad's Army episode
- Episode no.: Series 3 Episode 9
- Directed by: David Croft
- Story by: Jimmy Perry and David Croft
- Original air date: 6 November 1969
- Running time: 30 minutes

Episode chronology
← Previous "The Day the Balloon Went Up"	Next → "Menace from the Deep"

"War Dance" is the ninth episode of the third series of the British comedy series Dad's Army. It was originally transmitted on Thursday 6 November 1969.

== Synopsis ==
The platoon hold a platoon dance, and Pike has a special announcement to make.

== Plot ==
Pike is cleaning Mainwaring's bank office and singing love songs when Mainwaring interrupts him. He changes the subject by telling him how much he is looking forward to the Home Guard dance Mainwaring is organising. When Pike leaves, Mainwaring confides in Wilson that he is not satisfied with Pike's work as of late, and that Pike seems to be constantly distracted. Wilson then mentions that Pike is probably dwelling on the ATS girl he is seeing, a girl by the name of Violet Gibbons. Mainwaring is shocked, as he knew Violet's mother (who used to do housecleaning for him and Mrs. Mainwaring), and when Wilson confirms that she used to work at "a fish and chip shop", he disapprovingly tells Wilson that a girl with "the wrong sort of background" could ruin Pike's whole career at the bank. He asks Wilson to have a word with him, as he is the closest thing to a father Pike has. Wilson tries to wriggle out of it, but Mainwaring goads him by calling him a Peter Pan and reminding him that tongues have been wagging about Frank's parentage (as both Wilson and Mrs. Pike "arrived here about the same time...both from Weston-super-Mare"). Wilson is frustrated but agrees to talk to Pike.

Later, Mainwaring and Jones' section hold a meeting to discuss the final arrangements for the dance. They are in a quandary over music; Jones suggests The Salvation Army, but Walker disagrees, and mentions to Mainwaring that Private Hastings can play the piano, and he will have a word with a band at an RAF unit in Gaulshead. Mainwaring agrees, and announces that his wife will provide sausage rolls.

When preparations are in progress, Wilson continues trying to avoid his intended conversation with Pike, but after being called "Peter Pan" once more by Mainwaring (prompting an exasperated Wilson to reply "My God, Mainwaring, you can hit pretty low when it suits you!"), he finally goes to speak with Pike in the vicar's office. Meanwhile, Jones suggests doing a cabaret act, consisting of his own "humorous monologues and various forms of mimicry", along with a Highland sword dance to be performed by Frazer. Mainwaring says he will mention Jones' idea to the dance committee; shortly afterwards, Frazer enters and tells Jones that he's "gone right off the idea", before limping away with the aid of a cane (with the implication being that he has injured himself while practising the sword dance).

During the conversation with Pike, Wilson awkwardly tries to present himself as a father figure by suggesting they address each other by their first names, and eventually he gets around to the subject of Pike taking Violet to the dance, and tries to gently dissuade him from doing so. Pike then drops the bombshell that he intends to announce their engagement in the middle of the dance, like Jack Oakie and ZaSu Pitts. Wilson's pleas for him to reconsider fall on deaf ears, as do Walker's (who tells Wilson that he used to date Violet previously, but broke it off with her after she started working at the fish and chip shop, as he could not take the lingering smell of fish that she gave off even when they were out on dates).

The initial phase of the dance goes well, apart from a confrontation with Jones and the Verger about the rude word on the harmonium (see The Day the Balloon Went Up). Walker arrives with two twins, Doris and Dora, Godfrey brings along his sister, Cissy, and Frazer brings his niece, Blodwen, who is a Land Girl. Mainwaring turns up with a black eye, and confesses to Jones that the sausage rolls are ruined and Elizabeth would not be coming. At last Jones' partner, Mrs Prosser, arrives and the dance can begin.

However, it is not long before things turn pear-shaped after Pike arrives with Violet. Just as the band take a break, Pike attempts to make his announcement, but Walker manages to prevent it by persuading Jones to do his cabaret act. Jones proceeds to do impressions of actors such as Arthur Askey and George Arliss. At the end of Jones' act, Walker desperately tries to persuade him to impersonate some more actors like Charles Laughton and Freddie Bartholomew; but unfortunately Pike manages to make his way to the microphone, drags a disinterested-looking Violet onto the stage, and announces their engagement. His mother responds to this news by screaming and then fainting.

Later, a drunken Mainwaring stumbles into the vicar's office where Wilson is attempting to sleep, as the both of them have been locked out of their houses (by Elizabeth and Mrs Pike respectively). Pike also comes in, wrapped in a blanket and soaked to the skin. He tells his two superiors that not only was he also locked out, but that his mum threw a bucket of water over him as well ("to cool that ardour", as Wilson puts it). Then, Pike announces that he will not get married after all, much to Wilson's relief. The men then discuss the end of the dance (which had degenerated into a rowdy drunken brawl at the end), agreeing that overall it was still a "good dance".

== Cast ==
- Arthur Lowe as Captain Mainwaring
- John Le Mesurier as Sergeant Wilson
- Clive Dunn as Lance Corporal Jones
- John Laurie as Private Frazer
- James Beck as Private Walker
- Arnold Ridley as Private Godfrey
- Ian Lavender as Private Pike
- Edward Sinclair as The Verger
- Frank Williams as The Vicar
- Janet Davies as Mrs Pike
- Nan Braunton as Cissy Godfrey
- Olive Mercer as Mrs Yeatman
- Sally Douglas as Blodwen
- Jenny Thomas as Violet Gibbons
- Dora Graham as Dora
- Doris Graham as Doris
- Hugh Hastings as Private Hastings, the Pianist
- Eleanor Smale as Mrs Prosser
