= The Day the Balloon Went Up =

- Dad's Army episode
- Episode no.: Series 3 Episode 8
- Directed by: David Croft
- Story by: Jimmy Perry and David Croft
- Original air date: 30 October 1969
- Running time: 30 minutes

Episode chronology
| ← Previous "Big Guns" | Next → "War Dance" |

"The Day the Balloon Went Up" is the eighth episode of the third series of the British comedy series Dad's Army that was originally transmitted on Thursday 30 October 1969.

== Synopsis ==
A runaway barrage balloon has to be brought down to earth – along with Captain Mainwaring.

== Plot ==
The platoon are parading out in the yard. Mainwaring is appalled by the lack of attention taken in their appearance: Jones is standing with his legs apart, Walker has his pockets stuffed with sugar and sultanas and Godfrey is wearing his cap "like George Formby", a slipper and carrying a walking stick. Mainwaring mentions that he received a message from his Commanding Officer the other day: he came through and did not receive a single salute, and Jones had his hands plunged into his trouser pockets. Jones admits that it was because he forgot his braces and did not want to cause any embarrassment.

Mainwaring decides to dedicate the rest of the parade to practising saluting. However, the Vicar disrupts the practice and informs Mainwaring of some illicit graffiti on the back of his spare harmonium. Mainwaring's men sleep in the tower room when on fire watch, so they are the prime suspects. Mainwaring instantly denies this, so he and Wilson decide to go up to the tower room to see for themselves. When Mainwaring and the Vicar reach the top, Mainwaring decides to bring up Jones' section to compare the handwriting. An exhausted Wilson has only just reached the top before he is asked to go down again and bring up Jones' section.

Leaving Wilson at the bottom of the stairs, each man writes the same word next to the graffiti, much to the Vicar's annoyance. Suddenly, Jones notices something: the Verger passes the window hanging on the cable of a barrage balloon. They all rush downstairs, just as Wilson reaches the top. Before they can pull it down, they notice that its rope is caught around the church tower, so Mainwaring tells Wilson (who has just come down again) to run up to the top and get it free. Since Wilson is too tired, they simply pull it free and manage to get the Verger and the balloon down safely, but they are left hanging onto the ropes for dear life. ARP Warden Hodges arrives and tries to take charge of the situation. He and Mainwaring phone the RAF, but they will not be available until nightfall, leaving the platoon with a dilemma.

It is Walker who suggests taking the balloon to Pinner Woods and tying it to a tree. Jones decides to take his van to prevent it being carried away by the wind. They find a fallen tree just outside the woods. Unfortunately, while Mainwaring is securing one of the ropes, Jones and the platoon release their ropes too soon, and the balloon floats away, taking Mainwaring with it. The platoon, Vicar and the Verger follow it in the van, while Hodges, after his motorbike fails to start, borrows a tricycle from Mr Blewitt, and later, a tandem from a young couple. Jones suggests shooting holes in the balloon to make it descend, but Walker and the others fail to hit it. Meanwhile, the RAF have also spotted the balloon, as well as Mainwaring, whom an air patrol identify as "a little fat round thing" on the end of the rope. Mainwaring gets entangled in haystacks, topiaries and washing lines before the balloon finally comes to rest on a railway bridge. Walker notices a train coming, so they quickly drag Mainwaring and the balloon off the bridge, and Mainwaring collapses as the platoon secure the balloon.

Unfortunately, when an RAF Squadron Leader turns up, Jones orders the platoon to salute, thus releasing the balloon, and starting the chase all over again.

== Cast ==
- Arthur Lowe as Captain Mainwaring
- John Le Mesurier as Sergeant Wilson
- Clive Dunn as Lance Corporal Jones
- John Laurie as Private Frazer
- James Beck as Private Walker
- Arnold Ridley as Private Godfrey
- Ian Lavender as Private Pike
- Bill Pertwee as ARP Warden Hodges
- Frank Williams as The Vicar
- Edward Sinclair as The Verger
- Nan Braunton as Cissy Godfrey
- Jennifer Browne as W.A.A.F. Sergeant
- Andrew Carr as Operations Room Officer
- Thérèse McMurray as Girl in the Haystack
- Kenneth Watson as the RAF squadron leader
- Vicki Lane as Girl on the Tandem
- Harold Bennett as Mr Blewitt
- Jack Haig as Gardener

== Notes ==
The brief clip of the train approaching the railway bridge was taken from The Titfield Thunderbolt. The railway location used was Wendling railway station, which had also been used on Battle School.
