= Finlay Currie =

Scottish actor (1878–1968)

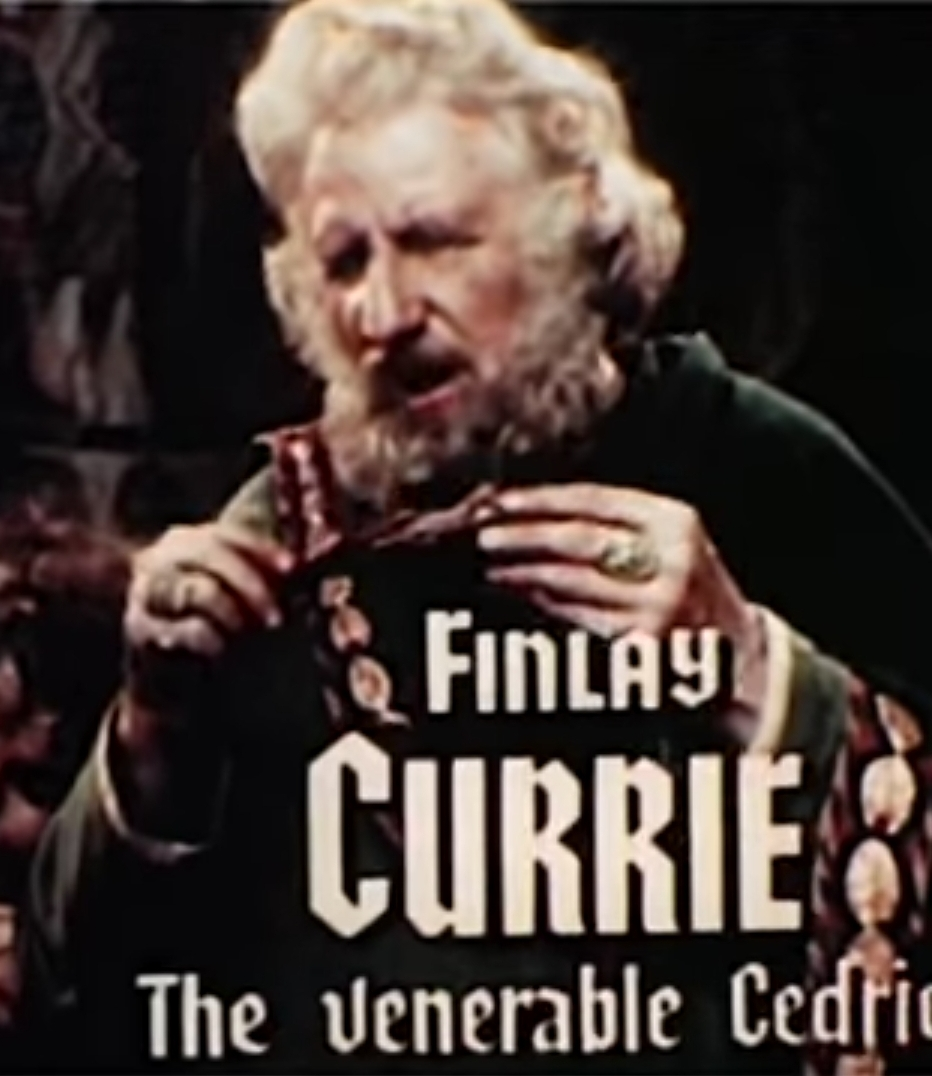
- Trailer for Ivanhoe (1952)
- Born: William Finlay Currie; 20 January 1878; Edinburgh, Midlothian, Scotland
- Died: 9 May 1968 (aged 90); Gerrards Cross, Buckinghamshire, England
- Resting place: Breakspear Crematorium, Ruislip, London, England
- Occupation: Actor
- Years active: 1898–1968
- Spouse: Maude Courtney (m. 1905; died 1959)
- Children: 2

William Finlay Currie (20 January 1878 – 9 May 1968) was a Scottish actor of stage, screen, and television. He received great acclaim for his roles as Abel Magwitch in the British film Great Expectations (1946), as Saint Peter in Quo Vadis (1951) and as Balthazar in the American film Ben-Hur (1959).

In his career spanning 70 years, Currie appeared in seven films nominated for the Academy Award for Best Picture, of which Around the World in 80 Days (1956) and Ben-Hur were winners.

== Career ==
Currie was born in Edinburgh, Scotland. He attended George Watson's College and worked as organist and choir director. In 1898 he got his first job in Benjamin Fuller's theatre group, and appeared with them for almost 10 years.

After emigrating to the United States in the late 1890s, Currie and his wife, Maude Courtney, did a song-and-dance act on the stage. He made his first film, The Old Man, in 1931. He appeared as a priest in the 1943 Ealing Second World War film Undercover (1943). His most famous film role was the convict, Abel Magwitch, in David Lean's Great Expectations (1946). He also earned praise for his portrayal of Queen Victoria's highland attendant John Brown in The Mudlark (1950).

In the following years Currie appeared in Hollywood film epics, including such roles as Saint Peter in Quo Vadis (1951), as Balthazar, one of the Three Magi, in the multi-Oscar-winning Ben-Hur (1959); the Pope in Francis of Assisi (1961); and an aged, wise senator in The Fall of the Roman Empire (1964). He appeared in People Will Talk with Cary Grant and portrayed Robert Taylor's embittered father Sir Cedric in MGM's Technicolor version of Ivanhoe (1952). Ivanhoe highlighted his comic capabilities, as well as a willingness to continue to do action scenes in his 70s.

Currie's television roles included Sir Gideon Murray in Alexander Reid's The Lass wi' the Muckle Mou, broadcast by the BBC on 6 October 1953. In 1962, he starred in an episode of NBC's The DuPont Show of the Week, The Ordeal of Dr. Shannon, an adaptation of A.J. Cronin's novel, Shannon's Way.

Currie was the subject of This Is Your Life in February 1963 when he was surprised by Eamonn Andrews at the BBC Television Theatre in London.

In 1966, Currie played Mr. Lundie, the minister, in the television adaptation of the musical Brigadoon. His last performance was for the television series The Saint, which starred Roger Moore. Currie played a dying mafioso boss in the two-part episode "Vendetta for the Saint", which was shown posthumously in 1969.

== Personal life and death ==
Currie was married to American actress Maude Courtney. They had two children, George and Marion.

Late in life, Currie became a much respected antiques dealer, specialising in coins and precious metals. He was also a longtime collector of the works of Robert Burns.

Currie died on 9 May 1968 in Gerrards Cross, Buckinghamshire, at age 90. His ashes were scattered in Breakspear Crematorium, Ruislip, Middlesex.

== Complete filmography ==
- The Old Man (1931) as Rennett
- The Frightened Lady (1932) as Brooks
- Rome Express (1932) as Sam (publicist)
- The Good Companions (1933) as Monte Mortimer
- Excess Baggage (1933) as Inspector Toucan
- It's a Boy (1933) (uncredited)
- Princess Charming (1934) as Baron Seegman
- Orders Is Orders (1934) as Dave
- Little Friend (1934) as Grove
- Gay Love (1934) as Highams
- My Old Dutch (1934) as Mo
- Mr. Cinders (1934) as Henry Kemp
- The Big Splash (1935) as Hartley Bassett
- In Town Tonight (1935) as The Manager
- Heat Wave (1935) as Captain (uncredited)
- The Improper Duchess (1936) as Milton Lee
- The Gay Adventure (1936) as Porter
- Wanted! (1937) as Uncle Mart
- Glamorous Night (1937) as Angus MacIntosh
- Catch as Catch Can (1937) as Al Parsons
- The Edge of the World (1937) as James Gray
- Command Performance (1937) as Al, Arthur's Manager
- Paradise for Two (1937) as Creditor (uncredited)
- The Claydon Treasure Mystery (1938) as Rubin
- Follow Your Star (1938) as Maxie
- Around the Town (1938) as Sam Wyngold
- The Royal Family of Broadway (1939, TV movie) as Oscar Wolfe
- Leviathan (1939, TV movie)
- Sun Up (1939, TV movie) as Pap Todd
- The Great Adventure (1939 TV Movie) as Texel
- One Night, One Day... (1939, TV Movie) as James
- Crook's Tour (1941) as Tourist on Desert Bus (uncredited)
- 49th Parallel (1941) as The Factor
- The Day Will Dawn (1942) as Capt. Alstad
- Thunder Rock (1942) as Capt. Joshua Stuart
- The Bells Go Down (1943) as District Officer MacFarlane
- Warn That Man (1943) as Captain Andrew Fletcher
- Theatre Royal (1943) as Clement J. Earle
- Undercover (1943) as Father (uncredited)
- They Met in the Dark (1943) as Merchant Captain
- The Shipbuilders (1943) as McWain
- Don Chicago (1945) as Bugs Mulligan
- I Know Where I'm Going! (1945) as Ruairidh Mhór
- The Trojan Brothers (1946) as W. H. Maxwell
- School for Secrets (1946) as Sir Duncan Wills
- In the Zone (1946, TV Movie) as Scotty
- Spring Song (1946) as Cobb
- Great Expectations (1946) as Magwitch
- Musical Chairs (1947, TV Movie) as Samuel Plagett
- Woman to Woman as Theatre Manager
- You Can't Take It with You (1947, TV Movie) as Martin Vanderhof
- The Brothers (1947) as Hector Macrae
- The Great Adventure (1947, TV Movie) as Texel
- So Evil My Love (1948) as Dr Krylie
- My Brother Jonathan (1948) as Dr Hammond
- Mr. Perrin and Mr. Traill (1948) as Sir Joshua Varley
- Sleeping Car to Trieste (1948) as Alastair MacBain
- Bonnie Prince Charlie (1948) as the Marquis of Tullibardine
- The History of Mr. Polly (1949) as Uncle Jim
- Edward, My Son (1949) as Sir Lawrence Smythe (uncredited)
- Whisky Galore! (1949) as Narrator (uncredited)
- Treasure Island (1950) as Captain Billy Bones
- Trio (1950) as Mr McLeod (in segment Sanatorium)
- My Daughter Joy (1950) as Sir Thomas McTavish
- The Black Rose (1950) as Alfgar
- The Mudlark (1950) as John Brown
- People Will Talk (1951) as Shunderson
- Quo Vadis (1951) as Saint Peter
- Walk East on Beacon (1952) as Professor Albert Kafer
- Kangaroo (1952) as Michael McGuire
- Ivanhoe (1952) as Cedric
- Stars and Stripes Forever (1952) as Colonel Randolph
- Treasure of the Golden Condor (1953) as MacDougal
- The Broken Jug (1953, TV Movie) as Inspector Walter
- The Lass Wi' the Muckle Mou (1953, TV Movie) as Sir Gideon Murray
- Rob Roy: The Highland Rogue (1953) as Hamish MacPherson
- The End of the Road (1954) as Old "Mick-Mack"
- Beau Brummell (1954) as McIver, Brummel's Publisher (uncredited)
- Third Party Risk (1954) as Mr. Darius
- Captain Lightfoot (1955) as Callahan
- Make Me an Offer (1955) as Abe Sparta
- Thunder Rock (1955, TV Movie) as Capt. Joshua Stuart
- Footsteps in the Fog (1955) as Inspector Peters
- King's Rhapsody (1955) as King Paul
- Around the World in 80 Days (1956) as Andrew Stuart, Reform Club member
- Zarak (1957) as the Mullah
- Seven Waves Away (1957) as Mr Wheaton
- The Little Hut (1957) as the Reverend Bertram Brittingham-Bell
- Saint Joan (1957) as Archbishop of Rheims
- Campbell's Kingdom (1957) as Old Man
- Dangerous Exile (1957) as Mr. Patient
- The Naked Earth (1958) as Father Verity
- Tempest (1958) as Count Grinov
- 6.5 Special (1958) as Himself
- Corridors of Blood (1958) as Supt Matheson
- Solomon and Sheba (1959) as King David
- Ben-Hur (1959) as Balthasar / Narrator
- Hand in Hand (1960) as Mr Pritchard
- Kidnapped (1960) as Cluny MacPherson
- The Angel Wore Red (1960) as Bishop
- The Adventures of Huckleberry Finn (1960) as Capt. Sellers
- Clue of the Silver Key (1961) as Harvey Lane
- Edgar Wallace Mysteries – "Clue of the Silver Key" (1961; US TV: The Edgar Wallace Mystery Theatre) as Harvey Lane
- Five Golden Hours (1961) as Father Superior
- Francis of Assisi (1961) as the Pope
- Joseph and His Brethren (1961) as Jacob
- Go to Blazes (1962) as the Judge
- The Inspector (1962) as De Kool
- The Amorous Prawn (1962) as Lochaye
- Cleopatra (1963) as Titus (uncredited)
- Murder at the Gallop (1963) as Old Enderby
- The Cracksman (1963) as Feathers
- Billy Liar (1963) as Duxbury
- West 11 (1963) as Mister Cash
- The Three Lives of Thomasina (1964) as Grandpa Stirling
- The Fall of the Roman Empire (1964) as Senator
- Who Was Maddox? (1964) as Alec Campbell
- The Battle of the Villa Fiorita (1965) as Emcee
- Bunny Lake Is Missing (1965) as Dollmaker
- Brigadoon (1966, TV Movie) as Mr Lundie
- Alice in Wonderland (1966, TV Movie) as Dodo
- Vendetta for the Saint (1969) as Don Pasquale

== Partial television credits ==
- The Lass wi' the Muckle Mou (1953) as Sir Gideon Murray
- Danger Man – Episodes: "The Gallows Tree" (1961) as Jock "That's Two of Us Sorry" (1965) as Jock (NOTE: apparently both times he appeared in that series, his character was named "Jock"!
- Dixon of Dock Green Episode "A Home of One's Own" (1962) as Mr Caldicott
- Alice in Wonderland (1966) as the Dodo
- Gideon's Way Episode "The Thin Red Line" (1966) as the General
- The Prisoner – Episode "The Chimes of Big Ben" (1967) as General
- The Saint – Episode "Vendetta for the Saint" (1968) as Don Pasquale (final television appearance)
