= The Bullet Is Not for Firing =

- Dad's Army episode
- Episode no.: Series 3 Episode 4
- Directed by: David Croft
- Story by: Jimmy Perry and David Croft
- Original air date: 2 October 1969
- Running time: 30 minutes

Episode chronology
← Previous "The Lion Has Phones"	Next → "Something Nasty in the Vault"

"The Bullet Is Not for Firing" is the fourth episode of the third series of the British comedy series Dad's Army. It was originally transmitted on Thursday 2 October 1969.

== Synopsis ==
When the platoon engage a low flying German plane with rapid fire, a Court of Inquiry is held.

== Plot ==
As the "all clear" air raid siren sounds, Mainwaring and Wilson wake up from a nap, but both are quick to deny it. As they go into the hall and begin to make some tea, Mainwaring remarks on a low-flying Nazi plane that passed over Walmington. The platoon arrives and Mainwaring asks them to hand in their ammunition, but Jones admits they have not got any: they wasted it all shooting at the low-flying plane. Godfrey is the only one with a full magazine, because by the time he had got it out of his overcoat, the plane had flown away. Mainwaring decides to report the night's events to GHQ. As the tired platoon prepare to make a cup of tea, Mainwaring bursts their bubble by saying their rifles have to be pulled through and boiled out.

Mainwaring decides to organise a thorough search around the area to find the missing cartridges. As they leave to supervise the rifle maintenance, Jones is having trouble removing his pull-through, and several methods are tried, including tying it to the banister and pulling it out. However, this destroys the banister, much to the Verger's chagrin. When Mainwaring ties it to a thicker pillar, the string breaks and it becomes impossible to remove. However, the problem is soon solved when Mrs Pike arrives to take Frank home, and pulls the string out from the other end of the rifle.

Later, the empty cartridges are collected. Mainwaring explains that GHQ has decided to hold a Court of Inquiry to find out what really happened. Wilson is sceptical, but Mainwaring reminds him that honesty is the best policy. The two officers overseeing the inquiry, Captain Cutts and Captain Pringle, discuss the inquiry as they travel to Walmington-on-Sea by train (revealing that it was in fact Mainwaring who demanded the inquiry, having gone "all regimental" on the phone when asked why the platoon needed more ammunition). Both officers agree to try and get it over and done with as soon as possible, as they have dates for later in the evening (Cutts says he's going to a show with a "WREN", while Pringle has a dinner date with a "FANY").

At the church hall, the platoon is busy preparing for the inquiry. Jones arrives in his old "red coat" uniform that he wore under Lord Kitchener, and Frazer brings in a sword that he owned back in the Navy, as it was standard procedure for swords to be laid on the table during inquiries. Mainwaring finds this unnecessary, however. Just before Cutts and Pringle arrive, Pike enters with a box of ammunition from HQ, and Mainwaring quickly hands it out to the men. Jones lines the witnesses up outside, and they prepare to begin the Court of Inquiry. However, they are twice interrupted by members of a choir who have come for the Vicar's practice. The choir then start singing loudly in the office, and a frustrated Mainwaring goes to confront the vicar. Through the course of the inquiry, it is revealed that Jones gave the order to fire.

Suddenly, thunder crashes, and the platoon rush in, not wanting to be soaked. Cutts and Pringle, who are becoming quite irritated, decide that the platoon should demonstrate what happened. Jones states that as soon as he spotted the plane, he gave the order "shoot". Mainwaring corrects him by saying "fire", but the platoon follow his command and shoot the ceiling, bringing it down on top of them. Having had enough of all these dilemmas, Mainwaring suggests they meet "same time, same place, next week".

== Cast ==
- Arthur Lowe as Captain Mainwaring
- John Le Mesurier as Sergeant Wilson
- Clive Dunn as Lance Corporal Jones
- John Laurie as Private Frazer
- James Beck as Private Walker
- Arnold Ridley as Private Godfrey
- Ian Lavender as Private Pike
- Janet Davies as Mrs Pike
- Frank Williams as The Vicar
- Edward Sinclair as The Verger
- Harold Bennett as Mr Blewitt
- May Warden as Mrs Dowding
- Michael Knowles as Captain Cutts
- Tim Barrett as Captain Pringle
- Fred Tomlinson as Choir member
- Kate Forge as Choir member
- Eilidh McNab as Choir member
- Andrew Daye as Choir member
- Arthur Lewis as Choir member

== Notes ==
1. This episode was the first to feature Edward Sinclair as the Verger. He had previously appeared in "The Showing Up of Corporal Jones", but was credited and referred to as the caretaker and had not donned his trademark black cassock and yellow duster.
2. This episode features the only reference to the Axis's anti-Judaism in the entire show, when Walker says of the German aircraft, "He loosed off his machine gun at Marks & Spencers. A Jewish firm, you know."
3. Mainwaring says the ammunition is "point three-oh-oh" calibre, indicating that the platoon's rifles are the American-made M1917 Enfield rather than the similar looking Pattern 1914 Enfield, which was in .303 British calibre. However, the rifles are not painted with a red stripe as was the case for real M1917s in British service.
4. In opening the Inquiry, Mainwaring says 75 rounds were lost, which would be correct if the 15 men had fired five rounds each. However, it should only be 70 rounds, since Godfrey did not fire and said he still had his rounds.
