= Something Nasty in the Vault =

- Dad's Army episode
- Episode no.: Series 3 Episode 5
- Directed by: David Croft
- Story by: Jimmy Perry and David Croft
- Original air date: 9 October 1969
- Running time: 30 minutes

Episode chronology
← Previous "The Bullet is Not for Firing"	Next → "Room at the Bottom"

"Something Nasty in the Vault" is the fifth episode of the third series of the British comedy series Dad's Army. It was originally transmitted on Thursday 9 October 1969.

== Synopsis ==
Captain Mainwaring and Sergeant Wilson find themselves trapped in the bank vault with an unexploded bomb.

== Plot ==
Walker arrives to pay some money into the bank, and a rather posh looking gentleman is standing behind him. As Pike prepares to cash his money, he discovers one of Walker's £5 notes is a forgery. Mainwaring is shocked to learn that the money came from him, and decides to hush it up. As Walker leaves, the posh gentleman introduces himself as Mr West, a Bank Inspector. Mainwaring's face falls.

He takes him into the office, where West tells him that his monthly report to Head Office has become irregular. Mainwaring blames it on his Home Guard duties. West is shocked to see a Lewis gun perched on the windowsill, and berates Mainwaring for putting the bank in danger. Mainwaring points out that the Lewis gun covers the High Street from Stead and Simpson's to Timothy Whites (referring to chain stores of the period). Suddenly, the air raid siren sounds and their meeting is cut short.

West is less than pleased when they return two hours later, complaining that it could have been one of their planes they heard. Suddenly, he notices a hole in the roof, and flies into a fit of rage, believing that while they were in the Anderson shelter, someone broke into the bank. As he picks up loose notes, both Mainwaring and Wilson vanish. West searches for them, and is shocked to see a massive hole in the floor, where Mainwaring and Wilson are stranded, clutching an unexploded bomb on their laps. West rushes off to get help, bumping into Jones, who quickly takes charge and puts the bank under martial law. He rushes off to get the rest of the platoon and ring the Bomb Disposal Unit, while Pike and ARP Warden Hodges dither about in the office.

Eventually, Jones returns with the platoon, but Mainwaring orders him to get them all out, as he feels there is no point in the platoon risking their lives as well. Initially, Walker agrees with the idea, only to be upbraided for it by an outraged Jones. Jones then asks the rest of the platoon if they want to leave as well, which all the men refuse to do (Godfrey reminds the platoon that Mainwaring would not leave any of them if they were in the same situation; while Pike adds that he could not leave his "Uncle Arthur", as his mother would not like it if he did). Walker then tells Jones that he is not going to leave either. Shortly afterwards, Hodges returns and has a brief argument with Jones as to who is in charge of the situation; this is quickly resolved when Captain Rogers of the Bomb Disposal Unit arrives and takes charge. Unfortunately, both the keys to the strongroom are still in Mainwaring and Wilson's possession, so Frazer uses a fishing rod to yank up one of the keys. Rogers enters the strongroom, and identifies the bomb's fuse as a 'trembler'. He exasperates Mainwaring and Wilson by saying he has to go back to GHQ to pick up some special equipment. After Rogers leaves, Jones and Godfrey bring Mainwaring and Wilson each a cup of coffee, with Godfrey helping them to drink it.

Jones realises that Mainwaring and Wilson cannot hang on much longer, so he proposes an elaborate plan to remove the bomb from them. He and the others build a makeshift pulley in the office and tie the bomb to a piece of rope to pull it up, but in the process, it takes Jones with it.

Later, they all have a drink in the pub, and West congratulates the platoon for saving the bank. Mrs Pike rushes in and offers her compliments to Mainwaring and Wilson. West offers to pay for the drinks, but the note he uses is a dud, so Walker pays it with some money he nabbed from the bank.

== Cast ==
- Arthur Lowe as Captain Mainwaring
- John Le Mesurier as Sergeant Wilson
- Clive Dunn as Lance Corporal Jones
- John Laurie as Private Frazer
- James Beck as Private Walker
- Arnold Ridley as Private Godfrey
- Ian Lavender as Private Pike
- Bill Pertwee as ARP Warden Hodges
- Janet Davies as Mrs Pike
- Robert Dorning as Mr West, the Bank Inspector
- Norman Mitchell as Captain Rogers

== Notes ==
1. This episode was originally titled "Don't Let Go".
2. According to a cut scene (reinstated in the radio adaptation), this episode is set exactly one year after "The Man and the Hour", placing it on 14 May 1941.
3. Jones slips up at one point when he refers to Captain Rogers as Major Rogers, although he is clearly wearing the three pips of a captain.
4. Captain Rogers identifies the bomb as an SC50.
5. Mr West, who appears here played by Robert Dorning, would later appear in the Series 4 episode A. Wilson (Manager)? played by Blake Butler.
6. As the staff return from the air raid Mr West tries to hang his hat on the hat stand but it falls down the back.

== Radio episode ==
In addition to John Snagge's regular role as announcer and newsreader, John Barron featured as Mr West, Frank Thornton as Captain Rogers, and Elizabeth Morgan as Janet King.

Rather than Walker's dud £5 note, Mr West is simply made to wait outside Mainwaring's office. The scene with the platoon refusing to leave was omitted, together with the characters of Privates Godfrey and Walker, and the episode ends with Wilson telling Mainwaring and Jones they should get the hell out of there, the visual gag of Jones getting caught up with the bomb and the pub scene being omitted.
