= Moultrie Kelsall =

British actor (1901–1980)

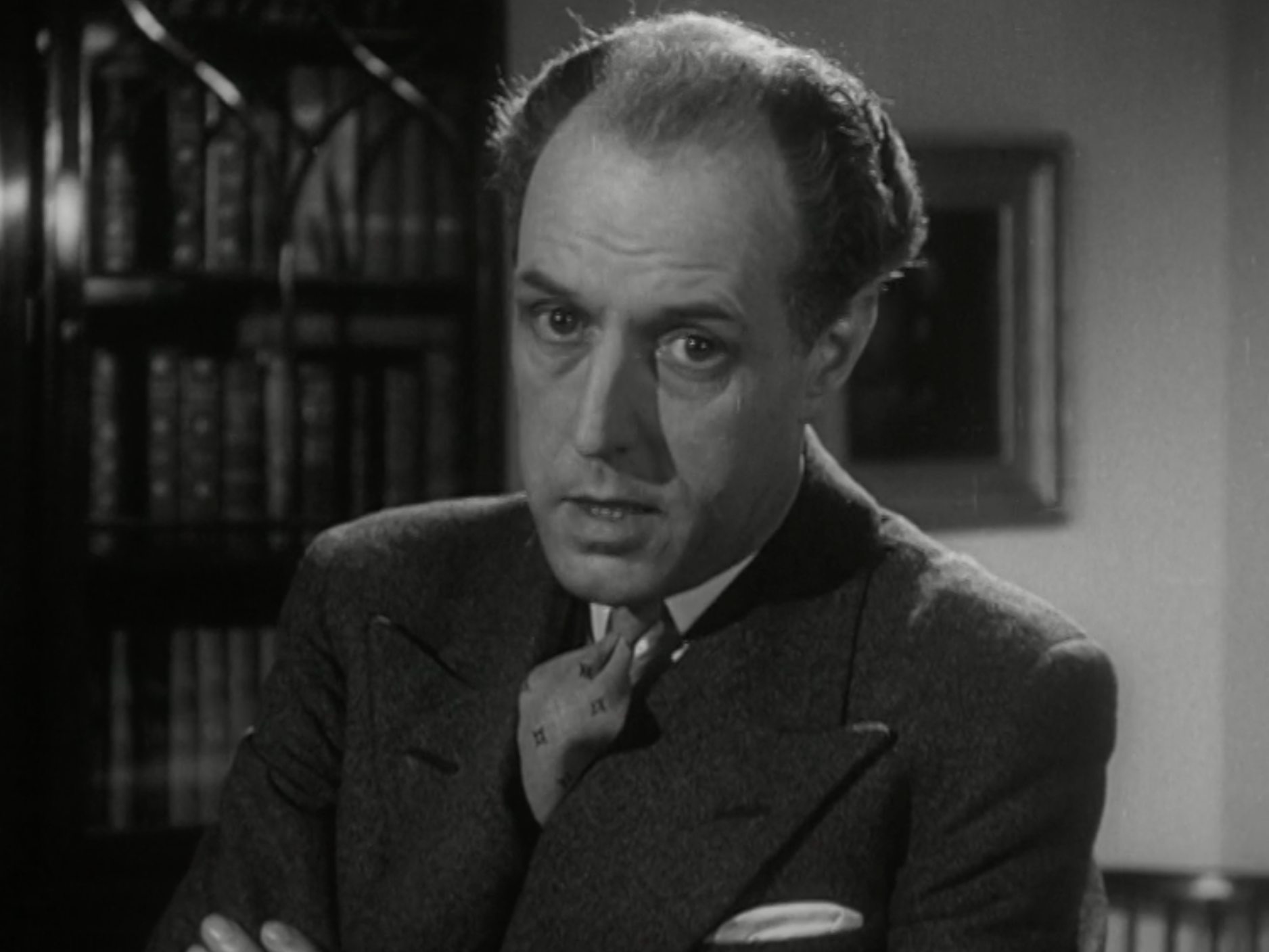
- in Surprise Attack (1951)
- Born: Moultrie Rowe Kelsall; 24 October 1904; Bearsden, East Dunbartonshire, Scotland
- Died: 13 February 1980 (aged 75); Blairlogie, Stirling, Scotland
- Other name: Moultrie R. Kelsall
- Education: Glasgow University
- Occupation: Actor
- Years active: 1949–1980
- Spouse: Ruby Duncan

Moultrie Rowe Kelsall (24 October 1904 – 13 February 1980) was a Scottish film and television character actor, who began his career in the industry as a radio director and television producer. He also contributed towards architectural conservation.

== Life and career ==
=== Early ===
A native of Bearsden, East Dunbartonshire, Kelsall studied at Glasgow University and began acting with the Scottish National Players before developing his acting career at the Westminster Theatre in London. Towards the end of 1931 he accepted an offer to take over the running of the BBC's Aberdeen radio station 2BD, which had become moribund, and re-invigorated it, putting on-air some of the best programmes in Scottish broadcasting, according to the BBC's then Scottish Regional Director, Melville Dinwiddie.

In 1937 he was transferred to the new BBC television service at Alexandra Palace, adapting a J. M. Barrie one act play, "The Old Lady Shows Her Medals", for release in December of that year. In all, Kelsall produced 19 shows for BBC television, ending in 1939 with The Happy Hangman, a play by Harold Brighouse. From 1943, he also adapted novels and plays for broadcast on BBC Radio's long-running drama strand Saturday Night Theatre.

=== Film and television ===
His acting career began in a 1949 film called Landfall, which starred Michael Denison, and recounts the story of a pilot [Denison] who sinks a German U-boat, but which is believed by other officers to be a Royal Navy vessel. (The pilot is vindicated in the end of course !). Kelsall played Lieutenant James, the commander of a coastal defence vessel.

In 1951, a busy year for him, he moved up the cast list to play another lieutenant (Crystal) in the film Captain Horatio Hornblower R.N., which featured Gregory Peck and Virginia Mayo as a Royal Naval captain and a titled Lady who become romantically involved whilst at sea in Central America in 1807. The film was adapted by Ivan Goff and Ben Roberts from the Hornblower book "Beat To Quarters" by C. S. Forester. In the same year, he appeared as the Constable of France in the BBC TV "Sunday Night Theatre" production of Shakespeare's Henry V, and played the role of the medical officer of health in the short film Surprise Attack, produced by the Crown Film Unit and commissioned by the Ministry of Health. That year he also played a Detective Superintendent in the Ealing Studios comedy film, The Lavender Hill Mob, directed by Charles Crichton, and starring Alec Guinness and Stanley Holloway. Audrey Hepburn had a very small part, indeed it may have been her debut. He completed his year's work as a ship's captain in the espionage film, High Treason, co-written and directed by Roy Boulting.

Kelsall then made an appearance as "MacCauley" in Errol Flynn's 1953 Scottish swashbuckler, The Master of Ballantrae, and, in the same year, played Commander Dawson in the wartime POW movie, Albert R.N., about the use of a dummy to disguise the escape of a prisoner. From then until 1956, he made seven more films, before switching to television once more, appearing in "The Quarrel", episode 2 of the six-part BBC adaptation of Robert Louis Stevenson's Kidnapped, which starred Patrick Troughton, and in which Kelsall played Cluny Macpherson (he would also go on to play a more prominent character, Prestongrange, in four of eleven episodes of the re-make of the same series by BBC television in 1963).

Kelsall took time out in 1956 to write, adapting for TV a Marie Fawcett story, Mister Betts Runs Away, in the ATV series "Lilli Palmer Theatre". He later did the same (in 1968 for Scottish Television) with D. K. Broster's The Flight of the Heron.

In 1957, he continued on the small screen for the BBC, taking the role of Regan in one episode ("No Place Like Home") of the popular television series Dixon of Dock Green, which starred Jack Warner as the London 'bobby', George Dixon. Returning to the cinema in the same year, The Barretts of Wimpole Street saw him play Dr. Ford-Waterlow, with Edward and Elizabeth Barrett portrayed by John Gielgud and Jennifer Jones.

He was Dr. Robinson in the 1958 film The Inn of the Sixth Happiness, featuring Robert Donat and Ingrid Bergman, and then appeared regularly on television and in film throughout 1959, culminating with his part as Graham in the movie The Battle of the Sexes opposite Peter Sellers.

In 1961, the Children's Film Foundation made a low-budget film called The Last Rhino, about a child who has to defend a wounded rhino against his uncle (the game warden) and the local Kenyan tribesmen. Before its release, this film was entirely voiced over by different actors to those who appeared in it, and Kelsall provided the audio presence for the district commissioner, who had been visually played by Tony Blane. Maurice Denham voiced the game warden.

Kelsall was a member of the board of the Edinburgh Gateway Company from 1953 and served as chairman from 1960 to 1965. During the 1960s, aside from his acting career, he was well known in Edinburgh as the man who ran the popular "Laigh Coffee House" in Hanover Street.

Between 1961 and 1969, Kelsall switched mainly to the medium of television, securing roles in various BBC anthology-style series, such as Suspense and Out of the Unknown, and other more mainstream sixties productions, including appearances in The Saint and Dr. Finlay's Casebook. In 1962, he appeared in an episode of The DuPont Show of the Week (NBC) entitled The Ordeal of Dr. Shannon, an adaptation of A. J. Cronin's novel, Shannon's Way. Kelsall took the part of boarding house owner Petey Bowles in the 1968 film version of Harold Pinter's The Birthday Party, which starred Robert Shaw.

In 1970, he took the lead role as Andrew Flaxton in all 13 episodes of season 2 of The Flaxton Boys, a Yorkshire Television children's series set at Flaxton Hall in 1890.

His last film was the 1970 Sammy Davis Jr., comedy sequel, One More Time, in which Davis and Peter Lawford play swinging U.S. private investigators Salt and Pepper, investigating the murder in England of the titled twin brother of Chris Pepper (Lawford). Kelsall played a church minister.

Kelsall continued to work until the year of his death in 1980. His appearances included such programmes as The Persuaders!, Doomwatch, Coronation Street, and the BBC epic Edward the Seventh, in which he played Sir James Clark. From 1973 to 1976, he portrayed Sheriff Derwent in 7 episodes of the BBC Scottish drama series Sutherland's Law, about a Procurator Fiscal, played by Iain Cuthbertson.

After appearing as Tradul in 1977 in a BBC television adaptation of Rosemary Sutcliff's Roman saga, The Eagle of the Ninth (starring Patrick Malahide), Kelsall went into semi-retirement. He made one final contribution to television, taking the part of Sir Archie in BBC TV's adaptation of the Henrik Ibsen novel, Enemy of the People, which featured Robert Urquhart, and which was broadcast ten days before Moultrie Kelsall died on 13 February 1980.

=== Life outside showbusiness ===
Kelsall was well known for his work in the field of conservation, a leading example being his salvation and restoration of Menstrie Castle in Clackmannanshire, Scotland, between 1951 and 1964. Menstrie Castle's own website pays tribute when it states "the building was so badly dilapidated that it was only saved from demolition after a campaign led by the actor". Kelsall also restored buildings including a derelict cottage in Ayrshire and one in Blairlogie, near Menstrie, which he lived in. In 1961, he co-authored a book with architect Stuart Harris entitled A Future for the Past, which argued for the restoration of old buildings. Kelsall also established and ran the legendary Laigh coffee house and bakery in Hanover Street, Edinburgh. He was married to Ruby Duncan, a musician.

== Selected filmography ==
- Landfall (1949) - Lt. 'Mouldy' James (uncredited)
- Last Holiday (1950) - Sir Robert Kyle
- The Franchise Affair (1951) - Judge
- Captain Horatio Hornblower R.N. (1951) - Lt. Crystal
- The Lavender Hill Mob (1951) - Detective Superintendent
- High Treason (1951) - Ships Captain (uncredited)
- You're Only Young Twice (1952) - Scottish Announcer (uncredited)
- 24 Hours of a Woman's Life (1952) - Murdoch
- The Hour of 13 (1952) - Magistrate of Court
- Johnny on the Run (1953) - Mr. MacIntyre
- The Master of Ballantrae (1953) - MacCauley (uncredited)
- Albert R.N. (1953) - Henry
- The Maggie (1954) - C.S.S. Skipper
- Trouble in the Glen (1954) - Luke Carnoch
- The Sea Shall Not Have Them (1954) - Wing Commander Dixon
- The Dark Avenger (1955) - Sir Bruce
- The Adventures of Quentin Durward (aka Quentin Durward) (1955) - Lord Malcolm
- Now and Forever (1956) - Doctor
- The Man Who Never Was (1956) - The Father
- The Barretts of Wimpole Street (1957) - Dr. Ford-Waterlow
- Seven Waves Away (1957) - Daniel Cane
- The Naked Truth (1957) - Mactavish
- Violent Playground (1958) - Superintendent
- Law and Disorder (1958) - (uncredited)
- The Inn of the Sixth Happiness (1958) - Dr. Robinson
- Beyond This Place (1959) - Chief Inspector Dale
- Left Right and Centre (1959) - Grimsby Armfield
- North West Frontier (1959) - British Correspondent
- The Battle of the Sexes (1960) - Graham
- Greyfriars Bobby (1961) - Magistrate
- Light in the Piazza (1962) - The Minister
- The Birthday Party (1968) - Pete Bowles
- Hell Boats (1970) - Vice Admiral Ashurst
- One More Time (1970) - Minister
