= Robert Aldous =

English retired actor (born 1934)

- Born: 1934 (age 91–92); Mansfield, Nottinghamshire, England
- Occupation: Actor
- Years active: 1956–1991, 2014, 2019

Robert Aldous (born 1934) is an English retired actor.

Robert (Bob) trained as an actor at the Royal Academy of Dramatic Art, 1953–55. In a long and varied career, his main priority was the stage and he has acted with most of the major regional theatre companies and toured extensively in the UK and overseas. He was for two years associated with the English Stage Company at the Royal Court Theatre and appeared in The School for Scandal at the Theatre Royal, Haymarket, and in An Enemy of the People and Peter Pan at the National Theatre. For thirty years he was the “baddie” in big provincial pantomimes! On television he can claim appearances in Dad's Army, Dr Who, “Allo,”Allo! and The First Churchills, the first ever colour television serial. He also specialised in productions requiring the Nottingham dialect, with which he helped many performers. Robert has served on the Equity Council, the Arts Council’s Drama Advisory Panel and on the Actors’ Church Union Council of Management and on St Paul's Cathedral Friends’ Council. He retired at the age of 79 after a fifty-six-year career.

== Filmography ==
=== Film ===
Year	Title	Role	Notes
1956	She Stoops to Conquer	Dick Muggins	TV film
1960	Saturday Night and Sunday Morning	Onlooker	Uncredited
1973	Matushka	Furmanov	London Film Festival
1976	The Widowing of Mrs. Holroyd	Miner	TV film

Also appeared in two documentaries for the National Coal Board.

=== Television ===
Year	Title	Role	Notes
1959	The Golden Spur	David	Recurring role
1959	Redgauntlet	Nicholas Faggot	1 episode
1960	Captain Moonlight: Man of Mystery	PC Stokes	1 episode
1961	Probation Officer	Tom Eely	1 episode
1961	Drama 61-67	Lt. Hilton	Episode: "Drama '61: The Face of the Enemy"
1962	The Net		Episode: "Not Wanted on a Voyage"
1963	Television Club	Assistant	Episode: "The Wade Family: A Day Trip to France - Channel Crossing"
1964	ITV Play of the Week	Dennis	Episode: "Goodnight to Heroes"
1964	Doctor Who	Freedom Fighter	Episode: "World's End"
1966	The Man in the Mirror	Cutler	3 episodes
1969	The Elusive Pimpernel	Hubert	Episode: "The Hostage"
1969	The First Churchills	Colonel Kirke	2 episodes
1969	Dad's Army	German Parachutist	Episode: "Man Hunt"
1970	Z-Cars	Dr. Daniels	Episode: "Nice Bit O' Stuff"
1970	Tom Grattan's War	Otto Keller	3 episodes
1970	Special Branch	Brian Daniels	Episode: "Error of Judgement"
1970	Softly, Softly: Taskforce	Sgt. Lugton	Episode: "Bearings"
1973	Warship	Chief Petty Officer, HMS Omega	Episode: "Subsmash"
1977	Z-Cars	Mr. Adams	Episode: "Quarry"
1986	'Allo 'Allo!	French Peasant	Episode: "Flight of Fancy"
1990	The Bill	George Foster	Episode: "Michael Runs the Family Now"
1991	Jeeves and Wooster	Manager	Episode: "The Con (or, Pearls Mean Tears)"

== Theatre ==
=== West End ===
The Owl and the Pussycat went to see...	Westminster
The School for Scandal	Haymarket / European tour
The Wind in the Willows	Sadler's Wells
The Birthday Shoe Pantomime	Fortune
Serjeant Musgrave's Dance	Royal Court
Look Back In Anger	Royal Court and UK tour
Nekrassov	Royal Court / Edinburgh Festival
Lysistrata	Royal Court / Duke of York's
Roots	Royal Court / Duke of York's
Epitaph for George Dillon	Royal Court / Cambridge
The School for Scandal	Haymarket / Los Angeles tour

=== Tours and Seasons ===
Alice in Wonderland	Royal Shakespeare Theatre
The Marowitz Hamlet	Berlin (West German TV)
The Clandestine Marriage	UK tour
A Christmas Carol	Royal Court /Bournemouth
She Would If She Could	Windsor / UK tour
Heartbreak House	UK tour
The Skin Game	UK tour
The Devil's Disciple	UK tour
Dandy Dick	UK tour
The Cherry Orchard	UK tour
The Birthday Party	UK tour
Entertaining Mr Sloane	UK tour
Wuthering Heights	UK tour
Trap for a Lonely Man	UK tour
Mr & Mrs Nobody	UK tour

=== Regional and Repertory Theatre ===
He was a leading player in seasons at Bristol Old Vic, Belgrade Theatre Coventry, Glasgow Citizen's Theatre, Nottingham Playhouse, Leeds Playhouse, Salisbury Playhouse, Queen's Theatre Hornchurch, Victoria Theatre Stoke, Plymouth Theatre, Cardiff Sherman Theatre, Leicester Haymarket, Farnham Playhouse, Lincoln Theatre Royal and Pitlochry Festival Theatre.

=== Pantomime ===
His background as a straight actor meant that for nearly thirty years he was the used to play the “baddie” in big VARIETY productions, starring such performers as Arthur Askey, Danny La Rue (seven times), Terry Scott, Leslie Crowther, Jimmy Edwards Richard Murdoch and many others.
