= Grandad (song) =

1970 single by Clive Dunn

Single by Clive Dunn
- B-side: "I Play the Spoons"
- Released: 23 October 1970
- Genre: Novelty, children’s music
- Label: EMI Columbia
- Songwriters: Herbie Flowers, Kenny Pickett
- Producers: Peter Dulay, Ray Cameron

"Grandad" is a song written by Herbie Flowers and Kenny Pickett, and recorded by Clive Dunn.

While starring in the long-running BBC situation comedy Dad's Army, Dunn met bassist Herbie Flowers (later of Sky) at a party and on learning he was a songwriter challenged him to write a song for him. Flowers wrote "Grandad" with Creation vocalist Kenny Pickett.

The song was released as a single in November 1970, and, aided by promotion such as appearing on children's shows such as Basil Brush and DJ Tony Blackburn claiming it as his favourite record, in January 1971 reached No. 1 on the UK Singles Chart for three weeks, during which time Dunn celebrated his 51st birthday, and went on to spend a total of 27 weeks on the chart. Dunn never had another hit single, but he did release an album that featured "Grandad" and its B-side "I Play the Spoons", titled Permission to Sing Sir! On the New Zealand Listener charts it peaked at No.3.

From 1979 to 1984, Dunn starred as Charlie "Grandad" Quick in a children's television show titled Grandad, although the series did not use the song as the theme tune.

== See also ==
- "There's No One Quite Like Grandma", 1980 UK Christmas Number One single
