= Stanley McGeagh =

Northern Irish actor (1936–2025)

- Born: 30 August 1936; Belfast, Northern Ireland
- Died: 5 August 2025 (aged 88); Springvale, Victoria, Australia
- Occupation: Actor
- Spouse(s): Deborah Brayshaw (m. 1970, divorced) Judy John

Stanley McGeagh (30 August 1936 – 5 August 2025) was a Northern Irish actor.

== Background ==
McGeagh was born in Belfast on 30 August 1936 to a shipwright father and had four siblings. During World War II, the street the family lived on was bombed and their house reduced to rubble. Their father was one of those people to help dig them out.

Planning to have a career in either rugby or acting, McGeagh initially worked as an assistant statistics officer in the Belfast Corporation Transport Department. When the Northern Ireland Theatre Experiment started in 1959, he auditioned successfully, moving careers and gaining "bit" parts at the Belfast Arts Theatre. Afterwards, he moved to London, joining Joan Littlewood's Theatre Workshop in 1964 as an ensemble player in Oh, What a Lovely War! before making his TV debut in 1967.

While performing in between shows, McGeagh initially came to Australia in 1985 to visit family. After two years of work and travel, performing in a tour of Anything Goes, he decided to stay in Australia.

== Personal life ==
On 28 March 1970, McGeagh married actress Deborah Brayshaw, divorcing sometime afterwards. Upon relocating to Australia, he married artist and mandolin player Judy John. McGeagh died in the Melbourne suburb of Springvale, on 5 August 2025, at the age of 88. He was cremated there.

== Filmography ==
=== Film ===
Year	Title	Role	Notes
1969	Oh! What a Lovely War	Soldier in Gassed Trench	Uncredited
1971	William Webb Ellis, Are You Mad?		Short
1972	Burke & Hare	Sergeant MacTavish	Credited as Stanley McCeagh
1974	The Land That Time Forgot	Hiller	
1975	Carry on Behind	Short-Sighted Man	Uncredited
1978	Carry on Emmannuelle	Fleet Street Journalist	
1982	Gandhi	Prison Guard	
2005	You and Your Stupid Mate	Man at Door	

=== Television ===
Year	Title	Role	Notes
1967	No Hiding Place	Con. Clark	Episode: "Just Like the Old Days"
1967	Haunted	Tom	Episode: "Many Happy Returns"
1968	Softly, Softly	PC Walters	Episodes: "Fortune on the Move: Part 1: Payment" and "Fortune on the Move: Part 2: Refund"
1968	The Spanish Farm	Medical Sergeant	Episode: "The Crime at Vanderlynden's"
1968	Frontier	Lieutenant James Russell	Episode: "The Last of the Line"
1968	Resurrection	Corporal	Episodes: "Dmitri", "Maslova", and "Resurrection"
1968	Dixon of Dock Green	Billy Mahon	Episode: "Olga and the Six Best Men"
1969	Dixon of Dock Green	Jim	Episode: "The One That Got Away"
1969	Callan	Ferguson	Episode: "Let's Kill Everybody"
1969	Thicker Than Water	Porter	Episode: "The Reunion"
1969	Doctor in the House	2nd. Police Sergeant	Episode: "The Rocky Mountain Spotted Fever Casino"
1969	Dad's Army	Sergeant Waller	Episode: "The Lion Has Phones"
1970	Germinal	Miner	Episode: "Mob Rule"
1970	Rules, Rules, Rules	Bill	Episode: "Rules on a Desert Island"
1970	The Doctors	PC Brian	Season 1, episodes 99 and 100
1970	UFO	SHADO Security Man	Episode: "E.S.P."
1971	UFO	SHADO Guard	Episode: "Mindbender"
1971	Budgie	Station Constable	Episode: "A Pair of Charlies"
1971	Doctor Who	Allen	1 episode; serial: Colony in Space
1972	Doctor Who	Castle Guard Drew	2 episodes; serial: The Sea Devils
1972	Scene	Policeman	Episode: "Bank Holiday"; credited as Stanley McGeogh
1972	The Liver Birds	Delivery Man	Episode: "Birds and Bottom Drawers"
1972	Jason King	The Hero	Episode: "An Author in Search of Two Characters"
1972	Villains	Vicar	Episode: "Smudger"
1972	Play For Today	New Member of the Orange Lodge	Episode: "Carson Country"
1975	Churchill's People	Harry Corlett	Episode: "The Derry Boys"
1978	Law & Order	Gladwell's Clerk	Episode: "A Brief's Tale"
1978	Law & Order	Trevor Reid	Episode: "A Prisoner's Tale"
1978	The Onedin Line	Mr Hardy	Episode: "Highly Explosive"
1979	Return of the Saint	2nd Customs Officer	Episode: "The Diplomat's Daughter"
1981	Blood Money	PC Able	Season 1, episode 1
1982	Minder	Police Sergeant	Episode: "Back in Good Old England"
1982	Billy Boy	Police Sergeant	TV film; credited as Stanley McGeach
1984	The Bill	Man in Street	Episode: "A Friend in Need"
1985	Screen Two	Special Security Block Officer	Episode: "Knockback: Part 1"
1986	Big Deal	Court PC	Episode: "Innocent OK?"
1993	Neighbours	Phil Friendly	Episodes 1979 and 2007
2001	Halifax f.p.	Judge's Associate	Episode: "The Scorpion's Kiss"
2002	Worst Best Friends	Bottle Expert	Episode: "The Excursion"
