= Surprise Attack (film) =

1951 British documentary film

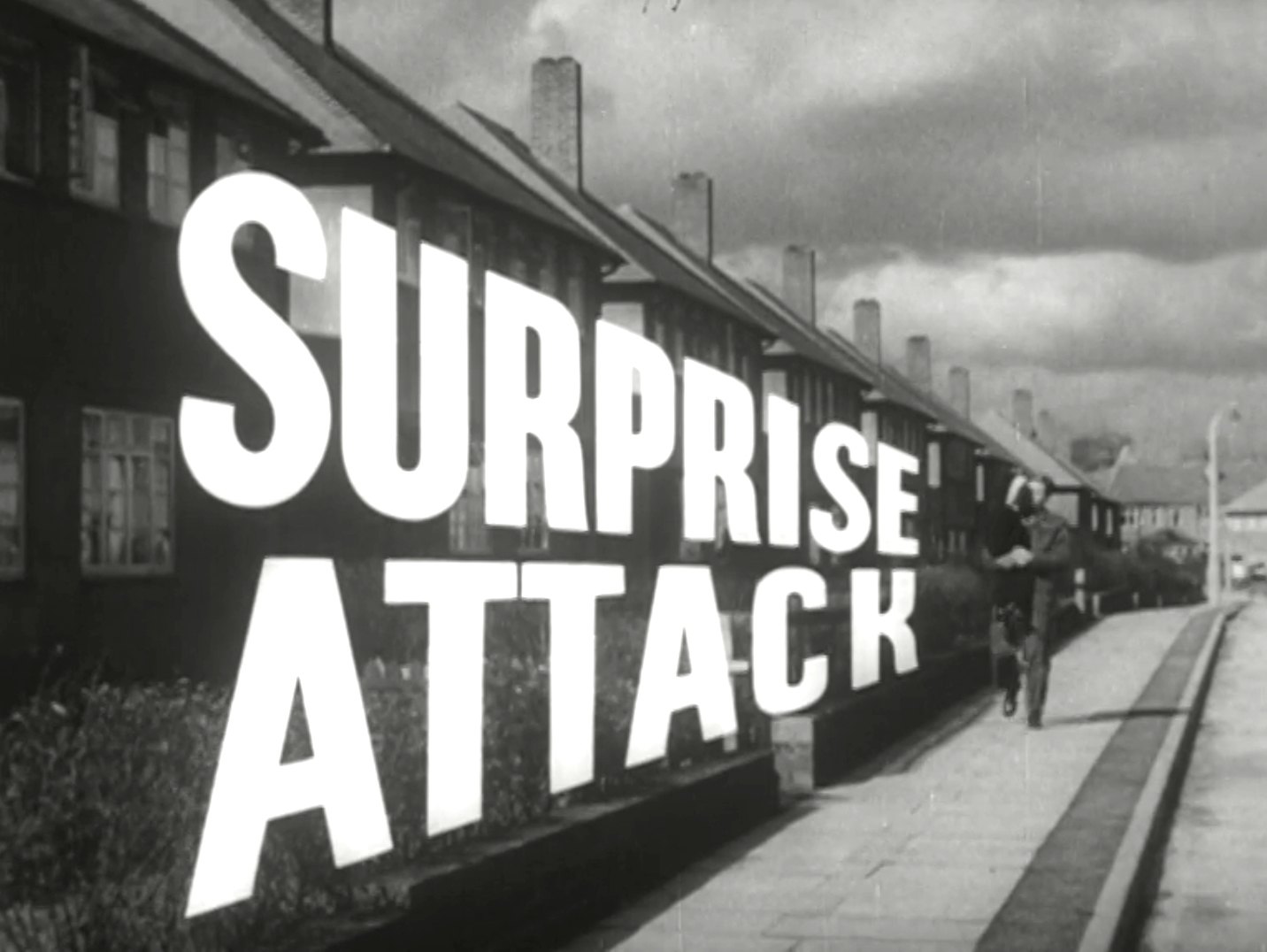
- Starring: John Le Mesurier; Moultrie Kelsall; Jean Anderson; Bill Shine; Clive Dunn
- Production company: Crown Film Unit Production. A Central Office of Information film for the Ministry of Health in collaboration with the Central Council for Health Education.
- Release date: 1951
- Running time: 10 minutes
- Country: United Kingdom
- Language: English

Surprise Attack is a British short film released in 1951 by the Crown Film Unit, and commissioned by the Ministry of Health, depicting the fictional story of a young unvaccinated girl who contracts smallpox after her father returns from the Far East. The film shows how control of a smallpox outbreak in an ordinary English town takes place, co-ordinated by the local medical officer of health (MOH). Although the girl survives the disease, she has to be sent to an isolation hospital and is left permanently scarred. Eleven further cases of smallpox occur, of whom four children die.

John Le Mesurier played the role of the general practitioner (GP) physician in the film, which aimed to demonstrate the risks of ignoring official vaccination advice. The final scene sends a message to parents of the early 1950s that by the time their children are grown up, air travel will be common, creating an opportunity for infectious diseases to enter Britain.

Despite recent outbreaks of smallpox in Britain occurring in 1949 and 1950, the film was a one-off and not part of a wider health education campaign. At least until the early 1960s, no further efforts were made to update or replace the film. Smallpox was ultimately certified to have been globally eradicated in 1980.

== Production ==
Surprise Attack is a short film produced by the Crown Film Unit and commissioned by the Ministry of Health, which aimed to demonstrate the risks of ignoring official vaccination advice. It was released in 1951 and has a running time of 10 minutes.

The cast includes John Le Mesurier as the GP, Moultrie Kelsall as the MOH, Jean Anderson as the matron, Bill Shine as the barber and Clive Dunn as a man in the pub.

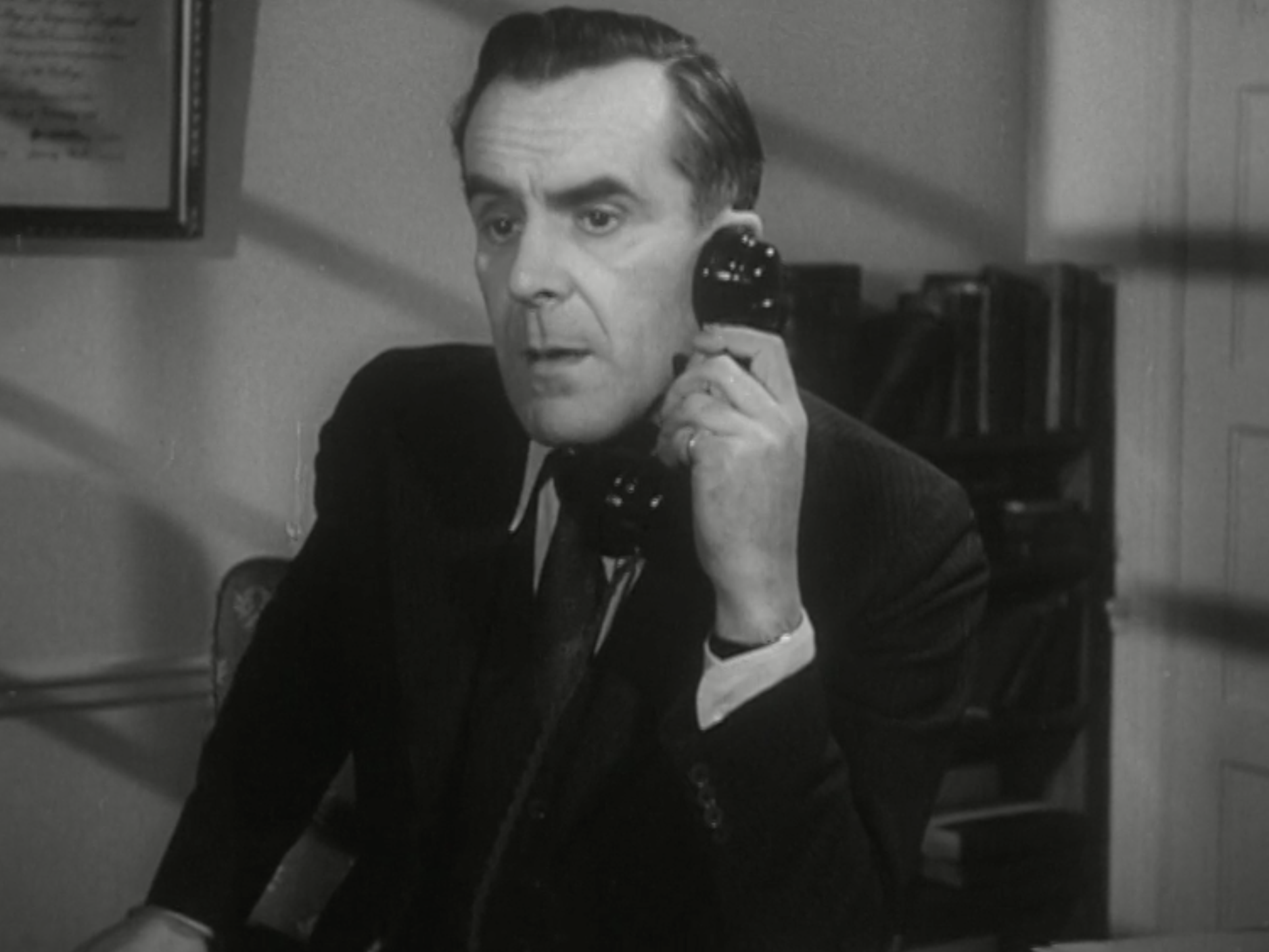
John Le Mesurier

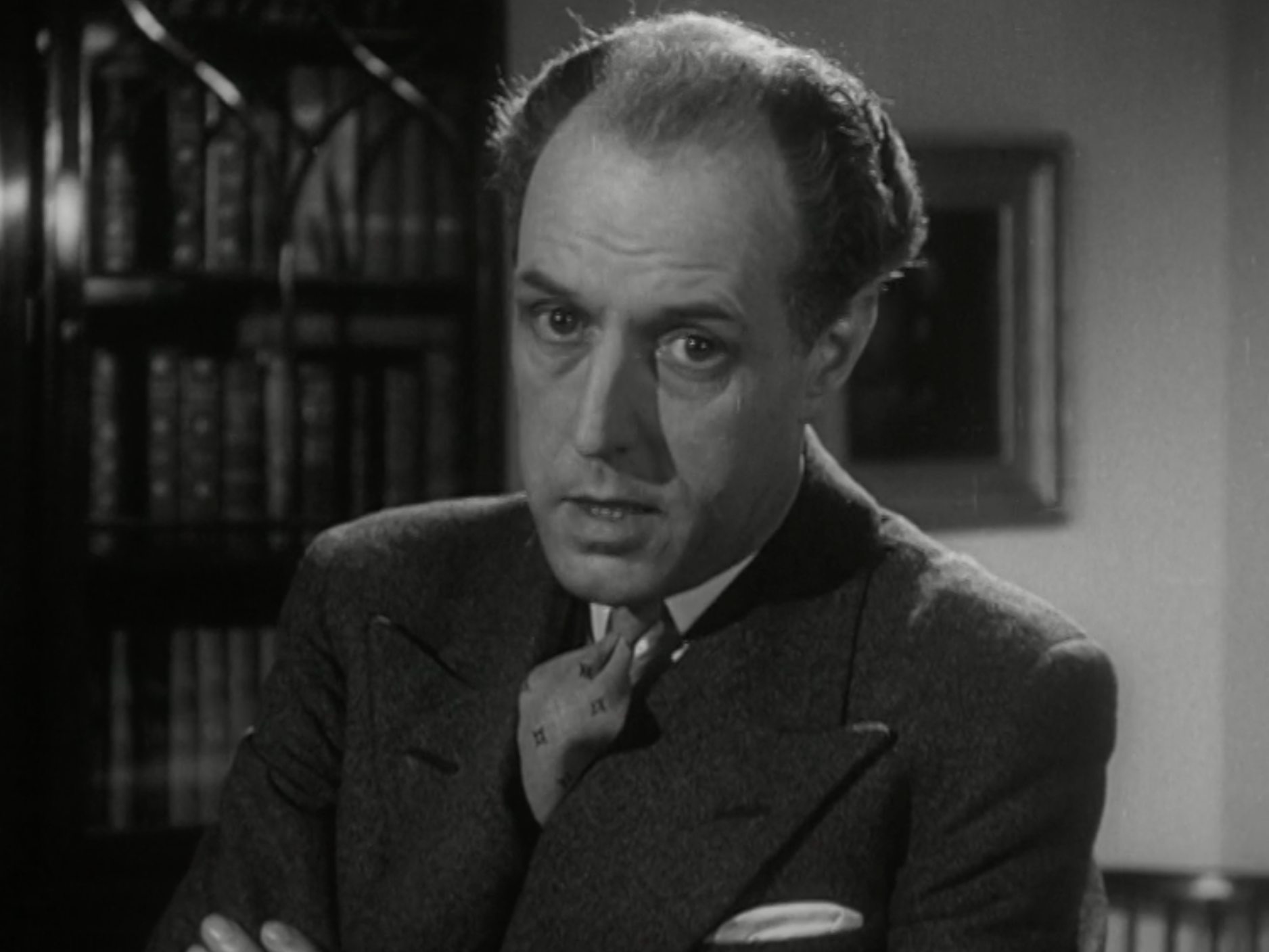
Moultrie Kelsall

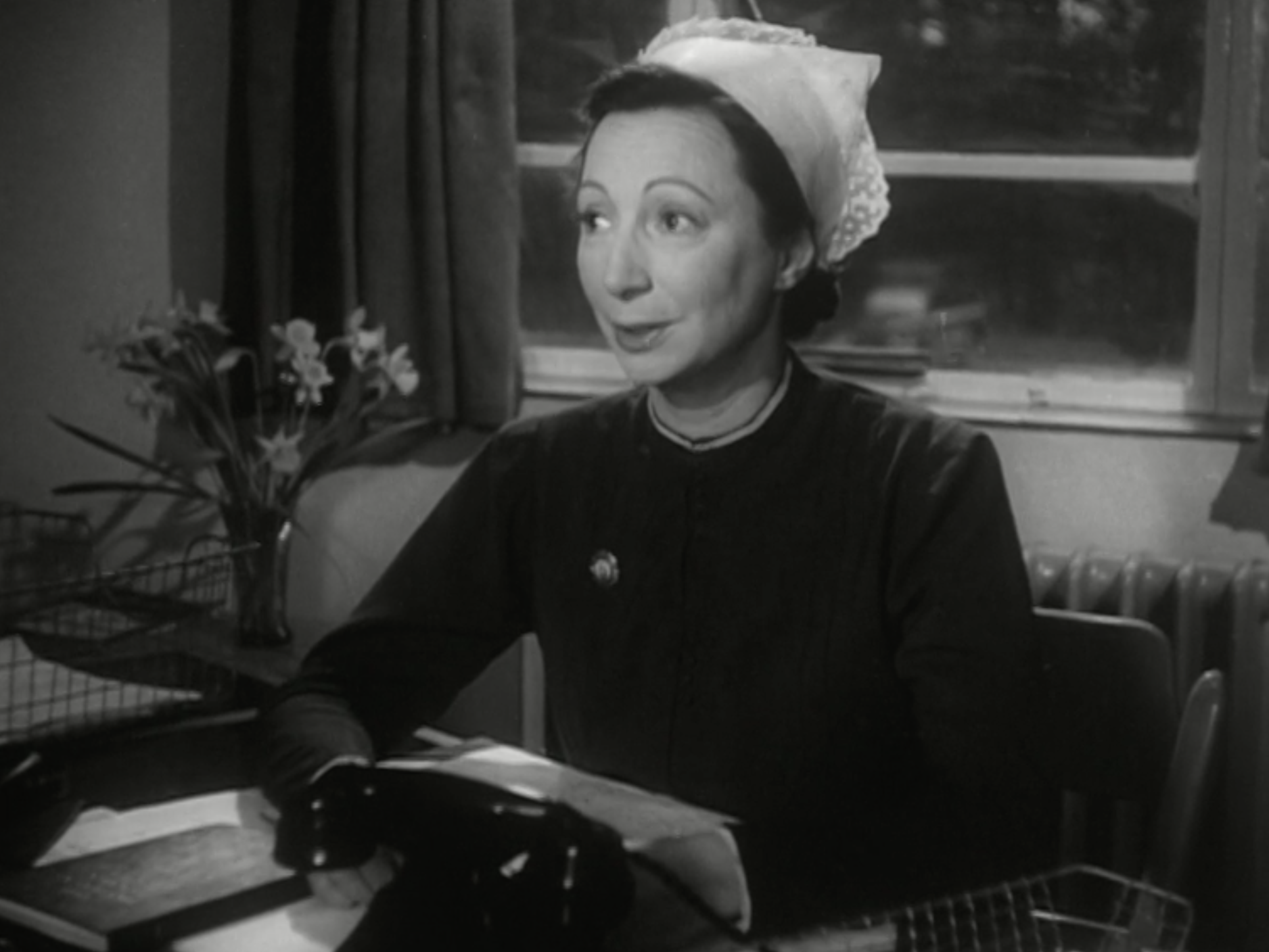
Jean Anderson

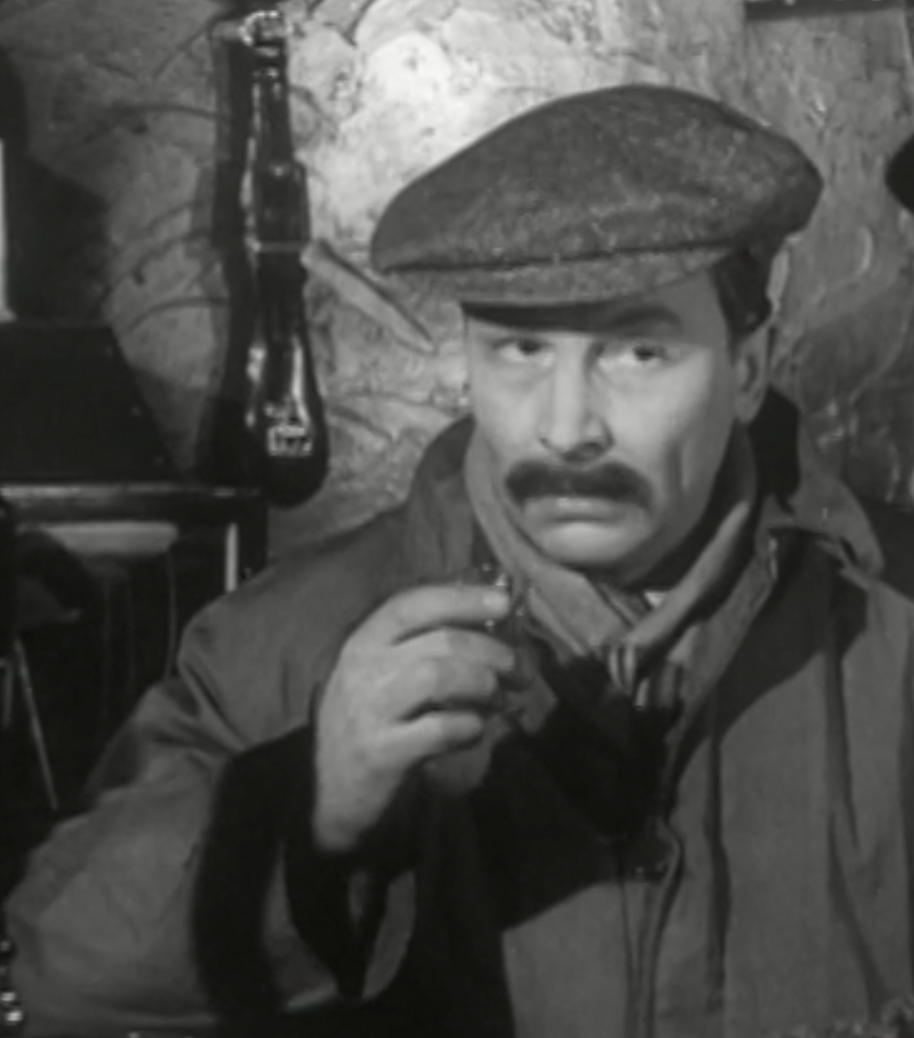
Clive Dunn

== Background ==
The full film

Smallpox vaccination was made compulsory in England and Wales in 1853. Anti-vaccination sentiment existed in the 19th century and early 20th century, possibly being one reason for making the film. From as early as the 1920s, government had seen film as an opportunity to convey public health messages. In Britain, it was noted that the uptake of smallpox vaccination in infants declined once vaccination was made voluntary in 1948. Surprise Attack was a one-off official promotional initiative rather than part of a sustained campaign, despite recent outbreaks of smallpox in Britain occurring in 1949 and 1950. Diphtheria and polio received greater attention and some physicians were of the opinion that ending compulsory vaccination rendered it lower down the priority list.

== Plot ==
Surprise Attack tells a cautionary tale of a young unvaccinated girl who contracts smallpox from a rag doll brought for her by her father, an army N.C.O. on leave and who had recently returned from the Far East. John Le Mesurier played the role of the family general practitioner physician who contacts the local MOH upon suspecting smallpox. The film shows how control of a hypothetical smallpox outbreak in an ordinary English town takes place, co-ordinated by the MOH. Although the girl survives the disease, she has to be sent away to an isolation hospital, and her face is left permanently scarred. Eleven further cases of smallpox occur of which four children die.

Towards the end of the film, the MOH reveals striking images of real cases of smallpox and calls on parents to have their children vaccinated. The film's message to parents of the early 1950s was that by the time their children are grown up, air travel would be common, creating an opportunity for infectious diseases to enter Britain.

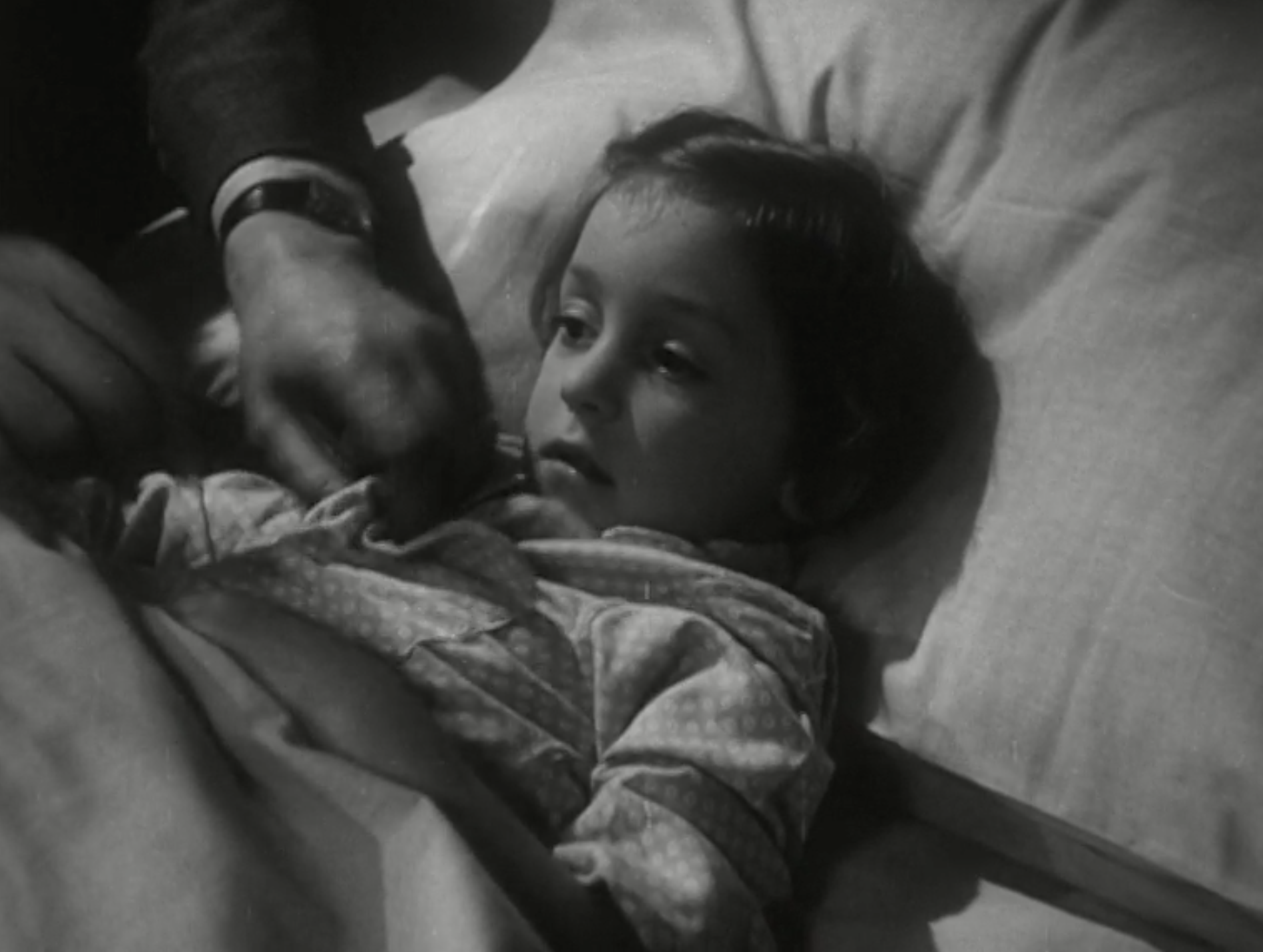
Unvaccinated child later diagnosed with smallpox

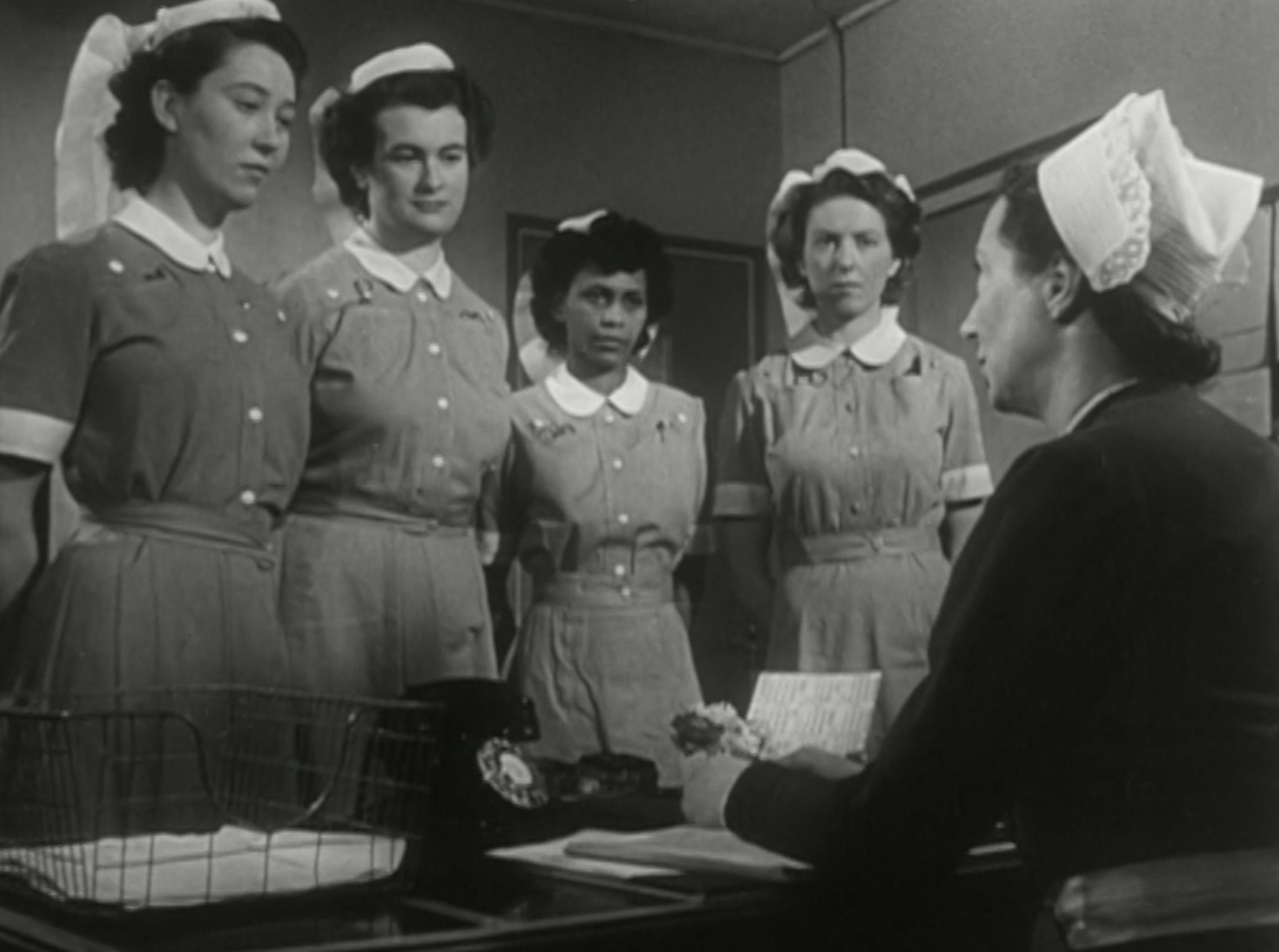
Recruitment of nurses for the isolation hospital

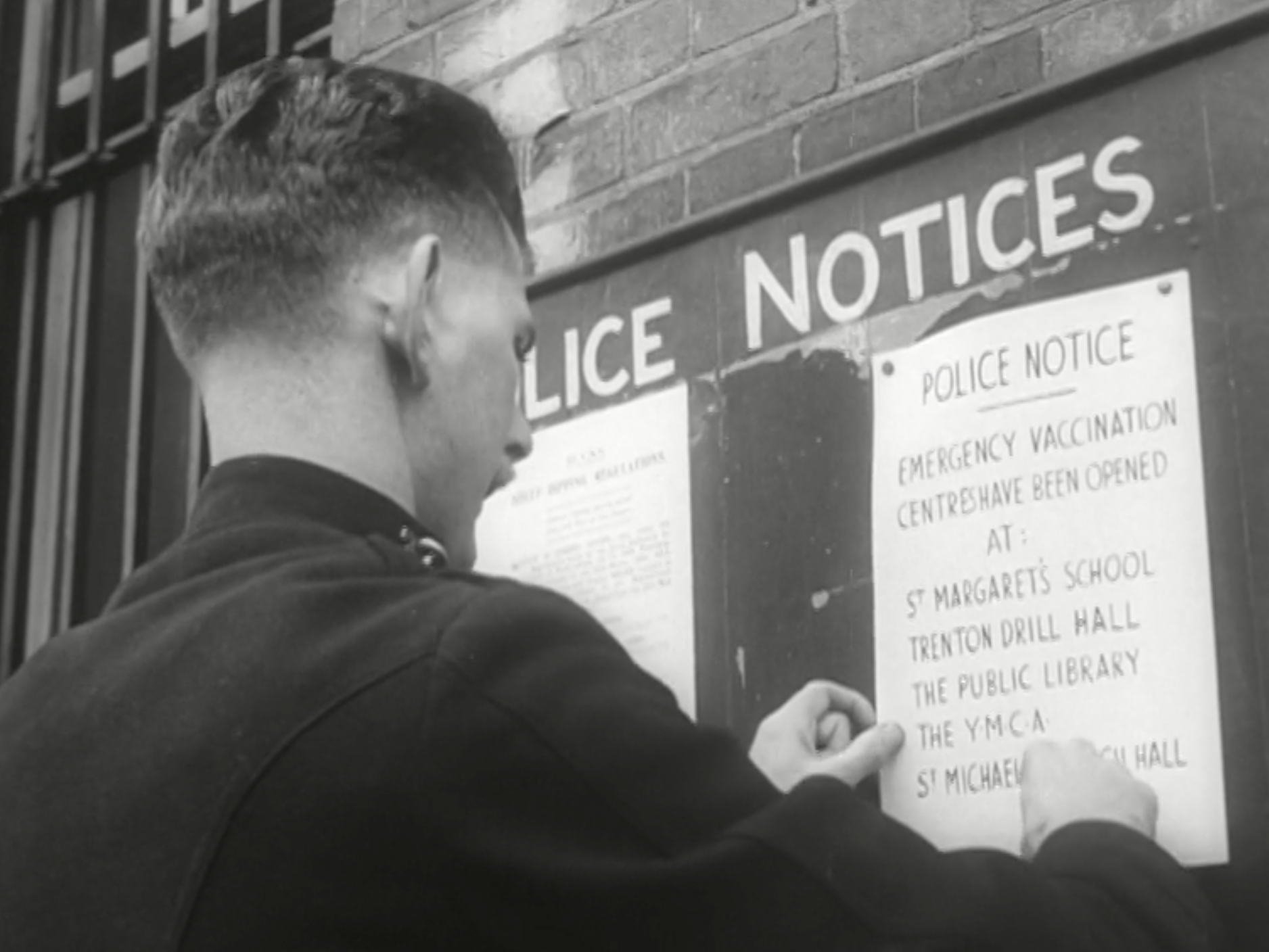
Vaccination notice

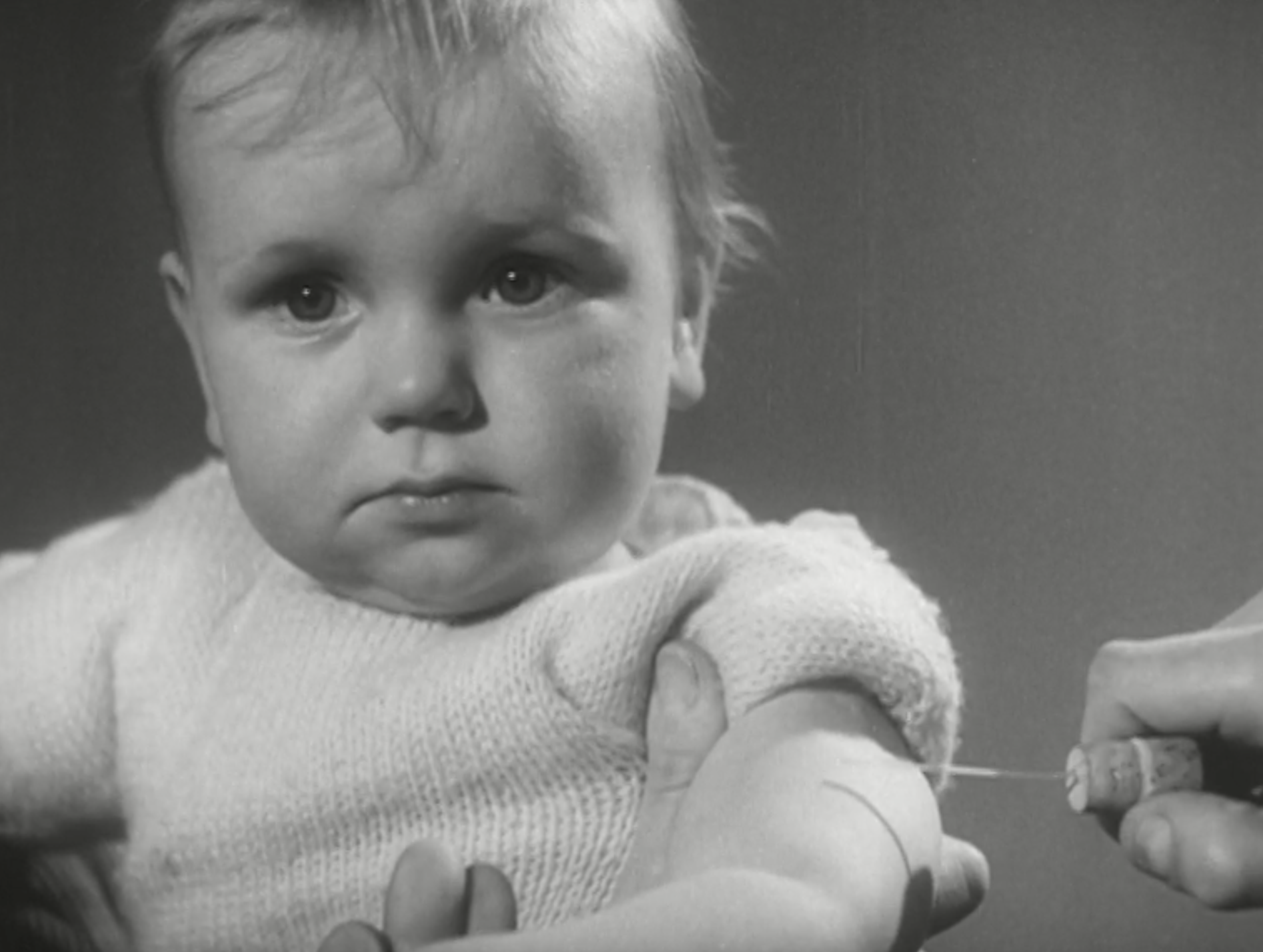
Infant receiving smallpox vaccine

== Reception and legacy ==
There were some objections to the film at the time of its release, including on the grounds that it was improper to suggest that soldiers might import infectious diseases.

At least until the early 1960s, no further efforts were made to update or replace the film. It has been compared to a later film, MMR: What parents want to know, about the MMR vaccine against measles, mumps, and rubella, and has been a resource in schools for teaching about vaccination.
