= Stuart Sherwin =

British television actor

- Born: 16 May 1927; Weston Coyney, Staffordshire
- Died: 23 April 2015 (aged 87); Denville Hall, Northwood
- Occupations: Theatre and television actor
- Years active: 1950s–2006

Stuart James Sherwin (16 May 1927 – 23 April 2015) was a British theatre and television actor. He played several parts in numerous theatre productions, and appeared in several British sitcoms, including Dad's Army (1969–1972), Are You Being Served? (1974–1976), Fawlty Towers (1979), Terry and June (1981) and Yes Minister (1982).

== Career ==
Sherwin was born in Weston Coyney in Staffordshire on 16 May 1927. Following national service in the Army, Sherwin began his acting career in the mid-1950s as part of the Denville Players, a touring theatre troupe. Sherwin regarded the theatre as his forte, appearing in various farces, pantomimes, and variety shows until the early 2000s.

Sherwin began his television career in 1961, appearing in the comedy television film Brian Rix Presents: Will Any Gentleman? opposite Rix. Sherwin later appeared in several television sitcoms co-written by David Croft, notably Dad's Army, in which he played an assistant ARP warden to Chief ARP Warden Hodges, and Are You Being Served?. His final television role was as a man with a dog in the television sitcom Keeping Up Appearances (1991).

== Death ==
Sherwin never married. He died on 23 April 2015, aged 87, at Denville Hall in Northwood, London, a retirement home for British actors and actresses.
