= Shannon's Way =

1948 novel by A. J. Cronin

- First edition (US)
- Author: A. J. Cronin
- Language: English
- Publisher: Gollancz (UK); Little, Brown (US); Ryerson Press (Canada)
- Publication date: 1948
- Publication place: United Kingdom
- Media type: Print (Hardback & Paperback)
- Pages: 313 pp. (US hardback edition)
- ISBN: 0-450-03313-9

Shannon's Way is a 1948 novel by Scots author, A. J. Cronin. It continues the story of Robert Shannon from Cronin's previous novel, The Green Years (1944).

== Plot summary ==
Robert trains to be a doctor at the fictional Levenford Infirmary (Levenford is loosely based on Dumbarton), and falls in love with Jean Law, a young medical student belonging to the Plymouth Brethren who rejects him when she discovers that he has deceived her about his history and religion (he is a Roman Catholic). He develops an interest in a disease contracted from infected cows' milk, and devotes his spare time to researching it: it turns out to be brucellosis. Dr. Shannon contracts a nervous breakdown when he completes the project only to find that someone else has anticipated his results, and is nursed by and marries Jean.
