= Clive Dunn =

English actor (1920–2012)

Clive Dunn OBE
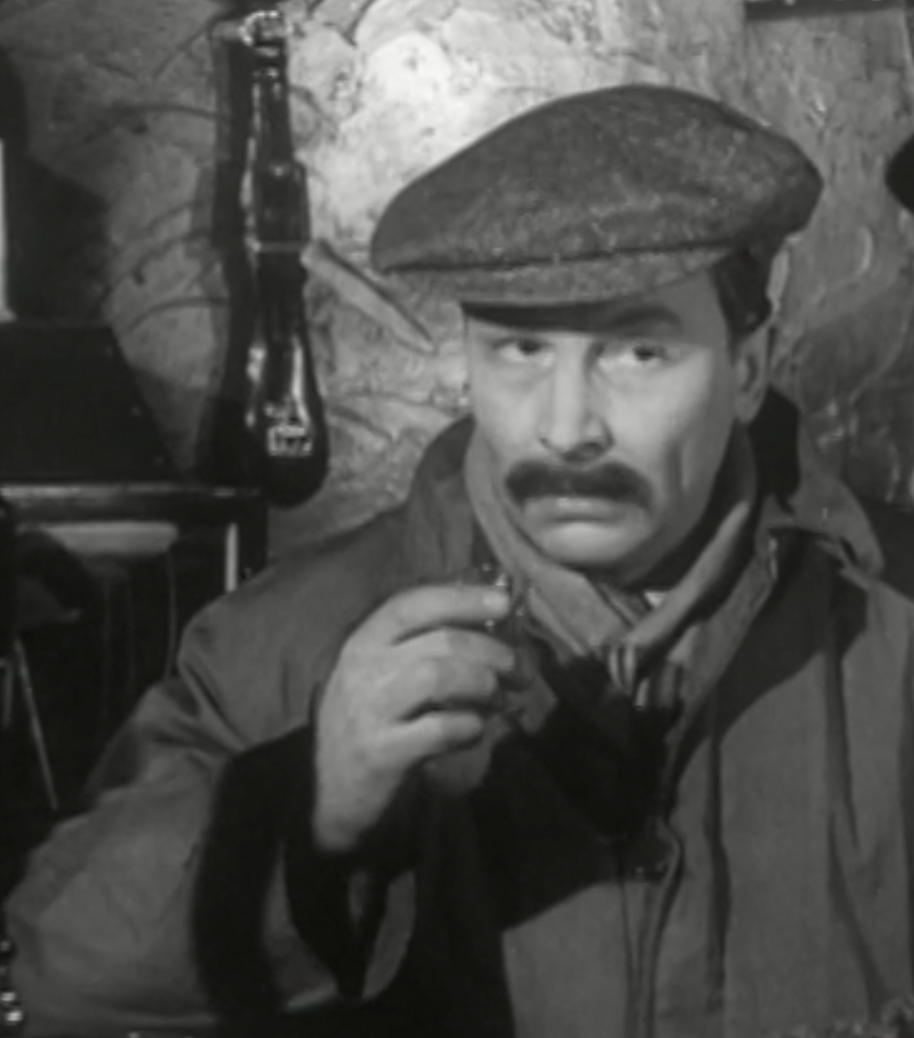
- Dunn in Surprise Attack (1951)
- Born: Robert Bertram Dunn (Note: At least two news sources, both at the time of Dunn's death, have given his middle name as Benjamin. However, this name appears neither in his entry in the Oxford Dictionary of National Biography, citing his birth certificate, nor in The London Gazette at the time of his OBE; both instead say Bertram.); 9 January 1920; Brixton, London, England
- Died: 6 November 2012 (aged 92); Boliqueime, Portugal
- Education: Italia Conti Academy of Theatre Arts
- Occupation: Actor
- Years active: 1935–1984
- Known for: Lance Corporal Jones
- Spouses: Patricia Kenyon (m. 1951; div. 1958); Priscilla Morgan (m. 1959)
- Children: 2
- Relatives: Gretchen Franklin (cousin)
- Military career
- Allegiance: United Kingdom
- Branch: Royal Armoured Corps, British Army
- Rank: Trooper
- Unit: 4th Queen's Own Hussars
- Conflicts: Battle of Greece

Clive Robert Bertram Dunn (born Robert Bertram Dunn; 9 January 1920 – 6 November 2012) was an English actor. Although he was only 48 and one of the youngest cast members, he was cast in a role many years his senior, as the elderly Lance Corporal Jones in the BBC sitcom Dad's Army, which ran for nine series and 80 episodes between 1968 and 1977. As a recording artist, he achieved a number 1 on the UK Singles Chart in 1971 with "Grandad".

Dunn started his acting career in 1935, but this was interrupted by the Second World War, in which he served as a trooper in the 4th Queen's Own Hussars. In 1941, the regiment was forced to surrender after it was overrun during the Greek campaign, and Dunn was held as a POW in Austria for the next four years.

After the war, Dunn resumed his acting career in repertory theatre. He made his first television appearance in 1951 as the man in the pub in Surprise Attack, a short film commissioned by the Ministry of Health. Dunn appeared in both series of The Tony Hancock Show and made many appearances with Tony Hancock, Michael Bentine, Dora Bryan and Dick Emery, among others, before winning the role of Jones in Dad's Army in 1968.

After Dad's Army ended, Dunn capitalised on his reputation for playing elderly character roles by playing the lead character Charlie Quick, in the slapstick children's TV series Grandad, from 1979 to 1984.

== Early life ==
Born in Brixton, south London, Robert Bertram Dunn was the son of actor parents, and the cousin of actress Gretchen Franklin. Dunn was educated at Sevenoaks School in Kent, an independent school for boys (now co-educational). After leaving school, Dunn studied at the independent Italia Conti Academy of Theatre Arts in London.

He had a few small film roles in the 1930s. While still attending school, he appeared with Will Hay in the films Boys Will Be Boys (1935), and Good Morning, Boys (1937). In 1939, he was the stage manager for a touring production entitled The Unseen Menace. However, the detective play was not a success because the billed star of the show, Terence De Marney, did not appear on stage and his dialogue was supplied by a gramophone recording.

== Military service ==
With the outbreak of the Second World War, Dunn joined the British Army in 1940. He served as a trooper in the 4th Queen's Own Hussars. The regiment was posted to the Middle East arriving on 31 December 1940 and as part of the 1st Armoured Brigade supporting the 6th Australian Infantry Division that fought in the Greek Campaign. Dunn fought in the rearguard action at the Corinth Canal, in April 1941. The regiment was forced to surrender after it was overrun and Dunn was among 400 men who were taken prisoner. Dunn was held in Austria for the next four years. He remained in the army after the war ended, until finally demobilised in 1947.

== Acting career ==
Dunn resumed his acting career in repertory theatre, and adopted the name Clive Dunn when he joined Equity. He soon made his first television appearance. In 1951 he appeared as the man in the pub in Surprise Attack, a short film produced by the Crown Film Unit and commissioned by the Ministry of Health.

In 1956 and 1957, Dunn appeared in both series of The Tony Hancock Show and the army reunion party episode of Hancock's Half Hour in 1960. In the 1960s, he made many appearances with Tony Hancock, Michael Bentine, Dora Bryan and Dick Emery, among others, before winning the role of Jones in Dad's Army in 1968.

From early in his career, his trademark character was that of a doddering old man. This first made an impression in the show Bootsie and Snudge, a spin-off from The Army Game. Dunn played the old dogsbody Mr. Johnson at a slightly seedy gentlemen's club where the characters Pte. "Bootsie" Bisley (Alfie Bass) and Sgt. Claude Snudge (Bill Fraser) find work after leaving the Army. In the early 1960s he made regular appearances on It's a Square World, including as the first parody of Doctor Who on New Year's Eve 1963.

In 1967, he made a guest appearance in an episode of The Avengers, playing the proprietor of a toy shop in "Something Nasty in the Nursery".

At 48 Dunn was one of the younger members of the Dad's Army cast when he took on the role of the elderly butcher whose military service in earlier wars made him the most experienced member of the Walmington-on-Sea Home Guard, as well as one of the most decrepit. Jack Haig and David Jason had previously been considered for the role. Although made-up to look much older than he was, his relative youth, compared with most of the cast, meant that he was handed much of the physical comedy in the show, of which many of the other cast members were no longer capable.

After Dad's Army ended, Dunn capitalised on his skill in playing elderly character roles by playing the lead character Charlie Quick, in the slapstick children's TV series Grandad, from 1979 to 1984 (he played the caretaker at a village hall, and sang the lyrics in the theme). He had previously had a number one hit single with the song "Grandad" on his 51st birthday in January 1971, accompanied by a children's choir. The song was written by bassist Herbie Flowers. He performed the song four times on Top of the Pops. The B-side of "Grandad", "I Play The Spoons", also received considerable airplay. After cancellation of Grandad in 1984, he retired to Portugal. Following the success of the "Grandad" record, Dunn released several other singles, but never hit the charts again.

He played Frosch in the 1979 English National Opera production of Die Fledermaus at the London Coliseum, where "tipsy in walk and talk, and reminding us of the best of music-hall traditions" he, and Eric Shilling (as Frank), "made the opening of Act 3 as hilarious as it should be".

He was the subject of This Is Your Life in 1971, when he was surprised by Eamonn Andrews.

== Personal life ==
He married fashion model Patricia Kenyon in London in 1951. The couple divorced in 1958. He married actress Priscilla Pughe-Morgan (born 14 January 1934) in June 1959. They had two daughters.

A 2006 article described Dunn as having eye trouble and sometimes being unable to see, but otherwise appearing to be in good health. In August 2008, he recorded a message for the programme Jonathan Ross Salutes Dad's Army, which was shown to celebrate the fortieth anniversary of Dad's Army.

He spent the last three decades of his life in the Algarve, Portugal, and occupied himself as an artist, painting portraits, landscapes and seascapes, until his sight failed.

Dunn was a supporter of the Labour Party. He said that his outspoken socialist beliefs often caused conflict with his Dad's Army co-star, Arthur Lowe, who was a staunch conservative. When Dunn was appointed an Officer of the Order of the British Empire (OBE) in 1975, it was reported that Lowe would only accept a higher-rated honour from the Queen. As a schoolboy, Dunn and his classmates had briefly joined the British Union of Fascists, but Dunn left the party once he learned of its anti-Semitic ideology.

== Death ==
Dunn died at his home in Boliqueime, Portugal, on 6 November 2012 as a result of complications from an operation that had taken place earlier that week. His agent, Peter Charlesworth, said the star would be "sorely missed" and that his death was "a real loss to the acting profession".

Frank Williams, who played the Vicar in Dad's Army, said Dunn was always "great fun" to be around. "Of course he was so much younger than the part he played," he told BBC Radio Four. "It's very difficult to think of him as an old man really, but he was a wonderful person to work with – great sense of humour, always fun, a great joy really."

Ian Lavender, who played Private Pike in the show, said: "Out of all of us he had the most time for the fans. Everyone at one time or another would be tempted to duck into a doorway or bury their head in a paper; but not Clive, he always made time for fans."

== Filmography ==
=== Films ===
Film
| Year | Title | Role | Notes |
|---|---|---|---|
| 1935 | Boys Will Be Boys | Schoolboy watching rugby | Uncredited |
| 1937 | Good Morning, Boys | Minor role | Uncredited |
| 1938 | A Yank at Oxford | Minor role | Uncredited |
| 1939 | Goodbye, Mr. Chips | Youth | Uncredited |
| 1949 | The Hasty Heart | MacDougall | Uncredited |
| 1949 | Boys in Brown | Holdup Man | Uncredited |
| 1959 | The Treasure of San Teresa | Cemetery keeper | |
| 1961 | What a Whopper | Mr. Slate | |
| 1962 | She'll Have to Go | Chemist | |
| 1962 | The Fast Lady | Old Gentleman in Burning House | |
| 1963 | The Mouse on the Moon | Bandleader | |
| 1965 | You Must Be Joking! | Doorman | |
| 1967 | Just like a Woman | Graff von Fischer | |
| 1968 | The Mini-Affair | Tyson | |
| 1968 | 30 Is a Dangerous Age, Cynthia | Doctor | |
| 1968 | The Bliss of Mrs. Blossom | Dr. Zimmerman | |
| 1969 | Crooks and Coronets | Basil | |
| 1969 | The Magic Christian | Sommelier | |
| 1971 | Dad's Army | L.Cpl. Jack Jones | |
| 1980 | The Fiendish Plot of Dr. Fu Manchu | Keeper of the Keys – London Tower | |

=== Television roles ===
Television
| Year | Title | Role | Notes |
|---|---|---|---|
| 1957 | Treasure Island | Ben Gunn | remake of 1951 series |
| 1960–63 | Bootsie and Snudge | Henry Johnson | |
| 1963 | It's a Square World | various | |
| 1968 | Inside George Webley | Ticket collector | 1 episode |
| 1968–77 | Dad's Army | Lance-Corporal Jack Jones | |
| 1970 | Here Come the Double Deckers! | Hodge | |
| 1974–75 | My Old Man | Sam Cobbett | |
| 1979–84 | Grandad | Charlie Quick | |

=== Singles ===
- "Such a Beauty" / "Too Old", Parlophone, 1962
- "Grandad" / "I Play the Spoons", Columbia, 1970 (reached No. 1 in the UK in January 1971)
- "My Lady (Nana)" / "Tissue Paper & Comb", Columbia, 1971
- "Wonderful Lilly" / "Pretty Little Song", Columbia, 1972
- "Let's Take A Walk" / "Tell Us", Columbia, 1972
- "Our Song" / "She's Gone", EMI, 1973
- "Grandad" / "My Lady (Nana)" (reissue), EMI, 1973
- "My Old Man" / "My Own Special Girl", EMI, 1974
- "Holding On" / "My Beautiful England", Reprise, 1976
- "Goodnight Ruby" / "Thank You and Goodnight", Decca, 1977
- "Thinking of You This Christmas" / "'Arry 'Arry 'Arry", Sky Records, 1978
- "There Ain't Much Change from a Pound These Days" / "After All These Years" (with John Le Mesurier), KA Records, 1982
- "Grandad" (reissue) / "There's No-One Quite Like Grandma", EMI, 1988

=== Non-fiction ===
- Permission to Speak: An Autobiography (1986)
- Permission to Laugh: My Favourite Funny Stories (1996)
