= Attenborough (surname) =

- Pronunciation: UK: /ˈætənbərə/ AT-ən-bər-ə; US: /ˈætənbəroʊ/ AT-ən-bər-oh
- Language: English

Attenborough is an English surname derived from Attenborough, Nottinghamshire, or similar toponym. Notable people of the name include:

- Charlotte Attenborough (born 1959), British actress; daughter of Richard, sister of Michael and Jane
- David Attenborough (born 1926), English television executive, presenter and naturalist; brother of Richard and John
- Frederick Attenborough (1887–1973), English academic; father of Richard, David, and John
- Geoffrey Attenborough (born 1951), South Australian cricketer
- Jane Attenborough (1955–2004), English arts administrator and manager; daughter of Richard, sister of Michael and Charlotte
- John Attenborough (1928–2012), executive at Alfa Romeo and financial advisor; brother of Richard and David
- Michael Attenborough (born 1950), English theatre director; son of Richard, brother of Jane and Charlotte
- Richard Attenborough (1923–2014), English film actor, director and producer; brother of David and John
- Thomas Attenborough (1833–1907), English cricketer
- Tom Attenborough (born 1986), British theatre director; son of Michael, brother of Will
- Walter Attenborough (1850–1932), British politician
- Will Attenborough (born 1991), British actor; son of Michael, brother of Tom
