= Mary Attenborough =

British philanthropist and social activist (1896–1961)

- Born: Mary Clegg; 8 April 1896; Sawley, Long Eaton, Derbyshire, England
- Died: July 1961 (aged 65)
- Occupations: Philanthropist; social activist
- Known for: Social work
- Spouse: Frederick Attenborough (m. 1922)
- Children: Richard; David; John
- Relatives: Michael Attenborough (grandson); Jane Attenborough (granddaughter); Charlotte Attenborough (granddaughter); Tom Attenborough (great-grandson); Will Attenborough (great-grandson)

Mary Attenborough (née Clegg; 8 April 1896 – July 1961) was a British philanthropist and social activist, the wife of Frederick Attenborough, mother of Richard, David, and John Attenborough, and advocate for safety and education of children. She played a key role in organising and fundraising to ensure the safe reception and care of child refugees arriving in Leicester during the Spanish Civil War and the Second World War.

== Early life and education ==
Mary Attenborough (née Clegg) was born on 8 April 1896 in New Sawley, Long Eaton, Derbyshire. She was the eldest of six children of Samuel Clegg, later headteacher of The Long Eaton School, and his wife Mary (née Bradshaw). Between 1910 and 1913, she attended The Long Eaton School, where her father was the head.

== First World War and interwar period ==
Limited information on Attenborough's activities between 1913 and 1922 suggest she was sympathetic to the suffrage movement, though whether she was active in that movement is not clear. During the First World War she likely volunteered on a farm in the village of Costock. In early 1914 she travelled to Sorbonne in Paris.

In the interwar period Attenborough was Secretary for the Leicestershire Committee for the Basque Children.

== Second World War ==
Attenborough assisted refugee children arriving in Leicester via the kindertransport in the Second World War.

== Death ==
She died in a car accident in July 1961 aged 65.

== Bibliography ==
- Graves, Richard (2022). The Life and Times of Mary Attenborough (1896-1961). Book Guild Limited. ISBN 978-1-914471-14-8.
