= Attenborough =

Attenborough may refer to:

== People ==
- Attenborough (surname)

== Places ==
- Attenborough, Nottinghamshire, a village and suburb in England
  - Attenborough railway station
  - Attenborough Nature Reserve
- Attenborough Building, University of Leicester, England

== Other uses ==
- The Attenborough Prize, an annual contemporary visual arts prize

== See also ==
- Attenborough in Paradise and Other Personal Voyages, a DVD collection of seven David Attenborough BBC documentary specials
  - Attenborough in Paradise (1996), a BBC television nature documentary written and presented by David Attenborough
- Attenborough Cortitch, a Japanese anime character in Gurren Lagann
