= Deirdre Benner =

British actress (1937–1999)

Deirdre Benner was a British actress known for her acting roles both in television and film during the 1950s and the 1960s.

== Biography ==
Benner, was born on 19 April 1937, in Greenwich London, graduating from RADA in 1955. She married actor, Gerald Sim in 1967 and they set up home in Hampton, London. Benner died at the age of 62, on 20 November 1999, in Kingston upon Thames.

Her sister in law was the renowned actress, Sheila Sim, the wife of Richard Attenborough.

== Roles ==
Benner was in demand for many television roles including for BBC Sunday Night Theatre, Champion House and Dixon of Dock Green.

In 1969, she appeared with her husband Gerald, in the short children's film, Mischeif, in which she played the role of mother, Gwyneth Brewer.
