= Cheese grater (disambiguation) =

A cheese grater is a grater used for cheese.

Cheese grater may also refer to:

- The Cheese Grater, a student magazine of University College London
- A nickname for the surform industrial tool

== Building nicknames ==
- 111 George Street, a skyscraper in Brisbane
- The SAHMRI building in Adelaide, Australia
- 122 Leadenhall Street in London, England
- The Attenborough Building building at Leicester University, England
