= Denville Hall =

British retirement home for actors and actresses

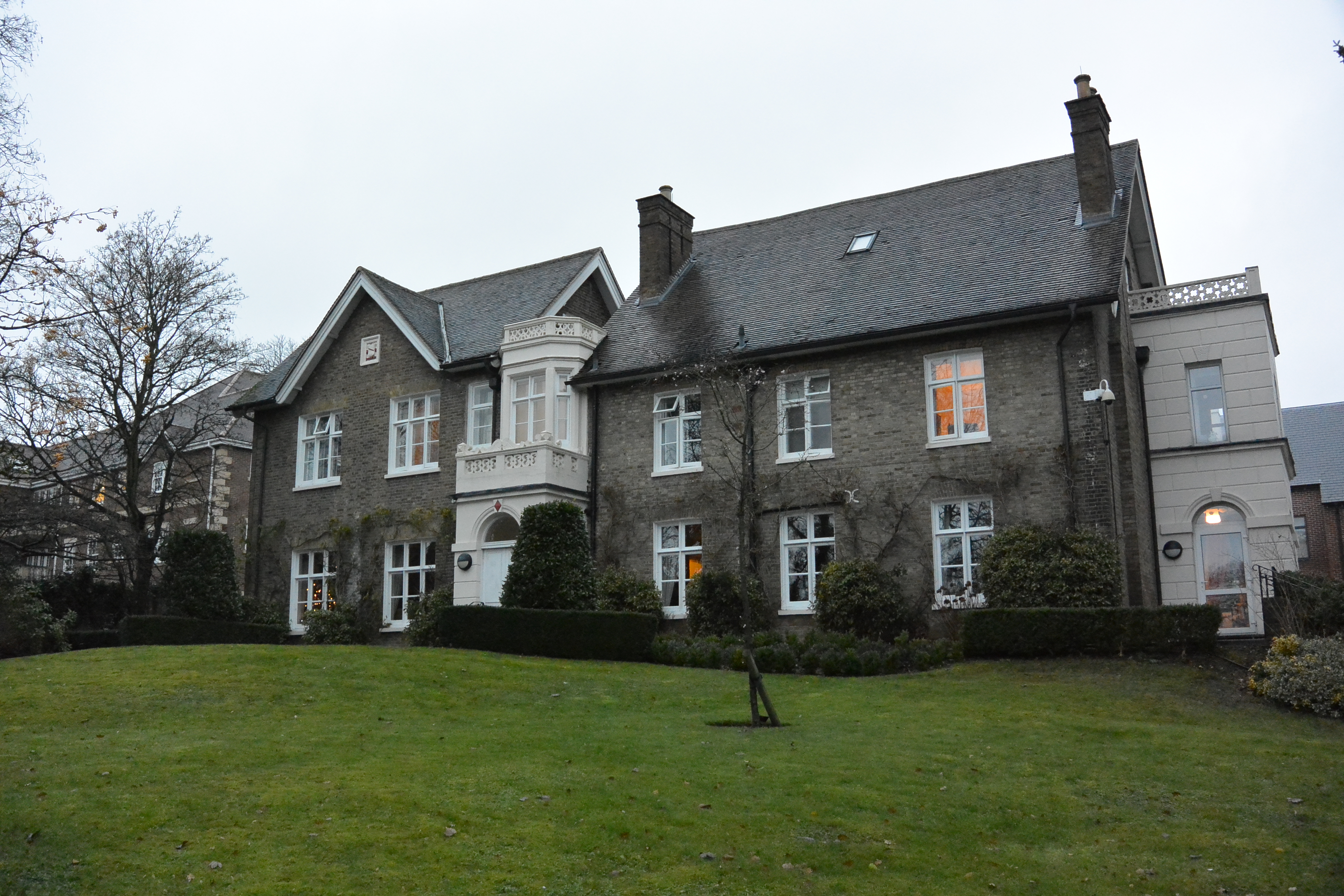
- The building in December 2013
- Former names: Maze Farm; Northwood Hall

General information
- Location: 62 Ducks Hill Road, Northwood, London, England
- Coordinates: 51.61029°N 0.44049°W
- Renovated: 2004
- Owner: Denville Hall Ltd.

Design and construction
- Designations: Locally listed

Website
- denvillehall.org.uk

Denville Hall is a historic building in Northwood, a town in the London Borough of Hillingdon, England, which is used as a retirement home for professional actors, actresses and members of other theatrical professions. The present building incorporates part of a 16th-century house, which was substantially rebuilt in 1851 and later considerably extended after becoming a retirement home in 1926. Many well-known British actors and actresses have lived there.

== History and description ==
The hall includes part of a 16th-century house called Maze Farm. In the 18th century it belonged to the judge Sir John Vaughan. In 1851 it was rebuilt in Victorian Gothic style by Daniel Norton, and renamed Northwood Hall. Alfred Denville, impresario, actor-manager and MP, bought the hall in 1925 and dedicated it to the acting profession in memory of his son Jack, who had died at the age of 26 after onstage complications with re-aggravated World War I injuries. He renamed the building Denville Hall and created a charity in the same name. It was opened formally as a rest home in July 1926 by Princess Louise, the then Princess Royal.

The building, heavily extended in the intervening years, is locally listed. A further remodelling and expansion project with landscaping, by Acanthus LW Architects, was completed in 2004.

== Facilities and services ==
Though actors and actresses have priority, the home is available to other people in the entertainment industry (including the circus), such as agents and dancers, and their spouses over the age of 70 and offers residential, nursing, convalescent, dementia and palliative care. Residents can stay on a long-term or short-term basis, and physiotherapy is provided. There is also a subsidised bar.

== Notable residents ==
Many British actors and actresses have spent their retirement years at Denville Hall, including: (Note: All actors and actresses listed here are deceased)

- Nicholas Amer
- Richard Attenborough
- Stanley Baxter
- Gabrielle Blunt
- Jean Boht
- Margot Boyd
- Nan Braunton
- Alan Brien
- Tony Britton
- Maurice Browning
- Douglas Byng
- Patsy Byrne
- Peter Byrne
- Kathleen Byron
- Brian Cant
- Pat Coombs
- Brenda Cowling
- Aimée Delamain
- Maurice Denham
- Marianne Faithfull
- Leonard Fenton
- Dulcie Gray
- Peter Hall
- Margaret Harris
- Robert Hardy
- Doris Hare
- Rose Hill
- John Horsley
- Geoffrey Keen
- Jo Kendall
- Annette Kerr
- Mark Kingston
- David Lodge
- Roger MacDougall
- Elspeth March
- Percy Marmont
- Betty Marsden
- Frank Middlemass
- Ernest Milton
- Jeanne Mockford
- Peggy Mount
- Daphne Oxenford
- Muriel Pavlow
- Richard Pearson
- Michael Pennington
- Joan Plowright
- Arnold Ridley
- Brian Rix
- Paul Rogers
- Clifford Rose
- Andrew Sachs
- Peter Sallis
- Stuart Sherwin
- Carmen Silvera
- Gerald Sim
- Sheila Sim
- Anthony Steel
- Ronnie Stevens
- John Stuart
- Sylvia Syms
- Malcolm Terris
- Josephine Tewson
- Geoffrey Toone
- Hazel Vincent Wallace
- David Warner
- Moray Watson
- Elisabeth Welch
- Robin Wentworth
- Billie Whitelaw
- John Woodnutt
- Edgar Wreford

== Supporters ==
The hall and charity have had a number of notable supporters. Richard Attenborough, who, like his widow Sheila Sim, resided at Denville Hall, was president. In the late 1960s and early 1970s, performers including Sean Connery, Michael Caine, Paul Scofield and Elizabeth Taylor (for her television debut) donated their fees to rebuilding the house. In 1999 the original set from The Mousetrap, after 47 years' continuous use, was auctioned to raise money for Denville Hall. Restaurateur Elena Salvoni donated a portion of the profits of her 2007 autobiography, Eating Famously, to the hall. Terence Rattigan left his estate to charity, with all royalties from his plays being donated to Denville Hall and the King George V Fund for Actors and Actresses.

== See also ==
- Brinsworth House – retirement home for entertainers
