= The Attenborough Prize =

The Attenborough Prize is an annual prize associated with the Leicester and East Midlands Open Art Competition. It was originally awarded by Richard Attenborough, aiming to celebrate “emerging talent… in visual arts”

The Prize was announced in June 2007 by Lord Attenborough (whose name lends itself to the Prize's eponym) and the leader of Leicester City Council. The announcement was to coincide with Lord Attenborough's opening of his personal collection of Picasso Ceramics at the Leicester Museum and Art Gallery (known from 1997 to 2020 as the New Walk Museum and Art Gallery).

The Prize was originally awarded by Lord Attenborough to the best contemporary visual artist exhibiting at the City Gallery’s Open 19 Exhibition, in Leicester, England. Lord Attenborough chaired the committee which selected the Prize’s winner from a shortlist of six artists, chosen from over a thousand exhibiting at the Open Exhibition. Since Lord Attenborough's death in 2014 the prize winner has been selected by an invited panel of judges.

Winners of the prize previously received £2000 and a solo exhibition upstairs at The City Gallery, Leicester. Following the closure of the City Gallery in 2010, the open exhibition moved to the New Walk Museum and Art Gallery. Currently (2022) the prize is £1,000.

== Winners ==
- 2007 (Open 19): Choterina Freer for "In my heart you are my stars forever"
- 2008 (Open 20): Sarah Key for "One of a thousand plateaus"
- 2009 (Open 21): Neil Raitt for "Credit Crunch"
- 2010 (Open 22): David Raine for "My Sister, Emily"
- 2011 (Open 23): Edward Sellman for "Ascension"
- 2013 (Open 24): Bryan Hible for "Happy hoodie spots a ship" and Mark W Russell for "Spotlite, journey from Calvary" (split prize)
- 2014 (Open 25): Oliver Marc Thomas Leger for "Sacre Blue Baleine"
- 2015 (Open 26): Andrea Jaeger for "Here is almost there"
- 2016 (Open 27): Sam Boulton
- 2017 (Open 28): Bradley Phelps for "The Winds of Change"
- 2018 (Open 29): Alison Carpenter-Hughes for "Little Connie"
- 2019 (Open 30): Pete Underhill for "Naughty Sugar"
- 2020 (Open 31): Cancelled due to Covid
- 2021 (Open 32): Edit Nagy for "Iris the Fashion ICON"
- 2022 (Open 33): Susan Isaac for "Lines of Power II"
- 2023 (Open: The People's Exhibition): Pete Underhill for “Ken Tye"
- 2024 (Open: The People's Exhibition): Susan Isaac for "Balance and Counterbalance"
