= No Way Up =

2024 film by Claudio Fäh

- Theatrical release poster
- Directed by: Claudio Fäh
- Written by: Andy Mason
- Produced by: Andy Mason; Annalise Davis
- Starring: Sophie McIntosh; Will Attenborough; Jeremias Amoore; Manuel Pacific; Grace Nettle; Phyllis Logan; Colm Meaney
- Cinematography: Andrew Rodger
- Edited by: Adam Recht
- Music by: Andy Gray
- Production companies: Ingenious Media; Altitude Film Entertainment; Dimension Studio; Hyprr Films
- Distributed by: Altitude Film Distribution (UK/Ireland); RLJE Films (United States)
- Release dates: January 18, 2024 (Russia); February 12, 2024 (United Kingdom); February 16, 2024 (United States)
- Running time: 90 minutes
- Countries: United Kingdom; United States
- Language: English
- Box office: $4.5 million

No Way Up is a 2024 survival thriller film directed by Claudio Fäh and written by Andy Mayson. It stars Sophie McIntosh, Will Attenborough, Jeremias Amoore, Manuel Pacific, Grace Nettle, Phyllis Logan and Colm Meaney.

No Way Up was released in the United Kingdom on February 12, 2024, and in the United States on February 16, 2024.

== Plot ==
During a Vista Airlines flight from LAX to Los Cabos, the plane hits birds and crashes into the Pacific Ocean, killing the flight crew and most of the passengers. The survivors - Ava (the daughter of a prominent politician) and her boyfriend Jed, Jed's friend Kyle, a young girl named Rosa traveling with her grandparents (her grandmother Mardy 'Nana' survived), Ava's personal bodyguard Brandon and flight attendant Danilo - find themselves trapped inside an air pocket at the rear of the fuselage as it sinks to a rock base underwater.

At first, Brandon takes charge, telling the survivors they must stay put and await rescue. On his way to retrieve an oxygen tank from the front of the plane, a tiger shark attacks Brandon through an opening in the fuselage. He manages to escape back to where the survivors are waiting, but is quickly dragged back by the shark.

Kyle's arm is severely injured in the crash, so Nana, a former army nurse, treats it in the aft galley with a makeshift splint. Meanwhile, a rescue crew arrives by helicopter to search for the missing plane. The remaining survivors argue over what their next course of action should be, figuring they should do what Brandon would have done. Ava reasons they have three or four hours of air left before they run out, and Jed explains that eventually the fuselage will implode from the depth pressure. At that moment, the wreckage slides down the rock face, dragging them deeper into the ocean before coming to rest on the edge of a cliff leading into a dark abyss.

The survivors decide to leave the aircraft and swim to the surface. Rosa explains that sharks are afraid of air bubbles, so they reason they can scare the sharks away with bubbles from their inflatable life vests and go in search of diving gear throughout the plane. Meanwhile, the rescue helicopter spots debris from the plane on the surface of the water. Two rescue divers are sent down to investigate the wreckage. They encounter the wrecked plane with the survivors, but are attacked by the shark as the survivors try to warn them about the shark's presence. One diver is dragged off by the shark, while the second goes missing.

The survivors search for the second diver and are attacked by the shark, which bites off Jed's leg below the knee. He soon goes into shock and dies. Ava retrieves a bag of scuba gear from the baggage area underneath the plane, and the survivors prepare to swim to the surface. Kyle explains he's too afraid to swim to the surface, recounting a moment in his childhood where he dove to the deep end of a pool and was too scared to resurface, but the others convince him to leave the plane with them.

The damaged cockpit breaks off and falls into the dark canyon below the cliff. Nana tells Ava to look after Rosa, explaining that she won't be leaving the plane as she would only slow the group down. As the remaining survivors swim through the flooding fuselage to the exit hole, they encounter the shark swimming toward them. Ava uses the bubbles from her life vest to deter the shark. Before Kyle can leave, he is attacked and killed by the shark, allowing the rest of the survivors to exit the plane. They find the missing diver on their way out, killed by the shark, and use his oxygen tank for air.

Ava gives the only two air tanks to Danilo and Rosa. As they exit the plane, she inflates their life vests, and they quickly float to the surface. Ava is about to exit the plane when she spots the shark heading towards her, and flees through the hole, just as the wreckage slides off the cliff and into the dark abyss below, with the shark inside. As she attempts to reach the surface, she runs out of oxygen, but her life vest carries her up anyway, and she miraculously awakens on the surface. She finds Rosa's stuffed animal floating in the water, but the other survivors are nowhere to be seen. Eventually, the rescue helicopter arrives and picks Ava up, and onboard she finds Danilo and Rosa. Rosa tosses her stuffed animal back into the ocean as a tribute to her grandparents and the other dead passengers as the helicopter flies off to safety.

== Cast ==
- Sophie McIntosh as Ava
- Will Attenborough as Kyle
- Jeremias Amoore as Jed
- Manuel Pacific as Danilo
- Grace Nettle as Rosa
- Colm Meaney as Brandon
- Phyllis Logan as Mardy 'Nana'
- James Carroll Jordan as Hank

== Production ==
No Way Up originally planned to star Kelsey Grammer when the film was introduced at the American Film Market in 2021, alongside plans to shoot the film in Malta. Principal photography took place in London and completed in May 2022.

== Release ==
No Way Up was released in theaters in Russia on January 18, 2024. It was released in the United Kingdom by Altitude Film Distribution on February 12, 2024, and in U.S. theaters and video on demand by RLJE Films on February 16, 2024.

== Reception ==
On the review aggregator website Rotten Tomatoes, 36% of 25 critics' reviews are positive, with an average rating of 4.5/10. The website's consensus reads: "Taking a promising premise and driving it straight into the sea, No Way Up doesn't have enough fun with its nerve-shredding concept."
