= Sheila Sim =

English actress (1922–2016)

The Right Honourable The Lady Attenborough
- Sim in 2004
- Born: Sheila Beryl Grant Sim; 5 June 1922; Liverpool, England
- Died: 19 January 2016 (aged 93); Northwood, London, England
- Resting place: St Mary Magdalene, Richmond, London
- Other name: Sheila Attenborough
- Years active: 1944–1959
- Spouse: Richard Attenborough (m. 1945; died 2014)
- Children: Michael Attenborough; Jane Attenborough; Charlotte Attenborough
- Relatives: Gerald Sim (brother); Tom Attenborough (grandson); Will Attenborough (grandson); Frederick Attenborough (father-in-law); David Attenborough (brother-in-law); John Attenborough (brother-in-law)

Sheila Beryl Grant Sim, Baroness Attenborough (5 June 1922 – 19 January 2016) was an English film and theatre actress. She was the wife of Richard Attenborough.

== Career ==
Sheila Beryl Grant Sim was born in Liverpool, Lancashire, only daughter of banker Stuart Grant Sim (1893–1975) and his wife Ida Isabel Carter, who were married in April 1920. Brought up at "Carnlea" overlooking Calderstones Park in Liverpool and later, 18 The Ridge at Purley in Surrey, Sim was privately educated before training at RADA. Sim was mainly active as an actress in the 1940s and 1950s. She appeared in the Powell and Pressburger film, A Canterbury Tale (1944); she acted alongside her husband in the Boulting brothers' The Guinea Pig (1948); and starred opposite Anthony Steel in West of Zanzibar (1954).

In theatre, she co-starred with her husband, Richard Attenborough, in the first cast of The Mousetrap by Agatha Christie, from its London premiere in 1952. Sim played the role of Mollie Ralston.

After recruitment by Noël Coward, Sim actively served the Actors' Charitable Trust for more than 60 years. She was instrumental in the success of two redevelopments of the actors' care home, Denville Hall, in the 1960s and 2000s, and was a Trustee and Vice-President of the charities.

Sim was a significant benefactor to the Royal Academy of Dramatic Art (RADA), where she originally trained; her husband was RADA's president from 2003 until he died in 2014.

== Family ==
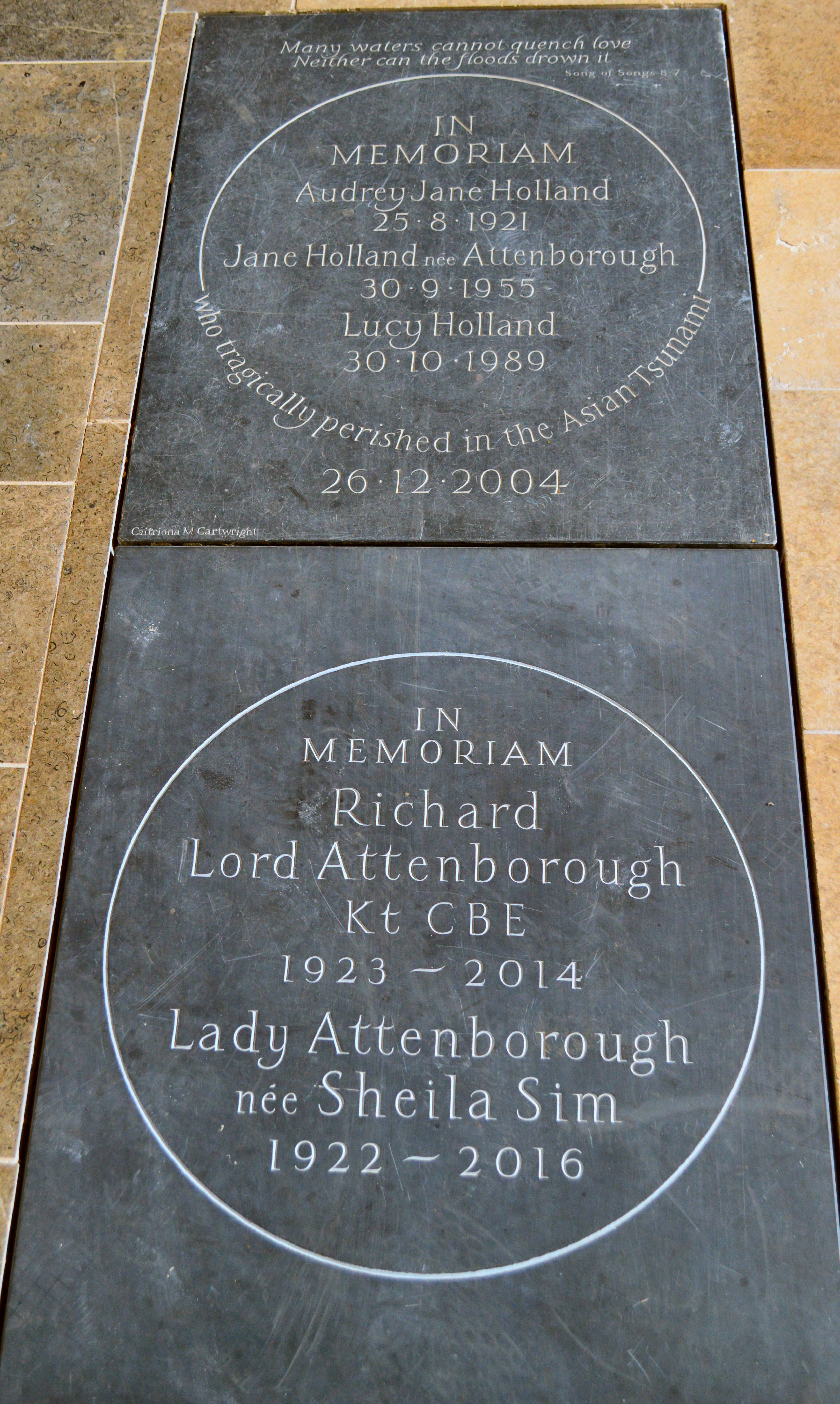
Markers for the graves of Richard Attenborough, Sheila Sim, their daughter Jane Holland and their granddaughter, Lucy, at St Mary Magdalene, Richmond.

Sim married Richard Attenborough on 22 January 1945 and they lived in a house on Richmond Green in London from 1956 until 2012, when her husband placed it for sale at £11.5 million.

The couple had three children, Michael (born 13 February 1950), Jane (30 September 1955 – 26 December 2004), and Charlotte (born 29 June 1959). Jane, along with her 15-year-old daughter, Lucy, and her mother-in-law, also named Jane, were killed in the Indian Ocean tsunami as it struck their villa on the coast of Thailand on 26 December 2004. Michael and Charlotte are both involved in the dramatic professions: he as a director, she as an actress. Sim's younger brother, Gerald, who died on 11 December 2014, was also an actor.

Richard Attenborough died on 24 August 2014. Sim and Attenborough had been married for 69 years.

== Illness and death ==
In June 2012, shortly before her 90th birthday, Sim entered the actors' retirement home Denville Hall, for which she and her husband had helped raise funds. In July 2012, while her husband Richard suffered health issues, Sim was diagnosed with senile dementia.

In March 2013, in the light of his deteriorating health, Richard moved into Denville Hall to be with his wife. Her younger brother Gerald likewise lived in Denville Hall until his death in December 2014.

Sim died on 19 January 2016 at Denville Hall. She was cremated and her ashes were interred in a vault at St Mary Magdalene church in Richmond beside those of her husband, as well as her daughter Jane Holland and her granddaughter, Lucy.

== In popular culture ==
Sim was portrayed by Pearl Chanda in the British-American film See How They Run (2022).

== Selected filmography ==
- A Canterbury Tale (1944)
- Great Day (1945)
- Dancing with Crime (1947)
- The Guinea Pig (1948)
- Dear Mr. Prohack (1949)
- Pandora and the Flying Dutchman (1951)
- The Magic Box (1951)
- West of Zanzibar (1954)
- The Night My Number Came Up (1955)
