= Attenborough Building =

Building in the University of Leicester, England

Coordinates: 52°37′16.5″N 1°7′26.4″W

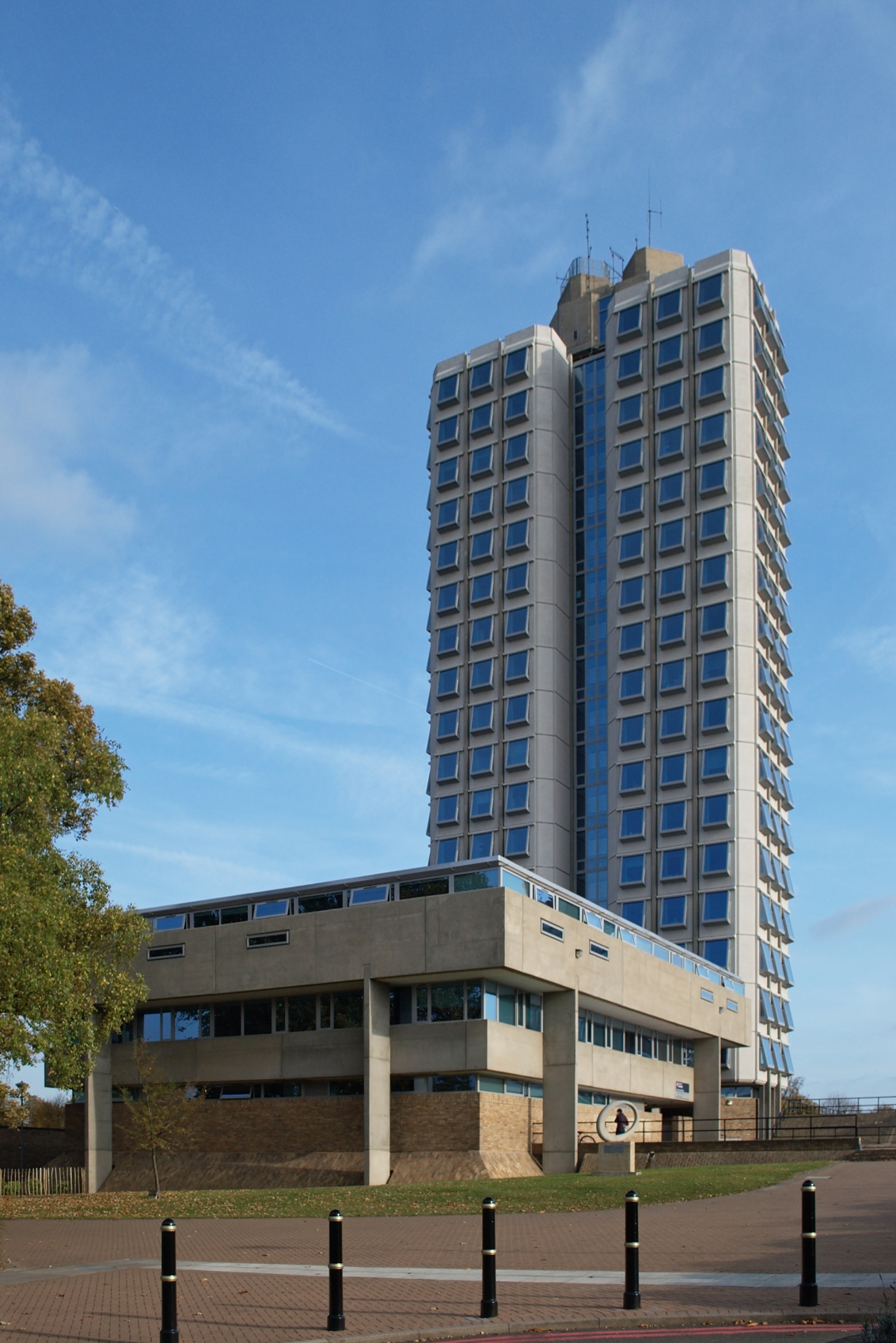
The Attenborough Tower with the seminar block in the foreground

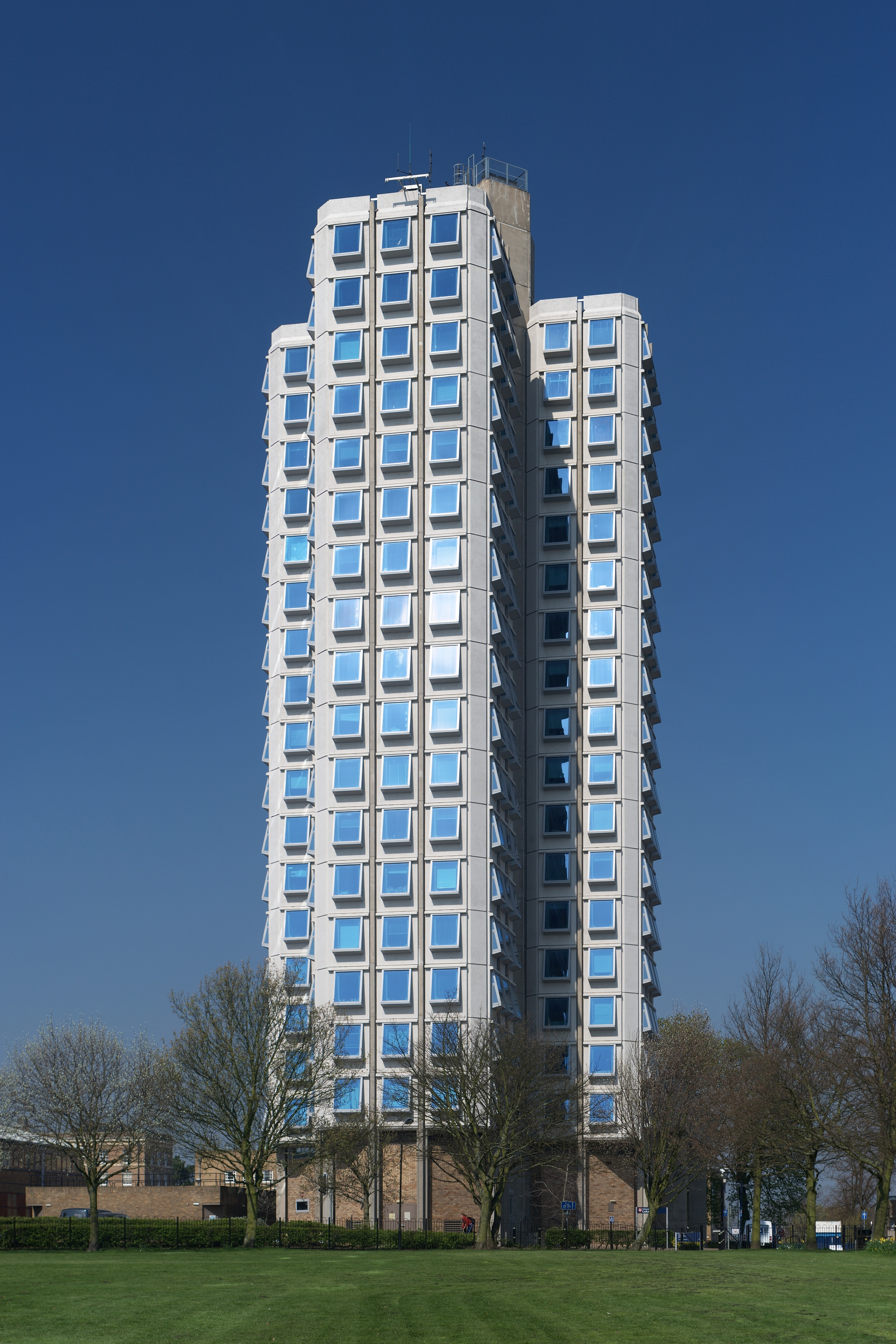
Attenborough Building

The Attenborough Building is the tallest building on the campus of the University of Leicester, and houses arts and humanities departments.

The building comprises three distinct elements: an 18-storey tower block containing 270 offices and tutorial rooms; a low-rise building, known within the University as the 'Attenborough Seminar Block', containing seminar rooms and computing facilities; and an underground area housing two large lecture theatres and the University Film Theatre.

It was designed by Arup Associates and constructed between 1968 and 1970, with Ove Arup as the chief engineers. The university's development plan at the time called for two other similar towers, but these were never built.

The building was named after Frederick Attenborough, who was principal of the then University College from 1932 until 1951, and father of Richard and David Attenborough. By the time of the opening ceremony Frederick was elderly and frail, so the building was opened on his behalf by his youngest son John.

The tower reaches a height of 52 metres, making it one of the tallest buildings in the city. It is constructed with a concrete frame, which was cast in situ, and clad with pre-cast concrete panels. Each floor consists of three leaves of space containing the offices. These are separated by the central lobby and service area, which contains a staircase and a lift. It was built with a paternoster lift, but this was closed in December 2017 as maintenance had become too expensive.

The University's hilltop location makes the top floor of the tower one of the best vantage points in the city, to the extent that the University have fixed a notice at the base of the tower warning tourists that it is not open for the public "to view the city from a height". The top floor currently houses offices for the research students of the School of Archaeology and Ancient History, and formerly contained music practice rooms, including a full-size grand piano, until it was moved out on 29 March 2007.

The seminar block includes the main entrance to the building. It is connected to the second floor of the tower by a covered bridge. It contains small teaching rooms on four levels, including one basement level. The block underwent significant refurbishment during the summer of 2005, including work to install a lift to make the building conform to the Disability Discrimination Act – previously, access to the different levels of the seminar block was by staircase only. While the base of the tower uses yellow-brown brick seen in other buildings on campus, the seminar block features a concrete finish that more closely matches Denys Lasdun's adjacent brutalist Charles Wilson Building.

In front of the main entrance is a raised piazza, beneath which are the subterranean lecture theatres. There are two lecture theatres, seating 204 and 96 people respectively. The third room was previously a proscenium theatre, and was used by the Leicester University Theatre (LUT) society for their performances. In 2003, the theatre was converted into the 144-seat University Film Theatre, featuring a projection screen and surround sound system, in preparation of the launch of a new Film Studies degree.

The building should not be confused with the Richard Attenborough Centre for Disability and the Arts, which is located on the opposite side of University Road, adjacent to the University's Medical Sciences Building.

== Trivia ==
Due to its unusual design, it has been compared by Leicester residents to a giant "cheese grater".

...eighteen monotonous storeys, prickly with window units angled out from top to bottom of the pre-cast concrete panels, a feature more successful inside than out.

— Nikolaus Pevsner
