= Gerald Sim =

English actor (1925–2014)

- Born: Gerald Grant Sim; 4 June 1925; Liverpool, England
- Died: 11 December 2014 (aged 89); Northwood, Hillingdon, London, England
- Occupation: Actor
- Years active: 1947–1996, 2007
- Spouse: Deidre Benner (m. 1967; died 1999)
- Relatives: Sheila Sim (sister); Michael Attenborough (nephew); Jane Attenborough (niece); Charlotte Attenborough (niece); Tom Attenborough (great nephew); Will Attenborough (great nephew); Richard Attenborough (brother-in-law)

Gerald Grant Sim (4 June 1925 – 11 December 2014) was an English television and film actor known for playing the Rector in To the Manor Born.

== Early life ==
Sim was born in Liverpool, Lancashire. He was the younger brother of the actress Sheila Sim and brother-in-law of the actor/director Richard Attenborough.

== Career ==
Sim made over a hundred film and television appearances, beginning with an uncredited role in the film Fame Is the Spur (1947). Film and TV roles include The L-Shaped Room (1962), Séance on a Wet Afternoon (1964), King Rat (1965), The Avengers (1966), Oh! What a Lovely War (1969), Ryan's Daughter (1970), Dr. Jekyll and Sister Hyde (1971), Frenzy (1972), Young Winston (1972), The Fall and Rise of Reginald Perrin (episode 7, as the Vicar - 1976), A Bridge Too Far (1977), The New Avengers (1977), Edward & Mrs. Simpson (1978), Gandhi (1982), as Dr George Bagster Phillips in Jack the Ripper (1988), Chaplin (1992) and Patriot Games (1992).

He again played a vicar in an episode of Keeping Up Appearances.

Although he had retired, he reprised his best-known role in the 2007 25th anniversary special episode of To the Manor Born.

== Personal life and death ==
Sim was married to the British actress Deidre Benner, from 1967 until her death in 1999. In his later years, Sim lived in Denville Hall, the same north London care home for entertainers as his sister and brother-in-law, who occupied the rooms on either side of him. Sim died on 11 December 2014, aged 89.

== Filmography ==
- Fame Is the Spur (1947) – Reporter (uncredited)
- Josephine and Men (1955) – Detective Sgt. Allen
- The Angry Silence (1960) – Masters
- Cone of Silence (1960) – Operations Room Worker (uncredited)
- Whistle Down the Wind (1961) – Detective Wilcox
- Flat Two (1962)
- Only Two Can Play (1962) – Cigarette Thief at Party (uncredited)
- The Painted Smile (1962) – Plain Clothes Policeman
- The Amorous Prawn (1962) – 1st Telephone Operator
- The L-Shaped Room (1962) – Doctor in Hospital
- The Wrong Arm of the Law (1963) – Airfield Official (uncredited)
- I Could Go On Singing (1963) – Assistant Mgr. at the Palladium
- Heavens Above! (1963) – Self-Service Store Manager
- The Pumpkin Eater (1964) – Man at party
- Séance on a Wet Afternoon (1964) – Beedle
- King Rat (1965) – Jones
- The Murder Game (1965) – Larry Landstorm
- The Wrong Box (1966) – First Undertaker
- The Whisperers (1967) – Mr. Conrad
- Our Mother's House (1967) – Bank Clerk
- Nobody Runs Forever (1968) – Airport Official (uncredited)
- Oh! What a Lovely War (1969) – Chaplain
- Strange Report (TV) (1969) – Chief Superintendent Cavanagh
- The Madwoman of Chaillot (1969) – Julius
- Mischief (1969) – Jim
- The Man Who Haunted Himself (1970) – Morrison
- The Last Grenade (1970) – Dr. Griffiths (uncredited)
- Doctor in Trouble (1970) – 1st Doctor
- Ryan's Daughter (1970) – Captain
- The Raging Moon (1971) – Rev. Carbett
- Dr. Jekyll and Sister Hyde (1971) – Prof. Robertson
- Frenzy (1972) – Mr. Usher – Solicitor in Pub
- Dr. Phibes Rises Again (1972) – Hackett
- Young Winston (1972) – Engineer
- Kadoyng (1972) – Prof. Balfour
- No Sex Please, We're British (1973) – Reverend Mower
- The Slipper and the Rose: The Story of Cinderella (1976) – 1st Lord of the Navy
- A Bridge Too Far (1977) – Colonel Sims
- Gandhi (1982) – Magistrate
- Miss Marple (1985) – Coroner
- Cry Freedom (1987) – Police Doctor
- Number One Gun (1990) – Stockwell – MI5 Boss
- Patriot Games (1992) – Lord Justice
- Chaplin (1992) – Doctor
- Shadowlands (1993) – Superintendent Registrar
