= Making News =

- Genre: Drama
- Country of origin: United Kingdom
- Original language: English
- No. of series: 1
- No. of episodes: 6

Production
- Running time: 50 minutes
- Production company: Thames Television

Original release
- Network: ITV
- Release: 16 January – 19 February 1990

Making News is a British television drama set in the world of journalism produced by Thames Television for the ITV network, and that originally aired between 16 January to 19 February 1990.

A pilot episode, entitled 'Making News', was originally screened on 9 May 1989 as part of Thames' anthology series Storyboard. The pilot was developed into a series of six episodes transmitted the following year.

== Cast ==
- Clive Arrindell as Alex Hendry
- Tom Cotcher as Eddie Fraser
- Bill Nighy as Sam Courtney
- Gawn Grainger as Pelham Beecher
- Paul Darrow as George Parnell
- Nichola McAuliffe as Carrie Vernon
- Annie Lambert as Jill Wycombe
- Alphonsia Emmanuel as Anita Markham
- Tony Osoba as Freddie
- Ian Bleasdale as Ron
- Charlotte Attenborough as Lucy Trent
- Derek Benfield as Philip Baxter

== Episode list ==
No.	Title	Directed by	Written by	Original release date
1	"Doing Time"	William Brayne	Michael Aitkens	16 January 1990
2	"The Border Limo"	Herbert Wise	Keith Dewhurst	23 January 1990
3	"Conspiracy"	Graham Theakston	Michael Aitkens	30 January 1990
4	"Line of Fire"	Terry Marcel	Brian Finch	5 February 1990
5	"Three Kinds of Poison"	Sharon Miller	Alan Smithie	12 February 1990
6	"Yes, We Have No Secrets"	William Brayne	Kieran Prendiville	19 February 1990
