= May We Borrow Your Husband? (film) =

1986 British television film adapted from a Graham Greene short story

- Genre: Comedy-drama
- Based on: "May We Borrow Your Husband?" by Graham Greene
- Written by: Dirk Bogarde
- Directed by: Bob Mahoney
- Starring: Dirk Bogarde; Charlotte Attenborough; Simon Shepherd; David Yelland
- Composers: Joe Campbell; Paul Hart
- Country of origin: United Kingdom
- Original language: English

Production
- Executive producer: David Cunliffe
- Producer: Keith Richardson
- Cinematography: Peter Jackson
- Editor: Tim Ritson
- Running time: 102 minutes
- Production company: Yorkshire Television

Original release
- Network: ITV
- Release: 23 November 1986

May We Borrow Your Husband? is a British television film produced in 1986. Adapted from the short story by Graham Greene, the film was written by Dirk Bogarde and directed by Bob Mahoney. It originally aired on ITV on 23 November 1986 and featured an ensemble cast including Bogarde, Charlotte Attenborough, Simon Shepherd, and David Yelland.

== Plot ==
"May We Borrow Your Husband?" is the title story of a collection Graham Greene termed "comedies of the sexual life." The narrative, a comedy of manners, scrutinizes the lifestyles of a particular class of English society. The protagonist, William Harris, serves as both a detached observer and reluctant participant in the unfolding drama.

== Cast ==
- Dirk Bogarde as William Harris
- Charlotte Attenborough as Poopy Travis
- Simon Shepherd as Peter Travis
- David Yelland as Tony
- Francis Matthews as Stephen
- Patricia Davidson as English woman
- Randal Herley as Mr. Ratcliffe
- Claude Coppola as barman
- Jacques Diez as maitre d'hotel
- Eric Galliano as porter

== Production ==
The film was produced by Keith Richardson for Yorkshire Television, with editing by Tim Ritson and cinematography by Peter Jackson. The music was composed by Joe Campbell and Paul Hart, adding a subtle layer to the film’s comedic and dramatic tones.

== Reception ==
Upon its release, May We Borrow Your Husband? received mixed reviews. Some critics praised the performances, particularly that of Dirk Bogarde, while others felt the adaptation lacked the wit and charm of Greene's original story.
