= Musical Futures =

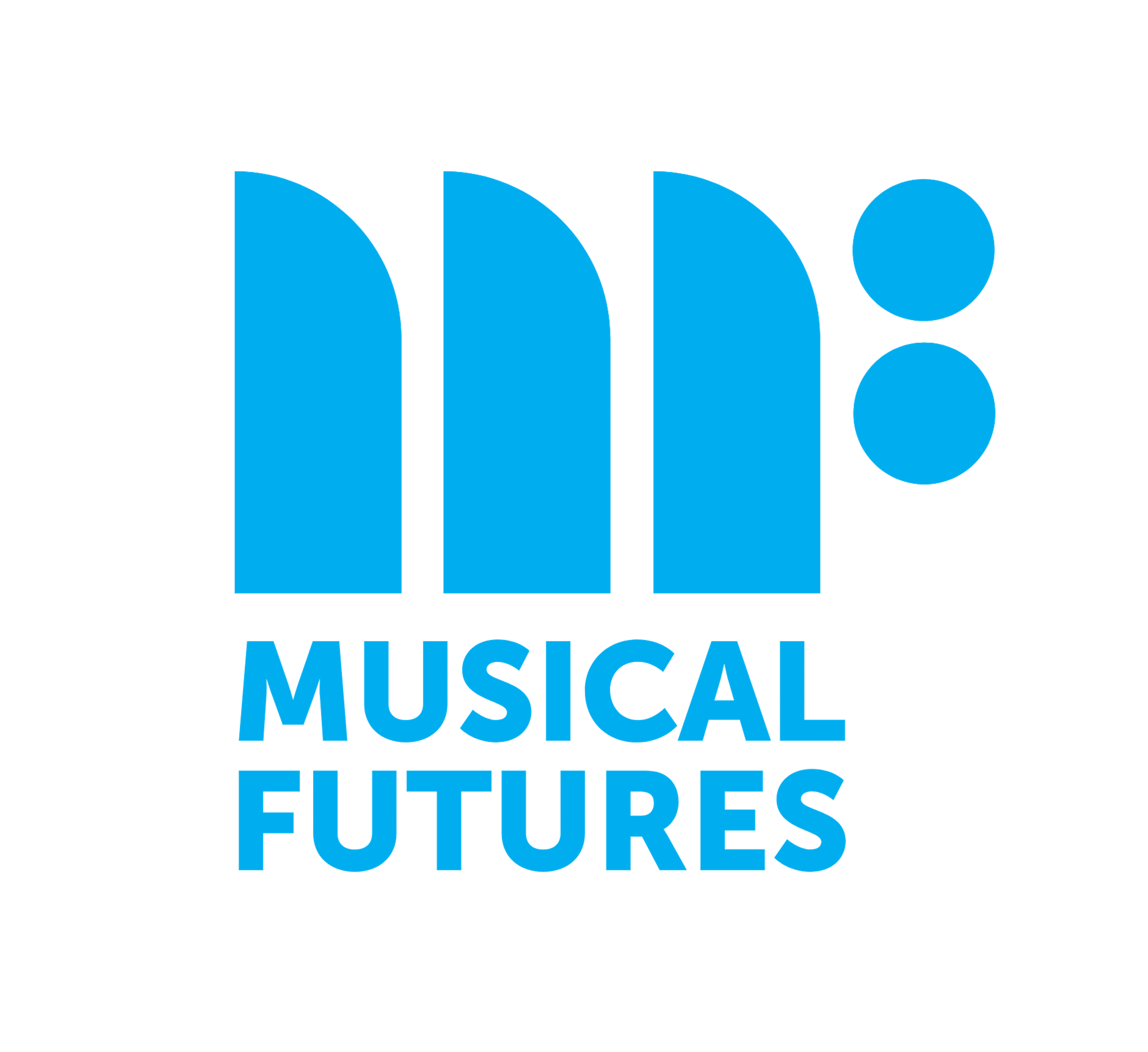
Musical Futures logo

Musical Futures is a not-for-profit music education program, pedagogy and resource platform built for teachers, children and youths. It was started in the United Kingdom in 2003 by the Paul Hamlyn Foundation and is now an internationally recognised enterprise.

== Background ==
Musical Futures originated in the United Kingdom in 2003 as an initiative of the Paul Hamlyn Foundation, an independent grant-making organisation that sought new and imaginative ways to engage young people aged 11 to 18 in meaningful music-making. The project began with a year of national consultation followed by two years of “Pathfinder” action-research projects in Leeds, Nottingham and Hertfordshire. These pilots, involving schools, music services, universities and community organisations, explored informal and participatory approaches to learning music that reflected how many young people engage with music outside school.

By 2006, the first set of teacher resources and case studies was published and made freely available, leading to widespread adoption across UK schools. Musical Futures later expanded internationally, with programmes and professional learning delivered in Australia, New Zealand and parts of Asia through Musical Futures International (MFI), which was established to support teachers globally.

In 2018, Musical Futures was recognised by the education organisation HundrED as one of the world’s Top 100 Global Education Innovations.

== Musical Futures International – Online Platform ==
In 2024, Musical Futures International launched a new online subscription platform for its teaching and learning resources. The platform consolidated previous URL-based access into one system from April 2025. It includes core units such as Just Play, Everyone Can Play, Play Now, Beats (including Styles & Groove), and Recreate for electronic music production in multiple DAWs. The subscription model offers tiered options including Starter Pack, Build Your Own and Full Access.

== Musical Futures Online ==
In January 2021, Musical Futures UK unveiled their new resource platform, Musical Futures Online. The subscription-based website contains thousands of audio & visual learning resources built for classroom and home use. Teachers and music professionals can subscribe to the platform though any of the 3 membership plans, Standard (ideal for Primary teaching), Premium (ideal for Primary & Secondary teaching) and Ultimate (ideal for Secondary teaching with technology).

The platform features a wide range of resources to support teachers in delivering music from ages 7 – 16 (Key Stages 2 – 4 in the UK). All resources are developed, tested and refined by teachers and practitioners in their own settings.

=== Resource Categories ===
- LearnToPlay - Whole-class music making for popular classroom instruments including ukulele, guitar, keyboard and tuned percussion
- LearnToPlay Songbook - Library of popular feel-good songs featuring how-to-play videos. Available for guitar, keyboard, ukulele and tuned percussion
- MakingMusic - Features four teaching resources designed to develop core musical skills that help create a solid foundation upon which to build
  - Body Percussion
  - Untuned Percussion
  - Classroom Collection
  - ChairDrumming
  - SimplySamba
- Find Your Voice - An engaging approach to vocal work in the classroom. Suitable for all ages, this collection includes: Warm-ups, group games, vocal exercises, beatboxing & tasks using mobile technology
- JustPlay - Musical Futures' most popular resource, JustPlay provides whole-class music making opportunities for popular classroom instruments. Includes video guides that combines ukulele, guitar, bass, keyboard and vocals in one resource
- Playalong Library - Follows JustPlay. A library of video playalongs for 80+ songs including pop music, selected music by exam boards, film music and more. Search by difficulty or genre
- Music Production - Comprehensive video tutorials and resources to help students produce a trap track using the web-based sequencer BandLab
  - Intro course
  - Advanced course
- InsideRap - Created especially for Musical Futures by a performing rap artist, this resource offers the support for learners to create an authentic piece of rap music
- In The Style Of - Series of downloadable audio sample packs in the style of various World-famous artists with a series of tasks to create a remix
- Serato DJ Course - Created in collaboration with Education & Bass, this resource uses the free Serato DJ lite software and shows how student can DJ with a series of video tutorials

== Learning models ==
=== Informal learning in the music classroom ===
Lucy Green, the Institute of Education and Hertfordshire Music Service developed a self-directed, independent learning music education program. Students work in small groups on a series of musical tasks. This draws on the real-life learning practices of professional musicians.

=== Whole curriculum approach ===
Nottingham City Music Service developed a program for Year 7-8 students. It puts the students in real musical activities and environments. It aims to draw together practice from classroom, instrumental and extra-curricular music into an integrated package for students.

=== Personalising extra-curricular learning ===
Education Leeds Artforms created a program to help young people to make choices about the music they engage with beyond the classroom.

== Recent Developments ==
Following its international expansion, Musical Futures International (MFI) has continued to develop classroom resources and professional-learning opportunities for music teachers across Australia, Asia and other regions. During the early 2020s, MFI increased its focus on digital access and teacher training through blended online and in-person workshops.

In 2024, MFI launched a redesigned online subscription platform consolidating its teaching resources into a single digital system. The platform includes expanded versions of the *Just Play* and *Everyone Can Play* programmes, new projects such as *Play Now*, *Express Yourself Hip-Hop Songwriting*, and *Recreate*—an electronic-music unit supporting creativity in digital audio workstations (DAWs).

Since 2023, MFI has also explored the role of artificial intelligence in music education through initiatives such as the “AI Artist Coach” tools and electronic-music pedagogy projects, which integrate AI-assisted creativity and student-centred learning.

Musical Futures International continues to collaborate with education partners, universities, and industry organisations to deliver workshops, conferences and student music festivals in the Asia-Pacific region.
