= Jane Attenborough =

English arts administrator and manager (1955–2004)

The Honourable Jane Attenborough
- Born: Jane Mary Attenborough; 30 September 1955; London, England
- Died: 26 December 2004 (aged 49); Khao Lak Beach, Thailand
- Cause of death: 2004 Indian Ocean earthquake and tsunami
- Education: Lady Eleanor Holles School; University of Sussex
- Occupations: Arts administrator, arts manager
- Years active: 1977–2004
- Spouse: Michael Holland (m. 1982)
- Children: 3
- Parents: Richard Attenborough (father); Sheila Sim (mother)
- Family: Michael Attenborough (brother); Charlotte Attenborough (sister); Frederick Attenborough (grandfather); David Attenborough (uncle); John Attenborough (uncle); Gerald Sim (uncle); Tom Attenborough (nephew); Will Attenborough (nephew)

Jane Mary Attenborough (30 September 1955 – 26 December 2004) was an English arts administrator and arts manager. The eldest daughter of the actor and filmmaker Richard Attenborough and the actress Sheila Sim, she began her career as overseas membership secretary at the Royal Academy of Dance. Attenborough later worked for the Arts Council of Great Britain in its national touring programme before moving to the Rambert Dance Company as dance liaison officer, expanding its education programme from schools activities to local community events.

She died together with her daughter Lucy and mother-in-law in the Indian Ocean earthquake and tsunami while holidaying in Thailand on 26 December 2004.

== Early life and education ==
Jane Mary Attenborough was born on 30 September 1955 in London. She was the eldest daughter of the actor and filmmaker Richard Attenborough and the actress Sheila Sim. Attenborough had two siblings: Michael and Charlotte. From her childhood, Attenborough was raised amongst people from the artistic world and she was focused on addressing a concern that many individuals lacked an opportunity to participate in the arts. Attenborough was educated at the Lady Eleanor Holles School in Hampton, before going on to enroll on a sociology course at the University of Sussex from 1973 to 1976.

== Career ==
Attenborough's first job was as overseas membership secretary at the Royal Academy of Dance for a short time in 1977. She subsequently joined the Arts Council of Great Britain and was assigned to its national touring programme, where she assisted consultant Jodi Myers. In 1979, she joined the Rambert Dance Company as dance liaison officer, where she expanded its education programme from traditional schools activities to encompass local community events. From 1980 to 1985 she was the press and public relations officer.

In 1985, Attenborough became administrator for the National Organisation for Dance and Mime (later Dance UK). She later became Dance UK's executive director, and contributed to the promotion of dance and improving conditions for dancers. She was involved in the development of was the Healthier Dancer Programme to help dancers maintain their fitness and reduce the risk of injury. She also helped to establish the Digital Dance Awards in 1987, which allowed companies and choreographers to produce works which would otherwise be beyond their financial means. In early 2000, she joined the Paul Hamlyn Foundation as arts manager. She was involved in projects that introduced "at risk" individuals to the arts, including in prisons.

Attenborough was involved in the promotion of music education in schools in North East England and she led the Paul Hamlyn Performances at the Royal Opera House, introducing thousands of young people to opera. She helped the foundation establish links with the Royal National Theatre, the Royal Court Theatre and the Sage Gateshead. She undertook other projects to provide audiences with opportunities to get involved in the arts. In her final years, Attenborough was manager of the experimental Musical Futures project, working with the civil servant Claus Moser and project leader David Price.

== Personal life ==
Attenborough married Michael Holland in 1982. They had three children, Sam, Alice and Lucy.

== Death ==
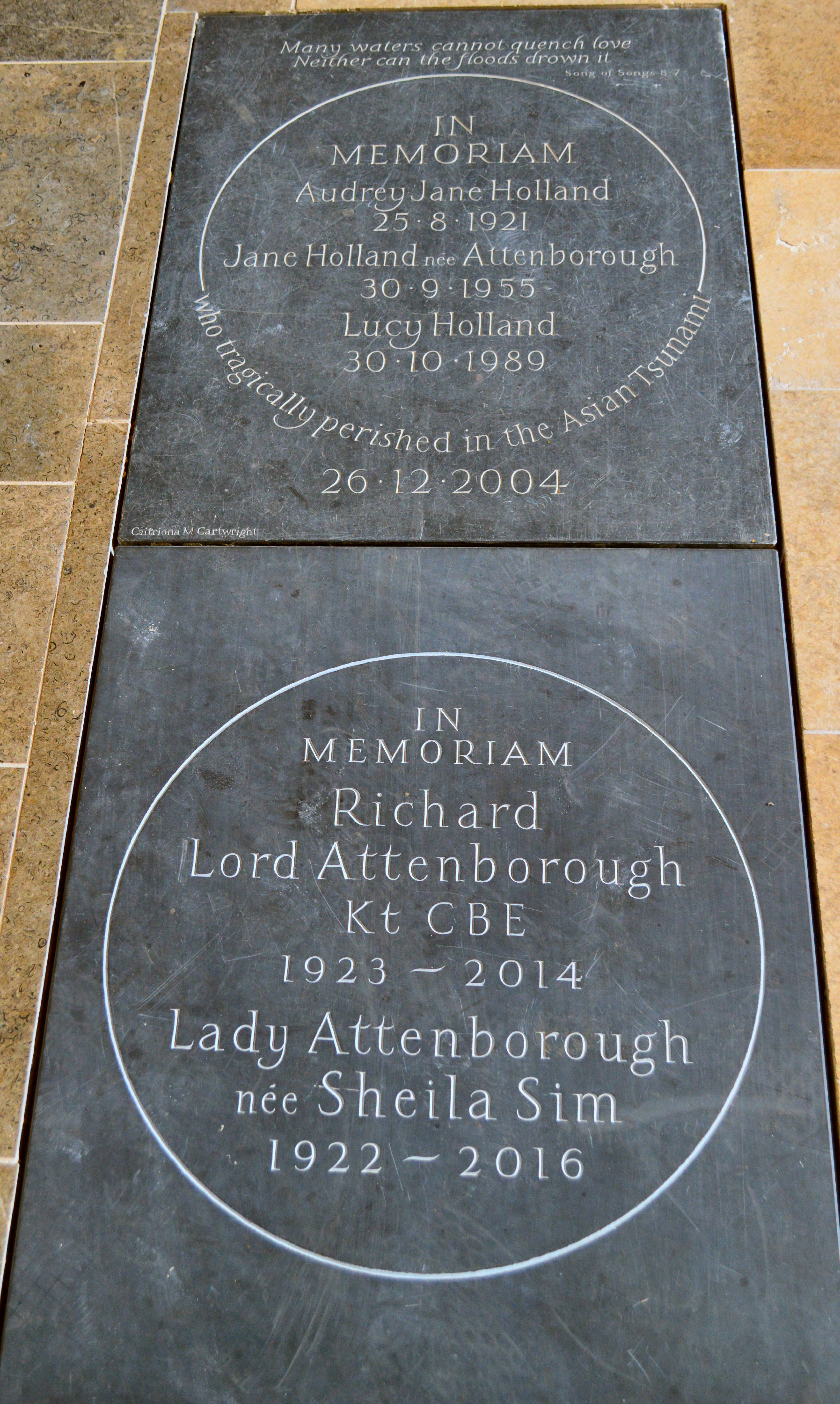
Markers for the graves of Richard Attenborough, Sheila Sim, their daughter Jane Holland, and their granddaughter, Lucy, at St Mary Magdalene, Richmond.

On the morning of 26 December 2004, Attenborough and her family were holidaying on Khao Lak Beach in Thailand when the Indian Ocean earthquake and tsunami struck their villa, killing her, her 15-year-old daughter Lucy, and her 81-year-old mother-in-law, Audrey Holland. The 2004 Indian Ocean tsunami, one of the deadliest natural disasters in recorded history, claimed over 230,000 lives across multiple countries, including Thailand. Her husband Michael Holland and two other children survived. She was 49 when she died. Her death, alongside that of her daughter and mother-in-law, was widely covered in the British press, given her contributions to the arts and her family's public profile.

In March 2005, a memorial service was held at Southwark Cathedral, attended by her family, friends and colleagues. Attenborough's brother Michael described her, in his eulogy, as "intense". In an obituary for the Guardian, Moser called her an individual who had a "generous spirit, integrity, wisdom and involvement". In an obituary in The Independent, Myers noted her "infectious sense of humour" and "great charm". She had an ability to put individuals from diverse backgrounds at ease, and combined "great enthusiasm and passion with impressive administrative skills and acute sensitivity to the needs of artists and audiences."

== Legacy ==
The Musical Features project, of which she was manager, expanded operations outside of the United Kingdom and involving more than one million young people. Dance UK established the Jane Attenborough One Dance UK Industry Award in recognition of "an individual working in dance who has made an outstanding contribution to the art form." In 2011, the winner of this award was Gill Clarke. From 2005 to 2009, the Paul Hamlyn Foundation honoured Attenborough with the two-year £50,000 Jane Attenborough Dance in Education Fellowship, which aimed "to enable a dance company to provide practical assistance, mentoring and training to help a dancer coming to the end of his or her career to make a successful transition to education and community work."

The Paul Hamlyn Foundation also funded the construction of a drama and music facility, the Jane Holland Creative Centre for Learning at Waterford Kamhlaba in Eswatini, which was opened by Lord and Lady Attenborough in November 2006 in honour of their eldest daughter. Her alma mater, the University of Sussex, named a small studio in the Attenborough Centre for the Creative Arts after her in 2015.
