= Tom Attenborough =

English voice actor and theatre director (born 1986)

- Born: Thomas Frederick Richard Attenborough; 13 October 1986 (age 39); London, England
- Education: St Paul's School; Trinity College, Cambridge
- Occupations: Voice actor, theatre director, teacher
- Years active: 1989–present
- Father: Michael Attenborough
- Relatives: Will Attenborough (brother); Richard Attenborough (grandfather); Sheila Sim (grandmother); Frederick Attenborough (great-grandfather); Jane Attenborough (aunt); Charlotte Attenborough (aunt); David Attenborough (great uncle); John Attenborough (great uncle); Gerald Sim (great uncle)

Thomas Frederick Richard Attenborough (born 13 October 1986) is an English voice actor and theatre director. He is the son of theatre director Michael Attenborough, grandson of the late film actor and director Richard Attenborough and the great nephew of broadcaster and naturalist David Attenborough.

== Life ==
Born in October 1986, the elder of two sons of Michael Attenborough and Karen Lewis. In 2011, he won a runner-up prize for the JMK Award, and in 2012, was made an Associate Artist of HighTide Festival Theatre. In 2016, he became associate director of the Watermill Theatre, Newbury.

== Career ==
=== Voice acting ===
His career began as a voiceover artist. He voiced Christopher Robin in The Tigger Movie, Max in Max on the Moon and Harry Potter in the Harry Potter video games.

=== Directing ===
Attenborough works as a freelance theatre director in and around London. His first job was as an assistant director to Rachel Chavkin on The American Capitalism Project. Since then his career has included work at the National Theatre, the Minerva Theatre Chichester, the Almeida Theatre, MCS Oxford, The Old Vic, the Menier Chocolate Factory, the Hampstead Theatre, Theatre Royal Bath and the West End. Early productions included The Shape of Things by Neil LaBute at The Gallery Soho in London, and the regional premiere of The Mountaintop by Katori Hall for Derby LIVE.

Rhapsody of Words presented a revival of Conor McPherson's play Port Authority at the Southwark Playhouse, starring Ardal O'Hanlon, John Rogan, and Andrew Nolan in 2012. They then produced Rashid Razaq's new play, The President and the Pakistani, at the Waterloo East Theatre. Both productions were directed by Attenborough. He directed Sleeping Trees’ production of Cinderella and the Beanstalk, the world's first 3-man family pantomime, at Theatre503, which premiered in December 2014 and returned in 2015 to sell-out audiences and great critical acclaim.

Attenborough directed a new play by Rob Hayes, Step 9 (of 12), starring Blake Harrison, at London's Trafalgar Studios in May 2012. He directed revivals of Abigail's Party and Noises Off, both of which toured the UK in the first half of 2013. In 2015, Attenborough directed Morgan Lloyd Malcolm's new play The Wasp at the Hampstead Theatre Downstairs, starring Sinead Matthews and MyAnna Buring. He also had hits with The Whipping Man at Theatre Royal Plymouth and the Pulitzer Prize-winning Dinner with Friends at Park Theatre.

The Wasp transferred to the West End in 2016, with Buring reprising her role opposite Laura Donnelly. In 2016, Attenborough also directed a major UK tour of Noël Coward's Private Lives, as well as the regional premiere of Untold Stories by Alan Bennett.

In March 2017, Attenborough directed the West End debut of Tony Award winner Stephen Karam's play Speech and Debate at London's Trafalgar Studios.

He works as an English teacher at King’s College School, Wimbledon.

== Filmography ==
=== Film ===
Year	Title	Voice role	Notes
2000	The Tigger Movie	Christopher Robin	

=== Video games ===
Year	Title	Voice role	Notes
1999	Max on the Moon	Max	
2002	Harry Potter and the Chamber of Secrets	Harry Potter, George Weasley	
2004	Harry Potter and the Prisoner of Azkaban	Harry Potter, George Weasley	
