= Will Attenborough =

English actor and climate campaigner (born 1991)

- Born: William Attenborough; 26 June 1991 (age 35); Hammersmith, London, England
- Education: Queens' College, Cambridge
- Occupations: Actor; climate campaigner
- Years active: 1998–present
- Father: Michael Attenborough
- Relatives: Tom Attenborough (brother); Richard Attenborough (grandfather); Sheila Sim (grandmother); Frederick Attenborough (great-grandfather); Jane Attenborough (aunt); Charlotte Attenborough (aunt); David Attenborough (great-uncle); John Attenborough (great-uncle); Gerald Sim (great-uncle)

William Attenborough (born 26 June 1991) is an English actor and climate campaigner.

== Early life ==
Attenborough was born in Hammersmith, London. He is the son of theatre director Michael Attenborough and actress Karen Lewis, the grandson of actor-director Richard Attenborough and actress Sheila Sim, as well as great-nephew of naturalist Sir David Attenborough.

He is Jewish. His great-grandparents also adopted two Jewish refugee girls from the 1938-39 Kindertransport.

On 26 December 2004, his aunt Jane Holland and 15-year-old cousin, Lucy, were killed in the 2004 Indian Ocean tsunami.

== Career ==
Attenborough played the lead role in Jeremy Herrin's production of Another Country in the West End, and starred opposite Nicole Kidman onstage in Photograph 51. He has had roles in Sam Mendes-produced The Hollow Crown, Channel 4's Utopia, Home Fires, Denial starring Rachel Weisz, and the Oscar-winning Dunkirk.

Attenborough won The Moth London Grandslam in 2018. In 2019, he played Ed Faulkner in The Outpost, based on Jake Tapper's book on the war in Afghanistan. He stars in BBC One's Our Girl as Oliver Hurst.

As a campaigner for 350.org, Attenborough helped secure mayor of London Sadiq Khan's commitment to shift City Hall's £5bn pension fund out of fossil fuel investments. Attenborough also launched a campaign with actors Leila Mimmack and Mark Rylance that successfully moved Equity's pension investments out of fossil fuels and into clean energy.

In 2023, he co-founded the Green Rider campaign, which enables actors and film workers to take action on climate change within the screen industry.

== Personal life ==
Attenborough identifies as queer.

== Filmography ==
=== Film ===
Year	Title	Role	Notes
2003	Kaena: The Prophecy	Sambo	English version; voice
2016	Denial	Thomas Skelton-Robinson	
2017	Dunkirk	Second Lieutenant	
2018	Hunter Killer	Kaplan	
2018	Where Hands Touch	Gunter	
2019	The Outpost	PV1 Ed Faulkner	
2024	Touchdown	Jerry	
2024	No Way Up	Kyle	

=== Television ===
Year	Title	Role	Notes
1998	Holding the Baby	Josh	Episode: "Au revoir l'amour"
2012	The Hollow Crown	Gloucester	2 episodes
2014	In the Flesh	William Smith	Episode #2.2
2014	Utopia	Ben	Episode #2.3
2015	Father Brown	Jacob Francis	Episode: "The Time Machine"
2015	Midwinter of the Spirit	James Lydon	3 episodes
2015	You, Me and the Apocalypse	Bobby Jr.	Episode: "What Happens to Idiots"
2015–2016	Home Fires	David Brindsley	8 episodes
2016	War & Peace	Artillery Officer	Episode #1.5
2016	Post Coital	Hal	6 episodes
2017–2018	Major Crimes	Dylan / Carl	4 episodes
2020	Our Girl	2nd Lt. Hurst	6 episodes
2023	The Diplomat	Stuart Baron	1 episode
2025	Outrageous	Joss	6 episodes
