= Frederick Attenborough =

English academic (1887–1973)

- Born: Frederick Levi Attenborough; 4 April 1887; Stapleford, Nottinghamshire, England
- Died: 20 March 1973 (aged 85); Wandsworth, South London, England
- Education: Emmanuel College, Cambridge Normal College, Bangor
- Occupation: Academic
- Years active: 1913–1960s
- Spouse: Mary Clegg (m. 1922; died 1961)
- Children: Richard; David; John
- Relatives: Michael Attenborough (grandson); Jane Attenborough (granddaughter); Charlotte Attenborough (granddaughter); Tom Attenborough (great-grandson); Will Attenborough (great-grandson)

Frederick Levi Attenborough (/ˈætənbərə/ AT-ən-bər-ə; 4 April 1887 – 20 March 1973) was an English academic and principal of University College, Leicester.

== Biography ==
He was the son of Mary (née Saxton) and Frederick August Attenborough of Stapleford, Nottinghamshire. His parents were devout Methodists. He was educated at schools in Long Eaton, Derbyshire. He became a teacher at the Long Eaton Higher Elementary School in 1913. The school was founded by Samuel Clegg, the headmaster, in 1910. He married the headmaster's daughter, Mary Clegg, in 1922.

In 1915, he attended Emmanuel College, Cambridge, as a Foundation Scholar and Choral Exhibitioner, and gained a first class degree in the Modern and Medieval Languages Tripos. From 1918 to 1920, he was a research student, and a fellow from 1920 to 1925. While a fellow, he published an edition and translation of the earliest English law-codes.

From 1925 to 1932, Attenborough was principal of the Borough Road Training College in Isleworth (which became the West London Institute of Higher Education in 1976).

Attenborough was principal of University College, Leicester from 1932 to 1951, and lived with his family on campus in College House (which now houses part of the university's Mathematics department).

Just prior to the Second World War, the Attenboroughs took in two Kindertransport Jewish refugee children, a pair of sisters, Irene Goldschmitt (married name) and Helga Waldmann (married name) who lived with them in College House. One of them encouraged his son David's fascination with the natural world by giving him a piece of amber.

Attenborough was an accomplished photographer. "The Leaves of Southwell" by Nikolaus Pevsner was published in 1945 with photographs by Attenborough of the carvings in the Chapter House of Southwell Minster in Nottinghamshire.

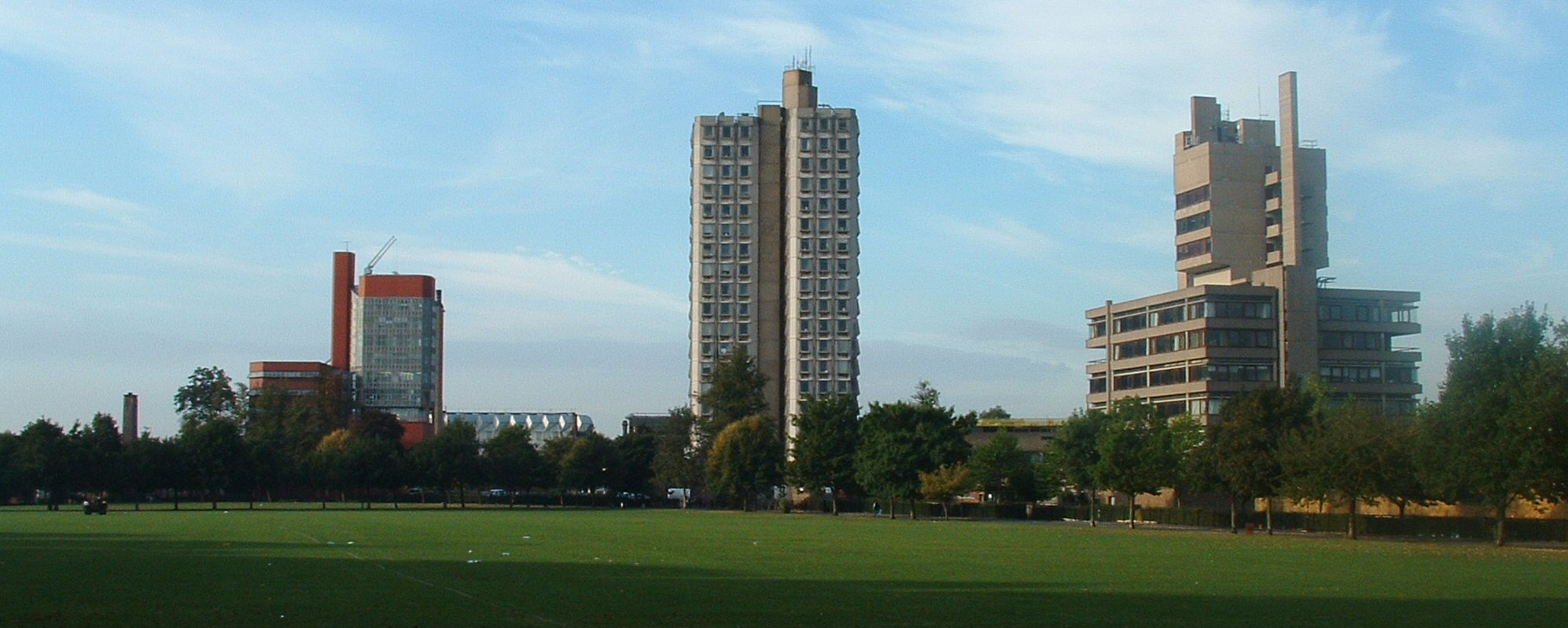
The University of Leicester, with the Attenborough building in the centre

Under Attenborough's guidance, the University College grew in size and reputation and eventually became the University of Leicester, receiving its royal charter in 1957.

The university's Attenborough Building, which includes an 18-storey tower and is the tallest building on the campus, was named in his honour. The building was opened in 1970. Attenborough was by this stage quite frail, so the building was opened on his behalf by his youngest son John.

Attenborough died in Wandsworth on 20 March 1973, at the age of 85.

== Family ==
He was married to Mary Clegg, of New Sawley, from 1922 until her death in 1961. They had three sons:

- Richard Samuel Attenborough (1923–2014), Lord Attenborough, the actor and director
- David Frederick Attenborough (born 1926), now Sir David, the TV naturalist
- John Michael Attenborough (1928–2012), Executive at Alfa Romeo
