= Charlotte Attenborough =

English actress (born 1959)

The Honourable Charlotte Attenborough
- Born: Charlotte Isabel Attenborough; 1959 (age 66–67)
- Occupation: Actress
- Years active: 1961–1998
- Spouse: Graham Sinclair (m. 1993; died 2021)
- Children: 2
- Parents: Richard Attenborough (father); Sheila Sim (mother)
- Relatives: Michael Attenborough (brother); Jane Attenborough (sister); Frederick Attenborough (grandfather); David Attenborough (uncle); John Attenborough (uncle); Gerald Sim (uncle); Tom Attenborough (nephew); Will Attenborough (nephew)

Charlotte Isabel Attenborough (born 1959) is an English stage, film and television actress known for her appearances in Jane Eyre (1996) and Jeeves and Wooster (1991, 1993). She is the daughter of Richard Attenborough and Sheila Sim.

== Early life and education ==
Charlotte Isabel Attenborough was born in 1959, the daughter of actor, filmmaker, entrepreneur, and politician Richard Attenborough, Baron Attenborough, and the film and theatre actress Sheila Sim.

She has one brother, director Michael Attenborough. Her sister Jane and her 15-year-old niece Lucy were killed in the Indian Ocean tsunami as it struck their villa on the coast of Thailand on 26 December 2004. Another niece, Alice, was seriously injured.

Charlotte Attenborough is the niece of television naturalist Sir David Attenborough, John Attenborough and actor Gerald Sim.

== Career ==
Attenborough had an uncredited role as a small child in the crowd in Whistle Down the Wind (1961) and made a brief cameo appearance in Oh! What a Lovely War (1969) when she was directed by her father Richard Attenborough. Charlotte Attenborough was educated at Lady Eleanor Holles School in London and the University of Bristol before training at the Royal Academy of Dramatic Art (RADA) like her father before her, from where she left with an Acting Diploma in 1983.

Her film roles include Ezekiel (1994) and Mary Rivers in Jane Eyre (1996), while television roles include Poopy Travis in May We Borrow Your Husband? (1986); Teasel in The Play on One (1989); Lucy in Storyboard (1989); Lucy Trent in Making News (1990); Verity in The Ruth Rendell Mysteries (1991); Margaret Froelich in Sherlock Holmes and the Leading Lady (1991); Stiffy Byng in Jeeves and Wooster (1991–1993); Prime Minister's Secretary in Screen One (1995) and Clinic Manager in Ultraviolet (1998).

In 1987 she appeared as Sheila Birling in a production of An Inspector Calls at Theatr Clwyd, which transferred to London's Westminster Theatre. In 1989 she played Lucie Manette in an adaptation of A Tale of Two Cities for BBC Radio 4.

== Personal life ==
In 1993, Attenborough married actor Graham Sinclair, with whom she had two children. Graham Sinclair died on 24 June 2021.

== Filmography ==
=== Film ===
Year	Film	Role	Notes
1961	Whistle Down the Wind	Child in Final Crowd Scene	Uncredited
1969	Oh! What a Lovely War	Emma Smith – Age 8	Uncredited
1986	May We Borrow Your Husband?	Poopy Travis	TV film
1991	Sherlock Holmes and the Leading Lady	Margaret Froelich	TV film
1996	Jane Eyre	Mary Rivers	

=== Television ===
Year	Film	Role	Notes
1989	The Play on One	Teasel	Episode: "These Foolish Things"
1989	Storyboard	Lucy Trent	Episode: "Making News"
1990	Making News	Lucy Trent	Series regular
1991	The Ruth Rendell Mysteries	Verity	Episode: "Murder Being Once Done"
1991–1993	Jeeves and Wooster	Stiffy	3 episodes
1995	Screen Two	Prime Minister's Secretary	Episode: "A Very Open Prison"
1998	Ultraviolet	Clinic Manager	Episode: "Sub Judice"
