= Michael Attenborough =

English theatre director (born 1950)

The Honourable Michael Attenborough CBE
- Born: Michael John Attenborough; 13 February 1950 (age 76); London, England
- Education: University of Sussex
- Occupation: Theatre director
- Spouses: Jane Seymour (m. 1971; div. 1973); Karen Lewis (m. 1984)
- Children: Tom; Will
- Parents: Richard Attenborough (father); Sheila Sim (mother)
- Relatives: Jane Attenborough (sister); Charlotte Attenborough (sister); Frederick Attenborough (grandfather); David Attenborough (uncle); John Attenborough (uncle); Gerald Sim (uncle)

Michael John Attenborough CBE (born 13 February 1950) is an English theatre director.

== Background ==
Attenborough was born on 13 February 1950 in London, the only son of actress Sheila Sim and actor-director Richard Attenborough. He is the nephew of David Attenborough, and John Attenborough and the brother of Jane Attenborough and Charlotte Attenborough.

He is the recipient of two honorary doctorates, one from the University of Leicester, where he is now a Distinguished Honorary Fellow and one from the University of Sussex, where he is Honorary Professor of English and Drama. Attenborough was educated at Westminster School and at the University of Sussex.

== Theatre career ==
Attenborough was Artistic Director of the Almeida Theatre in London between 2002 and 2013. Previously, he was Associate Director of the Mercury Theatre Colchester 1972 to 74, the Leeds Playhouse (now West Yorkshire Playhouse) 1974 to 1979, the Young Vic 1979 to 1980, then Artistic Director of the Palace Theatre, Watford, 1980 to 1984, Artistic Director of Hampstead Theatre 1984 to 1989. He was Principal Associate Director and Executive Producer of the Royal Shakespeare Company (RSC) from 1990 to 2002. He continues to be an Honorary Associate Artist of the RSC.

In 2012, Attenborough was presented with the Award for Excellence in International Theatre by The International Theatre Institute.

In October 2012, he announced that, after 12 years as Artistic Director, he would step down from the Almeida in April 2013 to concentrate on his directing career.

Attenborough has directed Macbeth for the Queensland Theatre Company, Brisbane, Australia (March – April 2014) As You Like It for the Shakespeare Theatre Company in Washington, D.C. (2014), a UK national tour of J.B. Priestley's Dangerous Corner in 2014 and a new play by Deborah Bruce (Godchild) in October – November 2013 at the Hampstead Theatre. He directed a new play by Rebecca Gilman (Luna Gale) for the Hampstead Theatre. In September 2015, he directed Someone Who'll Watch Over Me for the Chichester Festival Theatre, then returned to Hampstead Theatre to direct the UK premiere of Neil LaBute's Reasons To Be Happy. Appointed Director Emeritus of the Royal Academy of Dramatic Art (RADA). He teaches there on a regular basis, as well as at three Universities – Sussex, Leicester and St Mary's.Patron of Artists In Residence. Trustee of Belarus Free Theatre and Lyceum Theatre Edinburgh. Associate Artist of Arts EducationalSchools.

== Honours ==
Attenborough was appointed Commander of the Order of the British Empire (CBE) in the 2013 Birthday Honours for services to theatre. He is the recipient of Honorary Doctorates from the Universities of Leicester, where he is a Distinguished Honorary Fellow and Sussex, where he is also Honorary Professor of English and Drama.

== Personal life ==
Attenborough married actress Jane Seymour in 1971; the marriage was dissolved in 1973. In 1984, he married actress Karen Lewis. They have two sons: theatre director Tom Attenborough (born 13 October 1986) and actor Will Attenborough (born 26 June 1991). One of his two younger sisters, Jane Holland, was killed in the 2004 Indian Ocean tsunami on 26 December 2004 along with her mother-in-law and Attenborough's 15-year-old niece, Lucy. His other sister, Charlotte, is a teacher with two children.
