= John Attenborough =

English motor industry executive (1928–2012)

- Born: John Michael Attenborough; 1 January 1928; Isleworth, Middlesex, England
- Died: 9 November 2012 (aged 84); Poole, Dorset, England
- Education: Clare College, Cambridge
- Occupations: Executive; financial advisor
- Spouse: Janet Cleverdon (m. 1956; died 2001)
- Children: 2
- Father: Frederick Attenborough
- Relatives: Richard Attenborough (brother); David Attenborough (brother); Sheila Sim (sister-in-law); Michael Attenborough (nephew); Jane Attenborough (niece); Charlotte Attenborough (niece); Tom Attenborough (great-nephew); Will Attenborough (great-nephew)

John Michael Attenborough (/ˈætənbərə/ AT-ən-bər-ə; 1 January 1928 – 9 November 2012) was an English executive in the motor industry and then a financial adviser. He was the younger brother of director and actor Richard Attenborough, and the naturalist Sir David Attenborough.

== Early life ==
Attenborough was born on 1 January 1928 in Isleworth. Like his brothers, he was educated at Wyggeston Grammar School for Boys in Leicester. After National Service, he studied modern languages at Clare College, Cambridge.

== Career ==
He worked in the motor trade and became a managing director of Mann Egerton, heading their Rolls-Royce division in Berkeley Street. He then became the head of the British operations of Italian car manufacturer Alfa Romeo. He finally ran a distribution business for motor cars in Dorset before retiring from the motor trade and becoming a financial adviser.

== Death ==
He was diagnosed with progressive supranuclear palsy (PSP) and died at his home in Poole, Dorset, on 9 November 2012, aged 84.
