= Richard Attenborough =

English actor and film director (1923–2014)

The Right Honourable The Lord Attenborough Kt CBE FRSA
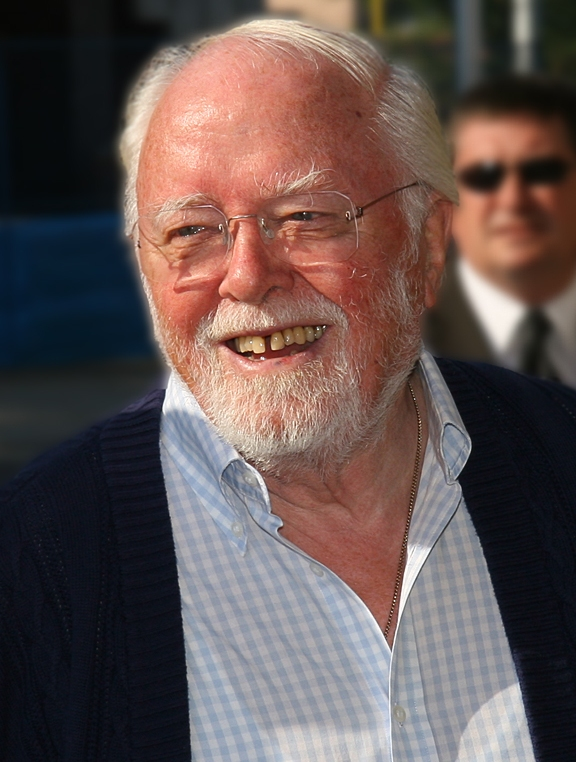
- Attenborough in 2007
- Born: Richard Samuel Attenborough; 29 August 1923; Cambridge, England
- Died: 24 August 2014 (aged 90); Northwood, London, England
- Resting place: St Mary Magdalene, Richmond, London
- Other name: Sir Richard Attenborough
- Occupations: Actor; director; producer; voice actor
- Years active: 1937–2007
- Political party: Labour
- Spouse: Sheila Sim (m. 1945)
- Children: Michael; Jane; Charlotte
- Parents: Frederick Attenborough (father); Mary Attenborough (mother)
- Relatives: David Attenborough (brother); John Attenborough (brother); Gerald Sim (brother-in-law); Tom Attenborough (grandson); Will Attenborough (grandson)

Chancellor of the University of Sussex
- In office 20 March 1998 – July 2008
- Vice-chancellor: Alasdair Smith; Michael Farthing
- Preceded by: The Duke of Richmond
- Succeeded by: Sanjeev Bhaskar

Member of the House of Lords
- Lord Temporal
- Life peerage 30 July 1993 – 24 August 2014
- Military career
- Allegiance: United Kingdom
- Branch: Royal Air Force
- Service years: 1940–1945
- Rank: Sergeant
- Unit: Film Production Unit
- Conflicts: Second World War

Richard Samuel Attenborough, Baron Attenborough (/ˈætənbərə/ AT-ən-bər-rə; 29 August 1923 – 24 August 2014) was an English actor, film director, and producer. He won a total of two Academy Awards, four BAFTA Awards, and six Golden Globe Awards for his directing and acting career spanning seven decades. He was knighted in 1976 for services to film and in 1983 he received the BAFTA Fellowship for lifetime achievement.

As an actor, Attenborough is best remembered for his film roles in Brighton Rock (1948), I'm All Right Jack (1959), The Great Escape (1963), Seance on a Wet Afternoon (1964), The Sand Pebbles (1966), Doctor Dolittle (1967), 10 Rillington Place (1971), Jurassic Park (1993) and Miracle on 34th Street (1994). On stage, he appeared in the West End in 1952, originating the role of Detective Sergeant Trotter in Agatha Christie's murder mystery The Mousetrap, which has since become the longest-running play in London and the world.

For his directorial debut in Oh! What a Lovely War (1969), Attenborough was nominated for the BAFTA Award for Best Direction. He was additionally nominated for his films Young Winston (1972), A Bridge Too Far (1977) and Cry Freedom (1987). For the film Gandhi (1983), he received the Oscars for Best Picture and Best Director. The British Film Institute ranked Gandhi number 34 in its list of greatest British films of the 20th century. His later films include Chaplin (1992) (a biography of Charlie Chaplin), and a fifth collaboration with Anthony Hopkins in Shadowlands (1993).

Attenborough was the president of the Royal Academy of Dramatic Art (RADA), of which he was an alumnus, and the British Academy of Film and Television Arts (BAFTA), as well as life president of the Premier League club Chelsea. He joined the Royal Air Force during World War II and served in the film unit, going on several bombing raids over continental Europe and filming the conflict from the rear gunner's position. He was the older brother of broadcaster and nature presenter Sir David Attenborough and motor executive John Attenborough. He was married to actress Sheila Sim from 1945 until his death.

== Early life ==
Attenborough was born on 29 August 1923 in Cambridge, Cambridgeshire, the eldest son of three from mother Mary Attenborough (née Clegg)—a founding member of the Marriage Guidance Council—and father Frederick Levi Attenborough, a scholar and academic administrator who was a fellow at Emmanuel College, Cambridge, and wrote a standard text on Anglo-Saxon law. Attenborough was educated at Wyggeston Grammar School for Boys in Leicester and studied at the Royal Academy of Dramatic Art (RADA) in London.

In September 1939, while father Frederick Attenborough was Principal of University College, Leicester (1932–1951), the Attenboroughs took in two German Jewish refugee girls, Helga and Irene Bejach (aged 9 and 11, respectively), the girls living with them in College House and being adopted by the family after the war, when it was discovered that their parents had been killed. The sisters moved to the US in the 1950s and lived with an uncle; Irene died in 1992, and Helga in 2005.

During the Second World War, Attenborough served in the Royal Air Force. After initial pilot training, he was seconded to the newly formed Royal Air Force Film Production Unit at Pinewood Studios, under the command of Flight Lieutenant John Boulting (whose brother, Peter Cotes, later directed Attenborough in the play The Mousetrap), where he appeared with Edward G. Robinson in the propaganda film Journey Together (1945). He then volunteered to fly with the film production unit; after further training, he sustained permanent ear damage. After being qualified as a sergeant, he flew on several operations over Europe, filming from the tail gunner's position to document the outcome of RAF Bomber Command sorties.

== Career ==
=== Acting ===
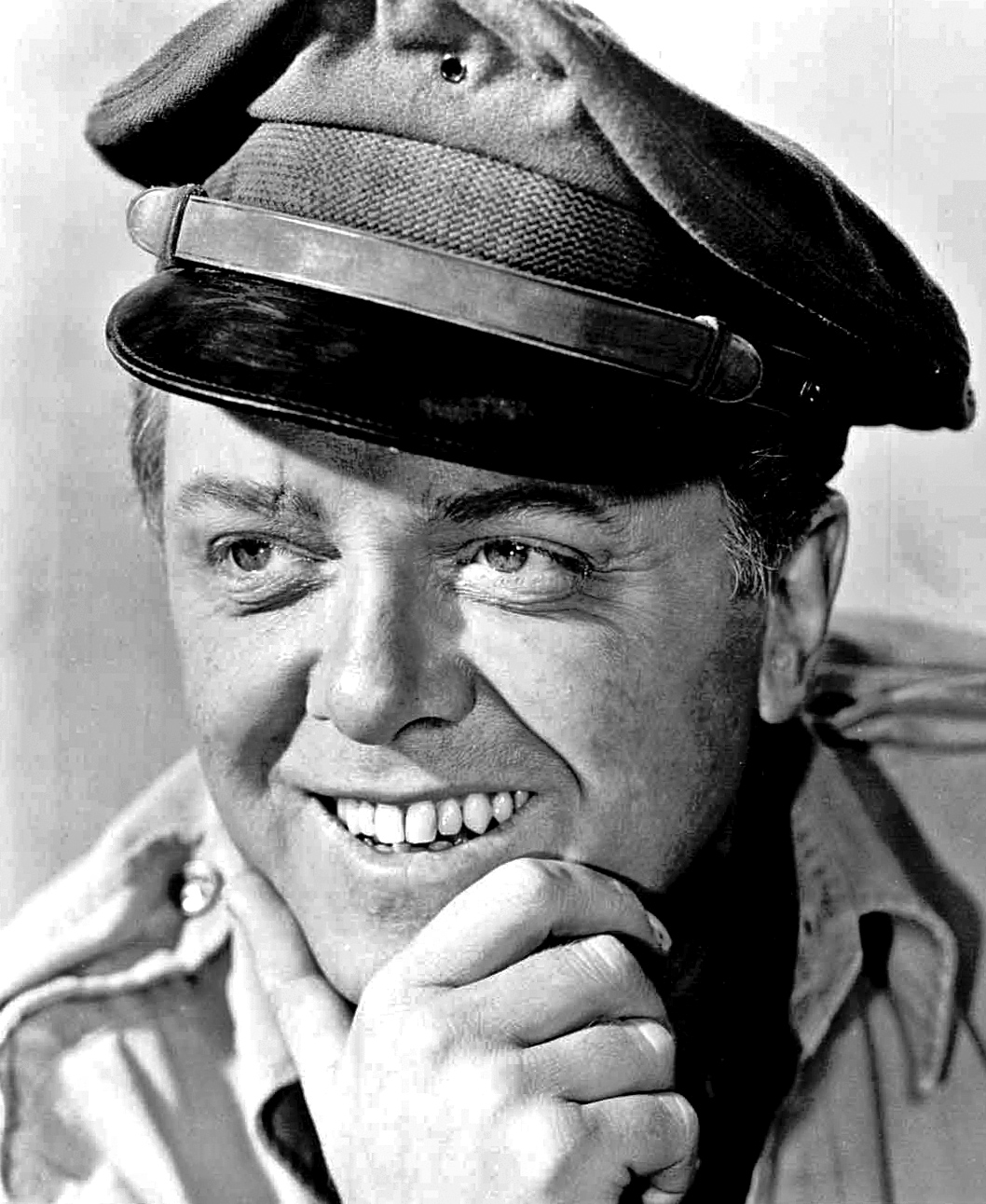
Attenborough in Flight of the Phoenix (1965)

Attenborough's acting career started on the theatre stage, where he appeared in shows at Leicester's Little Theatre, Dover Street, prior to his attending RADA. His debut was in 1937 when he played Lucius in Shakespeare's Julius Caesar. At the Little Theatre, he was coached for his RADA audition by Moyra Haywood, the theatre manager. He remained a Patron of the Little Theatre until his death.

Attenborough's first major, credited role was portraying Tommy Draper in Brian Desmond Hurst's The Hundred Pound Window (1944), a role in which the character helps to rescue his accountant father who has taken a wrong turn in life. Attenborough's film career had begun by 1942, in an uncredited role as a sailor deserting his post under fire in the Noël Coward/David Lean production In Which We Serve (his name and character were omitted from the original release-print credits), a role that helped typecast him for many years as a spiv in films like London Belongs to Me (1948), Morning Departure (1950) and his breakthrough role as Pinkie Brown in John Boulting's film adaptation of Graham Greene's novel Brighton Rock (1948), a role that he had previously played to great acclaim at the Garrick Theatre in 1943. He played the lead at age 22 as an RAF cadet pilot in Journey Together (1945), in which top-billed Edward G. Robinson played his instructor. In 1949, exhibitors voted him the sixth most popular British actor at the box office.

Early in his stage career, Attenborough starred in the West End production of Agatha Christie's The Mousetrap, which went on to become the world's longest-running stage production. Both he and his wife were among the original cast members of the production, which opened in 1952 at the Ambassadors Theatre, moving to St Martin's Theatre in 1974; the production ran continuously for nearly seven decades, until it was shut down by the COVID-19 pandemic in 2020. The Attenboroughs took a 10 per cent profit-participation in the production, which was paid for out of their combined weekly salary; Attenborough later wrote in his autobiography, "It proved to be the wisest business decision I've ever made... but foolishly I sold some of my share to open a short-lived Mayfair restaurant called 'The Little Elephant' and later still, disposed of the remainder in order to keep Gandhi afloat." At the beginning of the 1950s Attenborough featured on radio on the BBC Light Programme introducing records.

Attenborough worked prolifically in British films for the next 30 years, including in the 1950s, appearing in several successful comedies for John and Roy Boulting, such as Private's Progress (1956) and I'm All Right Jack (1959). In 1962, he appeared in The Dock Brief, a legal satire directed by James Hill and co-starring Peter Sellers (the second time he starred with Sellers having also appeared together in I'm All Right Jack), earning positive reviews for his performance with the BFI stating he "upstaged Sellers". In 1963, he appeared alongside Steve McQueen and James Garner in The Great Escape as RAF Squadron Leader Roger Bartlett ("Big X"), the head of the escape committee, based on the real-life exploits of Roger Bushell. It was his first appearance in a major Hollywood film blockbuster and his most successful film thus far. During the 1960s, he expanded his range of character roles in films such as Séance on a Wet Afternoon (1964) and Guns at Batasi (1964), for which he won the BAFTA Award for Best Actor for his portrayal of Regimental Sergeant Major Lauderdale.

In 1965 he played Lew Moran opposite James Stewart in The Flight of the Phoenix. In 1967 and 1968, he won back-to-back Golden Globe Awards in the category of Best Supporting Actor, the first time for The Sand Pebbles, again co-starring Steve McQueen, and the second time for Doctor Dolittle starring Rex Harrison. His portrayal of the serial killer John Christie in 10 Rillington Place (1971) garnered excellent reviews. In 1977, he played the ruthless General Outram, again to great acclaim, in the Indian director Satyajit Ray's period piece The Chess Players.

He took no acting roles following his appearance in Otto Preminger's version of The Human Factor (1979) until his appearance as John Hammond in Steven Spielberg's Jurassic Park (1993) and the film's sequel, The Lost World: Jurassic Park (1997). He starred in the remake of Miracle on 34th Street (1994) as Kris Kringle. Later he made occasional appearances in supporting roles, including as Sir William Cecil in the historical drama Elizabeth (1998), Jacob in Joseph and the Amazing Technicolor Dreamcoat and as "The Narrator" in the film adaptation of Spike Milligan's comedy book Puckoon (2002). He played the 'Old Gentleman' in the rear carriage of the train in the TV movie The Railway Children made in 2000.

He made his only appearance in a film adaptation of Shakespeare when he played the English ambassador who announces that Rosencrantz and Guildenstern are dead at the end of Kenneth Branagh's Hamlet (1996).

=== Directing ===
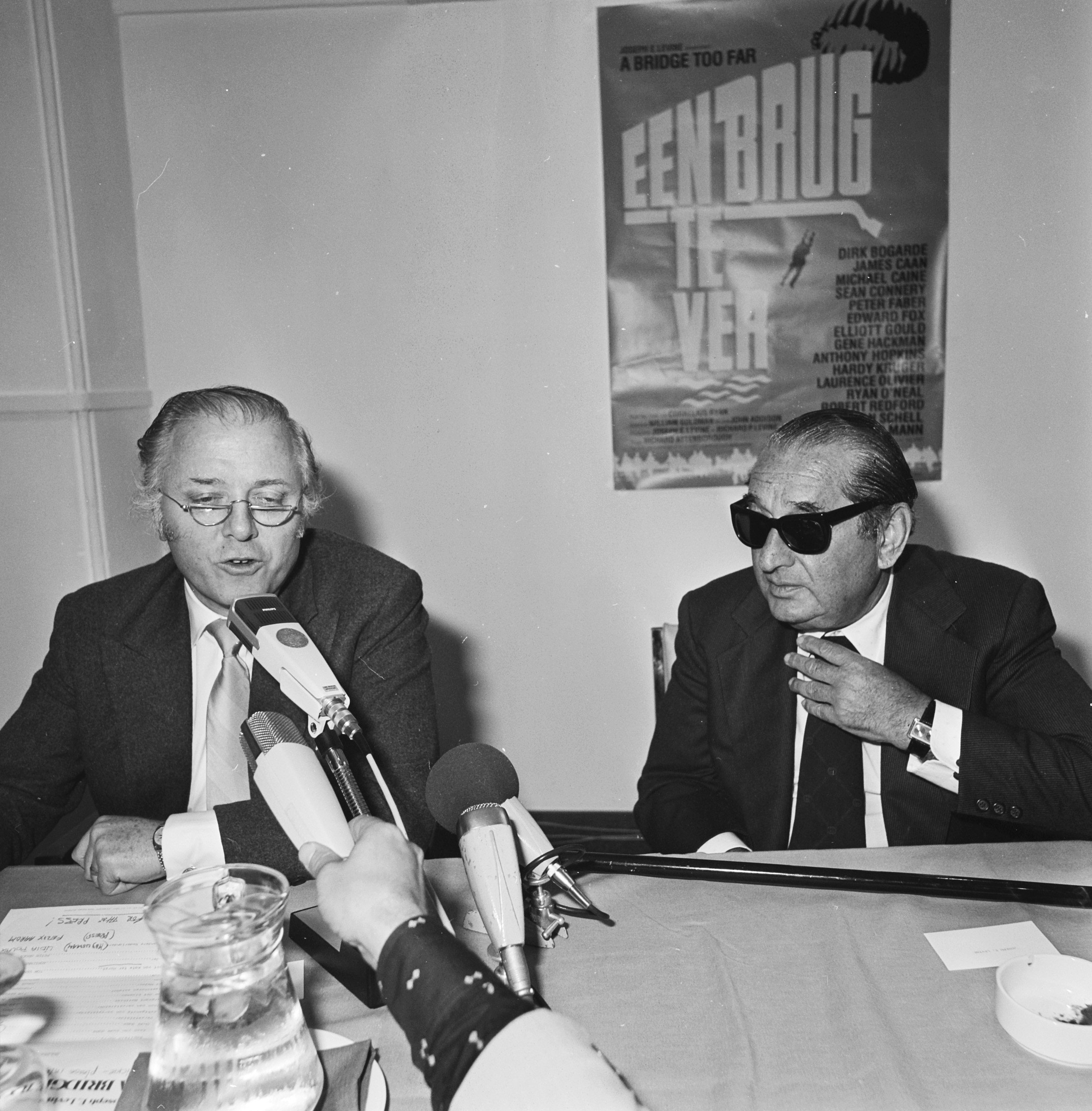
Attenborough in a press conference with Joseph E. Levine at the premiere of A Bridge Too Far, June 1977

In the late 1950s, Attenborough formed a production company, Beaver Films, with Bryan Forbes and began to build a profile as a producer on projects including The League of Gentlemen (1959), The Angry Silence (1960) and Whistle Down the Wind (1961), appearing in the cast of the first two films. His performance in The Angry Silence earned him his first nomination for a BAFTA Award, while Séance on a Wet Afternoon (1964) won him his first BAFTA.

His feature film directorial debut was the all-star screen version of the hit musical Oh! What a Lovely War (1969), after which his acting appearances became sporadic as he concentrated more on directing and producing. He later directed two epic period films: Young Winston (1972), based on the early life of Winston Churchill, and A Bridge Too Far (1977), an all-star account of Second World War Operation Market Garden.

He won the 1982 Academy Award for Best Director for his historical epic Gandhi, and as the film's producer, the Academy Award for Best Picture; two BAFTA Awards, for Best Director and Best Film (it remains BAFTA's most nominated film with 16), and two Golden Globes, this time for Best Director and Best Foreign Film, in 1983. He had been attempting to get the project made for 18 years. He directed the screen version of the musical A Chorus Line (1985) and the anti-apartheid drama Cry Freedom (1987). He was nominated for a Golden Globe Award for Best Director for both films. The success of the latter film prompted Attenborough to sign a contract with Universal Pictures to produce and direct films over the next five years, set to produce three films for the studio, and timetable calls would be set up by January and the first production was slated for release by 1989.

His later films as director and producer include Chaplin (1992) starring Robert Downey Jr. as Charlie Chaplin, and Shadowlands (1993), based on the relationship between C. S. Lewis and Joy Gresham (C. S. Lewis was portrayed by Anthony Hopkins, who had appeared in four previous films for Attenborough: Young Winston, A Bridge Too Far, Magic and Chaplin). While first working with Hopkins in the mid-1970s Attenborough called him "the greatest actor of his generation".

Between 2006 and 2007, he spent time in Belfast, working on his last film as director and producer, Closing the Ring, a love story set in Belfast during the Second World War, and starring Shirley MacLaine, Christopher Plummer and Pete Postlethwaite.

=== Later projects ===
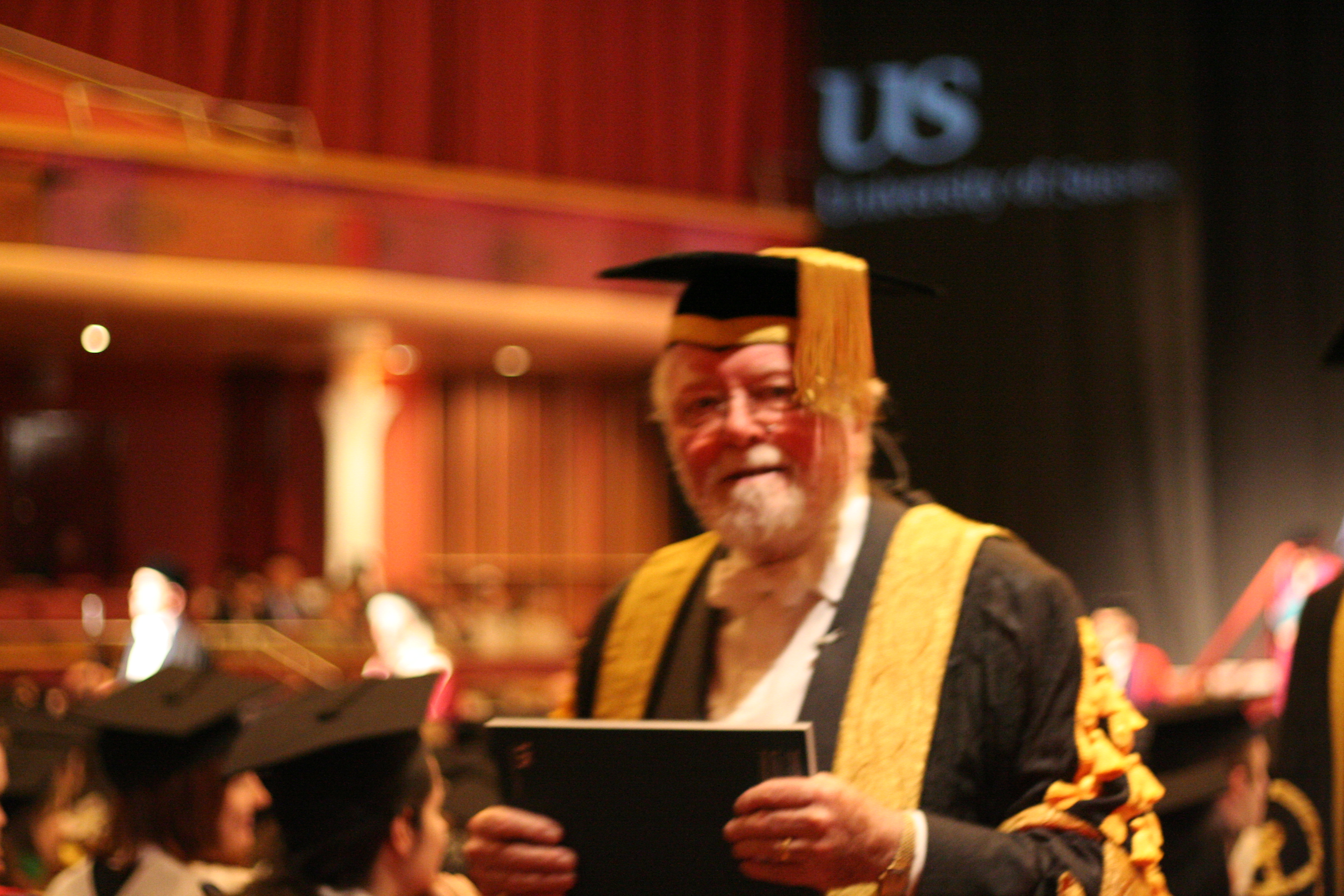
Lord Attenborough during his term as Chancellor of the University of Sussex, February 2006

After 33 years of dedicated service as President of the Muscular Dystrophy campaign, Attenborough became the charity's Honorary Life President in 2004. In 2012, the charity, which leads the fight against muscle-wasting conditions in the UK, established the Richard Attenborough Fellowship Fund to honour his lifelong commitment to the charity, and to ensure the future of clinical research and training at leading UK neuromuscular centres.

Attenborough was also the patron of the United World Colleges movement, whereby he contributed to the colleges that are part of the organisation. He was a frequent visitor to the Waterford Kamhlaba United World College of Southern Africa (UWCSA). With his wife, they founded the Richard and Sheila Attenborough Visual Arts Centre. He founded the Jane Holland Creative Centre for Learning at Waterford Kamhlaba in Swaziland (now Eswatini) in memory of his daughter who died in the tsunami on 26 December 2004.

He was a longtime advocate of education that does not judge upon colour, race, creed or religion. His attachment to Waterford was his passion for non-racial education, which were the grounds on which Waterford Kamhlaba was founded. Waterford was one of his inspirations for directing the film Cry Freedom, based on the life of anti-apartheid activist Steve Biko. In April 1988 Attenborough invited the International Baccalaureate to the premiere of the film, and he hosted a private viewing for the rest of the school at the Cinelux in Mbabane, Eswatini and took questions from the students.

Attenborough served as Chair of the British Film Institute between 1981 and 1992. He founded the Attenborough Arts Centre on the Leicester University campus in 1997, specifically designed to provide access for disabled people, in particular as practitioners. He was elected to the post of Chancellor of the University of Sussex on 20 March 1998, replacing Charles Gordon-Lennox, 10th Duke of Richmond. He stood down as Chancellor of the university following graduation in July 2008.

A lifelong supporter of Chelsea Football Club, Attenborough served as a director of the club from 1969 to 1982 and between 1993 and 2008 held the honorary position of Life Vice President. On 30 November 2008 he was honoured with the title of Life President at the club's stadium, Stamford Bridge.

He was also head of the consortium Dragon International Film Studios, which was constructing a film and television studio complex in Llanilid, Wales, nicknamed "Valleywood". In March 2008, the project was placed into administration with debts of £15 million and was considered for sale of the assets in 2011. A mooted long-term lease to Fox 21 fell through in 2015, though the facilities continue to be used for filmmaking.

He had a lifelong ambition to make a film about his hero the political theorist and revolutionary Thomas Paine, whom he called "one of the finest men that ever lived". He said in an interview in 2006 that "I could understand him. He wrote in simple English. I found all his aspirations – the rights of women, the health service, universal education... Everything you can think of that we want is in Rights of Man or The Age of Reason or Common Sense." He could not secure the funding to do so. The website "A Gift for Dickie" was launched by two filmmakers from Luton in June 2008 with the aim of raising £40m in 400 days to help him make the film, but the target was not met and the money that had been raised was refunded.

== Personal life ==
Attenborough's father was the principal of University College, Leicester, now the city's university. This resulted in a long association with the university, with Attenborough becoming a patron. The university's Embrace Arts at the RA centre, which opened in 1997 is named in his honour. He had two younger brothers: naturalist and broadcaster David and motor trade executive John.

Attenborough married actress Sheila Sim in Kensington on 22 January 1945. From 1949 until October 2012, they lived in Old Friars on Richmond Green in London which they had bought in their early acting days.

In the 1940s, he was asked to 'improve his physical condition' for his role as Pinkie in Brighton Rock. He trained with Chelsea Football Club for a fortnight, subsequently becoming good friends with those at the club. He went on to become a director during the 1970s, helping to prevent the club losing its home ground by holding onto his club shares and donating them, worth over £950,000, to Chelsea. In 2008, Attenborough was appointed Life President of Chelsea Football Club.

On 26 December 2004, the couple's elder daughter, Jane Holland (born 30 September 1955), along with her mother-in-law, Audrey Holland, and Attenborough's 15-year-old granddaughter, Lucy, were killed when a tsunami caused by the Indian Ocean earthquake struck Khao Lak, Thailand, where they were on holiday.

A service was held on 8 March 2005 and Attenborough read a lesson at the national memorial service on 11 May 2005. His grandson, who survived the tsunami uninjured, and granddaughter, who suffered severe leg injuries, also read in the service. A commemorative plaque was placed in the floor of St Mary Magdalene's parish church in Richmond. Attenborough later described the Boxing Day of 2004 as "the worst day of my life". Attenborough had two other children, Michael (born 13 February 1950) and Charlotte (born 29 June 1959). Michael is a theatre director formerly the Deputy Artistic Director of the RSC and artistic director of the Almeida Theatre in London and has been married to actress Karen Lewis since 1984; they have two sons, Tom and Will. Charlotte, an actress, married Graham Sinclair in 1993 and has two children.

At the 1983 United Kingdom general election Attenborough supported the Social Democratic Party. He publicly endorsed the Labour Party in the 2005 general election, despite his opposition to the Iraq War.

Attenborough collected Picasso ceramics from the 1950s. More than 100 items went on display at the New Walk Museum and Art Gallery in Leicester in 2007, in an exhibition dedicated to family members lost in the tsunami.

In 2008, he published an informal autobiography entitled Entirely Up to You, Darling in association with his colleague Diana Hawkins.

=== Health and death ===
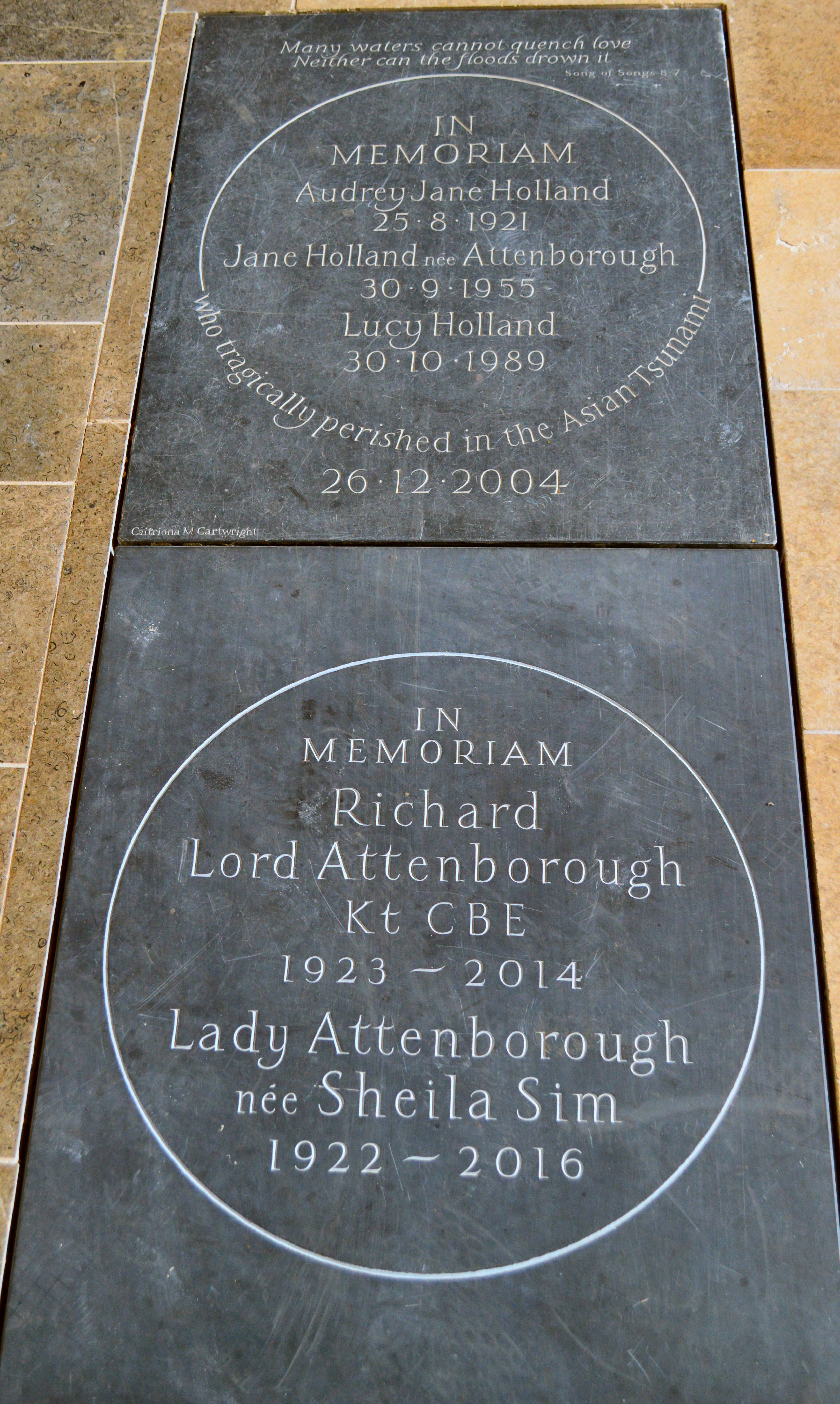
Markers for the graves of Richard Attenborough, Sheila Sim, their daughter Jane Holland and their granddaughter, Lucy, at St Mary Magdalene, Richmond

In August 2008, Attenborough entered hospital with heart problems and was fitted with a pacemaker. In December 2008, he suffered a fall at his home after a stroke and was admitted to St George's Hospital, Tooting, South West London. In November 2009, Attenborough, in what he called a "house clearance" sale, sold part of his extensive art collection, which included works by L. S. Lowry, C. R. W. Nevinson and Graham Sutherland, generating £4.6 million at Sotheby's.

In January 2011, he sold his Rhubodach estate on the Scottish Isle of Bute for £1.48 million. In May 2011, David Attenborough said his brother had required a wheelchair since his stroke in 2008, but was still capable of holding a conversation. He added that "he won't be making any more films."

In June 2012, shortly before her 90th birthday, Sheila Sim entered the professional actors' retirement home Denville Hall, in Northwood, London, for which she and Attenborough had helped raise funds. In October 2012, it was announced that Attenborough was putting the family home, Old Friars, with its attached offices, Beaver Lodge, which came complete with a sound-proofed cinema in the garden, on the market for £11.5 million. His brother David stated: "He and his wife both loved the house, but they now need full-time care. It simply isn't practical to keep the house on any more." In December 2012, in light of his deteriorating health, Attenborough moved into the same nursing home in London to be with his wife, as confirmed by their son Michael.

Attenborough died at Denville Hall, on 24 August 2014, five days short of his 91st birthday. He requested that his ashes be interred in a vault at St Mary Magdalene church in Richmond beside those of his daughter Jane and his granddaughter Lucy, who had died in the 2004 Boxing Day tsunami. He was survived by Sheila, his wife of 69 years, their oldest and youngest children, six grandchildren, two great-grandchildren, and his younger brother David. Sheila died on 19 January 2016.

== Honours ==
In the 1967 Birthday Honours, Attenborough was appointed a CBE. He was made a Knight Bachelor in the 1976 New Year Honours, having the honour conferred on 10 February 1976.

Attenborough was the subject of the BBC's This Is Your Life in December 1962 when he was surprised by Eamonn Andrews at the Savoy Hotel, during a dinner held to commemorate the 10th anniversary of the Agatha Christie play The Mousetrap, in which he had been an original cast member.

In 1983, Attenborough was awarded the Padma Bhushan, India's third highest civilian award, and the Martin Luther King Jr. Nonviolence Peace Prize by the Martin Luther King Jr. Center for Nonviolent Social Change. He was also awarded France's most distinguished awards, the Legion of Honour and the Order of Arts and Letters and the Order of the Companions of O. R. Tambo by the South African government for his "contribution to the struggle against apartheid in South Africa."

In 1992, the Hamburg-based Alfred Toepfer Foundation awarded Attenborough its annual Shakespeare Prize in recognition of his life's work. The following year he was appointed a Fellow of King's College London.

On 30 July 1993, he was created a life peer as Baron Attenborough, of Richmond upon Thames in the London Borough of Richmond upon Thames. Although the appointment by John Major was 'non-political' (it was granted for services to the cinema) and he could have been a crossbencher, Attenborough chose to take the Labour whip and so sat on the Labour benches. In 1992, he had been offered a peerage by Neil Kinnock, then leader of the Labour Party, but declined it as he felt unable to commit himself to the time necessary "to do what was required of him in the Upper Chamber, as he always put film-making first".

On 13 July 2006, Attenborough, along with his brother David, were awarded the titles of Distinguished Honorary Fellows of the University of Leicester "in recognition of a record of continuing distinguished service to the university". On 20 November 2008, Attenborough was awarded an Honorary Doctorate of Drama from the Royal Scottish Academy of Music and Drama (RSAMD) in Glasgow. Attenborough was an Honorary Fellow of Bangor University for his contributions to film making.

Pinewood Studios paid tribute to his body of work by naming a purpose-built 30,000-square-foot (2,800 m^{2}) sound stage after him. In his absence because of illness, Lord Puttnam and Pinewood chairman Lord Grade officially unveiled the stage on 23 April 2012.

The Arts for India charity committee honoured Attenborough posthumously on 19 October 2016 at an event hosted at the home of BAFTA.

== Filmography ==
=== As director / producer ===
Year	Title	Director	Producer
1960	The Angry Silence	No	Yes
1961	Whistle Down the Wind	No	Yes
1962	The L-Shaped Room	No	Yes
1964	Séance on a Wet Afternoon	No	Yes
1969	Oh! What a Lovely War	Yes	Yes
1972	Young Winston	Yes	Yes
1977	A Bridge Too Far	Yes	No
1978	Magic	Yes	No
1982	Gandhi	Yes	Yes
1985	A Chorus Line	Yes	No
1987	Cry Freedom	Yes	Yes
1992	Chaplin	Yes	Yes
1993	Shadowlands	Yes	Yes
1996	In Love and War	Yes	Yes
1999	Grey Owl	Yes	Yes
2007	Closing the Ring	Yes	Yes

=== Acting roles ===
Year	Title	Role	Notes
1942	In Which We Serve	A young stoker	
1943	Schweik's New Adventures	Railway worker	
1944	The Hundred Pound Window	Tommy Draper	
1945	Journey Together	David Wilton	
1946	A Matter of Life and Death	A British pilot	
1946	School for Secrets	Jack Arnold	
1947	The Man Within	Francis Andrews	
1947	Dancing with Crime	Ted Peters	
1948	Brighton Rock	Pinkie Brown	
1948	London Belongs to Me	Percy Boon	
1948	The Guinea Pig	Jack Read	
1949	The Lost People	Jan	
1949	Boys in Brown	Jackie Knowles	
1950	Morning Departure	Stoker Snipe	
1951	Hell Is Sold Out	Pierre Bonnet	
1951	The Magic Box	Jack Carter	
1952	Gift Horse	Dripper Daniels	
1952	Father's Doing Fine	Dougall	
1954	Eight O'Clock Walk	Thomas "Tom" Leslie Manning	
1955	The Ship That Died of Shame	George Hoskins	
1956	Private's Progress	Pvt. Percival Henry Cox	
1956	The Baby and the Battleship	Knocker White	
1957	Brothers in Law	Henry Marshall	
1957	The Scamp	Stephen Leigh	
1958	Dunkirk	John Holden	
1958	The Man Upstairs	Peter Watson	
1958	Sea of Sand	Brody	
1959	Danger Within	Capt. "Bunter" Phillips	
1959	I'm All Right Jack	Sidney De Vere Cox	
1959	Jet Storm	Ernest Tiller	
1959	SOS Pacific	Whitey Mullen	
1960	The Angry Silence	Tom Curtis	
1960	The League of Gentlemen	Lexy	
1960	Upgreen – And at 'Em		
1962	Only Two Can Play	Gareth L. Probert	
1962	All Night Long	Rod Hamilton	
1962	The Dock Brief	Herbert Fowle	
1963	The Great Escape	Sqn. Ldr. Roger Bartlett "Big X"	
1964	The Third Secret	Alfred Price-Gorham	
1964	Séance on a Wet Afternoon	Billy Savage	
1964	Guns at Batasi	Regimental Sgt. Major Lauderdale	
1965	The Flight of the Phoenix	Lew Moran	
1966	The Sand Pebbles	Frenchy Burgoyne	
1967	Doctor Dolittle	Albert Blossom	
1968	Only When I Larf	Silas	
1968	The Bliss of Mrs. Blossom	Robert Blossom	
1969	The Magic Christian	Oxford coach	
1970	The Last Grenade	Gen. Charles Whiteley	
1970	Loot	Inspector Truscott	
1970	A Severed Head	Palmer Anderson	
1971	10 Rillington Place	John Christie	
1972	Cup Glory	Narrator	
1974	And Then There Were None	Judge Arthur Cannon	
1975	Brannigan	Cmdr. Sir Charles Swann	
1975	Rosebud	Edward Sloat	
1975	Conduct Unbecoming	Maj. Lionel E. Roach	
1977	Shatranj Ke Khilari	Lt. General Outram	Hindi movie
1977	A Bridge Too Far	Lunatic wearing glasses	Uncredited
1979	The Human Factor	Col. John Daintry	
1993	Jurassic Park	John Hammond	
1994	Miracle on 34th Street	Kris Kringle	
1996	E=mc2	The Visitor	
1996	Hamlet	English Ambassador to Denmark	
1997	The Lost World: Jurassic Park	John Hammond	
1998	Elizabeth	Sir William Cecil	
1999	Joseph and the Amazing Technicolor Dreamcoat	Jacob	
2000	The Railway Children	The Old Gentleman	
2002	Puckoon	Narrator	Final film role
2015	Jurassic World	John Hammond	Archive audio only

=== Video game voice roles ===
Year	Title	Voice role
1997	Chaos Island: The Lost World	John Hammond
1998	Trespasser	John Hammond
2015	Lego Jurassic World	John Hammond (posthumous role using archive audio from the films)

== Bibliography ==
- Attenborough, Sir Richard (1980). "Contributor". David Jacob's Book of Celebrities' Jokes & Anecdotes. By Jacobs, David. Robson Books. p. 15. ISBN 0860511251.

== Awards and nominations ==
Year	Title	Academy Awards		BAFTA Awards		Golden Globe Awards	
Year	Title	Nominations	Wins	Nominations	Wins	Nominations	Wins
1969	Oh! What a Lovely War			10	6	1	1
1972	Young Winston	3		6	1	2	1
1977	A Bridge Too Far			8	4		
1978	Magic			1		1	
1982	Gandhi	11	8	16	5	5	5
1985	A Chorus Line	3		2		2	
1987	Cry Freedom	3		7	1	4	
1992	Chaplin	3		4	1	3	
1993	Shadowlands	2		6	1		
Total		25	8	60	19	18	7

=== Academy Awards ===
Year	Category	Nominated work	Result
Academy Awards
1982	Best Picture	Gandhi	Won
1982	Best Director	Gandhi	Won

=== BAFTA Awards ===
Year	Category	Nominated work	Result
British Academy Film Awards
1961	Best British Actor	The Angry Silence	Nominated
1963	Best British Actor	The Dock Brief	Nominated
1965	Best British Actor	Guns at Batasi	Won
1965	Best British Actor	Séance on a Wet Afternoon	Won
1970	Best Direction	Oh! What a Lovely War	Nominated
1978	Best Direction	A Bridge Too Far	Nominated
1983	Best Direction	Gandhi	Won
1983	Best Film	Gandhi	Won
1983	BAFTA Fellowship	—N/a	Honored
1988	Best Film	Cry Freedom	Nominated
1988	Best Direction	Cry Freedom	Nominated
1994	Best Film	Shadowlands	Nominated
1994	Best Direction	Shadowlands	Nominated
1994	Outstanding British Film	Shadowlands	Won

=== Golden Globe Awards ===
Year	Category	Nominated work	Result
Golden Globe Awards
1967	Best Supporting Actor – Motion Picture	The Sand Pebbles	Won
1968	Best Supporting Actor – Motion Picture	Doctor Dolittle	Won
1970	Best English-Language Foreign Film	Oh! What a Lovely War	Won
1973	Best English-Language Foreign Film	Young Winston	Won
1983	Best Foreign Language Film	Gandhi	Won
1983	Best Director – Motion Picture	Gandhi	Won
1986	Best Director – Motion Picture	A Chorus Line	Nominated
1988	Best Director – Motion Picture	Cry Freedom	Nominated

Directed Academy Award performances
Under Attenborough's direction, these actors have received Academy Award nominations (and one win) for their performances in their respective roles.

Year	Performer	Film	Result
Academy Award for Best Actor
1983	Ben Kingsley	Gandhi	Won
1993	Robert Downey Jr.	Chaplin	Nominated
Academy Award for Best Actress
1994	Debra Winger	Shadowlands	Nominated
Academy Award for Best Supporting Actor
1988	Denzel Washington	Cry Freedom	Nominated

== Portrayals ==
In early 1973, he was portrayed as "Dickie Attenborough" in the British Showbiz Awards sketch late in the third series of Monty Python's Flying Circus. Attenborough is portrayed by Eric Idle as effusive and simpering. A portrayal similar to that seen in Monty Python can be seen in the early series of the satirical puppet show Spitting Image, when Attenborough's caricature would be in floods of tears when he was shown a hanky and regularly appeared to thank others for an imaginary award.

In 1985 he was played by Chris Barrie in The Lenny Henry Show, in the final part of a serial pastiching A Passage to India and The Jewel in the Crown. In response to the villain claiming "Gandhi won't win!", he appears in a suit covered in Academy Awards and declares "We've already won!"

In 2012 Attenborough was portrayed by Simon Callow in the BBC Four biopic The Best Possible Taste, about Kenny Everett. In 2022 Harris Dickinson plays Attenborough in the comedy murder mystery See How They Run.

== See also ==
- List of Academy Award winners and nominees from Great Britain
- List of oldest and youngest Academy Award winners and nominees for Best Director

Media offices
Preceded by –	NFTS Honorary Fellowship	Succeeded by David Lean, CBE
Preceded by The Princess Royal	President of the British Academy of Film and Television Arts; 2001–2010	Succeeded by Prince William, The Duke of Cambridge
Preceded by Unknown	President of the Royal Academy of Dramatic Art; 2003–2014	Succeeded by Sir Kenneth Branagh
