= Allen Dulles =

Director of Central Intelligence from 1953 to 1961

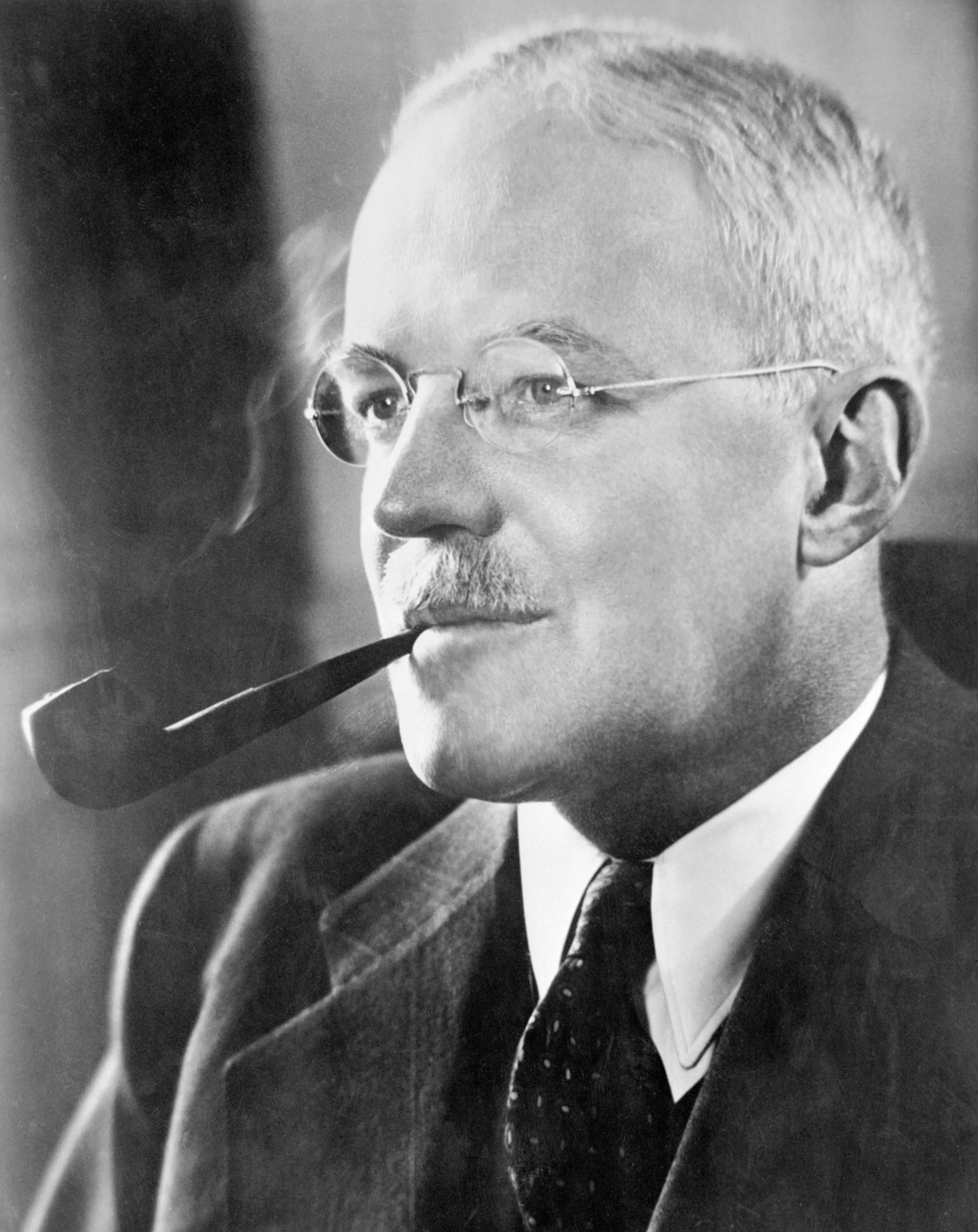

5th Director of Central Intelligence
- In office February 26, 1953 – November 29, 1961
- President: Dwight D. Eisenhower; John F. Kennedy
- Deputy: Charles P. Cabell
- Preceded by: Walter Bedell Smith
- Succeeded by: John A. McCone

4th Deputy Director of Central Intelligence
- In office August 23, 1951 – February 26, 1953
- President: Harry S. Truman; Dwight D. Eisenhower
- Preceded by: William H. Jackson
- Succeeded by: Charles P. Cabell

Deputy Director of Central Intelligence for Plans
- In office January 4, 1951 – August 23, 1951
- President: Harry S. Truman
- Preceded by: Position established
- Succeeded by: Frank Wisner

Personal details
- Born: Allen Welsh Dulles; April 7, 1893 Watertown, New York, U.S.
- Died: January 29, 1969 (aged 75) Washington, D.C., U.S.
- Resting place: Green Mount Cemetery
- Party: Republican
- Spouse: Martha "Clover" Todd (m. 1920)
- Children: 3
- Relatives: John Foster Dulles (brother); Eleanor Lansing Dulles (sister); John Watson Foster (grandfather); John Welsh Dulles (grandfather); Miron Winslow (great-grandfather); Harriet Winslow (great-grandmother); Avery Cardinal Dulles (nephew)
- Education: Princeton University (BA); George Washington University (LLB)

Allen Welsh Dulles (/ˈdʌlɪs/ DUL-iss; April 7, 1893 – January 29, 1969) was an American lawyer who was the first civilian director of central intelligence (DCI) and its longest serving director. As head of the Central Intelligence Agency (CIA) during the early Cold War, he oversaw numerous activities, such as US involvement in the 1953 Iranian coup d'état, the 1954 Guatemalan coup d'état, the Project MKUltra attempt to create a mind control program and the Bay of Pigs Invasion of Cuba in 1961. As a result of the failed invasion of Cuba, Dulles was forced to resign by President John F. Kennedy and was replaced with John McCone for the remainder of the Kennedy administration.

Following his resignation, Dulles was appointed to the Warren Commission tasked with investigating President Kennedy's assassination. His inclusion on the panel, despite having been dismissed by Kennedy and formerly serving as head of the CIA, has prompted sustained discussion among historians and commentators regarding potential conflicts of interest. While the 1979 House Select Committee on Assassinations concluded that the CIA as an institution was not involved in the assassination, debate persists over the extent of internal agency knowledge, as well as Dulles’s influence on the commission’s scope and findings.

Between his stints of government service, Dulles was a corporate lawyer and partner at Sullivan & Cromwell. His older brother, John Foster Dulles, was the Secretary of State during the Eisenhower administration and is the namesake of Dulles International Airport.

== Early life and family ==
Dulles was born on April 7, 1893, in Watertown, New York, one of five children of Presbyterian minister Allen Macy Dulles and his wife, Edith (née Foster) Dulles. Allen Macy Dulles mixed theological liberalism with stern orthopraxy. He was five years younger than his brother, John Foster Dulles, Dwight D. Eisenhower's Secretary of State and chairman and senior partner of Sullivan & Cromwell, and two years older than his sister, the diplomat Eleanor Lansing Dulles. His maternal grandfather, John W. Foster, was Secretary of State under Benjamin Harrison, while his uncle by marriage, Robert Lansing was Secretary of State under Woodrow Wilson. Growing up in a parsonage, Dulles was made to attend church daily. As his parents distrusted public education, Dulles was homeschooled by various private tutors.

Dulles graduated from Princeton University, where he participated in the American Whig–Cliosophic Society. He taught school in India before entering the diplomatic service in 1916. In 1920, he married Martha "Clover" Todd (March 5, 1894 – April 15, 1974). They had three children: daughters Clover and Joan and son Allen Macy Dulles II (1930–2020), who was wounded and permanently disabled in the Korean War and spent the rest of his life in and out of medical care. According to his sister, Eleanor, Dulles had "at least a hundred" extramarital affairs, including some during his tenure with the CIA.

== Early career ==
Initially assigned to Vienna, Dulles was transferred to Bern, Switzerland, along with the rest of the embassy personnel shortly before the U.S. entered the First World War. Later in life, Dulles said he had been telephoned by Vladimir Lenin, seeking a meeting with the American embassy on April 8, 1917, the day before Lenin left Switzerland to travel to Saint Petersburg aboard a German train. After recovering from the Spanish flu, he was assigned to the American delegation at the Paris Peace Conference, along with his elder brother Foster.

In 1921, while at the US Embassy in Istanbul, Dulles helped expose The Protocols of the Elders of Zion as a forgery. He unsuccessfully attempted to persuade the US State Department to publicly denounce the forgery. From 1922 to 1926, Dulles served as chief of the Near East division of the Department of State. He then earned a law degree from George Washington University Law School and took a job at Sullivan & Cromwell, the New York firm where his brother, John Foster Dulles, was a partner. He became a director of the Council on Foreign Relations in 1927, the first new director since the Council's founding in 1921. He was the Council's secretary from 1933 to 1944 and its president from 1946 to 1950.

During the late 1920s and the early 1930s, he served as legal adviser to the delegations on arms limitation at the League of Nations. He met with Adolf Hitler, Benito Mussolini, Soviet Foreign Minister Maxim Litvinov, and the prime ministers of Britain and France. In April 1933, Dulles and Norman Davis met with Hitler in Berlin on State Department duty. After the meeting, Dulles wrote to his brother Foster and reassured him that conditions under Hitler's regime "are not quite as bad" as an alarmist friend had indicated. Dulles rarely spoke about his meeting with Hitler, and future CIA director Richard Helms had not even heard of their encounter until decades after the death of Dulles and expressed shock that his former boss had never told him about it. After meeting with German Information Minister Joseph Goebbels, Dulles stated he was impressed with him and cited his "sincerity and frankness" during their interaction.

In 1935, Dulles returned from a business trip to Germany concerned by the Nazi treatment of German Jews; despite his brother's objections, he led a movement within the law firm of Sullivan & Cromwell to close their Berlin office. The effort was successful, and the firm ceased to conduct business in Nazi Germany. As the Republican Party began to divide into isolationist and interventionist factions, Dulles became an outspoken interventionist, running unsuccessfully in 1938 for the Republican nomination in New York's Sixteenth Congressional District on a platform calling for the strengthening of U.S. defenses. Dulles collaborated with Hamilton Fish Armstrong, the editor of Foreign Affairs magazine, on two books, Can We Be Neutral? (1936), and Can America Stay Neutral? (1939). They concluded that diplomatic, military, and economic isolation, in a traditional sense, were no longer possible in an increasingly interdependent international system. Dulles helped some German Jews, such as the banker Paul Kemper, escape to the United States from Nazi Germany.

== World War II and OSS career ==
In July 1941, with World War II raging in Europe, William J. Donovan was tasked by US President Roosevelt to establish an American intelligence service, which became the Office of Strategic Services. Dulles was recruited by Donovan in October 1941, and assigned as liaison with the "British Security Co-ordination" office in New York City (the US outpost of MI6).

In 1942, Dulles was sent to Switzerland, arriving in Bern on 12 November 1942. He rented an apartment at Herrengasse 23 for the duration of the war. As Swiss Director of the OSS, Dulles gathered intelligence about German plans and activities, and established wide contacts with German émigrés and resistance figures, including anti-Nazi intelligence officers. He was assisted by Gero von Schulze-Gaevernitz, a German emigrant. Dulles also received valuable information from German diplomat Fritz Kolbe, whom he described as the best spy of the war. Kolbe supplied secret documents about active German spies and plans for the Messerschmitt Me 262 jet fighter. Dulles' activities resulted in tension with MI6, who had been building up extensive operations in Switzerland since 1939. They warned their station head, Frederick 'Fanny' Vanden Heuvel, that Dulles would "lend himself easily to any striking proposal which looks like notoriety". Vanden Heuvel agreed that Dulles was "out for himself", but became a personal friend.

One of Dulles' early contacts was Hans Bernd Gisevius, the Zürich representative of German military intelligence. Gisevius was already an important source for Polish intelligence and MI6, as he regularly met with their agent Halina Szymańska. Gisevius purported to be involved in anti-Nazi circles, but MI6 suspected that some of the information he provided about German military plans was intentional misinformation, and it is still unclear where his true loyalty lay at this time. One of Gisevius' claims was that the Germans could read the cipher that Dulles was using, but despite knowing this, Dulles used it to send to Washington a report of his Gisevius meeting, including a claim that the Germans planned to launch suicide attacks against London with flying boats. MI6 were unimpressed, both because he was potentially putting his source in danger and because the plan was implausible. The assistant chief of MI6, Claude Dansey, described Dulles as a "fool" who "swallows [false information] easily". At a subsequent meeting, Gisevius urged Dulles to use MI6 communications instead, which he did. By February 1944, Szymańska reported that Gisevius was persona non grata with his own side and unable (or unwilling) to provide any intelligence, which MI6 considered was due to Dulles allowing the source of his information to become widely known in Washington.

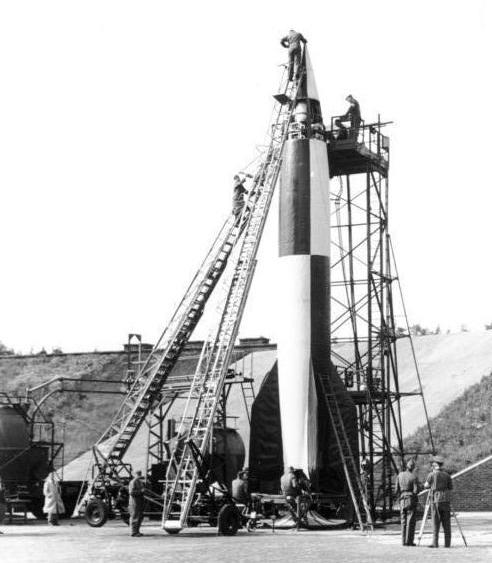
Allen Dulles used information from Heinrich Maier's resistance group for the very important Operation Crossbow.

Dulles was in contact with the Austrian resistance group around the priest Heinrich Maier, who collected information through many different contacts with scientists and the military. From 1943 onward, he received very important information from this resistance group about V-weapons, tanks, and aircraft, and related factories. This helped Allied bombers to target important armaments factories. In particular, Dulles obtained crucial information for Operation Crossbow and Operation Hydra. The group reported to him about the mass murder in Auschwitz. Through the Maier Group and Kurt Grimm, Dulles also received information about the economic situation in the Nazi sphere of influence. After the resistance group was uncovered by the Gestapo, Dulles sent American agents to Austria to contact any surviving members.

Although Washington barred Dulles from making firm commitments to the German anti-Hitler conspirators, they nonetheless gave him reports on developments in Germany, including sketchy but accurate warnings of plans for the V-1 flying bomb and V-2 rocket. As the Third Reich neared defeat in 1944 and 1945, Dulles and his law firm, Sullivan & Cromwell, worked with several German industrialists to move Nazi funds out of Germany's territory. Heinrich Himmler, Reichsführer of the German SS, began transferring Nazi wealth, including that stolen from Jewish Holocaust victims, to other countries to support a postwar "Fourth Reich." Brigadeführer Kurt Baron von Schröder, who cooperated with Himmler on his plan, was a business associate of Dulles. Dulles and Schröder created companies through which they moved Nazi wealth to other nations. This operation infuriated U.S. FBI Director J. Edgar Hoover, who unsuccessfully pressured President Harry S. Truman to disrupt the plan. However, given the ties of the British royal family to German wealth, no formal investigation began.

In the days before his death, Mussolini was in contact with American intelligence, specifically with the agent "Don Jones", who was working with partisans in Switzerland, explaining that he wished to surrender to them, but given that there was no way to get Mussolini to Switzerland and Dulles lacked adequate forces to protect him from the partisans (if they had managed to capture him in Italy), he instructed Jones not to take action. After Mussolini's death, Dulles himself remarked: "Mussolini was captured and hanged, which in my view was probably a better solution than a trial."

Dulles was involved in Operation Sunrise, secret negotiations in March 1945 to arrange a local surrender of German forces in northern Italy. His actions in Operation Sunrise have been criticized by historians for offering German SS General Karl Wolff protection from prosecution at the Nuremberg trial, and creating a diplomatic rift between the U.S. and U.S.S.R. After the war in Europe, Dulles served for six months as the OSS Berlin station chief and later as station chief in Bern. The Office of Strategic Services was dissolved in October 1945 and its functions transferred to the State and War Departments.

== Post World War II career ==
In 1947, Dulles served as a senior staffer on the Herter Committee. Dulles was part of the informal but influential Georgetown Set of Cold War liberals after 1945, with many of its members involved in the founding of the CIA.

== CIA career ==
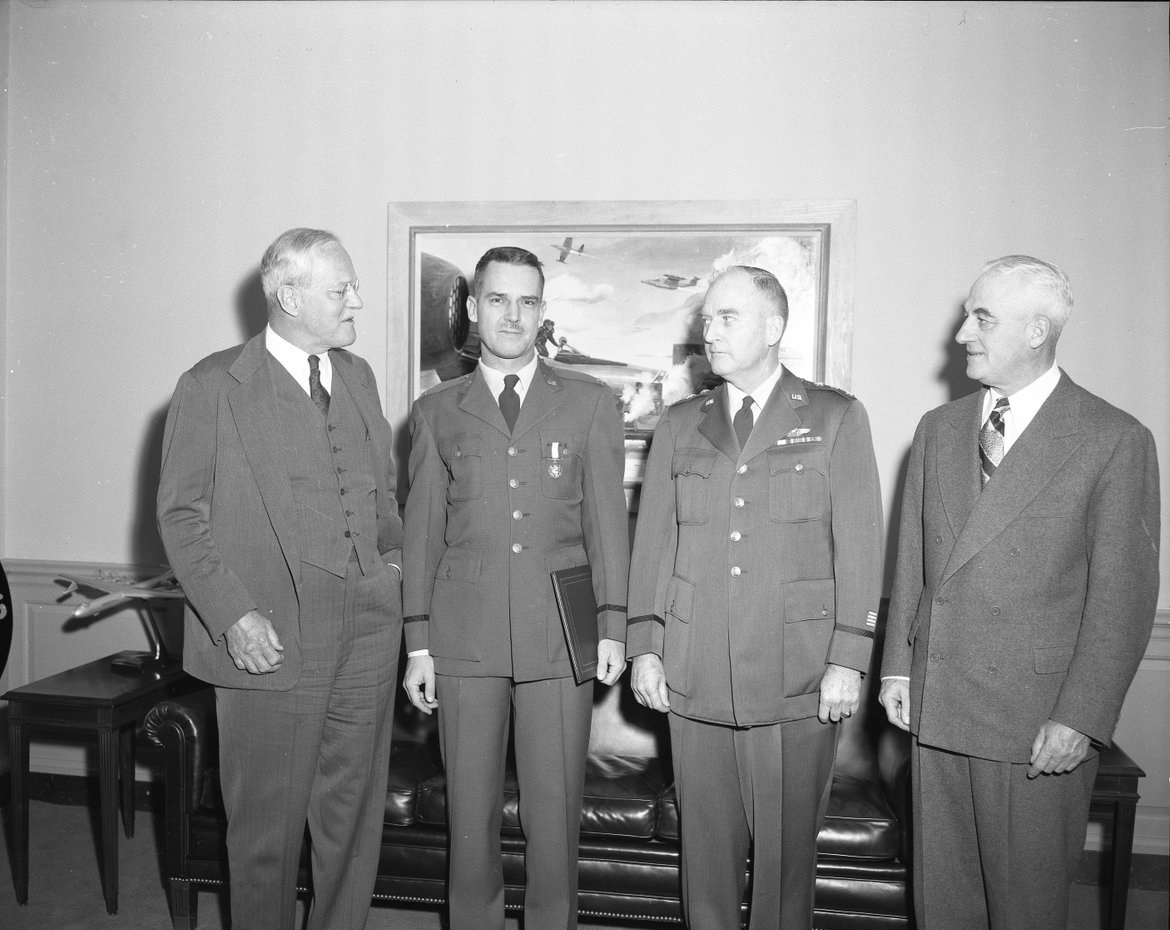
(from l. to r.) C.I.A. Director Allen Dulles with C.I.A. Counter-insurgency expert Colonel Edward Lansdale, United States Air Force Chief of Staff General Nathan F. Twining, and C.I.A. Deputy Director Lieutenant General Charles P. Cabell at the Pentagon in 1955.

In the 1948 Presidential election, Dulles was, together with his brother, an advisor to Republican nominee Thomas E. Dewey. The Dulles brothers and James Forrestal helped form the Office of Policy Coordination. During 1949 he co-authored the Dulles–Jackson–Correa Report, which was sharply critical of the Central Intelligence Agency, which had been established by the National Security Act of 1947. Partly as a result of the report, Truman named a new Director of Central Intelligence, Lieutenant General Walter Bedell Smith.

Smith recruited Dulles into the CIA to oversee the agency's covert operations as Deputy Director for Plans, a position he held from January 4, 1951. On August 23, 1951, Dulles was promoted to deputy director of Central Intelligence, second in the intelligence hierarchy. In this capacity, in 1952–53 he was one of five members of the State Department Panel of Consultants on Disarmament during the last year of the Truman administration.

After the election of Dwight Eisenhower in 1952, Bedell Smith shifted to the Department of State and Dulles became the first civilian Director of Central Intelligence. Dulles played a role in convincing Eisenhower to follow one of the conclusions of the State Department Panel report, that the American public deserved to be informed of the perils of possible nuclear war with the Soviet Union, because even though America held numerical nuclear superiority, the Soviets would still have enough nuclear weapons to severely damage American society regardless of how many more such bombs the United States might possess or how badly those U.S. weapons could destroy the Soviets.

The Agency's covert operations were an important part of the Eisenhower administration's new Cold War national security policy known as the "New Look". At Dulles's request, President Eisenhower demanded that Senator Joseph McCarthy discontinue issuing subpoenas against the CIA. In March 1950, McCarthy had initiated a series of investigations into potential communist subversion of the Agency. Although none of the investigations revealed any wrongdoing, the hearings were potentially damaging, not only to the CIA's reputation but also to the security of sensitive information. Documents made public in 2004 revealed that the CIA, under Dulles's orders, had broken into McCarthy's Senate office and fed disinformation to him in order to discredit him, in order to stop his investigation of alleged communist infiltration of the CIA.

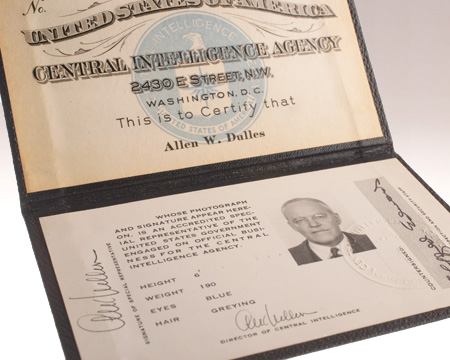
CIA ID card of Allen Dulles

In the early 1950s, the United States Air Force conducted a competition for a new photo reconnaissance aircraft. Lockheed Aircraft Corporation's Skunk Works submitted a design number called the CL-282, which married sailplane-like wings to the body of a supersonic interceptor. This aircraft was rejected by the Air Force, but several of the civilians on the review board took notice, and Edwin Land presented a proposal for the aircraft to Dulles. The aircraft became what is known as the U-2 'spy plane', and it was initially operated by CIA pilots. Its introduction into operational service in 1957 greatly enhanced the CIA's ability to monitor Soviet activity through overhead photo surveillance. The aircraft eventually entered service with the Air Force. The Soviet Union shot down and captured a U-2 in 1960 during Dulles's term as CIA chief.

Dulles is considered one of the creators of the modern United States intelligence system and was a guide to clandestine operations during the Cold War. He established intelligence networks worldwide to check and counter Soviet and eastern European communist advances as well as international communist movements.

=== Coup in Iran ===
In 1953, Dulles was involved, along with Frank Wisner, in Operation Ajax, the covert operation that led to the removal of democratically elected prime minister of Iran, Mohammad Mossadegh, and his replacement with Mohammad Reza Pahlavi, Shah of Iran. Rumors of a Soviet takeover of the country had surfaced due to the nationalization of the Anglo-Iranian Oil Company. By coincidence, on August 18, 1953, Dulles was taking a vacation in Rome while the Shah fled there after a setback in the coup, and the two met while checking in to the Hotel Excelsior. The meeting turned out to be fortuitous for the United States and the coup. CIA and independent historians say that the meeting was happenstance, but conspiracy theories abound.

=== Coup in Guatemala ===
President Jacobo Arbenz Guzman of Guatemala was removed in 1954 in a CIA-led coup carried out under the code name Operation PBSuccess. Eduardo Galeano described Dulles as a former member of the United Fruit Company's Board of Directors. However, in a detailed examination of the connections between the United Fruit Company and the Eisenhower Administration, Immerman makes no mention of Dulles being part of the United Fruit Company's Board, although he does note that Sullivan & Cromwell had represented the company.

=== Congo ===
In 1960 a plan to kill Patrice Lumumba was considered and Dulles allocated $100,000 to the plan, but it never materialised. Dulles believed that Lumumba posed "a grave danger as long as he was not disposed of".

=== Dismissal ===
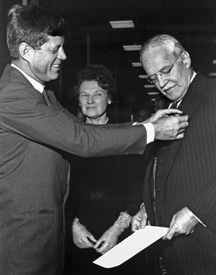
Kennedy presents the National Security Medal to Dulles, November 28, 1961.

During the Kennedy administration, Dulles faced increasing criticism. In autumn 1961, following the Bay of Pigs incident and the Algiers putsch against Charles de Gaulle, Dulles and his entourage, including Deputy Director for Plans Richard M. Bissell Jr. and Deputy Director Charles Cabell, were forced to resign. On November 28, 1961, Kennedy presented Dulles with the National Security Medal at the CIA Headquarters in Langley, Virginia. The next day, November 29, the White House released a resignation letter signed by Dulles. He was replaced by John McCone. Dulles referred to the Bay of Pigs failure as "the worst day of my life" and developed a strong dislike of Kennedy, later telling journalist Willie Morris "that little Kennedy, he thought he was a god". Dulles found life outside the CIA difficult, with his friend James Angleton recalling "He had a very difficult time to decompress".

== Later life ==
Later, after the assassination of John F. Kennedy, on November 22, 1963, President Lyndon B. Johnson appointed Dulles as one of seven commissioners of the Warren Commission to investigate the assassination of John F. Kennedy. Some historians later criticized the appointment, noting that Kennedy fired him. Therefore, he was unlikely to be impartial in passing the judgments charged to the Warren Commission. In the view of journalist and author Stephen Kinzer, Johnson appointed Dulles primarily so that Dulles could "coach" the Commission on how to interview CIA witnesses and what questions to ask because Johnson and Dulles were both anxious to ensure that the Commission did not discover Kennedy's secret involvement in the administration's illegal plans to assassinate Castro and other foreign leaders. Robert F. Kennedy also urged Johnson to put Dulles on the Warren Commission, most likely fearing revelation of Kennedy's clandestine involvement in Cuba.

In 1966, Princeton University's American Whig-Cliosophic Society awarded Dulles the James Madison Award for Distinguished Public Service. Dulles published the book The Craft of Intelligence in 1963, although it was primarily written by ghost writers, and edited Great True Spy Stories in 1968. He was honoured by then DCI Richard Helms with a plaque on the CIA building. It is reported he suffered from Alzheimer’s disease in the final years of his life. He died on January 29, 1969, of influenza, complicated by pneumonia, at the age of 75, in Georgetown, D.C. He was buried in Green Mount Cemetery in Baltimore, Maryland.

== Fictional portrayals ==
- Liberation (1970–1971), a multinational fictional film series that shows Dulles in a photograph torn apart by Joseph Stalin in Film IV: The Battle of Berlin.
- Seventeen Moments of Spring (1973), a Soviet television miniseries in which Vyacheslav Salevich depicts Dulles's role in Operation Sunrise during World War II.
- In the Blackford Oakes novels (1976–2005), a spy series written by William F. Buckley Jr., Dulles is portrayed in several books, acting in his role as director of the CIA.
- JFK (1991), a film that depicts Jim Garrison, a New Orleans District Attorney, as suspecting Dulles as a participant in the cover-up surrounding Kennedy's assassination and attempts to subpoena him.
- The Commission (2003), a fictional film that depicts Dulles, played by Jack Betts, as a participant in the Warren Commission and investigator into the Kennedy assassination.
- The Good Shepherd (2006), a fictional film in which Matt Damon portrays the fictional character Edward Wilson who is based on Dulles.
- The Company (2007), an American miniseries based on the novel The Company: A Novel of the CIA (2002) by American novelist Robert Littell.
- The Honor of Spies (2009) in the Honor Bound series and also the Men At War series, a novel series written by W.E.B. Griffin and his son. Dulles is portrayed as part of the European Head of the OSS and the Swiss Agent in Charge respectively.
- Nick and Jake (2012), a novel co-written by Tad Richards and Jonathan Richards and published by Arcade Publishing. Allen Dulles is depicted as plotting a coup to overthrow the government of France.
- Bridge of Spies (2015), a movie about the exchange of Rudolf Abel and Francis Gary Powers, depicts a conversation between James B. Donovan (portrayed by Tom Hanks) and Dulles (portrayed by Peter McRobbie).
- Central Intelligence (2024) is a ten-part dramatisation of the emergence and development of the Central Intelligence Agency (CIA) told from the perspective of Eloise Page. Broadcast on BBC Radio 4, the series features Ed Harris as Allen Dulles.

== Publications ==
=== Articles ===
- "The Power of the President Over Foreign Affairs." Michigan Law Review, vol. 14, no. 6 (April 1, 1916), pp. 470–478. University of Michigan Law School. doi:10.2307/1275947. JSTOR 1275947.
- "New Uses for the Machinery for the Settlement of International Disputes: Discussion." Proceedings of the Academy of Political Science, vol. 13, no. 2 (1929), pp. 100–104. doi:10.2307/1172785. JSTOR 1172785.
- Dulles, Allen Welsh (April 1, 1927). Coolidge, Archibald Cary (ed.). "Some misconceptions about disarmament". Foreign Affairs. Vol. 5, no. 3. New York, NY: Council on Foreign Relations (CFR). pp. 413–424. doi:10.2307/20028543. ISSN 0015-7120. JSTOR 20028543.
- Dulles, Allen Welsh (October 1, 1932). Armstrong, Hamilton Fish (ed.). "Progress toward Disarmament". Foreign Affairs. Vol. 11, no. 1. New York, NY: Council on Foreign Relations (CFR). pp. 54–65. doi:10.2307/20030483. ISSN 0015-7120. JSTOR 20030483.
- Dulles, Allen Welsh (April 1, 1925). Coolidge, Archibald Cary (ed.). "Alternatives for Germany". Foreign Affairs. Vol. 25, no. 3. New York, NY: Council on Foreign Relations (CFR). pp. 421–432. doi:10.2307/20030052. ISSN 0015-7120. JSTOR 20030052.
- Dulles, Allen Welsh (May 10, 1965). Boudin, Michael; Breyer, Stephen (eds.). "Review: [Untitled]: Reviewed work: Communism and Revolution: The Strategic Use of Political Violence by Cyril E. Black, Thomas P. Thornton". Harvard Law Review. Vol. 78, no. 7. Cambridge, MA: The Harvard Law Review Association (Harvard Law School). pp. 1500–1502. doi:10.2307/1338919. ISSN 0017-811X. JSTOR 1338919. LCCN 12032979. OCLC 46968396.

=== Book reviews ===
- Dulles, Allen Welsh (2003). Armstrong, Hamilton Fish (ed.). "That Was Then: Allen W. Dulles on the Occupation of Germany". Foreign Affairs. Vol. 82, no. 6. New York, NY: Council on Foreign Relations (CFR). pp. 2–8. doi:10.2307/20033751. ISSN 0015-7120. JSTOR 20033751.

=== Books ===
- Dulles, Allen Wells; Armstrong, Hamilton Fish (1936). Can We Be Neutral? (1st ed.). New York, NY: Harper & Brothers/Council on Foreign Relations (CFR). OCLC 513361.
- Dulles, Allen Wells; Armstrong, Hamilton Fish (1939). Can America Stay Neutral (1st ed.). New York, NY: Harper & Brothers. OCLC 256170.
- Dulles, Allen Welsh (1947). Germany's underground (1st ed.). New York, NY: The Macmillan Company. LCCN 47002566.
- The Marshall Plan. Co-authored by Michael Wala. Providence, RI: Berg, 1993. ISBN 978-0854963508
- Dulles, Allen Welsh; Petersen, Nancy (1996). Petersen, Neal H. (ed.). From Hitler's Doorstep: The Wartime Intelligence Reports of Allen Dulles, 1942–1945 (1st ed.). Pennsylvania, PA: Pennsylvania State University Press. ISBN 978-0-271-01485-2 – via Google Books.
- Dulles, Allen Wells (1966). The Secret Surrender: The Classic Insider's Account of the Secret Plot to Surrender Northern Italy During WWII. Popular Library. Vol. 60 (1st ed.). Guilford, CT: Harper & Row. ISBN 9789160042242.
- Dulles, Allen Welsh (2006) [1963]. The Craft of Intelligence: America's Legendary Spy Master on the Fundamentals of Intelligence Gathering for a Free World (PDF). Guilford, CT: The Lyons Press. ISBN 1592282970.

=== Books edited ===
- Great True Spy Stories. New York: Harper & Row (1968).

=== Book contributions ===
- Foreword to To the Bitter End: An Insider's Account of the Plot to Kill Hitler, by Hans B. Gisevius. New York: Da Capo Press (1998). ISBN 978-0306808692.

== See also ==
- Dulles' Plan, a post-Cold War conspiracy theory centering around an alleged plan to destroy the Soviet Union

== Bibliography ==
- Dulles, Allen Wells; Armstrong, Hamilton Fish (1936a). Can We Be Neutral? (1st ed.). New York City, New York, USA: Harper & Brothers/Council on Foreign Relations (CFR). OCLC 513361.
- Dulles, Allen Wells; Armstrong, Hamilton Fish (1939a). Can America Stay Neutral (1st ed.). New York City, New York, USA: Harper & Brothers. OCLC 256170.
- Dulles, Allen (1947). Germany's Underground. New York: The Macmillan Company. p. 207. LCCN 47002566.
- Dulles, Allen; Wala, Michael (1993). The Marshall Plan. Providence, RI: Berg. ISBN 978-0-85496-350-8.
- Dulles, Allen Welsh; Petersen, Nancy (1996). Petersen, Neal H. (ed.). From Hitler's Doorstep: The Wartime Intelligence Reports of Allen Dulles, 1942–1945 (1st ed.). Pennsylvania, PA: Pennsylvania State University Press. ISBN 978-0-271-01485-2 – via Google Books.
- Dulles, Allen Wells (1966). The Secret Surrender: The Classic Insider's Account of the Secret Plot to Surrender Northern Italy During WWII. Popular Library. Vol. 60 (1st ed.). Guilford, Connecticut, USA: Harper & Row. ISBN 9789160042242.
- Dulles, Allen (1963). The Craft of Intelligence: America's Legendary Spy Master on the Fundamentals of Intelligence Gathering for a Free World (PDF). Guilford, CT: The Lyons Press. ISBN 1-59228-297-0.
- Grose, Peter (1994). Gentleman Spy: The Life of Allen Dulles. Boston, MA: Houghton Mifflin. ISBN 978-0395516072.
- Immerman, Richard H. (1982). The CIA in Guatemala: The Foreign Policy of Intervention. University of Texas Press. ISBN 978-0-292-71083-2.
- Kinzer, Steven (2013). The Brothers: John Foster Dulles, Allen Dulles, and Their Secret World War. New York: Times Books. ISBN 978-0805094978.
- Lisagor, Nancy; Lipsius, Frank (1988). A Law Unto Itself: The Untold Story of the Law Firm Sullivan and Cromwell. New York: William Morrow. ISBN 0-688-04888-9.
- Mosley, Leonard (1978). Dulles: A Biography of Eleanor, Allen, and John Foster Dulles and their Family Network. New York: Dial Press. ISBN 9780803717442.
- Petersen, Neal H. ed. From Hitler's Doorstep: The Wartime Intelligence Reports of Allen Dulles 1942-1945 (Penn State University Press, 1995)
- Poulgrain, Greg. JFK Vs. Allen Dulles: Battleground Indonesia (Simon and Schuster, 2020).
- Srodes, James (1999). Allen Dulles: Master of Spies. Washington, D.C.: Regnery. ISBN 0-89526-314-9.
- Trento, Joseph John (2001). The Secret History of the CIA. Roseville, CA: Prima. ISBN 978-0-7615-2562-2.
- Wardaya, Baskara T. "The Long Shadow of the Cold War: The Cold War Policies of the United States towards Asia and their Impact on Indonesia." International Quarterly for Asian Studies 52.3-4 (2021): 331–347.
- Weiner, Tim (2007). Legacy of Ashes: The History of the Central Intelligence Agency. New York: Doubleday. ISBN 978-0-385-51445-3.

Government offices
New office	Deputy Director of Central Intelligence for Plans; 1951	Succeeded by Frank Wisner
Preceded by William H. Jackson	Deputy Director of Central Intelligence; 1951–1953	Succeeded by Charles P. Cabell
Preceded by Walter B. Smith	Director of Central Intelligence; 1953–1961	Succeeded by John McCone
