= Bouvier des Flandres =

Dog breed

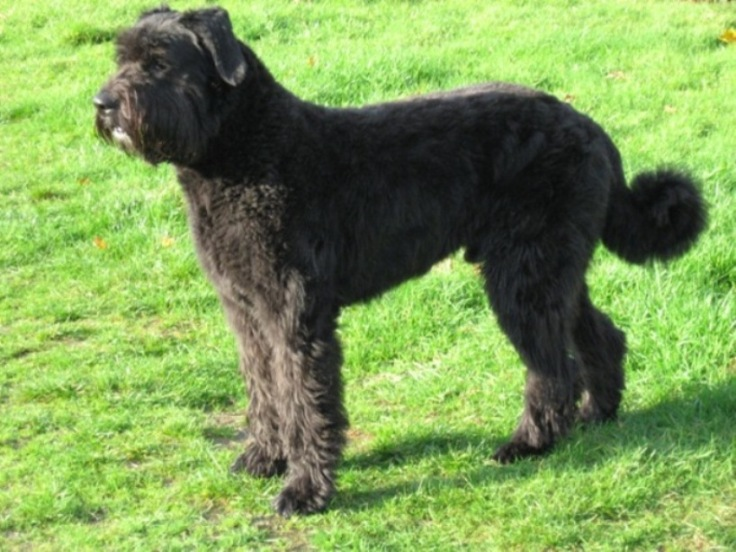
- A Bouvier des Flandres
- Other names: Flanders Cattle Dog; Vlaamse Koehond
- Origin: Belgium (Flanders); France
Traits
Height	Males	62–68 cm (24–27 in)
	Females	59–65 cm (23–26 in)
Weight	Males	35–55 kg (77–121 lb)
	Females	27–35 kg (60–77 lb)
- Coat: Double coat with rough looking outer coat
- Colour: fawn, brindle, black, grey or blonde
- Litter size: 5–10, average 8
Kennel club standards
- Société Royale Saint-Hubert: standard
- Société Centrale Canine: standard
- Fédération Cynologique Internationale: standard

The Bouvier des Flandres is a herding dog breed originating in Flanders, Belgium. They were originally used for general farm work including cattle droving, sheep herding, and cart pulling, and nowadays as guard dogs and police dogs, as well as being kept as pets.

The French name of the breed means, literally, "Cow Herder of Flanders", referring to the Flemish origin of the breed. Other names for the breed are Toucheur de Boeuf (cattle driver), Vlaamse Koehond (Flemish cow dog), and Vuilbaard (dirty beard).

== History ==
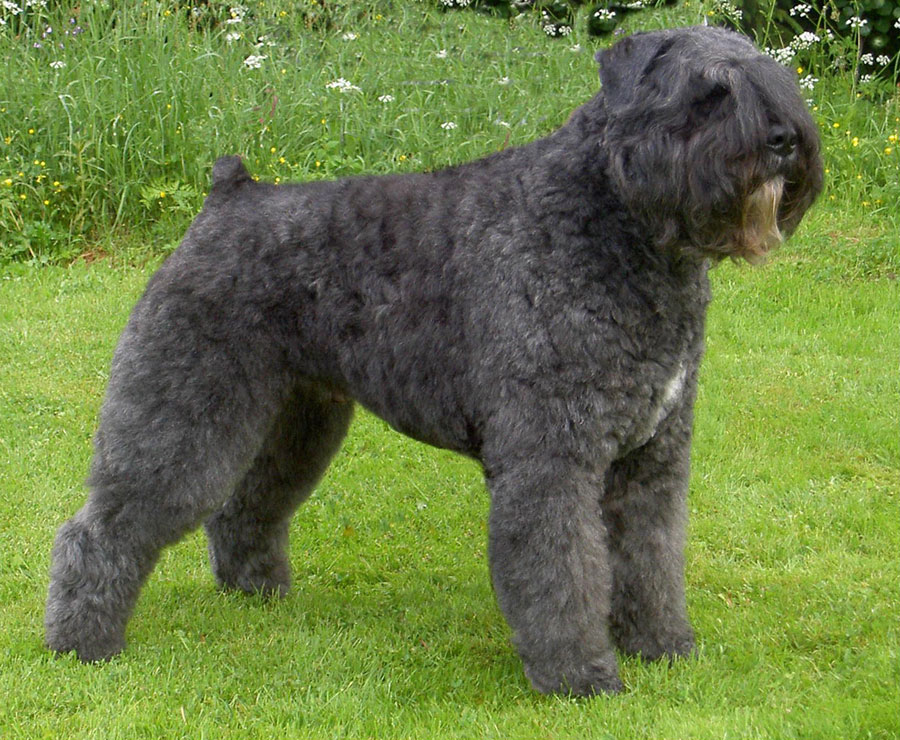
An adult Bouvier des Flandres

The monks at the Ter Duinen monastery were among the earliest known dog breeders in Flanders. The bouviers bred by them are recorded as having been bred from imports such as Irish Wolfhounds and Scottish Deerhounds with local farm dogs, until a breed considered to be the predecessor of the modern Bouvier des Flandres was obtained. This became a working dog with the strength and temperament to perform herding, guard cattle, and even pull cargo carts, and to withstand the local weather conditions due to its thick coat. The breed's practical use became antiquated after the invention of the automobile, when cattle were more practically transported by trucks.

Historically, the ear cropping and tail docking could have been done for practical reasons, avoiding accidental amputations in the course of work, or to indicate the dog was working stock and not a pet subject to taxation.

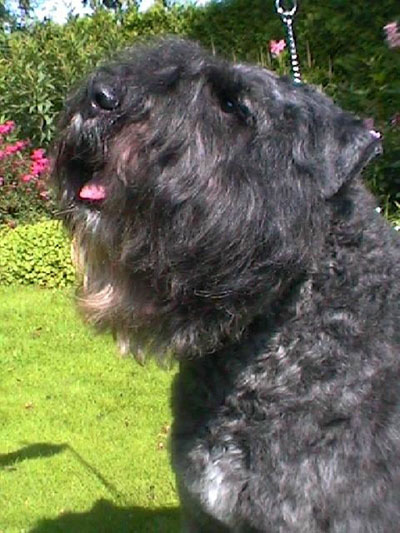
Bouvier des Flandres closeup

Up until the early 20th century, the breed was not completely defined, with three variants: Paret, Moerman or Roeselare, and Briard. Conflict between the proponents of these three variants held the breed's development back. In 1912 and 1913, several local kennel clubs recognized standards for Bouviers; however they usually had different standards for the Roeselare and other variants.

World War I nearly caused the breed to disappear, due to the devastation that came over its region of origin and the fact that the dogs were used for military purposes. Indeed, Nic, a male trained as a trench dog who served during the war and was a perennial winner at dog shows after the war, is considered to be the founder of the early Bouvier des Flandres breed.

A unified Bouvier des Flandres standard was created in 1936 by a joint French-Belgian committee. However, World War II again endangered the breed's existence. Due to these setbacks, progress was slowed, and it was not until 1965 that the Fédération Cynologique Internationale (FCI) breed standard, as agreed to by several minor kennel clubs, was adopted.

== Description ==
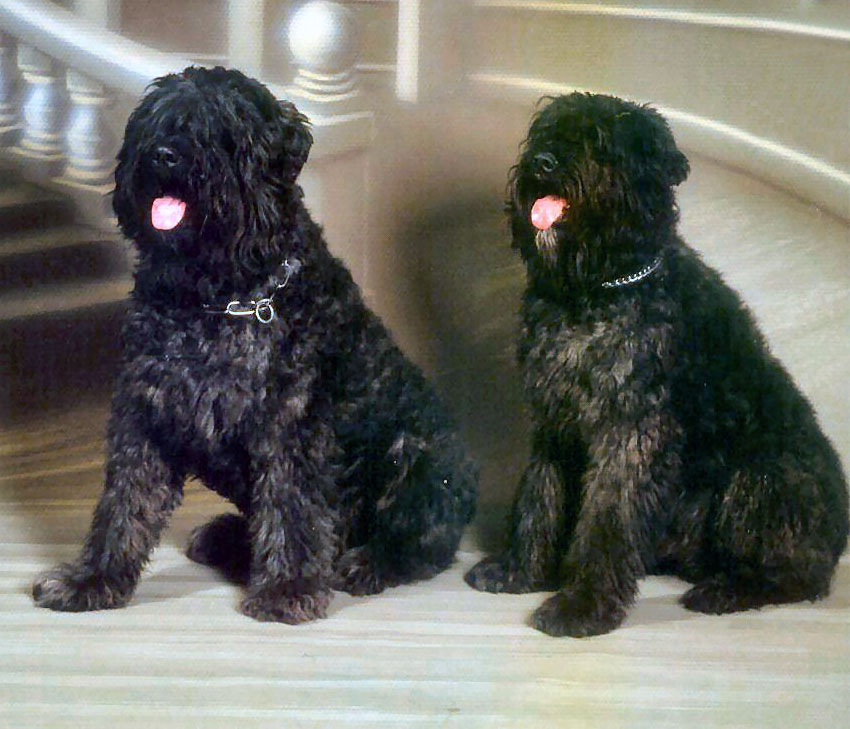
Two Bouviers des Flandres

=== Appearance ===
The Bouvier is a rough-coated dog of rugged appearance. It gives the impression of size and strength without clumsiness. The head is accentuated by a "heavy beard" and "mustache". Although the practice of cropping both ears and tail are now mostly cosmetic, tails were originally docked to prevent injuries caused by herding and cart-pulling. The practice of cosmetic docking is illegal in some countries and currently opposed by the American Veterinary Medical Association.

In the area of origin (Flanders, Belgium) cropping was made illegal in 2006. The weight of males ranges from 80 to 120 pounds or 36 to 54 kilograms, slightly lighter on average for females. They are built with a thick double coat, which can be fawn, black, grey brindle, or "pepper and salt" in color. Bouviers are sometimes considered non-shedding, but still do lose hair, like all dogs. Most of the hair that they lose is caught within the double coat which results in matting. They require weekly brushing and combing to maintain their coat. In addition to weekly brushing, the coat should be trimmed approximately every 3–5 weeks if it is to be a show dog.

=== Temperament ===
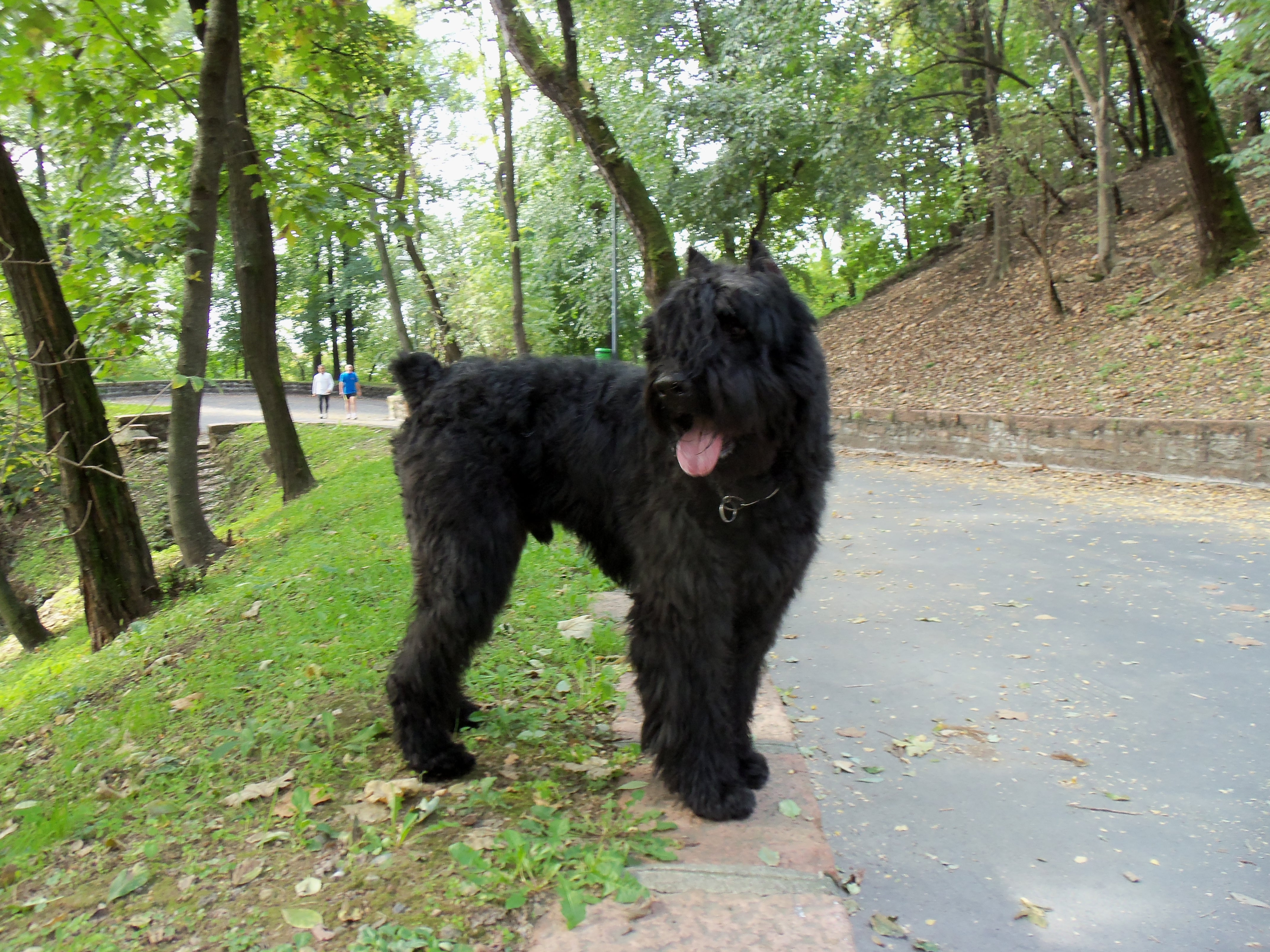
An adult Bouvier

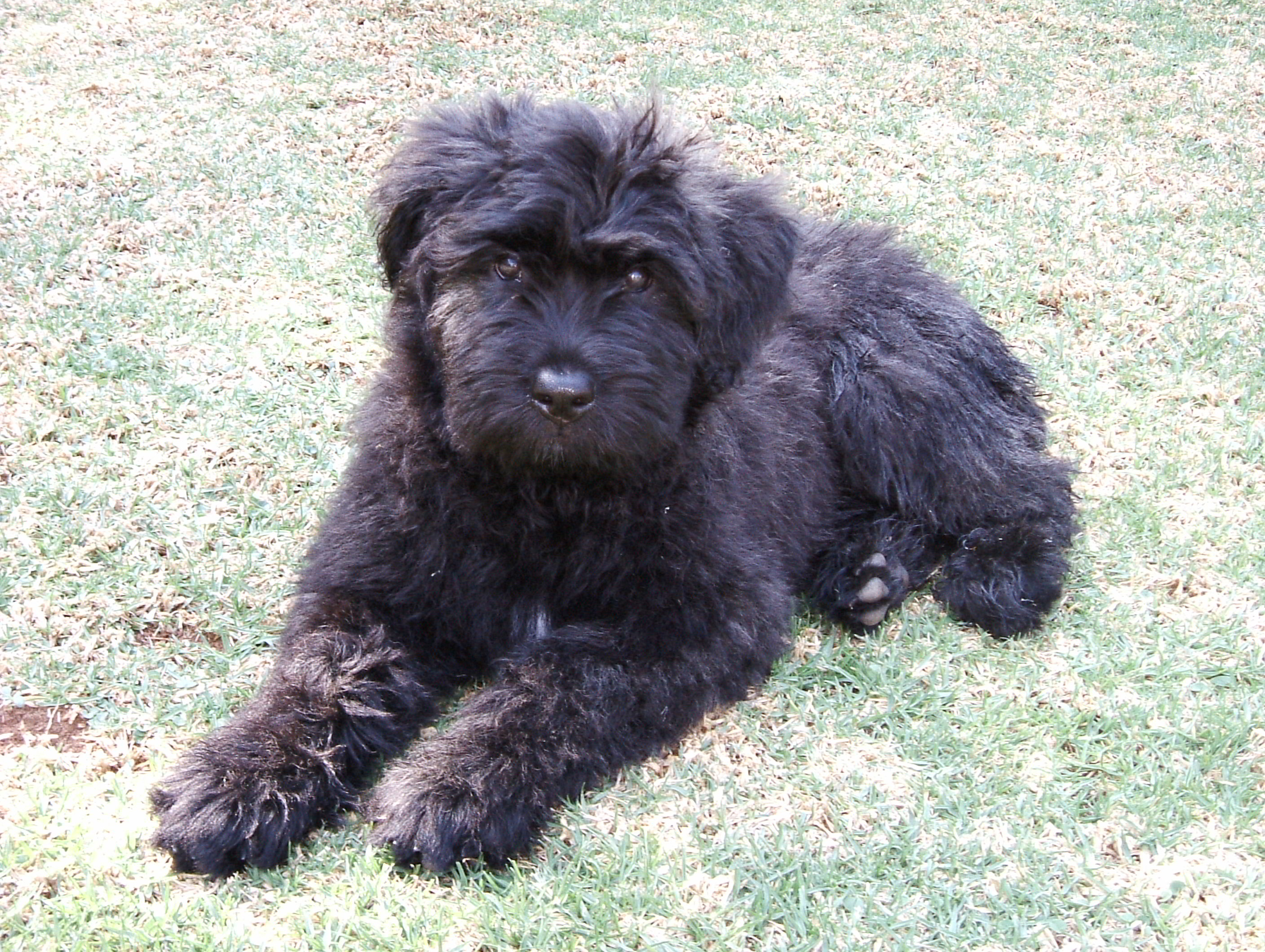
A 3-month-old Bouvier

Bouviers des Flandres are described as gentle, rational, even-tempered, loyal, and protective by nature. The breed's blend of characteristics makes them suitable as family pets and guard dogs. Bouviers are considered easily trainable watch dogs that learn commands relatively quickly. However, they are said to learn best when repetition is limited, as boredom from repetition can hinder their training and learning ability.

Bouviers possess some sophisticated traits, such as complex intelligence and accountability.

Bouviers should be socialized well, preferably starting at an early age, to avoid shyness, suspiciousness, and being overly reserved with strangers (although the breed is naturally aloof with strangers). Protecting the family when in danger is not something that needs to be taught, nor is it something one can train out of them. They can coexist well with children. Obedience training should start when they are young. They are usually good with other dogs if they are raised with them from puppyhood. Bouviers can be aggressive if the owners are not clear and consistent enough to communicate what is problematic. Bouviers do not fully mature both mentally and physically until around the age of 2–3 years old.

=== Activities ===
Bouviers des Flandres can compete in dog agility trials, carting, obedience, dog showmanship, Schutzhund, tracking, and herding events. Herding instincts and trainability can be measured at noncompetitive herding tests. Bouviers exhibiting basic herding instincts can then be trained to compete in herding trials.

== Health ==
A 2024 UK study found a life expectancy of 11.3 years for the breed compared to an average of 12.7 for purebreeds and 12 for crossbreeds.

== Notable Bouviers des Flandres ==
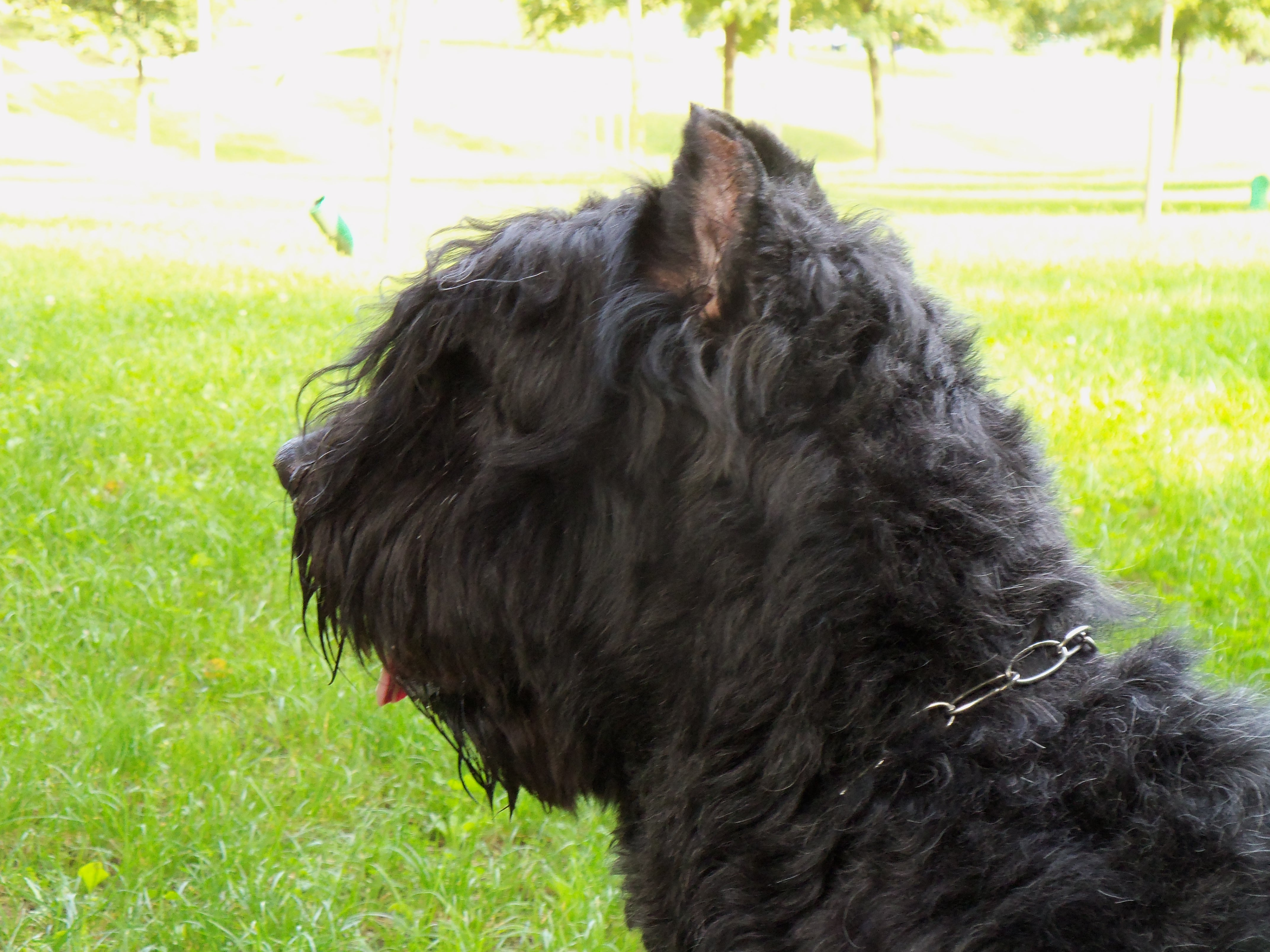
Bouvier des Flandres closeup

- Belco, the dog that accompanied Edmee Bowles to America when she fled occupied Belgium and who was the foundation stud of her kennel Clos du Cereberes at Belco Farm in Pennsylvania.
- Soprano de la Thudinie, the post-war foundation stud of Justin Chastel's de la Thudinie kennel in Belgium and the most prominent ancestor of the modern type of Bouvier des Flandres.
- Lucky, owned by United States President Ronald Reagan and First Lady Nancy Reagan.
- Patrasche, the dog found by a boy named Nello in A Dog of Flanders, is often asserted to be a Bouvier des Flandres.
- Max and his mate Madchen and their puppies, fictional characters featured in W.E.B. Griffin's Presidential Agent series.
- Isabelle du Monceau de Bergendal, a character within the Strike Witches series, has a Bouvier des Flandres as her familiar animal.
- Gretel, a Bouvier des Flandres, is the dog of Dr. Robert Romano on ER.
- Kirie, a young female Bouvier, is owned by criminal police officer Gereon Rath, the protagonist of Volker Kutscher's series of detective novels set in the 1930s Berlin. Originally belonging to a murdered Belgian actress, Kirie is adopted by Rath in The Silent Death, the second novel in the series, and remains his companion until her death in Olympia, the eighth installment.

== See also ==
- List of dog breeds
