= China Marines =

- North China Marines
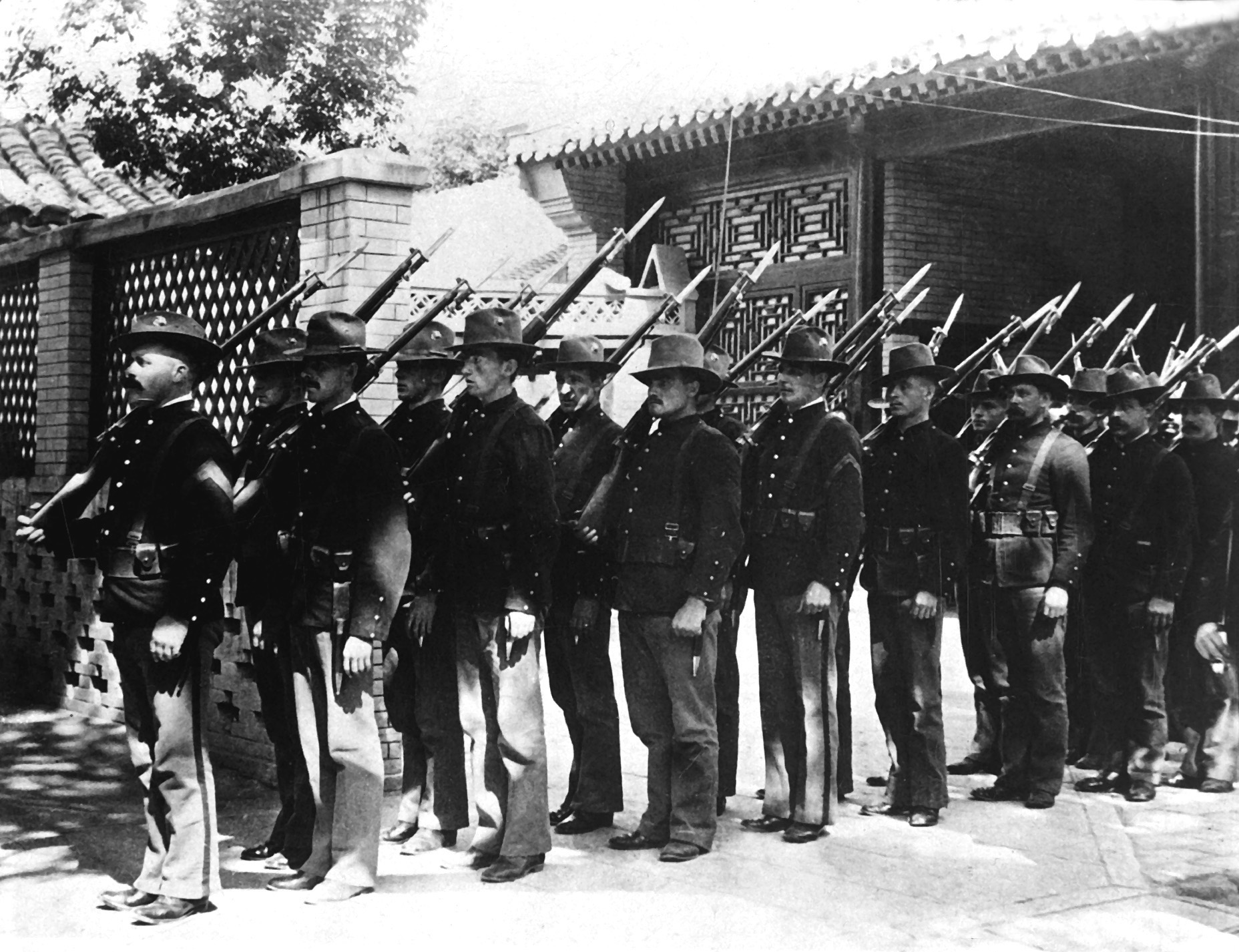
- A detachment of U.S. China Marines, in a relief party, in Peiping, China, during the Boxer Rebellion of 1900.
- Active: 1844–1941, 1900, 1925, 1927–1941
- Disbanded: 1941
- Allegiance: United States of America
- Branch: United States Marine Corps
- Type: Marine Embassy Guard in Beijing, China (1844–1941), 4th Marine Regiment in Shanghai, China (1927–1941)
- Role: Protect American interests and U.S. citizens in China
- Garrison/HQ: Shanghai, Beijing, Tianjin
- Mottos: Semper Fidelis, Gung-ho, (Marine Embassy Guards – In Every Clime and Place), (4th Marine Regiment – Hold High the Torch)
- Mascot: American Bulldog
- Engagements: Boxer Rebellion, Chinese Northern Expedition, Chinese Civil War, Second Sino-Japanese War, World War II

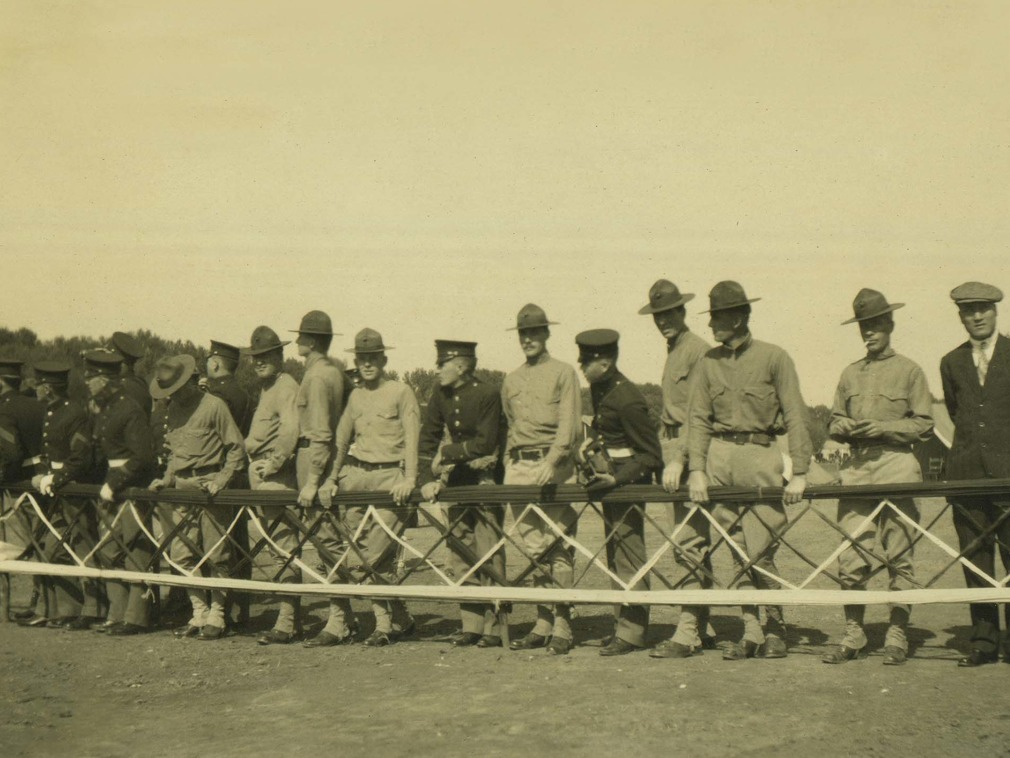
Marines observing a Beiyang Army parade, October 1916

The term China Marines, originally referred to the United States Marines of the 4th Marine Regiment, who were stationed in Shanghai, China from 1927 to 1941 to protect American citizens and their property in the Shanghai International Settlement, during the Northern Expedition and the Second Sino-Japanese War. Those Marines stationed at the embassy in Beijing and the consulate in Tianjin referred to themselves as North China Marines.

Due to the cheap labor available, China Marines lived a relatively comfortable lifestyle, with each squad able to hire Chinese men to do their cleaning and run their errands. This, plus the inexpensive goods available on the local market, made an assignment to the China Marines highly coveted.

Most of the China Marines were withdrawn in November 1941, but the North China Marines in Beijing and Tianjin were scheduled to be withdrawn on December 10. (All weapons and ammunition except rifles and pistols had been crated and shipped by rail to the embarkation port.) However, Imperial Japan attacked the United States on December 7, and the Marine Embassy guards, plus a fourteen-man Naval medical detachment, a total of 203 men, were captured and held as slave labor until the war's end in August 1945. A 204th man, a retired officer who had been living in Beijing and recalled to duty, was immediately released. He continued living in Beijing until he was included in the roundup of civilians and sent to the Weixian Internment Camp in March 1943. He was returned to the U.S. on the exchange ship Teia Maru in September 1943. The last commander of the China Marines was Colonel William W. Ashurst.

With the rapid expansion of the Marine Corps during World War II and the capture of the rest of the 4th Marine Regiment at Corregidor, the surviving China Marines were few in number and highly regarded.

After Japan's surrender, the 1st and 6th Marine Divisions, also known as China Marines, were sent to occupy northern China from 1945 to 1948.

On January 31, 1996, Marines from the 2nd Battalion 5th Marines, as part of the 31st Marine Expeditionary Unit (31st MEU), Special Operations Capable (SOC), made their first visit to Shanghai, China, since World War II. The 31st MEU-SOC visited China again on November 22, 2006, during a port visit to Zhanjiang.

== American Legion China Post One ==
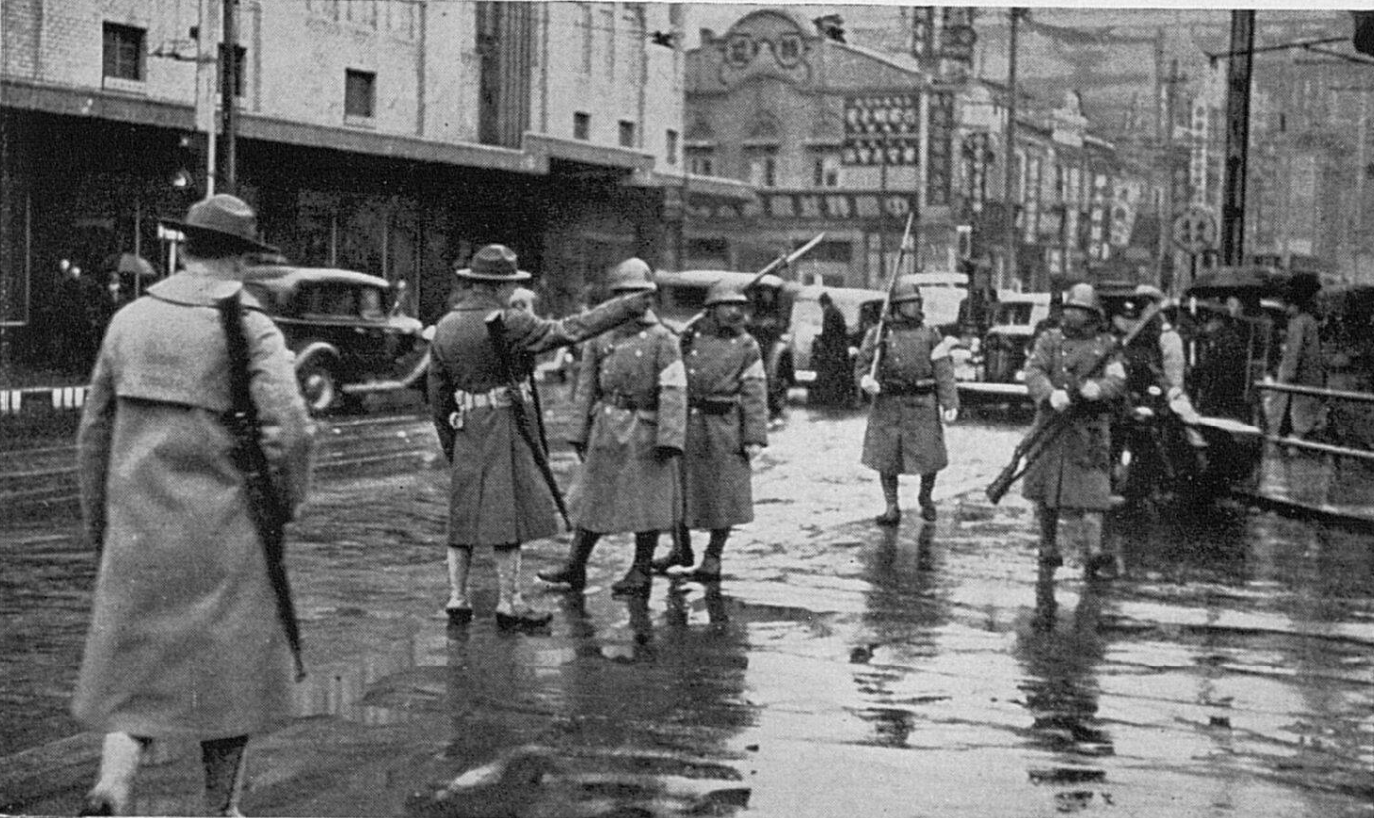
American marines holding up a Japanese patrol trying to enter the Shanghai International Settlement, 1930s

American Legion China Post One, formed in 1919, one year after World War I and chartered by the American Legion on April 20, 1920, was originally named the General Frederick Townsend Ward Post No. 1, China. It is the only post nominally headquartered in a communist country, and has been operating in exile since 1948 — presently in Henderson, Nevada. During the interwar period before exile, China Marines comprised some of China Post membership.

== In popular culture ==
China Post 1 member and Author W. E. B. Griffin often writes of China Marines in his book series The Corps. Book 1 of the series in particular highlights the pre-World War II lives of China Marines. In his Presidential Agent series, he several times makes reference to American Legion China Post No. 1 in Exile as a post comprised in the main of retired military special operators who can be hired for assorted purposes. Some of the characters mentioned in the series are based on real post members.

Neal Stephenson's book Cryptonomicon contains descriptions of the exploits of the China Marines in World War II. The book begins with the evacuation of Shanghai in 1941.

== See also ==
- Yangtze Patrol
- Yangtze Service Medal
- Operation Beleaguer
- China Service Medal
- History of the United States Marine Corps
- List of United States Marine Corps battalions
