= Deadly Assets =

2015 novel by W.E.B. Griffin and William E. Butterworth IV

- First edition
- Author: W.E.B. Griffin and William E. Butterworth IV
- Language: English
- Series: Badge of Honor Series
- Genre: police action novel
- Publisher: G. P. Putnam's Sons
- Publication date: August 4, 2015
- Publication place: United States
- Media type: Print (hardcover)
- Pages: 400 pp (first edition, hardcover)
- ISBN: 9780399171178
- Preceded by: The Last Witness (2013)

Deadly Assets is the twelfth novel in the Badge of Honor series, written by W.E.B. Griffin and William E. Butterworth IV.

== Plot ==
This novel, set in Philadelphia, centers around a young police homicide sergeant, Matt Payne. Payne, nicknamed Wyatt Earp of the Main Line, in past novels has been involved in spectacular and deadly shootouts with criminals. While Payne was always justified in these incidents, influential groups have protested to get Payne either removed from the police force or put into a job that keeps him off the streets. In this book the level of violence in the city has reached a boiling point. This book is full of shady characters and their scheming plots.

== Reviews ==
Book Reporter liked this book, saying, "Griffin and Butterworth once again deliver an action-packed drama that could be picked from any newspaper’s pages in today’s busy world."

Publishers Weekly seemed to like the book, although the review of it did not positively say so. What the review said was, "Payne and his cohorts face long odds in a gritty police series that provides sociological comment but no easy answers."
