= Clandestine Operations (series) =

The Clandestine Operations series is a spy novel published by G. P. Putnam's Sons and written by W. E. B. Griffin and William E. Butterworth IV.

== Top Secret ==
Top Secret
- Publication date: August 5, 2014 (Note: This is the release date for the hardcover edition. Other editions were released on other dates.)
- Pages: 528 pp (first edition, hardcover)
- ISBN: 0399171231

=== Plot ===
This novel centers around a new officer, James Cronley, who at the very end of World War II is recruited for a new intelligence operation and is sent to Germany. Cronley suffers a personal tragedy just before being sent to his new post. It is hoped Cronley can become a great asset to the new organization, which is to become the Central Intelligence Agency. Cronley is put in charge of an operation that includes former German officers and he quickly finds himself in charge of a captured Soviet spy. Many of the characters from Argentina in the Honor Bound series make appearances throughout the novel.

Cronley gets himself into some situations that will seemingly end his career, but with some guidance from those who are more experienced, he seems to have a chance to redeem himself. He has to convince the Soviet spy to turn against his Soviet masters and it is apparent other spies for the Soviets are working right under Cronley's nose to defeat him. This book does not reveal whether Cronley will succeed or fail completely. The next book in the series picks up the story.

=== Reviews ===
Kirkus Reviews liked this book, saying Griffin "fans will not be disappointed." Book Reporter, as well, liked this book, saying, "TOP SECRET is a big book but an easy read, and pages cry out to be turned for the next thrilling chapter."

Publishers Weekly basically said this book will not please everyone, "Those readers expecting action will be disappointed as a host of characters make plans, read secret memos, and engage in interior monologues. Those who are happy with lots of interesting period history, dry humor, and clever scheming will be amply rewarded."

== The Assassination Option ==
Clandestine Operations
- Publication date: December 30, 2014
- Pages: 496 pp (first edition, hardcover)
- ISBN: 978-0399171246

=== Plot ===
The novel centers around Capt. James Cronley, who has been promoted to commander of a new unit in the new Central Intelligence Agency. As the chief of DCI Europe, Cronley has to deal with all sorts of intrigue, much of it involving U.S. government and military personnel unhappy with the creation and power of the new CIA. Cronley, as well as his coworkers and employees, have a new mission: to bring the family of a Soviet informant out of East Germany. In the process, Cronley must fend off attempts to undermine his authority. Cronley's mother was a German national and he runs into numerous German relatives, finding that some of them are not what they seem.

=== Reviews ===
Kirkus Reviews left a relatively positive review, though they pointed out numerous historical errors.

Book Reporter also left a positive review, saying, "It reads well and reminds us of the difficulty posed in intelligence work, especially at the beginning of the Cold War with Russia."

Publishers Weekly has a positive view of this book, saying, "It's a testament to the authors' skill and wide experience that the pages seem to turn themselves."

== Curtain of Death ==
Curtain of Death is the third novel in the Clandestine Operations series. It was published in 2016.

== Death at Nuremberg ==
Clandestine Operations
- Publication date: December 26, 2017
- Media type: Print (hardcover) (Note: Also released as Amazon Kindle edition, audiobook and as a paperback.)
- Pages: 448 pp (first edition, hardcover)
- ISBN: 978-0399176746

Death at Nuremberg is the fourth novel in the Clandestine Operations series

=== Plot ===
This novel centers around Capt. James Cronley, the primary character of all the novels of the series. Cronley has been replaced as chief of DCI Europe to protect the U.S. chief prosecutor in the Nuremberg trials from a rumored Soviet kidnapping. He soon gets charged with hunting down the leadership of Odessa, an organization that helps Nazi war criminals escape to South America. As Cronley gets closer to uncovering the workings of Odessa, he is targeted twice for assassination. Cronley's quest takes him to his mother's home town of Strasbourg and to Vienna. At Strasbourg, he picks up his cousin Luther, who turns out to be a war criminal himself and is taken to Nuremberg. As with the other books in this series, Death at Nuremberg is filled with intrigue as agents of the fledgling CIA work to rid the United States of enemies in Europe.

=== Reviews ===
The Real Book Spy website enjoyed this book, up to a point, saying in its review of it, "While it's a step up from last year's Curtain of Death, this year's offering is still bloated with unnecessary sequences and far too many throwaway characters." The historical novel society was also indifferent in its review of this book, saying, "Readers who enjoy twisty stories and the convoluted politics and maneuverings following war may enjoy this novel, but those seeking tension and suspense may want to look elsewhere."

Elise Cooper, in a review on the BlackFive website, made a more positive evaluation of this book, "Griffin's signature writing style is very evident as he blends humor, espionage, danger, and great characters in his latest novel." A review on the bookreporter website also enjoyed this book.

== The Enemy of My Enemy ==
The Enemy of My Enemy
- Publication date: December 21, 2018
- Media type: Print (hardcover)
- Pages: 400 pp (first edition, hardcover)
- ISBN: 978-0735213067

The Enemy of My Enemy is the fifth novel in the Clandestine Operations Series

=== Plot ===
This novel centers around Capt. James Cronley, the central character of all the novels of the series. Cronley, who captured two notorious Nazi war criminals in Austria in Death at Nuremberg, the previous novel in this series, is charged with recapturing them. They have escaped captivity at Nuremberg. Cronley and his associates find in this novel that there is more involved than recapturing the two men. In the last stages of World War II, as is the premise of this novel, Heinrich Himmler had stashed away much money and gold to establish a Fourth Reich. Cronley finds he is having a difficult time determining who amongst international players he can trust and he escapes an assassination plot that leaves him wondering whether 'the enemy of my enemy' can be trusted as his friend in his quest to find the two Nazis and the treasure Himmler had stashed away.

=== Reviews ===
Judy Gigstad reviewed this novel for Bookreporter and she wrote a positive review, saying, " Fans can only anticipate the next Griffin/Butterworth collaboration."Publishers Weekly showed less enthusiasm for the series. A review from it said it liked this book more than it liked other books in the series, "Newcomers will find this a good entry point, and regular readers will be pleased that the authors have avoided the long-winded prose that's marred recent entries in the series."
