= Honor Bound =

Honor Bound may refer to:

- Honor Bound (1920 film), an American drama film directed by Jacques Jaccard
- Honor Bound (1928 film), an American drama film directed by Alfred E. Green, Jean Harlow's first role
- Honor Bound (1988 film), a film directed by Jeannot Szwarc
- "Honor Bound" (song), a 1985 song written by Tommy Rocco, Charlie Black, and Austin Roberts and recorded by Earl Thomas Conley
- Honor Bound series, a 1993 series of World War II thriller novels written by W.E.B. Griffin
- Honor Bound: Inside the Guantanamo Trials, a 2008 book about the Guantanamo Military Commissions by Kyndra Rotunda
- Honor Bound to Defend Freedom, motto of the Joint Task Force Guantanamo
