= William W. Ashurst =

United States Marine Corps general

William Wallace Ashurst
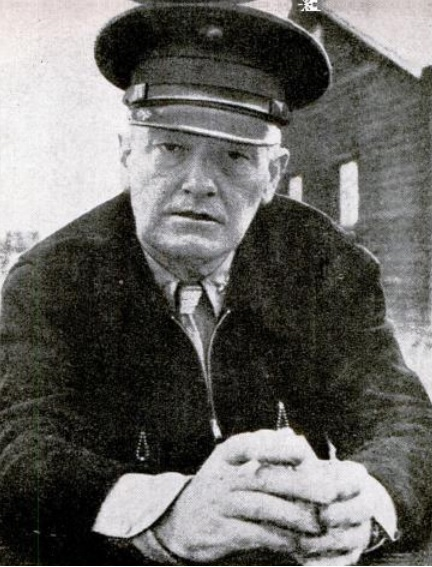
- Colonel Ashurst while in Japanese captivity
- Born: October 30, 1893; Green Ridge, Missouri, US
- Died: February 18, 1952 (aged 58); Beaufort, South Carolina, US
- Military career
- Allegiance: United States
- Branch: United States Marine Corps
- Service years: 1917–1946
- Rank: Brigadier general
- Service number: 0-28
- Commands: China Marines
- Conflicts: World War I: Battle of Belleau Wood (WIA); World War II
- Awards: Silver Star; Legion of Merit; Purple Heart

William Wallace Ashurst (October 30, 1893 – February 18, 1952) was a brigadier general in the United States Marine Corps, who was the last commander of the North China Marine Detachment. He was captured by Japanese forces on December 8, 1941, and was held in captivity for the rest of the war.

== Early years ==
Ashurst was born on October 30, 1893, in Green Ridge, Missouri. He attended the Wentworth Military Academy in Lexington, Missouri, and was commissioned a second lieutenant in the Marine Corps Reserve on May 21, 1917. He was assigned to the Marine Corps Rifle Range in Winthrop, Maryland, before he embarked for France. He received the regular Marine Corps commission in September of the same year.

During World War I, Ashurst fought with the 5th Marine Regiment, 2nd Division within American Expeditionary Force. In June 1918, he was wounded while leading an attack on a German machine gun post during the Battle of Belleau Wood. For his service during the battle, he was decorated for gallantry in action with the Silver Star He was also awarded the Croix de Guerre 1914–1918 with Gilt Star by the government of France.

== Interwar period ==
Ashurst returned to the United States in April 1920 and was assigned to Marine Barracks Portsmouth, New Hampshire. He attended the advanced course at Command and General Staff College at Fort Leavenworth, Kansas, in June 1935 and served on various marine posts. In 1939, he was a battalion commander in the 6th Marine Regiment stationed in San Diego, California. In this capacity, his direct superior was Samuel L. Howard, also a prisoner of war from the Battle of Corregidor.

== World War II ==
In December 1941, then-Colonel Ashurst was commander of the North China Marine Corps Detachment and a commander of the Guard Unit at the United States Embassy in Beijing, China.

When Japan attacked the United States, Ashurst and the marines and U.S. Navy personnel under his command were captured on December 8, 1941, by Japanese forces and interned in a prisoner of war camp in Shanghai until June 1945.

For his actions during the internment in Shanghai, Ashurst was awarded the Legion of Merit. He was subsequently promoted to the rank of brigadier general.

== Death ==
Ashurst died on February 18, 1952, aged 58. He is buried at Arlington National Cemetery, Virginia.

== Legion of Merit citation ==
Action Date: February 1, 1942 – June 19, 1945
Name: William Wallace Ashurst
Service: United States Marine Corps
Rank: Colonel
Division: Prisoner of War (China)
Citation: The President of the United States of America takes pleasure in presenting the Legion of Merit to Colonel William W. Ashurst (MCSN: 0-28), United States Marine Corps, for exceptionally meritorious conduct in the performance of outstanding services to the Government of the United States while serving as the Intermediary of the Shanghai War Prisoners Camp, Shanghai, China, from 1 February 1942 to 15 May 1945, and of the War Prisoners Camp, Fentai, China, from 15 May 1945 to 19 June 1945. Colonel Ashurst displayed outstanding skill, diplomacy and superior judgment in performing his duties, and by his intrepidity in conducting official matters with the Japanese Camp Authorities under extremely unpleasant and humiliating conditions imposed, he contributed greatly in the alleviation of the harsh treatment received by the prisoners at the hands of the Japanese and in the improvement of conditions under which the prisoners were forced to live, thereby being instrumental in lowering the mortality rate of prisoners of war interned. His devotion to duty and tireless effort throughout the long period of imprisonment while suffering from poor health and hardships imposed by the Japanese were in keeping with the highest traditions of the United States Naval Service.

https://web.archive.org/web/20131225213303/http://projects.militarytimes.com/citations-medals-awards/recipient.php?recipientid=75034

== Decorations ==
Here is the ribbon bar of Brigadier General William W. Ashurst, USMC:

1st Row	Silver Star		Legion of Merit	
2nd Row	Purple Heart	Marine Corps Expeditionary Medal	World War I Victory Medal with two battle clasps	Yangtze Service Medal
3rd Row	American Defense Service Medal with Base clasp	Asiatic-Pacific Campaign Medal	World War II Victory Medal	French Croix de guerre 1914–1918 with Gilt Star
