= Leroy and the Old Man =

First edition (publ. Four Winds Press)

LeRoy And The Old Man is a children's novel by W.E. Butterworth, published in 1980.

== Plot ==
LeRoy Chambers is the sole witness to a murder by a local Chicago gang called "The Wolves". To escape police questioning as well as the wrath of the gang who does not want LeRoy to squeal on them, LeRoy is sent by his mother to Pass Christian, Mississippi. It is here that LeRoy is to live with his grandfather. Upon arrival in a New Orleans bus station, LeRoy meets his grandfather for the first time. Living with his grandfather, LeRoy learns how to sleep on a boat, how to catch shrimp and crabs, how to saw lumber, how to buy and sell goods, and even how to drive a truck. LeRoy also learns about the Cajun culture of which is a part of his heritage. However, one thing that LeRoy is not able to learn much about is his father. His father ran away from him and his mother many years ago when LeRoy was in sixth grade. LeRoy's grandfather will not talk about LeRoy's father, stating that he "doesn't have a son".

When the Chicago police came looking for LeRoy in Mississippi to testify as a material witness to the murder he saw, LeRoy has serious reservations. LeRoy understands that he is the only person who saw the Wolves murder an old woman in his housing development. However, LeRoy is scared that if the Wolves see him in court, he may not get out of Chicago alive. LeRoy's grandfather, as well as the local Mississippi sheriff, agree that LeRoy must go to Chicago. However, LeRoy's father (who arranges to surprise LeRoy in a New Orleans restaurant) thinks that LeRoy should steal away to New York City with him. LeRoy, even though he is angered to see his father after so long, is tempted to accompany his dad. Finally, the respect LeRoy has for his grandfather and the new life he has started to build in Pass Christian, Mississippi trumps his father's wishes as well as the fear he has to testify in court. The book ends off with LeRoy boarding an airplane heading towards Chicago.
