= Men at War =

Novel series created by W. E. B. Griffin

Men at War is a series of World War II novels created by W. E. B. Griffin in 1984. More recently, the series' newest novels were co-authored by his son, William E. Butterworth (under the name William E. Butterworth IV). Originally, the series was written under the pseudonym of Alex Baldwin. Some editions of the books listing Baldwin as the author contain cover blurb quotations, attributed to Griffin, praising the books (i.e., he is praising his pseudonymous work under another of his pseudonyms).

The series revolves around the creation of the Office of Strategic Services - a precursor to the CIA - by William "Wild Bill" Donovan at the behest of President Franklin Roosevelt.

== Novels in the series ==
- The Last Heroes (also published as In The Line of Duty) (1984)
- The Secret Warriors (also published as Covert Operations) (1985)
- The Soldier Spies (also published as Give me Liberty) (1986)
- The Fighting Agents (also published as Into Enemy Hands) (1989)
- The Saboteurs (2007)
- The Double Agents (2008)
- The Spymasters (2012)
- The Devil's Weapons(2022)
- Zero Option (2024)
