= Badge of Honor =

The Badge of Honor novel series is a series of novels written by W.E.B. Griffin about the Philadelphia Police Department. Although the books were originally set in the 1970s and early 1980s, and the characters have only aged a few years (Matt Payne is still only 27), Book VIII, Final Justice, moves the story to the post-9/11 era.

== Book order ==
  - Book I, Men in Blue (MB)
  - Book II, Special Operations (SO)
  - Book III, The Victim (V)
  - Book IV, The Witness (W)
  - Book V, The Assassin (A)
  - Book VI, The Murderers (M)
  - Book VII, The Investigators (I)
  - Book VIII, Final Justice (FJ)
  - Book IX, The Traffickers
  - Book X, The Vigilantes
  - Book XI, The Last Witness
  - Book XII, Deadly Assets
  - Book XIII, Broken Trust
  - Book XIV, The Attack

== Premise ==
Matthew Payne, also known by the nicknames "Matt" or "Matty," is the central figure of the series. He is the son of Officer John X. Moffitt, who was killed in the line of duty. His mother, Patricia Moffitt, took a job as a legal secretary to make a living, and met Brewster C. Payne, a prominent Philadelphia attorney and widower. They fell in love and remarried. Brewster Payne legally adopted Matt.

Matt went to private school, where he was an average student with some clashes with the police, and then to the University of Pennsylvania, where he attended Marine Corps ROTC. A minor medical condition prevented Matt from obtaining a commission in the Corps. About the same time, Matt's uncle, "Dutch" Moffitt, was killed. Matt decided to join the Philadelphia Police Department.

Immediately after graduating from the Philadelphia Police Academy, Payne was assigned to Special Operations as Peter Wohl's assistant. This was done to keep him out of trouble; higher-ups in the department figured that Payne would come to his senses and leave the Department in time. Instead, Payne became a hero when he shot and killed a serial killer/rapist, whom Payne found by accident, and who was attempting to run him over. His shooting saved a woman who had been inside the van.

After receiving a high score on the detective exam, Payne was then assigned to the East Division's detective squad and worked routine operations such as retrieving stolen cars. He was reassigned to the Special Investigations section of Special Operations by order of Mayor Carlucci. In The Witness, Payne ended up shooting and being shot by one of a gang of armed robbers, again, not intentionally: Wohl had sent him to escort Mickey O'Hara and to keep O'Hara safe and out of the line of any fire).

Payne's stay in Special Operations was troublesome at times. Wohl reprimanded him for climbing on the 12th floor ledge of the Bellvue-Stratford Hotel to replace a surveillance microphone that had been knocked loose. He has also at times been referred to, sarcastically, as "Sherlock Holmes, Jr." Wohl suspended Payne when he was assigned to Harrisburg and ended up romantically involved with a woman who was providing cover for terrorists/bank robbers; again, he was overruled by Carlucci.

In Final Justice, Payne has become a Detective Sergeant. He solves a murder/rape case in Northwest Philadelphia (but not before breaking the heart of the female detective who becomes his main partner and assistant). He also chaperones a Philadelphia-born movie actor during the latter's return to the city and escorts home an escaped murderer from France. At the end of the book, he suffers burnout and thinks of quitting.

Payne is not married. He was in love with Penny Detweiler, but she died of a heroin overdose.

Payne’s character is suggested to be based on Ken Krieger. Krieger initially went to Delaware County Police Academy, before working in Philadelphia. Krieger worked in a variety of undercover roles and the law enforcement training community. Like Matt Payne, Krieger had been involved in a number of shootings. The Wyatt Earp of the Main Line was his academy's top shot in 1988.

== Other major characters ==
=== Philadelphia Police Department ===
- Taddeus Czernich: Taddeus Czernich is the nominal Commissioner of Police; in reality, he is nothing more than a figurehead for Jerry Carlucci. In Final Justice, Czernich is succeeded by Ralph Mariani (spelt Mariana in later books), an Italian American. The Czernich character, known as The Polack due to his Polish heritage, was based upon Joseph F. O'Neill, who was Mayor Rizzo's hand-picked Police Commissioner. O'Neill was referred to as "Big Red" or "The Irishman".
- Matt Lowenstein: Chief Inspector, Chief of Detectives. He has resented Carlucci's interference with his force, and attempted to resign in The Murderers. He retained the office when Carlucci granted him concessions. This character is based on former Philadelphia Police Inspector Frank Goldberg.
- Dennis "Denny" Coughlin: Chief Inspector, later Deputy Commissioner of Police. Infatuated with Matt Payne's mother Patricia, he serves as 'godfather' and 'rabbi' to Matt, guiding him through his career as a police detective despite being reluctant to see him on the force, as a debt of gratitude to his friend and late partner John X. Moffitt.
- Jesus Martinez: Detective, Special Operations Division. He started off partnered with Charley McFadden as Narcotics undercover detectives. The two of them were highly effective, but their undercover assignments ended when they caught the murderer of Highway Patrol Captain Richard "Dutch" Moffitt in Men in Blue. The publicity ended their Narcotics careers, and Martinez briefly went undercover as an officer at the Airport Unit to catch a crooked corporal in The Assassin. After that stint, Martinez was assigned to Special Operations. Martinez and McFadden are best friends as well as partners. However, Martinez does not like Matt Payne, whom he regards as a spoiled rich kid.
- Charley McFadden: A large Irishman, he was Jesus Martinez's partner in Narcotics. He was transferred to Special Operations while Martinez went to the Airport Unit, and continues to work in Special Operations as a detective.
- Dave Pekach: Captain, Highway Patrol Unit. A former Narcotics Lieutenant, he was given command of Highway Patrol because Mayor Jerry Carlucci thinks that the former number two man in Highway, Captain Mike Sabara, "looks like a concentration camp guard in uniform." Investigating a series of burglaries at the Peebles home, he won the affections of Martha Peebles.
- Jason Washington: Lieutenant, Homicide Squad (previously Detective, Homicide Squad and Special Operations and Sergeant, Special Operations Investigation Section) is regarded by his peers, and himself, as Philadelphia's finest Homicide detective "between Key West, Florida and Bangor, Maine." He is physically imposing, but sharply dressed; his nickname among other police is "The Black Buddha." He speaks with a highly educated vocabulary. He is a master of using psychology with subjects under interrogation and in determining the anomalies in their stories. He would be regarded as vain if he was not able to back up his words with actions.

Washington did not want to be transferred from Homicide to Special Operations because, as a Homicide detective, he earned considerable overtime pay. However, Inspector Wohl convinced him that he would be able to work as many hours as he wanted. In Final Justice, he is transferred back to Homicide as a lieutenant. Washington’s wife Martha is ironically named similarly to the wife of America's first president. She is said to be a reputable art dealer, and is forever dragging her husband to events in the art world.

- Peter Wohl: Inspector, Special Operations Division. In his career he served in the Highway Patrol as the youngest corporal in the unit; he was also the youngest sergeant, lieutenant, captain, and staff inspector in the Philadelphia Police Department. He has a reputation for honesty and for fighting corruption; before he was assigned to Special Operations, Wohl's investigation sent a corrupt Judge Moses Findermann to prison. Wohl insists that his officers do things the smart and effective way and has chastised Matt Payne several times for doing courageous but "stupid" things, including suspending Payne one time (until Mayor Carlucci overrode him). Wohl is the son of Augustus Wohl, the retired Chief of Detectives. Augustus served as "rabbi" for several officers, including Carlucci. Peter is unmarried, though he has an on-again off-again romantic relationship with Amy Payne.

=== City of Philadelphia ===
==== Jerry Carlucci ====
Jerry Carlucci is the former Police Commissioner and Mayor of Philadelphia. He is clearly modeled on Frank Rizzo. Like Rizzo, Carlucci served 26 years as a police officer and held "every rank but policewoman." Despite being mayor and having a police commissioner under him, Carlucci insists on hands-on direction of the Police Department. In Final Justice, Carlucci is succeeded by African American Alvin Martin, who seems to be based on John F. Street. In an apparent disconnect, in The Traffickers, which begins approximately 30 days after the end of Final Justice, Mayor Carlucci is in full control, and remains so through the end of the series.

=== Philadelphia Mafia ===
==== Paulo Cassandro ====
Paulo Cassandro is the underboss of the Philadelphia Mafia. He is the owner of Classic Livery, which provides limousines to the public; he also serves as enforcer to Vincenzo Savarese, along with his brother, Pietro.

==== Vincenzo Savarese ====
Vincenzo Savarese is the head of Philadelphia's Mafia family. Although he has refined manners and is an accomplished violinist, Savarese is capable of ordering, albeit indirectly, a person's death. Savarese has a daughter who is married to a builder and is not involved in crime, and a granddaughter on whom he dotes. When his granddaughter was raped by a rogue Narcotics cop, Savarese prevailed on Brewster Payne to have his daughter, Dr. Amy Payne, take care of her. He also arranged for the man who sold her drugs to be kidnapped and left to starve to death in the dark.

== Minor characters ==
=== Amy Payne ===
Amy Payne is Matt Payne's older sister. She has a double doctorate, in pure mathematics and in medicine, and works as a psychiatrist. Among her patients have been Penelope Detweiler and (reluctantly) the granddaughter of Vincenzo Savarese. She has also assisted the Special Operations Division in profiling the Northwest Serial Rapist and an insane but intelligent man trying to kill the Vice President. Amy Payne is prone to being distracted as a driver, makes snap psychological judgments of her brother, and is annoyed when she runs into the bureaucracy of the Philadelphia Police Department. She is romantically involved with Peter Wohl.

=== Penny Detweiler ===
Penelope Detweiler was the only daughter of Richard Detweiler, the majority stockholder in Nesfoods. She was involved with Anthony DeZego, "Tony the Zee," a minor Philadelphia mobster, and was present when DeZego was murdered in The Victim. Her relationship with DeZego led to her addiction to heroin. She was hospitalized in a private sanitarium in Nevada. When she returned to Philadelphia, Detweiler had a brief relationship with Matt Payne. She died of a heroin overdose in The Murderers.

=== Mickey O'Hara ===
Michael J. "Mickey" O'Hara is a former police reporter for the Philadelphia Bulletin. He is regarded as one of the best police reporters on the East Coast, and he is held in high regard by the police for several reasons, including listening to their side of controversial events. O'Hara drives a car equipped with several police band receivers (at the time the series was written, computer-controlled scanners were not available). In this, he resembles Larry Krebs, the former police reporter for WMAL in Washington, D.C. Although O'Hara is held in high esteem by the police, he has published stories that the police wanted played down, such as the arrest of a crooked police captain. He has also been on the site and taken photos when significant events took place, such as when Matt Payne shot and killed the Northwest Serial Rapist (in Special Operations). In The Vigilantes, O'Hara had left the Bulletin and had signed on to run a local crime information website known as 'CrimeFreePhilly.com'.

=== Martha Peebles ===
Martha Peebles, in her late thirties, was the heir to a fortune based on anthracite coal mining. Her father disinherited her brother, Stephen, for being a homosexual. Stephen stayed with Martha, but was forced to move out after several cases of pilferage. Martha asked for police assistance to protect her home. Captain Dave Pekach was sent to respond for public relations reasons. The two fell in love and Pekach moved in with Martha; they later married. Martha doted on Pekach, and one of his biggest problems is preventing her from buying things for her "Precious."
