= Honor Bound series =

World War II thriller book series

The Honor Bound series is a World War II thriller book series by W. E. B. Griffin, whose latest four volumes were co-authored with his son, William E. Butterworth IV. It takes place mostly in Argentina, but also deals with internal struggles in the Nazi Party as the war escalates. Griffin based the books on historical events and his own experiences in Argentina.

== Books ==
=== Honor Bound (1993) ===
Cletus Frade returns from a flying sortie on Guadalcanal and crashlands. After he recovers, he learns he has been awarded the Distinguished Flying Cross and is being sent home to participate in a war bonds tour. However, when he reaches the United States, he is approached and recruited into the OSS by Colonel Graham. His mission is twofold; posing as an employee of Howell Petroleum, he and his team will attempt to sink the Reine de la Mer, a German replenishment ship posing as a neutral freighter; he will also try to reestablish contact with his estranged father, who is among the most powerful men in Argentina and is the architect of the impending military coup to overthrow Ramón Castillo, the pro-German President of Argentina. His team members are Tony Pelosi (demolitions) and David Ettinger (radioman).

Ettinger discovers from Jewish refugees living in and around Buenos Aires that the Nazis are ransoming Jews in concentration camps, accepting bribe money from their overseas families for their safe passage out of Germany. The OSS orders the team to verify this information.

Meanwhile, Hans-Peter von Wachtstein, a young Luftwaffe pilot, is selected to escort the remains of the late Capitan Jorge Alejandro Duarte back to Argentina. A neutral observer attached to the Eastern Front, Duarte was flying a Fieseler Storch against the rules of neutral observation and was shot down. Peter's father, a Generalleutnant in the General Staff, reveals that he is one of a group of officers that is duty-bound to pursue the removal of Adolf Hitler. To this end he sends considerable amounts of money with Peter as he escorts the casket to Argentina. Peter meets Juan Perón, who introduces him to the Duartes and their extended family.

Relations between Cletus and his host, Enrico Mallín, are strained, and become even worse when Mallin's daughter, Dorotea, takes an obvious liking to Cletus. Cletus meets his father at long last, and his father is finally able to explain that he did not abandon Cletus willfully; he was prevented from entering the U.S. by Cletus' grandfather. Frade insists that Cletus move out of the Mallín home and into his guest house. Coincidentally, Capitan Duarte's mother, Beatrice, has already sent Peter von Wachtstein to stay there. An awkward moment between two opposing officers turns into a truce, as they find they have more in common with each other than anyone else in Buenos Aires, and they become fast friends. Later, when Cletus's assassination is ordered, Peter warns him, and Cletus is able to defend himself and kill his attackers, but not before they kill the long-time housekeeper, Enrico Rodríguez's sister.

Cletus and his team are able to identify the replenishment ship, but they realize that there is no way to accomplish their mission without getting killed — the ship is obviously well-armed. When the local OSS station chief accuses him of cowardice, it is only the arrival of the destroyer USS Alfred Thomas and the intervention of Colonel Graham that save the mission. The OSS team is augmented by Chief Petty Officer Oscar Schultz, the ship's chief radioman, who deliberately misses the boat when the Thomas sails. Cletus and his team devise a plan to illuminate the Reine de la Mer at nighttime using incendiary devices dropped from a plane (which Cletus is flying, and from which Pelosi is dropping the incendiaries). This allows a hidden American submarine to enter the bay and destroy the replenishment ship, as well as the U-boat alongside her. Cletus and Pelosi are shot down but are promptly rescued.

=== Blood and Honor (1996) ===
On leave at his grandfather's house in New Orleans, Cletus Frade is contacted by Colonel Graham and informed that his father has been assassinated. Instead of returning to Argentina as a naval attaché in uniform, he will assume the cover story of having been discharged from the Marine Corps in order to claim his inheritance. When he does return to Argentina and begin to make preparations for his father's funeral, he discovers that as a result of one of their very few trysts, Dorotea is pregnant.

Meanwhile, the officers allied with el Coronel Frade are panicked, for among the belongings passing to Cletus Frade is the operations order for Esquema Azul (Outline Blue), the planned military coup against the Castillo government. They contact Cletus and are relieved when he willingly passes it to them.

Cletus finds himself tasked with two difficult missions — infiltrate a second OSS team and their radar set from Brazil; and fly an airplane (a Lockheed Lodestar) that he has never flown before from Brazil to Argentina for the use of the rebelling officers.

Peter von Wachtstein stumbles upon the ransoming operation from his end and is definitely able to confirm to Cletus and the OSS that it exists. Ettinger decides to investigate further and is assassinated, making von Wachtstein the only source of information on the ransoming scheme. Peter finds out that the money is part of Operation Phoenix, the plan to hide high-ranking Nazis in South America should the Third Reich fall. He also finds out that several officers with access to the "special fund" are using it for personal gain instead, which further revolts him. He decides to reveal to Cletus Frade where a shipment of money is being landed from the new replenishment ship; Cletus dispatches one of the new OSS team's men with a camera to document the landing, and sends Enrico Rodríguez and another retired cavalry sergeant to guard him. However, Enrico recognizes the Germans who ordered the death of el Coronel Frade and his sister on the beach and shoots them both dead, intentionally barely missing Peter von Wachtstein.

The military coup proceeds as planned (however accelerated due to el Coronel Frade's death) and General Arturo Rawson becomes the new President of Argentina, with no small help from Cletus Frade.

=== Secret Honor (1999) ===
The Nazi regime decides to investigate the killings of their operatives in Argentina; it seems possible that there is a double agent in the German embassy. Peter is among those singled out for suspicion and is ordered back to Germany. While in Germany, he is reunited with his father and with his old friend Claus von Stauffenberg, who relates to him the plan to eliminate Adolf Hitler. Peter is ordered back to Argentina when it becomes apparent that he has gotten Alicia Carzina-Cormano pregnant. When Peter returns, one of the investigators, Korvettenkapitän Karl Boltitz of the Abwehr, reveals to him that he knows he is the traitor, and directs him to commit suicide by crashing his plane, thereby sparing his father suspicion and possibly death. However, when it is revealed to Boltitz by Ambassador von Lutzenberg that he and Peter share the confidence of Vice Admiral Wilhelm Canaris, Peter's life is spared.

Cletus Frade and Dorotea Mallín are married, and it turns into a grand affair that encompasses most of Argentine upper society.

=== Death and Honor (2008) (with William E. Butterworth IV) ===
Peter von Wachtstein reveals to Cletus Frade that Korvettenkapitän Boltitz is now "one of them", and furthermore that Canaris, head of the Abwehr, is confirmed to be unsympathetic to the Nazi cause. Cletus requests that Colonel Graham visit him personally in Argentina to impart this new information, which confirms information developed in Europe.

Colonel Graham then reveals to Cletus that the U.S. President and "Wild Bill" Donovan would like Cletus to set up a civilian airline in Argentina, using surplus aircraft from the Army Air Corps. Donovan hopes the assets of the airline will be available for OSS use; Cletus Frade suspects the President is trying to put pressure on Pan American-Grace Airways, which has a near monopoly on South American air travel. He nevertheless is able to form the airline in relatively short order, but staffs it with Argentine pilots and staff under pressure from the Argentine government, which makes it unlikely to be usable by the OSS.

The German commercial attaché to the Buenos Aires embassy, Wilhelm Frogger, and his wife desert their post when ordered back to Germany. They pass into Cletus Frade's control, and he smuggles them to a small estancia in the mountains. It turns out that their son, a captured Afrika Korps lieutenant colonel, may have information on the plot to eliminate Hitler. Cletus travels to the States (under guise of acquiring Air Transport Ratings for himself and his pilots) and is key in getting Oberstleutnant Frogger to cooperate with his American captors.

Peter von Wachtstein, still under suspicion of being a double agent, is recruited to assist in the landing of yet another shipment of money for Operation Phoenix. Although he is carefully watched during the entire operation and cannot slip away to notify Cletus, he does make note of the fact that mountain troops from the Argentine Army appear to be assisting the Nazis who deliver the shipment. He relates this to Cletus afterward.

Later, when the mountain estancia is attacked and it seems the Froggers were killed, Enrico Rodríguez reveals that he spirited them away safely. He also provides photographic evidence that Juan Perón led both Argentine mountain troops and undercover Nazi operatives to the estancia to kill the Froggers. This, coupled with other evidence, leads Cletus Frade to confront Perón and threaten to out him in front of the rest of the Argentine officer corps should the Nazis take any action against him or his family.

=== The Honor of Spies (2009) (with William E. Butterworth IV) ===
The beginning of The Honor of Spies overlaps with the end of Death And Honor, as the Argentine mountain troops assault Cletus Frade's mountain estancia in Tandil and Cletus confronts Perón. Immediately following this, another unsuccessful attempt is made on Cletus's life.

The German Embassy in Buenos Aires is still reeling from the implications of the defection of the Froggers. A senior SS operative, Brigadeführer-SS Manfred von Deitzberg, who took part in the previous investigations into the mysterious killings, returns to Argentina, in part to locate the Froggers, in part to continue to uncover the traitor or traitors in the embassy, and finally to continue work on the plan to relocate the Nazi leadership to Argentina in the event of setbacks on the European front. Meanwhile, back in Europe, the plan to eliminate Hitler (referred to as Operation Valkyrie), secretly picks up speed, even as the Nazis plan and execute the rescue of Benito Mussolini.

In Portugal, Graham and Allen Dulles, Graham's OSS counterpart in Europe, meet with Canaris' deputy, who offers the services of Oberstleutnant Reinhard Gehlen, who has been collecting intelligence on the Soviets, and is willing to share it with the Americans in exchange for American assistance in relocating his men and their families to Argentina, in the same way the Nazi party leadership envisions.

Cletus Frade is forced to move his operations to an estancia in Mendoza Province after the German commercial attaché's wife becomes mentally unstable and violent. He then takes delivery of three Lockheed Constellations for his airline, and flies one to Portugal, where he picks up two of Gehlen's officers disguised as clergy and returns with them and their families to Argentina. Only later does he realize that one is a Nazi true believer, who Gehlen sent to Argentina to distance him from Operation Valkyrie.

The political and military situation in Argentina is escalating, as Perón, the German-sympathizing commander of the mountain regiment, and the Germans in the embassy plan an armed incursion against Cletus Frade, and Coronel Martin, of the Bureau of Internal Security (BIS), and President Rawson choose to ally themselves with Frade, while not wishing to plunge Argentina into civil war. Von Deitzberg makes moves to acquire the bulk of the illicit funds from ransoming Jews from Germany, but unexpectedly encounters the other officer Gehlen sent to Argentina, who recognizes him and eliminates him. It is strongly hinted that Perón and his paramour, Evita, come into possession of a large portion of this money.

As the situation intensifies, Dorotea gives birth to a healthy boy, just as Cletus prepares to accompany President Rawson to confront the commander of the mountain regiment, who is leading his unit towards the estancia. The commander and his deputies, when confronted by President Rawson attempt to place him under arrest at which point Cletus kills the commander. The deputy attempts to draw a pistol, whereupon Cletus kills him also. Cletus turns the advancing column over to a man who supports President Rawson and the column return to its home base thus averting a coup d'état. The President then deliberates on how best to deal with Perón.

=== Victory and Honor (2011) (with William E. Butterworth IV) ===
Victory and Honor jumps ahead in the narrative timeline to shortly after the German surrender on May 7, 1945. The status quo of many of the characters has changed drastically from the last novel. Cletus has been promoted to Lieutenant Colonel and has a second son, Cletus Junior; Peter von Wachtstein's father is presumed dead following the failure of the 20 July Plot, and Peter is himself in US custody as a prisoner of war; and as President Truman bends to pressure from within the Joint Chiefs, Allen Dulles warns Clete and his men that the OSS is on borrowed time and might be disestablished at any moment. Equally troubling is that current Treasury Secretary Henry Morgenthau seems determined to uncover the Gehlen personnel that Clete has been smuggling out of Europe via his airline, potentially compromising all the intelligence they have so far provided concerning Soviet Union, especially their agents who have penetrated the Manhattan Project. Dulles, Graham and Clete have agreed to keep the Gehlen Organization secret from Donovan or the President for fear of compromise to the Soviets, despite the fact that they all are outside the chain of command and risking their careers (in what could be potentially called treason).

Forces are set into motion to assume control of the OSS, and specifically Clete's operations, and Clete himself is cornered into returning to the US and appears to be headed for court-martial. However, President Truman reveals to Clete that he has decided to revive the OSS as the CIA, and will be taking a much more aggressive stance towards the Soviets than his predecessor. Clete is given presidential direction to continue the Gehlen smuggling operation in Argentina without assistance until the CIA is fully formed and able to assume guidance of him.

== Main characters ==
=== Lieutenant Colonel Cletus Howell Frade ===
A young Marine pilot who is returned from the Battle of Guadalcanal to the States, ostensibly to join a war bonds tour. However, he is approached by Colonel Alejandro Fredrico Graham to join the OSS due to the fact that his estranged father is one of the most powerful men in Argentina.

Cletus's father, el Coronel Jorge Guillermo Frade, fell in love with the daughter of oil magnate Cletus Marcus Howell on a trip to the United States, and married her. Their one child, Cletus Howell Frade, was born following a difficult pregnancy. Against doctor's orders, she became pregnant again, killing her; Mr. Howell blamed el Coronel Frade for her death and engineered his expulsion from the United States. Cletus was raised by his uncle and aunt, Jim and Martha Howell, on their ranch in Texas, never again meeting his father until his recruitment in the OSS.

Cletus is placed in charge of an OSS team, whose mission in Argentina is to destroy a ship replenishing German U-boats in Argentine waters. His rekindled relationship with his father assists him in the completion of that mission. When his father is killed by order of the Germans, Cletus inherits his estate and gradually becomes a prominent, powerful member of Argentine society, while still serving covertly as an OSS operative. He also meets and marries Dorotea Mallín, the daughter of one of his grandfather's business associates in Argentina, and in the fifth novel of the series, fathers a child with her.

Frade started his own private airline in Argentina known as South American Airways. This airline is actually an OSS front allowing Colonel Frade the ability to transport agents and other people and goods around the world without attracting attention as well as allowing him to employ former soldiers and keep weapons such as Thompson submachine guns around presumably for security.

Frade attended Texas A&M University and Tulane University. His OSS codename is "Tex."

=== Major Hans-Peter von Wachtstein, Graf von Wachtstein ===
A young Luftwaffe pilot who previously served in the Condor Legion during the Spanish Civil War and therefore speaks Spanish. He is a baron, son to Generalleutnant Graf (Count) Karl-Friedrich von Wachtstein, who serves on the staff of the Oberkommando der Wehrmacht. He is also the holder of the Knight's Cross of the Iron Cross ("awarded by der Führer himself"), and is an unabashed ladies' man. When he is selected to escort to Argentina the remains of the late Capitan Jorge Alejandro Duarte (who happens to be Cletus Frade's cousin), his father confides in him that the only hope for the German aristocracy to survive postwar is to assassinate Adolf Hitler.

From this moment on, Peter's duty as an officer and gentleman who is honor-bound to serve Germany, and not the Nazi regime, continually collides with the reality of operating under constant Nazi control and scrutiny. He meets and befriends Cletus Frade in Argentina, despite their status as opposing officers, and ends up warning Cletus of an attempt on his life. Cletus then assists Peter in moving the Graf's money to Argentine bank accounts. This leads to Peter becoming Cletus's single most valuable source in the German embassy in Argentina, code-named "Galahad". Despite his lineage and heroic service record, he falls under suspicion of being a traitor.

Peter falls in love with and marries Alicia Carzino-Cormano near the end of Secret Honor, despite his misgivings that his double agent status will very probably lead to his execution. In the two subsequent novels he is treated more as a supporting character, as the series focuses more closely on Cletus. He resurfaces in Victory and Honor as a POW in the US, where he fled after the failure of the 20 July plot and the fall of Nazi Germany. He accompanies Clete to Germany on a subsequent mission and insists on infiltrating into Soviet-held Pomerania to locate his father's remains and locate his remaining family. Despite what appear to be monumental odds of him surviving this ordeal, he does, and is able to return to Argentina, Alicia, and his new child. Based on eyewitness reports of his father's execution, he ascends to the title of Graf von Wachstein, and Alicia becomes the new Grafin (or Countess).

(Hans-Peter's title is a case of the authors confusing the British system of peerages, with German titles. In Germany, nobility and titles (except for most reigning titles) were always inherited equally by all legitimate descendants of a nobleman. Hence Peter would always have been a Graf (Count) rather than a Freiherr (Baron)).

== Supporting characters ==
=== Major Maxwell Ashton IV ===
Then Captain Ashton (codename "Snoopy", and later "Bacardi") is in command of a second OSS team into which Cletus Frade infiltrates in Argentina during the events of Blood and Honor. His team consists of First Lieutenant (later Captain) Madison R. Sawyer III ("Polo"), Technical Sergeant (later Master Sergeant) Jerry Ferris, Staff Sergeant (later Technical Sergeant) Jerry O'Sullivan, and Sergeant (later Staff Sergeant) Sigfried Stein. Their mission is to observe Samborombón Bay by radar to detect German replenishment ships or submarines. Ashton is later exfiltrated to Brazil and returns officially as a military attaché to the embassy in Buenos Aires.

Despite his very American-sounding name, Ashton is actually half-Cuban and speaks Spanish fluently. He is by his own admission not a brave man, and abhors the thought of parachuting behind the lines or infiltrating Argentina by rubber boat.

=== Korvettenkapitän Karl Boltitz ===
A former U-boat officer who now works for the Abwehr under Wilhelm Canaris. Originally sent to assist in the investigation of a traitor in the German Embassy in Buenos Aires, he realizes that his loyalties do not lie with the Nazi regime and allies himself with Peter von Wachtstein after he discovers that he is a double agent. In Death and Honor he is reassigned as the naval attaché in Buenos Aires, with a promotion to Kapitän zur See. In OSS communications his codename is "Popeye", later "Johnpaul" (as of The Honor Of Spies), in reference to John Paul Jones. In Victory and Honor it is revealed that he is in a serious relationship with Clete's sister, Beth.

=== Alicia Carzina-Cormano de von Wachtstein ===
Daughter of Claudia Carzino-Cormano, and Peter von Wachtstein's lover (and later wife). She is smitten with Peter at first sight, but his involvement in the war and the specific dangers that he faces terrify her. When she becomes pregnant as the result of a tryst, Peter is recalled from a trip to Germany to return to Argentina and marry her. She is not at all displeased to learn that she receives the title "Baroness" following her marriage. She and Dorotea Mallín de Frade are best friends since childhood, which is a convenient way to engineer meetings between Peter and Cletus Frade when necessary. After the assumed death of Peter's father in Victory and Honor, she is referred to as "Countess" rather than "Grafin".

=== Claudia Carzino-Cormano ===
A widow who owns Estancia Santa Catalina, the large estate adjacent to that of el Coronel Jorge Guillermo Frade. After the death of their respective spouses, Claudia and el Coronel become lovers and in fact are married in all but name. Cletus Frade finds out later that this is because if his father had married Claudia, the right of inheritance would go to her rather than to him. Despite this, she and Cletus have a very strong friendship, at times appearing like mother and son. She has two daughters, Alicia and Isabela.

=== Isabela Carzino-Cormano ===
Sister of Alicia Carzino-Cormano de von Wachtstein, and Claudia Carzino-Cormano's older daughter. She was affianced to Capitan Jorge Alejandro Duarte, and chose to cast herself as a grieving almost-widow after his death. Her icy reception of Cletus Frade during their initial meeting led him to dub her "El Bitcho", a name that has spread to many of the main characters and their hired staff by the third book. She often appears fascinated with the German officers who visit her estate, and her behavior towards them is sometimes unfavorably compared to that of an animal in heat. Her behavior also sorely tests her mother's patience.

=== Brigadeführer-SS Ritter Manfred von Deitzberg ===
First Deputy Adjutant to Heinrich Himmler, head of the SS. Von Deitzberg's family fell from aristocratic privilege following reparations after World War I; consequently, he sought rapid promotion by transferring from the Wehrmacht to the SS (in The Honor Of Spies, this is retconned to suggest he was transferred for misconduct). He became involved in the illicit ransoming of Jews to escape Germany, and the diversion of those funds for personal use. He is seconded back to the Wehrmacht in the uniform of a Generalmajor to investigate the shooting of German Embassy officials and to uncover the traitor in the Buenos Aires embassy. He returns later under cover to personally oversee the preparation of safe havens for Nazi leaders in Argentina. While performing these missions, he makes moves to take sole possession of the illicit ransoming funds, but is eliminated. It is strongly hinted that Coronel Juan Perón assumes possession of a great deal of this money subsequently.

=== Humberto Valdez Duarte ===
Father of the late Capitan Jorge Alejandro Duarte, whose remains Peter von Wachtstein escorted home from Europe. He is married to Beatrice Frade de Duarte, el Coronel Frade's sister, who after the death of her son has gone slightly mad and is detached from reality due to her medications. He is also the managing director of the Anglo-Argentine Bank, which proves invaluable to both Cletus and Peter in the pursuit of several of their missions.

=== Staff Sergeant David Ettinger ===
Codenamed "Sarnoff", Dave Ettinger is a former counterintelligence agent in the U.S. Army's Counterintelligence Corps, and a Jewish refugee from Nazi Germany. He is attached to Cletus Frade's OSS team as a radioman, but also for his ties to the growing Jewish community in Argentina. While in Buenos Aires, his investigations lead to the discovery of a ransom scheme where Jews living outside Germany can pay for their relatives to be released from concentration camps and emigrated to Argentina. This investigation, codenamed "Lindbergh" by the OSS, becomes a priority for Frade's team, and is confirmed by von Wachtstein. Ettinger is assassinated by order of the Germans when he disobeys Frade's orders and leaves the safety of the estancia to investigate further.

=== Coronel (Retired) Jorge Guillermo Frade ===
A powerful Argentine landowner, prominent former military officer, and businessman who is clearly in line to become the next President of Argentina following a military coup that he is planning. He is the father of Cletus Howell Frade, but has not seen him since shortly after his birth. He owns several estancias, large ranches, in Argentina and neighboring Uruguay, as well as interests in vineyards, radio stations, and various other enterprises. He is at first sympathetic to the Germans, having attended the Kriegsschule while in the service, but his reunion with his son, who is a serving officer in the U.S. Marine Corps and the OSS, tilts him towards the Americans. He substantially aids his son in his mission to sink a German submarine replenishment ship, for which he is targeted for assassination by the Germans. His death has the unintended effect of turning much of the Argentine officer corps against the Germans (with the conspicuous exception of Coronel Juan Domingo Perón), and accelerates the planned military coup against the sitting president, Ramon Castillo. After his death, his estate is inherited completely by Cletus Frade.

=== Colonel Alejandro Fredrico Graham ===
Cletus Frade's immediate superior in the OSS, codename "Aggie", a reserve colonel in the Marine Corps who in civilian life is a railroad and shipping magnate, and currently serves as the Assistant Director for Western Hemisphere Operations of the OSS. He is torn between admiration of and frustration with Frade, who he recognizes both as an irreplaceable asset and a loose cannon. In most appearances during the series, he is either defending Frade to Wild Bill Donovan or trying to rein him in, sometimes with harsh verbal haranguing. He identifies himself as Tex-Mex and speaks fluent Spanish. He is identified in Death and Honor as one of two OSS officers to whom Donovan would potentially pass leadership of the OSS.

=== Cletus Marcus Howell, Esq. ===
Owner and chairman of the board of Howell Petroleum, namesake to his grandson, and a key figure in Cletus Frade's life prior to his joining the Marine Corps and the OSS. A tall, thin, sharp-featured septuagenarian, he blames el Coronel Frade for the death of his daughter subsequent to Cletus's birth. The loss of his daughter leads him to pull legal and administrative strings to have Frade barred from entering the US to reclaim Cletus. His son James, and James' wife, Martha, then raise Cletus as their own alongside their two daughters. He is an acquaintance of Colonel Graham, and therefore becomes at least partially aware of Cletus's OSS operations from the beginning — in fact, Cletus and Pelosi's first covers in Argentina are as Howell Petroleum employees. Despite his deep distrust and outspoken hatred of "all things Argentine", as Cletus puts it, he begrudgingly changes course and accepts Dorotea into the family when Cletus informs him that he is to be a grandfather. He appears a product of a certain generation, with subtly racial overtones to his opinions (noticeable when he refers to Ettinger as "the Jew").

Several times during the series, when Graham, Donovan, or other people are considering taking disciplinary action against Cletus, they are at least mindful of the fact that Mr. Howell is a very prominent businessman, with senators, newspaper owners, and other important people in his social circle, and probably would bring his considerable influence to bear in protecting Cletus.

=== Milton Liebermann ===
Ostensibly a legal attaché to the U.S. Embassy in Buenos Aires, he is in fact the FBI Special Agent In Charge in Argentina. A middle-aged man who has the appearance of a banker or lawyer, Milton is in fact a highly skilled intelligence operative. Despite the turf war between the OSS and FBI in the Western Hemisphere, he and Cletus Frade often find themselves comparing notes and sharing information. He is referred to by Cletus Frade in OSS communications as "Hoover", after the FBI Director.

=== Ambassador Manfred Alois Graf von Lutzenberger ===
Senior diplomat in the German Embassy in Buenos Aires, and secretly a family friend and ally of the von Wachtsteins. His authority is a help in deflecting some of the suspicion that falls on Peter von Wachstein, and he helps von Wachtstein smuggle and hide family money into Argentina.

=== Dorotea Mallín de Frade ===
A young Argentine woman, who when Cletus Frade meets her, is barely nineteen. He privately dubs her the "Virgin Princess", being smitten with her upon first sight, which feeling is entirely reciprocal. Her father, Enrico Mallín, is highly protective of her and fiercely opposes the relationship; the point becomes moot when she becomes pregnant and Cletus Frade marries her. She quickly assumes not only the duties and responsibilities of the wife of a highly wealthy socialite and businessman, but also becomes extremely involved in Cletus's work as an OSS agent. She is portrayed as a beautiful woman but is as tough and profane as any man. She is also as well armed with it being mentioned by Cletus that she carries a revolver in her purse. Her intimate knowledge of OSS operations in Argentina concerns Cletus, as well as Colonel Graham and General Donovan at the OSS, but they all agree that she is a more than capable asset to the operation. In The Honor Of Spies she effectively operates as Cletus's second-in-command, even copiloting his aircraft. She gives birth to his son, Jorge Howell Frade, near the end of the fifth novel. Her OSS codename is "Cowgirl".

=== Enrico Mallín ===
Managing director of the Sociedad Mercantil de Importación de Productos Petrolíferos (SMIPP), an Argentine petroleum importation firm. His firm represents Howell Petroleum throughout South America and therefore becomes Cletus Frade's host when he first arrives in Argentina under the guise of a Howell Petroleum employee. Cletus's attitude and attention to his daughter, Dorotea, infuriate him. It is revealed in Honor Bound that he keeps a mistress, Maria-Teresa Alberghoni, who becomes involved with Lieutenant Tony Pelosi.

=== Coronel Alejandro Martín ===
Head of the Ethical Standards Office of the Bureau of Internal Security (BIS), Argentina's intelligence and counterintelligence service. A former cavalry officer, he finds his duties to be sometimes repugnant and his subordinates at times incompetent. He sides with el Coronel Frade and the military coup, and is promoted to Coronel and retained in service at the BIS following the takeover. He is more or less aware of Cletus Frade's true status and purpose in Argentina, but for the most part does not interfere with his operations, since he himself is pro-Allied and anti-German. However, Cletus is acutely aware that if and when Martín decides that the OSS presence in Argentina does not coincide with the best interests of Argentina, he will take swift action. Frade refers to him as "Cavalry" in OSS communications, but protects his identity. He refers to him as "Jedgar", in reference to J. Edgar Hoover when he is not quoting him as an intelligence source (as of The Honor Of Spies).

As often happens with Griffin's many series written over long periods of time, Martín's first name is subject to a continuity error: it was originally Alejandro Bernando Martín, but alternated between Alejandro and Bernardo over the course of the series.

=== Suboficial Mayor (Retired) Enrico Rodríguez ===
Lifelong friend and servant of el Coronel Jorge Guillermo Frade, and after his death, of Cletus Frade. He joined the Argentine Army to serve as el Coronel Frade's batman, and later retired with him, after serving as the commanding officer and suboficial mayor (sergeant major) of the Húsares de Puerryrredón, the elite cavalry formation of the Argentine Army. His complete devotion to el Coronel Frade resulted in him being shot and left for dead during el Coronel Frade's assassination. This, coupled with the death of his sister at the hands of the Germans, has left him deeply committed to killing as many Nazis as he can find, and protecting Cletus and Dorotea, even if it meant his death. He personally avenged his sister and el Coronel Frade when he shot two high-ranking Nazi officers in Blood and Honor, led the counterattack against a raiding party of SS troops in Death and Honor, and is depicted as a well-connected and resourceful old soldier with many friends throughout the Argentine military and the late Coronel Frade's many organizations. In later books he often takes command of ad hoc paramilitary units composed of military veterans who have found employment with the Frade businesses in order to assist Clete and his team in their missions.

While Enrico appears to be slow and sleepy to the uninformed observer, he is usually heavily armed (usually with his prized Remington Model 11 Shotgun and an Argentine Ballester–Molina .45 ACP pistol plus a snubnosed Colt Police Positive)., quite difficult to fool, and usually has a piece or two of sage advice to keep Cletus out of harm's way, and in fact is a highly skilled and experienced combat soldier. His presence near Cletus is a near given; many times he has pointed out that anyone who did not see him at Cletus's side might presume that some treachery was afoot.

=== First Lieutenant Anthony Pelosi ===
Previously an engineer platoon leader from the 82nd Airborne Division, Pelosi signed up for the OSS when it became clear to him that engineer work in the Army did not match up to his previous experience in civilian life as a salvage and demolitions contractor. He is selected to join Cletus Frade's team for his explosives knowledge, as one possible way to sink a suspected German submarine replenishment ship. The Navy and OSS instructors assigned to teach him military explosives are amazed at his skill in the subject matter. However, he instead ends up constructing incendiary devices so that an American submarine can locate and sink the ship at night. He is subsequently reassigned as an attaché to the embassy in Buenos Aires, while covertly continuing to serve on Cletus's OSS team. He becomes involved with an Italian-Argentine girl, who turns out to be Enrico Mallin's mistress; she ends up marrying him sometime between Secret Honor and Death and Honor.

=== Lieutenant Oscar J. Schultz ===
Originally a Chief Petty Officer, Chief Radioman aboard the USS Alfred Thomas. He is recruited ad hoc into the OSS when his radio skills are required to complete the sinking of the replenishment ship. He ends up left ashore in Argentina when his ship sails. To hide in plain sight, he affects the garb and mannerisms of a gaucho, hundreds of which work and live on Cletus Frade's estancia. However, he is frightened of horses, instead choosing to ride in one of the estate's ancient Model T trucks. In Death and Honor he is given a battlefield commission in the Naval Reserve and promoted to Lieutenant.

== Historical figures appearing in the series ==
- Coronel Juan Domingo Perón — Perón is introduced as el Coronel Frade's best friend; however, Cletus Frade dislikes him, both because he sympathizes with Nazi Germany, and for his proclivity for young girls. His portrayal in the Honor Bound series is undoubtedly influenced by Griffin's own political beliefs, and those of his Argentine father-in-law.
- Claus von Stauffenberg — architect of the failed plan to assassinate Adolf Hitler; in the series, he turns out to be close friends of the von Wachtstein family.
- Brigadier General William "Wild Bill" Donovan — head of the OSS, and Graham's boss. He is at turns delighted and frustrated by Cletus Frade's operations in Argentina, as well as how Graham directs those operations, and is under increasing pressure from the president to identify "Galahad", which Frade and Graham refuse to do.
- Allen Welsh Dulles - One of the two direct reports to Donovan in the OSS (the other is Graham). Dulles is equally as supportive to Frade as Graham is, and in later books becomes a mentor to him and assists him with European connections to his missions.
- General and President Arturo Rawson — Cletus Frade assists General Rawson during the military overthrow of the Argentine government. His resignation and the subsequent transition to President Pedro Pablo Ramírez within the timespan of the books is only referred to obliquely in Death and Honor — a sharp eye will catch references to "President Ramírez" instead of "President Rawson". However, in the following book, The Honor Of Spies, Rawson remains President. While in reality Rawson only served for a period of days before Ramírez replaced him, in these books he remains President for months.
- Evita Perón — Cletus Frade meets the future First Lady and later inadvertently introduces her to her future husband, el Coronel Juan Domingo Perón, during the events of Secret Honor. In The Honor Of Spies she appears as a now-steady romantic interest of Perón, and assists in the appropriation of ill-gotten gains from the SS.
- Howard Hughes — The movie mogul and famous aviation pioneer is revealed to be not only a close family friend of Cletus Frade, but also working with the OSS, in Death and Honor. His familiarity with Cletus Frade is retconned back to the first meeting between Cletus and Graham (as related in The Honor Of Spies), when the latter asks Cletus if he knows Hughes.
- Vizeadmiral Wilhelm Canaris — The head of the Abwehr, the German military Intelligence service. The series gradually begins to reveal Canaris' (historically accurate) opposition to the Nazi regime; by Death and Honor it is known to most of the key characters that he is one of what Cletus Frade calls the "Good Germans", and in The Honor Of Spies he is shown playing a prominent role in Operation Valkyrie.
