= The Presidential Agent (series) =

Book series by W. E. B. Griffin

- By Order of the President (2004); The Hostage (2005); The Hunters (2006); The Shooters (2007); Black Ops (2008); The Outlaws (2011); Covert Warriors (2011); Hazardous Duty (2013); Rogue Asset (2021); Direct Action (2025)
- Author: W. E. B. Griffin with William Edmund Butterworth IV, Andrews and Wilson, and Jack Stewart
- Publisher: G. P. Putnam's Sons
- No. of books: 10

The Presidential Agent series was written by American military author W. E. B. Griffin. The series consists of ten novels. Like his other novels, Griffin uses military time, along with the address of the place, and the chapter titles are never started on a separate page. The series is the author's latest.

== Background ==
The main character, Carlos Guillermo Castillo, first appears as an Army major and is later promoted to the rank of lieutenant colonel. Carlos is also known as Karl Wilhelm von und zu Gossinger. The reason for the double name stems from his parentage. His father, U.S. Army Warrant Officer Junior Grade Jorge Alejandro Castillo, had a one-night stand with Carlos' mother. His mother, Erika von und zu Gossinger, never saw Jorge again as he died shortly thereafter, flying "his fifty-second rescue mission, picking up downed chopper crews, when he was hit and his Huey blew up." Jorge Castillo was posthumously awarded the Medal of Honor. This allows Carlos to be admitted to West Point, which begins his Army career.

Erika raised Karl Wilhelm with the help of her father and brother, in das Haus im Wald (the House in the Woods) until they both died in an automobile accident on the Autobahn, leaving her to raise the boy alone. When Karl Wilhelm is the age of 12 his mother contracts fatal pancreatic cancer. She enlists the help of the then Major Naylor, who is stationed in Germany and was friends with her father, to find the boy's father. Naylor does some research into the father and finds out that not only is he dead but he was posthumously awarded the Medal of Honor. He flies to San Antonio and shows Karl's paternal grandmother, Doña Alicia Castillo a photograph of Karl. Upon seeing the photo she says that the boy has "Jorge's eyes" and immediately goes to Germany. Doña Alicia says that she and her husband, Don Juan Fernando Castillo, will take care of Karl when Erika herself dies of cancer. Karl is 12 and an orphan, but he goes from one rich, but loving, home to another and will gain a cousin, Fernando Lopez, who will become like a brother to him.

Castillo, known to his friends as Charley, admits to being confused about who he is at times. There is good reason for this. Not only do his family members leave him a proud legacy of elite Texican/Germanic heritage, they also give him a grounding in English, Spanish, German, Russian, Hungarian and a couple of others. He is an Army aviator, holds credentials for the Secret Service and an Executive Assistant to the Secretary of Homeland Security. Because of his interesting background, Castillo comes to the attention of the President, who decides to use him as a single-source information funnel for intelligence matters, "to serve as sort of a check on the investigations of the various agencies involved...What I'd like to know is what did they know and when did they know it?"

== Publishing history ==
The series has become one of Griffin's most popular. Griffin's son, William E. Butterworth IV, co-authored The Outlaws, Covert Warriors, and Hazardous Duty.

In August 2020, Andrews and Wilson announced their signing with Penguin/Random House to continue the Presidential Agent series for Griffin's family estate. Book 9, Rogue Asset, was published in 2021. Book 10, Direct Action, was written by Jack Stewart and published in 2025.

== Books in series ==
- Griffin, W. E. B. (2004). By Order of the President. Putnam. ISBN 0-399-15207-5.
  - This novel is possibly based on the 2003 Boeing 727-223 disappearance.
- Griffin, W. E. B. (2005). The Hostage. Putnam. ISBN 978-0-399-15314-3. OCLC 61151635.
- Griffin, W. E. B. (2006). The Hunters. Putnam. ISBN 978-0-399-15379-2.
- Griffin, W. E. B. (2007). The Shooters. Putnam. ISBN 978-0-399-15440-9.
- Griffin, W. E. B. (2008). Black Ops. Putnam. ISBN 978-0-399-15517-8.
  - This novel claims as a plot point that all subsequent Russian secret police agencies such as the SVR are descendants of the Oprichniki.
- Griffin, W. E. B.; Butterworth IV, William E. (2011). The Outlaws. Putnam. ISBN 978-0-399-15683-0.
- Griffin, W. E. B.; Butterworth IV, William E. (2011). Covert Warriors. Putnam. ISBN 978-0-399-15683-0.
- Griffin, W. E. B.; Butterworth IV, William E. (2013). Hazardous Duty. Putnam. ISBN 978-0-399-16067-7.
- Griffin, W. E. B.; Andrews, Brian; Wilson, Jeffrey (2021). Rogue Asset. Putnam. ISBN 978-0-698-16460-4.
- Stewart, Jack (2025). Direct Action. Putnam. ISBN 979-8-217-04638-6.
