= W. E. B. Griffin =

American novelist

- Born: William Edmund Butterworth III; November 10, 1929; Newark, New Jersey, U.S.
- Died: February 12, 2019 (aged 89); Daphne, Alabama, U.S.
- Occupation: Writer
- Spouse(s): Emma Josefa Macalik (m. 1950; died 2003) Maria del Pilar Menendez (died 2018)
- Children: 3
- Writing career
- Notable works: The Lieutenants; M*A*S*H Goes to New Orleans; Badge of Honor Series
- Website: Official website

William Edmund Butterworth III (November 10, 1929 – February 12, 2019), better known by his pen name W. E. B. Griffin, was an American writer of military and detective fiction with 59 novels in seven series published under that name. Twenty-one of those books were co-written with his son, William E Butterworth IV. He also published under 11 other pseudonyms and three versions of his real name (W. E. Butterworth, William E. Butterworth, and William E. Butterworth III).

== Early life ==
Griffin grew up in New York City and Philadelphia. He joined the United States Army in 1946. His military occupation was counterintelligence and in this capacity he served in the Constabulary in Germany, thus earning the Army of Occupation Medal. One of Griffin's duties was delivering food to German general officers and their families, including the widow of would-be Hitler assassin Claus von Stauffenberg. His exposure to German military and civilian aristocracy supplied much of the inspiration for such Griffin creations as Oberst Graf von Greiffenberg, who appears in several of the Brotherhood of War novels.

After completing his active duty military service, Griffin attended Philipps-Universität Marburg at Marburg-an-der-Lahn. His college days were cut short in 1951 when he was recalled to serve in the Korean War.

In Korea he first served as an official Army war correspondent with the 223rd Infantry Regiment, then as public information officer for U.S. X Corps, which included the 1st Marine Division. Griffin received the Combat Infantryman Badge for service at the front lines. His knowledge of combat and garrison life and his friendships with military personnel from different services would well serve his writing. Many of his books are dedicated to fallen comrades who died in Korea or later on in Vietnam or while serving with the international peacekeeping force dispatched during the Lebanese Civil War. Griffin was modest about his own service. He once told a Barnes & Noble interviewer:

My own military background is wholly undistinguished. I was a sergeant. What happened was that I was incredibly lucky in getting to be around some truly distinguished senior officers, sergeants, and spooks.

== Writing career ==
After the end of the Korean War, Griffin continued to work for the military in a civilian capacity as Chief of the Publications Division of the U.S. Army Signal Aviation Test & Support Activity at Fort Rucker, Alabama. After his first three novels proved successful, he left this job to pursue writing full-time. To date, he has 160 fiction and nonfiction works to his credit. He was well known and respected in the literary world for his thrillers and crime novels.

His son William E. Butterworth IV (previously editor of Boys' Life, the magazine of the Boy Scouts of America) co-authored some of his books. Butterworth fils was a long-time editor who moved from assisting in editing his father's work to collaborator. As of July 2015, he has been co-author of sixteen Griffin books in five different novel series. He was the keynote speaker at the 2014 Mystery Writers Key West Fest.

Griffin's knowledge of military jargon and administrative writing style shows when fictional orders and dispatches are incorporated in his novels. Many of his characters must battle red tape and bureaucratic mix-ups, sometimes making humorous end-runs around the system.

Griffin co-foundex of the William E. Colby Seminar on Intelligence, Military, and Diplomatic Affairs at Norwich University in Vermont with his friend, historian and Patton biographer Colonel Carlo D'Este. Griffin was a member of the Colby Circle, having participated in the William E. Colby Writers Symposium at Norwich University.

== Personal life ==
In 1950, Griffin married Emma Macalik, a ballet dancer and the author of As the Waltz Was Ending, a memoir of her life growing up as a dancer in Vienna during World War II. They had a daughter, Patricia, and two sons, John S. II and William E. IV. The marriage ended in divorce in the 1990s. Emma died from lung cancer in 2003.

Griffin later married Maria del Pilar Menendez, whom he had met in Argentina. She died in 2018.

Griffin died in February 2019 from colorectal cancer at the age of 89.

== Published works ==
The following is the list of books written by W.E.B. Griffin:

=== As W.E.B. Griffin ===
==== The Brotherhood of War Series ====
- The Lieutenants (1982), ISBN 0-515-09021-2
- The Captains (1982), ISBN 0-09-961420-0
- The Majors (1983), ISBN 0-09-961430-8
- The Colonels (1983), ISBN 0-515-07351-2
- The Berets (1985), ISBN 0-09-961440-5
- The Generals (1986), ISBN 0-515-08455-7
- The New Breed (1987), ISBN 0-399-13305-4
- The Aviators (1988), ISBN 0-7126-3689-7
- Special Ops (2001), ISBN 0-515-13248-9

==== The Corps Series ====
- Semper Fi (1986), ISBN 0-00-647227-3
- Call to Arms (1987), ISBN 0-515-09349-1
- Counterattack (1990), ISBN 0-399-13493-X
- Battleground (1991), ISBN 0-515-10640-2
- Line of Fire (1992), ISBN 0-399-13671-1
- Close Combat (1993), ISBN 0-399-13766-1
- Behind the Lines (1995), ISBN 0-399-14086-7
- In Danger's Path (1998), ISBN 0-515-12698-5
- Under Fire (2002), ISBN 0-515-13437-6
- Retreat, Hell! (2004), ISBN 0-515-13861-4

==== Men at War Series ====
- The Last Heroes (originally published as In The Line of Duty under the pseudonym of Alex Baldwin) (1984)
- The Secret Warriors (originally published as Covert Operations under the pseudonym of Alex Baldwin) (1985)
- The Soldier Spies (originally published as Give me Liberty under the pseudonym of Alex Baldwin) (1986)
- The Fighting Agents (originally published as Into Enemy Hands under the pseudonym of Alex Baldwin) (1989)
- The Saboteurs (2007) (with William E. Butterworth IV)
- The Double Agents (2008) (with William E. Butterworth IV)
- The Spymasters (2012) (with William E. Butterworth IV), ISBN 0-399-15751-4 OCLC 668193226

==== Badge of Honor Series ====
- Men in Blue (originally published under pseudonym John Kevin Dugan) (1988)
  - Special Operations (originally published under pseudonym John Kevin Dugan) (1989)
- The Victim (1991)
- The Witness (1992)
- The Assassin (1993)
- The Murderers (1994)
- The Investigators (1997)
- Final Justice (2003)
- The Traffickers (2009) (with William E. Butterworth IV)
- The Vigilantes (2010) (with William E. Butterworth IV)
- The Last Witness (2013) (with William E. Butterworth IV), ISBN 0-399-16257-7
- Deadly Assets (2015) (with William E. Butterworth IV), ISBN 9780399171178
- Broken Trust (2016) (with William E. Butterworth IV), ISBN 9780399171208
- The Attack (2019) (with William E. Butterworth IV, never released), ISBN 9780525541752

==== Honor Bound Series ====
- Honor Bound (1993)
- Blood and Honor (1996)
- Secret Honor (1999)
- Death and Honor (2008) {with William E. Butterworth IV}
- The Honor of Spies (2009) (with William E. Butterworth IV)
- Victory and Honor (2011) (with William E. Butterworth IV)
- Empire and Honor (2012) (with William E. Butterworth IV), ISBN 0-399-16066-3 OCLC 785077565

==== The Presidential Agent Series ====
- By Order of the President (2005), ISBN 0399152075 OCLC 55960903
- The Hostage (2006), ISBN 0399153144 OCLC 61151635
- The Hunters (2007), ISBN 0-399-15379-9 OCLC 191728479
- The Shooters (2008), ISBN 0-399-15440-X OCLC 154688721
- Black Ops (2009), ISBN 9780399155178 OCLC 213308426
- The Outlaws (2010), (with William E. Butterworth IV), ISBN 0-399-15683-6
- Covert Warriors (2011), (with William E. Butterworth IV) ISBN 0-399-15780-8 OCLC 751991340
- Hazardous Duty (2013), (with William E. Butterworth IV) ISBN 9780399160677 OCLC 837143850
- Rogue Asset (2021), (with Brian Andrews and Jeffrey Wilson ISBN 9780698164604 OCLC 1295450954
- Direct Action (2025), (with Jack Stewart) ISBN 9798217046386

==== Clandestine Operations Series ====
- Top Secret (2014) (with William E. Butterworth IV), ISBN 9781410471420
- The Assassination Option (2014) (with William E. Butterworth IV), ISBN 9780399171246
- Curtain of Death (2016) (with William E. Butterworth IV), ISBN 9780399176739
- Death at Nuremberg (2017) (with William E. Butterworth IV), ISBN 9780399176746
- The Enemy of My Enemy (2018) (with William E. Butterworth IV), ISBN 9780735213067

=== As William E. Butterworth, co-written with Richard Hooker ===
==== M*A*S*H Series ====
- M*A*S*H Goes to New Orleans (1974), ISBN 0671784900
- M*A*S*H Goes to Paris (1974), ISBN 0671784919 OCLC 1801773
- M*A*S*H Goes to London (1975), OCLC 1737522
- M*A*S*H Goes to Vienna (1976), OCLC 2350355
- M*A*S*H Goes to San Francisco (1976), ISBN 0722146450 OCLC 16430000
- M*A*S*H Goes to Morocco (1976), ISBN 0722146485 OCLC 16359954
- M*A*S*H Goes to Miami (1976), ISBN 0671807056 OCLC 2539401
- M*A*S*H Goes to Las Vegas (1976), ISBN 0671802658 OCLC 2033439
- M*A*S*H Goes to Hollywood (1976), ISBN 9780671804084 OCLC 2312954
- M*A*S*H Goes to Texas (1977), ISBN 0671808923 OCLC 3039993
- M*A*S*H Goes to Moscow (1977) ISBN 0722146655 OCLC 16477963
- M*A*S*H Goes to Montreal (1977), ISBN 0722146647 OCLC 15907621

=== As Webb Beech ===
- No French Leave (1960)
- Article 92: Murder-Rape (1965)
- Warrior's Way (1965)
- Make War in Madness (1966)

=== As Walker E. Blake ===
- Heartbreak Ridge (1962)
- Hell on Wheels (1962)
- The Girl in the Black Bikini (1962)
- The Loved and the Lost (1962)
- Once More With Passion (1964)
- Doing What Comes Naturally (1965)

=== As James M. McDouglas ===
- Hunger For Racing (1967)
- Racing to Glory (1969)
- The Twelve-cylinder Screamer (1971)
- Drag Race Driver (1971)
- A Long Ride on a Cycle (1972)

=== As Jack Dugan ===
- The Deep Kill (1984)

=== As Eden Hughes ===
- The Wiltons (1980)
- The Selkerks (1982)

=== As Allison Mitchell ===
- Wild Harvest (1983)
- Wild Heritage (1984)

=== As Edmund O. Scholefield ===
- L'il Wildcat (1965)
- Tiger Rookie (1966)
- Bryan's Dog (1967)
- Maverick on the Mound (1968)
- Yankee Boy (1970)

=== As Blakely St. James ===
- Christina's Passion (1977)

=== As Patrick J. Williams ===
- Return to Daytona (1962)
- Flat Out (1965)
- Fastest Funny Car (1967)
- Grad Prix Racing (1968)
- The Green Ghost (1968)
- Racing Mechanic (1971)
- Team Racer (1972)

=== As W. E. Butterworth, William E. Butterworth, or William E. Butterworth III ===
- Comfort Me With Love (1959)
- Hot Seat (1959)
- The Love-Go-Round (1960)
- Where We Go From Here (1961)
- The Court-Martial (1962)
- The Wonders of Astronomy (1964)
- The Wonders of Rockets and Missiles (1965)
- Fast Green Car (or Flat Out) (1965)
- Stock-car Racer (1966)
- Air Evac (1967)
- Soldiers on Horseback: The Story of the United States Cavalry (1966)
- The Image Makers (1967)
- Helicopter Pilot (1967)
- Road Racer (1967)
- Orders to Vietnam (1968)
- Redline 7100 (1968)
- Grand Prix Driver (1969)
- Stop and Search (1969)
- The Wheel of a Fast Car (1969)
- Up to the Quarterback (1969)
- Fast and Smart (1970)
- Marty and the Micromidgets (1970) (later as Micro-Midget Racer (1973))
- Susan and Her Classic Convertible (1970)
- Steve Bellamy (1970)
- Stars and Planets (1970)
- Moving West on 122 (1971)
- Crazy to Race (1971)
- My Father's Quite a Guy (1971)
- Flying Army; The Modern Air Arm of the U.S. Army (1971)
- Return to Racing (1971)
- Wheels and Pistons: The Story of the Automobile (1971)
- The High Wind: the Story of NASCAR Racing (1971)
- The Sex Traveler (1971)
- Dateline: Talladega (1972)
- The Narc (1972)
- Skyjacked (1972)
- The Race Driver (1972)
- Flying Army: The Modern Air Arm of the U.S. Army (1973)
- Hot Wire (1973)
- Race Car Team (1973)
- Yankee Driver (1973)
- Dave White and the Electric Wonder Car (1974)
- Stop, Thief! (1974)
- Tires and Other Things: Some Heroes of Automotive Evolution (1975)
- Careers in the Armed Services (1976)
- Mighty Minicycles (1976)
- The Roper Brothers and Their Magnificent Steam Automobile (1976)
- An Album of Automobile Racing (1977)
- Black Gold: The Story of Oil (1977)
- Hifi — From Edison's Phonograph to Quadraphonic Sound (1977)
- The Air Freight Mystery (1978)
- Next Stop, Earth (1978)
- The Tank Driver (1978)
- The Hotel Mystery (1979)
- The Wrecker Driver (1979)
- Under the Influence (1980)
- Slaughter by Auto (1980)
- Leroy and the Old Man (1980) ISBN 0-590-07638-8.
- Flunking Out (1981)
- A Member of the Family (1982)
- Moose, the Thing, and Me (1982)
- The Hunting Trip (2015), ISBN 9780399176234
