= Snow goose (disambiguation) =

The snow goose (Anser caerulescens) is a North American species of goose.

Snow Goose or The Snow Goose may also refer to:

- The Snow Goose: A Story of Dunkirk, a novella by Paul Gallico
- The Snow Goose (film), a 1971 film based on the novella by Paul Gallico
- The Snow Goose (album), an album by the band Camel
