= Top Secret (disambiguation) =

Top Secret generally refers to the highest acknowledged level of classified information.

Top Secret may also refer to:

== Film and television ==
- Top Secret (1952 film), a British comedy directed by Mario Zampi
- Top Secret (1967 film), an Italian-Spanish film
- Top Secret!, a 1984 American comedy starring Val Kilmer
- "Top Secret" (House), an episode of House
- Top Secret (TV series), a 1961 British series starring William Franklyn
- The Billionaire, known in Thailand as Top Secret: Wai Roon Pan Lan
- Top Secret Videos, a TruTV comedy show starring Brian Posehn, Ron Funches and Ali Kolbert

== Games ==
- Top Secret (arcade game) or Bionic Commando, a 1987 action platform game
- Top Secret (role-playing game), a 1980 espionage-themed role-playing game
- Top Secret, an experimental multiplayer online game project from Acclaim Games

== Music ==
- TST (band), a South Korean boy band formerly known as Top Secret
- Top Secret (UP10TION EP), a 2010 EP by South Korean boy band UP10TION
- Top Secret (single album), by Jun Hyoseong, 2014
- Top Secret, an album by Captain Jack
- Top Secret Drum Corps, a Swiss precision drum corps

=== Songs ===
- "Top Secret" (song), a 2012 song by F.T. Island
- "Top Secret", a single by Winston Wright
- "Top Secret", a song by Hangry & Angry from Sadistic Dance
- "Top Secret", a song by Namie Amuro from Play
- "Top Secret", a song by Ratt from Detonator
- "Top Secret", a song by Girls' Generation from The Boys
- "Top Secret", a song by Weeekly from We Can

== Publications ==
- Top Secret (play), a 1949 play by Alan Melville
- Himitsu – Top Secret, a 2001 Japanese manga
- Top Secret, a children's novel by John Reynolds Gardiner
- Top Secret (novel), a 2014 novel by W. E. B. Griffin and his son
- Top Secret (magazine), a Polish magazine devoted to the subject of computer and video games

== Other uses ==
- Top Secret (aircraft), a B-29 Superfortress modified to carry the atomic bomb in World War II
- Top Secret (company), a Japanese automobile tuner and parts manufacturer
