= The Widow of Bath =

The Widow of Bath may refer to:

- The Widow of Bath (novel), a 1952 novel by Margot Bennett
- The Widow of Bath (TV series), a 1959 British television series based on the novel
