= The Golden Pebble =

1948 novel

- Author: Margot Bennett
- Language: English
- Genre: Thriller
- Published: 1948
- Publisher: Nicholson & Watson
- Publication place: United Kingdom
- Pages: 237
- Preceded by: Away went the Little Fish
- Followed by: The Widow of Bath

The Golden Pebble is a thriller by the Scottish author Margot Bennett, published in 1948.

== Plot ==
Mark Rector is an entomologist who specializes in weevils. His sedate and dull life is unexpectedly disrupted when he travels to a remote village in Cornwall from where his uncle once mysteriously received a piece of gold.

== Reviews ==
The Times Literary Supplement included the book in their issue of 6 December 1947, writing Mrs Bennett's first non detective novel deals with a gold rush in Cornwall- and human nature in the raw.

== Notes ==
- The book originally cost eight shillings and sixpence.
- The book, like most of Bennett's other works, is no longer in print.
- This was the last instance that Bennett's work was published by Nicholson & Watson. Most of her other works were published by Eyre and Spottiswoode.
