= Castle in the Air (film) =

1952 British film by Henry Cass

- Film poster by Ronald Searle
- Directed by: Henry Cass
- Screenplay by: Edward Dryhurst; Alan Melville
- Based on: Castle in the Air; 1949 play by Alan Melville
- Produced by: Edward Dryhurst; Ernest Gartside
- Starring: David Tomlinson; Helen Cherry; Margaret Rutherford
- Cinematography: Erwin Hillier
- Edited by: Edward B. Jarvis
- Music by: Francis Chagrin
- Production company: Associated British Picture Corporation
- Distributed by: Associated British-Pathé
- Release dates: June 1952: 26 December 1952 (U.S.)
- Running time: 89 minutes
- Country: United Kingdom
- Language: English
- Box office: £116,727

Castle in the Air is a 1952 British comedy film directed by Henry Cass and starring David Tomlinson, Helen Cherry and Margaret Rutherford. The screenplay was by Edward Dryhurst and Alan Melville based on Melville's 1949 stage play of the same title. Produced by ABPC, the film was made at the company's Elstree Studios.

== Plot ==
The penniless 19th Earl of Locharne, the owner of a run-down Scottish castle which he has made into a mostly empty hotel, has to deal with a myriad of financial troubles, starting with his creditors and the few disgruntled tenants. Then there is Mr. Phillips, a socialist official from the British National Coal Board, which wants to requisition (not buy) it to convert into a vacation hostel for miners and their families. The earl introduces Phillips to a beautiful family ghost, Ermyntrude, the earl's grandfather's mistress.

Next, a long-time prospective purchaser, wealthy, attractive American divorcee Mrs. Clodfelter Dunne, shows up unannounced to look over the place in person. The earl's evident attraction to Mrs. Dunne is observed with dismay by his assistant, "Boss" Trent.

Both Mr. Phillips and Mrs. Dunne stay overnight at the castle. The earl is hard-pressed to simultaneously convince the former that the castle is falling into ruin and the latter that it is well worth purchasing.

Meanwhile, eccentric boarder Miss Nicholson is obsessed with proving that the earl is actually the rightful King of Scotland. When Mrs. Dunne expresses her belief that she is a member of the family, a delighted Miss Nicholson sets out to try to trace her lineage.

Mrs. Dunne eventually decides to purchase the place. She and the earl drive to Aberdeen to see his solicitor, Pettigrew. The price is $250,000 (about £70,000). Later, the earl receives a message to see an unnamed lady in hotel room 57. However, when he enters the room, he is disappointed to find Miss Nicholson and her followers, bent on a Jacobite restoration. The ensuing party runs late into the night, with Mrs. Dunne and Pettigrew in attendance. The earl and Mrs. Dunne, both rather intoxicated, return to the castle around four in the morning.

The next day, Trent, believing that the earl and Mrs. Dunne were alone in the hotel room, quarrels with the earl. She makes him inform Mrs. Dunne that the castle is in danger of being requisitioned. Mrs. Dunne takes back her cheque. However, after hearing from Phillips that he has been passed over for promotion, the earl has Mrs. Dunne offer him the position of managing the castle for her for a large salary, provided he turn in a recommendation that the castle not be acquired. He agrees. Now that the sale has been reinstated, the earl asks Trent to marry him, much to her delight. Miss Nicholson interrupts them with dreadful news: it turns out the earl is not in the direct line of succession after all.

== Cast ==
- David Tomlinson as The Earl of Locharne
- Helen Cherry as Boss Trent
- Margaret Rutherford as Miss Nicholson
- Barbara Kelly as Mrs. J. Clodfelter Dunne
- A. E. Matthews as Blair, a tenant
- Patricia Dainton as Ermyntrude
- Ewan Roberts as Menzies, the earl's loyal servant
- Brian Oulton as Phillips
- Clive Morton as MacFee
- Gordon Jackson as hiker
- Pat Sandys as girl hiker
- Russell Waters as Moffat
- John Harvey as Andrews
- Esme Beringer as Mrs. Thompson, a tenant
- Winifred Willard as Miss Miller, a tenant
- David Hannaford as small boy
- Helen Christie as Jessie
- Archie Duncan as constable
- Norman MacOwan as Pettigrew
- Stringer Davis as hall porter
- Paul Blake as hotel manager

== Critical reception ==
The Monthly Film Bulletin wrote: "The difficulties of the titled poor, an idea amusing when new, has been exploited too often in recent productions. David Tomlinson and Helen Cherry reinforce this impression by their lack of enthusiasm. Only Margaret Rutherford, clad in full Highland regalia and her own sublime brand of humour, lends life to a joke which otherwise falls flat, though it apparently sparkled a bit more on the stage."

Kine Weekly wrote: "Farcical comedy, smoothly adapted from the West End stage success. ... Certain of laughs in practically any company, it honours not hides behind the eagerly sought quota label. Capital British light booking."

Picturegoer wrote: "Chuckles all the way in a neat comedy about the parlous condition of some of the stately homes of Scotland. It is well produced and picturesquely staged."

At the time of its American release, The New York Times described the film as a "slender but thoroughly good-natured little British comedy".

TVGuide.com said: "this stage play should have stayed on the stage."

In British Sound Films: The Studio Years 1928–1959 David Quinlan rated the film as "good", writing: "A good few chuckles, mainly from Margaret Rutherford as the genealogist."

Leslie Halliwell said: "Topical comedy which sparkled more on the stage."

A reviewer on the website Fantastic Movie Musings and Ramblings wrote, "all in all, a delightful comedy."
