= Quick Curtain =

1934 novel

- First edition
- Author: Alan Melville
- Language: English
- Genre: Detective
- Publisher: Skeffington & Son
- Publication date: 1934
- Publication place: United Kingdom
- Media type: Print

Quick Curtain is a 1934 detective novel by the British writer Alan Melville. It was his second novel following his breakout success with the country house mystery Weekend at Thrackley earlier the same year. It was reissued in 2015 by the British Library Publishing as part of a group of crime novels from the Golden Age of Detective Fiction.

== Synopsis ==
When leading man Brandon Baker is shot dead mid-performance at the Grosvenor Theatre Inspector Wilson and his eager journalist son take up the investigation.

== Bibliography ==
- Hopkins, Lisa. Shakespearean Allusion in Crime Fiction: DCI Shakespeare. Springer, 2016.
- Hubin, Allen J. Crime Fiction, 1749-1980: A Comprehensive Bibliography. Garland Publishing, 1984.
- Wolfe, Graham. Theatre-Fiction in Britain from Henry James to Doris Lessing: Writing in the Wings. Routledge, 2019.
