= Patrick Garland =

British director, writer, and actor (1935–2013)

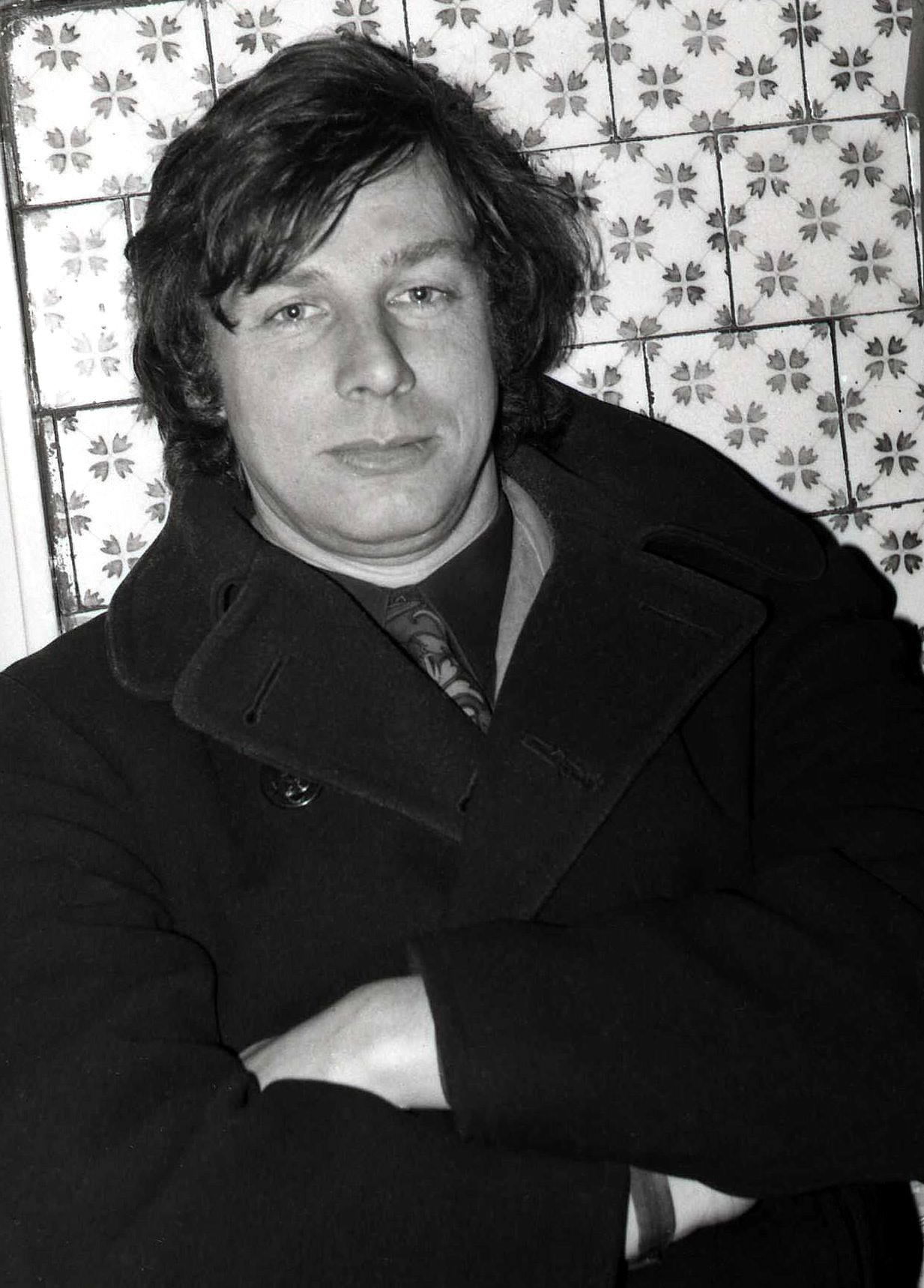
- Garland in 1969, by Allan Warren
- Born: Patrick Ewart Garland; 10 April 1935; England
- Died: 19 April 2013 (aged 78); Worthing, West Sussex, England
- Resting place: Saint Mary's churchyard, Sullington, West Sussex, England
- Occupations: Actor, director and writer
- Years active: 1963–2013
- Spouse: Alexandra Bastedo (m. 1980)
- Parent(s): Ewart James Garland; Rosalind Beatrice Fell

Patrick Ewart Garland (10 April 1935 – 19 April 2013) was a British director, writer and actor.

== Career ==
Garland was educated at St Mary's College, Southampton, and St Edmund Hall, Oxford where he studied English and was Literary Editor of Isis, President of the Oxford University Poetry Society and President of the Oxford University Dramatic Society. and in 1958 played Henry V directed by Peter Dews in Magdalen College deer park. Garland's poetry had appeared in John Lehmann's The London Magazine and the annual PEN anthology during his teens. He was photographed in Oxford at 23 by Lord Snowdon and later. His maternal grandfather was Herbert Granville Fell, an artist and editor of The Connoisseur magazine.

His appearances as an actor included An Age of Kings, where he played Prince John in Henry IV, Part 2 and Clarence in Richard III, among others.

Garland started a poetry festival called Poetry International in 1963 with Ted Hughes and Charles Osborne. He was a director and producer for the BBC's Music and Arts Department (1962–1974), and worked on its Monitor series. In 1964, he directed the Monitor film "Down Cemetery Road" about Philip Larkin, in which John Betjeman also appeared. His work with the BBC arts department included interviews with Noël Coward (1969), Stevie Smith, and Marcel Marceau. His television film of The Snow Goose (1971) won a Golden Globe for "Best Movie made for TV", and was nominated for both a BAFTA and an Emmy.

Meanwhile, his career in the theatre had begun to develop. In 1967 he created a one-man show based on John Aubrey's Brief Lives in collaboration with designer Julia Trevelyan Oman and Roy Dotrice (and Michael Williams in a later revival) and the following year directed the original production of Alan Bennett's Forty Years On with John Gielgud as the headmaster of a decaying public school called Albion House. In the mid-1970s, the musical Billy, based on Billy Liar, with Michael Crawford in the lead was performed at Drury Lane, He served as the Artistic Director for the Chichester Festival Theatre twice, 1981–1985 and 1990–1994, where he directed over 20 productions. He also raised money to build and open the theatre's second auditorium, the Minerva Theatre, Chichester. He was the only director to have had four plays running in the West End of London at the same time.

In 1978 Garland directed Under the Greenwood Tree at Salisbury Playhouse. This production transferred to the Vaudeville Theatre in the Strand London West End in the spring of 1979. In 1980, Garland was responsible for the York Mystery Plays. He directed the revival of My Fair Lady on Broadway in the early 1980s with Rex Harrison (about whom he wrote The Incomparable Rex) and Don Giovanni and in Japan, Handel's opera Ottone. He also directed Eileen Atkins in his own adaptation of Virginia Woolf's book A Room of One's Own.

In 2000, he directed Simon Callow in The Mystery of Charles Dickens by Peter Ackroyd, followed by a tour that culminated in Australia and Broadway (the 2012 revival did not directly involve Garland), and Joan Collins in Full Circle by Alan Melville. He also worked with Alan Bennett again, directing Patricia Routledge in the second Talking Heads and Bennett himself in Telling Tales.

He directed the film of Ibsen's A Doll's House (1973) with Claire Bloom, Anthony Hopkins and Ralph Richardson, and his 1971 television film of The Snow Goose won Golden Globe: "Best Movie made for TV" and was nominated for both a BAFTA award and an Emmy. He directed Fanfare for Elizabeth at Covent Garden on Queen Elizabeth II's 60th Birthday, and in 1986 at Westminster Abbey Celebration of a Broadcaster. of the late Richard Dimbleby. 1989 he directed the Thanksgiving Service in Westminster Abbey for Lord Olivier. In 1998 Garland devised 'A Christmas Glory' for the 300th anniversary of St Paul's Cathedral. He also devised and presented several performances for the Charleston Festival.

== Personal life ==
Garland was married to the actress Alexandra Bastedo from 1980; the wedding took place at Chichester Cathedral. He was awarded Honorary D Litt at the University of Southampton 1994 and an Honorary Fellow of St Edmund Hall, Oxford in 1997.

== Memoirs and book on Corsica ==
Garland had been working on his memoirs, as well as a book about Corsica, that both remained unfinished at the time of his death. It was announced that his memoirs would be completed by Simon Callow.

== Archive ==
After Garland's death the British Library acquired his archive including diaries and journals, personal and professional correspondence (including extensive correspondence with Alan Bennett and Ted Hughes), production files, prompt books and directors’ annotated scripts and material relating to Poetry International which Garland founded with Ted Hughes and the inaugural festival at London’s Southbank Centre in 1967.

== Works ==
Books

- Brief Lives (1967)
- A Man Whose Disapproval One Would Least Like to Have. A personal memoir of Lord David Cecil, the Goldsmith Professor of English Literature, printed privately 31pp. c.1988
- The Wings of The Morning (1989)
- Oswald The Owl (1990)
- Angels in The Sussex Air (1995), an anthology of Sussex poets
- The Incomparable Rex (1998), a memoir of Rex Harrison. Republished with an introduction by Simon Callow (2019)
- Abstract & Brief Chronicles (2007), a series of essays read by Garland

=== Poetry ===
published in:

- The London Magazine (1954)
- New Poems (1954)
- Oxford Poetry, edited by Peter Ferguson and Dennis Keene, Fantasy Press (1957)
- Encounter (February 1986)
- Encounter (September/October 1987)
- Sussex Seams (1996)
- Poetry West

=== Short stories ===
published in:

- Gemini
- Light Blue, Dark Blue, published by MacDonald, (1960)
- Englanderzählt, edited by Hilde Speil, published by Fischer, Frankfurt (1960)
- Transatlantic Review "A Lull", (1970), (1971), (1976)

=== Introductions and articles ===
- John Clare by Patrick Garland, The London Magazine, Volume 1 No.7. August 1954
- 15 Poems for William Shakespeare, with an introduction by Patrick Garland, John Lehmann, & William Plomer; Eric Walter White, (editor), published by Stratford-upon-Avon: The Trustees & Guardians of Shakespeare's Birthplace (1964)
- 'Poets on Poetry' interviews with W.H. Auden, Seamus Heaney, Douglas Dunn, Patricia Beer and Marvin Cohen, The Listener, 8 November 1973
- Ninette de Valois reminisces to Patrick Garland, The Listener, 20 June 1974
- Alan Bennett talks to Patrick Garland, Vogue, July 1986
- 'An Arundel Tomb' on Philip Larkin's poem, includes: "An Enormous Yes: a Memoir of the Poet" by Patrick Garland, 1987
- These Things also are Spring's, poems by Edward Thomas, selected and with an introduction by Patrick Garland, Folio Society, 1988
- David Cecil: A Portrait by His Friends, edited by Hannah Cranborne, The Dovecote Press, 1990
- Sussex Seams: A Collection of Travel Writing by Paul Foster, foreword by Garland, Sutton Publishing Ltd, 1996
- Chichester and the Arts 1944-2004 – A Celebration edited by Paul Foster, introduction by Garland, University College Chichester, 2004 ISBN 094876581X
- 'Laborious Lobster Nights, Farewell', Charleston Magazine, Issue 22, Autumn/Winter 2000, published by the Charleston Trust
- 'The Habit of Art' by Alan Bennett, theatre programme article: "The Poet Auden" by Garland, Royal National Theatre, 2009
- articles for The Oldie.

=== Chichester Festival Theatre productions ===
- 1975
  - An Enemy of the People – with Donald Sinden, directed by Garland
  - Monsieur Perrichon's Travels – with Rex Harrison, directed by Garland
- 1977
  - The Apple Cart – directed by Garland
- 1978
  - A Woman of No Importance – directed by Garland
  - Look After Lulu! – directed by Garland and Theatre Royal Haymarket
- 1981
  - The Cherry Orchard – directed by Garland
  - The Mitford Girls – directed by Garland
  - Underneath the Arches – by Garland, Brian Glanville and Roy Hudd in association with Chesney Allen – directed by Roger Redfarn
- 1982
  - On the Rocks – directed by Jack Emery and Garland
  - Cavell – directed by Garland
  - Goodbye, Mr Chips – directed by Garland and Chris Selbie
- 1983
  - As You Like It – directed by Garland
- 1984
  - Forty Years On – directed by Garland
  - The Merchant of Venice – directed by Garland
  - The Philanthropist – directed by Garland
- 1989
  - Victory – directed by Garland and Matthew Francis
  - Tovarich – directed by Garland
- 1992
  - King Lear in New York, by Melvyn Bragg – directed by Garland
- 1993
  - Pickwick – directed by Garland
- 1994
  - Pygmalion – directed by Garland
- 1998
  - Chimes at Midnight – directed by Garland

Minerva Theatre productions at Chichester Festival Theatre

- 1992
  - Vita & Virginia – directed by Garland
- 1993
  - Elvira '40 – directed by Garland
- 1996
  - Beatrix adapted from the writings of Beatrix Potter by Garland and Judy Taylor – directed by Garland with Patricia Routledge. It opened at the Minerva, then toured to Malvern, Plymouth, Guildford, Richmond, Bath and Windsor; Beatrix was broadcast by BBC Radio 4 on 21 February 1998

=== Selected other productions ===
- The Tremendous Ghost (1964), devised by Garland and Richard Johnson, directed by Garland, Stratford-upon-Avon
- The Rebel (1964), directed by Garland, Aldwych Theatre, Royal Shakespeare Company, with Peter Bowles, William Marlowe, Bryan Pringle, Clive Swift, David Warner.
- The Stiffkey Scandals of 1932, directed by Garland, Traverse Theatre (1967) then Queen’s Theatre (1969), with Charles Lewsen, Annie Ross, Peter Bowles, John Gower
- Cyrano by Edmond Rostand, adapted and directed by Garland, National Theatre Company, Cambridge Theatre (1970)
- Under the Greenwood Tree by Thomas Hardy, adapted by Garland (1970)
- Getting On by Alan Bennett, Brighton and London (1971)
- Hedda Gabler, Broadway (1971)
- A Doll's House, Broadway (1971)
- John Clare, with Edward Woodward, devised and presented by Garland. Live recording at National Portrait Gallery, London released by Argo Records (UK) (1972)
- Hair, Israel (1972)
- Mad Dog, by Nicholas Salaman with Denholm Elliott and Marianne Faithfull, Hampstead Theatre Club (1973)
- Billy, Theatre Royal, Drury Lane, London (1974)
- Murder in the Cathedral by T.S. Eliot, Chichester Cathedral (1977)
- Signed and Sealed, written by Georges Feydeau and Maurice Desvallieres – directed by Garland (1978)
- Waters of the Moon, written by N. C. Hunter with Ingrid Bergman, Wendy Hiller, Doris Hare . directed by Patick Garland, Theatre Royal Haymarket (1978)
- Shut Your Eyes and Think of England with Donald Sinden (1978)
- Kipling by Brian Clark with Alec McCowen (1985), theatre and Channel 4 television.
- Beecham by Caryl Brahms and Ned Sherrin (1980), with Timothy West
- Eagle in New Mexico by D. H. Lawrence (1980), with Ian McKellen, Paolo Soleri Theatre, Santa Fe, New Mexico USA
- My Fair Lady (1981), Broadway revival with Rex Harrison, directed by Garland; the production won a Tony Award 1980
- Canaries Sometimes Sing by Frederick Lonsdale, Albery Theatre (1986–87)
- The Secret of Sherlock Holmes by Jeremy Paul, with Edward Hardwicke and Jeremy Brett, Wyndham's Theatre (1988–1989)
- Lights Out, created by Garland; performed by Garland, Barbara Leigh-Hunt and Richard Pasco, on the evening of Edward Thomas's birthday in Selborne Church.
- A Song in the Night, the story of John Clare, written by Roger Frith, directed by Garland, starring Freddie Jones in a solo portrayal of the poet John Clare, 1986 Edinburgh Fringe, (1989) Lyric Hammersmith and touring.
- A Room of One's Own by Virginia Woolf adapted by Garland, with Eileen Atkins (1989)
- The Dressmaker by Georges Feydeau, with Ronnie Corbett, Theatre Royal, Bath (1990)
- The Tempest with Denis Quilley as Prospero, Regent's Park Open Air Theatre (1996)
- The Importance of Being Oscar by Micheal MacLiammoir (1997) with Simon Callow, directed by Patrick Garland, Savoy Theatre
- Your Faithfull Possum, Alan Bennett reading the letters of T.S. Eliot to Virginia Woolf, produced and directed by Garland, Charleston Farmhouse
- An Enormous Yes, with Alan Bates, from the writing of Philip Larkin, adapted and directed by Garland
- Wooing in Absence, performed by Benjamin Whitrow and Natalia Makarova, adapted by Garland from the letters of Lydia Lopokova and John Maynard Keynes, (2000), Charleston Farmhouse, later at Tate Britain
- The Mystery of Charles Dickens by Peter Ackroyd, performed by Simon Callow, premiere at Wiltons Music Hall (2000)
- The Woman in Black, Old Globe, San Diego and Minetta Lane Theatre, New York (2001)
- Christopher Columbus, music by William Walton, words by Louis MacNeice, Brighton Dome, (2002)
- Full Circle, tour with Joan Collins, (2004)
- An Enormous Yes, with Oliver Ford Davies, Orange Tree Theatre, Richmond, (2006)
- Henry Irving and the Victorian Theatre, written by Nicola Lyon, directed by Garland with Roger Braban, Richard Briers, Rowland Davies, Donald Sinden, Penelope Wilton, National Portrait Gallery
- Visiting Mr. Green by Jeff Baron with Warren Mitchell, directed by Garland (2007–8)
- Brief Lives, written and directed by Garland with Roy Dotrice as John Aubrey (2008)
- Dr. Marigold and Mr. Chops by Charles Dickens, performed by Simon Callow at the Edinburgh Festival, 2008 and at Riverside Studios, 2009 – January 2010; adapted and directed by Garland
- Recital with Patricia Routledge of a spiritual anthology (for charity), Sullington, Sussex (2010)
- Dr. Marigold and Mr. Chops by Charles Dickens performed by Simon Callow, tour (2011)
- A Room of One's Own, Patrick Garland's adaptation, read by Eileen Atkins, National Portrait Gallery (2014)

=== Charleston Festival Galas ===
- 'The Incompomparable Rex', performed by Patrick Garland from his biography of Rex Harrison, 19 August 1999
- 'A Moment's Liberty', from the diaries of Virginia Woolf with Eileen Atkins and Patrick Garland
- ‘Letters to Julian’, Vanessa Bell’s correspondence with her eldest son, performed by Patricia Hodge and Sam West
- ‘Your Faithful Possum’, T S Eliot’s correspondence with Virginia Woolf, performed by Alan Bennett, Penelope Keith
- ‘Dearest Lytton, your V.W.’, correspondence between Lytton Strachey and Virginia Woolf, performed by Eileen Atkins and Simon Callow, devised by Patrick Garland
- ‘Wooing in Absence’, extracts from the letters of Lydia Lopokova and Maynard Keynes, performed by Natalia Makarova and Benjamin Whitrow, devised and directed by Patrick Garland, later at Tate Britain
- 'Wystan and Louis' devised by Patrick Garland about Wystan Auden and Louis MacNeice, performed by Patrick Garland, Corin Redgrave and James Wilby, 22 May 2004
- 'An Enormous Yes’, The poetry and landscape of Philip Larkin, devised by Patrick Garland, performed by Alan Bennett and Patrick Garland
- ‘Dr. Marigold and Mr Chops’, two stories by Charles Dickens, adapted by Patrick Garland, performed by Simon Callow

=== Selected television and film ===
- 1952 - ‘’The Deluge’’ (Wednesday 30 July 1952), produced by Rodney J. Spratley, The Southampton Student Players, BBC Television
- 1968 - No Man's Land, written and narrated by Patrick Garland, produced by Tristram Powell. Henry Williamson recalls the first world war, with the war poems of Siegfried Sassoon, BBC television
- 1969 – An Age of Kings, several parts as actor, BBC Television
- 1964 – "Down Cemetery Road", film with Philip Larkin and John Betjeman, Monitor (TV)
- 1965 – Famous Gossips, Alan Badel, Patrick Garland, Alan Bennett
- 1965 – Beginning to End by Samuel Beckett with Jack MacGowran, BBC
- 1969 – The Zoo in Winter, with Jonathan Miller, BBC (TV)
- 1971 – The Stronger (TV) by August Strindberg with Britt Ekland and Marianne Faithfull
- 1971 – The Snow Goose (TV)
- 1973 – A Doll's House (cinema film)
- 1974 – The Cay (TV), with James Earl Jones
- 1974-82- Call My Bluff as himself, 4 episodes
- 1976 – Vicar of this Parish (TV, BBC Wales): John Betjeman on the life of Francis Kilvert
- 1980 – "Every Night Something Awful"
- 1980 – "Chaos Supersedes E.N.S.A."
- 1984 – "Kipling" with Alec McCowen, Channel 4
- 1984 - "All the World's a Stage", written by Ronald Harwood, directed by Keith Cheetham and Patrick Garland
- 1987 – "Laurence Olivier's 80th Birthday Celebrations: What Will Survive of Us is Love" – poetry read by Olivier, directed by Garland
- 1989 – 'Celebrity interview': Bob Holness in conversation with Patrick Garland, LBC
- 1990 – A Room of One's Own (TV)
- 1998 – "Talking Heads 2"; episode "Miss Fozzard Finds Her Feet" with Patricia Routledge.
- 2000 – "Telling Tales" by Alan Bennett: episodes directed by Garland – 'Our war'; 'An ideal home'; 'A shy butcher'; 'Days out'; 'Eating out'; 'Unsaid prayers'; 'No mean city'
- 2000 – The Mystery of Charles Dickens (TV)

=== Television (as writer) ===
- 1960 – "The Hard Case" with John Hurt
- 1961 – "The Younger Generation"
- 1961 – "Flow Gently Sweet Afton" with John Thaw
- 1968 - "The Highland Jaunt", journey to the Western Islands and Highlands of Scotland in 1773 by Dr. Johnson and Mr. James Boswell , adapted and directed by Patrick Garland, BBC Two
- 1972 – I Spy a Stranger by Jean Rhys, dramatised by Garland
- 1980 – "Every Night Something Awful""
- 1980 – "Chaos Supersedes E.N.S.A."

=== Radio ===
- Broadcasts of poetry read by Garland included Ted Hughes's "The Storm", sub-titled 'from Homer, Odyssey, Book V', commissioned by Anthony Thwaite, broadcast on BBC Radio 3, 1960
- "The War Between Men and Women", compiled by Garland, readers Judi Dench and Michael Williams, 1973
- Quote, Unquote, Garland appeared (as himself) in two episodes in 1979 and in two episodes in 1992, BBC Radio 4
