= Coventry Theatre =

Theatre in Coventry, England

Coordinates: 52.410753°N 1.508690°W

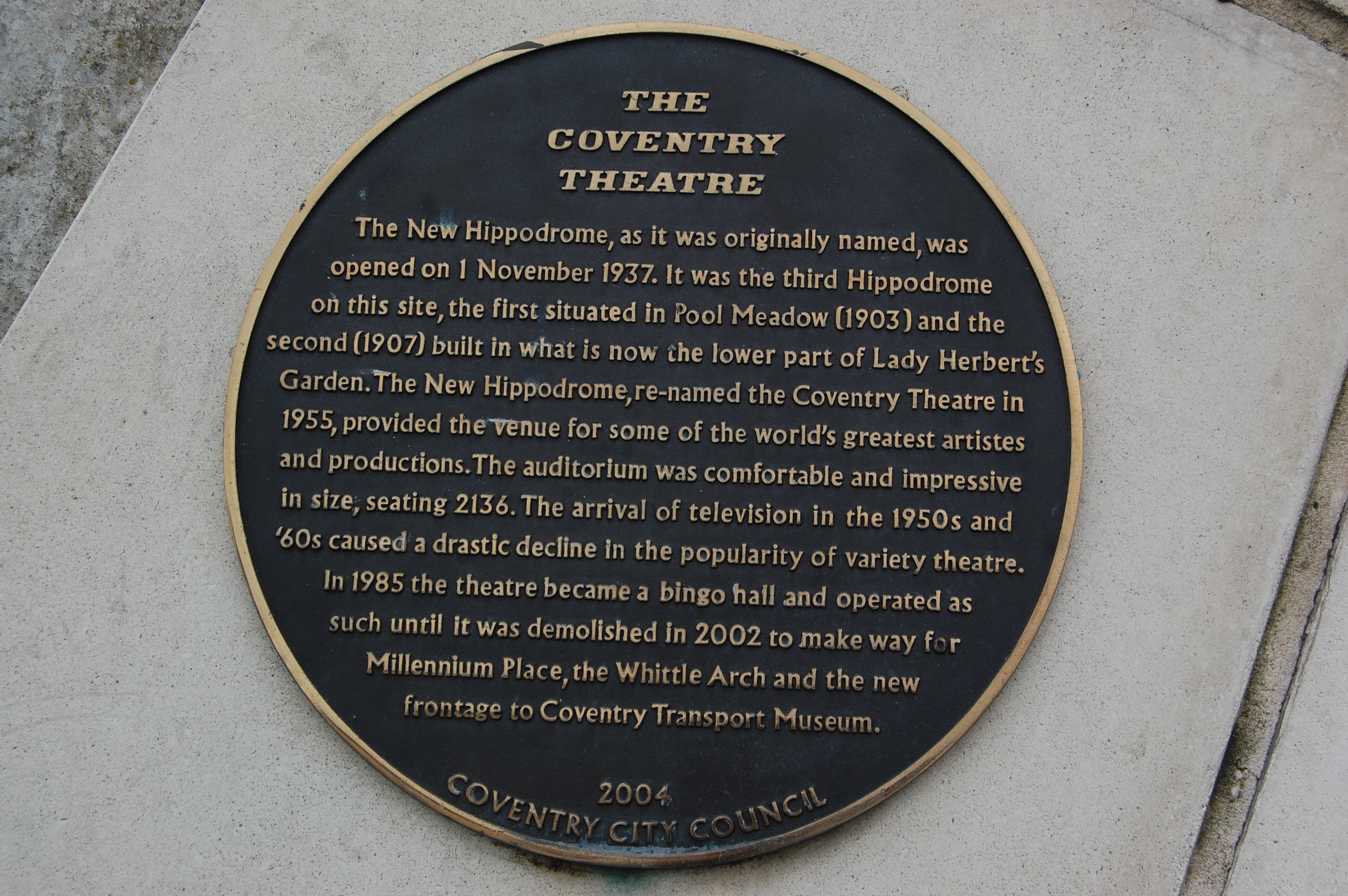
Commemorative plaque in Coventry

The Coventry Theatre was a 2,000-seat theatre located on Hales Street in Coventry, England. It opened in 1937 as the New Hippodrome and was renamed the Coventry Theatre in 1955. In 1979 it was purchased by businessman Paul Gregg and became the Coventry Apollo. It closed in 1985 with a performance by Barbara Dickson. In its later years the building became a bingo club before being demolished in 2002.

Alan Melville's comedy Castle in the Air premiered at the theatre in 1949 before transferring to the West End.
