= Death of Anton =

1936 novel

- First edition
- Author: Alan Melville
- Language: English
- Genre: Detective
- Publisher: Skeffington & Son
- Publication date: 1936
- Publication place: United Kingdom
- Media type: Print
- Pages: 288

Death of Anton is a 1936 detective novel by the British writer Alan Melville. It was one of several novels he wrote in the mid-1930s in the wake of his bestselling debut Weekend at Thrackley. It was reissued in 2015 by the British Library Publishing as part of a group of crime novels from the Golden Age of Detective Fiction. Its circus background of the novel was a comparatively unusual setting in detective novels of the period.

== Synopsis ==
Anton is the trainer of seven Bengal tigers who are the top attraction at Carey's Circus. When Anton is found dead in their cage, the initial suspicion is that he has lost control of the animals and been killed. It soon transpires that he was in fact shot elsewhere, with the murderer disposing of him in the cage in the hope that they would maul him and destroy the evidence of the crime. The investigating officer Detective Inspector Minto of Scotland Yard becomes convinced that the tigers know who killed their beloved trainer and will try to avenge him by attacking the true culprit.

== Bibliography ==
- Ebury, Katherine. Modern Literature and the Death Penalty, 1890-1950. Springer Nature, 2020.
- Hubin, Allen J. Crime Fiction, 1749-1980: A Comprehensive Bibliography. Garland Publishing, 1984.
