= Gay's the Word =

Gay's the Word may refer to:

- Gay's the Word (musical), a musical by Ivor Novello with lyrics by Alan Melville
- Gay's the Word (bookshop), a gay bookshop in London
