= Meier Tzelniker =

Romanian-British actor (1894–1980)

- Born: 1 January 1894; Hotin, Bessarabia Governorate, Russian Empire (now Khotyn, Ukraine)
- Died: 8 October 1980 (aged 86); London, England
- Occupation: Actor

Meier Tzelniker (1 January 1894 – 8 October 1980) was a Romanian-British actor. He appeared mainly in Yiddish theatre, but was sometimes a character actor in English-language plays and films.

== Biography ==
Tzelniker was born and raised in the city of Hotin, located in the Bessarabia Governorate of the Russian Empire (present-day Chernivtsi Oblast, Ukraine), the son of a Romanian Jewish yeast manufacturer. He was a boy chorister in a synagogue when he got his first stage role in Yiddish theatre, and toured eastern Europe with a Yiddish theatre company. He studied at the Odesa Oblast Academic Drama Theater, and spent three years acting in Russia. He emigrated to London in 1927, co-founding the Yiddish National Theater Company.

Tzelniker was a leading figure in London's Yiddish theatre scene, and also appeared as a character actor in English-language productions. He had notable film roles in It Always Rains On Sunday (1947), A Night to Remember (1958), Expresso Bongo (1959), and The Killing of Sister George (1968). His West End credits included Clifford Odets' Awake and Sing! and The Big Knife.

== Personal life ==
Tzelniker was married to actress Brana Freit, they had two children including Anna Tzelniker, also an actress.

=== Death ===
A long-time resident of Stepney in the East End of London, Tzelniker died there on 8 October 1980, aged 86.

== Partial filmography ==
- Mr. Emmanuel (1944) - Mr. Silver
- It Always Rains on Sunday (1947) - Solly, his father
- Last Holiday (1950) - Baltin
- Venetian Bird (1952) - Mayor of Mirave
- The Teckman Mystery (1954) - John Rice
- Make Me an Offer (1954) - Wendl
- The Woman for Joe (1955) - Sol Goldstein
- The Extra Day (1956) - Lou Skeat
- Stars in Your Eyes (1956) - Maxie Jago
- The Long Haul (1957) - Nat Fine
- A Night to Remember (1958) - Mr. Isador Straus
- Expresso Bongo (1959) - Mayer
- Jungle Street (1960) - Mr. Rose
- Let's Get Married (1960) - Schutzberger
- A Circle of Deception (1960) - Barman
- His and Hers (1961) - Felix McGregor
- The 25th Hour (1967) - Abramovici
- The Sorcerers (1967) - Jewish Baker
- The Killing of Sister George (1968) - Mr. Katz
