= The Man Who Didn't Fly =

1955 novel

- First edition (UK)
- Author: Margot Bennett
- Cover artist: Val Biro
- Language: English
- Genre: Thriller
- Published: 1955
- Publisher: Eyre & Spottiswoode
- Publication place: United Kingdom
- Media type: Print
- Pages: 190
- ISBN: 074 5186246

The Man Who Didn't Fly is a detective novel by the Scottish author Margot Bennett. It was published originally in 1955. It was shortlisted for the Gold Dagger award for crime-writing that year.

== Premise ==
A private plane crashes, killing the pilot and all of its passengers. Yet, whilst investigating, the police discover that four passengers should have been on the plane but only three boarded. Which of the four men who had booked on the flight didn't fly, and what has happened to him?

== TV Adaptation ==
Writer Jerome Coopersmith adapted the novel as an hour-long Kraft Theatre episode in 1958. The episode (whose principal cast included Jonathan Harris, a young William Shatner, and future director Paul Mazursky) aired at 9pm on Wednesday 16 July.

== Availability ==
The novel was reissued in 2020 (ISBN 0712353410).
