= The Teckman Mystery =

1954 film

- British theatrical poster
- Directed by: Wendy Toye
- Written by: Francis Durbridge; James Matthews
- Produced by: Josef Somlo
- Starring: Margaret Leighton; John Justin; Roland Culver
- Cinematography: Jack Hildyard
- Edited by: Bert Rule
- Music by: Clifton Parker
- Color process: Black and white
- Production company: Corona Productions
- Distributed by: British Lion Films
- Release date: 27 October 1954
- Running time: 90 minutes
- Country: United Kingdom
- Language: English

The Teckman Mystery is a 1954 British mystery film directed by Wendy Toye and starring Margaret Leighton, John Justin, Roland Culver and Michael Medwin. It was written by Francis Durbridge and James Matthews, based on the 1953 BBC TV serial The Teckman Biography by Durbridge. It was distributed by British Lion.

== Plot ==
A biographer researching a book on a pilot who died during the test flight of a new plane falls in love with the pilot's sister. As he uncovers more about the test flight, people connected with the case begin to die. The author naturally becomes nervous, until two Scotland Yard inspectors take on the case.

== Cast ==
- Margaret Leighton as Helen Teckman
- John Justin as Philip Chance
- Roland Culver as Major Harris
- Michael Medwin as Martin Teckman
- George Coulouris as Andrew Garvin
- Duncan Lamont as Inspector Hilton
- Raymond Huntley as Maurice Miller
- Jane Wenham as Ruth Wade
- Meier Tzelniker as John Rice
- Harry Locke as Leonard
- Frances Rowe as Eileen Miller
- Barbara Murray as girl on plane
- Irene Lister as waitress
- Gwen Nelson as daily woman
- Mary Grant as B.E.A. Clerk
- Andreas Malandrinos as waiter
- Dan Cressey as Drake
- Peter Taylor as Leroy
- Warwick Ashton as Sgt. Blair
- Ben Williams as 1st beefeater
- Frank Webster as 2nd beefeater
- Peter Augustine as man with pipe
- Maurice Lane as GPO messenger
- Mollie Palmer as air hostess
- Bruce Beeby as Wallace
- Gordon Morrison as Boris

== Production ==
It was shot at Shepperton Studios with sets designed by the art director William Kellner. Location shooting took place around London including in Kensington, Belgravia, Northolt Aerodrome and Tower Bridge.

== Critical reception ==
The Monthly Film Bulletin wrote: " Within its own limits, the story is quite competently handled, although the Iron Curtain trimmings begin to have a rather tired and jaded look. The Tower of London sequence is rather reminiscent of a Hitchcock film of the 1930's, but the present director's ability to sustain a mood does not equal that of her predecessor. The cast contains a wide variety of familiar English and un-English types, though some may feel that Margaret Leighton's wicked Helen is a little too much of a good thing."

The New York Times wrote, "an obvious fly-by-night, with a pretty good cast headed by the gifted Margaret Leighton and John Justin, this Associated Artists release is a slow, contrived and exasperatingly arch puzzler that sets some sort of record for meandering banality".

The Radio Times called the film a "passable thriller" with "more than a hint of The Third Man."

In British Sound Films: The Studio Years 1928–1959 David Quinlan rated the film as "good", writing: "Typical Durbridge mystery with fine profusion of 'cliffhanger' endings."

Leslie Halliwell said: "Peripatetic spy story with the twists expected of this author; all quite enjoyable."
