= Hot Ice (1952 film) =

1952 British film by Kenneth Hume

- Directed by: Kenneth Hume
- Written by: Kenneth Hume
- Based on: Weekend at Thrackley Alan Melville
- Produced by: Charles Reynolds
- Starring: John Justin; Barbara Murray; Ivor Barnard
- Cinematography: Ted Lloyd
- Edited by: John Shirley
- Music by: Ivor Slaney
- Production company: Charles Reynolds Productions
- Distributed by: Apex Film Distributors
- Release date: December 1952
- Running time: 65 minutes
- Country: United Kingdom
- Language: English

Hot Ice is a 1952 British second feature ('B') comedy crime film directed and written by Kenneth Hume and starring John Justin, Barbara Murray and Ivor Barnard. It was based on the 1934 novel Weekend at Thrackley by Alan Melville and its subsequent play version. An eccentric invites an assortment of guests to his country house, planning to rob them of their valuables.

== Plot ==
Edwin Carson, a shady jewel collector, invites hard-up Jim Henderson and his jewellery-heir pal Freddie Usher to spend the weekend at his country house, along with other guests who all own precious jewellery. Carson's motive is to extract the jewellery from his guests, but he is eventually thwarted.

== Cast ==
- John Justin as Jim Henderson
- Barbara Murray as Mary
- Ivor Barnard as Edwin Carson
- John Penrose as Freddie Usher
- Michael Balfour as Jacobson
- Gabrielle Brune as Marcella
- Anthony Pendrell as Burroughs
- Bill Shine as Henry
- Fred Gray
- Dorothy Wheatley as Marilyn
- Sam Kydd as Adams
- Derek Sydney as Kenrick
- Archie Duncan as Wilson
- Keith Grieve as constable #1
- Billy Howard as constable #2
- Ida Patlanski as Mrs. Bertram
- Freddie Tripp as club waiter
- Kendal Chalmers as man in club

== Reception ==
The Monthly Film Bulletin wrote: "The players do their best to infuse some life into the not very exciting or plausible plot of this thriller. It starts slowly and only gains momentum when the climax is reached. Barbara Murray puts some charm into a poorly written and over-talkative script."

Kine Weekly wrote: "The picture, adapted from a story by Alan Melville, is nearly all talk, but very few of the quips are sharp. The types, too, are very theatrical and accentuate the paucity of wit. The thrills, mainly mechanical, are also a trifle forced; but, even so, the odd mixture, handled by an equally screwy cast, becomes moderately enteriaining as it shuffles to its unexpected close. The unexacting should find it tolerably amusing if not hair-raising."

Picturegoer wrote: "First-Rate little thriller, as neatly scripted and directed as one could wish. The sets are much more real, the dialogue wittier, the action faster than is usual with British films of this type. The story is the familiar one of the strange weekend at a sinister country house with a still mere sinister owner. The film goes all out for laughs and thrills and gets them right to the end; a continuous tension builds up to a thrill-packed climax. Well acted, well made, this film is recommended."

Picture Show wrote: "Mildly amusing comedy thriller."

In British Sound Films: The Studio Years 1928–1959 David Quinlan rated the film as "average", writing: "Implausible comedy-thriller, neatly written and directed."
