= Weekend at Thrackley =

1934 novel

- Author: Alan Melville
- Language: English
- Genre: Detective
- Publisher: Skeffington & Son
- Publication date: 1934
- Publication place: United Kingdom
- Media type: Print
- Pages: 240

Weekend at Thrackley is a 1934 detective novel by the British writer Alan Melville. A whodunit with comic overtones, it takes the form of a country house mystery, a genre at its height during the decade. His debut novel, it was a commercial success and led to him giving up his job in the timber trade to become a full-time writer. It was reissued in 2018 by the British Library Publishing, as part of a group of crime novels from the Golden Age of Detective Fiction.

== Synopsis ==
Jim Henderson is one of six guests invited by Edwin Carson, an avid collector of precious gems to his gloomy country estate at Thrackley.

== Film adaptation ==
In 1952 it was adapted into the film Hot Ice directed by Kenneth Hume and starring John Justin, Barbara Murray and Ivor Barnard.

== Bibliography ==
- Clinton, Franz Anthony. British Thrillers, 1950-1979: 845 Films of Suspense, Mystery, Murder and Espionage. McFarland, 2020.
- Goble, Alan. The Complete Index to Literary Sources in Film. Walter de Gruyter, 1999.
- Hubin, Allen J. Crime Fiction, 1749-1980: A Comprehensive Bibliography. Garland Publishing, 1984.
