= Island in the Sun (film) =

1957 film by Robert Rossen

- Theatrical release poster by Jock Hinchliffe
- Directed by: Robert Rossen
- Screenplay by: Alfred Hayes
- Based on: Island in the Sun by Alec Waugh
- Produced by: Darryl F. Zanuck
- Starring: James Mason; Joan Fontaine; Dorothy Dandridge; Joan Collins; Michael Rennie; Harry Belafonte
- Cinematography: Freddie Young
- Edited by: Reginald Beck
- Music by: Malcolm Arnold
- Production company: Darryl F. Zanuck Productions
- Distributed by: 20th Century-Fox
- Release date: June 12, 1957
- Running time: 119 mins
- Countries: United States; Barbados; Grenada
- Language: English
- Budget: $2.25 million or $3 million
- Box office: $5 million (US and Canada rentals)

Island in the Sun is a 1957 American drama film produced by Darryl F. Zanuck and directed by Robert Rossen. It features an ensemble cast including James Mason, Harry Belafonte, Joan Fontaine, Joan Collins, Dorothy Dandridge, Michael Rennie, Stephen Boyd, Patricia Owens, John Justin, Diana Wynyard, John Williams, and Basil Sydney. The film is about race relations and interracial romance set in the fictitious island of Santa Marta. Barbados and Grenada were selected as the sites for the movie based on the 1955 novel by Alec Waugh. The film was controversial at the time of its release for its on-screen portrayal of interracial romance.

== Plot ==
During one spring in the 1950s the complex relationships of four couples, of black, white and mixed race, play out against the pronounced social inequality dividing the ruling British elite and the slave-descended native population of a small (fictitious) West Indian island.

Maxwell Fleury is a white plantation owner's son who suffers from an inferiority complex and makes rash decisions to prove his worth. He is tormented by the jealousy of his wife Sylvia, and is envious of his younger sister Jocelyn, who is being courted by the handsome, young, Oxford-bound Euan Templeton, newly arrived on Santa Marta to visit his father, Lord Templeton, the island's colonial governor.

David Boyeur, an ambitious and self-advancing young black union leader emerging as a powerful politician, is diplomatically courted by Templeton yet seen by some as a threat to the white ruling class. Mavis Norman, the widow of the deceased elder scion of the Fleury plantation, Arthur, develops a romantic interest in David that leads to both attraction and tension between the two.

Denis Archer, the governor's aide-de-camp and want-to-be novelist, becomes smitten by Margot Seaton, a mixed-race beauty seeking to better her position in life through hard work over irrepressible feminine charm. He wins her away from David and gets her a job as a secretary in the governor's office.

Insecure in his marriage, Maxwell magnifies a case of mistaken identity into the obsession that his wife is having an affair with Hilary Carson, an attractive and single former war hero. He strangles Carson during a quarrel, then tries to make it look like a robbery. Colonel Whittingham, the cagey chief of police, investigates the crime as a murder. Soon, he begins dropping telling hints to Maxwell drawn from Dostoevsky's Crime and Punishment.

Euan falls heavily for Jocelyn, who puts off his proposal of marriage, to be sure "everything is right".

Maxwell decides to run for the legislature. A visiting American journalist, Bradshaw, writes an exposé revealing that Maxwell's paternal grandmother was part black, which is resignedly confirmed by the senior Fleury. At a campaign rally Maxwell first publicly embraces his newfound bi-racial identity, but is jeered by a black crowd egged on by David, which rejects his embrace. Humiliated, he then denounces his black heritage and insults everyone there.

Jocelyn learns she is pregnant by Euan, but, with a title and seat in the House of Lords lying ahead for him, does not wish to burden him with a child of mixed race. Seeking to eliminate this roadblock to marriage and her daughter's happiness, her mother reveals to her that Julian Fleury was not her father but a fully white Englishman instead, the result of a secret affair.

Maxwell realizes he has been cornered by Whittingham. A broken man, he attempts to muster the will for suicide, but fails. Resolved to his fate, he arranges to surrender to the police.

Jocelyn and Euan wed, then board a plane to England, followed up the gangway by the also newly married Margot and Denis, on to their own new life together there.

Mavis presses her campaign to become serious with David but he rejects her advances, maintaining he must stay within his own race to be accepted by his people. Ruefully, she accepts his rebuff, and, hurt by his jilt, leaves him behind at their rendezvous at the beach. David is left to walk back alone to town in the dying light approaching dusk.

== Cast ==
- James Mason as Maxwell Fleury, a hot-tempered but insecure scion of the elite Fleury family.
- Harry Belafonte as David Boyeur, a black politician leading the lower class, who is attracted to Mavis Norman.
- Joan Fontaine as Mavis Norman, an elite white woman who lacks direction in her life, and is drawn towards the magnetism of David Boyeur.
- Joan Collins as Jocelyn Fleury, the alluring sister of Maxwell, who falls in love with Euan Templeton.
- Dorothy Dandridge as Margot Seaton, a beautiful West Indian, who is pursued by Denis Archer, the governor's aide-de-camp.
- Michael Rennie as Hilary Carson, a retired war hero, whom Maxwell fears is having an affair with his wife, Sylvia.
- Patricia Owens as Sylvia Fleury, the wife of Maxwell, who Maxwell fears is having an affair with Hilary Carson.
- John Justin as Denis Archer, the governor's aide and want-to-be novelist drawn to Margot Seaton.
- Stephen Boyd as Euan, Lord Templeton, the governor's visiting son, who falls in love with Jocelyn Fleury.
- Diana Wynyard as Mrs. Fleury, wife of Julian and mother of Maxwell and Jocelyn, by all appearances a staid matriarch and pillar of the community.
- Basil Sydney as Julian Fleury, the husband of Mrs. Fleury and father of Maxwell and Jocelyn, patriarch of the Fleury plantation.
- John Williams as Colonel Whittingham, the head of police, who investigates Hilary Carson's murder.
- Ronald Squire as Lord Templeton, the governor of the island, and Euan's father.
- Hartley Power as Bradshaw, an American journalist visiting Santa Marta.

== Production ==
=== Original novel ===
The novel was published in January 1956. The New York Times called it an "absorbing good reading and a considerable achievement in its own right." The Los Angeles Times called it "strong, suspenseful." The book sold over 900,000 copies.

=== Development ===
Darryl F. Zanuck purchased screen rights to the novel for 20th Century Fox in May 1955, prior to publication. However, by that stage it had already been accepted for serialization and was the Literary Guild and Reader's Digest Guild choice. Waugh received $140,000 for the rights.

Zanuck said he was attracted to the novel because it contained multiple stories. "I like multiple stories", he said. "Either a story should concentrate on two people or it should for me at least have a number of people dramatically integrated. I don't mean the Grand Hotel type of story but people whose lives and emotions – the drama of the story – are knit together."

He went on to say that there were fourteen major parts, "and six of them it would be difficult to say who was the most important." He also liked the fact the book had "a novel and attractive background" which would suit filming in color and CinemaScope, and that the novel tackled miscegenation.

"Our picture is highly controversial, but then I've made controversial pictures before", said Zanuck, who had made Grapes of Wrath, Gentleman's Agreement and Pinky. "I don't know whether I'll ever be able to show the film in the south and it may be objected to in other areas but I am taking my chances because I believe this great story... If a picture has real significance and genuine theme and purpose, my contention is that it can be made no matter how controversial."

He also said "it is not basically a picture about the color problem but it would not be possible to make a film about the West Indies without dealing with the color question. It is the essence of the life of the place."

In July 1955 Alfred Hayes was signed to write the script.

Zanuck eventually left Fox to return to producing. As part of his agreement with Fox, he took the rights to Island in the Sun. It was going to be the second of three films he was going to produce, the first being The Sun Also Rises and the third The Secret Crimes of Josef Stalin. In the end Island would be made before Sun Also Rises and the Stalin project was never filmed.

In July 1956 Robert Rossen was hired to direct. Zanuck said Rossen's "reputation was largely made on offbeat, unorthodox subjects—which this is—and I had confidence, which for a producer is absolutely essential, that he was the man."

=== Casting ===
This was Dorothy Dandridge's "comeback" movie, as she hadn't made a film since 1954's Carmen Jones, in which she played the lead. In 1955, she had been offered supporting roles in The King and I and The Lieutenant Wore Skirts but Otto Preminger, Carmen Jones' director and her lover, advised her to turn down the roles. Dandridge was billed third, in an ensemble cast of stars.

Many of the lead actors were under contract to Fox, including Joan Collins, Michael Rennie, John Justin and Stephen Boyd.

Zanuck said in October 1956 "Ridding myself of the obligation of conducting a large film establishment like 20th Century Fox hasn't meant any cessation of work. I have seldom done as much travelling as I expect to do in the next few weeks and that's because we are really trying to make this picture really come alive as a big tropical island exploit."

=== Filming ===
Filming started 15 October in the West Indies. The film was shot on location in Barbados and Grenada then in late November the unit shifted to London for studio work. The budget was $3 million. The movie opens with stock aerial footage from Jamaica.

== Reception ==
As a result of playing interracial love scenes with Harry Belafonte, Joan Fontaine received poison pen mail, including some purported threats from the Ku Klux Klan. Fontaine turned the letters over to the FBI.

The film received mixed reviews and its interracial themes meant it found initial difficulty in being booked in theaters in the Southern United States. The film also received protests prior to its opening in the North in St Paul-Minneapolis. It was banned in Memphis, Tennessee as "too frank a depiction of miscegenation, offensive to moral standards, and no good for either white or Negro." Zanuck had previously said he would pay the fines of any theatre owners fined for showing the film.

=== Box office ===
Premiering in June 1957, Island in the Sun was a major box office success, opening at number one in the country with a first week gross of almost $500,000 in the 16 cities that Variety reported. The film earned $5,550,000 worldwide, representing roughly a 100% profit over its cost of production, and finished as the sixth highest-grossing film of 1957.

It was the 8th most popular movie in Britain of that year.

== Legacy ==
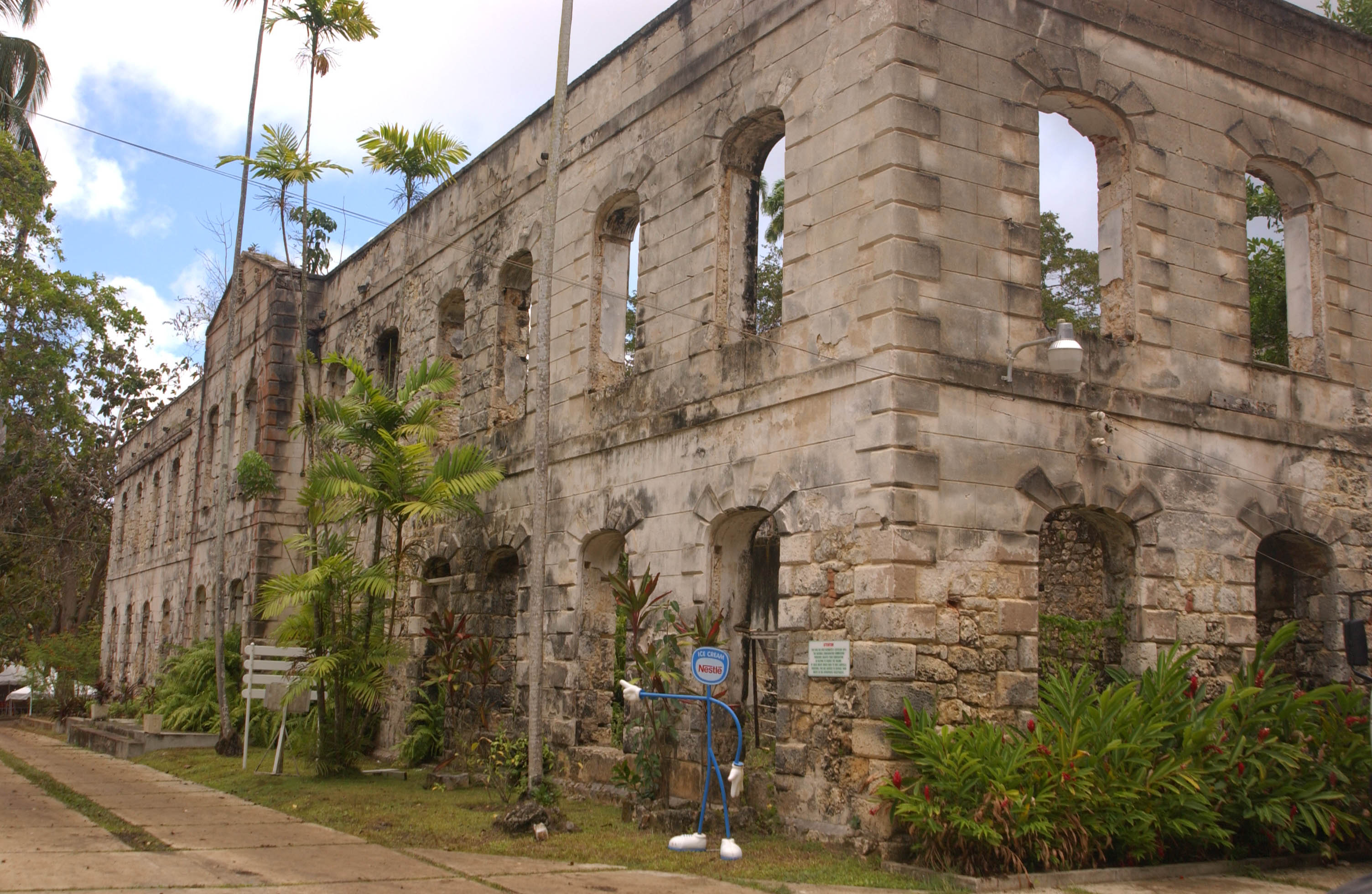
The ruins of the Farley Hill mansion, which stood in for the Maxwell Fleury estate Bel Fontaine in the film

A proposal was floated in 2009 to demolish the remains of the mansion used in the film, at Farley Hill, Barbados, for the Maxwell Fleury estate Bel Fontaine. It was gutted by fire in the mid-1960s, and all that remains are the foundations and exterior walls.

== Music ==
The title song "Island in the Sun" was written by Harry Belafonte and Irving Burgie. There are now over 40 cover versions recorded by various artist such as The Merrymen, José Carreras, Caterina Valente in German, Henri Salvador in French ("Une île au soleil") and The Righteous Brothers, just to name a few. It briefly was featured (and parodied) in the 1992 film The Muppet Christmas Carol.

== See also ==
- List of American films of 1957
