= The Partner (1963 film) =

1963 British film by Gerard Glaister

- Theatrical release poster
- Directed by: Gerard Glaister
- Screenplay by: John Roddick
- Based on: A Million Dollar Story by Edgar Wallace
- Produced by: Jack Greenwood
- Starring: Yoko Tani; Guy Doleman; Ewan Roberts
- Cinematography: James Wilson
- Edited by: Derek Holding
- Production company: Merton Park Studios
- Distributed by: Anglo-Amalgamated
- Release date: 1963
- Running time: 57 minutes
- Country: United Kingdom
- Language: English

The Partner is a 1963 British film directed by Gerard Glaister and starring Yoko Tani, Guy Doleman and Ewan Roberts. Part of the series of Edgar Wallace Mysteries films made at Merton Park Studios, it is based on a 1926 novel A Million Dollar Story by Wallace.

== Plot ==
Film director Wayne Douglas is shooting a film starring Lin Siyan when his accountant Charles Briers is found murdered. It seems that the motive for the murder was a large sum of money which Briers was holding as part of a tax-avoidance scheme for Douglas. Douglas's wife Helen has hired private detective Richard Webb to investigate the affair she believes her husband is having with Lin. Douglas also hires Webb to locate the missing money.

== Cast ==
- Yoko Tani as Lin Siyan
- Guy Doleman as Wayne Douglas
- Ewan Roberts as Detective Inspector Simons
- Mark Eden as Richard Webb
- Anthony Booth as Buddy Forrester
- Helen Lindsay as Helen Douglas
- Noel Johnson as Charles Briers
- Denis Holmes as Detective Sergeant Rigby
- John Forgeham as Adrian Marlowe
- Virginia Wetherell as Karen
- Yvette Wyatt as Pam
- Norman Scace as Dr Ambrose
- John Forbes-Robertson as Alwood
- Brian Haines as surgeon
- Earl Green as Peter
- Neil Wilson as security officer
- Guy Standeven as counterhand
- Norma Parnell as day nurse

== Critical reception ==
The Monthly Film Bulletin wrote: "A routine whodunnit which lacks any sort of suspense or excitement, and is much too talkative. There are numerous shots of Merton Park Studios, where "W. D. Productions" are presumed to operate."
