= Top Secret (play) =

1949 play

- Original language: English
- Written by: Alan Melville
- Genre: Comedy

Premiere
- Date: 29 August 1949
- Place: Theatre Royal, Newcastle

Top Secret is a comedy play by Alan Melville which was first performed in 1949. It is a farce revolving around an ambassador.

It premiered at the Theatre Royal, Newcastle before transferring to the Winter Garden Theatre in London's West End where it ran for 21 performances between 19 October and 5 November 1949. The original West End cast included Tom Gill, Hugh Wakefield, Frederick Valk and Beryl Measor. It was not well-received, and was reportedly booed by audiences on its opening night. A review in The Stage considered it was too long and needed speeding up. Its short run was in contrast to Melville's other play of 1949, Castle in the Air which was a hit running for nearly 300 performances.

== Bibliography ==
- Wearing, J.P. The London Stage 1940-1949: A Calendar of Productions, Performers, and Personnel. Rowman & Littlefield, 2014.
