= Ewan Roberts =

Scottish actor (1914–1983)

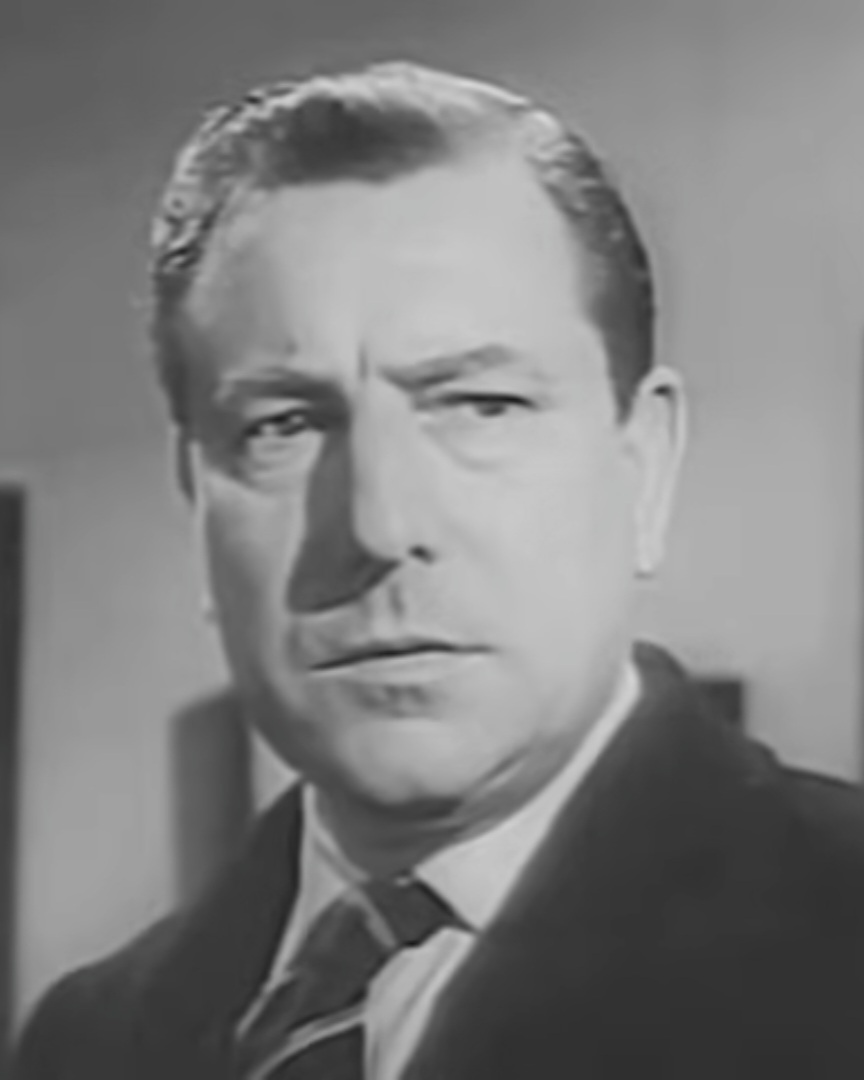
- Roberts in an episode of One Step Beyond (1960)
- Born: Thomas Robert McEwan Hutchison; 29 April 1914; Edinburgh, Scotland
- Died: 10 January 1983 (aged 68); London, England
- Occupations: Stage actor Film actor Television actor
- Years active: 1935 – 1982
- Spouse: Margery Vosper 1948-1981 (2 children)

Ewan Roberts (29 April 1914 – 10 January 1983) was a Scottish stage, film and television actor. On stage from 1935, his theatre work included a season with the Old Vic, in 1946–1947. In 1949 he appeared at the Adelphi Theatre in Castle in the Air. Between 1954 and 1956 he played the part of Inspector Ames in the TV series Colonel March of Scotland Yard, starring Boris Karloff. It premiered at 7.45pm on Saturday 24 September 1955 on the newly opened ITV London station Associated Television.

== Selected filmography ==
- London Belongs to Me (1948) – 1st Policeman (uncredited)
- Shadow of the Eagle (1950) – Ship's Doctor
- The Man in the White Suit (1951) – Fotheringay
- Angels One Five (1952) – Medical Officer
- Castle in the Air (1952) – Menzies
- Derby Day (1952) – Studio Driver
- The Crimson Pirate (1952) – Claw Paw
- The Titfield Thunderbolt (1953) – Alec Pearce
- The Heart of the Matter (1953) – Druce (uncredited)
- Views on Trial (1954) – Victor Skyway
- River Beat (1954) – Customs Insp. J.S. Blake
- The Ladykillers (1955) – Constable (uncredited)
- Port of Escape (1956) – Sergeant Rutherford
- High Tide at Noon (1957) – Fred (uncredited)
- Let's Be Happy (1957) – Hotel Porter
- Night of the Demon (1957) – Lloyd Williamson
- What a Whopper (1961) – Jimmy
- The Traitors (1962) – Col. Burlinson
- The Day of the Triffids (1962) – Dr. Soames
- The Partner (1963) – Inspector Simons
- Five to One (1963) – Deighton
- The Three Lives of Thomasina (1963) – Constable McQuarrie
- Hostile Witness (1968) – Hamish Gillespie
- Country Dance (1970) – Committee Member
- Adolf Hitler – My Part in His Downfall (1973) – Major McDougal
- The Internecine Project (1974) – Lab technician
- The Agatha Christie Hour (1982) as McKern
