= Archie Duncan (actor) =

Scottish actor (1914–1979)

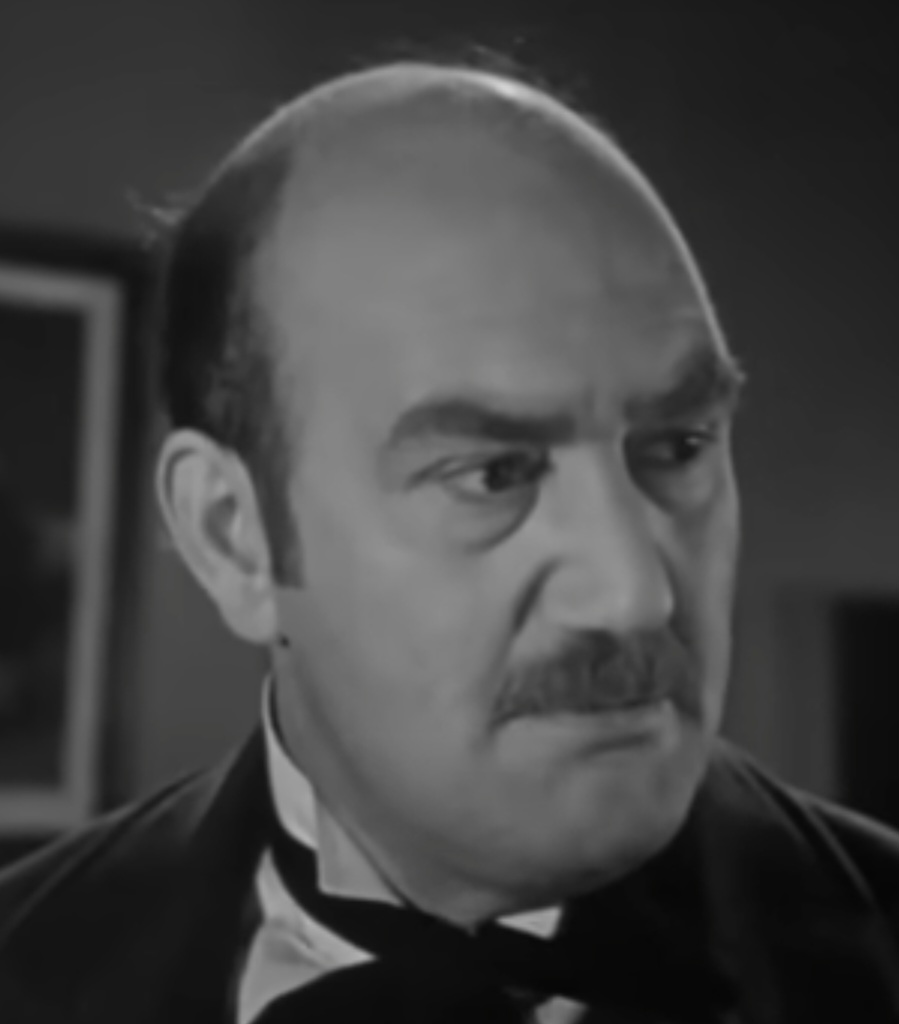
- Duncan in an episode of Sherlock Holmes (1954)
- Born: 26 May 1914; Glasgow, Lanarkshire, Scotland
- Died: 24 July 1979 (aged 65); London, England
- Occupation: Actor
- Years active: 1948–1975

Archie Duncan (26 May 1914 – 24 July 1979) was a Scottish actor.

He was born in Glasgow. Duncan's father was a regimental sergeant major in the army and his mother was a postmistress. He attended Glasgow's Govan High School and worked as a welder in Glasgow shipyards for a decade.

He began his career in repertory theatre and West End plays. His professional acting debut was in Juno and the Paycock in May 1944 at the Alhambra Theatre, Glasgow.

Although he appeared in over 50 television series and movie roles, he is best remembered for Inspector Lestrade in the 1954 series Sherlock Holmes and Little John in The Adventures of Robin Hood from 1955 to 1959.

Duncan was replaced in the Little John role by Rufus Cruikshank for 10 episodes after Duncan was injured when a horse bolted toward spectators, mostly children, watching the location filming of the episode "Checkmate" on 20 April 1955. He grabbed the bridle, stopping the horse, but the cart it was pulling ran over him causing a fractured kneecap and cuts and bruises. He received the Queen's Commendation for Brave Conduct and £1,360 in damages from Sapphire films.

He also played the ditch digger in the 1969 film Ring of Bright Water who dispatched the star otter Mij with his spade, towards the end.

On 24 July 1979, aged 65, Duncan died at his London home.

== Filmography ==
Year	Title	Role	Notes		
1948	Counterblast	Dr. McKegney	Uncredited		
1949	Operation Diamond	McPherson			
1949	Floodtide	Charlie Campbell			
1949	The Bad Lord Byron	John Murray			
1950	The Gorbals Story	Bull			
1950	The Elusive Pimpernel	Man in bath			
1951	Happy Go Lovely	Police Inspector	Uncredited		
1951	Flesh and Blood	Sergeant			
1951	Circle of Danger	Angus	Uncredited		
1951	The Lavender Hill Mob	Chief Cashier	Uncredited		
1951	Green Grow the Rushes	Constable Pettigrew			
1952	The Last Page	Police Constable	Uncredited		
1952	The Story of Robin Hood	Red Gill			
1952	Home at Seven	Station Sergeant	Uncredited		
1952	Castle in the Air	Constable			
1952	You're Only Young Twice				
1952	The Brave Don't Cry	Walter Hardie			
1952	Hot Ice	Wilson			
1953	Street Corner	Chief Inspector	Uncredited		
1953	Laxdale Hall	Police Sergeant			
1953	Johnny on the Run	The Crofter			
1953	Twice Upon a Time	Doorman			
1953	Counterspy	Jim Fenton			
1953	The Master of Ballantrae	Messenger	Uncredited		
1953	Rob Roy: The Highland Rogue	Dugal MacGregor			
1954	Trouble in the Glen	Nolly Dukes			
1956	X the Unknown	Sgt. Yeardye	Uncredited		
1957	The Devil's Pass	George Jolly			
1957	Saint Joan	Robert de Baudricourt			
1958	Harry Black	Woolsey			
1959	John Paul Jones	Duncan MacBean			
1960	The Boy and the Pirates	Scoggins		1960	‘’Black Saddle ‘’
1960	Tess of the Storm Country	Hamish MacLean			
1961	Very Important Person	Scottish Captain	Uncredited		
1961	What a Whopper	Macdonald			
1962	Postman's Knock	Inspector			
1963	The Mouse on the Moon	USAF General			
1963	Lancelot and Guinevere	Sir Lamorak			
1964	The Horror of It All	Muldoon Marley			
1967	The Man Outside	Supt. Barnes			
1969	Ring of Bright Water	Roadmender			
1975	The Wilby Conspiracy	Gordon	(final film role)		
