= Before the Fringe =

Before the Fringe is a BBC television series which ran for two series on BBC2 in 1967.

The first series ran for eight episodes between 30 January and 20 March 1967. The second series of six episodes ran between 18 September and 23 October 1967.

Alan Melville was the guiding light behind this series which attempted to showcase on television some of the best aspects of pre-Beyond the Fringe revue. Before the 1960s Cambridge Footlights graduates took it by storm, the medium had been a much more gentler, broader affair.

These two series of sketches were made up by performers who had been veterans of such shows. They included:

- Alan Melville (all programmes)
- Joan Sims (seven programmes)
- Ronnie Barker (six programmes)
- Dora Bryan (five programmes)
- Beryl Reid (four programmes)
- Douglas Byng (four programmes)
- Hermione Baddeley (four programmes)
- Hugh Paddick (three programmes)
- Dilys Laye (three programmes)
- Hermione Gingold (two programmes)
- Cicely Courtneidge (two programmes)
- Betty Marsden (two programmes)
- Eunice Gayson (two programmes)

Various guest stars were featured, including Robert Dorning, Stanley Holloway, Thora Hird, Brenda Bruce, Wilfrid Brambell, Dame Edith Evans, Bud Flanagan, Peter Jones, Patrick Cargill and Barbara Windsor.

== Bibliography ==
Mark Lewisohn, Radio Times Guide To TV Comedy, 2005 (ISBN 0563487550)
