= Roy Rich =

Roy Rich (16 September 1911 – 24 March 1970) was a British broadcaster and film and theatre director.

== Life and career ==
Rich was born in Plymouth, Devon, the son of a music hall comedian. Educated at Dulwich College, southeast London, he became involved in acting at an early age, making his theatrical debut in 1923. He was subsequently involved in theatre for several years.

Rich was a pioneering broadcaster for the BBC, as one of the first radio DJs. During the Second World War, he was standing in as a news announcer when Broadcasting House was hit by a bomb during the 9:00 p.m. news broadcast. He presented Children Calling Home, a series of wartime radio broadcasts featuring conversations between evacuees and their parents. In 1964, he became head of BBC Light Entertainments (Sound), a post which he held until his retirement in 1967.

Rich died from cancer in hospital in Stratford-upon-Avon in 1970, aged 58. He was married to actress Brenda Bruce; they had twin daughters.

== Film and television credits ==
- My Brother's Keeper (1948) - dialogue director
- Broken Journey (1948) - associate producer
- Miranda (1948) - associate producer
- It's Not Cricket (1949) - director
- Stranger from Venus (1954) - associate producer
- Double Profile (1954) - director
- The Sergeant and the Spy (1954) - director
- Phantom Caravan (1954) - director
- Rheingold Theatre (1955) - 6 episodes

== Theatre credits ==
- Black and Blue (London Hippodrome, 1939)
- The Diary of a Scoundrel (The Garden Theatre, 1949)
- Castle in the Air (Adelphi Theatre, 1950)
- Thieves' Carnival (Arts Theatre, 1952)
- Hobson's Choice (Arts Theatre, 1952)
- As Long As They're Happy (King's Theatre, Glasgow, 1953)
- Trial and Error (King's Theatre, Glasgow, 1953)
