= Death Goes to School =

1953 British film by Stephen Clarkson

- Film poster
- Directed by: Stephen Clarkson
- Written by: Maisie Sharman; Stephen Clarkson
- Based on: novel Death in Seven Hours by Stratford Davis
- Produced by: Victor Hanbury
- Starring: Barbara Murray; Gordon Jackson; Pamela Alan
- Cinematography: Eric Cross
- Edited by: Peter Seabourne
- Music by: De Wolfe
- Production company: Independent Artists
- Distributed by: Eros Films (UK)
- Release date: May 1953 (UK)
- Running time: 64 minutes
- Country: United Kingdom
- Language: English

Death Goes to School (also known as One is Guilty) is a 1953 British second feature ('B') mystery film directed by Stephen Clarkson and starring Barbara Murray, Gordon Jackson and Pamela Alan. It was written by Maisie Sharman and Clarkson based on the 1952 novel Death in Seven Hours by Stratford Davis, and was made at Merton Park Studios.

== Plot ==
Police investigate the death of a tyrannical teacher at a girls school, where any number of people might have killed the dead woman.

== Cast ==
- Barbara Murray as Miss Shepherd
- Gordon Jackson as Detective Inspector Campbell
- Pamela Alan as Miss Helen Cooper
- Jane Aird as Miss M. Halstead
- Beatrice Varley as Miss Hopkinson
- Anne Butchart as Miss Oliphant
- Imogene Moynihan as Miss Essex
- Jenine Matto as Miss Stanislaus
- Sam Kydd as Sergeant Harvey
- Robert Long as Mr. Lawley
- Nina Parry as Mary
- Stanley Rose as Inspector Burgess
- Enid Stewart as Mrs. White
- Julie Stewart as Mrs. White
- Sandra Whipp as Brenda
- Pauline Winter as Mrs. Lawley

== Reception ==
Kinematograph Weekly said: "Unhurried but reasonably well acted, it holds the interest even if it fails to chill the spine".

Monthly Film Bulletin wrote: "As a thriller this is poor, the successive interviewing of the suspects one by one inducing positive tedium. The film, however, has one bright aspect: the amusing caricature of girls' school life it provides."

Picturegoer wrote: "Barbara Murray gives an intelligent and credible characterization as one of the suspects. And the cast as a whole is efficient, but too verbose."

Picture Show wrote: "'The school backgrounds are authentic, and the petty niggling and feuds of the mistresses seem very real also. It is well told, with tension and humour intermingling. Well acted and neatly directed."

The Daily Film Renter wrote: "Not many fireworks are found in the story, but it proceeds gently along and we learn a good deal about school life through the eyes of the teachers. The film is pleasantly acted but the dialogue too often betrays its literary parentage."

In British Sound Films David Quinlan described the film as: "Verbose, monotonous whodunnit."
