= The Assassination Option =

2014 novel by W.E.B. Griffin and William E. Butterworth IV

- First edition
- Author: W.E.B. Griffin and William E. Butterworth IV
- Language: English
- Series: Clandestine Operations Series
- Genre: Spy novel
- Publisher: G. P. Putnam's Sons
- Publication date: December 30, 2014
- Publication place: United States
- Media type: Print (hardcover)
- Pages: 496 pp (first edition, hardcover)
- ISBN: 978-0399171246
- Preceded by: Top Secret (2014)

The Assassination Option is the second novel in the Clandestine Operations Series by W.E.B. Griffin and William E. Butterworth IV.

== Plot ==
The novel centers around Capt. James Cronley, who has been promoted to commander of a new unit in the new Central Intelligence Agency. As the chief of DCI Europe, Cronley has to deal with all sorts of intrigue, much of it involving U.S. government and military personnel unhappy with the creation and power of the new CIA. Cronley, as well as his coworkers and employees, have a new mission: to bring the family of a Soviet informant out of East Germany. In the process, Cronley must fend off attempts to undermine his authority. Cronley's mother was a German national and he runs into numerous German relatives, finding that some of them are not what they seem.

== Reviews ==
Kirkus Reviews left a relatively positive review, though they pointed out numerous historical errors.

Book Reporter also left a positive review, saying, "It reads well and reminds us of the difficulty posed in intelligence work, especially at the beginning of the Cold War with Russia."

Publishers Weekly has a positive view of this book, saying, "It's a testament to the authors' skill and wide experience that the pages seem to turn themselves."
