= Margot Bennett (writer) =

Scottish-born screenwriter and author (1912–1980)

- Born: Margot Mitchell; 19 January 1912; Lenzie, Dunbartonshire, Scotland
- Died: 6 December 1980 (aged 68); Camden, London
- Occupation: author
- Spouse: Richard Bennett (1937–1980; her death)
- Children: 4
- Writing career
- Language: English
- Period: 1943–1968
- Genres: crime, thriller, science fiction
- Notable awards: Gold Dagger Award

Margot Bennett (19 January 1912 – 6 December 1980), born Margot Mitchell, was a Scottish-born screenwriter and author of crime and thriller novels.

== Early life ==
Margot Mitchell (sometimes called Margot Miller) was born in Lenzie, Dunbartonshire, Scotland. She was educated in Scotland and in Australia.

== Career ==
Before publishing fiction, Bennett worked as an advertising copywriter in Sydney and London. During the Spanish Civil War, she worked as a nurse, translator, and broadcaster for the Spanish Medical Aid. During her war nursing work, she broke her arm when a truck overturned, and she was shot in both legs.

Bennett was a regular writer for Lilliput magazine between 1943 and 1950. She is best remembered for her crime fiction from the 1940s and 1950s, though she also wrote contemporary literature, thrillers and a science guide, The Intelligent Woman's Guide to Atomic Radiation (1964). She wrote two science fiction novels, one of which was The Long Way Back, about African colonization of Britain following a nuclear holocaust. Her novel The Man Who Didn't Fly was nominated for a Gold Dagger Award. In a 1962 review essay in The New York Times, Anthony Boucher counted Bennett among "the best Englishwomen in the suspense field," alongside Charity Blackstock, Nina Bawden, and Joan Fleming.

Bennett wrote scripts for television, including contributions to Maigret, Emergency-Ward 10, Market in Honey Lane and Quick Before They Catch Us. In early 1964, she was the second female writer to be associated with Doctor Who, though the historical story she was scheduled to contribute never went ahead. Bennett also wrote the screenplays for her books which were adapted for the screen.

== Personal life ==
During the Spanish Civil War, Margot Miller met Richard Lawrence Bennett (1912–1999), an English journalist and writer who had served in the Spanish Republican Army since 1936. During the conflict, he had written broadcasts for Radio Catalan. They were married in 1937 in Barcelona, the ceremony being conducted by a Republican soldier. They had three sons and a daughter. One of her sons, Rob, died from muscular dystrophy.

Bennett was a supporter of left-wing politics, including the Campaign for Nuclear Disarmament. Bennett lived in London in her later life. She died there in 1980, aged 68 years.

== Bibliography ==
=== Novels ===
Title	Date	Genre	Publisher	ISBN	Notes
Time to Change Hats	1945	Crime	Nicholson		Features John Davies
Away Went the Little Fish	1946	Crime	Nicholson		Features John Davies
The Golden Pebble	1948	Thriller	Nicholson		Not published in the USA
The Widow of Bath	1952	Crime	Eyre & Spottiswoode	0754085929	Adapted into a TV serial in 1959
	2021		British Library Publishing	0712353747	Reissued.
Farewell Crown and Goodbye King	1952	Thriller	Eyre & Spottiswoode		
The Long Way Back	1955	Science Fiction	The Bodley Head		
The Man Who Didn't Fly	1955	Thriller	Eyre & Spottiswoode	0745186246	Shortlisted for Gold Dagger Award. Adapted into a TV episode by Kraft Theatre in 1958.
	2020		British Library Publishing	0712353410	Reissued.
Someone from the Past	1958	Crime	Eyre & Spottiswoode	0754086046	Won Gold Dagger Award
That Summer's Earthquake	1964	Literary Fiction	Eyre & Spottiswoode	085456733X	Not published in the US
The Intelligent Woman's Guide to Atomic Radiation	1964	Science	Penguin		
The Furious Masters	1968	Science Fiction	Eyre & Spottiswoode	0413443000	Published in Dutch in 1970

=== Short stories ===
Title	Date	Genre	Published	Notes
An Old Fashioned Poker for my Uncle's Head	1946	Science Fiction	Lilliput, issue #110	Reprinted 1954 in The Magazine of Fantasy & Science Fiction, issue #36)
No Bath for the Browns	1945	Thriller	Lilliput, issue #101	Reprinted 1965 in Alfred Hitchcock Presents Stories Not for the Nervous

=== Television Projects Contributed To ===
Series	No. of episodes	Broadcast Date(s)	Notes
London Playhouse	1 (anthology)	1956	Episode: The Sun Divorce. Believed to be lost
The Man who Didn't Fly	1 (anthology)	1958	Episode of Kraft Theatre. Based on her own novel
Emergency-Ward 10	15	1958–1959	
The Widow of Bath	6	1959	Based on her own novel. All episodes lost
The Third Man	2	1959	
They Met in a City	1 (anthology)	1961	Episode: The Spanish Waiter
Suspense	1 (anthology)	1962	Episode: Killer in the Band
Maigret	7	1960–1962	
The Flying Swan	1	1965	
The Big Spender	5	1966	All episodes lost
Quick Before They Catch Us	4	1966	Serial: The Tungsten Ring. All episodes lost
Market in Honey Lane	7	1968	

=== Screenplays ===
- The Man Who Liked Funerals (1959)
- The Crowning Touch (1959)
