= The Widow of Bath (TV series) =

1959 British TV thriller series

- Genre: Thriller
- Based on: The Widow of Bath by Margot Bennett
- Written by: Margot Bennett
- Starring: Guy Rolfe; Barbara Murray; John Justin
- Composer: Ron Grainer
- Country of origin: United Kingdom
- Original language: English
- No. of series: 1
- No. of episodes: 6

Production
- Producer: Gerard Glaister
- Production company: BBC

Original release
- Network: BBC Television Service
- Release: 1 June – 6 July 1959

The Widow of Bath is a British thriller television series that first aired on the BBC in six episodes between 1 June and 6 July 1959. Margot Bennett adapted her own 1952 novel of the same title. The show starred Guy Rolfe, Barbara Murray and John Justin. Art director Roy Oxley designed the sets. It is now considered lost.

== Cast ==
- Guy Rolfe as Charles Atkinson (6 episodes)
- Barbara Murray as Lucy Bath (6 episodes)
- John Justin as Hugh Everton (6 episodes)
- Peter Sallis as Cady (6 episodes)
- Walter Horsbrugh as Simmons (6 episodes)
- Jennifer Wright as Jan Deverill (6 episodes)
- Arthur Shepherd as Myopic waiter (6 episodes)
- Fay Compton as Mrs Leonard (5 episodes)
- Andrew Cruickshank as DI Leigh (5 episodes)
- William Sherwood as Hotel manager (5 episodes)
- George Roderick as Guido (4 episodes)
- John Forbes-Robertson as Police Constable (3 episodes)
- John Ebdon as DS Harkness (3 episodes)
- Lesley Nunnerley as Zoe (3 episodes)
- Fred Ferris as Bathing-hut attendant (2 episodes)
- David Davenport as English waiter (2 episodes)
- Malcolm Keen as Gregory Bath (1 episode)
- Robert Vahey as Photographer (1 episode)
- Freda Bamford as Customer (1 episode)
- Harry Littlewood as Peters (1 episode)
- Van Boolen as Castros (1 episode)
- John Kidd as Stokes (1 episode)

== Bibliography ==
- Reilly, John M. Twentieth Century Crime & Mystery Writers. Springer, 2015.
