= The Crowning Touch =

1959 British film by David Eady

- Original British lobby card
- Directed by: David Eady
- Written by: Margot Bennett
- Produced by: Jon Penington
- Starring: Ted Ray; Greta Gynt; Griffith Jones; Dermot Walsh; Irene Handl
- Cinematography: Ernest Palmer
- Edited by: John Pomeroy
- Music by: Edwin Astley
- Production company: Crescent Films
- Distributed by: Butcher's Film Service(UK)
- Release date: June 1959
- Running time: 75 minutes
- Country: United Kingdom
- Language: English

The Crowning Touch is a 1959 British comedy film directed by David Eady and starring Ted Ray, Irene Handl and Greta Gynt. It was written by Margot Bennett.

== Plot ==
The "Crowning Touch" of the title is a fancy ladies hat. It has been ordered and specially set aside at a posh British hat shop, but no one has come to collect it. Three of the shop's staff offer different reasons as to why the pretty young girl who'd ordered the hat never showed up.

== Cast ==
- Ted Ray as Bert
- Greta Gynt as Rosie
- Griffith Jones as Mark
- Sydney Tafler as Joe
- Dermot Walsh as Aubrey Drake
- Maureen Connell as Julia
- Colin Gordon as Stacey
- Irene Handl as Bebe
- Allan Cuthbertson as Philip
- Diane Hart as Tess
- Joan Benham as Daphne
- Maurice Kaufmann as David

== Critical reception ==
The Monthly Film Bulletin wrote: "This quartet of magazine stories is smoothly linked by a generally amusing and entertaining script, while the production's acting and technical qualities are passably good."

Allmovie called the film "a serviceable British shaggy-dog story, graced by the presence of such top talents as Greta Gynt, Griffith Jones, Sydney Tafler, Dermot Walsh and Irene Handl."

In British Sound Films: The Studio Years 1928–1959 David Quinlan rated the film as "average", writing: "passes the time agreeably; nothing special."

TV Guide called it an "okay English comedy ... A number of distinguished performers lift this one above the average."
