= The Furious Masters =

1968 novel by Margot Bennett

- First edition
- Author: Margot Bennett
- Cover artist: Richard Weaver
- Language: English
- Genre: science fiction
- Published: 1968
- Publisher: Eyre & Spottiswoode
- Publication place: United Kingdom
- Pages: 240
- ISBN: 0 4134 4300 0

The Furious Masters is a science fiction novel by Margot Bennett. Published in 1968, it was Bennett's second work of science fiction and her final novel.

== Plot ==
The calm existence of the small Yorkshire town of Higherfield is shattered when a strange spacecraft crashes nearby. Whilst an avalanche of publicity sweeps in, events take a sinister turn when one of the discoverers of the object becomes insane, and riots and hysteria begin to sweep the country, to the great consternation of the previously unconcerned Prime Minister, who soon finds himself in the thick of the conundrum.

== Availability ==
The novel was published in Dutch in 1970, as Bacillen in infrarood (literally Bacilli in Infrared). The novel is no longer in print.

== After ==
The novel made little impact. Although Bennett lived for another twelve years, she published nothing further.
