= Someone from the Past =

1958 novel

- First edition (UK)
- Author: Margot Bennett
- Cover artist: Albany Wiseman
- Language: English
- Genre: Crime
- Published: 1958
- Publisher: Eyre & Spottiswoode (UK); E. P. Dutton (US)
- Publication place: United Kingdom
- Media type: Print
- Pages: 191
- ISBN: 0 7540 8604 6

Someone from the Past is a 1958 detective novel by the Scottish author Margot Bennett.

== Premise ==
The novel's narrator, Nancy, meets up with an old friend, Sarah, in a restaurant one night. The next morning, Nancy learns that Sarah has been murdered. After inciting the suspicions of the police, Nancy comes to the conclusion that any of Sarah's four previous romantic interests could have performed the murder, and sets out to find which it could be.

== Reception ==
The Saturday Review published a review of the book on 20 December 1958, writing 'action unfrantic, dialogue abundant but sprightly'. The novel won the Gold Dagger Award in 1958.

== Republication ==
The novel was reissued in 2002, having been out of print for some years prior to this, but is no longer produced.
