= Co-production (media) =

Film and video terminology

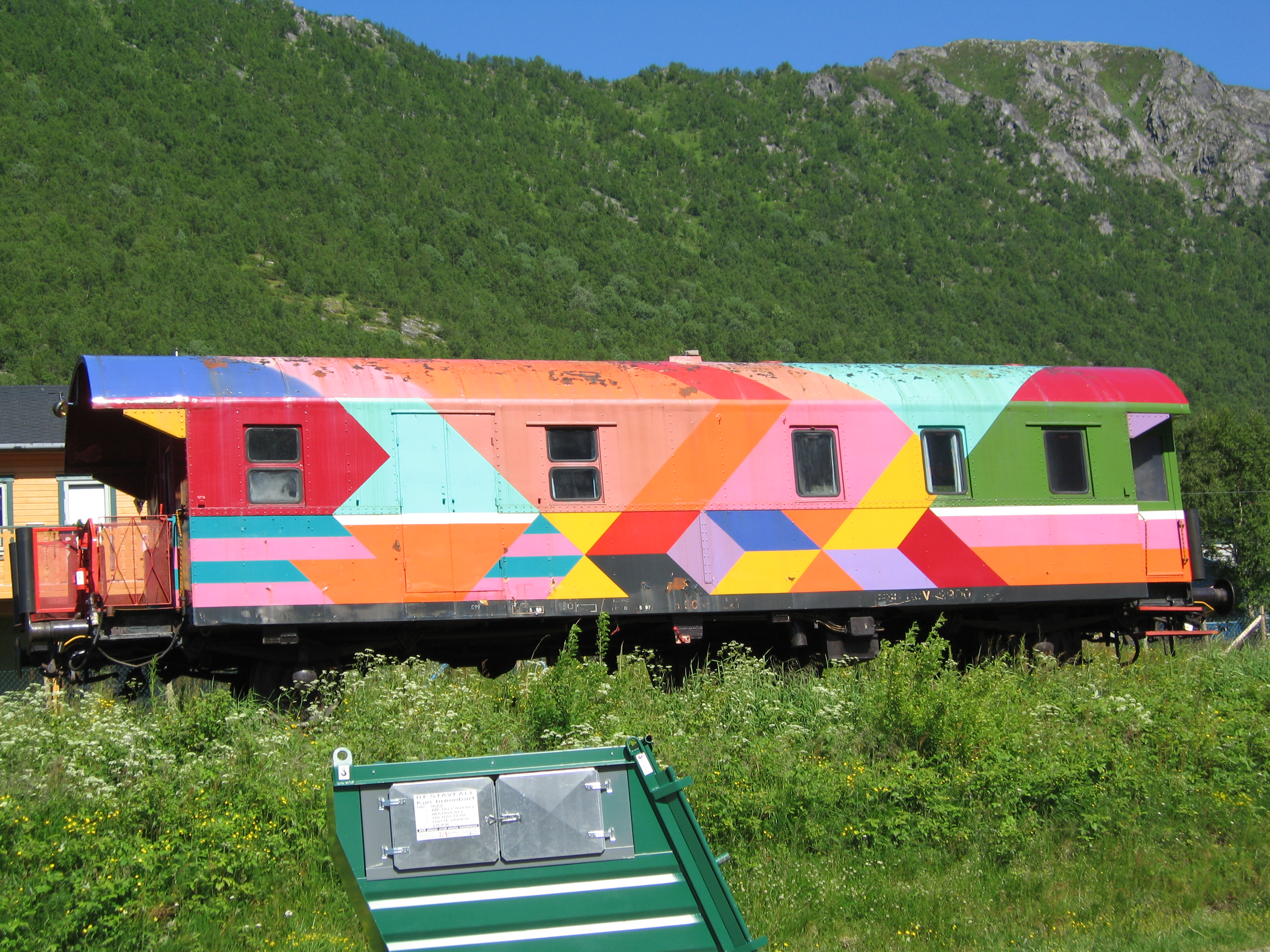
A train car used in the production of Sesam Stasjon, an international co-production of Sesame Street based in Norway.

A co-production is a joint venture between two or more different production companies for the purpose of film production, television production, video game development, and so on. In the case of an international co-production, production companies from different countries (typically two to three) are working together.

Co-production also refers to the way services are produced by their users, in some parts or entirely.

== History and benefits ==
The journalist Mark Lawson identifies the first use of the term, in the context of radio production, in 1941, although the programme to which he refers, Children Calling Home, "Presented in collaboration between the CBC of Canada, NBC of the U.S.A., and the BBC, and broadcast simultaneously in all three countries", was first broadcast in December 1940.

Following the Second World War, American film companies were forbidden by the Marshall Plan to take their film profits in the form of foreign exchange out of European countries. As a result, several film companies started studios and production companies in nations such as the United Kingdom and Italy to use their "frozen funds".

To use these profits in England, film companies would set up production companies using the required amount of British film technicians and actors to qualify as British Productions in order to take advantage of the Eady Levy.

At the same time, American citizens working outside the country for 510 days during a period of 18 months would not be taxed on their earnings by the Internal Revenue Service. Though this scheme was developed for the aid of American humanitarian workers redeveloping nations destroyed in World War II, agents discovered that Hollywood actors, directors, and screenwriters would qualify for the tax break by working outside the United States for the same period.

International film co-production was very common in the 50s, 60s and 70s between Italian, West German, Spanish and French production companies, as exemplified by most of the Spaghetti-western and sword and sandal movies being Spanish-Italian co-productions, typically directed by an Italian, played fifty-fifty by Spanish and Italian actors and shot in southern Spain landscapes. Due to the worldwide popularity of Hollywood stars, they would be used to guarantee a respectable audience around the world as well as the United States. The relatively low production costs and high box office return of these films often led to direct Hollywood investment to the non-American studios and producers such as Dino DeLaurentis. An example of such pan-European co-productions was Treasure Island (1972), a British-French-German-Italian-Spanish film, starring American filmmaker Orson Welles.

To qualify as an Italian film a film needed either an Italian director or cameraman plus at least two Italian featured players and an Italian film laboratory to process the film. Actor and director Mel Welles recalled that in the 1960s and 1970s the government of Spain would give producers funds based on the budget of the film whilst Italy would give producers funds based on the box office results of the film, however the government could interfere with production if they chose to.

The first European nations to sign a film co-production agreement were France and Italy in 1949. Between 1949 and 1964, 711 films were co-produced between the two nations.

Due to the expense of filmmaking, many films made outside the United States are international co-productions. For example, Amélie is set in France and stars French actors, but many scenes were shot in a German film studio and the post-production work was undertaken by a German film company. International co-productions open new markets for films and television programs and can increase the output of high quality productions through the sharing of equity investment.

Official co-productions are made possible by agreements between countries. Co-production agreements seek to achieve economic, cultural and diplomatic goals. For filmmakers, the key attraction of a treaty co-production is that it qualifies as a national production in each of the partner nations and can access benefits that are available to the local film and television industry in each country. Benefits may include government financial assistance, tax concessions and inclusion in domestic television broadcast quotas. International co-productions also occur outside the framework of official co-productions, for example with countries that do not have an agreement in place, or projects that do not satisfy official co-production criteria.

Dialogue director Mickey Knox recalled that in order to bring in American dollars and British pounds many countries behind the former Iron Curtain offered producers lucrative deals. In exchange for a share of the profits or an outright payment the host country would pick up most of the local charges; with the film often credited as a co-production.

In many cases, co-productions are a response to the challenges of internationalisation by countries with small production sectors, as they seek to maintain a viable production industry and produce culturally-specific content for national audiences. However, these dual goals also produce tensions within national film and television sectors. Although a co-production agreement may make available more resources, an international production risks being less relevant to its target audiences than purely local productions.

== Classifications ==
Renaud and Litman developed the terms "co-production strategy" and "international co-production." The first is based on the American experience in the late 1970s and early 1980s where its film companies had minimized foreign input while preferring in-house production or coproducing films with domestic companies. Here, the term "international co-production" is used to highlight the fact that these American companies have worked with foreign companies as a way to address specific needs.

Baltruschat introduces the concepts, "official" and "non-official" co-productions which can be distinguished by whether or not there is a formal inter-government agreement.

== Benefits of international co-production ==
As a response to internationalisation, co-production offers both benefits and drawbacks. A 1996 survey of Canadian international and domestic joint ventures identified the benefits as:

- the ability to pool financial resources;
- access to the partner government's incentives and subsidies;
- access to the partner's market, or to a third market;
- access to a particular project initiated by the partner;
- access to a desired location; or to cheaper inputs;
- cultural benefits; and
- the opportunity to learn from the partner.

== Costs of international co-production ==
Debate concerning international co-productions centres on the potential for productions to have little cultural specificity in any of its home countries. Internationalisation brings tensions in terms of cost, benefit and opportunity. In Australia, for example, O'Regan and Ward have argued that an influx of international productions to Queensland's Gold Coast in the 1990s presented a distinct challenge to local producers. In the face of such challenges, local producers need to learn "how to internationalise local film and television production in order to retain and hopefully build market shares; and how to develop new models of financing that combine both local and foreign sources." One approach has been to reconcile this tension by creating "local production with an explicit international orientation." But not everyone agrees this is the best approach. For example, the idea that Australia should produce more 'deterritorialised' programming such as fantasy and science fiction has been met with disquiet in some sections of the industry.

In Australia, some have suggested that a narrow definition of 'local content' has restricted Australia's ability to engage with international partners. Julia Hammett-Jamart reflects on the different approaches taken by France and Australia to this issue and argues that a literal-minded definition of Australian culture has been 'antagonistic to the collaborative nature of film production, and in particular international co-production'.

The Canadian study found evidence that, for television projects, domestic joint ventures performed better than international joint ventures. However, in the case of larger budget projects, domestic joint ventures were found not to be a viable alternative to international joint ventures. In their later study of co-production in Australia, the authors identified financial pooling as the most important benefit and increased co-ordination costs as the greatest drawback. This suggests that co-production is more suited to larger budget productions, primarily film, which have greater capital needs but do not carry the same dollar-for-dollar coordination costs as smaller projects.

Government bodies are keenly aware of these concerns. A review of Australian co-production rules acknowledged the tensions between cultural and economic objectives, and argues that 'requiring the program's aims to be predominantly economic or cultural would hobble the program and reduce its effectiveness in achieving either outcome'.
