= Children Calling Home =

- Country of origin: United Kingdom; Canada; United States; Australia; New Zealand; South Africa
- Home station: BBC Home Service; Canadian Broadcasting Corporation; NBC; Australian Broadcasting Commission; New Zealand Broadcasting Service; South African Broadcasting Corporation
- Original release: 25 December 1940 – 24 May 1944

Children Calling Home was an English-language radio programme, with the first episode on Christmas Day, 25 December 1940 as a collaboration between the United Kingdom's BBC's Home Service, CBC of Canada, and NBC of the United States, and broadcast simultaneously in all three countries. The following day, an episode made by the BBC in collaboration with the Australian Broadcasting Commission, the New Zealand Broadcasting Service and the South African Broadcasting Corporation, was broadcast simultaneously in all four of their countries. The presenter for the BBC was Roy Rich; their producer was Enid Maxwell.

The programme allowed children evacuated to the host countries from the UK, due to bombing during World War II, to talk with their parents.

The series continued, with various permutations of the involved networks, until at least 31 May 1944.

The journalist Mark Lawson identifies it as the first example of co-production.
