= Full Circle (Melville play) =

Full Circle (previously Dear Charles) is a play by Alan Melville adapted from "Les Enfants d'Edouard" by Marc-Gilbert Sauvajon and Frederick J. Jackson. It also was produced in 1944 with the title Slightly Scandalous, lasting only one week.

The plot focuses on Parisian author Dolores who "decides it is time to legitimize her three grown children so she invites their three fathers to a reunion party to decide which one she ought to marry."

Yvonne Arnaud and Tallulah Bankhead appeared in productions of Dear Charles in 1950s. In 2004 Joan Collins toured the UK with a revival of this play directed by Patrick Garland.

Sophie Stewart starred in a version of the play that was performed in Melbourne, Australia, in 1954 and went on to tour in Australia and New Zealand in 1955.
