= Gay's the Word (musical) =

- Original West End poster
- Music: Ivor Novello
- Lyrics: Alan Melville
- Book: Ivor Novello
- Productions: 1951 West End

Gay's the Word is a musical with book and music by Ivor Novello and lyrics by Alan Melville. The musical is a backstage comedy that parodies Novello's own swashbuckling Ruritanian romance plots. The story centres on Gay Daventry, a bankrupt operetta producer who opens a drama school at her country house. This also turns out to be unsuccessful, but it leads to a theatrical comeback for Gay.

The musical premiered at the Palace Theatre, Manchester, England, on 17 October 1950. It transferred to the Saville Theatre in London, opening there on 16 February 1951, where it ran for 504 performances and starred Cicely Courtneidge as Gay, Lizbeth Webb as Linda, and Thorley Walters. While it embraced the new style of musical theatre from America, it also contained traditional British humour for Courtneidge and glamorous soprano solos for Webb. The British Theatre Guide concludes: "The musical was never that good and without [Courtneidge] it would most certainly have failed. But with her, thanks to her indefatigable vitality, the show was a hit." This was Ivor Novello's last musical, and he died a month after it opened, aged 58.

The musical was revived in 2012 at the Finborough Theatre, London, with a book revised by Richard Stirling, directed and choreographed by Stewart Nicholls.

== Synopsis ==
Act 1

Gay Daventry, a producer and stage star, goes bankrupt when her new London operetta, similar to a Ruritanian Ivor Novello musical, is a disappointing failure. She agrees with the show's ingénue, Linda, to open a drama school with Linda's money at Gay's country house in Folkestone. She teaches her students that "vitality" is the secret to success. Meanwhile, two smugglers hope to use the school as a front for their illegal activities.

Act 2

At the Town Hall, the end-of-term show is to be performed, and Gay must go on stage as a Greek dancer, because the dance teacher of the school has resigned. The school is failing financially, and Gay disguises herself as an auctioneer, to sell off the contents of her basement; and one of the items up for bid is a trunk that turns out to conceal the smugglers' goods. Finally Gay, Linda and her boyfriend return to the professional stage with their students in a hit show.

== Musical numbers ==
- Ruritania
- Guards of the Parade
- Bees are Buzzin'
- An Englishman in Love
- Everything Reminds Me of You
- Father Thames
- Finder, Please Return
- Gaiety Glad
- If Only He'd Looked My Way
- It's Bound To Be Right On the Night
- Matter of Minutes
- On Such A Night As This
- Vitality
- Sweet Thames
