= The Snow Goose (novella) =

Novella by Paul Gallico

The Snow Goose: A Story of Dunkirk
- First edition (publ. Knopf); Cover artist: George Salter
- Author: Paul Gallico
- Language: English
- Publication date: 1941

The Snow Goose: A Story of Dunkirk is a novella by the American author Paul Gallico. It was first published in 1940 as a short story in The Saturday Evening Post, after which he expanded it to create a short novella which was published on 7 April 1941.

== Plot summary ==
The Snow Goose is a simple, short written parable on the regenerative power of friendship and love, set against a backdrop of the horror of war. It documents the growth of a friendship between Philip Rhayader, an artist living a solitary life in an abandoned lighthouse in the marshlands of Essex because of his disabilities, and a young local girl, Fritha.

The snow goose, symbolic of both Rhayader (Gallico) and the world itself, wounded by gunshot and many miles from home, is found by Fritha and, as the human friendship blossoms, the bird is nursed back to flight, and revisits the lighthouse in its migration for several years. As Fritha grows up, Rhayader and his small sailboat eventually are lost in the Dunkirk evacuation, having saved several hundred men. The bird, which was with Rhayader, returns briefly to the grown Fritha on the marshes. She interprets this as Rhayader's soul taking farewell of her (and realizes she had come to love him). Afterwards, a German pilot destroys Rhayader's lighthouse and all of his work, except for one portrait Fritha saved after his death: a painting of her as Rhayader first saw her – a child, with the injured snow goose in her arms.

== Reception ==
The Snow Goose was one of the O. Henry Prize Winners in 1941.

Critic Robert van Gelder called it "perhaps the most sentimental story that ever has achieved the dignity of a Borzoi imprint [logo of publisher Alfred A. Knopf]. It is a timeless legend that makes use of every timeless appeal that could be crowded into it." A public library put it on a list of "tearjerkers". Gallico made no apologies, saying that in the contest between sentiment and "slime", "sentiment remains so far out in front, as it always has and always will among ordinary humans that the calamity-howlers and porn merchants have to increase the decibels of their lamentations, the hideousness of their violence and the mountainous piles of their filth to keep in the race at all."

== Popular culture ==
- In 1944, Ronald Colman read The Snow Goose on Silver Theater on CBS radio (April 30, 1944).
- In 1948, a spoken word recording featuring Herbert Marshall, with music by Victor Young was issued on Decca records.
- In 1971, The Snow Goose, directed by Patrick Garland, was broadcast on BBC television. This film, from a screenplay by Gallico, features Richard Harris and Jenny Agutter. It won a Golden Globe for Best Movie Made for TV, and was nominated for both a BAFTA and an Emmy, with Agutter winning for Outstanding Supporting Actress, and was shown in the US as part of the Hallmark Hall of Fame.
- In 1976, Spike Milligan narrated an edited version, with music by Ed Welch, issued on RCA records.
- In 1990, Ruth Cracknell narrated an edited version, with music again by Welch, issued by EMI and ABC Records; this was nominated for the ARIA Award for Best Children's Album in 1992.
- In 2002, William Fiennes published The Snow Geese – a travel book about the snow goose and its migrations. The author was inspired by reading The Snow Goose as a child.
- In 2003, John Harvey and The Puppet Lab in Edinburgh, toured the UK with a puppet-adaptation of the book.
- In 2014, an excerpt from The Snow Goose was set as a comprehension passage in the Annual ISC Examinations conducted by CISCE.
- In 2016, author Michael Morpurgo acknowledged its influence on his much-loved War Horse in the foreword to the Wildfowl & Wetlands Trust's 70th anniversary republication of the 1946 edition, featuring illustrations by Peter Scott.

=== Musical adaptations ===
In 1975, the British progressive rock group Camel made an orchestrated instrumental album based on Gallico's novel, initially titled The Snow Goose. Gallico threatened to sue the band for copyright infringement, and therefore the band had to change the title to Music Inspired by The Snow Goose. The album was a great success and established Camel as a successful group, leading to a sell-out performance with the London Symphony Orchestra at the Royal Albert Hall, London, in October 1975, which was later released as part of their first concert album A Live Record. Camel toured Europe in late 2013 and early 2014, performing the album in its entirety for the first time since 1975. In 2014, readers of Prog magazine voted it no. 31 in the Top 100 Prog Albums of All Time.

In 1976, RCA released an album called The Snow Goose with music written and orchestrated by Ed Welch and Spike Milligan. Contributions were made by Harry Edgington and Alan Clare. The album was produced by Welch and Stuart Taylor for Quarry Productions Ltd, with artistic direction from Milligan. Gallico's original story was adapted for this recording by Milligan in Australia in 1976. The music is published by Clowns Music Ltd. Milligan provided the narration throughout. Virginia, the widow of Paul Gallico, co-operated on the project.

John Ritchie composed "The Snow Goose" for flute and orchestra in 1982. In 1999 a version for flute and piano was created.

In 2026, Goodspeed Musicals will premiere a musical adaptation at the Goodspeed Opera House written by Scott Gilmour & Claire McKenzie after presenting a reading in the prestigious Festival of New Musicals in 2024.

== Allusions and references to real things ==
- Philip Rhayader was loosely inspired by the British ornithologist, conservationist and painter Peter Scott, whose life at the East Bank Lighthouse on the River Nene also helped inspire the setting of The Snow Goose. Scott later illustrated the first English edition of the book, using his then-wife Elizabeth Jane Howard as the model for Fritha.
- Rhayader is a town in Wales, and also the Welsh word for waterfall.

== See also ==
- Little Ships of Dunkirk

== Sources ==
- "The Snow Goose", information at PaulGallico.info
- The Snow Goose on Theatre Royal: April 18, 1954
