= Castle in the Air (play) =

1949 play

- Written by: Alan Melville
- Original language: English
- Genre: Comedy
- Setting: Locharne Castle, Aberdeenshire

Premiere
- Date premiered: 20 September 1949
- Place premiered: Coventry Hippodrome, Coventry

Castle in the Air is a comedy play by the British writer Alan Melville, which was originally performed in 1949.

It premiered at the Coventry Hippodrome on 20 September 1949 before transferring to London's West End where it ran for 292 performances between 7 December 1949 and 17 August 1950, initially at the Adelphi Theatre before moving to the Savoy. The original London cast featured Jack Buchanan, William Kendall, Ewan Roberts, Coral Browne and Irene Manning. It was directed by Roy Rich.

In 1952 it was adapted into a British film of the same title directed by Henry Cass and starring David Tomlinson, Helen Cherry and Margaret Rutherford.

== Bibliography ==
- Goble, Alan. The Complete Index to Literary Sources in Film. Walter de Gruyter, 1999.
- Wearing, J.P. The London Stage 1940-1949: A Calendar of Productions, Performers, and Personnel. Rowman & Littlefield, 2014.
