= The Snow Goose (film) =

- Based on: The Snow Goose: A Story of Dunkirk by Paul Gallico
- Written by: Paul Gallico
- Directed by: Patrick Garland
- Starring: Richard Harris; Jenny Agutter
- Music by: Carl Davis
- Country of origin: United Kingdom
- Original language: English

Production
- Producer: Innes Lloyd
- Running time: 50 mins
- Production companies: Universal Television; BBC

Original release
- Network: BBC
- Release: 15 November 1971

The Snow Goose is a 1971 British television drama film based on the 1941 novella The Snow Goose: A Story of Dunkirk by Paul Gallico.

It won a Golden Globe Award for Best Television Film and was nominated for a British Academy Television Award for Best Drama Production. It was also nominated for a nine Primetime Emmy Awards, winning one for Jenny Agutter for Outstanding Performance by an Actress in a Supporting Role in a Drama. The film was shown in the United States on 15 November 1971 as part of the anthology series Hallmark Hall of Fame.

== Plot ==
The film follows the relationship between Fritha (Jenny Agutter), an orphaned young girl, and Philip Rhayader (Richard Harris), a lighthouse keeper in the fishing village Great Marsh in Essex. The two meet as Rhayader helps Fritha care for a snow goose she has found, despite his solitary lifestyle. The bird has been injured by hunters shooting at it.

Set at the beginning of World War II, the film uses the backdrop of the ongoing political events and battles throughout the narrative. As the goose heals, Fritha and the goose leave Rhayader. Rhayader once again becomes reclusive and confines himself to his lighthouse lodging.

As Germany invades Poland and the war begins, Rhayader applies to the Observer Corps, but is denied due to his disabilities. Fritha and the goose eventually return to Rhayader, but Rhayader ventures out to help rescue the British Expeditionary Force, trapped on the beaches of Dunkirk. He is killed during the Dunkirk evacuation, and the goose returns to Fritha, who is now grown up. She realises she had come to love Rhayader and is able to save one of the paintings he had made of her, as a child with the wounded goose, before the lighthouse and all other artwork are obliterated by a German airstrike.

== Cast ==
- Richard Harris as Philip Rhayader
- Jenny Agutter as Fritha
- Graham Crowden as the recruiting officer
- Julian Somers as Jim
- Freda Bamford as the postmistress
- Noel Johnson as the naval captain
- Gary Watson as the narrator
- William Marlowe as a soldier

== Awards and nominations ==
| Award | Category | Nominee(s) | Result | Ref. |
|---|---|---|---|---|
| British Academy Television Awards | Best Drama Production | Patrick Garland | Nominated | |
| Golden Globe Awards | Best Television Film | | Won | |
| Primetime Emmy Awards | Outstanding Single Program – Drama or Comedy | Frank O'Connor | Nominated | |
| Primetime Emmy Awards | Outstanding Single Performance by an Actor in a Leading Role | Richard Harris | Nominated | |
| Primetime Emmy Awards | Outstanding Performance by an Actress in a Supporting Role in a Drama | Jenny Agutter | Won | |
| Primetime Emmy Awards | Outstanding Directorial Achievement in Drama – A Single Program | Patrick Garland | Nominated | |
| Primetime Emmy Awards | Outstanding Writing Achievement in Drama – Adaptation | Paul Gallico | Nominated | |
| Primetime Emmy Awards | Outstanding Achievement in Art Direction or Scenic Design – For a Dramatic Program or Feature Length Film Made for Television, a Single Program of a Series or a Special Program | Stanley Morris | Nominated | |
| Primetime Emmy Awards | Outstanding Achievement in Cinematography for Entertainment Programming – For a Special or Feature Length Program Made for Television | Ray Henman | Nominated | |
| Primetime Emmy Awards | Outstanding Achievement in Film Editing for Entertainment Programming – For a Special or Feature Length Program Made for Television | Ken Pearce | Nominated | |
| Primetime Emmy Awards | Outstanding Achievement in Music Composition – For a Special Program | Carl Davis | Nominated | |
