= Top Secret (novel) =

- First edition
- Author: W.E.B. Griffin and William E. Butterworth IV
- Language: English
- Genre: Spy novel
- Publisher: G. P. Putnam's Sons
- Publication date: August 5, 2014
- Publication place: United States
- Media type: Print (hardcover)
- Pages: 528 pp (first edition, hardcover)
- ISBN: 0399171231
- Followed by: The Assassination Option

Top Secret is to be the first novel in the Clandestine Operations series by W.E.B. Griffin and William E. Butterworth IV.

== Plot ==
This novel centers around a new officer, James Cronley, who at the very end of World War II is recruited for a new intelligence operation and is sent to Germany. Cronley suffers a personal tragedy just before being sent to his new post. It is hoped Cronley can become a great asset to the new organization, which is to become the Central Intelligence Agency. Cronley is put in charge of an operation that includes former German officers and he quickly finds himself in charge of a captured Soviet spy. Many of the characters from Argentina in the Honor Bound series make appearances throughout the novel.

Cronley gets himself into some situations that will seemingly end his career, but with some guidance from those who are more experienced, he seems to have a chance to redeem himself. He has to convince the Soviet spy to turn against his Soviet masters and it is apparent other spies for the Soviets are working right under Cronley's nose to defeat him. This book does not reveal whether Cronley will succeed or fail completely. The next book in the series picks up the story.

== Reviews ==
Kirkus Reviews liked this book, saying Griffin "fans will not be disappointed." Book Reporter, as well, liked this book, saying, "TOP SECRET is a big book but an easy read, and pages cry out to be turned for the next thrilling chapter."

Publishers Weekly basically said this book will not please everyone, "Those readers expecting action will be disappointed as a host of characters make plans, read secret memos, and engage in interior monologues. Those who are happy with lots of interesting period history, dry humor, and clever scheming will be amply rewarded."
