= The Widow of Bath (novel) =

1952 novel

- First edition (UK)
- Author: Margot Bennett
- Language: English
- Genre: Crime
- Published: 1952
- Publisher: Eyre & Spottiswoode (UK); Doubleday (US)
- Publication place: United Kingdom
- Media type: Print
- Pages: 223
- ISBN: 0 7540 8592 9

The Widow of Bath is a crime thriller novel published in 1952 by the Scottish author Margot Bennett.

== Premise ==
The book is about Hugh Everton, who is struggling to readjust to normal life after serving several months in prison. He re-encounters his ex-lover, Lucy, who is married to Judge Bath. Against his better judgment, Hugh agrees to spend some time at the couple's house, but before long, the judge is killed and his body vanishes.

== TV Serial ==
The book was adapted into a six-episode serial by the BBC in 1959, which was directed by Gerard Glaister, with the screenplay written by Bennett. It starred John Justin as Hugh Everton and Barbara Murray as Lucy. The series no longer survives in the BBC archives.

== Availability ==
The novel is out of print, with its last edition dating back to 2001. Since September 2021, it is available for purchase as an e-book on Amazon UK.
