= Barbara Murray =

British screen actress (1929–2014)

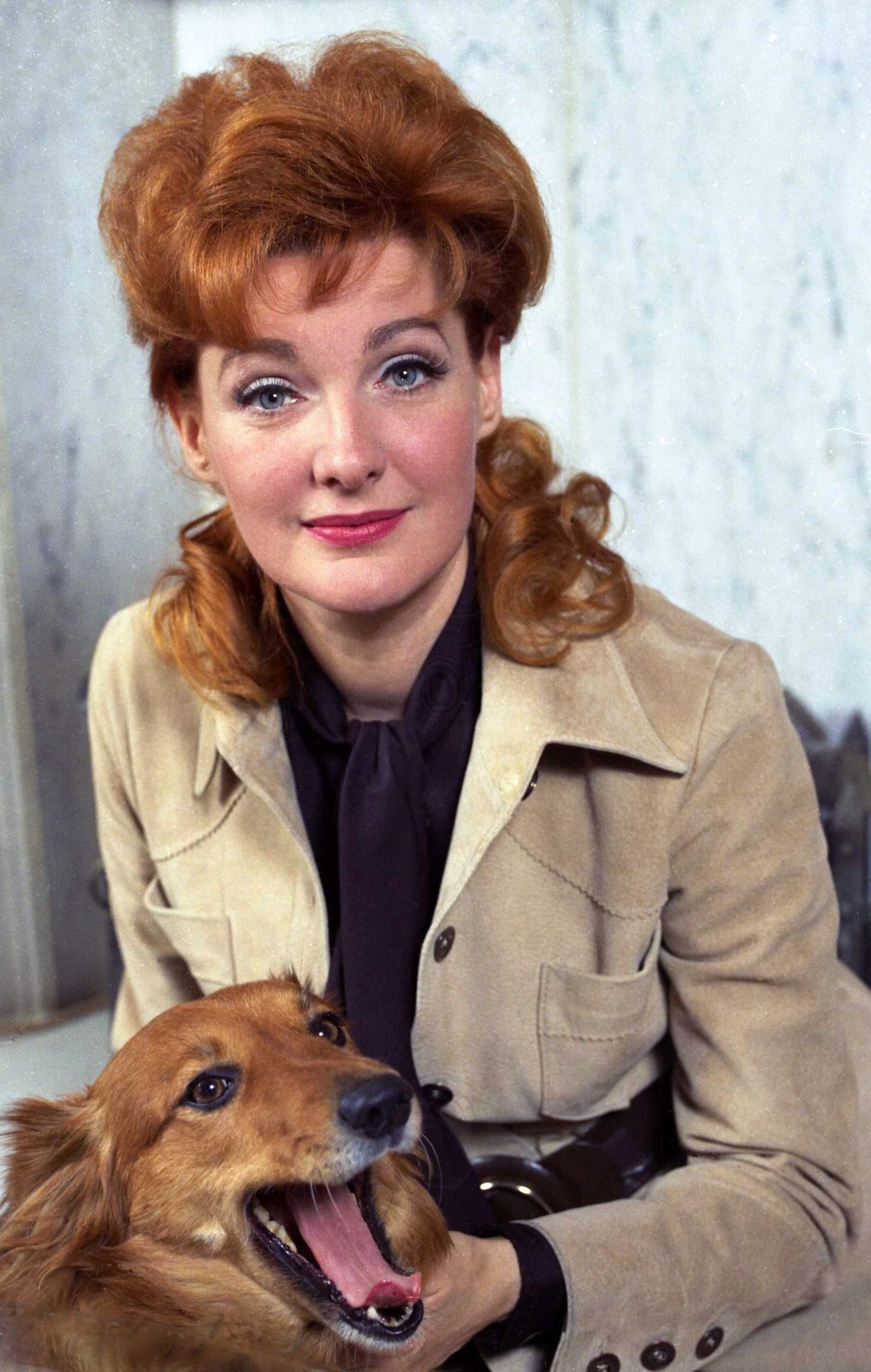
- Photographed by Allan Warren in 1973
- Born: 27 September 1929; London, England
- Died: 20 May 2014 (aged 84); Alicante, Spain
- Years active: 1948–1999
- Spouse(s): John Justin (m. 1952; div. 1964) Bill "Peter" Holmes (m. 1964; div. ??)
- Children: 3

Barbara Ann Murray (27 September 1929 – 20 May 2014) was an English actress.

Murray was most active in the 1940s and 1950s as a fresh-faced leading lady in many British films such as Passport to Pimlico (1949), Meet Mr. Lucifer (1953) and Doctor in the House (1954). She continued with film work into the 1960s (including a role in the Tony Hancock film The Punch and Judy Man) but appeared more frequently on television. She played Mrs Hauksbee in 7 episodes of the TV dramatisations of Rudyard Kipling's Plain Tales from the Hills, from 1964. She is possibly best known for her role as Lady Pamela Wilder in the 1960s drama series The Plane Makers (and the sequel, The Power Game).

Her other TV credits include: The Escape of R.D.7, Danger Man, Never a Cross Word, The Saint, Department S, Strange Report, His and Hers, The Widow of Bath, The Pallisers, based on Anthony Trollope's series of novels (in which she played a major role as Madame Max Goesler, a wealthy foreign widow), The Mackinnons, Doctor Who, Albert and Victoria, Robin's Nest 1978 and The Bretts.

In 1976, she spent six weeks in hospital after breaking her jaw, when a car in which she was travelling was involved in a collision, during a British Council-sponsored acting tour of Brazil: "Fortunately, I was lucky and there were no marks on my face," she reflected.

Murray had three daughters from her marriage to the actor John Justin, but after twelve years of marriage, the couple divorced in 1964. That same year, Murray married Bill "Peter" Holmes, an English literature teacher and former film actor (using the "Peter" first name); this marriage also ended in divorce.

== Selected filmography ==
- Anna Karenina (1948) – Undetermined Role (uncredited)
- Saraband for Dead Lovers (1948) – (uncredited)
- To the Public Danger (1948)
- Badger's Green (1949) – Jane Morton
- Passport to Pimlico (1949) – Shirley Pemberton
- A Boy, a Girl and a Bike (1949) – Minor Role (uncredited)
- Poet's Pub (1949) – Nelly Bly
- Don't Ever Leave Me (1949) – Joan Robbins
- Boys in Brown (1949) – Kitty Hurst
- Tony Draws a Horse (1950) – Joan Parsons
- The Dark Man (1951) – Carol Burns
- Mystery Junction (1951) – Pat Dawn
- Another Man's Poison (1951) – Chris Dale
- The Frightened Man (1952) – Amanda
- Hot Ice (1952) – Mary
- Street Corner (1953) – WPC Lucy Loggart
- Death Goes to School (1953) – Miss Shepherd
- Meet Mr Lucifer (1953) – Patricia
- The Teckman Mystery (1954) – Kitty
- Doctor at Large (1957) – Kitty
- Campbell's Kingdom (1957) – Jean Lucas
- A Cry from the Streets (1958) – Ann Fairlie
- Operation Bullshine (1959) – Pvt. Betty Brown
- The Punch and Judy Man (1963) – Lady Jane Caterham
- Doctor in Distress (1963) – Iris Marchant – Physiotherapist
- A Hard Day's Night (1964) – Picture in Paul's Daily Express (uncredited)
- A Dandy in Aspic (1968) – Miss Vogler
- Some Will, Some Won't (1970) – Lucille
- Up Pompeii (1971) – Ammonia
- Tales From the Crypt (1972) – Enid Jason (segment 4 "Wish You Were Here")
- The Curse of King Tut's Tomb (1980) – Giovanna Antoniella
- The Power (1984) – Tommy's Mother
- The Harpist (1999) – Mrs. Budde (final film role)
