= John Justin =

British actor (1917–2002)

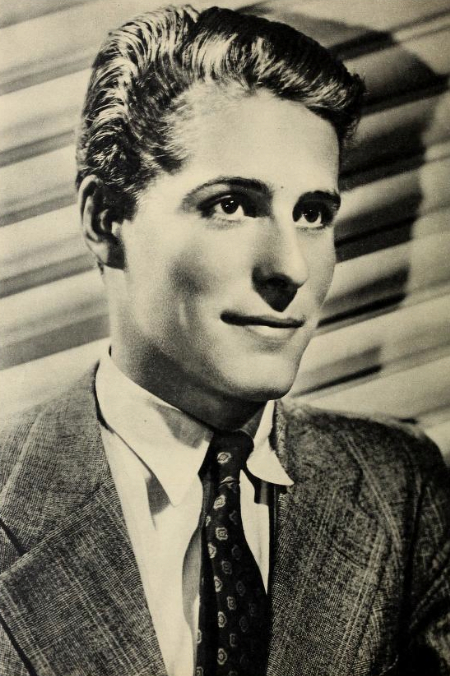
- Justin in 1940
- Born: John Justinian de Ledesma; 24 November 1917; Knightsbridge, London, England
- Died: 29 November 2002 (aged 85); Petersfield, Hampshire, England
- Occupation: Actor
- Years active: 1937–1983
- Spouses: Pola Nirenska (m. 1946; div. 1949) Barbara Murray (m. 1952; div. 1964) Alison McMurdo (m. 1979)
- Children: 3

John Justin (24 November 1917 – 29 November 2002) was an English stage and film actor.

== Early life ==
John Justinian de Ledesma was born in the Knightsbridge district of London, the son of a well-off Argentine rancher. Though he grew up on his father's estancia, he was educated at Bryanston School in Bryanston. He developed an interest in flying and became a qualified pilot at the age of 12, though he was not allowed to fly solo at the time because of his age.

== Acting career ==
Justin became interested in acting at a young age. By the age of 16, he had joined the Plymouth Repertory. In 1937, he briefly trained with the Royal Academy of Dramatic Art, but did not like it and soon joined the repertory company of John Gielgud. Among the plays he appeared in was Dear Octopus.

=== The Thief of Bagdad ===
In 1938, he auditioned for and was cast in the role for which he is perhaps best remembered, Ahmad in the 1940 version of The Thief of Bagdad, opposite Sabu. To do so, he had to sign a seven-year contract with Alexander Korda.

=== Second World War ===
The Second World War broke out during the film's production. After completing the picture, Justin joined the Royal Air Force, serving as a test pilot and flying instructor. He was injured in a crash.

He was given leave in 1943 to work on The Gentle Sex, a film in praise of Auxiliary Territorial Service, directed and narrated by Leslie Howard, and in 1944 for Journey Together, a film focusing on RAF aircrew cadets, with a cast led by Richard Attenborough, Jack Watling and David Tomlinson. Edward G. Robinson and Bessie Love, whose career began in the silent era, also appeared in the cast.

=== Post-war ===
With the war's end, Justin returned to acting. In 1948, he did a stint at the Shakespeare Memorial Theatre, Stratford-on-Avon, appearing in King John, The Merchant of Venice, The Winter's Tale, Othello, Hamlet, and Troilus and Cressida. He also made the 1948 film Call of the Blood.

In 1949, he appeared on stage in Peter Pan and was in Antigone on the BBC. Justin was in Return to Tyassi (1950) on the West End and appeared in The Angel with the Trumpet (1950).

Justin appeared in the 1952 films The Sound Barrier and Hot Ice in which he played the lead. After appearing in Uncle Vanya (1952) on stage, he focused on film work.

He was in two 1953 films, The Village, produced in Switzerland and the biopic Melba; King of the Khyber Rifles (1954), a Hollywood film with Tyrone Power for 20th Century Fox; Seagulls Over Sorrento (1954) with Gene Kelly. He then had two leading roles, in The Teckman Mystery (1954) with Margaret Leighton and The Man Who Loved Redheads (1955) with Moira Shearer.

Fox called him back for Untamed (1955) and Warwick Films used him in Safari (1956) with Victor Mature. Justin had a good role in Fox's Island in the Sun (1957), romancing Dorothy Dandridge.

In 1957, he appeared on stage in Dinner with the Family. In 1959 he joined the Old Vic, where his plays included The Double Dealer, As You Like It, and The Importance of Being Earnest.

He made his Broadway debut in 1960 in the play Little Moon of Alban and was in The Spider's Web (1960). He was later in stage productions of Much Ado About Nothing (1963), Death of a Salesman (1965), and As You Like It (1965).

Between 1963 and 1970 he made no film appearances. In 1968 he played Thorin Oakenshield in the BBC Radio adaptation of The Hobbit.

=== Later career ===
On stage he was in Lulu (1971), toured South Africa in Who Killed Santa Claus? (1971), and appeared in Old Fruit (1974), and A Man And His Wife (1974).

His later films include Ken Russell's Savage Messiah (1972), Lisztomania (1975) and Valentino (1977).

In 1979, he played the ghoulish lover in A BBC Ghost Story for Christmas, Schalcken the Painter, based on Sheridan Le Fanu's 1839 tale Strange Event in the Life of Schalken the Painter.

His love was for the stage. He called his film career "a mistake".

== Personal life ==
Justin was married three times, first to dancer and choreographer Pola Nirenska. His second marriage, to actress Barbara Murray, lasted from 1952 to 1964; they had three daughters. From 1970 to his death in 2002, he was married to Alison McMurdo.

== Complete filmography ==
- The Thief of Bagdad (1940) - Ahmad
- The Gentle Sex (1943) - Flying Officer David Sheridan
- Journey Together (1945) - Flying Instructor, Flying Grading School
- No Alibi (1947, Short) - Pilot
- Ridgeway's Late Joys (1947, TV)
- Call of the Blood (1949) - David Erskine
- Antigone (1949, live TV drama) - Haemon
- The Angel with the Trumpet (1950) - Paul Alt
- The World of Light (1950, live TV drama) - Bill Hamblin
- Rush Job (1951, live TV drama) - Tom Stevenson
- The Sound Barrier (1952) - Philip Peel
- Hot Ice (1952) - Jim Henderson
- The Village (1953) - Alan Manning
- Melba (1953) - Eric Walton
- King of the Khyber Rifles (1953) - Lt. Geoffrey Heath
- Sacrifice to the Wind (1954, live TV drama) - Ulysses
- Seagulls Over Sorrento (1954) - Lt. Roger Wharton
- The Teckman Mystery (1954) - Philip Chance
- The Man Who Loved Redheads (1955) - Mark St. Neots, Lord Binfield
- Untamed (1955) - Shawn Kildare
- Guilty? (1956) - Nap Rumbold
- Safari (1956) - Brian Sinden
- Island in the Sun (1957) - Denis Archer
- The Widow of Bath (1959, TV series) - Hugh Everton
- The Spider's Web (1960) - Henry Hailsham-Brown
- Les hommes veulent vivre (Man Wants to Live) (1961) - Carter
- Candidate for Murder (1962) - Robert Vaughan
- La Salamandre d'or (1962) - Vandoeuvre
- Savage Messiah (1972) - Lionel Shaw
- La redada (Barcelona Kill) (1973) - Comisario Mendoza
- Lisztomania (1975) - Count d'Agoult
- Valentino (1977) - Sidney Olcott
- The Big Sleep (1978) - Arthur Geiger
- Schalcken the Painter (1979, TV Movie) - Vanderhausen
- Very Like a Whale (1980, TV Movie) - Party Guest
- Timon of Athens (1981, TV Movie) - Second Senator
- Lady Killers (1981) - Thomas Edward Scrutton
- Trenchcoat (1983) - Marquis De Pena
- Good at Art (1983, TV Movie) - Mr. Jones (final film role)
- Sabu: The Elephant Boy (1993, documentary) - Himself
