= Alan Melville (writer) =

English broadcaster, writer, actor, producer (1910–1983)

- Born: William Melville Caverhill; 9 April 1910; Berwick-Upon-Tweed, Northumberland, England
- Died: 24 December 1983 (age 73); Brighton, East Sussex, England
- Occupations: Broadcaster; writer; actor; producer; playwright; raconteur

Alan Melville (9 April 1910 – 24 December 1983) was an English broadcaster, writer, actor, raconteur, producer, playwright and wit.

== Biography ==
Born William Melville Caverhill in Berwick-upon-Tweed, Northumberland, England, he was educated in his home town and then a boarder at the Edinburgh Academy. Leaving school at 17, he started work in the family timber merchants as an apprentice joiner. At the age of 22, he entered an essay competition in John O'Leary's Weekly with an essay entitled My Perfect Holiday and won the first prize; a return trip to Canada (1934). Soon afterwards he sent the BBC North Region six short stories called The Adventures of the Pink Knight (1934), which were accepted and used on Children's Hour. He was required to read the stories himself, his first professional engagement. He continued to write from the timber yard, his short stories, poems, manuscripts sometimes being accepted by various publishers. He wrote his first novel, a whodunit called Weekend at Thrackley, which was accepted and published and later made into a film called Hot Ice.

Melville left the timber yard and struggled on his own for a while until he met a composer called George McNeill. Together they turned out number after number, Melville writing the lyrics. In 1936 the BBC offered him a job as a scriptwriter in the variety department in London under Eric Maschwitz at £250 per year. After a three-month training course, he was sent to the Aberdeen radio station as features and drama producer.

In the early part of World War II, he compiled daily instalments of the Robinson Family serial about an ordinary family in London on the BBC's North American Service. In 1941 he enlisted in the RAF where he reached the rank of Wing Commander. He worked as a war correspondent sending regular dispatches to the BBC. His experience enabled him to write First Tide. He was with the Allied Invasion force of 1944 and took part in the Normandy landings, sending back reports to the BBC; then onto Brussels and in Germany for the surrender. He was sent back to London on embarkation leave, after which he should have gone to the Far East but was kept for an RAF pageant in the Royal Albert Hall, which he scripted and Ralph Reader directed with 1,500 RAF personnel.

During the war years he wrote revues, Sweet and Low, Sweeter and Lower and Sweetest and Lowest, which ran in all for five years at the Ambassadors Theatre. After its success, he was signed up on a five-year contract for London Films by Alexander Korda. Melville's collaboration with composer Charles Zwar began when they wrote "Which Witch?" for Sky High in 1942; they continued to work together for some of the numbers in Sweeter and Lower and for all of Sweetest and Lowest.

After the war he wrote plays including Castle in the Air (1949; filmed in 1952), Full Circle (1952, previously Dear Charles and adapted from Les Enfants d'Edouard by Marc-Gilbert Sauvajon and Frederick J. Jackson), Simon and Laura 1954, which was later made into a film in 1955, and the book and lyrics for the musical Gay's the Word (1950, music by Ivor Novello). The musical premiered at the Palace Theatre, Manchester in 1950 and transferred to the Saville Theatre in London in 1951, where it ran for 504 performances and starred Cicely Courtneidge, Lizbeth Webb and Thorley Walters.

In 1951, Melville wrote the musical Bet Your Life, with music by Kenneth Leslie Smith and Charles Zwar and starring Arthur Askey and Julie Wilson. A few years later he wrote the musical Marigold based on the play by Francis R. Pryor and Lizzie Allen Harker; the score was composed by Charles Zwar and it starred Jean Kent, Sally Smith, Sophie Stewart and Jeremy Brett.

Alan Melville became one of Britain's first television stars. He became chairman of The Brains Trust and a panelist in What's My Line? He wrote and appeared in many television programmes, among them A to Z, which ran for two years (1957–58) and played host to more than 400 guests including Bob Hope, Phil Silvers, John Dankworth and Dame Edith Evans.

Merely Melville, one of his television programmes, he used as a title for his autobiography. He took the leading role from Ian Carmichael in the play Gazebo at the Savoy Theatre. Moira Lister was his co-star.

He moved to Brighton in 1951 and died at the age of 73 in December 1983 at the Royal Sussex County Hospital, Brighton, where he had been a patient since November. He was cremated in the Downs Crematorium, Brighton, on 12 January 1984.

== Works ==
=== Plays ===
- Castle in the Air
- Dear Charles
- Simon and Laura
- Jonathan
- Devil May Care
- Mrs. Willie
- Top Secret
- Change of Tune
- The Bargain (in America)
- Everything Happens on a Friday
- Top Priority
- Grande Dame
- Demandez Vicky (European production)
- Finder Bitte Melden (European production)
- Content to Whisper
- Here is the News (Paradise Island)

=== Fiction ===
- Weekend at Thrackley (London, Skeffington & Son, 1934, Re-published British Library Publishing Division, 2018, ISBN 978-0712352116)
- Quick Curtain (London, Skeffington & Son, 1934. Re-published British Library Publishing Division, 2015, ISBN 978-0712357890)
- The Vicar in Hell (London, Skeffington & Son, 1935)
- Eleven Twenty-Seven [as Neil Carruthers] (London, Rich & Cowan, 1935)
- Death of Anton (London, Skeffington & Son, 1936. Re-published British Library Crime Series, 2015, ISBN 978-0712357883)
- Warning to Critics: A Murder aka The Critic on the Hearth (London, Skeffington & Son, 1936)

=== Non-fiction ===
- Myself When Young (London, Max Parish, 1955, ASIN:B0000CJALP)
- First Tide (London, Skeffington & Son, 1944, ASIN:B00MJ94BJQ)
- Gnomes & Gardens (London, Heinemann/Quixote Press, 1983,ISBN 978-0434980413)

=== Revues and musicals ===
- Sky High, 1942
- Sweet and Low, 1943
- Sweeter and Lower, 1944
- Sweetest and Lowest, 1946
- Between Ourselves, 1946
- A la Carte, 1948
- Bet Your Life, 1952
- At the Lyric, 1953
- Going to Town, 1956
- All Square, 1963
- Gay's the Word (with Ivor Novello), 1950
- Marigold, 1959

=== TV series ===
- Melville Mixture, 1953
- The Brains Trust, 1955–57
- What's My Line? 1956-61
- A to Z, 1957–58
- Merely Melville, 1958
- Points of View, 1962
- Call My Bluff 1966
- Melvillainy, 1962
- Raise your Glasses, 1962
- The Whitehall Worrier, 1967
- The Very Merry Widow, 1967–69
- Misleading Cases, 1967–68
- Before the Fringe, 1967–68
- Brighton Belle, 1972

=== Bibliography ===
- Merely Melville, an autobiography (London, Hodder & Stoughton 1970, ISBN 978-0340125946)
