= 110th Aviation Brigade =

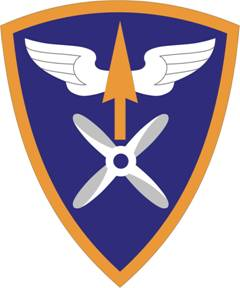
- 110th Aviation Brigade shoulder sleeve insignia: On an ultramarine blue shield 3 inches (7.62 cm) in height by 2 1/2 inches (6.35 cm) in width overall with a 1/8 inch (.32 cm) golden orange border, a golden orange spearhead surmounting a white vol in chief and issuing from a four-blade white propeller shaded gray, in base.
- Active: 2005 - Present
- Country: United States
- Branch: United States Army
- Type: Aviation Training Brigade
- Role: Aviation
- Size: Brigade
- Part of: United States Army Aviation Center of Excellence
- Garrison/HQ: Fort Rucker, Alabama
- Nickname: "Warriors"
- Motto: "WILL DO"
- Colors: Blue and Orange
- March: 1776 Overture

Commanders
- Commander: COL Dennis K. Hill
- Command Sergeant Major: CSM Nathan D. Mullins
- Command Chief Warrant Officer: CW5 Robert E. Macey

Insignia
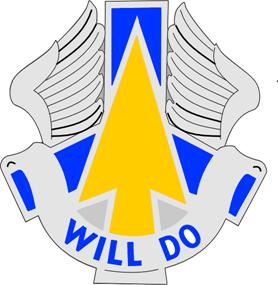
- Distinctive unit insignia
- Identification symbol: 110th Aviation Brigade distinctive unit insignia: A silver color metal and enamel device 1 3/16 inches (3.02 cm) in height overall consisting of a blue shakefork reversed, the three arms of equal length and couped, the vertical arm between two silver wings of five feathers each the tips of feathers inward and surmounted by a golden orange arrowhead, a silver scroll in base passing over the throat of the arrowhead and over and back of the ends of the two lower arms of the shakefork, and bearing the motto "WILL DO" in blue letters.
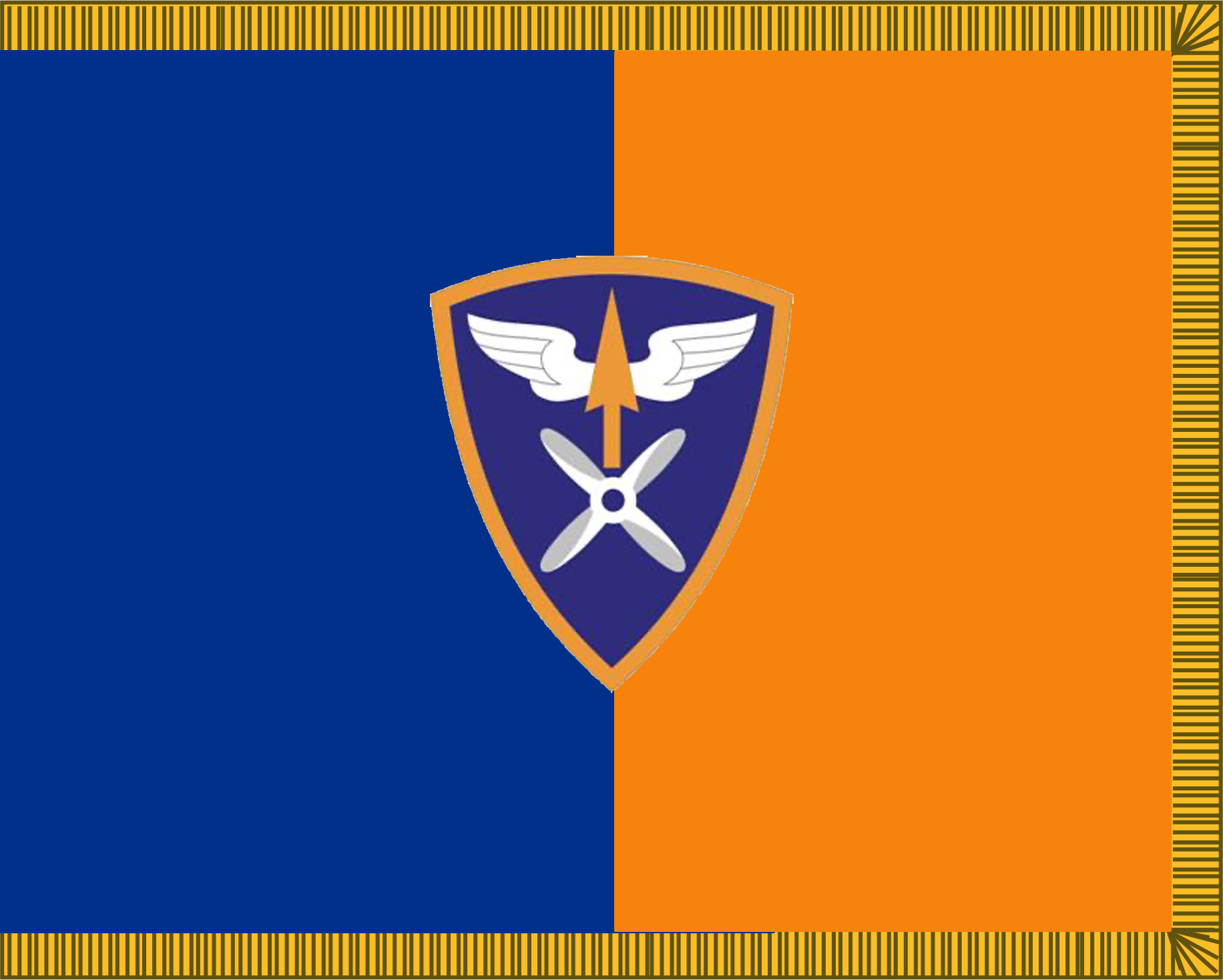
- 110th Aviation Brigade Flag

The 110th Aviation Brigade, of the United States Army, is responsible for overseeing all initial entry flight training at the United States Army Aviation Center of Excellence at Fort Rucker, Alabama. The aviation brigade operates an aircraft fleet of over 500 helicopters across five airfields to train nearly 2000 Army aviators each year, earning the distinction of being acknowledged as the largest military helicopter training organization in the world. It consists of a Headquarters, an academics section, a night vision device section, four subordinate aviation battalions, and an Army Reserve Augmentation Brigade Headquarters:

- 1st Battalion, 11th Aviation Regiment (Air Traffic Control)
- 1st Battalion, 14th Aviation Regiment, Hanchey Army Heliport (AH-64D/E)
- 1st Battalion, 212th Aviation Regiment, Lowe Army Heliport (UH-60M)
- 1st Battalion, 223rd Aviation Regiment, Cairns Army Airfield, Knox Army Heliport and Shell Army Heliport (UH-72), (CH-47F), (UH-72 Tactics)

== History ==
The 10th Aviation Group was activated on 30 June 1965 and evolved from the 10th Air Transport Brigade (Test). It supported the 11th Airborne Division (Air Assault). When the 11th was disbanded, the 10th remained at Fort Benning, Ga., to provide all aspects of training for Aviation companies preparing to deploy to Vietnam. The 10th Aviation Group was inactivated and redesignated back to the 10th Aviation Group in 2004. On 1 March 2005, the 10th Aviation Group was redesignated as the 110th Aviation Brigade. The Aviation Training Brigade at Fort Rucker assumed this unit designation and lineage on the same day. The mission of the 110th is to provide the Army and allied forces with professionally trained Aviators and non-rated crew members through planning, coordinating, and executing formal flight instruction at the undergraduate and graduate level.

The brigade also provides crash rescue and air ambulance support to USAACE and surrounding communities and serves as the Department of the Army Night Vision Device Training and Operations Staff Agency.

=== 1st Battalion, 11th Aviation Regiment ===
The 1-11th Aviation Regiment, reassigned to 110th Aviation Brigade in October 2010, provides air traffic services for all aviation training for U.S. Army Aviation Center of Excellence—including the operation of the Army’s largest Radar Approach Control.

=== 1st Battalion, 14th Aviation Regiment ===
The 1-14th Aviation Regiment at Hanchey Army Heliport trains Aviators in the Boeing AH-64D/E Apache

=== 1st Battalion, 223rd Aviation Regiment ===
The 1-223rd Aviation Regiment at Cairns Army Airfield and Knox AHP trains Aviators and flight engineers in the Boeing CH-47D/F Chinook aircraft, primary and instrument evaluations, and all Beechcraft C-12 Huron fixed-wing qualification courses.

C Company, 1-223rd Aviation Regiment (formerly 3-210th Aviation Regiment), conducts training in the Mil Mi-17 (NATO reporting name: Hip) helicopters.

=== 1st Battalion, 212th Aviation Regiment ===
The 1-212th Aviation Regiment at Lowe AHP and Shell AHP trains Aviators in the Sikorsky UH-60A/L/M Black Hawk aircraft and provides evaluation flights for the Initial Entry Rotary Wing students' basic combat skills phases of training. B Company, 1-212th Aviation Regiment (formerly the 2-210th Helicopter School Battalion), trains Spanish students in the UH-60 and Bell OH-58C Kiowa aircraft at Lowe and Shell AHPs.

== Lineage ==
Constituted 30 June 1965 in the Regular Army as Headquarters and Headquarters Company, 10th Aviation Group Activated 1 July 1965 at Fort Benning, Georgia

Inactivated 15 May 1970 at Fort Benning, Georgia

Activated 15 October 1991 at Fort Bragg, North Carolina

Redesignated 16 September 1992 as Headquarters and Headquarters Company, 229th Aviation Group

Inactivated 15 September 2004 at Fort Bragg, North Carolina, and concurrently redesignated as Headquarters and Headquarters Company, 10th Aviation Group Redesignated 1 March 2005 as Headquarters and Headquarters Company, 110th Aviation Brigade

Headquarters concurrently transferred to the United States Army Training and Doctrine Command and activated at Fort Rucker, Alabama

== Decorations ==
- Army Superior Unit Award, Streamer embroidered 1997

== Commanders ==
Officer	start	end
COL Haspard R. Murphy	Oct 84	Apr 87
COL Clinton B. Boyd	Apr 87	Sep 89
COL James C. Hardister	Sep 89	Aug 91
COL Thomas M. Roy	Aug 91	Aug 93
COL Edward H. Littlejohn	Aug 93	Aug 95
COL Michael T. Mulvenon	Aug 95	Aug 97
COL R. Lee Gore	Aug 97	Aug 99
COL Terry M. Peck	Aug 99	Jul 01
COL Michael A. Zonfrelli	Jul 01	Jul 03
COL Steven P. Semmens	Jul 03	Jul 05
COL Daniel S. Stewart	Jul 05	Jul 07
COL Terrance J. Dolan	Jul 07	Jul 09
COL Russell E. Stinger	Jul 09	Jul 11
COL Kevin J.Christensen	Jul 11	Aug 13
COL Jason A. Altieri	Aug 13	Jul 15
COL Kelly E. Hines	Jul 15	Aug 17
COL Chad E. Chasteen	Aug 17	Jul 19
COL George G. Ferido	Jul 19	Jun 21
COL Michael S. Johnson	Jun 21	Jun 23
