= Brotherhood of War =

Series of novels by W. E. B. Griffin

- Author: W. E. B. Griffin
- Genre: War Fiction
- No. of books: 9

The Brotherhood of War is a series of novels written by W. E. B. Griffin, about the United States Army from the Second World War through the Vietnam War. The story centers on the careers of four U.S. Army officers who became lieutenants in the closing stages of World War II and the late 1940s. The series is notable for the amount of attention it does not devote to combat. Rather than skipping forward, it follows the main characters though their peacetime service as the army evolves in the 1940s, 1950s and 1960s, particularly in the development of Army Aviation and the Special Forces.

== Novels ==
1. Book I, The Lieutenants (North Africa, Germany, Greece, CONUS 1942–1950)
2. Book II, The Captains (Korea 1950–1953)
3. Book III, The Majors (French Indochina, Algeria, CONUS 1954–1958)
4. Book IV, The Colonels (Vietnam, Cuba, Germany, CONUS 1958–1961)
5. Book V, The Berets (Vietnam, Germany, CONUS, 1961–1962)
6. Book VI, The Generals (Vietnam, CONUS, 1962–1985)
7. Book VII, The New Breed (Congo, CONUS, 1963–1964)
8. Book VIII, The Aviators (Vietnam, Congo, CONUS 1963–1965)
9. Book IX, Special Ops (Congo, Argentina, CONUS, 1965–1967)

== Primary cast of characters ==
=== Colonel Sanford "Sandy" Thaddeus Felter, USA ===
Sandy Felter is a son of Jewish immigrants. He resigns while a cadet corporal during his third year at the United States Military Academy (or West Point), to accept a direct commission as a second lieutenant and a German and Russian linguist in the last year of World War II. While doing so, he is instrumental in locating a group of Allied POWs being held by the Russians and assists in their rescue. (One of those POWs was Bob Bellmon, who would become a friend and mentor to Felter.) He subsequently goes to Parachute School and the Ranger course, and serves as a first lieutenant in Greece under Lt. Col. Paul T Hanrahan and with 2nd Lt. Craig W Lowell, who becomes his best friend.

Afterwards, Felter serves in Berlin as an intelligence officer. While stationed there, he discovers the whereabouts of Oberst Graf von Grieffenberg and arranges his repatriation. The Graf and Felter become close personal friends, which gives him a direct line into West German intelligence.

During the Korean War, he commands a covert, behind-the-lines operation with Captain Rudolph G. MacMillan, earning a Distinguished Service Cross for his combat valor. Felter subsequently becomes a counselor to the president for four U.S. presidents, from Eisenhower through Nixon. Though Felter tries several times to return to the conventional army, he is kept on in his role as Counselor to the President due to his uncanny ability to correctly predict the actions of the nation's enemies and to spot trouble before it happens. Perhaps the best example of this is Operation Earnest, a Special Forces mission authorized by President Johnson and commanded by Felter that prevented Che Guevara from taking over the Republic of the Congo as his first step in taking over South America.

In the books, Felter is respected, feared, and even hated because of the clout he wields with the President and his analytical and espionage abilities, as he usually has information before anyone else and is sometimes the only one to analyze that information correctly. Despite his short stature and unimposing appearance (earning him the nickname, "Mouse"), he is a highly capable, even ruthless, officer. Felter is an expert in tactics and one of the most combat-effective characters in the series. He prefers short range weapons such as the M1911 pistol, the Winchester Model 1897 12 gauge pump shotgun, and the Thompson submachine gun. He is literally a dead shot with the M1911, using a two hand stance long before this was the norm.

In the Epilogue of The Generals, Felter reaches the rank of lieutenant general, and ends his career as head of the Defense Intelligence Agency (DIA).

=== Colonel Rudolph George "Mac" MacMillan, USA ===
Mac MacMillan was a Regular Army Sergeant assigned to the 82nd Airborne Division, who received a battlefield commission while participating in Operation Market Garden, although he was taken prisoner before he learned of it. For his actions in that abortive river crossing, he was later awarded the Medal of Honor by President Harry Truman.

He was the senior NCO of the prisoners of war in the same POW camp as Bob Bellmon and after the officers were removed from the camp, organized a successful mass escape ahead of the invading Russians, for which he was awarded the Distinguished Service Cross.

MacMillan qualifies as an aviator prior to the Korean War, although his flying escapades are limited largely to The Captains. He works with Mouse Felter running Task Force Able, an intelligence-gathering and sabotage operation, in the Korean War.

MacMillan is better off financially than many suspect. He is a silent partner with his brother in an automobile dealership in Mauch Chunk, Pennsylvania in present-day Jim Thorpe, Pennsylvania and also in a truck stop they jointly own. However, he much prefers life as an army officer, and because of his Medal of Honor can pretty much serve for as long as he chooses.

Following an altercation with another officer in an officers' club in the pages of The Colonels, Mac is assigned as Red Hanrahan's deputy at the Special Warfare Center. Mac dies, apparently of a stroke, in the final pages of The Generals during Operation Monte Cristo, a raid to rescue American prisoners of war held by the North Vietnamese.

The Epilogue to The Generals says he is buried, with full military honors, in Mauch Chunk, Pennsylvania.

His wife Roxanne ("Roxy") responded to President Jimmy Carter's granting amnesty to the Vietnam War-era draft dodgers by sending him all of Mac's medals, including his Medal of Honor, accompanied by a nasty letter. They were returned to her by the White House along with a form letter stating that the President could not accept a present of any military medals, no matter the motivation of the sender.

=== Colonel Craig W. "the Duke" Lowell, USA ===
Craig Lowell is an extremely wealthy Harvard drop-out (he was actually expelled) who was drafted and sent to the US occupation forces in Germany, where his duties include being the Constabulary golf pro. Because of his polo-playing skills, he, as a Private First Class, was assigned to manage the polo team for the commanding general, "Porky" Waterford. Since he was essential to the general's team, and since a game against the French could only be played by officers, the General orders Mac MacMillan to get Lowell commissioned before the game. He is commissioned into the Finance Corps and detailed Armor.

When the general dies during the polo match, General Waterford's replacement, disgusted by the direct commissioning of Lowell just to play polo (which the replacement views as a breach of military ethics) uses Lowell to fill a levy for an advisor to the Greek Army in the Greek Civil War. Lowell had not been an officer long enough to rate an efficiency report, and the colonel in question did not want to go to the trouble of convening a Board of Officers to throw him out of the army.

There, Lowell meets Sandy Felter and serves under Paul "Red" Hanrahan. During heavy action in which all of the Greek officers and many soldiers in the unit to which Lowell is assigned are killed, despite serious wounds Lowell takes command and the survivors successfully hold the position. He is eventually awarded the (fictional) Order of St. George and St. Andrew, the highest award for bravery that Greece can bestow on a foreigner. When he is medevaced to Germany, he marries Ilse von Grieffenberg, whom he had known in both the literal and Biblical senses before his assignment to the Military Assistance Advisory Group Greece.

Upon his return to the US, Lowell remains in the army for a couple of years until his service obligation expires, most of the time at the Armor Board at Fort Knox working on the M3 90mm high velocity tank gun project. His son Peter-Paul was born at Knox, and he makes a close friend in Philip Sheriden Parker IV, his roommate during the Basic Officer's Course.

After being released from active duty, Lowell is accepted to, and graduates with a master's degree from, the Wharton School of Business without first having attaining a baccalaureate degree, normally a prerequisite for attending Wharton. (Lowell observed to Mouse Felter that Wharton makes exceptions for people who own banks.) While there, he joins the Pennsylvania Army National Guard where he is given command of a tank company and a promotion to captain. He is one of the first officers recalled to active duty when the Korean War breaks out.

In Korea, Lowell commands an element of the (fictional) 73rd Heavy Tank Battalion, "Task Force Lowell", so well that he is promoted to major at the age of 24 and rewarded with a Distinguished Service Cross. Task Force Lowell spearheaded the breakout from the Pusan Perimeter and made a deep strike far behind the North Korean lines, disrupting their supply chain and forcing the diversion of forces to deal with "the Duke," the nickname given him by his men.

Upon returning to the United States, Lowell attends the Advanced Armor Officer's course at Fort Knox, where one of his studies (in a Kafkaesque twist) includes analyzing and recommending improvements to the organization and operations of Task Force Lowell in Korea. He privately tells Sandy Felter that he felt he did it correctly the first time.

An incident with a visiting movie star in Korea, his appearing as a witness for the defense of Phil Parker during Parker's murder trial, his smart mouth, and a penchant for circumventing the rules when it suits him all hurt Lowell's career. When he is given a series of dead-end assignments to encourage him to resign his commission, he transfers to Army Aviation. Working independently, he begins developing combat tactics for the improved helicopters he is sure are in the equipment pipeline. Lowell singlehandedly saves the army's tank-busting helicopter project (and coincidentally, his career) by destroying half a dozen captured Soviet T-34 tanks at Ed Greer's funeral after Greer was killed by malfunctioning ordnance when the project was unveiled.

He is finally promoted to lieutenant colonel, after rescuing Sandy Felter and an "A" Team during the failed Bay of Pigs invasion. His promotion was personally ordered by President Kennedy as a reward for rescuing Felter. At the same time, he acquires a "rabbi" in General E.Z. Black, who oversees an officer he regards as brilliant if unorthodox.

Around the same time, Lowell was caught up in "Operation Bootstrap." Army regulations required that commissioned officers hold bachelor's degrees. (There are exceptions, but very few.) A number of good officers did not have such degrees; so the army sent them, still on active duty and all expenses paid, to college for up to two years to get one. Lowell went to Norwich University in Vermont and in 18 months took a bachelor's degree, summa cum laude, in Foreign Languages (German and Russian), while continuing to work for Army Aviation on the q.t. in his spare time. General Bellmon (who regarded Operation Bootstrap as idiotic) recounted the story of going to visit Lowell in Vermont to buck him up, and finding him on the ski slopes dressed in the height of European skiing fashion, surrounded by bevies of admiring snow bunnies.

An accomplished though reluctant staff officer, Lowell was instrumental in the formation of the army's first airmobile division, the First Air Cavalry Division. At the insistence of General Howard, Lowell was given a command in the First Air Cav. His administrative skills, along with his planning ability and superb combat leadership, make him an invaluable asset to almost every unit to which he is assigned. Lowell is also described as quite the "guardhouse lawyer" who knows how to manipulate the rules, use his rank, and turn situations to his advantage. The fact that the Duke is also Special Forces qualified, having earned his Green Beret in Greece by "on the job training," influences his assignments from time to time.

The Generals barely addresses Lowell's two full tours in Vietnam, first in command of an aviation battalion where his performance earned him a second award of the Distinguished Service Cross, several Air Medals and a promotion to full colonel; and a second tour in command of an aviation group (brigade) where several helicopters were shot out from under him.

His last assignment is as tactical commander of a mission to rescue POWs from the Song Tay POW camp. Because of his involvement with a prisoner of war's wife, he was involuntarily retired upon his return from the successful mission (see below).

Though Lowell spends most of the series as a reputed ladies' man, he was a faithful and devoted husband and father to Ilse von Greiffenberg Lowell and their son, "P.P." (Peter-Paul), until Ilse was killed in a car accident while Lowell was serving in Korea. Lowell's escapades with women nearly cost him his career more than once. His most notable affairs included Georgia Page, a Hollywood starlet whom he took to the front lines and with whom he allegedly had sex in a tank; Jane Cassidy, his married secretary, while stationed at Fort Rucker; and Cynthia Thomas, a wealthy journalist to whom he became engaged. Cynthia left Lowell at the altar, realizing that though she loved him deeply, they lived in two very different worlds that did not overlap and if they were foolish enough to marry, they would soon come to hate each other when one was forced to give up a career they loved.

His last affair, with Dorothy Sims, wife of an Air Force POW in Vietnam, was so far beyond acceptable military behavior that Lowell was immediately retired upon his return from Operation Monte Cristo despite its success. After Dorothy divorced her repatriated husband (something she had been planning to do before he was shot down), she and Lowell quietly married and have lived together monogamously ever since.

Lowell was admired and respected by the soldiers who served with him, though some more traditional officers, such as Bob Bellmon and Bill Roberts, dislike Lowell because of his apparent womanizing (according to Barbara Bellmon, Lowell has never seduced a woman and does not always have the sense to say no when he really ought to; women are always portrayed as seducing him) and his disregard for the rules in favor of obtaining results. Nonetheless, they all have grudging respect for both his administrative skills and his demonstrated abilities as a warrior.

=== Colonel Phillip Sheridan Parker IV, USA ===
A 1946 graduate of Norwich University, Phil Sheridan is a 5th-generation Army officer. Moses Parker, who named his son after his commander, General Phillip Sheridan, then the four PS Parkers. His great-great-grandfather was a member of the Tenth Cavalry, a distinguished unit of African-American soldiers known as the Buffalo Soldiers. Like his father, Phil IV began his career serving as an Armor officer. He commands a tank company with distinction in Korea, though his record is marred by an incident wherein Parker shoots a cowardly fellow officer. Because Parker is black, he knows he has to be the best in every class to stay even with the others in an army just beginning desegregation. He begins a lifelong friendship with Craig Lowell while attending the same Basic Armor Officer's course at Fort Knox (as told in Book I: The Lieutenants), where Parker is the top graduate, and Lowell is third in the class.

However, Parker's friendship with Lowell often works against Parker's career. Additionally, Parker's career is very nearly ended by the shooting incident in Korea, for which he is charged with murder. He is subsequently acquitted of the charge with the help of testimony given by Lowell, but both men are branded as troublemakers. Following their graduation from the Armor School, both are given dead-end assignments, but the intervention of a senator (at Lowell's cousin's suggestion) helps revive their careers.

Parker is recruited to Army Aviation by then-Colonel Bill Roberts and becomes dual-qualified to fly both fixed wing and rotary aircraft. Parker remains a captain for over 15 years, which he assumes is the result of the Korea incident. Frustrated by his lack of advancement, Parker volunteers for the Green Berets and is accepted by General Paul Hanrahan. Shortly thereafter, it is discovered that Parker's promotion has been held up by a freak clerical error, and he is promoted to major. Given the option to leave Special Forces once he has been promoted, Parker elects to stay and heads the de facto aviation section of Special Forces in its early days.

He marries Antoinette Parker, a doctor and former associate professor of pathology at Massachusetts General Hospital, at the end of Book II: The Captains. To be with her husband, Toni becomes a contract surgeon with the army and is almost always able to arrange to be assigned to the hospitals on the bases where Phil is stationed.

Parker is sent to Vietnam as an aviator and becomes a Prisoner of War through an act of sabotage on his OV-1 Mohawk (as told in Book VI: The Generals). Parker is ultimately rescued from a prisoner of war camp during a daring mission commanded by Lowell. Following his retirement from the army, he returns to Norwich as the Petrofsky Professor of Military History, a chair endowed (though the book does not say so, no other character had the necessary information about Petrofsky and the funds to do it) by Geoff Craig.

== Supporting cast of characters ==
=== Lieutenant General Robert F. Bellmon, USA ===
Bob Bellmon, USMA '39, the son of one general and the son-in-law of another (Porky Waterford), is a quintessential career army officer. As a very young armor major in the Army of the United States he is captured at the battle of Kasserine Pass. As a POW of the Germans in Poland, he is executive officer of the prisoner detachment and, since the senior officer has had a mental breakdown, its de facto commander. While a prisoner in the stalag commanded by Oberst Graf von Grieffenberg, he gave the Oberst his parole, was taken to the site of the Katyn Forest massacre, and entrusted with evidence proving the Soviets had committed the atrocity, requesting that he get it to the Western Allies, which he eventually did.

After his rescue from the Russians by Task Force Parker, Bellmon was repatriated to the United States and reduced in grade to major as part of the army's draw-down following World War II. Bellmon shifted from Armor to Army Aviation in time to be part of its expansion into a combat arm, was quickly promoted, and eventually became the Commanding General of the Army Aviation base at Fort Rucker. He later commanded the XVIIIth Airborne Corps in one of his final assignments. While he is portrayed as a bit of a stuffed shirt who has a problem with officers who don't go by the book (particularly Green Berets), there is no doubt as to his abilities and his devotion to the US Army.

The Bellmons are well-off financially. The Waterfords owned a substantial amount of property on the California coast near Carmel before selling it off at high prices, and Barbara inherited that money. The Bellmons own a large farm in Virginia, long since paid for, and continue to receive money from the crops grown on the farm, much of which has been invested in stocks and bonds. In The New Breed, it is observed that the income from the Bellmon/Waterford investments is much greater than his salary as a general officer. It is for this reason Bob and Barbara Bellmon are able to relate effectively to Craig Lowell.

Although there is four grades-worth of difference in rank between him and Sandy Felter, Bellmon and Felter become good friends, to the point his children refer to Felter as "Uncle Sandy." He watched over Felter's career until the Mouse became a counselor to the president in Eisenhower's presidency, and Kennedy's, Johnson's, and Nixon's after that. Despite the disparity in their ranks, and particularly when Felter is acting as the Action Officer for secret missions like Operation Dragon Rouge, Operation Earnest, and Operation Monte Cristo, he treats Felter as an equal as well as a friend.

The Bellmon character in part resembles General John K. Waters, who was the real life son-in-law of Patton and a POW in Germany after he was taken prisoner while fighting in Tunisia, in 1943.

=== Major General Paul T. "Red" Hanrahan, USA ===
One of the original Airborne officers before the war (despite his fear of parachuting; Mac MacMillan had to push him out the door on his first jump), Red Hanrahan served in the OSS in Greece during World War II, nominally as a Signal Corps Officer. He twice parachuted behind enemy lines to join the partisans during the war, and wears two combat stars on his jump wings. He served as Felter's and Lowell's commanding officer when they were advisors during the Greek Civil War. He is an advocate of the concept of using Special Forces to train and assist allies in fighting their own wars.

During the French war in Indochina, Hanrahan was assigned as a military attache in Saigon and narrowly avoids an ambush that would have killed him and his family, who were with him on the assignment. His reports on what the French and the Viet Minh were doing were received at the highest levels of the army, and led to his next assignment. (Mouse Felter had a great deal to do with it, arranging for President Eisenhower to send his name to the Senate for confirmation as a full colonel.)

Colonel Hanrahan was named Commandant of the John F. Kennedy Special Warfare Center and School at Fort Bragg. He remains there for the rest of his career, fighting with the regular army establishment to make them understand that what the Green Berets do is unorthodox by regular army standards, but is as important as what the other combat branches do. He is promoted to the rank of brigadier general by President Kennedy, and later to major general by either Johnson or Nixon. By the time Operation Monte Cristo is staged, he is a major general (as established in the beginning of The Generals).

In the Epilogue to The Generals, it is established that General Hanrahan retired from the army shortly after the end of the Vietnam War. He went on to a second career as a professor of Romance languages at a college in upstate New York.

Hanrahan's real-life counterpart as the Special Forces Commandant during that era was then-Brigadier General William P. Yarborough, who arranged for President Kennedy to approve the famed green berets worn by Special Forces.

=== Barbara Waterford Bellmon ===
The daughter of General Porky Waterford, Barbara is the classic officer's wife, assisting with the families of her husband's command. She is amused by some of the junior officers and often reminds her husband to relax a little with them. Other characters in the series describe her as "the perfect officer's wife." She has two children, Marjorie (who eventually marries Jacques Portet) and Robert, a West Pointer and army aviator qualified in rotary and fixed wing aircraft.

She is tremendously fond of Craig Lowell and treats him as a little brother, including organizing his (aborted) marriage to Cynthia Thomas. After Bellmon's death, she becomes a Congresswoman from California, where their home is located.

=== Colonel Phillip Sheridan Parker III, USA, Retired ===
A Norwich graduate, before the war Colonel Parker III was the last Commandant of the Equestrian School at Fort Riley. During the war, he commanded a colored tank destroyer regiment in North Africa and Western Europe under General "Porky" Waterford. Without orders, he led the task force that rescued Bob Bellmon. General Waterford once told his son-in-law Bob Bellmon that "You owe Phil Parker, Bob. That operation he mounted to go get you cost him his star." He is a soldier's soldier.

The Colonel is a career Regular Army establishment officer who is respected by Craig Lowell. Since his retirement, he focuses on training hunting dogs and dedicates much of his time to hunting and fishing.

=== Generalleutnant Graf Peter Paul von Greiffenberg ===
A member of the German professional officer corps, as an Oberst he is made commandant of the POW camp where Bob Bellmon is held. Von Greiffenberg had been wounded while commanding a regiment and was relegated to this duty. While commandant of the camp, after receiving Bellmon's parole he takes him to the site of the Katyn massacre of Polish officers by the Soviets and provides him with evidence that it was the NKVD and not the Germans who murdered the Poles, requesting that he get it to the Western Allies.

For nearly five years after the war he was a prisoner in a Gulag camp, and was identified and repatriated by Sandy Felter, whereupon von Greiffenberg found his daughter had married Craig Lowell and had a son named Peter Paul. According to the books, von Greiffenberg is one of the few German officers who had participated in the 20 July plot to kill Hitler whose involvement remained undiscovered.

After the war, he becomes the second-in-command of the West German Federal Intelligence Service (BND). He is a close friend of Sandy Felter and regards Craig Lowell as a son, his own having been killed during the war. Lowell's son Peter-Paul lives with him at Schloss Greiffenberg until the two of them have a falling-out over American participation in the Vietnam War. In the Epilogue of The Generals, it is established that a rapprochement between the Graf and his grandson was arranged by Ursula Craig during the Graf's final illness.

=== Ilse von Greiffenberg Lowell ===
Ilse is Graf von Greiffenberg's daughter and becomes Craig Lowell's wife following his return from Greece. When Ilse joins Craig at Fort Knox, she is befriended by Barbara and Bob Bellmon, who are also assigned there. In addition to having been her father's captor during the war, Bob Bellmon and Graf von Grieffenberg had been students at the French Saumur Cavalry School together and the families grew close.

Her entry into the Lowell family is not as smooth. Craig's alcoholic mother calls her a whore and golddigger and at first refuses to accept her, though Craig's cousin Porter and his wife Helene do. Eventually, following a sharp confrontation with her son, Craig's mother grudgingly accepts Ilse as her son's wife and the mother of her grandchild, though no love is lost between the two women; Ilse can be as hardheaded as an army mule and never forgot the scene when they first met or what she was called by her mother-in-law.

She is killed in an automobile accident in Germany caused by a drunken US Army Quartermaster Officer, while Craig is in Korea. Ilse was interred in the family crypt at Schloss von Grieffenberg near Marberg an der Lahn, West Germany.

=== Major George Washington "Father" Lunsford, USA ===
A native of Philadelphia, G.W. Lunsford entered the army upon his graduation from the University of Pennsylvania. The youngest of four children, he comes from a family of doctors; his father and oldest brother are surgeons, his second brother is a psychiatrist, and his leftist sister holds a Ph.D. from and is a professor at Swarthmore College, which Father refers to as "Joseph Stalin U", due to its many left-wing and socialist academics.

A talented, black Army Special Forces officer, Lunsford served a tour in Vietnam in command of an A Team, where he came to know then-Lieutenant John Oliver, who flies Father and his A Team in and out of Laos on classified missions using an innovative insertion technique developed by the two of them. Wounded on one such mission, when Oliver takes command of the team and leads them out of Laos, he recommends Oliver for the Silver Star and the Combat Infantryman Badge.

His proficiency in Swahili allows him to play a key role in support of operations in the Congo. He spent almost half a year in his own words, "running around in the bush with the Simbas," during which time he would have been tortured to death had his true identity been discovered. When the Simbas captured Stanleyville, Lunsford made his way to the apartment building where Hanni Portet, Ursula Craig, and Jeffy Craig are sheltering after being stranded by Sabena Airlines and protects them from the rebels. He becomes a good friend to John Oliver and Jacques Portet as a result. President Johnson personally decorated him for his service in the Congo Crisis with a Silver Star (his third).

After his repatriation to the United States following Operation Dragon Rouge and his eventual release from the hospital (he was suffering from intestinal parasites and a couple of rare African diseases) and his promotion to major, he is tasked by General Hanrahan with creating a team of exclusively black Green Berets that can defeat the Simba rebels. Along the way, that mission is expanded by Counselor to the President Sandy Felter to become Operation Earnest. Operation Earnest is the defeating of Che Guevara's goal of first, taking over the Simba rebellion and second, taking over the Congo and turning it into a Communist state.

He meets and later marries his wife, Cecilia Taylor, a CIA agent and the station chief first in Rwanda, and later in the Congo, while commanding Special Forces Detachment 17 in the Congo. He is instrumental in thwarting Che's attempt to prove himself as The Great Revolutionary Leader in the Congo, running him out of the country with his tail between his legs as an utter failure. General Joseph-Désiré Mobutu comes to know Lunsford and in addition to cooperating with the work of SF Detachment 17, decorates Lunsford for his work in combating the Simbas.

He and several alumni of Special Detachment 17 follow Guevara to Bolivia and observe his efforts to establish a revolutionary organization there. Despite orders from President Johnson that Guevara is to be kept alive (Johnson has come around to Mouse Felter's opinion that Guevara alive as a Communist failure will be less trouble than as a martyred revolutionary), they are unable to prevent Guevara's execution by the Bolivian government.

Lunsford appears in The Aviators, The New Breed, and Special Ops. Nothing is known of his career following Guevara's execution. It may be presumed that Lunsford remains in Special Forces. However, it is also possible he went on to a second career with the CIA. During the run-up to Operation Earnest, the CIA station chief in Buenos Aires told him that he knew how he'd come to receive his third Silver Star, and that "If you ever want to change employers, give me a call."

=== Brigadier General [Select] Geoff Craig, USA ===
Craig Lowell's cousin (see Porter Craig; Other notable characters), Geoff Craig was drafted into the army at the end of his junior year at Princeton and sent to the stockade after assaulting his basic training NCO (in response to being hit first by the sergeant). Craig Lowell was able to get him into the Special Forces Basic Course, where on completion of the course Geoff was given a promotion to Sergeant. While in Vietnam, Geoff received a battlefield commission after taking command of a Special Forces base during a Vietcong assault when all the officers and noncoms senior to him were killed or wounded.

During the Basic Course, he began a relationship with Karl-Heinz Wagner's sister Ursula. They married when he finished the course and his family accepted her, with his cousin Craig smoothing the way for them. Craig Lowell served as best man, and Sandy Felter gave the bride away in the absence of her brother.

After Vietnam, he became an aviator, qualifying in both rotary and fixed-wing aircraft. He is temporarily assigned to Special Forces Detachment 17 during Operation Earnest and is instrumental in interdicting the Cuban attempts to resupply the Simbas.

After Vietnam, his assignments are not discussed, save for the fact that he commanded an Airborne regiment that jumped into Grenada as part of Operation Urgent Fury, as mentioned in the Epilogue to The Generals. As an aviator and brigadier general in the Pentagon in Washington, he plays a critical role in army aviation and with covert operations around the world.

=== 1st Lieutenant Jacques Emile "Jack" Portet, USAR ===
The American-born son of a commercial airline pilot from the former Belgian Congo, Jacques Portet was born in the United States. Following the death of his mother and before his father's remarriage, he was raised by an aunt and uncle in St. Louis. He was educated at the Culver Military Academy and is a graduate of the Free University of Brussels with a degree in history.

Portet was drafted into the army in 1963 and initially trained as an 11-Mike mechanized infantryman despite his qualifications as a commercial pilot and his fluency in Swahili and several other African languages. He volunteers for Jump School, qualifies as a parachutist, and is recruited by Sandy Felter as an expert on the Congo. He qualifies as a Green Beret in what is described by General Hanrahan as a "jackleg course" prior to Operation Dragon Rouge, a joint Belgian-American mission to rescue civilians threatened by the Simba rebels in the Congo. Ignoring orders to the contrary, he jumps with the Belgian paratroopers to rescue his mother, sister, and Ursula and Jeffy Craig; and is later decorated by the Belgians, the Congolese, and the American military for his valor.

He is an accomplished aviator, whose knowledge of sub-Saharan Africa, its people, and fluency in Swahili is substantial. His connections in the business and political community of the Congo proves invaluable in Operation Earnest, the preventing of Che Guevara's taking over the Congo, as detailed in The Aviators, Special Ops, and The New Breed.

He meets and later marries the Bellmons' daughter Marjorie, and much to her dismay accepts a direct commission in the Army Reserve, though she quickly comes to terms with it. (She wanted him safe and sound at the Instrument Examination Board, not heading off into a war zone.) He and Father Lunsford later are involved in a mission to observe Che Guevara's attempt to foment revolt in Bolivia.

Nothing is known of Portet's later career, but it seems unlikely that he returned to the Congo following his military service. His father sold the family home in the Congo and his company, Air Simba. The family resettled near Key West and Captain Portet the elder set up an air freight company that the CIA hoped (and failed) to use as a less obvious version of Air America. The deal was brokered by Porter Craig, who outmaneuvered the agency operatives trying to take over Intercontinental Air Cargo.

=== Captain John S. Oliver Jr., USA ===
A Norwich University graduate, Captain Oliver served in Vietnam, commanding the 170th Assault Helicopter Company as a First Lieutenant (in a berth the TO&E requires be filled by a field grade officer) until relieved after a couple of months by a major. He earned the Combat Infantryman Badge during a Special Forces operation where his helicopter was shot down. As the only unwounded officer, he took command and led the Green Beret A-Team to safety through the jungle, for which he was awarded the Silver Star and unusually for an aviator, the Combat Infantry Badge. He served as General Bellmon's aide-de-camp while stationed at Fort Rucker.

General Bellmon had hoped that Johnny might marry Marjorie, but the two became close friends instead. The General keeps an eye on his career and is Johnny's mentor in the army. He eventually marries Liza Wood, the widow of a flight school classmate who was killed in Vietnam after overcoming Liza's conflict between loving him and hating the fact he might die in the nation's service.

Like Bellmon, Lowell, and his buddy Geoff Craig, Johnny Oliver is well off. In his case, his wealth was inherited. His father had built a successful truck stop in Vermont, and the will specified that either his much older sister or Johnny could buy the other out if one made an offer to the other in cash. When his sister, whose husband managed the place, made such an offer in an attempt to buy the truck stop out from under him for about 10% of its fair market value, Oliver consulted Craig Lowell, who put one of his investment bank's real estate lawyers onto the case. Discovering that clause, Craig, Powell, Kenyon & Dawes loaned Oliver the money to buy out his sister, who went berserk at being out-conned. The settlement eventually reached between the siblings left Johnny a multi-millionaire (in 1960s dollars). However, like the other wealthy soldiers in the series, all Johnny wants to do is continue his career as a military officer. His last reported assignment was as commanding officer of a Special Forces unit assigned to train a Bolivian ranger battalion.

=== Sharon Felter ===
Sharon is Sandy Felter's wife; they have been committed to each other since high school. Initially, she hated Sandy for wanting to be a soldier but has come to love the life they have. Later in the series, she wishes Sandy were a regular soldier but understands his importance to the President. Sandy's role as an intelligence officer leaves her yearning for a life like her friends'.

She helped bury Craig Lowell's wife, Ilse, when Lowell was in Korea. When Sandy was believed to have died in a plane crash at Dien Bien Phu, she helped comfort Lowell (when he should have been comforting her) when he was sent to notify her Felter was missing and presumed lost.

She, and Barbara Bellmon, both regard Lowell as a mischievous younger brother. Lowell regards Sharon more fondly than any other woman in his life and often joked that if anything were to happen to Sandy he would quickly propose, remarking to one friend that he frequently considered running Sandy over with a truck so he could marry the widow.

=== Dorothy Sims ===
The wife of a prisoner of war during the Vietnam War and an activist for POW families as well as an advocate for the return of the prisoners being held by the North Vietnamese, Dorothy becomes involved with Craig Lowell. Craig and Dorothy fall in love during the run-up to Operation Monte Cristo and married soon after she divorced her husband, Colonel Thomas Sims, USAF, whom Lowell rescued from a POW camp. Lowell's relationship with Dorothy ultimately ruins his reputation, and costs him his military career. Following his involuntary retirement, the couple share a long and loving marriage.

== Other notable characters ==
- General E. Z. Black – Armor officer, division and corps commander in Korea (see I. D. White). Later served as vice chief of staff and CINCPAC. Longtime protector of Mac MacMillan (The Captains, The Colonels); also the officer who rescued Craig Lowell's career at the end of The Majors. He later specifically requested Lowell for a difficult assignment in the early days of Vietnam, and rewarded him for it with a Legion of Merit. Black was responsible for Lowell's assignment to a combat command when the First Air Cavalry Division was activated.
- Porter Craig – Craig Lowell's cousin and father of Geoffrey Craig; Porter is the chairman of the board of the Lowell/Craig family firm of investment bankers, Craig, Powell, Kenyon, and Dawes. In the early books of the series, their relationship is somewhat adversarial and strained, as they are forced to share equal interest in the firm. By the later books their relationship has warmed, and they are quite fond of each other. Porter and his wife, Helene, sort of adopt the Portet family after Jack Portet rescues Hanni, Ursula, and Jiffy from the Simbas, breaking a family rule and selling them a family mansion. Porter later assists Captain Portet in setting up Air Intercontinental Cargo, negotiating a deal with the CIA's bank so brilliant that Craig Lowell says he got both ears and the tail, because the CIA is financing the airline but can't get control of it.
- Lieutenant Commander Edward Eaglebury, USN – Naval intelligence officer and aviator assigned to U.S. Army Special Forces; disguised as an army sergeant first class, he served as Tom Ellis' tormentor during the latter's Green Beret training cycle (featured in The Colonels). Commander Eaglebury was killed while looking for missile sites in Cuba during the MIssile Crisis. He was decorated posthumously with the Distinguished Service Cross by President Kennedy for his actions in The Berets.
- 1st Lieutenant Tom Ellis – Airborne and later Green Beret officer (introduced in The Colonels, featured in The Berets). Tom Ellis was an OCS graduate who enlisted to be a cook and then went to Officer Candidate and Airborne Schools at Fort Benning. to avoid the kitchen. He was picked up by Col. MacMillan while hitchhiking to Fort Bragg because he had lost his car playing poker. Served as aide to Paul Hanrahan after Hanrahan's promotion to brigadier general. Commanded the "A" Team picked up by Craig Lowell in Cuba. Died after stepping on a Punji stick while leading an unauthorized patrol in Vietnam, while acting as an officer courier. Went AWOL in returning to the United States rather than undergoing proper medical care for his infections in Vietnam.
- Major William Franklin – Early army warrant officer aviator. An African-American, he met and became friends with Craig Lowell while both served as observers to the French army in the Algerian campaigns. At first Franklin was a photographer only. With a little "bootleg" flight training from Lowell he discovers a love of aviation and becomes a pilot himself. He briefly leaves the army mid-career but quickly loses interest in life as a civilian photographer and returns. He is promoted from warrant officer to lieutenant for his role assisting Lowell in rescuing Felter during the abortive Bay of Pigs invasion.
- 1st Lieutenant Ed C. Greer – Early army warrant officer aviator (featured in The Majors). Former assistant to Gen. E. Z. Black. While serving as Black's "eyes and ears" on a secret mission with MacMillan and Felter to Dien Bien Phu, their plane is shot down on approach to the base. He saves MacMillan from Viet Minh capture or death as they begin an overland odyssey to safety. Later sent by Black to Warrant Officer Candidate (WOC) school at Ft. Rucker to learn how to fly, he served in Algeria after Craig Lowell and Bill Franklin. Married Melody Dutton, daughter of a banker in Dothan, Alabama, home of Fort Rucker. Pilot of the ill-fated H-19 "Big Bad Bird" tank-busting helicopter, he dies as a result of malfunctioning ordnance.
- Major General Paul T. Jiggs – army armor officer and aviation convert; Served as Craig Lowell's CO with the 73rd Heavy Tank in Korea and later became the commanding general of Fort Rucker. Jiggs is one of Lowell's biggest supporters among the general officers and serves as a mentor.
- Major General Angus C. "Scotty" Laird – army general and aviation convert (Introduced in The Majors) (see also Bogardus Snowden Cairns and Cairns Army Airfield#History). Dies as a result of pilot error; Lt. Greer sees the crash and attempts to rescue him, but is too late.
- Colonel William R. Roberts – West Point graduate (Class of '40), longtime army aviation visionary and promoter. Frequently at odds with Bob Bellmon. Colonel, later Brigadier General Roberts, was one of the first army aviators and went through the first army aviation class before they numbered them — "The Class Before One". The character is possibly inspired by General Robert B. Williams.
- Peter-Paul von Greiffenberg Lowell – Son of Craig W. Lowell and Ilse von Greiffenberg. Born at Ft. Knox when his father attended the Basic Officer Course. After his grandfather, the Graf Peter Paul von Greiffenberg, was freed from a Siberian Prison Camp, he and his mother lived with the Graf along with other members of the von Greiffenberg family in Germany. When his mother was killed in the car accident, he was taken care of by his grandfather and the women of the family. Peter-Paul and his father, Craig, had an in-and-out relationship as his father's devotion was to the army for most of his childhood. In later years, Peter-Paul became a journalist with a leftist bent. He and his father had a falling out in "The Generals", after a conflict of interest over the confidentiality of Operation Monte Cristo that almost saw him thrown out of a helicopter for refusing to turn over the evidence he had accumulated concerning the op. (Before that, Peter-Paul was estranged from Colonel Lowell because he had renounced his American citizenship to avoid service in Vietnam, able to do so because of his mother's German citizenship.) He also became estranged from his grandfather, Generalleutnant Graf von Greiffenberg, despite being the Graf's heir to his title due to his political views. He was reconciled with the Graf shortly before the Graf's passing in a meeting arranged by Ursula Craig. Graf Peter-Paul Lowell von Greiffenberg is married and has one son, who is styled the Baron von Kolberg.
- Karl Wagner – Born in East Germany, Wagner served in the Pioneer Corps (combat engineers) of the East German Army, rising to the rank of Oberleutnant (first lieutenant). Assigned to a unit tasked with making improvements to the Berlin Wall, this crystallized his disenchantment with the East German regime. He escaped to the West by ordering his men to stack bags of cement in an army truck to form a barrier-cum-foxhole, putting his sister Ursula in the back, and crashing through a stretch of the Wall where he knew the mines had been removed and the concrete barrier wall had not yet been installed. After being cleared by US Army Counterintelligence, he and Ursula were flown to the United States, where he enlisted in the Army. Making PFC as the honor graduate of his company, he applied for and was accepted for Special Forces training, where he and Ursula met then-Private Geoffrey Craig. Graduated early from the SF Basic Course, he came to the attention of Sandy Felter, which had effects on his later career. Following a tour in Vietnam and going through Officers Candidate School to be commissioned as a lieutenant, Felter sent him undercover with the noted mercenary Colonel Michael "Mad Mike" Hoare, becoming a captain in the Katangese Gendarmerie during the suppression of the Simba Rebellion in the Congo, in conjunction with Operation Earnest. The books are silent on his assignments after this, but in The Generals it was established that he had done at least one more tour in Vietnam, during which he was wounded and paralyzed from the waist down. He was medically retired from the Army because of this. Geoff Craig noted he seldom visits his brother-in-law because Karl keeps asking Geoff "to buy him a pistol. He does not like being a paraplegic."
- Chief Warrant Officer Stefan Wojinski – Wojinski is one of the original Special Forces soldiers. Though not mentioned in The Lieutenants he served in Greece with the main characters as a Technical Sergeant (and most likely served in World War II in some capacity as well). Wojinski is introduced as a Master Sergeant at the Special Warfare School and assists Hanrahan and Macmillian in running the school, becoming a close ally. During a mission to steal radios from the USAF to be used in the Bay of Pigs invasion Wojinski also becomes close to Eaglebury and Craig Lowell. Wojinski accompanies Lowell on his Cuban rescue mission armed with nothing more than a .45 and as a result is promoted to Warrant Officer by the direction of President Kennedy. Wojinski further assists Lowell and Felter during the climactic prison raid in The Generals and in the epilogue is mentioned as retiring from the army and opening a car dealership in Wilkes-Barre, PA.

== Inconsistencies and historical integration ==
- Repeated references are made to the "Expert Combat Infantryman Badge", though no such award exists. The army awards the Combat Infantryman Badge or the Expert Infantryman Badge.
- In The Lieutenants, Stalag XVII-B is erroneously located some 5 miles south of Szczecin (today it is a Polish city); another erroneous reference locates the camp in a former Cavalry barracks from the Polish Army (before World War II Szczecin was part of Germany, so there was no cavalry barracks of the Polish Army near the city). The real location of Stalag XVII-B was not in Pomerania, as described in the book. Among other mistakes when using German phrases and abbreviations Griffin took the wrong denomination for the mentioned POW camp. Stalag is an abbreviation for Stammlager, referring to camps for enlisted personnel. Officers were imprisoned in an Offlag (abbreviation for Offizierslager).
- The operation to free American officers from their new Soviet captors described in The Lieutenants is informally based on the failed Task Force Baum set up by U.S. Army General George S. Patton and commanded by Capt. Abraham Baum in late March 1945.
- World War II Major General Porky Waterford, who commissioned Craig W. Lowell in The Lieutenants, was modelled using character traits of George S. Patton. The principal traits borrowed from Patton were his fondness for eye-catching uniforms and the wearing of no longer authorized riding breeches and riding boots; and his habit of wearing headgear decorated with the insignia of the unit he commanded.
- In The Lieutenants, reference is made to firearms not "on the books" and thus accountable to the Army. One type mentioned is the "Russian Moissant Nagant rifle." Presumably Griffin is referring to the 7.62x54R Mosin-Nagant rifle.
- In The Lieutenants, Lowell is evacuated from Greece in a British "Sutherland" "seaplane". Presumably this is meant to be a Sunderland flying boat. The Short Sunderland was used during the Berlin Airlift to ferry salt to the city and landed on the Havel lakes, making Lowell's evacuation using one plausible.
- In The Lieutenants, MacMillan in the spring of 1945 escapes via "neutral port" of Odessa, on the Black Sea, to Cairo, Egypt and subsequently to the US. However, Odessa was liberated by Soviet Army 3rd Ukrainian Front on April 10, 1944. In 1945, Odessa was under Soviet rule and thus couldn't be "neutral".
- In The Captains, General MacArthur is mentioned as having received the Medal of Honor during the First World War. However, he did not receive it until 1942 at the direction of General George C. Marshall, for his leadership in the defense of the Philippines.
- In The Colonels, Sandy Felter attends a meeting in a conference room at CIA headquarters – in 1959. The building wasn't complete until the 1960s, so the meeting would have been at a building in Washington, D.C., instead.
- In Special Ops the C-46 transport aircraft operated by "Air Simba" in the Congo is mentioned as a "Boeing C-46", actually, it was manufactured by Curtiss-Wright.
- While "Scotty" Laird (The Majors) is mentioned as the namesake of the airfield at Ft. Rucker following his crash at the controls of his H-13, a later book (Special Ops) makes reference to the same helicopter crash naming the real General Bogardus Snowden Cairns, after whom the Cairns Army Airfield at Ft. Rucker airfield was named. Cairns died in an H-13 Sioux crash 9 December 1958.
- There are several minor anachronisms in the books. For example, in The Majors, there is a reference to Xerox copiers (not available until 1959), and an Alabama ZIP code is used (though ZIP codes were not introduced by the postal service until 1963).
- In this series of books, Griffin incorporates many of his own experiences from his service in the U.S. Army and captures some of the critical and little-known episodes in the evolution of new branches of arms, such as Special Forces and Airmobile Operations. In the afterword of The Aviators, he pays tribute to a long-time friend (Col. Clifford Merritt Walker Jr.) whose exploits as a Huey pilot in Vietnam served as the inspiration for the events surrounding Capt. John Oliver's award of the Combat Infantryman's Badge.
- The successful prison camp rescue mission is based on Operation Ivory Coast in which a rescue of American POWs was attempted at Sơn Tây prison camp on 21 November 1970. The mission, while a tactical success, failed due to the prisoners' having been moved to another camp several months prior to the operation.
