= Bogardus Snowden Cairns =

United States Army general (1910–1958)

Bogardus S. Cairns
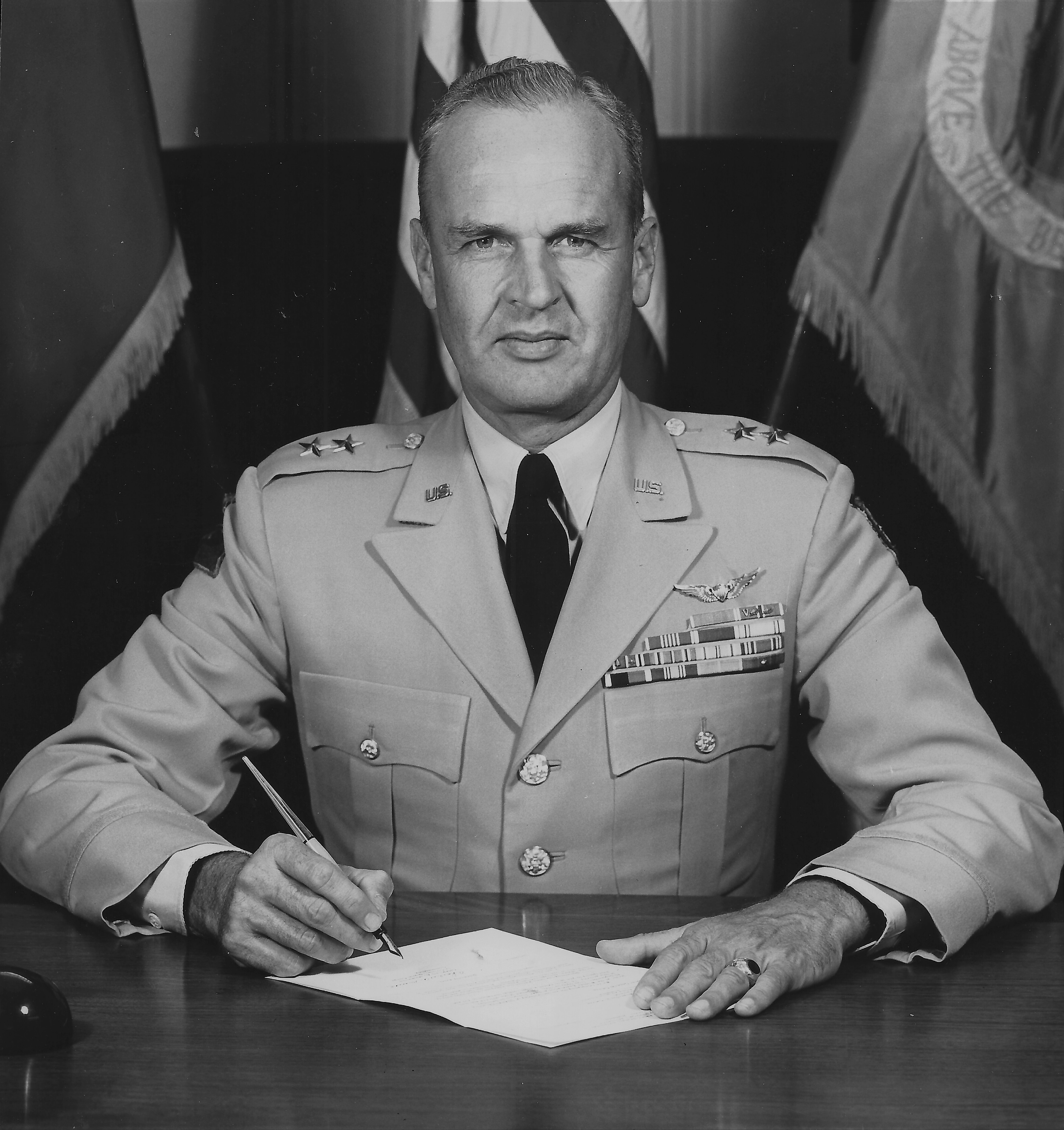
- Born: February 14, 1910; Brooklyn, New York, United States
- Died: December 9, 1958 (aged 48); Fort Rucker, Alabama, United States
- Burial place: Arlington National Cemetery, Virginia, United States
- Military career
- Allegiance: United States
- Branch: United States Army
- Service years: 1932–1958
- Rank: Major General
- Nickname: "Bugs"
- Commands: U.S. Army Aviation School
- Conflicts: World War II; Operation Torch; Battle of Anzio; Liberation of Rome
- Awards: Legion of Merit; Bronze Star Medal (3); Army Commendation Medal; Purple Heart

Bogardus Snowden Cairns (February 14, 1910 – December 9, 1958) was a U.S. Army cavalry officer who served as the Commanding General of Fort Rucker, Alabama, and as Commandant of the Army Aviation School in 1957–1958. He was one of the key developers of the armed helicopter and the first to formally apply cavalry doctrine to Air Mobility. After his death in a helicopter crash while serving at Fort Rucker, Ozark Field was renamed Cairns Army Airfield in January 1959. He was en route to Matteson Range to observe a firepower rehearsal in preparation for a full-scale armed helicopter display.

== Early life ==
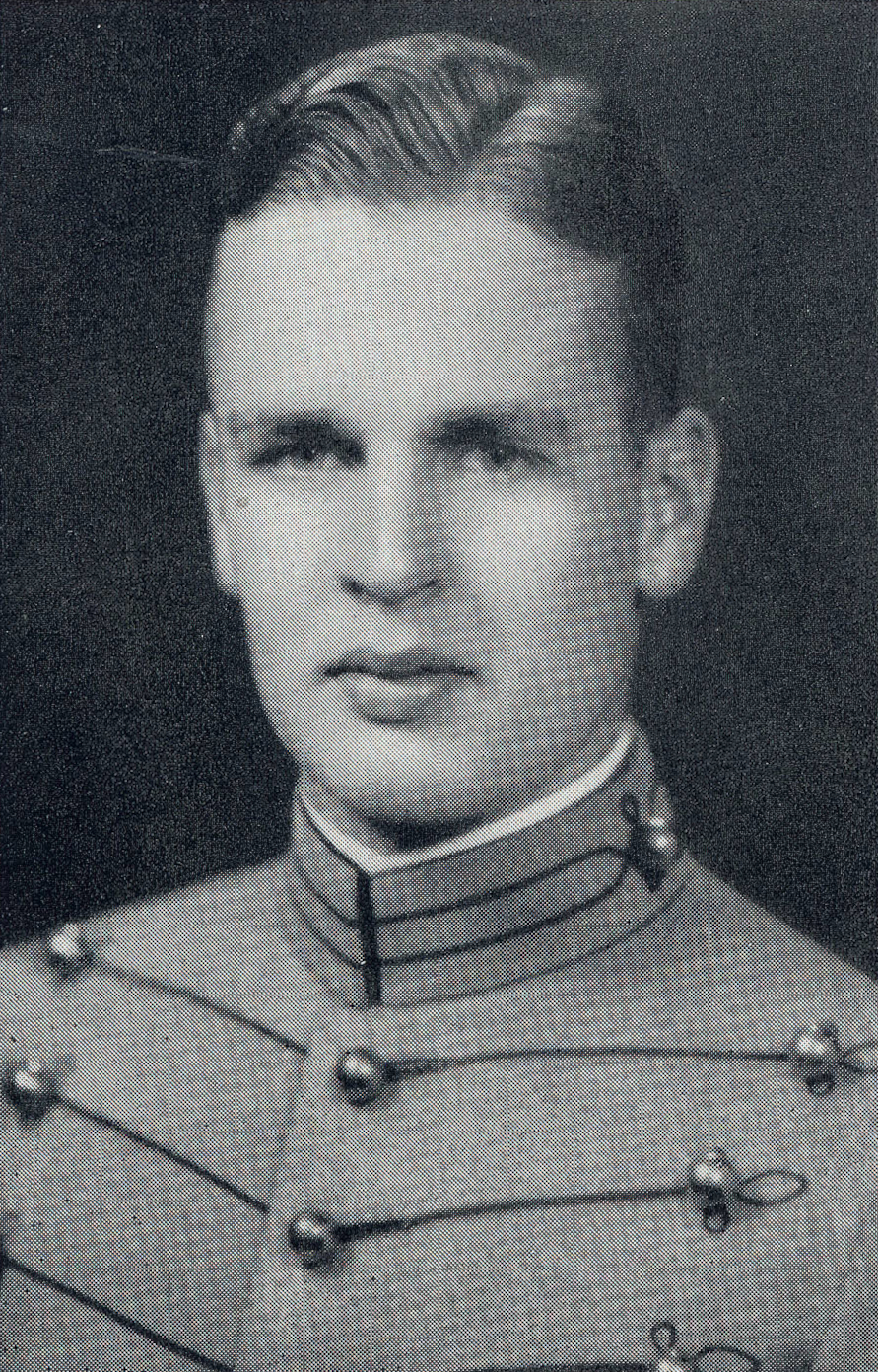
Cairns as a West Point cadet, 1932

Cairns was born to a career Army doctor, Lieutenant Colonel Douglas Walker Cairns and Ethel Moore Cairns, on February 14, 1910, in Brooklyn, New York. His father went on active duty during the First World War. The senior Cairns was with Gen. John J. "Blackjack" Pershing during the Pancho Villa expedition and subsequently at Governor's Island, New York. Bugs Cairns and his brother, Colonel (Army Air Corps and USAF) Douglas Moore Cairns, graduated from West Point in 1932 and 1933 respectively. Cairns was named for two of his ancestors, Brigadier General Robert Bogardus, who had been in charge of the defense of New York during the War of 1812, and his great uncle, Colonel Robert Bogardus Snowden, who had been the tip of Longstreet's spear at the Battle of Chickamauga during the Civil War. He was descended from Captain Robert Walker, an officer in the American Revolution. He was descended from Dominie Everardus Bogardus, the first Dutch Reformed pastor in New Amsterdam who arrived in 1634, and Isaac Snowden, one of the treasurers of the Continental Congress and the Treasurer of the City of Philadelphia.

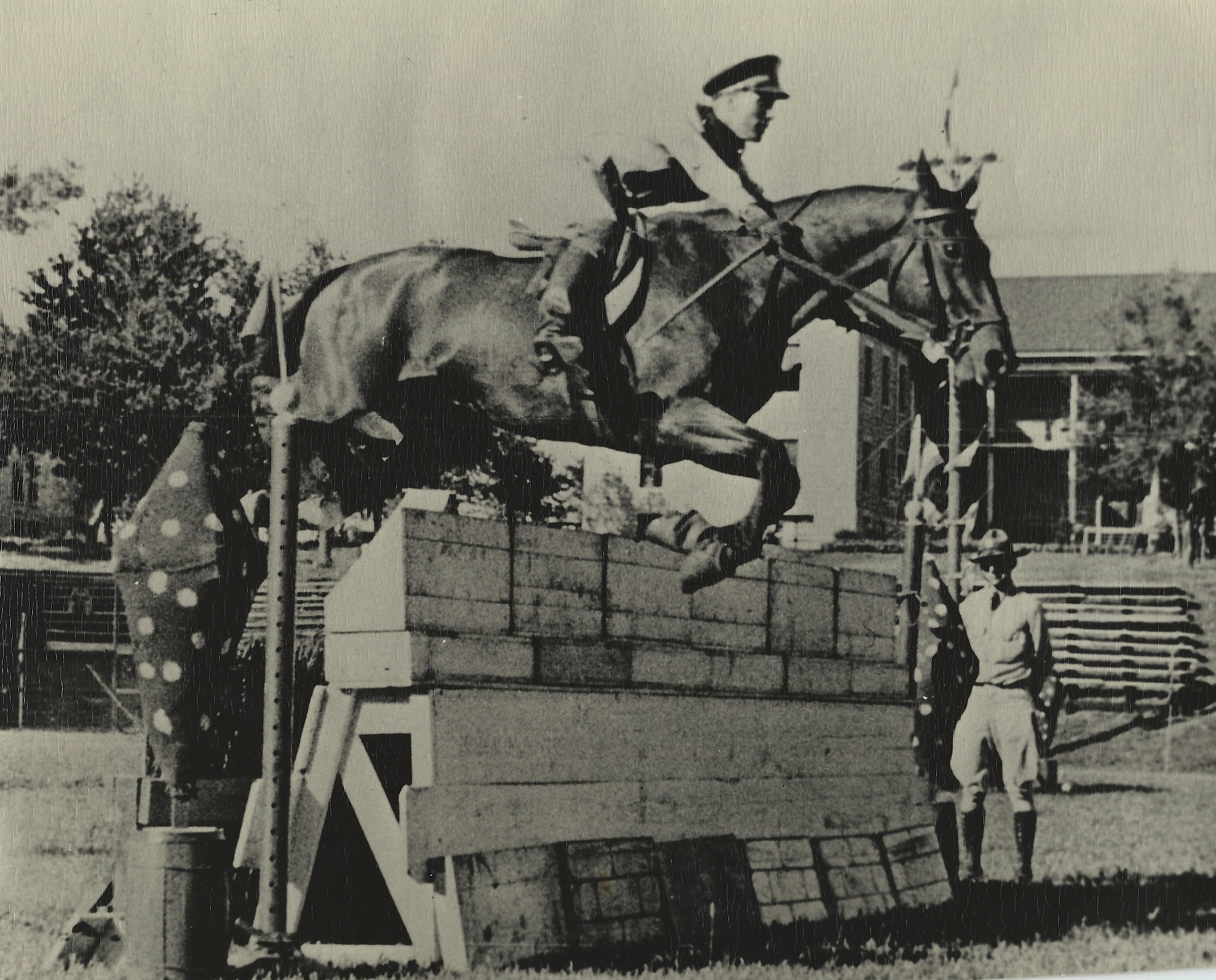
Cairns training on horseback at Fort Riley, ca. 1938, as a lieutenant

After graduating from West Point, then Lt. Cairns was assigned to the cavalry, spending much of the 1930s on horseback at Fort Riley, Kansas. His father was then stationed at Fort Riley when Bugs Cairns attended the Advanced Equitation Course there in 1937–1938. Had it not been for the outbreak of World War II, Cairns would have attended the 1940 Olympic Games, representing the United States as a pentathlete. He had won the National Rifle Association's Leech Cup, at which event he met his future wife, Doris Brougher, daughter of Brigadier General William E. Brougher, while his future father-in-law served as the judge of the event. Brougher was later captured by the Japanese in the Philippines, and felt he had been deserted by Gen. Douglas MacArthur, and he served the remainder of the war as a POW. Both of Cairns' sisters married Army officers, and nearly all are buried with their spouses in the same section of Arlington National Cemetery, Section 11, with their parents.

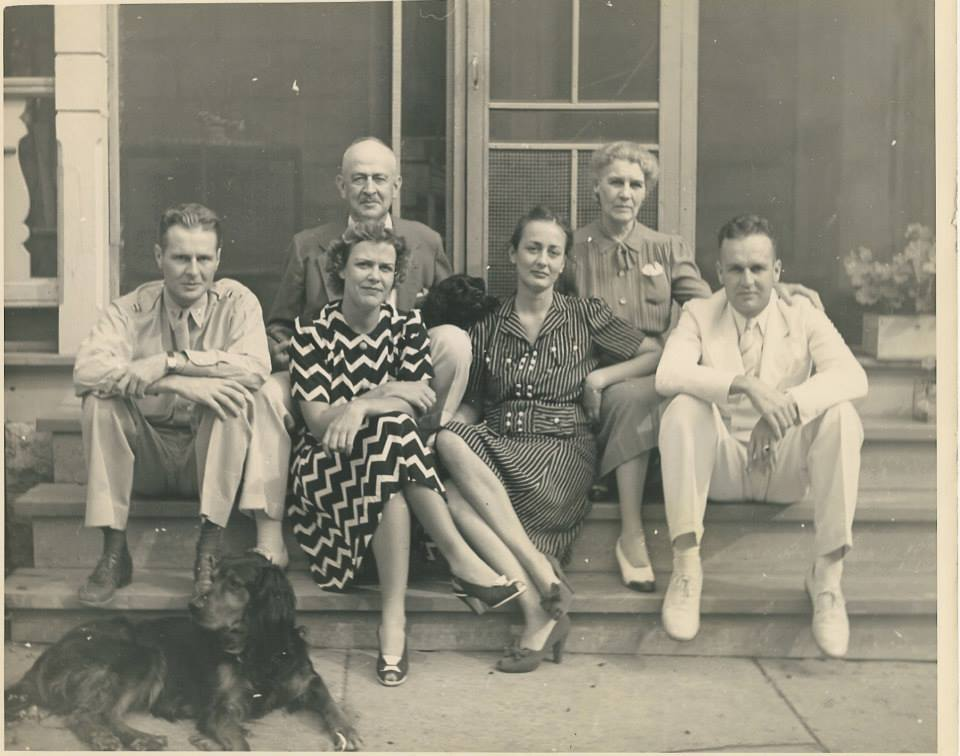
Douglas and Ethel Cairns and their children, from left: Douglas Moore Cairns, Frances Cairns Shupp, Mary Snowden Cairns Tomlinson, and Bogardus Cairns

== World War II ==
After the outbreak of World War II, and following promotion to Lieutenant Colonel, Cairns served as both the Executive Officer and S-3 Operations Officer of the 13th Armored Regiment of the 1st Armored Division under the command of Colonel Paul M. Robinett, serving with Task Force Green as a part of the Center Task Force during Operation Torch, the invasion of North Africa. During the invasion of Oran, Cairns planned and executed the operation, being one of the first to set foot on enemy territory from a landing craft as an example to the men, as recorded by Major Wayne D. Smart in one of Cairns's citations. In the drive into Tunisia, Colonel Robinett became Major General Lunsford E. Oliver's deputy commander of Combat Command B, Center Task Force, and the staff of the 13th became Oliver's staff, keeping Cairns as the Executive Officer/S3 for all of Combat Command B. When Robinett took command of Combat Command B, there was no change, leaving Cairns as the Executive Officer during the successful repulse of a German force during the Battle of Kasserine Pass near Sbeitla, about which Field Marshall Erwin Rommel afterward remarked that it had been "clever and well fought." It was during this time that Cairns fought alongside future four star General Hamilton Howze, at the time the G3 of General Orlando Ward.

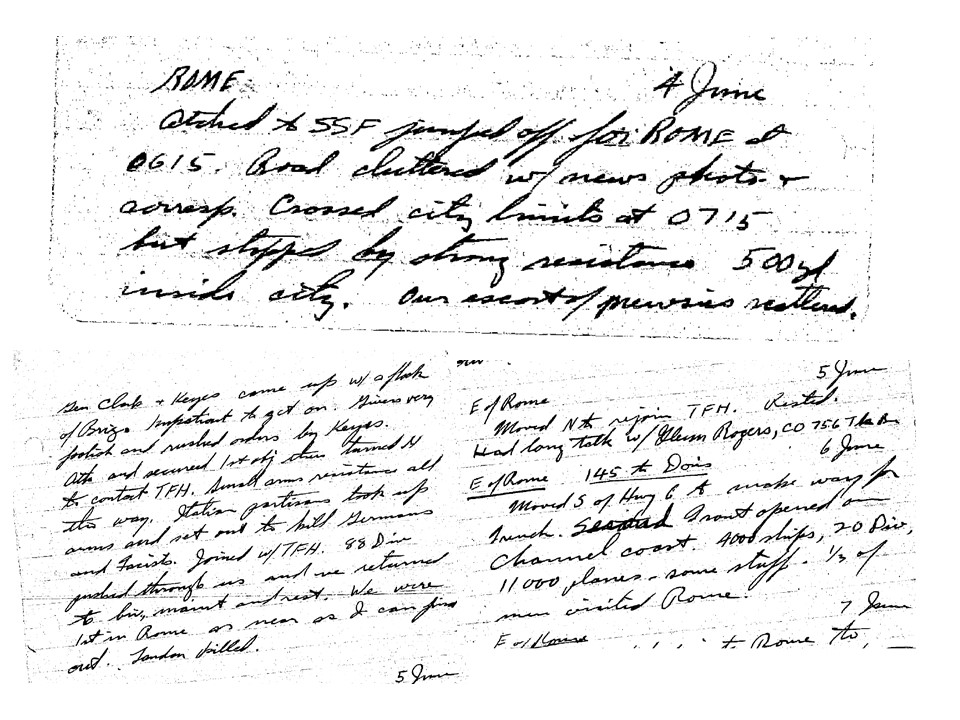
Cairns' WWII battlefield diary said his command was the first to enter Rome, June 4, 1944.

As a part of Combat Command B, Cairns was later involved in the breakout from Anzio and the advance toward Rome under the command of then Colonel Ham Howze. The Howze Task Force, under the 5th Army's Command, Gen. Mark W. Clark, was the first into Rome, specifically Companies A and H of the 3rd Battalion, 13th Armored Regiment now commanded by Cairns. According to both The Battle History of the 1st Armored Division by George F. Howe, and the Cairns' battlefield diary, ' command was the first into Rome, and Gens. Clark and Keyes drove up to Cairns' position, eager to press the attack. Gen. Clark approved of Cairns' disposition and plan, but left Gen. Keyes with Cairns' battalion, "who urged another attempt at the enemy roadblock" while Gen. Clark urged "speedy occupation of the bridges in Rome." The units south of Rome did not encounter the stiff resistance that Cairns' 3rd Battalion encountered in the east, but they nevertheless entered at approximately the same time, with Cairns being the first.

For his part in the North African and Italian Campaigns, Cairns was awarded the Legion of Merit for his service as Executive and Operations Officer of the Thirteenth Armored Regiment and Combat Command B, First Armored Division, from February 1942 to May 1943. The citation reads: "during this period, Lieutenant Colonel Cairns exhibited exemplary judgment and foresight in the planning and in the execution of the movement of the regiment to the European Theater of Operations and subsequently to North Africa. Throughout the African Campaign, from Merse Bou Zedjar to the capture of Mateur and the advance to the sea, he continued his meritorious service, assisting in the successful planning of the movement in Tunisia, and of operations in the Medjez el Bab-Tebourba area, in the Ousseltia Valley, at Sbeitla, in the recapture of Kasserine Pass, at Maknassey, and at Mateur. His outstanding ability in performing all missions assigned reflected the greatest credit upon himself and the armed forces of the United States."

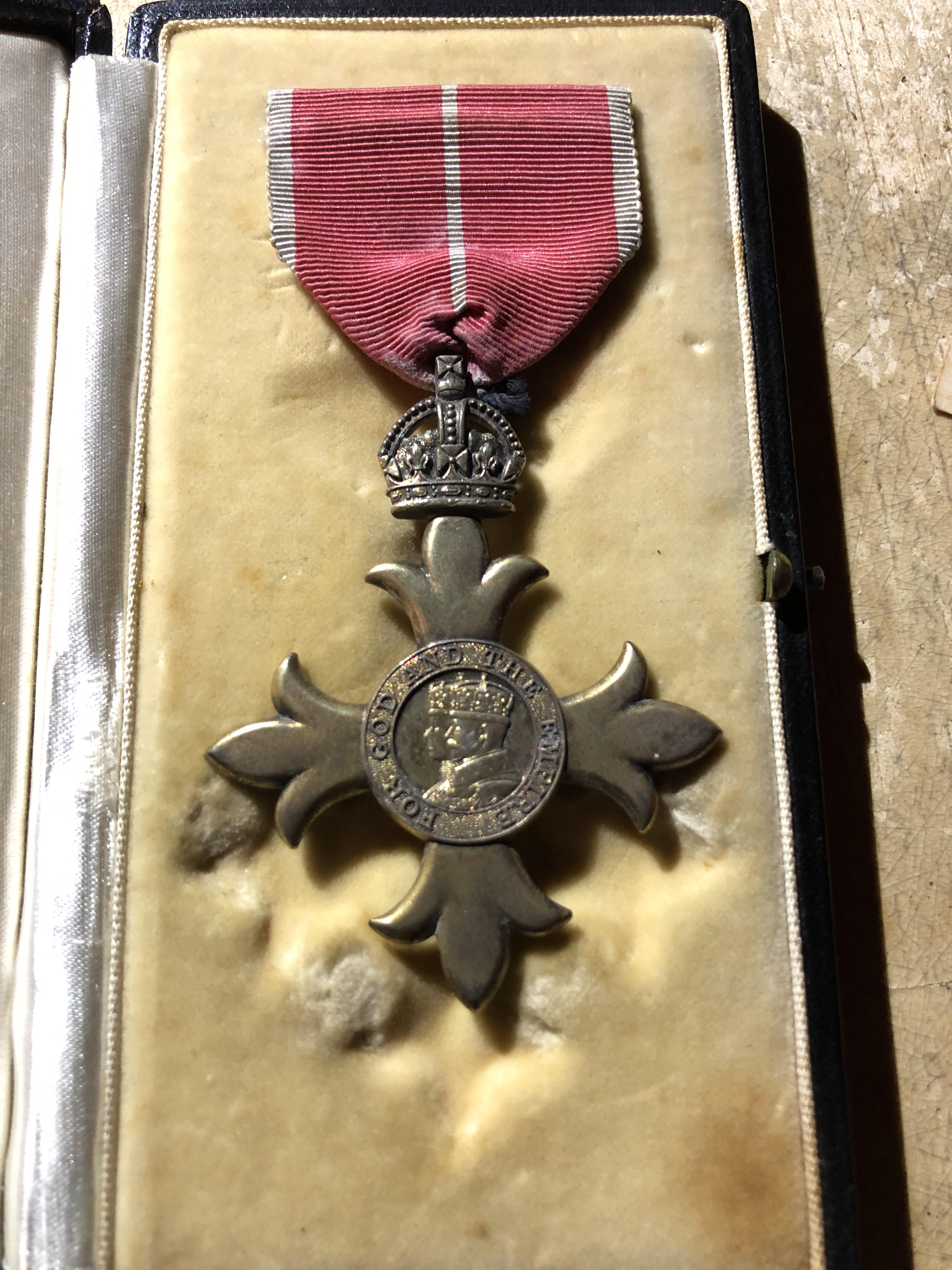
The OBE Cairns received in 1943

He was awarded the Bronze Star for the invasion of North Africa; he was awarded the French Croix de Guerre in 1943 for his role in the invasion. He received a military award of the Order of the British Empire on May 7, 1943, for his role as a Lt. Colonel in North Africa as the XO/S3 of the 13th Armored Regiment, Combat Command B, 1st Armored Division, Center Task Force in the Invasion of North Africa.. He was awarded his first Oak Leaf Cluster for gallantry during the liberation of Rome, May 24-June 4, 1944, and he was awarded his second Oak Leaf Cluster for gallantry during the pursuit of the enemy following the liberation of Rome, June 20 to July 1, 1944.

== Post War ==
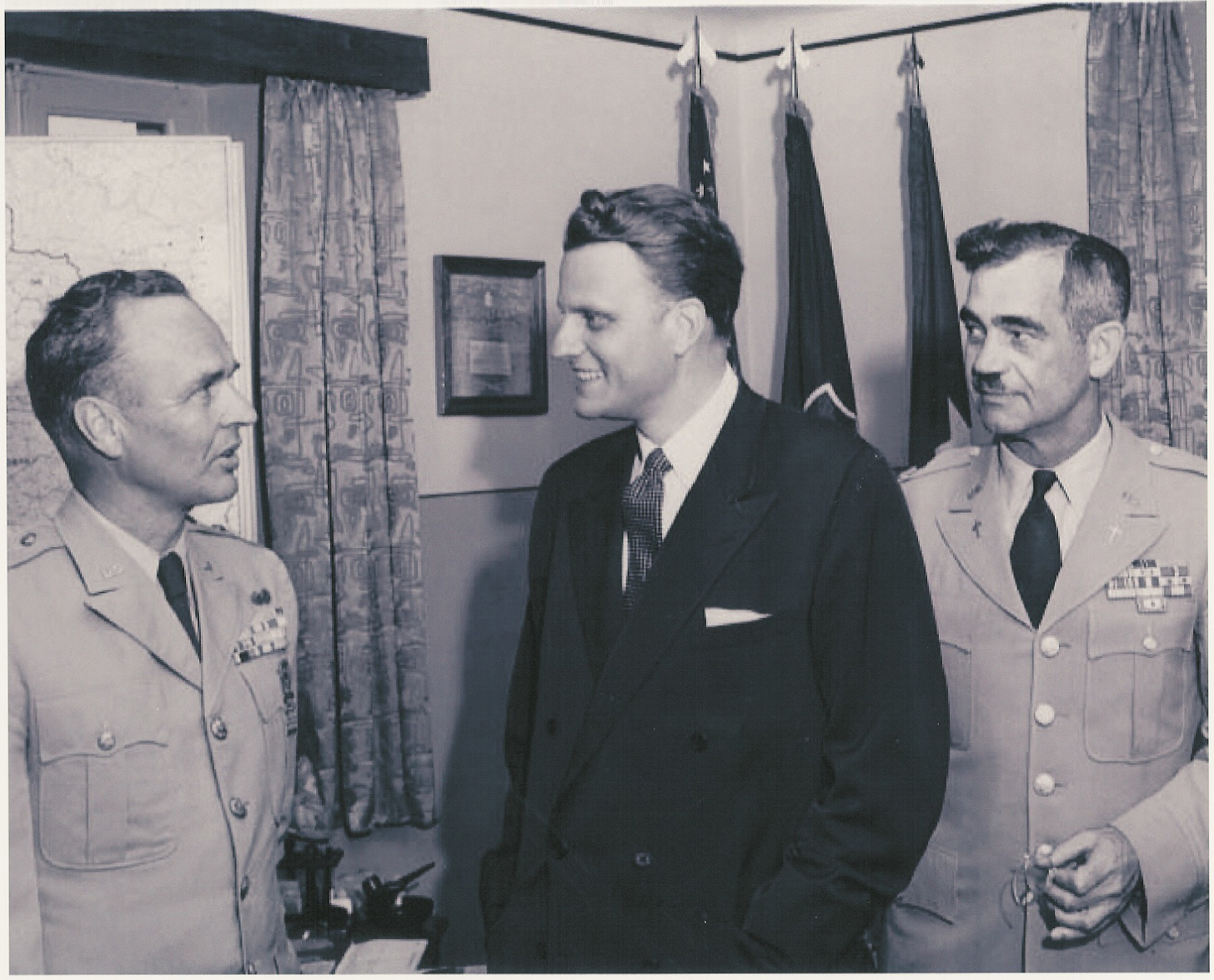
General Bogardus Snowden Cairns and his chaplain meet with Billy Graham, ca. 1955

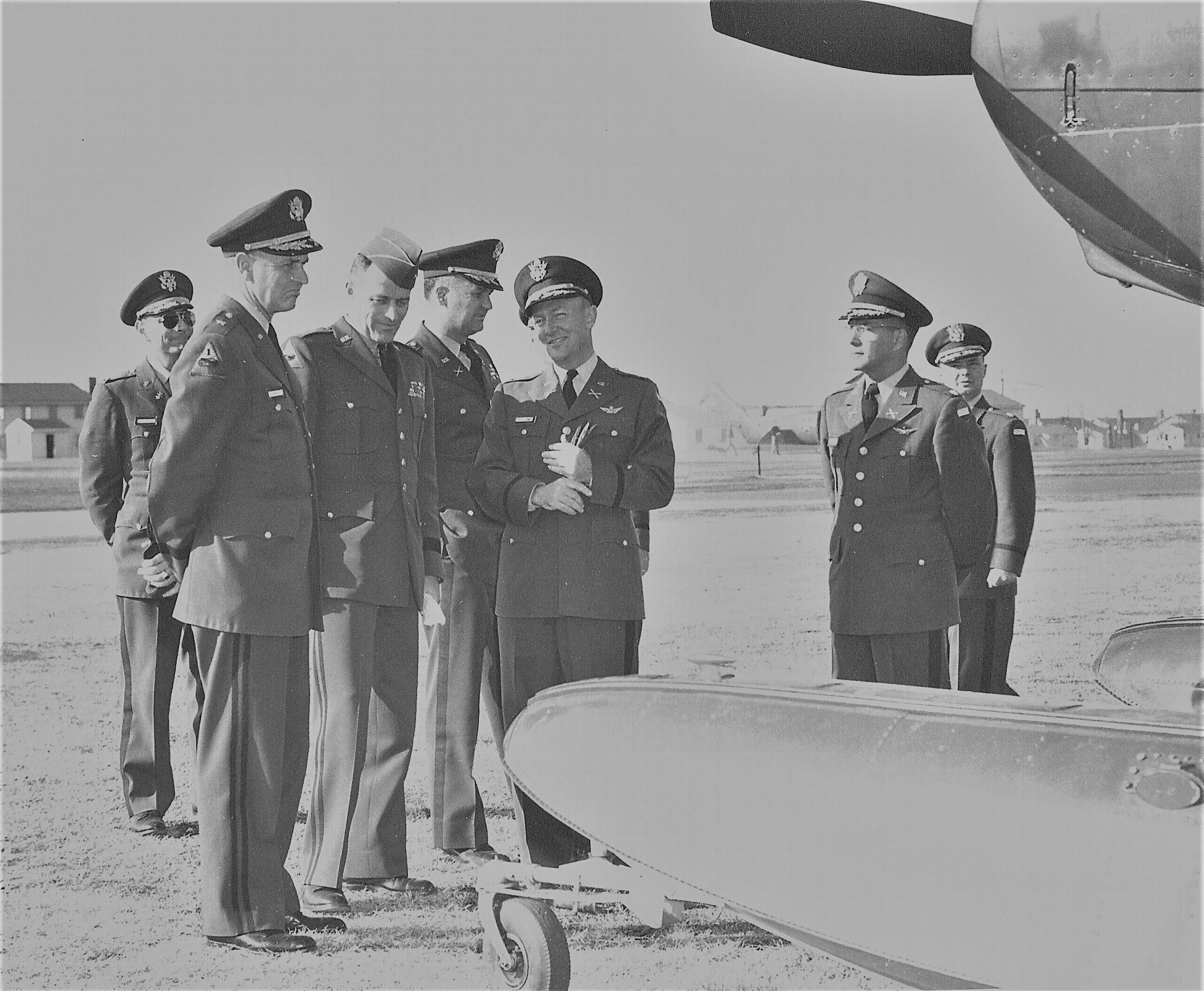
MG Cairns and Gen Hamilton Howze at Fort Rucker discuss the potential of Army aviation.

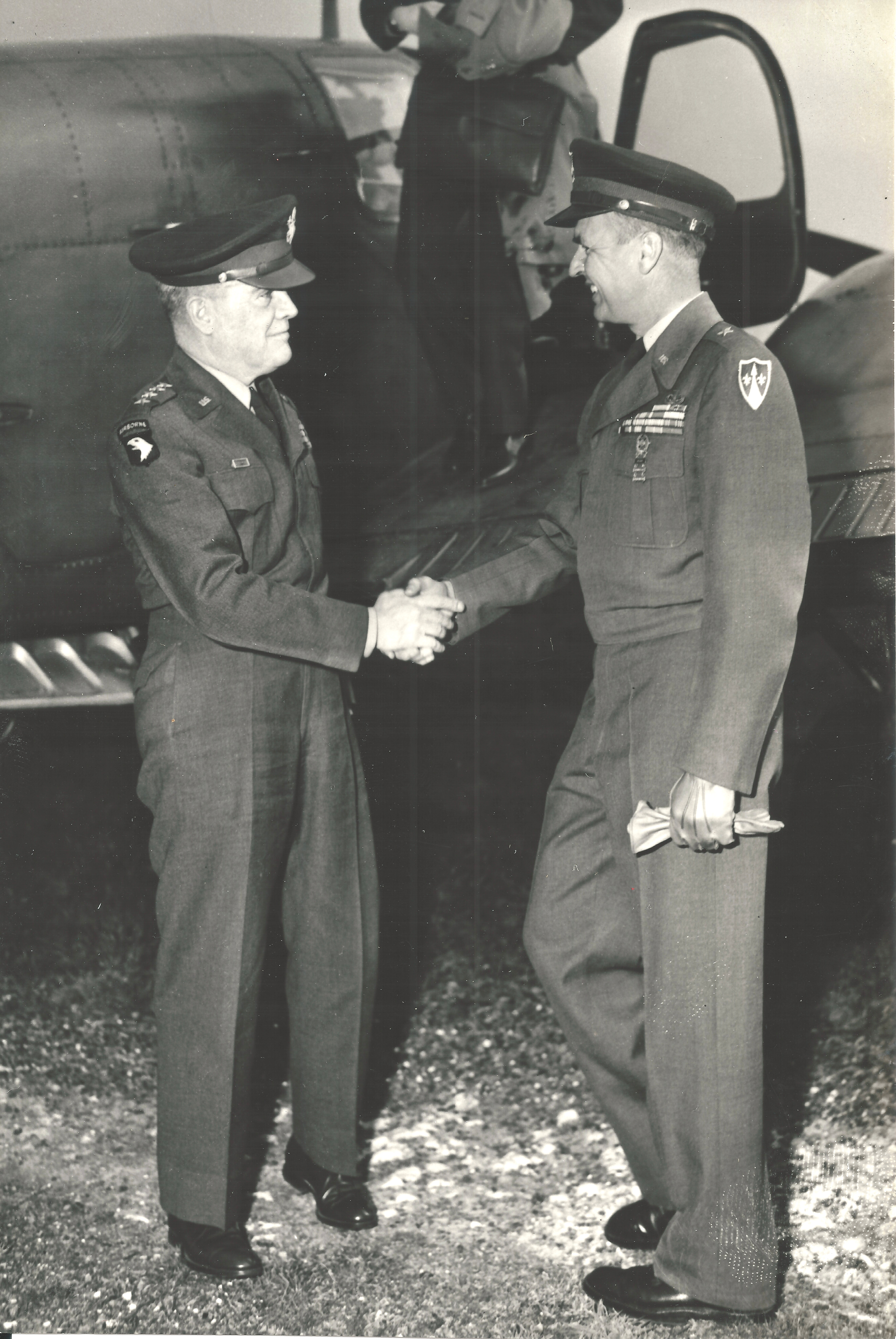
Brigadier General Bogardus S. Cairns greets General Anthony C. MacAuliffe -- La Rochelle, France -- 29 Mar 1955.

Following Gen. Hamilton Howze's association with the newly emerging field of post-war Army Aviation after the creation of the Air Force, he immediately drew on his trust in one of his former lieutenants. Cairns, now a Brigadier General, was commanding Base Section, COMZ, in La Rochelle, France of U.S. Army Europe, then under the command of Gen. Anthony McAuliffe, when Gen. Howze called upon him to be the 2nd Commandant of the U.S. Army Aviation School and Commanding General at the new home of Army Aviation: Fort Rucker, Alabama. While there, Cairns became the first to apply cavalry doctrine to the Armed helicopter: "As an old cavalry officer, Cairns possessed a 1936 cavalry manual, and offered it as a possible guide. It turned out to be a perfect aid to selling the concept. 'We knew what we wanted to do, but [Cairns] also knew that it would be more convincing . . . when put in words that old cavalrymen could understand. Therefore, we took the 1936 yellowback cavalry manual and went from horses to tanks to trucks. We took the horse cavalry portion of it, and substituted helicopters for horses, using the same language, the same terminology. It was well received. Older soldiers, I mean two, three and four star generals, could understand the language of their day, of the late ’30s."

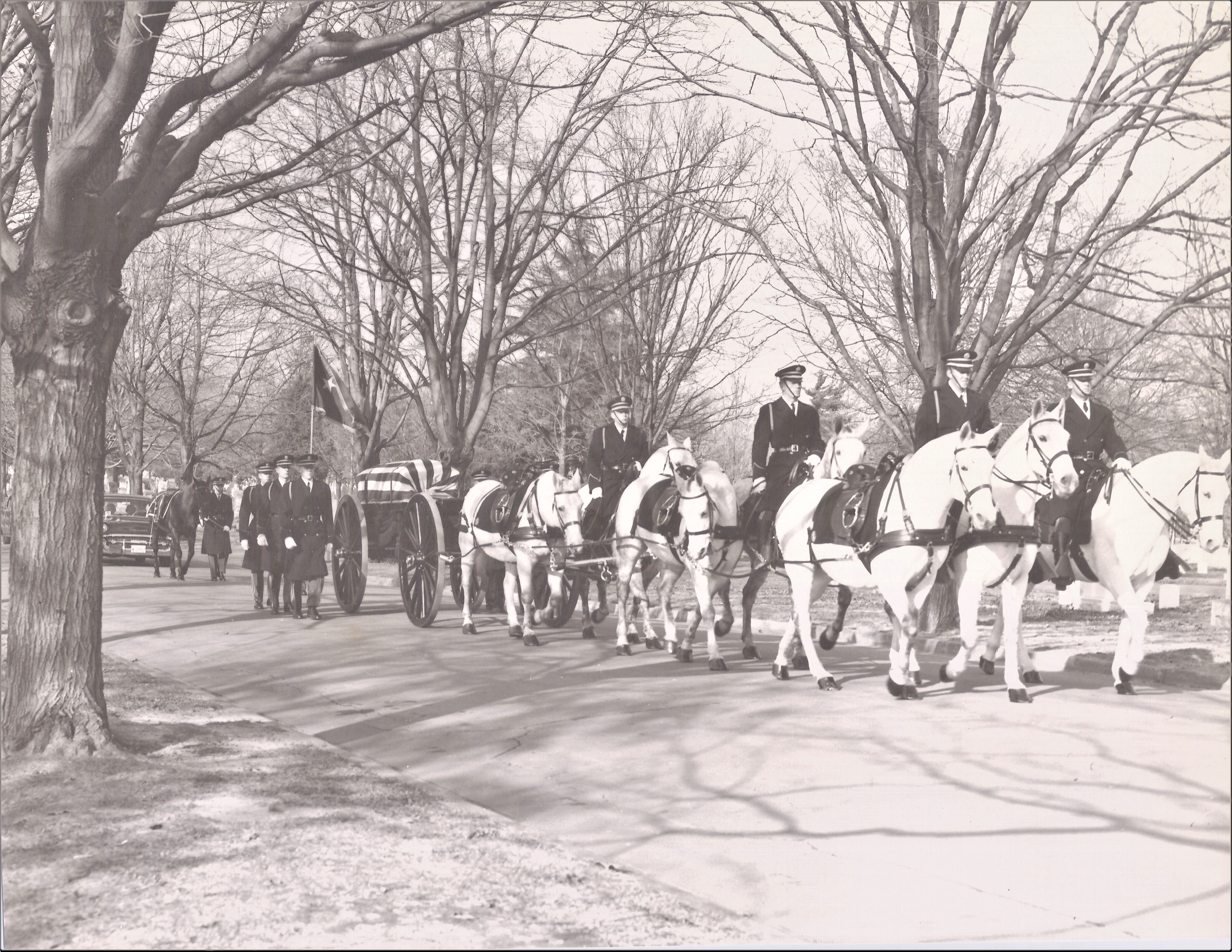
Arlington Caisson at MG Bogardus S. Cairns funeral

Just as he was truly hitting the stride of his career, having changed fighting platforms from horses, to tanks, to helicopters in the span of fewer than three decades, MG Cairns was killed immediately after take-off while flying solo in his Bell H-13 Sioux helicopter to view a firepower demonstration. Although erroneously reported to have been due to carburetor icing in W.E.B. Griffin's The Majors, a fiction perpetuated to this day, he had in fact hit a wire that had been hung unmarked between two trees. He died instantly, cutting short a brilliant military career. He was only 48 years old. Credit for the development of Air Cavalry would posthumously go to others, especially to his old World War II commander, Gen. Hamilton Howze—who chaired the Howze Board, also known as the Tactical Mobility Requirements Board, commissioned by then Secretary of Defense Robert McNamara—credit for which Cairns would not have begrudged him—they had known each other since 1928 at West Point.
