= KOZR =

KOZR may refer to:

- KOZR-LP, a low-power radio station (102.9 FM) licensed to serve Gentry, Arkansas, United States
- the ICAO code for Cairns Army Airfield
