= Hamilton Howze =

United States Army general (1908–1998)

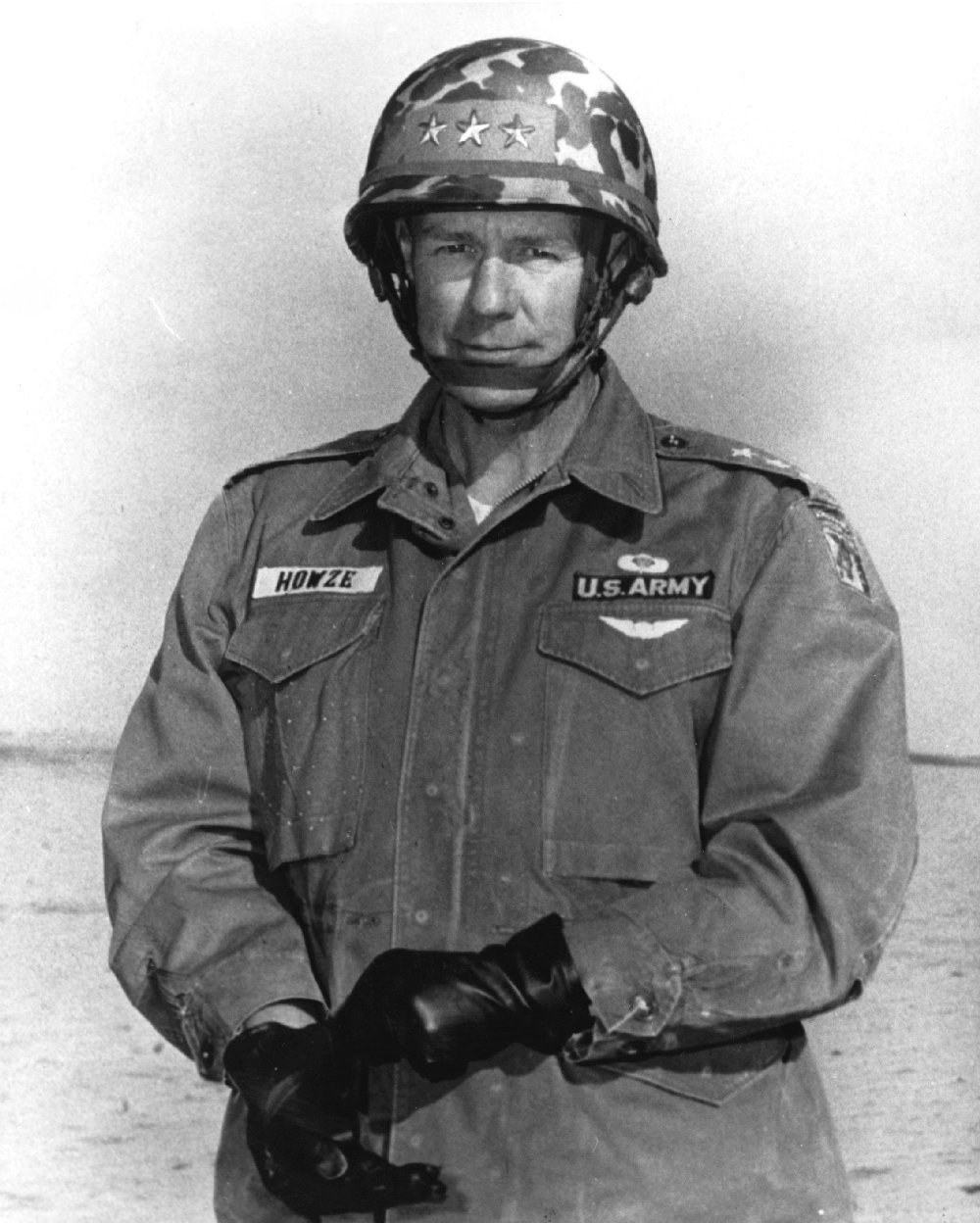
- Howze in 1962
- Born: Hamilton Hawkins Howze; 21 December 1908; West Point, New York, U.S.
- Died: 8 December 1998 (aged 89); Fort Worth, Texas, U.S.
- Burial place: United States Military Academy Post Cemetery
- Relatives: Major General Hamilton Smith Hawkins (grandfather); Major General Robert Lee Howze (father); Major General Robert Lee Howze Jr. (brother); Brigadier General Hamilton S. Hawkins III (uncle)
- Military career
- Allegiance: United States
- Branch: United States Army
- Service years: 1930–1965
- Rank: General
- Commands: Eighth United States Army; Third United States Army; XVIII Airborne Corps; 82d Airborne Division
- Conflicts: World War II
- Awards: Army Distinguished Service Medal; Silver Star; Legion of Merit; Bronze Star Medal

Hamilton Hawkins Howze (21 December 1908 – 8 December 1998) was a general in the United States Army. He was a developer and advocate of helicopter-borne air mobility warfare.

== Early life ==
Howze was born on 21 December 1908, in West Point, New York, while his father, Major General Robert Lee Howze, an 1888 West Point graduate, was serving as Commandant of the United States Military Academy.

== Early career ==
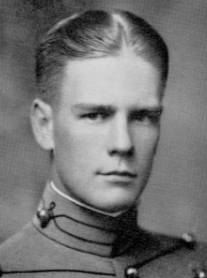
As a West Point cadet

Howze attended West Point, graduating in the Class of 1930. He was commissioned into the 6th Cavalry.

In World War II Howze served as Operations Officer of the 1st Armored Division, then as the commander of: 2nd Battalion, 13th Armor Regiment (1943); 13th Armor Regiment (1943–44); 1st Armored Division, Italy (1944–45). Three years later he attended the National War College, which was followed by an assignment in the office of the G-2 from 1949 to 1952. After promotion to brigadier general in 1952 he became Assistant Commanding General, 2nd Armored Division, European Command, until 1954.

== Air Mobile ==
Howze is recognized as the intellectual force behind the concept of air-mobility and current United States Army Aviation doctrine. While serving as the first Director of Army Aviation, Department of the Army, from 1955 to 1958, he developed new tactical principles for the employment of Army Aviation, and was instrumental in helping the Aviation Center and School become fully established in its new home at Fort Rucker, Alabama. He then became Commanding General of the 82d Airborne Division.

In 1961, as Chairman of the Tactical Mobility Requirements Board, Howze led the development in airmobile theory and doctrine. The army's adoption of the recommendations in the Howze Board changed US mobile warfare. Its revolutionary concepts – based on the use of aviation – changed American military attitudes in a similar manner to the way the tank affected ideas on mobility 50 years earlier. Two years later the 11th Air Assault Division was formed to test and validate these concepts. As a result of Howze's leadership, foresight and perception, two airmobile divisions, the 1st Cavalry Division (Airmobile) and the 101st Airborne Division (Airmobile), were eventually established. These divisions, which adhered to the fundamentals of Howze's airmobility doctrine, went on to provide mobile and combined arms capabilities that are required in today's ground combat conditions.

Howze is credited with starting the convention of naming United States Army helicopter types after Native American tribes, because he found the names suggested by the manufacturers too insipid. The Bell H-13, which had already been in service for some years, was renamed "Sioux" at his suggestion and the tradition continues to the present day.

== Final commands ==
Howze served as the commander of the XVIII Airborne Corps from 1961 to 1962, and briefly acting Commanding General, Third United States Army from 1962 to 1963. In October 1962, he assumed command of the armed forces deployed to support the enrolment of James Meredith at the segregated University of Mississippi.

Howze's last assignment was as Commanding General, Eighth United States Army, Commander-in-Chief of United States Forces in Korea, a four-star United Nations Command position involving United States and Republic of Korea Army troops, from 1963 to 1965. General Howze retired from active duty in 1965 to Fort Worth, Texas.

== Retirement and legacy ==
Howze remained active after leaving the army and became an executive and consultant for Bell Helicopter in Fort Worth. As a 1957 Charter Member of the Army Aviation Association of America (AAAA), he served for four years as the organization's Senior Vice President and President. He was also a member of the Army Aviation Hall of Fame and was the Chairman of the AAAA's board of trustees.

Howze died on 8 December 1998, at age 89. He was buried next to his father at the United States Military Academy Post Cemetery.

The Howze Gunnery Award is presented by the AAAA and is sponsored by Rockwell International Corporation (in the memory of General Hamilton H. Howze), and is presented annually to the top AH-1 & AH-64 crew in the annual GEN Hamilton H. Howze Gunnery Competition.

== Awards and decorations ==
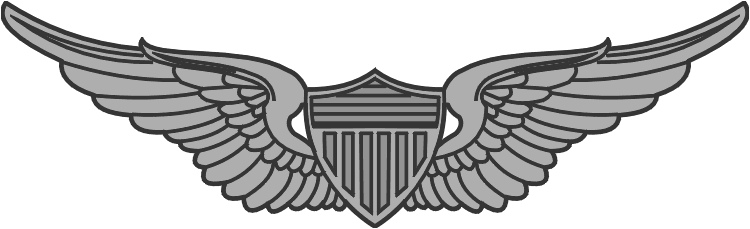
Army Aviator Badge
Airborne badge
Army Distinguished Service Medal
Silver Star
Legion of Merit
Bronze Star Medal with Valor Device
Italian Military Valor Cross
South Korean Tong-il Medal (1st Class)

1962 AHS International Vertical Flight Society "Honorary Fellow"
1974 Army Aviation Association of America Hall of Fame inductee

== Popular culture ==
General Howze was represented in a fictional account of W. E. B. Griffin's "Brotherhood of War" series of books as General "Triple H" Howard.

== Notes ==
Military offices
Preceded by John W. Bowen	Commanding General of the 82nd Airborne Division; 1958–1959	Succeeded by Dwight E. Beach
Preceded by Thomas J. H. Trapnell	Commanding General of the XVIII Airborne Corps; 1961–1962	Succeeded by William Westmoreland
Preceded by Thomas J. H. Trapnell	Commanding General of the Third United States Army (acting); 1962–1963	Succeeded by Albert Watson II
Preceded by Bruce Palmer Jr.	Command General of the Eighth United States Army; 1963–1965	Succeeded by Dwight E. Beach
