= Hanchey Army Heliport =

United States Army heliport

Hanchey Army Heliport (AHP) Fort Rucker
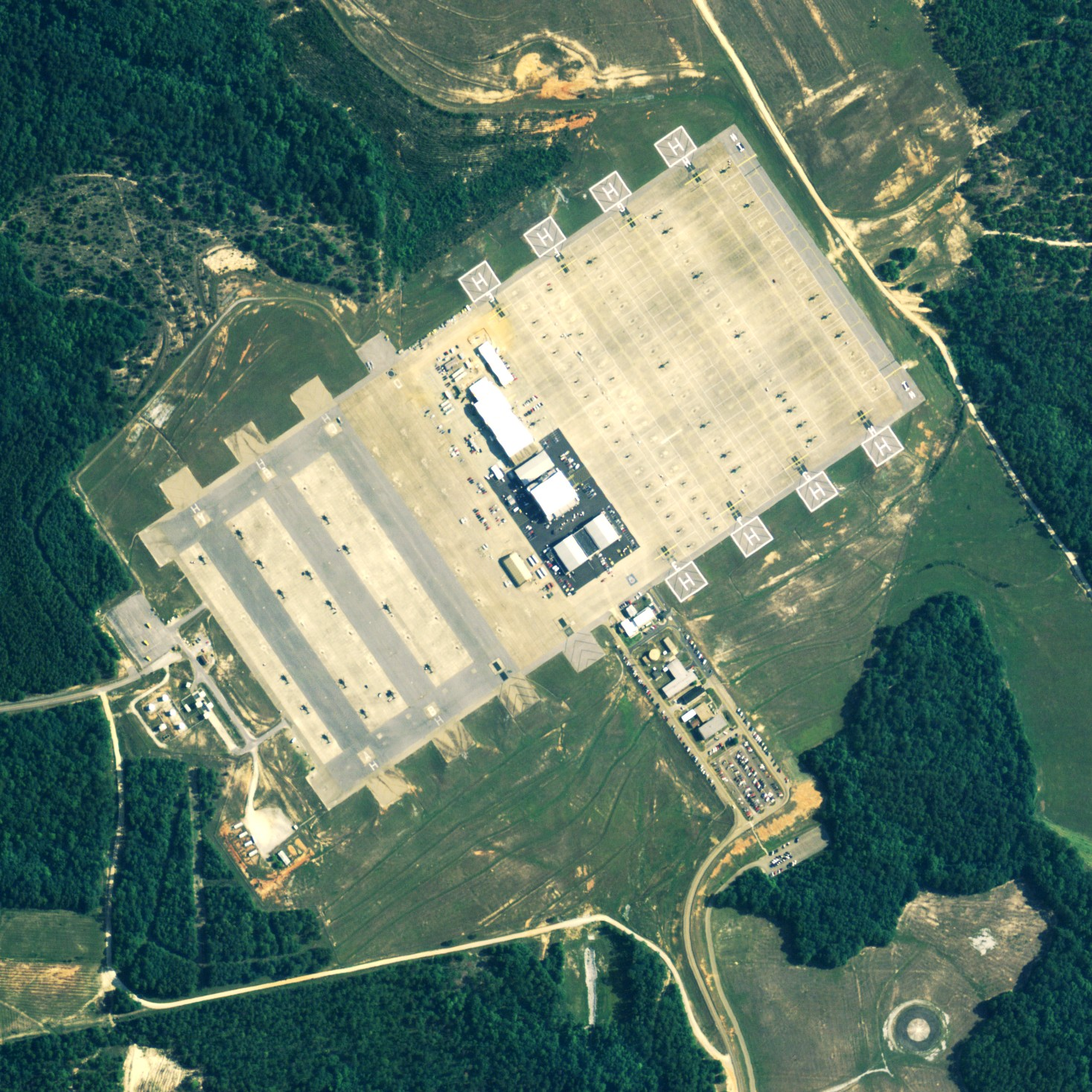
- NAIP aerial image, 15 June 2006
- IATA: HEY; ICAO: KHEY; FAA LID: HEY

Summary
- Airport type: Military
- Owner: United States Army
- Location: Fort Rucker / Ozark, Alabama
- Elevation AMSL: 317 ft (97 m)
- Coordinates: 31°20′46″N 085°39′16″W
- Website: https://home.army.mil/rucker/index.php https://home.army.mil/rucker/index.php]
- Interactive map of Hanchey Army Heliport (AHP)

Runways
Direction	Length		Surface
Direction	ft	m	Surface
17/35	467	142	Asphalt
- Source: Federal Aviation Administration

Hanchey Army Heliport (IATA: HEY, ICAO: KHEY, FAA LID: HEY) is a military heliport serving Fort Rucker in Dale County, Alabama, United States. Owned by the United States Army, it is located 6 NM (11 km) south of the city of Ozark.

== Facilities ==
Hanchey AHP has one runway designated 17/35 with an asphalt surface measuring 467 by 50 feet (142 x 15 m).

== See also ==
- Fort Rucker, located at 31°20′37″N 85°42′29″W
- Cairns Army Airfield, located at 31°16′33″N 085°42′48″W
- Lowe Army Heliport, located at 31°21′21″N 085°45′04″W
