= Lowe Army Heliport =

Lowe Army Heliport (AHP) Fort Rucker
- IATA: LOR; ICAO: KLOR; FAA LID: LOR

Summary
- Airport type: Military
- Owner: U.S. Army
- Location: Fort Rucker / Dale County, Alabama
- Elevation AMSL: 294 ft / 90 m
- Coordinates: 31°21′21″N 085°45′04″W
- Website: https://home.army.mil/rucker/index.php/
- Interactive map of Lowe Army Heliport (AHP)

Runways
Direction	Length		Surface
Direction	ft	m	Surface
6L/24R	2,000	610	Asphalt
6R/24L	2,000	610	Asphalt
18L/36R	2,000	610	Asphalt
18R/36L	2,000	610	Asphalt
- Source: Federal Aviation Administration

Lowe Army Heliport (IATA: LOR, ICAO: KLOR, FAA LID: LOR) is a military heliport serving Fort Rucker in Dale County, Alabama, United States. Owned by the United States Army, it is located 8 nautical miles (15 km) southwest of the city of Ozark.

Lowe AHP is an Army heliport with no active runways, but has several helipads A, B. C, E, G, L, M, N, R, S, V, W.

== Facilities ==
Lowe AHP has four asphalt paved runways designated 6L/24R, 6R/24L, 18L/36R and 18R/36L, each of which measures 2000 by 75 feet (610 x 23 m).

== See also ==
- Fort Rucker, located at 31°20′37″N 85°42′29″W
- Cairns Army Airfield, located at 31°16′33″N 085°42′48″W
- Hanchey Army Heliport, located at 31°20′46″N 085°39′16″W
