= Fort Rucker =

U.S. Army base in Alabama

- Fort Rucker, Alabama
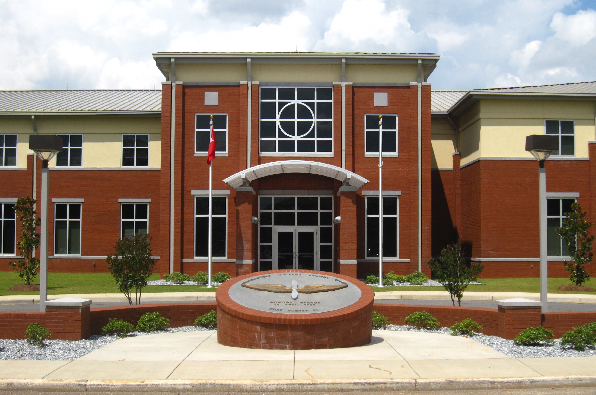

Site information
- Type: Army post
- Controlled by: United States Army
- Open to the public: No (The Army Aviation Museum is open to the public. ID and proof of auto insurance are required to enter the installation.)
- Condition: Operational

Location
- Location within Alabama
- Coordinates: 31°20′15″N 85°42′40″W

Site history
- Built: 1 May 1942
- In use: 1942–present

Garrison information
- Current commander: Major General Clair A. Gill
- Past commanders: Brigadier General Michael D. Lundy Maj. Gen. James O. Barclay III, 2008–2010
- Garrison: 1st Aviation Brigade; 110th Aviation Brigade; 23rd Flying Training Squadron
- Occupants: 1st Aviation Brigade

Fort Rucker (formerly Fort Novosel) is a United States Army post located primarily in Dale County, Alabama, United States. Its name currently honors Captain Edward W. Rucker, a World War I aviator. It was previously named for a Civil War officer, Confederate Colonel Edmund Rucker. The post is the primary flight-training installation for U.S. Army Aviators and is home to the United States Army Aviation Center of Excellence and the United States Army Aviation Museum. Small sections of the post also lie in Coffee, Geneva, and Houston Counties. Part of the Dale County section of the base is a census-designated place; its population was 4,636 at the 2010 census.

The main post has entrances from three bordering cities, Daleville, Ozark, and Enterprise. In the years before the September 11, 2001 attacks, the main post (except airfields and other restricted areas) was an open post with unmanned gates allowing civilians to drive through. Following the attacks, this policy was changed, and the post is now closed to unauthorized traffic and visitors.

It was one of the U.S. Army installations named for Confederate soldiers that was recommended for renaming by the Naming Commission. Their recommendation was that the post be renamed Fort Novosel. On 5 January 2023, William A. LaPlante, U.S. undersecretary of defense for acquisition and sustainment) directed the full implementation of the recommendations of the Naming Commission, DoD-wide. The post was redesignated Fort Novosel on 10 April 2023, in honor of Chief Warrant Officer Michael J. Novosel, an Army aviator and Medal of Honor recipient. An order by President Donald Trump in June 2025 announced plans to rename the base again, and it was officially redesignated Fort Rucker, with a different namesake, on 11 June 2025.

== Military facilities ==
Coordinates:
- Fort Rucker: 31°20′12.29″N 85°42′41.53″W
- Cairns Army Airfield: 31°16′37.77″N 85°42′47.27″W
- Hanchey Army Heliport: 31°20′37.62″N 85°39′11.88″W
- Knox Army Heliport: 31°19′7.65″N 85°40′25.16″W
- Lowe Army Heliport: 31°21′17.63″N 85°44′55.35″W
- Shell Army Heliport: 31°21′45.14″N 85°50′56.09″W
- Echo Army Heliport: 31°23′33.00″N 85°45′8.96″W

The U.S. Army Aviation Center of Excellence is the dominant military facility at Fort Rucker. Training, doctrine, and testing are all key parts of the center's mission to develop Army Aviation's capabilities. All Army Aviation training has been undertaken at Fort Rucker since 1973, as well as training of United States Air Force (USAF) and ally helicopter pilots and air crew. The center was home to the U.S. Army Aviation Technical Test Center (ATTC), which conducts developmental aircraft testing for Army Aviation. In 2005, as part of the Base Realignment and Closure (BRAC) decision, ATTC was moved north to Redstone Arsenal, Alabama, and combined with the Redstone Technical Test Center to form the Redstone Test Center. The United States Army Operational Test and Evaluation Command's Test and Evaluation Coordination Office and TH-67 Creek primary and instrument training are both located at Cairns Army Airfield. The last TH-67 was retired in 2021, as the Army moved to the Eurocopter UH-72 Lakota as its trainer aircraft.

Operational units on the post include the 1st Aviation Brigade and the 110th Aviation Brigade handling Army Aviation training, and the USAF 23d Flying Training Squadron for the training of Air Force helicopter pilots and air crew.

The 110th Aviation Brigade consists of four battalions using three different sites. First Battalion, 11th Aviation Regiment, operates and manages air traffic control services for USAACe/Fort Rucker and the National Airspace System. First Battalion, 13th Aviation Regiment trains future air traffic controllers and aviation operations specialists who have recently graduated basic training or are transferring from another military occupational specialty. 1st Battalion, 14th Aviation Regiment operates from Hanchey Army Heliport and conducts graduate level training using the AH-64E Apache Longbow helicopters. 1st Battalion, 212th Aviation Regiment operates from Lowe Army Heliport and Shell Army Heliport and conducts combat and night operational training, using the UH-60 Black Hawk helicopters. First Battalion, 223d Aviation Regiment operates from Cairns Army Airfield and Shell Army Heliport flying the Eurocopter UH-72 Lakota for introductory helicopter pilot training, and Knox Army Heliport for training pilots who fly the CH-47 Chinook helicopter.

Additionally, due to the large number of warrant officers stationed there, the Warrant Officer Candidate School and Warrant Officer Career College are both located at Fort Rucker. Aviation-branched warrant officers remain at Fort Rucker to complete flight training and the aviation Warrant Officer Basic Course. Upon completion of their training, aviation warrant officers receive the Army Aviator badge.

Support and other facilities at Fort Rucker include the Lyster Army Health Clinic, United States Army Aeromedical Research Lab, United States Army School of Aviation Medicine, United States Army Combat Readiness/Safety Center, and Army Aviation Museum.

== History ==
The original name of the post was Ozark Triangular Division Camp, but before the camp was officially opened during World War II on 1 May 1942, the War Department named it Camp Rucker. The post was named in honor of Colonel Edmund W. Rucker, a Civil War Confederate officer, who was given the honorary title of "General" and who became an industrial leader in Birmingham after the war. Fort Rucker (situated on 58,000 acres (235 km^{2}) of submarginal farmland and formerly a wildlife refuge) was opened on 1 May 1942 as "Camp Rucker". It had quarters for 3,280 officers and 39,461 enlisted personnel.

In September 1942, 1,259 additional acres south of Daleville were acquired to construct an airfield to support the training camp. It was known as Ozark Army Airfield until January 1959, when the name was changed to Cairns Army Airfield. The first troops to train at Camp Rucker were those of the 81st Infantry Division; the 81st Division left Rucker for action in the Pacific Theater in March 1943. Three other infantry divisions received training at Camp Rucker during the war—the 35th, the 98th, and the 66th. The 66th (Panther) Division was the last division to train at the post during WW II, and it left for the European Theater in October 1944.

Camp Rucker was also used to train dozens of units of less-than-division size; these included tank, infantry replacement, and Women's Army Corps units. During the latter part of World War II, several hundred German and a few Italian prisoners of war were housed in stockades near the railroad east of the warehouse area, on the southern edge of the post. The 91st Infantry Division was sent to Camp Rucker at the war's end, inactivating in December 1945.

Camp Rucker was inactive from March 1946 until August 1950. It was reopened during the Korean War. The Minnesota Army National Guard's 47th Infantry Division was mobilized and sent to Camp Rucker in the fall of 1950; the division provided cadre that would conduct basic training of soldiers, who would later on be sent as replacements to units in Korea. The 47th Infantry Division remained at Camp Rucker throughout the war. After another short deactivation, it reopened and expanded when it became a helicopter pilot training base. The name was changed to "Fort Rucker" in October 1955.

The Hanchey Army Airfield became the home of the Department of Rotary Wing Training of the Army Aviation School on 5 October 1959, marking the first time the department was centralized.

Fort Rucker suffered damage from three significant tornadoes in 1972 and 1973. The first, rated F2, struck on 13 January 1972. It damaged buildings and helicopters on the post and devastated two nearby trailer parks, killing four people and injuring 88, all army dependents. An F3 tornado struck the post on 29 December 1973, causing minor damage to residences and striking a tank storage area. Most of the significant damage from this storm was in the Enterprise area. A second F3 tornado hit a day later, heavily damaging 30 government and residential buildings at Fort Rucker, five of which were destroyed; 23 people were injured.

=== Renaming ===
The 2021 National Defense Authorization Act calls for the establishment of an eight-person committee to develop a plan to remove all names, symbols, displays, and monuments that honor or commemorate the Confederacy from all then-Department of Defense assets, including the former Fort Rucker. In 2021, the family of Hal Moore started a petition to rename the fort in honor of Benjamin O. Davis Jr., the first black brigadier general in the U.S. Air Force.

The Naming Commission later recommended that the fort be renamed in honor of Chief Warrant Officer Michael J. Novosel, an Army aviator. The post was officially renamed on 10 April 2023. The post was renamed again in June 2025 for Captain Edward W. Rucker, an aviator in World War I.

== Geography ==
Fort Rucker is located at 31°20'37" north, 85°42'29" west (31.343654, -85.707995).

According to the United States Census Bureau, the CDP area of the base has a total area of 10.9 square miles (28.2 km^{2}), of which 0.04 sq mi (0.1 km^{2}) (0.18%) is covered by water.

== Demographics ==
Historical population
Census	Pop.	Note	%±
1970	14,242		—
1980	8,932		−37.3%
1990	7,593		−15.0%
2000	6,052		−20.3%
2010	4,636		−23.4%
2020	4,464		−3.7%
U.S. Decennial Census

=== Racial and ethnic composition ===
Fort Rucker CDP, Alabama – Racial and ethnic composition Note: the US Census treats Hispanic/Latino as an ethnic category. This table excludes Latinos from the racial categories and assigns them to a separate category. Hispanics/Latinos may be of any race.
Race / Ethnicity (NH = Non-Hispanic)	Pop 1980	Pop 1990	Pop 2000	Pop 2010	Pop 2020	% 1980	% 1990	% 2000	% 2010	% 2020
White alone (NH)	6,525	5,358	3,846	3,227	2,964	73.05%	70.56%	63.55%	69.61%	66.40%
Black or African American alone (NH)	1,593	1,390	1,074	523	312	17.83%	18.31%	17.75%	11.28%	6.99%
Native American or Alaska Native alone (NH)	120	45	48	32	23	1.34%	0.59%	0.79%	0.69%	0.52%
Asian alone (NH)	168	202	119	59	139	1.88%	2.66%	1.97%	1.27%	3.11%
Native Hawaiian or Pacific Islander alone (NH)	x	x	41	11	17	x	x	0.68%	0.24%	0.38%
Other race alone (NH)	0	3	26	5	21	0.00%	0.04%	0.43%	0.11%	0.47%
Multiracial (NH)	x	x	191	165	277	x	x	3.16%	3.56%	6.21%
Hispanic or Latino (any race)	526	595	707	614	711	5.89%	7.84%	11.68%	13.24%	15.93%
Total	8,932	7,593	6,052	4,636	4,464	100.00%	100.00%	100.00%	100.00%	100.00%

=== 2000 census ===
As of the 2000 census, 6,052 people, 1,399 households, and 1,347 families resided on the base. The population density was 556.8 inhabitants per square mile (215.0/km^{2}). The 1,544 housing units had an average density of 142.0 per square mile (54.8/km^{2}). The racial makeup of the base was 68.5% White, 18.1% Black or African American, 0.9% Native American, 2.1% Asian, 0.7% Pacific Islander, 5.3% from other races, and 4.4% from two or more races. Hispanic or Latino people of any race were 11.7% of the population.

Of the 1,399 households, 79.9% had children under 18 living with them, 85.4% were married couples living together, 8.2% had a female householder with no husband present, and 3.7% were not families. About 3.1% of all households were made up of individuals, and 0.1% had someone living alone who was 65 or older. The average household size was 3.47, and the average family size was 3.51.

On the base, the age distribution was 35.3% under 18, 15.9% from 18 to 24, 46.2% from 25 to 44, 2.4% from 45 to 64, and 0.1% who were 65 or older. The median age was 24 years. For every 100 females, there were 131.6 males. For every 100 females 18 and over, there were 145.1 males.

The median income on the base for a household was $34,603 and for a family was $33,664. Males had a median income of $29,321 versus $18,750 for females. The per capita income was $14,495. About 6.1% of families and 7.1% of the population were below the poverty line, including 9.3% of those under 18 and 16.7% of those 65 and older.

== Education ==
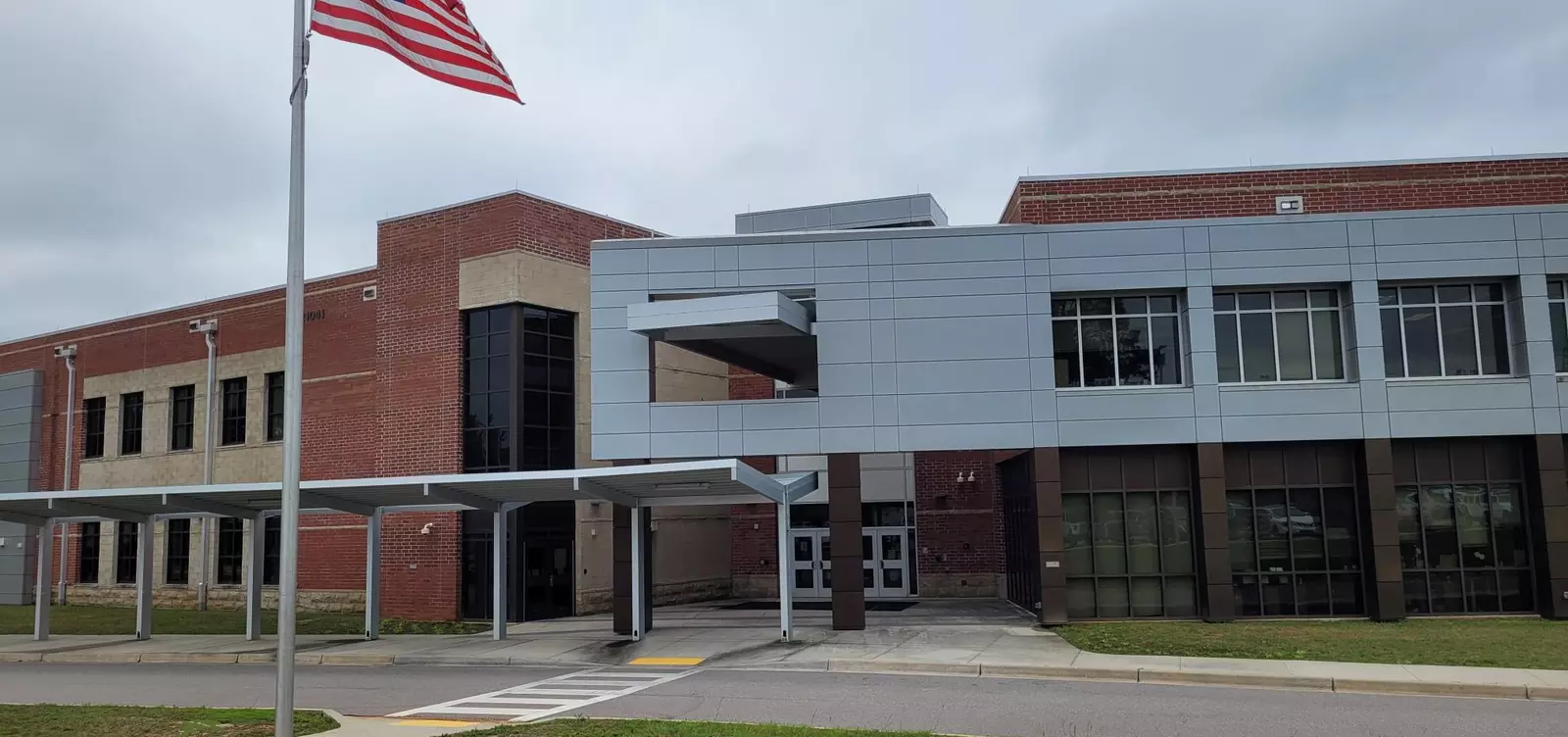
Ellis D. Parker Elementary School

Fort Rucker is in the Department of Defense Education Activity (DoDEA) as its local school district. Ellis D. Parker Elementary School is the on-post school. The school opened in 2020, and is named after Ellis D. Parker. The 2020 building replaced a previous school building. The 2020 facility has three stories.

Students beyond the elementary level may attend non-DoDEA schools for secondary levels, with an on-post family choosing one of these options: Daleville City School System, Enterprise City School System, or Ozark City Schools. Enterprise operates Enterprise High School and Ozark operates Carroll High School.

== Notable people ==
- Leonard Byrd, sprinter
- Paul Cotton, guitarist, singer, and songwriter for Poco
- James Forbes, basketball player
- Mayte Garcia, dancer and singer, ex-wife of Prince
- Brian Gay, professional golfer
- Al Gore, former Vice President of the United States, spent time as a soldier assigned to Fort Rucker
- Rusty Greer, former Major League Baseball outfielder
- James Hong, Army National Guard, Special Services (entertainment) 1952–53
- Edgar Jones, former National Basketball Association player
- Kris Kristofferson, American singer, songwriter, and actor: "After joining the Army, Kristofferson received flight instruction at Fort Rucker, Alabama, and became a helicopter pilot. He also successfully completed one of the military's most physically challenging courses: Ranger School."
- Hal Morris, former Major League Baseball first baseman
- Blake Percival, whistleblower, spent time as a soldier assigned to Fort Rucker
- Jeffrey N. Steenson, prelate of the Roman Catholic Church, currently serves as the first ordinary of the Personal Ordinariate of the Chair of Saint Peter
