= Cairns Army Airfield =

Cairns Army Airfield (AAF) Fort Rucker
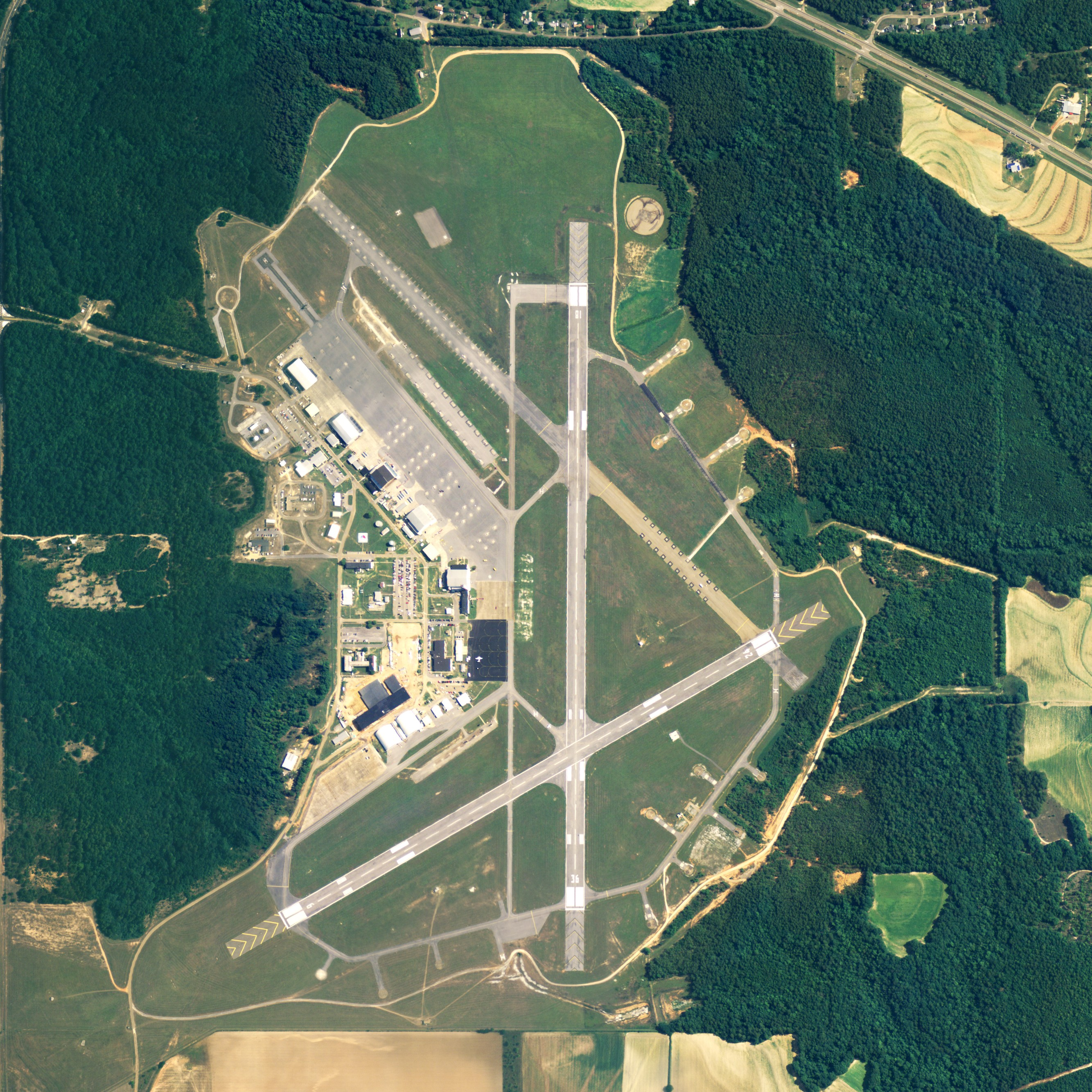
- NAIP aerial image, 30 June 2006

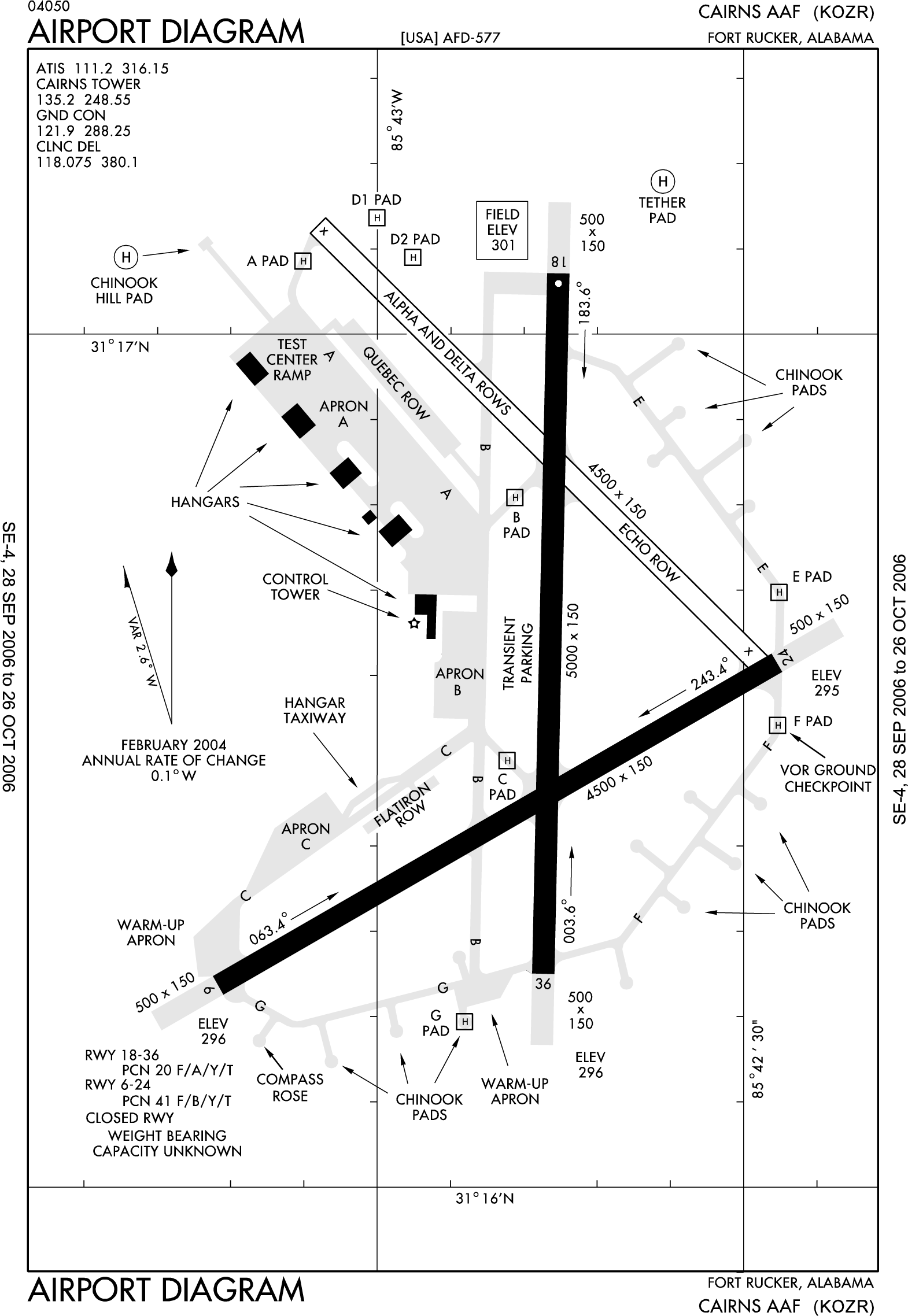
- FAA diagram of runway area
- IATA: OZR; ICAO: KOZR; FAA LID: OZR

Summary
- Airport type: Military
- Owner: U.S. Army
- Location: Fort Rucker / Dale County, Alabama
- Elevation AMSL: 301 ft (92 m)
- Coordinates: 31°16′33″N 085°42′48″W
- Website: home.army.mil/rucker/index.php

Map
- Location of Cairns Army Airfield

Runways
Direction	Length		Surface
Direction	ft	m	Surface
6/24	4,546	1,386	Asphalt
18/36	5,025	1,532	Asphalt
- Source: Federal Aviation Administration

Cairns Army Airfield (IATA: OZR, ICAO: KOZR, FAA LID: OZR) is a military airport forming a part of Fort Rucker, in Dale County, Alabama, USA, and is owned by the United States Army. The airfield is south of the town of Daleville, which sits between it and the main post.

== History ==
In September 1942, 1,259 acres (5.1 km^{2}) south of Daleville were acquired for the construction of an airfield to support the training camp. It was a training airfield as part of the United States Army Air Forces Third Air Force during World War II, then placed on inactive status with the war's end.

Needing a location to shoot all takeoffs and landings for the 1949 film Twelve O'Clock High, including the spectacular B-17 Flying Fortress belly landing sequence early in the film, director Henry King selected Ozark since its dark runways more closely matched wartime bases in England as opposed to the light-colored runways at nearby Eglin Air Force Base, Florida, the primary shoot location. Since the field had been allowed to overgrow during its inactive status, it was also an ideal location for the character Harvey Stovall to post-war reminisce about his World War II service (which is seen at the beginning of the film) before the crew mowed and dressed the field to start the rest of shooting.

Released by the U.S. Air Force as excess, the field was subsequently acquired by the U.S. Army as part of the Fort Rucker complex in 1952. It was known as Ozark Army Air Field until January 1959, when the name was changed to Cairns Army Air Field, named for U.S. Army Major General Bogardus Snowden "Bugs" Cairns, who was killed instantly when his H-13 Sioux helicopter crashed minutes after takeoff in dense woods northwest of Fort Rucker, Alabama, headquarters on 9 December 1958. He was en-route to Matteson Range to observe a firepower rehearsal in preparation for a full-scale armed helicopter display. He was commander of the Aviation Center and Commandant of the Aviation School.

== Current use ==
Fort Rucker is the Home of Army Aviation, where the US Army's aviators as well as many international and civilian personnel begin their helicopter flight training.

Cairns is the busiest airfield in the Army, training large numbers of Army aviators both day and night with an average annual traffic count of approximately 240,000 movements.

In addition, Cairns AAF hosts the 23d Flying Training Squadron, which trains United States Air Force pilots in the TH-1H.

== Facilities ==
Cairns AAF has two asphalt paved runways: 6/24 is 4,546 by 150 feet (1,386 x 46 m) and 18/36 is 5,025 by 150 feet (1,532 x 46 m).

In 2012, the controllers handled 245,000 aircraft movements without incident. In an average day, tower operators handle 800 to 1,000 movements. What makes Cairns unique is the density in which it operates. The airfield may be launching 70 to 120 aircraft in the morning and afternoon, and then 50 or 60 at night for training.

== See also ==
- Alabama World War II Army Airfields
- Fort Rucker, located at 31°20′37″N 85°42′29″W
- Lowe Army Heliport, located at 31°21′21″N 085°45′04″W
- Hanchey Army Heliport, located at 31°20′46″N 085°39′16″W
