= Stephen Jurika =

US Navy officer and aviator (1910–1993)

Stephen Jurika Jr.
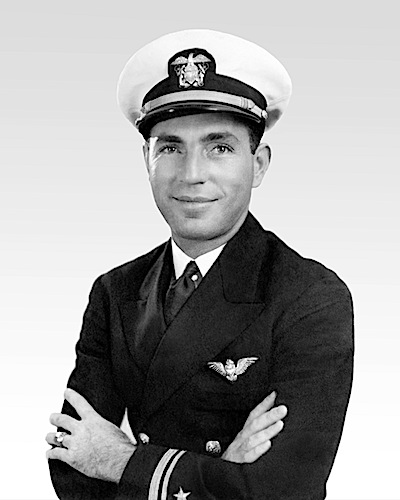
- Stephen Jurika as a lieutenant (jg)
- Born: 9 December 1910; Los Angeles, California
- Died: 15 July 1993 (aged 82); San Mateo, California
- Burial place: Los Altos Cemetery
- Military career
- Allegiance: United States of America
- Branch: United States Navy
- Service years: 1933–1962
- Rank: Captain
- Service number: 0-72378
- Commands: Carrier Air Wing Fourteen
- Conflicts: World War II; Doolittle Raid; Battle of Midway; Guadalcanal Campaign; Solomon Islands campaign; Air raids on Japan; Korean War
- Awards: Navy Cross; Silver Star; Legion of Merit (2); Commendation Medal (2)

Stephen Jurika Jr. (9 December 1910 – 15 July 1993) was a United States Navy officer and aviator during World War II, best known for his role as an intelligence officer in the Doolittle Raid. He was awarded the Navy Cross for his actions as navigator of the aircraft carrier USS Franklin after it was severely damaged and set ablaze by a lone Japanese dive bomber on 19 March 1945. After the war he was the naval air attaché in Australia, and during the Korean War, he was the naval liaison officer with the Japan Air Self-Defense Force. He retired from the Navy in 1962, he became a professor at Stanford University, Santa Clara University and the Naval Postgraduate School in Monterey, California.

== Early life and career ==
Stephen Jurika Jr. (pronounced jer-EE-kah) was born in Los Angeles, California, on 9 December 1910, the son of Stefan Jurika and Blanche Anna née Walker. Stephen had a brother, Thomas Walker Jurika (guerrilla assistant of Chick Parsons), and a sister, Katrushka (wife of Chick Parsons). Stephen spent much of his early years in the Philippines, where his father owned plantations, and went to school in the Philippines, China and Japan. He entered the United States Naval Academy in Annapolis, Maryland, graduating with the class of 1933.

After service on the cruisers USS Louisville and Houston, he became a naval aviator, completing his flight training at Naval Air Station Pensacola. He was then posted to Torpedo Squadron 3 (VT-3), on the aircraft carrier USS Saratoga. He married Lillian Ursula Marie Smith, the daughter of a United States Marine Corps colonel, Harry Locke Smith. They had three daughters, Lillian, Jane and Anne.

In June 1939, he became the naval air attaché in Tokyo, a role in which his ability to speak fluent Japanese was invaluable. "As an aviator", he later recalled, "I was interested in more than just ships. I became interested in targets." He returned to the United States in August 1941, taking up a posting with the Office of Naval Intelligence in Washington, DC.

== World War II ==
In October 1941, Jurika joined the crew of the newly commissioned aircraft carrier USS Hornet as its flight deck and intelligence officer. He briefed the participants in the April 1942 Doolittle Raid on the best industrial and military targets in the city, and the best routes to get to them, and instructed them on how to identify themselves to people in China. He would later be portrayed by Leon Ames in the 1944 movie about the raid, Thirty Seconds Over Tokyo.

Jurika served on the Hornet in the Battle of Midway in June 1942, and at the Battle of the Santa Cruz Islands in October, during which the Hornet was badly damaged and had to be scuttled. In December he became the Operations Officer of AirSols. He was awarded the Legion of Merit and the Commendation Medal for conducting a survey of an airfield site on Japanese-held Munda on New Georgia with a three-man survey party.

Returning to the United States, he served as a torpedo bomber training officer at Naval Air Station Fort Lauderdale and then the Naval Air Operational Training Command in Jacksonville, Florida from August 1943 until December 1944, when he became the navigator on the aircraft carrier USS Franklin. He was present on the bridge on the morning of 19 March 1945 when the Franklin was severely damaged and set ablaze by a lone Japanese dive bomber. When the fires reached the magazine, Jurika later recalled, "Whole aircraft engines with propellers attached, debris of all description, including pieces of human bodies were flung high into the air and descended on the general area like hail on a roof." He remained at his post, and was one of 18 crewmen who were awarded the Navy Cross for their actions that day. He then served as operations officer of Carrier Division One.

== Post-war ==
With his knowledge of Asian languages and customs, Jurika became the naval air attaché in Australia in 1946. He felt that the Chifley government failed to appreciate the danger posed by Communism, and was slow to move against a spy ring known to be operating in Australia. He felt that the Commonwealth Security Service, charged with responsibility for counter-espionage were amateurs and "flatfeet". On his recommendation, and that of the US Ambassador to Australia, Myron M. Cowen, intelligence cooperation with Australia was halted.

Jurika returned to the United States to become the Executive Officer of the Naval Air Station Corpus Christi in Texas. He went back to the Pacific as an officer on the Carrier Division One staff. During the Korean War, he was the naval liaison officer with the Japan Air Self-Defense Force, for which he was awarded the Legion of Merit. His citation read:

Utilizing his extensive knowledge of naval procedures and operations, Captain Jurika supervised the development and implementation of improved joint operating procedures betn Japan Air Defense Force and Naval Units within the Far East which markedly increased defense capabilities in the theater. Operating under these procedures, the combined activities of Air Force Units and Naval radar units and aircraft produced an exceptionally secure and coordinated air defense program. The outstanding resourcefulness and sound judgment Captain Jurika applied to the communications phase of these plans resulted in closer co-ordination and increased effectiveness of the different units. A short-tour inter-service exchange plan he devised for Air Force and Naval officers contributed greatly to effective joint operations; and through his diligent efforts and exemplary conduct, he was instrumental in bringing about an outstanding level of co-operative effort between the two services.

== Later life ==
After service on the staffs of Admirals Arthur W. Radford and Felix Stump, Jurika earned an M.A. degree in geography from George Washington University in June 1957. He commanded Carrier Air Wing Fourteen from 1957 to 1959, and then was Commanding Officer of the Stanford University NROTC program from 1959 to 1962. While there he was both teacher and student, earning his PhD in 1962, writing his doctoral thesis on "The political geography of the Philippines". After retiring from the Navy in 1962, he taught political science at Stanford from 1962 to 1964, at the University of Santa Clara from 1964 to 1975, and at the Naval Postgraduate School in Monterey, California, from 1975 to 1986. He was concurrently a research scholar at the Hoover Institution from 1980 until 1986.

Jurika died from cancer at a hospital in Menlo Park, California, on 15 July 1993, and was interred in Los Altos, California. He was survived by his wife and three daughters, and his brother. His papers are in the Hoover Institution.

== Family tree ==
- Štefan Jurika (1880, Malatiná—1929, California) + Blanche Anna Walker Jurika (1885—1944, Manila North Cemetery)

- Susanna Elizabeth Jurika Cecil (1909, Jolo—1961, Lovelock) + Robert Edgar Cecil (1906—1961)

- Robert S. Cecil
- Victoria J. Cecil
- Stefani Deirdre Cecil Cochran (1940, Manila— )
- Suzita Cecil Myers

- Stephen Jurika (1910, Los Angeles—1993, Menlo Park) + Lillian Ursula Marie Smith Jurika (1920, Parris Island—2011, Los Altos)

- Lilian Ursula Jurika (1938—2006)
- Jane Ellen Jurika (1945— )
- Ann Jurika

- Katrushka Rozhenka Jurika Parsons (1912, Zamboanga—1982, Makati) + Charles Thomas Parsons (1902, Shelbyville—1988, Pasay)

- Michael Parsons
- Peter Parsons (Baguio— )
- Patrick Parsons + Toni Serrano Parsons

- Patrick Parsons
- Maria Parsons

- Jose Parsons

- Thomas Walker Jurika (1914, Zamboanga—1997, Sarasota) + Virginia Laurene Kidwell Jurika (1919, Zamboanga—2003, San Rafael)

- William Jurika
- Anne Jurika Moore
- Louis Lee Jurika (Manila— )
- Thomas Walker Jurika (1954, Davao—1993, Mill Valley)

== Bibliography ==
- Jurika, Stephen (1979). The Reminiscences of Captain Stephen Jurika, Jr., U.S. Navy (Retired). Annapolis, Maryland: United States Naval Institute. OCLC 6001224.
- Olsen, Edward A.; Jurika, Stephen (1986). The Armed Forces in Contemporary Asian Societies. Boulder, Colorado: Westview Press. ISBN 9780813301600.
- Radford, Arthur William; Jurika, Stephen (1980). From Pearl Harbor to Vietnam : the Memoirs of Admiral Arthur W. Radford. Stanford, California: Hoover Institution Press. ISBN 978-0-8179-7211-0.
- Smith, J. Malcolm; Jurika, Stephen (1972). The President and National Security: his Role as Commander-in-Chief. Dubuque, Iowa: Kendall/Hunt Pub. Co. ISBN 9780840303875.
