= Wendell Fertig =

American guerrilla leader in the WW-II Philippines

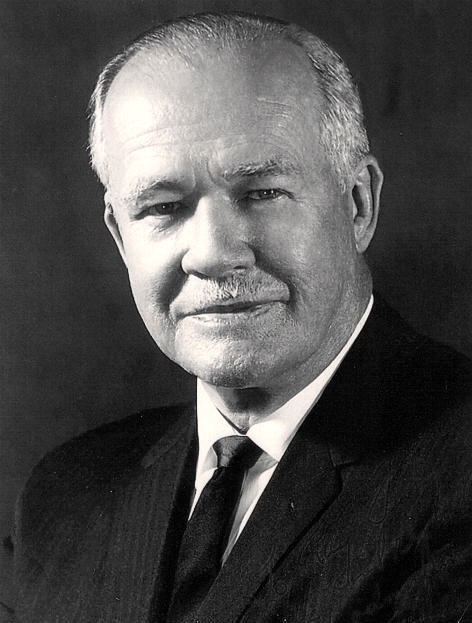
- Colonel Wendell Fertig, 1963
- Born: Wendell Welby Fertig; December 16, 1900; La Junta, Colorado
- Died: March 24, 1975 (aged 74); Wheat Ridge, Colorado
- Education: Colorado School of Mines
- Military career
- Allegiance: United States of America
- Branch: United States Army
- Service years: 1928–1956
- Rank: Colonel
- Nicknames: "Tatay" (the Old Man, Father)
- Commands: Commanding Officer, 10th Military District – Mindanao
- Conflicts: World War II: Battle of Bataan; Battle of Corregidor; Philippine resistance against Japan; Korean War
- Awards: Distinguished Service Cross; Distinguished Service Medal; Legion of Merit (2); Bronze Star Medal; Air Medal (2)
- Other work: Mining and Civil Engineer businessman

Wendell Fertig (December 16, 1900 – March 24, 1975) was an American civil engineer, in the American-administered Commonwealth of the Philippines, who organized and commanded an American-Filipino guerrilla force on the Japanese-occupied, southern Philippine island of Mindanao during World War II. Fertig's widely scattered guerrilla force numbered approximately 32,000. He faced about 50,000 Japanese soldiers, mostly garrison troops in towns and cities.

Fertig held a U.S. Army Reserve commission and was called into military service before the war in the Pacific began. Ordered from Corregidor before its surrender to the Japanese, he was sent to Mindanao to assume command of engineer activities there. Almost as soon as he arrived, the U.S. Army forces on Mindanao surrendered, but Fertig refused to do so. Fertig used his knowledge of the Filipino people to organize them into a guerrilla army and civilian government. He also used his engineering knowledge to solve problems in supply and construction.

Fertig led the guerrillas against the Japanese and their collaborators, mostly in hit-and-run raids and vital coast watching activities. After making contact with U.S. forces in the Pacific, the guerrillas began to receive supplies, but never enough to stage large-scale attacks. More than once, the Japanese made efforts to suppress and destroy elements of Fertig's guerrilla army, committing large numbers of troops for this purpose. At those times, Fertig had his forces retreat and disperse before the Japanese advance and respond with pinprick attacks on small, isolated Japanese units. This continued until American forces returned to the Philippines in late 1944 and 1945.

After the war, Fertig returned to his civilian engineering career, but retained his reserve commission. He spent four years as commander of the Reserve Officers' Training Corps (ROTC) detachment at the Colorado School of Mines, his alma mater, and served in a U.S.-based psychological warfare unit during the Korean War. Leaving active duty in the mid-1950s, he ran a Colorado mining company until his death. During his post-war years he was regarded as a hero by the people of Mindanao, and was a respected figure among the U.S. Special Forces. One authority lists him among the top ten guerrilla leaders in history. However, several of Fertig's subordinates and contemporaries were critical of his leadership and the literature extolling his wartime activities.

== Pre-war ==
Wendell Welby Fertig was born in La Junta, Colorado, where he lived until he completed high school. He then attended the University of Colorado Boulder before transferring to the Colorado School of Mines in Golden, Colorado to study engineering. After graduation from college with a mining degree in 1924, he married his wife Mary. In 1936, he and his family moved to the Philippines where he had a successful career as a civil engineer until the war broke out. Fertig was described as "tall, sandy-haired with an athletic build" and "being calm, genial, deliberate and possessing a remarkable memory and a great facility for remembering names." His experience as an engineer,

... and methods of attacking problems would serve him in the challenges he would face as the leader of the Mindanao guerrillas... It was due primarily to his personal leadership qualities that the Mindanao resistance movement was unified under one leader and became the most successful of all the guerrilla units in the Philippines.

Early in 1941, Fertig was on leave in Manila from his job on Samar. Due to his military classes in college, he received a reserve commission in the United States Army Corps of Engineers on August 3, 1928. As a result, he was called to duty on June 1, 1941, as a captain (reserve) in the Army Engineers as the United States prepared for war in the Pacific theater. At that time, U.S. analysts believed that the Philippines might be one of the first areas Japan would attack. Fertig's first assignments were as Assistant Engineer, Bataan Field Area, then as Engineer, North Luzon Area. By November 1941, he was Chief of the Construction Section, General Headquarters, and spent most of his time overseeing preparation and improvement of airfields throughout the Philippines.

In 1941, the U.S. began evacuating the wives and children of military families. Fertig's wife Mary and their two children Patricia and Jeanne left the Philippines in summer 1941. This action was taken to relieve the concerns of officers and enlisted men, called to duty, about the welfare of their families. American civilian families (men, women and children) were not evacuated, so as not to lessen the morale of the citizens of the Philippines. The native people of the Philippines, who could not leave, suffered under the Japanese occupation. It is estimated that at least one out of every 20 Filipinos died at the hands of the Japanese during the occupation.

== World War II ==
=== Early war experiences ===
On December 20, 1941, Japanese troops invaded the Philippines. Among Fertig's duties during the retreat to Bataan and Corregidor was the destruction of supplies left behind by retreating American forces. His attention to detail was such that he even drove his new Dodge car off a pier and into Manila Bay.

Promoted twice by April 1942, Fertig—by then a lieutenant colonel—was sent from Bataan (on Luzon) to Mindanao by General Edward P. King (Luzon Force Commander) to assist General William F. Sharp (Mindanao Force Commander) in the construction of airfields. In They Fought Alone, the author states that Lieutenant Colonel Fertig was ordered off Corregidor to join General Douglas MacArthur's headquarters in Australia. However, since he was not known to members of MacArthur's headquarters in Australia, it is probably correct that he was ordered to Mindanao to assist American forces there. Fertig arrived on Mindanao on April 30, 1942, and was assigned to supervise the demolition of main roads and bridges to prevent their use by the Japanese.

=== Avoiding capture ===
After the U.S. forces in and around the island of Luzon surrendered in May 1942, Fertig decided not to give himself up to the Japanese. When another fleeing officer accompanying him asked what they were going to do, Fertig replied, "Any damn thing but surrender." During his movement from Corregidor to Mindanao, Fertig survived or avoided a number of airplane crashes. As a result, he felt that he was destined for something special. Later, after organizing the guerrilla forces on Mindanao, he wrote in this diary,

I am called on to lead a resistance movement against an implacable enemy under conditions that make victory barely possible even under the best circumstances. But I feel that I am indeed a Man of Destiny, that my course is charted and that only success lies at the end of the trail. I do not envision failure; it is obvious that the odds are against us and we will not consistently win, but if we are to win only part of the time and gain a little each time, in the end we will be successful.

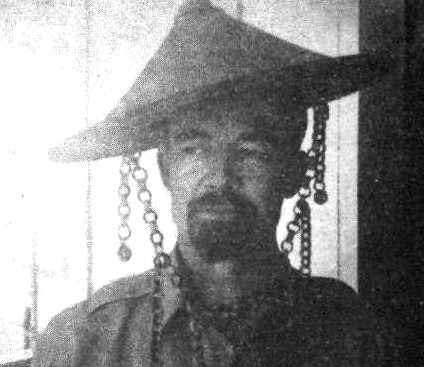
Colonel Fertig wearing red Van Dyke and conical hat in the Philippines during World War II

Upon learning of the surrender of the American forces under General Wainwright, Fertig spent weeks crossing the mountains and jungles in an attempt to contact General Sharp. Upon learning that Sharp had surrendered his forces to the Japanese on May 10, 1942, Fertig then spent more weeks considering his options, realizing that to gain authority, he had to wait until guerrillas contacted him. Fertig monitored the military and political situation in Mindanao, by means of the "jungle telegraph." Fertig also grew a red Van Dyke beard, believing that it would make him look older and wiser among a people who believed that age brought wisdom.

Many of the emerging guerrilla forces at that time were bandit groups pretending to fight the Japanese, but using the collapse of the American-supported government to set themselves up as rulers of local areas. These groups competed with each other for territory and authority. On September 12, 1942, the leader of one strong group approached Fertig, hoping to use him as a front (i.e. representing American military forces) to assume authority over the entire island. Fertig consented, but then used his knowledge of the Filipino people and the current situation in Mindanao to take over the command of that group and then others. Believing that he needed a higher rank, so he would be taken seriously by potential recruits to his struggle, including the leaders of other existing guerrilla bands, Fertig promoted himself to brigadier general. This self-promotion to "brigadier general" did not endear him to General MacArthur or his staff, but MacArthur did send logistical support to Fertig throughout 1943 and 1944.

=== Organizing the resistance ===
Japanese bombings, destruction by retreating American troops, deprivations by bandit guerrilla bands, and hoarding by civilians had reduced available war supplies, as well as those items necessary to run an effective government. Fertig used his engineering skills and the skills of other escaped Americans and resisting Filipinos to create many supplies from scratch. For example, tuba was brewed from coconut palms to provide alcohol to fuel gasoline vehicles, batteries were recharged by soaking them in tuba, soda bottles and fence wire were used to create a telegraph to enhance communications, curtain rods were cut into pieces and shaped to provide ammunition for .30 caliber rifles, steel was shaved from automobile springs and curled to make recoiling springs for rifles, money was printed in both English and the local language using wooden blocks, and fishermen towed Japanese mines ashore to secure the explosive amatol so it could be used to make gunpowder. Soap was made from coconut oil and wood ashes. Then the soap was traded for sugar which was then used to make alcohol for fuel.

Often, seemingly impossible problems were overcome simply through perseverance. For example, Gerardo Almendres, a Filipino high school student had sent away for an International Correspondence Schools course on radios shortly before the war started. Fertig assigned him the task of building a radio even though Almendres had never handled one. Almendres was assisted by a Filipino traveling salesman who had sold radios and by another Filipino. Radio parts (vacuum tubes and other electrical parts) were scrounged from old radio receivers and sound equipment from an old movie projector and other electrical devices. Their makeshift radio eventually worked and they began to receive transmissions from other radios, including those of Roy Bell on Negros, who traveled to Fertig's camp and devised a new aerial. However, they had no way of knowing if their own transmissions were successful until, on January 31, 1943, the U.S. Navy radio monitoring station in San Francisco answered their call sign. Robert C. Ball, William F. Konko, and Stewart Willever Jr., became Fertig's "signal corps".

This was an important accomplishment as American military commands in the Pacific had no idea that there was any effective armed resistance on Mindanao or even in the Philippines. General Charles A. Willoughby, MacArthur's intelligence chief, had assured him that there was no possibility of such. The American command in the Pacific first heard of Fertig when the Japanese announced that a bombing mission had killed "Major General Fertig", but the Americans dismissed it as propaganda. It took weeks before American intelligence was able to confirm who Fertig was, and that he was alive and not operating as an agent of the Japanese. Part of this investigative process involved Mary Fertig, who was contacted for personal information on her husband's life. Mrs. Fertig was in receipt of a letter that her husband had sent on the last American plane leaving Mindanao. A phrase in the letter, "Pineapples for Breakfast", let Mrs. Fertig know that her husband was alive and well on Mindanao, as that is where they spent short vacations and, while there, he enjoyed having pineapples for breakfast. The latest American intelligence had placed Fertig on Corregidor at the time of the surrender, and so the U.S. Army assumed that he was either dead or a prisoner of the Japanese. In February 1943, with tenuous communication established, General MacArthur appointed Fertig as Commanding Officer of the 10th Military District on Mindanao. During the initial exchange of messages, MacArthur disallowed any promotion of American armed forces personnel in the Philippines to general rank. As a result, Fertig "reduced" himself in rank to colonel, but continued wearing the brigadier general stars fashioned for him by a Filipino metalsmith.

Due to the difficulty in communicating with Fertig and his command via makeshift radio Almendres had built, a submarine loaded with military and medical supplies was sent to Mindanao, arriving on March 5, 1943. It also carried two Americans who had known Fertig in the Philippines. One was Charles Smith, who on December 4, 1942, had escaped with two other Americans and two Filipinos by sailing a small boat to Australia, perhaps, at that time, the longest open-boat voyage since Captain Bligh's. Smith was now a captain in U.S. Army Intelligence. The other was Charles Parsons, formerly a businessman but now serving as a lieutenant commander in U.S. Navy Intelligence. In addition to his other pre-war business interests in Manila, Parsons had represented Panama as its resident counsel. When the Japanese occupied Manila, Parsons was careful to speak only Spanish and convinced the Japanese he was a citizen of Panama. As a result, the Japanese sent Parsons and his family on a long journey "back to Panama", but when the Swedish ship carrying them docked in New York, and before he could report to U.S. intelligence, FBI agents came aboard the ship, asked Parsons who he was and hustled him and his family ashore. However, another source states that Parsons reported to U.S. intelligence in the Canal Zone after the ship docked in Panama. It was a matter of diplomatic honor that no one in the German, Italian or other legations, who knew Parsons' true citizenship status, exposed his masquerade to the Japanese. Their role, as Smith and Parsons explained to Fertig, was to verify that he was actually leading a resistance movement and, if so, whether it was worth the risk of men and supplies to support him.

At the same time, Parsons and Smith brought Fertig some unpleasant orders from MacArthur's headquarters. The American Army was willing to provide radios and other equipment for Fertig's command, but these were only to be used for passing information on Japanese activities, from coastwatchers and other sources, to Australia. The guerrillas were ordered not to engage in offensive activities against the Japanese. Fertig admitted that gathering intelligence was an important mission that he would support. However, due to the numerous atrocities that the Japanese were committing against the Philippine population, the only way that Fertig could continue to recruit and maintain a guerrilla force was to attack the Japanese when and where the guerrillas had a chance of winning, so as to provide the Filipinos an outlet for revenge against the Japanese. Fertig stated that if he ordered his men to stop killing the Japanese, then his men would follow other leaders who would probably not be willing to cooperate with MacArthur's headquarters and its directives. In addition, General Charles Willoughby, MacArthur's Chief of Intelligence, was convinced that providing the guerrillas with arms and ammunition was a waste of resources. If a regular U.S. Army had been defeated by the Japanese in the Philippines, then no irregular force could do better. The guerrillas' only purpose was to provide intelligence and later, if equipped prior to the return of American forces to the Philippines, to fight as regular forces under the command of American officers.

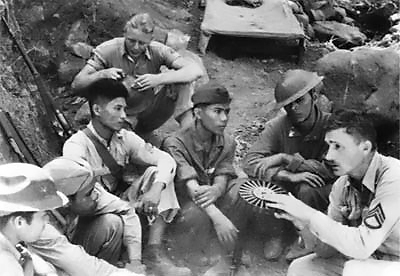
Fertig needed experienced American soldiers to train the Filipino guerrillas.

The almost total lack of supplies was a serious problem, but it was not the most pressing problem Fertig faced. At the time of the Japanese invasion, most Philippine army units were of low quality. They were not only poorly trained, enough time not having passed to do so, but they were under-equipped and did not have the firepower to resist better armed Japanese troops, tanks and planes. Most of the soldiers were barefoot, and many of their World War I era weapons lacked replacement parts and did not operate properly. As a result, many Filipino units fled when attacked by the Japanese. This was symptomatic of Fertig's most pressing need—experienced leaders. He knew that leaders would emerge from the Filipinos, some guerrilla bands already had strong leaders, but he needed them now. His best resource for this leadership cadre was American servicemen who had either not surrendered or had escaped from prisoner-of-war camps. Many were already fighting as guerrilla leaders or were eager to do so, others joined him after he explained the need for their services, but many others were not willing and demanded they be sent to Australia where they could rejoin regular units. Fertig's reaction was not always one of understanding. He told many that they would be returned when a means was found, but that they would never be allowed to return. Others he removed from duty when it was apparent they did not have the leadership skills required. Eventually, they were also returned to Australia by submarine, many with negative reports on their behavior. Some regular Army personnel resented being commanded by a "civilian turned soldier", even if he had been in the Philippines more years than they had. Many of the younger Americans had disobeyed orders to surrender due to their individualism. Others had used cunning to evade the Japanese or escape from the POW camps. These traits sometimes led to clashes with the older men who had lived in the Philippines for years and were now in command positions due to their reserve commissions or promotion by Fertig. As a result, those who departed did not always report favorably on Fertig once they reached MacArthur's headquarters in Australia. Those who stayed and fought received immediate commissions, or were promoted if they already were officers, in the U.S. Army, although they might be sailors, Marines, or even civilians. MacArthur eventually approved all of Fertig's promotions, even though advised not to do so by Lieutenant Colonel Courtney Whitney, his staff officer for Filipino civilian affairs.

=== Fighting the Japanese ===
Colonel Fertig slowly assumed control over more of the existing, rival guerrilla units on Mindanao and turned them to harassing the Japanese. Over the next two and a half years, Fertig created and commanded the Mindanao segment of the "United States Forces in the Philippines" (USFIP), recruiting escaped prisoners-of-war, and soldiers and American civilians who had refused to surrender. However, his real strength came from the thousands of pro-American Filipinos, many of whom were enraged by Japanese atrocities, who now joined existing or formed new organizations under his command. The Japanese were not unaware of these activities, especially as they began to suffer losses in men and equipment and lose control of large areas.

Between 1942 and 1944, USFIP conducted numerous raids against the Japanese Occupation Forces on Mindanao to both sustain Fertig's operation with captured supplies and to carry on harassing operations against the Japanese. This caused discord between Fertig and MacArthur's headquarters. The American South West Pacific Area command wanted Fertig to form coastwatcher units to report on Japanese movements, especially shipping, as its main effort. However, to retain the loyalty of his forces in the wake of Japanese atrocities, Fertig also had to wage an active campaign to kill Japanese and their collaborators, as well as disrupt activities aimed at civilians. Attacks against Japanese troops often initiated terrible reprisals by the Japanese against local civilians, so Fertig issued orders that the guerrillas on Mindanao were to avoid situations that would result in such reprisals. However, due to the Japanese callousness toward the local populations, reprisals often still occurred.

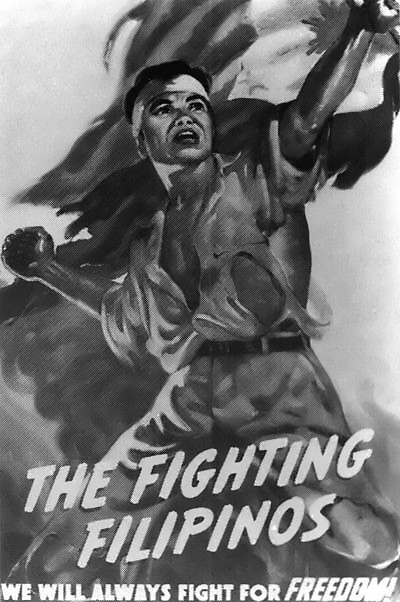
In addition to ambushing occupying Japanese forces, Filipino guerrillas provided valuable intelligence reports to Allied strategists.

Initially, Fertig's forces were able to repel Japanese attempts to recapture territory held by the guerrillas. The Japanese could not take any major actions against USFIP on Mindanao as, not only were they dealing with other resistance movements in the Philippines, but most of their combat troops had been deployed to other areas of the Pacific. However, in late Spring 1943, the Japanese began military actions on a large scale on Mindanao. In those areas affected, USFIP forces had to retreat and give up land, established camps, and government infrastructure to the stronger Japanese forces.

As the guerrilla units and government infrastructure fled before the Japanese forces, something occurred which Fertig had hoped for. He called it the "pillow effect." By providing no resistance to a stronger force, the guerrillas survived the Japanese blow. When the Japanese withdrew, the pillow expanded to its original shape. As the company-sized guerrilla units dissolved, the Japanese began breaking up their units into smaller groups—eventually into squads—to track down these smaller units. Then, without any orders from above, first two or three guerrillas, then 10 or more, then platoon and then company-sized units reorganized and struck back at the smaller Japanese units, causing the Japanese heavy casualties in hundreds of small fire fights. The Japanese responded by reforming into battalion-sized units that needed large towns to support them. Eventually, the Japanese, using 15,000 to 18,000 troops on Mindanao, held the large towns on the sea coast while the USFIP held the rest of the countryside, or approximately 95% of the island of Mindanao. The guerrillas were so effective in some areas, local Japanese commanders made separate truces with them. In exchange for the guerrillas not attacking Japanese troops, the Japanese agreed to stay out of those areas.

In August 1943, based upon favorable reports to MacArthur by Parsons and Smith, Fertig was promoted to full Colonel by MacArthur and received the Distinguished Service Cross for his efforts. On August 23, Fertig received the following message:

In recognition of your meritorious services as District Commander and extraordinary heroism in action during the period of 8 May 42 to 6 August 43, I have awarded you the Distinguished Service Cross, Announcement of your award is published in GO Hqs. USAFFE dtd 18 August. I congratulate you on the distinguished service to your country and to the Filipino people that has so well earned for you such recognition and hope that in it you will find inspiration for even greater future service. Quezon congratulates you on promotion.

Fertig even created a navy by arming several small merchant vessels, which he used to protect convoys of small vessels that helped distribute supplies brought in by Allied submarines. These vessels also attacked Japanese shipping, primarily small inter-coastal vessels and patrol boats. The USFIP navy was armed with various machine guns salvaged off downed bombers, home-made cannons, and even mortars. Later, some used 20 mm cannons were supplied by the U.S. Navy. One vessel was even armored using large, circular forestry saws taken from abandoned plantations. Some of the actions these vessels participated in were heroic to the extreme, as when one small vessel deliberately engaged in a running battle with a large Japanese steamer, and another, a sailing ship armed with 20 mm cannon, fought off Japanese aircraft and actually shot one down, perhaps establishing a record for being the only sailing ship to shoot down an airplane—a Japanese Mitsubishi medium bomber. More importantly, the crew salvaged a new Japanese bomb sight from the wreckage and sent it out on the next submarine to Australia. One of Fertig's most audacious ship captains was Waldo Neveling, a German civilian, soldier of fortune, and an "enemy alien" Fertig had commissioned into the U.S. Army. Another ship, called The Bastard, was actually a 26-foot (7.9 m) whaleboat captained by Australian Robert "Jock" McLaren, an escaped prisoner-of-war from the Sandakan POW camp on Borneo. McLaren would sail his boat into Japanese controlled ports in broad daylight, shoot up the supply vessels and piers with machine guns and a mortar, then turn tail and run.

To help prepare for the eventual invasion of American forces, Fertig even had airstrips prepared and disguised, one as long as 7,000 feet (2,100 m) which took over a year to build. The airstrips were built and then covered with topsoil and planted with crops. All that was needed was a bulldozer to scrape off the topsoil and the airstrip would then be ready for planes. Some of these airstrips were later used by U.S. Marine Corps squadrons to provide close-air support during the invasion.

Early in 1945, the Japanese army once again launched an anti-guerrilla campaign in an attempt to destroy the resistance movement on Mindanao. Although essentially a repeat of their previous failed efforts, they came close to destroying the guerrillas, not by eliminating them, but by cutting off their sources of supplies. This effort came to an abrupt end when the American army and navy launched their long-awaited liberation of the Philippines, with a landing, first on Leyte, and then, on April 18, 1945, on Mindanao. As the Japanese army pulled its troops out of Mindanao to defend other portions of the Philippines, American air and naval forces exacted a terrible toll on Japanese shipping, killing untold thousands of Japanese troops. When many of the survivors of the sinking ships swam ashore, they found Filipino guerrillas and civilians waiting for them on the beaches, armed with bolos. Exhausted from the swim, the Japanese were unable to fight back against the terrible retribution the Filipinos then exacted for the atrocities the Japanese had perpetrated against them during the years of occupation.

The USFIP also contributed heavily to coastwatching activities as requested by MacArthur's headquarters. Fertig's coastwatchers provided information leading to the victories in the first Battle of the Philippine Sea (the "Great Marianas Turkey Shoot") and the Battle of Leyte Gulf. Other intelligence gathered by Fertig's guerrillas was so accurate that aerial reconnaissance flights before attacks were often canceled so as not to warn the Japanese. The guerrillas often went to great risks to secure accurate information. For example, they would make pencil-and-paper rubbings of the serial numbers on enemy artillery to prove the accuracy of their information. However, estimates of enemy strength in an area were sometimes unreliable, as, with the American forces now in the Philippines, the Japanese were constantly moving their forces around to meet the threat. Lieutenant General Robert Eichelberger, commanding the U.S. Eighth Army, often downplayed guerrilla intelligence, but this was throughout the Philippines as a whole. For the 10th Military District, commanded by Fertig, he had this to say:

We did have considerable information about dispositions of enemy troops, since guerrilla forces on Mindanao were the most effective and best organized in the Philippines.

However, probably the best estimate of the value of guerrilla intelligence came from the Japanese, when they released an official communique stating that the Americans had "perfected a new aerial bomb which was attracted by concentrations of ammunition and fuel." The "bomb" in question was simply accurate information on Japanese installations supplied by the guerrillas.

As first American carrier planes, and then long-distance land-based planes, began raids on the Philippines, the guerrillas became important for yet another reason. As American pilots bailed out when their planes were hit by Japanese anti-aircraft fire, they often found Filipino guerrillas waiting for them even before they hit the ground. Pilots who landed in the water were picked up quickly by Filipinos in small, swift boats. Often the pilots would be expressing their appreciation of the guerrillas to their ships' debriefing officers within a day or two. Fertig soon issued orders that pilots were not allowed to go on patrol with the guerrillas, as some of the more enthusiastic pilots were doing. He knew they were more important flying missions against Japanese targets. Besides, Colonel Fertig now had a good supply of experienced, battle-hardened American and Filipino leaders for his combat patrols.

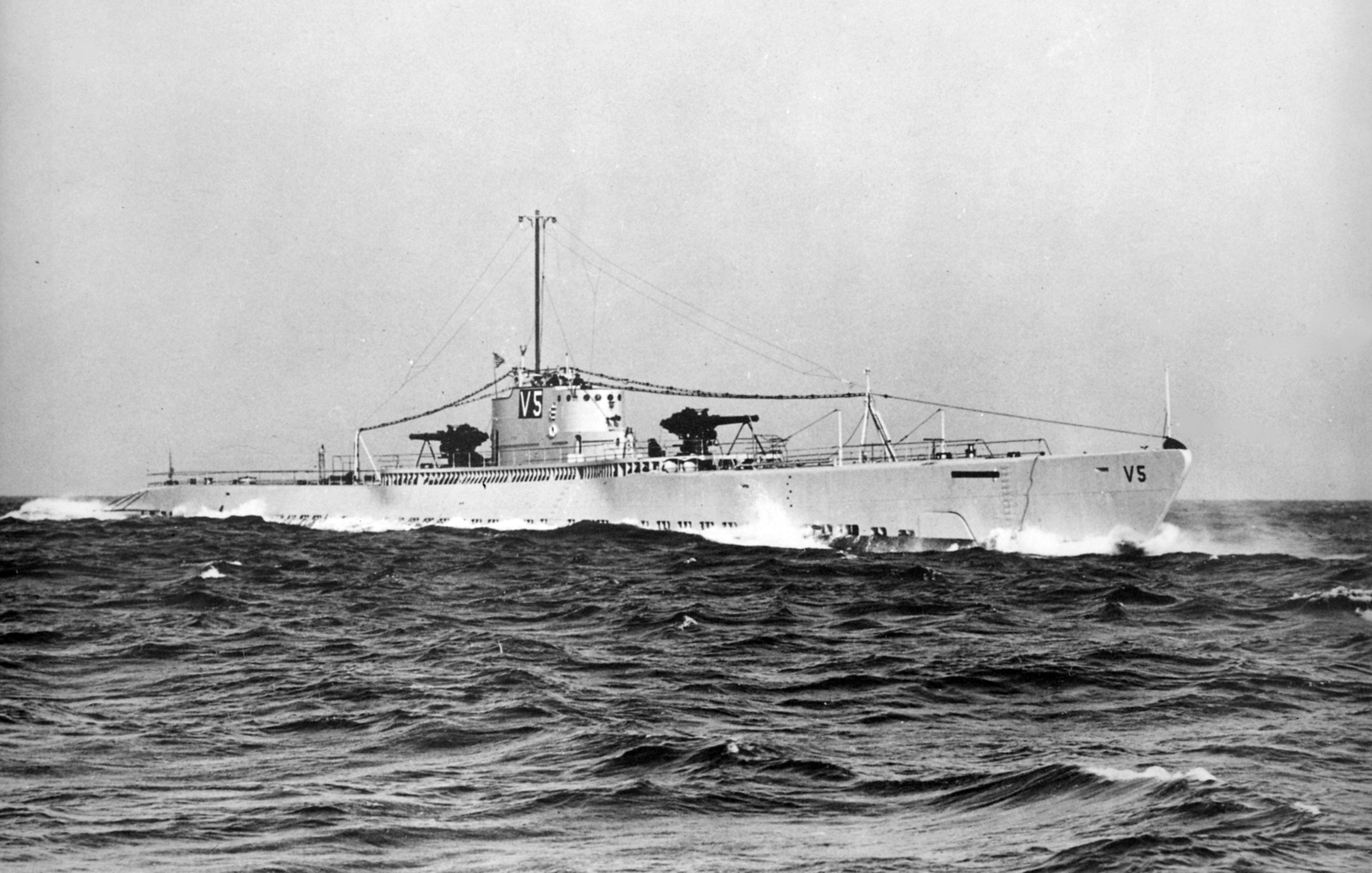
The USS Narwhal, a submarine with a large cargo capacity, made supply runs to the Philippines.

From its humble beginnings, USFIP became one of the best equipped and most effective irregular units operating in World War II. When the submarine USS Narwhal arrived at Mindanao in Nov. 1943 to deliver supplies, the crew was met by a uniformed band playing "Stars and Stripes Forever." Although submarines had already delivered supplies to Fertig and other guerrilla leaders, Narwhal's large size enabled it to deliver 100 tons of supplies at a time, whereas other submarines could only deliver four tons or less. This greatly increased the ability of the guerrilla forces not only to inflict damage to the enemy, but also provide the necessary supplies to care for the medical health and well-being of the guerrilla forces and their civilian supporters. In addition, Narwhal had the room to evacuate guerrillas needing critical medical care, as well as American civilians, primarily women and children, who had been hiding out in the Philippines and were suffering from malnutrition and diseases. According to U.S. Navy records, 16 of 41 resupply missions to the Philippines were directed to Mindanao between January 14, 1943, and January 1, 1945. For all of the Philippines, a total of 1,325 tons of supplies were landed, with 331 people landed and another 472 evacuated.

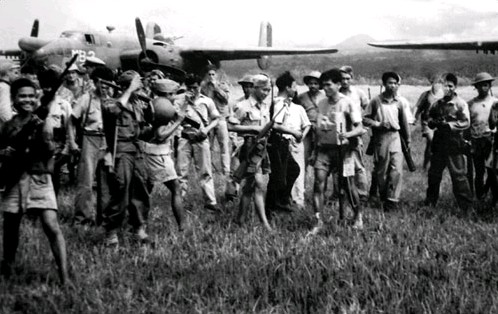
Philippine guerillas greet the crews of U.S. Marine Corps PBJ-1D Mitchell bombers on Mindanao, 1945..

As an indicator of USFIP strength on Mindanao, during January and February 1945, in preparation for the return of regular American forces, the guerrillas seized the Dipolog airstrip in northern Zamboanga and held it while surrounded by the Japanese. With the arrival of regular American forces in March 1945, Fertig's guerrilla forces participated in the Battle of Mindanao that effectively ended organized Japanese resistance on that island. They then disbanded. On September 15, 1945, the 6th Infantry Division of the Philippine Army was reactivated, and its ranks were heavily seeded with Filipino veterans of the USFIP at all levels of command.

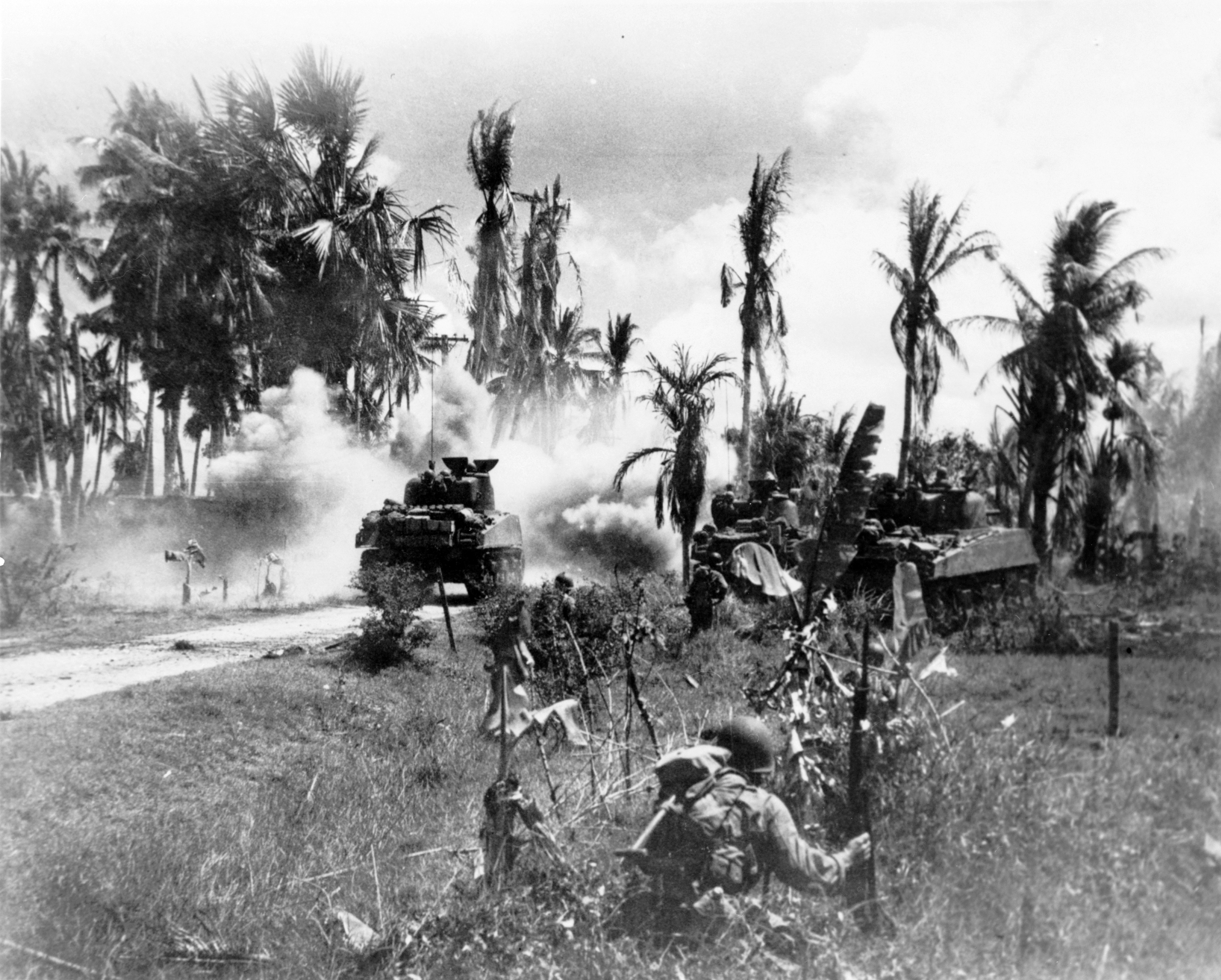
American forces advancing on Panay Island.

By late 1944, Fertig commanded a force estimated at between 25,000 and 40,000 effectives, with most sources agreeing on 36,000—the equivalent of an army corps—with 16,500 of them armed. Officers with responsibility for corps command usually hold the rank of lieutenant general. In addition, Fertig created and helped administer the civilian government of Mindanao while at the same time conducting the guerrilla war against the Japanese. Author John Keats wrote (Note: In writing the book They Fought Alone, author John Keats worked from material provided to him by Fertig, including diaries, memoranda, a history of the Mindanao guerilla, and a 600 page manuscript written by Fertig. Keats writes in the book's Preface: "From beginning to end, this is essentially the story and the work of Colonel Wendell W. Fertig.") that the USFIP killed 7,000 Japanese soldiers and, while a constant drain on Japanese resources, they also prevented the Japanese from fully utilizing Mindanao's resources in support of its war efforts. At one time, the Japanese committed approximately 60,000 troops in an attempt to crush guerrilla resistance on Mindanao, troops that were desperately needed elsewhere. Throughout the entire Philippines, the guerrillas managed to tie down a Japanese army of 288,000 troops, of which approximately 43,000–60,000 were on Mindanao, depending on the time period. (Note: Larry Schmidt writes of the John Keats source cited in support of these figures: "Partially fictionalized but based on Fertig's personal papers. Lacking in dates, structural continuity. No documentation - assumption is that Fertig approved Keats' account.)

After the war, examination of Japanese records indicated that the Japanese high command felt that 24 battalions of troops would be needed to guard rear areas against guerrillas once the American invasion of the Philippines began. Since seven divisions were slated to resist the invasion, this resulted in a ratio of one rear-area soldier to every three front-line troops. Ultimately, the Japanese concluded that, "It is impossible to fight the enemy and at the same time suppress the activities of the guerrillas."

While summarizing Colonel Wendell Fertig's contributions to the American war effort and his leadership of the USFIP on Mindanao, Keats (1990) states:

...apart from his insistence on honesty and justice, and the idea that the guerrilla army be a process of a responsible civil government, his fundamental contribution to Mindanao was his concern that the reward for performance should always be increased responsibility. In his command, demonstrated competence was the sole means to promotion, and no man was denied an opportunity to prove himself. This concept built a nation in North America, and it built another on Mindanao... It was Fertig, more than any other man, who gave the Filipinos of Mindanao increasing reason to believe in themselves. This, rather than a military victory, was Fertig's triumph.

The Moro Muslim Datu Pino sliced the ears off Japanese and cashed them in with Colonel Fertig at the exchange rate of a pair of ears for one bullet and 20 centavos (equivalent to $1.79 in 2025).

== Controversies and criticisms ==
Fertig did not preside over the guerrillas on Mindanao without controversy. In 1942, Fertig was persuaded to take leadership of the incipient guerrilla movement by a Filipino policeman named Luis Morgan who realized that an American leader was necessary to get support from the American military. However, as time went on, Morgan became increasingly disenchanted with Fertig. He resigned his position as chief of staff on August 10, 1943, claiming that Fertig undermined him and other Filipinos by favoritism to Americans. Fertig sent him to Australia via submarine in September.

In 1943, prisoner of war escapees Major (later General) Stephen Mellnik and Navy Lt. Commander M. H. McCoy described the reception they got on first meeting Fertig as strange, evasive, and almost hostile. They requested transportation by submarine to Australia which Fertig eventually arranged. McCoy concluded that Fertig wasn't used to dealing with equals. As mentioned previously, Fertig's self-designated rank of brigadier general did not find favor with General MacArthur in Australia.

Lt. Col Edward E. McClish, one of Fertig's division commanders, and McClish's chief of staff Major Clyde Childress had a rocky relationship with Fertig. Fertig's opinion was that McClish and Childress were "disloyal, incompetent," and had done little for the guerrilla movement on Mindanao. Specifically, he said McClish was a last-second planner, too aggressive in wanting to battle the Japanese, and had chosen his subordinates unwisely. McClish and Childress were among several American officers serving under Fertig who requested transfers from the guerrillas to regular U.S. Army commands which became possible after the U.S. invasion of the Philippines on October 20, 1944. Fertig relieved, at their request, Childress on December 29, 1944, and McClish on January 23, 1945. Robert Lapham, another guerrilla leader, described McClish and Childress's opinion of Fertig as "paranoid and consumed with personal ambition, not to speak of ungrateful and discourteous to them after they had made it possible for him to move his headquarters to a safe location."

Childress carried the criticism of Fertig a step further. In 2003, after reviewing Fertig's papers at the MacArthur Memorial, Childress wrote of Fertig's "fictional autobiography" (Keat's They Fought Alone) and said he was appalled that Fertig "could produce such inaccurate, contemptuous, incomplete, and erroneous reports of the activities of an important military command."

== Post-war ==
Some scholars question why Fertig did not receive the Medal of Honor, despite his considerable military achievements at great risk of his life. Others question why, when Fertig commanded so large an army of irregular guerrillas, he was not promoted to brigadier general when other men, who were never in combat, received that rank as the U.S. Army grew in size. William Manchester, in his 1978 biography of MacArthur, American Caesar, offers the opinion that MacArthur and his staff may have had their own agenda in minimizing the efforts of Fertig, other resistance leaders and the guerrillas themselves in liberating the Philippines. For example, The American Joint Chiefs of Staff authorized General MacArthur to liberate the island of Luzon, but none of the other Philippine islands. After capturing Luzon, MacArthur invaded numerous other islands without authorization, and his actions were followed by a retroactive endorsement from the Joint Chiefs. Manchester stated, "He [MacArthur] wanted to become the liberator of the Philippines." The Japanese Army's practice of referring to Fertig as "Major General Fertig, Commander in Chief in the Philippines" throughout the occupation period and its use of Japanese military notation in referring to the 10th Military District as the "10 Army Group" did not endear Fertig to MacArthur's headquarters.

Manchester also relates that Lieutenant Colonel Courtney Whitney, an "ultraconservative Manila corporation lawyer" was assigned to MacArthur's staff, promoted, and assigned responsibility for Philippine civil affairs. Manchester wrote:

...from the standpoint of the guerrillas he was a disastrous choice. Undiplomatic and belligerent, he was condescending toward all Filipinos, except those who, like himself, had substantial investments in the Philippines... and by the time MacArthur was ready to land on Leyte, Whitney had converted most of the staff to reactionaryism. At his urging the General (MacArthur) barred OSS agents from the Southwest Pacific, because Whitney suspected they would aid leftwing guerrillas.

By minimizing the efforts of the guerrilla movement in freeing the Philippines, Whitney also robbed it of political clout after the war to make any substantial liberal changes in Philippine government and society after the war.

In May 1946, Colonel Fertig was awarded the U.S. Army Distinguished Service Medal. The citation reads in part:

Constantly engaged with vastly superior enemy forces, he engendered Filipino faith and confidence in their ultimate deliverance, instilled in them the will to resist, and united them in the cause of freedom. By his outstanding courage, tireless determination, and brilliant leadership, Colonel Fertig made an inestimable contribution to the liberation of the Philippine Islands.

After the war, Fertig spent four years as the officer-in-charge of ROTC at the Colorado School of Mines.

However, when the Korean War began, he spent two years at the Pentagon with a psychological warfare unit. From July 1951 to June 1952, he was the Special Forces Plans Officer in the Office of the Chief of Psychological Warfare with Headquarters U.S. Army. Then from June 1952 to August 1953, he served as Deputy Chief of Psychological Warfare. It was during this time that he helped establish the Army's Psychological Warfare Center at Fort Bragg, North Carolina, which later became the John F. Kennedy Special Warfare Center and School. Due to his wartime experiences and post-war work, Fertig is one of three men who "used their wartime experience to formulate the doctrine of unconventional warfare that became the cornerstone of SF [Special Forces]," and is considered one of the founding fathers of the U.S. Army Special Forces.

Colonel Fertig was released from active duty in 1956 after serving as deputy director of the joint staff for the provisional military assistance advisory group in South Korea from 1954 to 1955.

Fertig was widely regarded as a hero by the people of Mindanao. In June 1958, Wendell Fertig and his wife returned to Mindanao on a business trip. As the inter-island freighter pulled into Cagayan de Oro, the ship's captain approached Fertig and said, "Sir, I think friends await you." As numerous small craft full of shouting men surrounded the ship, Wendell and Mary Fertig saw:

...thousands of Filipinos waiting at the waterfront at Cagayan... They had come from every corner of Mindanao... There were masses of women in the white uniforms of the Women's Auxiliary Service, and men wearing caps of the Philippine Veterans Legion, and the red fezzes of the Moros... The men were shouting and the women were singing...

They then saw a huge banner over the pier:

Welcome the Indomitable Patriot Who Have Lessened Human Suffering on Mindanao

Wendell Fertig ran a successful mining company in Colorado until he died on March 24, 1975 at the Lutheran Hospital in Wheat Ridge.

== Popular culture ==
A movie on Wendell Fertig has been in the planning stages for several years. As of March 2009, "Robert Towne had finished the screenplay and it was presented to Sony Productions for final approval. David Fincher, the director, is eager to start production."

Several movie Web sites now list the movie, but most state it is "in development." Brad Pitt, with whom Fincher has worked before, is listed in the role of "Fertig." The New York Times site lists Columbia TriStar Motion Picture Group as the studio, Sony Pictures as the domestic theatrical distributor, and Red Wagon Entertainment as the production company. As of 2021, the Fertig film has not materialized, but in Quentin Tarantino's novelization of Once Upon a Time in Hollywood the backstory of Pitt's Cliff Booth character is revealed to be that of an American World War II commando who was captured and imprisoned by the Japanese in the Philippines, but escaped into the jungle and went on to wage guerrilla war against occupying Japanese forces alongside his "Filipino guerrilla brothers."

Wendell Fertig and some fictionalized actions of the U.S. Forces in the Philippines are featured in W.E.B. Griffin's 7th book of The Corps series, Behind the Lines; and also in the 4th book of his Men at War series, The Fighting Agents. The books are based on the beginning phases of Fertig's operation and the top-level political maneuvering surrounding it.

Wendell Fertig and 2 "imposters" appeared on an episode of the game show To Tell the Truth on September 9, 1963.

== Decorations ==

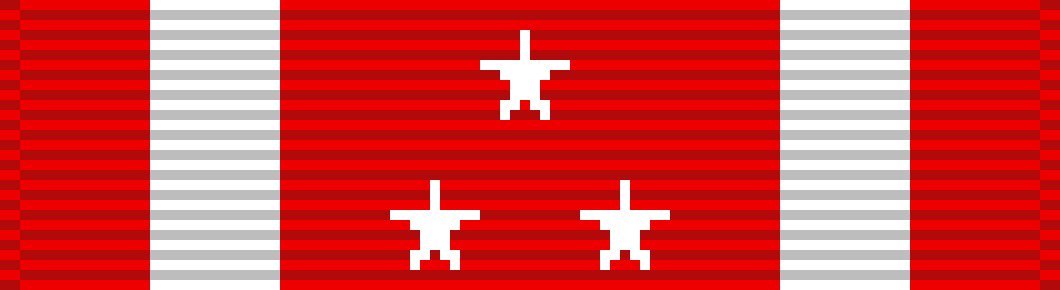

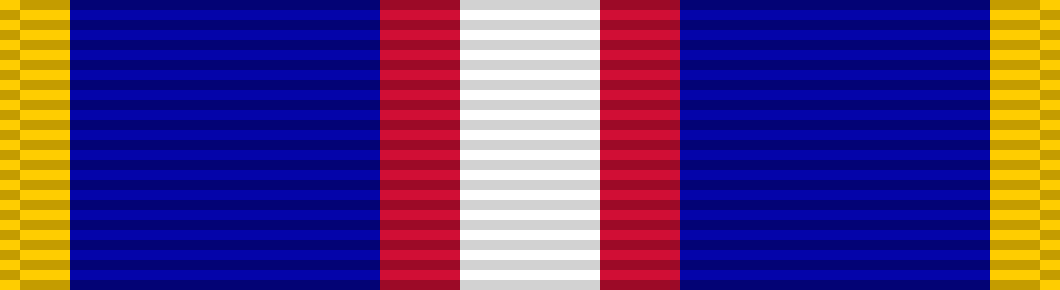

Badge	Combat Infantryman Badge		
1st row	Distinguished Service Cross		Army Distinguished Service Medal
2nd row	Legion of Merit with 1 Oak leaf cluster	Bronze Star Medal	Air Medal with 1 Oak leaf cluster
3rd row	American Defense Service Medal with 'Foreign Service' clasp	American Campaign Medal	Asiatic-Pacific Campaign Medal with 3 Campaign stars
4th row	World War II Victory Medal	National Defense Service Medal	Korean Defense Service Medal (Retroactively awarded)
5th row	Philippine Defense Medal with 1 Campaign star	Philippine Liberation Medal with 2 Campaign stars	Philippine Independence Medal
Unit awards	Presidential Unit Citation		Philippine Presidential Unit Citation

== Dates of rank ==
- Second Lieutenant – July 23, 1928
- First Lieutenant – January 6, 1932
- Captain – January 29, 1936
- Major – June 25, 1941
- Lieutenant Colonel – December 19, 1941
- Colonel – August 4, 1943

== See also ==
- List of American guerrillas in the Philippines
- Donald Blackburn
- Ed Dyess
- Samuel Grashio
- Ruperto Kangleon
- Edward E. McClish
- Iliff David Richardson
