= The Corps Series =

Series of war novels by W.E.B. Griffin

The Corps is a series of war novels written by W.E.B. Griffin about the United States Marine Corps before and during the years of World War II and the Korean War. The story features a tightly knit cast of characters in various positions within the Marine Corps, Navy, and upper levels of the United States Government.

== List of books ==
- Book I, Semper Fi (1986) - Main action takes place between January 2, 1941 and January 17, 1942.
- Book II, Call to Arms (1987) - Main action takes place between December 18, 1941 and August 30, 1942.
- Book III, Counterattack (1990) - Main action takes place between December 7, 1941 and August 9, 1942.
- Book IV, Battleground (1991) - Main action takes place between June 4 and August 25, 1942.
- Book V, Line of Fire (1992) - Main action takes place between Spring and October 11, 1942.
- Book VI, Close Combat (1993) - Main action takes place between October 11 and November 19, 1942.
- Book VII, Behind the Lines (1996) - Main action takes place between April 7, 1942 and February 8, 1943.
- Book VIII, In Danger's Path (1999) - Main action takes place between November, 1941 and May 5, 1943.
- Book IX, Under Fire (2002) - Main action takes place between June 1 and September 29, 1950.
- Book X, Retreat, Hell! (2004) - Main action takes place between September 28 and November 3, 1950.

== Primary characters ==
=== Major Kenneth R. "Killer" McCoy, USMCR ===
First Appearance: Semper Fi

His name is Kenneth R. McCoy, the introductory character of the saga, a Marine Corporal stationed in Shanghai, China with the 4th Marines (the primary component of the China Marines) prior to the attack on Pearl Harbor. Ken has a great affinity for languages and in China learns Japanese, Wu, Mandarin, and Cantonese, which leads to his being assigned to intelligence-gathering convoys by Captain Edward Banning, USMC, the Fourth Marine Regiment's intelligence officer. His fellow Marines call him "Killer" for killing two Italian Marines in self-defense with a baby Fairbairn–Sykes knife (to his great embarrassment), and for having killed 18 Chinese bandits in the employ of the Kempetai with a Thompson submachine gun while on an intelligence mission.

Following the action in which he killed 18 "bandits," he is transferred back to the United States and is debriefed concerning Japanese techniques and plans by the head of Marine Corps Intelligence. Following this, McCoy is sent to Officer Candidate School to earn a commission as a second lieutenant. After graduating from OCS, he is assigned as an officer courier for intelligence in the Pacific while working for the Marine Corps Office of Management Analysis, a special, little known intelligence group run by Lieutenant Colonel (later Brigadier General) Fritz Rickabee.

While on a courier run just after Pearl Harbor, he manages to make it into the Philippines shortly before the Japanese invasion and reunites with Captain Ed Banning while assisting in the defence of a landing beach. Following an artillery barrage, McCoy carries the wounded Banning to a monastery for treatment. He makes it through enemy lines and is returned to the States. He is awarded a Purple Heart for wounds received and a Bronze Star for his performance under fire and his efforts to save Captain Banning.

McCoy is next assigned to evaluate Lieutenant Colonel Evans Carlson of the 2nd Marine Raider Battalion, whose unorthodox methods caused concern among his superiors. He trains for six months with the Marine Raiders in San Diego, and participates in the Raid on Makin Island.

He participates in several secret missions under Brigadier General Fleming Pickering, including landing on Japanese-controlled Mindanao; staging the rescue of two Marines manning a Coastwatcher station on the island of Buka; being sent on "Operation Windmill" by General Pickering to evaluate the sanity of General Wendell Fertig and the resistance potential of his U.S. Forces in the Philippines; and setting up a weather station in the Gobi Desert urgently needed by the Navy and the Army Air Force. During the course of the series he receives a Bronze Star, three Silver Stars, the Distinguished Service Medal, the British Victoria Cross, and the Purple Heart with five stars. Following the success of Operation Gobi, McCoy is promoted to the rank of Major and is ordered to attend the U.S. Army Command and General Staff course, a desirable course which usually is reserved for officers destined for great things, by direction of President Roosevelt.

(Note: The Victoria Cross is an error on the part of the author. Only British and Commonwealth subjects serving in the armed forces were eligible for this medal, the highest award in the British honours system for combat valour. It seems more likely McCoy would have been awarded the Military Cross or the British Distinguished Service Cross.)

Following his return from establishing Station Nowhere in the Gobi Desert in May, 1943, he and Ernestine Sage were married and McCoy attended and graduated from the "long course" at C&GS School. Apart from that assignment, newly promoted Major McCoy continued to work for General Pickering in the OSS until the end of the war, though. After C&GS School the only other assignment specifically mentioned was his accompanying General Pickering on the first flight of Americans into Atsugi Air Base in August, 1945 prior to the formal Japanese surrender. During the period between his graduation and General Pickering's involvement in the Japanese surrender, Ken and Ernie were stationed at the Marine base at Quantico, VA, where his duties were not specified but it may be assumed he was an instructor of some sort, possibly teaching guerrilla operations behind the enemy lines.

Based on the fact that when the story picks up in June, 1950 McCoy is once again a captain, it is clear he was caught up in the reduction-in-force that happened to the armed services after World War II. Due to his lack of a college degree, at some point after World War II ended he was reduced in rank to captain despite having graduated from the Command and General Staff School and having more than enough time in grade to make his promotion permanent. He observed that "The Corps had a – maybe unwritten – policy that if you were reduced in grade, you were transferred ...", which saw the McCoys sent to Japan.

Between the end of World War II and the start of the Korean War, McCoy is assigned to Supreme Headquarters Allied Powers, General MacArthur's headquarters in Japan as part of its naval element, still working in Intelligence and specializing in Korea. He learns to speak and read Korean, and develops his own network of intelligence sources. Following his submission of a report that directly contradicts General Charles Willoughby's report to MacArthur that all is quiet in Korea, Willoughby attempts to run McCoy out of the Marine Corps. Feeling he has nothing to lose, he contacts his former boss, Fleming Pickering, and asks him to get his report (which, never having been entered into the intelligence filing system by Willoughby, he was able to spirit out of SCAP HQ without anyone noticing) into the hands of the CIA. The report comes to the attention of President Harry Truman and McCoy is retained on active duty.

After the Korean War breaks out, he is co-opted into the CIA by General Pickering, who has been recalled to active duty in the Marine Corps by the President as the CIA Deputy Director for Asia. Once again, Pickering uses McCoy as his eyes and ears on the ground and gives him his head. This results in McCoy setting up an intelligence operation generally similar to that of Mac MacMillan in The Brotherhood of War series. Among other things, McCoy conceives and with the approval of General Pickering carries out the seizure of islands in the Flying Fish Channel in the Inchon approaches without tipping off the North Koreans that enables Douglas MacArthur to successfully land two divisions there. As a result, he is promoted to Major by General MacArthur, and decorated with the Silver Star.

McCoy successfully rescues Pick Pickering three months after Pick was shot down while shooting up an enemy train and evaded capture by the North Koreans, and continues his intelligence operations in Korea. While this is happening, his wife Ernestine successfully gives birth to a son in Japan after having suffered repeated miscarriages.

As The Corps' final book to date (Retreat, Hell!) ends with the Korean War still raging, we know nothing of McCoy's post-Korean War life or assignments.

=== Colonel Edward C. Banning, USMC ===
First Appearance: Semper Fi

Introduced as the S-2 (intelligence) officer of the 4th Marines in China, and assigned as McCoy's legal advisor after Ken's killing of the two Italian marines. Initially he wants to plead McCoy guilty, but McCoy refuses, and to the chagrin of the prosecutor McCoy comes up with members of William E. Fairbairn's "Flying Squad" of the Shanghai Police as witnesses.

Banning quickly becomes an integral part of the book as McCoy is slowly indoctrinated into the world of intelligence gathering. After charges are dismissed, Banning sends McCoy on convoys to "get him out of sight", and discovers McCoy has great talent as an observer and evaluator of Japanese military readiness. Also a China Marine, his relationship with McCoy changes from superior officer to peer as the story progresses. Unlike the majority of pre-World War II regular Marine Corps officers, Banning is a graduate of The Citadel, the Military College of South Carolina.

When orders come down transferring the Fourth Marines to the Philippines, Banning marries his longtime lover Ludmilla Zhvikov, a stateless person (a genuine White Russian countess and daughter of a Tsarist general) traveling on a Nansen passport. But for the impending war, this would have destroyed his career; as it is, his superiors barely take note of it. He is forced to leave Milla behind when the regiment sails, as a subordinate of his, Sergeant Ernest Zimmerman, also had to do with his Chinese wife, Mae Su.

After the 4th Marines are moved from Shanghai to the Philippines, he finds himself defending the beaches of Lingayen Gulf (Luzon) during the Japanese invasion. He is temporarily blinded and transferred off Corregidor by submarine with other seriously wounded US servicemen; fortunately, his sight returns before reaching port.

Banning subsequently serves in the Office of Management Analysis and under Brigadier General Pickering in the Office of Strategic Services (OSS) during World War II, finishing up the war on the staff of General Joseph Stilwell as an analyst and special cryptographer in charge of the ultra-secret MAGIC Special Channel. Killer McCoy arranges for Ludmilla to be brought out of China as part of Operation Gobi, and Banning reunites with her — and with his son, Edward Edwardovich Banning, whom he had never seen.

At the beginning of the Korean War in Under Fire, he is a colonel in charge of Marine Barracks in Charleston, South Carolina, near retirement, and contemplating a future in real estate development on islands his wealthy family own. Like Ken McCoy, he is co-opted into the CIA by General Pickering, serving on his personal staff until the General, following a meeting with Director Walter Bedell Smith, the new head of the CIA, reassigns him as the CIA's Tokyo station chief.

Nothing is known of Banning's career or life following the Korean War, although in Under Fire a possible path is given. The Banning family owns an island south of Hilton Head, and Banning has in mind developing it as a retirement community for senior military officers who have never owned homes of their own.

=== Master Gunner Ernest Zimmerman, USMC ===
First Appearance: Semper Fi

Ernest "Ernie" Zimmerman is a China Marine sergeant who serves with McCoy in Shanghai and operates with him in reconnaissance missions. He was present when a group of Chinese bandits in the pay of the Kempeitai attacked one of the convoys McCoy used as a cover for his intelligence work, killing more than a dozen of them. As a result, he is one of a very few people who can call McCoy "Killer" without incurring McCoy's wrath. Like McCoy, he is fluent in Wu, Cantonese, and Mandarin.

When the 4th Marines are ordered to the Philippines, in November 1941, Zimmermann is forced to leave his Chinese wife, Mae Su, behind. She returns to her home village, bringing Major Banning's wife, Ludmilla Zhivkov, with her. Later, the two and their children become part of a caravan of American soldiers, sailors, and Marines both active duty and retired, who intend to escape the Japanese by crossing the Gobi Desert to India.

Later, Zimmermann serves with McCoy in the Marine Raiders on the Makin Island raid. Following this, Zimmerman serves with VMF-229 in the Pacific during the first months of the Guadalcanal Campaign. At McCoy's request, he assists in landing on the Japanese-held Buka Island to resupply a Coastwatcher base; bringing in new personnel and extracting exhausted USMC personnel. He is then transferred to the OSS at Ken McCoy's request. He takes part in an evaluation mission to General Wendell Fertig in the Philippines to determine if Fertig is sane and in a position to wage guerrilla warfare against the Japanese.

Following this, he is assigned to help McCoy set up a weather station in the Gobi Desert. During that operation, Zimmerman is reunited with his wife and children. The family is evacuated to the United States after General Pickering uses his influence with Senator Fowler of California (a longtime personal friend) to write a private bill granting non-quota immigrant visas to the family. At McCoy's request, Ernie Sage provides the money to help set them up in business in South Carolina.

Following the Gobi Desert assignment in 1943, Zimmerman is promoted to Master Gunner by direction of President Roosevelt. During the Korean War, he serves with McCoy in the CIA in Korea, directly under the command of General Pickering.

Like Colonel Banning, Master Gunner Zimmerman is nearing retirement. The Bannings own an island south of Hilton Head. The Colonel and Mae Su (who is something of an entrepreneuse) are planning to build a retirement community on the island aimed at newly-retired field-grade officers of the military. It is implied that following their retirements, the Colonel and the Gunner will form a development corporation, possibly also including Ken and Ernestine McCoy.

=== Major Malcolm "Pick" Pickering, USMCR ===
First Appearance: Semper Fi

On the train from Boston to Philadelphia, McCoy meets a friendly civilian named Malcolm Pickering ("Pick" to his friends). Pick is the son of Fleming Pickering, owner of Pacific and Far East (P&FE) Shipping, and Patricia Foster Pickering, heir to the Foster hotel chain (allowing Pick to stay at the exclusive hotels at no cost). He is a Harvard graduate with a degree in hotel management, having learned the business from the bottom up, starting as a busboy and working up to substitute assistant manager. By his own admission, Pick can do any job in the hotel except pastry chef, claiming he could not master handling pastry dough.

After parting company, McCoy and Pick are reunited as classmates in Officers Candidate School at Quantico, Virginia. Following their graduation and commissioning, they remain in touch, occasionally being involved in the same mission.

While Ken acts as an officer courier just before Pearl Harbor, Pick is accepted for flight training and attends flight school at Pensacola. After earning his wings, Pickering transitions into Wildcats and flies with the Cactus Air Force on Guadalcanal. He qualifies as a fighter ace and is decorated with the Distinguished Flying Cross. He is sent back to the States to participate in a War Bond tour, following which he is promoted to captain, qualifies as an F4U Corsair instructor pilot, and is made the executive officer of VMF-262, serving under his friend William "Billy" Dunn, with whom he had flown at Guadalcanal.

Unfortunately, despite his skill as a pilot Pick suffers from a lack of maturity that repeatedly (and deservedly) lands him in hot water. He is also a ladies' man who is sought out by women, whom he frequently beds without considering the consequences. The combination of immaturity and success with the ladies results in his involuntarily volunteering for the Gobi Operation as copilot of one of the PBY-5A Catalinas. Following the success of that mission, he returns to the United States and continues to fly Corsairs for the rest of World War II, shooting down more Japanese and being shot down himself more than once. Women continue to pursue him, and he sometimes pursues them as well through the course of the series.

Pick was promoted to Major while commanding a USMC Reserve fighter squadron shortly before the Korean War. At the same time, he is working as President and Chief Pilot of Trans-Global Airways, the airline started by his father following the end of the war. His squadron was subsequently activated and deployed to Korea. He gained a reputation for hunting enemy trains, important and dangerous targets, painting locomotive silhouettes on his Corsair to mark each kill, determined to become the Marine Corps' first "Locomotive Ace." Flying combat missions off the escort carrier USS Badoeng Strait, he is shot down over enemy territory after busting yet another locomotive but survives, evades capture, and returns to friendly lines, rescued by Killer McCoy. The experience, coupled with the loss of a lady war correspondent with whom he had been contemplating marriage and subsequently connecting with the widow of another Marine Aviator, seemed to finally mature him.

Nothing is known of Pick Pickering's life following the Korean War.

=== Brigadier General Fleming "Flem" Pickering, USMCR ===
First Appearance: Semper Fi

Fleming Pickering, father of Pick Pickering, is the owner and chairman of Pacific and Far Eastern Shipping, a large and successful worldwide shipping conglomerate. During the First World War, he was a Marine corporal, and was thrice wounded in action during the Battle of Belleau Wood where he was awarded the Navy Cross (the Navy's second-highest award for valor and the equivalent of the Distinguished Service Cross). During his World War I service, he was also awarded the Silver Star, the World War I Victory Medal, and the French Legion of Honor in the rank of Chevalier, plus the Croix de Guerre. (The wound stripes he was awarded during the war were converted to the Purple Heart plus two gold stars in lieu of the second and third awards when the Purple Heart was reauthorized in 1932.)

Following the war, he went to sea and worked his way up to an unlimited Master's license and several ship commands before his father's unexpected death propelled him to the position of Chairman and CEO of P&FE when he was 26. As Chairman of P&FE, he modernized the company, assigning officers where the company needed them instead of permitting them to monopolize one ship. He has no prejudice against officers who "came up through the hawsepipe" rather than graduating from a maritime academy, having worked his way up from Ordinary Seaman to Captain himself. As improvements in cargo-handling equipment are made, they are installed in his ships and their cargo terminals.

Shortly after the attack on Pearl Harbor, then-Secretary of the Navy Frank Knox asked him to take a wartime commission as a Navy Captain, to act as Knox's plenipotentiary in the Pacific theater. During this period of his World War II service he was awarded the Silver Star and his fourth Purple Heart after taking command of a destroyer when her skipper was killed in an air attack. Pickering was aboard the destroyer following service as the Acting G-2 of the First Marine Division on Guadalcanal, which volunteering for the job had seriously annoyed Secretary Knox. General Archer Vandegrift recommended him for the Legion of Merit for his service in that role, which medal was awarded to Pickering by President Roosevelt personally.

Pickering was commissioned a Marine Brigadier General and assigned as the Office of Strategic Services Deputy Director for the Pacific by President Roosevelt in an attempt to force Douglas MacArthur to permit the OSS to operate in his theater of operations. Pickering establishes Special Detachment 16 of the Marine Corps to deal with secret missions in the Southwest Pacific Ocean Area that are not entirely supported by Supreme Commander MacArthur. General Pickering stages the relief of an important Coastwatcher station on Buka; a mission codenamed "Operation Windmill" to evaluate the guerrilla potential of General Wendell Fertig's United States Forces in the Philippines; and Operation Gobi, the establishment of a vitally needed weather station in the Gobi Desert.

He also becomes involved in investigating a possible security breach of MAGIC, the top secret communication system and Japanese codebreaking and analysis operation. It falls to General Pickering to determine if the secret has been compromised, which sends him around the world to make the determination. Being able to read the Japanese coded messages is a priceless asset to the Allies, but one which would evaporate if the Japanese realize their codes, which they consider unbreakable, have been broken.

Following the war, Fleming Pickering resumes his position as chairman and CEO of Pacific and Far East Shipping, but also establishes an airline, Trans-Global Airways, with his pilot son Pick Pickering as its president and chief pilot. While on a visit to Tokyo, he is contacted by Captain Ken McCoy. McCoy gives him an intelligence analysis that concludes the North Koreans are readying an attack on South Korea. General Willoughby, MacArthur's chief of intelligence, has informed MacArthur that all is quiet in Korea, squashed McCoy's contradictory report, and attempted to railroad McCoy out of the Marine Corps.

Pickering takes the report to the director of the CIA, who is skeptical of its accuracy but orders an investigation by his station chiefs. When McCoy's report turns out to be right on the mark, Pickering is recalled to active duty as a USMC brigadier general and is named the CIA's deputy director for Asia, essentially the same position he had held in the OSS. He supports McCoy in establishing a secret intelligence and operations group generally similar to Mac MacMillan's Task Force Able in the Brotherhood of War series. He also stages an operation in support of General MacArthur's Inchon landing, which has a great deal to do with the landing achieving surprise and succeeding.

Nothing further of Fleming Pickering's life or career is known.

=== Major (previously Lieutenant) Robert Macklin, USMC ===
First Appearance: Semper Fi

Robert Macklin, USMC is a "generally slimy creature" and the epitome of everything a good Marine officer shouldn't be. A Naval Academy graduate, he is regarded with contempt by all officers who know him. He worked for then-Captain Ed Banning in China before the war, but proved to be unfit for intelligence work. After writing a self-serving report on the missionary convoy mission where Corporal Ken McCoy earned the nickname "Killer McCoy," Banning sent Macklin home from China with an efficiency report, endorsed by Major Chesty Puller, that should have seen him thrown out of the Corps.

World War II gave him a stay of execution. Assigned to Quantico as a mess officer, he attempted to prevent Ken McCoy from being commissioned. Captain Jack NMI Stecker caught him at it, and the base commander advised him to find another home. He volunteered for the Marine Parachutists, earned his jump wings, and was assigned as a supernumerary officer to the First Battalion of the Para-Marines. Blown off the dock in the assault on Gavutu and wounded in the face and the leg, he had to be pried loose from a dock piling by the corpsmen. He was sent to a hospital in Australia, where Major Jake Dillon recruited him as a "hero" for a war bond tour because while he is a scumbag, he is handsome.

After working on the second "Marine Heroes" war bond tour, Macklin volunteered for the OSS, believing he could salvage his career by so doing. A Marine major who did not know Macklin's record arranged for him to be promoted to captain, and because he was available, he was assigned to "Operation Windmill," the OSS's code name for the mission to General Wendell Fertig in the Philippines.

Despite the objections of several officers in Washington who knew Macklin, Secretary of the Navy Knox ordered him sent on Operation Windmill. However, General Pickering, who was staging the operation, gave Lieutenant McCoy, the mission commander, permission to kill Macklin if he got in the way of carrying out the operation. He was not joking. The feeling of the officers involved in the mission was summed up by Captain Ed Sessions, who answered Navy Lieutenant Chambers Lewis's question "If you hate this guy so much, why don't you just drown him?" with "I think that's probably been considered. If anyone had asked me, I would have voted 'yes.' "

Captain Macklin was sent ashore with the rest of the Operation Windmill team. He expected to be pulled out when the first supply submarine arrived, but instead was ordered to remain with United States Forces in the Philippines under the command of an OSS Major. General William Donovan, Director of the Office of Strategic Services, did not want it known that he had sent a paranoid, delusional screw-up into the field, observing to his Deputy Director for Special Projects, "Get somebody competent there in time to get on the sub" (the submarine carrying supplies to the USFIP). "Somebody senior to Macklin ... if Macklin is the idiot everybody seems to think he is, I don't think he should be in a position to give orders." As a result, Macklin spent the rest of the war with the guerrillas in the Philippines, without command responsibilities, until the islands were liberated.

Macklin, now a major, reappears in Under Fire, working in Personnel at Camp Pendleton. With Captain McCoy about to be involuntarily separated from the Marine Corps, Macklin has several plans to make his remaining time as a Marine officer miserable. After General Dawkins, Deputy Commander of Camp Pendleton, learned of McCoy's pending involuntary separation he instructed the colonel in charge of the involuntary separation program at Pendleton to make the process as swift and painless as possible for the Killer, and to send him on leave until his final day in the service. This derailed Macklin's plans to pay McCoy back for perceived actions that had impeded his advancement and promotion, and causes his superior to question his competence.

The intelligence analysis Captain McCoy had done predicting the North Korean attack came into the hands of the head of the CIA and President Truman, and he was retained on active duty. After Macklin disobeyed the G-1 (Personnel) colonel's order to remain in his office until McCoy, who was on leave prior to separation, was located to be shipped to Washington and duty with the CIA, he is in trouble for disobedience of a direct order. (The Killer's separation had been canceled by the outbreak of the Korean War, though Macklin did not know this.)

When the G-1 figured out Macklin's scheme, it is implied Macklin will be assigned to permanent storeroom inventory duty until he takes the hint and submits his resignation.

== Supporting characters ==
=== Ernestine Sage ===
First Appearance: Semper Fi

Ernestine "Ernie" Sage is the daughter of a pharmaceutical magnate. The Pickering and Sage families are old friends. Patricia Pickering and Ernie's mother were roommates in college. Ernie and Pick have known each other since childhood. Their parents hoped that Ernie and Pick would fall in love and marry, but they ended up being friends rather than lovers. Ernie meets - and falls in love with - Ken McCoy at a party thrown by Pick Pickering shortly before he and Pick were commissioned. She once confessed that half an hour after they met, she knew she was going to marry Ken.

Ernie is an advertising executive at the J. Walter Thompson advertising agency in New York City, working on the American Personal Pharmaceuticals account, the company owned by her father. However, she has worked her way up to creative director on the APP account at the agency on her own. This connection enables her to drop whatever she was doing any time Ken McCoy is in the vicinity (which can be defined as "anywhere on the East Coast"), and to take extended leaves of absence, including one three month period when they cohabited aboard the yacht Last Time in San Diego as McCoy was preparing for the Makin Island Raid while assigned to the 2nd Marine Raider Battalion.

The couple became engaged just before McCoy set out to deliver the Special Channel equipment to USMMCHI (the United States Military Mission to China) and subsequently to stage and carry out Operation Gobi in March 1943. Ken promised he and Ernie would be married on his return from the mission. When we meet Ernie again in Under Fire, she and Captain McCoy have been married for several years. As with her husband, we know nothing about her life during the latter half of World War II, other than they spent a year stationed at Fort Leavenworth while Ken attended the US Army Command and General Staff College, and another year at Marine Corps Base Quantico. Because she is living with her husband in Tokyo while he is assigned to the naval element at Supreme Headquarters Allied Powers, we can presume she is either on an extended leave of absence from J. Walter Thompson or has left the agency, probably the latter. As she pointed out to her father in an earlier book, the income from her trust funds was several times the amount she earned at the ad agency.

When it looked as if the Killer was about to be involuntarily separated from the Corps, she tried to tempt him into joining the Bannings and the Zimmermans in a real estate project which would have had the families building estatelets on land owned by the Bannings on a couple of South Carolina islands. He might have found this a worthwhile thing to do, but was spared the necessity of making a decision when he was called to extended active duty first with the Corps and then with the CIA.

Ernie's desire for children was thwarted by a series of miscarriages. However, after coming under the care of a wise Navy physician and his wiser nurse in Retreat, Hell!, she is successfully delivered of a one month premature healthy baby boy, Pickering Kenneth McCoy.

Nothing further is known of Ernestine Sage's life.

=== Captain George Hart, USMCR ===
First Appearance: Line of Fire

George Hart, a St. Louis homicide detective before the war, was conned into the Corps by a zealous (and unscrupulous) recruiter. During boot camp, he was pulled out of training by Lieutenant Ken McCoy, promoted to Sergeant, and assigned to act as Brigadier General Pickering's personal bodyguard. Hart volunteers to accompany McCoy on the Buka rescue operation, going ashore on the island in a rubber raft and remaining alone on the landing beach while McCoy makes contact with the Coastwatchers they have come to extract and brings them out. He was decorated with the Bronze Star for his contribution to the mission.

Afterwards, he was directly commissioned as a second lieutenant USMCR and nominally assigned as one of General Pickering's aides. At the same time, he acquires a collateral duty as a MAGIC cryptographer with a MAGIC code clearance working with Major Pluto Hon, which precludes his further assignment to field operations. Standing orders forbid individuals with MAGIC clearances from engaging in any activities which might place them at risk of being captured by the Japanese.

Following the war, Hart married and had a couple of children. (It is not clear if his wife is a girl from St. Louis, or a reformed call girl he met who fell in love with him during the war.) He remained in the Marine Corps Reserve, transferring to the infantry. He was promoted to Captain while in command of a reserve rifle company at some point before Korea erupted. After his reserve company was broken up and assigned to the replacement depot for the First Marine Division, he was reassigned to serve with CIA Deputy Director for Asian Operations General Fleming Pickering in the same role he had held in World War II, a combination aide and bodyguard.

The readers can presume that following the end of the Korean War, Hart returned to his job as a detective Captain with the St. Louis Police Department.

=== Patricia Pickering ===
First Appearance: Semper Fi

Patricia Pickering has been the Chairman of the Foster Hotel chain since her father, Andrew Foster, died in the years between World War II and the Korean War. She is the wife of Fleming Pickering and mother to Malcolm ("Pick") Pickering. Notably, while her husband was serving in the Pacific during World War II, she also served as the chairman of Pacific & Far East Shipping, her husband's international company. By the time the Korean War broke out, she appears to be the CEO of Foster Hotels, based in San Francisco but spending a fair bit of time traveling in the course of her duties. She was not at all pleased with Fleming Pickering being recalled to active duty, and at first refused to believe it had been ordered by President Harry Truman personally.

=== Brigadier General Jack (NMI) Stecker, USMC ===
First Appearance: Semper Fi

A Medal of Honor recipient during World War I, Jack (NMI - No Middle Initial) Stecker served with Fleming Pickering and Doc McInerney when they were all enlisted men. Like McInerney, Stecker was offered an appointment to the United States Naval Academy; but he turned it down because he wanted to marry.

Jack Stecker first appears as a seasoned Master Gunnery Sergeant who sees more than a little of himself in Ken McCoy and helps him adjust to life at Quantico. He is commissioned as a Mustang Captain, enabling him to stop persecution of McCoy by 1st Lieutenant Macklin, a self-serving (and dishonest; unusual for a career Marine and Naval Academy graduate) officer McCoy knew in China, who had previously given McCoy problems.

Stecker's oldest son, Jack Jr., was an ensign aboard USS Arizona and was killed during the Pearl Harbor attack. His younger son Dick becomes friends with Pick during aviator training at Pensacola, Florida. The two of them flew together from Henderson Field during the Battle of Guadalcanal until Dick was injured in a crash landing of his Wildcat. While this was happening, Captain Stecker was promoted to Major and given command of the Second Battalion of the Fifth Marine Regiment, which he commanded in combat on Gavutu. When Colonel Frank Goettge, Division G-2 of the First Marine Division, was killed on Guadalcanal, Stecker was assigned as the acting G-2 until a replacement for Goettge could be sent to the island.

Following this, he was promoted to Lieutenant Colonel and reassigned to Australia to help the Corps prepare for the transfer of the First Marine Division there for rest, rehabilitation, and re-equipping. General Pickering learned he was there and co-opted him as an expert on guerrilla warfare. (Stecker had served multiple tours in Nicaragua during the Banana Wars of the 1920s.) Pickering intended to send him into the Philippines as the head of the evaluation mission to U.S. Forces in the Philippines, but following his promotion to full colonel and being informed General Vandegrift wanted Stecker as a member of his personal staff, Colonel Stecker became an advisor to the team being sent in under the command of Lieutenant Ken McCoy.

After being transferred back to Washington to Headquarters, USMC Stecker was promoted to Brigadier General and assigned to the staff of General Alexander A. Vandegrift (Marine Corps Commandant) as a Special Assistant to the Commandant. His duties were not made clear; Vandegrift seemed to use him as a troubleshooter and as the Corps' liaison to the Office of Strategic Services because of his relationship with General Pickering, Deputy Director for Pacific Operations.

General Stecker is not mentioned in any of The Corps's novels set in the Korean War era save in connection with his World War II service.

== Other notable characters ==
- Captain Jim ("Captain Mustache") Carstairs, USMC: Pick Pickering & Dick Stecker's IP (Instructor Pilot) in Pensacola. He reappears in Close Combat, where he got Pickering and Billy Dunn out of a jam with an officious colonel at Pensacola by having them appear at a morale-boosting formation and a mock dogfight in which they whip two of the instructor pilots and their gun camera film teaches the student pilots the reality of combat shooting.
- Brigadier General (previously Lieutenant Colonel) Clyde ("The Dawk") Dawkins, USMC: Commanding Officer, MAG-21 on Guadalcanal. Later Deputy Commander of USMC Camp Pendleton during the early days of the Korean War. Dawkins was loyal to the officers who flew for him in the Cactus Air Force, and to officers and senior noncoms he worked with on classified projects. The Dawk had a soft spot in his heart for Pick Pickering, Billy Dunn, and Ken McCoy, going out of his way to assist them when they had difficulties dealing with higher authority, or (especially in Pick's case) found themselves in trouble.
- Major Jake Dillon, USMCR: former enlisted China Marine sergeant; a Vice President of Metro-Magnum Studios in peacetime with a wide circle of friends, from stuntmen to major movie stars. He returns to wartime duty in the Corps as a Major in the Public Affairs office. Major Dillon led a team of Marine combat correspondents during the Guadalcanal Campaign, and put together a documentary short subject from the footage shot by his men, from the preparations for the invasion to the Marines turning the island over to the U.S. Army to mop up the few remaining Japanese. Following the Guadalcanal campaign, Jake was dragooned into running the second "Marine Heroes" war bond campaign. While back in the United States, he proposed to and was accepted by Veronica Wood, one of Metro-Magnum's biggest movie stars. Dillon was co-opted by General Pickering into the OSS because of his renowned skills as a problem-solver and troubleshooter. His resourcefulness was essential to the successful staging of the relief of the Buka Coastwatcher station, and Operation Gobi.
- Major (previously Lieutenant) Hon Son "Pluto" Do, USA: Signals & Cryptographic officer attached to MacArthur's headquarters in Australia. A graduate and PhD out of MIT, he was recruited into the Signal Corps by Brigadier General H.A. Albright, a cryptographic genius who reverse-engineered the German Enigma machine and set up the Special Channel communications system. Pluto is a gifted intelligence analyst as well as a crypto officer; and frequently is invited to play bridge with General and Mrs. MacArthur, much to the displeasure of the Bataan Gang at SWPOA headquarters.
- Lieutenant Colonel (previously Lieutenant) William Dunn, USMC: Executive officer, and later Acting CO, of VMF-229. After transitioning into F4U Corsairs, Dunn became the CO of VMF-262. In the Korean War, Lieutenant Colonel Dunn becomes the group commander of the three Marine fighter squadrons embarked in the escort carrier USS Badoeng Strait. Billy is a fighter ace, a superb combat commander, and frequently despairs of his scapegrace friend, former wingman, and subordinate aboard the Badoeng Strait, Pick Pickering.
- Eric Feldt, Lieutenant Commander, RAN: director of the Coastwatcher organization.
- Ellen Feller: wife of a Christian missionary in China, married to a homosexual minister. Ellen enters the story when she accompanies McCoy on a convoy sent out to seek intelligence on the Japanese. She seduces and uses McCoy for her own ends, then dumps him. She reappears as a civilian linguist & analyst, first attached to Naval Intelligence in Washington; later attached to MacArthur's Australia headquarters in connection with MAGIC. As a result of her sexual appetites and the military secrets she knows, when her actions threaten the security of MAGIC she is shipped back to the United States and confined to an insane asylum, presumably St. Elizabeth's Hospital in Washington, DC.
- Richardson Fowler: Junior Senator from California. Longtime friend of Fleming Pickering, President Roosevelt describes Richardson, who owns several newspapers and radio stations, as "the chief of my more-or-less loyal opposition."
- Captain (previously Technical Sergeant) Charles Galloway, USMC: Commanding Officer, VMF-229. Gets into serious trouble when he flies a fighter assembled from pieces of several wrecked F4F Wildcats at Pearl Harbor to the USS Saratoga enroute to Wake Island, that is not expecting him. Directly commissioned by Marine Commandant Holcomb personally, he is put in command of VMF-229. Flying Wildcats off Guadalcanal, Galloway became an ace. While there, he flew a modified C-47 Gooney Bird as part of the Buka rescue operation. Following transitioning into Corsairs, VMF-229 becomes the Corps' dumping ground for Marine Aviators regarded as screw-ups, including Pick Pickering. It was said Galloway took pilots no one else could handle and made superb pilots and officers out of them.
- Captain David Haughton, USN: Executive Assistant to the Secretary of the Navy. While his main function is to act as the gatekeeper to those wishing access to Frank Knox, he also is a sort of liaison officer to the Office of Management Analysis and the Office of Strategic Services via General Pickering. His performance in this role is superlative, though he would much rather be at sea in command of a ship, as he wistfully mentions from time to time.
- Lieutenant General (previously Major General) Thomas Holcomb: Commandant of the Marine Corps; later relieved by Lieutenant General Alexander Archer Vandegrift.
- Caroline Howell: Ed Banning's love interest after returning from the Philippines. A rich divorcee, she met Banning at the New York Public Library when he requested all the Shanghai newspapers and magazines from the date the Fourth Marines sailed for the Philippines until the city fell to the Japanese. Despite Banning's telling her at the beginning that he was married and searching for news of his wife, the two begin a friends with benefits relationship that develops into a love affair. Had Ludmilla not survived, it seems likely Caroline and Banning would have married. However, when Banning is transferred to USMMCHI in connection with Operation Gobi (with the possibility of learning the fate of his wife), Caroline angrily breaks up with him.
- Frank Knox: wartime Secretary of the Navy.
- Staff Sergeant Thomas McCoy, USMCR: Ken McCoy's ne'er-do-well younger brother. A Marine Raider, he was promoted to sergeant, possibly as a reward for shooting up a Kawanishi H8K seaplane with a Boys anti-tank rifle so badly it crashed on takeoff during the Makin Island Raid. He was awarded the Medal of Honor for valor above and beyond the call of duty on Guadalcanal at the Battle of Bloody Ridge. After Guadalcanal, he was nicknamed "Machinegun McCoy" by the press and sent back to the United States for a war bond tour, with two tough Marine gunnery sergeants to keep him in line. (Thomas McCoy is possibly based on Staff Sergeant "Manila John" Basilone, the hero of the Battle for Henderson Field, whose actions in that battle were very similar to McCoy's on Bloody Ridge as described in the books.) There is no further information presented in any of the later books. It is not known if Sergeant McCoy survived World War II. If he was in fact based on Manila John Basilone, the chances are he did not.
- Carolyn McNamara: Girlfriend of Charles Galloway. An upperclass divorcee who dumped her banker husband after he was caught in flagrante delicto with his chippy of a secretary, she meets and immediately falls in love with Galloway in much the same way Ernie Sage fell for Ken McCoy. Although it is plain the two are in love, it is not clear when or if they will marry. As there is no mention of Galloway following the successful staging of Operation Gobi, the question remains open.
- Major General (previously Brigadier General) D.G. "Doc" McInerney, USMC: Director of Marine Corps Aviation. He and Fleming Pickering were two of Sergeant Jack Stecker's corporals in World War I, and were present when Stecker earned his Medal of Honor. Offered an appointment to Annapolis following the war, he accepted it and graduated (probably in the Class of 1922). He got into Marine Aviation early, and fought alongside then-Sergeant "Big Steve" Oblensky in Nicaragua during the Banana Wars. He kept in touch with both Stecker and Pickering over the years, eventually becoming Director of Marine Corps Aviation. In that role, he rescued Pick Pickering from the role Personnel had had in mind for him, which was as a mess and officer's club officer, arranging for him to become a pilot. After advising Fleming Pickering there was nowhere in the Corps his skills could be put to good work, he was pleased when Pickering became Secretary of the Navy Knox's eyes and ears. He worked with General Pickering on a number of occasions, most notably in connection with the Buka rescue operation and Operation Gobi. Following the events of In Danger's Path, nothing more is known of General McInerney's life and career.
- Lieutenant John Moore, USMCR: cryptographer & intelligence analyst attached to the Office of Management Analysis. The son of Christian missionaries, he was born and raised in Japan. He speaks fluent Japanese and knows the Japanese culture and mind as only someone immersed in it for years can know it. Pulled from boot camp and promoted to sergeant, Moore is sent to Brisbane to assist Pluto Hon. Moore deduces what MAGIC is and becomes a cryptographic analyst. He is seduced by Ellen Feller, who has also been sent to assist Pluto. When their relationship becomes inconvenient to Feller, she fails to prevent his transfer to Guadalcanal (where, as someone with knowledge of MAGIC, he should never have been sent) as an intelligence analyst to replace a lieutenant killed in action. He suffers shrapnel wounds while on a patrol to gather information about enemy intentions. When General Vandegrift learns Moore knows what MAGIC is, he is immediately medevacked to Australia. He is treated for his wounds by a nurse who falls for him, and he for her. Given the affectionate nickname of "Gimpy" by his fellow dungeon-dwellers because he walks with a limp, he is a valuable member of the intelligence staff. When the decision was made to provide Chiang Kai Shek with MAGIC capability, Moore is reassigned to Chungking under Colonel Ed Banning as an cryptographer and analyst. Nothing further is known of Moore's career, although it may be presumed he married his nurse/lover. While stationed in Australia, they could not marry because their wedding would have resulted in her being transferred Stateside due to the regulations in effect at the time.
- Brigadier General (previously Lieutenant Colonel) Fritz Rickabee, USMC: Commanding Officer, Office of Management Analysis. Appropriately for a senior intelligence officer, Griffin gives the reader little background information on Rickabee. Presumably a graduate of the Naval Academy, when the readers meet him he is already the head of Management Analysis, a cover name for a secret intelligence gathering and analysis organization which reports directly to the Secretary of the Navy. Although their existence is known to the head of Marine Intelligence and Management Analysis works with them, they answer directly to the Secretary. Rickabee built the organization up from nothing and is very careful who is recruited into it. He was one of the officers who press-ganged Ken McCoy into OCS, because he could do more for the Corps as an officer than an enlisted man. When Fleming Pickering was transferred from the Navy back into the Marines at the direction of President Roosevelt and assigned to head up the Office of Management Analysis, Rickabee was seriously annoyed. His annoyance did not last long, however, once he got to know Pickering and realized that despite the fact he was a general he still thought like a Marine sergeant. The two achieved mutual respect. Pickering was responsible for Rickabee's promotion to Brigadier General, succeeding him as the head of Management Analysis, and for maintaining the independence of Management Analysis. Colonel William Donovan of the OSS wanted the organization subsumed into the Office of Strategic Services, reasoning that all responsibility for worldwide intelligence belonged to him; and was a longtime friend of FDR. Pickering convinced the President that Management Analysis would be more use to the nation as an independent group than it would as cogs in the OSS. The office retained its independence, continuing to report directly to the Secretary of the Navy. Following the successful establishment of Station Nowhere in the Gobi Desert, Rickabee is not seen again in the series.
- Major (previously Lieutenant) Edward Sessions, USMC: officer attached to the Office of Management Analysis. A graduate of the Naval Academy, we first meet him as a lieutenant in Semper Fi. He is an intelligence officer masquerading as a Christian missionary who is given the standard Japanese humiliate-the-round-eyes treatment before coming under Ken McCoy's wing and successfully completing his mission. Promoted to captain, he returns to the United States. After McCoy's graduation from OCS and assignment to the Office of Management Analysis, Sessions helps him with the transition to commissioned status. Over the course of the World War II portion of the series, he assists McCoy in preparation for a number of his assignments, working behind the scenes. He is married with one son. This sometimes bothers McCoy, as Sessions and his wife Jeannie are the epitome of family bliss that Ernie Sage frequently throws up at him as arguments in favor of their getting married. Nevertheless, Ed and Ken are close.
- First Lieutenant Dick Stecker, USMC: Jack Stecker's son and Pick Pickering's buddy. The second son of Jack and Elly Stecker (his older brother died aboard the Arizona on December 7, 1941), he chose to attend West Point instead of following his brother to Annapolis. (Qualified children of recipients of the Medal of Honor are entitled to admission to any of the service academies without an appointment and with no regard for quota requirements.) Following his commissioning as a second lieutenant, USMC, he reported to NAS Pensacola, where he met and roomed with Pick Pickering. The two were rated as Naval Aviators in F4F Wildcats and flew with the Cactus Air Force on Guadalcanal. All of the Marine pilots were aware of the shortage of fighter planes on Guadalcanal and went to extremes to bring their planes back to Henderson Field. Stecker tried to stretch a glide in a crippled Wildcat, and the airplane tumbled when a tire blew. Seriously injured in the crash, Stecker was repatriated to the States and sent to a naval hospital specializing in orthopedics in the Philadelphia area. When last seen, he had improved to the point he could walk with a cane, and was working to get physically fit and pass the flight physical. It is not clear whether he returned to flying duty.
- Major General Alexander Archer Vandegrift: Commanding General, 1st Marine Division; later served as Commandant of the Marine Corps.
- Captain (previously Lieutenant) James Weston, USMC: A Catalina pilot who was stranded in the Philippines just after the war began. With the tacit permission of his commanding officer, Weston escaped to Mindanao before the fall of Corregidor to fight as a guerrilla. Picking up other soldiers who had refused to surrender along the way, he links up with Brigadier General Wendell Fertig and becomes the intelligence officer of the U.S. Forces in the Philippines. Sent out of the Philippines to brief Generals Pickering and MacArthur by Killer McCoy (acting on Pickering's orders), he is decorated with the Silver Star. While on leave in Hawaii, he meets Charley Galloway and is rated in the Corsair. He is then caught up in the military system and sent to be evaluated before being sent on leave in accordance with standard procedures for repatriated prisoners of war. He meets and falls for a Navy nurse, and while being requalified in Catalinas meets the widow of an old friend, the daughter of an admiral, and they fall in love as well. Torn between the two, Weston volunteers for Operation Gobi, where he serves as the pilot of one of the two Cats used on the operation. His women troubles are exacerbated by Pick Pickering, his copilot, who is in love with the admiral's daughter but was spurned. Following the success of Operation Gobi, Weston is repatriated, his women problem unresolved. (Pick Pickering, prior to learning the second woman in Weston's life was the same one at Pensacola he was in love with, offered this advice: "There is a very simple solution. You let them know you are diddling someone else. Or two or more somebody elses. You get a lot of tears, and on occasion, a slapped and/or scratched face, and they invariably take ten minutes to tell you what an unmitigated sonofabitch you are, but you're off the hook." Following Pick's advice would leave him free to marry Martha Culhane, the admiral's daughter in Florida. It seems probable this is how Weston solved his woman problem.) We learn nothing further of Weston's career following Operation Gobi.
- Ludmilla Zhivkov: Ed Banning's White Russian wife. Daughter of a former Imperial Russian general who is also a count of the Russian aristocracy. After the collapse of the White Army following the Russian Civil War, she and her parents had to flee what was now the Soviet Union to Shanghai, China, becoming stateless persons. She inherits the title and rank of countess upon the death of her father. She earns her living as a private language teacher, and met Ed Banning when he wished to improve his Chinese and learn Russian. Following her escape from Japanese-occupied China after marrying Banning, she and their son Edward Edwardovich settle in with Banning's parents in Charleston, South Carolina. After the war, while Banning was Commandant of the Marine Barracks in Charleston and also instructing at The Citadel, she assists one of Banning's cadets with a report on the Imperial Russian General Staff, and points out her father in a photo in one of his books to him. Shortly afterwards, Ludmilla Banning becomes known to the entire Corps of Cadets, with profound respect, as "the Countess". We learn in Retreat Hell! that Mrs. Banning has been diagnosed with, and is being treated for, breast cancer.
- General Joseph Stilwell, Chief of the U.S. Military Mission to China and Chief of Staff to Generalissimo Chiang Kai-shek.
- Lieutenant (previously Corporal) Robert Easterbrook, USMC: a short, skinny enlisted combat correspondent on Guadalcanal, fresh from Parris Island and forced to grow up fast in the heat of combat while assigned to the 2nd Marine Raider Battalion. His ears redden with anger or embarrassment, earning him the nickname "the Easterbunny" among his peers (much to his irritation). After he returns to the US for a war bond tour, he is directly commissioned by the USMC Director of Public Affairs for the incredible combat footage and photos he took on Guadalcanal. He was also identified in a national news story by Thomas "Machinegun" McCoy as "the bravest man on Bloody Ridge," whom McCoy had believed to be dead, for his attempt to carry his mortally wounded captain to an aid station, in the words of Gunny Zimmerman, while "trying to carry his officer down that fucking hill with every fucking Jap this side of Tokyo shooting at him." Taken onto General Pickering's staff, Easterbrook is qualified as a MAGIC cryptographer and accompanies Colonel Banning to USMMCHI to assist him with the heavy workload of MAGIC traffic at General Stilwell's headquarters, where it is implied he remains for the rest of the war.
- Lieutenant General Edward Mallory "Ned" Almond, USA: Commander of X Corps in Korea.
