= Chick Parsons =

American businessman, diplomat, and WWII veteran

Charles Thomas Parsons Jr.
- Born: April 22, 1902; Shelbyville, Tennessee, U.S.
- Died: May 12, 1988 (aged 86); Pasay, Metro Manila, Philippines
- Relatives: Stephen Jurika (brother–in–law)
- Military career
- Allegiance: United States
- Branch: United States Naval Reserve
- Service years: 1929–unknown
- Rank: Lieutenant commander
- Nickname: Chick
- Campaign Participation: World War II; *Philippine Islands operation *Leyte operation *Luzon operation *Manila Bay-Bicol operations *Escort, antisubmarine, armed guard and special operations
- Awards: Navy Cross (2) Distinguished Service Cross Bronze Star Medal Philippine Medal of Valor Philippine Legion of Honor Order of St. Sylvester
- Other work: Merchant mariner Civil Servant businessman Panamanian Consul general

Charles Thomas "Chick" Parsons Jr. (April 22, 1902 – May 12, 1988) was an American businessman, diplomat, and decorated World War II veteran.

== Pre-war years ==
Parsons was born in Shelbyville, Tennessee, moved frequently, and spent part of his youth (beginning at the age of 5) in Manila, before returning to Tennessee. Charles Parsons' interest in the Philippines occurred because two of his uncles had gone there to seek their fortune. Their letters home ignited his imagination and sense of adventure. As a result, he took courses in shorthand and Spanish while in school in Chattanooga. He graduated from Chattanooga High School. After graduating from school, he held a job as a court reporter for a year or two. Then in 1921, at the age of 19, he arrived in Manila after working across the Pacific as a crewman on a freighter. His knowledge of shorthand and Spanish allowed him to qualify as secretary to U.S. Governor-General Leonard Wood. For three years, Parsons traveled throughout the Philippines with Wood and got to know the Filipino people, learning their languages and customs, as well as picking up knowledge of Philippine geography. All this would serve him well when he later went into business for himself and served as a U.S. naval officer during the war years.

A postgraduate course in commerce and his increased fluency in the local dialects allowed Parsons to find work with the Philippine Telephone and Telegraph Company. Then in 1927, he went to Zamboanga on Mindanao as a buyer of logs and lumber for the Meyer Muzzell Company. This company, financed by Mayor James Rolph of San Francisco, exported timber to the United States. This job required Parsons to travel extensively throughout Mindanao, learning details about the island and its inhabitants that would save his life many times during World War II.

The Philippines had become like home to Parsons. While at Zamboanga, he met and married Katrushka (Katsy) Jurika, daughter of Stefan Jurika, a naturalized Czechoslovak, and Blanche Anna Walker of Oxnard, California. At that time, Parsons was 30 years old and Katrushka was only 15, but their marriage was solid and quickly produced four sons – Michael, Peter, Patrick and Jose. Parsons moved his family to Manila in 1929, where he took a job managing the Luzon Stevedoring Company as "boss stevedore," which operated a fleet of tugboats, chrome and manganese mines, and other activities. Other business interests included managing the North American Trading and Importing Company, which produced alcohol from molasses discarded from sugar refining, and the La Insular Cigar and Cigarette Factory, one of the largest tobacco interests in the Philippines and owned by Spanish royalty. Ironically, due to a Philippine law requiring a 60% American or Filipino interest in a foreign company operating in the Philippines, Parsons also became president of Nihon Kogyo Kabushiki Kaisha, a Japanese mining company.

In 1929, according to Ingham (1945), he also made another important career decision. He joined the United States Naval Reserve as a lieutenant (jg), and took active duty with the Pacific Fleet whenever possible. However, Peter Parsons, his son, states that his father joined the Naval Reserve in 1932, and was assigned to submarines.

By the fall of 1941, Parsons was 39 and anticipating an early retirement, as well as spending more time enjoying his hobby of polo. In 1937, he helped organize the Los Tamaraos Club with the Elizalde brothers in Tambo, Parañaque. Parsons was proud to be the "only polo-playing stevedore in the world." Then, on the night of December 8, 1941, a fellow reserve officer woke Parsons up and informed him that the entire personnel and equipment of the Luzon Stevedoring Company had been taken into the United States Navy. Parsons was immediately sworn into active duty as a full lieutenant. The Japanese had bombed the Philippines.

== World War II ==
=== Under Japanese occupation ===
During the early days of the war, Lieutenant Parsons worked resupplying American submarines which came into Manila Bay or relocating supplies to Bataan and Corregidor. As the Japanese army approached Manila at the end of 1941, Parsons spent New Year's Eve destroying what was left of the Navy's supplies in Manila, as well as the contents of the warehouses belonging to his various companies. Although recently promoted to lieutenant commander, he also burned his Navy uniforms, as he did not retreat to Bataan with the rest of the American-Filipino forces. Before World War II broke out in the Philippines, Parsons' wife, sons, and mother-in-law Blanche Jurika had not been evacuated with other military dependents, as the Philippines was their home. In early January, they awoke one day to find a Japanese sentry at the gate to their house, along with a sign stating that the house was now the property of the Imperial Japanese government.

Since 1940, some Danish ships had been interned in the Philippines, as Denmark had been conquered by Germany. When America entered the war, these ships were seized and registered under the Panamanian flag. Because of this, Parsons had added another title to his list when he agreed to serve as the temporary Panamanian consul until one could be dispatched from Panama. As a result, he had identification papers, with corresponding documents in Manila's government house, identifying him as such. While watching the Japanese sentry, it suddenly occurred to Parsons that he could use this position to obtain diplomatic immunity as a citizen of a neutral country. From that moment on, he and his family spoke only Spanish while they were in Japanese-controlled territory. That same day, their home was designated as the Panamanian Consulate by the Japanese, and they continued to live there in relative freedom. Before the war, Parsons had worked with numerous Japanese citizens, some of whom had become his friends, who knew of Parsons' position in the United States Naval Reserve. At least one such acquaintance, "Pete" Yamanuchi, was now a Japanese naval officer. However, none of them informed on him to the occupying Japanese forces.

Due to his knowledge of the Philippines and his previous business activities, Japanese businessmen offered Parsons a position as manager of several mines, some of them his own. Parsons kindly refused, citing his diplomatic position and other responsibilities. However, Charles and Katsy Parsons, and Blanche Jurika used their time in Manila to obtain information on the Japanese and their activities, to communicate, and even visit, with American and Filipino soldiers who had fled to the nearby hills and jungles, and to obtain information on American prisoners held by the Japanese. Charles Parsons often did this dressed as a Filipino peasant, the disguise enhanced by his deeply-tanned skin caused by years in the tropical sun.

However, after the Doolittle Raid on Japan in April 1942, the attitude of the Japanese occupying forces changed toward all Caucasians, even Germans and those from non-belligerent nations. Parsons was among those arrested and held for a period of time and tortured, then released because of his Panamanian diplomatic status and permitted to leave with his family in June 1942. Once his family was safely settled in the United States, he volunteered his services to help the Allies in the Pacific, reporting to General Douglas MacArthur.

Parsons' extensive knowledge of the Philippines and its culture plus an established network of trusted contacts made it possible for him to travel throughout the vast archipelago and communicate effectively with Filipino and American guerrillas, escaping enemy detection. During the Japanese occupation, Parsons undertook eight secret submarine missions to the Philippines, as well as several more by air, supplying guerrillas with arms, radio equipment, medicine and other supplies. His first such mission was to Mindanao to supply and evaluate Lieutenant Colonel Wendell Fertig's guerrilla organization. He also organized and maintained extensive intelligence networks and coastwatcher radio stations throughout the country, which transmitted information on Japanese troop movements to the Allies.

In 1944, Parsons returned to Leyte nine days ahead of MacArthur to help prepare the guerrillas for the invasion. Later, he accompanied the first troops into Manila, where he arranged supplies for the starving civilians newly liberated from the Santo Tomas Internment Camp. After the war, Parsons resumed his business activities in Manila and assisted in rebuilding the country.

== Baseball ==
Chick Parsons established the Manila Bay Baseball League (MBBL), in the early 1940s serving as its first president. It was the most prestigious amateur baseball competition in the Philippines at the time.

Parsons is the first president of the Philippine Amateur Baseball Association (PABA) which was established in 1954. He is also the inaugural president of the Baseball Federation of Asia also founded in the same year.

== Recognition ==
For his distinguished military and public service, Parsons was awarded the Distinguished Service Cross, two Navy Crosses, the Bronze Star, the Order of Saint Sylvester from the Vatican, the Orden de Vasco Núñez de Balboa from Panama, the Philippine Legion of Honor, and the Armed Forces of the Philippines Medal of Valor. He never requested the Purple Heart for the several times he was wounded in skirmishes with Japanese troops, once by a saber that opened up the right side of his neck.

In 2004, the ballroom of the Embassy of the United States, Manila, was named after Chick Parsons.
