= Francisco Ortega =

Francisco Ortega may refer to:

- Francisco Ortega (bishop) (died 1602), Roman Catholic prelate
- Francisco Ortega (footballer, born 1996), Argentine defender for Atlético de Rafaela
- Francisco Ortega (footballer, born 1999), Argentine midfielder for Club Atlético Vélez Sarsfield
- Francisco Ortega (politician), Filipino lawyer and politician
- Francisco Ortega (writer) (born 1974), Chilean writer
- Francisco Ortega III, Filipino politician
- Francisco Robles Ortega (born 1949), Mexican prelate of the Catholic Church
