= Chilean science fiction =

Science fiction literature in Chile

Science fiction in Chile began in the late 19th century with the publication of the books El espejo del mundo (Mirror of the World) in 1875 by the Englishman Benjamin Tallman, about the modernization of Valparaíso and Santiago, and in 1877 of Desde Júpiter (From Jupiter) by Francisco Miralles, which recounted a trip to the planet and back.

Later, 20th-century authors contributing to this literary subgenre included Pedro Sienna, Vicente Huidobro, Juan Emar, Enrique Araya, Armando Menedín, and Ariel Dorfman. However, it was in the decade of 1950, with the publication of Los altísimos (The Highest) by Hugo Correa, that Chilean science fiction really emerged; his work was translated into more than ten languages, and printed in the famous Magazine of Fantasy and Science fiction, being prized by Ray Bradbury.

Today, important authors include:

- Jorge Baradit, author of Synco, Ygdrasil and Lluscuma, currently working on retelling Chile's History from a new perspective.
- Francisco Ortega, author of the best-selling novel Logia (Lodge), and the recently published Historia Monstruosa de Chile (Monstrous History of Chile).
- Alicia Fenieux, author of dystopian novels, including Amor de clones (Clones love), which won the Best New Novel Award of 2016 by the Chilean National Council for Culture and the Arts.
- Diego Muñoz Valenzuela, author of Flores para un Cyborg (Flowers for a Cyborg); founding member of the literature promoting corporation Letras de Chile.
- Sascha Hannig, journalist and international political analyst, author of Allasneda series of steampunk novels.
- Michel Deb, author of the Orbe Saga, Los sueños de GN-I (The Dreams of GN-I), and most recently Front 243.
- Leonardo Espinoza Benavides, physician writer, author of Más espacio del que soñamos (More Space Than We Dream), and Adiós, Loxonauta (Goodbye, Loxonaut).

== Cinema ==
The short film Renacimiento by Inti Carrizo-Ortiz, set in the universe of Star Wars, received the Audience Choice Award Lucasfilm SWFMC 2010.

Nowadays, film director Jorge Zavala Berríos has started working with science fiction writers to produce book trailers.
