= Jorge Baradit =

Chilean writer

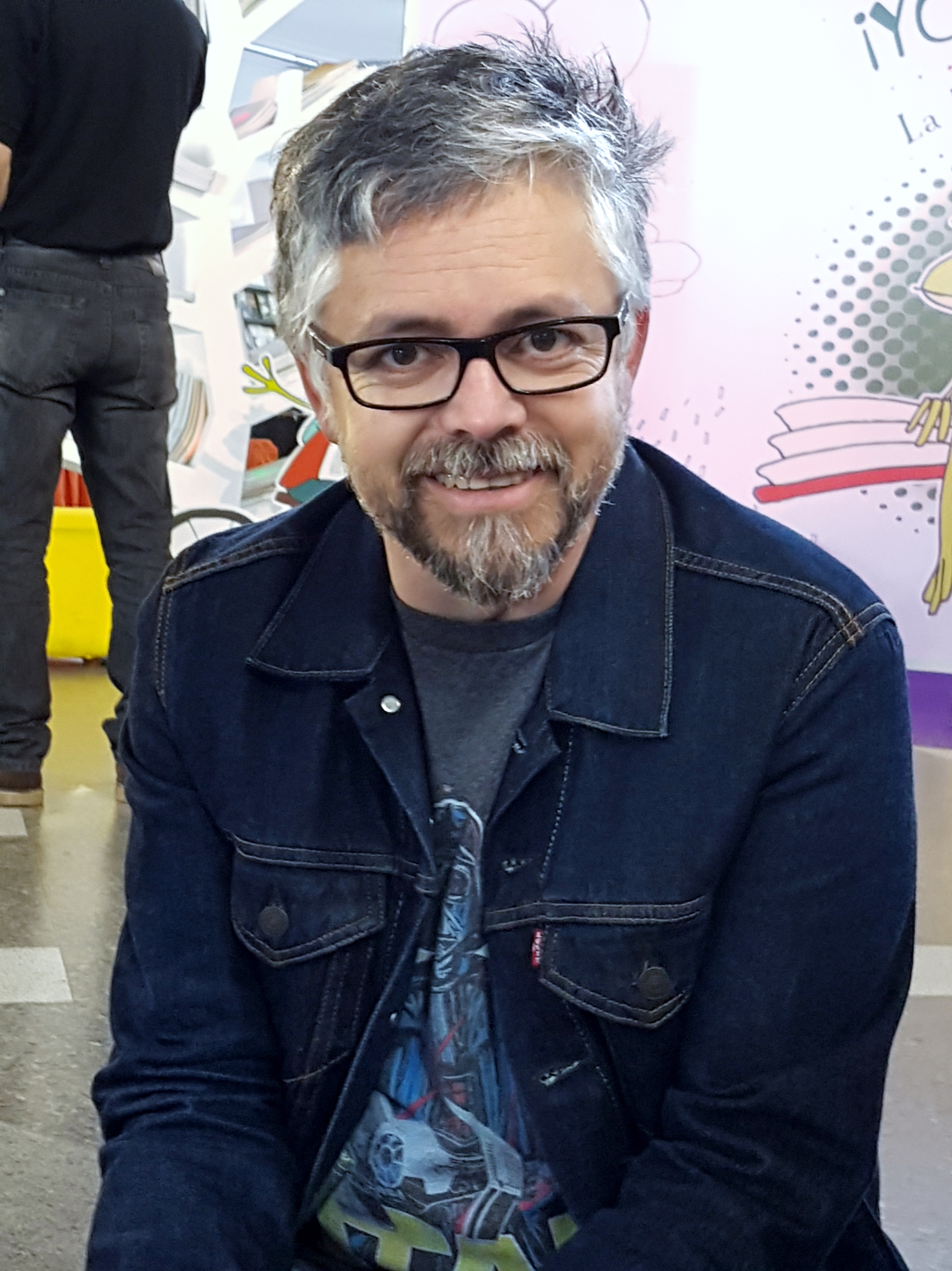
- Baradit at the 27 October 2017 FILSA

Member of the Constitutional Convention
- In office 4 July 2021 – 4 July 2022
- Constituency: 10th District

Personal details
- Born: Jorge Marcos Baradit Morales; 11 June 1969 (age 57) Valparaíso, Chile
- Education: Viña del Mar University
- Occupation: Writer
- Writing career
- Notable work: Historia secreta de Chile
- Notable awards: Santiago Municipal Literature Award (2014)

Jorge Marcos Baradit Morales (born 11 June 1969) is a Chilean writer, politician and podcaster. He is the author of the bestselling popular history trilogy Historia secreta de Chile.

== Biography ==
Jorge Baradit spent his childhood and early adolescence in Valparaíso, where he formed a punk rock band called Trato Bestial, which performed in underground concerts in Valparaíso Region from 1986 to 1991. Coming from a lower-middle-class family, he was educated in public schools and at the Rubén Castro school in Viña del Mar. He studied one year (1987–1988) of Architecture at the Pontifical Catholic University of Valparaíso and later Graphic Design (1988–1994) at Viña del Mar University, where he graduated. He has been dedicated to literature since 2005.

== Literary career ==
=== Fiction ===
He debuted in literature with Ygdrasil (published in Spain in 2007), "a story set in a futuristic Mexico, where a Chilean mercenary named Mariana accepts the most dangerous missions that will take her through a digital form of hell. It shows a world full of organic technology taken to the limit, an imbunche, dead soldiers who reincarnate as communication systems, and a shaman who orbits the Earth."

A year later he wrote a short prequel of Ygdrasil, Trinidad, for which he won the award of the Polytechnic University of Catalonia.

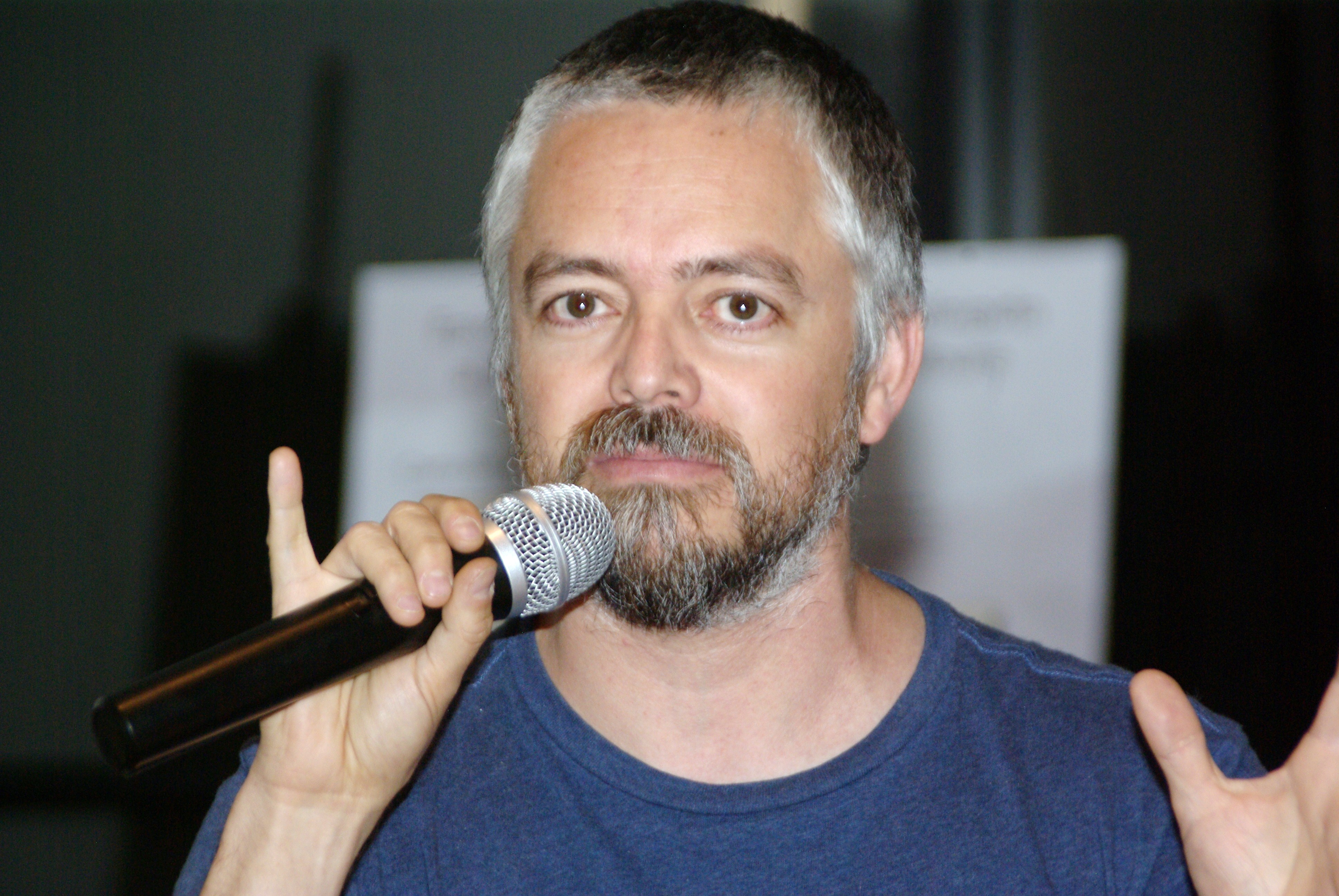
Baradit at the GAM, April 2015

Miquel Barceló, editor of the NOVA collection of Ediciones B, in which both works appeared, described Ygdrasil as a "revolution in science fiction in Spanish", and characterized Baradit's writing as cyber-shamanism, a definition that is not to the Chilean's liking – "I prefer Magical Realism 2.0. Macondo already has fiber optic networks, but his shamans still take ayahuasca," he said at the time.

From 2006 to 2008, he maintained the Ucronía Chile blog, a project that invited writers, illustrators, photographers, and videographers to twist Chilean history at any point and under any criteria. From that experience came the book CHIL3: Relación del Reyno (Ediciones B, 2010), for which he invited Francisco Ortega, Álvaro Bisama, and Mike Wilson to act as co-editors. The volume anthologizes the best entries of the blog, added to new contributions by writers such as Carlos Labbé, Edmundo Paz Soldán, Claudia Apablaza, and Rodrigo Fresán.

Baradit published Synco in 2008 (in 2012 he began to work on a graphic version of the novel), an alternate history of democratic socialism that develops after 1973, with Augusto Pinochet appointed by Salvador Allende to replace General Carlos Prats. "It stops the military coup, the socialist government consolidates and creates the first cybernetic state, a universal example, the true third way, a miracle." It is based on the unfinished Project Cybersyn.

The following year Kalfukura appeared, which tells the story of a humble child who undertakes an odyssey throughout Chile to find a great ancestral treasure of metaphysical order. Unlike the typical style of Baradit, this book is closer to an adventure novel and is aimed at children and young people. About it, Baradit himself says, "I want to revive our myths, take them out of pedagogy and the museum and give them new life."

During the Santiago International Book Fair (FILSA), in November 2011, he launched his first graphic novel, Policía del karma, drawn by Martín Cáceres, where he recounts the actions carried out by a dystopian police force in an alternative Santiago that pursues people for crimes committed in their previous lives. The work won the FIC Award for best cover, best writer, best cartoonist, and best comic of the year 2011.

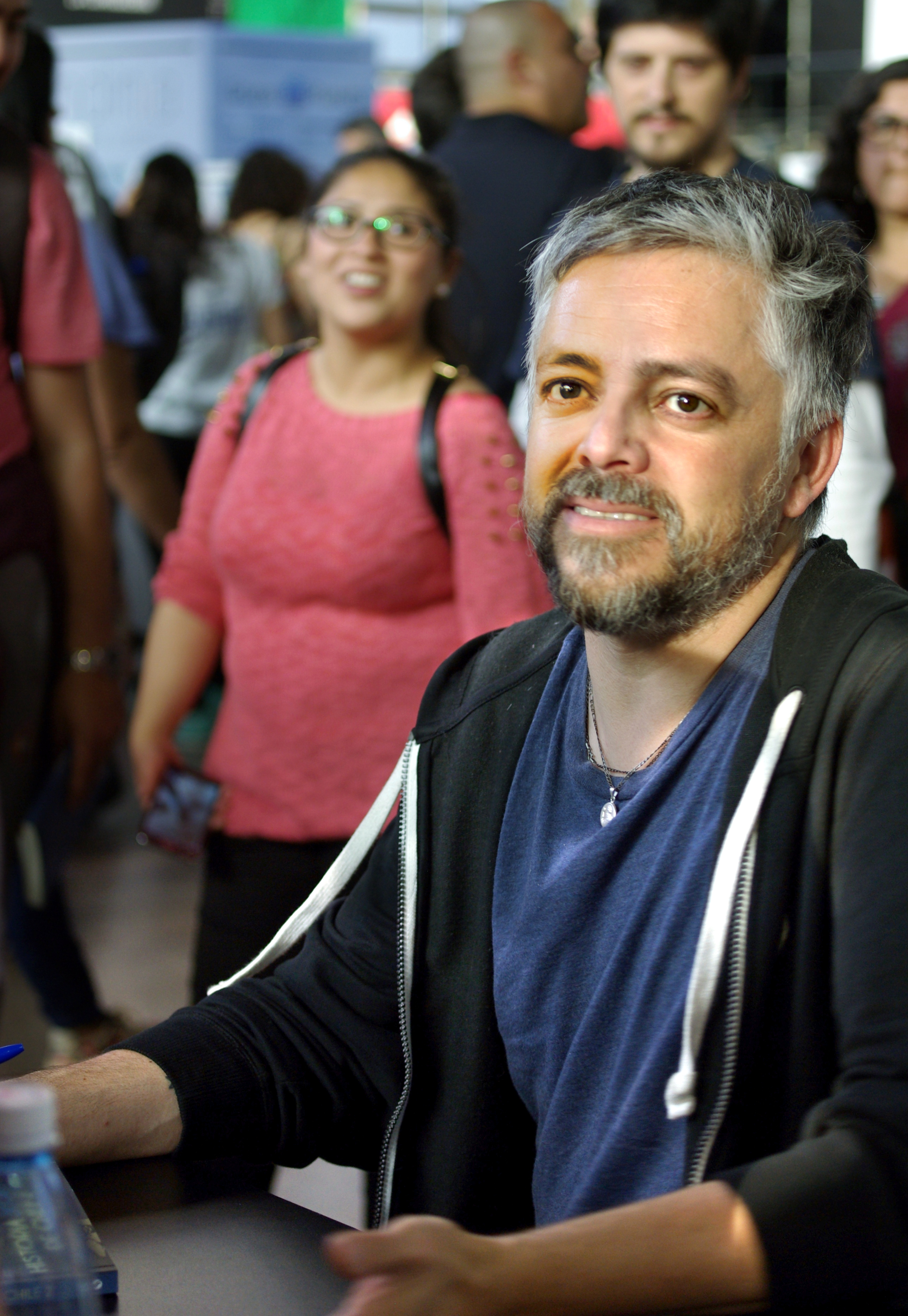
Baradit signing books, FILSA 2016

In May 2012 he created, again with illustrations by Cáceres, Lluscuma, a fantasy graphic novel with elements of alternative worlds, time travel, hallucinations, psychological violence, alternate history, and delirium, set in 1977, during the event known as the case of Corporal Valdés (a supposed abduction by extraterrestrials), and 2013 in the context of issues related to death and torture during the military dictatorship of General Augusto Pinochet. The work was published weekly in the print edition of the newspaper La Segunda from May to November 2012. The following year it was released in a book with the text "revised, corrected, expanded, and edited with the calm and care that only months of work in the laboratory can give."

He launched his first book of short stories, La guerra interior, in March 2017, in which he included 22 stories that span his career from 2003 to 2016 and that are a heterogeneous sample of his literary output.

Baradit has been identified with the renewal movement of Chilean literature called "Freak Power", which also comprises narrators such as the aforementioned Bisama, Ortega, Wilson, and Sergio Amira. He has stood out for the use of digital tools and social networks in the development and diffusion of his works in different online, written, and audiovisual platforms, in collaboration with musicians, videographers, illustrators, and his own readers.

=== Nonfiction ===
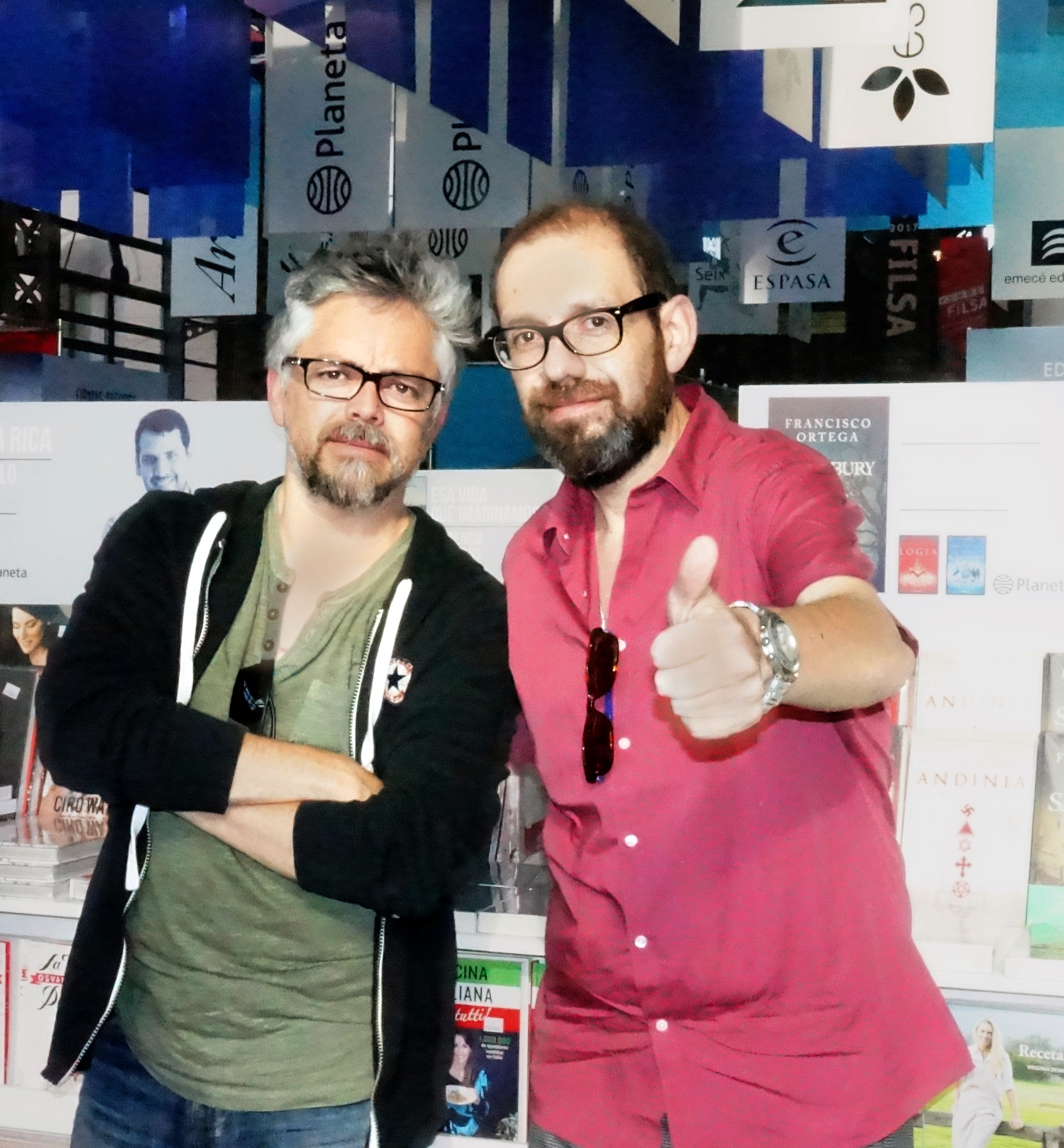
With Francisco Ortega at the FILSA 2017

Published in July 2015, Historia secreta de Chile (Editorial Sudamericana) was the first volume of a trilogy on hidden or unknown aspects of official Chilean history. The book became a bestseller in his country, with 8,000 copies sold a month after its launch and a total of 80,000 in just under a year. La Tercera spoke of the "triumph of Chilean nonfiction" in relation to this success, which includes contemporary authors such as Carlos Tromben, Felipe Portales, María Olivia Mönckeberg, and María José Cumplido.

However, the success of Historia secreta de Chile was not free from controversy – some historians criticized the quality of its documentation, while others such as the 2016 National History Award winner Julio Pinto and the 2006 winner Gabriel Salazar supported the publication. In the following two years, Baradit released the remaining volumes of the trilogy, with covers as provocative as the first (which had portrayed Arturo Prat as a spiritualist figure, endowed with a third eye). The second showed Bernardo O'Higgins with dark glasses, emulating the famous photograph of Augusto Pinochet after the military coup, alluding to the fact that the independence leader was the country's first dictator. The third figure featured Gabriela Mistral with a tattoo reading "Doris", plus a piercing in her nose.

By September 2017, the first two titles of the trilogy had together sold a record 200,000 copies.

== Television ==
From 2015 to 2016, Baradit participated as a panelist of the nighttime series Mentiras verdaderas (broadcast by La Red), where he commented on various facts from the unofficial history of his country.

In 2017, he assumed the leadership of his own program: Chile Secreto, a hybrid between documentary and investigative series where he toured the country, reviewing historical facts hidden in the official history. Transmitted by Chilevisión (CHV), it premiered on 21 May (Day of Naval Glories) with a chapter dedicated to the hero Arturo Prat, and was the leading broadcast in its timeslot – according to data delivered by CHV, between 7:59 and 9:00 pm it achieved an average of 9.5 ratings points, followed by Mega with 9.3 and Canal 13 with 9.

== Activism ==
The author actively participates in citizen activism and it is common to see him supporting social causes related to civil rights movements. He does so by attending marches, presentations, spots and through social networks, supporting causes such as the gender equality movement and the pro-abortion in three grounds movements.

== Awards and recognitions ==
- Chosen as one of the 100 Young Chilean Leaders by the El Mercurio magazine Sábado
- 2007 UPC Award for short science fiction novel for Trinidad
- 2008 CORFO Award for the audiovisual project Synco, with the production company Sobras
- 2011 FIC Award for best Chilean graphic novel, best cover, and best writer for Policía del karma
- 2014 Santiago Municipal Literature Award for young adult novel for Lluscuma
- 2016 CORFO Award for the audiovisual project Voces, with the production company Fábula (presented by Enrique Videla)
- 2017 CORFO Award for the audiovisual project Policía del karma, with the production company Fábula

== Works ==
- 2005, Ygdrasil, Ediciones B (Spain edition, 2007; corrected luxury edition, 2009)
- 2007, Trinidad, Ediciones B
- 2008, Synco, Ediciones B
- 2009, Kalfukura. El corazón de la tierra, Ediciones B
- 2010, Mind fuck guerrilla, anthology of stories, fragments, and published and unpublished articles from 2002 to 2010; Ediciones Proxy, Santiago
- 2011, Policía del karma, graphic novel with drawings by Martín Cáceres, Ediciones B
- 2012, Lluscuma, serial novel with drawings by Martín Cáceres, newspaper La Segunda; in book with revised text; Ediciones B, 2013
- 2015, Historia secreta de Chile, Sudamericana
- 2016, Historia secreta de Chile 2, Sudamericana
- 2017, La guerra interior, stories, Plaza & Janés. Containing 22 texts:
  - "La conquista mágica de América", "Sant AG 2021", "Metro", "Sobre los selk'nam", "Los vampiros", "Time War Lluscuma", "Mariana", "Plebiscito", "El miedo", "Policía del karma", "Soviet", "El hijo del hombre", "El sueño de Contreras", "Los insaciables", "Angélica", "Tunguska", "Innergy", "Gemini geminos quaerunt", "Enterrrado", "El día S", "Inflexión", and "Estrella de mañana"
- 2017, Historia secreta de Chile 3, Sudamericana
- 2018, La dictadura, Sudamericana
