= Tim Barlow =

English actor (1936–2023)

- Born: Michael John Leigh Barlow; 18 January 1936; Blackpool, Lancashire, England
- Died: 20 January 2023 (aged 87)
- Occupation: Actor
- Years active: 1954–2023

Michael John Leigh Barlow (18 January 1936 – 20 January 2023) was an English actor who performed many small roles in a variety of films, television programmes, and plays, under the stage name Tim Barlow or Timothy Barlow.

== Life and career ==
Barlow was born 18 January 1936. His father, a solicitor, died when he was five years old. Barlow was raised by his mother. After graduating from school at the age of 18, he entered the British Army, and spent 15 years there.

Barlow left the army in 1969 to pursue a career in acting, receiving advice from Trevor Nunn and Sir Laurence Olivier. He wrote and performed a one-man show in which he described how he came to the decision to go into the acting profession. He previously had much success with another one man show entitled "My Army" in which he described his life in the British army in the 1960s. This toured for many years.

One of his most notable roles was playing Mr. Morrow, a blind man allergic to his guide dog in The Tall Guy alongside Jeff Goldblum. He played Tyssan in the Doctor Who serial Destiny of the Daleks. He also appeared on stage with the Royal Shakespeare Company and as the BFG at the Polka Theatre in Wimbledon, and on screen as Mr Treacher in Hot Fuzz. In 2007 he played an Ancient Blind Oracle in the HBO series Rome.

Barlow lost his hearing in the 1950s when testing a high velocity Muzzle Rifle, most likely an L1A1 prototype known as the X-8 Self Loading Rifle (SLR), for the British Army, until 2008, when surgery to fit a cochlear implant allowed him to recover some of his hearing. His experience of having the cochlear implant fitted was detailed in an episode of BBC Radio 4 programme It's My Story, called "Earfull - From Silence into Sound".

In 2016 he performed in Him, an autobiographical work about memory, ageing and the art of theatre, created by theatre-maker Sheila Hill, with videographer Hugo Glendinning, and musician Sebastiano Dessanay.

He died on 20 January 2023, aged 87.

== TV and films ==
Year	Title	Role	Notes
1975	Brannigan	Customs Officer	Uncredited
1976	The Eagle Has Landed	George Wilde (Publican)	
1978	Who Is Killing the Great Chefs of Europe?	Doyle	
1979	Doctor Who	Tyssan	4 episodes: Destiny of the Daleks
1979	Grange Hill	Mr. Stiles	TV series; 2 episodes
1983	Privates on Parade	Commanding Officer	
1984	The Adventures of Sherlock Holmes	Biddle	TV series; 1 episode
1989	The Tall Guy	Mr. Morrow	
1993	Anchoress	Old Pilgrim	
1993	Inside Victor Lewis-Smith	Mr. Lobley	
1996	Mary Reilly	Vicar	
1997	The Ugly	Police Photographer	
1998	Les Misérables	Lafitte	
1998	Cousin Bette	De Forzheim	
1999	A Kind of Hush	Max	
1999	Tube Tales	Elderly Drunk	Segment: "Steal Away"
2000	The Nine Lives of Tomas Katz	Mr. Browne	
2001	Kiss Kiss (Bang Bang)	Doctor	
2001	The Emperor's New Clothes	Bargee	
2004	The Rocket Post	Hector McDougal	
2004	Teeth	Ernie	Short
2005	Kingdom of Heaven	Old Guard	Director's cut
2005	Lie Still	Man in Pub	
2005	Mike Bassett: Manager	Sir Denzil	
2007	Rome	Ancient Blind Oracle	TV series; 1 episode
2007	Hot Fuzz	Mr. Treacher	
2008	10,000 BC	The Pyramid God	
2008	Lezione 21	Simrock	
2012	Cockneys vs Zombies	Samurai Head Slice Zombie	
2012–2014	Derek	Jack	TV series; 14 episodes
2013	The Christmas Candle	Oliver Barber	
2014	Autómata	Organizer	
2016	Sherlock	Wilder	TV series; 1 episode
2017	My Cousin Rachel	Seecombe	
2018	The Alienist	Mr Kreizler	TV series; 1 episode
