= Ads Infinitum =

1996 British television series

- Created by: Victor Lewis-Smith, Paul Sparks
- Starring: Victor Lewis-Smith
- Country of origin: United Kingdom
- Original language: English
- No. of episodes: 15

Production
- Running time: 10 min
- Production company: Associated-Rediffusion

Original release
- Network: BBC Two
- Release: 19 December 1996 – 30 October 2000

Ads Infinitum was a British television comedy sketch/archive series, co-written and presented by Victor Lewis-Smith that originally ran on BBC Two, beginning with a 10-minute pilot episode in December 1996 that focused on adverts for Christmas toys, two series would soon follow. A series of 6 episodes in 1998, and a second series of 8 episodes in 2000. The series would look at old TV and cinema adverts, some footage previously unseen on UK TV, which Lewis-Smith would usually make fun of.

== Episodes ==
Series	No.	Episode	Air date
Pilot	1	"Christmas Presents Past"	19 December 1996
1	2	"Comics and Magazines"	26 October 1998
1	3	"Consumer Cack"	2 November 1998
1	4	"Public Information Films"	9 November 1998
1	5	"Cinema Food Ads"	16 November 1998
1	6	"Leominster Local Cinema Ads"	23 November 1998
1	7	"Ads Infinitum Awards 1998"	30 November 1998
2	8	"Airlines"	11 September 2000
2	9	"Holidays in Britain"	18 September 2000
2	10	"Holidays Abroad"	25 September 2000
2	11	"British Kewzeen"	2 October 2000
2	12	"Superheroes"	9 October 2000
2	13	"Old-Age Pensioners"	16 October 2000
2	14	"Buygones"	23 October 2000
2	15	"Ads Infinitum Awards 2000"	30 October 2000

== See also ==
- TV Offal
- 1998 in British television
- 2000 in British television
