= Michael Wilson =

Michael or Mike Wilson may refer to:

== Arts and entertainment ==
- Michael Wilson (director) (born 1964), American theater director
- Michael Wilson (guitarist) (born 1952), Jamaican guitarist for Burning Spear from 1977 to 1984
- Michael Wilson, bassist with Logan
- Michael Wilson, drummer with Dave Dee, Dozy, Beaky, Mick & Tich
- Michael Wilson (presenter), British journalist and business presenter
- Michael Wilson (writer) (1914–1978), Hollywood screenplay writer
- Michael G. Wilson (born 1942), producer and screenwriter of James Bond films
- Michael Henry Wilson (1901–1985), British anthroposophist and founder of Sunfield Children's Home, Clent
- Michael J. Wilson (born 1966), American screenwriter
- Mike Wilson (executive) (born 1970), American entrepreneur in the video game industry
- Mike Wilson (filmmaker) (born 1976), American documentary filmmaker
- Mike Wilson (writer, born 1974), American-Argentine writer
- Mike "Hitman" Wilson, American DJ and producer

== Politics and law ==
- Michael Wilson (Australian politician) (born 1934), member of the South Australian House of Assembly, 1977–1985
- Michael Wilson (Canadian politician) (1937–2019), Canadian politician and diplomat
- Mike Wilson (Kentucky politician) (born 1951), member of the Kentucky Senate
- Mike Wilson (South Dakota politician) (born 1959), member of the South Dakota House of Representatives, Democratic nominee for lieutenant governor in 2002
- Michael D. Wilson (born 1953), Hawaii judge

== Sports ==
=== Gridiron football ===
- Mike Wilson (offensive lineman) (born 1955), American football offensive lineman
- Michael Wilson (offensive lineman) (born 1947), gridiron football offensive lineman
- Mike Wilson (wide receiver) (born 1958), American football wide receiver for the San Francisco 49ers
- Michael Wilson (wide receiver) (born 2000), American football wide receiver for the Arizona Cardinals
- Mike Wilson (American football/baseball) (1896–1978), American baseball and football player

=== Other sports ===
- Michael Wilson (basketball), former player of the Harlem Globetrotters and the University of Memphis, also known as "Wild Thing"
- Mike Wilson (basketball) (born 1959), American basketball guard
- Mike Wilson (SMU basketball), American basketball player
- Michael Wilson (Australian footballer) (born 1976), former Australian rules footballer for Port Adelaide Football Club
- Michael Wilson (New Zealand footballer) (born 1980), New Zealand association football player
- Mike Wilson (outfielder) (born 1983), American baseball player
- Mike Wilson (ice hockey) (born 1975), Canadian ice hockey defenceman
- Mike Wilson (boxer) (born 1983), American boxer
- Michael Wilson (cyclist) (born 1960), Australian cyclist
- Mike Wilson (skier) (born 1986), American freeskier
- Michael Wilson (cricketer) (1940–2015), New Zealand cricketer
- Mike Wilson (kart racer) (1959–2026), English-born Italian kart racer

== Others ==
- Michael Wilson (guide) (born 1972/73), Queen's Guide to the Sands, Morecambe Bay, England
- Michael Wilson, protagonist of the video game Metal Wolf Chaos

== See also ==
- List of people with surname Wilson
- Mick Wilson (disambiguation)
