= Fernando Rivas Inostroza =

Chilean journalist

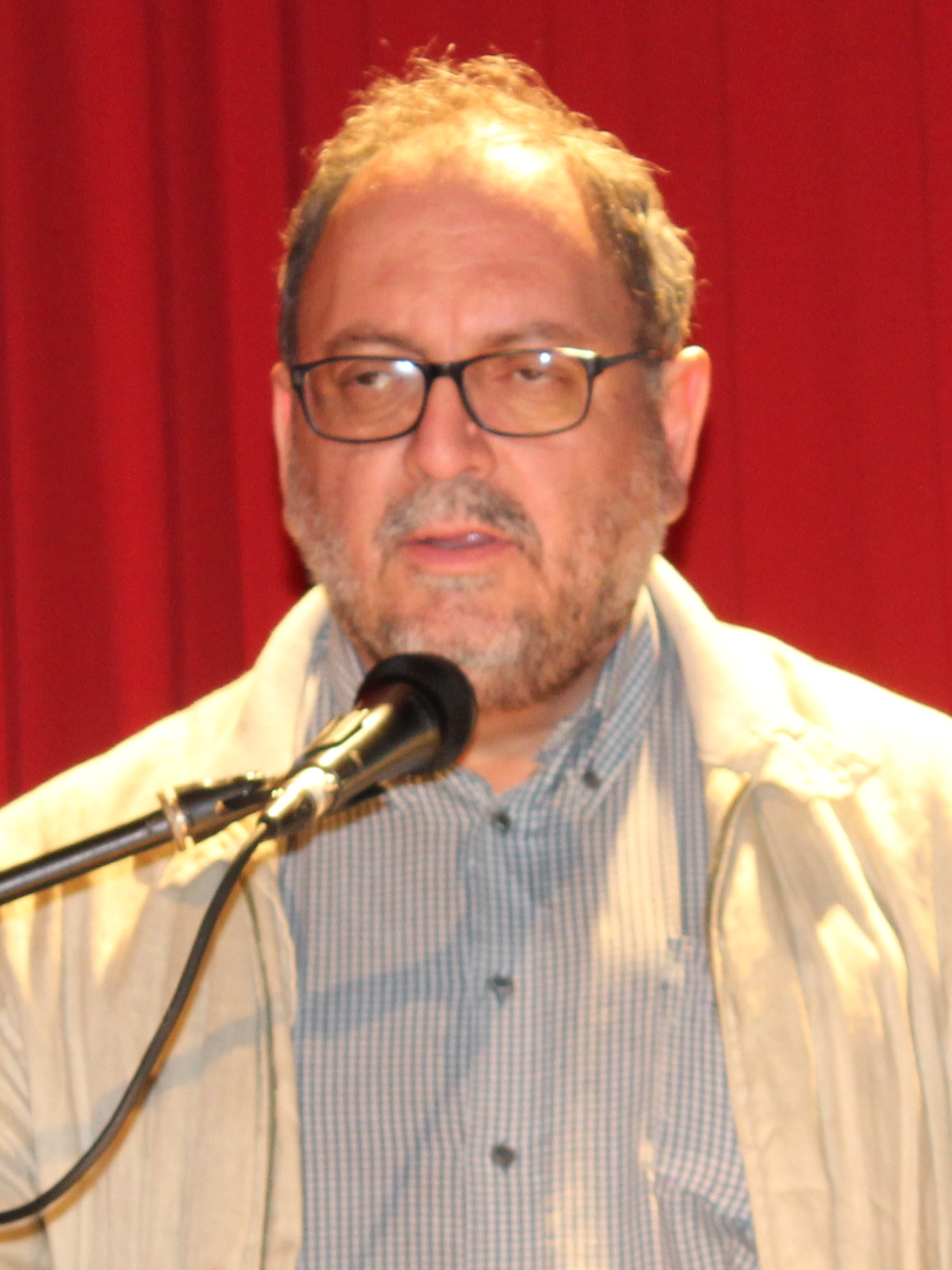

Director of the Pontifical Catholic University of Valparaíso School of Journalism
- In office 2010–2017
- Succeeded by: María Pilar Bruce Hoyuelos

Personal details
- Born: 25 March 1964 (age 62) Santiago, Chile
- Education: University of Chile (BA); Pontifical Catholic University of Valparaíso (MA); University of Viña del Mar (PgD)
- Profession: Journalist historian

Fernando Enrique Rivas Inostroza (born 25 March 1964) is a Chilean journalist.

== Biography ==
He was born on 25 March 1964 in Santiago, the capital of Chile. He completed his high school education at the Instituto Nacional General José Miguel Carrera in 1979.

In 1980, Rivas entered the University of Chile School of Journalism, where he graduated in 1985. Then, he completed a master's degree in history at the Pontificia Universidad Católica de Valparaíso, which he completed in 2001. In 2003, meanwhile, he completed a diploma in foreign affairs at the University of Viña del Mar (UVM). In 2014, he obtained a PhD in history at his alma mater.

In 1985, he began his career as a journalist at Estrella del Mar radio in Ancud, where he worked for two years. From 1987 to 2003, he worked for El Mercurio de Valparaíso, where he served as editor and head of several sections (including the Internet department). In 2000, he was professor of writing and journalistic technique at the University of La Serena.

First, Rivas taught radio lessons at the UVM (1994–1997). Then, from 2000 to 2003, he had chair of courses like Introduction to Journalism or Interview and Writing Workshops. By the other hand, in 1995, he joined the Pontificia Universidad Católica de Valparaíso School of Journalism, where he was director in the 2010s and has been a full-time professor since 2004.

From 2015 to 2018, he was alternate director of the Latin American Federation of Social Communication Faculties (FELAFACS), Southern Cone Region.
