= Inside Victor Lewis-Smith =

British comedy TV show

- Created by: Victor Lewis-Smith; Paul Sparks
- Starring: Victor Lewis-Smith; George Raistrick; Nickolas Grace; Annette Badland; Moya Brady; Roger Lloyd-Pack; Tim Barlow
- Country of origin: United Kingdom
- No. of episodes: 6

Production
- Running time: 25 min

Original release
- Network: BBC2
- Release: 1 November – 13 December 1993

Inside Victor Lewis-Smith is a British comedy sketch/sitcom series that ran on BBC2 from November to December 1993. It was co-written and presented by comedian and writer Victor Lewis-Smith. It ran for six episodes.

== Premise ==
The series was set in the Frank Bough Memorial Zip Injury Wing at St. Reith's Hospital for Distressed Broadcasters, a BBC-owned hospital. One of its residents is an apparent caricature of Lewis-Smith, who lies immobilised in a "comic coma" after a motorcycle crash.

In an attempt to stimulate his brain, the hospital staff play old BBC programmes to him via a TV monitor plugged into his life support machine - but for some unexplained reason, he also starts playing the programmes back, albeit with his warped sense of humour. This effectively makes him a one-man transmitter, which the BBC plan to use as an economical replacement for their current staff and equipment.

Meanwhile, inside Lewis-Smith's body, Lewis-Smith himself embarks on a guided tour of his own bloodstream in a miniature taxi, accompanied by an annoying taxi driver who doubles as a narrative linking device in-between sketches.

The series is presented as "Part sitcom, part sketch show linked around an apparently comatose Victor Lewis-Smith and the goings-on inside his unconscious head."

== Regular sketches ==
The opening to each episode involves a spoof BBC Two ident, which often involves the COW Globe ident from 1985-1991 in some way shape or form.

=== The I-Spy Book of... ===
A humorous guide on Lewis-Smith's own take on the world, presented as a visual equivalent of an I-Spy Book. Subjects include animals, fairgrounds, teenagers and the police.

=== Something To Cheer You Up ===
Taking place during the hospital scenes, Lewis-Smith's wife brings him something to cheer him up while he's unconscious, often related to the sketch which is due to follow or has just followed. She then follows it up with an anecdote, often related to how the item came into her possession.

=== Kith & Kin ===
This sketch is a spoof documentary on the lives of two people with the same last name. Those featured were Bertrand and Jane Russell, Henry and Windy Miller, Thora and Douglas Hird (sic), Norman and Elisabeth Schwarzkopf, Siegfried and Vidal Sassoon, and Queen Elizabeth II and Barbara Windsor. Each sketch contains an appearance by a Melvyn Bragg style character called Mervyn Briggs.

=== The Secret Life of Television ===
Like Kith & Kin, this sketch is a spoof documentary supposedly going behind the scenes of television. Subjects include eccentrics, The Black and White Minstrel Show, Hogmanay programmes, table tennis and interlude films. A similar sketch was previously featured in Lewis-Smith's contributions to TV Hell.

=== You're The Star ===
A parody of You've Been Framed!, this sketch features clips starring Lewis-Smith's co-writer Paul Sparks and Lewis-Smith's friend David Dallison, in which they fake humorous injuries accompanied by a voiceover of Lewis-Smith's impression of Jeremy Beadle. This sketch was previously featured in Lewis-Smith's contributions to TV Hell.

=== The Singing Telegram ===
Played by the Square Pegs, the Singing Telegram are a barbershop quartet who sing a melody to the tune of Goodbye, My Coney Island Baby that often begins with "We're The Singing Telegram..." and is often related to the sketch due to follow or has just followed.

=== Mr. Lobley's Latest Invention ===
Another one of the residents of St. Reith's is Mr. Lobley, who often attempts to describe to the Nurse his latest idea of an invention which he plans to complete when he leaves. Often, the Nurse isn't that impressed by the idea, so she attempts to kill or injure him in some way until the Consultant interferes. Like the Something To Cheer You Up sketches, these take place during the hospital scenes.

=== The Magical Voice of Frank Sinatra ===
A series of spoof advertisements, advertising albums by Frank Sinatra that include songs focusing on various topics, like university dropouts, dyspepsia, feminism, the working classes and Alzheimer's.

=== Revenge ===
This series of sketches involves Lewis-Smith mocking various musicians by dubbing over the soundtrack of their performances with his own soundtrack of badly played (on purpose) songs. Those mocked included Nigel Kennedy, James Galway, John Williams, The Swingle Singers, Julian Lloyd Webber, Roger Whittaker and Jimi Hendrix. A similar sketch was also featured in Lewis-Smith's later series TV Offal.

=== The BBC Big Band's Old TV Theme Tunes ===
Each episode contains a musical interlude by the BBC Big Band, who perform various classic TV show theme tunes from the Music Therapy Room in St Reith's. The theme tunes included The Money Programme, Nationwide, The Saint, The Baron, Danger Man and Tomorrow's World.

=== My Alter Ego Must Lash Out ===
The show would close with Lewis-Smith's trademark of prank calling various places, such as the Monopolies Commission, a branch of McDonald's in Moscow or the Belgian Consulate, with initial good graces, before becoming more and more rude as the conversation continued, with the credits often rolling below or beside the footage of the call.

== Cast ==
- Victor Lewis-Smith – Himself, other roles
- George Raistrick – Taxi Driver, Postman, other roles
- Nickolas Grace – Consultant, Frank Sinatra, other roles
- Annette Badland – Nurse, other roles
- Moya Brady – Wife, other roles
- Roger Lloyd-Pack – BBC Policeman, other roles
- Tim Barlow – Mr. Lobley

The show also features appearances by Paul Sparks, David Dallison, Stan Harrison, Chris Langham, John Hodgkinson and Phil Hammond.

== Episodes ==
No.	Title	Original release date
1	"The Money Programme"	1 November 1993
2	"Nationwide"	8 November 1993
3	"The Saint"	22 November 1993
4	"The Baron"	29 November 1993
5	"Danger Man"	6 December 1993
6	"Tomorrow's World"	13 December 1993

== Reception ==
The series "which satirized hospital dramas and contained sketches from his Radio 1 series, all linked by an annoying taxi driver" is described as "a bizarre collection of surreal skits wrapped in a situation comedy format." while The Guardian recalls in Lewis-Smith's obituary that he "never really managed to break through to a wider television audience, although shows such as Inside Victor Lewis-Smith, Ads Infinitum, and TV Offal were never less than original and wickedly funny."
