= Mick Wilson =

Mick Wilson may refer to:

- Mick Wilson (born 1962), member of English art rock band 10cc
- Mick Wilson, co-founder and past member of British trance group Tilt
- Mick Wilson, co-founder of English post-punk band Acrobats of Desire

== See also ==
- Michael Wilson (disambiguation)
