= Victor Lewis-Smith =

British producer and critic (1957–2022)

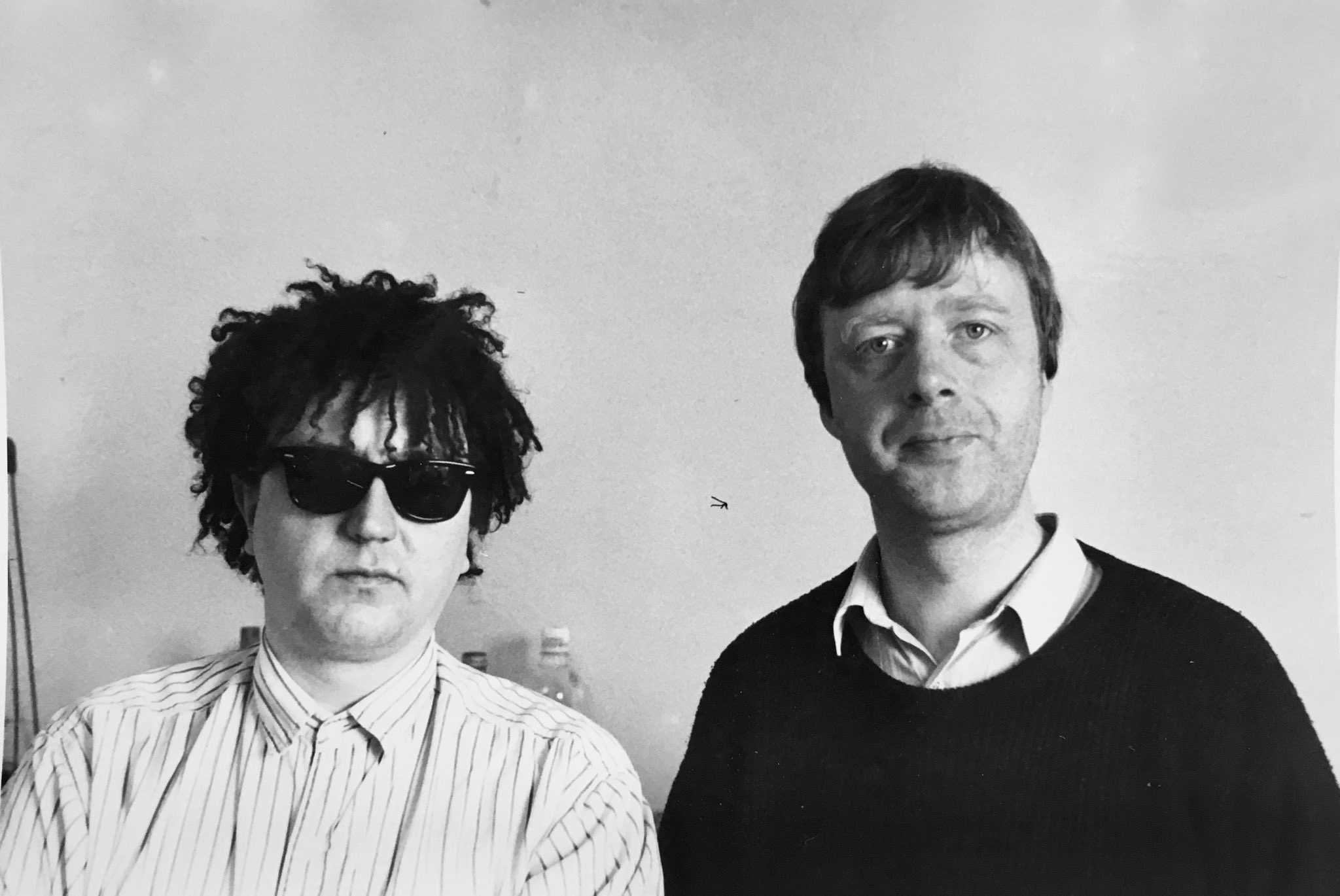
- Lewis-Smith (left) in 1989, with writing partner Paul Sparks
- Born: Victor Lewis Smith; 12 May 1957; Ilford, Essex, England
- Died: 10 December 2022 (aged 65); Bruges, Belgium
- Occupations: Writer, broadcaster
- Spouse: Virginia Stewart Duff
- Children: 1

Victor Lewis-Smith (12 May 1957 – 10 December 2022) was a British film, television and radio producer, a television and restaurant critic, a satirist, and a newspaper columnist. He was executive producer of the ITV1 Annual National Food & Drink Awards. He was an alumnus of the University of York and received an honorary doctorate from the University of Westminster in November 2008.

== Early life and personal life ==
Lewis-Smith was born in 1957, the son of a neurosurgeon, and grew up in Chadwell Heath, Essex. According to The Telegraph, he "never knowingly gave an interview discussing his parents, background or childhood." He was married to Virginia Stewart Duff.

He worked for Radio Medway before going on to study music at the University of York, where he presented the "bizarre student TV show" Intimate Freshness under the name Damien Filth. During his time as a student he was arrested, convicted and fined £20 for causing a public disturbance after climbing up scaffolding at York Minster in the middle of the night and reciting the adhan, the Muslim call to prayer, from a ledge, having previously played "I Do Like to Be Beside the Seaside" on the cathedral's organ. When asked in the magistrates' court hearing if he had anything to say, he replied: "All my left-wing friends told me they were beaten up by the police when they were in custody. But nothing of the sort happened to me. What am I to tell them when we next meet?".

== Career ==
=== Production company ===
Lewis-Smith owned a film, television and radio production company called Associated Rediffusion Productions Limited, having in 1990 acquired the rights to the name and logo of the original company Associated-Rediffusion.

=== Television ===
==== TV ====
Lewis-Smith contributed to a number of productions for British television:

- In 1989, he wrote and presented 18 episodes of Buy-gones for Club X on Channel 4, and contributed sketch scripts for Central's Spitting Image
- Up Your Arts (compiled from his contributions to Channel 4 show Club X; 1992)
- Inside Victor Lewis-Smith (1993) in which he is a virtually unseen character, the series taking place inside the head of a man having old BBC programmes played into his life support machine
- TV Offal on Channel 4 (pilot 1997; series 1998)
- TV Offal Prime Cuts on Channel 4; 1999
- Ads Infinitum for BBC Two (pilot 1996; two series, 1998 and 2000)
- Z For Fake for BBC Two in 2001 (8 programmes)
- The Barftas for Channel 4 in 2002
- The Vicious Circle for Channel 5 (UK) in 2002
- Has anyone seen Junfan? (2002, ITV pilot)
- Here's a Piano I Prepared Earlier for BBC Four (2005, narrator and producer)
- Jake on the Box for BBC Four (2006, narrator and producer)

==== As producer ====
On 1 January 2021, the Sky Documentaries Channel aired "Steve McQueen: The Lost Movie", presented by David Letterman.

Lewis-Smith's documentary The Undiscovered Peter Cook was the first in a series transmitted on BBC Four in November 2016. In December 2018, Lewis-Smith made three more documentaries in the style of The Undiscovered Peter Cook for Sky Arts, this time concerning Peter Sellers, Kenneth Williams and Tony Hancock. Lewis-Smith was executive producer of a series of controversial documentaries presented by Keith Allen for Channel 4. This included biographies of Nick Griffin, then leader of the British National Party, Lottery winner Michael Carroll, the TV cook Keith Floyd (who died two hours before the programme was transmitted), and the "child prodigy" Lauren Harries.

Lewis-Smith was executive producer of a series of 44 television programmes called 21st-Century Bach - The Complete Organ Works. The series started on BBC Two in June 2003 and ran for six years. It has since aired on Sky Arts. John Scott Whiteley was the organist.

From 2010, Lewis-Smith was executive producer of In Confidence, a series of one-to-one interviews featuring leading figures from the arts. Presented by Laurie Taylor, this production for Sky Arts was well received in a television review by the Daily Telegraph, noting: "In an age of soapy soundbites, Sky Arts hour-long interview strand is a serious attempt to delve deeper into its subjects." Guests included Peter Maxwell Davies, Lily Allen, Richard Dawkins, Cleo Laine, Christopher Hitchens, Peter Hitchens and Stephen Fry.

=== Radio and recording ===
From 1983 to 1985 Lewis-Smith produced and presented the Sunday-morning programme Snooze Button for BBC Radio York. Following this he became a producer at BBC Radio 4, working on Start the Week and Midweek: during his stint on the latter he recruited cockney comedian Arthur Mullard as a stand-in host for regular presenter Libby Purves.

In 1986 he became a regular contributor to Radio 4's Colour Supplement and Loose Ends, developing a writing partnership with long-time collaborator Paul Sparks, also a former music student at York, and producing sketches combining music, special effects and toilet humour. During this time he won nine awards at the 1988 Independent Radio Advertising Awards (including the gold) for his Midland Bank student campaign.

In 1989 he made his first programme for BBC Radio 1, with producer John Walters, under the pseudonym Steve Nage.

Lewis-Smith's company made two series for BBC Radio 1 of the comedy show Victor Lewis-Smith, for which he won a Best Comedy Radio Programme award in the 1990 British Comedy Awards. A compilation of his spoof calls peaked at No.1 on the iTunes comedy chart on 27 July 2006. They attracted some controversy at the time of their first broadcast: in The Sunday Times on 15 April 1990, Paul Donovan opined Lewis-Smith's hoaxes were "repugnant". However, The Guardian's Lucy Mangan described some of the recordings as being "touched with genius". Writing about Lewis-Smith's hoax phone calls in The Times Higher Education, Sally Feldman observed: "He chooses his victims carefully, pricking the pompous and the powerful in the very best traditions of satire. His favourite target is the media, his pranks intended to expose their smugness, their laziness and their gullibility."

One of his prank calls was featured on the intro of Towers Of Dub on The Orb album U.F.Orb.

He released two recordings of his comedy, a CD Tested on Humans for Irritancy (Virgin Records, 1991) and a cassette Nuisance Calls (ARTV, 1996).

=== Writing ===
In the 1980s Lewis-Smith took over from Julie Burchill in writing weekly columns for Time Out magazine. He also wrote weekly columns during the same period for the short-lived Sunday Correspondent and The Mail on Sunday (where he often substituted for Burchill), as well as Esquire magazine. He was a food critic for The Independent and restaurant critic for Harpers & Queen magazine from 1995 to 1998, as well as contributing to The Guardian, where he combined comedy writing and food criticism.

In 1992, Lewis-Smith began a long association with the London Evening Standard, contributing television reviews along with other writers, as well as occasional restaurant reviews and travel articles. It was announced in June 2007 he would be retiring from his television column.

Beginning in 1993, he was compiler of the "Funny Old World" column of bizarre news items in Private Eye, where he replaced Christopher Logue. In 2011 he was living in Cumbria and never visited the magazine's London office. He wrote a weekly page for the Daily Mirror for some years until 2003. From autumn 2004 to April 2005 he was resident restaurant critic of The Guardian's Saturday magazine supplement.

His books include Buy-Gones and Inside the Magic Rectangle, a collection of his early Evening Standard TV reviews, and TV Reviews, a collection of his Evening Standard TV reviews since 2000 (published in 2011).

== Legal ==
In June 2006 the television chef Gordon Ramsay, his production company and his producer accepted an out-of-court settlement of £75,000 from Associated Newspapers, after an article in London's Evening Standard written by Lewis-Smith alleged Ramsay had faked television scenes and installed an incompetent chef. Ramsay said at the time, "We have never done anything in a cynical, fake way." However, a year later, Channel 4 admitted that a scene in another of Ramsay's programmes had been faked, and apologised to viewers.

On 28 July 2006 hypnotist Paul McKenna successfully sued the Daily Mirror for libel over articles written by Lewis-Smith from 1997 alleging McKenna had deliberately misled the public with a fake PhD, having obtained the qualification from the non-accredited LaSalle University in the United States, whose principal had since been imprisoned for making misleading claims about the status of degrees he handed out to candidates. He later accepted damages of £25,000.

== Death ==
On 12 December 2022 it was announced by Lewis-Smith's public-relations agency that the author had died after a short illness, at the age of 65, in Bruges, Belgium, on 10 December 2022.
