= Carlos Tromben =

Chilean journalist

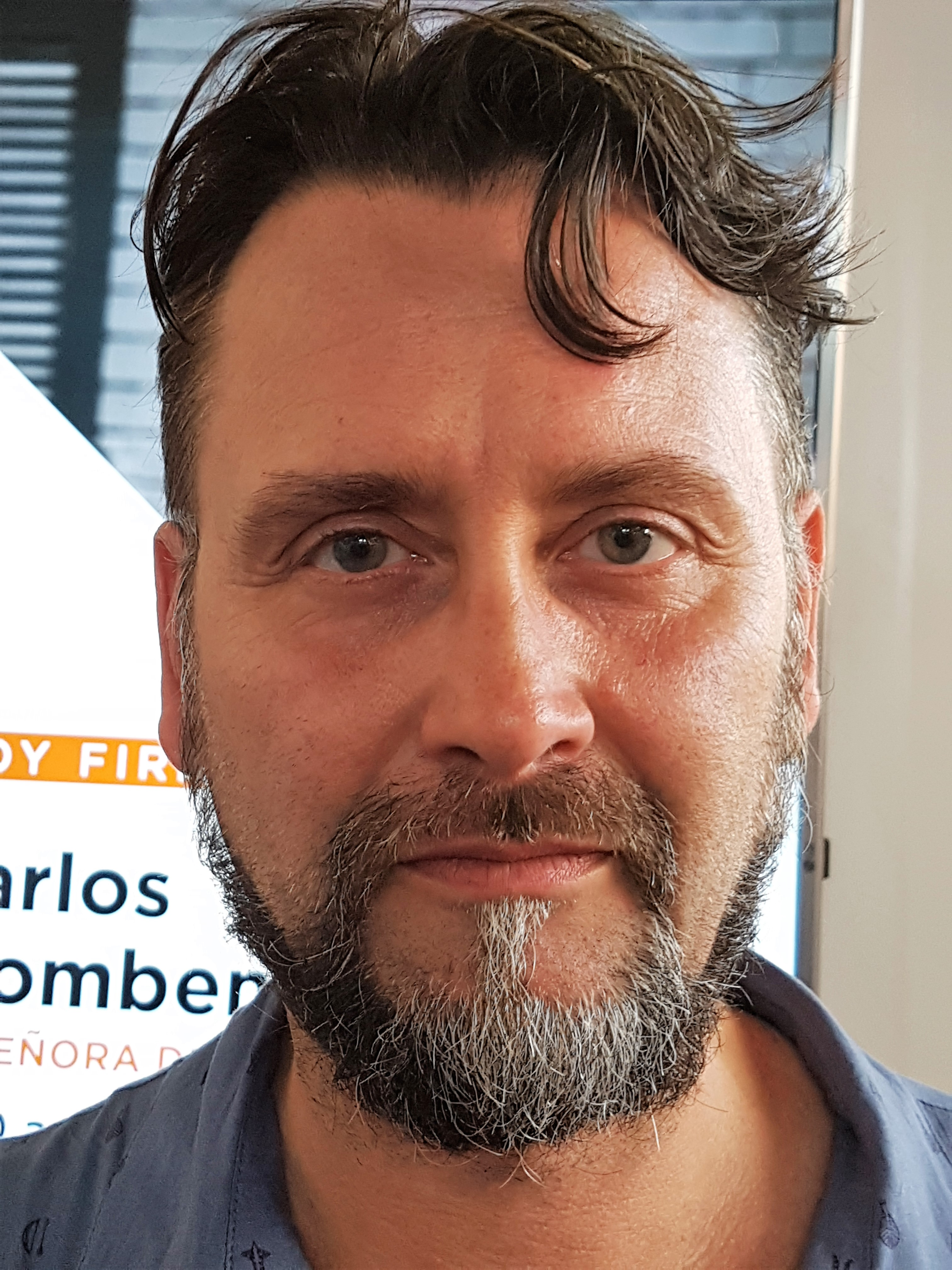

Personal details
- Born: 23 July 1966 (age 60) Valparaíso, Chile
- Education: Pontifical Catholic University of Valparaíso (BA)
- Occupation: Writer
- Profession: Economist

Carlos Andrés Tromben Reyes (born 23 July 1966) is a Chilean journalist and writer.

In 2021, he refused to run for a seat in the Constitutional Convention. However, he has defended the key proposals of the Convention.

== Biography ==
Son of the ship captain and naval historian, Carlos Tromben Corbalán, and Gloria Reyes Ojeda, Tromben studied at the French College of Vina del Mar, currently, the French Alliance, which in those years was close to the Quinta Vergara. Then he finished his BA and received as a business administrator at the Pontifical Catholic University of Valparaíso (PUCV). Similarly, he studied journalism and communication at the Higher School of Commerce in Paris (2001–2002).

Tromben made his debut in literature in 2003, when he won the El Mercurio Book Magazine contest with his first novel, Poderes Fácticos, a police novel based on a real event: the double homicide of a painter and his partner that occurred in April 1973 in an apartment on Rosal Street. It was followed, two years later, by another crime novel, Prácticas Rituales (Ritual Practices), and in 2006, Karma, a complex novel that was well received by critics and about which Camilo Marks said that he didn't consider it as his favorite 'fiction novel, but also one of the most entertaining, ambitious, visionary works published in Chile in recent times'.

After La Casa de Electra (2010) —a spy thriller set during World War II with a woman as the protagonist—, in 2015, Tromben published Huáscar, a historical novel that describes the capture of the legendary Peruvian monitor. This work, also commented by the National History Prize Eduardo Cavieres, became the second best-selling book at the 2016 Lima International Book Fair. His second historical novel, Balmaceda, appeared in 2016. The same year he released the novel Crónicas secretas de la economía chilena (Secret chronicle of the Chilean economy), which analyzes the privatization of state companies from 1974 to 1994, as well as the origin of Sebastián Piñera's fortune.

His success as a fiction writer was consolidated in 2017 with his third historical novel, Santa María de Iquique, about the massacre at the school of the same name of entire families —Bolivian, Chilean and Peruvian—, murdered by soldiers of the Chilean Army in December 1907. The work has been on the list of best sellers and was selected as one of the best books of the year by a group of ten critics and cultural journalists. The same year, he also published La Señora de Dolor, a remake of Karma, which, in Tromben's words, 'is not a 2.0 version of that book, but another novel', because 'they are the same characters, but located in a parallel universe, similar, but not identical'.

== Works ==
=== Fiction ===
- Poderes fácticos, policial novel, Mercurio Aguilar, 2003
- Prácticas rituales, policial novel, Alfaguara, 2005
- Karma, novel, Seix Barral, 2006
- Perdidos en el espacio I, stories, Calabaza del Diablo, 2008
- La Casa de Electra, thriller, Alfaguara, 2010
- Perdidos en el espacio II, stories, Calabaza del Diablo, 2011
- Huáscar, Historical novel, Ediciones B, 2015 (Estruendomudo, Lima, 2016)
- Balmaceda, Historical novel, Ediciones B, 2016
- La señora de dolor; Ediciones B, 2017
- Santa María de Iquique, la muerte de la República, Historical novel, Ediciones B, 2017
- El vino de Dios, Thriller, Ediciones B, 2019

=== No-fiction ===
- Crónica secreta de la economía chilena, Essay, Ediciones B, 2016
- Pescado Rabioso, Essay, Ediciones B, 2018
- Brevario del Neoliberalismo, Essay, Mandrágora, 2019
