= Mike Wilson (writer, born 1974) =

American-Argentine writer (born 1974)

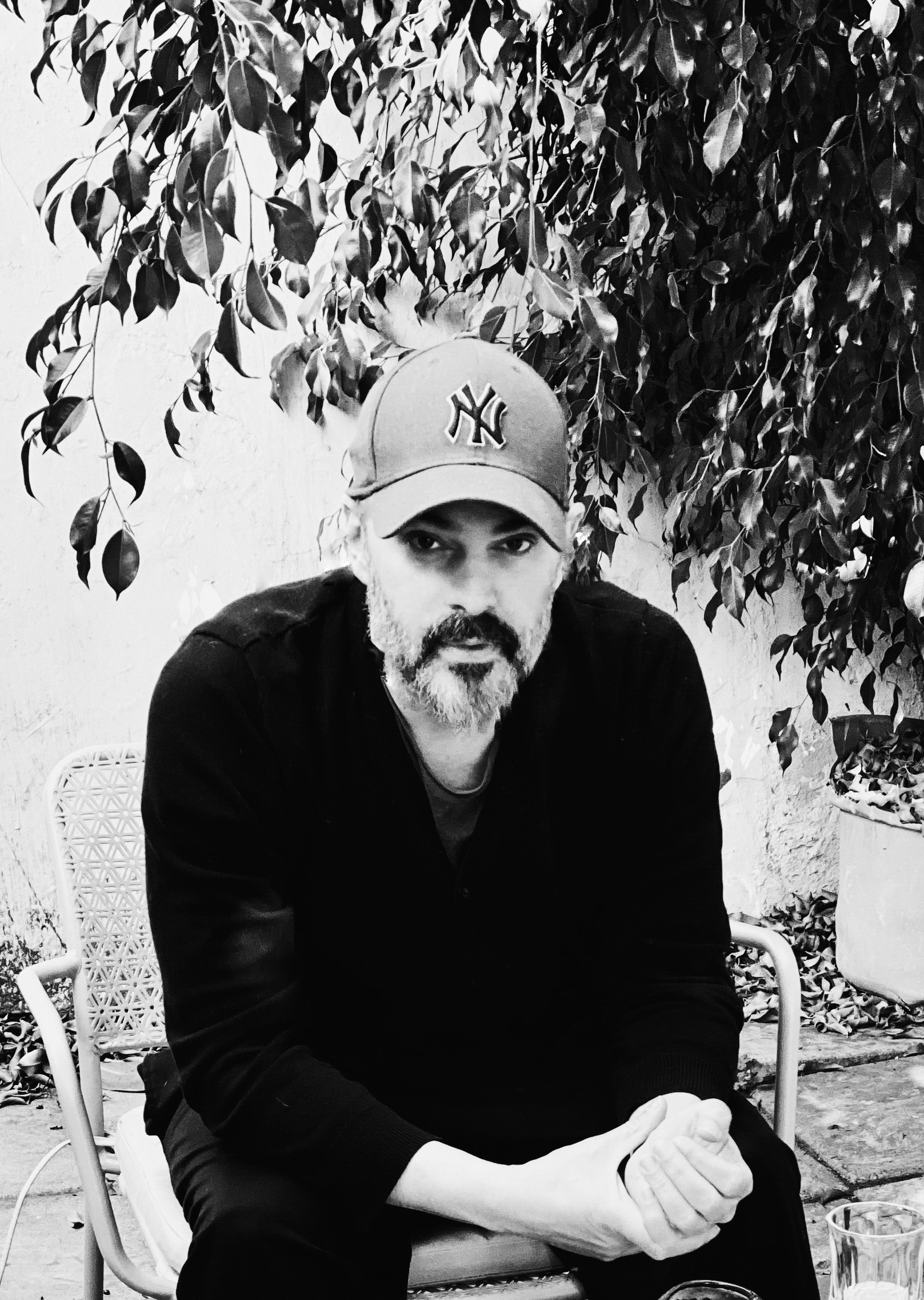
- Wilson in 2020
- Born: Michael James Wilson; 1974 (age 51–52); St. Louis, Missouri, U.S.
- Citizenship: United States; Argentina; Chile
- Education: Cornell University
- Occupations: Writer; academic
- Years active: 2003–present
- Employer: Pontifical Catholic University of Chile

Michael James Wilson (born 1974) is an American and Argentine writer based in Chile. He achieved critical acclaim and received the Critics' and National Council of Culture and the Arts awards in 2014 for his fifth novel, Leñador (2013).

== Biography ==
Although Mike Wilson was born in the St. Louis, Missouri, most of his childhood and adolescence were spent in South America. When he was three years old, he arrived in Chile with his American father and Argentine mother; at seven they moved to Asunción, Paraguay, and finally settled in Buenos Aires, where Wilson would attend some primary school and receive all of his secondary education.

The family returned to the United States after his father became a diplomat during the presidency of Jimmy Carter, and Wilson entered Cornell University in New York, where he studied Hispanic Literature and met Edmundo Paz Soldán.

He returned to Chile in 2005 after receiving his doctorate, and obtained a position as professor of English Literature at the Catholic University. Since then he has resided in that country.

== Career ==
He published the novel Nachtrópolis in 2003. Wilson defined it as "an alternate history set in the 40s in a version of Buenos Aires overflown by German Zeppelins and under a Perón government controlled by the Reich."

Five years later El púgil was released, a text in which "the references range from the work and life of Roberto Arlt to the aesthetics of Blade Runner, and from the classic trans-Andean comic book The Eternaut to the voice of Orson Welles reading The War of the Worlds." His 2009 post-apocalyptic novel Zombie tells the story of some teenagers who have survived the destruction of La Avellana, a neighborhood that could well be Santiago's La Dehesa, with a "devastating panorama of once perfect houses with perfect courtyards for perfect families." The boys who survive, "abandoned to their fate, end up behaving like zombies addicted to methamphetamine."

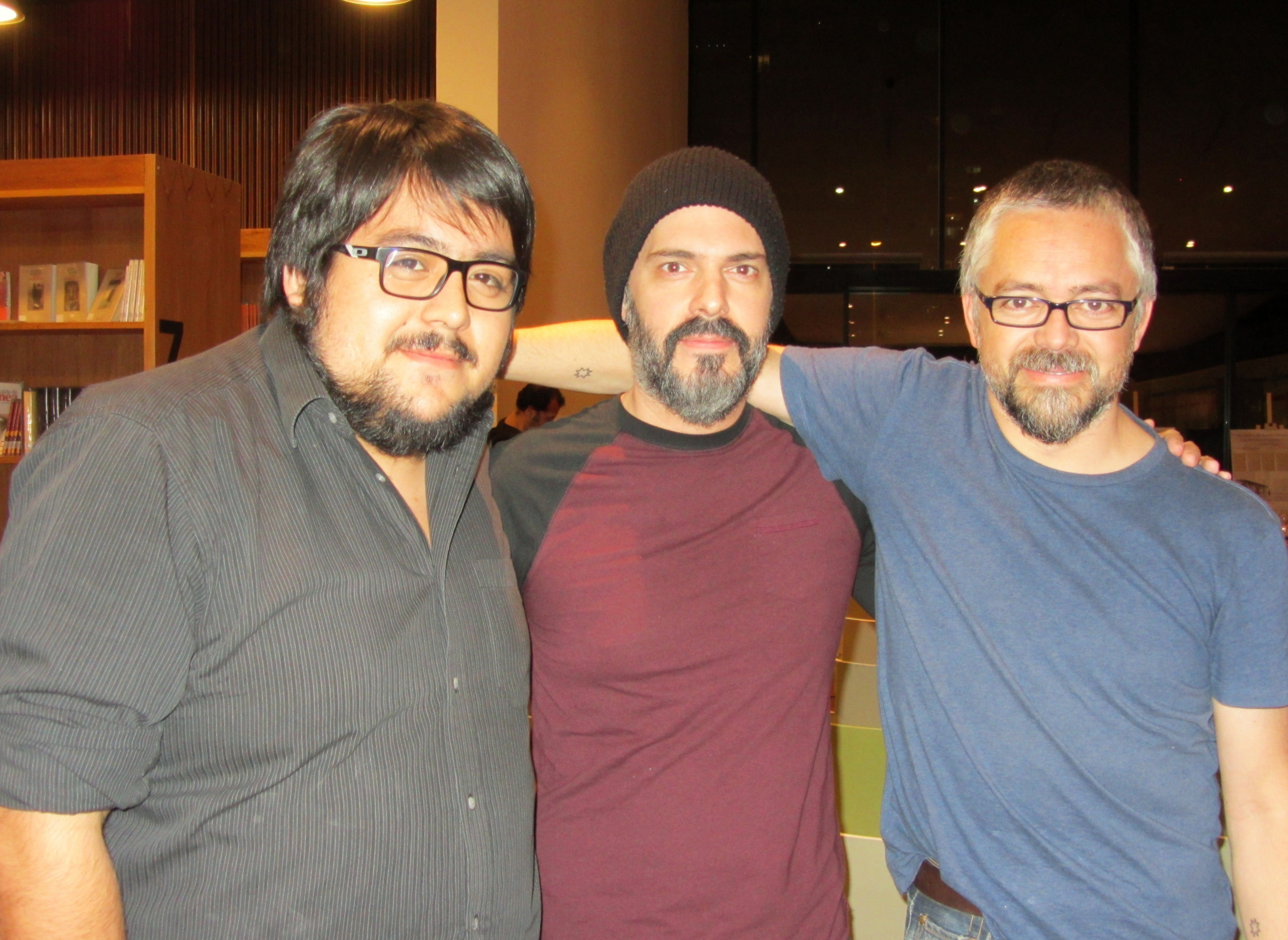
Wilson with the writers Diego Zúñiga and Jorge Baradit at the GAM, April 2015

On the eve of publishing his second novel, Wilson was signed by Guillermo Schavelzon's agency, which meant moving from the small publisher Forja to Alfaguara, who released his third novel, Rockabilly (2011). Journalist Alberto Rojas described it as "a terrifying trip to those places away from the big American cities that Wilson knows well, where men and women live in search of their broken dreams, in the midst of nights that seem never to end."

In Letras Libres, Mauricio Montiel wrote that "the best of contemporary Latin American narrative is brewing away from the center and near the periphery," and that a good example of this thesis are these two novels by "Wilson, rara avis that has decided to return to the bustle of the downtown – read literary – establishment to face the apparent suburban stillness with a look full of concern, and I say and emphasize 'apparent', because in the powerful suburban diptych composed of Zombie and Rockabilly [...] that peace goes on to reveal a substratum of contained violence that ends up emerging in unsuspected and openly disturbing ways."

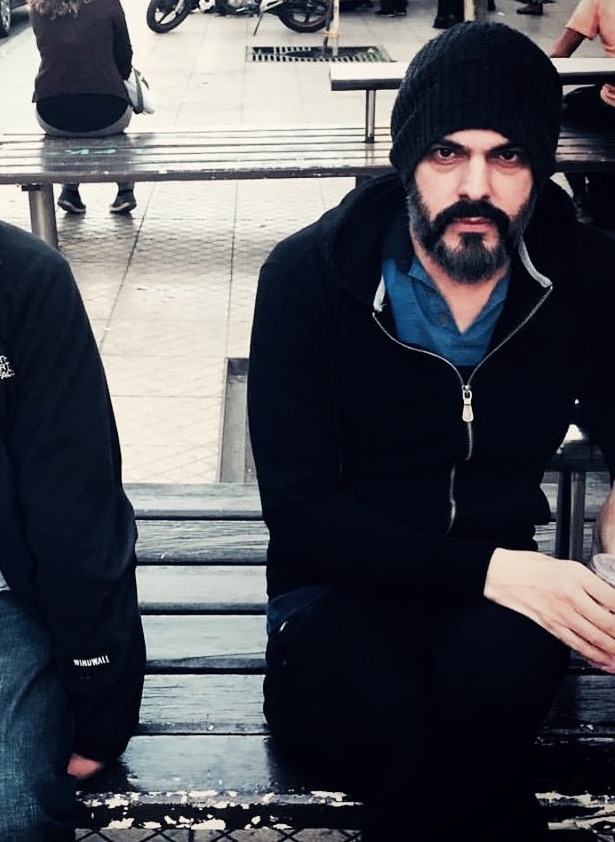
At FILSA 2015

His fifth novel, Leñador (2013), marked a turn in several ways. "I was interested in the possibility of writing without narrating, without the necessary action that everyone expects," explained Wilson, who said that this would be the last work of fiction he would publish. The author "resigned to a position of privilege in the national literary medium," and ended his link with agent Guillermo Schavelzon and Alfaguara to publish his novel with a small Chilean label, Orjikh. In addition, he shut down his blog and his Facebook account; his name does not appear on the cover of the book. As the critic and writer Patricio Jara said, "a peaceful and silent retreat, just like the retirement of the woodcutter" who stars in the novel.

José Promis, meanwhile, explained that, "to carry out his desacralizador y rupturista project, Mike Wilson has drawn on elements characteristic of popular culture, peripheral culture during the golden age of the great continental narratives."

After publishing Leñador, Wilson declared that he had abandoned fiction, and his next book, Wittgenstein y el sentido tácito de las cosas (2014) seemed to confirm this decision; however, he later returned to narrative. In 2016 he wrote Scout, "a story quite traditional in its narrative," which he published in fanzine format. Early the following year he released Ártico: una lista with Fiordo, a small Buenos Aires publishing house that had reissued Leñador. The text – which in his words "is an inventory of impressions, a nouvelle in verse, a long poem, a list" – was written in 2015 in Ushuaia, on a trip to Argentine Patagonia.

"At the time I wrote, Leñador, I did not want anything to do with narrative. I needed to get away and I did not want to continue publishing fiction; it was what I honestly felt at that moment and I still think a little," said Wilson about his return to fiction, recognizing that he "cheated" after that novel when writing Scout. He explains this act as, "a way of not being on the official circuit, the same as publishing in Argentina. That distance calms me down, now I publish again, but Ártico is not a conventional narrative. I enjoy writing – it makes me well, it is necessary – but the process that comes after, not so much; working with publishers and promotion in the media are not situations in which I feel very comfortable."

== Works ==
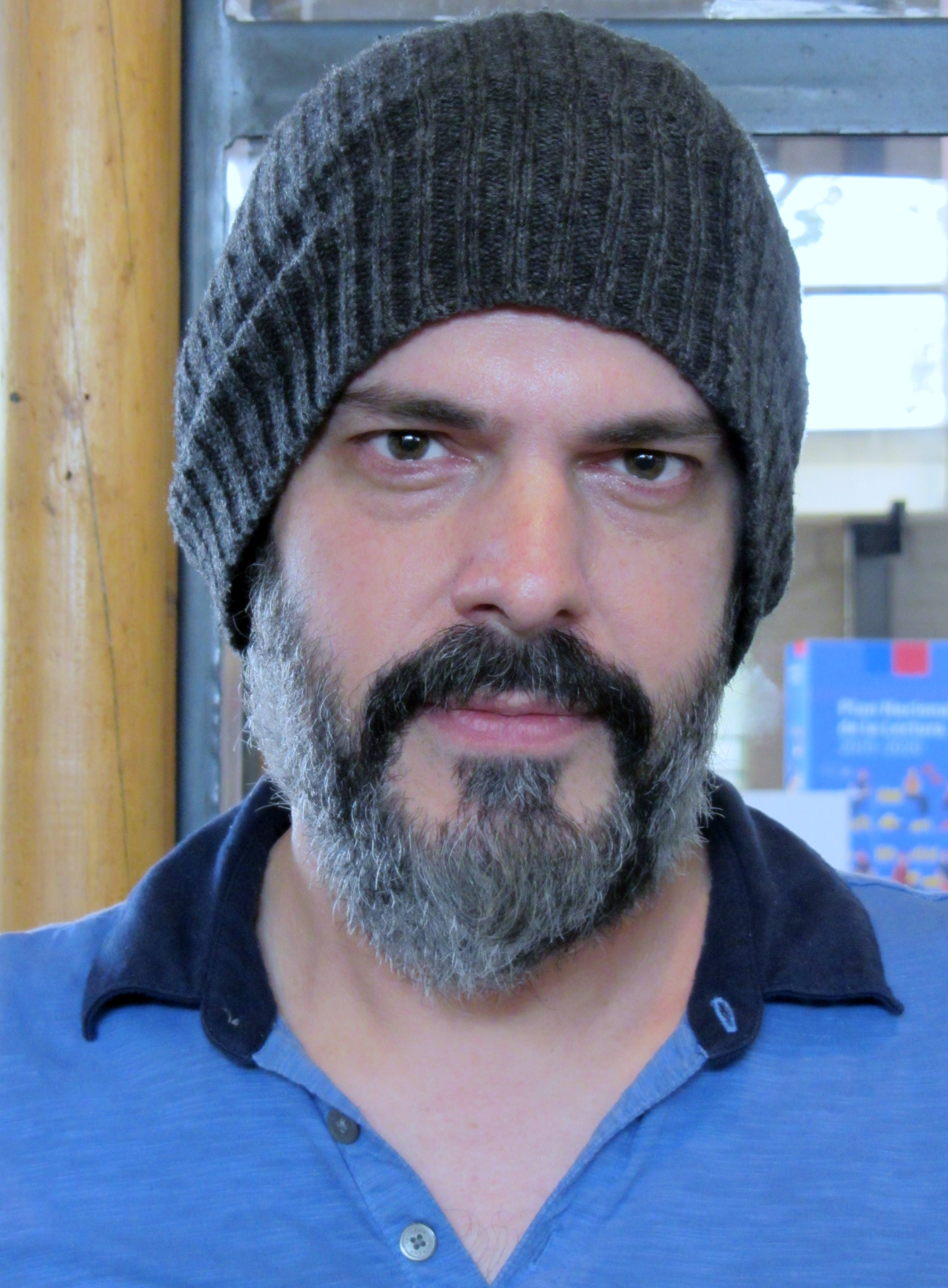
At FILSA 2015

- Nachtrópolis, novel, Editorial Ambrosía, Buenos Aires, 2003
- El púgil, novel, Editorial Forja, Santiago, 2008
- Zombie, novel, Alfaguara, Santiago, 2009
- Rockabilly, novel, Alfaguara, Santiago, 2011
- Where Is My Mind? Cognición, literatura y cine, essay, Cuarto Propio, Santiago, 2012
- Leñador, novel, Orjikh, Santiago, 2013
- Wittgenstein y el sentido tácito de las cosas, essay, Orjikh, Santiago, 2014
- Scout, fanzine, 2016
- Ártico: una lista, Fiordo, Buenos Aires, 2017
- Ciencias ocultas, novel, Fiordo, Buenos Aires, 2019
- Némesis, novel, Mw, Chile, 2020
- Un niño llamado Gárgola, children's novel, Planeta, Buenos Aires, 2022
- Dios duerme en la piedra, novel, Fiordo, Buenos Aires, 2023

== Awards ==
- 2013: Catholic University Artistic Creation Award
- 2014: Critics' Award, for Leñador
- 2014: National Council of Culture and the Arts Award, for Leñador
