= In Confidence =

- Starring: Laurie Taylor
- Country of origin: United Kingdom
- No. of series: 3
- No. of episodes: 20+

Production
- Executive producer: Victor Lewis-Smith
- Running time: 60mins (inc. adverts)
- Production company: Associated-Rediffusion

Original release
- Network: Sky Arts HD
- Release: 2010

In Confidence is a British television series presented by Laurie Taylor and executive produced by Victor Lewis-Smith, in which a one-on-one in depth interview with a public figure takes place over the course of about an hour. The object of the interview is to try to determine who the subject really is and how they think. The show airs on Sky Arts in the UK.

== Series 1 ==
This series included ten episodes, in which Professor Taylor interviews Damien Hirst, Richard Dawkins, Jonathan Miller, Ann Widdecombe, Tom Baker, Will Self, David Starkey, Kathy Burke, Martin Rowson and Lily Allen.

== Series 2 ==
The subjects of this series include Sheila Hancock, Mike Leigh, Shirley Williams, André Previn, Peter Hitchens, Christopher Hitchens, Tracey Emin, Cleo Laine, Peter Maxwell Davies, Danny Baker, Stephen Fry and Jackie Mason.

== Series 3 ==
A third series of ten episodes began transmission on Sky Arts in March 2012.

The interviews included Keith Allen, Nigel Kennedy, Ann Leslie, Uri Geller, and Michael Winner.

== Series 4 ==
A fourth series of ten episodes ran in 2013.

== Series 5 ==
A fifth series of 19 episodes ran in 2014.
