= Laurie Taylor (sociologist) =

British sociologist and radio presenter (born 1935)

- Born: Laurence John Taylor; 1935 (age 90–91); Liverpool, England
- Education: Birkbeck, University of London; University of Leicester; Rose Bruford College
- Occupations: Sociologist; Radio presenter
- Spouses: Jennie Howells (?–?); Anna Coote (?–?); Cathie Mahoney (1988–?); Sally Feldman (?–)
- Children: Matthew Taylor
- Website: Laurie Taylor publications on Academia.edu

Laurence John Taylor (born 1935) is an English sociologist and radio presenter, originally from Liverpool.

== Biography ==
After attending Roman Catholic schools including St Mary's College, Crosby, Merseyside, then a direct grant grammar and now an independent school, Taylor trained as an actor at Rose Bruford College, Sidcup, associated with Joan Littlewood's Theatre Workshop in Stratford, London. He was also a teacher at the Forest Hill comprehensive school for boys.

After earning degrees in sociology and psychology, as a mature student, at Birkbeck College and the University of Leicester, Taylor joined the department of sociology at the University of York, eventually becoming a professor at that institution. He is retired from York.

Taylor is sometimes thought to be the model for Howard Kirk in Malcolm Bradbury's novel The History Man although Bradbury and Taylor had not met at the time the book was written. Taylor was then a member of the Trotskyist political party International Socialists.

Taylor is divorced from his third wife (whom he married in December 1988 in Camden), radio producer Cathie Mahoney who works on Loose Ends on BBC Radio 4. He was previously married to journalist Anna Coote, a former deputy editor of the New Statesman, who has also been associated with various public organisations. He is now married to Sally Feldman, journalist and former editor of Radio Four's Woman's Hour and currently a humanist celebrant. He is a Vice President of Humanists UK.

Taylor's son, Matthew, is Chief Executive of the NHS Confederation.

== Career ==
Taylor has a particular interest in criminology. He was one of the founder members of the National Deviancy Conference. A popular author writing on the media and fame, he has published widely in criminology. Perhaps his best-known early work was the book co-written with Stanley Cohen: Escape Attempts: The Theory and Practice of Resistance to Everyday Life. The book arose from research into the wellbeing of long-term prisoners. He has collaborated with bank robber turned author, John McVicar, on research.

Taylor has had an extensive broadcasting career on BBC Radio 4. For many years he was a participant on Robert Robinson's programme Stop The Week, later presented The Radio Programme and took on The Afternoon Shift, a re-branding of the ill-fated Anderson Country. His media associates have included Tom Baker and Victor Lewis-Smith. In 1991 he appeared in the documentary Flesh and Blood: The Story of the Krays.

Since 1998, Taylor has regularly presented the discussion programme Thinking Allowed on BBC Radio 4, a series mainly devoted to the social sciences. In addition, he is known for his long-running and mainly humorous column in the Times Higher Education Supplement as well as writing for the New Humanist and being a distinguished supporter of Humanists UK. He is the presenter of In Confidence, a series of one-hour in-depth interviews with public figures.

== Honours ==
- Honorary doctorate, Birmingham City University
- Honorary doctorate, University of Nottingham, 1992
- Honorary doctorate, University of Leicester, 2007
- Honorary doctorate, Queen's University Belfast, 2008
- Honorary doctorate, University of Aberdeen, 2009
- Honorary doctorate, Goldsmiths College, 2013
- Honorary doctorate, Abertay University, 2016

== Publications ==
=== Books ===
- Taylor, L. 1967. Signs of Trouble: Aspects of Delinquency. BBC.
- Taylor, Laurie (1971), Deviance and Society, London: Michael Joseph
- Taylor, Laurie; Cohen, Stanley (1972), Psychological Survival: the Experience of Long Term Imprisonment, Harmondsworth: Penguin
- Taylor, Laurie; Taylor, Ian (1972), Politics And Deviance (ed.), Harmondsworth: Penguin
- Taylor, Laurie; Robertson, Roland (1973), Deviance, Crime and Socio-Legal control, London: Martin Robertson
- Cohen, S. & Taylor, Laurie (1976), Escape attempts: the theory and practice of resistance in everyday life ISBN 978-0-415-06500-9. New edition Routledge, 1992.
- Taylor, L, R Lacey and D Bracken. 1980. In Whose Best Interests?: Unjust Treatment of Children in Courts and Institutions. Civil Liberties Trust.
- Taylor, Laurie (1984), In the Underworld, Oxford: Blackwell
- Taylor, L and B. Mullan. 1986. Uninvited Guests: Intimate Secrets of Television and Radio. Chatto & Windus.
- Taylor, Laurie; Taylor, Matthew (2001), What Are Children For?, London: Trafalgar Square, ISBN 978-1-904095-25-5
- Taylor, L. 2004. The Laurie Taylor Guide to Higher Education. Butterworth-Heinemann.
- Taylor, L. 2014. In Confidence: Talking Frankly about Fame. Zero Books.

=== Papers and contributions ===
- Taylor, Laurie; Walton, P. (1971), "Industrial Sabotage: Motives and Meanings", in Cohen, Stanley (ed.), Images of Deviance, Harmondsworth: Penguin
- Taylor, Laurie (1972), "The Significance and Interpretations of Replies to Motivational Questions: the Case of Sex Offenders", Sociology, 6 (1): 23–40, doi:10.1177/003803857200600102, S2CID 145126928.
