= Thinking Allowed =

BBC radio programme

- Genre: Discussion
- Running time: 28 mins
- Country of origin: United Kingdom
- Language: English
- Home station: BBC Radio 4
- Hosted by: Laurie Taylor
- Produced by: Jayne Egerton
- Original release: 1998
- Website: Website
- Podcast: Podcast RSS feed

Thinking Allowed is a radio discussion programme broadcast on BBC Radio 4 on Wednesdays between 16:00 and 16:30 and repeated between 00:15 and 00:45 on Mondays. It focuses on the latest social science research and is hosted by Laurie Taylor, who was formerly a Professor of Sociology at the University of York. The programme was first broadcast in 1998. Occasionally, special editions of the programme are produced in co-operation with The Open University.

It was announced in October 2026 that the programme would be discontinued, as part of a wider package of budget cuts affecting a number of Radio 4 programmes.
