= Camilo Marks =

Chilean writer and human rights defender

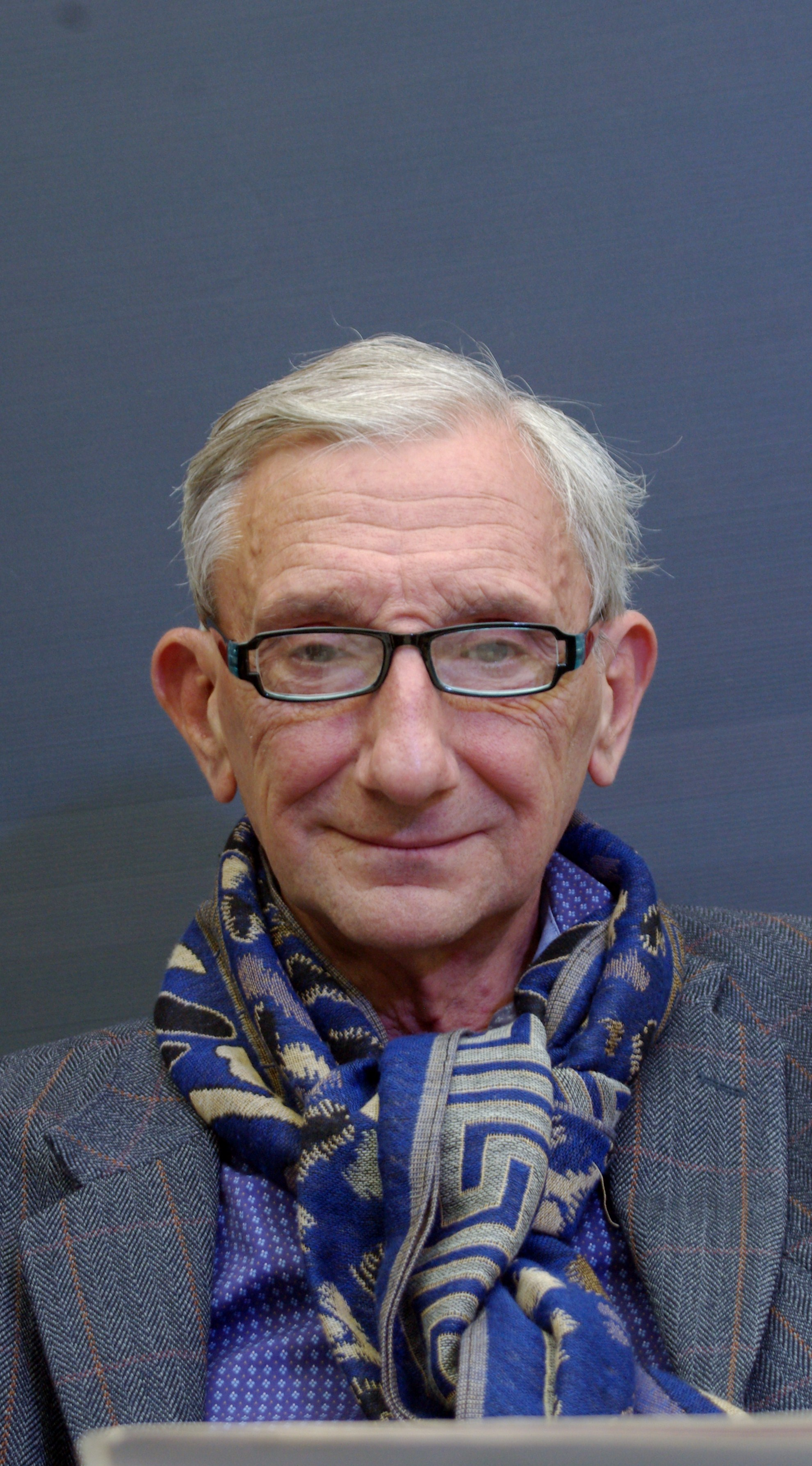
- Marks at FILSA 2015
- Born: Camilo Marks Alonso; 1948 (age 77–78); Santiago, Chile
- Education: University of Chile
- Occupations: Writer, professor, human rights lawyer
- Parents: Camilo Marks (father); Loreto Alonso (mother)
- Awards: National Council of Culture and the Arts Award

Camilo Marks (born 1948) is a Chilean human rights lawyer, academic, writer, and literary critic.

== Biography ==
Camilo Marks is the son of Loreto Alonso, the sixth daughter of a Spanish communist deputy who "escaped the dictatorship of Primo de Rivera and arrived in Chile in 1940 with his family after living in France." The writer's grandfather Camilo had the French surname Marqes. This lost its original spelling when his father (also Camilo) was named, and was changed to match its pronunciation: Marks. The couple had a second child, Rodrigo. Camilo's father separated from Loreto (although they never divorced), resided in Valdivia, and had two children with his new partner, whom they named Camilo and Camila.

He finished his secondary education at the Internado Nacional Barros Arana, after having studied at the Instituto Nacional. He pursued a law degree at the University of Chile and took his exam before the military coup led by General Augusto Pinochet against the government of Salvador Allende, but he did not graduate until 1975, after changing the subject of his thesis. It had initially been about aircraft hijacking (part of it came out in the first quarter 1974 Public Law Review under the title "El delito de apoderamiento ilícito de aeronaves" (The crime of unlawful seizure of aircraft). At the end of 1975, after working with the Comité Pro Paz and the MIR, he left Chile for England, where he studied literature in London.

After returning in the early 1980s, he was reinstated as a lawyer to defend victims of human rights violations by the military dictatorship, first with the Vicariate of Solidarity, and after its dissolution, in the agencies that continued with this work: the Reparation and Reconciliation Corporation, the Human Rights Program of the Ministry of the Interior, and the Valech Commission.

== Literary career ==
Marks says that he learned to read at an early age, and decided that someday he would become a writer, which in fact happened many years later. "Of course, I delayed a lot, maybe too much, in becoming a public one. I am definitely a late writer, and that is due to everything I have in the book and other things I do not tell," Marks said in an interview after the publication of his memoirs in 2015.

First, he began to write literary criticism at the Literlex Law School. Then, on his return from exile, he wrote for Apsi magazine, La Época, Qué Pasa, La Tercera, and finally El Mercurio. But it was his presence on TVN's cultural program Hora 25 which made him well known.

His first novel, La dictadura del proletariado, appeared in 2001 and was a finalist for the Rómulo Gallegos Prize. Two years later, he compiled the Chilean short story anthology Grandes cuentos chilenos del siglo XX, and in 2004 published his second novel, Altiva música en la tormenta, which was also a finalist for the aforementioned award. Next came La sinfonía fantástica (2008).

Marks has published books of literary criticism, and has been a translator and consultant to several publishers. He has also been a jury member for competitions of the National Book Fund, the El Mercurio Book Review, and the José Donoso Prize.

Marks has done important work as an anthologist: in 2002 he published Grandes cuentos chilenos del siglo XX (reissued in 2004 and expanded in 2007), and ten years later he produced Los mejores cuentos chilenos del siglo XXI.

He is a professor at Diego Portales University, and has also taught at the universities of Santiago, ARCIS, and Santo Tomás.

== Works ==
- La dictadura del proletariado, novel, Alfaguara Chile, 2001
- Altiva música en la tormenta, novel, Mondadori, 2004
- La crítica: el género de los géneros, compilation of literary essays, Ediciones UDP, 2007
- La sinfonía fantástica, novel, Mondadori, 2008
- Canon. Cenizas y diamantes de la literatura chilena, essay, Debate, 2010
- Biografía del crimen, essay about the crime novel, Ediciones UDP, 2014
- Preparativos para un viaje a Kiev, novellas, Mondadori, 2014. Containing three texts:
  - El verano sin verano
  - Preparativos para un viaje a Kiev
  - Variaciones Goldberg
- El gusto de criticar, compilation of stories from El Mercurio; University of Talca, 2015
- Indemne todos estos años, memoirs, Lumen, 2015

== Awards and recognition ==
- Rómulo Gallegos Prize finalist for La dictadura del proletariado
- Rómulo Gallegos Prize finalist for Altiva música en la tormenta
- 2016 National Council of Culture and the Arts Award in the category of Memoir Writers, Published Work for Indemne todos estos años
