= The Afternoon Shift =

British radio magazine programme

- Running time: 1 hour (3:00 pm – 4:00 pm)
- Country of origin: United Kingdom
- Language: English
- Home station: BBC Radio 4
- Hosted by: Laurie Taylor; Daire Brehan
- Original release: February 1995 – April 1998

The Afternoon Shift was a magazine programme on BBC Radio 4. Launched in February 1995, the programme replaced the ill-fated Anderson Country, which had proved to be divisive amongst Radio 4 listeners over the different tone of the programme when compared with the rest of Radio 4.

== Overview ==
The programme was broadcast on weekdays between 3pm and 4pm and ran for three years, ending as part of the major revamp of the Radio 4 schedule of April 1998.

The programme was presented on Mondays and Fridays by Laurie Taylor and on Tuesdays, Wednesdays and Thursdays by Daire Brehan.
