= The Infernal Desire Machines of Doctor Hoffman =

1972 novel by Angela Carter

- First edition
- Author: Angela Carter
- Language: English
- Genre: Picaresque
- Publisher: Rupert Hart-Davis
- Publication date: 1972
- Publication place: Great Britain
- Pages: 286
- ISBN: 0-246-10545-3
- OCLC: 31035570

The Infernal Desire Machines of Doctor Hoffman, published in the United States as The War of Dreams, is a 1972 novel by Angela Carter. This picaresque novel is heavily influenced by surrealism, Romanticism, critical theory, and other branches of Continental philosophy. Its style is an amalgam of magical realism and postmodern pastiche. The novel has been called a theoretical fiction, as it clearly engages in some of the theoretical issues of its time, notably feminism, mass media and the counterculture.

The novel features Desiderio, an assistant to a government minister in a city which is currently under attack by Doctor Hoffman's reality-distorting machines, in an unspecified Latin American country. Desiderio embarks on a journey to find Hoffman's former physics teacher, eventually bringing him to Hoffman's castle.

== Plot summary ==
The novel presents the story from the perspective of Desiderio, a bureau member in the main city currently under the attack of Doctor Hoffman's desire machines. With these machines, Doctor Hoffman expands the dimensions of time and space, allowing ever-changing mirages to inhabit the same dimension as the living. Desiderio, though indifferent to the haunting apparitions, finds himself visited nightly by a glass woman, the manifestation of Albertina, Hoffman's daughter and Desiderio's lover-to-be. Unlike Desiderio, many people go crazy in response to the apparitions, and the city, severed from communication with the outside world, becomes a place of rampant insanity and crime, thereby prompting a state of emergency. Under the command of the Minister of Determination, Desiderio embarks on an undercover journey to find and assassinate Doctor Hoffman and to investigate the disappearance of the town of S.

In S Desiderio encounters Doctor Hoffman's former physics professor, now a blind peep-show proprietor. During the story, Desiderio views the sexualised exhibits of the peep show a number of times, finding that they bear uncanny resemblance to the events of his own life. Upon reaching the Mayor's Office of town S., he is allocated lodgings in the Mayor's home where he rapes the Mayor's somnambulist daughter, Mary Anne, while she remains unconscious. When Mary Anne turns up dead, members of the Determination Police charge Desiderio, but he escapes. From there on, Desiderio finds himself involved in a number of wild adventures in which the novel features many graphic scenes of eroticism that include sexual taboos. On these adventures, Albertina secretly accompanies Desiderio.

Desiderio spends time living with the river people, Amerindian families who live on barges. He then joins a traveling carnival in which he becomes enthralled with the extraordinary performance of a troupe of acrobats. Following the destruction of the circus in a landslide, he encounters a Lithuanian count who is fleeing from the wrath of a black pimp, and who takes Desiderio into his company. With the count, Desiderio narrowly escapes becoming the victim of cannibalism on the African coast before Albertina reveals herself and leads Desiderio through the landscape of Nebulous Time where a community of centaurs adopts the two. However, the couple's lives become endangered yet again; at which point Hoffman's soldiers appear in a helicopter and take the pair to Hoffman's castle, where Doctor Hoffman explains his plans to reduce the world into its most basic constituents with the help of Desiderio and Albertina. While Desiderio loves Albertina, he ultimately chooses reality over the fulfilment of desire when he kills both Doctor Hoffman and his daughter. As a result, Desiderio becomes the proclaimed hero of the Great War. Nevertheless, he continues to long for his dead lover.

== Structure ==
The Infernal Desire Machines of Doctor Hoffman is a first person frame narrative. Desiderio recounts the events of his past with several instances of second person. "...it was I who killed her. But you must not expect a love story or a murder story. expect a tale of picaresque adventure or even of heroic adventure..." (14). Carter ornamentally depicts many of Desiderio's events and defamiliarises the reader throughout the novel. In the introduction of the novel, Desiderio essentially gives away the ending and the climax. This formal choice repeats throughout the novel as Carter constantly references the outcome of actions and events that have not occurred in the text.

== Characters ==
Doctor Hoffman – an evil, sadistic scientist akin to Doctor Faustus. The doctor is the antagonist and diabolical adversary of the novel. He masters physics and surpasses his teacher, the proprietor; he later uses this ability to create a new form of reality in which nothing is bound by time or the normal rules of physics. With help from his colleague Mendoza, he discovers that "eroto-energy" can power his desire machines with omnipotent and everlasting energy. He uses his desire machines to fuel energy into his new reality. Desiderio describes Doctor Hoffman's laboratory in cinematic terms as a cross between the laboratory of the antagonist Rotwang in Metropolis and the Cabinet of Dr. Caligari.

Desiderio – The narrator and protagonist of the novel. He is now an old man and recounts the events of his life to explain how he became a hero. In his youth Desiderio was a government minister in an unspecified Latin country that works under the Minister, who sent him on a journey to find and inconspicuously assassinate Dr. Hoffman and destroy his machines. At the beginning of his journey he is sardonic and the complex images produced by the desire machines bore him; he can not surrender to the mirages. It is this attitude that keeps him alive. Desiderio, in Italian, literally means wish, longing, and desire. Dr Hoffman's daughter, Albertina, haunts Desiderio's dreams and constantly seduces him. Yet despite his love for Albertina, he eventually murders her.

Albertina – Dr. Hoffman's daughter, who supports her father's actions and ideals. She is Desiderio's soul mate and is extremely sexually appealing. She wants to use the energy from her and Desiderio's mutual sexual attraction to energize the omnipotent desire machines, thus increasing her father's power. The name is most likely a reference to Proust's "Albertine", a female character that serves as an "other," or mirror for the protagonist.

The Minister – Works with Desiderio and essentially rules the city until Dr. Hoffman starts his campaign against human reason. The minister loves logic and admires statis. Despite his envy of Dr. Hoffman's power, the minister wants to stop the freak show that the Doctor has created. To restore society, he creates reality testing labs to discover Doctor Hoffman's secret methods.

The Count – An egotistic and vulgar traveller who takes Desiderio into his company. Consistent with his arrogance, he claims that "he only lived to negate the world," and he travels according to his erotic desires. Though generally undaunted, the Count is fearful of a black pimp who wishes to kill him. Albertina later tells Desiderio that her father considered the Count a threat to her father's plans.

== Themes ==
=== Feminism ===
Carter explores feminism throughout the novel. Despite the fact that all of her female characters are victimised, they do not lose their sexual desire. "Rather than desexualize and subsequently dehumanize her female characters, Carter creates women who are sexual even when their desires are seemingly undesirable from feminist perspectives." This "undesirable desire" portrays her female character as strong and unbreakable, supporting her feminist views.

=== Media's effect on society ===
Doctor Hoffman's illusion inducing machines create the same effect as today's newspapers, magazines, websites, and television broadcasts. Throughout the novel, Carter asks the reader to define what is real versus what is an illusion. Hoffman's machines keep "projecting representations on the world". In the modern world, "technology makes the reign of the images possible" and Carter is wary of images for they can be mere illusions.

== Literary significance and reception ==
Jeff VanderMeer has described The Infernal Desire Machines of Doctor Hoffman as "the finest surrealist novel of the past 30 years. It perfectly captures the ideas and ideals of surrealist beauty". In The New York Times, William Hjortsberg recommended Carter's novel, noting its attention to detail and maintaining that while reading "We soon forget that the terrain she observes with such care is the interior of her own imagination, for the world she describes becomes as real as any naturalist's report." However, he criticised Carter's wordiness and her overuse of abstraction, simile, and metaphors.

== Cultural references ==
The post-punk band Acrobats of Desire took their name from the carnival troupe in the novel.

== Publication history ==
1972, United States, Penguin Group ISBN 0-14-023519-1

== Bibliography ==
- Suleiman, Susan Rubin. "The Fate of the Surrealist Imagination in the Society of the Spectacle." Flesh and The Mirror. Ed. Lorna Sage. London: Virago Press, 1994. 98–116.
