= Sheila Hill (writer) =

English artist

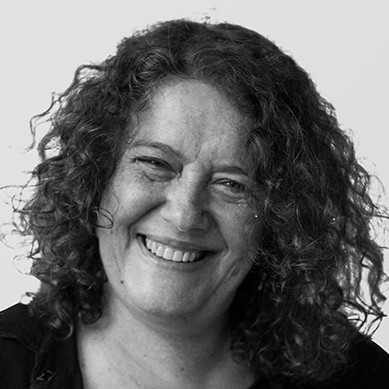
Hill in 2022

Sheila Hill is an English artist, writer and theatremaker.

== Career ==
She was a columnist and feature writer for the Guardian newspaper, before focusing on theatre, and art installations.

A spinal injury, in her early 30s, removed her from normal life, but Atkinson Morley Hospital's intensive rehabilitation programme started to turn things around, despite the fact that regaining a functional level of strength took several years.

Sheila wrote about this period in a series of newspaper articles, and also in her theatre work, Crocodile Looking At Birds - selected as one of the Observer newspaper Arts Events of the Year.

As an artist, she draws on real voices, transcribing and editing these into short, poetic testimonies, which she uses as her starting material.

Sheila also founded and curated Tabernacle Folk, a four-year, progressive, commissioning, international music festival (2010-2013). This was voted Critics Choice Best Gig in London, by Time Out.

In 2019, she was co-commissioned by Brighton Festival and Glyndebourne to create an autobiographical work about motherhood, performed by 100 women, grandmothers and children, which she spoke about in features on BBC Radio 3 (In Tune) and BBC Radio 4 (Woman's Hour).

== Works ==
- Eye to Eye, The Dome, Brighton Festival, 2019
- Him, Royal Festival Hall/Glasgow's Tramway/Birmingham Rep/Edinburgh Traverse, 2016
- The Question Room, Science Museum, London, 2009
- I See Your Beating Heart, Chelsea and Westminster Hospital, London, 2001
- Crocodile Looking At Birds, Lyric Hammersmith, London, 1995
- My Parents Never Talk To White People, ICA, London, 1994
- Check King Coal, Oval House, London, 1985
