= Acrobats of Desire =

English post-punk band

Acrobats of Desire were an English post-punk band originally from Sheffield, Yorkshire. The group were an electric string quartet fronted by a lead vocalist with an instrumental line-up which consisted of violin, viola, cello, and assorted percussion. The group was dominantly female and included some of the seminal female names of the late UK punk period, including Vicky Aspinall (violin), who went on to join The Raincoats and Mary Jenner (violin) who became a bassist for Leeds art house group The Mekons.

Virginia Duff (percussion and vocals) went on to become a television producer alongside columnist and partner Victor Lewis-Smith resurrecting Associated-Rediffusion to become a BAFTA award-winning company. Lead vocalist Deborah Egan continued her career as a musician, after the group split in 1981, forming twelve piece The Mysterons and politically charged cabaret duo The Diplomats.

She has continued with as a cultural entrepreneur working internationally and across the UK, she received an OBE for her services to the cultural industries in the 2015 UK Honours List. Deborah is the cousin of Andy Macdonald founder of Go-Disc Records and Independiente and shared the early success of that label which launched and discovered Billy Bragg and had its first UK No.1 with The Housemartins Caravan of Love in 1986.

The name Acrobats of Desire was derived from the name of a chapter in Angela Carter's novel, The Infernal Desire Machines of Doctor Hoffman (1972). Mick Wilson (viola), who is now a successful painter, was one of the original members of the ensemble and the writer of all its original music.

Acrobats of Desire were a mainstay of Edinburgh Fringe Festival in the late 1970s and early 1980s, performing on many Fringe platforms including The Festival Club, Hill Street Theatre, St Andrews Theatre and the Grassmarket stage. They recorded and broadcast for the BBC2 Late Show, STV and Tyne Tees Television. Their last performance was at Futurama on September 13 as part of the Sci-Fi Festival in 1981 supporting Siouxsie and the Banshees and Echo and the Bunnymen while in turn were supported by a band from Dublin called U2. The performance was recorded by Granada Television and broadcast in the UK in October 1981.

Their EP, Parking Boys (Desire Records DES001) was recorded and produced by Camel's Andy Latimer at Foel Studio in Wales and mastered by Porky's Prime Cuts. It was distributed globally by Red Rhino Records and entered the independent charts in the UK and Italy it was featured by John Peel on his radio show .

Parking Boys was released in the final year of their career in 1981 and now has the status of a rare punk classic.
