= Francisco Ortega (footballer, born 1996) =

Argentine footballer

Personal information
- Full name: Francisco Ladislao Ortega
- Date of birth: 19 April 1996 (age 30)
- Place of birth: Centenario, Argentina
- Height: 1.88 m (6 ft 2 in)
- Position: Centre-back

Team information
- Current team: Atlético Pantoja
- Number: 6

Youth career
- Colón
- El Quillá
- 2013–2018: Atlético de Rafaela

Senior career*
Years	Team	Apps	(Gls)
2018–2020	Atlético de Rafaela	2	(0)
2019	→ Central Norte (loan)	9	(0)
2020	Central Norte	0	(0)
2021	9 de Julio	0	(0)
2021	Atlético Pantoja	24	(3)
2022	Jedinstvo Bihać	12	(1)
2022–	Atlético Pantoja	2	(0)
- * Club domestic league appearances and goals as of 16:35, 14 August 2022 (UTC)

Francisco Ladislao Ortega (born 19 April 1996) is an Argentine professional footballer who plays as a centre-back for Liga Dominicana club Atlético Pantoja.

== Career ==
Ortega spent seven years in the academy of Colón, which preceded a spell with El Quillá. In 2013, Ortega completed a move to Atlético de Rafaela. He was moved into their senior squad ahead of the 2018–19 Primera B Nacional, with the defender making his professional debut after featuring for the remaining twenty-seven minutes of a home win over Olimpo on 19 October 2018; he had previously appeared in their first-team when he was an unused substitute for a Copa Argentina tie with Defensores de Belgrano in the preceding July. Ortega spent six months on loan with Central Norte in early 2019, making nine appearances.

After securing promotion with Central Norte, Ortega returned to Atlético de Rafaela in July 2019 - before terminating his contract thirteen months later. At the end of November 2020, Ortega once again signed with Central Norté. However, Ortega didn't play any official matches for the club after his return to the club, since he tested positive for Coronavirus in December.

Prior to the start of the Liga Rafaelina de Fútbol, Club Atlético 9 de Julio announced the arrival of Ortega. However, on 25 March 2022 it was confirmed, that Ortega had left 9 de Julio to join Dominican club Atlético Pantoja. A year later, in March 2022, Ortega then signed for Bosnian First League club Jedinstvo Bihać. He returned to Atlético Pantoja in June 2022 again.

== Career statistics ==
As of 27 August 2020.

Club statistics
Club	Season	League			Cup		League Cup		Continental		Other		Total	
Club	Season	Division	Apps	Goals	Apps	Goals	Apps	Goals	Apps	Goals	Apps	Goals	Apps	Goals
Atlético de Rafaela	2018–19	Primera B Nacional	2	0	0	0	—		—		0	0	2	0
Atlético de Rafaela	2019–20	Primera B Nacional	0	0	0	0	—		—		0	0	0	0
Atlético de Rafaela	Total		2	0	0	0	—		—		0	0	2	0
Central Norte (loan)	2019	Federal Amateur	9	0	0	0	—		—		0	0	9	0
Career total			11	0	0	0	—		—		0	0	11	0
