= Francisco Ortega (writer) =

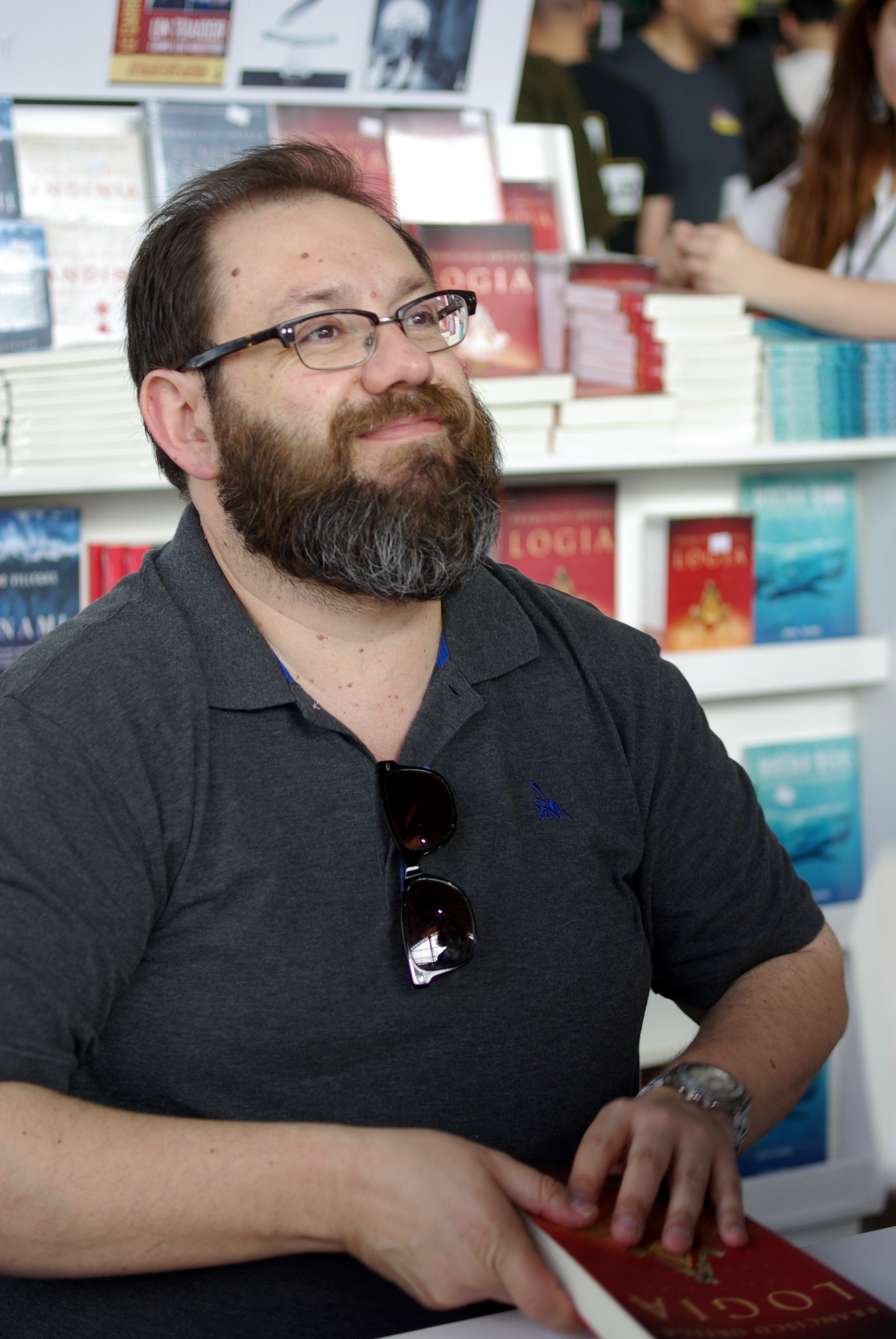
Francisco Ortega in FILSA 2016

Francisco Ortega (born Victoria, July 11, 1974) is a Chilean journalist, novelist, short story writer, screenwriter, podcaster and editor.

He works as a non-fiction editor, content advisor and contributor to magazines such as Rolling Stone and VIVE. Ortega also writes for different production companies and TV channels. He is the author of the novels 60 Kilómetros, El Número Kaifman, El Horror de Berkoff, the short story collection CHIL3, and the graphic novel 1899, which was one of the top 10 best-selling books in Chile for over 8 consecutive weeks. His short stories have been published in various anthologies.

In 2008 he started working on his most successful novel to date: Logia (Lodge), published by Planeta (2014). It soon became one of Chile's best-selling books for over 25 weeks. Following that record, the same publishers launch (2015) a remake of Número Kaifman (2006) known as Verbo Kaifman. Both Logia and Verbo Kaifman reached the top 10 for Chile's best-selling books in January 2015.

He is currently a professor at the Pontifical Catholic University of Chile, where he teaches editing.

== Awards and honors ==
- 2009. CNTV. Serie Adiós al Séptimo de Linea.

== Gallery ==
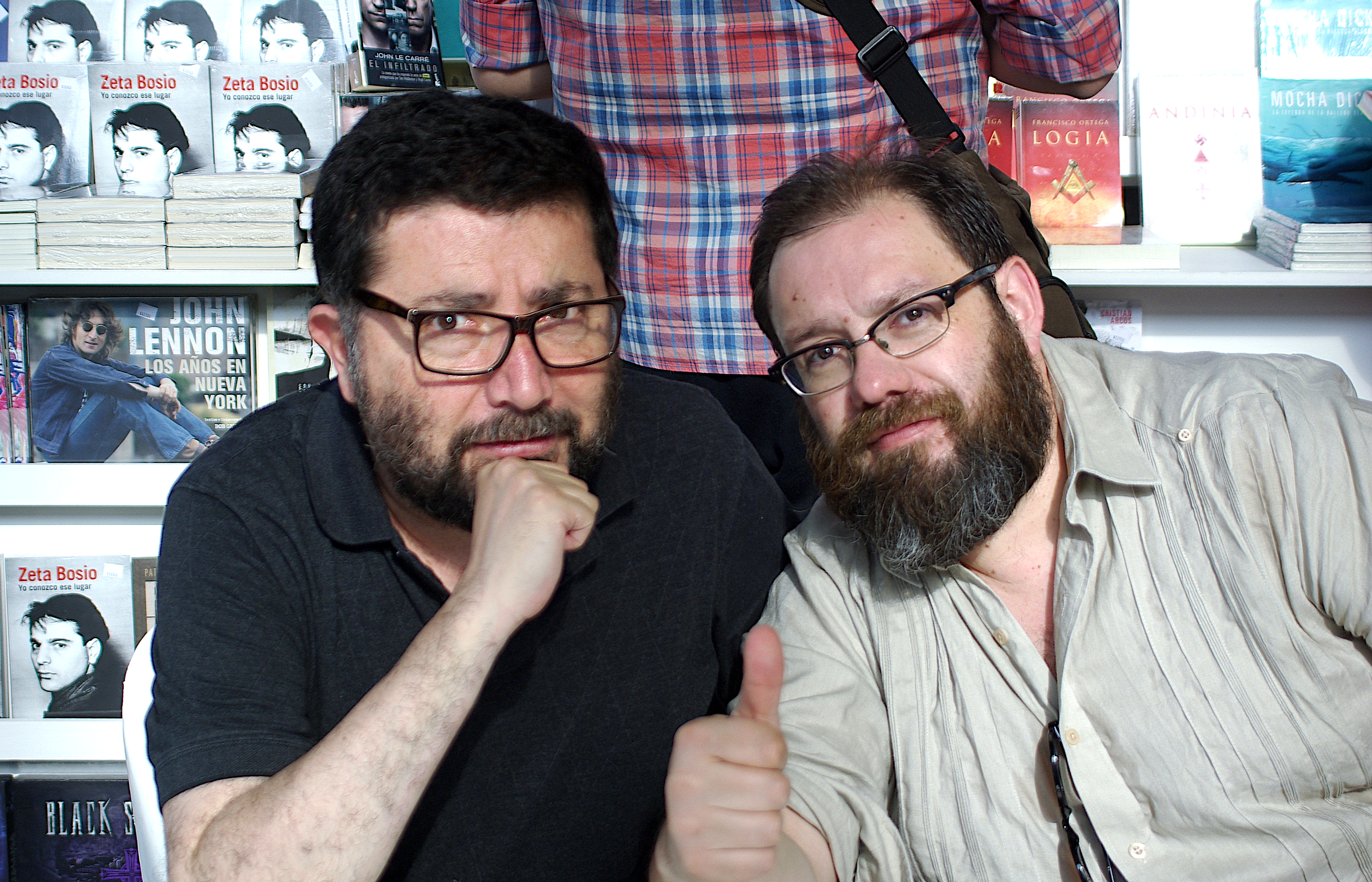
With coauthor Gonzalo Martínez

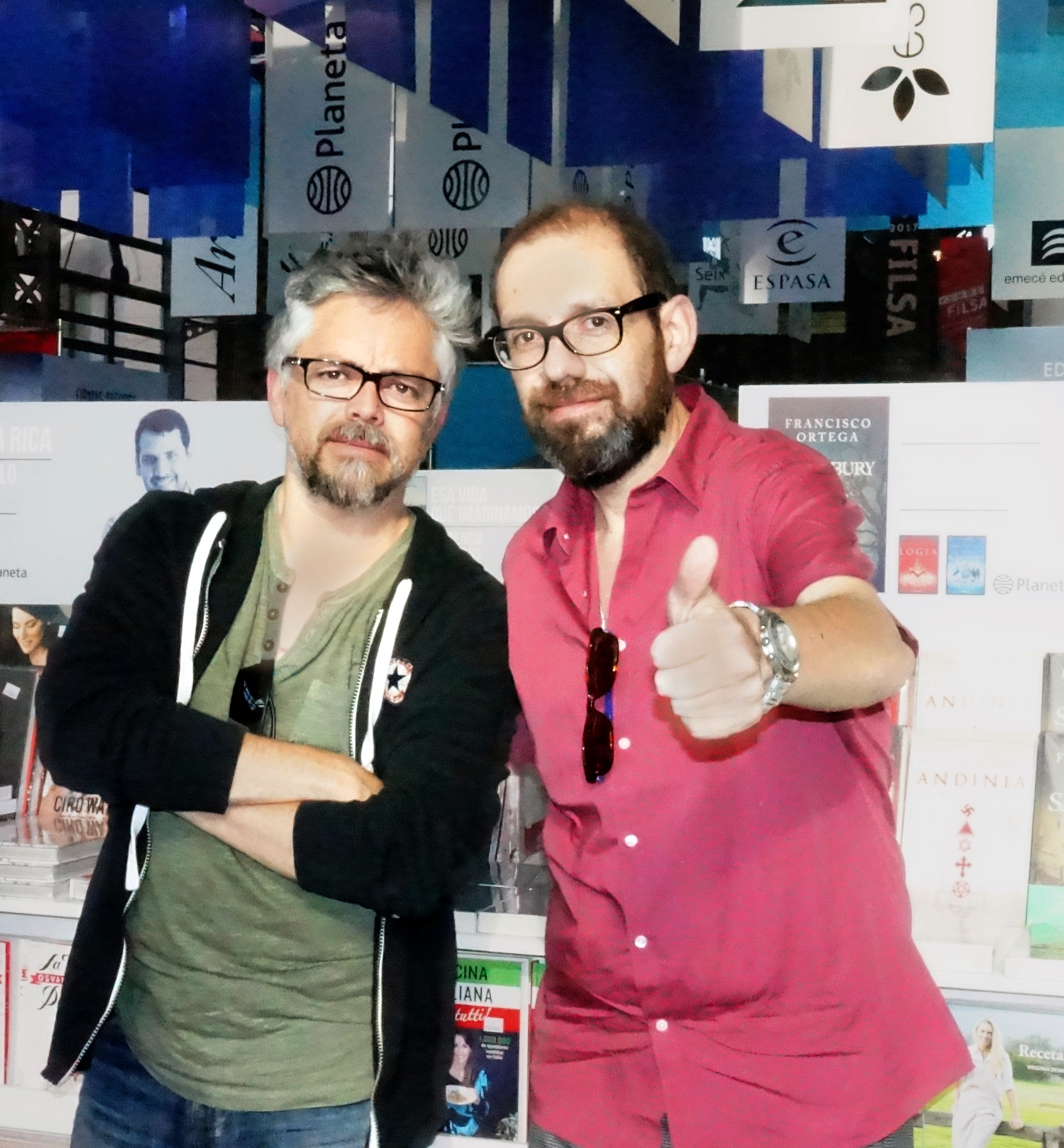
With Jorge Baradit at the FILSA 2017
