= TV Offal =

1997 British TV series

- Created by: Victor Lewis-Smith; Paul Sparks
- Starring: Victor Lewis-Smith
- Country of origin: United Kingdom
- Original language: English
- No. of episodes: 7

Production
- Running time: 25 min
- Production company: Associated-Rediffusion

Original release
- Network: Channel 4
- Release: 31 October 1997 – 26 June 1998

TV Offal is a British satirical comedy sketch/archive television series that ran on Channel 4 from 31 October 1997 to 26 June 1998. It was written and narrated by comedian and writer Victor Lewis-Smith, who shared writing duties with Paul Sparks. It ran for seven episodes (including the pilot), and is probably best known for first airing the uncensored Rainbow sketch on national television, as well as the "Gay Daleks" sketches.

The series covered generally obscure, rare or offensive excerpts of television footage from numerous media archives, usually accompanied by Lewis-Smith's biting commentary and cynical approach to what was being shown. Lewis-Smith used a variety of categories on the show to accompany a particular selection of programme footage. The show was also characterised by its musical score of campy jingles introducing the regular segments. These were produced in the 1980s style by the Dallas-based radio ID company JAM Creative Productions.

The programme was made by Associated-Rediffusion, the name of a TV company formerly serving the London area from 1955 to 1964 (and continuing as Rediffusion London until 1968). Lewis-Smith bought the name for his own production company when he discovered that it was dormant.

TV Offal has never been fully repeated, although a "best of" series entitled TV Offal Prime Cuts was aired in November 1999. Additionally, TV Offal episodes (including the pilot) have been uploaded to Youtube by the production company, with the Rainbow Sketch removed.

== Regular segments ==
The opening to each episode involved an imitated guest appearance from Professor Stephen Hawking, who's often shown conversing with either Lewis-Smith or one of the gay Daleks (who's convinced he's really Robert T. Ironside and so pesters Hawking for an autograph).

=== Honest Obituary ===
A satirical look at the death of either a current or generally obscure celebrity personality's "demise" followed by a satirical account of their contributions to the viewing public (which usually derails them) before revealing the exaggerated cause of death. The first few lines of the obituary are a list of very harsh criticisms, usually followed by "[his/her] critics were less kind". The deaths are usually announced using a piece of dubbed dialogue of the celebrity's name, mixing into BBC News footage of newsreader (Michael Buerk) saying "... who died today" in a bitter and traumatised manner. (From the news reports broadcast on the day that Princess Diana died.) Obituaries included Noel Edmonds, Andrew Lloyd Webber, Melvyn Bragg, Nigel Kennedy, Jeremy Clarkson, Vanessa Feltz, Two Fat Ladies and Jeremy Beadle.

=== Kamikaze Karaoke ===
Usually involves Lewis-Smith imitating various musicians to interpret how they sound "to him", usually mocking them in the process.

=== Assassination of the Week ===
This segment usually had two parts, with one part leading to the commercial breaks, challenging the viewer to depend on their memory to guess the outcome of a genuine assassination attempt aired on the show, and the second part resolving the outcome and whenever or not the victim survived or was killed ("did they live or are they worm food?"). Those featured were Inejiro Asanuma and Luis Donaldo Colosio (both killed), Park Chung-Hee (who survived but whose wife Yuk Young-soo was killed in the attempt), Imelda Marcos (who survived), John F. Kennedy (who was killed but whom Lewis-Smith said had survived in a fictitious "what really happened" segment) and Prince Charles (who survived but whom Lewis-Smith said was killed in an equally fictitious segment). In between the setting of the question and the reveal of the answer, viewers were usually treated to a bizarrely outdated television advertisement, such as an ad for the Daily Mirror produced in about 1960 (using the slogan "the Daily Mirror backs the young!" and ridiculing the "old guard" of British society) and an advert for the now discontinued Diocalm. The section was dropped from one episode when TV Offal instead used the original break titles from an episode of The Golden Shot during a piece satirising the game show.

=== Crappy TV Logo of the Week ===
A piece mocking the most poor or shoddy looking idents used by television channels, as well as the most under budget and mismanaged of obscure television studios, produced by students or otherwise.

=== Fantasy Programme of the Week ===
A "What If..." segment pondering aloud what certain celebrities would be doing if they chose a different action to affect the outcome of their productions, ranging from Roy Walker creating dirty versions of Catchphrase (a commentary on the infamous "Snake Charmer" outtake) to Richard Baker being drunk on the Last Night of the Proms ("which of course...he wasn't" claimed a sarcastic Lewis-Smith whilst introducing the segment).

=== The Pilots That Crashed ===
Rare and unaired pilots produced for possible series. Included such gems as "The Development of the Test Card", "Tubby the Tumour" and "It'll All End In Tiaras", a satire on monarchy. However, most of the programmes featured in this segment were not genuine pilots; the Test Card one was a self-produced video sold to Test Card enthusiasts, and "Tubby the Tumour," "Animal Hospice" and "It'll All End In Tiaras" were deliberate spoofs created for TV Offal by Victor Lewis-Smith.

=== The Gay Daleks ===
A series of interactions between two Michael Portillo obsessed, gay Daleks, travelling in a space/time machine called "The Turdis" (a play on the TARDIS and "turd", a countable noun for a piece of faeces), during the sketches, the pair treat their relationship with an argumentative, tense approach which often is ridden with their addressing relationship problems, crude bickering, and finally becoming so turned on by their arguing, that they begin to orgasm, leading to a variation of the classic Dalek catchphrase "Exterminate", now "Exsperminate". In the pilot episode, dubbed clips from the 1979 serial Destiny of the Daleks were used. A later attempt at reviving the Gay Daleks as an animated series was blocked by the Terry Nation Estate.

=== Satirical Song in the '80s Genre ===
Each episode would contain a song about a celebrity, with the exception of one song about 'Selling God'. "Its nice being [NAME]" The tune itself was always the same, but the lyrics were changed depending on the celebrity. The song would always end with the line: "..but now we must stop as our lawyer says that [NAME] will sue". Ironically one of the songs ("It's Nice Being Esther") was edited on legal advice when included as part of TV Offal Prime Cuts in 1999. Celebrities targeted included Esther Rantzen, Sir David Attenborough, Dale Winton, Loyd Grossman, Carol Vorderman, Chris Evans, and 'Selling God' which featured a variety of 'has-been celebs'.

The show would close with Lewis-Smith prank calling a variety of people, such as Hughie Green, Mary Whitehouse or the offices of Carlton Television, with initial good graces, before becoming more and more rude as the conversation continued.

== TV Offal Prime Cuts ==
In November 1999, TV Offal Prime Cuts was broadcast. It ran for four episodes and contained a mix of sketches and features from the past series.
