= Viña del Mar University =

Viña del Mar University (Universidad Viña del Mar)
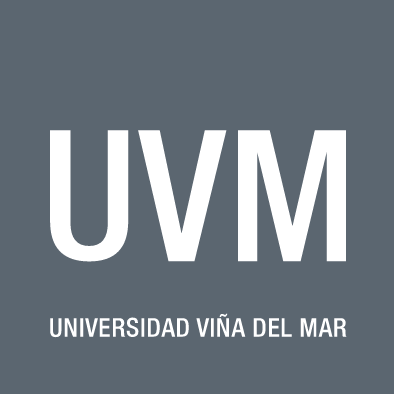
- Type: Private undergraduate college
- Rector: Carlos Isaac Pályi
- Students: 9,009 (2020)
- Undergraduates: 8,288
- Postgraduates: 721
- Address: Agua Santa 7055, Sector Rodelillo, Viña del Mar, Chile
- Website: www.uvm.cl

Viña del Mar University (Spanish: Universidad Viña del Mar, or UVM) is an autonomous, private institution of higher education recognized by the Ministry of Education of Chile. It was founded on November 21, 1988.

== History ==
Founded November 21, 1988, Viña del Mar University (UVM) of Chile is a private institution of higher education accredited since 2005 by National Commission of Accreditation, a branch of the Ministry of Education of Chile, granted the university institutional accreditation.

== Locations and schools ==
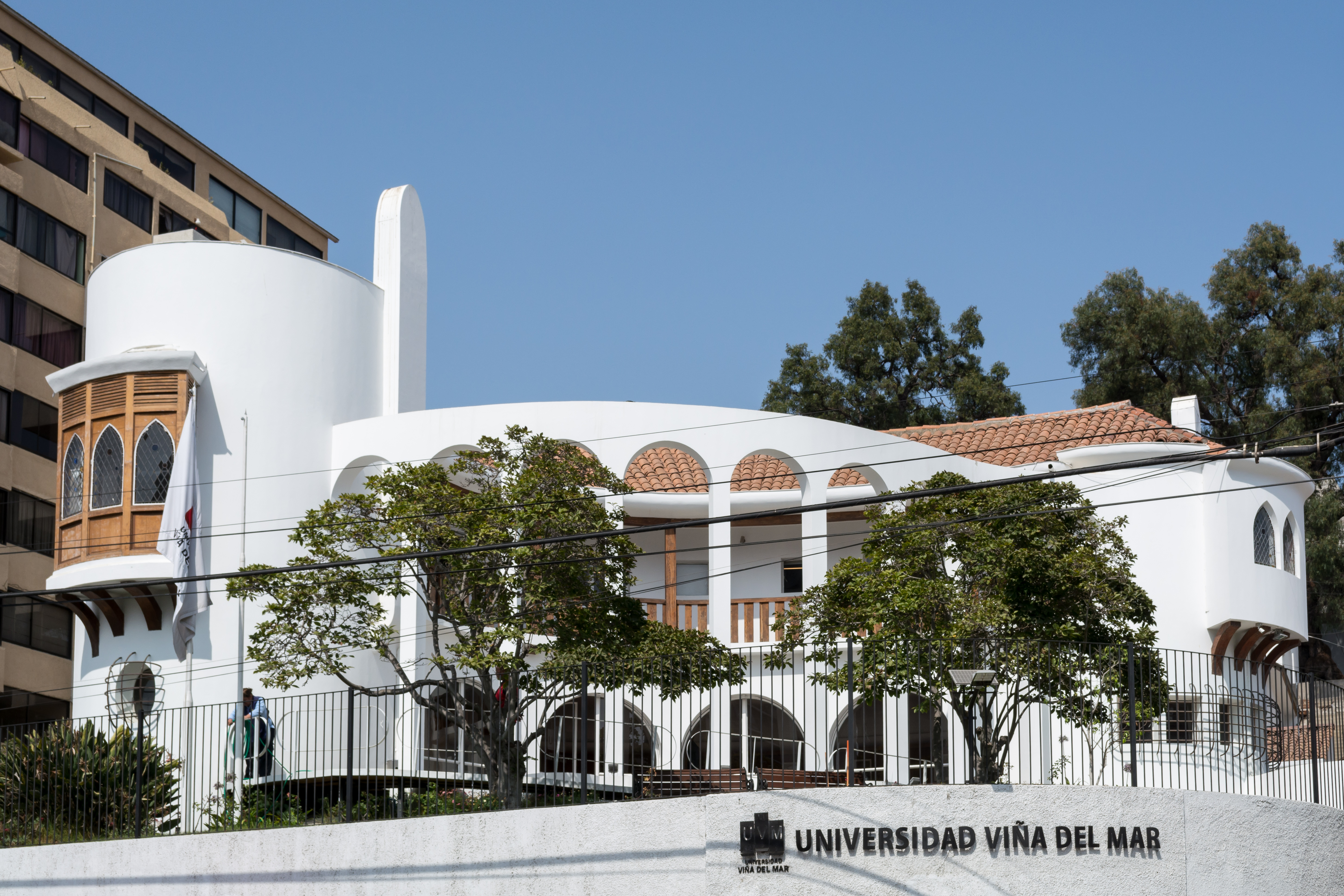
Casa Flores, a rectory of Viña del Mar University

Viña del Mar University consists of the Campus Rodelillo, in the upper part of the city of Viña del Mar, with an area of 20 hectares; the Agua Santa site, located in the central part of the city; and the San Felipe site, situated in San Felipe commune.

Academic Areas: Agricultural Sciences, Architecture and Design, Business Administrations, Communications, Education and Pedagogy, Engineering, Health Sciences, Law and Social Sciences, Veterinary Sciences.
