= Santiago International Book Fair =

Coordinates: 33.4322°S 70.6546°W

Feria Internacional del Libro de Santiago
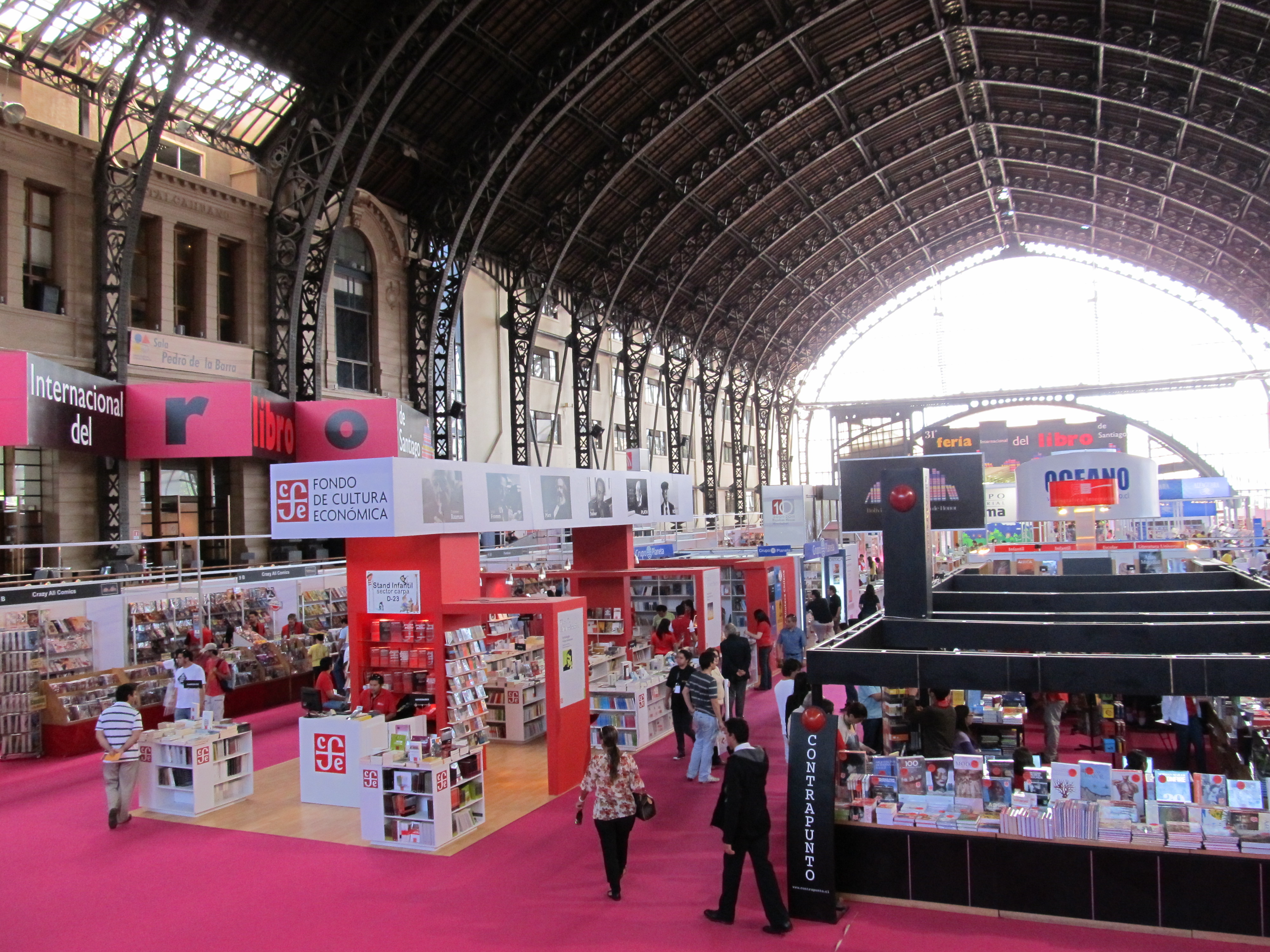
- Santiago International Book Fair in 2011
- Status: Active
- Genre: Multi-genre
- Venue: Estación Mapocho
- Locations: Santiago, Chile
- Country: Chile
- Inaugurated: 1981
- Organizer: Cámara Chilena del Libro
- Website: www.filsa.cl

The Santiago International Book Fair (Spanish: Feria Internacional del Libro de Santiago, FILSA) is an annual book fair held in Santiago, Chile, during October–December. It is organised by the Chilean Chamber for Books (Cámara Chilena del Libro).

== History ==
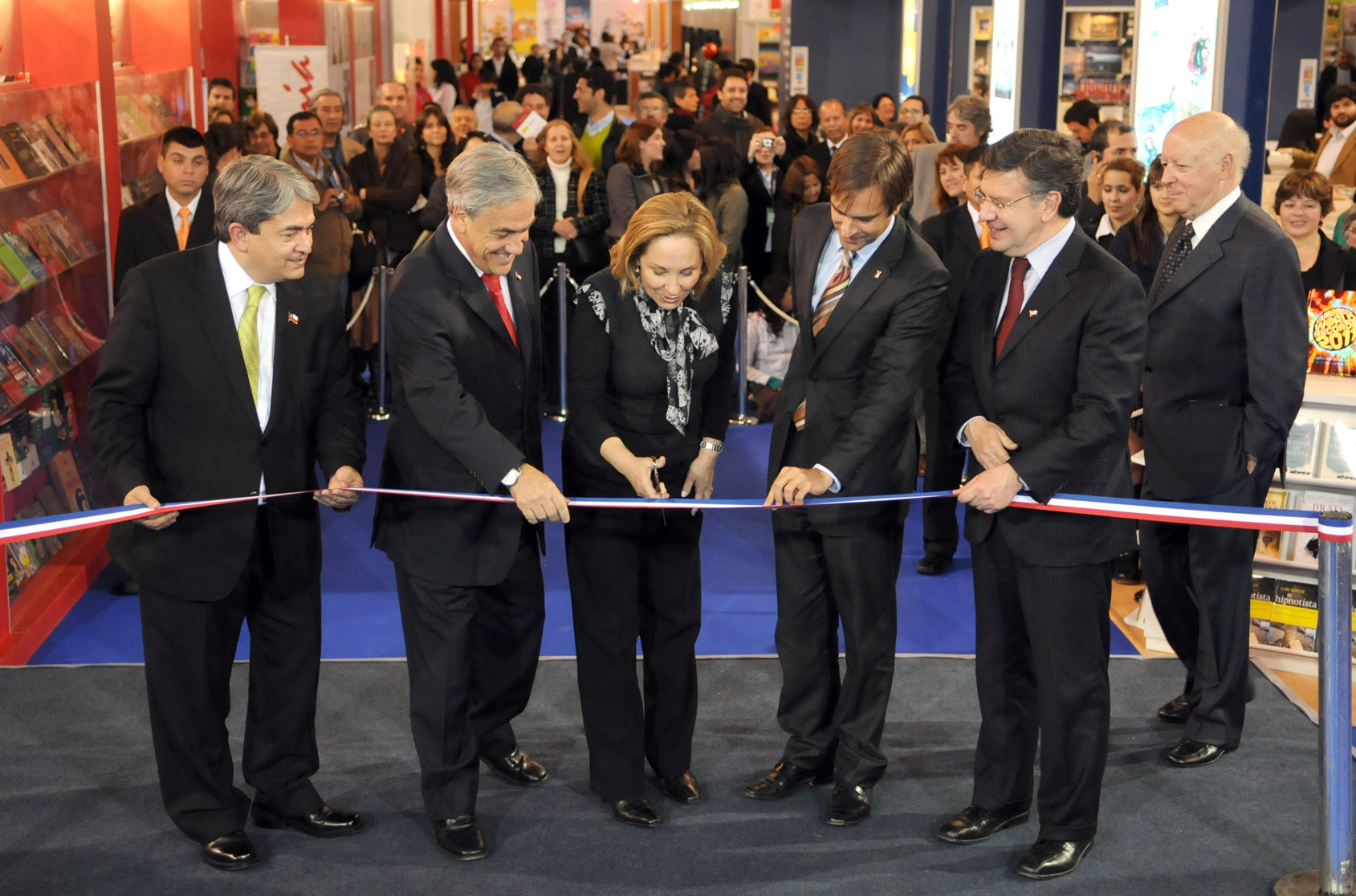
Opening of 2010 Santiago International Book Fair.

The Santiago Book Fair was created in 1981 as a national event, an initiative of then mayor of Santiago, Carlos Bombal. It was originally held in Parque Forestal, behind the National Museum of Fine Arts; from 1989 it has been held in the Estación Mapocho Cultural Center.

In 1990 the event was expanded to become an international book fair and in 2011, for the first time, it featured a section dedicated to electronic books. That year, a total of 260,000 people visited the book fair, with more than 500 cultural activities, 400 writers and more than 700 publishers represented in more than 10,000 metres squared of exhibits. In 2013, more than 300,000 people visited the fair.

From 1997 until 2012, each year a country was invited as honoured guest, with their literature and authors featured in exhibits. In 2013 and 2014, the fair featured the author as special guest.

From 2003, in the same place where the National Book Fair was held, the Parque Forestal Book Fair is held during January (summertime in Santiago), in the Juan Sebastian Bach Plaza/Museo de Arte Contemporáneo. This event is free.

== Book fairs by year ==
No.	Date	Theme	Honoured guest(s)
National Book Fair
I	20 November – 8 December 1981	—	—
II	26 November – 12 December 1982	—	—
III	24 November – 11 December 1983	—	—
IV	22 November – 9 December 1984	—	—
V	21 November – 8 December de 1985	—	—
VI	20 November – 8 December 1986	—	—
VII	19 November – 8 December 1987	—	—
VIII	24 November – 11 December 1988	—	—
IX	2 – 19 November 1989	The transition	—
International Book Fair
X	8 – 25 November 1990	Communication	—
XI	21 November – 8 December 1991	—	—
XII	5 October – 1 November 1992	—	—
XIII	18 November – 5 December 1993	Let's meet at the station	—
XIV	17 November – 4 December 1994	—	—
XV	14 November – 3 December 1995	—	—
XVI	21 November – 8 December 1996	—	—
XVII	21 November – 8 December 1997	Tell me something that doesn't die	Ecuador
XVIII	27 October – 8 November 1998	Where is this Titanic heading (man in the cyberworld)	Cuba
XIX	26 October – 7 November 1999	The value of the word	Canada
XX	30 October – 12 November 2000	Homage to a century	Peru
XXI	23 October – 4 November 2001	The passion of reading	France
XXII	22 October – 3 November 2002	Myths and legends	Uruguay
XXIII	28 October – 9 November 2003	The book: Humankind’s memory and footprint	Europe
XXIV	1 – 14 November 2004	Libraries: the ark of humankind	Mexico
XXV	25 October – 6 November 2005	A family celebration	Spain
XXVI	24 October – 5 November 2006	May no one be left out	Peru
XXVII	23 October – 4 November 2007	—	Brazil
XXVIII	31 October – 16 November 2008	—	Colombia; Chile
XXIX	30 October – 15 November 2009	The value of the word	Argentina; Chile
XXX	29 October – 14 November 2010	FILSA in the Bicentenary	Chile
XXXI	28 October – 13 November 2011	A meeting place	Bolivia
XXXII	25 October – 11 November 2012	A festival of books	Ecuador
XXXIII	25 October – 10 November 2013	A festival of readers	"The author"
XXXIV	23 October – 9 November 2014	Santiago is full of authors	"The author"
XXXV	22 October – 8 November 2015		Nordic countries
XXXVI	20 October – 6 November 2016		Mexico
XXXVII	26 October – 12 November 2017		Italy
XXXVIII	25 October – 11 November 2018		Peru
