= Ali Curung =

- Town
- Coordinates: 21°00′12″S 134°24′25″E
- Country: Australia
- State: Northern Territory
- LGA: Barkly Region
- Location: 170 km (110 mi) from Tennant Creek

Government
  - Territory electorate: Barkly
  - Federal division: Lingiari
- Elevation: 375 m (1,230 ft)

Population
  - Total: 394 (2021 census)
- Postcode: 0872
- Mean max temp: 32.3 °C (90.1 °F)
- Mean min temp: 16.6 °C (61.9 °F)
- Annual rainfall: 386.6 mm (15.22 in)

Ali Curung (Kaytetye: Alekarenge; formerly Warrabri) is an Indigenous Australian community in the Barkly Region of the Northern Territory. The community is located 170 km (106 mi) south of Tennant Creek, and 378 km (235 mi) north of Alice Springs. At the 2021 census, the community had a population of 394.

== History ==
The community was established as an Aboriginal reserve under the Northern Territory Aboriginals Act 1910 in 1956 by the Welfare Branch of the Northern Territory Administration when the water supply at the Phillip Creek settlement north of Tennant Creek was exhausted. Two bores were drilled during 1954, buildings were constructed during 1955, and the residents of Phillip Creek were transported to Warrabri in mid 1956. The settlement was officially opened on 23 September 1958. It was managed by a superintendent and other non-Indigenous staff. Accommodation for the white staff consisted of Riley Newsum buildings, Bellevue pre-cut houses and Nissen huts. Administrative functions were housed in Nissen and Romney huts. Aboriginal residents initially built shacks from corrugated iron and bush timber. By 1958, some brick houses and some aluminium houses had been constructed. The settlement also had an electricity generator, airstrip, garage, and general and agricultural stores; vegetable garden and yards for pigs, goats and poultry; a school, an infirmary, a recreation hut, and a dining room where meals were provided.

== Name ==
The settlement was originally named Warrabri, formed from the names of the two main groups of Aboriginal people who were moved there: Warumungu (then spelt Warramunga) and Warlpiri (then spelt Wailbri). After the Aboriginal Land Rights Act 1976 was passed, and Aboriginal reserves became Aboriginal land, the name was changed to Ali Curung, based on the name of sites within 6 km north of the community related to the Dog (or Dingo) Dreaming, called Alekarenge ("dog/dingo-associated") in the language of the traditional owners of the area, the Kaytetye people and in Alyawarr.

== Geography ==
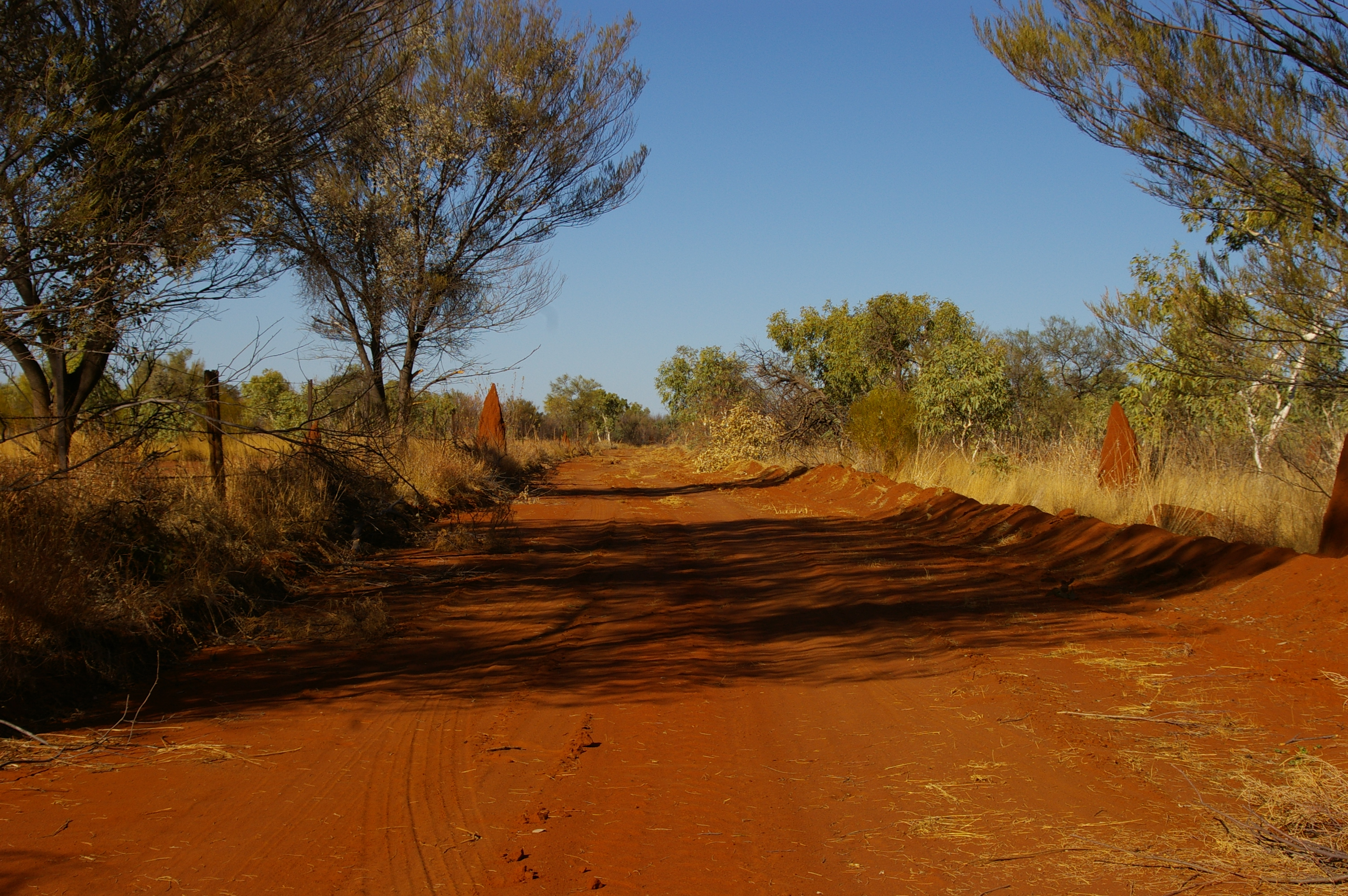
Unsealed road in red sand country near Ali Curung

The climate of Ali Curung is arid, and the country around Ali Curung is dry for most of the year, with no surface water in creeks or waterholes. Water was traditionally obtained by digging at soakages. The landscape is characterised by red sand plains and low ridges, with extensive areas of open spinifex grassland. There are areas of scattered bloodwood (Corymbia opaca) and dogwood (Acacia sericophylla) trees, and shrublands and low woodlands of red-bud mallee shrub (Eucalyptus pachyphylla), mulga (Acacia aneura) and witchetty bush (Acacia kempeana), with some desert white gums (Corymbia aparrerinja), smooth-barked coolibah (Eucalyptus victrix) and Hakea chordophylla north of Ali Curung.

== Population and languages ==
By 1958, two years after its establishment, the maximum number of Aboriginal residents was 367 (in January–February), while the minimum number was 258 (in July). There were thirteen non-Indigenous staff employed there. The population in 1965 was 590; by around 1980, it had increased to about 790-830. Of those, about 70-80 (as of 1976-1977) were non-Indigenous. The Aboriginal population in the late 1970s comprised 35% Warlpiri, 20% Warumungu and Warlmanpa, 30-35% Alyawarra and 10-15% Kaytetye. Warlpiri and Warumungu people tend to live in the west side of the community, and Alyawarra and Kaytetye to the east, orientating themselves in relation to their traditional country.

At the 2021 census, the community had a population of 394, of whom 88.1% were Indigenous Australians. 23.1% of people reported speaking only English at home; 36.0% reported speaking Warlpiri at home, 26.6% spoke Alyawarr, 2.0% spoke Kaytetye, and 0.6% spoke Warumungu at home.

== Climate ==
Climate data for Ali Curung, elevation 375 m (1,230 ft), (1991–2014 normals, extremes 1988–2014)
Month	Jan	Feb	Mar	Apr	May	Jun	Jul	Aug	Sep	Oct	Nov	Dec	Year
Record high °C (°F)	46.1 (115.0)	44.8 (112.6)	41.9 (107.4)	39.3 (102.7)	36.6 (97.9)	33.3 (91.9)	34.2 (93.6)	35.4 (95.7)	40.4 (104.7)	42.1 (107.8)	44.5 (112.1)	46.0 (114.8)	46.1 (115.0)
Mean daily maximum °C (°F)	37.7 (99.9)	36.8 (98.2)	35.5 (95.9)	32.3 (90.1)	27.4 (81.3)	24.2 (75.6)	24.3 (75.7)	27.0 (80.6)	32.3 (90.1)	34.9 (94.8)	36.7 (98.1)	37.8 (100.0)	32.2 (90.0)
Mean daily minimum °C (°F)	23.7 (74.7)	23.1 (73.6)	20.8 (69.4)	16.4 (61.5)	11.7 (53.1)	8.3 (46.9)	7.4 (45.3)	9.1 (48.4)	15.0 (59.0)	18.6 (65.5)	21.2 (70.2)	23.1 (73.6)	16.5 (61.8)
Record low °C (°F)	15.8 (60.4)	15.3 (59.5)	10.1 (50.2)	5.9 (42.6)	1.0 (33.8)	−2.5 (27.5)	−1.2 (29.8)	−1.0 (30.2)	4.2 (39.6)	7.3 (45.1)	11.3 (52.3)	14.8 (58.6)	−2.5 (27.5)
Average rainfall mm (inches)	76.4 (3.01)	92.3 (3.63)	27.1 (1.07)	16.6 (0.65)	15.9 (0.63)	7.0 (0.28)	5.9 (0.23)	2.4 (0.09)	11.6 (0.46)	22.6 (0.89)	35.0 (1.38)	66.2 (2.61)	379 (14.93)
Average rainy days (≥ 1.0 mm)	5.7	6.8	2.6	1.4	1.8	0.8	0.9	0.5	1.4	2.8	3.8	6.0	34.5
Source: Australian Bureau of Meteorology (rain 1991-2015)

== Governance ==
When first established, the settlement was managed by a superintendent, and the Aboriginal residents were wards of the Chief Protector of Aborigines under the Aboriginals Ordinance 1918. The Aboriginal Land Rights Commission report of 1974 recommended that land in Aboriginal reserves pass to Aboriginal ownership, which occurred with the enactment of the Aboriginal Land Rights (Northern Territory) Act in January 1977. Title to the Warrabri reserve, along with other NT Aboriginal reserves, was handed to Aboriginal land trusts by the then Minister for Aboriginal Affairs, Ian Viner, at Amoonguna on 4 September 1978. A council had existed at Warrabri prior to 1977, with Aboriginal membership, largely from the west side groups in the community. From 1977, following a directive of the Department of Aboriginal Affairs, elections were held for a council which was more representative of local groups. The Ali Curung Community Government Council continued to operate until the 2008 reform of local government areas by the Northern Territory Government, when Ali Curung became part of the Alyawarr ward of the Barkly Shire (from 2014, the Barkly Regional Council).

In 2007, Ali Curung became a "prescribed community" under the Northern Territory National Emergency Response; among other impacts, the Australian federal government compulsorily acquired a five-year lease over Ali Curung, a Government Business Manager was installed, and residents receiving social security payments were placed on an income management system under which fifty per cent of their payments were "quarantined", and could only be spent on "priority needs".

== Economy ==
During the period when it was managed by the Welfare Branch, some Aboriginal people living at Warrabri, as it was then, were employed outside the settlement in the pastoral and droving industries. Others worked in the routine jobs in the settlement.

At the time of the 2021 census, in a population of 394, 123 people reported being in the paid work force, of whom 35.0% were unemployed, 31.6% worked part-time, and 38.5% were employed full-time.

== Education ==
The Warrabri School opened on 9 May 1956. A manual training centre for senior school students and young people over school age was established in 1959, providing training in domestic science for girls and woodwork, leatherwork and blacksmithing for boys.

As of 2019, Alekarenge School provides education from preschool to middle school.

== Recreation and culture ==
The Ali Curung football team, the Kangaroos, have been members of the Barkly Australian Football League since its founding in 1991.

Culture festivals have been held in Ali Curung at various times, including the Pulapa Wirri ("big dance") in 1975 and 1976. The Ali Curung Dance Festival has been held annually during NAIDOC Week celebrations since at least 2010.

Bands which have originated in or have members from Ali Curung include the Ali-Curung Sundowners, led by Gus Williams; the Warrabri Blue Grass Group; the Ali-Curung Spinifex Band, and Band Nomadic.

An arts centre, the Arlpwe Arts Centre and Gallery, owned by the Arlpwe Artists Aboriginal Corporation, started in 2008. The name relates to the landscape around Ali Curung, "no waterhole, no rivers, only soakage and grass country" from the Kaytetye country name Arlpawe and common noun arlpawe 'wide open space, clearing, flat country with no watercourses or hills'.

A ninety minute film titled Kain, based on the story of Cain and Abel, was filmed partly at Warrabri by the ABC and BBC, and broadcast on the ABC in 1967. It starred Keith Michell, J. G. Devlin and Candy Devine, with Teddy Plummer, Michael Williams and other Ali Curung locals.

No alcohol has ever been available or permitted at Ali Curung; the nearest liquor outlet is at Wycliffe Well roadhouse on the Stuart Highway.

== Notable people ==
In 1970, Teddy Plummer (Warumungu), a foundation member of the Warrabri Cooperative, a member of the Warrabri Field Council, and later a president of Ali Curung Council, was awarded a British Empire Medal for services to the community. A road in Ali Curung is named Plummer Crescent in his honour. Other past presidents of the Ali Curung Council, after whom streets in Ali Curung are named, include Billy Foster (Warumungu), Jack Jackson (Warlpiri) and Jimmy Newcastle (Warlmanpa/ Mudburra). Roads are also named after George Brown (Warumungu/Warlpiri), the first Aboriginal police aide in Ali Curung; Tommy and Charlie Driver (Warlpiri), who were influential in the establishment of Warrabri; and Pete Peterson (Alyawarr), who helped keep harmony in Warrabri. Country musician Gus Williams, from Ntaria, lived in Warrabri from 1976 to the early 1980s. Long Pwerle, land rights activist and chairman of the Central Land Council from 1988 to 1992, died at his home in Ali Curung in 1992.

In Daughters of the Dreaming, anthropologist Diane Bell wrote about many senior women in Ali Curung in the late 1970s who had knowledge and authority in ritual, kinship, ancestral landscapes and natural resources, referring to them by skin names rather than personal names.
