= Desert oak =

Desert oak may refer to several Australian tree species with narrow, needle-like leaves or stems, including:

- Acacia coriacea
- Acacia sericophylla
- Allocasuarina decaisneana
