= Acacia coriacea subsp. coriacea =

Scientific classification
- Kingdom: Plantae
- Clade: Tracheophytes
- Clade: Angiosperms
- Clade: Eudicots
- Clade: Rosids
- Order: Fabales
- Family: Fabaceae
- Subfamily: Caesalpinioideae
- Clade: Mimosoid clade
- Genus: Acacia
- Species: A. coriacea
- Subspecies: A. c. subsp. coriacea

Trinomial name
- Acacia coriacea subsp. coriacea DC.

Subspecies of legume

Acacia coriacea subsp. coriacea, commonly known as dogwood or wirewood is a subspecies of Acacia coriacea that is endemic to Western Australia. It is a bushy, erect, sometimes semi-prostrate or wind-pruned shrub or tree with mostly erect, linear to very narrowly elliptic phyllodes, yellow to cream-coloured flowers and openly curved pods.

== Description ==
Acacia coriacea subsp. coriacea is a bushy, erect, sometimes semi-prostrate or wind-pruned shrub or tree that typically grows to a height of 1–3 m (3 ft 3 in – 9 ft 10 in). Its phyllodes are mostly erect, linear to very narrowly elliptic, straight or slightly curved, 90–220 mm (3.5–8.7 in) long, 2–7 mm (0.079–0.276 in) wide and silvery- or grey-green. The flowers are borne in one or two spherical heads on a peduncle usually 4–10 mm (0.16–0.39 in) long, each head with 15 to 50 yellow to cream-coloured flowers. Flowering occurs in June and July, and the pods are 5–10 mm (0.20–0.39 in) long and curved into a half or full circle.

== Taxonomy ==
Acacia coriacea subsp. coriacea was first formally described in 1993 by Richard Cown and Bruce Maslin in the journal Nuytsia.

== Distribution and habitat ==
This subspecies of Acacia coriacea is mostly commonly found on coastal dunes or on beach sand along the coast and offshore islands between Dirk Hartog Island and Dorre Island, and Point Samson in the north of Western Australia.

A disjunct population north of the Tanami Desert in the Northern Territory is now regarded as Acacia sericophylla.

== Conservation status ==
Acacia coriacea subsp. coriacea is listed as "not threatened" by the Western Australian Government Department of Biodiversity, Conservation and Attractions.

== See also ==
- List of Acacia species
