= Acacia coriacea subsp. pendens =

Weeping wirewood

Scientific classification
- Kingdom: Plantae
- Clade: Tracheophytes
- Clade: Angiosperms
- Clade: Eudicots
- Clade: Rosids
- Order: Fabales
- Family: Fabaceae
- Subfamily: Caesalpinioideae
- Clade: Mimosoid clade
- Genus: Acacia
- Species: A. coriacea
- Subspecies: A. c. subsp. pendens

Trinomial name
- Acacia coriacea subsp. pendens R.S.Cowan & Maslin

Subspecies of legume

Acacia coriacea subsp. pendens, also known as weeping wirewood or leather-leaf wattle, is a subspecies of Acacia coriacea (river jam) that is endemic to the Pilbara region of Western Australia.

== See also ==
- List of Acacia species
