= Hunted (1972 film) =

1971 British film by Peter Crane

- Theatrical release poster
- Directed by: Peter Crane
- Screenplay by: Michael Sloan
- Produced by: Michael Sloan; Peter Crane
- Starring: Edward Woodward; June Ritchie
- Cinematography: Brian Jonson
- Edited by: Martin Winterton
- Music by: Graham Dee; Gerry Shury
- Production company: The Pemini Organisation
- Release date: 10 February 1972
- Running time: 41 minutes
- Country: United Kingdom
- Language: English

Hunted is a 1972 British two-hander dramatic short film directed by Peter Crane and starring Edward Woodward and June Ritchie. The screenplay was by Michael Sloan, who co-produced the film with Crane for their independent company The Pemini Organisation.

== Plot ==
Estate agent Margaret Lord is showing John Drummond the small office he is interested in renting. Suddenly he locks the door and tells her that at noon he is going to shoot people in the street below. She tries to reason with him. As he assembles his hitherto concealed shotgun he tells her that his wife has left him for another man, taking their children. When noon comes he shoots into the street. The police arrive. He shoots at Margaret but she is not injured. His shotgun is loaded with blanks. He goes to the window, shoots several times into the street, and is then shot in the head by a police marksman.

== Cast ==
- Edward Woodward as John Drummond
- June Ritchie as Margaret Lord

== Production ==
In a 1972 interview for The Daily Mirror Ritchie said: “I don’t think there was a big budget for the picture. It was shot on goodwill, patience and faith. We all settled for a percentage of the profits."

== Critical reception ==
The Monthly Film Bulletin wrote: "Although laudable as an attempt at a 'serious' featurette, Hunted unfortunately never escapes from the limitations imposed by its obviously tiny budget and by the earnest theatricality of its script. Action and dialogue alike seem to have been much influenced by Bogdanovich's Targets [1968], but here the basic idea of a sniper proves little more than an excuse for a highly contrived dramatic situation whose pace and content are continually dictated by the necessity of remaining within the production's only set. And Edward Woodward's attempts to bring the gun-fixated character to life are largely vitiated by the incongruity of the last-minute revelation that his own weapon contains only blanks."

== Remake ==
The film was remade for television in 1988 by NBC as the two-part Alfred Hitchcock Presents: The Hunted, also starring Woodward, for which he received a 1989 Emmy nomination for Outstanding Guest Actor In A Drama Series.

== Home media ==
Hunted was released on Blu-ray as part of the collection The Pemini Organisation (1972–1974) (Powerhouse Films, 2022) with two other films also directed by Crane and written by Sloan: Assassin (1973) and Moments (1974).
