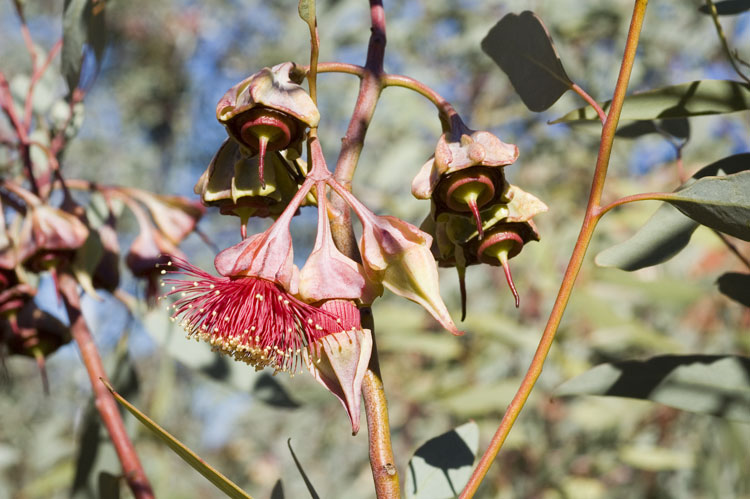
- Eucalyptus alatissima in the Adelaide Botanic Garden

Conservation status
- Least Concern (IUCN 3.1)

Scientific classification
- Kingdom: Plantae
- Clade: Tracheophytes
- Clade: Angiosperms
- Clade: Eudicots
- Clade: Rosids
- Order: Myrtales
- Family: Myrtaceae
- Genus: Eucalyptus
- Species: E. alatissima

Binomial name
- Eucalyptus alatissima (Brooker & Hopper) D.Nicolle

Synonyms
- Eucalyptus kingsmillii subsp. alatissima Brooker & Hopper; Eucalyptus pachyphylla F.Muell.; Eucalyptus kingsmillii (Maiden) Maiden & Blakely

= Eucalyptus alatissima =

Wing-fruited mallee

Species of eucalyptus

Eucalyptus alatissima is a mallee that is endemic to central parts of the Great Victoria Desert. It has rough bark on the lower part of its stems, smooth tan to cream-coloured bark on its upper parts, egg-shaped to lance-shaped leaves and buds in groups of three. The buds have a powdery covering and are prominently winged.

== Description ==
Eucalyptus alatissima is a multi-stemmed mallee, or occasionally a single-stemmed tree and typically grows to a height of 8 metres (26 ft). It has smooth, tan to cream bark on the upper parts and rough grey fibrous to ribbon-like bark toward the base. Leaves on young plants are egg-shaped to broadly lance-shaped, dull and bluish, usually with a powdery surface. The adult leaves are dull green to grey-green, egg-shaped to lance-shaped, 60–100 millimetres (2.4–3.9 in) long and 15–20 mm (0.6–0.8 in) wide. The flowers are arranged in umbels of three in leaf axils. Mature flower buds are reddish, more or less spherical to oval, 32–45 millimetres (1.3–1.8 in) long and 15–30 mm (0.6–1.2 in) wide. Both the flower cup and operculum have a powdery covering and have prominent longitudinal wings, the operculum longer than the flower cup. It blooms between July and October producing inflorescences with pink to red or rarely yellow flowers. The fruit are woody capsules14–20 mm (0.55–0.79 in) long and 25–45 mm (0.98–1.77 in) wide with prominent longitudinally winged ridges. The fruits contain pyramidally shaped dark grey seeds that are 4 mm (0.16 in) long.

== Taxonomy ==
This eucalypt was first formally described in 1993 as Eucalyptus kingsmillii subsp. alatissima by the botanists Ian Brooker and Stephen Hopper in the journal Nuytsia. In 2013 it was raised to species status by Dean Nicolle in his book Native eucalypts of South Australia. The name of the species is commonly misapplied to Eucalyptus kingsmillii and Eucalyptus pachyphylla. The specific epithet (alatissima) is the superlative form of the Latin word alatus meaning winged, hence "most winged" or "very much so", referring to the prominently winged buds and fruit.

== Distribution and habitat ==
This mallee grows in gravelly red sands and loam in mallee vegetation or mulga scrub near the South Australia-Western Australia border. It is found in central parts of the Great Victoria Desert between Vokes Hill in South Australia and Neale Junction east of Laverton in Western Australia. Its range includes parts of the Goldfields region.

== Conservation ==
Eucalyptus alatissima is classified as "not threatened" in Western Australia by the Western Australian Government Department of Parks and Wildlife.

== See also ==
- List of Eucalyptus species
