= List of Murder, She Wrote characters =

This is a list of characters in the Murder, She Wrote series. They are all characters who have appeared in a Murder, She Wrote episode or related book.

== Characters by surname ==
=== A ===
- Marjorie Ainsworth is a mystery writer based out of London and a friend of Jessica, whom she met through PD James. Marjorie is mentioned throughout Donald Bain’s books, but only appears in the first.
- Ona Ainsworth-Zara is Marjorie Ainsworth’s younger sister.
- Dan Andrews is the editor of the Cabot Cove Gazette. He appears periodically in the novels by Donald Bain, and Terrie Farley Moran.

=== B ===
- Samuel Booth is the mayor of Cabot Cove, and is played by Richard Paul in the television series. The character also appears as mayor in the books by Jon Land, but not by Donald Bain.
- Deputy Andy Broom, is a police officer in Cabot Cove. He appears in 24-episodes of the series, and is portrayed by Louis Herthum.

=== C ===
- Hepzibah Cabot was the wife of Winfred, she murdered him and then threw herself off a cliff, which became known as the Legend of Cabot Cove.
- John Henry Cabot was a hero of the Revolutionary War. A master strategist who commanded a cavalry regiment under general Nathanial Green. He distinguished himself at both the battle of Gilford Courthouse and the battle of Hopkirks Hill. While Green remained in the southern theater waging guerilla war against the far superiors numbers of General Charles Cornwallis, Cabot took over command of the Continental Army's troops from Rhode Island northward, including portions of New York. His name went on to later be used as the name of the town Cabot Cove, ME, in Jon Land's novels.
- Winfred Cabot was the founder of Cabot Cove in the Donald Bain novels.
- Pamela Crane (née MacGill) is the daughter of Marshall MacGill, and niece of Jessica Fletcher. After a swim, she found her husband Johnny dead by suicide.
- Ethan Cragg is a fishing boat captain, and friend of Jessica Fletcher. Cragg only appeared in the first season. He was to be Jessica’s best-friend, but the that position was replaced with Seth. He was portrayed by Claude Akins.

=== D ===
- Lucas Darling is the unpaid secretary for the International Society of Mystery Writers.

=== F ===
- Beatrice Fletcher is the great-great-niece of Jessica, and the granddaughter of Grady and Donna. She first appeared in the young adult spin-off series by Stephanie Kuehn, originally published in October 2022. Beatrice is biracial daughter of Grady and Donna's son Frank (named after Grady's uncle).
- Donna Fletcher (née Mayberry) was played by Debbie Zipp. Donna married Grady Fletcher in an episode of the fifth season called "Something Borrowed, Someone Blue". Donna had previously appeared in two episodes, the first of which was "Just Another Fish Story," in which she was detained for the murder that had occurred in that episode but it was later determined that it was an act of self-defence. A year later, she married Grady. Although it was subsequently established that she simply followed that profession to please her father, she is a very shy girl who was also an accountant like her father. She ended up giving up accounting after the first time we saw her to be a normal housewife, much to the horror of her father. Donna's father was Franklin Mayberry, a very successful and ruthless accountant, whom Grady had at one point worked for and was fired by, although by the time we meet Franklin it seems that he has already forgotten this, as Donna said he probably would have. Donna's mother was Maisie Mayberry, an extremely neurotic woman who spent most of the wedding worrying about one thing or another. Also at the wedding were Donna's paternal Uncle Ben, and her maternal Uncle Ziggy with his new wife Valerie. Debbie Zipp also appeared in season 3, episode 21, "The Days Dwindle Down" as character Terry.
- Frank Fletcher is the unseen deceased husband of Jessica. In his youth he fought in the Air Force during the Korean War. Frank never shared the ugly parts of the war with Jessica when he returned, even while he was deployed his letters were, "quite cheery." He would also smoke tobacco out of a pipe.
- Frank Fletcher (II) is the son of Grady and Donna. In the Stephanie Kuehn books, Frank is the father of Beatrice and runs a technology company out of Cabot Cove.
- Grady Ambrose Fletcher is the nephew of the show's lead character Jessica Fletcher and was played by Michael Horton. Specifically, Grady was the son of Frank Fletcher's late brother. Frank was the husband of Jessica. It was Grady who, after secretly reading Jessica's first novel The Corpse Danced at Midnight, had it published. Although Jessica seems to have a never-ending collection of nieces and nephews, it is Grady that could be easily considered the closest thing she has to a son. In the series viewers learn that Grady was raised in part by Jessica and her husband Frank, after Grady's parents were killed in a car accident. Bumbling, but good-natured, Grady seemed to always be moving from accounting job to accounting job. When he did have a job, murder would quickly follow. Usually a too-trusting Grady was accused of the murder and needed his Aunt Jessica to find the real killer. His job troubles were about as bad as his difficulties with women. Grady, the shy innocent type, frequently had trouble finding a regular girl. He did eventually marry equally shy Donna Mayberry. His job troubles and women troubles converge when he finds out he worked for, and was fired by, Donna's father. Grady and Donna had a son in the series, whom they name Frank, after Grady's Uncle.
- Jessica Fletcher – A mystery writer and amateur detective, she is the protagonist and central character of the series. Fletcher is a retired teacher-turned-author of detective fiction, but constantly finds that her work and personal life overlap. In every episode, she is introduced into a situation where someone is killed shortly after her arrival. She is generally forced to solve every mystery herself in the style of one of the characters from her book, as the police prove to be incapable of doing so without her help.

=== G ===
- Charles "Charlie" Garrett is a private investigator that Jessica encounters very often. He is portrayed by Wayne Rogers.
- Preston Giles was the head of the Sutton Place Publishing which published Jessica's first book, The Corpse Danced at Midnight. He was convicted of murder, and was released in 1990. He was portrayed by Canadian actor Arthur Hill. Giles was one of the few male characters to ever kiss Jessica on the lips.
- Howard Griffin is the boyfriend, and eventual husband of Victoria. He is played twice by Jeff Conaway, and his third appearance is portrayed by Dean Butler.
- Victoria Griffin (née Brandon) is the niece of Jessica. Throughout the series she is portrayed by Genie Francis.

=== H ===
- Michael Hagarty is a British MI6 agent of Irish origin, who would appear when Jessica least expected him to drag her into a dangerous case. He appeared in the television series, and in the novels. He was played by Len Cariou.
- Dr. Seth Hazlitt was played by William Windom. He first appeared in the second series. He is Cabot Cove’s leading physician and Jessica Fletcher’s best friend. Under the crusty Maine exterior is a dedicated doctor with real compassion for his patients, a nurturing side that sometimes manifests itself in Seth’s protective tendencies toward Jessica. Seth is a widower, his wife Ruth having died before the series began. In the series four episode "Curse of the Daanau," Seth receives an invitation from his estranged brother's wife. The two reconcile after 30 years only for the brother to be murdered shortly after. NOTE: He first appeared playing the role as one of the friends/ murder's in Funeral at Fifty Mile. 1985
- Bruce Herbert is Marjorie Ainsworth’s New York agent.
- Lois Hoey is a resident of Cabot Cove and member of the PTA who is also a friend of Jessica's. Appears in the pilot and another episode of Season 1. Played by Paddi Edwards.
- Earl Grove Hutchinson was one of the five founders of Cabot Cove, Maine, in Jon Land's novels.

=== L ===
- Nancy Landon was a nurse who served in the Korean War alongside Frank, and Clint. She was compassionately discharged from the war in April 1952 because she was pregnant and unmarried. Nancy had sex with Steven, another flier in Franks platoon, and named her son after his father. She was played by Vera Miles.

=== M ===
- Jonathan Martin was a nighttime Deputy for the Cabot Cove police department. He was introduced in the episode If It’s Thursday, It Must Be Beverly, and was portrayed by Rick Lenz.
- Dr. Marshall MacGill is the brother of Jessica Fletcher, father of Pamela Crane (née MacGill), and debuted in the episode My Johnny Lies Over The Ocean. He is a surgeon.
- Deputy Floyd McCallum works alongside Mort Metzger, and Andy Broom, at the Cabot Cove Police Department. He is portrayed by actor Will Nye.
- Harry McGraw is an old-school private investigator who becomes friends with Jessica. The character was portrayed by Jerry Orbach and was popular enough to garner his own, short-lived spinoff series in 1987, The Law & Harry McGraw.
- Franklin McMullin was one of the five founders of Cabot Cove, Maine, in Jon Land's novels.
- Adele Metzger is Mort's first wife, who moved with him from New York to Cabot Cove. In Donald Bain's novels, Adele and Mort divorce. In Jon Land's novels Adele is still married to Mort.
- Morton Metzger, who goes simply by Mort Metzger, was a former NYPD officer who replaced Amos Tupper as Cabot Cove's sheriff, in the mistaken anticipation of living in a more peaceful place with his wife Adele. The character was played by Ron Masak.
- Maureen Metzger is Mort's second wife that appears in the companion novels written by Donald Bain.
- Wayne Metzger is the brother of Mort, and is an ex-con. He was arrested for robbing a jewelry store. After getting out of prison he went to Cabot Cove to work and turn his life around. He is played by Bruce Abbott.

=== P ===
- Joshua Peabody was a legendary American Revolutionary War hero who helped defend Cabot Cove against the British. The episode Joshua Peabody Died Here... Possibly centers around his remains possibly being found.
- Harry Pierce was a local real estate agent. In his final appearance, Pierce briefly becomes Sheriff when Amos Tupper retires but quickly loses the job when he commits and is arrested for murder. Played by John Astin, who had previously appeared in the season 1 episode "Hooray for Homicide," and later appeared in the season 11 episode "Film Flam", portraying different characters.
- Jane Portelaine is the niece of Marjorie Ainsworth, the daughter of Marjorie’s older brother. Jane would type Marjorie’s letters to Jessica.

=== R ===
- Wyatt Rackley was one of the five founders of Cabot Cove, Maine, in Jon Land's novels.
- Jed Richardson operates the local flying service in Cabot Cove, Maine. He frequently appears in Donald Bain’s novels, and makes his first appearance in Murder, She Wrote: Gin and Daggers.

=== S ===
- Archibald Semple is Marjorie Ainsworth’s British publisher.
- Eve Simpson is Cabot Cove's Real estate agent, and is played by Julie Adams.
- Loretta Spiegel is a beautician in Cabot Cove. She is played by Ruth Roman.
- Dennis Stanton played by Keith Michell is a former jewel thief turned insurance claims investigator, who always solves his cases using unusual methods, and sends a copy of the story to his friend Jessica afterwards.
- William Strayhorn is a book critic.
- George Sutherland is a police officer for Scotland Yard, and is the friend of Jessica. On occasion they've gone on dates, and have kissed, but nothing more has happened between them. Sutherland is reoccurring in Bain's novels. George debuts in the 1989 novel Gin and Daggers, the first of the Donald Bain Murder, She Wrote novels.

=== T ===
- Amos Tupper is the original Sheriff of Cabot Cove and was played by Tom Bosley. Very little is known of Amos's career; he was the Sheriff for the first four seasons and was a deputy prior to that. All that is known about him before his career with the sheriff's department is that he was a bus driver one summer. He retired as Cabot Cove's sheriff in 1988, moved to Kentucky to live with his sister, and was replaced by Sheriff Mort Metzger.

=== W ===
- John Van Webb was one of the five founders of Cabot Cove, Maine, in Jon Land's novels.
- Coreen Wilson (Note: She was not given a last name until the book series.) is Loretta's assistant at her Beauty Parlor. She is played by actress Sally Klein. Coreen's story was expanded upon in Debonair in Death, become a more confident woman in her own right throughout the story.

=== Y ===
- Gayle Yamada is a Japanese American employee who is friends with Jessica Fletcher.

=== Z ===
- Count Antonio Zara the husband of Ona Ainsworth-Zara, and the brother in law of Marjorie Ainsworth.
