= Moments (1974 film) =

1974 British film by Peter Crane

- Theatrical release poster
- Directed by: Peter Crane
- Written by: Michael Sloan
- Produced by: Peter Crane; David M. Jackson; Michael Sloan
- Starring: Keith Michell; Angharad Rees; Bill Fraser
- Cinematography: Wolfgang Suschitzky
- Edited by: Roy Watts
- Music by: John Cameron
- Production company: Pemini Organisation
- Distributed by: Columbia-Warner Distributors
- Release date: 21 November 1974
- Running time: 102 minutes
- Country: United Kingdom
- Language: English

Moments is a 1974 British drama film directed by Peter Crane and starring Keith Michell, Angharad Rees and Bill Fraser. The screenplay concerns a man who has lost his wife and daughter in a car crash who returns to a hotel where he had once enjoyed happiness.

== Cast ==
- Keith Michell as Peter Samuelson
- Angharad Rees as Chrissy
- Bill Fraser as Mr. Fleming
- Keith Bell as John
- Jeanette Sterke as Mrs. Samuelson
- Donald Hewlett as Mr. Samuelson
- Valerie Minifie as Peter's wife
- Paul Michell as young Peter
- Helena Michell as Peter's friend

== Critical reception ==
The Monthly Film Bulletin wrote: "[The film's] conceptually avant-garde characteristics come over not as Borgesian strategies interrogating the very notion of 'reality', but as slick pirouettes prevented from spinning too far outside the confines of a saccharine, woman's magazine-style story ... director Peter Crane has characters move in and out of focus, into and out of frame, like the grey figures which haunt their memories. But such stylistic metaphors fail to excuse the essentially adolescent, wish-fulfilment nature of the entire Peter-Chrissy relationship. To the apologist who argues that this is precisely the point (the tawdry, beleaguered imaginings of a desperate man), one is tempted to answer that the film's title also was a clever intimation of just how much – or how little – is left to anchor one's interest."

== Home media ==
Moments was released on the Blu-ray The Pemini Organisation (1972–1974) (Powerhouse Films, 2022) with two other films also directed by Peter Crane and written by Michael Sloan: Hunted (1972) and Assassin (1973).
