= Darkroom (TV series) =

Television series

- Genre: Horror; Fantasy; Thriller
- Directed by: Jeffrey Bloom; Peter Crane; Curtis Harrington; Paul Lynch; Rick Rosenthal
- Narrated by: James Coburn
- Opening theme: David Shire
- Country of origin: United States
- No. of episodes: 7 (16 segments)

Production
- Executive producer: Peter S. Fischer
- Production locations: Universal Studios - 100 Universal City Plaza, Universal City, California, USA
- Running time: 60 mins.
- Production company: Universal Television

Original release
- Network: ABC
- Release: November 27, 1981 – January 15, 1982

Darkroom is an American thriller anthology television series produced by Universal Television that aired on ABC from November 27, 1981, to July 8, 1982. Each 60-minute episode featured two or more stories of varying length with a new story and a new cast, but each of the episode wraparound segments was hosted by James Coburn. Among the performers who appeared on the series were Esther Rolle, Helen Hunt, Claude Akins, Richard Anderson, Lawrence Hilton-Jacobs, Carole Cook, David Carradine, Billy Crystal, Pat Buttram, Brian Dennehy, Lawrence Pressman, Dub Taylor, Rue McClanahan, Lloyd Bochner, Ronny Cox, R. G. Armstrong, Jack Carter, and June Lockhart.

== Opening narration ==
The title sequence featured a dolly-in through the corridors of a house to a safe-lighted darkroom in a crawlspace under the stairs. James Coburn's voice could be heard over this dolly-in, narrating it as follows:

You're in a house. Maybe your own... maybe one you've never seen before. You feel it. Something evil. You run, but there's no escape... nowhere to turn. You feel something beckoning you... drawing you into the terror that awaits you in the Darkroom!

As Coburn's voiceover reached the point with "no escape... nowhere to turn," the camera turned toward various walls and closed doors.

== Syndication ==
The Sci Fi Channel aired the show in the mid-1990s, including the pilot episode. USA Network also reran the show at one point in the 1980s. It was also available for streaming on NBC's official website.

== Episodes ==
No.	Title	Directed by	Written by	Original release date
1	"Closed Circuit / Stay Tuned, We'll Be Right Back"	Rick Rosenthal, Paul Lynch	Story by : Carter Scholz; Teleplay by : Alan Brennert, Simon Muntner	November 27, 1981
Aging reporter Greg Conway (Robert Webber) suspects his fellow anchor Arthur Desmond (John Randolph) has been replaced with a double. In spite of protests from his producer Linda Beckwith (Mary Frann) and network head Bill Bellamy (Richard Anderson), Greg continues to investigate and discovers that the network has replaced Desmond and several others with computer simulations, while the real people are allowed to live out their lives in luxury. Despite his initial reluctance, Conway is persuaded into allowing a simulation of him to take over his career and allow him to follow his dreams of traveling the world, getting married, and writing a novel. As he prepares to leave for Paris, Bellamy has him abducted and reveals that he must keep Conway imprisoned so that the network can sustain the illusion. Bellamy then leaves as Conway futilely begs him not to. A man (Lawrence Pressman) discovers his crystal radio is in contact with the U-Boat that sunk his father’s ship in World War II.
2	"The Bogeyman Will Get You / Uncle George"	John McPherson, Rick Rosenthal	Story by : Robert Bloch; Teleplay by : Robert Bloch, Peter S. Fischer	December 4, 1981
A teenager (Helen Hunt) is convinced by her horror movie loving sister that a recent string of murders was perpetrated by a vampire, and she begins to suspect an old acquaintance (Randy Powell) is the vampire. After the death of Uncle George, a couple (Claude Akins and June Lockhart) hire a homeless man (Dub Taylor) to impersonate him so they can get his pension check.
3	"Needlepoint / Siege of 31 August"	Paul Lynch, Peter Crane	Violet Pullbrook, Story by : Davis Grubb; Teleplay by : Peter S. Fischer	December 11, 1981
An elderly woman (Esther Rolle) uses voodoo to take revenge on a pimp (Lawrence Hilton-Jacobs) who took advantage of her granddaughter from beyond the grave. A Vietnam veteran turned farmer (Ronny Cox) buys his son a military playset, but he keeps hearing battle noises in the night and he discovers the toy soldiers are alive.
4	"A Quiet Funeral / Make Up"	Curtis Harrington	Robert Bloch / Story by : Robert R. McCammon; Teleplay by : Jeffrey Bloom	December 18, 1981
A gangster (Robert F. Lyons) attends the funeral of his partner (Eugene Roche), whom he double crossed and killed, and finds himself in for a nasty surprise. A down-on-his-luck guy (Billy Crystal) buys the makeup case of a dead actor from his widow (Signe Hasso), who claims that the makeup allowed him to literally become his characters. After discovering the makeup allows him to literally become whatever character is inscribed in the container, he decides to get back at his sleazy boss (Brian Dennehy).
5	"The Partnership / Daisies / Catnip"	John McPherson, Paul Lynch, Jeffrey Bloom	Story by : William F. Nolan; Teleplay by : Christopher Crowe, Story by : Fredric Brown; Teleplay by : Peter S. Fischer, Robert Bloch	December 25, 1981
A biker (David Carradine) is lured by an old man (Pat Buttram) to a dilapidated funhouse to meet his mysterious partner. A philandering botanist (Lloyd Bochner) develops a machine that reads the minds of daisies, which greatly interests his unaware wife (Rue McClanahan). After killing an old woman rumored to be a witch in a hit-and-run, a local troublemaker (Cyril O'Reilly) is stalked by her pet black cat.
6	"Lost in Translation / Guillotine"	Rick Rosenthal	Mary Ann Kasica & Michael Scheff, Story by : Cornell Woolrich; Teleplay by : Peter Allan Fields	January 8, 1982
An unscrupulous archaeologist (Andrew Prine) hires a translator (Michael Zand) to translate a scroll that contains a spell that gives one power over one’s enemies. In 19th century France, a man (Frank M. Bernard) sentenced to die by the guillotine and his lover (Patti D'Arbanville) decide to exploit a loophole in the law that states that should the executioner die on the day of the execution, the condemned man will go free.
7	"Exit Line / Who's There? / The Rarest of Wines"	Peter Crane, Paul Lynch	Story by : Richard Levinson & William Link; Teleplay by : Peter S. Fischer, Brian Clemens, Gerald K. Siegel	January 15, 1982
A talented young actor (Stan Shaw) and his agent (Jack Carter), both try desperately to convince an influential theater critic (Samantha Eggar) to change her negative opinion of his performance in a revamped version of Othello. A man (Grant Goodeve) tries to convince his neighbor (Michael Lembeck), who intends to murder his wife out of his belief she cheated on him, not to do the deed. Following the death of their mother, her ne'er-do-well son (Henry Polic II) is upset she has left him her house and possessions and her company to his more responsible sister (Judith Chapman). When she refuses to give him part of the company, he begins tormenting her by dissipating his share of the estate and selling the things that mean the most to her.
