= Kain (play) =

Kain is a 1966 play loosely based on the biblical story of Cain and Abel. It was the first co production between the ABC and the BBC.

== 1966 stage production ==
Kain
- Written by: Alan Poolman
- Original language: English
- Genre: Drama
- Setting: Australian Outback

Premiere
- Date premiered: 1966

In 1964 Michell returned to Australia after ten years to appear in The First 400 Years. He said "I have always wanted to act in a play by an Australian author out here." He hoped this play would be Kain which he called "a 'country modern' play, essentially Australian, and very rich in comedy – although it is a tragedy."

The play premiered in 1966 at the Yvonne Arnaud Theatre at Guild ford. .

=== Original cast ===
- Keith Michell
- Alan White
- Joanna Anin
- June Brunell
- Redmond Phillips

== 1967 TV adaptation ==
Kain
- Genre: Drama
- Written by: Alan Poolman
- Countries of origin: Australia; United Kingdom
- Original language: English

Production
- Cinematography: Frank Parnell
- Running time: 90 mins
- Production company: ABC/BBC
- Budget: $65,000

Original release
- Release: 17 April 1967 (Australia, UK)

A TV adaptation was directed by Lionel Harris and written by Alan Poolman. It was the first collaboration between the BBC and the ABC.

=== Overview ===
Brothers Kain and Rattler Sutherland live on a station in the Australian outback. The brothers clash when an Aboriginal maid gives birth to a child which both believe they have fathered.

=== Cast ===
- Keith Michell as Kain Sutherland
- Alan White as Rattler Sutherland
- J D Devlin as Old Bill a desert wanderer
- Audine Leith as Inala
- Candy Devine as Kaita
- Roger Cox as Rev. Mr Ramsay
- Teddy Plummer as King Brumly
- Michael Williams as Jock Mosquito
- Aborigines of the Warrabri Government Settlement

=== Production ===
The play was announced in March 1966. The script was commissioned by the ABC and BBC and was inspired by the Biblical story of Cain and Abel as well as the painting of Russell Drysdale.

According to Filmink "That is a big commitment for a small screen adaptation of a play that was not very well known, from a writer without much of a reputation, but the ABC and BBC probably took confidence from the prospect of pretty outback pictures, and from the presence of Michell in the lead."

It was filmed in Australia in March and April 1966: exteriors in the Northern Territory near Tennant Creek, at Warrabri and at Devil's Marbles, and interiors at the ABC's Gore Hill studios.

Lionel Harris, the director, Alan Poolman, the writer, and actors Michell, White and Devlin came from London; the rest of the cast were Australian. Props had to be brought in from Sydney. 'The days were long and hard," said Harris.

Harris said the play's theme was "in not taking those closest to you for granted – not living entirely for self. Kain thinks he has no conscience but his discovery that he has provides the play's conflict."

Production design was by Douglas Smith. The budget was reportedly $65,000. Filming took ten days. Chief cameraman was Frank Parnell who later died in a helicopter crash filming a documentary.

=== Broadcast ===
The broadcast ran for 90 minutes and aired 17 April 1967.

In the UK it was broadcast in the drama anthology series Theatre 625 as item 17 in series 4. It was thought lost, but survives as 16mm film.

=== Reception ===
The Sydney Morning Herald said it "grabbed and gripped with a force we too rarely see on the Box."

The Sunday Sydney Morning Herald TV critic called it "the event of the week" praising the "strong performances from" Michell, White and Devlin and the "superbly photographed outback scenery. The photography ran rings around most routine Hollywood westerns. In colour, it would be a masterpiece." He did say "I felt that author Alan Poolman over-wrote at times. But this is small stuff, weighed alongside the tremendous dramatic impact of the play as a whole".

The London Times said it had "great emotional power."

The Age thought it was "an essentially melodramatic play" but said "Michell's performance turned into something of breathtaking strength."

The Bulletin called it "awful... Save us from expatriate playwrights such as Alan Poolman, who marry some childish sense of what is Australian to a more thorough idea of how to write bad drama" in which Michell "was less than unimpressive, matched only by Alan White... What possessed BBC-TV and ABC TV to film it? Well, television people have some weird ideas about the Outback, there’s no other explanation. Let’s hope the British viewers took it all at face value—as only a bad joke."

The Sunday Sydney Morning Herald critic later reflected "I can't remember a TV show which has split the critics into two such violent camps" as Kain in Australia and England. "Did we all see the same thing or were there two of them?"

Filmink called it:

A truly unique, odd slice of television. It’s very theatrical, with long monologues, clearly delineated “acts”, and key characters and events which are referred to but never seen... a bold piece of drama to be sure, tackling all sorts of themes: sibling rivalry, treatment of blacks, lust, money, race, death.... there’s too many unresolved plot strands and characters, particularly Kaita; the drama feels too unfocused; it’s structurally wonky... and the Aboriginal characters allowed little screen time.
