= Helena Michell =

English actress (born 1961)

- Born: Helena Elizabeth Anne Michell; December 14, 1961 (age 64); Hampstead, London, U.K.
- Education: Bristol Old Vic Theatre School
- Occupations: Actress, producer
- Years active: 1987–2006
- Spouse: Simon David Eden (m. 1990)
- Children: 1
- Parents: Keith Michell; Jeanette Sterke

Helena Elizabeth Anne Michell (born 14 December 1961) is an English actress.

== Early life and career ==
Born and raised in Hampstead, London, Michell is the younger of two children born to actors Jeanette Sterke and Keith Michell.

She began her career as a child in the film drama Moments with her parents and her brother, Paul. But it was not until nearly a decade later that she first decided to pursue acting seriously, receiving her training at the Bristol Old Vic Theatre School. In 1986, she was then able to secure a part in 1986 in the BBC television sitcom Brush Strokes.

Early film work included parts in Merchant and Ivory's Maurice, and, alongside her father, in The Deceivers (1988).

Television parts came with the Agatha Christie’s Miss Marple episode "At Bertram's Hotel" (1987), starring Joan Hickson, and in the LWT television series Piece of Cake the following year.

Michell had numerous television roles in the 1990s, including Jeeves and Wooster and Agatha Christie's Poirot “The Theft of the Royal Ruby” (1990), a pivotal role in the television version of P. D. James' Inspector Dalgleish story Devices and Desires (1991), Sharpe's Enemy (1994) where she played the part of Sarah Dubreton, and in the television adaptation of Ruth Rendell's Heartstones in 1996. This was interspersed with stage parts in mainly children's theatre, and in 1997 she appeared with her parents in the revue, Family Album, billed as "a view of famous families in words and music by every style of writer possible from Stephen Sondheim to J. S. Bach and William Walton, and from D. H. Lawrence to Sophocles". Her last notable screen appearance was as Sheila in the 2007 Allahabad-set romantic comedy, Little Box of Sweets.

== Personal life ==
In April 1990, Michell married English playwright Simon David Eden. They have one child, a daughter, Emilia. She continues her theatre work largely through their production company, Shiny Pin Productions, and as an acting coach. She makes occasional appearances on television.
