= Jeanette Sterke =

British actress (born 1933)

- Born: 25 March 1933 (age 93); Prague, Czechoslovakia
- Occupation: Actress
- Spouse: Keith Michell (m. 1957; died 2015)
- Children: Paul Michell, Helena Michell

Jeanette Laura Sterke (born 25 March 1933) is a British actress.

Sterke's father is half-English and half-Dutch; her mother is Austrian. She was born in Prague, Czechoslovakia in 1933. Her parents emigrated to England to escape the Nazis. Sterke attended RADA, graduating in 1953. In June 1954, Sterke opened in the West End in the part of Christine in Schnitzler's Liebelei, opposite Peter Wyngarde as Fritz. She participated in a number of films, including The Prisoner (1955), Lust for Life (1956) and A Stitch in Time (1963). Sterke appeared in television series such as The New Adventures of Charlie Chan, The Invisible Man, The Avengers, and The Doctors. Her last screen credit was in the mini-series My Brother Tom (1986).

== Personal life ==
She was married to the actor Keith Michell until his death. They had a son, Paul, and a daughter Helena.

== Filmography ==
=== Film ===
Year	Title	Role	Notes
1955	The Prisoner	The Girl	
1956	Lust for Life	Kay	
1958	The Safecracker	Irene	
1959	The Nun's Story	Louise (sister of Gabrielle)	
1962	Live Now – Pay Later	Grace	
1963	A Stitch in Time	Nurse Haskell	
1963	The Double	Mary Winston	Edgar Wallace Mysteries
1974	Moments	Mrs. Samuelson	

=== Television ===
1965	The Avengers	Janice Crane	Episode "Too Many Christmas Trees
1976	The Story of David	Abigail	TV movie
