= Peter Crane (director) =

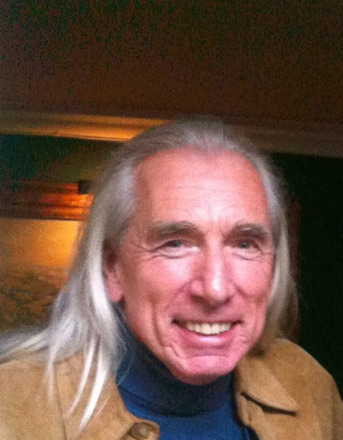
- Born: 22 December 1948 (age 77); London, England, UK
- Occupations: Film director, film producer, television director
- Years active: 1973–present

Peter Crane (born 22 December 1948, in London, England) is a British film director, film producer and television director.

He directed the feature films Hunted (1972), Assassin (1973) and Moments (1974). He also directed episodes of the American television series B. J. and the Bear, Darkroom, The Fall Guy, Knight Rider, Masquerade. Moonlighting, Murder, She Wrote, Guns of Paradise, Hunter and Kung Fu: The Legend Continues, his last directing credit.

He also produced numerous films including The Passion of Ayn Rand (1999), in which he was nominated for the Television Producer of the Year Award in Longform at the 2000 Producers Guild of America Awards.
