= Graham Dee =

British musician

- Born: Graham Davidson; 2 March 1943 (age 82); Whitechapel, East London, England
- Occupation: Singer / songwriter / guitar player / producer from London.
- Years active: 1967–present
- Website: www.graham-dee.com

Graham Dee (born Graham Davidson, 2 March 1943) is an English musician.

== Early life ==
Graham Dee was born in Whitechapel, East London, England.

Dee has lived his life with a neuromuscular disorder that results in a series of ticks, twitches, and spasms which has created a weakness in his neck.

He attended boarding school in Hertfordshire, where he started playing guitar after hearing Lonnie Donegan's "Rock Island Line". He then went on to a college for the disabled where he qualified in gardening but kept up his guitar playing, forming an ad hoc group and playing for scrumpy in the cider pubs of Leatherhead.

== Career ==
While working as a gardener, Dee started playing bass semi-pro with a band called The Planets and then returned to the guitar and got a gig backing crooner Steve Arlen. Eventually, he joined the Laurie Jay Combo who backed the likes of Gary US Bonds, Memphis Slim, John Lee Hooker and Kenny Lynch and his band appeared in Michael Winner's 1964 The System, which starred Oliver Reed.

Dee formed a group called The Quotations and ended up on tour with The Animals and Tommy Tucker. He later played in a band called Bobcats, who were the house band at the Scotch of St James club.

Dee was a session musician in the 1960s, working alongside the likes of future Led Zeppelin members Jimmy Page and John Paul Jones.

In 1968, Dee wrote the single "Phoebe's Flower Shoppe" for The Cortinas. He started gaining a reputation as a songwriter, producer and musician. Dee has co-writing credits on John Bromley's "Weatherman" and novelty songs like "My Daddie is a Baddie".

In 1972 he provided the music for the film Hunted.

Whilst gigging at The Alibi in 1997, Dee was approached by BBC Look East to perform for Children in Need on TV. He had previously composed a Christmas song with Sara Blumenstein in New York called "I Remember Christmas" and decided to record the song for the children's charity. He joined forces with the Norwich Cathedral Choristers and The Salvation Army and released a single with all profits going to Children in Need.

In 2000 Dee released a 3-track CD titled The Bottom Line on the Sugabeat/Elkin Music label.

In 2004, Big Beat Records released You Gotta Believe It's... Sharon Tandy. The tracks "Daughter of the Sun", "The Way She Looks at You", "He'll Hurt Me", "Somebody Speaks Your Name", and "Two Can Make It Together" were co-written by Dee and lyricist Brian Potter. The album also included "Love Is Not A Simple Affair", co-written by Dee and John Bromley.

Some of Dee's writing and production work has been reissued by record label Acid Jazz. The Graham Dee Connection: The 60s Collection was released in 2011. The EP Graham Dee’s Hitsville London followed in 2012.

In 2014, Graham announced on his Facebook page that his latest album, The Thirteenth Man, would be released by Tin-Kan Records.

He lives in the Dorset village, Bere Regis, where he often plays gigs in the local pub.
