= Captain Beaky and His Band =

British poetry albums

Captain Beaky & His Band (Not Forgetting Hissing Sid!!!), commonly shortened to Captain Beaky & His Band or Captain Beaky, is the title of two albums (volumes 1 and 2) of poetry by Jeremy Lloyd set to music by Jim Parker and recited by various British celebrities. The albums generated two books of poetry, BBC television shows, a West End musical, a pantomime (Captain Beaky and His Musical Christmas performed by Twiggy, Eleanor Bron, Keith Michell and Jeremy Lloyd at the Apollo Victoria Theatre, London, in December 1981), performances by the National Youth Ballet of Great Britain and a gala in aid of UNICEF performed by Roger Moore, Joanna Lumley, Jeremy Lloyd and the National Youth Ballet at the Royal Albert Hall, London, in December 2011. The first album was released on vinyl in 1977 and the second in 1980. Both were re-released on compact disc in 2002.

Captain Beaky's band consist of Timid Toad, Reckless Rat, Artful Owl and Batty Bat. The title track from the first album, "Captain Beaky", was released as a 7 inch single with "Wilfred the Weasel" and "Blanche" on the B-side by Polydor in 1980; it reached Number 5 in the UK Singles Chart and number 36 in Australia. The song, sung by Keith Michell, informs us that:

The bravest animals in the land are Captain Beaky and his band
That's Timid Toad, Reckless Rat, Artful Owl and Batty Bat
They march through the woodlands singing songs
That tell how they have righted wrongs.

According to Jonathan Rowlands, the producer of both albums, when BBC Radio 1 disc jockey Noel Edmonds heard colleague Tony Blackburn play the record, "he grabbed it from his turntable, played it just once, and the result was that an atomic scientist who was on secondment with the British Museum, upon hearing the show and recognising that Captain Beaky's bete-noir [sic] Hissing Sid was not all that bad, wrote in [to the BBC] proclaiming "Hissing Sid Is Innocent Okay!".

The character of Hissing Sid is a snake, mentioned in both "Captain Beaky" on the first album and "The Trial of Hissing Sid" on the second. The slogan "Hissing Sid is Innocent!" became a popular catch phrase, appearing everywhere including as a graffito on walls (sometimes as a modification for earlier "George Davis is Innocent!" graffiti, especially after Davis' second conviction), on badges, and on car stickers.

== Track listings ==
=== Volume I ===
First released on vinyl in 1977. Re-released as a compact disc (EAN 5032796014621) in 2002.

1. "Captain Beaky", Keith Michell
2. "Harold the Frog", Harry Secombe
3. "Jacques, a Penniless French Mouse", Peter Sellers
4. "Nathaniel Gnat", Twiggy
5. "Wilfred the Weasel", Keith Michell
6. "Dilys the Dachshund", Harry Secombe
7. "The Snail", Twiggy
8. "Blanche", Keith Michell
9. "My Best Friend", Jeremy Lloyd
10. "The Ginger Cat", Keith Michell
11. "Desmond the Duck", Harry Secombe
12. "Ronald the Rat", Twiggy
13. "The Haggis Season", Peter Sellers
14. "Dennis the Dormouse", Twiggy
15. "Herbert the Hedgehog", Harry Secombe
16. "Doreen the Duckling", The King's Singers (CD edition only)
17. Overture "The Orchestra"

=== Volume II ===
First released on vinyl in 1980. Re-released as a compact disc (EAN 5032796014720) in 2002.

1. "The Trial of Hissing Sid!!!", Keith Michell
2. "Jock the Flea", Jeremy Lloyd
3. "Candle Tango", Keith Michell
4. "Fred and Marguerite", Petula Clark
5. "Helen the Hippo", Penelope Keith
6. "Mandy the Mouse", Noel Edmonds
7. "Fanshaw the Fly", Keith Michell
8. "Stanley the Stork", Peter Skellern
9. "Kenny the Koala", Harry Secombe
10. "Daddy Long Legs", Peter Skellern (with footnotes by Lionel Blair)
11. "Browser Long", Penelope Keith
12. "Enrico the Canary", Harry Secombe (accompanied by Midori Nishiura)
13. "Teddy's Tea Time", Jeremy Lloyd
14. "Wendell the Worm", The King's Singers
15. "The Bumble Bee", Petula Clark
16. "Dotty the Cuckoo", Noel Edmonds
17. "Camille", Matthew Vine
18. "Captain Beaky's Christmas Pantomime", Keith Michell
19. "Captain Beaky's Christmas Carol", Matthew Vine

The original vinyl and cassette editions differ slightly from this track listing, omitting some tracks but including the additional "Doreen the Duckling", The King's Singers and with "Teddy's Tea Time" titled "Nearly Four".

=== Captain Beaky and His Band ===
Most of Volume I and Volume II, slightly re-ordered, issued as a cassette by Polydor.

1. "Captain Beaky", Keith Michell
2. "Harold the Frog", Harry Secombe
3. "Jacques, a Penniless French Mouse", Peter Sellers
4. "Desmond the Duck", Harry Secombe
5. "Wilfred the Weasel", Keith Michell
6. "Dilys the Dachshund", Harry Secombe
7. "The Snail", Twiggy
8. "Blanche", Keith Michell
9. "My Best Friend", Jeremy Lloyd
10. "The Ginger Cat", Keith Michell
11. "Nathaniel Gnat", Twiggy
12. "Ronald the Rat", Twiggy
13. "The Haggis Season", Peter Sellers
14. "Dennis the Dormouse", Twiggy
15. "Herbert the Hedgehog", Harry Secombe
16. Overture "The Orchestra"
17. "Jock the Flea", Jeremy Lloyd
18. "Candle Tango", Keith Michell
19. "Fred and Marguerite", Petula Clark
20. "Doreen the Duckling", The King's Singers
21. "Helen the Hippo", Penelope Keith
22. "The Trial of Hissing Sid!!!", Keith Michell
23. "Mandy the Mouse", Noel Edmonds
24. "Fanshaw the Fly", Keith Michell
25. "Kenny the Koala", Harry Secombe
26. "Daddy Long Legs", Peter Skellern (with footnotes by Lionel Blair)
27. "Browser Long", Penelope Keith
28. "Enrico the Canary", Harry Secombe (accompanied by Midori Nishiura)
29. "Teddy's Tea Time", Jeremy Lloyd
30. "Wendell the Worm", The King's Singers
31. "The Bumble Bee", Petula Clark
32. "Dotty the Cuckoo", Noel Edmonds
33. "Camille", Matthew Vine
34. "Captain Beaky's Christmas Pantomime", Keith Michell

== Books ==
- Jeremy Lloyd (October 1980). Captain Beaky and the Haunted Wood. Chappell. ISBN 0-903443-43-0.
- Jeremy Lloyd (October 1980). Captain Beaky and the Search for Hissing Sid. Chappell. ISBN 0-903443-44-9.
- Jeremy Lloyd (1980). Captain Beaky Hissing Sid and the Swimming Lesson. Chappell. ISBN 0-903443-42-2.
- Jeremy Lloyd (1980). Captain Beaky The Trial of Hissing Sid. Chappell. ISBN 0-903443-41-4.
- Jeremy Lloyd (April 1982). Captain Beaky. Sparrow Books. ISBN 0-09-928110-4. a collection of 28 poems illustrated by Keith Michell
- The Archbishop of Canterbury (Foreword), Jeremy Lloyd, Graham Percy (Illustrator) (1984). The Woodland Gospels According to Captain Beaky and His Band. Faber and Faber Ltd. ISBN 0-571-13270-7. a retelling of parts of the story of Jesus set in a woodland
