= Assassin (1973 film) =

1973 British film by Peter Crane

- Theatrical release poster
- Directed by: Peter Crane
- Written by: Michael Sloan
- Produced by: Peter Crane; David M. Jackson
- Starring: Ian Hendry; Edward Judd; Frank Windsor; Ray Brooks
- Cinematography: Brian Jonson
- Edited by: Roy Watts
- Music by: Zack Laurence
- Release date: November 1973
- Running time: 83 minutes
- Country: United Kingdom
- Language: English

Assassin is a 1973 British thriller film directed by Peter Crane and starring Ian Hendry, Edward Judd and Frank Windsor. It was written by Michael Sloan.

== Plot ==
MI5 intends to liquidate Ministry of Defence official John Stacy, suspected of leaking secrets. Rather than using their own personnel they hire a professional hitman. The assassin is a disillusioned and troubled man, following his accidental killing of a bystander during a previous job. When the time comes for him to kill Stacy, at the wedding of his colleague Craig, MI5 learn that Stacey is not guilty, but it is too late to contact the assassin and call him off, so two MI5 officers are sent to stop him. Before they can, the assassin is run over by a car. However, unknown to MI5, the assassin has a back-up man who shoots Stacy. It transpires that the real spy was Craig.

== Cast ==
- Ian Hendry as The Assassin
- Edward Judd as MI5 Control
- Frank Windsor as John Stacy
- Ray Brooks as Edward Craig
- John Hart Dyke as Janik
- Verna Harvey as the girl
- Mike Pratt as Matthew
- Frank Duncan as Luke
- Mike Shannon as alcoholic
- Paul Whitsun-Jones as drunk man
- Molly Weir as drunk woman
- Andrew Lodge as back-up man
- Avril Fenton as barmaid
- Caroline John as Ann
- Celia Imrie as Stacy's secretary
- Peter Hawkins as passport officer

== Critical reception ==
The Monthly Film Bulletin wrote: "Assassin is distinguished chiefly by the amount of heavy, jazzy style Peter Crane manages to cram into it: pointless overhead shots, angles, distortions, even a heartbeat on the soundtrack to herald the nightmare which (naturally) haunts the disillusioned killer. A sound performance by Ian Hendry almost makes one forgive the painful contrivance with which excuses are found to stress his angst-ridden solitude, and the equally painful dreariness with which he is made to moon around until he meets that cliché of clichés, the girl in the pub who is even lonelier than he."

The Radio Times Guide to Films gave the film 2/5 stars, writing: "Without the extraneous style and a couple of the more extended scenes, this might have made a decent half-hour TV thriller. Instead, director Peter Crane piles on the flashy visuals in an attempt to turn a humdrum espionage caper into a meaningful tract on the state's dispassionate sanctioning of murder and the isolation of the professional killer. Amid the directorial pyrotechnics, however, lan Hendry is highly effective."

Leslie Halliwell said: "Old hat espionage melodrama, topheavy with artiness which makes it look like an endless TV commercial."

== Soundtrack ==
The soundtrack was by Zack Lawrence. A 7-inch 4-track EP Assassin: The Pemini Organisation Presents The Original Soundtrack From The Film, was released in 1973.

== Home media ==
Assassin was released on the Blu-ray The Pemini Organisation (1972–1974) (Powerhouse Films, 2022) with two other films also directed by Peter Crane and written by Michael Sloan: Hunted (1972) and Moments (1974).
