= Keith Michell =

Australian-British actor (1926–2015)

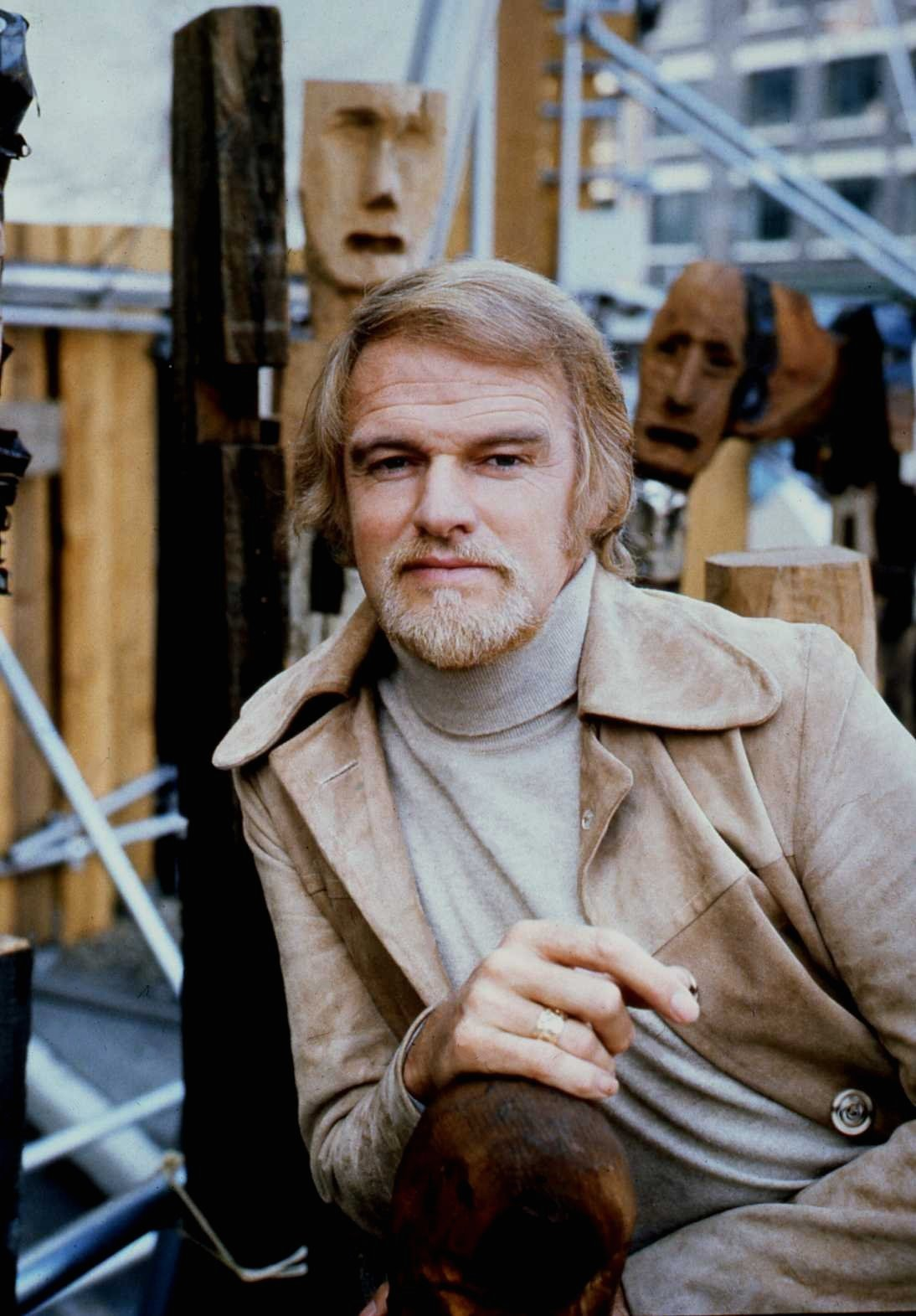
- Michell in 1973
- Born: Keith Joseph Michell; 1 December 1926; Adelaide, South Australia
- Died: 20 November 2015 (aged 88); Hampstead, London, England, UK
- Occupation: Actor
- Years active: 1947–2010
- Spouse: Jeanette Sterke (m. 1957–2015)
- Children: Paul and Helena
- Awards: Best Television Actor; 1970 The Six Wives of Henry VIII

Keith Joseph Michell (1 December 1926 – 20 November 2015) was an Australian actor who worked primarily in the United Kingdom, and was best known for his television and film portrayals of King Henry VIII. He appeared extensively in Shakespeare and other classics and musicals in Britain, and was also in several Broadway productions. He was an artistic director of the Chichester Festival Theatre in the 1970s and later had a recurring role on Murder, She Wrote as the charming thief Dennis Stanton. He was also known for illustrating a collection of Jeremy Lloyd's poems Captain Beaky, and singing the title song from the associated album.

Michell was nominated for the BAFTA Award for Most Promising Newcomer to Film for his performance as Harry Bell in True as a Turtle (1957). He later won the BAFTA Award for Best Actor for playing Henry VIII in The Six Wives of Henry VIII (1970).

== Early life ==
Michell was born in Adelaide, and brought up in Warnertown, near Port Pirie. His parents were Joseph, a cabinet-maker, and Alice (née Aslat). Educated at Port Pirie High School, Adelaide Teachers' College and Adelaide University, he began his career as an art teacher and made his professional acting debut in 1947 in the comedy Lover's Leap, by Bill Daily, at Adelaide's Playbox Theatre. He then worked in radio for ABC in Adelaide. In 1949, he moved to Britain to study at the Old Vic Theatre School.

== Career ==
Michell joined the Young Vic theatre company and made his first appearance in London by 1951. An early role there was Bassanio in The Merchant of Venice. His first London musical was And So to Bed, playing King Charles II. With the Shakespeare Memorial Theatre Company in 1952–1953, he toured in Australia. Then, at Stratford-upon-Avon, he appeared in a series of Shakespeare plays: The Taming of the Shrew, A Midsummer Night's Dream, Troilus and Cressida, and Romeo and Juliet. In 1956, on television, he played Henry Higgins in Pygmalion by Bernard Shaw and, the same year, at the Royal Court Theatre, he starred in the title role in Ronald Duncan's Don Juan and in several Old Vic Company productions as Benedick in Much Ado About Nothing, Proteus in The Two Gentlemen of Verona, Antony in Antony and Cleopatra and Aaron in Titus Andronicus.

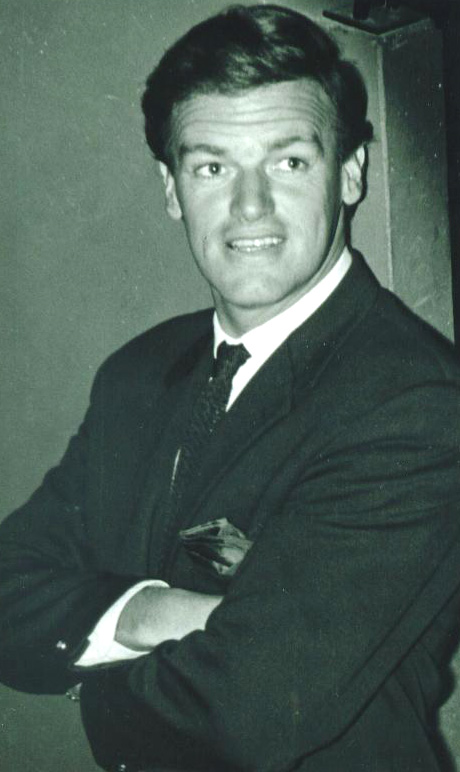
Michell at Chichester Festival Theatre in 1962

In 1958, he played Nestor-Le-Fripe in the musical Irma La Douce, also starring in the role with the National Theatre in Washington, DC, and on Broadway in 1960–1961. At the newly opened Chichester Festival Theatre, in 1962, he played Don John in The Chances and then Ithocles in The Broken Heart, and in British television adaptations, he starred as Heathcliff in Wuthering Heights (1962) and in a series of Roman plays titled The Spread of the Eagle, he played Mark Antony (1963). Michell later sang in a series of television specials written for him.

Also on Broadway, he played the Count in The Rehearsal by Jean Anouilh (1963). In 1964 in London, he starred as Robert Browning in the musical Robert and Elizabeth, opposite Australian soprano June Bronhill. Michell played the dual role of Miguel de Cervantes and his fictional creation Don Quixote in the musical Man of La Mancha, first starring in the original London production of the musical and then on Broadway. He also starred as Abelard in the Broadway play Abelard and Heloise with Diana Rigg by Ronald Millar (1971) and as Georges in La Cage aux Folles in the 1980s.

On stage, in film, and on television, he appeared several times as King Henry VIII, including in the BBC series The Six Wives of Henry VIII in 1970 and the similar film Henry VIII and His Six Wives (1972). For this he won an Emmy. The actual statuette was given to Julie Andrews, who presented him with it when he appeared on her show for the 2nd time. He reprised the role in a 1996 television series adaptation of The Prince and the Pauper.

In the late 1950s Michell was under contract to the Rank Organisation who gave him roles in films such as True as a Turtle, The Gentleman and the Gypsy and Dangerous Exile.

Other films included The Hellfire Club (1961), Seven Seas to Calais (1962) and The Executioner (1970). He appeared in a series of Gilbert and Sullivan TV adaptations by Brent Walker. On American television from 1988 to 1993, Michell made appearances on the mystery series Murder, She Wrote, playing Dennis Stanton, a former jewel thief turned insurance claims investigator.

He was the artistic director of the Chichester Festival Theatre from 1974 to 1977, appearing in many of their productions, including as the Director in Tonight We Improvise, as the title character in Oedipus Tyrannus, and in A Month in the Country and The Confederacy by Vanbrugh.

As well as acting, Michell wrote the musical Pete McGynty and the Dreamtime, an Australian rendering of Henrik Ibsen's Peer Gynt, the performance of which used Michell's own paintings as backdrops. He enjoyed a recording career as a soloist, with one of his singles, I'll Give You the Earth, which he co-wrote, reaching No. 30 in the UK charts in 1971, boosted by his high profile on television at the time. He also illustrated a limited edition run of William Shakespeare's sonnets, for which he did the calligraphy; and wrote and illustrated a number of macrobiotic cookbooks. Michell himself was a proponent of the macrobiotic diet and philosophy. Michell illustrated Captain Beaky, a collection of Jeremy Lloyd's poems. The Captain Beaky character enjoyed success in the UK in the early 1980s, among both children and adults. The song "Captain Beaky", sung by Michell, peaked at No. 5 and No. 36 in the UK and Australia respectively in 1980.

== Personal life and death ==
He married the actress Jeanette Sterke in 1957. They had a son, Paul who was the lead singer of 80s band the Roaring Boys, and a daughter, Helena, who appeared in the films Prick Up Your Ears and Maurice.

Michell died in Hampstead, London, eleven days before his 89th birthday.

== Filmography ==
- True as a Turtle (1957) – Harry Bell
- Dangerous Exile (1957) – Colonel St. Gerard
- The Gypsy and the Gentleman (1958) – Sir Paul Deverill
- Dow Hour of Great Mysteries (1960, TV series) – Baron Von Ragastein
- The Hellfire Club (1961) – Jason Caldwell
- All Night Long (1962) – Cass Michaels
- Wuthering Heights (1962, TV movie) – Heathcliff
- Dominatore dei sette mari, Il (1962) – Malcolm Marsh
- The Shifting Heart (1962) (TV)
- The Spread of the Eagle (1963, TV mini-series) – Marc Antony
- The Bergonzi Hand (1963, TV series) – Gabriel Cordier
- Soldier in Love (1967, TV movie) – John Churchill
- Hallmark Hall of Fame (1967, TV movie) – John Churchill
- Kain (1967, TV play)
- Thirty-Minute Theatre (1968, TV series) – Martin
- Prudence and the Pill (1968) – Dr. Alan Hewitt
- House of Cards (1968) – Général Sébastien Henri René de Villemont / Dr Morillon
- Play of the Month (1968–1969, TV series) – Caliban
- The Six Wives of Henry VIII (1970, TV mini-series) – King Henry VIII
- The Executioner (1970) – Adam Booth
- Wiltons (1970, TV series) – Music Hall Performer
- The Morecambe and Wise Show (1971, TV series) – Himself / Captain Tony Snug-Fitting
- Henry VIII and His Six Wives (1972) – King Henry VIII
- Keith Michell at Her Majesty's Show of the Week (1972, TV series) – Himself
- The Julie Andrews Hour (1972–1973, two episodes, guest)
- The Story of Jacob and Joseph (1974, TV movie) – Jacob
- Moments (1974) – Peter Samuelson
- The Story of David (1976, TV movie) – Older David
- Julius Caesar (1979, TV movie) – Marcus Antonius
- The Tenth Month (1979, TV movie) – Matthew Poole
- The Day Christ Died (1980, TV movie) – Pontius Pilate
- Grendel Grendel Grendel (1981) – The Shaper (voice)
- The Pirates of Penzance (1982, TV movie) – Major General Stanley
- The Gondoliers (1982, TV movie) – Don Alhambra del Bolero
- Ruddigore (1982, TV movie) – Robin Oakapple / Sir Ruthven Murgatroyd
- Memorial Day (1983, TV movie) – Marsh
- Cross Creek (1983) – Preston Turner
- The Miracle (1985, TV movie)
- My Brother Tom (1986, TV mini-series) – Edward Quayle
- Captain James Cook (1986, TV TV mini-series) – Captain James Cook
- The Deceivers (1988) – Colonel Wilson
- Murder, She Wrote (1988–1993, TV series) – Dennis Stanton (recurring role)
- The Prince and the Pauper (1996, TV mini-series) – King Henry VIII
- Love/Loss (2010) – Joe
