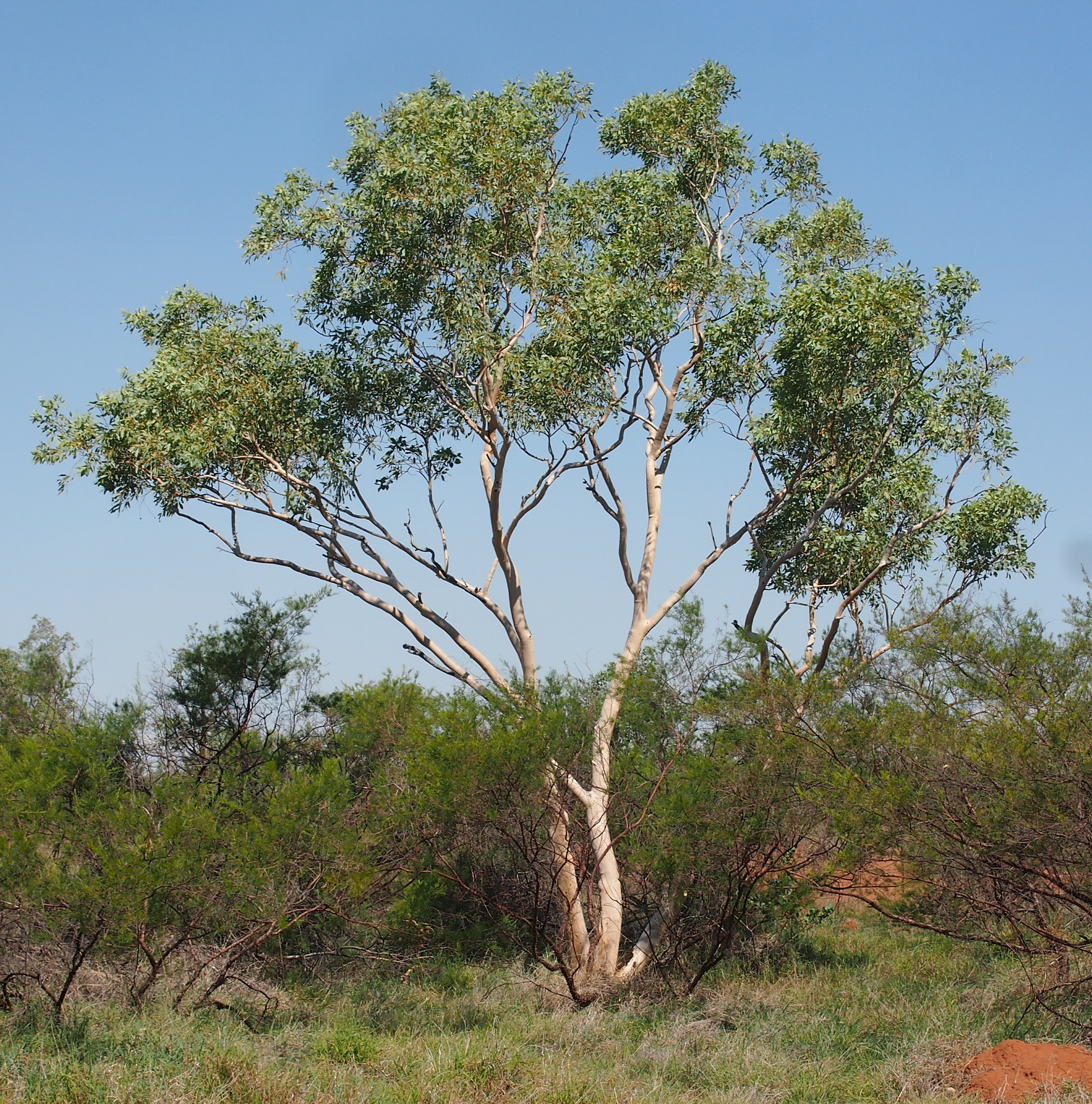

Scientific classification
- Kingdom: Plantae
- Clade: Tracheophytes
- Clade: Angiosperms
- Clade: Eudicots
- Clade: Rosids
- Order: Myrtales
- Family: Myrtaceae
- Genus: Eucalyptus
- Species: E. victrix

Binomial name
- Eucalyptus victrix L.A.S.Johnson & K.D.Hill
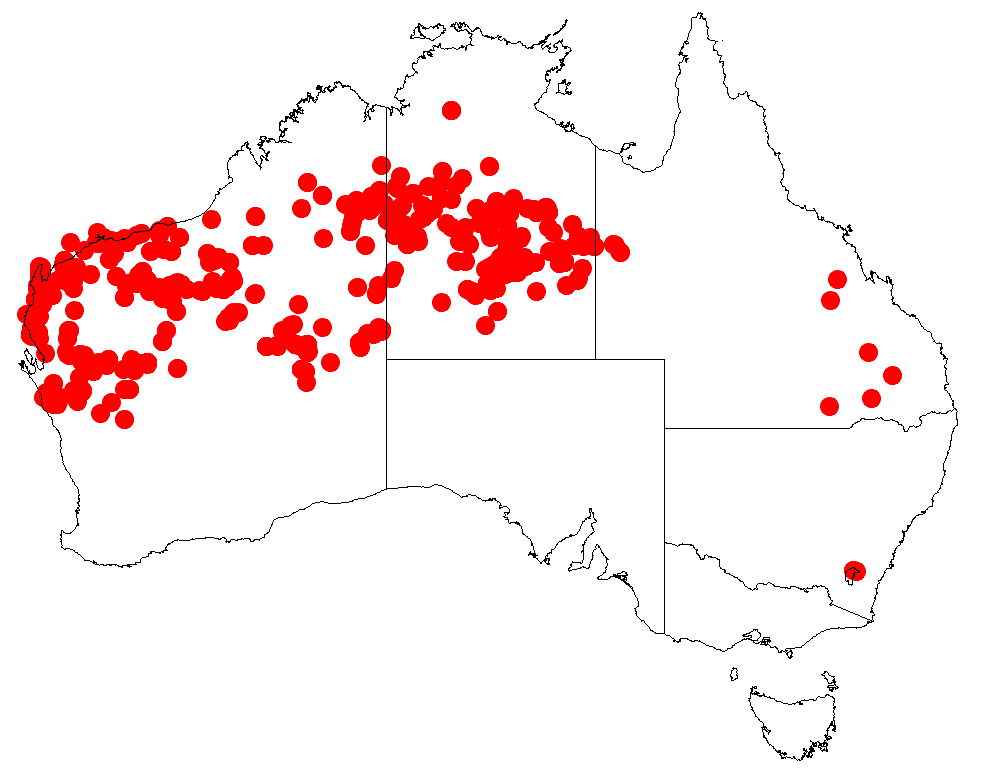
- Occurrence data from Australasian Virtual Herbarium

Synonyms
- Eucalyptus coolabah var. rhodoclada Blakely

= Eucalyptus victrix =

Smooth-barked coolibah

Species of eucalyptus

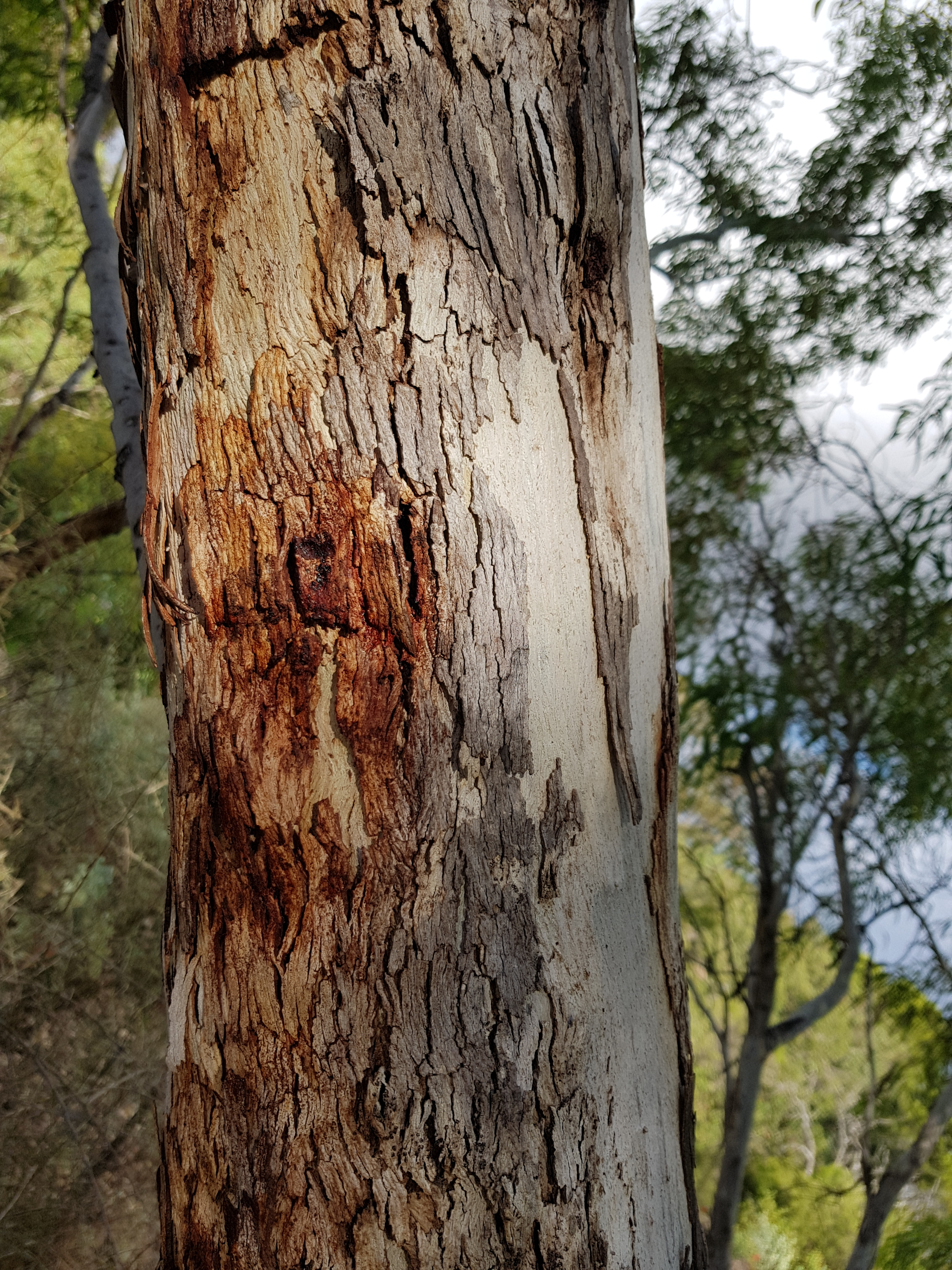
Bark of Eucalyptus victrix.

Eucalyptus victrix, commonly known as the smooth-barked coolibah, western coolibah or little ghost gum, is a species of small tree that is endemic to Australia. It has smooth bark, lance-shaped to curved adult leaves, flower buds in groups of seven, creamy white flowers and conical fruit.

== Description ==
Eucalyptus victrix is a spreading tree that typically grows to a height of 1–12 m (3 ft 3 in – 39 ft 4 in) but can reach as high as 22 m (72 ft) and forms a lignotuber. It has smooth bark often with a box-type stocking of rougher bark at the base to a height of 1 m (3 ft 3 in). Young plants and coppice regrowth have broadly lance-shaped leaves that are 80–125 mm (3.1–4.9 in) long and 30–45 mm (1.2–1.8 in) wide. Adult leaves are the same shade of green on both sides, lance-shaped to curved, 90–150 mm (3.5–5.9 in) long and 8–25 mm (0.31–0.98 in) wide, tapering to a petiole 7–23 mm (0.28–0.91 in) long. The flower buds are arranged on the ends of branchlets in groups of seven on a branched peduncle 1–2 mm (0.039–0.079 in)long, the individual buds on pedicels 1–3 mm (0.039–0.118 in) long. Mature buds are oval, 3–5 mm (0.12–0.20 in) long and 2–3 mm (0.079–0.118 in) wide with a conical to rounded operculum. Flowering occurs between November and March and the flowers are creamy white. The fruit is a woody conical capsule 2–5 mm (0.079–0.197 in) long and 3–6 mm (0.12–0.24 in) wide with the valves near rim level or protruding.

== Taxonomy and naming ==
Eucalyptus victrix was first formally described in 1994 by Lawrie Johnson and Ken Hill in the journal Telopea from specimens collected near the Tea Tree Well roadhouse near the Stuart Highway in the Northern Territory. The specific epithet (victrix) is the feminine form of the Latin word victor, referring to this species' success in a harsh climate.

== Distribution ==
The smooth-barked coolibah is found on flats and flood plains in the Mid West, Pilbara, Kimberley and north eastern Goldfields-Esperance regions of Western Australia where it grows in sandy-loamy or clay-sand soils. It is also found through much of the Northern Territory and in far western Queensland.

== Uses ==
=== Traditional uses ===
Indigenous Australians traditionally used the tree for many purposes including as a food and water source, weapons, implements, firewood, shade, shelter and for cultural purposes. The Arrente peoples know the tree as ankerre, the Jaru as gurndad and the Pitjantjatjara as ankara.

=== Use in horticulture ===
This eucalypt is not commonly cultivated but is suitable as a garden ornamental plant which tolerates full sun and is suited to most soil types that are free-draining. It does not usually require pruning except to shape and form. It can be grown from seed and is tolerant to most diseases and pests. The tree is drought and wind tolerant.

== See also ==
- List of Eucalyptus species
