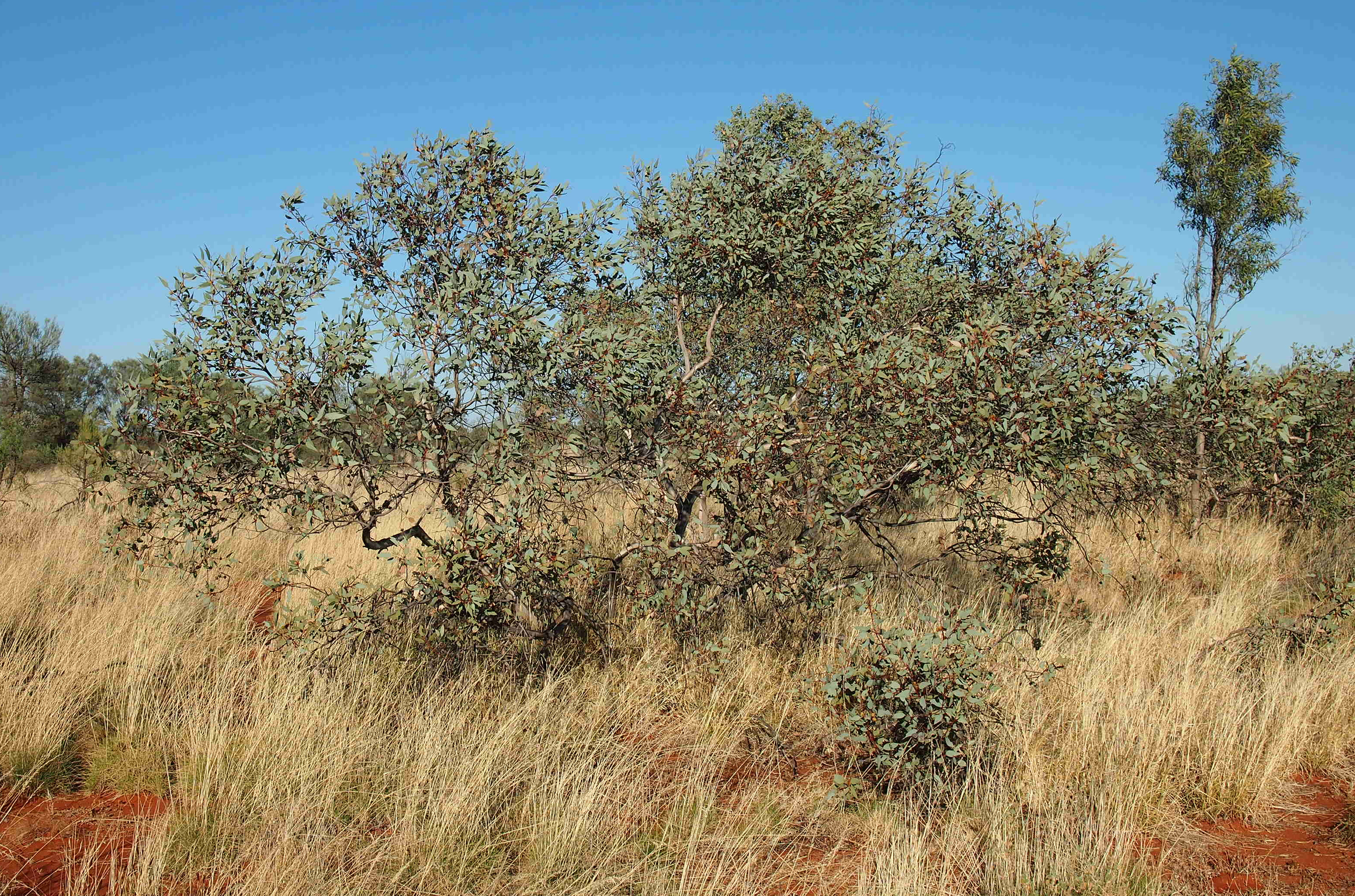

Scientific classification
- Kingdom: Plantae
- Clade: Embryophytes
- Clade: Tracheophytes
- Clade: Spermatophytes
- Clade: Angiosperms
- Clade: Eudicots
- Clade: Rosids
- Order: Myrtales
- Family: Myrtaceae
- Genus: Eucalyptus
- Species: E. pachyphylla

Binomial name
- Eucalyptus pachyphylla F.Muell.

= Eucalyptus pachyphylla =

Thick-leaved mallee

Species of eucalyptus

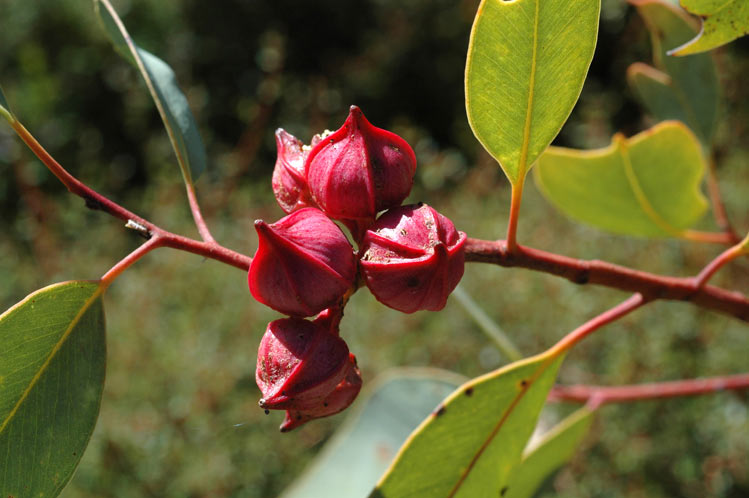
Flower buds

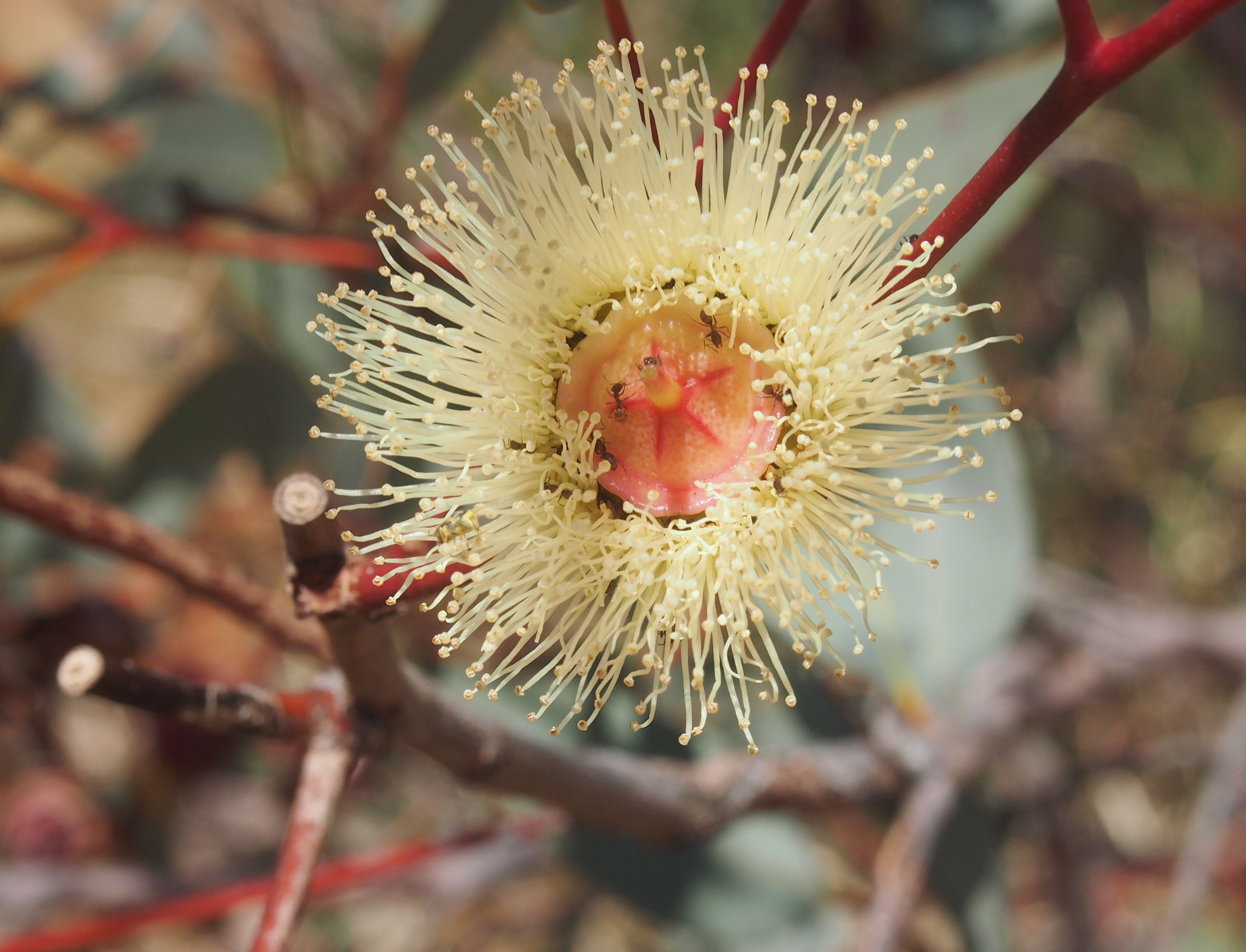
Flower

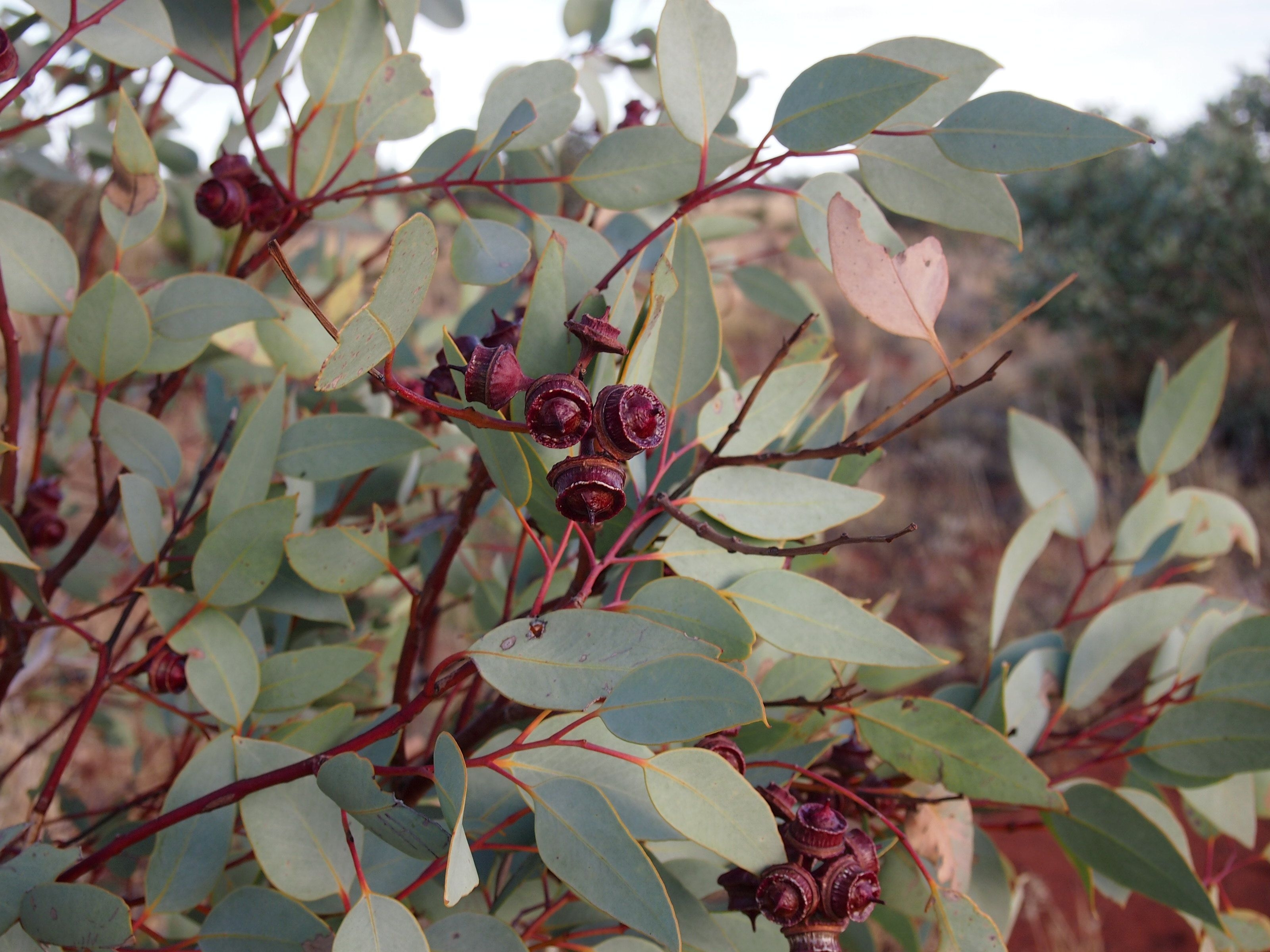
Fruit

Eucalyptus pachyphylla, commonly known as thick-leaved mallee or the red-budded mallee, is a species of mallee that is native to inland Australia. It has smooth bark, egg-shaped to lance-shaped adult leaves, flower buds in groups of three with five prominent ribs on each bud, and broad, shallow, conical to hemispherical fruit.

== Description ==
Eucalyptus pachyphylla is a mallee that typically grows to a height of 1.5–5 m (4 ft 11 in – 16 ft 5 in), sometimes as high as 7 m (23 ft), and forms a lignotuber. It has a smooth textured white, grey, grey brown, grey-pink or brown bark that is sheds in loose ribbons at the base. Young plants and coppice regrowth have coarse, dull greyish green, egg-shaped to lance-shaped leaves that are up to 160 mm (6.3 in) long and 50 mm (2.0 in) wide. Adult leaves are the same shade of green on both sides, thick, egg-shaped to lance-shaped, 60–115 mm (2.4–4.5 in) long and 20–45 mm (0.79–1.77 in) wide, on a petiole 12–35 mm (0.47–1.38 in) long.

The flower buds are arranged in leaf axils in groups of three on an unbranched peduncle 4–20 mm (0.16–0.79 in) long, the individual buds on pedicels 3–10 mm (0.12–0.39 in) long. Mature buds are oval, 18–32 mm (0.71–1.26 in) long and 13–25 mm (0.51–0.98 in) wide, with five prominent, thin ribs along the sides and a beaked operculum 13–25 mm (0.51–0.98 in) long. The buds are pinkish near flowering time. Flowering occurs between April and July and the flowers are creamy yellow. The fruit is a woody, broad, shallow conical to hemispherical capsule 6–15 mm (0.24–0.59 in) long and 16–35 mm (0.63–1.38 in) wide including the ribs, and the valves protrude above the rim of the fruit.

== Taxonomy ==
Eucalyptus pachyphylla was first formally described in 1859 by Ferdinand von Mueller in the Journal of the Proceedings of the Linnean Society, Botany. The specific epithet (pachyphylla) is from ancient Greek meaning "thick-leaved". The name of his species is often misapplied to Eucalyptus alatissima.

== Distribution and habitat ==
Thick-leaved mallee is often found on sand dunes and sand plains as well as rocky slopes and grows in red sandy soils. In Western Australia it is found throughout much of the Pilbara and Goldfields-Esperance regions. It is also found in the Northern Territory, South Australia and Queensland.

== Use in horticulture ==
It is sold commercially and can be used as an ornamental plant, informal screen or windbreak and will attract birds. It is best grown in a position in full sun. It can tolerate drought and moderate frosts.

== See also ==
- List of Eucalyptus species
