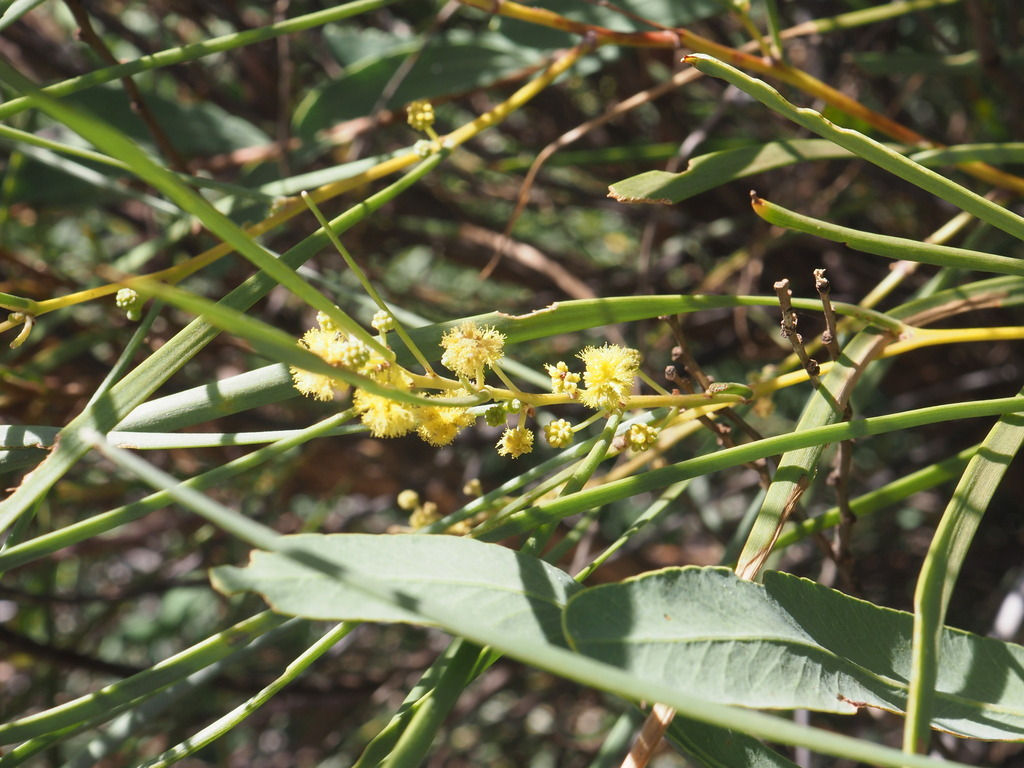
- On Barrow Island

Scientific classification
- Kingdom: Plantae
- Clade: Tracheophytes
- Clade: Angiosperms
- Clade: Eudicots
- Clade: Rosids
- Order: Fabales
- Family: Fabaceae
- Subfamily: Caesalpinioideae
- Clade: Mimosoid clade
- Genus: Acacia
- Species: A. coriacea

Binomial name
- Acacia coriacea DC.

Synonyms
- Racosperma coriaceum (DC.) Pedley

= Acacia coriacea =

Desert oak

Species of legume

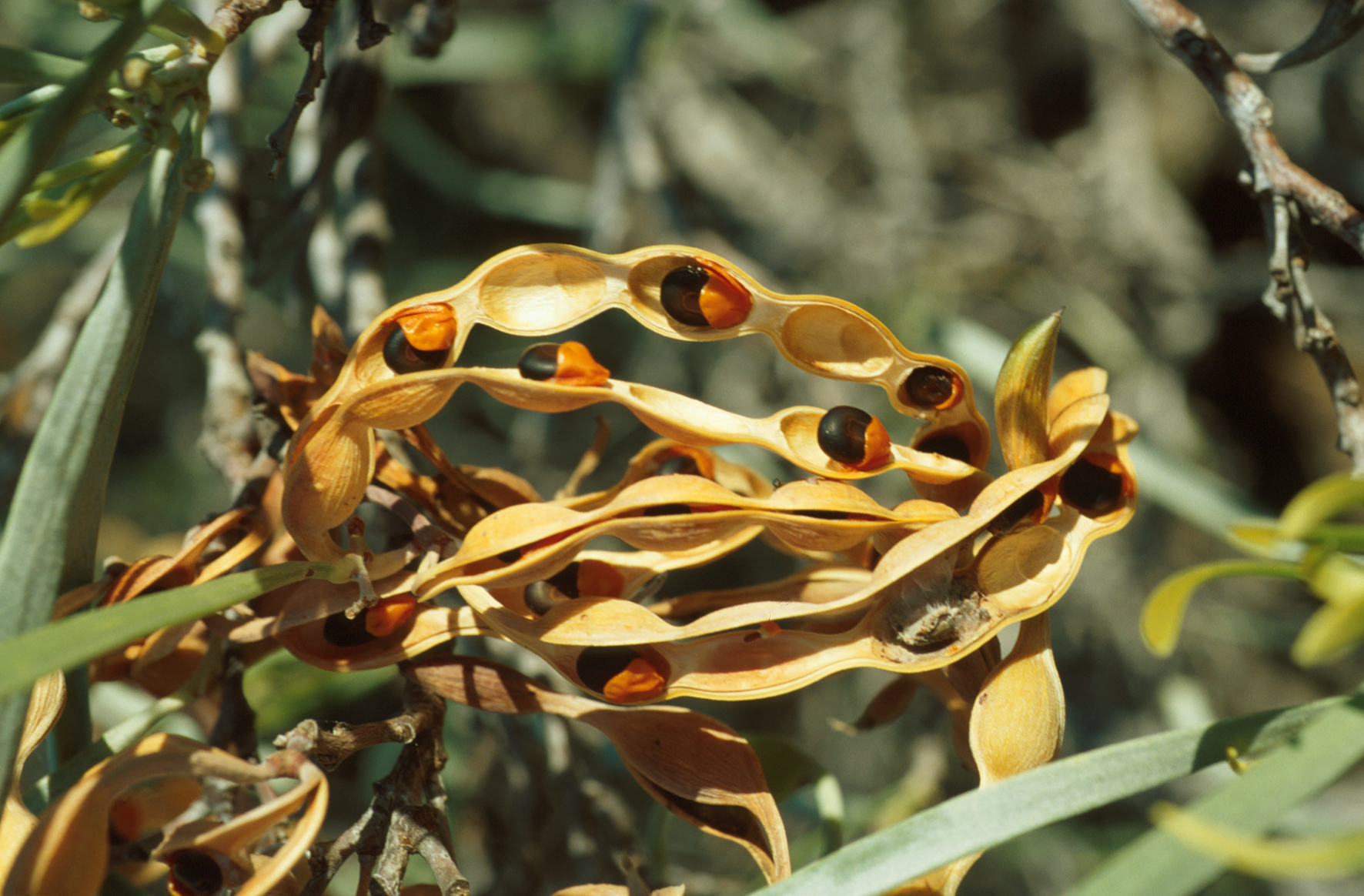
Seed pod

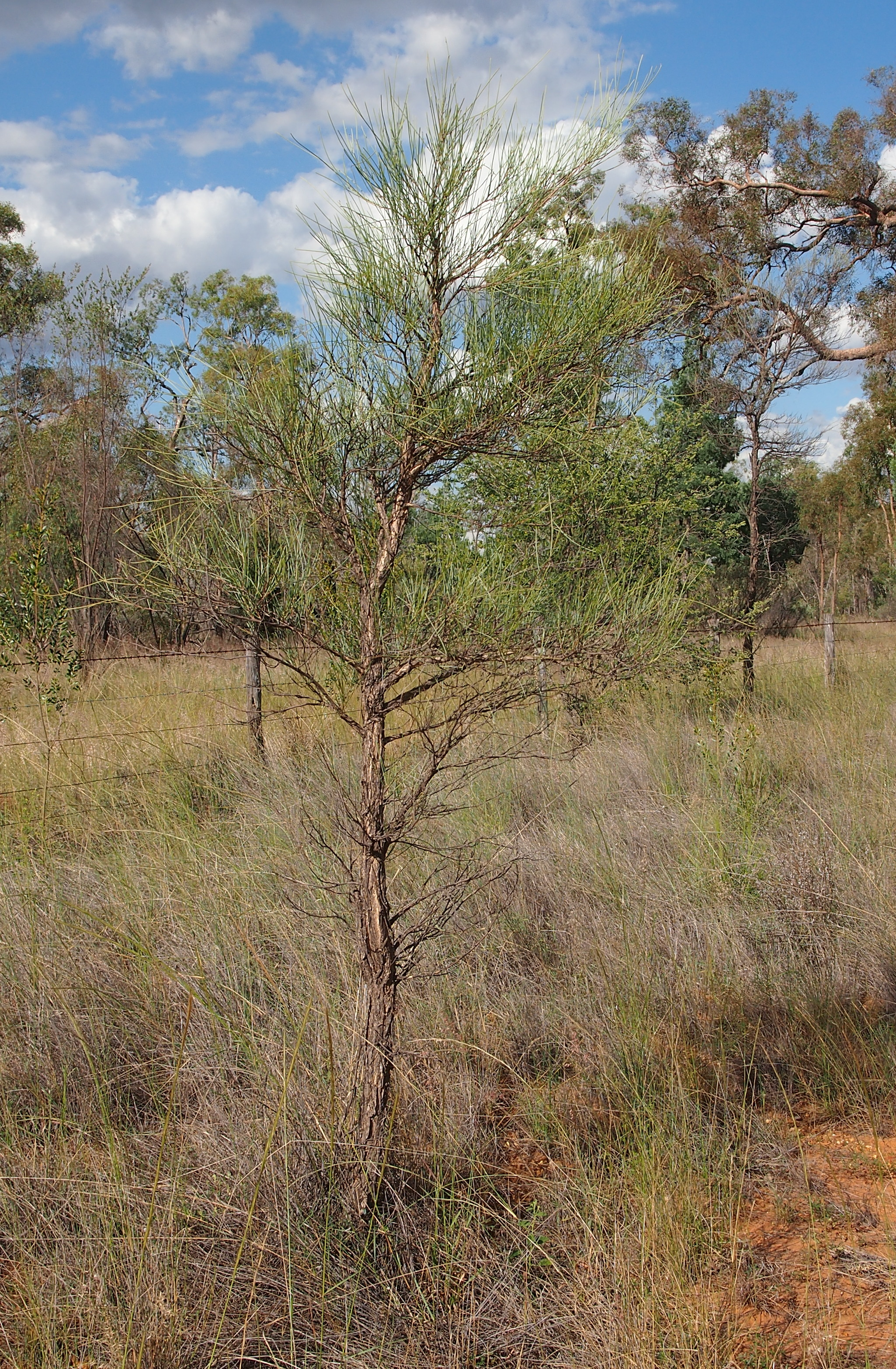
Habit

Acacia coriacea, commonly known as wirewood, wiry wattle or desert oak, is a species of flowering plant in the family Fabaceae and is endemic to northern Western Australia. It is a spreading shrub or tree with thin bark, linear to very narrowly elliptic phyllodes, spherical heads of pale lemon yellow or cream-coloured flowers and twisted, curved or coiled pods resembling a string of beads. Indigenous Australians know the plant as Gunandru.

== Description ==
Acacia coriacea is a spreading shrub or tree that typically grows to a height of up to 10 m (33 ft) and has thin, fibrous and fissured bark, the new growth covered with silky hairs. Its phyllodes are linear to very narrowly elliptic, 90–230 mm (3.5–9.1 in) long and 1–7 mm (0.039–0.276 in) wide and leathery with many closely parallel, fine veins. The flowers are borne in one or two spherical heads on a peduncle 3–10 mm (0.12–0.39 in) long, each head with 15 to 50 pale lemon yellow to cream-coloured flowers. Flowering time depends on subspecies, and the pods are twisted, openly curved or coiled and resemble a string of beads up to 320 mm (13 in) long and 5–13 mm (0.20–0.51 in) wide and leathery. The seeds are broadly elliptic, 4–8 mm (0.16–0.31 in) long, black and glossy with a large, bright orange aril.

== Taxonomy ==
Acacia coriacea was first formally described in 1825 by Augustin Pyramus de Candolle in his Prodromus Systematis Naturalis Regni Vegetabilis. In 1993, Richard Cowan and Bruce Maslin described three subspecies of A. coriacea, and the names of two subspecies are recognised by the Australian Plant Census:

- Acacia coriacea DC. subsp. coriacea has mostly more or less erect, almost straight to very shallowly curved phyllodes 5–10 mm (0.20–0.39 in) wide, and flowers in June and July.
- Acacia coriacea subsp. pendens R.S.Cowan & Maslin has mostly pendulous, shallowly to strongly curved phyllodes 1.5–5 mm (0.059–0.197 in) wide, and flowers from March to August.

A third subspecies, Acacia coriacea subsp. sericophylla (F.Muell.) R.S.Cowan & Maslin is now recognised as a synonym of Acacia sericophylla F.Muell. and is found in Western Australia, the Northern Territory, South Australia, Queensland and New South Wales.

== Distribution and habitat ==
Wirewood is widely distributed in the north of Western Australia where it grows in sand or limestone on coastal dues and ridges, sandplains and along watercourses in the Avon Wheatbelt, Carnarvon, Gascoyne, Gibson Desert, Great Sandy Desert, Pilbara, Swan Coastal Plain, Tanami and Yalgoo bioregions. Subspecies coriacea has a near coastal distribution in the Avon Wheatbelt, Carnarvon, Gascoyne, Pilbara, Yalgoo bioregions and subsp. pendens in the Carnarvon, Gascoyne, Pilbara and Swan Coastal Plain bioregions.

== Conservation status ==
Both subspecies of Acacia coriacea are listed as "not threatened" by the Government of Western Australia Department of Biodiversity, Conservation and Attractions.

== Uses ==
Indigenous Australians used the seeds of this species as a food source, the wood for making spears and shields, and the ash produced from the wood was used with native tobacco (Nicotinia species) as a chewing quid.

== See also ==
- List of Acacia species
