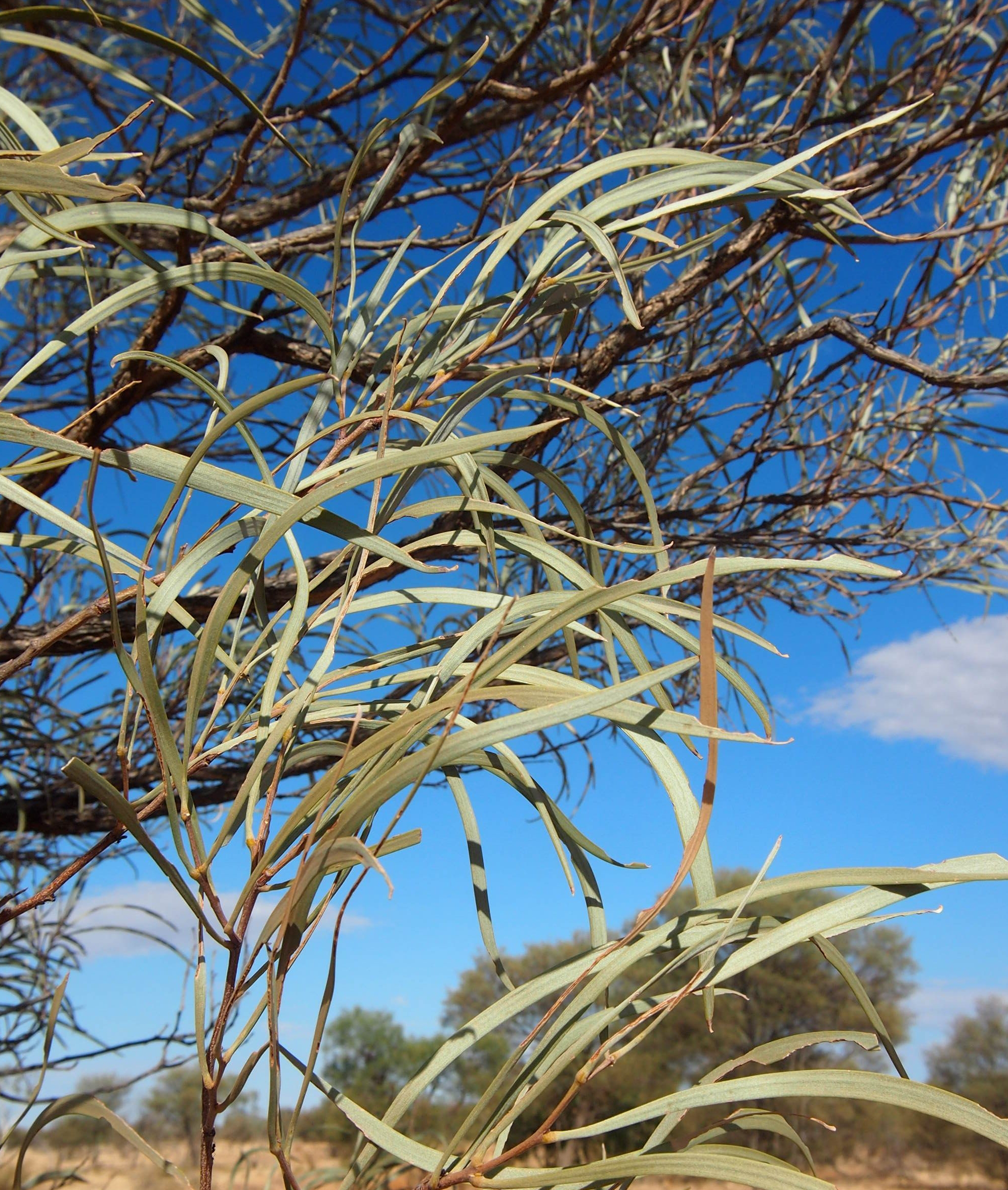

Scientific classification
- Kingdom: Plantae
- Clade: Tracheophytes
- Clade: Angiosperms
- Clade: Eudicots
- Clade: Rosids
- Order: Fabales
- Family: Fabaceae
- Subfamily: Caesalpinioideae
- Clade: Mimosoid clade
- Genus: Acacia
- Species: A. sericophylla

Binomial name
- Acacia sericophylla F.Muell.
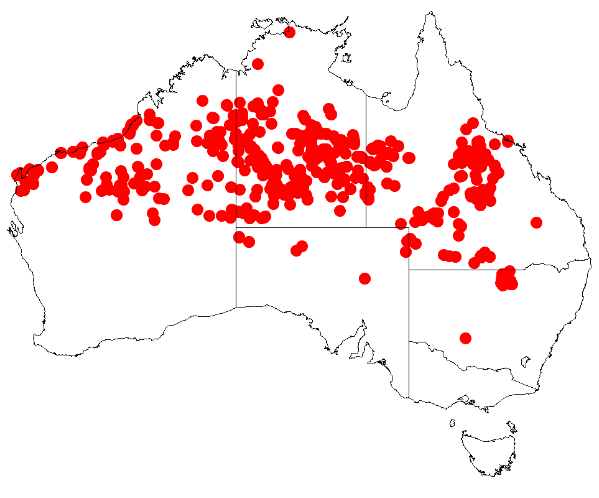
- Occurrence data from AVH

Synonyms
- Racosperma coriaceum subsp. sericophyllum (F.Muell.) Pedley; Acacia coriacea subsp. sericophylla (F.Muell.) R.S.Cowan & Maslin; Acacia coriacea var. angustior Maiden

= Acacia sericophylla =

Species of legume

Acacia sericophylla is a shrub or tree commonly known as the desert dogwood, desert oak or cork-bark wattle. To the Indigenous Australian people of the Pilbara, the Nyangumarta peoples, it is known as Pirrkala. The species is of the genus Acacia and the subgenus Plurinerves.

== Description ==
The gnarled shrub or tree typically grows to a height of 2 to 6 metres (7 to 20 ft) but can be as tall as 10 m (33 ft) in Queensland. It usually has a single stem or few mains stems at the base from where it can regenerate after bushfires. It has thick spongy grey to back bark that fissures longitudinally and is spongy and yellow beneath. The brittle branchlets tend to break easily and are covered in fine silvery hairs but becoming glabrous with age. Like most species of Acacia it has phyllodes rather than true leaves. The silvery grey-green phyllodes are found in clumps at the end of the branchlets and have a long narrowly linear and strap-like appearance. They are flat with a length of 12 to 35 cm (4.7 to 13.8 in) and a width of 1 to 7 mm (0.039 to 0.276 in) and is somewhat rigid with a leathery texture. The spreading to erect phyllodes are straight or recurved and densely covered in fine silky hair when young but becoming sub-glabrous as they age with many parallel, fine longitudinal nerves that are equally prominent.

== Taxonomy ==
In 1859 Ferdinand von Mueller described this species, and named it Acacia sericophylla. In 1993, Richard Cowan and Bruce Maslin assigned it to the subspecies, Acacia coriacea subsp. sericophylla. However, the Council of Heads of Australasian Herbaria via the Australian Plant Census currently (2006) recognises the plant as Acacia sericophylla.

== Etymology ==
The species epithet, sericophylla, derives from the Greek words, sericos, meaning 'silken' and phyllon, meaning 'leaf', and refers to the dense silky hairs found particularly on the young phyllodes.

== Distribution ==
It is native to an area in the Northern Territory and the Kimberley and Pilbara regions of Western Australia. It is also found in New South Wales and South Australia.

== Gallery ==
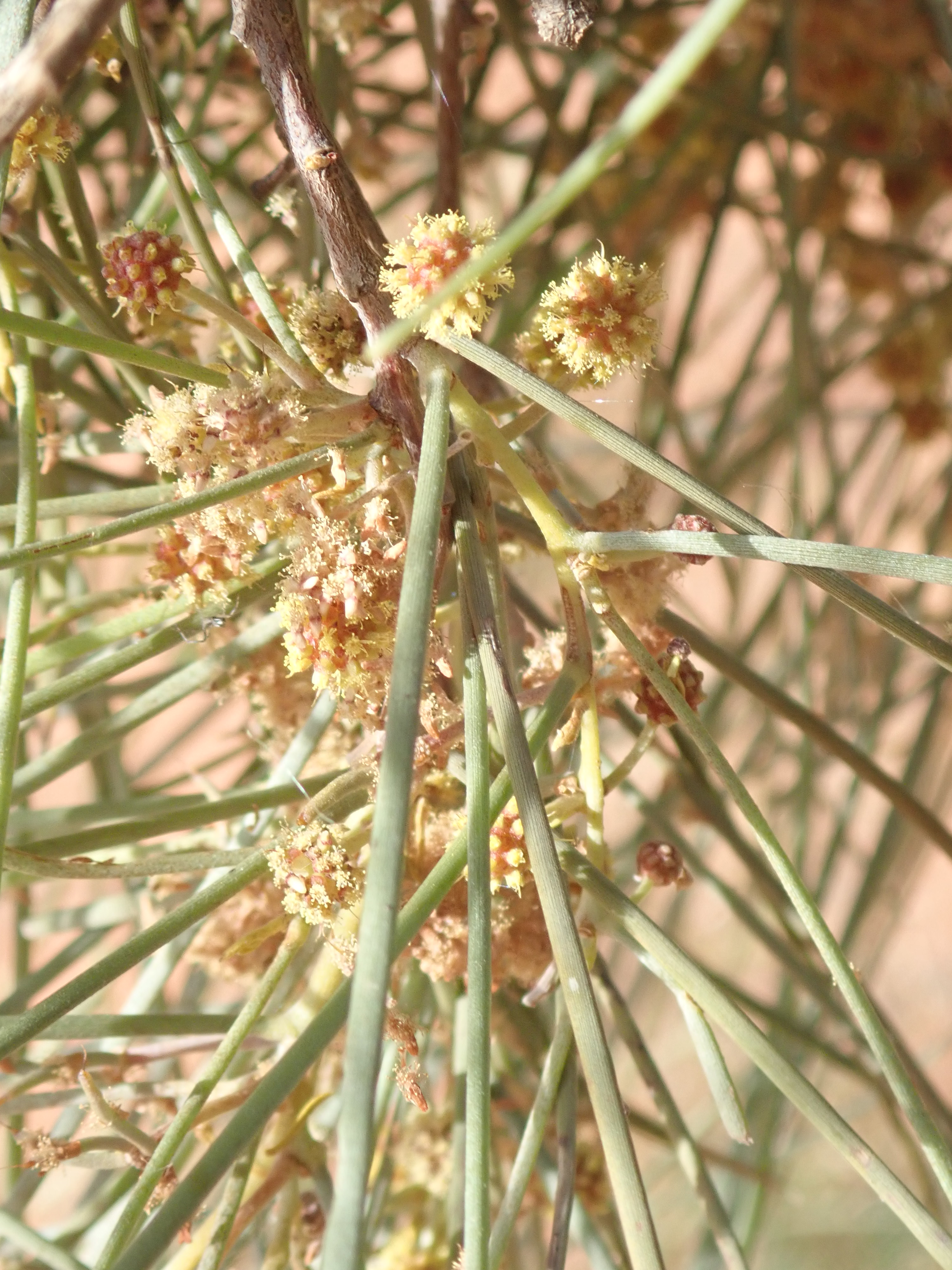

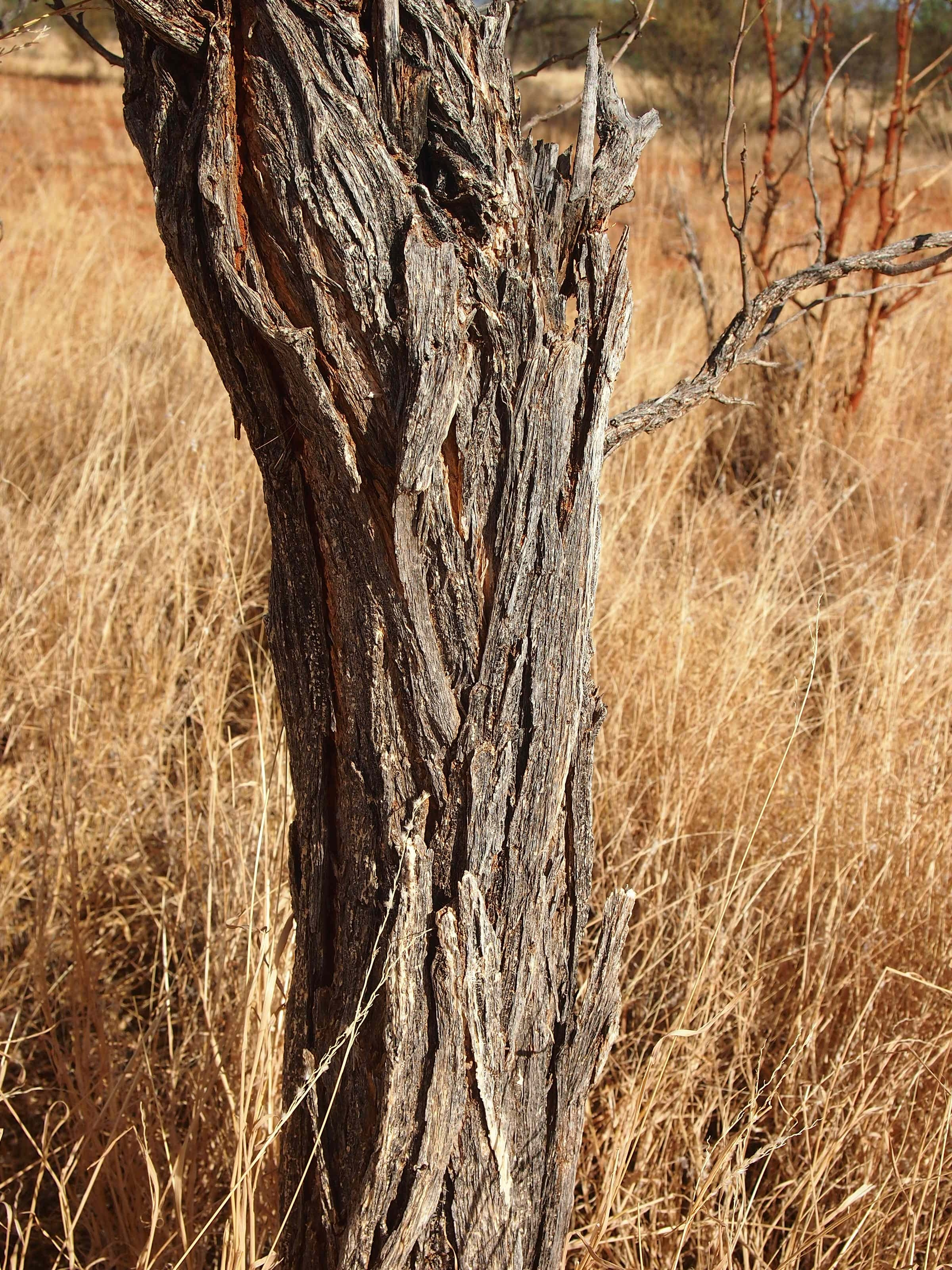

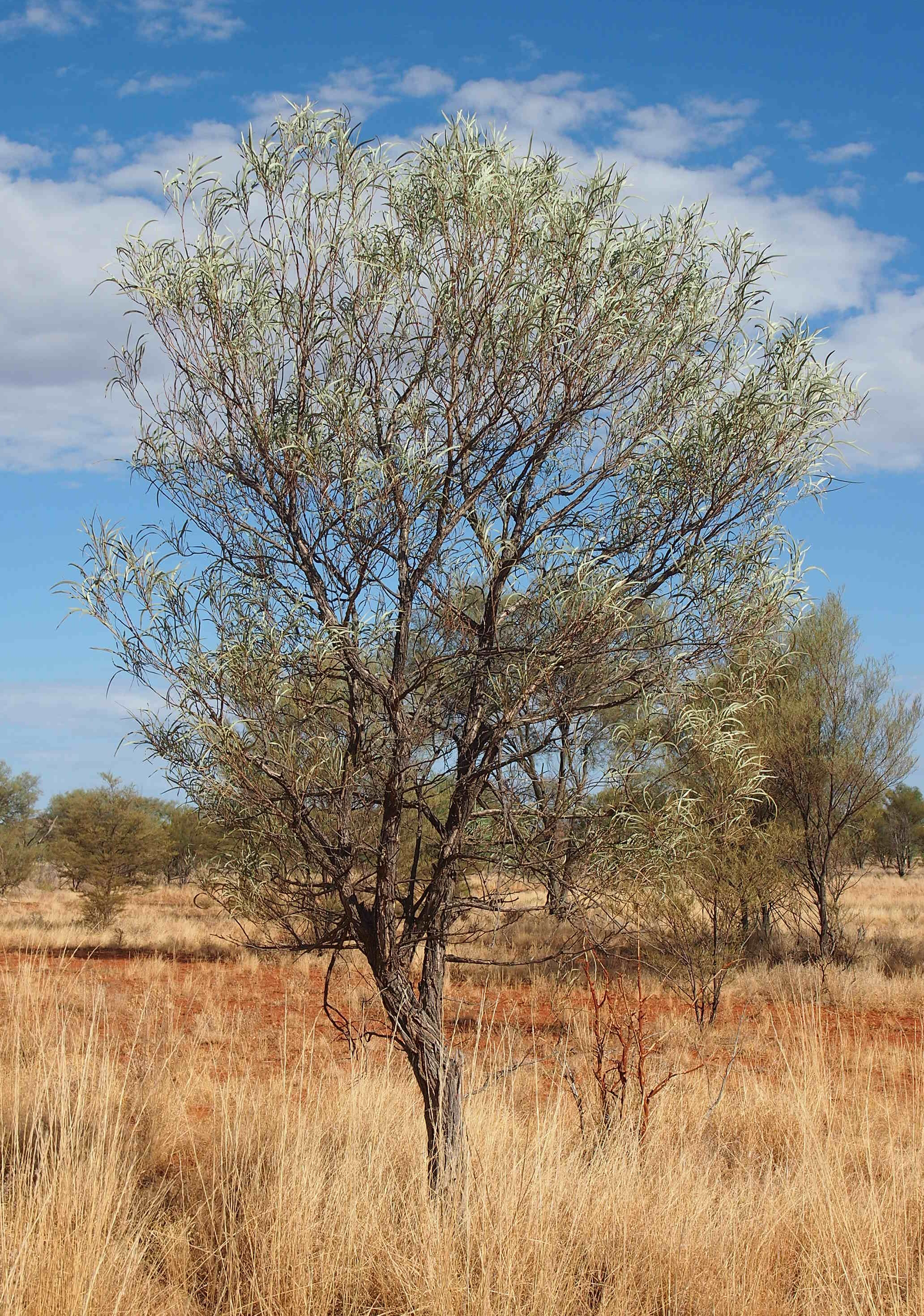

== See also ==
- List of Acacia species
