= The Reluctant Debutante =

The Reluctant Debutante may refer to:

- The Reluctant Debutante (play), a 1955 play by William Douglas-Home
- The Reluctant Debutante (film), a 1958 film starring Rex Harrison
