= This Is My Street =

1964 British film by Sidney Hayers

- British quad poster by Tom Chantrell
- Directed by: Sidney Hayers
- Screenplay by: Bill MacIlwraith
- Based on: This Is My Street by Nan Maynard
- Produced by: Jack Hanbury; Peter Rogers
- Starring: June Ritchie; Ian Hendry
- Cinematography: Alan Hume
- Edited by: Roger Cherrill
- Music by: Eric Rogers
- Production company: Peter Rogers Productions (as Adder Productions)
- Distributed by: Warner-Pathé Distributors (UK)
- Release date: 15 January 1964 (London)
- Running time: 94 min
- Country: United Kingdom
- Language: English

This Is My Street is a 1964 British black and white kitchen sink drama film directed by Sidney Hayers and starring June Ritchie, Ian Hendry, Avice Landone, Annette Andre, Mike Pratt, Philippa Gail and John Hurt. The screenplay was by Bill MacIlwraith, based on the 1962 novel of the same name by Nan Maynard.

The film concerns a bored housewife living in a run-down inner city London house who begins an affair with her mother's lodger. The film is a rare non-comedy from Peter Rogers. It reunited the two leads, Ritchie and Hendry, from their previous dramedy film Live Now – Pay Later (1962).

== Plot ==
On Jubilee Place, a working class area of terraced housing in Battersea, housewife Marge Graham lives a life of drudgery with her unambitious husband Sid and her small daughter, Cindy.

Lodging next door with Marge's mother Lily is Harry, a flashy salesman and nightclub owner who repeatedly attempts to seduce her. In the next house live Kitty and Steve, with their good-time girl daughter Maureen. Maureen works in a cafe with young Charlie, and is having an affair with a rich dentist, Mark. Marge works in a department store selling handbags where manager, Mr Fingus, makes continual advances on her.

One day Cindy goes missing and Harry helps with the search. Finding Cindy in a scrapyard, Marge realises Harry is much more paternal than Sid and she agrees to go for a drink and has a nice afternoon. Meanwhile, Maureen sets her eyes on another rich man, Mr Ransome, while out in a club with Mark.

Marge begins an affair with Harry and they meet regularly at a mews owned by Joe. After an argument at Harry's club, Maureen and Mark are caught in a car crash: Mark is killed and Maureen badly injured, scarring her face. She accepts the offer of a date with Charlie, whose offers had previously received short shrift.

Harry eventually tires of Marge when he meets her younger, educated sister Jinny, who has returned from college. It is clear that he is a man for whom the chase is more interesting than the catch, in this case even more so because Jinny has a boyfriend, hospital doctor Paul; the two men, with their differing class backgrounds, show mutual resentment of each other, with Paul denigrating Harry as a barrow boy.

Marge is still infatuated with Harry and jealous of Jinny, and suggests eloping and leaving Cindy behind. When she discovers Harry plans to marry her sister she attempts to kill herself by putting her head in the gas oven. She is saved by a rain shower which leads her mother to bring in the washing, close enough to the house that she smells the gas. She has left a suicide note exposing her affair with Harry, but her mother's chance intervention means an ambulance rushes her to hospital. Lily evicts Harry, and Jinny breaks it off with him. Lily suggests to Sid that he finds another job in "a nice clean area".

Ultimately, Marge recovers and Jinny marries Paul. Harry is left alone, with the final scene showing Marge rejecting his renewed advances before going home to her old street and what appears to be a happier household.

== Cast ==
- Ian Hendry as Harry King
- June Ritchie as Marge Graham
- Avice Landone as Lily, Marge's mother
- Meredith Edwards as Steve, Maureen's father
- Madge Ryan as Kitty, Maureen's mother
- John Hurt as Charlie, a barista
- Annette Andre as Jinny, Marge's sister
- Philippa Gail as Maureen, a good-time girl
- Mike Pratt as Sid Graham, Marge's husband
- Tom Adams as Paul, Jinny's boyfriend
- Hilda Fenemore as Doris
- Susan Burnet as Phyllis
- Robert Bruce as Mark,
- John Bluthal as Joe, the barman in Harry's club
- Carl Bernard as Fred
- Margaret Boyd as Granny
- Patrick Cargill as Ransome
- Margo Johns as Isabel
- Derek Francis as Fingus, Marge's boss
- Ursula Hirst as Molly
- Sheraton Blount as Cindy

== Production ==
Nan Maynard's novel was published in 1962. Film rights were bought by Peter Rogers, best known for comedy movies. Rogers, who was executive producer, assigned Jack Hanbury who had made Live Now, Pay Later to produce. Filming took place in London and Pinewood studios starting July 1963. According to Filmink "the film, very kitchen sinky but well done, was made by some old Anglo-Amalgamated hands" such as Rogers and Sidney Hayers.

== Critical reception ==
Variety praised the "crisp direction" and "excellent performances" although felt it "topples into unconvincing melodrama."

The Daily Telegraph felt there was "little reward in this story. Only in the acting."

The Monthly Film Bulletin wrote: "This highly moral tale bears all the hallmarks of a serial from one of the not-so-glossy women's weeklies. Weak on characterisation and over-loaded with sub-plot, it forms a very flimsy base for a screenplay. ... The central situation, of an ill-suited young couple tied together by their own indiscretion, could have been interesting, and June Ritchie and Mike Pratt are quite capable of giving the characters depth. But the effect of their few nicely felt scenes together is dissipated in irrelevant episodes at the shop, and interest is further weakened by continual switches to the absurd activities of a sluttish neighbour who has seduced the local dentist. ... Ian Hendry repeats his Live Now, Pay Later performance with commendable conviction in view of the part's shaky motivation."

The Radio Times called it "a well-written, nicely shot squalor fest."

AllMovie called it an "unsavory British programmer."

Britmovie noted a "Sixties’ backstreets bedroom drama adapted from Nan Maynard's rather middling novel. Director Sidney Hayers fashions an interesting drama amid the sordid squalor of London and creates a number of genuinely sympathetic characters. Ian Hendry giving a performance of compelling magnetic brilliance as the jack-the-lad charmer capable of turning from seducer to scoundrel and back again in the blink of an eye."

TV Guide wrote: "The even direction smooths over the ugly plot of a mean little womanizer...Hendry and Ritchie exude interesting chemistry together, and the movie spins right along while they are on the screen."

Leslie Halliwell described the film as an "unremarkable low-life drama".

Filmink argued "the film is interesting and well-acted but was a box office flop (even though it had sex). For some reason, it didn’t make much of a critical impact, either."
