= Live Now – Pay Later =

1962 British film by Jay Lewis

Live Now, Pay Later
- British theatrical poster
- Directed by: Jay Lewis
- Written by: Jack Trevor Story
- Based on: novel All on the Never-Never by Jack Lindsay
- Produced by: Jack Hanbury
- Starring: Ian Hendry; June Ritchie; John Gregson
- Cinematography: Jack Hildyard
- Edited by: Roger Cherrill
- Music by: Ron Grainer
- Production company: Woodland
- Distributed by: Regal Films International (UK)
- Release date: 25 October 1962 (UK)
- Running time: 104 minutes
- Country: United Kingdom
- Language: English

Live Now – Pay Later is a 1962 British black-and-white comedy-drama film directed by Jay Lewis and starring Ian Hendry, June Ritchie and John Gregson. It was loosely based on the 1961 novel All on the Never-Never by Jack Lindsay. However, the script was solely written by Jack Trevor Story, who subsequently authored the 1963 novel Live Now, Pay Later.

The film focuses on the life of a salesman who habitually seduces his female customers in order to convince them to buy his products. He is secretly embezzling money from the sales, and has a side career as a blackmailer.

The lead actors, Hendry and Ritchie, would reunite two years later to film the kitchen sink realism drama This Is My Street (1964).

== Plot ==
Unsavoury door-to-door salesman Albert Argyle's technique involves bedding his female customers in an attempt to seduce them to buy on credit. As well as being unfaithful to his pregnant girlfriend, the unrepentant Argyle is also cheating his boss out of profits, and trying his hand at a spot of blackmail.

== Cast ==
- Ian Hendry as Albert Argyle
- June Ritchie as Treasure
- John Gregson as Callendar
- Liz Fraser as Joyce Corby
- Geoffrey Keen as Reggie Corby
- Jeanette Sterke as Grace
- Peter Butterworth as Fred
- Nyree Dawn Porter as Marjorie Mason
- Ronald Howard as Cedric Mason
- Harold Berens as Solly Cowell
- Thelma Ruby as Hetty
- Monte Landis as Arnold (credited as Monty Landis)
- Kevin Brennan as Jackson
- Malcolm Knight as Ratty
- Bridget Armstrong as Gloria
- Judith Furse as Mrs. Ackroyd (credited as Judith Furze)
- Joan Heal as Mrs. Pocock
- Michael Brennan as bailiff
- Geoffrey Hibbert as Price
- William Kendall as Major Simpkins
- Georgina Cookson as Lucy
- Justine Lord as Coral Wentworth
- Andrew Cruickshank as vicar
- John Wood as curate
- Peter Bowles as Reginald Parker
- Diana King as woman looking round flat
- Robert Raglan as first bailiff on doorstep
- Richard Caldicot as Wisbech

== Production ==
Filming locations included London, Elstree and Luton.

A version of the opening titles song "Live Now, Pay Later" (Clive Westlake, Ruth Batchelor) was released in 1963 as a single by Doug Sheldon (Decca 45-F 11529).

== Release ==
The only known print was discovered and made available on DVD in June 2020 and has been shown on Talking Pictures TV.

== Reception ==
Variety considered the film to have "many amusing moments, but overall it is untidy and does not develop the personalities of some of the main characters sufficiently. Extraneous situations are dragged in without helping the plot development overmuch."

Monthly Film Bulletin said: "It is the cheerful unpretentiousness of its social criticism which gives the film its rather endearing flavour. ... The unevenness in the acting and the perpetual uncertainty of mood indicates a lack of control in Jay Lewis's direction. Nevertheless his film is constantly entertaining, and it has both a conscience and a heart."

Leslie Halliwell opined: "A satirical farce which lets fly in too many directions at once and has a cumulatively cheerless effect despite some funny moments."

The Radio Times Guide to Films gave the film 5/5 stars, calling the film: "a remarkably cynical and revealing portrait of Britain shifting from postwar austerity into rampant consumerism and the Swinging Sixties. ... Hendry's character is appalling, yet he is also sympathetic since he's the only person who ever does anything in a society built on inertia and the sense of defeat that ony wartime victory can bring. "

In Hollywood, England: British Film Industry in the Sixties Alexander Walker wrote: "The film's cynicism was total, its targets were ruthlessly demolished, and everything had the vigour of a cartoonist's world where the action is carried an instant beyond its naturalistic conclusion."
