= June Ritchie =

British actress (born 1941)

- Born: June Rose Ritchie; 31 May 1941 (age 85); Blackpool, Lancashire, England
- Occupation: Actress
- Years active: 1962–1988
- Spouse(s): Marcus Turnbull (m. 1962; div. 1976) David Drew (m. 1985; died 2015)
- Children: 1

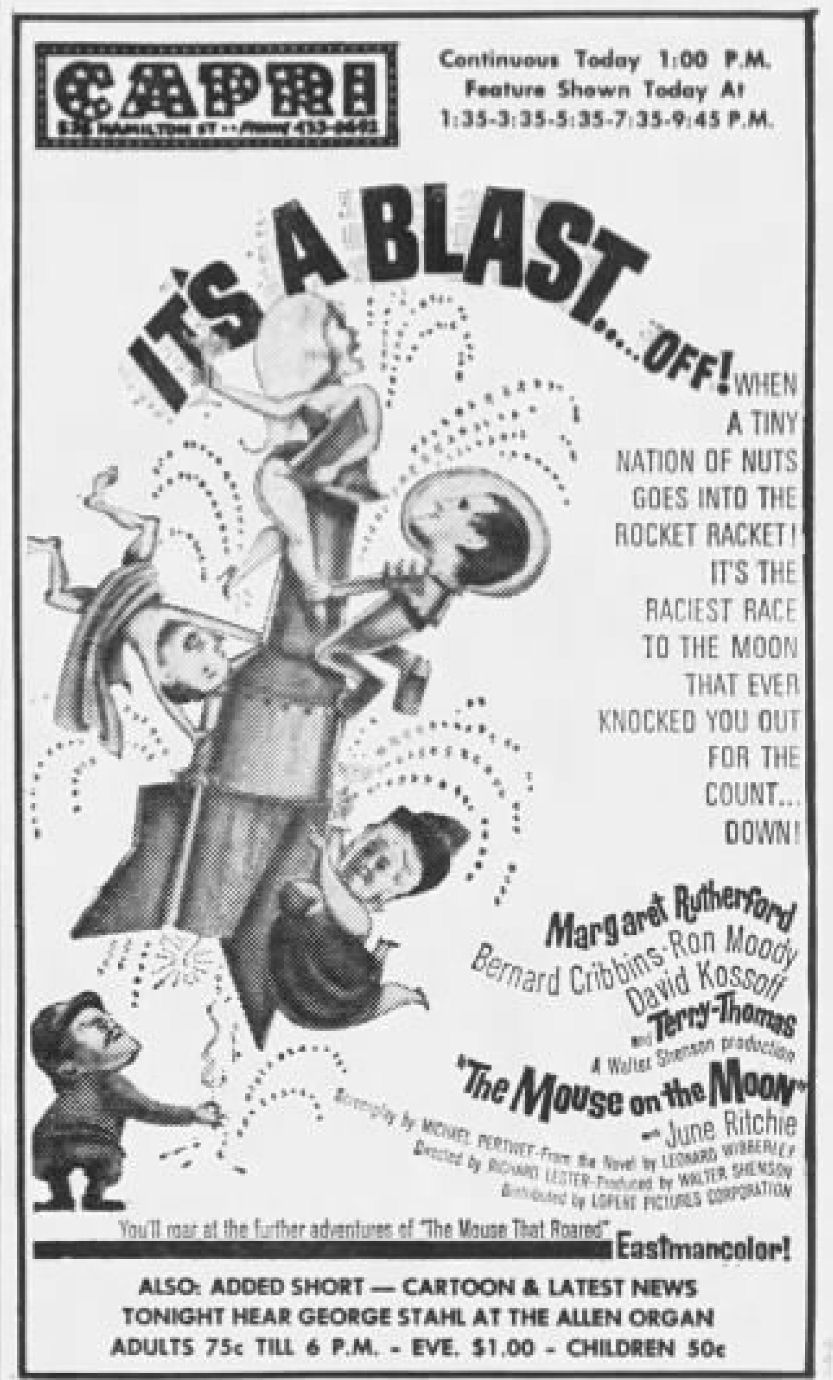
Likeness of June Ritchie shown at top of rocket in advertisement for The Mouse on the Moon

June Rose Ritchie (born 31 May 1941) is a British actress.

== Early life ==
She attended Stretford Children's Theatre from the age of nine. She left school in Manchester, aged 16, to train as a secretary, working for the Manchester Ship Canal Company. Her parents lived in Shrewsbury Street and King’s Crescent in Old Trafford.

Ritchie trained at RADA, where she graduated in 1961, having won the Emile Littler Award for Most Promising Actress and the Ronson Award for the outstanding female student.

== Biography ==
She came to prominence after starring in the role of Ingrid Rothwell opposite Alan Bates in the 1962 film adaptation of A Kind of Loving.

In 1963, she starred with Margaret Rutherford in the comedy The Mouse on the Moon and appeared as a 'dance hostess' with Sylvia Syms in The World Ten Times Over. She also made two movies with Ian Hendry at around the same time, Live Now, Pay Later and This is My Street.

After marrying and starting a family, she cut back on her acting roles, but later made a successful comeback on stage (most memorably in a high-profile musical adaptation of Gone with the Wind in London), and appeared in many British television dramas including The Mallens, The Saint, The Baron, Minder, Tales of the Unexpected, and Père Goriot.

In 1966 Ritchie starred in The Saint (S5, E10 'Little Girl Lost') as Mildred, a fake hostage attempting and failing to get the better of Simon Templar (The Saint).

In 1975, Ritchie joined Ray Davies and the Kinks on their album, Soap Opera, having played the same role in the 1974 single drama, Starmaker, on which the album was based. She sang the role of "Andrea" ("Norman"'s wife).

== Filmography ==
=== Film ===
Year	Title	Role	Notes
1962	A Kind of Loving	Ingrid Rothwell	
1962	Live Now – Pay Later	Treasure	
1963	The Threepenny Opera	Polly Peachum	
1963	The Mouse on the Moon	Cynthia	
1963	The World Ten Times Over	Ginnie	
1964	This Is My Street	Margery Graham	
1968	The Syndicate	Mari Brant	
1972	Hunted	Margaret Lord	Short

=== Television ===
Year	Title	Role	Notes
1965	Heiress of Garth	Josina Griffin	Miniseries
1966	The Saint	Mildred	"Little Girl Lost"
1967	Thirty-Minute Theatre	Jean Charnock	"Later a Man Was Questioned"
1967	The Baron	Jeanne Varda	"Roundabout"
1967	Champion House	Della Chevalier	"Sonata for a Solo Fiddle"
1968	City '68	Trixie	"Love Thy Neighbor"
1968	Père Goriot	Delphine	Miniseries
1971	The Ten Commandments	Jan Lee	"Be Lucky"
1971	The Persuaders!	Charlie	"Element of Risk"
1974	Sam	Jean Tufton	"A New World", "Legacy"
1974	Armchair Cinema	Susan Carter	"Sea Song"
1974	Late Night Drama	Wife	"Starmaker"
1975	You're On Your Own	Kathy	"No One Wants Any Trouble", "Assault", "Contract to Kill"
1977	The Sunday Drama	Sheila Quince	"The Cuckoo Calls"
1978	Crown Court	Alison Freeman	"The Change"
1979	Kids	Janie Snell	"Harry"
1979	Bloomers	Diana	"1.1", "1.2"
1979	Minder	Jo	"The Bounty Hunter"
1980	The Mallens	Constance Radlet	Regular role
1982	Tales of the Unexpected	Jenny Morrissey	"Operation Safecrack"
1982	All for Love	Esme Fanshow	"A Bit of Singing and Dancing"
1983	A Brother's Tale	Lucy Browning	"1.1", "1.3"
1984	December Flower	Margaret Grey	TV film
1985	Summer Season	Sheila	"Picture Friend"
1988	The Ruth Rendell Mysteries	Nancy Lake	"Shake Hands Forever: Parts 1–3"
