= Gerry Sundquist =

British actor (1955–1993)

- Born: Gerald Christopher Sundquist; 6 October 1955; Chorlton, Manchester, England
- Died: 1 August 1993 (aged 37); London, England
- Occupation: Actor

Gerald Christopher Sundquist (6 October 1955 – 1 August 1993) was an English actor.

== Early life ==
Sundquist was born in Chorlton and grew up there with his older brother and younger sister. He developed an interest in acting at primary school and joined the Stretford Children's Theatre while still at school St. Augustine's R.C. Grammar School in Wythenshawe.

On leaving school at 16 he worked briefly on the night shift at the Kellogg's factory in Manchester, but keen to pursue his acting career he soon moved to London.

== Career ==
He appeared in various film and television roles during the 1970s and early 1980s, most notably Soldier & Me, The Mallens and The Siege of Golden Hill, with guest appearances on shows such as Space: 1999 alongside Martin Landau and fellow guest star Patrick Troughton (episode "The Dorcons"). He appeared as Alan Strang in Equus at the Albery theatre in the mid-1970s. Sundquist also appeared in an episode of Crown Court, The Meeting Place (1977).

His films included The Black Panther (1977), Meetings with Remarkable Men (1979), Passion Flower Hotel (1978), a.k.a. Boarding School, playing Fibs alongside Nastassja Kinski, whom he dated for a while, and the 1979 British disco film The Music Machine. He had a part in Youssef Chahine's acclaimed Alexandria... Why? (1978, Berlin Film Festival Silver Bear winner). He played Pip in Great Expectations (1981) and Gringoire in The Hunchback of Notre Dame (1982), and appeared to have a promising career, but after his appearances in The Last Days of Pompeii (1984) and the horror film Don't Open Till Christmas (1984), his career and personal life went into steep decline, with him later developing a drug problem. He played a character role in an episode of the TV police serial The Bill in 1992, his first acting role in eight years.

== Death ==
On 1 August 1993, Sundquist jumped under a train at Norbiton railway station in England.

== Filmography ==
1976	Title	Role	Notes
1976	Space: 1999	Malic	Episode: "The Dorcons"
1977	The Black Panther		
1978	Passion Flower Hotel	Frederick Irving Benjamin Sinclair	
1978	Alexandria... Why?	Thomas 'Tommy' Friskin	
1979	Meetings with Remarkable Men	Karpenko	
1979	The Music Machine	Gerry Pearson	
1979	Switch	Sgomma	
1982	The Hunchback of Notre Dame	Pierre Gringoire	TV movie
1984	The Last Days of Pompeii	Clodius	3 episodes
1984	Blind Date	Subway Gang Member #3	
1984	Don't Open Till Christmas	Cliff Boyd	
