= Tony Boncza =

English actor

Tony Boncza is an English actor. Born in Fulham, educated in Sevenoaks and Kingston upon Thames. Originally trained as a journalist.

== Career ==
A past member of the National Youth Theatre and trained at the Central School of Speech and Drama, he has appeared in several British television series and films. He started his TV career in 1979 when he appeared in Why can't I go Home (ATV), with Dick Turpin and For Maddie with Love following in 1980. He also appeared in Strangers, Squadron (BBC), Jackanory Playhouse (BBC), Noddy (Granada TV), Ties of Blood (BBC), Eric Sykes's If You Go Into The Woods Today... (Thames TV), Crimewatch (BBC) and Morcambe and Wise's Night Train to Murder. Feature films include: Chariots of Fire and Empire of the Sun.

He then concentrated on stage work and directing, co-founding Theatre West in the early '90s, also collaborating with Guy Masterson, directing the following one-man plays, The Boy's Own Story, Animal Farm, A Soldier's Song and redirecting Under Milk Wood, the last three plays touring worldwide. 1996, nominated "The Stage" Best Actor "Edinburgh Fringe" for the role of Carl in "House of Correction". In the late '90s he co-wrote Barton Stacey and the Theft of the Elgin Marbles for radio with Roger Leach. He returned to television in 2002, when he appeared on The Inspector Lynley Mysteries and most recently as Ashley Jennings in an episode of EastEnders 2008, and as George in an episode of Hotel Babylon 2008.

2008 commenced with Boncza and Lumley - back by public demand, a comedy revue with Nicholas Lumley at the Salisbury Playhouse; a live radio/internet broadcast of The War of the Worlds for the AV Festival '08, directed by Joanna Read; open-air Shakespeare in Japan and the role of Gus in the world premier of 1800 Acres at the Riverside Studios, written by David Myers and directed by Alex Helfrecht.

== Filmography ==
Year	Title	Role	Notes
1987	Empire of the Sun	British Prisoner #7	
2018	The Guernsey Literary and Potato Peel Pie Society	Man #1 in Pub	
