= The Tell-Tale Heart (1960 film) =

1960 British film by Ernest Morris

- DVD cover
- Directed by: Ernest Morris
- Written by: Brian Clemens; Eldon Howard
- Based on: The Tell-Tale Heart by Edgar Allan Poe
- Produced by: Edward J. Danziger; Harry Lee Danziger
- Starring: Laurence Payne; Adrienne Corri; Dermot Walsh
- Cinematography: James Wilson
- Edited by: Derek Parsons
- Music by: Tony Crombie; Bill LeSage
- Distributed by: Warner-Pathé Distributors
- Release date: December 1960 (UK)
- Running time: 78 minutes
- Country: United Kingdom
- Language: English

The Tell-Tale Heart (also known as The Hidden Room of 1,000 Horrors) is a 1960 British second feature ('B') horror film directed by Ernest Morris and starring Laurence Payne, Adrienne Corri and Dermot Walsh. It was produced by the Danzigers. The screenplay by Brian Clemens and Eldon Howard is a loose adaptation of the 1843 short story of the same name by Edgar Allan Poe. The film was released in England in December 1960, and in the U.S. in February 1962 as The Hidden Room of 1,000 Horrors.

== Plot ==
Edgar Marsh, a shy librarian obsessed with erotica, becomes infatuated with his neighbour Betty Clare when he sees her undressing in her bedroom. He invites her to dinner, and although she clearly is uncomfortable with the attention he pays her, he showers her with jewellery and fantasises about their future. Complications arise when he introduces her to his friend Carl Loomis, whom Betty finds far more attractive and appealing. After witnessing Carl and Betty together in her bedroom through his window, Edgar bludgeons Carl to death with a poker and buries him beneath the floorboards in his piano room. His overwhelming guilt leads him to believe a ticking metronome and the incessant dripping of a tap actually are the sound of his victim's heart still beating. Later, when Betty sneaks into Edgar's house and discovers the poker in his bedroom closet, she reports it to the police. When the police question Edgar at his home, the believed sounds of the beating heart drive him insane and he confesses to the police. He then tries to flee up the stairs and is shot and falls onto a spike, dying. Edgar suddenly wakes up, and it is revealed that the whole events of the film were a dream. However, Edgar sees Betty arriving in town, and fears the whole thing possibly starting again.

== Cast ==
- Laurence Payne as Edgar Marsh
- Adrienne Corri as Betty Clare
- Dermot Walsh as Carl Loomis
- Selma Vaz Dias as Mrs Vine, Edgar's housekeeper
- John Scott as inspector
- John Martin as police sergeant
- Pamela Plant as manageress
- Annette Carell as Carl's landlady
- Graham Ashley as Neston
- David Lander as jeweller
- Rosemary Rotheray as Jackie
- Suzanne Fuller as Dorothy
- Yvonne Buckingham as Mina
- Richard Bennett as Mike
- Elizabeth Paget as Elsie, a tart
- Frank Thornton as barman
- Joan Peart as street girl
- Nada Beall as old crone
- Patsy Smart as Mrs Harlow
- Brian Cobby as young man
- Madeleine Leon as young woman
- David Courtney in a bit part

== Production ==
Around the time the film was produced typical budget of the Danzigers' feature film was £15,000. This cost a little more due to its period setting and necessitated shooting in black and white.

== Critical reception ==
The Monthly Film Bulletin wrote: "A modest but surprisingly effective little film, which contains much more genuine Poe atmosphere than many a more ambitious adaptation of this tale, despite the alterations which mean that the story is now a dream, with a vicious circle ending strongly reminiscent of Dead of Night. The shoestring sets and lighting, in fact, contribute enormously towards achieving the correct oppressive aura of dank, seedy, gaslit Victoriana. Excellent playing by Laurence Payne, Adrienne Corri and Dermot Walsh, from a script which concentrates intelligently on establishing a credible triangle relationship before moving into the horror, creates three-dimensional characters of real interest. There are, to be sure, one or two purely conventional horror-film gimmicks – lightning zigzagging across the sky at a moment of crisis – but on the whole it is done imaginatively (if not very originally) rather than crudely. The tell-tale heart itseif is particularly effective, where the whole house – the pendulum of a clock, a dripping tap, a ticking metronome, a swinging chandelier, a piece fallen from a chess-board and rolling gently back and forth – seems to pick up and magnify the terrifying beating rhythm which haunts Edgar."

The Tell-Tale Heart was selected by the film historians Steve Chibnall and Brian McFarlane as one of the 15 most meritorious British B films made between World War II and 1970. They note that it also received enthusiastic reviews at the time of its release from The Monthly Film Bulletin and Kinematograph Weekly.
