= Hardi Pardaillan! =

1964 film

- Directed by: Bernard Borderie
- Written by: André Haguet; André Legrand
- Screenplay by: Bernard Borderie
- Based on: Story by Michel Zévaco
- Starring: Gérard Barray; Valérie Lagrange; Philippe Lemaire
- Cinematography: Henri Persin
- Edited by: Christian Gaudin
- Music by: Paul Misraki
- Production companies: Latin Union Film; EIA - Euro International Film
- Release date: 8 April 1964
- Running time: 98 minutes
- Countries: France; Italy
- Language: French

Hardi Pardaillan! is a 1964 French-Italian adventure film directed by Bernard Borderie and starring Gérard Barray, Valérie Lagrange, Philippe Lemaire, Sophie Hardy, and Guy Delorme. It was also known as The Gallant Musketeer. It is based on a novel by Michel Zévaco.

== Plot ==
The defender of King Henry III, the chevalier de Pardaillan, tries to thwart the assassination plans of the duke of Guise

== Cast ==
- Gérard Barray as Pardaillan
- Valérie Lagrange - Bianca Farnèse
- Philippe Lemaire - The Duke of Angoulême
- Guy Delorme - Maurevert
- Sophie Hardy
- Jean Topart - The Duke of Guise
- Jacques Castelot - Henri III
- Caroline Rami - Rousotte
- Robert Berri - Gueule d'mour

== Release ==
Hardi Pardaillan! was shown in Italy on 29 February 1964 and in France on 8 April 1964.
