= Sexton Blake (TV series) =

British television drama series (1967–1971)

- Genre: Detective
- Starring: Laurence Payne; Roger Foss; Dorothea Phillips
- No. of series: 4
- No. of episodes: 50

Production
- Running time: 30 Minutes
- Production companies: Rediffusion; Thames Television

Original release
- Network: ITV
- Release: 1967 – 1971

Sexton Blake is a detective television series which aired on ITV from 1967 to 1971. It starred Laurence Payne as Sexton Blake and Roger Foss as Tinker.

== Plot ==
In keeping with Sexton Blake's classic print adventures, Payne's Blake drove a white Rolls-Royce named "The Grey Panther" and owned a bloodhound named Pedro.

Typical of the television show's sometimes-fantastic storylines (all of which lasted for two to six episodes) was 1968's "The Invicta Ray" in which a villain dressed in a costume and hood of sackcloth-like material and, under the Invicta Ray, became invisible so that he could commit crimes without being seen.

== Cast ==
- Laurence Payne as Sexton Blake
- Roger Foss as Edward Clark 'Tinker'
- Dorothea Phillips as Mrs. Bardell
- Meredith Edwards as Inspector 'Taff' Evans
- Elizabeth Bell as Julia Mangini
- Edward Jewesbury as Dr. John Mangini
- Philippa Gail as Carole Vane
- Charles Morgan as Inspector Davies
- Eric Lander as Inspector Cardfish

== Production ==
=== Development ===
The show was originally produced by Ronald Marriott for Rediffusion, with Thames Television taking over production in 1968.

Pedro was played by one or more bloodhounds (bitches), which doubled as 'Henry', for Chunky dog food adverts with Clement Freud, and were owned by the then secretary of the Bloodhound Club, Mrs Bobbie Edwards.

During rehearsals for the show in 1968, Laurence Payne was blinded in his left eye by a rapier.

== Episodes ==
=== Season 1 ===
- The Find-The-Lady Affair. 4 episodes. Monday 25 September 1967 to Monday 16 October 1967.
- Knave of Diamonds. 5 episodes. Monday 23 October 1967 to Monday 20 November.
- The Great Tong Mystery. 4 episodes. Monday 27 November 1967 to Monday 18 December 1967.
- The Vanishing Snowman. Christmas Special. Monday 25 December 1967.
- House of Masks. 4 episodes. Monday 1 January 1968 to Monday 22 January 1968.
- The Invicta Ray. 4 episodes. Monday 29 January 1968 to Monday 19 February 1968.

=== Season 2 ===
- The Case of the Gasping Goldfish. 2 episodes. Thursday 14 November 1968 to Thursday 21 November 1968.
- Return of the Scorpion. 2 episodes. Thursday 28 November 1968 to Thursday 5 December 1968.
- The Great Train Robbery. 2 episodes. Thurs 16 January 1969 to Thurs 23 January 1969.
- The Great Soccer Mystery. 3 episodes. Thurs 30 January 1969 to Thurs 13 February 1969.

=== Season 3 ===
- Sexton Blake and Captain Nemesis. 3 episodes. Wed 8 October 1969 to Wed 22 October 1969.
- Sexton Blake versus The Gangsters. 3 episodes. Wed 29 October 1969 to Wed 12 November 1969.
- Sexton Blake and the Frightened Man. 2 eps. Wed 19 November 1969 to Wed 26 November 1969.
- Sexton Blake and the Undertaker. 3 episodes. Wed 3 December 1969 to Wed 17 December 1969.
- Sexton Blake and the Toy Family. 2 episodes. Wed 23 December 1969 to Wed 30 December 1969.

=== Season 4 ===
- Sexton Blake and the Puff Adder. 6 episodes. Wed 9 December 1970 to Wed 13 January 1971.

== Release ==
=== Availability ===
Of 50 episodes, only the first episode is thought to still exist. This is available to watch on YouTube.
