= Passion Flower Hotel =

- Theatrical poster
- Directed by: André Farwagi
- Written by: Roger Longrigg (novel); Ken Globus; Paul Nicholas
- Produced by: Artur Brauner; Robert Russ; Allexander Zellermeyer
- Starring: Nastassja Kinski; Gerry Sundquist; Stefano D'Amato; Gabriele Blum; Sean Chapman
- Cinematography: Richard Suzuki; Jair Ganor; Gernot Köhler; Sandro Tamborra
- Edited by: Daniela Padalewski-Junek
- Music by: Francis Lai
- Distributed by: Atlantic Releasing Corporation; Audifilm
- Release date: April 14, 1978
- Running time: 100 minutes
- Country: Germany
- Language: German
- Box office: $306,061 (USA)

Passion Flower Hotel (also known as Leidenschaftliche Blümchen, also known as Boarding School) is a 1978 coming of age comedy film directed by André Farwagi. It is a liberal adaptation of the 1962 novel Passion Flower Hotel and stars Nastassja Kinski as one of the schoolgirls, in her third feature film.

== Plot ==
Summer of 1956. Curious American girl Deborah Collins (Kinski) arrives at the St. Clara's Boarding School in Switzerland. The school headmistress wants to use Deborah as a tool to discipline the other girls but she is revealed to be more experienced and daring in sexual matters. The girls now plot to lose their virginity with the boys in the private school across the lake. After Deborah finally has sex with Frederick Sinclair (Sundquist) in a romantic setting, she is expelled and the other girls feel that everything will be so sad and boring without her. She informs the headmistress that she will tell everyone that the school is run by disreputable teachers if she expels the other girls. She departs on a train after kissing Frederick goodbye.

== Cast ==
- Nastassja Kinski as Deborah Collins
- Gerry Sundquist as Frederick Irving Benjamin Sinclair
- Stefano D'Amato as Plumpudding
- Gabriele Blum as Cordelia
- Sean Chapman as Rodney
- Veronique Delbourg as Marie Louise
- Nigel Graves as Carlos
- Marion Kracht as Jane
- Carolin Ohrner as Gabi
- Fabiana Udenio as Gina
- Kurt Raab as Fletcher
