= Three Hats for Lisa =

1965 British film by Sidney Hayers

- UK poster by Tom Chantrell
- Directed by: Sidney Hayers
- Screenplay by: Leslie Bricusse; Talbot Rothwell
- Story by: Leslie Bricusse
- Produced by: Jack Hanbury
- Starring: Joe Brown; Sophie Hardy; Sid James; Una Stubbs; Dave Nelson
- Cinematography: Alan Hume
- Edited by: Tristam Cones
- Music by: Leslie Bricusse (songs); Eric Rogers
- Production company: Seven Hills Productions
- Distributed by: Anglo-Amalgamated Film Distributors (UK)
- Release date: May 30, 1965
- Running time: 99 minutes
- Country: United Kingdom
- Language: English

Three Hats for Lisa, first titled as One Day in London, is a 1965 British musical comedy film directed by Sidney Hayers and starring Joe Brown, Sid James, Sophie Hardy, Una Stubbs and Dave Nelson. The screenplay was by Leslie Bricusse and Talbot Rothwell.

It was one of a number of musicals from Nat Cohen with pop stars from this period. Cohen had turned down a chance to make a film with The Beatles.

== Plot ==
Three young Cockneys take a day off work to meet Lisa Milan, an Italian movie star, at Heathrow airport. She travels with them and their taxi driver in search of some typically British hats. The rule of the game is to steal a hat from its wearer. Lisa wants a bobby's helmet, a businessman's bowler, and the bearskin cap from a palace guard. A musical chase ensues around Swinging Sixties London, evading press and police.

== Cast ==
- Joe Brown as Johnny Howjego
- Sophie Hardy as Lisa Milan
- Una Stubbs as Flora
- Sid James as Sid Marks
- Dave Nelson as Sammy
- Peter Bowles as Pepper
- Seymour Green as Signor Arturo Molfino
- Josephine Blake as Miss Penny
- Jeremy Lloyd as Guards Officer
- Michael Brennan as Police Sergeant
- Eric Barker as Station Sergeant
- Howard Douglas as cinema caretaker
- Dickie Owen as policeman
- Norman Mitchell as truck driver
- Arnold Bell as Hilton doorman
- Barrie Gosney as reporter

== Musical numbers ==
All songs written by Leslie Bricusse, except where noted.

- "This is a Special Day" (written by Leslie Bricusse and Robin Beaumont) as performed by Joe Brown
- "The Boy on the Corner of the Street Where I Live" as performed by Una Stubbs, Sandra Hampton and Beth McDonald
- "Something Tells Me (I Shouldn't Do This)" as performed by Joe Brown, Una Stubbs and Dave Nelson
- "I'm the King of the Castle" as performed by Joe Brown, Una Stubbs and Dave Nelson
- "Bermondsey" as performed by Joe Brown, Sophie Hardy, Sid James, Una Stubbs and Dave Nelson
- "L O N D O N (London Town)" as performed by Joe Brown, Sophie Hardy, Sid James, Una Stubbs and Dave Nelson
- "Three Hats for Lisa" as performed by Joe Brown, Sophie Hardy, Sid James, Una Stubbs and Dave Nelson
- "Two Cockney Kids" as performed by Joe Brown and Una Stubbs
- "Have You Heard About Johnny Howjego?" as performed by Sid James, Una Stubbs and Dave Nelson and Chorus
- "That's What Makes A Girl A Girl" - performed by Joe Brown, Sophie Hardy, Sid James, Una Stubbs and Dave Nelson
- "I Fell in Love With An Englishman" as performed by Sophie Hardy
- "A Man's World" as performed by Sophie Hardy
- "Covent Garden" as performed by Joe Brown, Sophie Hardy, Sid James, Una Stubbs and Dave Nelson and Chorus
- "One Day in London" as performed by Chorus
- "St. Patrick's Day" (traditional) as performed by the Band of the Irish Guards

== Production ==
The film was announced as A Day in London. It was Sophie Hardy's first English language movie. Filming started 28 September 1964 in London. There were three weeks of location work, then the united shifting to Pinewood Studios. Filming ended in January 1965.

Joe Brown had previously made What a Crazy World. He thought that film was "great fun" but disliked Three Hats for Lisa:

I hated that film but I got along with Sidney James and Una Stubbs. The songs were poor even though they were written by Leslie Bricusse. I hate dancing and they made me dance. It was going to be made in summer but it was put back and shot in the middle of winter. We were dancing on the roof of London Airport, which felt like the coldest place in the world.

Brown's daughter Samantha was born during filming.

== Reception ==
Kine Weekly wrote: "Gay, modern, musical comedy which includes a novel travelogue of London. [...] A bright, tuneful and happy film. ... The music is pleasing without being memorable."

Monthly Film Bulletin wrote: "Neither the composition nor the use of colour is particularly imaginative, which means that visually the film is nothing more than average British fare. But a teenage musical intelligent enough to make ninety-nine minutes pass as swiftly as this does, is welcome on many other counts."

Variety said: "Modest, breezy musical full of good humor. Slick direction and cheerful, young cast make this an above-average British tuner."

Leslie Halliwell opined: "Minor musical, silly, but good to look at."

The Radio Times Guide to Films wrote: "Not even the presence of the great Sidney James can elevate this story of Sophie Hardy's search for three typically English hats. The script, co-written by Carry On regular Talbot Rothwell, raises a few smiles, but the songs signifiy a new low in screen pop music."
