= Nyree Dawn Porter =

New Zealand–British actress (1936–2001)

Nyree Dawn Porter OBE
- Porter photographed by Vivienne, 1960s
- Born: Ngaire Dawn Porter; 22 January 1936; Napier, New Zealand
- Died: 10 April 2001 (aged 65); Wandsworth, London, England
- Occupation: Actress
- Years active: 1954–1998
- Spouses: Byron O'Leary (m. 1959; died 1970) Robin Halstead (m. 1975; div. 1987)
- Children: 1

Nyree Dawn Porter OBE (birth name Ena Nyree Dawn Porter; some secondary sources give her birth name as Ngaire Dawn Porter; 22 January 1936 – 10 April 2001) was a New Zealand–born British actress. She started performing on stage in New Zealand, moving to the UK in 1958. She is best known for her role as Irene in the BBC series The Forsyte Saga (1967).

== Early life and education ==
Ngaire Dawn Porter was born in Napier, New Zealand, on 22 January 1936.

She changed her name after moving to England in 1958, so that British people could pronounce it. (Note: Nyree is the phonetic spelling of how Porter's birth forename Ngaire is often pronounced in English.)

== Career ==
=== Stage ===
Porter's first professional work was touring with the New Zealand Players Trust. She was acclaimed for such roles as Jessica in The Merchant of Venice and Juliet in Romanoff and Juliet. She also performed in revues and musicals, including a local Napier production of The Desert Song in 1955.

She moved to Britain in 1958 after winning a Miss Cinema talent competition for young actresses organised by Rank, with the prize of a round-the-world trip and a film test in London. Although the test was probably little more than a publicity stunt, she decided to stay and was soon acting in the theatre. Look Who's Here at the Fortune Theatre in Drury Lane was her first West End appearance. She followed this with the role of Connie in Neil Simon's first West End play, Come Blow Your Horn, and a string of other appearances.

In 1968, Porter appeared with Peter Wyngarde in The Duel, a play by John Holton Dell based on the novel by Chekhov. This launched a tour at the Theatre Royal, Brighton, on 18 March.

She had two roles in Stephen Sondheim's Sunday in the Park with George, at the National Theatre in 1990, played Olivia in Twelfth Night at the Shaw Theatre, and Rosalind in As You Like It at the Ludlow Festival. She later toured in Australia, in Jeffrey Archer's Beyond Reasonable Doubt, and later in The King and I.

=== Television and films ===
She appeared in several television productions, including an early episode of The Avengers ("Death on The Slipway", 1961); and the title role in the BBC's 1964 adaptation of Madame Bovary.

Porter is probably best remembered for her role as Irene in the hit BBC series The Forsyte Saga. The 1967 series, which attracted audiences of 18 million, saw her described by critics as "the first romantic sex symbol of the telly age." She herself said, "I was an unknown theatre actress and Irene gave me international fame and opened doors for me".

Although subsequently finding similar high-profile roles harder to come by, she starred in the 1968 comedy series Never a Cross Word and four years later opposite Robert Vaughn in Gerry Anderson's live-action series The Protectors. Porter also played the title role in the 26-part daytime serial For Maddie with Love, as a woman with only a few months left to live. Her husband was played by Ian Hendry. The programme ran for two series, in 1980 and 1981.

Her film appearances included Live Now – Pay Later (1962), The Cracksman (1963), Two Left Feet (1963), and two horror anthologies: The House That Dripped Blood (1971) and From Beyond the Grave (1974). She also appeared in Hilary and Jackie (1998) as the ballerina Dame Margot Fonteyn.

== Awards and honours ==
In the 1970 Birthday Honours, Porter was appointed an Officer of the Order of the British Empire (OBE) for services to television.

In 1975, she won the Spanish TP de Oro 'Best Foreign Actress' award for The Protectors.

== Personal life ==
Her first husband, Byron O'Leary, died in 1970 of an accidental drug overdose. In 1975 she married actor Robin Halstead after the birth of their daughter, Natalya Francesca Halstead. The couple divorced in 1987.

== Death ==
She died of leukaemia in 2001 at age 65 in Wandsworth, London. She was cremated at Putney Vale Crematorium, and her ashes were buried in the cemetery there.

== Filmography ==
=== Film ===
Year	Title	Role	Notes
1960	Identity Unknown	Pam	
1960	Sentenced for Life	Betty Martin	
1961	Part-Time Wife	Jenny Briggs	
1962	Live Now – Pay Later	Marjorie Mason	Also starring Ian Hendry
1963	The Cracksman	Muriel	
1965	Two Left Feet	Eileen	
1971	The House That Dripped Blood	Ann	Segment: "Sweets to the Sweet"
1974	From Beyond the Grave	Susan Warren	Segment: "The Elemental"
1976	Morir... dormir... tal vez sonar	Ana Mari	
1998	Hilary and Jackie	Margot Fonteyn	

=== Television ===
Year	Title	Role	Notes
1959	ITV Play of the Week	Vera Berridge	"Touch Wood"
1960	Deadline Midnight	Julie Sykes	"1.5"
1960	Man from Interpol	Mary	"The Soul Peddlers"
1960	Danger Man	Stewardess	"The Island"
1961	The Avengers	Liz Wells	"Death on the Slipway" (with lead Ian Hendry)
1961	Drama 61-67	Mary Mills	"The Diamond Run"
1961	Armchair Theatre	Mildred	"His Polyvinyl Girl"
1961	Edgar Wallace Mysteries	Mary Greer	"Man at the Carlton Tower"
1962	Reunion Day	Judith Rubin	TV film
1962	The Third Man	Miss Wyvern	"A Question of Libel"
1963	Corrigan Blake	Francesca	"The Scientific Approach"
1963	No Hiding Place	Vicky West	"Death of Samantha"
1963	Drama 61-67	Caroline West	"Dead Darling"
1963	ITV Play of the Week	Vicky, the Princess Aziza	"Vicky and the Sultan"
1964	Madame Bovary	Emma Bovary	TV miniseries
1964	Ghost Squad	Yvette	"It Won't Be a Stylish Marriage"
1964	Judith Paris	Judith Paris	TV miniseries
1964	The Indian Tales of Rudyard Kipling	Janoo	"The Sending of Dana Da"
1964	The Saint	Patsy Butler	"The Scorpion"
1964	Love Story	Tina Morris	"Arranged for Strings"
1965	Public Eye	Sheila Reynolds	"I Went to Borrow a Pencil, and Look What I Found"
1965	Thursday Theatre	Agnes Potter	"The Kidders"
1965	Sherlock Holmes	Lady Brackenstall	"The Abbey Grange"
1965	Six Shades of Black	Melusine	"A Loving Disposition"
1965	ITV Play of the Week	Nina	"A Couple of Dry Martinis"
1965	Armchair Mystery Theatre	Lisa	"Wake a Stranger"
1965	Blackmail	Mrs. Donahoe	"The Case of the Phantom Lover"
1966	The Liars	Hermione	TV series
1967	The Forsyte Saga	Irene Forsyte	Main role
1968	The Gamblers	Rita Ironside	"Mates!"
1968	Armchair Theatre	Barbara	"A Second Look"
1968	Never a Cross Word	Deirdre Baldock	TV series
1970	Hassan	Pervaneh	TV film
1970	Jane Eyre	Blanche Ingram	TV film
1972–1974	The Protectors	Contessa Caroline di Contini	Main role
1973	Armchair 30	Stephanie	"Ross Evan's Story"
1974	Thriller	Laura Vallance	"Ring Once for Death" (US title: "Death in Small Doses")
1976	Softly, Softly	Jane Rawlings	"Alarums and Excursions"
1980	The Martian Chronicles	Alice Hathaway	TV miniseries
1980	For Maddie with Love	Maddie Laurie	Main role (again alongside Ian Hendry)
1986	David Copperfield	Mrs. Steerforth	TV miniseries
