= The Syndicate (1968 film) =

1968 British film by Frederic Goode

- DVD cover
- Directed by: Frederic Goode
- Written by: Geoffrey Hays
- Produced by: Harry Field
- Starring: William Sylvester; June Ritchie; Robert Urquhart
- Cinematography: George Stevens
- Music by: Edwin Astley
- Color process: Colour by Technicolor
- Production company: Associated British-Pathé
- Distributed by: Warner Pathé Distributors (UK); American International Pictures (USA TV)
- Release date: 1968
- Running time: 106 minutes
- Country: United Kingdom
- Language: English

The Syndicate (also known as Kenya: Country of Treasure and Treasure in Kenya) is a 1968 British film directed by Frederic Goode for Pathé Films, from a screenplay by Geoffrey Hays, based on the 1960 novel of the same name by Denys Rhodes. The film stars William Sylvester, June Ritchie, Robert Urquhart and Christian Doermer.

== Plot ==
An American, down on his luck, joins a German uranium prospector and a Kenyan couple to search for uranium. A series of tragic and mysterious events strike the party.

== Cast ==
- William Sylvester as Burt Hickey
- June Ritchie as Mari Brant
- Robert Urquhart as George Brant
- Christian Doermer as Kurt Hohmann
- John Bennett as Dr. Singh

== Release ==
The film was passed by the British Board of Film Classification on 3 March 1967, with a running time of 106 minutes. It was cut to 63 minutes and released as a supporting feature to Wait Until Dark in September 1968. A 91-minute version was obtained by American International Pictures television division as part of a feature-film package, and was retitled Kenya: Country of Treasure.

== Reception ==
The Monthly Film Bulletin wrote: "Frederic Goode has more than once in the past proved himself an interesting if minor director, but this African adventure is very undistinguished. Nothing is made of the Kenya locations, and the story is stilted melodrama. Substantial cuts may be partly to blame, but even in this truncated version the film is nowhere near incisive enough to be remotely interesting."
