= Robert Urquhart (actor) =

Scottish character actor (1921–1995)

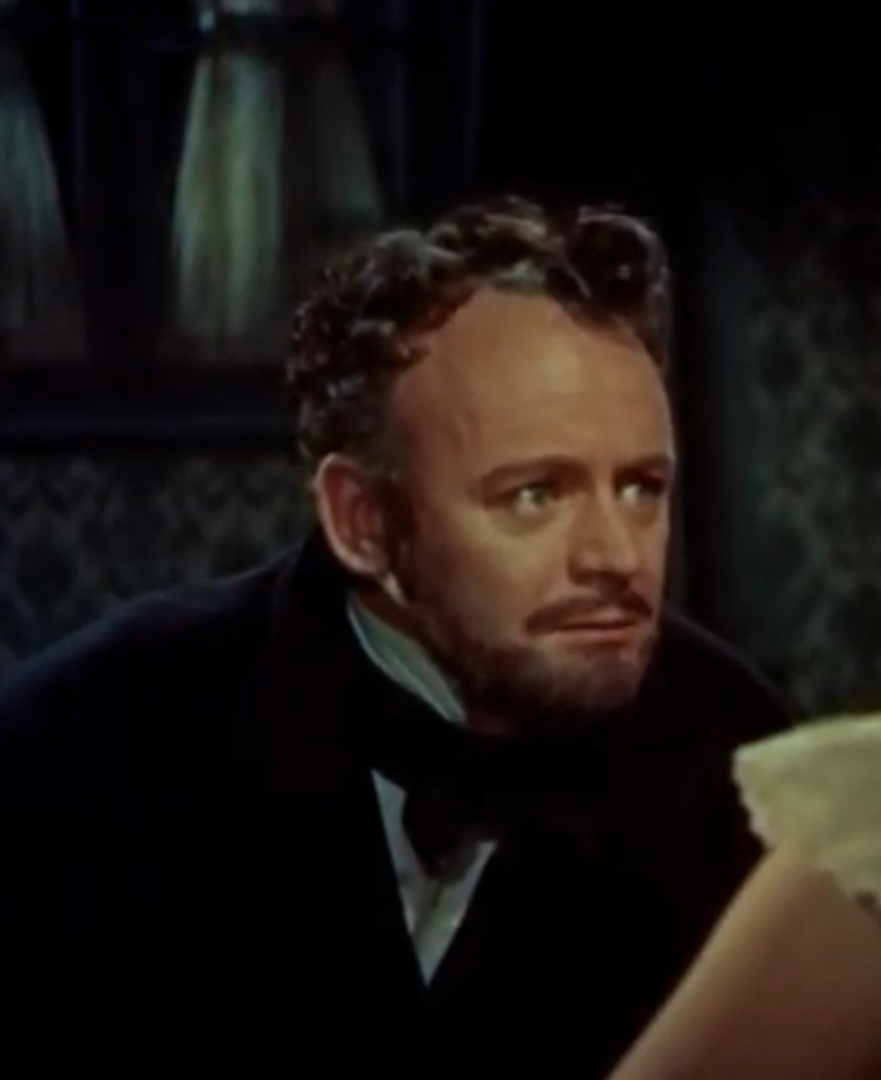
- Urquhart in the trailer for The Curse of Frankenstein (1957)
- Born: 16 October 1922; Ullapool, Scotland
- Died: 21 March 1995 (aged 72); Edinburgh, Scotland
- Education: Royal Academy of Dramatic Art; George Heriot's School
- Occupations: Actor, hotelier
- Years active: 1952–1994
- Spouses: Zena Walker (m. 1956, divorced) Jean Urquhart (m. 1976)
- Children: 4

Robert Urquhart (16 October 1922 – 21 March 1995) was a Scottish character actor who worked on the stage, for British television, and in film. His breakthrough role was Paul Krempe in The Curse of Frankenstein in 1957, along with Peter Cushing and Christopher Lee.

== Early life ==
Urquhart was born in Ullapool, Scotland. His father was a sailor with the Merchant Navy. He was educated at George Heriot's School in Edinburgh.

After school, he entered the Merchant Navy and went to Australia, New Zealand, South America, and South Africa as an apprentice before earning third mate's papers. He continued his service during World War II. In 1942, he left the Merchant Navy after his ship was torpedoed three times and worked in Glasgow's docklands.

He won an ex-serviceman's scholarship that allowed him to train at Royal Academy of Dramatic Art.

== Career ==
=== Stage ===
Urquhart made his stage debut in 1947 at the Park Theatre in Glasgow, Scotland. That same year, he was cast in Tyrone Guthrie's production of The Thrie Estaitis for the 1st Edinburgh Festival. This led to a season with the Royal Shakespeare Company in 1948, performing Hamlet, King John, Othello, The Taming of the Shrew, Troilus and Cressida, and The Winter’s Tale. Next, he did repertory work in Edinburgh at the Little Rep and in Glasgow at the Citizen's Theatre.

In 1950, he made his West End debut with the role of Captain Hugh Ardale in The Second Mrs Tanqueray at the Theatre Royal Haymarket. He also played Horatio in Hamlet at the West End's New Theatre (now the Noël Coward Theatre), with Alec Guinness in the title role.

He returned to the stage in 1953 with The Merchant of Venice at The Old Vic in London. In 1957, he performed in Restless Heart at St. James's Theatre in London and the Theatre Royal, Brighton. This was followed by a six-month run of Speaking of Murder at St. Martin's Theatre in London's West End in 1958. He appeared in Agatha Christie's Go Back for Murder at the Duchess Theatre in 1960. From 24 April 1965 to 16 July 1966, he was in the cast of Half a Sixpence, a comic musical, at the Broadhurst Theatre on Broadway.

He returned to the stage in 1982, as Friedrich Wilhelm in the National Theatres production of The Prince of Homburg at the Cottesloe Theatre (now Dorfman Theatre) of the Royal National Theatre in London. In 1982, he was again cast in The Thrie Estaitis for the 36th Edinburgh International Film Festival. He also played the role of Father Dolan, in The Shaughraun at the Olivier Theatre of the Royal National Theatre from April 1988 to January 1990.

Year	Title	Role	Company	Director	Notes
1982	Ane Satyre of the Thrie Estaites	Divine Correction	Scottish Theatre Company	Tom Fleming	play by Sir David Lyndsay, adapted by Robert Kemp

=== Film ===
His first film role was in You're Only Young Twice in 1952. That same year, he was also in the films Tread Softly, Paul Temple Returns, and Isn't Life Wonderful. He then secured a contract with Associated British Picture Corporation, making films such as Knights of the Round Table (1953), Happy Ever After (1954), The Curse of Frankenstein (1957) Yangtse Incident (1957), The Bulldog Breed (1960), 55 Days at Peking (1963), Mosquito Squadron (1969), and The Looking Glass War (1970).

Late in his career, he had various roles in films, including Restless Natives (1985), Man on the Screen (1987), The Long Roads (1993), and Master of the Moor (1994).

=== Television ===
In the 1960s, Urquhart appeared in many television shows of the detective/special-agent genre, such as Department S, Callan, The Professionals, Man in a Suitcase, The Saint, and The Avengers. He also played the lead role and served as script editor in Jango, a short lived 1961 production by Associated Rediffusion. He played opposite Patrick McGoohan in the episodes of Danger Man in 1966.

Urquhart also starred as Wing Commander MacPhearson in the 1970s series Pathfinders. He played a drunken journalist in the television movie The Reporters which was shown on Play for Today in 1972. His other made–for–television films included The Inheritors in 1973 and The Aweful Mr. Goodall in 1974. In 1978, he played teacher George Jenkins in a television adaptation of The Prime of Miss Jean Brodie. He acted in "Children of the Full Moon", an episode of Hammer House of Horror in 1980.

In 1982, he had the role Quartering Commandant in the television series Brideshead Revisited. The next year, he played Tom Stockman in Henrik Ibsen's An Enemy of the People and the series The Old Men at the Zoo. He also had roles in the television films P'Tang Yang Kipperbang in 1982 and Sharma and Beyond in 1984. In 1994, he was cast in an episode of The Ruth Rendell Mysteries.

== Personal life ==
He was married twice, first to the actress Zena Walker, and then to the Scottish hotelier and politician Jean Urquhart. He had two sons and two daughters. After the filming of The Curse of Frankenstein, Urquhart adopted the dog that was "resurrected" in the movie.

He spent much of his later years in the Scottish Highlands. In 1970, he turned the boat shed attached to his childhood home in Ullapool into a coffee shop called Ceilidh Place. Adding the house and the house next door, they expanded the venture into a hotel, arts centre and concert hall, which he managed with his wife, Jean.

== Death ==
In 1995, he died in a hospital in Edinburgh shortly after his second heart-bypass operation at the age of 72.

== Selected filmography ==
- You're Only Young Twice (1952) – Sheltie
- Paul Temple Returns (1952) – Slater
- Tread Softly (1952) – Clifford Brett
- The House of the Arrow (1953) – Jim Frobisher
- Knights of the Round Table (1953) – Gawaine
- Golden Ivory (1954) – Jim Dobson
- Happy Ever After (1954) – Dr. Michael Flynn
- Isn't Life Wonderful! (1954) – Frank
- The Dark Avenger (1955) – Sir Philip
- You Can't Escape (1956) – Peter Darwin
- Yangtse Incident: The Story of H.M.S. Amethyst (1957) – Flt Lt Fearnley RAF
- The Curse of Frankenstein (1957) – Paul Krempe
- Dunkirk (1958) – Mike
- Trouble with Eve (1960) – Bryan Maitland
- Danger Tomorrow (1960) – Bob Murray
- Foxhole in Cairo (1960) – Major Wilson
- The Bulldog Breed (1960) – Cmdr. Clayton
- 55 Days at Peking (1963) – Capt. Hanley
- Murder at the Gallop (1963) – George Crossfield
- The Syndicate (1968) – George Brant
- The Limbo Line (1968) – Edward Hardwick
- Mosquito Squadron (1969) – Major Kemble (uncredited)
- The Looking Glass War (1970) – Johnson
- Country Dance (1970) – Auctioneer
- Gator (1976) – 3rd Agent
- An Enemy of the People (1980) – Tom Stockman
- A Tale of Two Cities (1980) – Attorney General
- The Dogs of War (1980) – Capt. Lockhart
- The Dollar Bottom (1981) – Headmaster
- P'tang, Yang, Kipperbang (1982) – Headmaster
- Bleak House (1985) – Laurence Boythorn
- Restless Natives (1985) – Baird
- Playing Away (1987) – Godfrey
- The Kitchen Toto (1987) – D.C. McKinnon
- Testimony (1987) – The Journalist
