= Girl in the Headlines =

1963 British film by Michael Truman

- Directed by: Michael Truman
- Written by: Patrick Campbell; Vivienne Knight
- Based on: The Nose on My Face by Laurence Payne
- Produced by: John Davis
- Starring: Ian Hendry; Ronald Fraser; Jeremy Brett; Jane Asher
- Cinematography: Stanley Pavey
- Edited by: Frederick Wilson
- Music by: John Addison
- Production company: Viewfinder Films Ltd.
- Distributed by: Bryanston Films
- Release dates: 15 November 1963 (London, UK)
- Running time: 94 minutes
- Country: United Kingdom
- Language: English
- Budget: £130,000

Girl in the Headlines (also known as The Model Girl Murder Case) is a 1963 British detective film directed by Michael Truman and starring Ian Hendry, Ronald Fraser, Jeremy Brett, and Jane Asher. It was written by Patrick Campbell and Vivienne Knight based on the 1961 novel The Nose on my Face by Laurence Payne.

== Plot ==
Chief Inspector Birkett and Sergeant Saunders are called in to investigate the murder of a glamorous model. It becomes apparent that the girl had led a chequered life and her acquaintances included drug dealers. Jordan and Hammond Barker are reluctant to help but when the police finally make an arrest, another murder occurs in a seedy Soho jazz café. But are the two murders connected?

== Cast ==
- Ian Hendry as Inspector Birkett
- Ronald Fraser as Sergeant Saunders
- Margaret Johnston as Mrs Edith Gray
- Natasha Parry as Perlita Barker
- Jeremy Brett as Jordan Barker
- Kieron Moore as Herter
- Peter Arne as Hammond Barker
- Jane Asher as Lindy Birkett
- Rosalie Crutchley as Maude Klein
- Robert Harris as William Lamotte
- Duncan Macrae as Barney
- Zena Walker as Mildred Birkett
- James Villiers as David Dane
- Alan White as Inspector Blackwell
- Martin Boddey as Inspector
- Marie Burke as Madame Lavalle
- Patrick Holt as Walbrook
- Douglas Muir as fingerprint expert

== Critical reception ==
The Monthly Film Bulletin wrote: "An unexpected pleasure is the manner in which this film takes a routine whodunnit Scotland Yard investigation and turns it into positively good, sometimes charming and, in the end, suspenseful entertainment. Its success is due to its good script, the unusually agreeable characterisation of the two investigators, a nice vein of humour (some of the best lines are almost thrown away, so inconsequentially are they delivered), the contrast provided by the Inspector's domestic life (not overdone as is so often the case), and a generally high level of acting. Effectively directed by Michael Truman, it may not aim very high, but it aims."

The New Statesman called the film a "with-it British thriller about a murdered high-living whore. Who did it is kept in sprightly abeyance ... Patrick Campbell and Vivienne Knight wrote the script, which embraces a scrubby queer club and a copper who digs opera. In a finely selected cast everyone shines."

Variety called the film “A crisp, well made whodunit, with plenty red herrings to keep an audience guessing. Neither the screenplay nor Michael Truman's direction call for undue histrionics. Result is that the cops look, talk and behave like cops and the varied suspects, though mainly larger than life, are completely credible types."

Leslie Halliwell wrote: "Standard police mystery, well enough done."

The Radio Times Guide to Films gave the film 3/5 stars, writing: "This sleazy whodunnit could have been compiled from a random leaf through the Sunday scandal sheets. At times it seems as if every known vice has been woven into the labyrinthine plot, which centres on the efforts of cop lan Hendry to prise clues to the identity of a model's killer out of her friends and family. Hendry's commitment and the Watsonesque support of his sergeant (Ronald Fraser) keep you curious."
