= Supernatural (British TV series) =

1977 British Gothic horror television anthology series

- Genre: Gothic, horror
- Created by: Robert Muller
- Theme music composer: Paul Lewis
- Country of origin: United Kingdom
- Original language: English
- No. of series: 1
- No. of episodes: 8

Production
- Producer: Pieter Rogers
- Running time: 50 minutes
- Production company: BBC

Original release
- Network: BBC1
- Release: 11 June – 6 August 1977

Supernatural is a British Gothic horror anthology television series that was produced by the BBC in 1977. The series consisted of eight episodes and was broadcast on BBC1. In each episode, a prospective member of the "Club of the Damned" was required to tell a horror story, and their application for membership would be judged on how frightening the story was. Applicants who failed to tell a sufficiently frightening story would be killed.

== Overview ==
Series creator Robert Muller, who also wrote seven of the eight screenplays, said: "The idea was to tell the kind of Gothic tale that we don't have on television, something akin to the old horror films of the 1920s and 1930s. What we get now are thrillers set in modern times with lots of blood and violence. There is no blood and no violence in this series. They are tales about ghosts, vampires, werewolves, that sort of thing. Highly romantic and highly charged with fear and menace."

Although each episode was a stand-alone story, episodes 2 and 3 shared a cast and linked plot. These two episodes starred English actress Billie Whitelaw, who was married to Muller. She said: "Robert wrote the story with me in mind, but I said I would not read it until it was sent to me by a producer or director. I wanted the thing kept on a professional footing. During rehearsals we never discussed the play at home, and in the rehearsal room I would never address Robert directly if I had any query or suggestion. I would always go through the director."

Vladek Sheybal won the Dracula Society's prestigious Hamilton Deane Award for the best dramatic performance or presentation in the Gothic horror/supernatural genres for his performance in "Night of the Marionettes". Sheybal played "Herr Hubert", an Austrian innkeeper with life-size puppets in a story based around Mary Shelley's Frankenstein.

Overall, Supernatural received a mixed response from audiences and low ratings, most likely due to its summertime transmission despite being a gothic horror show featuring mythic monsters and death. It ended after one series.

In 2014, episodes 6-8 were repeated for the Halloween season on BBC Four.

== Episode list ==
#	Title	First transmission (UK)	Director	Writer	Designer	Cast notes
1	"Ghosts of Venice"	11 June 1977 10:10 p.m.	Claude Whatham	Robert Muller	Allan Anson	Robert Hardy (Adrian Gall); Sinéad Cusack (Leonora); Isabel Dean (Charlotte Gall); Lee Montague (Prefect of Police)
2	"Countess Ilona"	18 June 1977 9:55 p.m.	Simon Langton	Robert Muller	Allan Anson	Billie Whitelaw (Countess Ilona); Ian Hendry (Zoltan Vinzenz); John Fraser (Hugo Hoffman); Charles Kay (Dr. Felix Kraus); Sandor Eles ('He'); Charles Keating (Andras); Amanda Boxer (Magda)
3	"The Werewolf Reunion"	25 June 1977 9:55 p.m.	Simon Langton	Robert Muller	Allan Anson	Billie Whitelaw (Countess Ilona); Ian Hendry (Zoltan Vinzenz); John Fraser (Hugo Hoffman); Charles Kay (Dr. Felix Kraus); Edward Hardwicke (Baron Josef von Haller); Sandor Eles ('He'); Charles Keating (Andras); Amanda Boxer (Magda)
4	"Mr. Nightingale"	2 July 1977 9:50 p.m.	Alan Cooke	Robert Muller	Barbara Gosnold	Jeremy Brett (Mr. Nightingale); Lesley-Anne Down (Felizitas); Susan Maudslay (Elyse); Bruce Purchase (Herr Steekeback); Mary Law (Frau Steekeback); Donald Eccles (Frau Steekeback's father); Sylvia Coleridge (Herr Steekeback's mother); André van Gyseghem (Sir Francis)
5	"Lady Sybil"	9 July 1977 10:00 p.m.	Simon Langton	Robert Muller	Michael Young	Denholm Elliott (Geoffrey Manners); John Osborne (Edward Manners); Cathleen Nesbitt (Lady Sybil Manners); Norma West (Madge); Roger Sloman (Sergeant Cosley); André van Gyseghem (Sir Francis); Leslie French (Mr. Medina)
6	"Viktoria"	16 July 1977 9:40 p.m.	Peter Sasdy	Sue Lake	Allan Anson	Catherine Schell (Theresa Strickland); Judy Cornwell (Margaret Graham); Lewis Fiander (Paul Strickland); Esmond Knight (Sir Charles); Mia Nadasi (Elizabeth Strickland/Viktoria); Norman Eshley (Edward); Susan Richards (Kati); Genevieve West (Young Viktoria); Gilda Cohen (Rosa)
7	"Night of the Marionettes"	30 July 1977 9:55 p.m.	Alan Cooke	Robert Muller	Allan Anson	Gordon Jackson (Howard Lawrence); Kathleen Byron (Elsbeth Lawrence); Vladek Sheybal (Herr Hubert); Pauline Moran (Mary Lawrence); Sydney Bromley (Otto); André van Gyseghem (Sir Francis)
8	"Dorabella"	6 August 1977 9:45 p.m.	Simon Langton	Robert Muller	Barbara Gosnold	Jeremy Clyde (Walter Von Lamont); David Robb (Philip Hambleton); Ania Marson (Dorabella); John Justin (Dorabella's father); Esmond Knight (Sir Charles); Jonathan Hyde (Amadeus); Nicholas McArdle (Landlord); Sheila Gill (The Young Girl's Mother); Michael Miller (The Young Girl's Father)

== DVD release ==
Supernatural was released on 18 November 2013 as part of the British Film Institute's Gothic: The Dark Heart of Film celebration. The 2-disc set contains four episodes on each disc, presented in the original transmission order.

== Companion book ==
A companion book, Supernatural: Haunting Stories of Gothic Terror, was published to coincide with the series, with each screenplay adapted as a short story. The cover of the first edition comprised a photograph of Whitelaw taken during the production of "Countess Ilona" and the tag-line "Now on BBC-TV." The adaptations are:

Title	Corresponding TV episode	Adapted by
Dorabella, or In Love with Death	"Dorabella"	Rosemary Timperley
Lady Sybil, or The Phantom of Black Gables	"Lady Sybil"	Mary Danby
Heirs, or The Workshop of Filthy Creation	"Night of the Marionettes"	Brian Hayles
Countess Ilona, or The Werewolf Reunion	"Countess Ilona" & "The Werewolf Reunion"	Roger Malisson
Viktoria, or The Hungarian Doll	"Viktoria"	Sue Lake
Mr Nightingale, or Burning Masts	"Mr Nightingale"	Robert Muller
Gall, or Ghost of Venice	"Ghosts of Venice"	Rosemary Timperley
