= The Adventures of Don Quick =

1970 British TV sci-fi series

- Genre: Science fiction Sitcom
- Starring: Ian Hendry; Ronald Lacey
- Country of origin: United Kingdom
- Original language: English
- No. of series: 1
- No. of episodes: 6 (5 missing)

Production
- Running time: 50 minutes
- Production company: London Weekend

Original release
- Network: ITV
- Release: 30 October – 4 December 1970

The Adventures of Don Quick is a science fiction comedy television series that ran from October to December 1970, on ITV. Starring Ian Hendry and Ronald Lacey, six 50 minute episodes were made, shown in a 60-minute time slot. As of 2008, only the first episode exists, the other five are now missing. A 30 foot model spaceship was built in the studio for the series.

== Plot summary ==
The show was a science fiction satire based on the characters of Don Quixote, with astronaut Captain Don Quick (Ian Hendry) and Sergeant Sam Czopanser (i.e. "Sancho Panza") (Ronald Lacey), members of the "Intergalactic Maintenance Squad". On each planet they visit, Quick attempts to set right imaginary wrongs, often upsetting the inhabitants of whatever society he is in. The plot bears some resemblance to the five Penton and Blake stories by John W Campbell, about two astronauts who travel the Solar System meeting strange races.

== Episode listing and broadcast variations ==
No.	Title	Original release date
1	"The Benefits of Earth"	30 October 1970
2	"People Isn't Everything"	6 November 1970
3	"The Higher the Fewer"	13 November 1970
4	"The Love Reflector"	20 November 1970
5	"The Quick and the Dead"	27 November 1970
6	"Paradise Destruct"	4 December 1970

With the exception of HTV and Southern, all ITV regions showed all six episodes on Fridays between 30 October and 4 December 1970. LWT and most other regions screened the episodes at 21:00, with the following variations:

- Grampian: #1 at 21:00, #3 at 22:00, #4 & 5 at 22:30, #6 at 23:00
- ATV: #1 at 21:00, #2-6 at 22:30

Southern screen the first episode in the same timeslot as all the other regions bar HTV, then dropped the series completely.

HTV screened all six episodes on Saturdays between 31 October and 5 December 1970, all at 22:10 with the exception of #6 at 23:10.

== The episodes ==
1. "The Benefits of Earth". The pair land on a planet with two extremely different races. One is technologically advanced and is warlike, addicted to human sacrifices. The others are beings of peace and sensitively, living in a dream world. Quick decides to reform them. Kevin Stoney as Betuchuk, Anouska Hempel as Marvana, Thorley Walters as Chief Dreamer, John Woodnutt as Goolmarg, Donald Sumpter as Gezool. Written by Peter Wildeblood.
2. "People Isn’t Everything". The pair land on the planet Ophiuchus and leave their rocket in the care of a robot who unfortunately likes to drink. Tony Bateman as Skip, Kate O'Mara as Peleen, Colin Baker as Rebel. Written by Kenneth Hill.
3. "The Higher The Fewer". The pair land on Melkion 5 where the population live in 2,000 storey high skyscrapers. The upper floors are for the upper classes and the lower floors for the lower classes. Quick decides to change all of that with disastrous results. James Hayter as Hendenno, Hildegard Neil as Mrs Arborel, Derek Francis as Arborel. Written by Peter Wildeblood.
4. "The Love Reflector". A planet populated only by beautiful women but the planet holds hidden dangers as an astronaut who landed there a generation ago proves, as he is now only six inches tall. Liz Bamber as Angeline, Madeline Smith as Leonie, Faith Brook as Queen Bee. Written by Keith Miles.
5. "The Quick and The Dead". The pair accidentally land their rocket in a live volcano crater and Sam is convinced he is dead and this is the afterlife. They meet an assortment of gods who unknown to them have made them immune to the heat so they can survive, so Quick thinks the volcano is not real. Patricia Haines as Aphrodite, Pauline Jameson as Hera, Graham Crowden as Zeus, Arthur Brough as Odin. Written by Keith Miles.
6. "Paradise Destruct". The planet has many beautiful people and lush vegetation. Night and winter have been abolished in this paradise but Quick decides to change a thing or two with bad results. Kara Wilson as Jonquil, Lorna Heilbron as Willow, Roy Marsden as Sycamore. Written by Charlotte and Dennis Plimmer.

Unproduced episodes include 'It Was Such a Nice Little Planet' by Angela Carter. A copy of her script is held in the British Library Manuscript Collection.
