= The Mallens =

British television series (1979–1980)

- Genre: Drama
- Country of origin: United Kingdom
- Original language: English
- No. of episodes: 13

Production
- Producer: Granada Television

Original release
- Network: ITV
- Release: 10 June 1979 – 3 July 1980

The Mallens is a Granada Television adaptation of Catherine Cookson novels that ran for thirteen episodes from 10 June 1979 to 3 July 1980. The series is based on The Mallen Streak, The Mallen Girls, The Mallen Secret, and The Mallen Curse.

== Plot summary ==
=== The Mallen Streak ===
The pivotal character is a ruthless 19th-century Northumberland squire, Thomas Mallen (played by John Hallam) of High Banks Hall, who has a genetic white streak (poliosis) in his hair and fathers numerous illegitimate children, all of whom inherit the white streak and live disastrous lives. One of them is Donald Radlet (John Duttine), who appears in both The Mallen Streak and The Mallen Girls. Thomas Mallen, penniless, mortgages his farming estate to make ends meet; he attempts to get his only legitimate son, Richard Mallen (David Rintoul) married to Fanny Armstrong, an unattractive girl with a wealthy father; her dowry would save Richard and Thomas from losing their large house and property. However, the plan fails due to a servant unintentionally revealing that Richard was only marrying Fanny for her money and that he didn't like her, and Richard loses his temper. In the process, he shoots and kills a visiting bailiff, causing Thomas Mallen to be declared bankrupt and to lose everything. This forces Thomas to move into a small cottage with his late wife's nieces, Barbara (Pippa Guard) and Constance (Julia Chambers), and their governess, Anna Brigmore (Caroline Blakiston), who starts an affair with the now bankrupt squire. Sometime after this, Donald and his half-brother, Matthew Radlet (Ian Saynor), come to the cottage to visit Donald's father. Their mother, whom Thomas raped to conceive Donald, is now married to Matthew's father, a stern farmer. Donald and Matthew take a romantic interest in Barbara and Constance. While Donald is courting Barbara, he is also secretly trying to take Constance away from Matthew, who is in love with her. His parents do not wish either brother to marry, since Matthew is consumptive and the family farm is not prosperous enough to support extra family members. Donald eventually wins Constance and leaves Matthew and Barbara in the lurch.

=== The Mallen Girls ===
In The Mallen Girls, Matthew and Constance are secretly meeting and on one occasion, sleep together. Constance says they should get married, but Matthew refuses, fearing his brother and his own consumption. He tells her to say yes if Donald should make a marriage proposal, but she refuses. Miss Brigmore, realizing what has happened, persuades Constance to marry Donald in fear of Constance being pregnant. She marries Donald and later gives birth to a son named Michael. Meanwhile, Thomas Mallen, still with Brigmore, starts turning to drink and sleeping with other women. Eventually, one night, he mistakes his niece Barbara for someone else, rapes her, realizes what he has done, and commits suicide. Sometime after this, it is revealed that Barbara is pregnant with her uncle's child. Months later, Barbara dies while giving birth to a daughter, who is also named Barbara. Donald comes to take the child so that he can lay claim to her inheritance from her half-brother Richard, who died in Paris and left money to his cousin, the elder Barbara, which now belongs to her daughter. Donald hopes that by establishing a claim to the money, he will be able to buy a farm from the new owner of High Banks Hall, Mr Bensham, a Manchester industrialist, for whom Miss Brigmore is now working as a governess. Miss Brigmore refuses to hand over Barbara, realizing that Donald does not care for the child. Donald refuses to listen and says that the child is now his. When Donald goes to the cottage to pick up Barbara, Matthew comes along. After a last attempt to change his half brother's mind, Matthew wrestles with Donald, causing them both to fall from their cart down a steep bank and die.

=== The Mallen Secret ===
Taking place several years later, with Barbara's daughter Barbara and Constance's son Michael now grown up, The Mallen Secret begins with Barbara (Juliet Stevenson) unaware of her true parentage. This is caused in part due to being deaf and partly because she is shielded by her guardian, Miss Brigmore. Miss Brigmore is still governess at High Banks Hall, where the Bensham children (who call her "the Brigadier", not always affectionately) are also grown up. Mrs Bensham is terminally ill and soon dies. Barbara encounters Michael Radlet (Gerry Sundquist), who is also unaware of his true parentage, at a St Valentine's Day dance. His mother, Constance (now played by June Ritchie), has made him believe he is Donald Radlet's son. He and Barbara soon develop feelings for one another. Miss Brigmore and Constance manage to end their developing relationship by telling their children the truth about Barbara's parentage. Miss Brigmore wishes Barbara to marry Mr Bensham's son John so that Barbara can return to High Banks Hall as its mistress. However, neither John nor Barbara is keen on the match, and John becomes engaged to someone else. Miss Brigmore's angry reaction to this news alerts Bensham to the depths of her ambition and leads to a temporary breakdown in their previously friendly relationship. Meanwhile, Constance is courted by Patrick Ferrier, the son of a local baronet whom she knew when she was at High Banks Hall, who has recently returned from India. He loses interest when he discovers that Constance is not the owner of Wolfborough Farm, which was left to Michael, not Constance, when Matthew and Donald died. Ferrier subsequently transfers his attention to the Benshams' daughter Kate, even though he is much older than she. Ignoring the attentions of the Benshams' other son Dan, Barbara persists in pursuing Michael, having now learned from Miss Brigmore's maid Mary Peel that Donald was not Michael's father, so there is no incestuous barrier to their marriage. When she thinks that Michael is attracted to Sarah, one of the farm servants, Barbara attacks Sarah, causing her to lose her leg, and Sarah's brother Jim, in turn, beats Barbara, causing her to regain her hearing suddenly. Barbara tells Michael the truth about his parentage, but he does not believe her, and the two separate angrily.

=== The Mallen Curse ===
This segment continues the story immediately after the final events of The Mallen Secret. Barbara runs away following her row with Michael, but a search party led by Dan Bensham finds her and takes her back to the cottage, where she lapses into a catatonic state. Miss Brigmore moves into the cottage to look after Mary Peel. Meanwhile, Michael agrees to marry Sarah to prevent Jim, her brother, from having Barbara prosecuted. In due course, Sarah is well enough for the marriage to take place, and it is initially happy. When Dan returns from a trip to Paris, he calls on Barbara; she finds out that Michael is married and agrees to marry Dan; they go to France. Mr Bensham proposes to Miss Brigmore, and she is finally installed as mistress of High Banks Hall. But when Barbara and Dan return from Paris, Barbara meets Michael at Mary Peel's funeral, and they begin meeting secretly at the cottage. Dan and Mr Bensham realize something is wrong, but Mrs Bensham is oblivious. Barbara refuses to go to live in Newcastle with Dan. Meanwhile, Kate marries Ferrier, now Sir Patrick, when he renews his proposal. Mr Bensham follows Barbara to the cottage and sees her with Michael, but has a stroke while returning to High Banks Hall. Before he dies, he convinces his wife that Barbara is unfaithful to Dan, and though Anna decides not to tell Dan, she tries to force Barbara to go to Newcastle by refusing Barbara permission to stay at the Hall. Michael's family has also found out about the affair, but Michael decides not to leave them and tries to end his experience with Barbara. On his way to fetch a doctor when Sarah goes into labour, Michael meets Barbara, and though he tries to ride on, she forces him to stop by wading into a river. He tries to stop her, and both are drowned, leaving Mrs Bensham and Constance to rue the terrible consequences of their decisions years earlier.

== Differences between the series and the novels ==
- The ending to the series is considerably different. Barbara and Michael both go on to have their children.
- At the beginning of the novels, Donald and Matthew are 13 and 11 years old, respectively, Constance is 7 years old, and Barbara is 10 years old.
