= Philippa Gail =

British actress (1942–1999)

- in This Is My Street (1964)
- Born: 16 August 1942; Bishop's Stortford, Hertfordshire, England
- Died: 26 July 1999 (aged 56); Dorset, England
- Other name: Philippa J. Gordge
- Occupations: Theatre actress film actress television actress
- Years active: 1963–1992

Philippa Gail (16 August 1942 – 26 July 1999) was a British theatre, film and television actress. The Guardian called her "An actress of power and passion who mingled sex appeal with forthright emotion."

She trained at Webber-Douglas, where she won the award for best actress. There followed stage work including Shakespeare, Shaw and Ostrovsky. In the West End she was Maria in Twelfth Night, and the General's daughter in Anouilh's The Fighting Cock at the Duke of York's. At the Assembly Rooms in York, her performance in Ibsen's Little Eyolf was described by critics as "genuinely revelatory."

In 1970 she married David Conville, director of the Open Air Theatre, Regents Park, where she made many of her later stage appearances. The couple later had a son.

Interspersed amongst her stage work were film and TV parts, including starring as the seductive Jane in The Troubleshooters, This Is My Street, Man in a Suitcase, the title role in William Douglas Home's The Reluctant Debutante (ITV Play of the Week), Giants On Saturday, Triangle, Brett, Coronation Street, The Sweeney and the Ruth Rendell thriller A Fatal Inversion.

Gail also taught drama at the Eugene O'Neill Centre and South Florida University, and continued to appear on stage before retiring in 1996.

She died of cancer in 1999.

== Filmography ==
=== Film ===
Year	Title	Role	Notes
1964	This Is My Street	Maureen	
1969	Ring of Bright Water	Pet stall girl	
1971	She'll Follow You Anywhere	June Carter	AKA, Passion Potion

=== Television ===
Year	Title	Role	Notes
1963	24-Hour Call	Eileen Healey	"Never Leave Me"
1963	Jezebel ex UK	Eileen	"Sister Ship", "The Long Cool Drop"
1963	Maupassant	Jeannie	"Bachelors"
1965	The Villains	Sylvia Greenwood	"Sonny"
1965	Riviera Police	Helen	"But the Company She Keeps/Death on a Fine Day"
1965	ITV Play of the Week	Trudie / Lyn	"Giants on Saturday", "Four of Hearts #4: Summertime Ends Tonight"
1965–1971	The Troubleshooters	Jane Webb	Regular role
1966	ITV Play of the Week	Jane Broadbent	"The Reluctant Debutante"
1966	The Fighting Cock	Sophie	TV film
1967	Trapped	Nina	"Victor Victor"
1967	Sexton Blake	Carole Vane	"Knave of Diamonds: Parts 1–5"
1968	Man in a Suitcase	Patricia Baldwin	"No Friend of Mine"
1968	Love Story	Charlotte	"A Man Alone"
1968	The Jazz Age	Cherry Buck	"Thark"
1968	Coronation Street	Jo Hepworth	"1.831"
1969	Dixon of Dock Green	Penny	"The Brimstone Man"
1969	ITV Sunday Night Theatre	Maggie	"It Calls for a Great Deal of Love"
1971	Brett	Maria	"The Saxby Route"
1978	The Sweeney	D.C.I. Barton	"Feet of Clay"
1990	The Bill	Mrs. Smith	"Breaking Point"
1991	Screen Two	Rose Alderney	"Do Not Disturb"
1992	A Fatal Inversion	Beryl Verne-Smith	"1.1"
