= Ursula Hirst =

British character actress (1909–2002)

Ursula Hirst-Sheron (23 February 1909 – 30 October 2002) was a British character actress.

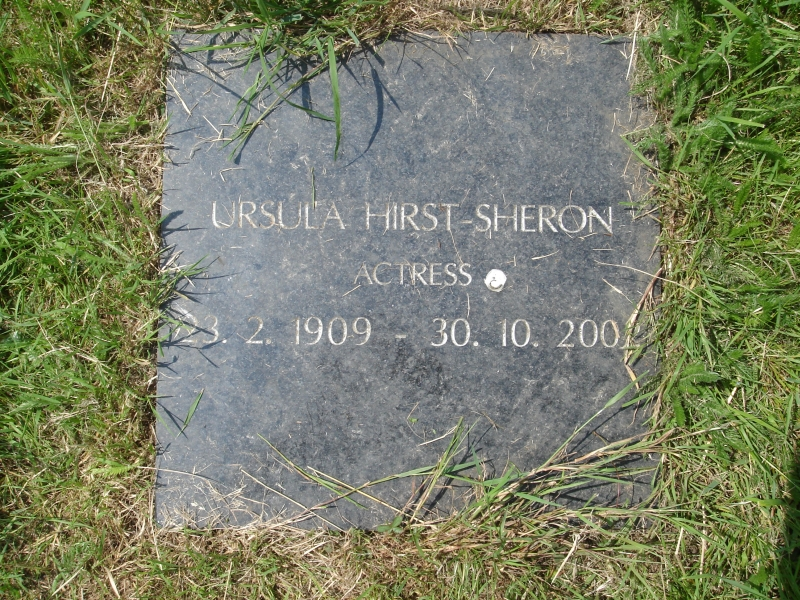
Gravestone, Brompton Cemetery, London

She was born in London, England.

She died in 2002 and is buried in Brompton Cemetery, London

== Selected filmography ==
- It's in the Bag (1936)
- Please Turn Over (1959)
- This Is My Street (1964)

== Selected stage ==
- The Constant Nymph (1926) (New Theatre)
- Admirals All (1934) (Cambridge Theatre)
- See How They Run (1944) (Q Theatre/Comedy Theatre)
