= Never a Cross Word =

1968 British TV sitcom

- Genre: Sitcom
- Written by: Donald Churchill; Michael Pertwee
- Directed by: David Askey; Stuart Allen
- Starring: Paul Daneman; Nyree Dawn Porter; Barbara Murray
- Composer: Stanley Myers
- Country of origin: United Kingdom
- Original language: English
- No. of series: 2
- No. of episodes: 13

Production
- Producers: David Askey; Stuart Allen
- Running time: 40 minutes (series 1) 30 minutes (series 2)
- Production company: London Weekend Television

Original release
- Network: ITV
- Release: 10 August 1968 – 31 January 1970

Never a Cross Word is a British television sitcom which aired on ITV. It was originally broadcast in two series between 10 August 1968 and 31 January 1970. It was one of several comedies produced by the newly-formed London Weekend Television along with On the Buses and Please Sir!.

== Main cast ==
- Paul Daneman as Ronald Baldock (13 episodes, both series)
- Barbara Murray as Deirdre Baldock (7 episodes, series 2)
- Nyree Dawn Porter as Deirdre Baldock (6 episodes, series 1)

In addition numerous actors appeared in episodes of the show including James Beck, Lana Morris, Hattie Jacques, June Whitfield, John Alderton, Sam Kydd, Anthony Dawes, Joan Benham, Kate O'Mara, Charlotte Mitchell, Jack Watling, Margaret Courtenay and Chris Sandford.

== Bibliography ==
- Barry, David. Please Sir! The Official History. Andrews UK Limited, 2020.
- Potter, Jeremy. Independent Television in Britain: Volume 4: Companies and Programmes, 1968–80. Springer, 2016.
