= The World Ten Times Over =

1963 British film by Wolf Rilla

- British film poster
- Directed by: Wolf Rilla
- Written by: Wolf Rilla
- Produced by: Michael Luke
- Starring: Sylvia Syms; Edward Judd; June Ritchie; William Hartnell
- Cinematography: Larry Pizer
- Edited by: Jack Slade
- Music by: Edwin Astley
- Production companies: Associated British Picture Corporation presents A Cyclops Production
- Distributed by: Warner-Pathé Distributors (UK)
- Release dates: 31 October 1963 (London, England)
- Running time: 93 minutes
- Country: United Kingdom
- Language: English
- Budget: £110,036
- Box office: £36,519 (distributor receipt)

The World Ten Times Over (US title Pussycat Alley) is a 1963 British drama film written and directed by Wolf Rilla, and starring Sylvia Syms, June Ritchie, Edward Judd and William Hartnell. The movie premiered a little under a month before Hartnell's debut in Doctor Who. It would also be his final film role. Donald Sutherland makes a brief appearance, in one of his earliest roles. The British Film Institute has described it as the first British film to deal with an implicitly lesbian relationship.

== Plot ==
The lives of two club hostesses Billa and Ginnie, who work in the Soho area of London, have their friendship challenged by jealousies arising when Ginnie becomes romantically involved with Bob, a rich married businessman.

== Cast ==
- Sylvia Syms as Billa (Sybilla)
- Edward Judd as Bob Shelbourne
- June Ritchie as Ginnie (Virginia)
- William Hartnell as Dad
- Sarah Lawson as Elizabeth
- Francis de Wolff as Shelbourne
- Davy Kaye as compère
- Linda Marlowe as Penny
- Jack Gwillim as Bolton
- Kevin Brennan as Brian
- Alan White as Freddy
- Donald Sutherland as club patron
- John Junkin as man in pub

== Production ==
The film marked the debut of Cyclops Productions, a company formed by Wolf Rilla and producer Michael Luke. Finance was provided by Associated British. Filming started in January 1963 and took place on location in London and at Elstree Studios.

== Critical reception ==
The Monthly Film Bulletin wrote: "Wolf Rilla's direction lacks any distinctively personal tone, and the film's stylistic coherence is further weakened by an indulgence in those shock effects and crude linking devices so beloved of British film-makers. The low point of the film is perhaps the climactic night-club sequence, tastelessly conceived and crudely executed, during which the old 'warm-hearted tart' cliché is turned inside out, to unpleasant and implausible effect. The players, handicapped by some inapposite casting, cope as best they severally can with the unmemorable dialogue, but even William Hartnell (made up to look unnervingly like Lord Attlee in his Prime Ministerial days) is unusually ineffective, Sarah Lawson's brief but telling appearance, and Larry Pizer's polished photography, in fact, are the consolations of this further monument to Elstree's evident aspirations towards emulating the 'Free French'."

Variety wrote, "The result is overdramatic but provides opportunities for deft thesping. Nightclub and location sequences in London have a brisk authenticity," the reviewer went on to praise Sylvia Syms' performance, "Her scenes with her father (William Hartnell) are excellent. Hartnell, playing the unworldly, scholarly father, who has no contact with his daughter, also gives an observant study. The other two principals are more phonily drawn characters. Edward Judd seems strangely uneasy in his role and Ritchie, despite many firstrate moments, sometimes appears as if she is simply jumping through paper hoops."

TV Guide gave the film two out of four stars, concluding, "this is a somewhat stylized film, but the story is too depressing to make it work in the long run."

The BFI praised Syms's "moving, melancholic performance."

Filmink said some viewers have "read this as a lesbian love story – maybe it is, but it's definitely a female friendship story, very feminist for its time."
