= For Maddie with Love =

British television drama (1980)

- Genre: Soap opera
- Written by: Douglas Watkinson; Ben Steed; Michael Russell
- Directed by: Dennis Vance
- Starring: Nyree Dawn Porter; Ian Hendry
- Theme music composer: Stephen Francis
- Country of origin: United Kingdom
- Original language: English
- No. of seasons: 2
- No. of episodes: 48

Production
- Executive producer: David Reid
- Producer: Dennis Vance
- Running time: 30 minutes
- Production company: ATV

Original release
- Network: ITV
- Release: May 1 – November 21, 1980

For Maddie with Love is a 1980 British television drama serial dealing with Maddie's discovery that she has a brain tumour and only a few months to live.

This 48-part (30 minute) daytime serial which was in fact live acting was written by Douglas Watkinson was made by ATV and shown on British television beginning in May 1980. Maddie was played by Nyree Dawn Porter and her husband Malcolm by Ian Hendry. Maddie dies during the series, with the subsequent episodes dealing with the family's loss. The series ran over two years from 1980 to 1981 and was published as a novel in 1980 by NEL books. (ATV lost their licence to broadcast in 1981.) It has never been repeated or remade.

Unusually the setting for the drama looked more like that of a theatre piece. Partial sets were used with only the furniture and background items strictly needed for each scene. (Typical was the conservatory which consisted of a few cane chairs, plants, some dividers and Malcolm's painting of Maddie).

It was given a daytime afternoon slot, one for which it was expected to get a mainly female based following.

As it was never shown during peak viewing times it did not become as well known as it might.

== Synopsis ==
Maddie starts to realise that her body is not functioning normally. Although she tries to hide it, eventually her son sees her fall and insists she sees a doctor. She is diagnosed with an inoperable brain tumour. This is the start of the family's journey with Maddie until she eventually dies. The story centres on the interplay between Maddie and her husband Malcolm, examining the illusive and sometimes surreal nature of their relationship. At the same time family problems keep putting demands on Maddie's time and energy. Her daughter Gilly (Sheridan Fitzgerald) is pregnant after having had a miscarriage. Her two sons have the normal but pressing mix of young men's problems. Gordon is the cool solicitor and Neil her youngest at university. We see the family first descend into chaos and then learn to pull together for Maddie's sake. Malcolm cannot accept Maddie's death until one day his children are once again gathered around the dining table and she is not there.

== Cast ==
- Nyree Dawn Porter - Maddie Laurie
- Ian Hendry - Malcolm Laurie
- Sheridan Fitzgerald - Gilly Laurie
- Colin Baker
- Tony Boncza
- John Breslin
- Robert Duncan - Neil Laurie
- Robert Lang
- Bruce Montague
- Paul Whitworth

== Book ==
Published in April 1980 by NEL Books and New English Library. The book was adapted from the television screenplays by Sheila Yegar. The book covers the whole story from when Maddie first suspects that she is ill, through telling her family to her final death. (232 Pages)
