= Sophie Hardy =

French actress

- Born: 4 October 1938 (age 87); Paris, France
- Years active: 1960–

Sophie Hardy is a French actress.

== Filmography ==
Year	Title	Role	Director	Notes
1961	Pitong gabi sa Paris		Eddie Romero	
1962	La loi des hommes		Charles Gérard	
1962	Un clair de lune à Maubeuge	Virginie	Jean Chérasse	
1963	Jeff Gordon, Secret Agent	Claudine	Raoul André	
1963	Hardi Pardaillan!	the travelling young woman	Bernard Borderie	
1964	Der Hexer	Elise	Alfred Vohrer	
1964	La baie du désir	La cousine	Max Pécas	
1964	Cruelle méprise		Jean-Michel Rankovitch	
1964	L'étrange auto-stoppeuse		Jean Darcy	
1965	Three Hats for Lisa	Lisa Milan	Sidney Hayers	
1965	The Desperado Trail (Winnetou III)	Ann	Harald Reinl	
1965	Attack of the Robots	Cynthia Lewis	Jesús Franco	
1966	The Trygon Factor	Sophie	Cyril Frankel	
1970	Taste of Excitement	Michela	Don Sharp	
1971	Road to Salina	Linda	Georges Lautner	
2000	Drug Scenes	Grandmother	Seb Lelouch, Simon Lelouch	
2004	Casablanca Driver	La femme de Coll Murray	Maurice Barthélemy	
