= Laurence Payne =

British actor and writer (1919–2009)

- Born: Laurence Stanley Payne; 5 June 1919; London, England, United Kingdom
- Died: 23 February 2009 (aged 89); London, England, United Kingdom
- Occupations: actor novelist
- Years active: 1946–1992
- Spouse(s): Judith Draper 1974–2009 (his death); Pamela Alan 1955–? (divorced); Sheila Burrell 1944–1951 (divorced)

Laurence Stanley Payne (5 June 1919 – 23 February 2009) was an English actor and novelist.

== Early life ==
Payne was born in London. His father died when he was three years old, and he and his elder brother and sister were brought up by their mother, a Wesleyan Methodist in Wood Green, London. He attended Belmont School and Tottenham Grammar School, leaving at 16 to take a clerical job. After training at the Bristol Old Vic Theatre School in 1939, he was exempted from war service as a conscientious objector on condition that he went on tour with the Old Vic during the war.

== Career ==
=== Actor ===
Payne made his professional debut at the Old Vic theatre in 1939 and remained with the company for several years. He then performed at the Chanticleer and Arts theatres in London, also directing and broadcasting for the first times during this period. At Stratford-on-Avon he played, among other parts, Romeo in Peter Brook's 1947 production.

After more work at London theatres, he played leading roles at the prestigious Bristol Old Vic, and after that rejoined the London Old Vic company. At the Embassy Theatre in London he played Hamlet.

His film credits include: The Trollenberg Terror (aka. The Crawling Eye), Vampire Circus, The Tell-Tale Heart and Ben-Hur. His television credits include: Z-Cars, Moonstrike, Thriller (1 episode, 1974), The Sandbaggers, Airline, Telephone Soup, The Saint (1966) - Episode (S5, E6) and Tales of the Unexpected. See him also as Capulet in a 1976 version of Romeo and Juliet.

He appears in three Doctor Who serials: The Gunfighters, The Leisure Hive and The Two Doctors, playing a different role in each. Perhaps his most famous role was as TV's Sexton Blake (1968–71) on ITV in Britain. It was while filming an episode of Sexton Blake that he lost sight in his left eye during rehearsal of a sword fighting scene with actor Basil Henson, following a hard sword blow against the side of his head. Peter Moffatt took him straight away to Moorfields Eye Hospital, and Payne was told that, if he could lie still for a week without moving his head, his retina would join up again so preserving his sight. Instead of doing this, Payne went back to work, got hit in a fistfight, and so lost his sight in that eye.

=== Writer ===
After retiring from acting, Payne continued to concentrate on writing crime/detective novels. His 1961 novel The Nose on my Face was filmed as Girl in the Headlines (1963). By 1993, he had published 11 novels, and he has been called "one of the great humorists of the world of crime fiction".

== Personal life and death ==
Payne was an enthusiastic oil painter, a self-taught pianist, and a fight director. In later years he worked regularly on radio, but in the 1990s he developed sepsis and there was subsequent brain damage. Suffering from vascular dementia, he spent the last three years of his life in a nursing home near Berwick-upon-Tweed.

== Selected filmography ==
- A Matter of Life and Death (1946) - Prosecuting Counsel (uncredited)
- Train of Events (1949) - Richard (segment "The Prisoner-of-War")
- Glad Tidings (1953) - Clive Askham
- The Face of Love (1954), BBC TV movie adaption of Troilus and Cressida in the leading role as Troilus
- Ill Met by Moonlight (1957) - Manoli
- Dangerous Exile (1957) - Lautrec
- A Tale of Two Cities (1958) - President of Tribunal (uncredited)
- The Trollenberg Terror (1958) - Philip Truscott
- Ben-Hur (1959) - Joseph (uncredited)
- The Tell-Tale Heart (1960) - Edgar Marsh
- The Singer Not the Song (1961) - Pablo
- The Third Alibi (1961) - Norman Martell
- The Queen's Guards (1961) - Farinda
- The Court Martial of Major Keller (1961) - Major Keller
- Barabbas (1961) - Disciple
- Crosstrap (1962) - Duke
- Mystery Submarine (1963) - Lt. Seaton
- A Farewell to Arms (1966) - Lieutenant Rinaldi
- The Saint (1966) - Episode (S5, E6) as Noel Bastion a novelist
- Vampire Circus (1972) - Mueller
- The Message (1976) - Of one major role (voice)
- Romeo and Juliet (1976) (TV) - Capulet
- Lady Killers (1980) - Victor Mishcon

== Bibliography ==
- Late Knight (1987)

Sam Birkett series

- The Nose on My Face (1961)
- Too Small for His Shoes (1962)
- Deep and Crisp and Even (1964)

John Tibett series

- Spy for Sale (1970)
- Even my Foot's Asleep (1971)

Mark Savage series

- Take the Money and Run (1982)
- Malice in Camera (1983)
- Vienna Blood (1984)
- Dead for a Ducat (1986)
- Knight Fall (1987)
