= Two Left Feet (film) =

1963 British film by Roy Ward Baker

- Directed by: Roy Ward Baker
- Written by: Roy Ward Baker; John Hopkins
- Based on: In My Solitude by David Stuart Leslie
- Produced by: Roy Ward Baker; Leslie Gilliat
- Starring: Michael Crawford; Nyree Dawn Porter
- Cinematography: Wilkie Cooper; Harry Gillam
- Edited by: Michael Hark; John Pomeroy
- Music by: Philip Green
- Production company: Roy Ward Baker Productions
- Distributed by: British Lion Film Corporation (UK)
- Release date: March 1963
- Running time: 93 minutes
- Country: United Kingdom
- Language: English

Two Left Feet is a 1963 British comedy-drama film directed by Roy Ward Baker and starring Nyree Dawn Porter, Michael Crawford, David Hemmings and Julia Foster. It is based on David Stuart Leslie's novel In My Solitude (1960).

== Plot ==
Alan, a contractor, and his coworkers stop in at their usual cafe for tea - and to eagerly greet the new waitress, Eileen, working there. All of Alan's work friends begin making inappropriate comments toward her including Alan. She identifies his lack of confidence and begins to pick on him for being thin. Shortly after, rumors begin to spread that Eileen may have taken a liking to Alan though he does not believe it at first. He is discouraged by her wedding ring, but Bill (his boss) assures him it is just "camouflage" to dissuade unwanted advances. With this in mind, Alan asks out Eileen and she surprisingly agrees.

It quickly becomes apparent that the two are not compatible and the date goes disastrously. Eileen is far more interested in Ronnie, another club-goer, much to Alan's chagrin. He tries to dance with another woman to make Eileen jealous but she does not care in the slightest. It is clear that Alan has no interest in Eileen romantically and finds her to be fake, but still pursues her for sex assuming she is still interested. When they get to her door at the end of the date, Alan is shocked to hear that Eileen had no intention of sleeping with him. He criticizes her for leading him on and, in her annoyance with him, she agrees to sex so long as he is quick. Alan resents the notion that sex with him would be something to get over with and he refuses, leaving Eileen at her door.

The next day Alan's coworkers ask how the date went but he remains coy in the hopes they do not realize it was a failure. Bill gets a call to help move the belongings of two sisters (Beth and Angela) who are moving to their great aunts and brings Alan with him to help. Angela cannot stop crying throughout the journey and Beth is the woman Alan danced with at the club earlier.

Alan brings Eileen to the dance club where they run into Ronnie and Brian again, though the two appear to be in a fight over Mavis. Ronnie sees Eileen enter and promptly sweeps her away from Alan once more. Alan blows up at Eileen in the club and, strangely, it appears to be the reaction Eileen was hoping for. They rush back to her place but his attempt to be dominant goes awry when he knocks over a glass, frightening Eileen's dog and waking up the whole neighborhood with its barking. Eileen calls him a baby and he leaves humiliated.

Bill and Alan are called again to move the belongings of the sisters they helped earlier. However, only Beth is returning as Angela is hospitalized following their father's suicide. Later, Alan finds Beth at her department store job and asks her out again. She alludes to the death of her father resulting from a drug overdose and feels that Alan will not want to be seen with her, but he assures her it makes no difference to him.

At the dance club Alan and Beth have a great time. Eileen shows up with Ronnie and entices Alan into fighting again, but the two only exchange insults. The following Saturday the group heads off to a new jazz club's grand opening where Alan learns that Eileen is leaving town. Alan grabs Eileen's hand in surprise and Ronnie sees from a distance. Assuming they are being intimate, Ronnie begins brawling with Alan. Alan insists they stop fighting and talk things through - and he learns that Ronnie is only seventeen years old, younger than Eileen who he believes to be twenty years old, and severely disappointed with his life. Ronnie draws a knife on Alan and he backs out of the conversation entirely.

Much later Alan and Beth are at Brian's wedding and learn that Ronnie has gotten engaged to Eileen. Alan is hung up on this as he thinks their age gap is too wide, and he recalls the wedding ring she used to wear when he was first going out with her. He wonders if maybe Eileen really is already married, which would jeopardize her marriage to Ronnie. In the evening they begin playing a game where single men choose a woman to sit in a chair surrounded by glass bottles on the floor. If they can get to the woman while blindfolded without knocking down the bottles, they can have a kiss. Alan goes first and chooses Beth, though after the blindfold is on, Beth is switched to an older women in attendance. Alan kisses her and takes off his blindfold, laughing at the joke. Ronnie is next and he chooses Eileen. When the older relative stands again to switch seats this time, Brian decides at the last moment to shoo her from the chair and take her seat. Alan realizes this is not a good idea as he knows Ronnie carries a knife, but says nothing to stop it. Ronnie kisses Brian on the mouth and when he removes his blindfold, Ronnie flies into a rage. Before he can pull out his knife, Alan takes it from him, and the two are forced by the surrounding guests to make up so the party can continue civilly.

That night Alan falls asleep on a couch and loses track of Beth. He goes door to door in the house looking for her, but finds Eileen first. She tells him the story of when she was taken advantage of at sixteen years old by her employer - a magician whom she was the assistant of. Alan is sympathetic to her ordeal and kisses her, right as Ronnie arrives and begins punching Alan. The ruckus awakes the whole house and the crowd, now including Beth, realize what has happened. An older relative orders Alan out of the house, humiliating himself and Beth in the process.

The following night Alan goes to his usual cafe, but Ronnie is there with his gang. Ronnie threatens Alan, but Alan pulls out the knife he took from him at the wedding. Alan lays the knife on the table and tries to intimidate Ronnie into putting their grudge to rest. However, Ronnie calls his bluff and has his gang lock the door of the diner and they begin beating Alan together. Eileen happens to be walking by and rushes into the diner to stop Ronnie, and calls off their engagement. Eileen comments to Alan that she knows he does not believe her story about the magician, and she pulls out a newspaper clipping to confirm it was true all along. Alan reads the date and realizes that Eileen is twenty-eight years old - eleven years older than Ronnie.

In the end, Alan returns to the department store to ask for Beth's forgiveness though he does not initially receive it. He waits outside for her shift to be done and asks again, and the two hold hands and they walk.

== Cast ==
- Michael Crawford as Alan Crabbe
- Nyree Dawn Porter as Eileen
- Julia Foster as Beth Crowley
- David Hemmings as Brian
- Bernard Lee as Mr. Crabbe
- David Lodge as Bill
- Michael Craze as Ronnie
- Dilys Watling as Mavis
- Cyril Chamberlain as Miles
- Michael Ripper as Uncle Reg

== Soundtrack ==
Tommy Bruce sings "Two Left Feet" over the opening credits of the film; later Susan Maughan sings "Where Were You When I Needed You?" .

== Release ==
Baker's expectations were high, hoping to attract wide popularity with a young audience, since most of the film's leading players were under 21. In his memoirs he writes: "The cast turned out to be one of the best I've ever had. They were all terrific and the film turned out well." But there were difficulties obtaining a release. None of the actors were stars, the film was given an X Certificate, and it was eventually released on a poorly promoted double bill, after a delay of two years.

Baker called it "A disaster. I fiddled around, tried to make a picture of my own which I did, put money into it. That was a nice little picture, with a wonderful cast... and I was quite pleased with it, but nobody wanted to show it, nobody wanted to see it, we couldn’t get a circuit release and so I went into television."

== Reception ==
Kine Weekly said "Drama of modern teenagers and their love lives, with a strong odour of the kitchen sink. . ... The film is a commercial contradiction, a young romance designed for young audiences and barred to them by the X certificate. The picture fails on nearly all counts. ... It is a pity that such a promising young actor as Michael Crawford. ... should be wasted on such unrewarding toil".

In the New Statesman John Coleman wrote "Hesitantly, though, to be recommended for the vestigial sense of teenage loyalties communicated: anxiety about a mate engaged to a bird who may be well into her twenties, general ganging up as and not necessarily with knives as against the adult scene."

Variety called the film a "flimsy, ill-developed pic concerned with the turbulence of adolescence; disappointing and unlikely to make much of a mark at the box office. ... It is difficult to pin down just what has gone wrong with Two Left Feet, but with the exception of Miss Porter and, occasionally, Crawford, it has the look of a very tired piece of old hattery."

Monthly Film Bulletin said: "The best of this film is comically true to life; ... The plot, like the dialogue, runs into entertaining little byways that lead nowhere, but which do suggest an observation slightly above average."

Leslie Halliwell opined: "Ponderous sex comedy with no apparent purpose but some well observed scenes."
