= Jango (TV series) =

1961 British TV comedy series

- Genre: Comedy
- Created by: Robert Urquhart
- Based on: Murder Stamp (play)
- Written by: Mike Watts, Albert Henry Webb, Peter Ling, Sheilah Ward, Don Matthews
- Directed by: Cyril Coke
- Starring: Robert Urquhart; Moira Redmond
- Country of origin: United Kingdom
- No. of series: 1
- No. of episodes: 8 (7 missing)

Production
- Producer: Cyril Coke
- Running time: 25 Minutes
- Production company: Associated Rediffusion

Original release
- Network: ITV
- Release: 25 January – 22 March 1961

Jango is a British police comedy series produced in 1961 by Associated Rediffusion for ITV. It starred Robert Urquhart in the lead role of Jango Smith, with Moira Redmond as Dee Smith, his wife. The show also featured performances by Peter Sallis and Brian Wilde. The show's writer was Albert Henry Webb and its director was Cyril Coke.

== Plot ==
The eight-episode series Jango developed from single play Murder Stamp. The play Murder Stamp was an episode shown on ITV Television Playhouse in 1960. The series is a lighthearted crime series about an off-beat criminologist named Jango Smith.

== Episode status ==
The show had eight episodes. All of them were believed to be lost, until the mid-1990s when a kinescope of one episode was discovered. The only episode that has survived in the seventh episode titled "Treacle on Three Fingers".

=== Series run (1961) ===
1. "A Little of What She Fancied" (25 January 1961)
2. "Mind the Doors, Please" (1 February 1961)
3. "The Bumbling Burglar" (8 February 1961)
4. "The Itching Fingers of Lady Ffolkes" (15 February 1961)
5. "Great Day for Jango" (1 March 1961)
6. "Seven Swords of Haversham" (8 March 1961)
7. "Treacle on Three Fingers" (15 March 1961)
8. "Champagne for Bee" (22 March 1961)

== Reception ==
The Stage and Television Today criticised the show, writing, "The half-hour needs a dose of good comedy writing to make it work, because at present it is just feeble. A pity that delightful Moira Redmond cannot be featured in a programme of her own. She has an obvious feeling for a piquant comedy role, but cannot really make out with the present material."

The Daily Telegraph said that the series offers a welcome change from the gun-slinging raincoated detectives of the past, noting that it showed that a crime series can be amusing as well as exciting.

The Daily Mirror said that it blossomed onto the ITV screens in a good way.

The Daily Mail said that the main character Jango has the makings of a likeable TV character.

== DVD release ==
TV Brain/Kaleidoscope has released the one surviving episode of the series on DVD from their online DVD shopping website.
