= The Siege of Golden Hill =

1975 British children's television series

- Written by: Nick McCarty
- Directed by: John Sichel
- Starring: Gerry Sundquist; Billy Hamon; Sara Lee
- Country of origin: United Kingdom
- Original language: English
- No. of series: 1
- No. of episodes: 12

Production
- Producer: John Sichel
- Running time: 30 minutes

Original release
- Network: ITV
- Release: 22 June – 7 September 1975

The Siege of Golden Hill is a British children's television series set in a world of teenage gangs and council corruption on the outskirts of a major English city (based on Birmingham). It was produced by ATV Midlands. Twelve episodes of 30 minutes each were broadcast on ITV between June and August 1975. The main parts were played by Gerry Sundquist, Billy Hamon and Sara Lee. The scriptwriter was Nick McCarty and the producer John Sichel.

== Episode titles ==
- Ultimatum
- Threats
- The Frighteners
- Besieged
- New Victims
- Extortion
- Undercover
- Intimidation
- Last Straw
- Nailed
- The Vandals Are Coming
- Bribery
