= The Reluctant Debutante (play) =

1955 play written by William Douglas-Home

The Reluctant Debutante is a 1955 play by the British playwright William Douglas Home.

It was first performed (for a 'try-out' week) at the Theatre Royal Brighton after William Douglas-Home spotted the untrained 17-year-old actress Anna Massey and brought her in to audition for the title role. After she wowed the Brighton audiences the play quickly transferred to the Cambridge Theatre, London on 24 May 1955, where it enjoyed a long run with Wilfrid Hyde-White continuing to play the father and Celia Johnson the neurotic mother, Sheila Broadbent. The production was directed by Jack Minster.

On 30 June 1955 MGM bought the film and stage rights to the play with the aim of taking it to Broadway.

In 1956 the play premièred on Broadway at the Henry Miller's Theatre with a mostly changed cast but still with Anna Massey in the lead and Wilfrid Hyde-White playing her father.

== Plot ==
The plot follows an aristocratic family through one of London's debutante seasons. It is a light-hearted, almost farcical comedy which revolves around the mother's deep anxiety and attempts to avoid scandal after she confuses two men (both called David) and accidentally sets up her daughter with 'David Hoylake-Johnston' (who has a reputation as a philanderer) instead of 'David Bulloch' (whom she believes to be the perfect match for her daughter).

The debutante season was designed for aristocratic parents to find well-connected potential suitors for their daughters by throwing (often very expensive) parties and inviting eligible bachelors. 'Sheila Broadbent', the mother of Jane (the eponymous 'Reluctant Debutante'), is terrified that her daughter will lose the chance to meet a good husband if there is a scandal – i.e. 'David Hoylake-Johnston' charming her into having sex, something he is rumoured to have done with other girls. But the rumours are only rumours so she cannot be rude to him, especially after she accidentally invites him to be Jane's date for the night.

== Cast ==
Character	1955–56 UK production	1956–57 Broadway production	1958 movie	1966 ITV Play of the Week	2011 UK production
Jane Broadbent	Anna Massey	Anna Massey	Sandra Dee	Philippa Gail	Louise Calf
Jimmy Broadbent	Wilfrid Hyde-White	Wilfrid Hyde-White	Rex Harrison	Leslie Phillips	Clive Francis
Sheila Broadbent	Celia Johnson	Adrianne Allen	Kay Kendall	Joan Greenwood	Jane Asher
David Hoylake-Johnston	John Merivale	John Merivale	John Saxon	Paul Ferris	Ed Cooper Clarke
David Bulloch	Peter Myers	David Cole	Peter Myers	Raymond Clarke	Alex Felton
Mabel Crosswaite	Ambrosine Phillpotts	Brenda Forbes	Angela Lansbury	Georgina Cookson	Belinda Lang
Clarrissa Crosswaite	Anna Steele	Christina Gillespie	Diane Clare	Anna Carteret	Lucy May Barker
Mrs. Edgar	Gwynne Whitby	Renee Gadd	Ambrosine Phillpotts	Virginia Clay	Andrea Miller
