= Ian Hendry =

British actor (1931–1984)

- Hendry in Live Now, Pay Later (1962)
- Born: Ian Mackendrick Hendry; 13 January 1931; Ipswich, Suffolk, England
- Died: 24 December 1984 (aged 53); London, England
- Resting place: Golders Green Crematorium
- Education: Central School of Speech and Drama
- Occupation: Actor
- Years active: 1955–1984
- Spouses: Phyllis Joanna Bell (m. 1955; div. 1962) Janet Munro (m. 1963; div. 1971) Sandra Jones (m. 1975)
- Children: 3

Ian Mackendrick Hendry (13 January 1931 – 24 December 1984) was an English actor. He worked on several British TV series of the 1960s and 1970s, including the lead in the first series of The Avengers and The Lotus Eaters. He was nominated for two BAFTA Awards for his film work: Most Promising Newcomer to Leading Film Roles for Live Now – Pay Later (1962) and Best Actor in a Supporting Role for Get Carter (1971).

His other notable film appearances included The Hill (1965), Repulsion (also 1965), Doppelgänger (1969), Tales from The Crypt (1972), Theatre of Blood (1973), and The Passenger (1975). The latter part of his career was tempered by personal and financial issues, which led him to declare bankruptcy in 1978.

== Early years ==
Hendry was born in Ipswich, Suffolk, on 13 January 1931. His mother, Enid (née Rushton), was born in Durham in 1906. His father, James Hendry, was born in 1901 in Glasgow where he graduated with a degree in chemistry from the University of Glasgow before moving to Ipswich in 1924 to take up a graduate position with R & W Paul Ltd. His grandfather, George Rushton, was an artist and Head of the Ipswich Art School (1906–1929).

Hendry's younger brother, Donald, was born on 15 August 1933. They were both educated at the Ipswich School and Culford School, Suffolk. At Culford School, Hendry took an interest in sport, particularly boxing, cricket, running and rugby. He was also involved in amateur dramatics at Culford, where he helped to produce and performed in several school plays.

== Career ==
=== 1947–1953: career choices and national service ===
On leaving school in 1947, aged 16, Hendry studied at the College of Estate Management in London. In 1948, he spent a year working for Bidwells at their Cambridge office. In 1949, he began his National Service as part of the programme of conscription in the United Kingdom introduced after World War II. He spent two years with the 32nd Medium Regiment, Royal Artillery, during which time he paced for Christopher Chataway in athletics and ran a motorcycle stunt team. On completing his national service he returned to work in estate management at Bidwells London office in Edgware. During this period, Hendry re-established his interest in acting, becoming involved in amateur theatre through a local amateur dramatics group in Edgware.

=== 1953–1955: Central School of Speech and Drama ===
By 1953, Hendry had decided to change his career and follow his ambition to become an actor. In late 1952, he applied to and was accepted for the Central School of Speech and Drama, London. He trained there from 1953 to 1955. His contemporaries at the school included Judi Dench and Vanessa Redgrave, both two years below him; Wanda Ventham, his future co-star in the series The Lotus Eaters, who was in the year below; and Jeremy Brett and Wendy Craig, who were in the year above him.

=== 1955–1959: theatre, television and film work ===
Hendry's professional acting career began in 1955, working in repertory at the Hornchurch Theatre in Station Lane. He appeared in Goldoni's Servant of Two Masters at the Edinburgh Festival. In 1957, Hendry spent another season in repertory, performing in several plays at the Oxford Playhouse, Oxford. In December 1957, Dinner with the Family transferred to the West End, playing at the New Theatre, London.

As his career developed, he gained parts in films including Up in the World (1956), The Secret Place (1957) and Room at the Top (1959).

=== 1960–1969: theatre, television and film work ===
In 1960, Hendry had a part in Sink the Bismarck! (1960). He then played the lead role of Dr Geoffrey Brent in the 12 episode crime series Police Surgeon. Hendry was next cast in the similar role of Dr David Keel in the action-adventure series The Avengers. Initially, Hendry was the star of this series, which co-starred Patrick Macnee as John Steed. However, production of the first season was curtailed by a strike and Hendry used the opportunity to depart the series and begin a film career – The Avengers continued with Macnee as its lead.

Hendry had lead roles in several films; Live Now – Pay Later (1962), Girl in the Headlines (1963), This is My Street (1964), The Hill (1965) opposite Sean Connery, and Roman Polanski's Repulsion (1965). He starred in Gerry Anderson's film, Doppelgänger (1969), also known as Journey to the Far Side of the Sun. During the 1960s he appeared in TV series such as Armchair Theatre, Danger Man, The Saint and The Gold Robbers. He played the lead role as disbarred Queen's Counsel Alex Lambert in the TV series The Informer (1966–67).

=== 1970–1979: theatre, television and film work ===
In the early 1970s, Hendry had lead roles in several TV series including The Adventures of Don Quick (1970) and The Lotus Eaters (1972–73). He guest starred, alongside Brian Blessed, in the first episode of The Sweeney, titled "Ringer", made in 1974 and broadcast early in 1975. He appeared regularly as a guest star in TV series including The Persuaders!, Dial M for Murder, Churchill's People, Thriller, Van der Valk, Supernatural, Crown Court, The Enigma Files, Bergerac and The Chinese Detective. Hendry was reunited with Patrick Macnee as a guest star on The New Avengers, although he did not reprise the role of David Keel. His previous role in the series was acknowledged, however, by Steed's parting words: "It may be seventeen years late, but welcome back Gunner." (Season 1, Ep. 7 "To catch a rat").

Towards the end of the decade Hendry appeared as a former SAS Trooper and convict Roy Gates in the Return of the Saint episode "Yesterday's Hero."

He appeared in a number of films, including the Hammer entry Captain Kronos – Vampire Hunter (1974). Among the more widely seen films he appeared in during this time were Get Carter (1971), for which he received a BAFTA nomination for Best Supporting Actor, Theatre of Blood (1973) opposite Vincent Price, The Passenger (1975) and Damien - Omen II (1978).

=== 1980–1984: television and film work ===
Hendry starred opposite Nyree Dawn Porter in the TV series For Maddie with Love (1980). In 1980 Hendry appeared in the film McVicar based on the life of the bank robber John McVicar (played by Roger Daltrey of rock band The Who). Towards the end of his life he had a role in the crime series Jemima Shore Investigates as the eponymous heroine's literary agent.

His final TV role was in 1984 in the Channel Four soap opera Brookside, playing Davey Jones, father of Petra Taylor, Marie Jackson and Michelle Jones.

== Later years ==
Hendry was declared bankrupt in the late 1970s. He suffered from several health problems in his latter years, largely due to the long-term alcoholism which affected his professional and personal life. Gerry Anderson recalled in his biography that Hendry "was always drinking", and was intoxicated during the filming of Journey to the Far Side of the Sun (1969).

His last part in a film was a substantial, though uncredited, role as a corrupt policeman in McVicar (1980).

His last public appearance was as a guest on an October 1984 episode of This Is Your Life which profiled his former Avengers co-star Patrick Macnee, who had been a special guest when This Is Your Life featured Hendry in March 1978.

== Personal life ==
Hendry's first marriage was to Phyllis Joanna Bell, née Chaddock, in September 1955. She worked as a make-up artist for Leichner. The marriage ended in 1962. On 16 February 1963, Hendry married actress Janet Munro, whom he met making Afternoon of a Nymph on TV. They had two daughters, Sally and Corrie, but their turbulent life together ended in divorce in 1971. Munro died a year later in London from the heart condition myocarditis. This was a contributory factor in Hendry's increasing alcoholism. Hendry later married Sandra (Sandy) Jones on 27 May 1975; they had a daughter, Emma.

=== Death ===
On 24 December 1984, Hendry died of gastrointestinal bleeding in London, aged 53. He was cremated, and his ashes interred in the Lily Pond beds at the Golders Green Crematorium.

== Filmography ==
=== Film ===
Year	Title	Role	Notes
1955	Simon and Laura	Bit part	Uncredited
1956	Up in the World	Commando Sergeant	Uncredited
1957	The Secret Place	Charles Maitland	Uncredited
1959	Room at the Top	Cyril	
1959	Bobbikins	BBC announcer	Uncredited
1960	Sink the Bismarck!	Officer on King George V	Uncredited
1960	In the Nick	Ted Ross	
1962	Live Now – Pay Later	Albert Argyle	
1963	Girl in the Headlines	Inspector Birkett	
1964	Children of the Damned	Colonel Tom Llewellyn	
1964	This Is My Street	Harry King	
1964	The Beauty Jungle	Don Mackenzie	
1965	Repulsion	Michael	
1965	The Hill	Staff-Sergeant Williams	
1966	The Sandwich Man	Motorcycle Policeman	
1967	Casino Royale	Hitman	Role deleted
1967	Traitors of San Angel	Nick Thomas	
1969	Cry Wolf	Hobson	
1969	The Southern Star	Karl	
1969	Journey to the Far Side of the Sun	John Kane	
1970	The McKenzie Break	Major Perry	
1971	Get Carter	Eric Paice	
1972	The Jerusalem File	General Mayer	
1972	Tales from The Crypt	Carl Maitland	
1972	All Coppers Are...	Sonny Wade	
1973	Theatre of Blood	Peregrine Devlin	
1973	Assassin	The Assassin	
1974	Captain Kronos - Vampire Hunter	Kerro	
1974	The Internecine Project	Alex Hellman	
1975	The Passenger	Martin Knight	
1976	Intimate Games	Uncle Rodney	
1978	Damien - Omen II	Michael Morgan	Uncredited
1979	The Bitch	Thrush Feather	
1980	McVicar	Hitchens	Uncredited

=== Television ===
Year	Title	Role	Notes
1956	Calling All Boys	Mr. X	TV series (all or some episodes)
1956	As Others See Us	Husband	TV series (1 episode, 20/11/56)
1958	Emergency Ward 10	Mr. Clarke	TV series (8 episodes)
1958–59	Murder Bag	Various	TV series (Episodes: 2.2: Lockhart Bags a Brooch (7/7/58) – unknown; 2.21: Lockhart Pulls The Trigger (19/11/58) – unknown; 2.32: Lockhart Visits a Hospital (5/2/59) – Doctor)
1958–59	Television Playwright	Tony	TV series (Episode 1.30: Walk on the Grass)
1959	BBC Sunday-Night Theatre	Leading Seaman Dembury	TV series (Episode 10.1: The Stone Ship)
1959	The Invisible Man	Lt. Daniels	TV series (Episode 2.12: Shadow Bomb)
1959	Crime Sheet	Not known	TV series (Episode 1.19: Lockhart Has It in Store (12/8/59))
1960	Inside Story	Peter	TV series (Episode 1.7, Return to Base)
1960	Probation Officer	Christopher Stamp	TV series (Episode 1.37)
1960	Police Surgeon	Dr. Geoffrey Brent	TV series (all 13 episodes)
1961	The Avengers	Dr. David Keel	TV series (Season 1: 25 of 26 episodes)
1962	The Ginger Man	Sebastian Balfe Dangerfield	TV film
1962	BBC Sunday-Night Play	Morgan Delt	TV plays (Play: A Suitable Case for Treatment)
1962–63	Armchair Theatre	David Simpson; Richard Bligh	Afternoon of a Nymph; A Cold Peace
1963	Drama 61-67	Harry Barnes	TV series (Drama 63: 54 Minute Affair)
1965	Danger Man (US title: Secret Agent)	Wallace/Hagen	TV series (Episode 3.13: Say it with Flowers)
1965–66	Blackmail	Various	TV series (Episode 1.8: The Case of the Phantom Lover – Steve Keen; Episode 2.11: The Man Who Could See – Ronnie Wade)
1966	Preview Tonight	Angus	TV series (Episode 1.4: Roaring Camp)
1966–67	The Informer	Alex Lambert	TV series (all 21 episodes)
1967	ITV Play of the Week	Paul Du Pre	TV plays (Play: The Crossfire)
1968	Jackanory	Narrator	TV series (Episodes 504–508)
1969	The Saint	Alessandro Destamio	TV series (Episodes 6.15 and 6.16: Vendetta for the Saint)
1969	The Gold Robbers	Tom Goodwin	TV mini-series (Episode 1.7: An Oddly Honest Man)
1970	The Adventures of Don Quick	Capt. Don Quick	TV series (all 6 episodes)
1970 – 72	ITV Playhouse	See notes	TV plays (Plays: Thursday's Child (1970) – Peter Ware; The High Game (1970) – Paul Venniker; A Splinter of Ice (1972) – Tony)
1970 – 72	ITV Saturday Night Theatre	See notes	TV plays (Plays: Dangerous Corner (1970) as Charles Staunton; Love Doesn't Grow on Trees (1971) as Eric Shiffner; A Summer Story (1972) as Nico)
1971	The Persuaders!	Lord Croxley	TV series (Episode 1.6: The Time and the Place)
1972	Suspicion	Freddo Watts	TV series (Episode: Old Man's Hat)
1972	Joy	Ben	TV film
1972	The Protectors	Inspector Wilson	TV series (Episode 1.9: Thinkback)
1972	The Frighteners	Anthony Ashworth	TV series (Episode 1.9: Bed and Breakfast)
1972 – 73	The Lotus Eaters	Erik Shepherd	TV series (all 15 episodes)
1973	Late Night Theatre	Dave	TV series (Episode: We're Strangers Here)
1974	Dial M for Murder	Marvin Stone	TV series (Episode 1.2: Contract)
1975	Thriller	Bob/Terry Spelling	TV series (Episode 4.4: Killer with Two Faces)
1975	The Sweeney	Dave Brooker	TV series (Episode 1.1: Ringer)
1975	Churchill's People	William Davenant	TV series (Episode 1.16: March On, Boys!)
1975	Village Hall	Wally	TV series (Episode 2.7: Battleground)
1975	Cooper	Officer Bryce	TV series (Episodes 1.5 and 1.6)
1976	Shades of Greene	The Man	TV series (Episode 2.8: Dream of a Strange Land)
1976	Killers	Mr. J.D. Cassels, KC	TV series (Episodes: 1.4, Murder at the Metropole; 1.3, The Crumbles Murder)
1976	The Dick Emery Show	Russian agent	TV series (Episode 15.2)
1976	The New Avengers	Irwin Gunner	TV series (Episode 1.7: To Catch a Rat)
1976	ITV Sunday Night Drama	Alex Fleming	TV series (Episode: The Goldfinch)
1977	Supernatural	Zoltan Vinzenz	TV series (Episodes: 1.2, Countess Ilona; 1.3, The Werewolf Reunion)
1977	Van der Valk	Boersma	TV series (Episode 3.11: Gold Plated Delinquents)
1978	Premiere	Nifty	TV series (Episode 2.1: Crest of a Wave)
1978	Return of the Saint	Roy Gates	TV series (Episode 1.7: Yesterday's Hero)
1979	Crown Court	Frank Edwards	TV series (Episodes 8.43–8.45: Cowboy, parts 1 to 3)
1980	The Enigma Files	Joe Mackie	TV series (Episode 1.5: Investigation of a Copper)
1980	For Maddie with Love	Malcolm Laurie	TV series
1981	The Chinese Detective	Eddie Dwyer	TV series (Episode 1.6: Ice and Dust)
1981	Smuggler	Agate	TV mini-series (Episode1.11: An Eye for an Eye)
1981	Bergerac	Major Furneaux	TV series (Episode 1.4: Campaign for Silence)
1983	Jemima Shore Investigates	Cy	TV series (Episodes: 1.5: Dr. Ziegler's Casebook; 1.10 High Style; 1.11: The Damask Collection)
1984	Brookside	Davey Jones	TV series (Episodes 142–146: Etiquette; King Rat; Tights; Transport; Off)

=== Radio appearances ===
Year	Title	Role	Network	Notes
1969	Unscheduled Stop	Robin Fiske	BBC Radio 4	An adaptation of Derek Bond's Unscheduled Stop
1971	The Third Man	Harry Lime	BBC Radio	An adaptation of Graham Greene's The Third Man
1973	Desert Island Discs	Himself (guest)	BBC Radio	
1976	Five Roundabouts to Heaven	Not known	BBC Radio World Service	An adaptation of John Bingham's Five Roundabouts
1978	A Moon for the Misbegotten	Tyrone	BBC Radio 3	
1978	A Little Bit of Heaven	Gerry Mahood	BBC Radio 4	
1983	The Price of Silence	Maxon	BBC Radio	

== Theatre credits ==
Year	Title	Role(s)	Venue	Notes
1951	Ring Round The Moon	Hugo/Frederic	Edgware Amateur Dramatics Production	
1955	Reluctant Heroes	Tone	Queen's Theatre, Hornchurch	
1955	Witness for the Prosecution	Leonard Vole	Queen's Theatre, Hornchurch	
1955	This Happy Breed	Reg	Queen's Theatre, Hornchurch	
1955	Our Town	Prof. Willard	Queen's Theatre, Hornchurch	
1955	The Recruiting Officer	Constable	Queen's Theatre, Hornchurch	
1956	The Adventures of Davy Crockett		Queen's Theatre, Hornchurch	
1957	Paradise Street		Mahatma Gandhi Hall, Studio Theatre Club	
1957	Frost at Midnight	Dodger	Oxford Playhouse	
1957	Lysistrata	Strymodoros	Oxford Playhouse	
1957	Figure of Fun	Freddie	Oxford Playhouse	
1957	The Critic and the Heart	Pat Rye	Oxford Playhouse	
1957	The Beaux Stratagem	Francis Archer	Oxford Playhouse	
1957	Change in the Wind	Charles Auguste	Oxford Playhouse	
1957	The Man Who Came To Dinner	Prof. Metz	Oxford Playhouse	
1957	Arlecchino		Edinburgh Festival	
1957	Dinner with the Family	Jacques	Oxford Playhouse	
1957	Dinner with the Family	Jacques	Cambridge Arts Theatre	
1957	Dinner with the Family	Jacques	King's Theatre, Glasgow	
1957	Dinner with the Family	Jacques	Theatre Royal, Brighton	
1957	Dinner with the Family	Jacques	Royal Lyceum Theatre, Edinburgh	
1957	Dinner with the Family	Jacques	New Theatre, London	
1959	Murder on Arrival	Steve Taylor	Westminster Theatre, London	
1960	Hedda Gabler	George Tesman	Oxford Playhouse	
1970	No Exit	Joseph Garcin	Oxford Playhouse	
1970	The Bear	Grigoriy Smirnov	Oxford Playhouse	
1970	In Camera	Joseph Garcin	Ashcroft Theatre, Croydon	
1970	The Bear	Grigoriy Smirnov	Ashcroft Theatre, Croydon	
1976	Motive	Wallace Barrows	Yvonne Arnaud Theatre, Guildford, Surrey	
1976	Motive	Wallace Barrows	Theatre Royal, Brighton	
1976	Motive	Wallace Barrows	Theatre Royal, Norwich	
1977	The Owl and the Pussycat	Felix	Kings Theatre, Southsea	
1977	The Owl and the Pussycat	Felix	Cambridge Arts Theatre	
1977	The Owl and the Pussycat	Felix	Wolverhampton Grand Theatre	
1978	Otherwise Engaged	Simon	Grand Theatre, Leeds	
1978	Otherwise Engaged	Simon	Theatre Royal, Nottingham	
1978	Otherwise Engaged	Simon	Wolverhampton Grand Theatre	
1978	Lady Windermere's Fan	Lord Windermere	Yvonne Arnaud Theatre, Guildford, Surrey	
1978	Lady Windermere's Fan	Lord Windermere	Theatre Royal, Norwich	

== Awards and nominations ==
Award	Year	Category	Work	Result
British Academy Film Award	1962	Most Promising Newcomer to Leading Film Roles	Live Now, Pay Later	Nominated
British Academy Film Award	1971	Best Actor in a Supporting Role	Get Carter	Nominated
Rediffusion Golden Star Award	1966	Best Actor	The Informer	Won

== Further reading - biography ==
Hershman, Gabriel. Send in the Clowns – The Yo Yo Life of Ian Hendry, Lulu.com, 2013; ISBN 9781291270976
