= Stretford Children's Theatre =

Stretford Children's Theatre is a youth theatre based in Stretford, England. It was founded in the 1940s by Bertram H. Holland, and ceased to exist in the late 1970s or early 1980s. An offshoot adult theatre company made up of former members of the children's theatre existed in the 1970s. It was resurrected in October 2015 by Shelly Quinton-Hulme MBE who gathered a group of local Stretford people together to reform the theatre group and return the group to Stretford Public Hall. Holland wrote a book about the theatre in 1968 called Beginners on Stage.

== History ==
Founded in 1945 by B.H. Holland. It moved to premises on Sidney Street after Bertram Holland's death. The last remaining trace of the former Stretford Children's Theatre is the Bertram Holland Trophy which is awarded annually by the Greater Manchester Drama Federation.

== Former members ==
Former members include Lynn Roden, John Comer, Vicky Ogden, John Mahoney, June Ritchie, and Brian Trueman,.
