= Jack Hanbury =

British film producer (1904–1968)

Jack Hanbury (1904 – January 1968). was a British film producer.

Films he has produced include Sky West and Crooked and Three Hats for Lisa.
