= Police surgeon =

Police surgeon may refer to:

- Police Surgeon (British TV series), a British ITV television series from 1960
- Dr. Simon Locke, also known as Police Surgeon, a Canadian syndicated television series from 1971-1974
- The topic of forensic pathology
