= Churchill's People =

1974–1975 BBC television series

- Genre: Historical drama
- Country of origin: United Kingdom
- Original language: English
- No. of series: 1
- No. of episodes: 26

Production
- Producer: Gerald Savory
- Running time: 50 min

Original release
- Network: BBC1
- Release: 30 December 1974 – 23 June 1975

Churchill's People is a series of 26 historical dramas produced by the BBC, based on Winston Churchill's A History of the English-Speaking Peoples. The series was first broadcast on BBC1 in 1974 and 1975. It was produced to mark the centenary of Churchill's birth.

The series was considered misconceived for multiple reasons, such as the studio-bound production which offered little in the way of realism and the lack of available funding. Each episode dealt with a particular period in British history, and the quality was consequently variable. Much of the acting was criticised, despite the involvement of Richard Johnson, Robert Hardy, Alan Howard, Colin Blakely, Anna Massey, Gemma Jones, and Edward Fox, amongst others. The series was reviewed at some length in the programme TV Hell, which revealed that viewing figures had plummeted from 2 million at the series' launch to less than half a million by the fifth episode. The programme was swiftly buried in a later time-slot for the remainder of its run.

Nancy Banks-Smith in The Guardian described it as having "little to offer us but blood, horsehair and history. Though a hell of a lot of each."

== Episodes ==
#	Title	Original air date
1	Pritan	30 December 1974
2	The Lost Island	6 January 1975
3	The Coming of the Cross	13 January 1975
4	King Alfred	20 January 1975
5	The Saxon Dusk	27 January 1975
6	The Conquerors	3 February 1975
7	A Sprig of Broom	10 February 1975
8	Silver Giant, Wooden Dwarf	17 February 1975
9	On the Anvil	24 February 1975
10	The Wallace	3 March 1975
11	Shouts and Murmurs	10 March 1975
12	A Wilderness of Roses	17 March 1975
13	The Whip of Heaven	24 March 1975
14	A Rich and Beautiful Empire	31 March 1975
15	America! America!	7 April 1975
16	March On, Boys!	14 April 1975
17	The Agreement of the People	21 April 1975
18	A Bill of Mortality	28 April 1975
19	The Derry Boys	5 May 1975
20	The Fine Art of Bubble-Blowing	12 May 1975
21	O Canada	19 May 1975
22	Liberty Tree	26 May 1975
23	Mother India	2 June 1975
24	Mutiny	9 June 1975
25	True Patriots All	16 June 1975
26	Death of Liberty	23 June 1975
