= Belinda Carroll =

English stage and television actress (born 1945)

- Born: 22 July 1945 (age 81); Oxford, England
- Occupation: Actress
- Years active: 1963–2016
- Spouses: Simon Williams (divorced) Michael Cochrane (m. 1979)
- Children: 3
- Relatives: Kate O'Mara (sister)

Belinda Carroll (born 22 July 1945) is an English stage and television actress.

== Background and early career ==
Born in Oxfordshire, Carroll's parents were John F. Carroll, a flying instructor with the Royal Air Force, and actress Hazel Bainbridge (born as Edith Marion Bainbridge; 25 January 1910 – 7 January 1998). Her maternal grandfather was manager of the Oxford Playhouse theatre; Carroll recalled that she was "fifth generation of an acting family ... mostly actor managers" (speaking at memorial service for Kate O'Mara at St Paul's, Covent Garden). Carroll's elder sister was actress Kate O'Mara; the two attended a convent boarding school in Chertsey which, according to Carroll, they both found miserable. Subsequently, she trained in provincial repertory, joining the Wimbledon Repertory Company after leaving school, and made her debut in London's West End aged 20, when she took over the role of Marion from Barbara Ferris in Terence Frisby's long-running comedy There's a Girl in My Soup, opposite Donald Sinden and Clive Francis.

== Stage and television ==
Her other stage roles from the late 1960s to early 1980s included parts in His, Hers and Theirs with Gladys Cooper; The Pleasure of His Company with Douglas Fairbanks, Jr.; Peter Pan (as Wendy) with Dorothy Tutin; with Jean Kent and David Jason as the often skimpily clad Frances Hunter in No Sex Please, We're British; Charley’s Aunt with John Inman; and as Anne Meredith in Agatha Christie's Cards on the Table (1981).

Carroll appeared subsequently in many productions around Britain and on television in Crown Court (TV series), (' Good and Faithful Friends ' episode), Callan (TV series), The Duchess of Duke Street (1976), Wodehouse Playhouse, (1978), Malice Aforethought (1979), Lovejoy, (1991), and Casualty (2001). She starred with James Fox and Simon Williams in the psychological drama No Longer Alone (1978).

Carroll and Kate O'Mara performed together only twice, once on television as prostitutes with Ronnie Barker, and, when Carroll was in her sixties, touring for Bill Kenwright in Lord Arthur Savile's Crime by Oscar Wilde.

== Family ==
Carroll was married first to actor Simon Williams, who also appeared in No Sex Please, We're British. They had two children, Tam and Amy Williams, also actors, before divorcing in the late 1970s. She married actor Michael Cochrane in 1979.
