= The Persuaders! =

British television series (1971–1972)

- Also known as: See list
- Genre: Action comedy; Adventure
- Created by: Robert S. Baker
- Starring: Tony Curtis; Roger Moore; Laurence Naismith
- Theme music composer: John Barry
- Composers: Ken Thorne; David Lindup; Don Kirshner
- Country of origin: United Kingdom
- Original language: English
- No. of series: 1
- No. of episodes: 24

Production
- Executive producer: Robert S. Baker
- Producer: Roger Moore
- Cinematography: Tony Spratling
- Running time: 49 mins
- Production companies: Television Reporters International; Tribune Production

Original release
- Network: ITV (UK); ABC (US)
- Release: 17 September 1971 – 25 February 1972

The Persuaders! is a British action comedy television series starring Tony Curtis and Roger Moore, produced by ITC Entertainment, and initially broadcast on ITV and ABC from 17 September 1971 to 25 February 1972. The show has been called "the last major entry in the cycle of adventure series that began 11 years earlier with Danger Man in 1960", as well as "the most ambitious and most expensive of Sir Lew Grade's international action adventure series". The Persuaders! was filmed in Britain, France, and Italy between May 1970 and June 1971.

Despite its focus on the British and American markets, The Persuaders! became more successful elsewhere. It won its highest awards in Australia and Spain, and Roger Moore and Tony Curtis were honoured in Germany and France for their acting.

The Persuaders! used many of the resources of Moore's previous show, The Saint. These included locations, and the idea of reusing many of the visible vehicles from episode to episode. The series' synth-laden theme music was composed by John Barry.

== Premise ==
The Persuaders are two equally-matched men from different backgrounds who reluctantly team together to solve cases that the police and the courts cannot.

Danny Wilde, portrayed by Tony Curtis, is a rough diamond, educated and molded in the slums of New York City, who escaped by enlisting in the US Navy. He later became a millionaire in the oil business, subsequently making and then losing several fortunes as a Wall Street investor. Listless and without purpose, he jets around the world spending his money on frivolous ventures. Curtis himself had suffered a tough childhood in the Bronx, and also had served in the US Navy. Curtis was 46 when he made The Persuaders!, but he performed all his own stunts and fight sequences.

Lord Brett Rupert George Robert Andrew Sinclair, played by Roger Moore, is a polished British nobleman, educated at Harrow and Oxford, a former British Army officer, ex-racing car driver and race horse owner, who addresses his colleague as "Daniel". Sinclair is described as well-educated and well off, but uses his privilege and assets only to eat luxury food, drink cocktails, and sleep with women. In the episode "The Ozerov Inheritance", Brett's full name is given as Brett Rupert George Robert Andrew Sinclair, Earl of Marnock, and it is confirmed that his grandfather was the 13th Earl.

A pair of globetrotting millionaire playboys, the men are brought together by retired Judge Fulton (Laurence Naismith) in the French Riviera. They instantly dislike each other and destroy a hotel bar during a fist-fight. They are arrested and delivered to Fulton, who offers them the choice of spending 90 days in jail or helping him to right errors of impunity. Grudgingly, Wilde and Sinclair agree to help Fulton to solve a case. He then releases them from any threat of jail.

The men develop a sparing affection for each other and soon stumble into more adventures, sometimes by chance, sometimes on commission from Judge Fulton. Although the Judge recurs in the series, he has no formal relationship with his two agents. Eleven episodes depict his finding a way to convince Wilde and Sinclair to act on his behalf. For instance, in "Angie, Angie" he easily convinces one of the pair. In "The Man in the Middle" he endangers his agents so that they must act on his behalf. When they are short of cash he lures them with money. In "Powerswitch" he manipulates events from the shadows, and Sinclair and Wilde do not know that he is involved.

Some episodes rely on Danny being mistaken for other people, usually by some bizarre coincidence. In "Element of Risk", he is mistaken for a criminal mastermind named Lomax, played by Shane Rimmer. In "Anyone Can Play", he is mistaken at a Brighton casino for a Russian spy paymaster.

In episode 12, "That's Me Over There", it appears that Sinclair has had a longstanding interest in crime-fighting, as he has had a dedicated telephone line installed for an informer on a master criminal. In episode 17, "Five Miles to Midnight", Sinclair tells Joan Collins's character that he is working for the judge because it has given him something worthwhile to do after his failed motor racing career. Wilde never reveals or explains his motives.

=== Title sequence ===
The Persuaders! titles and synthesiser theme, by John Barry, establish the background and current identities of the protagonists via split-screen narrative technique: two dossiers, one red, one blue, labelled Danny Wilde and Brett Sinclair simultaneously depict their lives. The younger images of Tony Curtis are genuine, whereas the images of Roger Moore (with one exception) were mock-ups created for the credits. As the biographies approach their current ages, a series of four short sequences combine live footage with torn newspaper clippings, connoting their excitingly peripatetic lifestyles. The conclusion shows them together enjoying a life of sport, drink, women and gambling. The titles were specifically designed so that neither actor would appear to have top billing, something both Moore and Curtis stipulated when they agreed to co-star.

The title sequence retains a certain cachet among professional film editors. In 1995, Peugeot released an advertisement for the 306 car, with the theme of the opening title sequence, the split-screen process and even the voice of Michel Roux, who dubbed Tony Curtis in the French broadcast of the original series. In 2007, France 2 satirically used it to introduce a report about relations between the newly elected French President Nicolas Sarkozy and his first Prime Minister François Fillon.

=== Cars ===
The protagonists drive signature cars. Danny Wilde drives a red left-hand-drive Dino 246 GT (chassis number 00810) build by Ferrari . Brett Sinclair drives a UK-registered Bahama Yellow right-hand-drive 6-cylinder Aston Martin DBS (chassis number DBS/5636/R) with V8 wheels and markings. Both cars were provided to the show's producers courtesy of the respective vehicle manufacturers.

As with Simon Templar — Roger Moore's character in the television series The Saint — Sinclair's car has personalised number plates of his initials: Simon Templar's were "ST 1", Brett Sinclair's are "BS 1" (except for one scene in the episode "The Gold Napoleon", where the car is seen with its real UK registration number PPP 6H). The true owner of the index number of Sinclair's car, Billy Smart, Jr., permitted its use in the series.

The Aston Martin from the show was sold by the factory after filming ended, via H.R. Owen in London, to its first private owner. It was restored in recent years by the Aston Martin factory, and is presently owned by divorce lawyer and art collector Jeremy Levison. Both Moore and Curtis had signed the underside of the car's boot (rear luggage compartment): Moore at Pinewood Studios in May 2003; Curtis at Cheltenham Racecourse in October 2008. In 2013, the Aston Martin DBS was an invited participant at two of Europe's most exclusive motoring concours, the Concorso d'Eleganza Villa d'Este at Lake Como, and the Salon Privé Concours in London.

Danny Wilde's Dino bears Italian registration plate MO 221400 (the "MO" component represents the province of Modena, which happens to be the headquarters and manufacturing base of Ferrari). The exact whereabouts of the Dino today is unknown, but it is believed to be in private ownership in Italy.

== Cast ==
=== Main ===
- Tony Curtis as Danny Wilde
- Roger Moore as Lord Brett Sinclair
- Laurence Naismith as Judge Fulton

== Production ==
The concept of The Persuaders! originated in one of the final episodes of The Saint, titled "The Ex-King of Diamonds", wherein Simon Templar (Moore) is partnered with a Texas oilman (Stuart Damon) in a Monte Carlo gambling adventure. Pleased with that combination, Robert S. Baker and Lew Grade funded the new series. Unusually, production of the series began and continued without contracts among the producers and Moore. Moreover, Moore's role as producer is not obvious from watching the series, but Curtis confirmed the fact: "Roger was always like the host with the show, because it was his company that was producing it. I would say he was the largest independent owner of it; Roger and his company owned it with Bob Baker, and Sir Lew owned the rest of it."

Curtis became involved in the series because ITC knew it needed an American co-star to ensure the series would be picked up by US television stations. Initially, the role was offered to Rock Hudson and Glenn Ford, but they each rejected the part. ITC then asked the American Broadcasting Company for a list of suitable actors, which included Tony Curtis. He eventually agreed, and flew to the UK in April 1970 to commence location filming.

Filming was conducted on location in Europe (such as location filming in France, Spain, Sweden, and Italy) and at Pinewood Studios in Iver Heath, Buckinghamshire. In total, 24 episodes of The Persuaders! were completed; each cost £100,000, (or approx. £1,650,000 in 2025) to make. Only one series of The Persuaders! was made because Moore accepted the role of James Bond in the 007 franchise. In the DVD documentary, The Morning After, Baker stated that Grade was prepared to finance a second series, despite its failure in America, by re-casting with Noel Harrison, son of Rex Harrison, as a replacement for Moore. Baker states that he convinced Grade that the dynamic that Moore and Curtis had worked out was unique, and it was better to leave the series as it stood.

During The Persuaders!, Moore acted — officially and practically — as his own wardrobe stylist. It stemmed from genuine sartorial interests and because he was the director of textile firm Pearson and Foster. Every episode carried the closing credit, 'Lord Sinclair's clothes designed by Roger Moore', with 'Roger Moore' written as a large signature.

=== Curtis and Moore relationship ===
There is much speculation about the professional relationship between Moore and Curtis, on- and off-set. In her autobiography Second Act, Joan Collins detailed how they did not get along when she was a guest star. She cited Curtis's foul temper as the reason why the set of the episode "Five Miles to Midnight" was tense. In a 2005 interview given to the British Film Institute, director Val Guest confirmed Collins's assessment of Curtis:

Yes, it was great fun doing The Persuaders in spite of Tony Curtis. [laughter] I'll tell you a funny story about that. Tony was on pot at the time and I used to have to say 'oh, go and have a smoke.' Because he always had some gripe of some kind. And one day we were shooting on the Croisette in Cannes. And we'd been roped off our little thing, and there were crowds all around watching us film and everything and Tony Curtis came down to do his scene and he was just carrying on at the wardrobe saying 'you didn't do this and you should have done that... and in Hollywood you would have been fired...' And dear Roger Moore walked over, took him by the lapels, looked him straight in the eyes and said 'and to think those lips once kissed Piper Laurie.' [laughter] Well, the whole of the Croisette collapsed, the unit collapsed and I must say even Tony had to laugh. But we were asked to do another... we got the award that year for the best TV series, I think it was, and they wanted to do a repeat and I remember Roger saying 'with Tony Curtis, not on your life.' And he went on to become James Bond, so he did all right.

— Val Guest, director

In his autobiography, Still Dancing, Lew Grade noted that the actors "didn't hit it off all that well", because of different work ethics. According to Moore's autobiography, Curtis's use of cannabis was so extensive that he even smoked it in front of a police officer while filming at 10 Downing Street. Despite third-party claims, Curtis and Moore consistently maintained they had an amicable working relationship. Moore said: "Tony and I had a good on- and off-screen relationship; we are two very different people, but we did share a sense of humour."

In a 2005 interview, Curtis referred to Moore with affection and stated that he would not participate in a remake of The Persuaders! without Moore.

== Reception ==
=== UK and US ===
Although the series was placed in the top 20 of most-viewed television series in Britain throughout 1971, Lew Grade wanted it to do well in the profitable American television market. It followed his earlier series such as Man in a Suitcase, The Champions and The Baron. But The Persuaders! made little impact in America, airing on ABC on Saturday nights opposite Mission: Impossible. In an interview given in 2007, Curtis attributed the lack of success in the US to the ABC network failing to screen it at prime time. Shortly after the series' cancellation in 1972, Moore was cast as James Bond for the film Live and Let Die, in what would be the beginning of a successful seven-film run for Moore as Bond, putting paid to any chance of the series being resurrected.

ITC subsequently sought to repackage and re-release The Persuaders! in the American market, by editing eight of the episodes together and releasing them as four 90-minute TV movies (each comprising two episodes from the series, typically missing only their original opening and closing title sequences). These were:

- London Conspiracy (from "Greensleeves" and "A Home of One's Own". There is a piece from "Angie, Angie...")
- Sporting Chance (from "Someone Waiting" and "Anyone Can Play")
- Mission: Monte Carlo (from "Powerswitch" and "The Gold Napoleon")
- The Switch (from "The Ozerov Inheritance" and "Angie, Angie...")

There was also a proposed fifth TV movie but was not completed this was

- The Persuaders (from "Overture" and "The Man In The Middle")

But the trailer and opening is included in the 2006 Region 2 DVD/2011 Region B Blu Ray Network Special Edition set along with the 4 completed films and their trailers

- Death Becomes Me (from "Someone Like Me" and "A Death in the Family")

=== International distribution ===
Despite the overall disappointment in the UK and US, The Persuaders! sold well in other international markets, particularly Continental Europe. This success allowed ITC to recoup much of its production costs, soon after principal photography was completed. The series has remained popular in Germany, Denmark, France, Norway, Finland, Sweden, Russia, Hungary and Italy; episodes are still regularly repeated throughout Europe. For instance, DR2 in Denmark rebroadcast the entire series on weekday early evenings during the spring of 2012.

- Argentina, Chile, Colombia, Mexico, Venezuela: Dos Tipos Audaces ('Two Bold Characters')
- Belgium: De Speelvogels ('The Playboys') / Amicalement Vôtre ('Amicably Yours')
- Brazil: Persuaders
- Denmark: De Uheldige Helte ('The Hapless Heroes')
- Estonia: Kelmid ja Pühakud ('Crooks and Saints')
- Finland: Veijareita ja Pyhimyksiä ('Rascals and Saints') [the rascal is Tony Curtis and the saint is Roger Moore, naturally]
- France: Amicalement Vôtre ('Amicably Yours')
- Germany: Die Zwei ('The Two')
- Greece: Οι Αντίζηλοι ('The Rivals')
- Hungary: Minden Lében Két Kanál ('Two Spoons in Every Soup')
- Iceland: Fóstbræður ('Brothers in Arms')
- Iran: کاوشگران ('The Explorers')
- Iraq: ('The Persuaders')
- Israel: המשכנעים ('The Persuaders')
- Italy: Attenti a Quei Due ('Careful about Those Two')
- Japan: ダンディ2 華麗な冒険 ('Two Dandies' Brilliant Adventures')
- Latvia: Viltnieki ('The Tricksters')
- Lithuania: Įtikinėtojai! ('The Persuaders!')
- Netherlands: De Versierders ('The Seducers')
- Norway: Gullguttene ('Golden Boys')
- Pakistan: کے محرک ('The Persuaders')
- Poland: Partnerzy ('Partners')
- Portugal: Os Persuasores ('The Persuaders')
- Romania: Brett și Danny ('Brett and Danny')
- Russia: Сыщики – любители экстра-класса ('Extra Class Amateur Detectives')
- Slovenia: Tekmeca ('Rivals')
- Spain: Los Persuasores ('The Persuaders')
- Sweden: Snobbar som Jobbar ('Snobs on the Job')
- Turkey: Kaygısızlar ('Relaxed Ones')
- Yugoslavia: Suparnici ('Rivals')

In the UK, The Persuaders! had re-runs on Channel 4, Granada Plus, Bravo and ITV4 in the 1990s and 2000s. When the pilot episode, "Overture", was screened as part of Channel 4's nostalgia strand TV Heaven in 1992, that series' host (comedy writer Frank Muir) said in a Radio Times interview that The Persuaders! "must have been the best bad series ever made... absolute hokum". However, BBC Radio 5 presenter Dave Aldridge later asked: "Was seventies TV really this good?"

=== Redubbed versions ===
Die Zwei, the German version of The Persuaders!, became a cult hit in Germany and Austria. This was largely because of the substantively altered dubbing, written and directed by Rainer Brandt, creating a completely different program. In France, Amicalement Vôtre ('Amicably Yours') was based on the re-dubbed German version instead of the English original.

The German dubbing was described as "a unique mixture of street slang and ironic tongue-in-cheek remarks' and it 'even mentioned Lord Sinclair becoming 007 on one or two occasions". Dialogue frequently broke the fourth wall with lines like "Junge, lass doch die Sprüche, die setzen ja die nächste Folge ab!" ('Lad, just quit the big talk, or they'll cancel the next episode!') in S01/E05 at 44:36 or "Du musst jetzt etwas schneller werden, sonst bist Du nicht synchron" ('You have to speed up [talk faster] now, or else you won't be in sync').

Research from the University of Hamburg notes the only common elements between Die Zwei and The Persuaders! are the images. Other than "the linguistic changes entailed by the process of translation, result in radically different characterizations of the protagonists of the series. The language use in the translations is characterized by a greater degree of sexual explicitness and verbal violence, as well as an unveiled pro-American attitude which is not found in the source texts."

In 2006, a news story by CBS News on the German dubbing industry mentioned The Persuaders! The report discovered that many German dubbing artists believed that 'staying exactly true to the original was not always the highest aim'. Rainer Brandt, co-ordinator of the German dubbing of The Persuaders! and Curtis' dubbing voice, said: "When a company says they want something to be commercially successful, to make people laugh, I give it a woof. I make them laugh like they would in a Bavarian beer garden."

Other researchers suggest that international versions of The Persuaders! were given different translations, simply because the original English series would not have made sense to local audiences. For instance, the nuanced differences between the accents and manners of Curtis, the American self-made millionaire Danny Wilde from the Brooklyn slums, and Moore, the most polished British Lord Sinclair, would be hard to convey to foreign viewers. Argentinian academic Sergio Viaggio commented "how could it have been preserved in Spanish? By turning Curtis into a low class Caracan and Moore into an aristocratic Madrileño? Here, not even the approach that works with My Fair Lady would be of any avail; different sociolects of the same vernacular will not do — much less in subtitling, where all differences in accent are irreparably lost."

=== Awards and accolades ===
- Winner – Logie Award 1972 Best Overseas Drama (Australia)
- Winner – TP de Oro Award 1973 Best Foreign Series (Spain)
- Winner – Bambi 1973 for Curtis and Moore (Germany)

== Episode list ==
Airdates are from LWT London. ITV. Regions varied date and order (Granada and Anglia, for instance, transmitted a day earlier). The production number refers to the order on Network's DVD.

No.	Title	Directed by	Written by	Original release date	Prod. code
1	"Overture"	Basil Dearden	Brian Clemens	17 September 1971	101
Mysterious invitations lead millionaire playboys Danny Wilde and Lord Brett Sinclair to Monte Carlo, where a woman named Maria (played by Imogen Hassall) holds the key to a crime syndicate that appears to be operating with a dead boss. Laurence Naismith co-stars as Judge Fulton.
2	"The Gold Napoleon"	Roy Ward Baker	Val Guest	24 September 1971	106
The niece (Susan George) of a jeweller (Harold Goldblatt) is marked for death when she discovers that reproduction gold coins are being marketed as real. Towards the end of this episode, Lord Sinclair's Aston Martin is seen – in a chase across the Italian border – to reveal its true identity by way of its front number plate, being black characters on a white background, "PPP 6H".
3	"Take Seven"	Sidney Hayers	Terry Nation	1 October 1971	108
When a supposedly dead man (Christian Roberts) reappears to claim his inheritance, a beautiful aristocrat (Sinéad Cusack) asks Brett and Danny to expose him as an imposter.
4	"Greensleeves"	David Greene	Terence Feely	8 October 1971	111
An old, abandoned manor called Greensleeves is suspiciously restored unbeknownst to its rightful owner, Lord Sinclair. He must impersonate himself, and, with the help of Danny, discover why "MI5 agents" (Andrew Keir, Rosemary Nicols and Tom Adams) have invited Richard Congoto (Cy Grant), an African leader and old school friend of Brett's, to the manor for talks.
5	"Powerswitch"	Basil Dearden	John Kruse	15 October 1971	105
A mysterious drowning leads Brett to a beautiful dancer (Annette Andre), and a man who appears to be an old business associate of Danny's. Although Judge Fulton appears in this episode, he does not share any scenes with Danny or Brett and both Danny and Brett are unaware that they are actually working on behalf of the Judge.
6	"The Time and the Place"	Roger Moore	Michael Pertwee	22 October 1971	117
No one will believe that Danny has found a veteran political journalist dead at the country estate of a right-wing British politician (Ian Hendry), when the "corpse" appears to be alive and well.
7	"Someone Like Me"	Roy Ward Baker	Terry Nation	29 October 1971	109
Danny wants to meet Brett's reclusive multi-millionaire friend (Bernard Lee), but someone abducts Brett and places him in a mysterious hospital where an operation is planned to create a perfect double of him.
8	"Anyone Can Play"	Leslie Norman	Tony Williamson	5 November 1971	116
Danny thinks he cannot lose when he plays his new betting system in an English casino, but whilst there he's mistaken for the paymaster of a very different system.
9	"The Old, the New and the Deadly"	Leslie Norman	Brian Clemens	12 November 1971	107
Danny is mistaken for a blackmailer who is the target of both a cruel French Count (Patrick Troughton) and the beautiful daughter (Anna Gaël) of a disgraced politician. In a hotel room scene, Danny rushes from the bathroom to answer the telephone – "Hello... yes, long distance... huh. No, this is not Mr Schwartz... you got the wrong room" – whilst a gunman simultaneously knocks at the door. This was an in-joke: Tony Curtis' real name was Bernard Schwartz.
10	"Angie... Angie"	Val Guest	Milton S. Gelman	19 November 1971	104
Bullets fly on the French Riviera when Danny encounters Angie (Larry Storch), his childhood buddy from the old neighbourhood, whose path to retirement may mean a deadly retirement for Danny.
11	"Chain of Events"	Peter Hunt	Terry Nation	26 November 1971	110
Danny gets himself chained to an attaché case intended for the British Secret Service (George Baker, Suzanna Leigh), and pursued by deadly Iron Curtain agents (Peter Vaughn et al.) who want the case back and the courier dead.
12	"That's Me Over There"	Leslie Norman	Brian Clemens	3 December 1971	120
After a friend (Terence Edmond) of Brett's is murdered after gathering evidence on crooked businessman Thaddeus Krane (Geoffrey Keen), Brett himself is kidnapped by his henchmen (Derek Newark, Allan Cuthbertson, Neil Hallett, Peter Gilmore) and Danny must impersonate Brett at an auction to get key evidence from an endangered informant (Suzan Farmer).
13	"The Long Goodbye"	Roger Moore	Michael Pertwee	10 December 1971	118
Fulton sends the boys to Scotland, where they find a wrecked plane, a dead scientist, and a formula for cheap synthetic fuel which attracts deadly interest as well as a string of beautiful girls, all claiming to be the late inventor's heiress.
14	"The Man in the Middle"	Leslie Norman	Donald James	17 December 1971	124
Fulton persuades Brett to help identify a traitor in British Intelligence; but when Brett and Danny fall foul of MI5 agent Kay (Suzy Kendall), Brett's untrustworthy cousin Archie (Terry-Thomas) must save the day.
15	"Element of Risk"	Gerald Mayer	Tony Barwick	24 December 1971	114
Brett must extricate Danny when he's mistaken for an American criminal mastermind (Shane Rimmer) whose suave confederate (Peter Bowles) is planning a gold heist. Margaret Nolan appears as Sophie. Carol Cleveland appears as "Girl at Airport"
16	"A Home of One's Own"	James Hill	Terry Nation	31 December 1971	119
Danny gets more than he bargains for when his newest acquisition, an English country cottage, proves to house a deadly secret. Actress Hannah Gordon guest stars.
17	"Five Miles to Midnight"	Val Guest	Terry Nation	7 January 1972	103
In Rome, Frank Rocco (Robert Hutton), a Mafia hitman, is on the run from the Mob after offering to turn state's evidence. Fulton asks Brett and Danny to get him out of the country, but when a beautiful photographer (Joan Collins) gets involved the boys find themselves in a shooting war.
18	"Nuisance Value"	Leslie Norman	David Rolfe and Tony Barwick	14 January 1972	122
When the spoiled daughter (Vivienne Ventura) of an immensely wealthy man (George Murcell) is apparently kidnapped, Danny and Brett discover the unsuspected perils of double-dating, when suspicion of being behind the kidnapping falls on them!
19	"The Morning After"	Leslie Norman	Walter Black	21 January 1972	113
Lord Sinclair wakes up from a wild party in Stockholm with a hangover – and a wife (Catherine Schell)! When the validity of the marriage is confirmed, Danny pursues clues that point to a Scandinavian diplomat (Griffith Jones) and a political conspiracy.
20	"Read and Destroy"	Roy Ward Baker	Peter Yeldham	28 January 1972	121
When Brett's friend Felix (Joss Ackland) has woman trouble (with guest star Kate O'Mara), Brett and Danny are drawn into a deceptive game of espionage, as ex-spy Felix tries to publish his memoirs. With Nigel Green.
21	"A Death in the Family"	Sidney Hayers	Terry Nation	4 February 1972	123
Someone is killing off Brett's aristocratic relatives one by one, and unless he and Danny can identify the murderer the next name on the family tomb will be his own. Guest starring Denholm Elliott and Diane Cilento. (In an homage to Alec Guinness in the 1949 film Kind Hearts and Coronets, Roger Moore plays three different members, two men and a woman, of the Sinclair family and Tony Curtis appears as Danny's aunt at the end.)
22	"The Ozerov Inheritance"	Roy Ward Baker	Harry W. Junkin	11 February 1972	112
Grand Duchess Ozerov (Gladys Cooper) seeks Brett's help in saving her family jewels; but her lovely granddaughter, the Princess Alexandra (Prunella Ransome), is not the only discovery the boys make when doing genealogical research.
23	"To the Death, Baby"	Basil Dearden	Donald James	18 February 1972	102
Brett and Danny try to save a beautiful heiress (Jennie Linden) who is the target of a slippery con man (Terence Morgan); but there are other potential targets the boys have not considered, including a gangster (Harold Innocent) and some menacing Spaniards (Roger Delgado, Robert Russell et al).
24	"Someone Waiting"	Peter Medak	Terry Nation	25 February 1972	115
Pursuing a beautiful ingénue (Penelope Horner), Brett and Danny are drawn into a multi-faceted affair with deadly implications when Brett resumes his motor racing career and an unknown saboteur seeks to wreck the next race. Lois Maxwell plays a woman trying to fix Brett's race; she has no scenes with Moore.

== Home media ==
The entire series was remastered for DVD release in Europe in 2001.

In 2006, because of its popularity in Britain, a nine-disc DVD special edition boxed set was released, with extra material to the complete, uncut, re-mastered 24-episode series.

In September 2011, the Region B Blu-ray box set containing all remastered, restored episodes of The Persuaders! was released to considerable praise from reviewers.

In Region 1, A&E Home Video, under license from Carlton International Media Ltd., released the entire series of the classic '70s British cult adventure series on DVD in two volume sets in 2003/2004.

On 10 September 2014, it was announced that Visual Entertainment had acquired the rights to the series in Region 1 and would re-release all 24 episodes on DVD on 4 November 2014.

== Remake plan ==
A motion picture was announced in 2005 with Steve Coogan and Ben Stiller. In 2007 Hugh Grant and George Clooney were later announced as the stars with Stiller attached as producer. The film was slated for a December 2008 release, but was never completed.

== In popular culture ==
The John Barry theme tune was also used as the walk-on music by British 2 tone pioneers The Specials.

The series' theme song was sampled in the video for the single "Lavender" by Snoop Dogg. Fellow rapper Tyler, the Creator also sampled the theme song in his song, "Rise!", from Call Me If You Get Lost (2021). It was also used diegetically in the movie Nocturama, directed by Bertrand Bonello.
