= Reg Bundy =

British dancer and entertainer

Reginald Sutherland Bundy (26 May 1946 – 15 April 2003) was a British dancer, actor and television presenter best known for his drag persona H.I.H. (Her Imperial Highness) Regina Fong.

Bundy trained as a dancer. He worked on a number of stage musicals and appeared in the film The Slipper and the Rose (1976). He first achieved cult status as part of the cabaret troupe "The Disapointer Sisters".

Bundy first developed Regina Fong in 1985, and quickly achieved a regular spot at the Black Cap pub in Camden Town, London and also the Royal Vauxhall Tavern. The Fong character was a Russian princess who had escaped to Britain following the Russian Revolution, smuggling out three Fabergé eggs - a conceit which formed the basis of Bundy's show The Last of the Romanoffs, which premiered at the Edinburgh Festival and later ran at the Bloomsbury Theatre in London.

Regina's stage act entailed enthusiastic audience participation from her fans the "Fongettes", and used extracts from a variety of songs, TV shows, jingles, and sound effects. She was one of the regular hosts of London's Lesbian and Gay Pride Festival.

Bundy appeared in the Edinburgh and London productions of playwright Neil Bartlett's A Vision of Love Revealed in Sleep and Night After Night, and also appeared in the BBC Radio Four adaptation of Night After Night.

Regina Fong also appeared in the London production of Angels, Punks and Raging Queens in 1995.

TV appearances included Arena for the BBC and Club X for Channel 4.

Bundy died from cancer on 15 April 2003, aged 56. The funeral was held at Golders Green Crematorium, London.

== See also ==
- List of drag queens
