= Club X =

1989 British television series

Club X is a short-lived 1989 Channel 4 arts and music magazine programme that is often cited as an example of TV Hell.

== Details ==
The production and presentation team was largely taken from the earlier Channel 4 success Network 7 and had the same editor Charlie Parsons. At the time Club X was commissioned Channel 4's new Chief Executive Michael Grade was attempting to make the channel's cultural programming more accessible, a process regarded by some as dumbing down.

The Club X format was intended to blend items on relatively high-brow arts with the kind of quirky stories and items that had been features of Network 7, such as feminist pornography. Club X was broadcast live over 23 weeks from 26 April to 27 September 1989 in a Wednesday night 90-minute slot scheduled directly against BBC2's new arts magazine The Late Show, another production by Network 7 graduates. There was an edited repeat the following Sunday.

Fortunately the show's presenters led by Murray Boland and Martina Attille had live experience yet struggled bravely with the often spurious chaotic direction. The other presenters included drag artist Regina Fong and Fou Fou L Hunter. Hunter died mid-series (11 August 1989). In a reference to the then current Acid House scene the programme's set was modelled on the nightclub Heaven though the constant background music made it impossible for the presenters to hear cues and studio interviews were often inaudible while members of the audience occasionally interfered with the set ups. Each week was themed around an avant-garde art movement, Dada, Surrealism etc.

== Buygones ==
Club X was the first television work of Victor Lewis-Smith whose stand-alone segment Buygones featured humorous takes on withdrawn consumer items such as the Aztec Bar and OMO washing powder.

== Cancellation ==
An edited version of the Wednesday broadcast was shown at 14:00 the following Sunday. Although the edited version tidied up the presentation and removed the more graphic elements, the content remained the same and an off-colour remark about the dead comedian Eric Morecambe drew complaints. A second series was not commissioned; as Channel 4 had, unusually, produced the series in-house, the channel bore the full cost. This made it one of the most expensive failures in the company's history. Some elements such as 'Buygones' were recycled as stand-alone programmes or greatest hits compilations. Charlie Parsons went on to set up a production company with Waheed Ali, which then merged with Planet Pictures, which subsequently produced several shows including The Big Breakfast and "The Word".
