= Triangle (1981 TV series) =

BBC television series

- Main title caption for the series
- Genre: Soap opera
- Created by: Bill Sellars
- Directed by: Marc Miller; John Bird; Andrew Morgan; Darrol Blake; Terence Dudley
- Starring: Kate O'Mara; Larry Lamb; Michael Craig; Paul Jerricho
- Opening theme: Johnny Pearson
- Composer: Johnny Pearson
- Country of origin: United Kingdom
- No. of series: 3
- No. of episodes: 78

Production
- Producer: Bill Sellars
- Production location: MS Tor Scandinavia
- Running time: 25 minutes

Original release
- Network: BBC1
- Release: 5 January 1981 – 6 July 1983

Triangle is a BBC Television soap opera broadcast in the early 1980s, set aboard a North Sea ferry that sailed from Felixstowe to Gothenburg and Gothenburg to Amsterdam. A third imaginary leg existed between Amsterdam and Felixstowe to justify the programme's title, but this was not operated by the ferry company. The show ran for three series before being cancelled, but is still generally remembered as "some of the most mockable British television ever produced". The scripts involved clichéd relationships and stilted dialogue, making the show the butt of several jokes—particularly on Terry Wogan's morning Radio 2 programme—which caused some embarrassment to the BBC. BBC Classic sitcom Are You Being Served? in Season 8, Episode 1 "Is It Catching?", hinted at the show being nausea-inducing for more reasons than just its setting. Even the anarchic BBC sitcom The Young Ones poked fun at the series, when one character says, "Even Triangle has better furniture than this!"

In 1992, the BBC screened TV Hell, an evening of programming devoted to the worst that television had to offer, and the first episode of Triangle was broadcast as part of the line-up.

The ferry used in the first series was the Tor Line's MS Tor Scandinavia. This was replaced in the second and third series by the DFDS vessel Dana Anglia (DFDS having acquired Tor Line by this time), probably because she had a less intensive schedule, and the longer time she spent in port made on-board filming easier.

== Production limitations ==
Interviewed for a TV Hell segment in 1992, the show's producer, Bill Sellars, and the leading actor, Larry Lamb, spoke of several problems with the show's production.

Using a ferry as the setting for a television series had originally looked like a promising idea. The regular cast, playing the crew, could be joined by a constantly changing guest cast playing the passengers as the ship sailed to interesting European locations (a format used in the American series The Love Boat). Advances in portable video cameras and recording equipment meant that the show could be videotaped on board a real ferry with more realism than using studio sets and more cheaply than using the 16mm film that was normal for location television drama at the time.

Unfortunately, the plan was revealed to be flawed almost as soon as location shooting—largely conducted in the North Sea—began. The inclement weather made the exterior scenes appear gloomy and dull, and far from glamorous. In making the first episode, Kate O'Mara had to endure a scene in which she sunbathes topless on a clearly freezing deck.

Another problem involved lighting. The cameras were perfectly comfortable with either natural or artificial lighting conditions, but a mixture of the two always produced unnatural-looking colour. The video cameras of the day did not cope well with contrasting light levels between inside and outside, so interior scenes often had to be shot with the windows or portholes curtained—so that as far as the audience was concerned they might as well have been shot in a studio anyway.

The relatively new "electronic field production" portable video technology (used for location footage in place of the traditional 16mm film) also exhibited serious problems—owing to, amongst other things, the movement of the ship which disrupted the stability of the video recorders. Rough seas also induced seasickness in many of the production crew, making shooting an uncomfortable experience.

== Broadcasts ==
The programme was broadcast every Monday and Wednesday.

Series	Episodes	Originally released	
Series	Episodes	First released	Last released
1	26	5 January 1981	1 April 1981
2	26	26 April 1982	20 July 1982
3	26	5 April 1983	6 July 1983

== Cast ==
Michael Craig and Larry Lamb were the only cast members to appear in all 78 episodes of Triangle. Kate O'Mara left at the beginning of the second series.

Starring

- Michael Craig – Captain John Anderson
- Larry Lamb – Matt Taylor
- Kate O'Mara – Katherine Laker
- Paul Jerricho – Charles Woodhouse

Recurring cast listed alphabetically:

- Dawn Addams – Mrs. Landers
- Tony Anholt – Nick Stevens
- David Arlen – Joe Francis
- Peter Arne – Kevin Warrender
- George Baker – David West
- Helena Breck – Sandy McCormick
- Dennis Burgess – George Terson
- Julia Chambers – Barbara Carter
- Diana Coupland – Marion Terson
- Sandra Dickinson – Penny Warrender
- Scott Fredericks – Tom Kelly
- Joan Greenwood – Judith Harper
- Philip Hatton – Tony Grant
- Penelope Horner – Sarah Hallam
- Elizabeth Larner – Jo Bailey
- Nicolette McKenzie – Maya Anderson
- Wanda Moore – Susan Porter
- Jonathan Newth – Roger Powell
- Cindy O'Callaghan – Linda Kennedy
- Jonathan Owen – Peter Nuttall
- Marion Owen Smith – Lisa Watkins
- Sandra Payne – Christine Harris
- Jamie Roberts – Bill Ryan
- Christopher Saul – Douglas Evans
- Jonathan Scott-Taylor – Ted Anderson
- Doug Sheldon – Arthur Parker
- Nigel Stock – Wally James
