= Lunch with Marlene =

Lunch with Marlene is a stage comedy written by Chris Burgess. It is based on the friendship of acting legends Marlene Dietrich and Noël Coward. The two were respectively portrayed by Kate O'Mara and Frank Barrie in the play's original London production, which ran at the New End Theatre from 28 March 2008 through 27 April 2008. Musical direction and arrangements by Neil MacDonald who also played the role of the waiter and pianist. Reviews for the production were generally positive, with The New York Times commenting that the play is "far from perfect, yet it is hugely likeable."

== Plot ==
The first act takes place in a restaurant in London in 1970, in which Dietrich and Coward meet for lunch. Dietrich seeks Coward's advice on whether or not to write an autobiography, for which she has already accepted and spent an advance payment. The two former stars reminisce and discuss Dietrich's experiences as a German American during World War II. The second act presents a musical revue, including such songs as "Don't Let's Be Beastly to the Germans", "See What the Boys in the Back Room Will Have", and "Where Have All the Flowers Gone?".

== Reception ==
The original London production, which ran at the New End Theatre from 28 March 2008 through 27 April 2008, received "rave reviews". The Daily Telegraph called the production a "delightful reconstruction of one of their meetings" and called the musical revue a "further treat". The New York Times said the production was "far from perfect, yet it is hugely likeable" and that the "fascinating" biographical details were at times "awkwardly inserted". The Stage also called the dialogue "fascinating" and the casting "impeccable", though the direction by Steward Nicholls "lacked intimacy".
