= The Strange World of Gurney Slade =

1960 British TV comedy series

- Genre: Comedy; Surreal humour Surrealism; Meta humour
- Created by: Anthony Newley
- Written by: Dick Hills and Sid Green
- Starring: Anthony Newley
- Theme music composer: Max Harris
- Country of origin: United Kingdom
- Original language: English
- No. of series: 1
- No. of episodes: 6

Production
- Production company: ATV

Original release
- Network: ITV
- Release: 22 October – 26 November 1960

The Strange World of Gurney Slade is a surreal six-part British television comedy series devised by Anthony Newley and made by ATV, first transmitted by the ITV network between 22 October and 26 November 1960. Newley devised the central concept of the show, whereas the series was written in its entirety by Dick Hills and Sid Green.

== Plot ==
The series follows the character of Gurney Slade, played by Newley, through a series of mundane environments with fantastical elements. Slade is the only continuing character, and is often heard in voice-over expressing his thoughts. Though we learn much about the character's inner life, we learn very little of Gurney Slade's history or background. He appears to be a character in a typical family-oriented TV show who abruptly tires of the artificial environment he's apparently trapped in; the first episode opens with Slade breaking the fourth wall of a television sitcom and leaving the set, to the protestations of its director.

Slade spends the rest of the series simply wandering from one (generally sparse) environment to another, ruminating on life in an often free-associative way. During his wanderings, he encounters a range of odd people (and at least one talking dog), all of whom may be figments of his imagination. In episode four, Slade is put on trial for being a TV character who wasn't funny in the first three episodes. Other episodes introduce other meta-fictional elements into the proceedings. The series concludes with a final episode in which Slade, in a TV studio, appears to be little more than a machine-like performer whose every move is controlled by outside forces.

== Production ==
=== Development ===
Prior success as a pop vocalist led Anthony Newley to be offered the opportunity, and a free hand, to create a six-part comedy series for ITV in collaboration with scriptwriters Dick Hills and Sid Green. Unusually for a comedy show on British television, the series was shot entirely on 35 mm film; the first three episodes (bar the opening scene of the series) were shot on location, while the rest of the series was studio-bound.

Newley explained at the time: "There is no rhyme or reason for what I do, I merely take life and turn it upside down. We hope to achieve humour without setting out to be deliberately funny." The surrealism of the series was considerably ahead of its time for a 1960 television comedy. In a New Musical Express (NME) interview during 1973, David Bowie described the series as "tremendous", commenting that "there's a lot of Monty Python in there - left-handed screws and right-handed screws".

The name Gurney Slade is taken from the name of a district (and limestone quarry) in the Mendip Hills in Somerset, England, not far from the city of Wells. Having recently passed through the area, Newley remembered the name at an early meeting, after a number of proposed titles – including Up the Zambezi – were rejected. The series was produced by Alan Tarrant, who directed the series with, in an uncredited rôle, Newley himself. There is also a 1944 novel by Warwick Deeping called Mr Gurney and Mr Slade, also known as The Cleric's Secret.

=== Theme tune ===
An arrangement of the show's theme tune, which featured a prominent flute part, by composer Max Harris was released on a 7" single together with the "Gurney in Wonderland" theme from episode 1. The theme's main piano jazz riff bears a strong resemblance to Mose Allison's version of "Parchman Farm" recorded in 1957. The single version was later utilised for the "animated clock" sequence on the BBC children's show Vision On.

== Cast ==
- Anthony Newley as Gurney Slade
- Edwin Richfield as Husband
- Dilys Laye as Wife
- Douglas Wilmer as Prosecuting Counsel
- Charles Lloyd Pack as Tinker
- John Bennett as Napoleon Bonaparte
- Anneke Wills as Girl on Airfield
- Bernie Winters as Albert
- Geoffrey Palmer as Television Studio Floor Manager (episode 1)
- Una Stubbs as Vacuum Cleaner Girl/Girl in Park (2 episodes)
- Hugh Paddick as Fairy (episode 2)
- Graham Stark as Fairy (episode 6)

== Broadcast ==
The ratings were disappointing, and it was moved from primetime to a late-night 'graveyard' timeslot by ITV. Some sources claim that it was moved after the first episode had been broadcast, but the published television schedules of the time indicate that the first two episodes were broadcast at 8:35 pm, while episodes 3 through 6 were broadcast at 11:10 pm. The Strange World of Gurney Slade was repeated in 1963, and the first episode turned up as part of Channel 4's TV Heaven series in 1992. Rewind TV broadcast the entire series in May–June 2025.

== Home media ==
The whole series was released as a Region 2 DVD by Network DVD in August 2011. A Blu-Ray was released in 2020.

== Critical works ==
In September 2020, Obverse Books published the book The Strange World of Gurney Slade, by author Andrew Hickey, as the sixth volume of its Silver Archive series of monographs on genre television.
