= TV Heaven =

British television series

TV Heaven is a series of 13 theme nights shown on Channel 4 in early 1992, celebrating the best of archive British television, which was hosted by Frank Muir. Twelve of the evenings each focused on programmes from a particular year from the 1960s or 1970s, with one evening focussing on programmes from the 1950s.

== Broadcast form ==
Each evening featured three, four or five complete programmes, most of which were originally shown on ITV and which were repeated with their idents intact.

Several short features bookended the programmes; Opening Shots was a compilation of title sequences from the year concerned, A Choice of Viewing was a montage of clips from other programmes, and Where Were They Then? showcased a clip of a subsequently famous person early in their career. A selection of advertisements were shown; these would have been screened in the year in focus, but some did not necessarily originate from the years to which they were attributed, although most did.

The programmes and clips were linked by Frank Muir and the links between programmes produced by Illuminations Productions for Channel 4.

== Programmes ==
The complete programmes shown were as follows:

8 February 1992 – 1967:

- At Last the 1948 Show (with John Cleese, Graham Chapman, Tim Brooke-Taylor)
- Coronation Street - Elsie Tanner's Wedding
- Armchair Theatre - "A Magnum for Schneider" (the source of Callan)
- The Frost Programme - Emil Savundra

15 February 1992 – 1963:

- This Week - Satire
- The Lover (by Harold Pinter)
- The Avengers - "Gilded Cage"

22 February 1992 – 1974:

- Thick as Thieves - "The Homecoming"
- Regan (the pilot of The Sweeney)
- This Week - The National Front

29 February 1992 – 1965:

- The Saint - "The Scorpion"
- The Woody Allen Show
- The Human Jungle - "Struggle for a Mind"
- Tempo - "A Tale of Two Talents"

7 March 1992 – 1971:

- Six Dates With Barker "The Odd Job"
- Upstairs, Downstairs - "On Trial" (colour version)
- The Persuaders - "Overture"

14 March 1992 – 1978:

- Edward and Mrs. Simpson - "The Abdication"
- The South Bank Show - Ken Dodd
- Rumpole of the Bailey - "Rumpole and the Younger Generation"

21 March 1992 – 1970:

- On the Buses
- The Tribe That Hides From Man
- Manhunt - "Intent to Steal"

28 March 1992 – 1960:

- Police Surgeon - "Easy Money"
- Living for Kicks with Daniel Farson
- Armchair Theatre - "Lena, O My Lena" (by Alun Owen)
- The Strange World of Gurney Slade (with Anthony Newley)

4 April 1992 – 1969:

- Galton and Simpson Comedy - "An Extra Bunch of Daffodils"
- Randall and Hopkirk (Deceased) - "My Late Lamented Friend and Partner"
- Johnny Cash in San Quentin

11 April 1992 – 1976:

- The Fosters - "God's Business is Good Business"
- Ready When You Are, Mr McGill (by Jack Rosenthal)
- Bouquet of Barbed Wire - "Repercussions"
- Aquarius - Reggae

18 April 1992 – 1950s:

- Oh Boy! (the last original edition from 1959)
- The Bob Monkhouse Hour (1959)
- Double Your Money with Hughie Green (the first edition from 1955)
- The Adventures of Robin Hood - "The Moneylender" (1955)
- Dial 999 - "The Killing Job" (1957)

25 April 1992 – 1966:

- George and the Dragon - "George Meets the Dragon"
- Dare I Weep, Dare I Mourn
- Danger Man - "The Paper Chase"

2 May 1992 – 1968:

- Please Sir!
- The World of Whicker (with Alan Whicker) - "The Cats Eyes Man"
- Do Not Adjust Your Set (with Eric Idle, Michael Palin, Terry Jones, David Jason, The Bonzo Dog Doo-Dah Band)
- The Prisoner - "The Girl Who Was Death"

== See also ==
- TV Hell
