= Frank Barrie =

English actor (1936–2025)

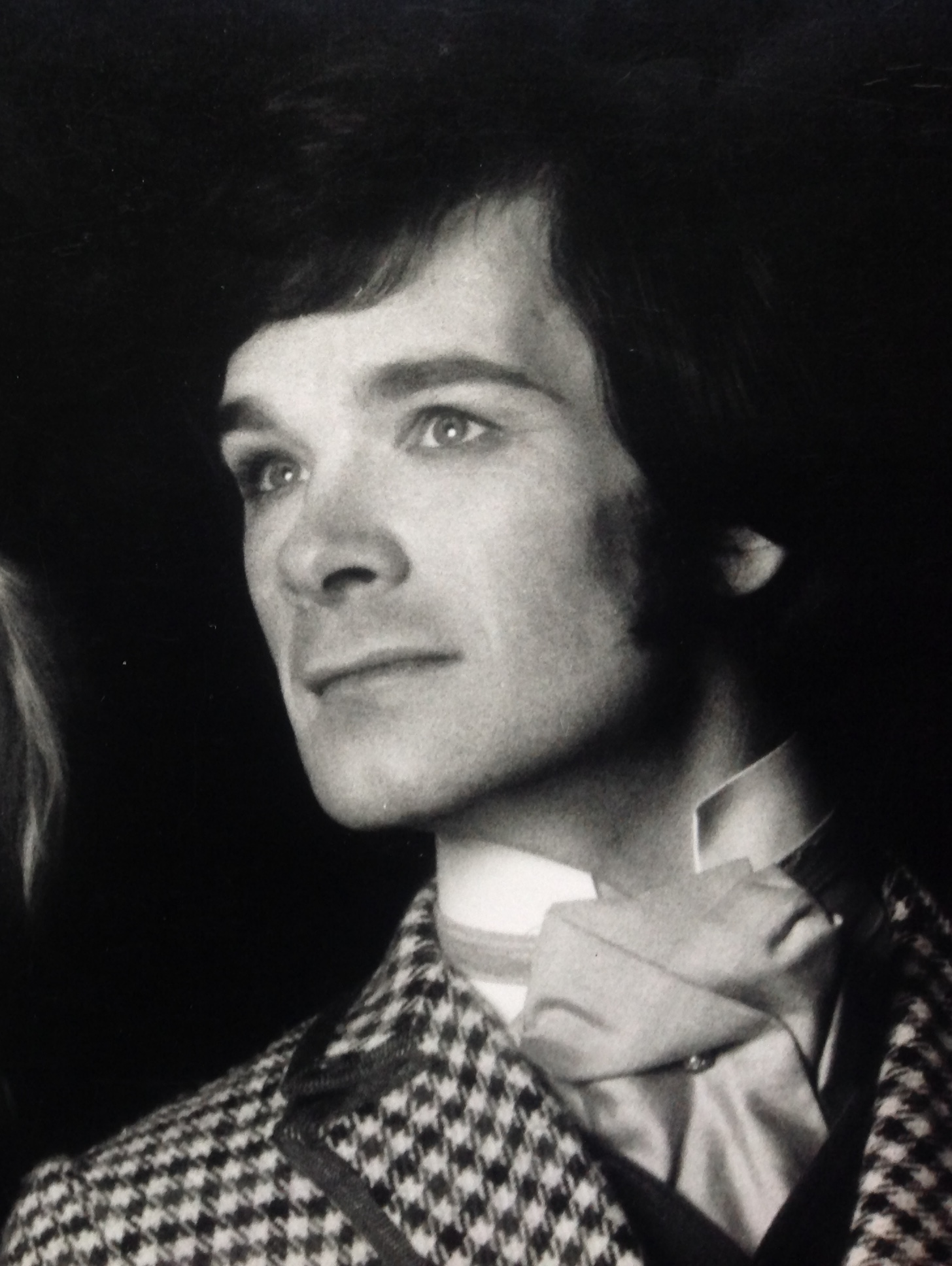
- Barrie performing The Merchant of Venice in 1971
- Born: Frank Smith; 19 September 1936; Scarborough, North Riding of Yorkshire, England
- Died: 30 June 2025 (aged 88)
- Education: Archbishop Holgate's School; University of Hull
- Occupation: Actor
- Years active: 1959–2025
- Spouse: Mary Ann Lloyd (m. 1960)
- Children: 1

Frank Smith (19 September 1936 – 30 June 2025), known professionally as Frank Barrie, was an English actor, director and writer. He made his acting debut in 1959 in a production of Henry IV, Part 2, at the York Theatre Royal. He was a successful Shakespearean actor throughout his career. In 2008 he starred in Lunch with Marlene, a tribute to Noël Coward and Marlene Dietrich, and in 2010 was cast as Edward Bishop in EastEnders.

== Early life ==
Barrie was born Frank Smith on 19 September 1936 in Scarborough, North Riding of Yorkshire, to Arthur and Annie (née Carter) Smith but spent his childhood in York. He attended Archbishop Holgate's School there, before going to Hull University, where he was elected President of the Debating Union.

== Theatre ==
After graduating Barrie spent four years acting in weekly and fortnightly repertory, before joining the internationally prestigious Bristol Old Vic company in 1965, where he quickly became established as the leading man – the youngest in the company's history. Amongst his many roles he played Oedipus Rex; Richard Il; Long John Silver; Alfie; Malvolio; and Lucio in Tyrone Guthrie's production of Measure for Measure. His performance of Mercutio in Romeo and Juliet was highly praised. Harold Hobson wrote in The Sunday Times of the "splendidly manly and romantic Mercutio of Frank Barrie. Few Mercutios can have lived with a more rousing swagger or died with more panache or bitterness than Mr Barrie's".

In 1967 Barrie toured the United States and Europe with the Company, repeating his Mercutio and Lucio on Broadway, New York, and in many other major cities.

In 1969 he was invited by Laurence Olivier to join the National Theatre. Over the next four years he played many leading roles with Olivier's company, including Mirabell in The Way of the World opposite Geraldine McEwan. His performance as Wendoll in John Dexter's production of A Woman Killed with Kindness opposite Joan Plowright drew favourable reviews. The Stage noted that "Frank Barrie is an excellent Wendoll", and that he gave a "characterisation of richness and power". He also appeared as Brachiano in The White Devil, Barelli in The Rules of the Game with Paul Scofield; Ganya in The Idiot with Derek Jacobi; Desmoulins in Danton's Death with Christopher Plummer; and Bassanio to Olivier's Shylock. He was the first member of the Bristol Old Vic to star at the Young Vic, where he won wide critical acclaim as Byron in The Naked Peacock. The production was described by critic Irving Wardle as having "a notably Byronic performance by Frank Barrie; a romantically virile figure whose wolfish mouth offers a constant threat of blisteringly destructive irony".

Later leading London appearances include A Midsummer Night's Dream at the Open Air Theatre, Regent's Park, where he played Oberon opposite Linda Thorson as Titania. His performance as Crichton in the 1977 staging of The Admirable Crichton at the Greenwich Theatre drew favourable comment, with the Daily Telegraph commenting that "Frank Barrie as Crichton gives every impression that beneath the stiff butler's uniform, there beats the heart of a true intelligent being". He also appeared as Arthur Kipps in The Woman in Black, which was staged at The Fortune theatre; Lord Rosebery in Motherdear opposite Margaret Lockwood at The Ambassadors and Janacek at The Royal Festival Hall; He also played Braham in The Philanthropist at Wyndham's and Major Ross in The Crucifer of Blood at the Haymarket.

Barrie was the author of his one man show, Macready!, the story of the great Victorian actor William Macready, which came to the West End in 1981 after a triumphant run in New York and was filmed by the Bright Thoughts Company for Channel 4. For this performance he was nominated "best actor" in the London Critics Plays and Players Awards. Barrie performed Macready! worldwide, in a record breaking 65 countries, including Australia when in 1982 he represented Great Britain in the Commonwealth Games Arts Festival in Brisbane.

In 1991 he appeared at the Theatre Royal, Windsor in The Philanthropist. In 1995 he played the title role in a later production of Jeffrey Bernard Is Unwell, with The Stage commenting that "the central performance by Frank Barrie is finely placed and impeccably played".

In 2008, Barrie was cast as Noël Coward in the original London production of Lunch with Marlene, a play about the friendship between Coward and fellow acting legend Marlene Dietrich. The production received "rave reviews", with the casting of Barrie as Coward being described as "impeccable" by The Stage.

Barrie also had considerable experience as a director, including productions of Shylock, J. M. Barrie, and The Life and Loves of Edith Wharton, all of which toured internationally. His writing credits include Wellington, The Family at Ham, The Devil You Know, and The Other Woman, the last of which was broadcast by the BBC, starring Dame Thora Hird.

In May 2022 he appeared as Flashman at 80 – celebrating the character's fictional bicentennial.

== Television ==
Barrie also appeared in over 150 British television productions, including such shows as Emergency Ward 10, No Hiding Place, Softly, Softly, Special Branch, On Giant's Shoulders, The Ghosts of Motley Hall and Queen of Swords.

In 1983 Barrie played Eglamour in the BBC Television Shakespeare adaptation of The Two Gentlemen of Verona.

Barrie appeared in the BBC One soap opera EastEnders as Edward Bishop in 2010 and 2011, a local choir master who becomes Dot Branning's (June Brown) gentleman friend.

== Personal life and death ==
At Hull, he met his future wife Mary Ann Lloyd. They married in 1960 and had a daughter.

Barrie died at his home on 30 June 2025, aged 88.

== Gallery ==
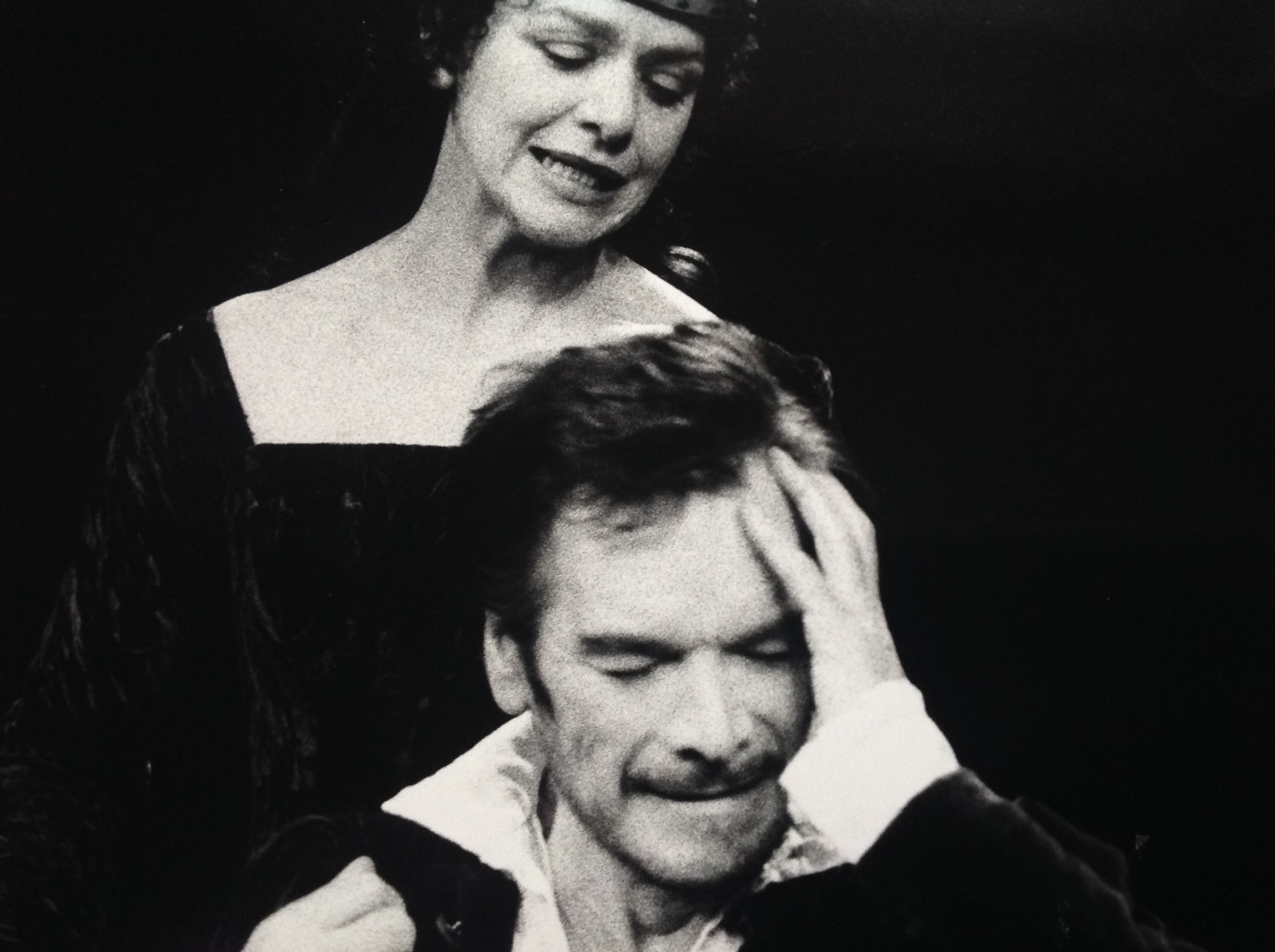
Frank Barrie as Macbeth, Lis Bell as Lady Macbeth

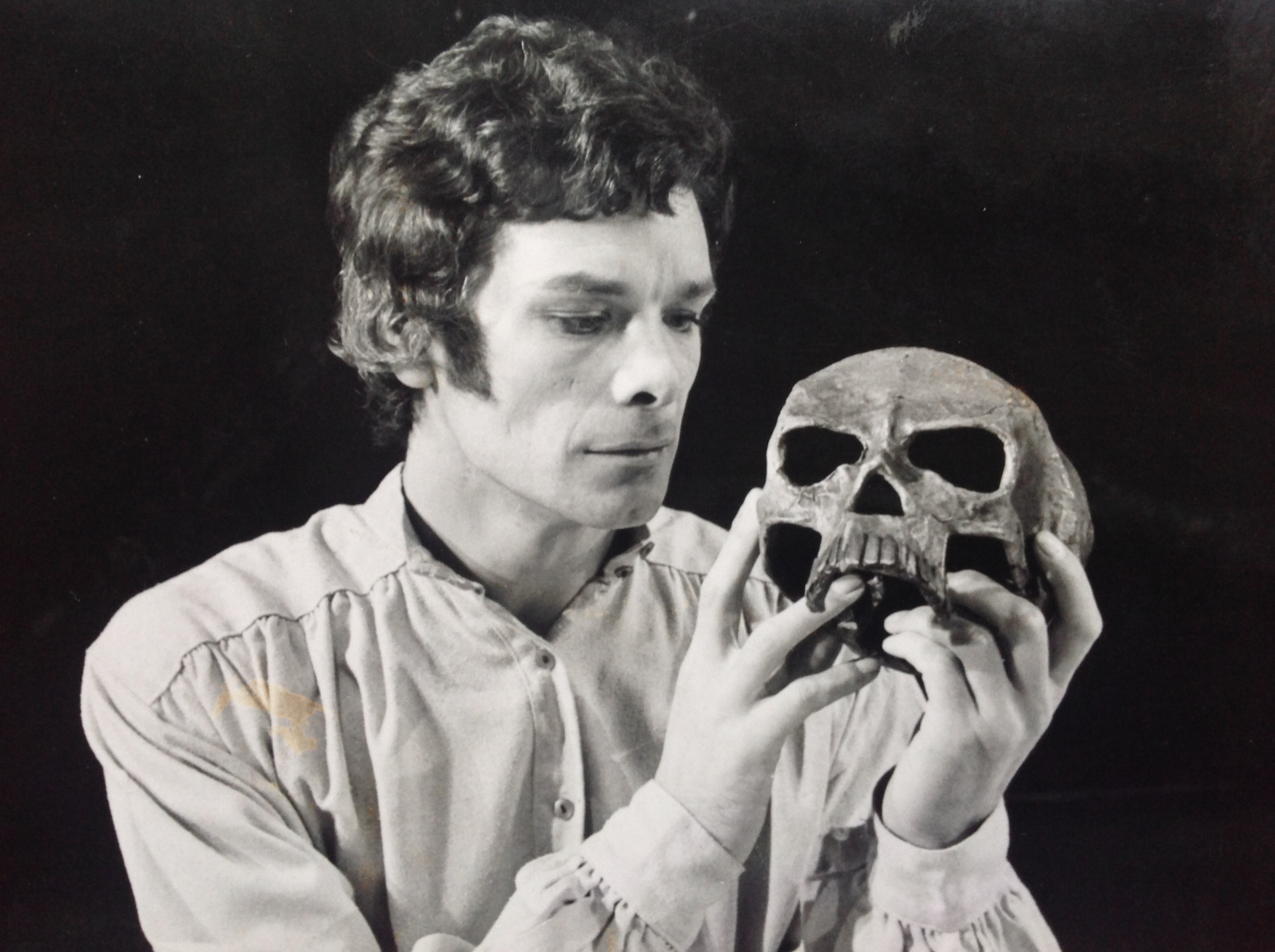
Frank Barrie as Hamlet, York Theatre Royal 1974

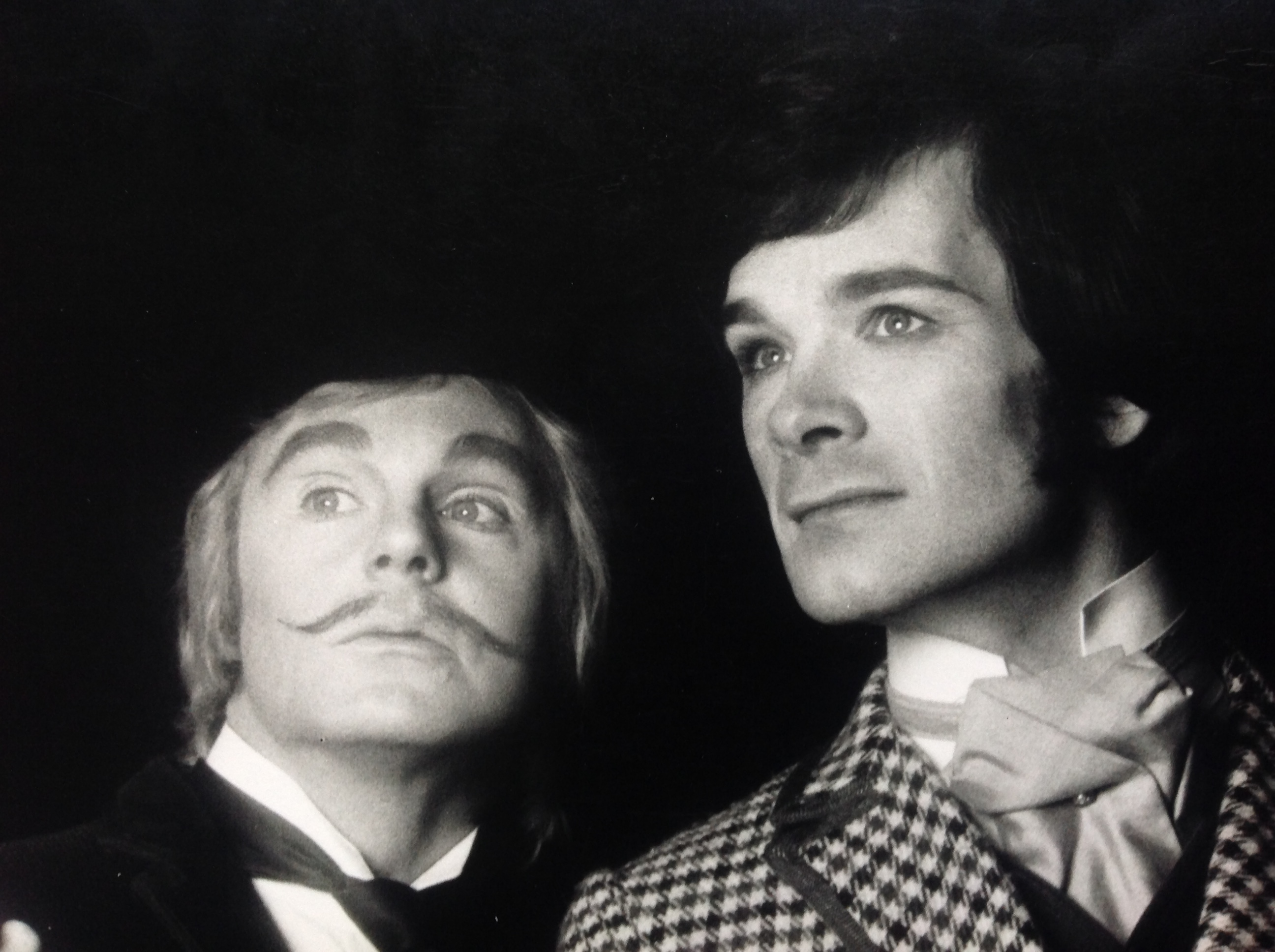
Frank Barrie and Derek Jacobi in The Merchant of Venice

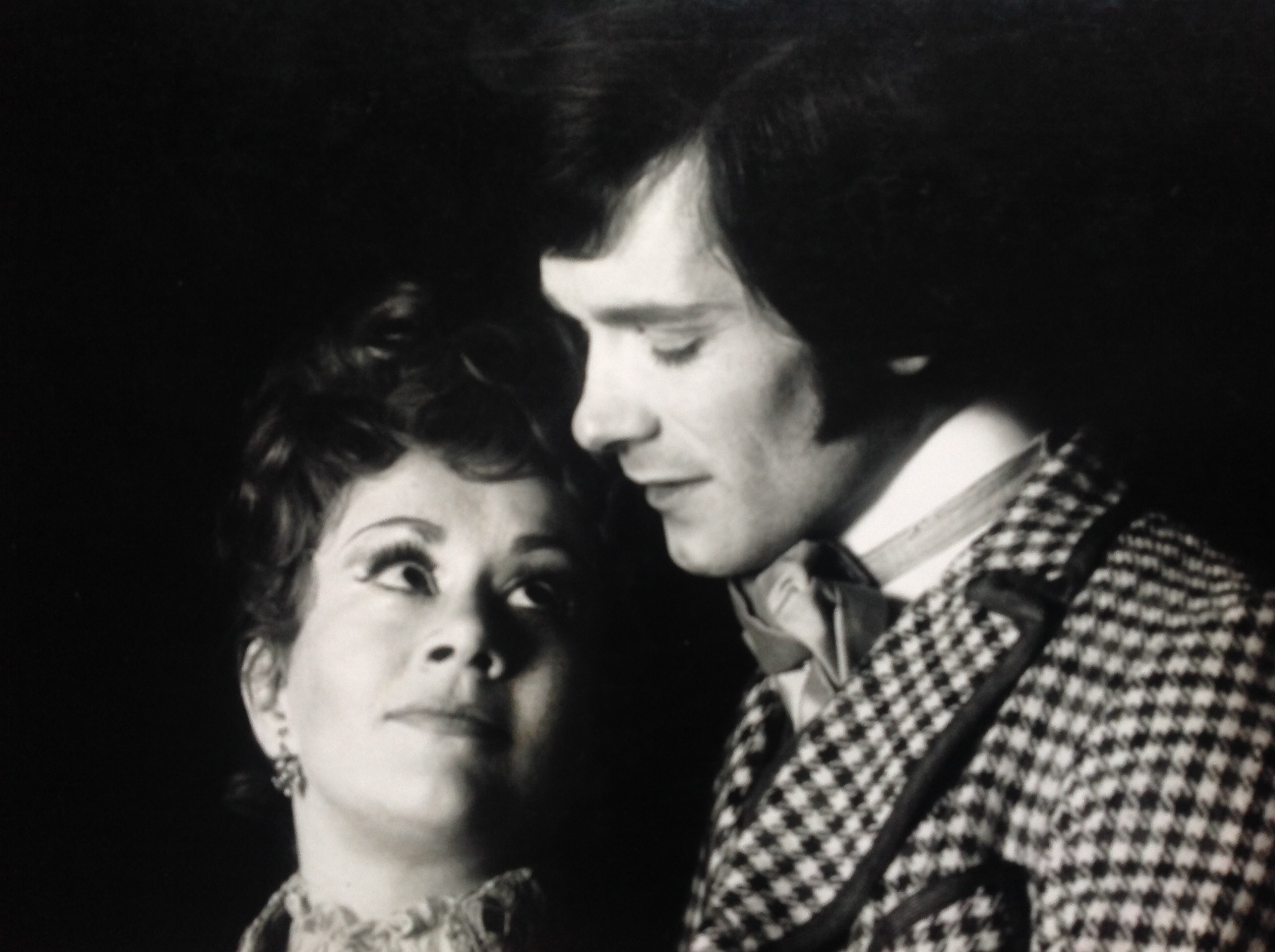
Frank Barrie and Joan Plowright

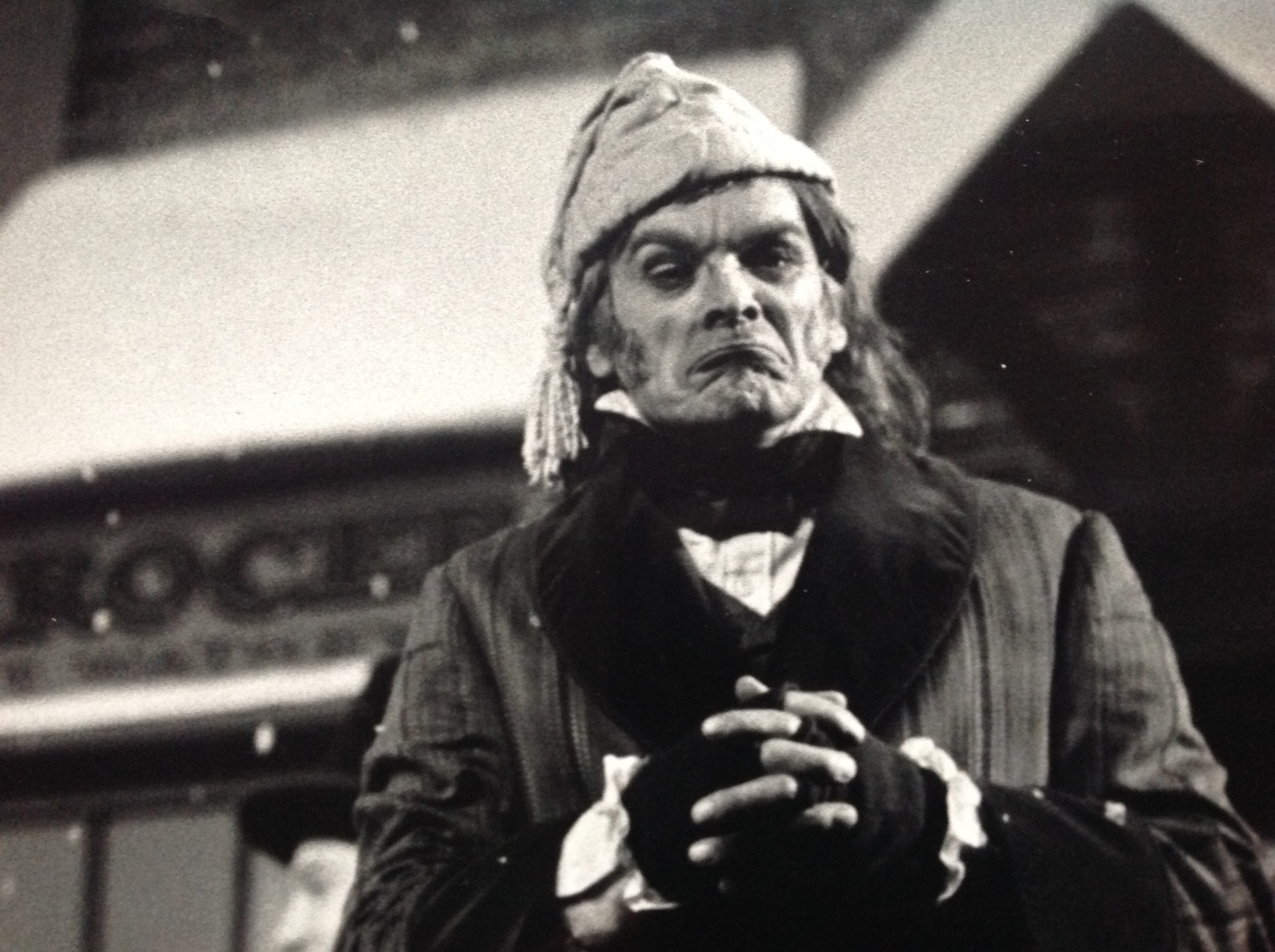
Frank Barrie as Scrooge

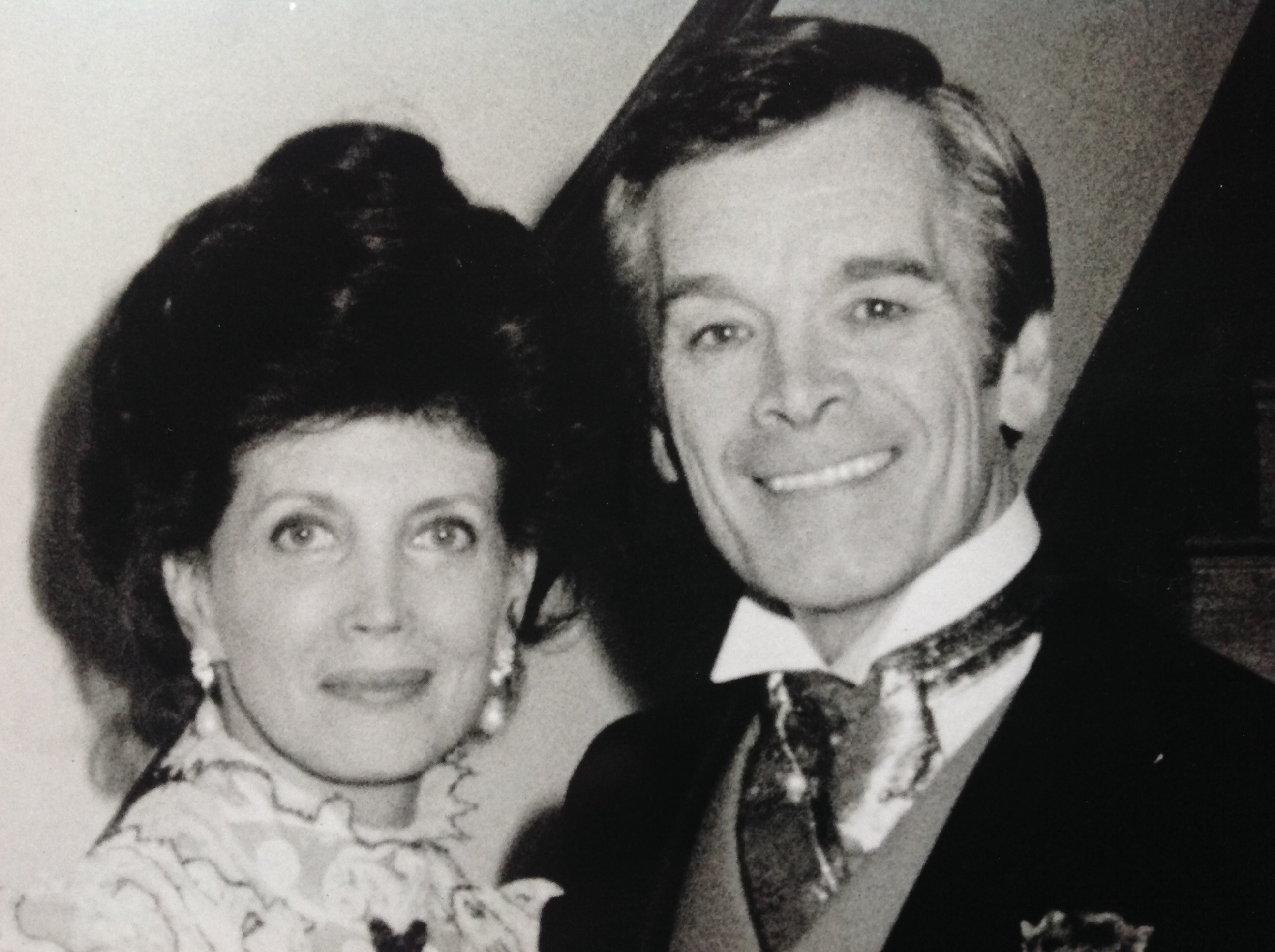
Frank Barrie and Gayle Hunnicutt in The Lives and Loves of Edith Wharton

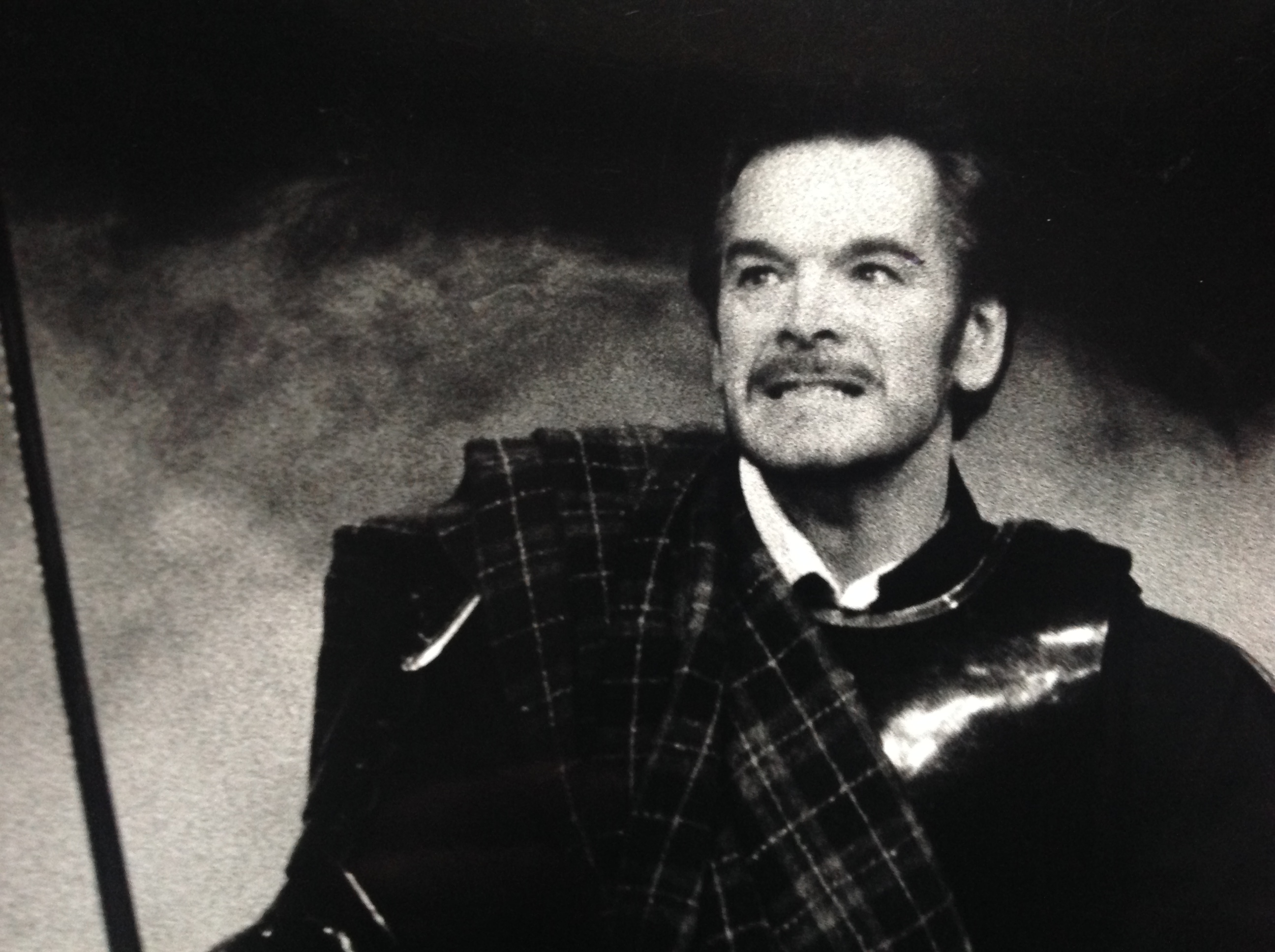
Frank Barrie as Macbeth

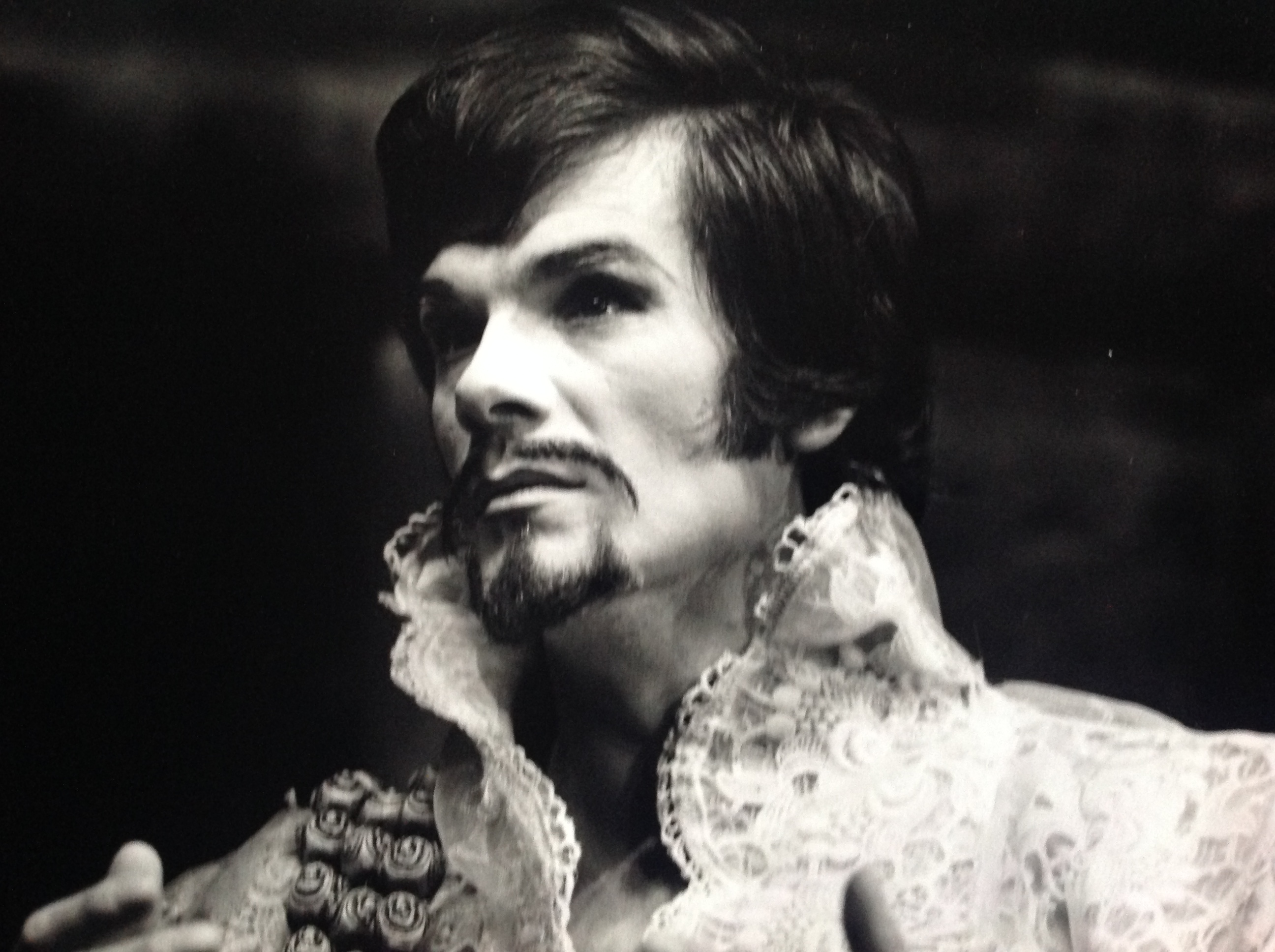
Frank Barrie as Brachiano in The White Devil
