= Kate O'Mara =

English actress (1939–2014)

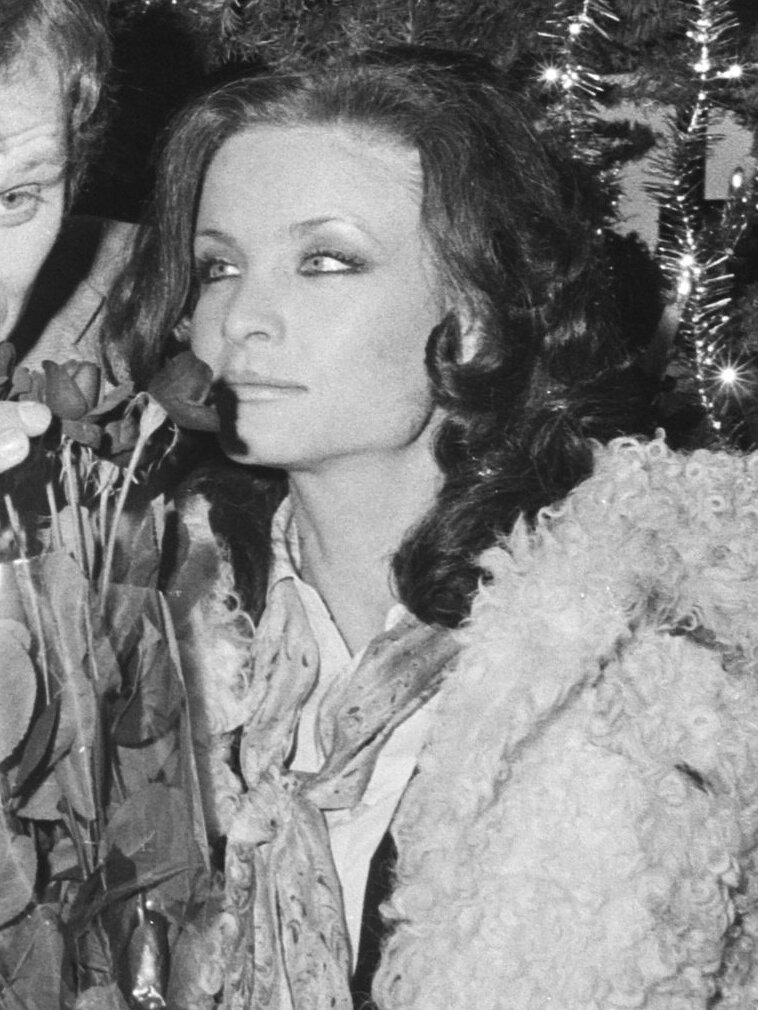
- O'Mara in 1977
- Born: Frances Meredith Carroll; 10 August 1939; Leicester, Leicestershire, England
- Died: 30 March 2014 (aged 74); Worthing, Sussex, England
- Occupations: Actress, writer
- Years active: 1956–2012
- Known for: The Vampire Lovers; The Horror of Frankenstein; The Rani in Doctor Who; Dynasty; The Brothers
- Spouses: Jeremy Young (m. 1971; div. 1976); Richard Willis (m. 1993; div. 1996)
- Children: 2
- Relatives: Belinda Carroll (sister)

Kate O'Mara (born Frances Meredith Carroll; 10 August 1939 – 30 March 2014) was an English film, stage and television actress, and writer. O'Mara made her stage debut in a 1963 production of The Merchant of Venice. Her other stage roles included Elvira in Blithe Spirit (1974), Katherina in The Taming of the Shrew (1978 and 1982), Lady Macbeth in Macbeth (1982), Cleopatra in Antony and Cleopatra (1982), Goneril in King Lear (1987), and Marlene Dietrich in Lunch with Marlene (2008).

In the cinema, O'Mara acted in two 1970 Hammer Horror films: The Vampire Lovers and The Horror of Frankenstein. On BBC television, she had regular roles in The Brothers (1975–1976), Triangle (1981–1982) and Howards' Way (1989–1990), and portrayed Doctor Who villain The Rani three times (1985, 1987, 1993). She also appeared as Jackie Stone in two episodes of the sitcom Absolutely Fabulous (1995–2003) and as Virginia O'Kane in four episodes of the prison drama Bad Girls (2001). On American television, she played Caress Morell, the scheming sister of Alexis Colby in the primetime soap opera Dynasty (1986).

== Early life and career ==
O'Mara was born, in Leicester, Leicestershire, to John F. Carroll, an RAF flying instructor, and actress Hazel Bainbridge (born Edith Marion Bainbridge; 25 January 1910 – 7 January 1998). Her younger sister is actress Belinda Carroll. After boarding school, she attended art school before becoming a full-time actress. O'Mara made her stage debut in a production of The Merchant of Venice in 1963, although her first film role was some years earlier (under the name Merrie Carroll) in Home and Away (1956) with Jack Warner, as her father, and Kathleen Harrison.

O’Mara's earliest television appearances, in the 1960s, included guest roles in Danger Man, Adam Adamant Lives!, The Saint, Z-Cars and The Avengers. In 1970, she appeared in two Hammer Studio horror films: The Vampire Lovers and The Horror of Frankenstein. In the former, she had an erotically charged scene with Ingrid Pitt, in which O'Mara was meant to be seduced; the two women were left laughing on set, however, as Pitt's fangs kept falling into O'Mara's cleavage. O'Mara's work in The Vampire Lovers impressed Hammer enough for them to offer her a contract, which she turned down, fearful of being typecast.

Her first major TV role was as Julia Main, wife of the main protagonist in the ITV series The Main Chance (1969). She had a regular role in the BBC drama series The Brothers (1975–1976) as Jane Maxwell, and in the early 1980s, O'Mara starred in the BBC soap opera Triangle (1981–1982), sometimes counted among the worst television series ever made. She played the villainous Rani in Doctor Who in two serials, The Mark of the Rani (1985) and Time and the Rani (1987), and also in the Doctor Who 30th anniversary spoof Dimensions in Time (1993), part of the Children in Need charity event. She also appeared, through archival footage, in the 2025 episode "Wish World".

Between these appearances in Doctor Who, she auditioned for a leading role as one of the sisters on the American primetime soap The Colbys, a spin-off of the American prime time soap opera Dynasty. Eventually, O'Mara was offered one of the roles alongside Stephanie Beacham, but declined since was still under contract with a production of stage play Light Up the Sky at the Old Vic Theatre. Shortly after, she was offered the part of Caress Morell on Dynasty. As the sister of Alexis Colby (Joan Collins), O'Mara appeared in 17 episodes of the sixth season and four episodes of the seventh during 1986. "We had a tremendous bitchy tension between us", the actress recalled about performing opposite Collins. "My character Caress was like an annoying little mosquito who just kept coming back and biting her". O'Mara disliked living in California, preferring the change of seasons in Britain, and to her relief was released from her five-year contract after Collins told the producers that having two brunettes in the series was a bad idea. After returning to the UK, she was cast as another scheming villain, Laura Wilde, in the BBC soap Howards' Way (1989–1990).

== Later life and career ==
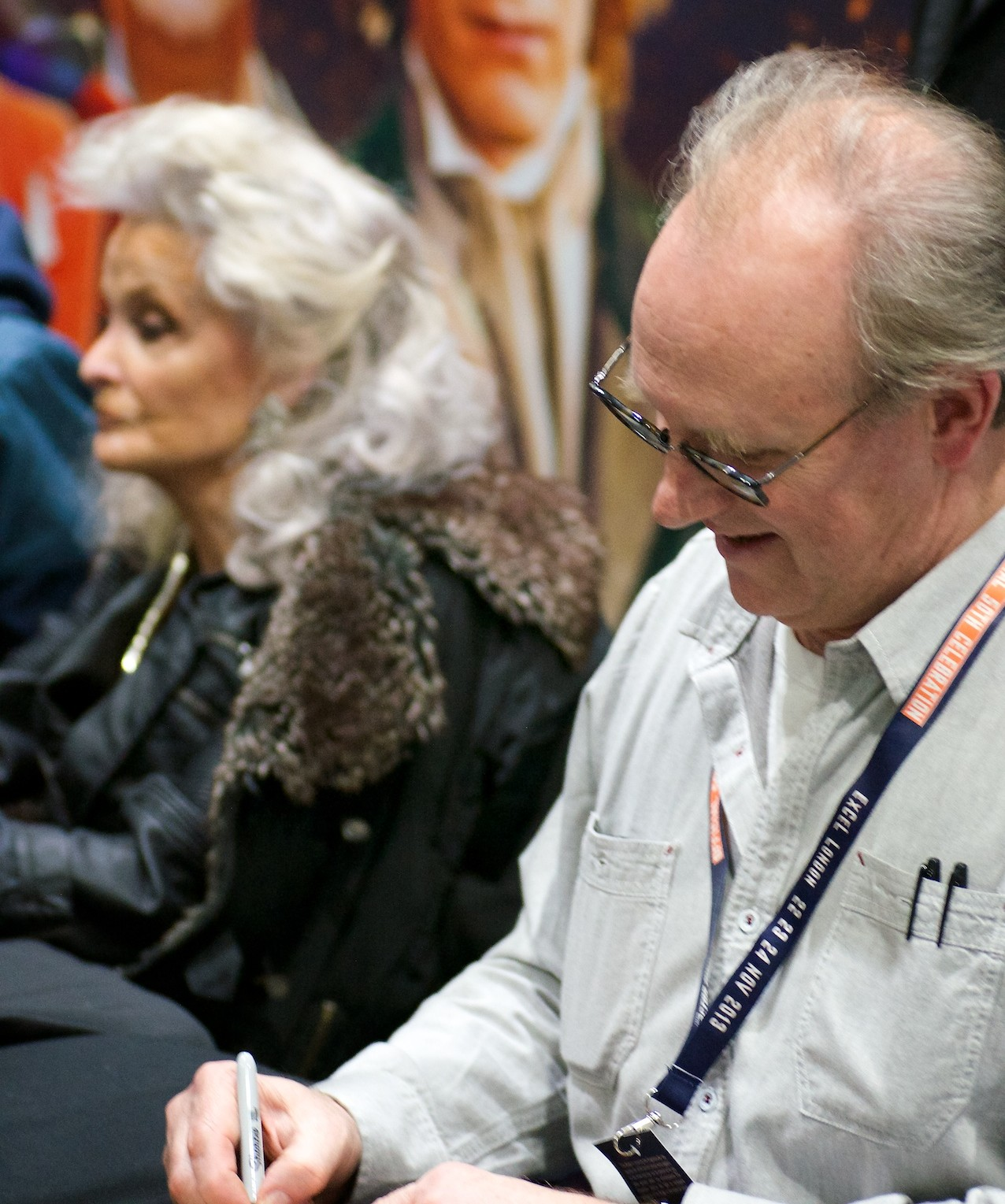
O'Mara and Peter Davison at the Doctor Who 50th Anniversary Celebration Weekend, November 2013

O'Mara spoke on several occasions about her experience with the casting couch. On an episode of The Word in 1994, O'Mara claimed that American producer Judd Bernard pulled down her panties during a hotel-room audition for the Elvis Presley vehicle Double Trouble. In her autobiography Vamp Until Ready: A Life Laid Bare, O'Mara described this incident and "many other close encounters with ... this very unpleasant and humiliating procedure", including with a well-known television casting director, the boss of Associated Television at ATV Elstree Studios, and the director of Great Catherine.

O'Mara continued to make television appearances throughout the 1990s, including Cluedo (1990), and playing Jackie Stone (Patsy's older sister) in two episodes of Absolutely Fabulous (1995–2003). In 2001, she had a recurring role in the ITV prison drama series Bad Girls before appearing in the short-lived revival of the soap opera Crossroads. She continued to perform on stage, and in March 2008 she played Marlene Dietrich in a stage play entitled Lunch with Marlene. From August to November 2008, she was cast as Mrs Cheveley in Oscar Wilde's stage play An Ideal Husband, directed by Peter Hall and produced by Bill Kenwright. She also performed in radio and audio plays. In 2000, she reprised her role as the Rani in the BBV Productions audio play The Rani Reaps the Whirlwind, and in 2006 she made a guest appearance in the radio comedy series Nebulous.

In 2012, O'Mara appeared in a theatre adaptation of Agatha Christie's Death on the Nile.

== Personal life ==
O'Mara was married twice, first to Jeremy Young in 1971; the couple divorced in 1976. In 1993, she married Richard Willis, but the marriage was dissolved in 1996.

She had two sons, Dickon Young (1964–2012) and Christopher Linde (born 1965), both from previous relationships. Dickon took his stepfather's surname but Christopher, having been given up for adoption, was named by his adoptive parents, Derek and Joy Linde. Christopher, from whom O'Mara was long estranged, was the son of actor David Orchard. Dickon, whose biological father was reportedly actor Ian Cullen, was a stage manager for the Royal Shakespeare Company before setting up his own company building tree-houses in the mid-1990s. He was found hanged, a presumed suicide, at the family home in Long Marston, Warwickshire, on 31 December 2012, after previous suicide attempts. O'Mara was in hospital with pneumonia at the time of her son's death and his body was not discovered for three weeks.

O'Mara wrote four books, including two novels: When She Was Bad (1992) (ISBN 0261667157) and Good Time Girl (1993), (ISBN 0002242915)). She also wrote two autobiographical books, Vamp Until Ready (2003) (ISBN 1861057008) and Game Plan: A Woman's Survival Kit (1990) (ISBN 0283060573).

She acknowledged that she shared some blame for her marital troubles, noting that she was too independent and challenging of authority, despite liking the idea of a “knight in shining armor” to sweep her off her feet from time to time. She also said that she appreciated men with a sense of humour. “I prefer blond men ... But when it comes to physical attraction it’s very difficult to pinpoint ... I think the most important thing is a sense of humour: If a man can make me roar with laughter he'll definitely find himself on my welcome list. And if he's tall, blond, and has the bonus of a sense of humour, he'll be on my priority list. And by tall, I don't mean a giant. With my height, a bloke of 5ft.10ins is real tall!"

Speaking of her bouts of depression, later in her life O'Mara said: "I've since learnt a cure for depression: listening to J.S. Bach and reading P.G. Wodehouse. This got me through the break-up of my second marriage 17 years ago. The great thing about Wodehouse is that his books are full of romantic problems and yet so hilarious that it puts things in perspective ... I'm not frightened of dying, but I love the countryside so much and I'm going to miss it. I'd like to be out in the wind and the trees for ever."

== Death ==
O'Mara died on 30 March 2014 in a nursing home, in Worthing, Sussex, aged 74, from ovarian cancer. She left a £350,000 estate, bequeathing £10,000 to the Actors' Benevolent Fund and, after the funeral and legal fees, the remainder to her younger sister Belinda Carroll, a former actress.

== Filmography ==
=== Film ===
Year	Title	Role	Notes
1956	Home and Away	Annie Knowles	As Merrie Carroll
1962	Captain Clegg	Girl at Inn	Uncredited
1968	Corruption	Val Nolan	
1968	Great Catherine	Varinka	Gordon Flemyng film
1968	The Limbo Line	Irina Tovskia	
1969	The Desperados	Adah	Henry Levin film
1970	The Vampire Lovers	The Governess (Mme. Perrodot)	Roy Ward Baker film
1970	Cannon for Cordoba	Ruby	
1970	The Horror of Frankenstein	Alys	Jimmy Sangster film
1974	The Tamarind Seed	Anna Skriabina	Blake Edwards film
1974	Feelings	Barbara Martin	Gerry O'Hara film
1976	Machinegunner	Pat Livingston	
1978	An Unknown Friend	Karen Lindén	
1978	The Nativity	Salome	
1992	Aladdin	Madam Roly Poly	Voice
1992	Beauty and the Beast	Lucinda	Voice
1999	The Road to Ithaca	Despina	

=== Television ===
Year	Title	Role	Notes
1957-1967	Emergency Ward 10	Nurse	
1964– 1966	No Hiding Place	Jacqueline	2 episodes
1965	Danger Man	Annette	Episode: A Room in the Basement
1965	Gaslight Theatre	Patience	Episode: The Drunkard or, the Sins of the Parents Shall Be Visited...
1965	Hereward the Wake	Richilda	Episode: The Court of Love
1966	Court Martial	Episode: Logistics of Survival	
1966	Weavers Green	Mick Armstrong	
1967	Adam Adamant Lives!	Sonia Fawzi	Episode: The Basardi Affair
1967	Welcome to Japan, Mr. Bond	Miss Moneypenny's assistant	Uncredited
1967	The Troubleshooters	Kim Hart	Episode: Mr. Know-How
1967– 1968	The Saint	Annabelle / Nadine / Yvette	Episodes: Double Take, Counterfeit Countess, Fast Women
1967– 1969	Z-Cars	Kate / Mae Astell	4 episodes
1968	Promenade	Laura	Short film
1968	The Champions	Jane Purcell	Episode: To Catch a Rat
1969	The Avengers	Lisa	Episode: Stay Tuned
1969	The Main Chance	Julia Main	4 episodes
1969	Department S	Pietra	Episode: Who Plays the Dummy
1970	Never a Cross Word	Ellie	Episode: When is a Spy...
1970	Codename	Helen Lingard	Episode: Opening Gambit
1970	Paul Temple	Luciana Benedetti	Episode: Re-take
1970	The Adventures of Don Quick	Peleen	Episode: People isn't Everything
1972	A Man About a Dog	Storm Riordan	
1972	ITV Sunday Night Theatre	Storm Riordan	
1972	The Persuaders!	Heidi Schulman	Episode: Read and Destroy
1972	Jason King	Delphi	Episode: A Kiss for a Beautiful Killer
1972	Clouds of Witness	Cynthia Tarrant	Episode 1.3
1972	Pathfinders	Section Officer Anne Denby	Episode: Fog
1973	Spy Trap	Sharon Lunghi	3 episodes
1973	Men of Affairs	Tania Lenz	1 episode
1974	The Protectors	Sarah Trent	Episode: A Pocketful of Posies
1975– 1976	The Brothers	Jane Maxwell	30 episodes
1976	Morecambe & Wise	Kate O'Mata Hari	Christmas Special
1976	The Two Ronnies	The Gypsy Queen	
1977	The Two Ronnies	Lucy Lee	Series 6 Episodes 3–6: Stop! You're Killing Me mini-serial
1977-1978	Whodunnit?	Lady Gertrude Potter/Treasure Chest Magee	2 episodes
1978	Return of the Saint	Jeanette	Episode: Assault Force
1979	The Plank	'It's Paint' Woman	
1981– 1982	Triangle	Katherine Laker	27 episodes
1985– 1987	Doctor Who	The Rani	Serials: "The Mark of the Rani"/"Time and the Rani"
1986	Dempsey and Makepeace	Joyce Hargreaves	Episode: Guardian Angels
1986	Dynasty	Cassandra "Caress" Morell	Recurring (Seasons 6–7)
1987	Great Catherine	Varinka	
1989– 1990	Howards' Way	Laura Wilde	26 episodes
1990	Cluedo	Mrs. Peacock	Episode: Christmas Past, Christmas Present
1993	Comic Relief: The Invasion of the Comic Tomatoes	Female Patient	
1993	Doctor Who: Dimensions in Time	The Rani	Guest appearance
1995– 2003	Absolutely Fabulous	Jackie Stone	2 episodes
1997	The New Adventures of Robin Hood	Lady Isabelle	Episode: Marion to the Rescue
2001	Bad Girls	Virginia O'Kane	4 episodes
2003	Crossroads	Lady Alice Fox	Soap opera
2005	Family Affairs	Jackie Lawrence	Soap opera
2008	Doctors	Rosetta Froom	Episode: Fears, Feats & the Frooms
2012	Benidorm	Barbara Simmonds	1 episode (final appearance)

== Select stage roles ==
- 1963, Jessica, The Merchant of Venice at the Shaftesbury Theatre.
- 1966, Lydia Languish, The Rivals at The Welsh Theatre Co.
- 1967, Elsa, The Italian Girl at the Wyndham's Theatre
- 1970, Fleda Vetch, The Spoils of Poynton at the Mayfair Theatre
- 1971, Gerda Von Metz, The Avengers (directed by Leslie Phillips) at the Prince of Wales Theatre
- 1971–2, Sheila Wallis, Suddenly at Home at the Fortune Theatre
- 1974, Elvira, Blithe Spirit at the Bristol Old Vic
- 1974, Liza Moriarty, Sherlock's Last Case at the Open Space Theatre Fortune Theatre
- 1977, Sybil Merton, Lord Arthur Saville's Crime at the Sadlers Wells Theatre
- 1977, Louka, Arms and the Man at the Hong Kong Festival
- 1978, Rosaline, Love's Labour's Lost at the Thorndike Theatre
- 1978, Katherina, The Taming of the Shrew at the Ludlow Festival
- 1978, Cyrenne, Rattle of a Simple Man
- 1979, Monica Claverton-Ferry, The Elder Statesman
- 1979, Lina, Misalliance at The Birmingham Rep
- 1979, Irene St Clair, The Crucifer of Blood at the Haymarket Theatre
- 1980, Ruth, Night and Day, at post-London tour
- 1981, Stephanie Abrahams, Duet for One Yugoslavia and tour
- 1981, Beatrice, Much Ado About Nothing at the New Shakespeare Co
- 1982, Kathrina, The Taming of the Shrew at the Nottingham Playhouse\New Shakespeare Co
- 1982, Titania\Hippolta, A Midsummer Night's Dream at the New Shakespeare Co
- 1982, Lady Macbeth, Macbeth at the Mercury Theatre
- 1982, Cleopatra, Antony and Cleopatra at the Nottingham Playhouse
- 1982, Millamant, The Way of the World at the Nottingham Playhouse
- 1983, Hortense, The Rehearsal
- 1984, Mistress Ford, The Merry Wives of Windsor at the New Shakespeare Co
- 1985 – 1987, Frances Black, Light Up the Sky at the Old Vic & Globe Theatres
- 1987, Goneril, King Lear at the Compass Theatre
- 1988, Berinthia, The Relapse at the Mermaid Theatre
- 1990, Torfreida, The Last Englishman at The Orange Tree Theatre
- 1990, Martha, Who's Afraid of Virginia Woolf? at the Yvonne Arnaud Theatre
- 1991, Lilli Vanessi, Kiss Me Kate, RSC tour
- 1992, Lady Fanciful, The Provok'd Wife at the National Theatre Studio
- 1992, Rosabel, Venus Observed at the Chichester Festival
- 1992, Eve, Cain at the Chichester Festival
- 1992, Jackie, King Lear in New York at the Chichester Festival
- 1994, Maria Wislack, On Approval
- 1995, Pola, The Simpleton of the Unexpected Isles at The Orange Tree Theatre
- 1995, Rachel, My Cousin Rachel, English Theatre, Vienna and tour 1995
- 1996, Olivia, Twelfth Night at the Haymarket Theatre, Basingstoke
- 1996–7, Mrs Cheveley, An Ideal Husband at the Haymarket, Albery and Gielgud theatres
- 2000, Mrs. Malaprop\Lucy, The Rivals
- 2000, Madame Alexandre, Colombe at the Salisbury Playhouse
- 2003, Gertrude Lawrence, Noel and Gertie
- 2004, Mrs Arbuthnot, A Woman of No Importance
- 2005, Eloise, The Marquise at the Mercury Theatre
- 2005, Helen, We Happy Few at the Gielgud Theatre
- 2008, Marlene Dietrich, Lunch with Marlene at The New End Theatre
- 2010, Lady Windermere, Lord Arthur Saville's Crime at the Mercury Theatre

== See also ==
- Cinema of the United Kingdom
- Television in the United Kingdom

== Bibliography ==
- O'Mara, Kate (2003). Vamp Until Ready: A Life Laid Bare. Robson Books Ltd. ISBN 978-1861057006.
