= Max Harris (composer) =

English composer and arranger (1918–2004)

Max Harris (born Max Shengievsky; 15 September 1918 – 6 March 2004) was a British film and television composer and arranger. He played the piano and piano accordion.

== Biography and career ==
Harris was born in Bournemouth, Hampshire, England, into a Jewish family; his father was a tailor from Poland, and his mother had emigrated from Latvia. Harris was raised in London. He originally embarked on a career in dance bands and as a jazz musician, working as a pianist for the bands of Stan Atkins and Teddy Foster in the late 1930s, although in his late teens he was a trumpeter with Lew Foster.

During his war service, Harris became a captain in the Royal Army Service Corps. Post-war, Harris worked aboard the Mauretania on six cruises, and in groups led by clarinettist Carl Barriteau and drummer Jack Parnell. He was in the pit band for Parnell's Fancy Free review in 1951, and remained with Parnell after the show's short run working as an arranger and composer. He left in 1954 to join Cyril Stapleton BBC Show Band. An arranger for visiting American singers such as Ella Fitzgerald and Frank Sinatra, he wrote jingles for commercials in the later 1950s.

Harris' theme music for the Anthony Newley series The Strange World of Gurney Slade (1960) reached number 11 in the UK Singles Chart, and still resurfaces in fresh contexts. Harris also provided the theme music for the London Weekend Television (LWT) TV series The Gold Robbers (1969), the BBC 1 science-fiction series Doomwatch (1970–72), the LWT drama anthology series Big Brother (1970), the LWT police drama series New Scotland Yard (1972), the ITV comedy series Odd Man Out (1977) and the BBC serial A Horseman Riding By (1978).

Harris contributed the themes for several series featuring Ronnie Barker, such as Porridge and Open All Hours, and worked on the Dennis Potter serial The Singing Detective (1986), which included arranging and performing its accordion-based main theme. The Max Harris Group provided the music for the fourth series of Round the Horne (1968), and he wrote the theme tune in klezmer style for Radio 4's The Attractive Young Rabbi (1999–2002).

His film work included the scores to Baby Love (1969), the film version of On the Buses (1971), One of Our Dinosaurs is Missing (1975), and Carry On England (1976). He was also music director on several jazz albums issued during the 1970s which partnered violinists Stéphane Grappelli and Yehudi Menuhin.
