= Leonard White (producer) =

British actor and television producer (1916–2016)

- Born: 5 November 1916
- Died: 2 January 2016 (aged 99)
- Occupations: Actor, director and producer

Leonard White (5 November 1916 – 2 January 2016) was a British actor, director and television producer. In the latter role he was responsible for The Avengers and Armchair Theatre.

== Early life ==
White was born in Newhaven, East Sussex. His father was a bookmaker and racehorse owner, and his mother ran a wholesale newsagents business. He was introduced to acting by the headmaster of his school, who ran a boys' Shakespearean acting troupe.

== Career ==
After leaving school, White pursued a career as a stage actor in London. Initially, he supported himself with a clerical job while performing with the Tavistock Repertory Company (now the Tower Theatre Company). During World War II, he served in the British Army in Signals; following the end of World War II in Europe, he did the remainder of his service acting in plays produced by the Army Bureau of Current Affairs. On being demobilised in 1946, he made the transition to full-time professional acting. In 1951 he was one of the original leads of Christopher Fry's A Sleep of Prisoners, alongside Denholm Elliott, Stanley Baker, and Hugh Pryse.

From acting he turned his hand to directing, which led to his career as a television producer. In 1957, White directed several plays at Toronto's Crest Theatre, where Patrick Macnee had acted: Hobson's Choice, See How They Run, Janus and Bright Sun at Midnight.

In 1957, he completed a training course for television producer/directors run by the Canadian CBC Television. In 1960, Sydney Newman, a former CBC producer who had moved to Britain to work for the ITV contractor ABC Weekend TV, invited him to join the company as an associate producer. White's credits include Police Surgeon and The Avengers, which he co-created with Newman, as well as many episodes of the anthology series Out of This World, Armchair Theatre and ITV Playhouse. A few years before he died he narrated summaries of lost episodes of Series 1 of The Avengers to accompany reconstructions based on tele-snaps and production stills.

== Memoirs ==
He published a memoir, Armchair Theatre: The Lost Years, in 2003, and the first volume of his autobiography, Many Moons and a Few Stars, in 2010.

== Death ==
White died in the Abundant Grace nursing home in Seaford, East Sussex on 2 January 2016. He was survived by a niece and five grandchildren, and one great-grandson.
