= TV Hell =

1992 BBC television special

TV Hell was a BBC2 theme night broadcast on 31 August 1992, showing a whole evening of archive television clips widely regarded by critics and the public alike as among the worst ever produced in Britain. It followed an unrelated series of archive theme nights called "TV Heaven", shown on Channel 4 earlier that same year.

TV Hell was defined as programmes and broadcasts where the conception of the production was misguided, even though it made use of established television cast and crew. Many of the resulting catastrophes caused promising careers to be curtailed, or in some cases led to a review of the commissioning process.

The term "TV Hell" has since been adopted in media culture to describe television programmes which are not very good.

== Broadcast form ==
The clips were linked by Angus Deayton, playing the part of the Devil, and Paul Merton, playing a shellsuited couch potato who had been condemned to experience the worst of British Television for all eternity following his death, caused by a television falling onto his head from an upstairs window in the programme's opening sketch.

The comic sequences with Deayton and Merton were used to link several short documentaries, comprising, for example, Disastermind (a review of the worst performances on Mastermind), an A-Z of TV Hell moments, Storm in an Egg-Cup – a look back at the downfall of TV-am – and a short documentary about the production of the television soap Triangle, with interviews with cast and crew, followed by a repeat of the first episode. There were also humorous contributions from Victor Lewis-Smith. The evening also included a 60-minute documentary in the history of the Eurovision Song Contest narrated by Patrick Allen and featuring archive clips from the contest and interviews with (amongst others): Johnny Logan, Michael Ball and Katie Boyle.

== Examples of programmes ==
Examples of the programmes included in TV Hell:

- The first episode of Triangle, a short lived and critically panned BBC soap opera set aboard a fictional North Sea ferry.
- Churchill's People, a 26-part dramatised history of Britain screened on BBC 1 in primetime during 1974–75. The series was such a ratings disaster that the BBC changed its entire drama commissioning policy.
- Christopher Mayhew taking mescaline hydrochloride on an unbroadcast 1955 edition of Panorama, the first time an excerpt from this show had been screened.
- Club X – a disastrous attempt at an arts programme by Channel 4. Notably, the series happened to be the debut of TV Hell contributor Victor Lewis-Smith
- David Dimbleby filling live airtime on Panorama when all available telecine and video tape machines were out of commission.
- The various appearances by a drunk Oliver Reed on live television
- Several embarrassing moments taken from the Top of the Pops archive, linked by John Peel
- Danny Baker presenting a selection of clips from chat shows where interviews had not gone to plan. Baker made his debut as a chatshow host the following year.
- Minipops

An edited version of the BBC pilot for Mainly for Men, a late night men's lifestyle magazine programme made in 1969, was also shown. Although this was never screened when first made, and never progressed to a series, some television critics have subsequently and erroneously assumed that it was broadcast in the 1960s.

== See also ==
- List of television series considered the worst
