= Police Surgeon (British TV series) =

1960 British TV medical drama series

- Created by: Sydney Newman
- Starring: Ian Hendry; John Warwick; Ingrid Hafner
- Country of origin: United Kingdom
- No. of episodes: 13 (12 missing)

Production
- Producers: Julian Bond; Leonard White
- Running time: 30 minutes
- Production company: ABC Weekend TV

Original release
- Network: ITV
- Release: 10 September – 3 December 1960

Police Surgeon is a television series made by ABC Weekend TV and starring Ian Hendry as Dr Geoffrey Brent. Its thirteen half-hour episodes were broadcast on ITV at 7 pm on Saturday nights from 10 September to 3 December 1960. It is seen as a precursor to The Avengers, although there is no narrative connection.

== Episodes ==
1. Easy Money
2. Under the Influence...?
3. Lag on the Run
4. Smash But No Grab
5. Wilful Neglect
6. Diplomatic Immunity
7. A Home of Her Own
8. You Won't Feel a Thing
9. Sunday Morning Story
10. Three's a Crowd
11. Man Overboard
12. Operation Mangle
13. The Bigger They Are

== Production ==
The series was created for ABC by Sydney Newman. Most episodes were made at ABC's Didsbury Studios in Manchester, but a few were made at the newly refurbished Teddington Studios in London. The series was first broadcast in September 1960 and starred Ian Hendry as a police surgeon who worked for the Metropolitan Police. The series was originally produced by Julian Bond, who was effectively co-creator of the series having had the idea from meeting a GP in the Notting Hill area of London whilst working on another television series. This doctor also worked as a police surgeon and Bond was interested in writing a series of "low key" dramas which would be distinct from the BBC's "police drama" output at that time in the shape of series like Dixon of Dock Green, and would deal with "social misfits". Sydney Newman had reservations about this concept but supported the creation of the series and Bond cast Ian Hendry in the lead role. Julian Bond felt uncomfortable as a TV producer, being more interested in the creative side and felt that he was not a robust manager. Leonard White took over as producer on the direction of Sydney Newman. A generous commercial deal had been struck with the police surgeon who was the inspiration for the series and had financial and creative rights in the series, aside from the script writing and just before the first episode was to be transmitted legal action was threatened by this individual, unless he could write the scripts and ABC television's legal department became involved. The series ran for merely 13 episodes and was then cancelled by Sydney Newman. It is possible that the reason for this was the legal and financial disputes surrounding the original concept, as The Avengers appears to have been devised as a hasty replacement that could also serve as a vehicle for its star, Ian Hendry.

When Police Surgeon was cancelled, Newman took both Hendry and co-star Ingrid Hafner to this series, and this may be why it is sometimes mistakenly claimed that The Avengers was a direct sequel to Police Surgeon, with Hendry playing the same character in both. Although there were similarities, this was in fact not the case. This myth has possibly been encouraged because material relating to Police Surgeon is scarce, and that the first episode of The Avengers aired only one month after the final episode of Police Surgeon.

== Cast and crew ==
John Warwick played the regular character of Inspector Langdon, and Hafner played Nurse Gibbs. Guest actors who appeared in Police Surgeon include Michael Crawford, Bernard Archard, Harry H. Corbett, Geoffrey Palmer, and Nigel Stock.

Scriptwriters included Julian Bond, who was also story editor and, initially, producer. He was succeeded as producer by Leonard White, who went on to produce The Avengers.

== Archival status and availability ==
Only one episode of the series, "Easy Money", featuring Crawford, is known to exist. This episode was shown as part of Channel 4's TV Heaven season, introduced by Frank Muir, on 28 March 1992 and is included on the season 2 box-set of The Avengers as an extra.
